= Shooting at the 2024 Summer Paralympics – Qualification =

Qualification for shooting at the 2024 Summer Paralympics begins from June 7, 2022. There will be three events for male and female sports shooters and seven mixed events. There will be a total of 160 athlete quotas (45 male, 60 female, 55 gender free).

== Timeline ==
Detailed direct allocation slots are listed in the qualification slots section.

| Events | Date | Venue | R1 | R2 | R3 | | | R4 | | | R5 | | | R6 | | | R7 | R8 | R9 | | | P1 | P2 | P3 | | | P4 | | | Total Male | Total Female | Total Gender Free | Berths |
| Events | Date | Venue | M | F | M | F | GF | M | F | GF | M | F | GF | M | F | GF | M | F | M | F | GF | M | F | M | F | GF | M | F | GF | Total Male | Total Female | Total Gender Free | Berths |
|---|---|---|---|---|---|---|---|---|---|---|---|---|---|---|---|---|---|---|---|---|---|---|---|---|---|---|---|---|---|---|---|---|---|
| 2022 World Cup | 4–13 June 2022 | (France) Châteauroux | 2 | 2 | 0 | 0 | 1 | 0 | 0 | 1 | 0 | 1 | 1 | 0 | 1 | 1 | 1 | 1 | 0 | 1 | 1 | 1 | 1 | 0 | 0 | 1 | 0 | 0 | 1 | 4 | 7 | 7 | 18 |
| 2022 World Championships | 3–18 November 2022 | (United Arab Emirates) Al-Ain | 2 | 2 | 0 | 0 | 1 | 0 | 1 | 1 | 0 | 1 | 2 | 0 | 1 | 2 | 2 | 2 | 1 | 1 | 2 | 2 | 2 | 0 | 1 | 2 | 2 | 2 | 1 | 8 | 13 | 10 | 31 |
| 2023 World Cup | 22–31 May 2023 | (South Korea) Changwon | 1 | 1 | 0 | 0 | 1 | 1 | 1 | 0 | 1 | 1 | 0 | 1 | 1 | 0 | 2 | 2 | 1 | 1 | 0 | 1 | 1 | 0 | 0 | 1 | 0 | 0 | 1 | 8 | 8 | 3 | 19 |
| 2023 European Para Championships | 15–21 August 2023 | (Netherlands) Rotterdam | 1 | 1 | 0 | 0 | 0 | 1 | 1 | 0 | 0 | 0 | 0 | 0 | 0 | 0 | 0 | 0 | 0 | 0 | 0 | 1 | 1 | 0 | 0 | 0 | 0 | 0 | 0 | 3 | 3 | 0 | 6 |
| 2023 World Championships | 19–29 September 2023 | (Peru) Lima | 2 | 2 | 0 | 1 | 1 | 0 | 1 | 2 | 0 | 1 | 2 | 0 | 1 | 2 | 2 | 2 | 0 | 0 | 2 | 2 | 2 | 1 | 2 | 2 | 1 | 1 | 1 | 8 | 13 | 12 | 33 |
| 2022 Asian Para Games | 22–28 October 2023 | (China) Hangzhou | 1 | 1 | 0 | 0 | 1 | 0 | 0 | 1 | 0 | 0 | 1 | 0 | 0 | 1 | 0 | 0 | 0 | 0 | 1 | 1 | 1 | 0 | 0 | 0 | 0 | 0 | 1 | 2 | 2 | 4 | 8 |
| 2023 Parapan American Games | 17–25 November 2023 | (Chile) Santiago | 0 | 0 | 0 | 0 | 1 | 0 | 0 | 1 | 0 | 0 | 0 | 0 | 0 | 0 | 0 | 0 | 0 | 0 | 0 | 1 | 1 | 0 | 0 | 0 | 0 | 0 | 0 | 1 | 1 | 2 | 4 |
| 2024 World Cup | 6–15 March 2024 | (India) New Delhi | 1 | 1 | 1 | 1 | 1 | 0 | 1 | 2 | 1 | 0 | 1 | 0 | 1 | 1 | 1 | 1 | 0 | 1 | 1 | 1 | 1 | 0 | 0 | 1 | 0 | 0 | 1 | 5 | 7 | 8 | 20 |
| 2024 European Championships | 30 May–7 June 2024 | (Spain) Granada | 1 | 1 | 0 | 1 | 1 | 1 | 1 | 0 | 0 | 0 | 1 | 0 | 0 | 1 | 1 | 1 | 0 | 0 | 1 | 1 | 1 | 1 | 0 | 1 | 0 | 0 | 1 | 5 | 5 | 6 | 16 |
| Bipartite commission slots | n/a | | | | | | | | | | | | | | | | | | | | | | | | | | | | | 3 | 3 | 1 | 7 |
| Host country slots | n/a | | | | | | | | | | | | | | | | | | | | | | | | | | | | | 1 | 1 | 0 | 2 |
| | | | | | 1 | 3 | 8 | 2 | 5 | 7 | 2 | 4 | 8 | 1 | 5 | 8 | | | 1 | 4 | 6 | | | 2 | 3 | 8 | 3 | 3 | 7 | | | | |
| Per event totals | | | 10 | 10 | 12 | | | 14 | | | 14 | | | 14 | | | 9 | 9 | 11 | | | 10 | 10 | 13 | | | 13 | | | 45 | 60 | 55 | 160 |

== Qualification requirements ==
=== Eligibility scores ===
Each athlete from each NPC must at least aim to score targets in each medalling event in the qualifying tournaments.

| Event | | Score |
|---|---|---|
| Rifle | R1 – Men's 10 m air rifle standing SH1 | 600.0 |
| Rifle | R2 – Women's 10 m air rifle standing SH1 | 595.0 |
| Rifle | R3 – Mixed 10 m air rifle prone SH1 | 625.0 |
| Rifle | R4 – Mixed 10 m air rifle standing SH2 | 620.0 |
| Rifle | R5 – Mixed 10 m air rifle prone SH2 | 628.0 |
| Rifle | R6 – Mixed 50 m rifle prone SH1 | 610.0 |
| Rifle | R7 – Men's 50 m rifle 3 positions SH1 | 1110 |
| Rifle | R8 – Women's 50 m rifle 3 positions SH1 | 1050 |
| Rifle | R9 – Mixed 50 m rifle prone SH2 | 610.0 |
| Pistol | P1 – Men's 10 m air pistol SH1 | 547 |
| Pistol | P2 – Women's 10 m air pistol SH1 | 510 |
| Pistol | P3 – Mixed 25 m sport pistol SH1 | 540 |
| Pistol | P4 – Mixed 50 m pistol SH1 | 510 |

== Summary ==
| Nation | Men | | | Women | | | Mixed | | | | | | | Quotas | Athletes |
| Nation | R1 | R7 | P1 | R2 | R8 | P2 | R3 | R4 | R5 | R6 | R9 | P3 | P4 | Quotas | Athletes |
|---|---|---|---|---|---|---|---|---|---|---|---|---|---|---|---|
| Argentina (ARG) | | | | | | | | | 1 | | | | | 1 | 1 |
| Australia (AUS) | | | | | 1 | | | | | | | | | 1 | 1 |
| Azerbaijan (AZE) | | | | | | | | | | | | | 1 | 1 | 1 |
| Brazil (BRA) | | | | | | | | 1 | | | | | | 1 | 1 |
| China (CHN) | 1 | 2 | 1 | 1 | 2 | | | | | | | 1 | 1 | 9 | 9 |
| Colombia (COL) | | | | | | | 1 | | | | | | | 1 | 1 |
| Costa Rica (CRC) | | | | | | 1 | | | | | | | | 1 | 1 |
| Cuba (CUB) | | | 1 | | | | | | | | | 1 | 1 | 3 | 3 |
| Czech Republic (CZE) | | | | | | | | | | | | 1 | | 1 | 1 |
| Denmark (DEN) | 1 | 1 | | | | | | | | 1 | | | 1 | 4 | 4 |
| Finland | | | | | | | | | | 1 | | | | 1 | 1 |
| France (FRA) | 2 | | | | | 1 | | 2 | 1 | 1 | 1 | 1 | | 9 | 9 |
| Germany (GER) | | | | | | | | 2 | | 1 | 1 | | | 4 | 4 |
| Georgia | | | | | | | | | | | 1 | | | 1 | 1 |
| Great Britain (GBR) | | | | | | | | | | 1 | 2 | 1 | | 4 | 4 |
| Greece (GRE) | | 1 | | | | | | | | | | | | 1 | 1 |
| Hungary (HUN) | 1 | | | | | | | | | | | 1 | | 2 | 2 |
| India (IND) | | | 2 | 2 | | | | 1 | | 1 | | 2 | 1 | 9 | 9 |
| Indonesia (INA) | | | | 1 | | | | | 1 | | | | | 2 | 2 |
| Iran (IRI) | | | | 1 | | 2 | | | | | 1 | | 2 | 6 | 6 |
| Israel (ISR) | | | | | | | 1 | | | | | | | 1 | 1 |
| Italy (ITA) | | | 1 | | | | | 1 | 2 | | 2 | | | 6 | 6 |
| Japan (JPN) | | | | | | | 1 | | 2 | | | | | 3 | 3 |
| Kazakhstan (KAZ) | 1 | | | | | | | | | | | | | 1 | 1 |
| Lithuania (LTU) | | | | | | 1 | | | | | | | | 1 | 1 |
| Neutral Paralympic Athletes (NPA) | | | | | | 1 | 1 | | | | | | | 2 | 2 |
| New Zealand (NZL) | | | | | | | 1 | 1 | | | | | | 2 | 2 |
| North Macedonia (MKD) | | | | | | | | | | | | | 1 | 1 | 1 |
| Norway (NOR) | | | | | | | | 1 | | | | | | 1 | 1 |
| Peru (PER) | | | | | | | 1 | | | | | | | 1 | 1 |
| Poland (POL) | | 1 | | 1 | | | 1 | | | | | 1 | | 4 | 4 |
| Portugal | | | | | | | | | 1 | | | | | 1 | 1 |
| Serbia (SRB) | | 1 | | | 1 | | | 1 | 1 | | | | 1 | 5 | 5 |
| Singapore (SGP) | | | 1 | | | | | | | | | | | 1 | 1 |
| Slovakia (SVK) | | 1 | | | 1 | | | | | | | | | 2 | 2 |
| Slovenia (SLO) | | | | | | | | 1 | | | | | | 1 | 1 |
| South Korea (KOR) | 2 | | 1 | 1 | 1 | 1 | | 2 | 1 | | 1 | 1 | 1 | 12 | 12 |
| Spain (ESP) | | | | | | | 1 | | | | | | | 1 | 1 |
| Sweden (SWE) | | | | 1 | | | | | | | | | | 1 | 1 |
| Switzerland (SUI) | | | | | | | | | 1 | | | | | 1 | 1 |
| Thailand (THA) | | 1 | | | 2 | | | | | 1 | 1 | | 1 | 6 | 6 |
| Turkey (TUR) | | | | 1 | | 2 | 1 | | 1 | | | | 1 | 6 | 7 |
| Ukraine (UKR) | 1 | | | 1 | | 1 | | | 1 | | 1 | 1 | | 6 | 6 |
| United Arab Emirates (UAE) | 1 | 1 | | | | | | 2 | | 1 | | | | 5 | 5 |
| United States (USA) | | | 1 | | | | | 1 | 1 | 2 | | 1 | | 6 | 6 |
| Uzbekistan (UZB) | | | 1 | | | 1 | | | | | | | | 2 | 2 |
| 46 NPCs | 10 | 8 | 10 | 10 | 7 | 10 | 10 | 13 | 13 | 9 | 10 | 11 | 12 | 133 | 133 |

== Qualification slots ==
- An NPC may enter a maximum of two (2) eligible athletes per medal event.
- An athlete may only obtain one (1) qualification slot for his/her NPC. An NPC may obtain a maximum of two (2) qualification slots per medal event across all Qualification Competitions. The maximum number of events that an athlete may compete in is three (3).
- An NPC can be allocated a maximum total of twelve (12) qualification slots, with a maximum of eight (8) slots for male athletes or eight (8) slots for female athletes.
- Qualification slots are allocated to the NPCs, not to the individual athlete however in Bipartite Commission Invitation, the slot is allocated to the individual athlete not to the NPC.

=== Pistol ===
==== P1 – Men's 10 m Air Pistol SH1 ====
| Events | Berths | Nation | Qualified athlete | Selected Athlete |
|---|---|---|---|---|
| 2022 World Cup | 1 | Uzbekistan | Server Ibragimov | |
| 2022 World Championships | 2 | South Korea | Jo Jeong-du | |
| 2022 World Championships | 2 | India | Singhraj Adhana | Rudransh Khandelwal |
| 2023 World Cup | 1 | China | Lou Xiaolong | |
| 2023 European Championships | 1 | Italy | Davide Franceschetti | |
| 2023 World Championships | 2 | India | Manish Narwal | Manish Narwal |
| 2023 World Championships | 2 | Germany | Tobias Meyer | |
| 2022 Asian Para Games | 1 | Singapore | Daniel Chan | |
| 2023 Parapan American Games | 1 | United States | Marco De La Rosa | |
| 2024 World Cup | 1 | Cuba | Alexander Jerez | |
| Bipartite commission slots | | | | |
| Host country slots | | | | |

==== P2 – Women's 10 m Air Pistol SH1 ====
| Events | Berths | Nation | Qualified athlete | Selected Athlete |
|---|---|---|---|---|
| 2022 World Cup | 1 | Turkey | Aysel Özgan | |
| 2022 World Championships | 2 | South Korea | Moon Aee-kyung | |
| 2022 World Championships | 2 | Iran | Nasrin Shahi | |
| 2023 World Cup | 1 | France | Gaelle Edon | |
| 2023 European Championships | 1 | Lithuania | Raimeda Bučinskytė | |
| 2023 World Championships | 2 | Ukraine | Iryna Liakhu | |
| 2023 World Championships | 2 | Uzbekistan | Shakhnoza Mamajonova | |
| 2022 Asian Para Games | 1 | Iran | Sareh Javanmardi | |
| 2023 Parapan American Games | 1 | Costa Rica | Paola Arana Loria | |
| 2024 World Cup | 1 | Neutral Paralympic Athletes | Oksana Berezovskaia | |
| Bipartite commission slots | | | | |
| Host country slots | | | | |

==== P3 – Mixed 25 m Pistol SH1 ====
| Events | Berths | Nation | Qualified athlete | Selected Athlete |
|---|---|---|---|---|
| 2022 World Cup | 1 (Gender free) | Poland | Szymon Sowiński | |
| 2022 World Championships | 1 (Female) | Hungary | Krisztina Dávid | |
| 2022 World Championships | 2 (Gender free) | South Korea | Kim Jung-nam | |
| 2022 World Championships | 2 (Gender free) | Ukraine | Oleksii Denysiuk | |
| 2023 World Cup | 1 (Gender free) | China | Huang Xing | |
| 2023 World Championships | 1 (Male) | United States | Gong Yan Xiao | |
| 2023 World Championships | 2 (Female) | Cuba | Yenigladys Suarez Echevarria | |
| 2023 World Championships | 2 (Female) | Great Britain | Issy Bailey | |
| 2023 World Championships | 2 (Gender free) | India | Nihal Singh | |
| 2023 World Championships | 2 (Gender free) | India | Amir Ahmad Bhat | |
| 2024 European Championships | 1 (Male) | Czech Republic | Tomas Pesek | |
| 2024 European Championships | 1 (Gender free) | Turkey | Muharrem Korhan Yamac | |
| 2024 World Cup | 1 (Gender free) | France | Romain Ramalingom | |
| Bipartite commission slots | | | | |
| Host country slots | | | | |

==== P4 – Mixed 50 m Pistol SH1 ====
| Events | Berths | Nation | Qualified athlete | Selected Athlete |
|---|---|---|---|---|
| 2022 World Cup | 1 (Gender free) | China | Yang Chao | |
| 2022 World Championships | 2 (Male) | Turkey | Cevat Karagöl | |
| 2022 World Championships | 2 (Male) | Iran | Mohammadreza Mirshafiei | |
| 2022 World Championships | 1 (Female)^{[a]} | North Macedonia | Olivera Nakovska-Bikova | |
| 2022 World Championships | 1 (Gender free) | Serbia | Živko Papaz | |
| 2023 World Cup | 1 (Gender free) | South Korea | Park Sea-kyun | |
| 2023 World Championships | 1 (Male) | Azerbaijan | Kamran Zeynalov | |
| 2023 World Championships | 1 (Female) | Thailand | Somporn Muangsiri | |
| 2023 World Championships | 1 (Gender free) | India | Rudransh Khandelwal | |
| 2022 Asian Para Games | 1 (Gender free) | Iran | Faezeh Ahmadi | |
| 2024 European Championships | 1 (Gender free) | Denmark | Buster Mathias Antonsen | |
| 2024 World Cup | 1 (Gender free) | Cuba | Di Ángelo Rodríguez | |
| Bipartite commission slots | | | | |
| Host country slots | | | | |

=== Rifle ===
==== R1 – Men's 10 m Air Rifle Standing SH1 ====
| Events | Berths | Nation | Qualified athlete | Selected Athlete |
|---|---|---|---|---|
| 2022 World Cup | 2 | France | Jean-Louis Michaud | |
| 2022 World Cup | 2 | Hungary | Csaba Rescsik | |
| 2022 World Championships | 2 | France | Didier Richard | |
| 2022 World Championships | 2 | South Korea | Lee Jang-ho | |
| 2023 World Cup | 1 | South Korea | Park Jin-ho | |
| 2023 European Championships | 1 | Ukraine | Andrii Doroshenko | |
| 2023 World Championships | 2 | China | Ren Bo | |
| 2023 World Championships | 2 | Denmark | Jan Winther | |
| 2022 Asian Para Games | 1 | United Arab Emirates | Obaid Al-Dahmani | |
| 2024 World Cup | 1 | Kazakhstan | Yerkin Gabbasov | |
| Bipartite commission slots | | | | |
| Host country slots | | | | |

==== R2 – Women's 10 m Air Rifle Standing SH1 ====
| Events | Berths | Nation | Qualified athlete | Selected Athlete |
|---|---|---|---|---|
| 2022 World Cup | 2 | India | Avani Lekhara | Avani Lekhara |
| 2022 World Cup | 2 | Poland | Emilia Babska | |
| 2022 World Championships | 2 | Ukraine | Iryna Shchetnik | |
| 2022 World Championships | 2 | South Korea | Lee Yun-ri | |
| 2023 World Cup | 1 | Sweden | Anna Benson | |
| 2023 European Championships | 1 | Turkey | Çağla Baş | |
| 2023 World Championships | 2 | China | Zhong Yixin | |
| 2023 World Championships | 2 | Indonesia | Hanik Puji Hastuti | Hanik Puji Hastuti |
| 2022 Asian Para Games | 1 | Iran | Roghayeh Shojaei | |
| 2024 World Cup | 1 | India | Mona Agarwal | Mona Agarwal |
| Bipartite commission slots | | | | |
| Host country slots | | | | |

==== R3 – Mixed 10 m Air Rifle Prone SH1 ====
| Events | Berths | Nation | Qualified athlete | Selected Athlete |
|---|---|---|---|---|
| 2022 World Cup | 1 (Gender free) | Israel | Yuliya Chernoy | |
| 2022 World Championships | 1 (Gender free) | Germany | Natascha Hiltrop | |
| 2023 World Cup | 1 (Gender free) | Spain | Juan Antonio Saaverda Reinaldo | |
| 2023 World Championships | 1 (Female) | Poland | Emilia Trześniowska | |
| 2023 World Championships | 1 (Gender free) | Turkey | Erhan Coşkuner | |
| 2022 Asian Para Games | 1 (Gender free) | Japan | Kazuya Okada | |
| 2023 Parapan American Games | 1 (Gender free) | Colombia | María Restrepo | |
| 2024 European Championships | 1 (Female) | Norway | Amanda Dybendal | |
| 2024 European Championships | 1 (Gender free) | Germany | Tjark Liestmann | |
| 2024 World Cup | 1 (Male) | New Zealand | Gregory Reid | |
| 2024 World Cup | 1 (Female) | Neutral Paralympic Athletes | Tatiana Ryabchenko | |
| 2024 World Cup | 1 (Gender free) | Peru | Jorge Arcela | |
| Bipartite commission slots | | | | |
| Host country slots | | | | |

==== R4 – Mixed 10 m Air Rifle Standing SH2 ====
| Events | Berths | Nation | Qualified athlete | Selected Athlete |
|---|---|---|---|---|
| 2022 World Cup | 1 (Gender free) | India | Sriharsha Ramakrishna Davareddi | |
| 2022 World Championships | 1 (Female) | Italy (2024 Summer) | Livia Cecagallina | |
| 2022 World Championships | 1 (Gender free) | France | Tanguy de la Forest | |
| 2023 World Cup | 1 (Male) | South Korea | Seo Hun-tae | |
| 2023 World Cup | 1 (Female) | United Arab Emirates | Ayesha Alshamsi | |
| 2023 European Championships | 1 (Male) | Slovenia | Franček Gorazd Tiršek | |
| 2023 European Championships | 0 (Female) | —N/a | | |
| 2023 World Championships | 1 (Female) | United Arab Emirates | Ayesha Al-Mehairi | |
| 2023 World Championships | 2 (Gender free) | South Korea | Lee Myung-ho | |
| 2023 World Championships | 2 (Gender free) | Serbia | Dejan Jokić | |
| 2023 Parapan American Games | 1 (Gender free) | Brazil | Alexandre Galgani | |
| 2024 World Cup | 1 (Female) | United States | Madison Champion | |
| 2024 World Cup | 2 (Gender free) | New Zealand | Michael Johnson | |
| 2024 World Cup | 2 (Gender free) | France | Kevin Liot | |
| Bipartite commission slots | | | | |
| Host country slots | | | | |

==== R5 – Mixed 10 m Air Rifle Prone SH2 ====
| Events | Berths | Nation | Qualified athlete | Selected Athlete |
|---|---|---|---|---|
| 2022 World Cup | 1 (Female) | Switzerland | Nicole Häusler | |
| 2022 World Cup | 1 (Gender free) | Serbia | Dragan Ristic | |
| 2022 World Championships | 1 (Female) | United States | Jazmin Almlie | |
| 2022 World Championships | 2 (Gender free) | Ukraine | Vasyl Kovalchuk | |
| 2022 World Championships | 2 (Gender free) | Indonesia | Bolo Triyanto | Bolo Triyanto |
| 2023 World Cup | 1 (Male) | South Korea | Kim Dong-il | |
| 2023 World Cup | 1 (Female) | Japan | Akiko Sega | |
| 2023 World Championships | 1 (Female) | Argentina | María Laura Rodríguez Belvedere | |
| 2023 World Championships | 2 (Gender free) | France | Pierre Guillaume-Sage | |
| 2023 World Championships | 2 (Gender free) | Italy (ITA) | Gianluca Iacus | |
| 2022 Asian Para Games | 1 (Gender free) | Japan | Mika Mizuta | |
| 2024 European Championships | 1 (Female) | Portugal | Margarida Lapa | |
| 2024 World Cup | 1 (Male) | Turkey | Hakan Çevik | |
| 2024 World Cup | 1 (Gender free) | Italy | Roberto Lazzaro | |
| Bipartite commission slots | | | | |
| Host country slots | | | | |

==== R6 – Mixed 50 m Rifle Prone SH1 ====
| Events | Berths | Nation | Qualified athlete | Selected Athlete |
|---|---|---|---|---|
| 2022 World Cup | 0 (Female)^{[b]} | —N/a | | |
| 2022 World Cup | 1 (Gender free) | France | Cédric Fèvre-Chevalier | |
| 2022 World Championships | 0 (Female)^{[b]} | —N/a | | |
| 2022 World Championships | 2 (Gender free) | Denmark | Kasper Hjort Lousdal | |
| 2022 World Championships | 2 (Gender free) | Great Britain | Matt Skelhon | |
| 2023 World Cup | 1 (Male) | United Arab Emirates | Saif Al-Nuaimi | |
| 2023 World Cup | 1 (Female) | Thailand | Chutima Arunmat | |
| 2023 World Championships | 0 (Female) | —N/a | | |
| 2023 World Championships | 2 (Gender free) | Germany | Cliff Junker | |
| 2023 World Championships | 2 (Gender free) | United States | John Joss III | |
| 2022 Asian Para Games | 1 (Gender free) | India | Sidhartha Babu | |
| 2024 European Championships | 1 (Gender free) | Finland | Jarkko Ilmari Mylly | |
| 2024 World Cup | 0 (Female) | —N/a | | |
| 2024 World Cup | 1 (Gender free) | United States | Kevin Nguyen | |
| Bipartite commission slots | | | | |
| Host country slots | | | | |

==== R7 – Men's 50 m Rifle 3 Positions ====
| Events | Berths | Nation | Qualified athlete | Selected Athlete |
|---|---|---|---|---|
| 2022 World Cup | 1 | China (CHN) | Dong Chao | |
| 2022 World Championships | 2 | United Arab Emirates | Abdulla Sultan Alaryani | |
| 2022 World Championships | 2 | Slovakia | Radoslav Malenovský | |
| 2023 World Cup | 2 | Thailand | Atidet Intanon | |
| 2023 World Cup | 2 | China | Xu Jianjie | |
| 2023 World Championships | 2 | Serbia | Laslo Šuranji | |
| 2023 World Championships | 2 | Poland | Marek Dobrowolski | |
| 2024 European Championships | 1 | Denmark | Jens Frimann | |
| 2024 World Cup | 1 | Greece | Sotirios Galogavros | |
| Bipartite commission slots | | | | |
| Host country slots | | | | |

==== R8 – Women's 50 m Rifle 3 Positions ====
| Events | Berths | Nation | Qualified athlete | Selected Athlete |
|---|---|---|---|---|
| 2022 World Cup | 1 | Slovakia | Veronika Vadovičová | |
| 2022 World Championships | 2 | South Korea | Lee Yoo-jeong | |
| 2022 World Championships | 2 | Thailand | Wannipa Leungvilai | |
| 2023 World Cup | 2 | China | Zhang Cuiping | |
| 2023 World Cup | 2 | China | Xie Huanyu | |
| 2023 World Championships | 1 | Thailand | Chutima Saenlar | |
| 2024 European Championships | 1 | Serbia | Jelena Pantovic | |
| 2024 World Cup | 1 | Australia | Natalie Smith | |
| Bipartite commission slots | | | | |
| Host country slots | | | | |

==== R9 – Mixed 50 m Rifle Prone SH2 ====
| Events | Berths | Nation | Qualified athlete | Selected Athlete |
|---|---|---|---|---|
| 2022 World Cup | 1 (Female) | France | Justine Beve | |
| 2022 World Cup | 1 (Gender free) | Thailand | Anuson Chaichamnan | |
| 2022 World Championships | 1 (Female) | Iran | Zahra Gholamzadeh | |
| 2022 World Championships | 1 (Gender free) | Ukraine | Vitalii Plakushchyi | |
| 2023 World Cup | 1 (Male) | Italy | Andrea Liverani | |
| 2023 World Cup | 1 (Female) | Italy | Pamela Novaglio | |
| 2023 World Championships | 2 (Gender free) | Germany | Moritz Moebius | |
| 2023 World Championships | 2 (Gender free) | Great Britain | Tim Jeffreys | |
| 2024 European Championships | 1 (Gender free) | Georgia | Vladimer Tchintcharauli | |
| 2024 World Cup | 1 (Female) | South Korea | Kim Youn-mi | |
| 2024 World Cup | 1 (Gender free) | Great Britain | Ryan Cockbill | |
| Bipartite commission slots | | | | |
| Host country slots | | | | |

== Notes ==
- ^{a} There is only one female athlete who has qualified
- ^{b} No female athlete who has qualified
