= 2025 World Shooting Para Sport World Cup =

2025 WSPS World Cup
- Sport: Para-Shooting
- Hosts: (South Korea) Changwon (United Arab Emirates) Al Ain
- Duration: 28 May – 5 November

Seasons
- ← 2024 2026 →

The 2025 WSPS World Cup is the annual edition of the World Shooting Para Sport World Cup in the Paralympic shooting events, governed by the International Paralympic Committee.

== Calendar ==
The calendar for the 2025 WSPS World Cup is as follows:

Leg	Dates	Location	Type	Ref.
1	28 May–6 June	(South Korea) Changwon	Rifle/Pistol/Shotgun	
2	25 October–5 November	(United Arab Emirates) Al Ain	Rifle/Pistol/Shotgun/VI	

== Medal table ==
Rank	Nation	Gold	Silver	Bronze	Total
1	India (IND)	15	13	4	32
2	South Korea (KOR)	13	9	9	31
3	Iran (IRI)	2	3	1	6
4	Italy (ITA)	2	0	1	3
–	Neutral Paralympic Athletes	2	0	1	3
5	Spain (ESP)	2	0	0	2
6	France (FRA)	1	4	2	7
7	United Arab Emirates (UAE)	1	2	0	3
8	Poland (POL)	1	1	4	6
9	Kazakhstan (KAZ)	1	1	3	5
10	Australia (AUS)	1	1	0	2
11	Hungary (HUN)	0	2	1	3
12	China (CHN)	0	1	3	4
13	Czech Republic (CZE)	0	1	0	1
13	Japan (JAP)	0	1	0	1
13	Slovakia (SVK)	0	1	0	1
13	Sweden (SWE)	0	1	0	1
17	Brazil (BRA)	0	0	1	1
17	Denmark (DEN)	0	0	1	1
17	Thailand (THA)	0	0	1	1
Totals (19 entries)		41	41	32	114

== Medallists ==
=== Pistol events ===
==== Individual ====
P1 – Men's 10m Air Pistol SH1
Stage	Venue	1st place, gold medalist(s)	2nd place, silver medalist(s)	3rd place, bronze medalist(s)
1	(South Korea) Changwon	Rudransh Khandelwal (IND)	Manish Narwal (IND)	Kim Jung-nam (KOR)
2	(United Arab Emirates) Al Ain	Manish Narwal (IND)	Angrej Singh (IND)	Kamran Zeynalov (KAZ)

P2 – Women's 10m Air Pistol SH1
Stage	Venue	1st place, gold medalist(s)	2nd place, silver medalist(s)	3rd place, bronze medalist(s)
1	(South Korea) Changwon	Sumedha Pathak (IND)	Shrishti Arora (IND)	Krisztina David (HUN)
2	(United Arab Emirates) Al Ain	Nasrin Shahi Samakhoun (IRI)	Bhakti Sharma (IND)	Faezeh Ahmadi (IRI)

P3 – Mixed 25m Pistol SH1
Stage	Venue	1st place, gold medalist(s)	2nd place, silver medalist(s)	3rd place, bronze medalist(s)
1	(South Korea) Changwon	Amir Ahmed Bhat (IND)	Nihal Singh (IND)	Kim Jung-nam (KOR)
2	(United Arab Emirates) Al Ain	Amir Ahmed Bhat (IND)	Krisztina Dávid (HUN)	Manish Narwal (IND)

P4 – Mixed 50m Pistol SH1
Stage	Venue	1st place, gold medalist(s)	2nd place, silver medalist(s)	3rd place, bronze medalist(s)
1	(South Korea) Changwon	Carlos Alberto Linares Molino (ESP)	Jo Jeong-du (KOR)	Szymon Sowinski (POL)
2	(United Arab Emirates) Al Ain	Akash (IND)	Sandeep Kumar (IND)	Feng Yuexin (CHN)

P5 – Mixed 10m Air Pistol Standard SH1
Stage	Venue	1st place, gold medalist(s)	2nd place, silver medalist(s)	3rd place, bronze medalist(s)
1	(South Korea) Changwon	(International Paralympic Committee) Sergey Malyshev (NPA)	Rudransh Khandelwal (IND)	Kim Jung-nam (KOR)
2	(United Arab Emirates) Al Ain	Rudransh Khandelwal (IND)	Tomas Pesek (CZE)	Angrej Singh (IND)

==== Team ====
P6 - Mixed Team 10m Air Pistol SH1
Stage	Venue	1st place, gold medalist(s)	2nd place, silver medalist(s)	3rd place, bronze medalist(s)
1	(South Korea) Changwon	India; Shrishti Arora; Manish Narwal	South Korea; Moon Aee-kyung; Jo Jeong-du	India; Sumedha Pathak; Rudransh Khandelwal
2	(United Arab Emirates) Al Ain	India; Shrishti Arora; Rudransh Khandelwal	Iran; Seyedmohammadreza Mirshafiei; Faezeh Ahmadi	Kazakhstan; Sevda Aliyeva; Nikita Yermakov

P1 – Men’s 10m Air Pistol SH1
Stage	Venue	1st place, gold medalist(s)	2nd place, silver medalist(s)	3rd place, bronze medalist(s)
1	(South Korea) Changwon	South Korea; Kim Jung-nam; Jo Jeong-du; Park Sea-kyun	India; Manish Narwal; Rudransh Khandelwal; Sandeep Kumar	Poland; Szymon Sowiński; Kacper Pierzyński; Maciej Burzyński
2	(United Arab Emirates) Al Ain	India; Manish Narwal; Nihal Singh; Rudransh Khandelwal	Iran; Seyedmohammadreza Mirshafiei; Mostafa Khademabdolabadi; Rasoul Hajarian Kouhtouri	Not Awarded

P2 – Women’s 10m Air Pistol SH1
Stage	Venue	1st place, gold medalist(s)	2nd place, silver medalist(s)	3rd place, bronze medalist(s)
1	(South Korea) Changwon	India; Rubina Francis; Sumedha Pathak; Shrishti Arora	South Korea; Moon Aee-kyung; Park Myung-soon; Kim Seong-hee	Not Awarded
2	(United Arab Emirates) Al Ain	India; Rubina Francis; Sumedha Pathak; Shrishti Arora	Iran; Nasrin Shahi Samakhoun; Faezeh Ahmadi; Najmeh Saadati Nasab	China; Feng Yuexin; Cui Haijing; Yang Zhiyuan

P3 – Mixed 25m Pistol SH1
Stage	Venue	1st place, gold medalist(s)	2nd place, silver medalist(s)	3rd place, bronze medalist(s)
1	(South Korea) Changwon	India; Amir Ahmed Bhat; Nihal Singh; Rahul Jakhar	South Korea; Kim Jung-nam; Park Sea-kyun; Kim Seong-hee	Not Awarded

P4 – Mixed 50m Pistol SH1
Stage	Venue	1st place, gold medalist(s)	2nd place, silver medalist(s)	3rd place, bronze medalist(s)
1	(South Korea) Changwon	South Korea; Jo Jeong-du; Kim Jung-nam; Park Sea-kyun	India; Nihal Singh; Sanjeev Giri; Shivraj Sankhala	Not Awarded
2	(United Arab Emirates) Al Ain	Iran; Seyedmohammadreza Mirshafiei; Nasrin Shahi Samakhoun; Faezeh Ahmadi	India; Nihal Singh; Rudransh Khandelwal; Sandeep Kumar	China; Zhou Xiaolu; Ding Ding; Lyu Ruihong

P5 – Mixed 10m Air Pistol Standard SH1
Stage	Venue	1st place, gold medalist(s)	2nd place, silver medalist(s)	3rd place, bronze medalist(s)
1	(South Korea) Changwon	South Korea; Kim Jung-nam; Jo Jeong-du; Kim Seong-hee	India; Rudransh Khandelwal; Amir Ahmed Bhat; Sanjeev Giri	Not Awarded

=== Rifle events ===
==== Individual ====
R1 – Men's 10m Air Rifle Standing SH1
Stage	Venue	1st place, gold medalist(s)	2nd place, silver medalist(s)	3rd place, bronze medalist(s)
1	(South Korea) Changwon	Park Jin-ho (KOR)	Yerkin Gabbasov (KAZ)	Lee Jang-ho (KOR)
2	(United Arab Emirates) Al Ain	Yerkin Gabbasov (KAZ)	Radoslav Malenovský (SVK)	Martin Black Jørgensen (DEN)

R2 – Women's 10m Air Rifle Standing SH1
Stage	Venue	1st place, gold medalist(s)	2nd place, silver medalist(s)	3rd place, bronze medalist(s)
1	(South Korea) Changwon	Lee Yunri (KOR)	Mona Agarwal (IND)	Kim Mi-young (KOR)
2	(United Arab Emirates) Al Ain	Avani Lekhara (IND)	Anna Benson (SWE)	Wannipa Leungvilai (THA)

R3 – Mixed 10m Air Rifle Prone SH1
Stage	Venue	1st place, gold medalist(s)	2nd place, silver medalist(s)	3rd place, bronze medalist(s)
1	(South Korea) Changwon	Lee Jang-ho (KOR)	Kim Su-wan (KOR)	Park Jin-ho (KOR)
2	(United Arab Emirates) Al Ain			

R4 – Mixed 10m Air Rifle Standing SH2
Stage	Venue	1st place, gold medalist(s)	2nd place, silver medalist(s)	3rd place, bronze medalist(s)
1	(South Korea) Changwon	Kevin Liot (FRA)	Park Seung-woo (KOR)	Maxence Dupont (FRA)
2	(United Arab Emirates) Al Ain			

R5 – Mixed 10m Air Rifle Prone SH2
Stage	Venue	1st place, gold medalist(s)	2nd place, silver medalist(s)	3rd place, bronze medalist(s)
1	(South Korea) Changwon	Lee Choei-jae (KOR)	Justine Beve (FRA)	Pierre Guillaume-Sage (FRA)
2	(United Arab Emirates) Al Ain			

R6 – Mixed 50m Rifle Prone SH1
Stage	Venue	1st place, gold medalist(s)	2nd place, silver medalist(s)	3rd place, bronze medalist(s)
1	(South Korea) Changwon	Juan Antonio Saavedra Reinaldo (ESP)	Emilia Babska (POL)	Park Jin-ho (KOR)
2	(United Arab Emirates) Al Ain			

R7 – Men's 50m Rifle 3 Positions SH1
Stage	Venue	1st place, gold medalist(s)	2nd place, silver medalist(s)	3rd place, bronze medalist(s)
1	(South Korea) Changwon	Park Jin-ho (KOR)	Csaba Rescsik (HUN)	Marek Dobrowolski (POL)
2	(United Arab Emirates) Al Ain			

R8 – Women's 50m Rifle 3 Positions SH1
Stage	Venue	1st place, gold medalist(s)	2nd place, silver medalist(s)	3rd place, bronze medalist(s)
1	(South Korea) Changwon	Emilia Babska (POL)	Natalie Smith (AUS)	Lee Yoo-jeong (KOR)
2	(United Arab Emirates) Al Ain			

R9 – Mixed 50m Rifle Prone SH2
Stage	Venue	1st place, gold medalist(s)	2nd place, silver medalist(s)	3rd place, bronze medalist(s)
1	(South Korea) Changwon	(International Paralympic Committee) Marina Abdullina (NPA)	Park Seung-woo (KOR)	Seo Hun-tae (KOR)
2	(United Arab Emirates) Al Ain			

==== Team ====
R10 - Mixed Team 10m Air Rifle Standing SH1
Stage	Venue	1st place, gold medalist(s)	2nd place, silver medalist(s)	3rd place, bronze medalist(s)
1	(South Korea) Changwon	South Korea; Lee Yun-ri; Park Jin-ho	South Korea; Lee Yoo-jeong; Kim Su-wan	India; Avani Lekhara; Ishank Ahuja
2	(United Arab Emirates) Al Ain			

R1 – Men's 10m Air Rifle Standing SH1
Stage	Venue	1st place, gold medalist(s)	2nd place, silver medalist(s)	3rd place, bronze medalist(s)
2	(United Arab Emirates) Al Ain	India; Ishank Ahuja; Kavin Vinod Kengnalkar; Deepak Saini	China; Zhang Qi; Xu Jianjie; Liu Jie	Kazakhstan; Yerkin Gabbasov; Arsen Muratov; Ramazan Mukatayev

R3 – Mixed 10m Air Rifle Prone SH1
Stage	Venue	1st place, gold medalist(s)	2nd place, silver medalist(s)	3rd place, bronze medalist(s)
1	(South Korea) Changwon	South Korea; Park Jin-ho; Lee Jang-ho; Lee Yun-ri	Japan; Kazuya Okada; Yusuke Watanabe; Tomoko Katayama	Poland; Emilia Trześniowska; Marek Dobrowolski; Emilia Babska
2	(United Arab Emirates) Al Ain			

R4 – Mixed 10m Air Rifle Standing SH2
Stage	Venue	1st place, gold medalist(s)	2nd place, silver medalist(s)	3rd place, bronze medalist(s)
1	(South Korea) Changwon	South Korea; Seo Hun-tae; Park Seung-woo; Lee Cheol-jae	France; Kevin Liot; Vincent Fagnon; Maxence Dupont	Not Awarded
2	(United Arab Emirates) Al Ain			

R5 – Mixed 10m Air Rifle Prone SH2
Stage	Venue	1st place, gold medalist(s)	2nd place, silver medalist(s)	3rd place, bronze medalist(s)
1	(South Korea) Changwon	South Korea; Park Seung-woo; Lee Cheol-jae; Seo Hun-tae	France; Justine Beve; Pierre Guillaume-Sage; Dylan Kerreneur	Not Awarded
2	(United Arab Emirates) Al Ain			

R6 – Mixed 50m Rifle Prone SH1
Stage	Venue	1st place, gold medalist(s)	2nd place, silver medalist(s)	3rd place, bronze medalist(s)
1	(South Korea) Changwon	Australia; Anton Zappelli; Natalie Smith; Scottie Brydon	South Korea; Park Jin-ho; Lee Yun-ri; Lee Jang-ho	Not Awarded
2	(United Arab Emirates) Al Ain			

R9 – Mixed 50m Rifle Prone SH2
Stage	Venue	1st place, gold medalist(s)	2nd place, silver medalist(s)	3rd place, bronze medalist(s)
1	(South Korea) Changwon	South Korea; Park Seung-woo; Seo Hun-tae; Lee Cheol-jae	France; Justine Beve; Pierre Guillaume-Sage; Dylan Kerreneur	Not Awarded
2	(United Arab Emirates) Al Ain			

=== Shotgun ===
Individual

PT1 - Mixed Trap Seated SG-S
Stage	Venue	1st place, gold medalist(s)	2nd place, silver medalist(s)	3rd place, bronze medalist(s)
1	(South Korea) Changwon	Mohammed Alhashmi (UAE)	Mohammed Alhebsi (UAE)	(International Paralympic Committee) Aleksandr Sakharnov (NPA)
2	(United Arab Emirates) Al Ain			

PT2- Mixed Trap Standing (Lower Limb) SG-L
Stage	Venue	1st place, gold medalist(s)	2nd place, silver medalist(s)	3rd place, bronze medalist(s)
1	(South Korea) Changwon	Antonino Ventre (ITA)	Rajveer Singh Sekhon (IND)	Alessandro Spagnoli (ITA)
2	(United Arab Emirates) Al Ain			

PT3- Mixed Trap Standing (Upper Limb) SG-U
Stage	Venue	1st place, gold medalist(s)	2nd place, silver medalist(s)	3rd place, bronze medalist(s)
1	(South Korea) Changwon	Gabriele Nanni (ITA)	Ahmad Buhaleeba (UAE)	Alexandro Basso (BRA)
2	(United Arab Emirates) Al Ain			
