= Shooting at the 2028 Summer Paralympics – Qualification =

Qualification for shooting at the 2028 Summer Paralympics begins from September 3, 2026. There will be three events for male and female sports shooters and seven mixed events. There will be a total of 150 athlete quotas (75 male, 60 female, 15 gender free).

== Timeline ==
Detailed direct allocation slots are listed in the qualification slots section.

| Events | Dates | Venue | R1 | R2 | R3 | | | R4 | | | R5 | | | R6 | | | R7 | R8 | R9 | | | P1 | P2 | P3 | | | P4 | | | Total Male | Total Female | Total Gender Free | Berths |
| Events | Dates | Venue | M | F | M | F | GF | M | F | GF | M | F | GF | M | F | GF | M | F | M | F | GF | M | F | M | F | GF | M | F | GF | Total Male | Total Female | Total Gender Free | Berths |
|---|---|---|---|---|---|---|---|---|---|---|---|---|---|---|---|---|---|---|---|---|---|---|---|---|---|---|---|---|---|---|---|---|---|
| 2026 World Championships | 3–15 September 2026 | (South Korea) Changwon | 2 | 2 | 1 | 1 | 0 | 1 | 1 | 0 | 1 | 1 | 0 | 1 | 1 | 0 | 2 | 2 | 1 | 1 | 0 | 2 | 1 | 1 | 1 | 0 | 1 | 1 | 0 | 13 | 11 | 0 | 24 |
| 2026 Asian Para Games | 18–24 October 2026 | (Japan) Aichi-Nagoya | 1 | 1 | 0 | 0 | 1 | 0 | 0 | 0 | 1 | 0 | 0 | 0 | 0 | 1 | 0 | 0 | 0 | 0 | 0 | 1 | 1 | 0 | 0 | 1 | 1 | 1 | 0 | 4 | 3 | 3 | 10 |
| 2026 WSPS World Cup | 7-19 December 2026 | (United Arab Emirates) Al-Ain | 1 | 1 | 1 | 1 | 0 | 1 | 1 | 0 | 1 | 1 | 0 | 1 | 0 | 0 | 1 | 1 | 2 | 0 | 0 | 1 | 1 | 1 | 1 | 0 | 1 | 1 | 0 | 11 | 8 | 0 | 19 |
| 2027 WSPS World Cup | TBD | TBD | 1 | 1 | 1 | 0 | 0 | 2 | 0 | 0 | 1 | 2 | 0 | 1 | 2 | 0 | 1 | 1 | 2 | 0 | 0 | 1 | 1 | 1 | 0 | 0 | 0 | 1 | 0 | 11 | 8 | 0 | 19 |
| 2027 Qualifying Competition | TBD | TBD | 1 | 1 | 0 | 0 | 0 | 1 | 1 | 0 | 0 | 0 | 0 | 0 | 0 | 0 | 0 | 0 | 0 | 0 | 0 | 1 | 1 | 0 | 0 | 0 | 0 | 0 | 0 | 3 | 3 | 0 | 6 |
| 2027 Parapan American Games | 20-29 August 2027 | (Peru) Lima | 0 | 0 | 0 | 0 | 1 | 0 | 0 | 0 | 0 | 0 | 1 | 0 | 0 | 0 | 0 | 0 | 0 | 0 | 0 | 1 | 1 | 0 | 0 | 0 | 0 | 0 | 0 | 1 | 1 | 2 | 4 |
| 2027 World Championships | September 2027 | (Croatia) Osijek | 2 | 2 | 1 | 2 | 0 | 1 | 1 | 0 | 1 | 1 | 0 | 2 | 0 | 0 | 2 | 2 | 1 | 1 | 0 | 2 | 2 | 1 | 0 | 0 | 1 | 0 | 0 | 14 | 11 | 0 | 25 |
| 2028 WSPS World Cup | TBD 2028 | (United States) Hillsdale | 1 | 1 | 2 | 1 | 0 | 1 | 1 | 0 | 1 | 1 | 0 | 1 | 1 | 0 | 2 | 2 | 0 | 0 | 1 | 2 | 1 | 0 | 1 | 0 | 1 | 0 | 0 | 11 | 9 | 1 | 21 |
| 2028 European Championships | TBD 2028 | TBD | 0 | 0 | 0 | 0 | 0 | 0 | 0 | 0 | 0 | 0 | 2 | 0 | 0 | 1 | 1 | 1 | 1 | 1 | 0 | 1 | 0 | 0 | 0 | 1 | 0 | 0 | 1 | 3 | 2 | 5 | 10 |
| Host country slots | | | | | | | | | | | | | | | | | | | | | | | | | | | | | | 1 | 1 | 0 | 2 |
| Bipartite commission slots | | | | | | | | | | | | | | | | | | | | | | | | | | | | | | 3 | 3 | 4 | 10 |
| Per event totals | | | 9 | 9 | 13 | | | 12 | | | 15 | | | 12 | | | 9 | 9 | 11 | | | 12 | 9 | 9 | | | 9 | | | 75 | 60 | 15 | 150 |

== Qualification requirements ==
=== Eligibility scores ===
Each athlete from each NPC must at least aim to score targets in each medalling event in the qualifying tournaments.

| Event | | Score |
|---|---|---|
| Rifle | R1 – Men's 10 m air rifle standing SH1 | 600.0 |
| Rifle | R2 – Women's 10 m air rifle standing SH1 | 595.0 |
| Rifle | R3 – Mixed 10 m air rifle prone SH1 | 625.0 |
| Rifle | R4 – Mixed 10 m air rifle standing SH2 | 620.0 |
| Rifle | R5 – Mixed 10 m air rifle prone SH2 | 628.0 |
| Rifle | R6 – Mixed 50 m rifle prone SH1 | 610.0 |
| Rifle | R7 – Men's 50 m rifle 3 positions SH1 | 555 |
| Rifle | R8 – Women's 50 m rifle 3 positions SH1 | 525 |
| Rifle | R9 – Mixed 50 m rifle prone SH2 | 610.0 |
| Pistol | P1 – Men's 10 m air pistol SH1 | 547 |
| Pistol | P2 – Women's 10 m air pistol SH1 | 510 |
| Pistol | P3 – Mixed 25 m sport pistol SH1 | 540 |
| Pistol | P4 – Mixed 50 m pistol SH1 | TBD |

== Summary ==
| Nation | Men | | | Women | | | Mixed | | | | | | | Quotas | Athletes |
| Nation | R1 | R7 | P1 | R2 | R8 | P2 | R3 | R4 | R5 | R6 | R9 | P3 | P4 | Quotas | Athletes |
| 0 NPCs | 9 | 9 | 12 | 9 | 9 | 9 | 13 | 12 | 15 | 12 | 11 | 9 | 9 | 138 | 0 |

== Qualification slots ==
- An NPC may enter a maximum of two (2) eligible athletes per medal event.
- An athlete may only obtain one (1) qualification slot for his/her NPC. An NPC may obtain a maximum of two (2) qualification slots per medal event across all Qualification Competitions. The maximum number of events that an athlete may compete in is three (3).
- An NPC can be allocated a maximum total of twelve (12) qualification slots, with a maximum of eight (8) slots for male athletes or eight (8) slots for female athletes.
- Qualification slots are allocated to the NPCs, not to the individual athlete however in Bipartite Commission Invitation, the slot is allocated to the individual athlete not to the NPC.

=== Pistol ===
==== P1 – Men's 10 m Air Pistol SH1 ====
| Events | Berths | Nation | Qualified athlete | Selected Athlete |
|---|---|---|---|---|
| 2026 World Championships | 2 | South Korea | Jo Jeong-du | |
| 2026 World Championships | 2 | China | Huang Xing | |
| 2026 Asian Para Games | 1 | India | Manish Narwal | |
| 2026 World Cup | 1 | | | |
| 2027 World Cup | 1 | | | |
| 2027 Qualification Competition | 1 | | | |
| 2027 Parapan American Games | 1 | | | |
| 2027 World Championships | 2 | | | |
| 2028 World Cup | 2 | | | |
| 2028 European Championships | 1 | | | |
| Bipartite commission slots | | | | |
| Host country slots | | | | |

==== P2 – Women's 10 m Air Pistol SH1 ====
| Events | Berths | Nation | Qualified athlete | Selected Athlete |
|---|---|---|---|---|
| 2026 World Championships | 1 | Iran | Faezeh Ahmadi | |
| 2026 Asian Para Games | 1 | Iran | Sareh Javanmardi | |
| 2026 World Cup | 1 | | | |
| 2027 World Cup | 1 | | | |
| 2027 Qualification Competition | 1 | | | |
| 2027 Parapan American Games | 1 | | | |
| 2027 World Championships | 2 | | | |
| 2028 World Cup | 1 | | | |
| Bipartite commission slots | | | | |
| Host country slots | | | | |

==== P3 – Mixed 25 m Pistol SH1 ====
| Events | Berths | Nation | Qualified athlete | Selected Athlete |
|---|---|---|---|---|
| 2026 World Championships | 1 (Male) | China | Yang Chao | |
| 2026 World Championships | 1 (Female) | South Korea | Moon Aee-kyung | |
| 2026 Asian Para Games | 1 (Open) | South Korea | Choi Jae-yoon | |
| 2026 World Cup | 1 (Male) | | | |
| 2026 World Cup | 1 (Female) | | | |
| 2027 World Cup | 1 (Male) | | | |
| 2027 World Championships | 1 (Male) | | | |
| 2028 World Cup | 1 (Female) | | | |
| 2028 European Championships | 1 (Open) | | | |
| Bipartite commission slots | | | | |
| Host country slots | | | | |

==== P4 – Mixed 50 m Pistol SH1 ====
| Events | Berths | Nation | Qualified athlete | Selected Athlete |
|---|---|---|---|---|
| 2026 World Championships | 1 (Male) | Spain | Carlos Linares Molino | |
| 2026 Asian Para Games | 1 (Male) | China | Yang Chao | |
| 2026 Asian Para Games | 1 (Female) | Iran | Nasrin Shahi Samakhoun | |
| 2026 World Cup | 1 (Male) | | | |
| 2026 World Cup | 1 (Female) | | | |
| 2027 World Cup | 1 (Female) | | | |
| 2027 World Championships | 1 (Male) | | | |
| 2028 World Cup | 1 (Male) | | | |
| 2028 European Championships | 1 (Open) | | | |
| Bipartite commission slots | | | | |
| Host country slots | | | | |

=== Rifle ===
==== R1 – Men's 10 m Air Rifle Standing SH1 ====
| Events | Berths | Nation | Qualified athlete | Selected Athlete |
|---|---|---|---|---|
| 2026 World Championships | 2 | Slovakia | Radoslav Malenovský | |
| 2026 World Championships | 2 | Hungary | Csaba Rescsik | |
| 2026 Asian Para Games | 1 | Kazakhstan | Yerkin Gabbasov | |
| 2026 World Cup | 1 | | | |
| 2027 World Cup | 1 | | | |
| 2027 Qualification Competition | 1 | | | |
| 2027 World Championships | 2 | | | |
| 2028 World Cup | 1 | | | |
| Bipartite commission slots | | | | |
| Host country slots | | | | |

==== R2 – Women's 10 m Air Rifle Standing SH1 ====
| Events | Berths | Nation | Qualified athlete | Selected Athlete |
|---|---|---|---|---|
| 2026 World Championships | 2 | Serbia | Kristina Trifunović | |
| 2026 World Championships | 2 | India | Mona Agarwal | |
| 2026 Asian Para Games | 1 | India | Avani Lekhara | |
| 2026 World Cup | 1 | | | |
| 2027 World Cup | 1 | | | |
| 2027 Qualification Competition | 1 | | | |
| 2027 World Championships | 2 | | | |
| 2028 World Cup | 1 | | | |
| Bipartite commission slots | | | | |
| Host country slots | | | | |

==== R3 – Mixed 10 m Air Rifle Prone SH1 ====
| Events | Berths | Nation | Qualified athlete | Selected Athlete |
|---|---|---|---|---|
| 2026 World Championships | 1 (Male) | South Korea | Park Jin-ho | |
| 2026 World Championships | 1 (Female) | Slovakia | Veronika Vadovičová | |
| 2026 Asian Para Games | 1 (Open) | China | Zhang Cuiping | |
| 2026 World Cup | 1 (Male) | | | |
| 2026 World Cup | 1 (Female) | | | |
| 2027 World Cup | 1 (Male) | | | |
| 2027 Parapan American Games | 1 (Open) | | | |
| 2027 World Championships | 1 (Male) | | | |
| 2027 World Championships | 2 (Female) | | | |
| 2028 World Cup | 2 (Male) | | | |
| 2028 World Cup | 1 (Female) | | | |
| Bipartite commission slots | | | | |
| Host country slots | | | | |

==== R4 – Mixed 10 m Air Rifle Standing SH2 ====
| Events | Berths | Nation | Qualified athlete | Selected Athlete |
|---|---|---|---|---|
| 2026 World Championships | 1 (Male) | Italy | Tommaso Starec | |
| 2026 World Championships | 1 (Female) | Italy | Livia Cecagallina | |
| 2026 World Cup | 1 (Male) | South Korea | Seo Hun-tae | |
| 2026 World Cup | 1 (Female) | | | |
| 2027 World Cup | 2 (Male) | | | |
| 2027 Qualification Competition | 1 (Male) | | | |
| 2027 Qualification Competition | 1 (Female) | | | |
| 2027 World Championships | 1 (Male) | | | |
| 2027 World Championships | 1 (Female) | | | |
| 2028 World Cup | 1 (Male) | | | |
| 2028 World Cup | 1 (Female) | | | |
| Bipartite commission slots | | | | |
| Host country slots | | | | |

==== R5 – Mixed 10 m Air Rifle Prone SH2 ====
| Events | Berths | Nation | Qualified athlete | Selected Athlete |
|---|---|---|---|---|
| 2026 World Championships | 1 (Male) | Serbia | Dragan Ristić | |
| 2026 World Championships | 1 (Female) | Portugal | Margarida Lapa | |
| 2026 Asian Para Games | 1 (Male) | Thailand | Anuson Chaichamnan | |
| 2026 World Cup | 1 (Male) | | | |
| 2026 World Cup | 1 (Female) | | | |
| 2027 World Cup | 1 (Male) | | | |
| 2027 World Cup | 2 (Female) | | | |
| 2027 Parapan American Games | 1 (Open) | | | |
| 2027 World Championships | 1 (Male) | | | |
| 2027 World Championships | 1 (Female) | | | |
| 2028 World Cup | 1 (Male) | | | |
| 2028 World Cup | 1 (Female) | | | |
| 2028 European Championships | 2 (Open) | | | |
| Bipartite commission slots | | | | |
| Host country slots | | | | |

==== R6 – Mixed 50 m Rifle Prone SH1 ====
| Events | Berths | Nation | Qualified athlete | Selected Athlete |
|---|---|---|---|---|
| 2026 World Championships | 1 (Male) | Poland | Marek Dobrowolski | |
| 2026 World Championships | 1 (Female) | Germany | Natascha Hiltrop | |
| 2026 Asian Para Games | 1 (Open) | South Korea | Park Jin-ho | |
| 2026 World Cup | 1 (Male) | | | |
| 2027 World Cup | 1 (Male) | | | |
| 2027 World Cup | 2 (Female) | | | |
| 2027 World Championships | 2 (Male) | | | |
| 2028 World Cup | 1 (Male) | | | |
| 2028 World Cup | 1 (Female) | | | |
| 2028 European Championships | 1 (Open) | | | |
| Bipartite commission slots | | | | |
| Host country slots | | | | |

==== R7 – Men's 50 m Rifle 3 Positions ====
| Events | Berths | Nation | Qualified athlete | Selected Athlete |
|---|---|---|---|---|
| 2026 World Championships | 2 | | | |
| 2026 World Cup | 1 | | | |
| 2027 World Cup | 1 | | | |
| 2027 World Championships | 2 | | | |
| 2028 World Cup | 2 | | | |
| 2028 European Championships | 1 | | | |
| Bipartite commission slots | | | | |
| Host country slots | | | | |

==== R8 – Women's 50 m Rifle 3 Positions ====
| Events | Berths | Nation | Qualified athlete | Selected Athlete |
|---|---|---|---|---|
| 2026 World Championships | 2 | | | |
| 2026 World Cup | 1 | | | |
| 2027 World Cup | 1 | | | |
| 2027 World Championships | 2 | | | |
| 2028 World Cup | 2 | | | |
| 2028 European Championships | 1 | | | |
| Bipartite commission slots | | | | |
| Host country slots | | | | |

==== R9 – Mixed 50 m Rifle Prone SH2 ====
| Events | Berths | Nation | Qualified athlete | Selected Athlete |
|---|---|---|---|---|
| 2026 World Championships | 1 (Male) | | | |
| 2026 World Championships | 1 (Female) | | | |
| 2026 World Cup | 2 (Male) | | | |
| 2027 World Cup | 2 (Male) | | | |
| 2027 World Championships | 1 (Male) | | | |
| 2027 World Championships | 1 (Female) | | | |
| 2028 World Cup | 1 (Gender-Free) | | | |
| 2028 European Championships | 1 (Male) | | | |
| 2028 European Championships | 1 (Female) | | | |
| Bipartite commission slots | | | | |
| Host country slots | | | | |
