= Shooting at the 2024 Summer Paralympics – P1 Men's 10 metre air pistol SH1 =

Men's 10 metre air pistol SH1 at the XVII Paralympic Games
- Venue: National Shooting Centre
- Dates: 30 August 2024
- Competitors: 26 from 19 nations

Medalists
1st place, gold medalist(s)		Jo Jeong-du	South Korea
2nd place, silver medalist(s)		Manish Narwal	India
3rd place, bronze medalist(s)		Yang Chao	China

The Men's P1 10 metre air pistol SH1 event at the 2024 Summer Paralympics took place on 31 August at the National Shooting Centre in Châteauroux.

The event consisted of two rounds: a qualifier and a final.

The top 8 shooters in the qualifying round moved on to the final round.

== Records ==
Prior to this competition, the existing world and Paralympic records were as follows.

Qualification records
World record	Jo Jeong-du (KOR)	582.0	Changwon, South Korea	27 May 2023
Paralympic record	Valeriy Ponomarenko (RUS)	578.0	Beijing, China	7 September 2008

Final records
World record	Yang Chao (CHN)	241.8	Changwon, South Korea	27 May 2023
Paralympic record	Yang Chao (CHN)	237.9	Tokyo, Japan	31 August 2021

== Schedule ==
All times are Central European Summer Time (UTC+2)

Date	Time	Round
Friday, 30 August 2024	11:15	Qualification
Friday, 30 August 2024	14:00	Final

== Qualification ==
Rank	Shooter	Nation	1	2	3	4	5	6	Total	Inner 10s	Notes
1	Jo Jeong-du	South Korea	97	97	97	94	98	94	57	12	Q
2	Lou Xiaolong	China	97	96	96	94	96	96	575	19	Q
3	Yang Chao	China	92	93	97	95	97	94	568	17	Q
4	Seyed Mohammad Reza Mirshaifiei	Iran	94	92	96	95	96	95	568	13	Q
5	Manish Narwal	India	97	91	91	97	93	96	565	12	Q
6	Buster Antonsen	Denmark	96	95	94	93	92	93	563	17	Q
7	Alexander Reyna	Cuba	92	95	93	93	95	94	562	12	Q
8	Server Ibragimov	Uzbekistan	96	95	91	92	96	92	562	10	Q
9	Rudransh Khandelwal	India	95	95	90	92	95	94	561	14	
10	Daniel Chan	Singapore	88	94	93	95	98	93	561	11	
11	Oleksii Denysiuk	Ukraine	95	90	93	93	96	93	560	11	
12	Muharrem Yamaç	Turkey	95	95	92	91	93	94	560	10	
13	Kamran Zeynalov	Azerbaijan	96	88	94	94	96	91	559	13	
14	Szymon Sowiński	Poland	95	87	95	96	92	93	558	11	
15	Tobias Meyer	Germany	98	93	93	95	91	88	558	10	
16	Yan Xiao Gong	United States	94	90	94	94	93	92	557	12	
17	Murat Oğuz	Turkey	93	94	94	92	89	93	555	9	
18	Živko Papaz	Serbia	86	93	92	95	95	93	554	12	
19	Tomáš Pešek	Czech Republic	86	90	93	96	92	96	553	13	
20	Davide Franceschetti	Italy	90	93	92	90	96	92	553	7	
21	Jakub Kosek	Czech Republic	92	92	91	92	92	91	550	10	
22	Marco de la Rosa	United States	93	93	91	89	93	91	550	9	
23	Gyula Gurisatti	Hungary	90	91	93	91	94	89	548	6	
24	Kim Jung-nam	South Korea	93	89	90	95	91	88	546	9	
25	Ervin Bejdić	Bosnia and Herzegovina	89	90	89	88	89	91	536	7	
26	Di Angelo Loriga	Cuba	90	81	84	84	80	78	497	2	

== Final ==
Rank	Shooter	Nation	1	2	3	4	5	6	7	8	9	Total	Notes
1st place, gold medalist(s)	Yang Chao	China	50.5	100.3	120.6	140.9	162.0	181.6	199.3	217.5	237.9	237.9	
2nd place, silver medalist(s)	Huang Xing	China	48.7	99.0	118.5	139.4	158.3	179.3	197.8	218.7	237.5	237.5	
3rd place, bronze medalist(s)	Singhraj Adhana	India	50.3	99.6	119.6	138.7	157.8	178.1	196.8	216.8	—N/a	216.8	
4	Lou Xiaolong	China	50.1	98.3	118.0	137.5	158.2	177.5	196.5	—N/a		198.9	
5	Server Ibragimov	Uzbekistan	49.2	97.8	118.5	138.5	157.7	177.4	—N/a			177.4	
6	Szymon Sowiński	Poland	48.9	96.2	116.9	136.4	156.4	—N/a				156.4	
7	Manish Narwal	India	47.6	97.2	116.0	135.8	—N/a					137.4	
8	Sergey Malyshev	RPC	46.6	94.7	113.3	—N/a						113.3	
