= Shrishti Arora =

Indian para pistol shooter

Shrishti Arora (born 1995) is an Indian para pistol shooter from Rajasthan. She won the bronze medal in the P2 10 m air pistol SH1 event at the 2026 Asian Para Games in Aichi Nagoya, Japan.

== Early life ==
Arora is from Ajmer, Rajasthan. She was born without her right-hand palm. She took up shooting in 2023 under the guidance of coach Kanhaiya Gurjar.

== Career ==
On 20 October 2026, Arora entered the final of the 10 metre air pistol SH1 category final after finishing fifth in the qualifyiing round with a score of 560-8x at the Aichi Prefectural General Shooting Gallery. In the eight-shooter final, she shot 214.7 to finish behind Iran’s Faezeh Ahmadi (237.3) and Sareh Javanmardi (237.0), who claimed gold and silver respectively.

She made her debut in the National Shooting Championships in 2023. In 2024, she took part in the WSPS World Cup in New Delhi. In 2025, she won a silver in the individual event at the WSPS World Cup in Changwon, South Korea, where she also won gold medals in the P6 Mixed Team event, and theP2 Women’s Team event with World and Asian Records. In November 2025, she also won gold in P6 Mixed Team and P2 Team at the 2025 World Shooting Para Sport World Cup, Al Ain, UAE.
