= Mika Mizuta =

Japanese Paralympic shooter

Personal information
- Born: August 27, 1997 (age 28) Machida, Tokyo, Japan

Sport
- Country: Japan
- Sport: Shooting para sport
- Disability class: SH2
Medal record
Women's shooting para sport
Representing Japan
Paralympic Games
Bronze medal – third place	2024 Paris	Mixed 10 m air rifle prone SH2

Mika Mizuta (水田 光夏, Mizuta Mika; born August 27, 1997) is a Japanese Paralympic shooter. She specializes in 10m air rifle prone shooting (SH2 class).

== Career ==
When Mizuta was in the second year of junior high school, she was diagnosed with Charcot-Marie-Tooth disease, an incurable disease, and her upper limbs (from her right elbow to the fingertips of her left hand) and lower limbs (from both knees to the knees) are paralyzed. She attended Morimura Gakuen Elementary and Junior High School, but due to her illness, she went on to Machida-no-Oka Gakuen, a special needs school for high school. She started shooting beam rifles at the age of 17 and air rifles at the age of 19. Before her injury, she had experience in classical ballet and skiing, and was active in English musicals with the ESS club during her junior high school days.

In 2017, Mizuta placed second in her first appearance at the All Japan Para Rifle Shooting Championships. In 2019, she placed 24th in the mixed air rifle prone event at the World Championships, and was selected to represent Japan at the 2020 Summer Paralympics. In November of the same year, she won her first All Japan Para Rifle Shooting Championships with a personal best score of 633.3 points.

In March 2020, Mizuta started crowdfunding to purchase a new wheelchair for competition, and exceeded her initial goal of 2 million yen in about one month after the start. In March 2020, she graduated from J. F. Oberlin University[6] and joined Hakuju Life Science Institute on an athlete contract. She is currently enrolled in the Business Development Department. At the Tokyo Paralympics in 2021, she participated in the mixed 10m air rifle prone event (SH2 class). She began to experience breathing difficulties, which she had been concerned about, halfway through the event, and was eliminated in the preliminaries in 32nd place.
