= Shooting at the 2024 Summer Paralympics =

Shooting at the XVII Paralympic Games
- Pictogram for Para Shooting
- Venue: National Shooting Centre, Châteauroux
- Dates: 30 August – 5 September 2024
- Competitors: 160 from 51 nations

Shooting at the 2024 Summer Paralympics in Paris, France was held at National Shooting Centre in Châteauroux between 30 August and 5 September 2024.

== Qualification ==
Means of qualification	Date	Venue	Berths	Qualified
2022 World Cup	4–13 June 2022	(France) Châteauroux	18	China (2); France (3); Hungary (1); India (2); Israel (1); Poland (2); Serbia (1); Slovakia (1); Switzerland (1); Thailand (1); Turkey (1); Uzbekistan (1)
2022 WSPS World Championships	3–18 November 2022	(United Arab Emirates) Al Ain	31	Denmark (1); France (3); Germany (1); Great Britain (1); Hungary (1); India (1); Indonesia (1); Iran (3); Italy (1); North Macedonia (1); Serbia (1); Slovakia (1); South Korea (6); Thailand (1); Turkey (1); Ukraine (4); United Arab Emirates (1); United States (1)
2023 WSPS World Championships	19–29 September 2023	(Peru) Lima	33	
2022 Asian Para Games	22–28 October 2023	(China) Hangzhou	8	South Korea (2); India (1); Singapore (1); United Arab Emirates (1); Iran (3)
2023 Parapan American Games	17–25 November 2023	(Chile) Santiago	4	United States (1); Cuba (1); Colombia (1); Brazil (1)
2024 World Cup	6–14 March 2024	(India) New Delhi	20	
2024 WSPS European Championships	30 May–7 June 2024	(Spain) Granada	16	
Bipartite Invitation Allocation	2024		7	
Oceania Allocation			1	
African Allocation			1	
Host Country Allocation	13 September 2017	(Peru) Lima	2	France
Total			160	

== Medal table ==
* Host nation (France)

Rank	NPC	Gold	Silver	Bronze	Total
1	South Korea	3	1	2	6
2	China	2	1	2	5
3	Germany	2	0	0	2
4	Slovakia	1	2	0	3
5	India	1	1	2	4
6	France*	1	1	1	3
7	Iran	1	0	0	1
7	Serbia	1	0	0	1
7	Slovenia	1	0	0	1
10	Brazil	0	1	0	1
10	Georgia	0	1	0	1
10	Kazakhstan	0	1	0	1
10	Sweden	0	1	0	1
10	Turkey	0	1	0	1
10	United States	0	1	0	1
10	Uzbekistan	0	1	0	1
17	Denmark	0	0	1	1
17	Great Britain	0	0	1	1
17	Italy	0	0	1	1
17	Japan	0	0	1	1
17	Poland	0	0	1	1
17	Spain	0	0	1	1
Totals (22 entries)		13	13	13	39

== Medalists ==
=== Men ===
Event	Class	Gold	Silver	Bronze
R1 10 m air rifle standing	SH1	Park Jin-ho; South Korea	Yerkin Gabbasov; Kazakhstan	Martin Black Jørgensen; Denmark
R7 50 m rifle 3 positions	SH1	Park Jin-ho; South Korea	Dong Chao; China	Marek Dobrowolski; Poland
P1 10 m air pistol	SH1	Jo Jeong-du; South Korea	Manish Narwal; India	Yang Chao; China

=== Women ===
Event	Class	Gold	Silver	Bronze
R2 10 m air rifle standing	SH1	Avani Lekhara; India	Lee Yun-ri; South Korea	Mona Agarwal; India
R8 50 m rifle 3 positions	SH1	Natascha Hiltrop; Germany	Veronika Vadovičová; Slovakia	Zhang Cuiping; China
P2 10 m air pistol	SH1	Sareh Javanmardi; Iran	Aysel Özgan; Turkey	Rubina Francis; India

=== Mixed ===
Event	Class	Gold	Silver	Bronze
R3 10 m air rifle prone	SH1	Veronika Vadovičová; Slovakia	Radoslav Malenovský; Slovakia	Juan Antonio Saavedra Reinaldo; Spain
R6 50 m rifle prone	SH1	Natascha Hiltrop; Germany	Anna Benson; Sweden	Jean-Louis Michaud; France
P3 25 m pistol	SH1	Yang Chao; China	Yan Xiao Gong; United States	Kim Jung-nam; South Korea
P4 50 m pistol	SH1	Yang Chao; China	Server Ibragimov; Uzbekistan	Davide Franceschetti; Italy
R4 10 m air rifle standing	SH2	Franček Gorazd Tiršek; Slovenia	Tanguy de La Forest; France	Seo Hun-tae; South Korea
R5 10 m air rifle prone	SH2	Tanguy de La Forest; France	Alexandre Galgani; Brazil	Mika Mizuta; Japan
R9 50 m rifle prone	SH2	Dragan Ristić; Serbia	Vladimer Tchintcharauli; Georgia	Tim Jeffery; Great Britain

== See also ==
- Paralympic shooting
- Shooting at the 2024 Summer Olympics
