= Shooting at the 2024 Summer Paralympics – R4 Mixed 10 metre air rifle standing SH2 =

R4 Mixed 10 metre air rifle standing SH2 at the XVII Paralympic Games
- Venue: National Shooting Centre
- Dates: 30 August 2024
- Competitors: 29 from 21 nations

Medalists
1st place, gold medalist(s)		Franček Gorazd Tiršek	Slovenia
2nd place, silver medalist(s)		Tanguy de la Forest	France
3rd place, bronze medalist(s)		Seo Hun-tae	South Korea

The R4 Mixed 10 metre air rifle standing SH2 event at the 2024 Summer Paralympics took place on 31 August at the National Shooting Centre in Châteauroux.

The event consisted of two rounds: a qualifier and a final.

The top 8 shooters in the qualifying round moved on to the final round.

== Records ==
Prior to this competition, the existing world and Paralympic records were as follows.

Qualification records
World record	Tanguy de la Forest (FRA)	638.7	Changwon, South Korea	25 May 2023
Paralympic record	Andrea Liverani (ITA)	635.3	Tokyo, Japan	30 August 2021

Final records
World record	Tanguy de la Forest (FRA)	255.5	Al Ain, United Arab Emirates	10 December 2023
Paralympic record	Philip Jönsson (SWE)	252.8	Tokyo, Japan	30 August 2021

== Schedule ==
All times are Central European Summer Time (UTC+2)

Date	Time	Round
Friday, 30 August 2024	13:30	Qualification
Friday, 30 August 2024	16:15	Final

== Qualification ==
Rank	Shooter	Nation	1	2	3	4	5	6	Total	Inner 10s	Notes
1	Tanguy de la Forest	France	106.1	106.0	106.4	107.0	106.1	106.6	638.2		Q, QPR
2	Seo Hun-tae	South Korea	105.8	105.1	106.8	106.3	106.7	106.7	637.4		Q
3	Vitalii Plakushchyi	Ukraine	106.0	105.1	105.7	105.9	105.6	106.6	634.9		Q
4	Roberto Lazzaro	Italy	104.5	105.6	104.9	104.4	106.1	106.6	632.1		Q
5	Dejan Jokić	Serbia	105.2	106.6	105.8	105.4	104.3	104.8	632.1		Q
6	Franček Gorazd Tiršek	Slovenia	106.0	106.2	104.2	105.6	105.3	103.9	631.2		Q
7	Park Dong-an	South Korea	104.9	105.4	106.2	105.2	105.4	104.0	631.1		Q
8	Michael Johnson	New Zealand	104.8	105.1	105.9	105.5	105.2	104.3	630.8		Q
9	Sriharsha Devaraddi Ramakrishna	India	105.4	104.9	105.2	105.2	104.8	105.2	630.7		
10	Tim Jeffery	Great Britain	105.3	104.6	106.2	105.1	104.3	105.2	630.7		
11	Nicole Häusler	Switzerland	105.0	104.5	105.6	105.8	105.5	104.2	630.6		
12	Philip Jönsson	Sweden	105.3	105.5	105.0	105.4	103.9	105.3	630.4		
13	Livia Cecagallina	Italy	105.7	105.7	105.0	104.6	105.2	104.2	630.4		
14	Ayesha Al-Shamsi	United Arab Emirates	103.2	106.1	105.7	105.6	105.6	103.9	630.1		
15	Vladimer Tchintcharauli	Georgia	106.2	105.2	105.0	105.5	103.8	104.3	630.0		
16	Kévin Liot	France	105.3	105.0	105.5	104.9	105.2	104.0	629.9		
17	Vasyl Kovalchuk	Ukraine	105.1	105.5	104.3	105.2	105.1	104.3	629.5		
18	Ryan Cockbill	Great Britain	104.6	104.0	105.7	104.9	105.1	104.5	628.8		
19	Fernando Michelena	Spain	103.8	104.8	105.2	104.5	104.3	105.8	628.4		
20	Anuson Chaichamnan	Thailand	105.4	105.3	103.9	105.1	105.1	103.3	628.1		
21	Alexandre Galgani	Brazil	103.9	105.0	105.1	105.3	104.8	103.6	627.7		
22	Ayesha Al-Mehairi	United Arab Emirates	101.9	105.5	105.2	104.2	104.6	105.3	626.7		
23	McKenna Geer	United States	103.7	103.7	106.2	103.7	103.8	105.0	626.1		
24	Panagiotis Giannoukaris	Greece	104.4	104.0	103.5	104.6	105.0	103.7	625.2		
25	Maria Laura Rodriguez	Argentina	104.3	102.4	103.7	102.8	105.1	104.2	622.5		
26	Jazmin Almlie	United States	104.5	102.9	103.2	102.0	103.9	104.4	620.9		
27	Bruno Stov Kiefer	Brazil	101.6	103.9	104.5	101.5	104.1	105.0	620.6		
28	Hakan Çevik	Turkey	101.8	104.3	102.3	104.1	103.7	102.9	619.1		
29	Martin Sørlie-Rogne	Norway	103.4	102.2	101.8	103.6	103.3	104.4	618.7		

== Final ==
Rank	Shooter	Nation	1	2	3	4	5	6	7	8	9	Total	Notes
1st place, gold medalist(s)	Franček Gorazd Tiršek	Slovenia	51.7	104.7	126.1	147.4	168.5	190.0	211.2	232.5	253.3	253.3	PR
2nd place, silver medalist(s)	Tanguy de la Forest	France	53.6	105.6	126.9	147.9	168.6	189.8	211.1	232.3	253.1	253.1	
3rd place, bronze medalist(s)	Seo Hun-tae	South Korea	52.9	106.1	127.0	147.9	169.0	189.8	210.7	231.7		231.7	
4	Vitalii Plakushchyi	Ukraine	52.6	104.8	126.4	147.6	168.4	189.2	210.6			210.6	
5	Michael Johnson	New Zealand	52.8	105.5	126.7	146.7	167.8	188.9				188.9	
6	Roberto Lazzaro	Italy	52.2	104.4	125.8	146.7	166.3					166.3	
7	Park Dong-an	South Korea	51.7	103.6	125.4	146.5						146.5	
8	Dejan Jokić	Serbia	52.7	104.3	125.3							125.3	
