= Anna Benson (sport shooter) =

Swedish sport shooter (born 1984)

Personal information
- Nationality: Swedish
- Born: 20 August 1984 (age 41)

Sport
- Country: Sweden
- Sport: Shooting para sport
- Disability class: SH1
- Event: Air rifle
Medal record
Paralympic Games
Silver medal – second place	2020 Tokyo	50 m rifle prone SH1
Silver medal – second place	2024 Paris	50 m rifle prone SH1
World Championships
Gold medal – first place	2019 Sydney	R8 - Women's 50m Rifle 3 Positions SH1
Silver medal – second place	2018 Cheongju	R6 - Mixed 50m Rifle Prone SH1
Silver medal – second place	2018 Cheongju	R8 - Women's 50m Rifle 3 Positions SH1

Anna Benson (née Normann; born 20 August 1984) is a Swedish sport shooter. She won silver medals in the mixed 50 m rifle prone SH1 event at the 2020 and 2024 Summer Paralympics.
