= Mona Agarwal =

Indian para athlete

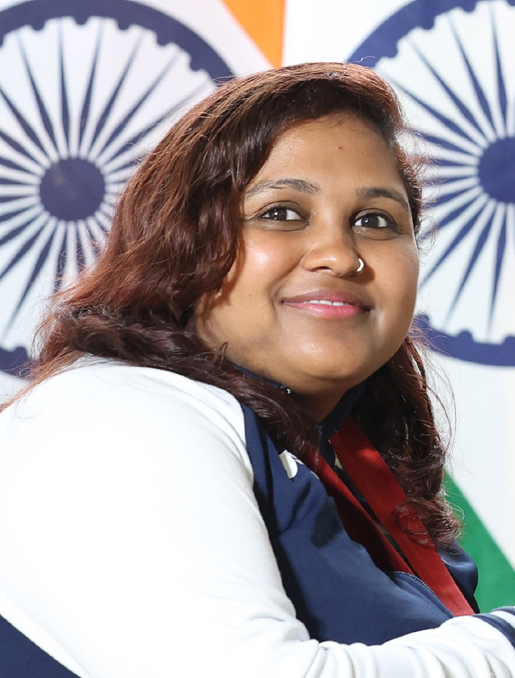
- Agarwal in September 2024

Personal information
- Born: 8 November 1987 (age 38) Sikar, Rajasthan

Sport
- Country: India
- Sport: Para-shooting
Medal record
Representing India
Event	1st	2nd	3rd
Paralympic Games	0	0	1
World Championships	0	1	0
Asian Para Games	2	0	0
World Cup	2	2	1
Total	4	3	2
Women's 10 m Air Rifle Para Shooting SH1
Paralympic Games
Bronze medal – third place	2024 Paris	Individual
World Championships
Silver medal – second place	2026 Changwon	Individual
Asian Para Games
Gold medal – first place	2026 Aichi-Nagoya	Individual
World Cup
Gold medal – first place	2024 New Dehli	Individual
Gold medal – first place	2024 Changwon	Individual
Silver medal – second place	2024 New Dehli	Mixed team
Silver medal – second place	2025 Changwon	Individual
Bronze medal – third place	2023 Osijek	Mixed team
Women's 50 m Rifle three positions SH1
Asian Para Games
Gold medal – first place	2026 Aichi-Nagoya	Individual

Mona Agarwal (born 8 November 1987) is an Indian para-shooter who competes in the women's rifle events respectively. She represented India at the 2024 Summer Paralympics and won the bronze medal in the women's 10 metre air rifle SH1 event. She also won two gold medals at the 2026 Asian Games.

== Early life ==
Agarwal was born in Sikar, Rajasthan. She took up shooting in December 2021 after trying different sports, including volleyball. Her husband, Ravindra Chaudhary, a former wheelchair basketball player, suffered a brain injury in an accident and has been in rehab at home. She got a polio attack when she was nine months old. She shifted to Jaipur after marriage. Due to stigma against girls, she could not complete her schooling. After two elder sisters, her parents wanted a boy but Mona was an 'unwanted' child in the conservative family. But her paternal grandmother, Geetha Devi, supported her. She has two children.

== Career ==
Agarwal made her international debut at the World Cup in Osijek, Croatia, in July 2023. In March 2024, she won a gold medal at the World Cup in New Delhi. She won another gold at the Para World Cup in Changwon, Korea in April 2024. In May 2025, she won a silver medal at the Para World Cup in Changwon.

In September 2026, Agarwal won the silver medal in the women's 10 metre air rifle SH1 event at the 2026 World Championships held in Changwon, South Korea, and secured the Paralympic quota for the nation for the 2028 Summer Paralympics.
