= Davide Franceschetti =

Italian Paralympic shooter (born 1991)

Personal information
- Nationality: Italian
- Born: 28 January 1991 (age 35)
- Home town: San Vito al Tagliamento, Italy

Sport
- Sport: Paralympic shooting
- Disability class: SH1
Medal record
Men's paralympic shooting
Representing Italy
Paralympic Games
Bronze medal – third place	2024 Paris	Mixed 50 m pistol SH1
European Para Championships
Gold medal – first place	2023 Rotterdam	10 m air pistol SH1

Davide Franceschetti (born 28 January 1991) is an Italian Paralympic shooter. He represented Italy at the 2024 Summer Paralympics.

== Career ==
Franceschetti represented Italy at the 2024 Summer Paralympics and won a bronze medal in the Mixed 25 metre pistol SH1 event.
