= Natascha Hiltrop =

German Paralympic sport shooter

Personal information
- Born: 18 July 1992 (age 33)

Sport
- Country: Germany
- Sport: Shooting para sport
- Disability class: SH1
- Event: R3, R6, R8
Medal record
Paralympic Games
Gold medal – first place	2020 Tokyo	R3 mixed 10 m air rifle prone SH1
Gold medal – first place	2024 Paris	R8 women's 50 m rifle 3 positions SH1
Gold medal – first place	2024 Paris	R6 mixed 50 m rifle prone SH1
Silver medal – second place	2016 Rio de Janeiro	R3 mixed 10 m air rifle prone SH1
Silver medal – second place	2020 Tokyo	R8 women's 50 m rifle 3 positions SH1

Natascha Hiltrop (born 18 July 1992) is a German Paralympic sport shooter. She is a four-time medalist, including two gold medals, at the Summer Paralympics. She represented Germany at the Summer Paralympics in 2012, 2016, 2021 and 2024.

She won the gold medal in the mixed 10 metre air rifle prone SH1 event at the 2020 Summer Paralympics held in Tokyo, Japan. She also won the silver medal in the mixed 10 metre air rifle prone SH1 event in 2016.

In 2018, she became the European champion at the 2018 World Shooting Para Sport European Championships held in Belgrade, Serbia.
