= Shooting at the 2022 Asian Para Games =

- Location: Hangzhou, China
- Dates: 24–27 October

Shooting at the 2022 Asian Para Games was held in Hangzhou, China.

== Entries ==
1. R1 - Men's 10m Air Rifle Standing SH1 - 11 Athletes
2. R7 - Men's 50m Rifle 3 Positions SH1 - 12 Athletes
3. P1 - Men's 10m Air Pistol SH1 - 22 Athletes
4. R2 - Women's 10m Air Rifle Standing SH1 - 12 Athletes
5. R8 - Women's 50m Rifle 3 Positions SH1 - 9 Athletes
6. P2 - Women's 10m Air Pistol SH1 - 22 Athletes
7. R3 - Mixed 10m Air Rifle Prone SH1 - 23 Athletes
8. R4 - Mixed 10m Air Rifle Standing SH2 - 17 Athletes
9. R5 - Mixed 10m Air Rifle Prone SH2 - 20 Athletes
10. R6 - Mixed 50m Rifle Prone SH1 - 20 Athletes
11. R9 - Mixed 50m Rifle Prone SH2 - 13 Athletes
12. P3 - Mixed 25m Pistol SH1 - 12 Athletes
13. P4 - Mixed 50m Pistol SH1 - 18 Athletes

== Ranking ==
Source:

== Nations ==
1. Bhutan (1) in 1 events
2. China (14) in 40 events
3. Hong Kong (5) in 5 events
4. India (15) in 27 events
5. Indonesia (4) in 5 events
6. Iran (6) in 12 events
7. Iraq (1) in 1 events
8. Japan (4) in 6 events
9. Kazakhstan (5) in 8 events
10. South Korea (13) in 36 events
11. Malaysia (1) in 1 events
12. Mongolia (2) in 5 events
13. Singapore (1) in 1 events
14. Chinese Taipei (5) in 6 events
15. Thailand (12) in 31 events
16. United Arab Emirates (10) in 20 events
17. Uzbekistan (2) in 3 events

== Athletes ==
Source:

== Records ==
Source:

== Medal table ==
Rank	NPC	Gold	Silver	Bronze	Total
1	China (CHN)	4	5	4	13
2	South Korea (KOR)	3	3	3	9
3	India (IND)	2	2	2	6
4	Thailand (THA)	2	1	1	4
5	United Arab Emirates (UAE)	1	1	2	4
6	Iran (IRI)	1	1	0	2
7	Japan (JPN)	0	0	1	1
Totals (7 entries)		13	13	13	39

== Results ==
1. R8 - Women's 50m Rifle 3 Positions SH1
2. R7 - Men's 50m Rifle 3 Positions SH1
3. R5 - Mixed 10m Air Rifle Prone SH2
4. P3 - Mixed 25m Pistol SH2
5. R6 - Mixed 50m Rifle Prone SH1
6. R4 - Mixed 10m Air Rifle Standing SH2
7. R3 - Mixed 10m Air Rifle Prone SH1
8. P1 - Men's 10m Air Pistol SH1
9. P2 - Women's 10m Air Pistol SH1
10. R1 - Men's 10m Air Rifle Standing SH1
11. P4 - Mixed 50m Pistol SH1
12. R2 - Women's 10m Air Rifle Standing SH1
13. R9 - Mixed 50m Rifle Prone SH2

== Medalists ==
=== Men ===
Event	Class	Gold	Silver	Bronze
P1 10 m air pistol	SH1	Huang Xing; China	Rudransh Khandelwal; India	Manish Narwal; India
R1 10 m air rifle standing	SH1	Lee Jang-ho; South Korea	Park Jin-ho; South Korea	Dong Chao; China
R7 50 m rifle 3 positions	SH1	Abdullah Sultan Alaryani; United Arab Emirates	Dong Chao; China	Lee Jang-ho; South Korea

=== Women ===
Event	Class	Gold	Silver	Bronze
P2 10 m air pistol	SH1	Faezeh Ahmadi; Iran	Sareh Javanmardi; Iran	Rubina Francis; India
R2 10 m air rifle standing	SH1	Avani Lekhara; India	Zhong Yixin; China	Zhang Cuiping; China
R8 50 m rifle 3 positions	SH1	Zhang Cuiping; China	Zhong Yixin; China	Lee Yun-ri; South Korea

=== Mixed ===
Event	Class	Gold	Silver	Bronze
P3 25 m pistol	SH1	Huang Xing; China	Kim Jung-nam; South Korea	Lou Xiaolong; China
P4 50 m pistol	SH1	Yang Chao; China	Rudransh Khandelwal; India	Huang Xing; China
R3 10 m air rifle prone	SH1	Atidet Intanon; Thailand	Xie Huanyu; China	Saif Mohammed Alnuaimi; United Arab Emirates
R6 50 m rifle prone	SH1	Sidhartha Babu; India	Dong Chao; China	Abdullah Sultan Alaryani; United Arab Emirates
R4 10 m air rifle standing	SH2	Lee Myung-ho; South Korea	Park Seung-woo; South Korea	Wongsathon Kunthong; Thailand
R5 10 m air rifle prone	SH2	Lee Cheol-jae; South Korea	Anuson Chaichamnan; Thailand	Mika Mizuta; Japan
R9 50 m rifle prone	SH2	Anuson Chaichamnan; Thailand	Saif Ahmed Aldhaheri; United Arab Emirates	Lee Cheol-jae; South Korea

== See also ==
- Shooting para sport
- Shooting at the 2022 Asian Games
