= Martin Black Jørgensen =

Danish para sport shooter

Personal information
- Born: 18 May 1992 (age 34)

Sport
- Country: Denmark
- Sport: Shooting para sport
- Disability class: SH1
- Event: R1
Medal record
Men's shooting para sport
Representing Denmark
Paralympic Games
Bronze medal – third place	2024 Paris	R1 men's 10 m air rifle standing SH1

Martin Black Jørgensen (born 18 May 1992) is a Danish para sport shooter. He won the bronze medal in the R1 10m air rifle standing SH1 event at the 2024 Summer Paralympics.
