= Nihal Singh (sport shooter) =

Indian para athlete

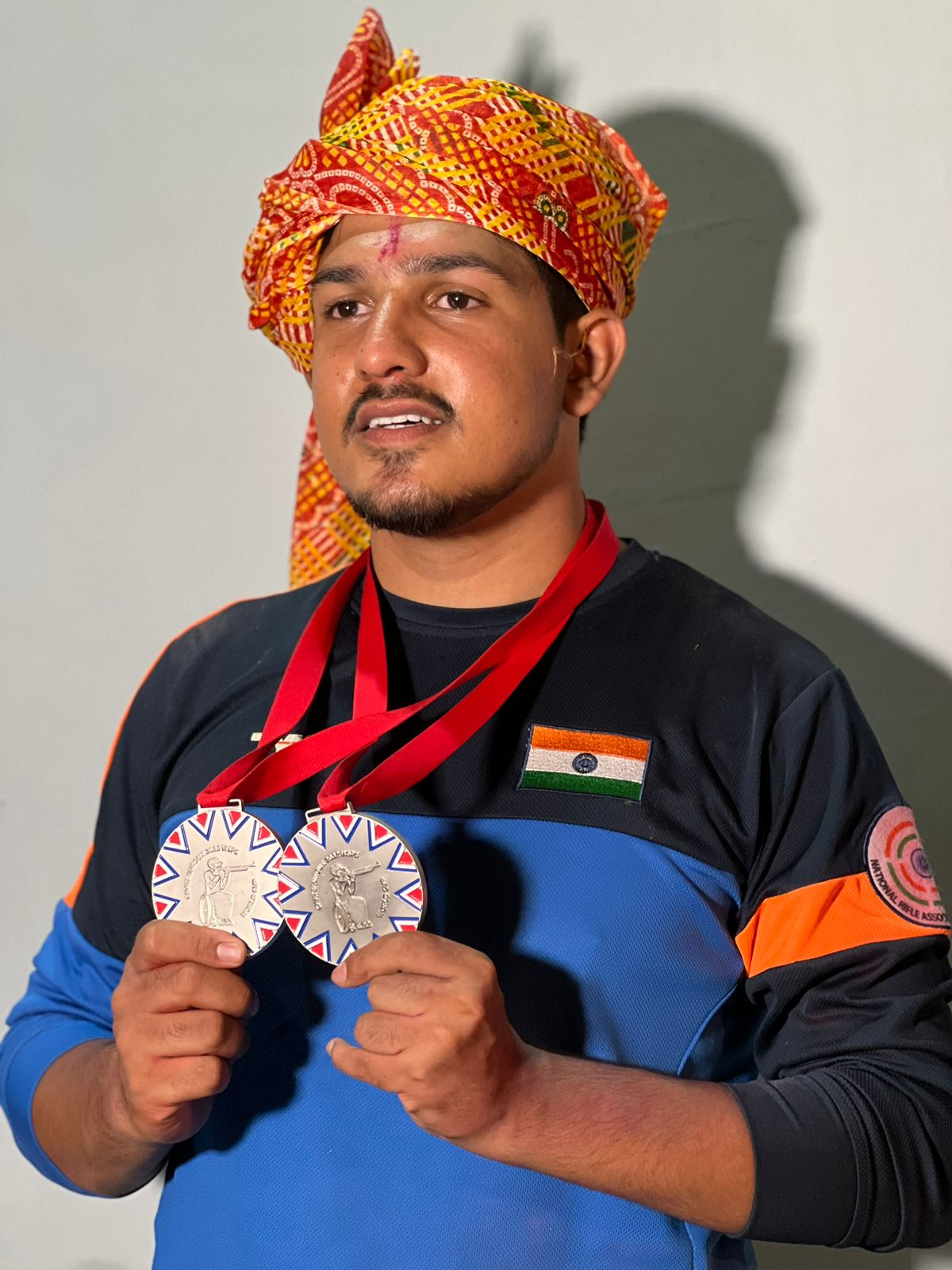
Nihal Singh

Nihal Singh (born 22 April 1999) is an Indian para shooter from Rajasthan. He competes in the P3 25m pistol individual event in SH1 category. He qualified to represent India at the 2024 Summer Paralympics at Paris. Despite his quota berth in 50m pistol event being surrendered due to new limitation of quotas per country in each category, he made it to the Paralympics in the P3 25 m pistol SH1 event and also played the mixed event. He finished 10th with a score of 569 in the qualification round and missed the finals. In the P4 50 m pistol SH1 event, he scored 522 and finished 19th in the qualification round.

== Early life ==
Singh was born in Khanpur Ahir - Khaithal, a village situated on the Rajasthan-Haryana border. He is from an agrarian family. In 2015, he convinced his mother to enroll him at the Indira Gandhi Stadium in Alwar. Later, he joined the Sports Authority of India training centre. He completed his B.A. and post graduation from Rajasthan University.

== Career ==
Singh won a bronze medal at the Para Shooting World Cup at New Delhi in March 2024. He won a silver medal in the mixed 50m pistol event; he shot 527 and won a silver medal along with Rudransh Khandelwal (530) and Singhraj Adhana (516) to aggregate a total score of 1573. He won a gold and a silver at the World Shooting Para Sport World Cup in Osijek, Croatia in October 2023. In the 2022 World Shooting Para-Sports (WPS) World Championship at Al Ain, in November 2022, he finished fourth in the qualification final. ahead of Singhraj.
