= Shooting at the 2024 Summer Paralympics – R1 Men's 10 metre air rifle standing SH1 =

Men's 10 metre air rifle standing SH1 at the XVII Paralympic Games
- Venue: National Shooting Centre
- Dates: 31 August 2024
- Competitors: 18 from 13 nations

Medalists
| 1st place, gold medalist(s) | | Park Jin-ho | South Korea |
| 2nd place, silver medalist(s) | | Yerkin Gabbasov | Kazakhstan |
| 3rd place, bronze medalist(s) | | Martin Black Jørgensen | Denmark |

The Men's R110 metre air rifle standing SH1 event at the 2024 Summer Paralympics took place on 31 August at the National Shooting Centre in Châteauroux.

The event consisted of two rounds: a qualifier and a final.

The top 8 shooters in the qualifying round moved on to the final round.

== Records ==
Prior to this competition, the existing world and Paralympic records were as follows.

Qualification records
| World record | Park Jin-ho (KOR) | 631.3 | Tokyo, Japan | 30 August 2021 |
| Paralympic record | Park Jin-ho (KOR) | 631.3 | Tokyo, Japan | 30 August 2021 |

Final records
| World record | Park Jin-ho (KOR) | 250.5 | Changwon, South Korea | 25 May 2023 |
| Paralympic record | Dong Chao (CHN) | 246.4 | Tokyo, Japan | 30 August 2021 |

== Schedule ==
All times are Central European Summer Time (UTC+2)

| Date | Time | Round |
|---|---|---|
| Saturday, 31 August 2024 | 9:30 | Qualification |
| Saturday, 31 August 2024 | 12:15 | Final |

== Qualification ==
| Rank | Shooter | Nation | 1 | 2 | 3 | 4 | 5 | 6 | Total | Notes |
|---|---|---|---|---|---|---|---|---|---|---|
| 1 | Park Jin-ho | South Korea | 103.3 | 103.3 | 103.3 | 104.5 | 105.5 | 104.5 | 624.4 | Q |
| 2 | Martin Black Jørgensen | Denmark | 102.7 | 104.5 | 103.3 | 105.1 | 102.9 | 103.3 | 621.8 | Q |
| 3 | Dong Chao | China | 102.7 | 104.3 | 103.6 | 102.9 | 104.1 | 104.0 | 621.6 | Q |
| 4 | Jan Winther | Denmark | 103.6 | 103.3 | 103.0 | 104.2 | 105.3 | 101.6 | 621.0 | Q |
| 5 | Sotirios Galogavros | Greece | 103.5 | 101.7 | 102.1 | 103.8 | 105.3 | 104.0 | 620.4 | Q |
| 6 | Yerkin Gabbasov | Kazakhstan | 104.6 | 102.6 | 102.3 | 103.0 | 103.8 | 103.2 | 619.5 | Q |
| 7 | Andrii Doroshenko | Ukraine | 104.3 | 102.9 | 102.0 | 103.7 | 104.4 | 101.5 | 618.8 | Q |
| 8 | Csaba Rescsik | Hungary | 104.2 | 103.2 | 102.2 | 102.5 | 103.9 | 102.6 | 618.6 | Q |
| 9 | Abdulla Sultan Al-Aryani | United Arab Emirates | 100.7 | 102.1 | 101.4 | 105.5 | 103.4 | 105.2 | 618.3 | |
| 10 | Ren Bo | China | 103.1 | 103.6 | 102.8 | 103.0 | 102.3 | 103.5 | 618.3 | |
| 11 | Shim Young-jip | South Korea | 104.3 | 104.6 | 104.5 | 101.6 | 100.2 | 100.8 | 616.0 | |
| 12 | Didier Richard | France | 101.9 | 102.7 | 102.2 | 102.3 | 103.2 | 103.1 | 615.4 | |
| 13 | Obaid Al-Dahmani | United Arab Emirates | 102.1 | 100.3 | 101.4 | 104.8 | 103.7 | 101.6 | 613.9 | |
| 14 | Swaroop Unhalkar | India | 101.8 | 103.0 | 101.7 | 101.8 | 102.4 | 102.7 | 613.4 | |
| 15 | Jorge Arcela | Peru | 102.0 | 101.4 | 103.6 | 100.1 | 102.6 | 100.0 | 609.7 | |
| 16 | Marek Dobrowolski | Poland | 98.9 | 101.9 | 102.4 | 102.9 | 101.8 | 100.9 | 608.8 | |
| 17 | Laslo Šuranji | Serbia | 99.1 | 100.5 | 98.3 | 100.3 | 98.7 | 101.6 | 598.5 | |
| 18 | Jean-Louis Michaud | France | 103.4 | 102.7 | 103.9 | 103.7 | 103.9 | 79.4 | 597.0 | |

== Final ==
| Rank | Shooter | Nation | 1 | 2 | 3 | 4 | 5 | 6 | 7 | 8 | 9 | Total | Notes |
|---|---|---|---|---|---|---|---|---|---|---|---|---|---|
| 1st place, gold medalist(s) | Park Jin-ho | South Korea | 51.4 | 51.7 | 20.8 | 20.2 | 20.8 | 20.9 | 21.1 | 21.1 | 21.4 | 249.4 | PR |
| 2nd place, silver medalist(s) | Yerkin Gabbasov | Kazakhstan | 52.4 | 52.5 | 20.6 | 19.8 | 20.2 | 20.1 | 21.3 | 20.4 | 20.4 | 247.7 | |
| 3rd place, bronze medalist(s) | Martin Black Jørgensen | Denmark | 52.5 | 50.6 | 21.4 | 20.9 | 20.3 | 20.6 | 20.8 | 19.4 | —N/a | 226.5 | |
| 4 | Andrii Doroshenko | Ukraine | 51.7 | 51.4 | 20.6 | 21.0 | 20.5 | 21.2 | 20.0 | —N/a | | 206.4 | |
| 5 | Dong Chao | China | 52.2 | 50.7 | 20.9 | 20.7 | 20.6 | 19.5 | —N/a | | | 184.6 | |
| 6 | Jan Winther | Denmark | 51.4 | 51.7 | 19.5 | 20.6 | 20.8 | —N/a | | | | 164.0 | |
| 7 | Csaba Rescsik | Hungary | 50.6 | 49.0 | 20.9 | 19.5 | —N/a | | | | | 140.0 | |
| 8 | Sotirios Galogavros | Greece | 49.5 | 50.5 | 20.5 | —N/a | | | | | | 120.5 | |
