= Yang Chao (sport shooter) =

Chinese paralympic sport shooter

Sport
- Country: China
- Sport: Paralympic shooting
- Disability class: SH1
Medal record
Representing China
Paralympic Games
Men's shooting para sport
Gold medal – first place	2016 Rio de Janeiro	10 m air pistol
Gold medal – first place	2020 Tokyo	10 m air pistol
Gold medal – first place	2024 Paris	Mixed 25 m pistol SH1
Gold medal – first place	2024 Paris	Mixed 50 m pistol SH1
Silver medal – second place	2016 Rio de Janeiro	Mixed 50 m pistol
Bronze medal – third place	2024 Paris	10 m air pistol
Asian Para Games
Gold medal – first place	2022 Hangzhou	Mixed 50 m pistol

Yang Chao (born 7 May 1979) is a Chinese paralympic sport shooter.

== Career ==
He participated at the 2016 Summer Paralympics in the shooting competition, and won a gold medal in the men's 10 m air pistol event, scoring 571.0. and won a silver medal in the mixed 50 m pistol event, scoring 538.0. He participated at the 2020 Summer Paralympics in the shooting competition, and won a gold medal in the men's 10 m air pistol event, scoring 237.9.
