= Dragan Ristić =

Serbia Paralympic sport shooter

Personal information
- Born: 9 October 1978 (age 48) Kragujevac, Serbia
- Years active: 2005–

Sport
- Country: Serbia
- Sport: Shooting para sport
- Disability class: SH2
- Event: Men's R4-10m Air Rifle Standing - SH2, Men's R5-10m Air Rifle Prone - SH2, Men's R9-50m Rifle Prone - SH2
- Club: SK Čika Mata Kragujevac
- Coached by: Vladimir Pajić and Dragan Marković
Medal record
Shooting para sport
Representing Serbia
Paralympic Games
Gold medal – first place	2020 Tokyo	Mixed 10 m air rifle prone SH2
Gold medal – first place	2020 Tokyo	Mixed 50 m rifle prone SH2
Gold medal – first place	2024 Paris	Mixed 50 m rifle prone SH2
World Championships
Gold medal – first place	2010 Zagreb	Men's R5 10m air rifle prone SH2
Gold medal – first place	2018 Cheongju	Men's R5 10m air rifle prone SH2
Gold medal – first place	2019 Sydney	Men's R9 50m rifle prone SH2
Silver medal – second place	2014 Suhl	Men's R5 10m air rifle prone SH2
Silver medal – second place	2019 Sydney	Men's R5 10m air rifle prone SH2

Dragan Ristić (Serbian Cyrillic: Драган Ристић, born 9 October 1978) is a Serbian male paralympic shooter competing in the rifle events. He won a gold and silver medal at the World Shooting Para Sport Championships in Sydney. He won two gold medals at the Tokyo 2020 Paralympic Games and successfully defended his gold medal in one of the events at the Paris 2024 Olympic Games.

== Early life ==
In 1999 he was involved in a traffic accident, which resulted in spinal cord injuries.
