= Alexandre Galgani =

Brazilian paralympic sport shooter

Personal information
- Full name: Alexandre Augusto Galgani
- Born: 25 April 1983 (age 43) Americana, São Paulo, Brazil

Sport
- Country: Brazil
- Sport: Shooting para sport
- Disability class: SH2
Medal record
Shooting para sport
Representing Brazil
Paralympic Games
Silver medal – second place	2024 Paris	Mixed 10 m air rifle prone SH2
Parapan American Games
Silver medal – second place	2019 Lima	Mixed 10 m air rifle prone SH2
Gold medal – first place	2023 Santiago	Mixed 10 m air rifle standing SH2
Silver medal – second place	2023 Santiago	Mixed 10 m air rifle prone SH2

Alexandre Augusto Galgani (born 25 April 1983) is a Brazilian paralympic sport shooter. He competed at the 2024 Summer Paralympics, winning the silver medal in the mixed 10 m air rifle prone SH2 event.
