= Jean-Louis Michaud =

French Paralympic shooter (born 1982)

Personal information
- Nationality: French
- Born: 5 November 1982 (age 43) Montreuil, Seine-Saint-Denis, France

Sport
- Country: Sweden
- Sport: Shooting para sport
- Disability class: SH1
Medal record
Men's shooting para sport
Representing France
Paralympic Games
| Bronze medal – third place | 2024 Paris | R6 Mixed 50 metre rifle prone SH1 |

Jean-Louis Michaud (born 5 November 1982) is a French Paralympic shooter. He represented France at the 2024 Summer Paralympics.

== Career ==
Michaud represented France at the 2024 Summer Paralympics and won a bronze medal in the R6 mixed 50 metre rifle prone SH1 event.
