= Server Ibragimov =

Uzbekistani sport shooter

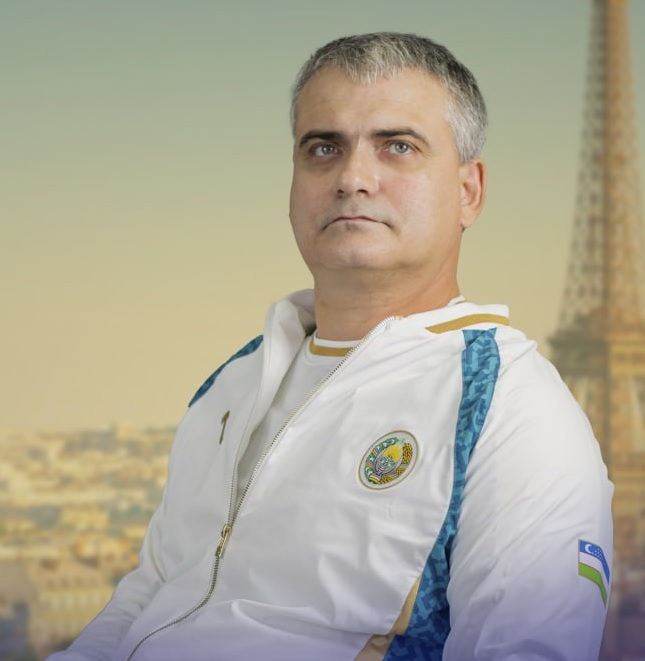

Personal information
- Born: 28 November 1978 (age 47) Guliston, Uzbekistan

Sport
- Country: Uzbekistan
- Sport: Paralympic shooting
Medal record
Paralympic Games
Silver medal – second place	2024 Paris	Mixed 50 m pistol SH1
Bronze medal – third place	2016 Rio de Janeiro	10 metre air pistol SH1

Server Ibragimov is an Uzbekistani sport shooter. He represented Uzbekistan at the 2016 Summer Paralympics held in Rio de Janeiro, Brazil and he won the bronze medal in the men's 10 metre air pistol SH1 event. He qualified to represent Uzbekistan at the 2020 Summer Paralympics in Tokyo, Japan after winning the silver medal at the 2018 World Shooting Para Sport Championships held in Cheongju, South Korea.
