= Park Jin-ho =

South Korean Paralympic sport shooter

Personal information
- Born: 9 June 1977 (age 49) Seoul, South Korea

Sport
- Country: South Korea
- Sport: Shooting para sport
- Disability class: SH1
- Event: R1, R3, R7
Medal record
Men's shooting para sport
Representing South Korea
Paralympic Games
| Gold medal – first place | 2024 Paris | R1 men's 10 m air rifle standing SH1 |
| Gold medal – first place | 2024 Paris | R7 men's 50 m rifle 3 positions SH1 |
| Silver medal – second place | 2020 Tokyo | R3 mixed 10 m air rifle prone SH1 |
WSPS World Cup
| Gold medal – first place | 2025 Changwon | R1 men's 10 m air rifle standing SH1 |
Asian Para Games
| Silver medal – second place | 2022 Hangzhou | R1 men's 10 m air rifle standing SH1 |

Park Jin-ho (born 9 June 1977) is a South Korean Paralympic sport shooter.

== Career ==
He won the bronze medal in the men's 10-metre air rifle standing SH1 event at the 2020 Summer Paralympics held in Tokyo, Japan. He also competed at the 2016 Summer Paralympics held in Rio de Janeiro, Brazil.
