= Rudransh Khandelwal =

Indian para shooter

Rudransh Khandelwal (born 19 November 2006) is an Indian para shooting athlete from Bharatpur, Rajasthan. He competes in pistol events in the SH1 classification, including the P1 men's 10 metre air pistol SH1, P5 10 metre air pistol standard mixed SH1, P6 mixed team air pistol SH1, and P4 mixed 50 metre pistol SH1 events. He has represented India at the 2024 Summer Paralympics, the Asian Para Games, World Shooting Para Sport World Cups, and the World Shooting Para Sport Championships.

== Early life ==
Khandelwal was born on 19 November 2006 in Bharatpur, Rajasthan. In January 2015, during a family wedding, he lost his left leg below the knee in a firework-related accident. After his recovery, he took up shooting around a year later and began training seriously. He trained at SBN Shooting Academy in Bharatpur under coach Sumit Rathi.

== Career ==
=== National career ===
In 2022, Khandelwal competed at the 3rd National Para Shooting Championship in Mhow, where he won five gold medals and three silver medals across team and individual pistol events in 10 metre and 50 metre categories. He also set a national junior record. Later in 2022, he was selected for the Indian national para shooting team.

=== 2023 season ===
Khandelwal's first international competition was the 2023 World Shooting Para Sport World Cup in Changwon, South Korea. At the event, he won a bronze medal in the 50 metre pistol mixed team event.

At the 2023 World Shooting Para Sport World Cup in Osijek, Croatia, Khandelwal won two gold medals in the P4 mixed 50 metre pistol SH1 event, in the individual and team categories. In the individual final, he scored 231.1 and set a world record.

At the same competition, he also won two gold medals in the P1 men's 10 metre air pistol SH1 individual and team events. In the individual final, he scored 240.6 and set a junior world record.

In 2023, Khandelwal competed at the World Shooting Para Sport Championships in Lima, Peru. He won two silver medals in the P4 mixed 50 metre pistol SH1 individual and team events. His performance also earned India a quota place for the 2024 Summer Paralympics in Paris.

He represented India at the 2022 Asian Para Games, held in Hangzhou, China in 2023. At the Games, he won two silver medals: one in the men's 10 metre air pistol SH1 event and another in the 50 metre pistol mixed SH1 event.

=== 2024 season ===
In March 2024, Khandelwal competed at the 2024 World Shooting Para Sport World Cup in New Delhi. He won a gold medal in the P5 10 metre air pistol standard mixed SH1 event and set a junior qualification record. He also won silver medals in the P4 50 metre pistol mixed SH1 individual and team events, a silver medal in the P1 men's 10 metre air pistol SH1 team event, and a bronze medal in the P6 mixed team air pistol SH1 event.

Khandelwal qualified for the 2024 Summer Paralympics in Paris. He represented India in the P4 mixed 50 metre pistol SH1 event, where he scored 517 in qualification and finished 22nd. He also competed in the P1 men's 10 metre air pistol SH1 event, where he scored 561 in qualification and finished 9th, narrowly missing the final.

=== 2025 season ===
In 2025, Khandelwal competed at the World Shooting Para Sport World Cup in Changwon, South Korea. He won the P1 men's 10 metre air pistol SH1 title. He also won a silver medal in the P1 men's 10 metre air pistol SH1 team event, two silver medals in the P5 10 metre air pistol standard mixed SH1 individual and team events, and a bronze medal in the P6 mixed team air pistol SH1 event.

He also competed at the World Shooting Para Sport World Cup in Al Ain, United Arab Emirates. At the competition, he won gold medals in the P1 men's 10 metre air pistol SH1 team event, the P5 10 metre air pistol standard mixed SH1 event, and the P6 mixed team air pistol SH1 event. He also won a silver medal in the P4 50 metre pistol mixed SH1 team event.

== Achievements ==
Khandelwal's career includes national and international medals, world record performances, Asian Para Games medals, World Championship medals, and participation at the Paris 2024 Paralympic Games. His reported career medal tally includes 42 national medals and 24 international medals.

== Major results ==
Year	Competition	Event	Result	Reference
2022	3rd National Para Shooting Championship, Mhow	10m and 50m pistol events	5 gold medals, 3 silver medals, national junior record	
2023	WSPS World Cup, Changwon	50m pistol mixed team SH1	Bronze medal	
2023	WSPS World Cup, Osijek	P4 mixed 50m pistol SH1 individual	Gold medal, world record	
2023	WSPS World Cup, Osijek	P4 mixed 50m pistol SH1 team	Gold medal	
2023	WSPS World Cup, Osijek	P1 men's 10m air pistol SH1 individual	Gold medal, junior world record	
2023	WSPS World Cup, Osijek	P1 men's 10m air pistol SH1 team	Gold medal	
2023	World Shooting Para Sport Championships, Lima	P4 mixed 50m pistol SH1 individual	Silver medal	
2023	World Shooting Para Sport Championships, Lima	P4 mixed 50m pistol SH1 team	Silver medal	
2023	Asian Para Games, Hangzhou	Men's 10m air pistol SH1	Silver medal	
2023	Asian Para Games, Hangzhou	50m pistol mixed SH1	Silver medal	
2024	WSPS World Cup, New Delhi	P5 10m air pistol standard mixed SH1	Gold medal, junior qualification record	
2024	WSPS World Cup, New Delhi	P4 50m pistol mixed SH1 individual	Silver medal	
2024	WSPS World Cup, New Delhi	P4 50m pistol mixed SH1 team	Silver medal	
2024	WSPS World Cup, New Delhi	P1 men's 10m air pistol SH1 team	Silver medal	
2024	WSPS World Cup, New Delhi	P6 mixed team air pistol SH1	Bronze medal	
2024	Summer Paralympics, Paris	P4 mixed 50m pistol SH1	22nd in qualification	
2024	Summer Paralympics, Paris	P1 men's 10m air pistol SH1	9th in qualification	
2025	WSPS World Cup, Changwon	P1 men's 10m air pistol SH1 individual	Gold medal	
2025	WSPS World Cup, Changwon	P1 men's 10m air pistol SH1 team	Silver medal	
2025	WSPS World Cup, Changwon	P5 10m air pistol standard mixed SH1 individual	Silver medal	
2025	WSPS World Cup, Changwon	P5 10m air pistol standard mixed SH1 team	Silver medal	
2025	WSPS World Cup, Changwon	P6 mixed team air pistol SH1	Bronze medal	
2025	WSPS World Cup, Al Ain	P1 men's 10m air pistol SH1 team	Gold medal	
2025	WSPS World Cup, Al Ain	P5 10m air pistol standard mixed SH1 individual	Gold medal	
2025	WSPS World Cup, Al Ain	P6 mixed team air pistol SH1	Gold medal	
2025	WSPS World Cup, Al Ain	P4 50m pistol mixed SH1 team	Silver medal	

== See also ==
- Shooting Para sport
- India at the 2024 Summer Paralympics
- Shooting at the 2024 Summer Paralympics
- India at the 2022 Asian Para Games
