= Seo Hun-tae =

South Korean para air rifle shooter

Personal information
- Born: 26 January 1985 (age 41) South Korea

Sport
- Country: South Korea
- Sport: Shooting para sport
- Disability class: SH2
Medal record
Men's shooting para sport
Representing South Korea
Paralympic Games
Bronze medal – third place	2024 Paris	Mixed 10 m air rifle standing SH2
World Championships
Silver medal – second place	2022 Al Ain	Mixed 10 m air rifle standing SH2

Seo Hun-tae (born 26 January 1985) is a South Korean Paralympic shooter. He represented South Korea at the 2024 Summer Paralympics.

== Career ==
Seo competed at the 2022 World Shooting Para Sport Championships and won a silver medal in mixed 10 m air rifle standing SH2 event.

He represented South Korea at the 2024 Summer Paralympics and won a bronze medal in the mixed 10 metre air rifle standing SH2 event.
