= Radoslav Malenovský =

Slovak Paralympic sport shooter

Personal information
- Nationality: Slovak
- Born: 15 November 1986 (age 39) Skalica, Czechoslovakia

Sport
- Country: Slovakia
- Sport: Shooting para sport
- Disability class: SH1
Medal record
Men's shooting para sport
Representing Slovakia
Paralympic Games
Silver medal – second place	2024 Paris	Mixed 10 m air rifle prone SH1

Radoslav Malenovský (born 15 November 1986) is a Slovak sport shooter.

Malenovský got partly disabled after jumping into water at the age of 16. He competed at the 2024 Summer Paralympics and won the silver medal in the R3 mixed 10m air rifle prone SH1 event.
