= Amir Ahmed Bhat =

Indian para athlete

Amir Ahmed Bhat (born 1995) is an Indian para shooter from Kashmir. He competes in the P3-25m Pistol mixed event in SH1 category. He qualified to represent India at the 2024 Summer Paralympics at Paris.

== Early life and education ==
Bhat is born to Abdul Hamid Bhat, from Damhall in Kokernag (Anantnag) of Kashmir Division. He is employed with the Indian Army as a Junior Commissioned Officer. He did his schooling at Government Higher Secondary School, Damhall, Anantnag. Later, he did his plus two at Government Higher Secondary School, Dialgam. After completing his Class 12, he joined Indian Army's regimental Jammu and Kashmir Light Infantry squad as a soldier.

== Career ==
Bhat won a bronze medal won in the World Shooting Para Sport (WSPS) World Cup held in Changwon, South Korea in March 2023 at Peru, Lima. He also won a silver medal in the WSPS World Cup held in Osijek Croatia in July 2023. He also played for Jammu and Kashmir at the first Khelo India Para Games where he scored 540 points in 50m free pistol to get a gold medal.
