= Yerkin Gabbasov =

Kazakh paralympic sport shooter

Personal information
- Born: 9 September 1983 (age 42)

Sport
- Country: Kazakhstan
- Sport: Shooting para sport
- Disability class: SH1
- Event: R1
Medal record
Men's shooting para sport
Representing Kazakhstan
Paralympic Games
Silver medal – second place	2024 Paris	R1 men's 10 m air rifle standing SH1
WSPS World Cup
Silver medal – second place	2025 Changwon	R1 men's 10 m air rifle standing SH1

Yerkin Gabbasov (born 9 September 1983) is a Kazakh paralympic sport shooter. He competed at the 2024 Summer Paralympics, winning the silver medal in the men's 10 m air rifle standing SH1 event.
