= Kim Jung-nam (sport shooter) =

South Korean paralympic sport shooter

Sport
- Country: South Korea
- Sport: Paralympic shooting
Medal record
Shooting para sport
Representing South Korea
Paralympic Games
Bronze medal – third place	2024 Paris	Mixed 25 m pistol
Asian Para Games
Silver medal – second place	2022 Hangzhou	Mixed 25 m pistol

Kim Jung-nam is a South Korean paralympic sport shooter. He competed at the 2024 Summer Paralympics, winning the bronze medal in the mixed 25 m pistol SH1 event.
