= Jo Jeong-du =

South Korean para pistol shooter (born 1987)

Personal information
- Born: 12 February 1987 (age 39) Daejeon, South Korea

Sport
- Country: South Korea
- Sport: Paralympic shooting
- Disability class: P1, P3, P4, P5, P6
Medal record
Paralympic Games
Gold medal – first place	2024 Paris	10 m air pistol SH1
World Championships
Gold medal – first place	2022 Abu Dhabi	10m Air Pistol SH1
Gold medal – first place	2023 Lima	10m Air Pistol SH1 - Team
Bronze medal – third place	2023 Lima	50m Pistol SH1

Jo Jeong-du (Korean: 조정두; born 12 February 1987) is a South Korean Para Pistol Shooter. He won a gold medal in the 10m Air Pistol SH1 event at the 2024 Summer Paralympics in Paris.

Jo won a gold medal at the 2022 World Shooting Para Sport Championships held in Al Ain, United Arab Emirates.
