= Marek Dobrowolski =

Polish para sport shooter

Personal information
- Born: 12 December 1997 (age 28)

Sport
- Country: Poland
- Sport: Shooting para sport
- Disability class: SH1
- Event: R7
Medal record
Men's shooting para sport
Representing Poland
Paralympic Games
Bronze medal – third place	2024 Paris	R7 50 m rifle 3 positions SH1

Marek Dobrowolski (born 12 December 1997) is a Polish para sport shooter. He competed in the 2024 Summer Paralympics and won the bronze medal in the R7 men's 50 m rifle 3 positions SH1 event.
