= SH2 (classification) =

Paralympic shooting classification

SH2 is a Paralympic shooting classification.

== Sport ==
This Paralympic shooting sport class is designated to shooters with a more severe impairment in the upper limbs, which necessitates them to use a shooting stand. Unlike the SH1 class they shoot with a rifle only and not with pistols.

== Becoming classified ==
Sub-classifications A, B and C define wheelchair backrest height depending on back and pelvic strength per athlete. Ambulant or wheelchair using shooters regardless of sub-classifications A, B or C shoot together in this class.

Classification is handled by International Paralympic Committee Shooting.

== IPC Shooting Classification Rules and Regulations ==
The IPC Shooting Classification Rules and Regulations were published and came into force in May 2012. The rules reflect the wording of the IPC Classification Code and are a revised version of the previous IPC Classification Rules.

== See also ==
- SH1 (classification)
- Para-shooting classification
