= Manish Narwal =

Indian para pistol shooter and Paralympic medalist

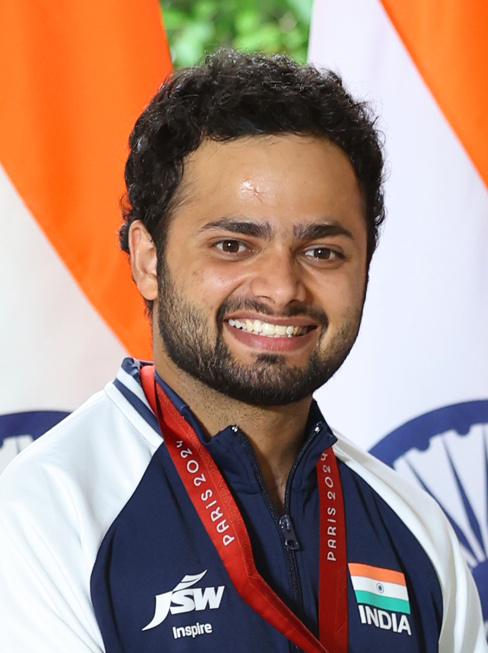
- Narwal in September 2024

Personal information
- Years active: 2018–present

Sport
- Country: India
- Disability class: SH1

Achievements and titles
- Paralympic finals: 2020 Tokyo (gold); 2024 Paris (silver)
Medal record
Representing India
Men's Air-pistol Shooting SH1
Paralympic Games
Gold medal – first place	2020 Tokyo	Mixed 50 m
Silver medal – second place	2024 Paris	Men's 10 m
Asian Para Games
Bronze medal – third place	2022 Hangzhou	Men's 10 m

Manish Narwal (born 17 October 2001) is an Indian para-pistol shooter. He is currently ranked second in Men's 10m Air Pistol SH1 world rankings. He won a silver medal at the 2024 Summer Paralympics in Paris. He is currently supported by Olympic Gold Quest, a sports NGO.

== Career ==
He began shooting in 2016 in Ballabhgarh. Narwal pistol shooting in 2016 at Faridabad in the Haryana State, was where he made history by setting a world record while clinching gold in the P4 mixed 50m pistol SH1 event at the 2021 Para Shooting World Cup. He won several medals, including gold, silver and bronze medals in the national and International events.

=== Award ===
In 2020, Manish took The Arjuna Award, officially known as the Arjuna Awards for Outstanding Performance in Shooting sports. The Arjuna Award was the highest sporting honour of Republic of India. It is awarded annually by the Ministry of Youth Affairs and Sports.

=== 2020 Summer Paralympics ===
Manish Narwal qualified for the Paralympics Games in Tokyo and represented Team India at the Shooting Paralympic of the 2020 Summer Paralympics. He won a gold medal for India in Mixed P4 – 50 m pistol SH1.

== Honours ==
- 2021 – Khel Ratna Award, highest sporting honour of India.

== See also ==
- Paralympic Committee of India
- India at the Paralympics
