= Shooting Para sport classification =

Disability sport classification system

Shooting Para sport classification is the classification in place for shooting Para sport to help establish fair competition. Classification is governed by the International Paralympic Committee's IPC Shooting. While there are currently three classifications, there were originally five in international competitions. People with physical disabilities as defined by the International Paralympic Committee are eligible to compete.

== Definition ==
Shooting classification at the Paralympic Games is the basis for determining who can compete in the sport and within which class. Classification is used to establish fair competition. Entry is eligible to male and female athletes with a physical disability. There are three classifications for shooting Para sport, with the classification system being based on functional ability.

== Governance ==
Previously governed by the International Shooting Committee for the Disabled., shooting is currently governed through IPC Shooting under the International Paralympic Committee (IPC). IPC Shooting sets out sport rules (including classification rules and guidelines) in their document IPC Shooting Classification Rules and Regulations May 2012.

The National Federation for the sport in Australia is the Australian Paralympic Committee, who fund the Australian Paralympic Shooting program.

== History ==
There were originally five classifications in international competitions. In 1983, classification for shooters with cerebral palsy was done by the Cerebral Palsy-International Sports and Recreation Association. The classification used the classification system designed for field athletics events. In 1983, there were five cerebral palsy classifications for its competitors. Class 2 competitors could compete in co-ed division 1 Class 1 and Class 2 events with the use of assistance including a sling, trigger aid and support stand. In 1983, Cerebral Palsy-International Sports and Recreation Association (CP-ISRA) set the eligibility rules for classification for this sport. They defined cerebral palsy as a non-progressive brain legion that results in impairment. People with cerebral palsy or non-progressive brain damage were eligible for classification by them. The organization also dealt with classification for people with similar impairments. For their classification system, people with spina bifida were not eligible unless they had medical evidence of loco-motor dysfunction. People with cerebral palsy and epilepsy were eligible provided the condition did not interfere with their ability to compete. People who had strokes were eligible for classification following medical clearance. Competitors with multiple sclerosis, muscular dystrophy and arthrogryposis were not eligible for classification by CP-ISRA, but were eligible for classification by International Sports Organisation for the Disabled for the Games of Les Autres. By the early 1990s, the shooting classification system had moved away from medical based system to a functional classification system. Because of issues in objectively identifying functionality that plagued the post Barcelona Games, the IPC unveiled plans to develop a new classification system in 2003. This classification system went into effect in 2007, and defined ten different disability types that were eligible to participate on the Paralympic level. It required that classification be sport specific, and served two roles. The first was that it determined eligibility to participate in the sport and that it created specific groups of sportspeople who were eligible to participate and in which class. The IPC left it up to International Federations to develop their own classification systems within this framework, with the specification that their classification systems use an evidence based approach developed through research.

As of 2011, there were three classifications.

== Eligibility ==
Male and female athletes with a physical disability (as defined by the IPC) can compete. There are competitions for men, women and mixed in standing and wheelchair disciplines, with rifle and pistol events. As of 2012, people with visual disabilities are eligible to compete in this sport.

== Classes ==
There are two broad classes within shooting Para sport:

- SH1: Using a rifle or pistol, athletes are able to support their firearm without assistance.
- SH2: Using a rifle only, athletes support their firearm with the assistance of a shooting stand.

Within these two classes, athletes are further sub-classified as follows:

- SH1 sub-classes. These subclasses are used to determine height of backrests permitted. If competitors compete standing they must only be supported by ordinary prosthesis/orthosis. Arm prosthesis must not have fixed elbows or grip the rifle.

Shooting chairs are allowed in rifle prone events. All competitors classed within SH1 compete in the SH1 class, regardless of their sub-classification.

- SH1A: Athletes may compete sitting or standing. Torso strength and function is normal. No backrest permitted.
- SH1B: Athletes compete sitting. Severe impairment to lower limbs but normal function in pelvis (m.quadratus lumborum). Low backrest permitted.
- SH1C. Athletes compete sitting. No function in the lower limbs, or severe impairment in lower limbs coupled with impairment in the torso. High backrest permitted.

- SH2 Sub classes. These sub-classes are used to determine the height of backrests permitted and spring flexibility. With exception to an IPC certified shooting stand (which is either used on a table or tripod) no other devices are allowed to support the rifle. All competitors classed within SH2 compete in the SH2 class, regardless of their sub-classification.

- SH2A. Athletes compete sitting or standing. Severe impairment to both upper limbs or non-function to one upper limb. Normal torso strength and function. No backrest permitted.
- SH2B. Athletes compete sitting. Severe impairment or non-function to lower limbs. Normal pelvis control. Low backrest permitted.
- SH2C. Athletes compete sitting. Severe impairment or non-function in lower limbs. Impairment or non-function in torso. High backrest permitted.

== Process ==
For a shooting Para sport athlete to compete at the Paralympic Games, international classification by an International Classification Panel is required. The International Classification Panel will allocate a class to the athlete and if any assistive equipment (such as a shooting stand) the athlete may use. Their ruling overrides all prior classifications including those of a national basis. Athletes must be classified according to their disability and level of impairment. The classification process normally involves a physical assessment to authenticate the disability and evaluate the degree of limitation, plus a technical assessment where the athlete will be observed in non-competition action. Results will place the athlete in one of the two classes (see Classes): this evaluation cannot be used for sports outside of Shooting. In the event that an athlete is deemed ineligible, they will be given an assessment of Sport Class Not Eligible (NE). As with other Paralympic sports, athletes may need to undergo the classification process more than once if their impairment is of a progressive nature.

For Australian shooters, the sport and classification are managed by the national sport federation with support from the Australian Paralympic Committee. Three types of classification are available for Australian competitors: Provisional, national and international. The first is for club level competitions, the second for state and national competitions and the third for international competitions.

== At the Paralympic Games ==
The sport first appeared on the Paralympic programme at the 1976 Summer Paralympics. Competitors with cerebral palsy classifications were allowed to compete at the Paralympics for the first time at the 1984 Summer Paralympics. At the 1992 Summer Paralympics, amputee and wheelchair disability types were eligible to participate, with classification being run through the International Paralympic Committee, with classification being done based on functional disability type. At the 1996 Summer Paralympics, classification for this sport was done at the venue because classification assessment required watching a competitor play the sport. At the 2000 Summer Paralympics, 7 assessments were conducted at the Games. This resulted in 0 class changes after a PPS classification was challenged by a classifier and was upheld. At the 2012 Summer Paralympics 100 male and 40 female athletes from all over the world competed in Shooting.

The 2012 Paralympic Shooting competition was held at The Royal Artillery Barracks from 30 August to 5 September, with 9 medal events in standing and seated classes held. A maximum of five athletes per country were allowed to compete in a shooting class, while a maximum of three athletes per country were allowed to compete in a single event.

For the 2016 Summer Paralympics in Rio, the International Paralympic Committee had a zero classification at the Games policy. This policy was put into place in 2014, with the goal of avoiding last minute changes in classes that would negatively impact athlete training preparations. All competitors needed to be internationally classified with their classification status confirmed prior to the Games, with exceptions to this policy being dealt with on a case-by-case basis. In case there was a need for classification or reclassification at the Games despite best efforts otherwise, shooting classification was scheduled for September 6 at the Olympic Shooting Centre.

== Prominent athletes ==
At 70 years of age, Paralympic class SH1 shooter and nine times gold medallist Libby Kosmala was Australia's oldest competitor at the London 2012, Paralympic class SH1 shooter and In Paratrap Shooting, class SH2, Asian Record Holder Harshit Tiwari was Indias Prominent competitor at the WSPS Paralympic Championship 2019.

== Future ==
Going forward, disability sport's major classification body, the International Paralympic Committee, is working on improving classification to be more of an evidence-based system as opposed to a performance-based system so as not to punish elite athletes whose performance makes them appear in a higher class alongside competitors who train less.
