= SH1 (classification) =

Paralympic shooting classification

SH1 is a Paralympic shooting classification.

== Sport ==
Athletes in this Paralympic shooting sport class either shoot with a pistol or a rifle. They do not require a shooting stand, because their arms are affected by impairment to a lesser extent and allow for sufficient support of the pistol or rifle. Eligible pistol shooters, for example, have an impaired non-shooting arm, such as amputation or muscle weakness.

== Becoming classified ==
Sub-classifications A, B and C define wheelchair backrest height depending on back and pelvic strength per athlete. Ambulant or wheelchair using shooters regardless of sub-classifications A, B or C shoot together in this class.

Classification is handled by International Paralympic Committee Shooting.

== IPC Shooting Classification Rules and Regulations ==
The IPC Shooting Classification Rules and Regulations were published and came into force in May 2012. The rules reflect the wording of the IPC Classification Code and are a revised version of the previous IPC Classification Rules.

== See also ==
- SH2 (classification)
- Para-shooting classification
