= Shooting Para sport =

Competitive shooting sport

- Highest governing body: International Paralympic Committee

Characteristics
- Mixed-sex: Yes

Presence
- World Championships: Yes
- Paralympic: Yes

Shooting Para sport is an adaptation of shooting sports for competitors with disabilities. Shooting is a test of accuracy and control, in which competitors use pistols or rifles to fire a series of shots at a stationary target. Each shot is worth a maximum score of 10.9 points. Athletes use .22 caliber rifles, pistols and .177 caliber air guns (compressed air or pneumatic). Paralympic shooting first appeared in the Summer Paralympics at the 1976 Toronto Games.

Competitions are open to all athletes with a physical disability. Shooting utilizes a functional classification system, which enables wheelchair users and ambulant athletes from different disability classes to compete together either individually or in teams.

Athletes compete in rifle and pistol events from distances of 10, 25 and 50 meters, in men's, women's and mixed competitions. Of the 12 Paralympic Shooting events, six are open to both women and men, three are open to women only and three are open to men only.

The sport is governed by International Paralympic Committee (IPC) and co-ordinated by the World Shooting Para Sport Technical Committee following the modified rules of the International Shooting Sport Federation (ISSF). These rules consider the differences that exist between shooting for the able-bodied and shooting for persons with a disability.

In November 2016, IPC changed the official name of the sport to "shooting Para sport", and renamed the coordinating committee from "IPC Shooting Sport Technical Committee" to reflect this change. In 2026, an agreement was signed to transfer governance of shooting Para sport from IPC to ISSF.

== Classification system ==
Only SH1 and SH2 classes are represented in the Paralympic Games, based on World Shooting Para Sport Classification Rules and Regulations.

- SH1 – Shooters able to support a firearm without a stand
- SH2 – Shooters requiring a firearm support to shoot
- SH3 – Blind Shooters (sights seek sound-emitting targets)

Sub-classifications A, B and C define wheelchair backrest height depending on back and pelvic strength per athlete.

== Equipment adaptations ==
Disabled shooters use the same firearms and clothing as able-bodied shooters. Adaptations are equipment specific :

- Separate shooting table for ambulant competitors or integrated table for wheelchair users in prone or 3-position events.
- Shooting chair for ambulant competitors or wheelchair for users in prone or 3-position events.
- Shooting jacket shortened for seated competitors - jacket edge terminate atop shooters' thighs when seated.
- Rifle stand with spring tension dependent SH2 shooter's degree of ability to support a rifle.

The World Shooting Para Sport rules are adapted partially from ISSF rules. In 10m Air Rifle Prone and .22 Rifle Prone, slings are required for SH1 shooters while SH2 shooters are not allowed to use a sling. Ambulant and wheelchair users have very specific equipment instructions in the World Shooting Para Sport rulebook.

== Rifle events ==
Both SH1 and SH2 class shooters use the following positions depending on event, with the 3-position (Standing, Kneeling, Prone) involving all three.

- Standing (standing or seated, shooting table support not allowed)
- Kneeling (Seated, single elbow support on shooting table plus use of a sling)
- Prone (Seated or prone, both elbows supported atop a shooting table plus use of a sling)

The Minimum Qualification Scores (MQS) for Regional and World Championships (MQS, 2012 LON Paralympic Games).

SH1 Class

Event	Discipline	Gender	MQS
R1	10m Air Rifle Standing	Men	545
R2	10m Air Rifle Standing	Women	355
R3	10m Air Rifle Prone	Mixed	575
R6	50m Rifle Prone	Mixed	560
R7	50m Rifle 3-position 3×40	Men	1060
R8	50m Rifle 3-position 3×20	Women	525

SH2 Class

Event	Discipline	Gender	MQS
R4	10m Air Rifle Standing	Mixed	570
R5	10m Air Rifle Prone	Mixed	575
R9	50m Prone Rifle	Mixed	560

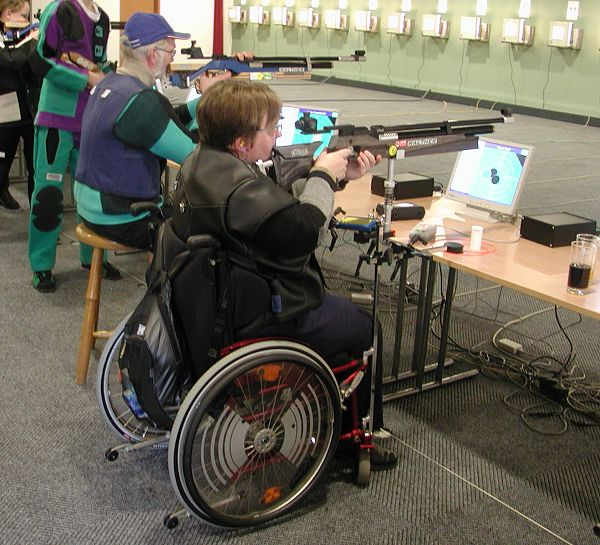
Para shooting with a rifle sitting in a wheelchair.

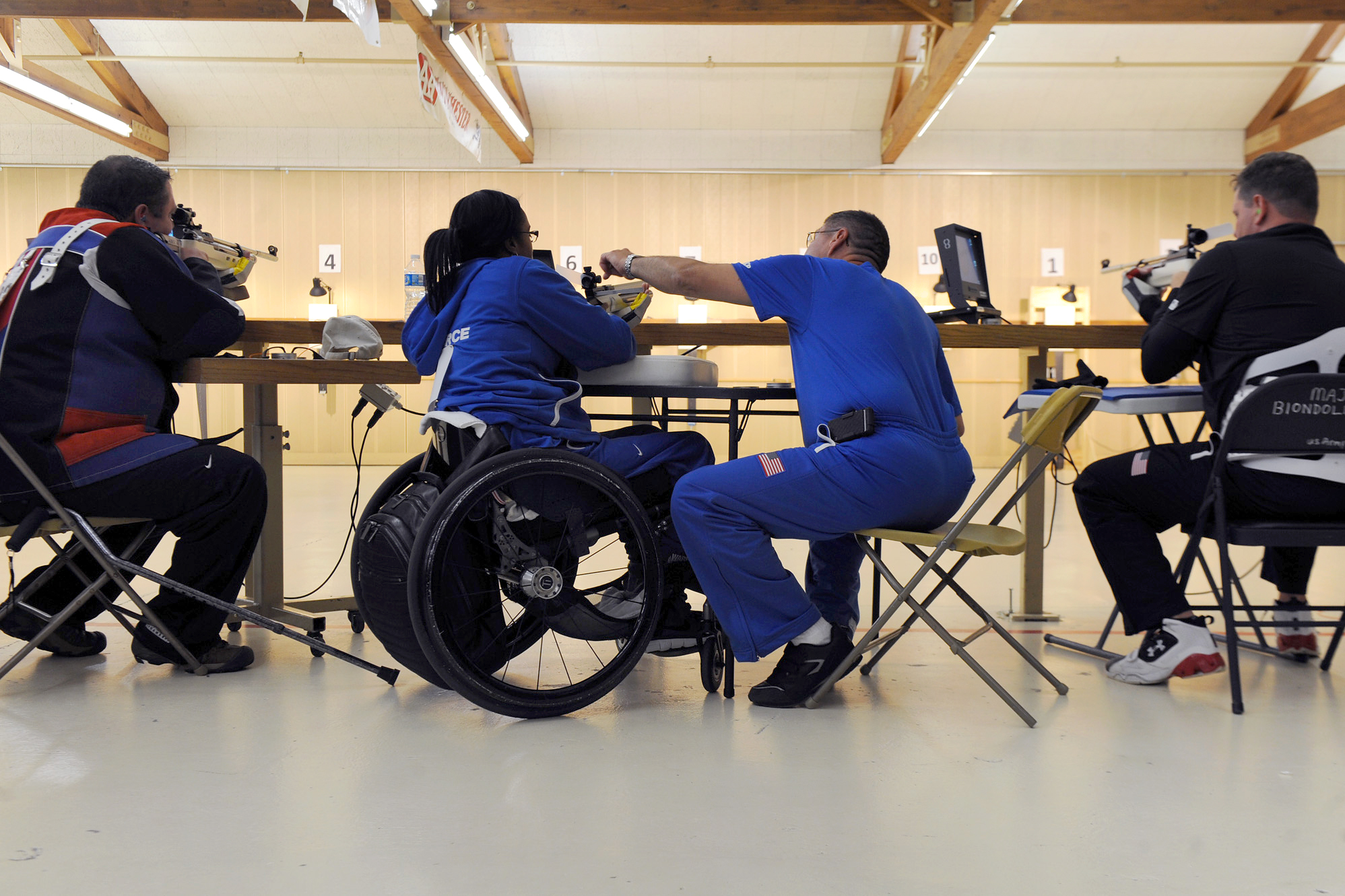

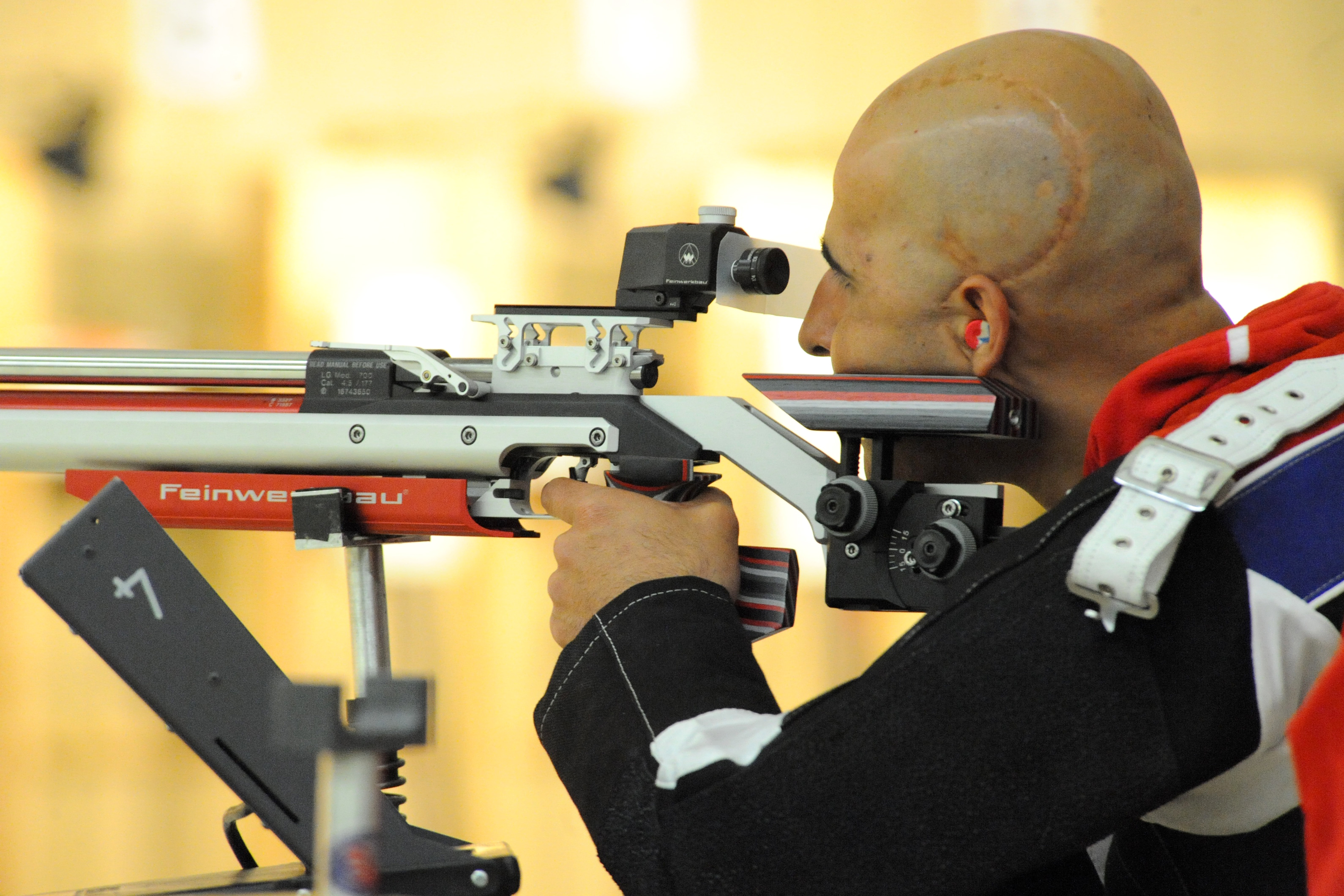

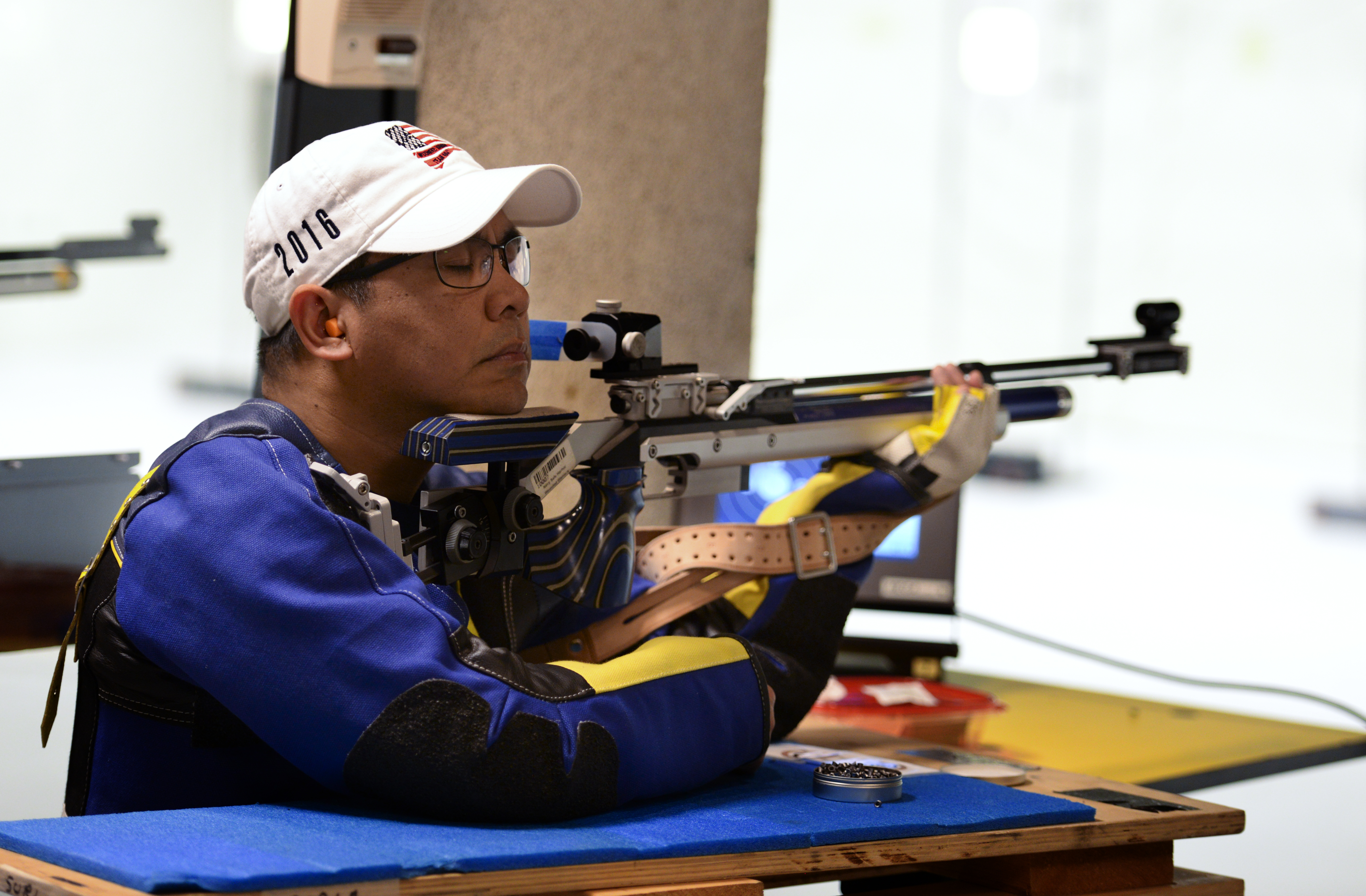

== Pistol events ==
The Minimum Qualification Scores (MQS) for Regional and World Championships (MQS, 2012 LON Paralympic Games).

SH1 Class

Event	Discipline	Gender	
P1	10m Air Pistol	Men	535
P2	10m Air Pistol	Women	340
P3	25m Pistol	Mixed	530
P4	50m Pistol	Mixed	490
P5	10m Air Pistol Standard	Mixed	310

== Competitions ==
"Co-ed" or "Mixed" male and female shooters compete together in certain events. Shooting is conducted in 2 stages: Qualification and Finals. In the 2013-2016 ISSF Rules, Air Rifle Prone (R3) and .22 Rifle Prone (R6) competitors for example, have unlimited sighters 15 minutes before the 60 competition shots due within 50 minutes. The new Finals are also conducted with the top 8 shooters starting from zero, with a focus on the decimal duel to clearly determine medal winners.

Minimum Qualification Scores (MQS) prescribed by the Paralympic Games host country are participation criteria required for IPC recognized shooting competitions such as Regional and World Championships. Competitions are conducted under IPC Shooting/ISSF Rules and Regulations and IPC Shooting Classification Rules and Regulations.

The IPC World Cups held mostly in Europe and North America are well attended Paralympic Games qualifiers. The ASIAN Para Games, formerly known as the FESPIC Games and the Jikji Cup Asian Open Championships in Korea are the main Paralympic shooting events in Asia.

== ISSF's 2013–2016 rule changes ==
With the LON 2012 Paralympics over, ISSF introduced new rules for 2013-2016 to make winners easier to identify as many shooters were easily achieving the maximum scores.

"It is officially confirmed that IPC Shooting will be adhering to all the changes made in the 2013 edition of the ISSF rules, including finals format changes and the trial of decimal scoring. This decision was made in line with the Memorandum of Understanding (signed 2010) between the ISSF and IPC Shooting, and after serious consideration regarding the future development of our sport. The decision has been approved by the IPC Governing Board, as is the formality. The 2013 ISSF Rules include some significant changes that IPC Shooting believes will have an exciting impact for IPC Shooting competitions."

In January 2013, the new ISSF rules came into effect, initially with the more obvious changes:

- Shortened competition times - Shooting events now having the same shortened times for both ISSF and IPC Shooting competitors.
- New finals format - The top eight shooters start from zero, through a 20-shot sequence with low scorers eliminated every few shots until the top two shooters duel it out, the highest decimal scorer taking the Gold. The new finals format hopes to "engage a worldwide public by attracting spectators and fans through an appealing and easily understandable competition format".
- Clothing changes - IPC shooters not required to wear shooting trousers if seated, trimmed shooting boots for standing competitors, etc.

Shooting teams around the globe now focus on decimal scoring trials in the qualification, not just the finals stage. Likewise, the Safety Flag RULE 6.2.2.2., with a small ISSF flag on one end of a visible nylon line (such as from the whipper-snipper garden tool), inserted full length and out the other end of both rifles and pistols to visibly show that the firearms is unloaded and 'safe', are additional required safety equipment seeing action at the finals, as well as firearm control and while on standby at the firing point.

== See also ==
- Shooting at the Summer Paralympics
- Shooting Para sport classification
