= Shooting at the 2020 Summer Paralympics – Qualification =

Qualification for shooting at the 2020 Summer Paralympics begins from 1 January 2019 to 21 June 2021. There were three events for male and female sports shooters and seven mixed events. There were a total of 154 athlete quotas (65 male, 54 female, 35 gender free).

== Timeline ==
Detailed direct allocation slots are listed in the qualification slots section.

| Events | Date | Venue | Berths |
|---|---|---|---|
| 2018 WSPS World Championships | 1–12 May 2018 | (South Korea) Cheongju | 43 |
| 2018 WSPS World Cup | 22–30 September 2018 | (France) Châteauroux | 13 |
| 2019 WSPS World Cup | 16–24 February 2019 | (United Arab Emirates) Al Ain | 17 |
| 2019 WSPS World Championships | 12–18 October 2019 | (Australia) Sydney | 53 |
| 2021 WSPS World Cup | 11 –21 May 2021 | (Peru) Lima | 18 |
| Host county allocation | — | — | 2 |
| Bipartite Commission Invitation | 1 July 2021 | — | 4 |
| Total | | | 154 |

== Qualification requirements ==
=== Eligibility scores ===
Each athlete from each NPC must at least aim to score targets in each medalling event in the qualifying tournaments.

| Event | | Score |
|---|---|---|
| Rifle | R1 - Men's 10m air rifle standing SH1 | 600.0 |
| Rifle | R2 - Women's 10m air rifle standing SH1 | 595.0 |
| Rifle | R3 - Mixed 10m air rifle prone SH1 | 623.0 |
| Rifle | R4 - Mixed 10m air rifle standing SH2 | 620.0 |
| Rifle | R5 - Mixed 10m air rifle prone SH2 | 628.0 |
| Rifle | R6 - Mixed 50m rifle prone SH1 | 605.0 |
| Rifle | R7 - Men's 50m rifle 3 positions SH1 | 1110 |
| Rifle | R8 - Women's 50m rifle 3 positions SH1 | 1050 |
| Rifle | R9 - Mixed 50m rifle prone SH2 | 605.0 |
| Pistol | P1 - Men's 10m air pistol SH1 | 547 |
| Pistol | P2 - Women's 10m air pistol SH1 | 510 |
| Pistol | P3 - Mixed 25m sport pistol SH1 | 540 |
| Pistol | P4 - Mixed 50m pistol SH1 | 510 |

== Summary ==
| Nation | Men | | | Women | | | Mixed | | | | | | | Quotas | Athletes |
| Nation | R1 | R7 | P1 | R2 | R8 | P2 | R3 | R4 | R5 | R6 | R9 | P3 | P4 | Quotas | Athletes |
|---|---|---|---|---|---|---|---|---|---|---|---|---|---|---|---|
| Australia (AUS) | | | | 1 | | | 1 | | | | | 1 | | 3 | 3 |
| Azerbaijan (AZE) | | | | | | | | | | | | | 1 | 1 | 1 |
| Bosnia and Herzegovina (BIH) | | | | | | | | | 1 | | | | 1 | 2 | 2 |
| Brazil (BRA) | | | | | | | | | 1 | | | | | 1 | 1 |
| Bulgaria (BUL) | | | | | | | | | 1 | | | | | 1 | 1 |
| Canada (CAN) | | | | | | | | 1 | 1 | | | | | 2 | 2 |
| China (CHN) | 1 | 2 | 2 | 1 | 1 | | 1 | 1 | | | | 1 | | 10 | 10 |
| Croatia (CRO) | | | 1 | | | | | | | | | | | 1 | 1 |
| Cuba (CUB) | | | | | | 1 | | | | | | | | 1 | 1 |
| Czech Republic (CZE) | | | | | | | | | | | | | 1 | 1 | 1 |
| Finland (FIN) | | | | | | | 1 | | | | | | | 1 | 1 |
| France (FRA) | | 1 | | | | | 1 | 1 | 2 | 1 | 1 | 1 | | 8 | 8 |
| Georgia (GEO) | | | | | | | | | | | 1 | | | 1 | 1 |
| Germany (GER) | | | 1 | | 2 | | 1 | | | | 1 | | | 5 | 5 |
| Great Britain (GBR) | | | | | 2 | 1 | | 1 | | 1 | 2 | | | 7 | 7 |
| Greece (GRE) | | | | | | | 1 | | | | | | | 1 | 1 |
| Hungary (HUN) | | | | | | 1 | | | | | | | 1 | 2 | 2 |
| India (IND) | 1 | 1 | 2 | | | 1 | | | | 2 | | 1 | 1 | 9 | 9 |
| Indonesia (INA) | | | | 1 | | | | | 1 | | | | | 2 | 2 |
| Iran (IRI) | | | 1 | 1 | | 1 | | | | | | | 2 | 5 | 5 |
| Ireland (IRL) | | | | | | | | | | | 1 | | | 1 | 1 |
| Israel (ISR) | | 1 | | | | | | | | 1 | | | | 2 | 2 |
| Italy (ITA) | 1 | | | | | 1 | | 1 | | | 1 | | | 4 | 4 |
| Kazakhstan (KAZ) | | | | | | 1 | | | | | | | | 1 | 1 |
| North Macedonia (MKD) | | | | | | | | | | | | 1 | | 1 | 1 |
| Mongolia (MGL) | | | | | | | | | | | | | 1 | 1 | 1 |
| New Zealand (NZL) | | | | | | | | 1 | | | | | | 1 | 1 |
| Norway (NOR) | | | | 1 | 1 | | | 1 | | 1 | | | | 4 | 4 |
| Poland (POL) | | | 1 | | | | 1 | | | | | 1 | | 3 | 3 |
| RPC (RUS) | | 1 | 1 | | 1 | 1 | 1 | | 1 | | 1 | | | 7 | 7 |
| Serbia (SRB) | 1 | | | | | | | 1 | 2 | | | 1 | 1 | 6 | 6 |
| Slovakia (SVK) | 1 | | | 1 | | | | | | | 1 | | | 3 | 3 |
| Slovenia (SLO) | 1 | | | | | | | 1 | | | | | | 2 | 2 |
| South Korea (KOR) | 2 | 1 | | | 2 | | 2 | 1 | | 1 | | 2 | 1 | 12 | 12 |
| Spain (ESP) | | | | | | | | | | 1 | | | | 1 | 1 |
| Sweden (SWE) | 1 | | | | | 1 | | 1 | | 1 | | | 1 | 5 | 5 |
| Switzerland (SUI) | | | | | | | | 1 | | | | | | 1 | 1 |
| Thailand (THA) | 1 | | | 1 | | | | | | 1 | | | | 3 | 3 |
| Turkey (TUR) | | | 1 | 1 | | 2 | 2 | | 1 | | | 1 | | 9 | 9 |
| Ukraine (UKR) | 1 | 1 | | 1 | | 1 | | | 1 | | 1 | 1 | | 7 | 7 |
| United Arab Emirates (UAE) | | | | | | | | 1 | | 3 | | | | 4 | 4 |
| United States (USA) | | | | | | | 1 | 1 | 2 | 1 | | 1 | | 6 | 6 |
| Uzbekistan (UZB) | | | 1 | | | | | | | | | | | 1 | 1 |
| 39 NPCs | | | | | | | | | | | | | | 140 | 140 |

== Qualification slots ==
An NPC can:

- Enter a maximum of three eligible athletes per medaling event.
- Allocate a maximum of twelve qualification slots, maximum of eight of any gender.
- Qualification slots are allocated to the NPCs, not to the individual athlete however in Bipartite Commission Invitation, the slot is allocated to the individual athlete not to the NPC.

=== Pistol ===
As of June 2021.

P1 - Men's 10m Air Pistol SH1

| Competition | Berths | Nation | Qualified athlete |
|---|---|---|---|
| 2018 World Championships | 3 | China (CHN) | Yang Chao |
| 2018 World Championships | 3 | Uzbekistan (UZB) | Server Ibragimov |
| 2018 World Championships | 3 | China (CHN) | Lou Xiaolong |
| 2018 World Cup | 2 | India (IND) | Manish Narwal |
| 2018 World Cup | 2 | India (IND) | Deepender Singh |
| 2019 World Cup | 1 | Iran (IRI) | Seyedmohammadreza Mirshafiei |
| 2019 World Championships | 3 | RPC (RUS) | Sergey Malyshev |
| 2019 World Championships | 3 | Czech Republic (CZE) | Jakub Kosek |
| 2019 World Championships | 3 | Poland (POL) | Filip Rodzik |
| 2021 World Cup | 1 | Germany (GER) | Tobias Meyer |
| Bipartite Slot Allocation | 1 | Croatia (CRO) | Damir Bosnjak |

P2 - Women's 10m Air Pistol SH1

| Competition | Berths | Nation | Qualified athlete |
|---|---|---|---|
| 2018 World Championships | 2 | Iran (IRI) | Sareh Javanmardi |
| 2018 World Championships | 2 | Ukraine (UKR) | Iryna Liakhu |
| 2018 World Cup | 1 | Italy (ITA) | Nadia Fario |
| 2019 World Cup | 2 | Hungary (HUN) | Krisztina David |
| 2019 World Cup | 2 | Turkey (TUR) | Ayşegül Pehlivanlar |
| 2019 World Championships | 2 | Sweden (SWE) | Bang Yu-Jeong |
| 2019 World Championships | 2 | Great Britain (GBR) | Issy Bailey |
| 2021 World Cup | 1 | India (IND) | Rubina Francis |
| Bipartite Slot Allocation | 4 | Cuba (CUB) | Yenigladys Suarez Echevarria |
| Bipartite Slot Allocation | 4 | Kazakhstan (KAZ) | Aisulu Jumabayeva |
| Bipartite Slot Allocation | 4 | RPC (RUS) | Oksana Berezovskaia |
| Bipartite Slot Allocation | 4 | Turkey (TUR) | Aysel Ozgan |

P3 - Mixed 25m Pistol SH1

| Competition | Berths | Nation | Qualified athlete |
|---|---|---|---|
| 2018 World Championships | 4 | China (CHN) | Huang Xing |
| 2018 World Championships | 4 | South Korea (KOR) | Park Chul |
| 2018 World Championships | 4 | North Macedonia (MKD) | Olivera Nakovska-Bikova |
| 2018 World Championships | 4 | Ukraine (UKR) | Oleksii Denysiuk |
| 2018 World Cup | 1 | Poland (POL) | Szymon Sowinski |
| 2019 World Cup | 1 | Turkey (TUR) | Murat Oguz |
| 2019 World Championships | 4 | Serbia (SRB) | Zivko Papaz |
| 2019 World Championships | 4 | Turkey (TUR) | Korhan Yamac |
| 2019 World Championships | 4 | United States (USA) | Gong Xiao |
| 2019 World Championships | 4 | Azerbaijan (AZE) | Yelena Taranova |
| 2021 World Cup | 3 | India (IND) | Rahul Jakhar |
| 2021 World Cup | 3 | South Korea (KOR) | Kim Younmi |
| 2021 World Cup | 3 | France (FRA) | David Auclair |
| Bipartite Slot Allocation | 1 | Australia (AUS) | Christopher Pitt |

P4 - Mixed 50m Pistol SH1

| Competition | Berths | Nation | Qualified athlete |
|---|---|---|---|
| 2018 World Championships | 4 | Sweden (SWE) | Joackim Norberg |
| 2018 World Championships | 4 | Iran (IRI) | Mahdi Zamanishurabi |
| 2018 World Championships | 4 | Iran (IRI) | Samira Eram |
| 2018 World Championships | 4 | South Korea (KOR) | Moon Aeekyung |
| 2018 World Cup | 2 | India (IND) | Singhraj |
| 2018 World Cup | 2 | Czech Republic (CZE) | Tomas Pesek |
| 2019 World Cup | 1 | Mongolia (MGL) | Ganbaatar Zandraa |
| 2019 World Championships | 4 | Serbia (SRB) | Rastko Jokić |
| 2019 World Championships | 4 | Azerbaijan (AZE) | Kamran Zeynalov |
| 2019 World Championships | 4 | Bosnia and Herzegovina (BIH) | Ervin Bejdic |
| 2019 World Championships | 4 | China (CHN) | Li Min |
| 2021 World Cup | 1 | India (IND) | Akash |
| Bipartite Slot Allocation | 1 | Hungary (HUN) | Gyula Gurisatti |

=== Rifle ===
R1 - Men's 10m Air Rifle Standing SH1

| Competition | Berths | Nation | Qualified athlete |
|---|---|---|---|
| 2018 World Championships | 4 | South Korea (KOR) | Park Jinho |
| 2018 World Championships | 4 | Slovakia (SVK) | Radoslav Malenovsky |
| 2018 World Championships | 4 | Ukraine (UKR) | Andrii Doroshenko |
| 2018 World Championships | 4 | Serbia (SRB) | Laslo Suranji |
| 2018 World Cup | 1 | South Korea (KOR) | Lee Seungchul |
| 2019 World Cup | 1 | China (CHN) | Tian Fugang |
| 2019 World Championships | 4 | Slovenia (SLO) | Franc Pinter |
| 2019 World Championships | 4 | Sweden (SWE) | Håkan Gustafsson |
| 2019 World Championships | 4 | Thailand (THA) | Wiraphon Mansing |
| 2019 World Championships | 4 | India (IND) | Swaroop Mahavir Unhalkar |
| 2021 World Cup | 1 | Italy (ITA) | Jacopo Cappelli |

R2 - Women's 10m Air Rifle Standing SH1

| Competition | Berths | Nation | Qualified athlete |
|---|---|---|---|
| 2018 World Championships | 3 | Slovakia (SVK) | Veronika Vadovičová |
| 2018 World Championships | 3 | China (CHN) | Bai Xiaohong |
| 2018 World Championships | 3 | Ukraine (UKR) | Iryna Shchetnik |
| 2018 World Cup | 1 | Australia (AUS) | Natalie Smith |
| 2019 World Cup | 1 | Turkey (TUR) | Cagla Bas |
| 2019 World Championships | 3 | Iran (IRI) | Roghayeh Shojaei |
| 2019 World Championships | 3 | Indonesia (INA) | Hanik Puji Hastuti |
| 2019 World Championships | 3 | Thailand (THA) | Wannipa Leungvilai |
| 2021 World Cup | 1 | Turkey (TUR) | Suzan Çevik |

R3 - Mixed 10m Air Rifle Prone SH1

| Competition | Berths | Nation | Qualified athlete |
|---|---|---|---|
| 2018 World Championships | 4 | South Korea (KOR) | Sim Jae Yong |
| 2018 World Championships | 4 | Australia (AUS) | Anton Zappelli |
| 2018 World Championships | 4 | China (CHN) | Zhang Cuiping |
| 2018 World Championships | 4 | South Korea (KOR) | Lee Jangho |
| 2018 World Cup | 1 | Finland (FIN) | Jarkko Mylly |
| 2019 World Cup | 1 | Germany (GER) | Bernhard Fendt |
| 2019 World Championships | 7 | RPC (RUS) | Sergei Nochevnoi |
| 2019 World Championships | 7 | Turkey (TUR) | Savas Ustun |
| 2019 World Championships | 7 | France (FRA) | Christophe Tanche |
| 2019 World Championships | 7 | Greece (GRE) | Sotirios Galogavros |
| 2019 World Championships | 7 | RPC (RUS) | Tatiana Ryabchenko |
| 2019 World Championships | 7 | United States (USA) | Taylor Farmer |
| 2019 World Championships | 7 | Poland (POL) | Emilia Babska |
| 2021 World Cup | 1 | Turkey (TUR) | Erhan Coskuner |

R4 - Mixed 10m Air Rifle Standing SH2

| Competition | Berths | Nation | Qualified athlete |
|---|---|---|---|
| 2018 World Championships | 3 | South Korea (KOR) | Lee Jiseok |
| 2018 World Championships | 3 | Switzerland (SUI) | Nicole Häusler |
| 2018 World Championships | 3 | New Zealand (NZL) | Michael Johnson |
| 2018 World Cup | 1 | Italy (ITA) | Andrea Liverani |
| 2019 World Cup | 2 | Great Britain (GBR) | Ryan Cockbill |
| 2019 World Cup | 2 | Sweden (SWE) | Philip Jonsson |
| 2019 World Championships | 5 | Slovenia (SLO) | Franček Gorazd Tiršek |
| 2019 World Championships | 5 | Norway (NOR) | Sonja Jennie Tobiassen |
| 2019 World Championships | 5 | China (CHN) | Yuan Hongxiang |
| 2019 World Championships | 5 | United States (USA) | McKenna Dahl |
| 2019 World Championships | 5 | Serbia (SRB) | Dejan Jokić |
| 2021 World Cup | 2 | France (FRA) | Kevin Liot |
| 2021 World Cup | 2 | United Arab Emirates (UAE) | Ayesha Almehairi |
| Bipartite Slot Allocation | 1 | Canada (CAN) | Lyne Tremblay |

R5 - Mixed 10m Air Rifle Prone SH2

| Competition | Berths | Nation | Qualified athlete |
|---|---|---|---|
| 2018 World Championships | 4 | Ukraine (UKR) | Vitali Plakushchyi |
| 2018 World Championships | 4 | Serbia (SRB) | Dragan Ristic |
| 2018 World Championships | 4 | Bulgaria (BUL) | Milena Todorova |
| 2018 World Championships | 4 | Turkey (TUR) | Hakan Cevik |
| 2018 World Cup | 2 | France (FRA) | Alain Quittet |
| 2018 World Cup | 2 | France (FRA) | Tanguy de la Forest |
| 2019 World Cup | 1 | Brazil (BRA) | Alexandre Galgani |
| 2019 World Championships | 5 | Japan (JPN) | Mika Mizuta |
| 2019 World Championships | 5 | Indonesia (INA) | Bolo Triyanto |
| 2019 World Championships | 5 | RPC (RUS) | Nikolai Krygin |
| 2019 World Championships | 5 | Serbia (SRB) | Zdravko Savanovic |
| 2019 World Championships | 5 | Bosnia and Herzegovina (BIH) | Zerina Skomorac |
| 2021 World Cup | 3 | Germany (GER) | Moritz Alexander Moebius |
| 2021 World Cup | 3 | United States (USA) | Jazmin Almlie |
| 2021 World Cup | 3 | Thailand (THA) | Anuson Chaichamnan |
| Bipartite Slot Allocation | 2 | Canada (CAN) | Doug Blessin |
| Bipartite Slot Allocation | 2 | United States (USA) | Stetson Bardfield |

R6 - Mixed 50m Rifle Prone SH1

| Competition | Berths | Nation | Qualified athlete |
|---|---|---|---|
| 2018 World Championships | 4 | United Arab Emirates (UAE) | Abdullah Sultan Alaryani |
| 2018 World Championships | 4 | South Korea (KOR) | Ju Sungchul |
| 2018 World Championships | 4 | Sweden (SWE) | Anna Normann |
| 2018 World Championships | 4 | Great Britain (GBR) | Matt Skelhon |
| 2018 World Cup | 2 | Spain (ESP) | Juan Antonio Saavedra Reinaldo |
| 2018 World Cup | 2 | United States (USA) | John Joss III |
| 2019 World Cup | 2 | India (IND) | Avani Lekhara |
| 2019 World Cup | 2 | United Arab Emirates (UAE) | Saif Alnuaimi |
| 2019 World Championships | 5 | India (IND) | Sidhartha Babu |
| 2019 World Championships | 5 | Norway (NOR) | Paul Aksel Johansen |
| 2019 World Championships | 5 | Israel (ISR) | Yuliya Chernoy |
| 2019 World Championships | 5 | France (FRA) | Cedric Fevre |
| 2019 World Championships | 5 | United Arab Emirates (UAE) | Abdulla Saif Alaryani |
| 2021 World Cup | 1 | United States (USA) | Kevin Nguyen |
| Bipartite Slot Allocation | 1 | Thailand (THA) | Chutima Saenlar |

R7 - Men's 50m Rifle 3 Positions

| Competition | Berths | Nation | Qualified athlete |
|---|---|---|---|
| 2018 World Championships | 3 | China (CHN) | Gou Dingchao |
| 2018 World Championships | 3 | Ukraine (UKR) | Yurii Stoiev |
| 2018 World Championships | 3 | South Korea (KOR) | Shim Youngjip |
| 2018 World Cup | 1 | Israel (ISR) | Doron Shaziri |
| 2019 World Cup | 1 | China (CHN) | Dong Chao |
| 2019 World Championships | 3 | RPC (RUS) | Andrey Kozhemyakin |
| 2019 World Championships | 3 | Thailand (THA) | Atidet Intanon |
| 2019 World Championships | 3 | France (FRA) | Didier Richard |
| 2021 World Cup | 1 | India (IND) | Deepak Saini |

R8 - Women's 50m Rifle 3 Positions

| Competition | Berths | Nation | Qualified athlete |
|---|---|---|---|
| 2018 World Championships | 2 | Germany (GER) | Natascha Hiltrop |
| 2018 World Championships | 2 | South Korea (KOR) | Lee Yunri |
| 2018 World Cup | 1 | Germany (GER) | Elke Seeliger |
| 2019 World Cup | 1 | China (CHN) | Yan Yaping |
| 2019 World Championships | 3 | South Korea (KOR) | Kang Myungsoon |
| 2019 World Championships | 3 | Great Britain (GBR) | Lorraine Lambert |
| 2019 World Championships | 3 | Norway (NOR) | Monica Lillehagen |
| 2021 World Cup | 1 | Great Britain (GBR) | Lesley Stewart |

R9 - Mixed 50m Rifle Prone SH2

| Competition | Berths | Nation | Qualified athlete |
|---|---|---|---|
| 2018 World Championships | 3 | Ukraine (UKR) | Vasyl Kovalchuk |
| 2018 World Championships | 3 | Slovakia (SVK) | Kristina Funkova |
| 2018 World Championships | 3 | Italy (ITA) | Pamela Novaglio |
| 2018 World Cup | 1 | Great Britain (GBR) | James Bevis |
| 2019 World Cup | 1 | Great Britain (GBR) | Tim Jeffery |
| 2019 World Championships | 4 | Ireland (IRL) | Phil Eaglesham |
| 2019 World Championships | 4 | Germany (GER) | Tim Focken |
| 2019 World Championships | 4 | RPC (RUS) | Antonina Zhukova |
| 2019 World Championships | 4 | Norway (NOR) | Heidi Kristin Soerlie-Rogne |
| 2021 World Cup | 1 | France (FRA) | Vincent Fagnon |
| Bipartite Slot Allocation | 1 | Georgia (GEO) | Vladimer Tchintcharauli |

== See also ==
- Shooting at the 2020 Summer Olympics – Qualification
