= Shooting at the 2020 Summer Paralympics – P1 Men's 10 metre air pistol SH1 =

P1 Men's 10 metre air rifle standing SH1 at the XVI Paralympic Games
- Venue: Asaka Shooting Range
- Dates: 31 August 2021
- Competitors: 27 from 19 nations

Medalists
| 1st place, gold medalist(s) | | Yang Chao | China |
| 2nd place, silver medalist(s) | | Huang Xing | China |
| 3rd place, bronze medalist(s) | | Singhraj Adhana | India |

The Men's P1 10 metre air pistol SH1 event at the 2020 Summer Paralympics took place on 31 August at the Asaka Shooting Range in Tokyo.

The event consisted of two rounds: a qualifier and a final.

The top 8 shooters in the qualifying round moved on to the final round.

== Records ==
Prior to this competition, the existing world and Paralympic records were as follows.

Qualification records
| World Record | Lou Xiaolong (CHN) | 581.0 | Al Ain, United Arab Emirates | 23 March 2018 |
| Paralympic Record | Valeriy Ponomarenko (RUS) | 578.0 | Beijing, China | 7 September 2008 |

Final records
| World Record | Rahul Jakhar (IND) | 240.1 | Osijek, Croatia | 28 July 2019 |
| Paralympic Record | Not established | – | – | – |

== Schedule ==
All times are Japan Standard Time (UTC+9)

| Date | Time | Round |
|---|---|---|
| Tuesday, 31 August 2021 | 12:00 | Qualification |
| Tuesday, 31 August 2021 | 14:30 | Final |

== Qualification ==
| Rank | Shooter | Nation | 1 | 2 | 3 | 4 | 5 | 6 | Total | Inner 10s | Notes |
|---|---|---|---|---|---|---|---|---|---|---|---|
| 1 | Manish Narwal | India | 96 | 95 | 92 | 98 | 97 | 97 | 575 | 21 | Q |
| 2 | Lou Xiaolong | China | 96 | 97 | 94 | 96 | 96 | 96 | 575 | 15 | Q |
| 3 | Huang Xing | China | 94 | 95 | 94 | 97 | 96 | 98 | 574 | 22 | Q |
| 4 | Server Ibragimov | Uzbekistan | 94 | 94 | 96 | 97 | 97 | 96 | 574 | 20 | Q |
| 5 | Yang Chao | China | 97 | 97 | 96 | 94 | 96 | 92 | 572 | 15 | Q |
| 6 | Singhraj Adhana | India | 95 | 97 | 93 | 95 | 92 | 97 | 569 | 18 | Q |
| 7 | Szymon Sowiński | Poland | 95 | 96 | 93 | 97 | 94 | 91 | 566 | 12 | Q |
| 8 | Sergey Malyshev | RPC | 95 | 93 | 91 | 97 | 94 | 91 | 566 | 12 | Q |
| 9 | Gong Xiao | United States | 93 | 91 | 94 | 94 | 95 | 96 | 563 | 17 | |
| 10 | Deepender Singh | India | 96 | 93 | 96 | 88 | 92 | 95 | 560 | 9 | |
| 11 | Tomáš Pešek | Czech Republic | 94 | 91 | 95 | 95 | 93 | 91 | 559 | 10 | |
| 12 | Živko Papaz | Serbia | 91 | 90 | 94 | 92 | 94 | 96 | 557 | 12 | |
| 13 | Seo Young-kyun | South Korea | 95 | 94 | 90 | 93 | 93 | 92 | 557 | 11 | |
| 14 | Oleksii Denysiuk | Ukraine | 96 | 91 | 90 | 94 | 93 | 93 | 557 | 9 | |
| 15 | Tobias Meyer | Germany | 95 | 92 | 93 | 93 | 91 | 92 | 556 | 10 | |
| 16 | Zandraagiin Ganbaatar | Mongolia | 91 | 89 | 92 | 95 | 97 | 92 | 556 | 9 | |
| 17 | Filip Rodzik | Poland | 93 | 94 | 91 | 92 | 93 | 92 | 555 | 10 | |
| 18 | Murat Oğuz | Turkey | 93 | 91 | 92 | 88 | 98 | 92 | 554 | 8 | |
| 19 | Joackim Norberg | Sweden | 93 | 91 | 91 | 93 | 92 | 91 | 551 | 9 | |
| 20 | Muharrem Korhan Yamaç | Turkey | 91 | 91 | 92 | 94 | 90 | 92 | 550 | 11 | |
| 21 | Rastko Jokić | Serbia | 92 | 91 | 91 | 94 | 91 | 89 | 548 | 6 | |
| 22 | Damir Bošnjak | Croatia | 92 | 86 | 90 | 98 | 87 | 91 | 544 | 6 | |
| 23 | Kamran Zeynalov | Azerbaijan | 95 | 94 | 93 | 87 | 86 | 88 | 543 | 8 | |
| 24 | Gyula Gurisatti | Hungary | 91 | 91 | 92 | 88 | 92 | 88 | 542 | 8 | |
| 25 | Christopher Pitt | Australia | 93 | 87 | 90 | 92 | 89 | 91 | 542 | 3 | |
| 26 | Ervin Bejdić | Bosnia and Herzegovina | 90 | 94 | 87 | 92 | 89 | 87 | 539 | 10 | |
| 27 | Jakub Kosek | Czech Republic | 89 | 89 | 85 | 90 | 93 | 87 | 533 | 6 | |

== Final ==
| Rank | Shooter | Nation | 1 | 2 | 3 | 4 | 5 | 6 | 7 | 8 | 9 | Total | Notes |
|---|---|---|---|---|---|---|---|---|---|---|---|---|---|
| 1st place, gold medalist(s) | Yang Chao | China | 50.5 | 100.3 | 120.6 | 140.9 | 162.0 | 181.6 | 199.3 | 217.5 | 237.9 | 237.9 | PR |
| 2nd place, silver medalist(s) | Huang Xing | China | 48.7 | 99.0 | 118.5 | 139.4 | 158.3 | 179.3 | 197.8 | 218.7 | 237.5 | 237.5 | |
| 3rd place, bronze medalist(s) | Singhraj Adhana | India | 50.3 | 99.6 | 119.6 | 138.7 | 157.8 | 178.1 | 196.8 | 216.8 | — | 216.8 | |
| 4 | Lou Xiaolong | China | 50.1 | 98.3 | 118.0 | 137.5 | 158.2 | 177.5 | 196.5 | — | | 198.9 | |
| 5 | Server Ibragimov | Uzbekistan | 49.2 | 97.8 | 118.5 | 138.5 | 157.7 | 177.4 | — | | | 177.4 | |
| 6 | Szymon Sowiński | Poland | 48.9 | 96.2 | 116.9 | 136.4 | 156.4 | — | | | | 156.4 | |
| 7 | Manish Narwal | India | 47.6 | 97.2 | 116.0 | 135.8 | — | | | | | 137.4 | |
| 8 | Sergey Malyshev | RPC | 46.6 | 94.7 | 113.3 | — | | | | | | 113.3 | |
