= 2021 in shooting =

This article lists the main target shooting events and their results for 2021.

== World Events ==
=== Olympic & Paralympic Games ===
The 2020 Olympic Games & 2020 Paralympic Games were held in Tokyo, following their postponement in 2020.

- Shooting at the 2020 Summer Olympics – Qualification
- Shooting at the 2020 Summer Olympics
- Shooting at the 2020 Summer Paralympics – Qualification
- Shooting at the 2020 Summer Paralympics

=== International Shooting Sport Federation ===
- September 27 - October 10: 2021 ISSF Junior World Championships held in Lima, Peru

==== ISSF World Cup ====
- 2021 ISSF World Cup

=== International Practical Shooting Confederation ===
- 2021 IPSC Action Air World Shoot was delayed until 2022, when it should have been held in Sochi, Russia. Was cancelled following Russian invasion of Ukraine.

=== FITASC ===
2021 Results

== Regional Events ==
=== Americas ===
==== Junior Pan American Games ====
- November 26–28: Shooting at the 2021 Junior Pan American Games in Cali, Colombia

=== Asia ===
==== Asian Shooting Championships ====
- September 12–19: 2021 Asian Airgun Championships in Shymkent, Kazakhstan

=== Europe ===
==== European Shooting Confederation ====
- May 22 – June 5: 2021 European Shooting Championships in Osijek, Croatia

==== "B Matches" ====
- December 8–11: RIAC returned after 2020 cancellation in Strassen, Luxembourg.

== National Events ==
=== United Kingdom ===
==== NRA Imperial Meeting ====
- July, held at the National Shooting Centre, Bisley
  - Queen's Prize winner: RSF Shouler (GBR)
  - Grand Aggregate winner: Parag Patel (GBR)
  - Kolapore Winners: Great Britain (GBR)
  - National Trophy Winners: Wales (WAL)
  - Elcho Shield winners: England (ENG)
  - Vizianagram winners: House of Commons

=== USA ===
- 2021 NCAA Rifle Championships, won by Kentucky Wildcats
