= 2022 World Shooting Para Sport Championships =

- Venue: Al Ain Equestrian, Shooting & Golf Club
- Location: Al Ain, United Arab Emirates
- Dates: 6–17 November 2022
- Competitors: 271 from 54 nations

The 2022 World Shooting Para Sport Championships was the 8th edition of the World Shooting Para Sport Championships. It was held in Al Ain, United Arab Emirates from 6 to 17 November 2022. It was the first time the competition was staged in the Middle East.

World Shooting Para Sport has proposed that 31 athletes was eligible to participate in the 2024 Summer Paralympics based on their performance at Al Ain 2022 – increasing the overall importance of this tournament.

== Medal summary ==
Event	Gold	Silver	Bronze
P1 – Men's 10m Air Pistol SH1	Jo Jeong-du (KOR)	Szymon Sowiński (POL)	Server Ibragimov (UZB)
P2 – Women's 10m Air Pistol SH1	Ayşe Özkan (TUR)	Nasrin Shahi Samakhoun (IRI)	Krisztina Dávid (HUN)
P3 – Mixed 25m Pistol SH1	Kim Jung-nam (KOR)	Oleksii Denysiuk (UKR)	Rahul Jakhar (IND)
P4 – Mixed 50m Pistol SH1	Olivera Nakovska-Bikova (MKD)	Oleksii Denysiuk (UKR)	Cevat Karagöl (TUR)
P5 – Mixed 10m Air Pistol Standard SH1	Szymon Sowiński (POL)	Park Sea-kyun (KOR)	Oleksii Denysiuk (UKR)
P6 – 10m Air Pistol Standing Mixed Team SH1	Turkey; Ayşegül Pehlivanlar; Cevat Karagöl	Turkey; Aysel Özgan; Taha Yasin Küsmüş	South Korea; Park Sea-kyun; Moon Aee-kyung
R1 – Men's 10m Air Rifle Standing SH1	Lee Jang-ho (KOR)	Didier Richard (FRA)	Park Jin-ho (KOR)
R2 – Women's 10m Air Rifle Standing SH1	Veronika Vadovičová (SVK)	Iryna Shchetnik (UKR)	Lee Yun-ri (KOR)
R3 – Mixed 10m Air Rifle Prone SH1	Veronika Vadovičová (SVK)	Natascha Hiltrop (GER)	Yuliya Chernoy (ISR)
R4 – Mixed 10m Air Rifle Standing SH2	Tanguy de La Forest (FRA)	Seo Hun-tae (KOR)	Ryan Cockbill (GBR)
R5 – Mixed 10m Air Rifle Prone SH2	Vasyl Kovalchuk (UKR)	Bolo Triyanto (INA)	Franček Gorazd Tiršek (SLO)
R6 – Mixed 50m Rifle Prone SH1	Abdullah Sultan Alaryani (UAE)	Kasper Hjorth Lousdal (DEN)	Natascha Hiltrop (GER)
R7 – Men's 50m Rifle 3 Positions SH1	Abdullah Sultan Alaryani (UAE)	Radoslav Malenovský (SVK)	Lee Jang-ho (KOR)
R8 – Women's 50m Rifle 3 Positions SH1	Emilia Babska (POL)	Iryna Shchetnik (UKR)	Veronika Vadovičová (SVK)
R9 – Mixed 50m Rifle Prone SH2	Tanguy de La Forest (FRA)	Livia Cecagallina (ITA)	Vitalii Plakushchyi (UKR)
R10 – 10m Air Rifle Standing Mixed Team SH1	Ukraine; Iryna Shchetnik; Andrii Doroshenko	South Korea; Lee Yun-ri; Shim Young-jip	South Korea; Park Jin-ho; Lee Yoo-jeong
R11 – 10m Air Rifle Standing Mixed Team SH2	Ukraine; Anastasiia Telizhenko; Vasyl Kovalchuk	United Arab Emirates; Ayesha Al-Mehairi; Saeed Al-Blooshi	Italy; Livia Cecagallina; Roberto Lazzaro
VIP – 10m Air Rifle VI Prone	Ager Solabarrieta (ESP)	Grzegorz Kłos (POL)	Fran Skračić (CRO)
VIS – 10m Air Rifle VI Standing	Barbara Moskal (POL)	Katarzyna Orzechowska (POL)	Martin Adámek (CZE)
PT1 – Mixed Trap Seated SG-S	Oreste Lai (ITA)	Abdolreza Tavasolikhah (IRI)	Keith White (GBR)
PT2 – Mixed Trap Standing (Lower Limb) SG-L	Vesa Järvinen (FIN)	Filip Marinov (SVK)	Saverio Cuciti (ITA)
PT3 – Mixed Trap Standing (Upper Limb) SG-U	Gabriele Nanni (ITA)	Adrián Becker (ESP)	Francesco Nespeca (ITA)

== Medal table ==
* Host nation (United Arab Emirates)

Rank	Nation	Gold	Silver	Bronze	Total
1	Ukraine	3	4	2	9
2	South Korea	3	3	5	11
3	Poland	3	3	0	6
4	Slovakia	2	2	1	5
5	Italy	2	1	3	6
6	Turkey	2	1	1	4
7	France	2	1	0	3
7	United Arab Emirates*	2	1	0	3
9	Spain	1	1	0	2
10	Finland	1	0	0	1
10	North Macedonia	1	0	0	1
12	Iran	0	2	0	2
13	Germany	0	1	1	2
14	Denmark	0	1	0	1
14	Indonesia	0	1	0	1
16	Great Britain	0	0	2	2
17	Croatia	0	0	1	1
17	Czech Republic	0	0	1	1
17	Hungary	0	0	1	1
17	India	0	0	1	1
17	Israel	0	0	1	1
17	Slovenia	0	0	1	1
17	Uzbekistan	0	0	1	1
Totals (23 entries)		22	22	22	66
