= 2020 Summer Paralympics Parade of Nations =

During the opening ceremony

During the Parade of Nations at the opening ceremony of the 2020 Summer Paralympic Games, athletes from each participating country paraded in the Japan National Stadium, preceded by its flag and placard carrier. Each flag bearer had been chosen either by the nation's National Paralympic Committee (NPC) or by the athletes themselves.

The International Paralympic Committee, in accordance with the agreement signed with the International Olympic Committee in June 2001, follows the same rules as the protocol manuals issued by the Organizing Committees of each edition of the Olympic and Paralympic Games since the 2002 Winter Olympic and Paralympic Games.In this way, the order in which delegations enter the opening ceremony of the Paralympic Games does not follow the tradition of Greece being the first country to enter, as it is not the historical birthplace of the Paralympic Games. However, the rule of a couple being flag bearers for each participating National Olympic Committee was extended to the Paralympic Games and for the first time ever, each NPC was invited to appoint one female and one male athlete to jointly carry their flag during the Opening Ceremony.

== Incidents ==
=== Fall of Kabul ===
Under the assumption that Afghanistan's athletes would be unable to compete in the Paralympics due to the Fall of Kabul to the Taliban, the International Paralympic Committee invited the Office of the U.N. High Commissioner for Refugees (UNHCR) to represent Afghanistan in the Parade of Nations as a "sign of solidarity". However, the UNHCR declined to name a representative and a volunteer served as Afghanistan's flagbearer. The two athletes, Zakia Khudadadi and Hossain Rasouli, were evacuated from Afghanistan two days after the opening ceremony and later confirmed their participation in the Paralympics via a flight from Australia. The two carried Afghanistan's flag at the closing ceremony.

=== Non Participating Countries ===
New Zealand's and Brazil athletes also did not participate in the parade.

=== Salomon Islands withdrawn ===
Solomon Islands had its national flag paraded at the opening ceremony, but ultimately the Solomon Islands team withdrew from the 2020 Summer Paralympics due logistics issues.

== Order of Parade ==
This was the first edition in which the new protocols approved at the 138th Session of the International Olympic Committee held days before the ceremony were used officially.Some rules were maintained from previous procedures, such as the obligation for the Refugee Paralympic Team delegation to be the first to enter during the Parade of Nations and the maintenance of the entry of other delegations in the alphabetical order of the host country were maintained as the same entering as the last team. Another change was the positioning of the teams whose countries will be the future hosts of the next Summer Paralympic Games, which entered the reverse sequence.According to the original planning, the United States would be the 5th delegation to enter placed between Afghanistan and United Arab Emirates delegations, but as the 2028 Summer Paralympics are scheduled to be held in Los Angeles they were placed as 160th delegation. This situation also happened with France which according to the protocol manual would be the 119th delegation, positioned between Brazil and Bulgaria, but due to the fact that Paris will be the host city of 2024 Summer Paralympics who entered as the 161st delegation and finally the host nation Japan.

As these protocol rules were approved before Brisbane was announced as the 2032 Summer Paralympics host, Australia was not allocated to enter before the United States team entered in its natural position in the Japanese language order between El Salvador and Austria. All other teams entered in between in Gojūon order, based on the names of countries in Japanese. The names of the teams were announced in English, and Japanese, the official languages of the Paralympic movement and the host nation, in accordance with Olympic Charter and International Olympic Committee (IOC) and International Paralympic Committee (IPC) guidelines.

The Republic of North Macedonia had previously competed under the provisional name of Former Yugoslav Republic of Macedonia, because of the disputed status of its official name. It was officially renamed to North Macedonia in February 2019 and the National Paralympic Committee of North Macedonia (NMPC) was officially adopted in February 2020. It was North Macedonia's first appearance at the Summer Paralympics under its new name.

Several of the nations marched under their formal Japanese names. For example, the Great Britain delegation marched under the formal name Eikoku ("United Kingdom") rather than the better known informal Igirisu (イギリス), and China's delegation marched under Chūka Jinmin Kyōwakoku ("People's Republic of China") instead of the more common Chūgoku (中国).

== Countries and flag bearers ==
Order	Nation	Katakana (including some hiragana and kanji)	Romaji	Flag bearer	Sport	Ref.
1	Refugee Paralympic Team (RPT)	難民選手団	Nanmin Senshu-dan (Note: Short name Refugee Paralympic Team/難民選手団 on the panels and as announced.)	Alia Issa	Athletics	
1	Refugee Paralympic Team (RPT)	難民選手団	Nanmin Senshu-dan	Abbas Karimi	Swimming	
2	Iceland (ISL)	アイスランド	Aisurando	Thelma Björg Björnsdóttir	Swimming	
2	Iceland (ISL)	アイスランド	Aisurando	Patrekur Axelsson	Athletics	
3	Ireland (IRL)	アイルランド	Airurando	Jordan Lee	Athletics	
3	Ireland (IRL)	アイルランド	Airurando	Britney Arendse	Powerlifting	
4	Azerbaijan (AZE)	アゼルバイジャン	Azerubaijan	Olokhan Musayev	Athletics	
5	Afghanistan (AFG)	アフガニスタン	Afuganisutan	Games Volunteer (Note: Afghanistan's delegation was unable to march at the opening ceremony as the Taliban re-invaded Kabul days before the games. But then the IPC announced that two para-athletes from Afghanistan had arrived in Tokyo to participate in the Tokyo Paralympics.)	—N/a	
6	United Arab Emirates (UAE)	アラブ首長国連邦	Arabu Shuchōkoku Renpō	Mohamed Hammadi	Athletics	
6	United Arab Emirates (UAE)	アラブ首長国連邦	Arabu Shuchōkoku Renpō	Ayesha Almehairi	Shooting	
7	Algeria (ALG)	アルジェリア	Arujeria	Hocine Bettir	Powerlifting	
7	Algeria (ALG)	アルジェリア	Arujeria	Nebia Mehimda	Wheelchair basketball	
8	Argentina (ARG)	アルゼンチン	Aruzenchin	Yanina Martínez	Athletics	
8	Argentina (ARG)	アルゼンチン	Aruzenchin	Rodolfo Ramírez	Judo	
9	Aruba (ARU)	アルバ	Aruba	Elliott Andre Loonstra	Taekwondo	
10	Armenia (ARM)	アルメニア	Arumenia	Stas Nazaryan	Athletics	
11	Angola (ANG)	アンゴラ	Angora	Manuel Ernestro Jaime	Athletics	
12	Yemen (YEM)	イエメン	Iemen	Naseb Fateh Mohammed Alraoad	Athletics	
12	Yemen (YEM)	イエメン	Iemen	Belqes Ahmed Hezam Taresh	Athletics	
13	Israel (ISR)	イスラエル	Isuraeru	Moran Samuel	Rowing	
13	Israel (ISR)	イスラエル	Isuraeru	Nadav Levi	Boccia	
14	Italy (ITA)	イタリア	Itaria	Federico Morlacchi	Swimming	
14	Italy (ITA)	イタリア	Itaria	Beatrice Vio	Wheelchair fencing	
15	Iraq (IRQ)	イラク	Iraku	Garrah Tnaiash	Athletics	
15	Iraq (IRQ)	イラク	Iraku	Fatimah Suwaed	Athletics	
16	Islamic Republic of Iran (IRN)	イラン・イスラム共和国	Iran Isuramu Kyōwakoku	Nourmohammad Arekhi	Athletics	
16	Islamic Republic of Iran (IRN)	イラン・イスラム共和国	Iran Isuramu Kyōwakoku	Zahra Nemati	Archery	
17	India (IND)	インド	Indo	Tek Chand (Note: Replaced Mariyappan Thangavelu (as original flagbearer), who was quarantined due to possible COVID-19 exposure.)	Athletics	
18	Indonesia (INA)	インドネシア	Indoneshia	Hanik Puji Astuti	Shooting	
18	Indonesia (INA)	インドネシア	Indoneshia	Jaenal Aripin	Athletics	
19	Uganda (UGA)	ウガンダ	Uganda	David Emong	Athletics	
19	Uganda (UGA)	ウガンダ	Uganda	Husnah Kukundakwe	Swimming	
20	Ukraine (UKR)	ウクライナ	Ukuraina	Viktor Smyrnov	Swimming	
20	Ukraine (UKR)	ウクライナ	Ukuraina	Yelyzaveta Mereshko	Swimming	
21	Uzbekistan (UZB)	ウズベキスタン	Uzubekisutan	Mukhammad Rikhsimov	Athletics	
21	Uzbekistan (UZB)	ウズベキスタン	Uzubekisutan	Nurkhon Kurbanova	Athletics	
22	Uruguay (URU)	ウルグアイ	Uruguai	Henry Borges	Judo	
22	Uruguay (URU)	ウルグアイ	Uruguai	Lucia Dabezies	Swimming	
23	Great Britain (GBR)	英国	Eikoku	John Stubbs	Archery	
23	Great Britain (GBR)	英国	Eikoku	Eleanor Simmonds	Swimming	
24	Ecuador (ECU)	エクアドル	Ekuadoru	Darwin Gustavo Castro Reyes	Athletics	
24	Ecuador (ECU)	エクアドル	Ekuadoru	Kiara Rodriguez	Athletics	
25	Egypt (EGY)	エジプト	Ejiputo	Hesham Elshwikh	Sitting volleyball	
25	Egypt (EGY)	エジプト	Ejiputo	Fatma Omar	Powerlifting	
26	Estonia (EST)	エストニア	Esutonia	Robin Liksor	Swimming	
27	Ethiopia (ETH)	エチオピア	Echiopia	Tamiru Demisse	Athletics	
27	Ethiopia (ETH)	エチオピア	Echiopia	Tigist Mengistu	Athletics	
28	RPC (RPC) (Note: The delegation used a flag depicting a one-off emblem representing the Russian Paralympic Committee.)	RPC	Āru Pī Shī (Note: The panel and announcement both used the name RPC.) (Note: RPC was sorted based on its English abbreviation NPC RPC, in Japanese エヌ・ピー・シー・アール・ピー・シー (Enu Pī Shī Āru Pī Shī).)	Andrey Vdovin	Athletics	
28	RPC (RPC)	RPC	Āru Pī Shī	Elena Pautova	Athletics	
29	El Salvador (ESA)	エルサルバドル	Erusarubadoru	Herbert Aceituno	Powerlifting	
29	El Salvador (ESA)	エルサルバドル	Erusarubadoru	Norma Salinas	Athletics	
30	Australia (AUS)	オーストラリア	Ōsutoraria	DanIela di Toro	Table tennis	
30	Australia (AUS)	オーストラリア	Ōsutoraria	Ryley Batt	Wheelchair rugby	
31	Austria (AUT)	オーストリア	Ōsutoria	Natalija Eder	Athletics	
31	Austria (AUT)	オーストリア	Ōsutoria	Günther Matzinger	Paratriathlon	
32	Oman (OMA)	オマーン	Omān	Mohammed Al Mashaykhi	Athletics	
33	Netherlands (NED)	オランダ	Oranda	Fleur Jong	Athletics	
33	Netherlands (NED)	オランダ	Oranda	Jetze Plat	Cycling	
34	Ghana (GHA)	ガーナ	Gāna	Emmanuel Nii Tettey Oku	Powerlifting	
35	Cape Verde (CPV)	カーボベルデ	Kāboberude	Marilson Fernandes Semedo	Athletics	
35	Cape Verde (CPV)	カーボベルデ	Kāboberude	Keula Nidreia Pereira Semedo	Athletics	
36	Guyana (GUY)	ガイアナ	Gaiana	Walter Grant-Stuart	Cycling	
37	Kazakhstan (KAZ)	カザフスタン	Kazafusutan	Nurlan Dombayev	Taekwondo	
37	Kazakhstan (KAZ)	カザフスタン	Kazafusutan	Raushan Koishibayeva	Powerlifting	
38	Qatar (QAT)	カタール	Katāru	Abdulrahman Abdulqadir Fiqi	Athletics	
39	Canada (CAN)	カナダ	Kanada	Priscilla Gagné	Judo	
40	Gabon (GAB)	ガボン	Gabon	Davy Rendhel Moukagni Moukagni	Athletics	
41	Cameroon (CMR)	カメルーン	Kamerūn	Judith Mariette Lebog	Athletics	
42	Gambia (GAM)	ガンビア	Ganbia	Fatou Sanneh	Athletics	
43	Cambodia (CAM)	カンボジア	Kanbojia	Vun Van	Athletics	
44	North Macedonia (MKD)	北マケドニア	Kita Makedonia	Olivera Nakovska-Bikova	Shooting	
45	Guinea (GUI)	ギニア	Ginīa	Games Volunteer (Note: The Guinea team had two registered athlete for Athletics.)	—N/a	
46	Guinea-Bissau (GBS)	ギニアビサウ	Giniabisau	Mama Saliu Bari	Athletics	
47	Cyprus (CYP)	キプロス	Kipurosu	Andonis Aresti	Athletics	
47	Cyprus (CYP)	キプロス	Kipurosu	Karolina Pelendritou	Swimming	
48	Cuba (CUB)	キューバ	Kyūba	Omara Durand Elias	Athletics	
48	Cuba (CUB)	キューバ	Kyūba	Lorenzo Perez Escalona	Swimming	
49	Greece (GRE)	ギリシャ	Girisha	Anna Ntenta	Boccia	
49	Greece (GRE)	ギリシャ	Girisha	Athanasios Konstantinidis	Athletics	
50	Kyrgyzstan (KGZ)	キルギス	Kirugisu	Arystanbek Bazarkulov	Athletics	
51	Guatemala (GUA)	グアテマラ	Guatemara	Ericka Violeta Esteban Villatoro	Athletics	
51	Guatemala (GUA)	グアテマラ	Guatemara	Isaac Leiva Avila	Athletics	
52	Kuwait (KUW)	クウェート	Kuuēto	Ahmad Almutairi	Athletics	
53	Grenada (GRN)	グレナダ	Gurenada	Nye Cruickshank	Swimming	
54	Croatia (CRO)	クロアチア	Kuroachia	Mikela Ristoski	Athletics	
55	Kenya (KEN)	ケニア	Kenia	Hellen Wawira Kariuki	Powerlifting	
56	Côte d'Ivoire (CIV)	コートジボワール	Kōtojibuwāru	Adou Herve Ano	Powerlifting	
56	Côte d'Ivoire (CIV)	コートジボワール	Kōtojibuwāru	Sebehe Clarisse Lago	Athletics	
57	Costa Rica (CRC)	コスタリカ	Kosutarika	Camila Haase	Swimming	
57	Costa Rica (CRC)	コスタリカ	Kosutarika	Steven Román Chinchilla	Table Tennis	
58	Colombia (COL)	コロンビア	Koronbia	Érica Castaño	Athletics	
58	Colombia (COL)	コロンビア	Koronbia	Francisco Palomeque	Powerlifting	
59	Congo (CGO)	コンゴ	Kongo	Fifi Loukoula Loulendo	Athletics	
59	Congo (CGO)	コンゴ	Kongo	Emmanuel Grace Mouambako	Athletics	
60	D.R. Congo (COD)	コンゴ民主共和国	Kongo Minshu Kyōwakoku	Paulin Mayombo Mukendi	Athletics	
60	D.R. Congo (COD)	コンゴ民主共和国	Kongo Minshu Kyōwakoku	Rosette Luyina Kiese	Athletics	
61	Saudi Arabia (KSA)	サウジアラビア	Saujiarabia	Sarah Aljumaah	Athletics	
61	Saudi Arabia (KSA)	サウジアラビア	Saujiarabia	Ahmed Sharbatly	Equestrian	
62	São Tomé and Príncipe (STP)	サントメ・プリンシペ	Santome Purinshipe	Alex Anjos	Athletics	
63	Zambia (ZAM)	ザンビア	Zanbia	Monica Munga	Athletics	
64	Sierra Leone (SLE)	シエラレオネ	Shierareone	Sorie Kargbo	Athletics	
64	Sierra Leone (SLE)	シエラレオネ	Shierareone	Juan Faith Jackson	Athletics	
65	Jamaica (JAM)	ジャマイカ	Jamaika	Sylvia Grant	Athletics	
66	Georgia (GEO)	ジョージア	Jōjia	Davit Kavtaradze	Athletics	
67	Syrian Arab Republic (SYR)	シリア・アラブ共和国	Shiria Arabu Kyōwakoku	Mohamad Mohamad	Athletics	
68	Singapore (SGP)	シンガポール	Shingapōru	Muhammad Diroy Noordin	Athletics	
69	Zimbabwe (ZIM)	ジンバブエ	Jinbabue	Pamela Vimbai Shumba	Athletics	
69	Zimbabwe (ZIM)	ジンバブエ	Jinbabue	Vimbai Zvinowanda	Athletics	
70	Switzerland (SUI)	スイス	Suisu	Philipp Handler	Athletics	
70	Switzerland (SUI)	スイス	Suisu	Manuela Schär	Athletics	
71	Sweden (SWE)	スウェーデン	Suwēden	Helene Ripa	Paracanoe	
71	Sweden (SWE)	スウェーデン	Suwēden	Stefan Olsson	Wheelchair tennis	
72	Spain (ESP)	スペイン	Supein	Michelle Alonso Morales	Swimming	
72	Spain (ESP)	スペイン	Supein	Ricardo Ten Argilés	Cycling	
73	Sri Lanka (SRI)	スリランカ	Suriranka	Dinesh Priyantha Herath	Athletics	
74	Slovakia (SVK)	スロバキア	Surobakia	Samuel Andrejčík	Boccia	
74	Slovakia (SVK)	スロバキア	Surobakia	Veronika Vadovičová	Shooting	
75	Slovenia (SLO)	スロベニア	Surobenia	Dejan Fabčič	Archery	
76	Senegal (SEN)	セネガル	Senegaru	Youssoupha Diouf	Athletics	
77	Serbia (SRB)	セルビア	Serubia	Saška Sokolov	Athletics	
77	Serbia (SRB)	セルビア	Serubia	Laslo Šuranji	Shooting	
78	St Vincent and the Grenadines (VIN)	セントビンセント及びグレナディーン諸島	Sentobinsento Oyobi Gurenadīn Shotō	Dexroy Creese	Swimming	
79	Somalia (SOM)	ソマリア	Somaria	Mahdi Abshir Omar	Athletics	
— (Note: The delegation was represented in the Parade, but ultimately withdrew from competition.)	Solomon Islands (SOL)	ソロモン諸島	Soromon Shotō	Games Volunteer	—N/a	
80	Thailand (THA)	タイ	Tai	Subin Tipmanee	Boccia	
80	Thailand (THA)	タイ	Tai	Pongsakorn Paeyo	Athletics	
81	Republic of Korea (KOR)	大韓民国	Daikanminkoku	Yejin Choi	Boccia	
82	Chinese Taipei (TPE)	チャイニーズ・タイペイ	Chainīzu Taipei	Yang Chuan-hui	Athletics	
82	Chinese Taipei (TPE)	チャイニーズ・タイペイ	Chainīzu Taipei	Liu Ya-ting	Athletics	
83	Tajikistan (TJK)	タジキスタン	Tajikisutan	Akmal Qodirov	Athletics	
84	United Republic of Tanzania (TAN)	タンザニア連合共和国	Tanzania Rengō Kyōwakoku	Ignas Madumla Mtweve	Athletics	
85	Czech Republic (CZE)	チェコ共和国	Cheko Kyōwakoku	Eva Datinská	Shot Put	
85	Czech Republic (CZE)	チェコ共和国	Cheko Kyōwakoku	Arnošt Petráček	Swimming	
86	Central African Republic (CAF)	中央アフリカ共和国	Chūō Afurika Kyōwakoku	Veronica Ndakara	Athletics	
87	People's Republic of China (CHN)	中華人民共和国	Chūka Jinmin Kyōwakoku	Zhou Jiamin	Archery	
87	People's Republic of China (CHN)	中華人民共和国	Chūka Jinmin Kyōwakoku	Wang Hao	Athletics	
88	Tunisia (TUN)	チュニジア	Chunishia	Raoua Tlili	Athletics	
88	Tunisia (TUN)	チュニジア	Chunishia	Walid Ktila	Athletics	
89	Chile (CHI)	チリ	Chiri	Francisca Mardones Sepúlveda	Athletics	
89	Chile (CHI)	チリ	Chiri	Alberto Abarza	Swimming	
90	Denmark (DEN)	デンマーク	Denmāku	Daniel Wagner Jørgensen	Athletics	
90	Denmark (DEN)	デンマーク	Denmāku	Lisa Kjær Gjessing	Taekwondo	
91	Germany (GER)	ドイツ	Doitsu	Michael Teuber	Cycling	
91	Germany (GER)	ドイツ	Doitsu	Mareike Miller	Wheelchair basketball	
92	Togo (TOG)	トーゴ	Tōgo	Koumealo Kabissa	Athletics	
93	Dominican Republic (DOM)	ドミニカ共和国	Dominika Kyōwakoku	Lourdes Alejandra Aybar Díaz	Swimming	
93	Dominican Republic (DOM)	ドミニカ共和国	Dominika Kyōwakoku	Patricio Tse Anibal Lopez Fernandez	Swimming	
94	Turkey (TUR)	トルコ	Toruko	Havva Elmalı	Athletics	
94	Turkey (TUR)	トルコ	Toruko	Ridvan Aksoy	Wheelchair basketball	
95	Nigeria (NGR)	ナイジェリア	Naijeria	Lucy Ejike	Powerlifting	
95	Nigeria (NGR)	ナイジェリア	Naijeria	Tajudeen Agunbiade	Table Tennis	
96	Namibia (NAM)	ナミビア	Namibia	Johannes Nambala	Athletics	
96	Namibia (NAM)	ナミビア	Namibia	Lahja Ishitile	Athletics	
97	Nicaragua (NCA)	ニカラグア	Nikaragua	Carlos Alberto Castillo	Athletics	
97	Nicaragua (NCA)	ニカラグア	Nikaragua	Arlen Hidalgo	Athletics	
98	Niger (NIG)	ニジェール	Nijēru	Ibrahim Dayabou	Athletics	
99	New Zealand (NZL)	ニュージーランド	Nyūjīrando	Games Volunteer (Note: New Zealand's delegation did not participate who were quarantined and isolated for 7 days.)	—N/a	
100	Nepal (NEP)	ネパール	Nepāru	Palesha Goverdhan	Taekwondo	
101	Norway (NOR)	ノルウェー	Noruwē	Jens Lasse Dokkan	Equestrian	
101	Norway (NOR)	ノルウェー	Noruwē	Ida-Louiser Overland	Athletics	
102	Bahrain (BRN)	バーレーン	Bārēn	Rooba Alomari	Athletics	
102	Bahrain (BRN)	バーレーン	Bārēn	Ahmed Meshaima	Athletics	
103	Haiti (HAI)	ハイチ	Haichi	Ywenson Registre	Athletics	
104	Pakistan (PAK)	パキスタン	Pakisutan	Haider ALI	Athletics	
105	Panama (PAN)	パナマ	Panama	Jhan Carlos Wisdom Lungrin	Athletics	
105	Panama (PAN)	パナマ	Panama	Iveth Valdes Romero	Athletics	
106	Papua New Guinea (PNG)	パプアニューギニア	Papuanyūginia	Morea Mararos	Athletics	
106	Papua New Guinea (PNG)	パプアニューギニア	Papuanyūginia	Nelly Ruth Leva	Athletics	
107	Bermuda (BER)	バミューダ	Bamyūda	Jessica Cooper Lewis	Athletics	
108	Paraguay (PAR)	パラグアイ	Paraguai	Melissa Tillner	Athletics	
108	Paraguay (PAR)	パラグアイ	Paraguai	Rodrigo Hermosa	Swimming	
109	Barbados (BAR)	バルバドス	Barubadosu	Antwahn Boyce-Vaughan	Swimming	
110	Palestine (PLE)	パレスチナ	Paresuchina	Husam F A Azzam	Athletics	
111	Hungary (HUN)	ハンガリー	Hangarī	Gyöngyi Dani	Wheelchair fencing	
112	Fiji (FIJ)	フィジー	Fijī	Iosefo Rakesa	Athletics	
113	Philippines (PHI)	フィリピン	Firipin	Jerrold Mangliwan	Athletics	
114	Finland (FIN)	フィンランド	Finrando	Henry Manni	Athletics	
114	Finland (FIN)	フィンランド	Finrando	Pia-Pauliina Reitti	Equestrian	
115	Bhutan (BHU)	ブータン	Būtan	Chimi Dema	Athletics	
115	Bhutan (BHU)	ブータン	Būtan	Pema Rigsel	Archery	
116	Puerto Rico (PUR)	プエルトリコ	Puerutoriko	Yaimillie Marie Diaz Colon	Athletics	
116	Puerto Rico (PUR)	プエルトリコ	Puerutoriko	Carmelo Rivera Fuentes	Athletics	
117	Faroe Islands (FRO)	フェロー諸島	Ferō Shotō	Hávard Vatnhamar	Athletics	
118	Brazil (BRA)	ブラジル	Burajiru	Petrucio Ferreira dos Santos	Athletics	
118	Brazil (BRA)	ブラジル	Burajiru	Evelyn de Oliveira	Boccia	
119	Bulgaria (BUL)	ブルガリア	Burugaria	Milena Todorova	Shooting	
120	Burkina Faso (BUR)	ブルキナファソ	Burukinafaso	Kouilibi Victorine Guissou	Athletics	
120	Burkina Faso (BUR)	ブルキナファソ	Burukinafaso	Ferdinand Compaore	Athletics	
121	Burundi (BDI)	ブルンジ	Burunji	Rémy Nikobimeze	Athletics	
121	Burundi (BDI)	ブルンジ	Burunji	Adéline Mushiranzigo	Athletics	
122	Virgin Islands, US (ISV)	米領バージン諸島	Bei-ryō Bājin Shotō	Jahmaris Nesbitt	Athletics	
123	Vietnam (VIE)	ベトナム	Betonamu	Cao Ngọc Hùng	Athletics	
123	Vietnam (VIE)	ベトナム	Betonamu	Châu Hoàng Tuyết Loan	Powerlifting	
124	Benin (BEN)	ベナン	Benin	Fayssal Atchiba	Athletics	
124	Benin (BEN)	ベナン	Benin	Marina Charlotte Houndalowan	Athletics	
125	Venezuela (VEN)	ベネズエラ	Benezuera	Lisbeli Marina Vera Andrade	Athletics	
125	Venezuela (VEN)	ベネズエラ	Benezuera	Abrahan Jesus Ortega Abello	Athletics	
126	Belarus (BLR)	ベラルーシ	Berarūshi	Liudmila Vauchok	Rowing	
127	Peru (PER)	ペルー	Perū	Leonor Espinoza Carranza	Taekwondo	
127	Peru (PER)	ペルー	Perū	Efraín Sotacuro	Athletics	
128	Belgium (BEL)	ベルギー	Berugī	Michèle George	Equestrian	
128	Belgium (BEL)	ベルギー	Berugī	Bruno Vanhove	Goalball	
129	Poland (POL)	ポーランド	Pōrando	Maciej Lepiato	Athletics	
129	Poland (POL)	ポーランド	Pōrando	Joanna Mendak	Swimming	
130	Bosnia and Herzegovina (BIH)	ボスニア・ヘルツェゴビナ	Bosunia Herutsuegobina	Zerina Skomorac	Shooting	
130	Bosnia and Herzegovina (BIH)	ボスニア・ヘルツェゴビナ	Bosunia Herutsuegobina	Haris Eminovic	Table Tennis	
131	Botswana (BOT)	ボツワナ	Botsuana	Gloria Majaga	Athletics	
132	Portugal (POR)	ポルトガル	Porutogaru	Beatriz Monteiro	Badminton	
132	Portugal (POR)	ポルトガル	Porutogaru	Miguel Monteiro	Athletics	
133	Hong Kong, China (HKG)	ホンコン・チャイナ	Honkon Chaina	Yam Kwok-fan	Athletics	
133	Hong Kong, China (HKG)	ホンコン・チャイナ	Honkon Chaina	Hui Ka-chun	Swimming	
134	Honduras (HON)	ホンジュラス	Honjurasu	Carlos Velásquez	Athletics	
135	Madagascar (MAD)	マダガスカル	Madagasukaru	Games Volunteer (Note: The Madagascar team had only one registered athlete, but did not participate in the parade.)	—N/a	
136	Malawi (MAW)	マラウイ	Maraui	Taonere Banda	Athletics	
137	Mali (MLI)	マリ	Mari	Korotoumou Coulibaly	Athletics	
137	Mali (MLI)	マリ	Mari	Youssouf Coulibaly	Athletics	
138	Malta (MLT)	マルタ	Maruta	Vladyslava Kravchenko	Swimming	
138	Malta (MLT)	マルタ	Maruta	Thomas Borg	Athletics	
139	Malaysia (MAS)	マレーシア	Marēshia	Bonnie Bunyau Gustin	Powerlifting	
139	Malaysia (MAS)	マレーシア	Marēshia	Siti Noor Iasah	Athletics	
140	South Africa (RSA)	南アフリカ	Minami Afurika	Kgothatso Montjane	Wheelchair tennis	
141	Mexico (MEX)	メキシコ	Mekishiko	Amalia Pérez	Powerlifting	(Note: Among the Citations, "Toca su turno" (in Spanish), dated (24 August 2021), mentions "Edgar Barajas" as a male flag bearer. However, comparing the other Citations with photos, It is certain that "Diego Lopez Diaz" was actually the male flag bearer of Mexico.)
141	Mexico (MEX)	メキシコ	Mekishiko	Diego Lopez Diaz	Swimming	(Note: Among the Citations, "Toca su turno" (in Spanish), dated (24 August 2021), mentions "Edgar Barajas" as a male flag bearer. However, comparing the other Citations with photos, It is certain that "Diego Lopez Diaz" was actually the male flag bearer of Mexico.)
142	Mauritius (MRI)	モーリシャス	Mōrishusu	Marie Emmanuelle Anais Alphonse	Athletics	
143	Mozambique (MOZ)	モザンビーク	Mozanbīku	Edmilsa Governo	Athletics	
143	Mozambique (MOZ)	モザンビーク	Mozanbīku	Hilario Chavela	Athletics	
144	Maldives (MDV)	モルディブ	Morudibu	Fathimath Ibrahim	Athletics	
144	Maldives (MDV)	モルディブ	Morudibu	Mohamed Mazin	Athletics	
145	Republic of Moldova (MDA)	モルドバ共和国	Morudoba Kyōwakoku	Oleg Crețul	Judo	
145	Republic of Moldova (MDA)	モルドバ共和国	Morudoba Kyōwakoku	Larisa Marinenkova	Powerlifting	
146	Morocco (MAR)	モロッコ	Morokko	Saida Amoudi	Athletics	
146	Morocco (MAR)	モロッコ	Morokko	Houssam Ighilli	Football 5-a-side	
147	Mongolia (MGL)	モンゴル	Mongoru	Munkhbat Aajim	Judo	
147	Mongolia (MGL)	モンゴル	Mongoru	Selengee Demberel	Archery	
148	Montenegro (MNE)	モンテネグロ	Monteneguro	Filip Radović	Table Tennis	
148	Montenegro (MNE)	モンテネグロ	Monteneguro	Marijana Goranović	Athletics	
149	Jordan (JOR)	ヨルダン	Yorudan	Ahmad Hindi	Athletics	
150	Lao People's Democratic Republic (LAO)	ラオス人民民主共和国	Raosu Jinmin Minshu Kyōwakoku	Ken Thepthida	Athletics	
151	Latvia (LAT)	ラトビア	Ratobia	Aigars Apinis	Athletics	
151	Latvia (LAT)	ラトビア	Ratobia	Ieva Melle	Archery	
152	Lithuania (LTU)	リトアニア	Ritoania	Andrius Skuja	Athletics	
152	Lithuania (LTU)	リトアニア	Ritoania	Oksana Dobrovolskaja	Athletics	
153	Libya (LBA)	リビア	Ribia	Mohamed Alsanousi Abidzar	Taekwondo	
154	Liberia (LBR)	リベリア	Riberia	Thomas Mulbah	Athletics	
154	Liberia (LBR)	リベリア	Riberia	Patience Johnson	Athletics	
155	Romania (ROU)	ルーマニア	Rūmania	Alex Bologa	Judo	
155	Romania (ROU)	ルーマニア	Rūmania	Tabita Vulturar	Athletics	
156	Luxembourg (LUX)	ルクセンブルク	Rukusenburuku	Tom Habscheid	Athletics	
157	Rwanda (RWA)	ルワンダ	Ruwanda	Hermas Muvunyi	Athletics	
158	Lesotho (LES)	レソト	Resoto	Litsitso Khotlele (Note: Instead, a volunteer was holding the flag in his hand.)	Athletics	
159	Lebanon (LBN)	レバノン	Rebanon	Arz Zahreddine	Athletics	
160	United States of America (USA)	アメリカ合衆国	Amerika Gasshūkoku	Chuck Aoki	Wheelchair rugby	
160	United States of America (USA)	アメリカ合衆国	Amerika Gasshūkoku	Melissa Stockwell	Paratriathlon	
161	France (FRA)	フランス	Furansu	Sandrine Martinet	Judo	
161	France (FRA)	フランス	Furansu	Stéphane Houdet	Wheelchair tennis	
162	Japan (JPN)	日本	Nihon	Koyo Iwabuchi	Table tennis	
162	Japan (JPN)	日本	Nihon	Mami Tani	Paratriathlon	

== Reviews ==
The names of each para-athlete who participated in the Opening Ceremony's Parade were projected and scrolled on the "digital signage" equivalent to the inner diameter of the stadium.

== See also ==
- 2020 Summer Olympics Parade of Nations

Preceded by Rio de Janeiro	Summer Paralympics Parade of Nations; Tokyo; XVI Paralympic Summer Games (2020)	Succeeded by Paris
