= 2020 in shooting =

This article lists the main target shooting events and their results for 2020.

== World Events ==
=== 2020 Olympic Games ===
The 2020 Olympic Games in Tokyo were postponed until 2021.

- Shooting at the 2020 Summer Olympics – Qualification
- Shooting at the 2020 Summer Olympics
- Shooting at the 2020 Summer Paralympics – Qualification
- Shooting at the 2020 Summer Paralympics

=== International Shooting Sport Federation ===
==== ISSF World Cup ====
- 2020 ISSF World Cup

=== FITASC ===
2020 Results

== Regional Events ==
=== Europe ===
European Shooting Confederation:

- February 23 - March 1: 2020 European 10 m Events Championships in Wrocław, Poland

B Matches:

- February 6-8: InterShoot, held in Den Haag, Netherlands

== National Events ==
=== United Kingdom ===
==== NRA Imperial Meeting ====
- October, held at the National Shooting Centre, Bisley A mini-Imperial was held between lockdowns, with social-distancing enabled by the outdoor nature of fullbore rifle shooting.
  - Queen's Prize winner: DC Luckman (GBR)
  - Grand Aggregate winner: Parag Patel (GBR)
