= Shooting at the 2020 Summer Paralympics – R1 Men's 10 metre air rifle standing SH1 =

R1 Men's 10 metre air rifle standing SH1 at the XVI Paralympic Games
- Venue: Asaka Shooting Range
- Dates: 30 August 2021
- Competitors: 21 from 15 nations

Medalists
1st place, gold medalist(s)		Dong Chao	China
2nd place, silver medalist(s)		Andrii Doroshenko	Ukraine
3rd place, bronze medalist(s)		Park Jin-ho	South Korea

The Men's R1 10 metre air rifle standing SH1 event at the 2020 Summer Paralympics took place on 30 August at the Asaka Shooting Range in Tokyo.

The event consisted of two rounds: a qualifier and a final. In the qualifier, each shooter fired 60 shots with an air rifle at 10 metres distance from the "standing" (interpreted to include seated in wheelchairs) position.

The top 8 shooters in the qualifying round moved on to the final round.

== Records ==
Prior to this competition, the existing world and Paralympic records were as follows.

Qualification records
World Record	Park Jin-ho (KOR)	628.9	Incheon, South Korea	19 October 2014
Paralympic Record	Park Jin-ho (KOR)	625.3	Rio de Janeiro, Brazil	8 September 2016

Final records
World Record	Radoslav Malenovský (SVK)	250.4	Al Ain, United Arab Emirates	23 March 2018
Paralympic Record	Not established	–	–	–

== Schedule ==
All times are Japan Standard Time (UTC+9)

Date	Time	Round
Monday, 30 August 2021	10:45	Qualification
Monday, 30 August 2021	13:15	Final

== Qualification round ==
Rank	Shooter	Nation	1	2	3	4	5	6	Total	Notes
1	Park Jin-ho	South Korea	105.2	106.2	105.0	105.0	105.1	104.8	631.3	Q, QWR, QPR
2	Yurii Stoiev	Ukraine	101.4	104.9	104.7	101.4	104.5	102.8	619.6	Q
3	Radoslav Malenovský	Slovakia	101.7	104.1	103.3	103.7	102.0	103.7	618.5	Q
4	Lee Jang-ho	South Korea	103.2	102.5	102.5	102.4	104.9	102.9	618.4	Q
5	Dong Chao	China	103.4	103.9	105.3	101.9	101.2	101.9	617.6	Q
6	Didier Richard	France	103.1	102.8	103.1	103.7	100.8	102.9	616.4	Q
7	Swaroop Mahavir Unhalkar	India	103.1	101.6	102.2	102.0	102.8	103.5	615.2	Q
8	Andrii Doroshenko	Ukraine	102.2	103.1	101.8	103.8	103.6	99.9	614.4	Q
9	Andrey Kozhemyakin	RPC	100.5	101.0	103.7	102.2	103.2	103.2	613.8	
10	Franc Pinter	Slovenia	103.2	101.4	103.3	102.9	100.8	101.3	612.9	
11	Sotirios Galogavros	Greece	101.5	101.9	101.4	102.2	101.6	104.0	612.6	
12	Laslo Šuranji	Serbia	98.5	102.8	103.3	103.9	100.7	103.4	612.6	
13	Håkan Gustafsson	Sweden	102.3	101.7	102.0	101.7	105.0	99.9	612.6	
14	Atidet Intanon	Thailand	98.3	101.2	102.8	103.8	100.5	100.7	607.3	
15	Phiraphong Buengbok	Thailand	100.9	101.7	103.1	101.5	98.1	101.5	606.8	
16	Jacopo Cappelli	Italy	96.7	104.4	102.1	99.1	102.5	101.6	606.4	
17	Kim Su-wan	South Korea	98.7	103.5	100.9	99.1	100.7	101.9	604.8	
18	Abdulla Sultan Alaryani	United Arab Emirates	103.0	97.4	97.6	100.9	101.9	100.4	601.2	
19	Savaş Üstün	Turkey	100.3	100.7	99.0	99.5	101.3	98.6	599.4	
20	Deepak Saini	India	97.9	99.7	101.3	100.2	96.9	96.6	592.6	
21	Tian Fugang	China	97.2	98.3	99.1	97.0	100.8	99.7	592.1	

== Final ==
Rank	Shooter	Nation	1	2	3	4	5	6	7	8	9	Total	Notes
1st place, gold medalist(s)	Dong Chao	China	51.0	102.9	122.6	143.1	163.9	184.3	205.1	226.1	246.4	246.4	PR
2nd place, silver medalist(s)	Andrii Doroshenko	Ukraine	50.8	100.9	121.7	141.7	163.0	183.8	204.2	224.6	245.1	245.1	
3rd place, bronze medalist(s)	Park Jin-ho	South Korea	50.7	100.8	121.7	142.4	162.9	184.1	205.0	224.5	—	224.5	
4	Swaroop Mahavir Unhalkar	India	51.2	102.1	122.7	143.0	164.2	183.6	203.9	—		207.3	
5	Radoslav Malenovský	Slovakia	49.6	101.2	120.3	140.8	161.3	181.4	—			181.4	
6	Lee Jang-ho	South Korea	52.5	101.4	120.6	141.5	161.2	—				161.2	
7	Didier Richard	France	49.8	101.5	121.0	140.6	—					140.6	
8	Yurii Stoiev	Ukraine	49.7	100.0	119.7	—						119.7	
