= India at the 2020 Summer Paralympics =

- IPC code: IND
- NPC: Paralympic Committee of India
- Website: www.paralympic.org.in

in Tokyo, Japan
- Competitors: 54 in 9 sports
- Flag bearer (opening): Tek Chand
- Flag bearer (closing): Avani Lekhara
- Medals Ranked 24th: Gold 5 Silver 8 Bronze 6 Total 19

Summer Paralympics appearances (overview)
- 1968; 1972; 1976–1980; 1984; 1988; 1992; 1996; 2000; 2004; 2008; 2012; 2016; 2020; 2024

India competed in the 2020 Summer Paralympics in Tokyo, Japan, from 24 August to 5 September 2021. India made its official debut at the 1968 Summer Paralympics and has appeared in every edition of the Summer Paralympics since 1984.

India sent a contingent consisting of 54 athletes competing across nine sports in the Games. Athlete Tek Chand was the flag bearer during the opening ceremony and shooter Avani Lekhara carried the flag during the closing ceremony.

This was India's most successful Paralympic campaign at the time with 19 medals including five gold, eight silver and six bronze medals. Before this edition, India had won a combined total of 12 medals across all previous Paralympics combined.

== Background ==
The Paralympic Committee of India (PCI) was formed in 1994, five years after the International Paralympic Committee (IPC) was established in 1989. The ninth International Stoke Mandville Games was later designated as the first Paralympics in 1960. The International Stoke Mandeville Games Federation organized the Paralympic Games till 1984. The 1988 Seoul Paralympics was the first to use the Paralympics name and the event has been held in the same host city as the corresponding Summer Olympic Games since then. The nation made its Paralympics debut in 1968 and have appeared in every edition of the Summer Paralympic Games since 1984. This edition of the Games marked the nation's 12th appearance at the Summer Paralympics.

The Indian contingent for the games consisted of 54 people across nine sports. Athlete Mariyappan Thangavelu was the designated flag bearer during the opening ceremony but was later replaced by Tek Chand due to COVID-19 quarantine regulations. Shooter Avani Lekhara carried the flag during the closing ceremony.

== Medalists ==
This was India's most successful Paralympic campaign with 19 medals including five gold, eight silver and six bronze medals. Before this edition, India had won a combined total of 12 medals across all previous Paralympics combined

Bhavina Patel won India's first medal, a silver in Table Tennis. Avani Lekhara became the first Indian woman paralympic athlete to win a gold medal. She won another bronze medal to become the first Indian woman multiple medalist in Paralympic shooting. Shooter Manish Narwal won another gold medal in 50 m pistol SH1 event and Singhraj Adhana also won two shooting medals, a silver and a bronze. Harvinder Singh became the first Indian to win a medal in Paralympic archery after he won a bronze medal in the men's recurve event. In badminton, Indian shuttlers won four medals including two gold medals by Pramod Bhagat and Krishna Nagar, a silver medal by Suhas Yathiraj and a bronze medal by Manoj Sarkar.

In athletics, India won eight medals including one gold, five silver and two bronze medals. Sumit Antil won a gold medal in Javelin throw F64 with a new world record. Mariyappan Thangavelu (high jump T63) and Devendra Jhajharia (Javelin throw F46) won silver medals to go along with the gold medals they won in the 2016 Games. This was Jhajharia third medal, which is the most by an Indian Para athlete in the Paralympic Games along with Joginder Singh Bedi. Nishad Kumar and Praveen Kumar won silver medals in high jump T47 and high jump T64 respectively. Sharad Kumar (high jump T63) and Sundar Singh Gurjar (Javelin throw F46) won bronze medals. Indian discus thrower Vinod Kumar who won a bronze in the F52 category discus throw event, was later disqualified after being found ineligible in the disability classification assessment.

Medal	Name	Sport	Event	Date
(gold) Gold	Avani Lekhara	Shooting	Women's R2 10 metre air rifle standing SH1	30 August
(gold) Gold	Sumit Antil	Athletics	Men's javelin throw F64	30 August
(gold) Gold	Manish Narwal	Shooting	Mixed P4 50 metre pistol SH1	4 September
(gold) Gold	Pramod Bhagat	Badminton	Men's singles SL3	4 September
(gold) Gold	Krishna Nagar	Badminton	Men's singles SH6	5 September
(silver) Silver	Bhavina Patel	Table tennis	Women's individual class 4	29 August
(silver) Silver	Nishad Kumar	Athletics	Men's high jump T47	29 August
(silver) Silver	Yogesh Kathuniya	Athletics	Men's discus throw F56	30 August
(silver) Silver	Devendra Jhajharia	Athletics	Men's javelin throw F46	30 August
(silver) Silver	Mariyappan Thangavelu	Athletics	Men's high jump T63	31 August
(silver) Silver	Praveen Kumar	Athletics	Men's high jump T64	3 September
(silver) Silver	Singhraj Adhana	Shooting	Mixed P4 50 metre pistol SH1	4 September
(silver) Silver	Suhas Lalinakere Yathiraj	Badminton	Men's singles SL4	5 September
(bronze) Bronze	Sundar Singh Gurjar	Athletics	Men's javelin throw F46	30 August
(bronze) Bronze	Singhraj Adhana	Shooting	Men's P1 10 metre air pistol SH1	31 August
(bronze) Bronze	Sharad Kumar	Athletics	Men's high jump T63	31 August
(bronze) Bronze	Avani Lekhara	Shooting	Women's R8 50 metre Rifle 3 positions SH1	3 September
(bronze) Bronze	Harvinder Singh	Archery	Men's individual recurve open	3 September
(bronze) Bronze	Manoj Sarkar	Badminton	Men's singles SL3	4 September

=== Summary ===
Medals by sport
Sport	Gold	Silver	Bronze	Total
Shooting	2	1	2	5
Badminton	2	1	1	4
Athletics	1	5	2	8
Table tennis	0	1	0	1
Archery	0	0	1	1
Total	5	8	6	19

Medals by day
Day	Date	Gold	Silver	Bronze	Total
5	29 August	0	2	0	2
6	30 August	2	2	1	5
7	31 August	0	1	2	3
10	3 September	0	1	2	3
11	4 September	2	1	1	4
12	5 September	1	1	0	2
Total		5	8	6	19

Medals by gender
Gender	Gold	Silver	Bronze	Total
Male	4	7	5	16
Female	1	1	1	3
Total	5	8	6	19

== Competitors ==
The Indian contingent for the games consisted of 54 athletes competing across nine sports.

Sport	Men	Women	Total
Archery	4	1	5
Athletics	20	4	24
Badminton	5	2	7
Paracanoeing	0	1	1
Powerlifting	1	1	2
Shooting	8	2	10
Swimming	2	0	2
Table Tennis	0	2	2
Taekwondo	0	1	1
Total	40	14	54

== Archery ==
India archers achieved four quota places in the 2019 World Para Archery Championships. Jyoti Baliyan got the bipartite commission invitation to participate in the tournament.

Recurve

Athlete	Event	Ranking round		Round of 64	Round of 32	Round of 16	Quarterfinals	Semifinals	Finals	
Athlete	Event	Score	Seed	Opposition score	Opposition score	Opposition score	Opposition score	Opposition score	Opposition score	Rank
Harvinder Singh	Men's individual	600	21	—N/a	Travisani (ITA); W 6–5	Tsydendorzhiev (RPC); W 6–5	Szarszewski (GER); W 6–2	Mather (USA); L 4–6	Kim M-s (KOR); W 6–5	3rd place, bronze medalist(s)
Vivek Chikara	Men's individual	609	10	—N/a	Megahamulea (SRI); W 6–2	Phillips (GBR); L 3–7	Did not advance			9

Compound

Athlete	Event	Ranking round		Round of 64	Round of 32	Round of 16	Quarterfinals	Semifinals	Finals	
Athlete	Event	Score	Seed	Opposition score	Opposition score	Opposition score	Opposition score	Opposition score	Opposition score	Rank
Rakesh Kumar	Men's individual	699	3	Bye	Ngai KC (HKG); W 144–131	Marecak (SVK); W 140–137	Ai Xl (CHN); L 143–145	Did not advance		5
Shyam Sundar Swami	Men's individual	682	21	Bye	Stutzman (USA); L 139–142	Did not advance				17
Jyoti Baliyan	Women's individual	671	15	—N/a	Leonard (IRL); L 137–141	Did not advance				17
Jyoti Baliyan; Rakesh Kumar	Mixed team	1370	6	—N/a		Thailand (THA); W 147–141	Turkey (TUR); L 151–153	Did not advance		5

== Athletics ==
The following Indian athletes achieved the quota places by through eligible events and via the Athletics World Rankings. The Paralympic Committee of India announced the final list of the athletes after the selection trials held in New Delhi.

Track

Athlete	Event	Heat		Final	
Athlete	Event	Result	Rank	Result	Rank
Simran Sharma	Women's 100m T13	12.69 SB	5	Did not advance	

Field

Athlete	Event	Result	Rank
Amit Kumar Saroha	Men's club throw F51	27.77 SB	5
Dharambir Nain	Men's club throw F51	25.59 SB	8
Vinod Kumar	Men's discus throw F52	CNC	
Yogesh Kathuniya	Men's discus throw F56	44.38 SB	2nd place, silver medalist(s)
Nishad Kumar	Men's high jump T47	2.06 AR	2nd place, silver medalist(s)
Ram Pal	Men's high jump T47	1.94	5
Mariyappan Thangavelu	Men's high jump T63	1.86 SB	2nd place, silver medalist(s)
Sharad Kumar	Men's high jump T63	1.83 SB	3rd place, bronze medalist(s)
Varun Singh Bhati	Men's high jump T63	1.77 SB	7
Praveen Kumar	Men's high jump T64	2.07 AR	2nd place, silver medalist(s)
Navdeep Singh	Men's javelin throw F41	40.80	4
Sundar Singh Gurjar	Men's javelin throw F46	64.01 SB	3rd place, bronze medalist(s)
Ajeet Singh	Men's javelin throw F46	56.15	8
Devendra Jhajharia	Men's javelin throw F46	64.35 PB	2nd place, silver medalist(s)
Ranjeet Bhati	Men's javelin throw F57	NM	
Sandeep Chaudhary	Men's javelin throw F64	62.20 SB	4
Sumit Antil	Men's javelin throw F64	68.55 WR	1st place, gold medalist(s)
Arvind Malik	Men's shot put F35	13.48	7
Soman Rana	Men's shot put F57	13.81	4
Tek Chand	Men's shot put F55	9.04	8
Kashish Lakra	Women's club throw F51	12.66 SB	6
Ekta Bhyan	Women's club throw F51	8.38 SB	8
Bhagyashree Jadhav	Women's shot put F34	7.00 PB	7

Key

- NM = No Mark
- WR = World record
- AR = Area (Asian) Record
- SB = Season best
- PB = Personal best
- CNC = Classification not completed

== Badminton ==
Badminton made its debut at the Paralympic Games and seven Indian shuttlers qualified for the games based on qualification rankings or bipartite invitation.

Men

Athlete	Event	Group Stage				Semifinal	Final / BM	
Athlete	Event	Opposition Score	Opposition Score	Opposition Score	Rank	Opposition Score	Opposition Score	Rank
Pramod Bhagat	Singles SL3	Sarkar (IND); W (21–10, 21–23, 21–9)	Chyrkov (UKR); W (21–12, 21–9)	—N/a	1 Q	Fujihara (JPN); W (21–11, 21–16)	Bethell (GBR); W (21–14, 21–17)	1st place, gold medalist(s)
Manoj Sarkar	Singles SL3	Bhagat (IND); L (10–21, 23–21, 9–21)	Chyrkov (UKR); W (21–16, 21–9)	—N/a	2 Q	Bethell (GBR); L (8–21, 10–21)	Fujihara (JPN); W (22–20, 21–13)	3rd place, bronze medalist(s)
Tarun Dhillon	Singles SL4	Teamarrom (THA); W (21–7, 21–13)	Shin K-h (KOR); W (21–18, 15–21, 21–17)	Setiawan (INA); L (19–21, 9–21)	2 Q	Mazur (FRA); L (16–21, 21–16, 18–21)	Setiawan (INA); L (17–21, 11–21)	4
Suhas Lalinakere Yathiraj	Singles SL4	Pott (GER); W (21–9, 21–3)	Susanto (INA); W (21–6, 21–12)	Mazur (FRA); L (15–21, 17–21)	2 Q	Setiawan (INA); W (21–9, 21–15)	Mazur (FRA); L (21–15, 17–21, 15–21)	2nd place, silver medalist(s)
Krishna Nagar	Singles SH6	Taresoh (MAS); W (22–20, 21–10)	Tavares (BRA); W (21–17, 21–14)	—N/a	1 Q	Coombs (GBR); W (21–10, 21–11)	Chu MK (HKG); W (21–17, 16–21, 21–17)	1st place, gold medalist(s)

Women

Athlete	Event	Group Stage			Quarterfinal	Semifinal	Final / BM	
Athlete	Event	Opposition Score	Opposition Score	Rank	Opposition Score	Opposition Score	Opposition Score	Rank
Palak Kohli	Singles SU5	Suzuki (JPN); L (4–21, 7–21)	Bağlar (TUR); W (21–12, 21–18)	2 Q	Kameyama (JPN); L (11–21, 15–21)	Did not advance		
Parul Parmar	Singles SL4	Cheng Hf (CHN); L (8–21, 2–21)	Seibert (GER); L (21–23, 21–19, 15–21)	3	—N/a	Did not advance		
Parul Parmar; Palak Kohli	Doubles SL3–SU5	Cheng Hf / Ma Hh (CHN); L (7–21, 5–21)	Morin / Noël (FRA); L (12–21, 20–22)	3	—N/a	Did not advance		

Mixed

Athlete	Event	Group Stage			Semifinal	Final / BM	
Athlete	Event	Opposition Score	Opposition Score	Rank	Opposition Score	Opposition Score	Rank
Pramod Bhagat; Palak Kohli	Doubles SL3–SU5	Mazur / Noël (FRA); L (9–21, 21–15, 19–21)	Teamarrom / Saensupa (THA); W (21–15, 21–19)	2 Q	Susanto / Oktila (INA); L (3–21, 15–21)	Fujihara / Sugino (JPN); L (21–23, 19–21)	4

== Paracanoeing ==
Prachi Yadav was the only Indian para canoe athlete at the Tokyo Paralympics and she achieved the quota after finishing 8th in International Canoe World Championship 2019.

Athlete	Event	Heat		Semifinals		Final	
Athlete	Event	Time	Rank	Time	Rank	Time	Rank
Prachi Yadav	VL2	1:11.098	4 Q	1:07.397	3 Q	1:07.329	8

== Powerlifting ==
Sakina Khatun and Jaideep Deswal received the bipartite invitation to participate in the games. Sakina became the first-ever female powerlifter from the country to participate in the games. While this was Jaideep's second Paralympics.

Athlete	Event	Score	Rank
Jaideep Deswal	Men's 65 kg	—	—
Sakina Khatun	Women's 50 kg	93	5

== Shooting ==
Indian shooters achieved quota places for through various qualifying events. Manish Narwal and Deepender Singh became the first shooters to qualify after winning the gold and silver medal respectively at the 2018 World Shooting Para Sport World Cup at Châteauroux and Singhraj Adhana joined them by securing a berth in the mixed pistol event. Avani Lekhara became the first female shooter to secure a Paralympic berth. Swaroop Mahavir Unhalkar and Sidhartha Babu secured quotas in the 2019 World Shooting Para Sport Championships at Sydney. Other shooters secured the remaining quota places at the 2021 Para Sport World Cup held in Lima. Paralympic Committee of India announced the 10-member Indian Team for the Games on 8 July 2021.

Men

Athlete	Event	Qualification		Final	
Athlete	Event	Points	Rank	Points	Rank
Manish Narwal	P1 10 m air pistol SH1	575	1 Q	135.8	7
Deepender Singh	P1 10 m air pistol SH1	560	10	Did not advance	
Singhraj Adhana	P1 10 m air pistol SH1	569	6 Q	216.8	3rd place, bronze medalist(s)
Swaroop Mahavir Unhalkar	R1 10 m air rifle standing SH1	615.2	7 Q	203.9	4
Deepak Saini	R1 10 m air rifle standing SH1	592.6	20	Did not advance	
Deepak Saini	R7 50 m rifle 3 positions SH1	1114	18	Did not advance	

Women

Athlete	Event	Qualification		Final	
Athlete	Event	Points	Rank	Points	Rank
Rubina Francis	P2 10 m air pistol SH1	560	7 Q	128.5	7
Avani Lekhara	R2 10 m air rifle SH1	621.7	7 Q	249.6 EWR PR	1st place, gold medalist(s)
Avani Lekhara	R8 50 m rifle 3 positions SH1	1176	2 Q	445.9	3rd place, bronze medalist(s)

Mixed

Athlete	Event	Qualification		Final	
Athlete	Event	Points	Rank	Points	Rank
Rahul Jakhar	P3 25 m pistol SH1	576	2 Q	12	5
Akash	P3 25 m pistol SH1	551	20	Did not advance	
Manish Narwal	P4 50 m pistol SH1	533	7 Q	218.2 PR	1st place, gold medalist(s)
Singhraj Adhana	P4 50 m pistol SH1	536	4 Q	216.7	2nd place, silver medalist(s)
Akash	P4 50 m pistol SH1	507	27	Did not advance	
Deepak Saini	R3 10 m air rifle prone SH1	624.9	43	Did not advance	
Sidhartha Babu	R3 10 m air rifle prone SH1	625.5	40	Did not advance	
Avani Lekhara	R3 10 m air rifle prone SH1	629.7	27	Did not advance	
Avani Lekhara	R6 50 m rifle prone SH1	612	28	Did not advance	
Deepak Saini	R6 50 m rifle prone SH1	602.2	46	Did not advance	
Sidhartha Babu	R6 50 m rifle prone SH1	617.2	9	Did not advance	

== Swimming ==
Suyash Jadhav achieved the Minimum qualifying Standard to qualify for the Games. Later, Niranjan Mukundan received bi-partite invitation to participate in the 50 m Butterfly S7 event.

Athlete	Event	Heat		Final	
Athlete	Event	Time	Rank	Time	Rank
Niranjan Mukundan	Men's 50m butterfly S7	33.82	6	Did not advance	
Suyash Jadhav	Men's 50m butterfly S7	32.36	5	Did not advance	
Suyash Jadhav	Men's 100 m breaststroke SB7	—N/a		DSQ	
Suyash Jadhav	Men's 200m individual medley SM7	DNS		Did not advance	

DNS - Did not start; DSQ- Disqualified

== Table tennis ==
India entered two athletes into the table tennis competition at the games. Bhavina Patel and Sonal Patel qualified via the overall Rankings.

Athlete	Event	Group Stage			Round of 16	Quarterfinals	Semifinals	Final	
Athlete	Event	Opposition Result	Opposition Result	Rank	Opposition Result	Opposition Result	Opposition Result	Opposition Result	Rank
Sonal Patel	Women's individual C3	Li Q (CHN); L 2–3	Lee M-g (KOR); L 1–3	3	Did not advance				
Bhavina Patel	Women's individual C4	Zhou Y (CHN); L 0–3	Shackleton (GBR); W 3–1	2 Q	de Oliveira (BRA); W 3–0	Perić-Ranković (SRB); W 3–0	Zhang M (CHN); W 3–2	Zhou Y (CHN); L 0–3	2nd place, silver medalist(s)
Sonal Patel; Bhavina Patel	Women's team C4-5	—N/a				China (CHN); L 0–2	Did not advance		

== Taekwondo ==
Aruna Tanwar received the bipartite commission invitation for the Games. She withdrew during the competition due to injury.

Women

Athlete	Event	Round of 16	Quarterfinals	Semifinals	Repechage 1	Repechage 2	Final	
Athlete	Event	Opposition Result	Opposition Result	Opposition Result	Opposition Result	Opposition Result	Opposition Result	Rank
Aruna Tanwar	K44 −49 kg	Jovanovic (SRB); W 29–9	Espinoza (PER); L 21–84	Did not advance	Fataliyeva (AZE); L W/O	Did not advance		

== See also ==
- India at the Paralympics
- India at the 2020 Summer Olympics
