= Shooting at the 2016 Summer Paralympics =

Shooting at the XV Paralympic Games
- Venue: National Shooting Center
- Dates: 8–14 September 2016
- Competitors: 140

Shooting at the 2016 Summer Paralympics consisted of twelve events, eight for rifle and 4 for pistol, across a range of men's, women's and mixed events.

Paralympic shooters were also classified according to the extent of their disability. The classification system allows shooters to compete against others with a similar level of function.

Shooting classifications are:

- SH1 - competitors who do not need a shooting stand
- SH2 - competitors who use a shooting stand to support the firearm's weight

== Qualification ==
There were 140 athletes (100 male, 40 female) taking part in this sport. Any athlete awarded a qualification slot in one event is permitted to enter other eligible event if they have a minimum qualification score. Therefore, fields in each event are likely to be significantly larger than the qualification quotas below.

Qualification slots will be allocated as follows:

Qualification for Shooting at the 2016 Summer Paralympics
Men			Women		
P1 10m Pistol SH1	R1 10m Rifle Standing SH1	R7 50m Rifle 3 Positions SH1	P2 10m Pistol SH1	R2 10m Rifle Standing SH1	R8 50m Rifle 3 Positions SH1
China; Great Britain; Great Britain; Hong Kong; Iran; South Korea; South Korea; Russia; Russia; Serbia; Sweden; Turkey	China; China; Great Britain; Germany; Germany; South Korea; Serbia; Sweden; Ukraine; Ukraine	France; India; Ireland; South Korea; Russia; Slovenia; Sweden; Sweden; Thailand; United Arab Emirates	Hungary; Iran; Iran; Macedonia; Thailand; Turkey; Ukraine; Issy Bailey (GBR)° Yelena Taranova (AZE)°	Australia; China; Norway; Slovakia; Turkey	Australia; Germany; South Korea; South Korea; Sweden
Mixed
P3 25m Pistol SH1	P4 50m Pistol SH1	R3 10m Rifle prone SH1	R6 50m Rifle prone SH1	R5 10m Rifle prone SH2	R4 10m Rifle standing SH2
China; China; Hungary; Macedonia; Zenuer von Kohne (RSA); Russia; Switzerland; Ukraine; United States; Brazil; Norway; South Korea; Christopher Pitt (AUS)°	Brazil; South Korea; Mongolia; Poland; Portugal; Serbia; Thailand; Turkey; Turkey; Uzbekistan; Italy; South Korea; Russia; Ukraine; Iran; Turkey; Damir Bosnjak (CRO)°	Australia; France; Great Britain; Italy; South Korea; New Zealand; Russia; Slovakia; Turkey; United Arab Emirates; China; China; Germany; Norway; United States; Thailand; Jozef Siroky (SVK)°	Spain; France; Great Britain; Germany; Israel; Norway; United Arab Emirates; United Arab Emirates; Great Britain; Great Britain; United States; Russia	Denmark; Great Britain; Great Britain; Great Britain; New Zealand; New Zealand; Russia; Slovenia; Serbia; Serbia; Turkey; Finland; Italy; Japan; Norway; Sweden	Australia; Australia; Brazil; China; France; Greece; South Korea; South Korea; Kuwait; Slovenia; Sweden; Ukraine; Bulgaria; Iran; Norway; Slovenia; United States; United States

° : Bipartite invitation of named athlete.

== Medal summary ==
=== Medal table ===
This ranking sorts countries by the number of gold medals earned by their shooters (in this context a nation is an entity represented by a National Paralympic Committee). The number of silver medals is taken into consideration next and then the number of bronze medals. If, after the above, countries are still tied, equal ranking is given and they are listed alphabetically.

Rank	Nation	Gold	Silver	Bronze	Total
1	China (CHN)	5	2	1	8
2	Slovakia (SVK)	2	1	0	3
3	Iran (IRI)	2	0	0	2
4	Ukraine (UKR)	1	1	1	3
5	Slovenia (SLO)	1	1	0	2
6	Serbia (SRB)	1	0	1	2
7	United Arab Emirates (UAE)	0	3	0	3
8	South Korea (KOR)	0	2	5	7
9	Germany (GER)	0	1	0	1
9	Sweden (SWE)	0	1	0	1
11	Israel (ISR)	0	0	1	1
11	Turkey (TUR)	0	0	1	1
11	United States (USA)	0	0	1	1
11	Uzbekistan (UZB)	0	0	1	1
Totals (14 entries)		12	12	12	36

=== Medalists ===
Men

Event	Class	Gold	Silver	Bronze
P1 10 m air pistol	SH1	Yang Chao; China	Lee Ju-hee; South Korea	Server Ibragimov; Uzbekistan
R1 10 m air rifle standing	SH1	Dong Chao; China	Abdullah Sultan Alaryani; United Arab Emirates	Kim Su Wan; South Korea
R7 50 m rifle 3 positions	SH1	Laslo Šuranji; Serbia	Abdullah Sultan Alaryani; United Arab Emirates	Doron Shaziri; Israel

Women

Event	Class	Gold	Silver	Bronze
P2 10 m air pistol	SH1	Sareh Javanmardi; Iran	Olga Kovalchuk; Ukraine	Ayşegül Pehlivanlar; Turkey
R2 10 m air rifle standing	SH1	Veronika Vadovičová; Slovakia	Zhang Cuiping; China	Yan Yaping; China
R8 50 m rifle 3 positions	SH1	Zhang Cuiping; China	Veronika Vadovičová; Slovakia	Lee Yun-ri; South Korea

Mixed

Event	Class	Gold	Silver	Bronze
P3 25 m pistol	SH1	Huang Xing; China	Joackim Norberg; Sweden	Lee Ju-hee; South Korea
P4 50 m pistol	SH1	Sareh Javanmardi; Iran	Yang Chao; China	Oleksii Denysiuk; Ukraine
R3 10 m air rifle prone	SH1	Veronika Vadovičová; Slovakia	Natascha Hiltrop; Germany	Lee Jang-ho; South Korea
R6 50 m rifle prone	SH1	Zhang Cuiping; China	Abdullah Sultan Alaryani; United Arab Emirates	Laslo Šuranji; Serbia
R5 10 m air rifle prone	SH2	Vasyl Kovalchuk; Ukraine	Kim Geun-soo; South Korea	McKenna Dahl; United States
R4 10 m air rifle standing	SH2	Veselka Pevec; Slovenia	Franček Gorazd Tiršek; Slovenia	Kim Geun-soo; South Korea

== See also ==
- Paralympic shooting
- Shooting at the 2016 Summer Olympics
