= Shooting at the 2024 Summer Paralympics – R2 Women's 10 metre air rifle standing SH1 =

R2 Women's 10 metre air rifle standing SH1 at the XVII Paralympic Games
- Venue: National Shooting Centre
- Dates: 30 August 2024
- Competitors: 17 from 13 nations

Medalists
1st place, gold medalist(s)		Avani Lekhara	India
2nd place, silver medalist(s)		Lee Yunri	South Korea
3rd place, bronze medalist(s)		Mona Agarwal	India

The R2 Women's 10 metre air rifle standing SH1 event at the 2024 Summer Paralympics took place on 31 August at the National Shooting Centre in Châteauroux.

The event consisted of two rounds: a qualifier and a final.

The top 8 shooters in the qualifying round moved on to the final round.

== Records ==
Prior to this competition, the existing world and Paralympic records were as follows.

Qualification records
World record	Iryna Shchetnik (UKR)	629.2	Granada, Spain	2 June 2024
Paralympic record	Zhang Cuiping (CHN); Iryna Shchetnik (UKR)	626.0	Tokyo, Japan	30 August 2021

Final records
World record	Iryna Shchetnik (UKR)	252.0	Rotterdam, Netherlands	19 August 2023
Paralympic record	Avani Lekhara (IND)	249.6	Tokyo, Japan	30 August 2021

== Schedule ==
All times are Central European Summer Time (UTC+2)

Date	Time	Round
Friday, 30 August 2024	09:00	Qualification
Friday, 30 August 2024	11:45	Final

== Qualification ==
Rank	Shooter	Nation	1	2	3	4	5	6	Total	Inner 10s	Notes
1	Iryna Shchetnik	Ukraine	104.2	103.7	104.3	104.3	105.0	106.0	627.5		Q, QPR
2	Avani Lekhara	India	102.9	105.5	103.4	105.3	105.6	103.1	625.8		Q
3	Veronika Vadovičová	Slovakia	103.7	105.2	103.8	104.0	104.7	102.8	624.2		Q
4	Lee Yoo-jeong	South Korea	104.3	102.5	104.3	103.6	104.0	105.3	624.0		Q
5	Mona Agarwal	India	103.9	103.4	103.8	102.4	104.1	105.5	623.1		Q
6	Anna Benson	Sweden	104.1	103.2	103.3	103.9	103.4	102.6	620.5		Q
7	Zhong Yixin	China	102.9	103.4	101.7	101.9	103.8	103.9	617.6		Q
8	Zhang Cuiping	China	102.1	101.9	102.3	102.9	105.4	103.0	617.6		Q
9	Roghayeh Shojaei	Iran	104.3	102.3	102.6	103.9	101.7	102.3	617.1		
10	Kinley Dem	Bhutan	105.8	102.5	102.1	103.2	101.0	102.2	616.8		
11	Lee Yunri	South Korea	101.9	102.2	103.8	100.6	103.5	102.8	614.8		
12	Natalie Smith	Australia	102.1	101.8	101.8	101.0	103.4	104.0	614.1		
13	Wannipa Leungvilai	Thailand	100.5	103.1	102.3	101.7	101.9	103.8	613.3		
14	Çağla Baş	Turkey	102.4	100.7	102.2	102.7	102.6	102.4	613.0		
15	Emilia Babska	Poland	103.9	102.3	101.6	101.8	101.8	99.4	610.8		
16	Chutima Saenlar	Thailand	101.3	99.5	103.5	101.8	100.8	99.4	606.3		
17	Jelena Pantović	Serbia	99.5	99.3	101.0	98.4	99.0	100.1	597.3		

== Final ==
Rank	Shooter	Nation	1	2	3	4	5	6	7	8	9	Total	Notes
1st place, gold medalist(s)	Avani Lekhara	India	51.8	103.7	124.5	145.9	166.3	187.0	208.0	229.3	249.7	249.7	PR
2nd place, silver medalist(s)	Lee Yunri	South Korea	52.2	104.2	124.5	145.3	165.5	186.2	207.9	229.3	246.8	246.8	
3rd place, bronze medalist(s)	Mona Agarwal	India	51.2	102.7	124.2	144.8	165.4	186.8	208.1	228.7		228.7	
4	Iryna Shchetnik	Ukraine	50.6	102.6	123.9	144.7	165.0	185.7	205.4			205.4	
5	Anna Benson	Sweden	52.4	102.9	123.5	144.3	165.1	184.7				184.7	
6	Veronika Vadovičová	Slovakia	52.0	102.8	122.9	144.0	165.0					165.0	SO
7	Zhong Yixin	China	50.8	103.3	122.8	143.3						143.2	
8	Zhang Cuiping	China	49.7	100.0	120.2							120.2	
