= Tanguy de La Forest =

French Paralympic shooter (born 1978)

Personal information
- Born: 21 April 1978 (age 48) Rennes, France

Sport
- Country: Brazil
- Sport: Shooting para sport
- Disability class: SH2
Medal record
Shooting para sport
Representing France
Paralympic Games
Gold medal – first place	2024 Paris	Mixed 10 m air rifle prone SH2
Silver medal – second place	2024 Paris	Mixed 10 m air rifle standing SH2
World Championships
Gold medal – first place	2022 Al Ain	Mixed 10 m air rifle standing SH2
Gold medal – first place	2022 Al Ain	Mixed 50 m rifle prone SH2
Gold medal – first place	2023 Lima	Mixed 10m air rifle standing SH2
Bronze medal – third place	2023 Lima	Mixed 10 m rifle prone SH2
Gold medal – first place	2023 Lima	Mixed 50 m rifle prone SH2
Gold medal – first place	2023 Lima	Mixed 10 m air rifle standing SH2 - team
Gold medal – first place	2023 Lima	Mixed 10 m rifle prone SH2 - team
Gold medal – first place	2023 Lima	Mixed 50 m rifle prone SH2 - team

Tanguy de La Forest (born 21 April 1978) is a French Paralympic shooter. He won two medals at the 2024 Summer Paralympics in Paris, a silver in the 10 m air rifle standing SH2 event and a gold in the 10 m air rifle prone SH2 event.

== Early life ==
Tanguy de La Forest was born in Rennes on 21 April 1978. At a young age, he was diagnosed with infantile spinal muscular atrophy and by the time he was ten years old, he had to use an electric wheelchair. He discovered shooting at a very young age before starting sport shooting.

== Sporting career ==
A member of the French Paralympic shooting team since 1998, La Forest participated in his first Paralympic Games in Athens in 2004, where he competed in the Mixed Air Rifle Standing SH2 and Mixed Air Rifle Prone SH2 events.

In 2014, La Forest won a bronze medal at the World Shooting Para Sport Championships. La Forest won a gold medal at the 2022 World Shooting Para Sport Championships, in the Mixed 10m Air Rifle Standing SH2 and Mixed 50m Rifle Prone SH2 events. La Forest competed in the 2024 Summer Paralympics, where is also a member of the board member of the Paris Organising Committee for the 2024 Olympic and Paralympic Games. On 30 August 2024, he won the silver medal at the 10 m air rifle standing SH2 event. The following day, he won the gold medal in the 10 m air rifle prone SH2 event.

== Personal life ==
Professionally, La Forest created a recruitment firm “Défi RH” in 2006, specializing in the recruitment of disabled workers.
