= Lorraine Lambert =

British Paralympic sport shooter

Personal information
- Born: 29 September 1972 (age 53)
- Home town: Portsmouth, England
- Occupation(s): youth development lead Kings Trust and Counsellor
- Employer: kings trust
- Spouse: Wayne

Sport
- Country: United Kingdom
- Sport: Sport shooting
- Disability: amputee

Achievements and titles
- Paralympic finals: 5th place finish
- World finals: 3rd place finish R8
- Highest world ranking: 2

Lorraine Lambert (born 29 September 1972) is a British Paralympic shooter who was fifth in the 2016 Summer Paralympics in Rio. Lambert was chosen for the postponed 2020 Summer Paralympics in Tokyo in August 2021.

== Life ==
Lambert was born in 1972 and she is from Milton, a suburb of Portsmouth. She joined a youth organisation called The Nautical Training Corps and that was where she learned to shoot and began to shoot competitively.

Lambert was working as a climbing instructor when she damaged her leg as the result of a fall while rock climbing in 1997. She had sixteen operations to try and fix the damage and reduce the pain in her leg. In 2005 she first tried to find a surgeon who was willing to amputate her leg so that she could improve her life. Her leg was removed in 2010. Lambert returned to competitive shooting when she took part in the "LimbPower Games" in 2010. The following year she entered competitions and won a gold medal at an event in Dubai.

Lambert went to Rio de Janeiro in 2016 to represent the UK in the Paralympics. She finished fifth in the women's 50 m Rifle (3 Positions) in the SH1 category at Rio in 2016. She came behind Veronika Vadovičová, but the gap had narrowed by the time Vadovičová took the gold medal in the 2017 Para Sport World Cup held in the UAE and Lambert was in the medals in the silver position. At the World Shooting Para Sport World Cup in 2019 she took the first British medal of the competition winning bronze in the women's R8 50 m rifle 3 positions SH1.

Lambert was chosen to represent the UK by shooting at the postponed 2020 Summer Paralympics in Tokyo. The other British women paralympic shooters chosen are pistol shooter Issy Bailey and Lesley Stewart. Each of the women in the UK team had been fitted with a designer bra. Lambert believed that this had improved her shooting and optical sensor readings have confirmed that. Competitive shooters are allowed to touch their guns with their hands but they are not allowed to let the gun touch their body. This is also important as shooters take care to avoid the movements caused by their heart beating to create a movement in the rifle. The designers created the new bra to minimise the chance of Lambert's breasts touching the gun.

Lambert came 15th in the R8 women's 50m competition at the 2020 Olympic games (in 2021), although she had wanted a medal. Her husband, Wayne, and her family were pleased anyway. She planned to take a year off.
