= Lesley Stewart (shooter) =

British paralympic shooter

- Born: 1979 (age 46–47)
- Occupation: Military police officer
- Employer: British Army
- Known for: Paralympic shooter

Lesley Stewart (born c. 1979) is a British paralympic shooter who qualified for the postponed 2020 Summer Paralympics. She was a police officer in the British Army who had a small accident. Unknown causes created years of pain in her leg.

== Life ==
Stewart was born about 1979. She and her family are from Blairgowrie in Scotland.

In 2000 she became a military police officer and she went to Iraq with the British Army. Her life changed dramatically in 2004 when she was stationed in Germany. She took a routine combat fitness test and although she felt something give in her back she completed the test. Two weeks later she was screaming in agony. Her left foot had been in pain two days after the test and it began to turn inward. No one at the time understood what was happening but for the next five years she was in pain. Her family visited her at the rehabilitation centre Headley Court in Surrey but she never remembered the visit as she was drugged with powerful painkillers.

The doctors tried to straighten her leg using a plaster cast, but her leg broke the plaster. They cut ligaments but with no success and amputation of her left leg was the only solution.

She had another injury in 2016 and this meant that she could not compete for a long while.

Stewart was a late addition to the British paralympic team for the postponed 2020 Summer Paralympics in Tokyo after she gained a bronze medal at the WSPS World Cup in Lima. The other British women paralympic shooters chosen are Portsmouth based Lorraine Lambert and pistol shooter Issy Bailey from Cirencester.
