= Gebben Miles =

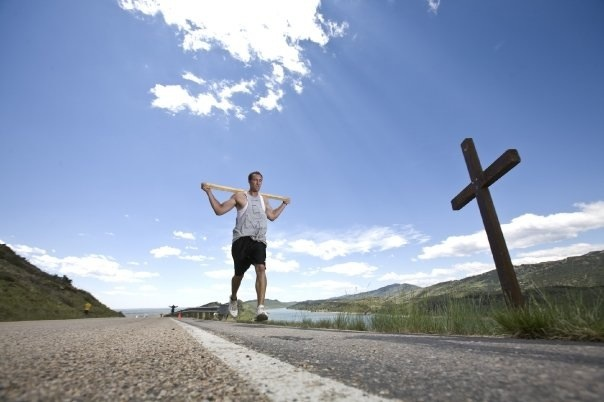
Gebben Miles in training

Gebben Miles is a professional clay pigeon shooter. In 2012 Gebben won the FITASC World Championship. Miles has numerous other titles and championships including several team World Championships and several National titles.
