= 2021 IPSC Action Air World Shoot =

Cancelled sport shooting competition

- Dates: April

The 2021 IPSC Action Air World Shoot II was to be the second airsoft shooting IPSC Action Air World Shoot, to be held in Sochi, Russia in 2022. However, in reaction to the 2022 Russian invasion of Ukraine, the IPSC cancelled all scheduled and future level 3 and above international competitions in Russia, including this one.
