= Singhraj Adhana =

Indian sport shooter

Personal information
- Born: 26 January 1982 (age 44) Faridabad, Haryana, India

Sport
- Country: India
- Coached by: Omprakash, JP Nautiyal and Subhash Rana
Medal record
Representing India
Paralympic Games
Silver medal – second place	2020 Tokyo	Mixed 50 m pistol SH1
Bronze medal – third place	2020 Tokyo	10 m air pistol SH1

Singhraj Adhana (born 26 January 1982 in Faridabad, Haryana), known mononymously as Singhraj, is an Indian paralympian and shooter. He won a silver medal in the Mixed 50m pistol SH1 and a bronze medal in the Men's P1 10 metre air pistol SH1 at the 2020 Summer Paralympics.

== Career achievements ==
- Gold medal in P4 Team and Silver in P4 Individual events in Chateauroux World Cup 2018, France
- Bronze medal in P4 of Para Asian Games 2018 in Jakarta, Indonesia.
- Gold medal in Pl team event and a silver medal in P4 individual event at Al Ain World Cup 2019, UAE.
- Two Gold in P1, P4 team events and 2 Bronzes in P4 individual and P6 Team events in Osijek World Cup 2019.
- Bronze medal in P4 team event in Sydney World Championship 2019, Australia.
- Gold medal in P1, Silver in P4 team event and Bronze in P4 individual event in Al Ain World Cup 2021 held in UAE.
- Bronze medal in P1 10 metre air pistol SH1 at the 2020 Summer Paralympics.
- Silver medal in Mixed 50m pistol SH1 at the 2020 Summer Paralympics.

== Education ==
- According to various sources he was a student in class 9th at Rawal Convent School, Rawal Educational Society chaired by Mr. Anil Rawal.
- He with Manish Narwal was appreciated at Rawal International School, Saroorpur industrial region, Faridabad on 18-9-2021 for bringing the achievements to India by Mr. CB Rawal.

== See also ==
- India at the 2020 Summer Paralympics
- Shooting at the 2018 Asian Para Games
