= Jaideep Deswal =

Indian discus thrower (born 1989)

Personal information
- Nationality: Indian
- Born: Jaideep Deswal; 30 December 1989 (age 36) Rohtak, Haryana India
- Height: 172 cm (5 ft 8 in)
- Weight: 72 Kg

Sport
- Country: India
- Sport: Athletics F-42,
- Event: Discus throw
- Club: Haryana Paralympic Association: India
- Coached by: Vijay Munishwar
Medal record
Men's Discus throw
Representing India
Asia Oceania Athletics Championships
Gold medal – first place	Dubai	Discus Throw

Jaideep Singh Deswal (born 30 December 1989) is an Indian athletics competitor, representing India at the 2012 Summer Paralympics in London, United Kingdom, in the discus throw event under F42 classification. He underwent training at Cardiff Metropolitan University, Wales, for the Games. He is supported by GoSports Foundation through the Para champions programme.

== Early life and background ==
Jaideep was 4 months old when he was given wrong vaccination for his fever by the doctor resulting in loss of strength in his left leg. Retaining a keen interest in the sport from an early age, Jaideep started practising and competing in the discus throw in 2007 upon suggestions from his friends. His father, recently retired from Rajasthan police and his family, living in a small village on the outskirts of Rohtak, was not familiar with sports before. However, egged on by his uncle, Jaideep used to be a regular trainer in the fields of his native village.

== Career ==
Jaideep idolizes Hockey Legend Major Dhyanchand and his sporting career has seen him represent India at the 2012 Paralympic Games in London, 2014 Asian Para and Commonwealth Games and the 2015 World Para Athletics Championships. Last year Jaideep took to powerlifting as well and has recently represented his country at the 2017 World Para Athletics Championships in the Discus throw, also qualified for the 2017 World Powerlifting Championships

== Achievements ==
Paralympics

Year	Venue	Event	Score	Result
2012	London	Discus Throw	39.77m	7th Rank

Commonwealth games

Year	Venue	Event	Score	Result
2014	Glasgow	Discus Throw	38.68m	4th Rank

Asian games

Year	Venue	Event	Score	Result
2014	Incheon	Discus Throw	37.48m	4th Rank
