= Swaroop Unhalkar =

Indian Paralympics rifle shooter (born 1987)

Swaroop Mahavir Unhalkar (born 1987) is an Indian Para Rifle Shooter. He is currently World No 13 in Men's 10m Air Rifle standing SH1 (World Shooting Para Sport Rankings).

== 2020 Summer Paralympics ==
He Qualified For Paralympics Games at Tokyo, Japan and represented India Team in Shooting at 2020 Summer Paralympics in Tokyo, Japan. He qualified for finals of Men's 10m AR Standing SH1 shooting and stood 4th with a score of 203.9.

== See also ==
- Paralympic Committee of India
- India at the Paralympics
