= Tek Chand =

Indian para-athlete

Personal information
- Nationality: Indian
- Home town: Rewari district of Haryana, India
- Spouse: Tamanna Sharma

Sport
- Event(s): Javelin (F54) and Shot put (F55)

Achievements and titles
- Paralympic finals: 2020 Summer Paralympics
Medal record
Representing India
Men's athletics
Bronze medal – third place	2018 Jakarta	Shot put F54/55
Bronze medal – third place	2022 Hangzhou	Javelin throw F55

Tek Chand is an Indian Paralympic shot putter and javelin thrower. He was born in the Rewari district of Haryana, and was disabled due to a road accident. He represented India in the 2020 Paralympic Games held in Tokyo in the men's shot-put F55 category. He was made the flag-bearer of the Indian contingent at the opening ceremony, replacing the quarantined Mariyappan Thangavelu. He finished last out of eight competitiors in the event, managing a best of 9.04 metres. He was originally listed for the men's F54 javelin, but later relisted. He has won the bronze medal in the 2018 Asian Para games.
