= Huang Xing (sport shooter) =

Chinese paralympic sport shooter

Sport
- Country: China
- Sport: Paralympic shooting
Medal record
Representing China
Men's shooting para sport
Paralympic Games
Gold medal – first place	2016 Rio de Janeiro	Mixed 25 m pistol
Silver medal – second place	2020 Tokyo	10 m air pistol
Gold medal – first place	2020 Tokyo	Mixed 25 m pistol
Asian Para Games
Gold medal – first place	2022 Hangzhou	10 m air pistol

Huang Xing is a Chinese paralympic sport shooter.

== Career ==
He participated at the 2016 Summer Paralympics in the shooting competition, being awarded the gold medal in the mixed 25 m pistol. Xing participated at the 2020 Summer Paralympics in the shooting competition, being awarded the silver medal in the men's 10 m air pistol event. He also participated in the mixed 25 m pistol at the 2020 Summer Paralympics, being awarded the gold medal.
