= Slovenia at the 2020 Summer Paralympics =

- IPC code: SLO
- NPC: Sports Federation for the Disabled of Slovenia
- Website: www.zsis.si

in Tokyo
- Competitors: 7 in 6 sports
- Medals: Gold 0 Silver 1 Bronze 1 Total 2

Summer Paralympics appearances (overview)
- 1992; 1996; 2000; 2004; 2008; 2012; 2016; 2020; 2024

Other related appearances
- Yugoslavia (1972–2000)

Slovenia competed at the 2020 Summer Paralympics in Tokyo, Japan, from 24 August to 5 September 2021.

== Medalists ==
Medal	Athlete/s	Sport	Event	Date
Silver	Franček Gorazd Tiršek	Shooting	Mixed 10 metre air rifle standing SH2	30 August
Bronze	Franček Gorazd Tiršek	Shooting	Mixed R5 10 metre air rifle prone SH2	1 September

== Cycling ==
Slovenia sent one male cyclist after successfully getting a slot in the 2018 UCI Nations Ranking Allocation quota for the European.

== Shooting ==
Two Slovenian shooters will competed after qualified. They are shooters name is Franc Pinter (Men's 10m Air Rifle Standing SH1) & Franček Gorazd Tiršek (Mixed 10m Air Rifle Standing SH2).

== Swimming ==
One Slovenian swimmer has successfully entered the paralympic slot after breaking the MQS.
