= Fédération Internationale de Tir aux Armes Sportives de Chasse =

International sport federation for sport shooting

- Jurisdiction: International
- Abbreviation: FITASC
- Founded: 4 June 1921 (105 years ago)
- Headquarters: Paris, France
- Location: 10, Rue Mederic, 75017, Paris
- President: Jean François Palinkas

Official website
- www.fitasc.com

Fédération Internationale de Tir aux Armes Sportives de Chasse (FITASC, "International Shooting Federation of Hunting Sport Weapons") is an international sport federation for sport shooting, specifically clay pigeon shooting similar to sporting clays, trap and skeet.

== Rules ==
It involves strategically placed clay target throwers (called traps) set to simulate live game birds/animals- teal, rabbits, pheasant etc. Shooters on each layout or "parcour", shoot in turn at various combinations of single and double clay birds. Each station or "peg" on a parcour will have a menu card that lets the shooter know the sequence of clay birds he or she will be shooting at (i.e. which trap the clay bird will be coming from). The shooters will be presented with 4 or 5 two-shot singles which they will rotate through and then two pair. In Old Style FITASC there are three pegs on each parcour, with 25 shots to a parcour.

Typical targets are a rabbit, chandelle, overhead, trap (outgoing), crossing, teal (launched straight up into the air), and an incoming bird. The targets are shot as singles and as doubles (Double targets can be simultaneous, on report or trailing/following-"rafale" in FITASC terminology). All single targets may be attempted with two shots and are counted as killed with either shot, two shots may also be used to attempt doubles and either target or both may be shot with only those two shots. In other words, a shooter may attempt the first target in a double and upon missing, may continue to shoot that same target for score if broken even though the second target will be lost due to being missed in the double.

== Disciplines ==
There are six disciplines under the FITASC rule.

- Combined game Shooting
- Compak Sporting
- Helice
- Sporting
- Trap
- Universal trench

== Competitions ==
In 2019, with the edition held from 31 May to 2 June in Maribor in Slovenia, the European Championships of Universal Trench, organized by FITASC, reached the 47th edition.

FITASC organized also World and European Championships of helice shooting.

== Notable people ==
- Gebben Miles, professional clay pigeon shooter, won the 2012 FITASC World Championship.

== See also ==
- List of shooting sports organizations
