= Sidhartha Babu =

Indian sport shooter

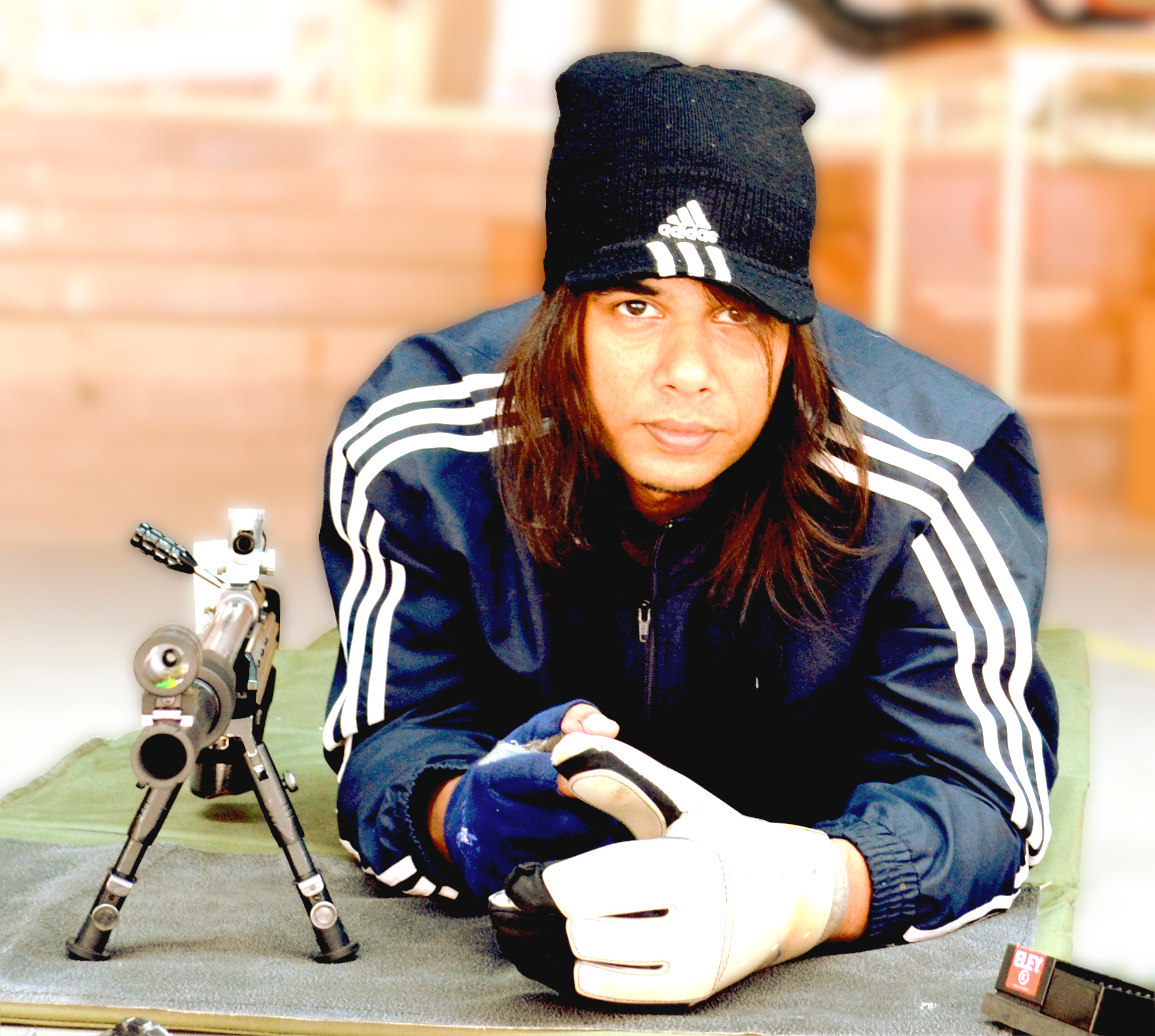

Personal information
- Born: Thiruvananthapuram, Kerala, India
- Education: Master of Computer Applications (MCA); College of Engineering, Trivandrum
- Years active: 2008-
- Other interests: Guitar, Painting, Stamp Collection, Fishing

Sport
- Country: India (IND)
- Sport: Shooting

Achievements and titles
- Paralympic finals: Qualified for 2020 Tokyo, 2024 Paris
- World finals: Won in 2021 (Bronze), 2017 (Bronze) Para Shooting Worldcups
- Regional finals: Won Gold Medal with games record in Asian Para Games 2022, South Indian 50-m Prone Rifle Shooting Champion
- National finals: Holds national record from 2014 in 50-m Prone Rifle Para Category

Sidhartha Babu is an Indian self-taught, international rifle shooter from Thiruvananthapuram, Kerala. He is currently based in Bengaluru, India. He has qualified for shooting at the 2024 Paris Paramlympics through the 2022 Asian Para Games conducted in Hangzhou, China (22-28 October 2023) with a record-breaking performance. Also, he had represented India in the 2020 Tokyo Paramlympics for Mixed 50m rifle prone SH1 through the performance in Para World Shooting Championship (12-18 October 2019) held in Sydney, Australia.

== Achievements ==
- Won Gold in Asian Para Games Hangzhou 2023 in Mixed 50m Rifle Prone SH-1 and also set the Asian Para Games Record
- Won Bronze in Al Ain 2021 World Shooting World Cup
- Won Bronze for India in 2017 Para Shooting Worldcup
- Holds national record from 2014 (broke it himself in 2017 and 2018) in 50-m Prone Rifle Para Category
- South Indian 50-m Prone Rifle Shooting Champion (competing against able-bodied athletes)
- Won hat trick gold medals in State Level 50-m Prone Rifle, Kerala State (2016, 2017 and 2018) against able-bodied athletes
