= Zandraagiin Ganbaatar =

Mongolian Paralympic sport shooter

Medal record
Representing Mongolia
Men's Shooting sport
Paralympic Games
| Bronze medal – third place | 2014 Asian Para Games | Men's shooting |

Zandraagiin Ganbaatar (Mongolian: Зандраагийн Ганбаатар) is a Mongolian Paralympic shooter. He began his career with July’s Worlds where he came seventh-place in Suhl, Germany. On July 7, 2014, he became a gold medal recipient for his participation at P4 Shooting tournament which was hosted at Fort Benning, Georgia. On October 20, 2014, he received his first bronze medal at the 2014 Asian Para Games in Incheon, South Korea. Currently he is a qualifier for the 2016 Summer Paralympics.
