= Rahul Jakhar =

Indian sport shooter (born 1986)

Rahul Jakhar (born 1986) is an Indian Para Pistol Shooter. He is currently World No 8 in Men's 10m Air Pistol SH1 (World Shooting Para Sport Rankings) and he also participated in the 2018 Asian Para Games P4 - Mixed 50M Free Pistol (SH1 Events).

== 2020 Summer Paralympics ==
He Qualify For Paralympics Games at Tokyo, Japan and now he will represent India Team at the Shooting Paralympic of the 2020 Summer Paralympics in Tokyo, Japan at Team Team.

== See also ==
- Paralympic Committee of India
- India at the Paralympics
