= Avani Lekhara =

Indian para rifle shooter

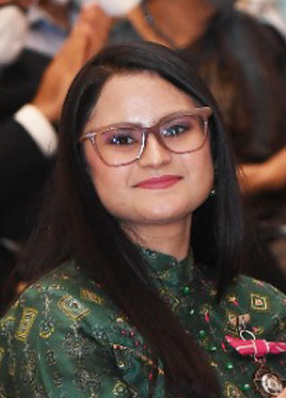
- Lekhara in 2022

Personal information
- Nationality: Indian
- Born: 8 November 2001 (age 24) Shastri Nagar, Jaipur, Rajasthan, India
- Years active: 2015–present
- Height: 5 ft 3 in (160 cm)
- Website: Twitter

Sport
- Country: India
- Sport: Shooting
- Disability: Paraplegia (spinal cord injury)
- Disability class: SH1
- Events: 10m air rifle standing SH1; 50m rifle 3 positions SH1
- Club: Rajasthan State Rifle Association
- Coached by: Subhash Rana, Suma Shirur

Achievements and titles
- Paralympic finals: 2024 Paris (gold); 2020 Tokyo (gold) (bronze)
- Highest world ranking: World No. 1 (SH1, 10m air rifle) 1
Medal record
Representing India
Women's shooting
Event	1st	2nd	3rd
Paralympic Games	2	0	1
Para World Cup	3	1	1
Asian Para Games	1	1	0
Total	6	2	2
Paralympic Games
Gold medal – first place	2020 Tokyo	10m air rifle SH1
Gold medal – first place	2024 Paris	10m air rifle SH1
Bronze medal – third place	2020 Tokyo	50m rifle 3 positions SH1
World Championships
Bronze medal – third place	2026 Changwon	10m air rifle SH1
Asian Para Games
Gold medal – first place	2022 Hangzhou	10 m air rifle
Silver medal – second place	2026 Aichi-Nagoya	10 m air rifle
Para World Cup
Gold medal – first place	2022 France	10m air rifle SH1
Gold medal – first place	2022 France	50m rifle 3 positions SH1
Gold medal – first place	2025 Al Ain	10m air rifle SH1
Silver medal – second place	2022 South Korea	10m air rifle SH1
Bronze medal – third place	2024 New Delhi	10m air rifle standing SH1

Avani Lekhara (born 8 November 2001) is an Indian para rifle shooter. Competing in the SH1 classification, she is India's first-ever female gold medallist at the Paralympic Games, winning the gold medal at the 2020 Tokyo Paralympics. She has also won the gold medal in the 2024 Paris Paralympics, becaming the first Indian woman to win back-to-back gold medals.

== Early life and education ==
Lekhara is from Jaipur, Rajasthan. A car accident in 2012, at the age of 11, left her with complete paraplegia. Her father encouraged her to join sports, training in archery but moving to shooting in which she found her true passion. She currently studies law in Rajasthan University, India. She was a student of Kendriya Vidyalaya 3 (Jaipur), where she received her first gold medal in regional match of shooting.

== Career ==
Lekhara began shooting in 2015, inspired by former Olympic champion Abhinav Bindra and has since won several national and international titles.

Lekhara won the gold medal in the women's 10m air rifle SH1 and a bronze medal in the 50m rifle 3 positions at the 2020 Summer Paralympics. She became the first Indian woman to win a Paralympic gold medal and set the paralympic record in the women's 10m air rifle SH1.

On 3 September 2021, she became the first Indian female Paralympian to win two medals in Paralympic history after claiming bronze in the women's 50m air rifle standing event.

In March 2024, she won a bronze medal at the World Cup in New Delhi, scoring 227.0 points.

At the 2024 Summer Paralympics in Paris, she won a gold in women's 10m air rifle standing SH1. She became the first Indian woman athlete to win three Paralympic medals.

== In popular culture ==
Lekhara was featured in the second season of Kalki Presents: My Indian Life, a podcast produced by the BBC World Service and hosted by actress Kalki Koechlin.

== Awards ==
- 2021 – Khel Ratna Award, highest sporting honour of India.
- 2021 – Best Female Debut – Paralympic Awards – International Paralympic Committee
- 2022 – Padma Shri

== See also ==
- Paralympic Committee of India
- India at the Paralympics
