= Andrea Liverani =

Italian Paralympic shooter (born 1990)

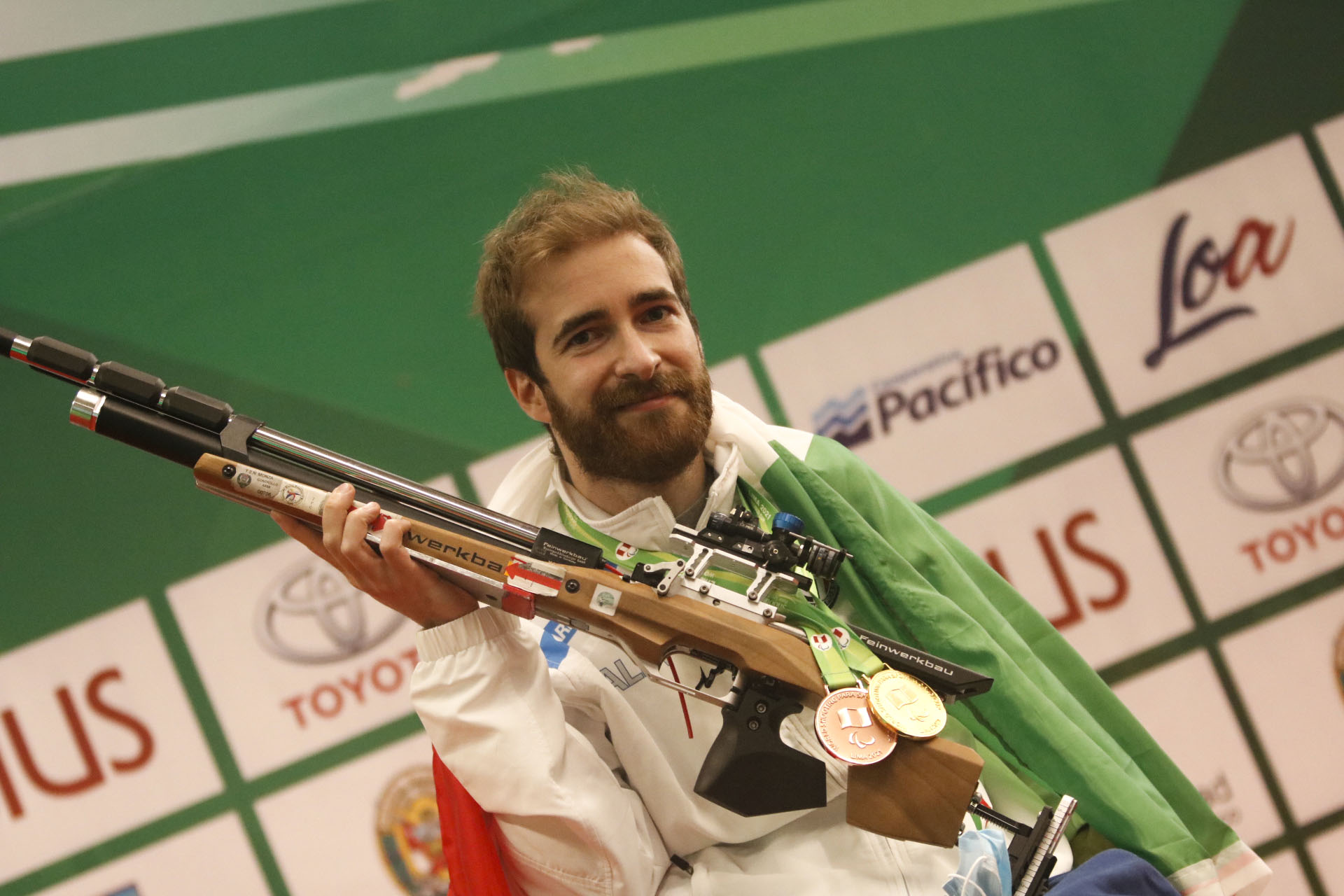
- Liverani in 2021

Personal information
- Born: 14 June 1990 (age 36) Milan, Italy

Sport
- Country: Italy
- Sport: Para shooting
- Disability class: SH2
- Event: R4, R5, R9
- Club: TSN Monza
- Coached by: Goldstain Ofir Haim
Medal record
Event	1st	2nd	3rd
Paralympic Games	0	0	1

Andrea Liverani (born 14 June 1990) is an Italian paralympic shooter who won a bronze medal at the 2020 Summer Paralympics, in Mixed R4 – 10 m air rifle standing SH2.

He played wheelchair basketball with the Briantea 84 team. He graduated from University of Milan-Bicocca.

In 2014, he joined the Italian Paralympic National Shooting team. He competed at the 2018 World Shooting Para Sport World Cup, and Lima 2021 World Cup, winning a gold medal.
