= Franček Gorazd Tiršek =

Slovenian sport shooter (born 1975)

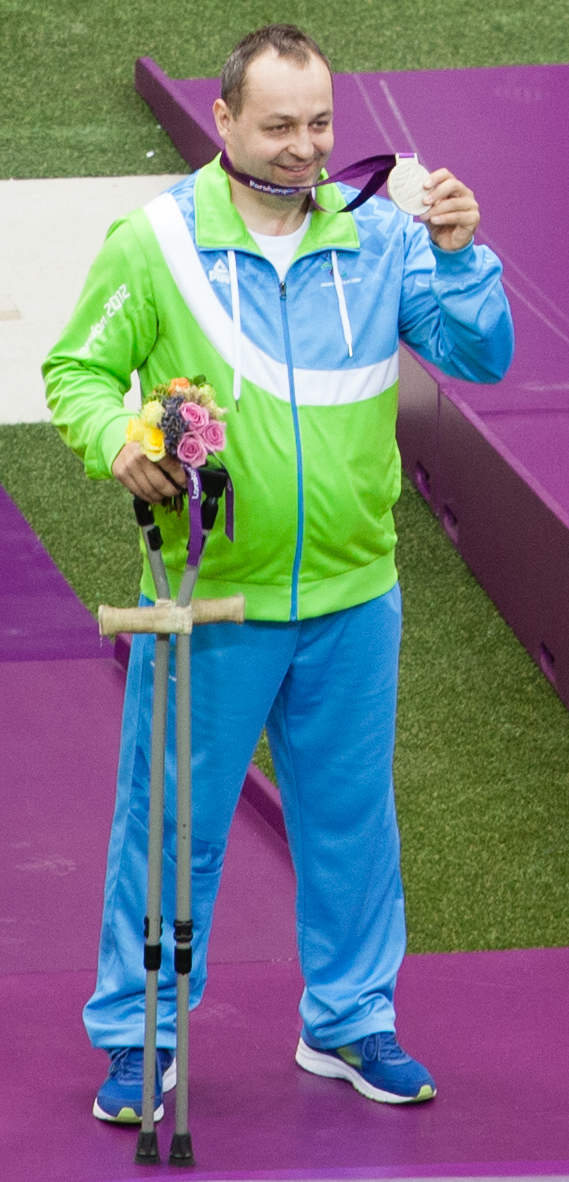
- Tiršek at the 2012 Summer Paralympics Mixed R4-10m Air Rifle Standing-SH2 medal ceremony

Personal information
- Born: 28 March 1975 (age 51) Celje, Slovenia

Sport
- Country: Slovenia
- Sport: Shooting para sport
- Disability class: SH2
Medal record
Men's shooting para sport
Representing Slovenia
Paralympic Games
Gold medal – first place	2024 Paris	Mixed 10 m air rifle standing SH2
Silver medal – second place	2012 London	Mixed 10 m air rifle standing SH2
Silver medal – second place	2016 Rio de Janeiro	10 m air rifle standing SH2
Silver medal – second place	2020 Tokyo	10 m air rifle standing SH2
Bronze medal – third place	2020 Tokyo	10 m air rifle prone SH2
European Para Championships
Gold medal – first place	2023 Rotterdam	Mixed 10 m air rifle standing SH2

Franček Gorazd Tiršek (born 28 March 1975) is a Slovenian sport shooter who has won one gold, three silver, and one bronze medal at the Paralympic Games.

== Career ==
Tiršek became a tetraplegic in a car accident in 2003. Prior to the accident, he competed in hunting rifle shooting. At the age of 32, he started practicing para-shooting. In this sport, Tiršek competes in the SH2 category in the following disciplines: R4 Mixed 10 metre air rifle standing SH2, R5 Mixed 10 metre rifle prone SH2, and R9 Mixed 50 metre rifle prone SH2. Tiršek uses his left hand for shooting.

At the Summer Paralympic Games, Tiršek has represented Slovenia three times, at the 2012 Summer Paralympics in London, at the 2016 Summer Paralympics in Rio de Janeiro, and at the 2020 Summer Paralympics in Tokyo. Each time, he has won a silver medal in the R4 discipline. In addition, he finished 7th in R5 in 2016. He was also the flagbearer for Slovenia at the opening ceremony in Rio in 2016. The medal that Tiršek won in Tokyo was the 50th medal for Slovenia at the Paralympic Games, taking into account the medals that the athletes won when Slovenia was part of Yugoslavia. He is coached by Polonca Sladič, who has coached para-shooters for several Paralympics, and coached Živa Dvoršak at the 2020 Summer Olympics. After the R4 competition, Sladič stated that Tiršek was almost too late for the 11th shot, but he managed to shoot in time. Tiršek stated that he could have aimed for gold if he had more shots available. Later in Tokyo, Tiršek won a bronze medal in the R5 event.

For his achievements in para-sports, Tiršek has received several awards and recognitions. He was named Male Athlete of the Year by the Paralympic Sports Federation of Slovenia and the Paralympic Committee of Slovenia in 2012, 2014, 2015, and 2016. He was also named Para Athlete of the Year in 2013 and 2014.
