= Oleksii Denysiuk =

Ukrainian paralympic sport shooter

Sport
- Country: Ukraine
- Sport: Paralympic shooting
Medal record
Representing Ukraine
Paralympic Games
Mixed shooting para sport
Bronze medal – third place	2016 Rio de Janeiro	Mixed 50 m pistol
Bronze medal – third place	2020 Tokyo	Mixed 25 m pistol
European Para Championships
Bronze medal – third place	2023 Rotterdam	10 m air pistol SH1

Oleksii Denysiuk is a Ukrainian paralympic sport shooter.

== Career ==
He competed in the Shooting at the 2016 Summer Paralympics, winning the bronze medal in the mixed 50m pistol event. Denysiuk also competed at the 2020 Summer Paralympics, winning the bronze medal in the mixed 25m pistol event.
