= Iryna Shchetnik =

Ukrainian Paralympic sport shooter

Personal information
- Born: 31 October 1999 (age 26)

Sport
- Country: Ukraine
- Sport: Sport shooting
Medal record
Representing Ukraine
Women's shooting
Paralympic Games
Bronze medal – third place	2020 Tokyo	10 m air rifle SH1
Bronze medal – third place	2020 Tokyo	Mixed R3 – 10 m air rifle prone SH1
European Para Championships
Gold medal – first place	2023 Rotterdam	10 m air rifle standing SH1

Iryna Shchetnik (born 31 October 1999) is a Ukrainian Paralympic sport shooter. She won the bronze medal in the women's 10-metre air rifle standing SH1 event at the 2020 Summer Paralympics held in Tokyo, Japan.
