= Joackim Norberg =

Swedish Paralympic shooter

Joachim Norberg
Personal information
- Nationality: Swedish
- Born: July 31, 1968 (age 57)

Sport
- Disability class: SH1
Medal record
Representing Sweden
Paralympic Games
Silver medal – second place	2016 Rio	SH1 25 metre pistol
- Updated on 11 September 2016

Joachim Norberg (born 31 July 1968) is a Swedish shooter. He competes in the SH1 disability class.

Norberg won a silver medal at the 2016 Summer Paralympics in the 25 metre pistol.
