= Issy Bailey =

British paralympic sports shooter (born 1994)

Issy Bailey PLY
Personal information
- Born: 19 April 1994 (age 32)
- Education: Rendcomb College, University of Exeter

Sport
- Country: United Kingdom
- Sport: Shooting
- Events: 10 metre air pistol; 25 metre pistol
- Retired: 2025

Issy Bailey (born 19 April 1994) is a British paralympic sports shooter. She competed in Rio at the 2016 Summer Paralympics and at the 2020 Summer Paralympics in Tokyo.

== Life ==
Bailey was born in 1994, and was brought up in Somerford Keynes, Gloucestershire. She attended nearby Rendcomb College, where she first tried shooting. As her first sport was hockey, when she played lacrosse for her school she would usually move the ball on the ground rather than in the air. In 2013, when she was 19 and attending the University of Exeter, she was seriously injured in a car accident. Bailey was taken to hospital and placed in a five-day coma while doctors treated her damaged spine, broken back, liver, and ribs. She lost the use of her legs and the full use of her left hand.

While she was recovering at Stoke Mandeville Hospital, she was offered several sports, but had so many injuries to her body that shooting seemed to be the best option. She took to the sport and joined the Great Britain squad in 2014. Her studies at Exeter continued a year later than planned and she graduated with a degree in English. She later took up wheelchair rugby and wheelchair basketball and earned a master's degree in "Global Literatures and Cultures" at Exeter in 2021.

Bailey did not qualify for the 2016 Summer Paralympics in Rio but was given a wildcard, so she attended the event along with her friend and fellow pistol shooter Stewart Nangle. She did not win a medal but instead finished in 14th place in the Women's 10 metre air pistol SH1. Stewart Nangle retired in 2018 leaving Bailey as the only pistol shooter on the British team.

When the teams were announced for the postponed 2020 Summer Paralympics in Tokyo, Bailey was included after her ninth-place finish in Sydney at the 2019 World Championships. She was the only British woman pistol shooter at that year's Paralympics. She competed in the 10m air pistol SH1 and mixed 25m pistol SH1. She narrowly missed out on making the finals despite a personal best performance.
