= Shooting at the 2020 Summer Paralympics =

Shooting at the XVI Paralympic Games
- Shooting pictogram of the 2020 Summer Paralympics
- Venue: Asaka Shooting Range
- Dates: 30 August - 5 September 2021
- Competitors: 154

Shooting at the 2020 Summer Paralympics was held at the Asaka Shooting Range.

The 2020 Summer Olympic and Paralympic Games were postponed to 2021 due to the COVID-19 pandemic. They kept the 2020 name and were held from 24 August to 5 September 2021.

== Medal table ==
Rank	NPC	Gold	Silver	Bronze	Total
1	China	4	2	0	6
2	Serbia	2	2	0	4
3	India	2	1	2	5
4	Germany	1	1	0	2
4	Sweden	1	1	0	2
6	Iran	1	0	0	1
6	Slovakia	1	0	0	1
6	United Arab Emirates	1	0	0	1
9	Ukraine	0	2	4	6
10	South Korea	0	1	2	3
11	Slovenia	0	1	1	2
12	Poland	0	1	0	1
12	Turkey	0	1	0	1
14	Hungary	0	0	1	1
14	Italy	0	0	1	1
14	RPC	0	0	1	1
14	Spain	0	0	1	1
Totals (17 entries)		13	13	13	39

== Medalists ==
=== Men ===
Event	Class	Gold	Silver	Bronze
R1 10 m air rifle standing	SH1	Dong Chao; China	Andrii Doroshenko; Ukraine	Park Jin-ho; South Korea
R7 50 m rifle 3 positions	SH1	Abdulla Sultan Alaryani; United Arab Emirates	Laslo Šuranji; Serbia	Shim Young-jip; South Korea
P1 10 m air pistol	SH1	Yang Chao; China	Huang Xing; China	Singhraj Adhana; India

=== Women ===
Event	Class	Gold	Silver	Bronze
R2 10 m air rifle standing	SH1	Avani Lekhara; India	Zhang Cuiping; China	Iryna Shchetnik; Ukraine
R8 50 m rifle 3 positions	SH1	Zhang Cuiping; China	Natascha Hiltrop; Germany	Avani Lekhara; India
P2 10 m air pistol	SH1	Sareh Javanmardi; Iran	Ayşegül Pehlivanlar; Turkey	Krisztina Dávid; Hungary

=== Mixed ===
Event	Class	Gold	Silver	Bronze
R3 10 m air rifle prone	SH1	Natascha Hiltrop; Germany	Park Jin-ho; South Korea	Iryna Shchetnik; Ukraine
R6 50 m rifle prone	SH1	Veronika Vadovičová; Slovakia	Anna Normann; Sweden	Juan Saavedra; Spain
P3 25 m pistol	SH1	Huang Xing; China	Szymon Sowiński; Poland	Oleksii Denysiuk; Ukraine
P4 50 m pistol	SH1	Manish Narwal; India	Singhraj Adhana; India	Sergey Malyshev; RPC
R4 10 m air rifle standing	SH2	Philip Jönsson; Sweden	Franček Gorazd Tiršek; Slovenia	Andrea Liverani; Italy
R5 10 m air rifle prone	SH2	Dragan Ristić; Serbia	Vasyl Kovalchuk; Ukraine	Franček Gorazd Tiršek; Slovenia
R9 50 m rifle prone	SH2	Dragan Ristić; Serbia	Zdravko Savanović; Serbia	Vasyl Kovalchuk; Ukraine

== See also ==
- Paralympic shooting
- Shooting at the 2020 Summer Olympics
