= Shooting at the 2012 Summer Paralympics – Mixed 50 metre rifle prone SH1 =

Sporting event in England

Mixed 50 metre rifle prone SH1 at the XIV Paralympic Games
- Venue: Royal Artillery Barracks
- Dates: 4 September 2012
- Competitors: 48 from 29 nations

Medalists
1st place, gold medalist(s)		Abdullah Sultan Alaryani; United Arab Emirates
2nd place, silver medalist(s)		Juan Antonio Saavedra Reinaldo; Spain
3rd place, bronze medalist(s)		Matthew Skelhon; Great Britain

The Mixed 50 metre rifle prone SH1 event at the 2012 Summer Paralympics took place on 4 September at the Royal Artillery Barracks in Woolwich.

The event consists of two rounds: a qualifier and a final. In the qualifier, each shooter fires 60 shots with a rifle at 50 metres distance from the prone position. Scores for each shot are in increments of 1, with a maximum score of 10.

The top 8 shooters in the qualifying round move on to the final round. There, they fire an additional 10 shots. These shots score in increments of .1, with a maximum score of 10.9. The total score from all 70 shots is used to determine final ranking.

== Qualification round ==
Rank	Athlete	Country	M/W	1	2	3	4	5	6	Total	Notes
1	Abdullah Sultan Alaryani	United Arab Emirates	M	99	99	97	99	100	98	592	Q
2	Jonas Jacobsson	Sweden	M	98	100	98	98	97	100	591	Q
3	Juan Antonio Saavedra Reinaldo	Spain	M	97	99	99	98	99	98	590	Q
4	Sim Jae Yong	South Korea	M	99	99	99	98	99	95	589	Q
5	Doron Shaziri	Israel	M	98	98	98	97	98	100	589	Q
6	Radoslav Malenovsky	Slovakia	M	97	99	100	98	96	99	589	Q
7	Matthew Skelhon	Great Britain	M	94	99	97	100	99	100	589	Q
8	Shim Youngjip	South Korea	M	98	98	99	96	99	99	589	Q
9	Dong Chao	China	M	99	97	100	96	96	100	588	
10	Sergey Nochevnoy	Russia	M	100	98	99	98	97	96	588	
11	Cédric Fèvre-Chevalier	France	M	96	98	97	99	99	98	587	
12	Joshua Olson	United States	M	98	98	100	95	100	96	587	
13	Jan Schaub	Germany	M	96	99	96	97	99	100	587	
14	Fredrik Larsson	Sweden	M	96	98	98	99	98	97	586	
15	Zhang Cuiping	China	W	95	97	99	99	99	97	586	
16	Tatiana Ryabchenko	Russia	W	98	97	96	99	99	97	586	
17	Jozef Siroky	Slovakia	M	98	97	98	97	98	98	586	
18	Sean Baldwin	Ireland	M	99	96	96	98	99	97	585	
19	Carlos Garletti	Brazil	M	97	98	98	96	97	97	583	
20	Ashley Phillip Adams	Australia	M	96	95	99	97	98	98	583	
21	Veli Veikko Palsamaki	Finland	M	96	97	97	97	96	99	582	
22	Aki Taguchi	Japan	W	95	99	96	97	96	98	581	
23	Karen Butler	Great Britain	W	95	98	98	97	98	95	581	
24	Dang Shibei	China	W	98	95	95	98	98	97	581	
25	Natascha Hiltrop	Germany	W	98	96	95	98	97	96	580	
26	Azzurra Ciani	Italy	W	97	98	92	96	98	99	580	
27	Phiraphong Buengbok	Thailand	M	95	98	94	98	97	98	580	
28	Obaid Aldahmani	United Arab Emirates	M	99	95	98	97	94	96	579	
29	Veronika Vadovičová	Slovakia	W	96	93	98	99	95	98	579	
30	Lee Yunri	South Korea	W	93	97	96	97	98	97	578	
31	Franc Pinter	Slovenia	M	95	93	97	98	97	97	577	
32	Jacopo Cappelli	Italy	M	98	96	99	96	93	95	577	
33	Liu Wen-chang	Chinese Taipei	M	96	95	98	97	95	95	576	
34	Savas Ustun	Turkey	M	94	97	95	95	98	97	576	
35	Paul Aksel Johansen	Norway	M	96	98	95	94	95	98	576	
36	Naresh Kumar Sharma	India	M	97	97	94	93	98	96	575	
37	Mala Sihabandit	Thailand	M	99	97	95	92	96	96	575	
38	Andrii Doroshenko	Ukraine	M	99	94	95	96	95	96	575	
39	Iurii Stoiev	Ukraine	M	97	95	98	94	97	94	575	
40	Josef Neumaier	Germany	M	97	97	98	95	93	94	574	
41	Christos Trifonidis	Canada	M	96	96	92	97	96	96	573	
42	Jolanta Szulc	Poland	W	93	95	95	95	98	95	571	
43	Delphine Fischer	France	W	97	92	95	97	95	94	570	
44	Miquel Orobitg Guitart	Spain	M	97	95	99	92	90	95	568	
45	Laslo Suranji	Serbia	M	96	97	94	92	92	96	567	
46	Berit Gejl	Denmark	W	97	95	90	94	97	94	567	
47	Benjamin Jesson	Great Britain	M	96	95	90	96	94	95	566	
48	Lotta Helsinger	Sweden	W	96	91	93	95	92	93	560	

== Final ==
Rank	Athlete	Country	M/W	Qual	1	2	3	4	5	6	7	8	9	10	Final	Total
1st place, gold medalist(s)	Abdullah Sultan Alaryani	United Arab Emirates	M	592	10.6	10.5	10.3	9.5	10.6	10.1	9.9	10.5	10.2	10.6	102.8	694.8
2nd place, silver medalist(s)	Juan Antonio Saavedra Reinaldo	Spain	M	590	10.2	10.9	10.2	10.4	10.6	10.6	10.4	10.5	10.7	10.1	104.6	694.6
3rd place, bronze medalist(s)	Matthew Skelhon	Great Britain	M	589	10.2	10.7	10.8	10.4	10.6	10.5	10.1	10.3	10.2	10.4	104.2	693.2
4	Jonas Jacobsson	Sweden	M	591	9.8	10.7	10.0	9.8	9.3	10.2	10.0	10.8	10.4	10.2	101.2	692.2
5	Sim Jae Yong	South Korea	M	589	10.4	10.0	10.5	10.3	10.4	9.7	10.6	10.2	10.3	10.7	103.1	692.1
6	Doron Shaziri	Israel	M	589	10.3	10.5	10.7	10.1	10.3	10.5	10.3	10.0	10.4	9.7	102.8	691.8
7	Radoslav Malenovsky	Slovakia	M	589	10.3	9.3	10.1	10.3	9.9	10.4	10.1	10.1	10.9	10.3	101.7	690.7
8	Shim Youngjip	South Korea	M	589	9.2	10.4	10.3	9.9	10.1	9.6	10.2	10.4	10.0	9.6	99.7	688.7
