= United Arab Emirates at the Paralympics =

- Flag of the United Arab Emirates
- IPC code: UAE
- NPC: UAE Paralympic Committee
- Medals: Gold 5 Silver 11 Bronze 6 Total 22

Summer appearances
- 1992; 1996; 2000; 2004; 2008; 2012; 2016; 2020; 2024

The United Arab Emirates started actively participating in the Paralympic community during the 1990s. They made their debut at the 1992 Summer Paralympics. Since that time, they have won several Paralympic medals. The country had their debut on the international Paralympic stage at the 1990 Stoke Mandeville Games. Some of the country's Paralympic competitors are internationally ranked. The United Arab Emirates have competed at several other Paralympic events including the Arab Paralympic Games, Asian Paralympic Games, IWAS World Games, Stoke Mandeville Games, and World Semi-Olympic Championship. (The country has never participated at the Winter Paralympic Games.) The United Arab Emirates Paralympic Committee is the national organisation, gaining its International Paralympic Committee recognition in 1995 and have subsequently made winning medals and hosting events a priority.

== Summer Paralympics ==
The country made their Paralympic Games début at the 1992 Summer Paralympics in Barcelona, by sending only one athlete (Ali Saif), in weightlifting. The country has competed in every edition of the Summer Paralympics since then, and Emirati Paralympians have won a total of nine medals: one gold, five silver, and three bronze. Until 2008, Emirati competitors were all men, and entered only athletics and weightlifting/powerlifting. At the 2008 Games, however, the country entered its first female competitor, Thuraya Alzaabi, in discus and javelin after previous having refused to allow women to represent the country at the Paralympic Games. 2008 also saw an Emirati, Abulla Al Aryani, compete in shooting - the first time the country had entered a competitor in any sport other than weightlifting/powerlifting or track and field.

== Medal tallies ==
=== Summer Paralympics ===
Event	Gold	Silver	Bronze	Total	Ranking
1992 Summer Paralympics	0	0	0	0	—
1996 Summer Paralympics	0	0	0	0	—
2000 Summer Paralympics	0	3	1	4	52nd
2004 Summer Paralympics	1	1	2	4	51st
2008 Summer Paralympics	0	1	0	1	63rd
2012 Summer Paralympics	1	1	1	3	46th
2016 Summer Paralympics	2	4	1	7	38th
2020 Summer Paralympics	1	1	1	3	54th
2024 Summer Paralympics	0	0	0	0	—
Total	5	11	6	22	

== Medalists ==
Medal	Name	Games	Sport	Event
Gold	Mohammed Khamis Khalaf	2004 Athens	Powerlifting	Men's -82.5 kg
Gold	Abdullah Sultan Alaryani	2012 London	Shooting	Mixed 50m rifle prone SH1
Gold	Mohamed Alhammadi	2016 Rio de Janeiro	Athletics	Men's 800m T34
Gold	Mohammed Khamis Khalaf	2016 Rio de Janeiro	Powerlifting	Men's -88kg
Gold	Abdullah Sultan Alaryani	2020 Tokyo	Shooting	Men's 50 metre rifle 3 positions SH1
Silver	Ahmed Saif Zaal Abu Muhair	2000 Sydney	Athletics	Men's 400m T36
Silver	Naseib Obaid Sebait Araidat	2000 Sydney	Athletics	Men's 400m T52
Silver	Humaid Hassan Murad Eisa	2000 Sydney	Athletics	Men's javelin F52
Silver	Mana Abdulla Sulaiman	2004 Athens	Athletics	Men's shot put F32
Silver	Mohammed Khamis Khalaf	2008 Beijing	Powerlifting	Men's -90 kg
Silver	Mohamed Hammadi	2012 London	Athletics	Men's 200m T34
Silver	Noura Alktebi	2016 Rio de Janeiro	Athletics	Women's shot put F32
Silver	Abdullah Sultan Alaryani	2016 Rio de Janeiro	Shooting	Men's 10m air rifle standing SH1
Silver	Abdullah Sultan Alaryani	2016 Rio de Janeiro	Shooting	Men's 50m rifle 3 positions SH1
Silver	Abdullah Sultan Alaryani	2016 Rio de Janeiro	Shooting	Mixed 50m rifle prone SH1
Silver	Mohamed Alhammadi	2020 Tokyo	Athletics	Men's 800m T34
Bronze	Ahmed Saif Zaal Abu Muhair	2000 Sydney	Athletics	Men's 200m T36
Bronze	Ali Qambar Ali Ansari	2004 Athens	Athletics	Men's 400m T37
Bronze	Mohammad Bin Dabbas	2004 Athens	Athletics	Men's discus F33-34
Bronze	Mohamed Hammadi	2012 London	Athletics	Men's 100m T34
Bronze	Sara Al Senaani	2016 Rio de Janeiro	Athletics	Women's shot put F33
Bronze	Mohamed Alhammadi	2020 Tokyo	Athletics	Men's 100m T34

== United Arab Emirates Paralympic Committee ==
The country's membership was pending at the 1993 International Paralympic Committee General Assembly in Berlin, Germany. The country became a full member of the International Paralympic Committee in 1995, when their membership was ratified at the 1995 International Paralympic Committee General Assembly in Tokyo, Japan. Other countries that were accepted at that session alongside the United Arab Emirates included Kazakhstan, Bermuda, Ukraine, Ivory Coast, Former Yugoslavia, the Kyrgyz Republic, Qatar, Macedonia, Saudi Arabia, Angola and Bosnia Herzegovina. In 2008, Mohammed Mohammed Fadel Al Hameli because the chairman of the United Arab Emirates Paralympics Committee at a time when the organisation had a new board installed. The new leadership made it a priority to improve sporting facilities accessible for disabled athletes in the country as part of the country's preparations for sending their athletes to the 2012 Summer Paralympics. The Committee decided to focus on developing athletes in the following sports: shooting, powerlifting, and wheelchair racing.

In 2010, the country hosted an international forum on Sports for People with a Disability. Participation and hosting of this event was inspiration for the country in trying to host an international Paralympic event. The country is a member of the Asian Paralympic Committee, in the West Asia Sub Region.

== Athletes ==
Athletes from the country have greatly improve since they first began competing in the Games, some of whom are currently internationally ranked. Amongst those are Mohammad Vahdani who is ranked fourth, Jasim Alnaqbi seventeenth and Mahmood Albalooshi who is ranked seventy-seventh in the Men's 100 m T54 event. In the Women's 100 m T54 event, Patricia Keller is ranked nineteenth, and Andrea von Bueren is ranked twenty-fourth

== Events ==
=== Arab Paralympic Games ===
The country took part in the 1999 Arab Paralympic Games held in Amman, Jordan. They won four gold medals, three silver medals and five bronze medals at the event, ranking tenth in total medal count amongst sixteen countries competing.

=== Asian Paralympic Games ===
The nation participated in the Asian Paralympic Games in 2010 in Guangzhou. Malaleih Hassan won a gold in the shot put event. Alzaabi Thuraya, Alzarouni Mohamed and Alaryani Abdulla Sultan also competed at the Games.

=== IWAS World Games ===
In December 2011, the country will host the IWAS World Games, the games that succeeded the Stoke Mandeville Games.

=== Stoke Mandeville Games ===
The United Arab Emirates competed at their first major disabled sport competition in 1990 when they participated in the Stoke Mandeville Games. They won a gold medal, and silver and bronze medals at the games. They sent five athletes to the games, powerlifters and table tennis players.

=== Winter Paralympics ===
The United Arab Emirates have never taken part in the Winter Paralympics.

=== World Semi-Olympic Championship ===
In 1998, the country participated in the World Semi-Olympic Championship in the United Kingdom. The United Arab Emirates won two gold medals, two silver medals and five bronze medals at the event.

== Sports Clubs ==
There are several sport clubs for disabled athletes in the United Arab Emirates. They are the Abu Dhabi Disabled Sports Club, Alain Disabled Sports Club, Dubai Club for Special Sports, Althiqah Club for the Disabled and the Khor- fakkan Club for the Disabled. These clubs are important to the country in terms of developing Paralympic competitors for the nation.

== See also ==
- United Arab Emirates at the Olympics
