= Shooting at the 2012 Summer Paralympics – Men's 10 metre air rifle standing SH1 =

Men's 10 metre air rifle standing SH1 at the XIV Paralympic Games
- Venue: Royal Artillery Barracks
- Dates: 31 August
- Competitors: 29 from 20 nations

Medalists
1st place, gold medalist(s)		Dong Chao	China
2nd place, silver medalist(s)		Jonas Jacobsson	Sweden
3rd place, bronze medalist(s)		Josef Neumaier	Germany

The Men's 10 metre air rifle standing SH1 event at the 2012 Summer Paralympics took place on 31 August at the Royal Artillery Barracks in Woolwich.

The event consisted of two rounds: a qualifier and a final. In the qualifier, each shooter fired 60 shots with an air rifle at 10 metres distance from the "standing" (interpreted to include seated in wheelchairs) position. Scores for each shot were in increments of 1, with a maximum score of 10.

The top 8 shooters in the qualifying round moved on to the final round. There, they fired an additional 10 shots. These shots scored in increments of .1, with a maximum score of 10.9. The total score from all 70 shots were used to determine the final ranking.

== Qualification round ==
Rank	Athlete	Country	1	2	3	4	5	6	Total	Notes
1	Dong Chao	China	98	99	100	100	100	99	596	Q, EWR, EPR
2	Josef Neumaier	Germany	98	99	99	99	99	100	594	Q
3	Jonas Jacobsson	Sweden	99	98	99	100	99	98	593	Q
4	Shim Young-jip	South Korea	98	99	99	98	99	100	593	Q
5	Lee Seung-Chul	South Korea	98	98	100	98	99	98	591	Q
6	Iurii Stoiev	Ukraine	100	98	97	97	99	100	591	Q
7	Franc Pinter	Slovenia	97	98	98	99	98	100	590	Q
8	Abdulla Sultan Alaryani	United Arab Emirates	99	98	97	98	98	99	589	Q, QS:51.6
9	Dingchao Gou	China	99	98	95	98	100	99	589	QS: 50.7
10	Nathan Milgate	Great Britain	96	99	97	99	97	100	588	
11	Hakan Gustafsson	Sweden	99	99	96	98	99	97	588	
12	Norbert Gau	Germany	98	96	99	100	99	96	588	
13	Obaid Aldahmani	United Arab Emirates	97	97	97	99	98	99	587	
14	Jae Yong Sim	South Korea	97	97	96	98	98	97	583	
15	Ashley Philip Adams	Australia	95	99	98	95	100	96	583	
16	Phiraphong Buengbok	Thailand	97	97	99	95	97	95	580	
17	Laslo Suranji	Serbia	97	96	97	96	98	96	580	
18	Matthew Skelhon	Great Britain	96	97	97	98	94	97	579	
19	Jacopo Cappelli	Italy	95	95	98	96	97	97	578	
20	Andrii Doroshenko	Ukraine	96	97	94	98	96	97	578	
21	Wen-chang Liu	Chinese Taipei	97	91	97	95	100	96	576	
22	Fredrik Larsson	Sweden	94	96	98	97	95	93	573	
23	Savas Ustun	Turkey	93	96	96	96	95	97	573	
24	Naresh Kumar Sharma	India	94	96	97	93	98	93	571	
25	Radoslav Malenovsky	Slovakia	93	96	95	96	94	94	568	
26	Carlos Garletti	Brazil	94	94	93	94	94	94	563	
27	Miquel Orobitg Guitart	Spain	91	91	93	92	94	94	555	
28	Jozef Siroky	Slovakia	96	91	88	94	91	94	554	
29	Sean Baldwin	Ireland	91	93	93	92	91	93	553	

Q – Qualified for final

== Final ==
Rank	Athlete	Country	Qual	1	2	3	4	5	6	7	8	9	10	Final	Total
1	Dong Chao	China	596	9.5	10.2	10.0	10.7	10.4	10.9	10.3	10.9	10.6	10.0	103.5	699.5
2	Jonas Jacobsson	Sweden	593	10.4	10.4	10.4	10.3	9.9	9.9	10.5	10.8	10.3	10.6	103.5	696.5
3	Josef Neumaier	Germany	594	9.4	10.8	10.7	9.8	10.5	10.4	8.5	9.8	9.4	10.1	99.4	693.4
4	Lee Seung-Chul	South Korea	591	10.5	10.2	10.2	10.9	10.2	9.7	9.9	10.2	10.0	10.6	102.4	693.4
5	Shim Young-Jip	South Korea	593	10.4	9.4	10.4	10.5	9.9	10.0	9.5	10.5	10.2	9.1	99.9	692.9
6	Iurii Stoiev	Ukraine	591	10.6	10.1	10.3	10.3	10.4	10.4	10.2	9.7	9.9	9.0	100.9	691.9
7	Abdulla Sultan Alaryani	United Arab Emirates	589	10.5	9.7	10.4	10.5	10.2	10.3	9.7	10.3	10.6	10.6	102.8	691.8
8	Franc Pinter	Slovenia	590	9.7	10.8	9.3	10.0	9.2	10.3	10.3	9.5	9.7	10.1	98.9	688.9
