= Athletics at the 2000 Summer Paralympics – Men's 100 metres T52 =

Men's 100 metres T52 at the XI Paralympic Games
- Venue: Stadium Australia
- Competitors: 10 from 7 nations
- Winning time: 17.82

Medalists
1st place, gold medalist(s)		Paul Nitz	United States
2nd place, silver medalist(s)		Salvador Hernandez Mondragon	Mexico
3rd place, bronze medalist(s)		Andre Beaudoin	Canada

The men's 100 metres T52 took place in Stadium Australia.

There were two heats and one final round. The T52 is for athletes who have good function in their arms and hand but no function in their trunks and legs, have a spinal cord injury or similar disabilities.

== Heats ==
Qualified for final round

=== Heat 1 ===
Rank	Athlete	Time	Notes
1	Paul Nitz (USA)	17.65	
2	Salvador Hernandez Mondragon (MEX)	18.11	
3	Dean Bergeron (CAN)	18.20	
4	Joseph Radmore (CAN)	18.74	
5	Lachlan Jones (AUS)	18.85	

=== Heat 2 ===
Rank	Athlete	Time	Notes
1	Andre Beaudoin (CAN)	17.84	
2	Ian Rice (USA)	18.45	
3	Masaaki Chiba (JPN)	18.71	
4	Naseib Obaid Sebait Araidat (UAE)	18.82	
5	Beat Bösch (SUI)	18.82	

== Final round ==
Rank	Athlete	Time	Notes
1st place, gold medalist(s)	Paul Nitz (USA)	17.82	
2nd place, silver medalist(s)	Salvador Hernandez Mondragon (MEX)	17.91	
3rd place, bronze medalist(s)	Andre Beaudoin (CAN)	18.30	
4	Naseib Obaid Sebait Araidat (UAE)	18.84	
5	Dean Bergeron (CAN)	19.21	
6	Joseph Radmore (CAN)	19.27	
7	Masaaki Chiba (JPN)	19.40	
	Ian Rice (USA)		DQ
