= Shooting at the 2012 Summer Paralympics – Men's 50 metre rifle 3 positions SH1 =

Men's 50 metre rifle 3 positions SH1 at the XIV Paralympic Games
- Venue: Royal Artillery Barracks
- Dates: 5 September 2012
- Competitors: 26 from 19 nations

Medalists
1st place, gold medalist(s)		Jonas Jacobsson	Sweden
2nd place, silver medalist(s)		Doron Shaziri	Israel
3rd place, bronze medalist(s)		Dong Chao	China

The Men's 50 metre rifle 3 positions SH1 event at the 2012 Summer Paralympics took place on 5 September at the Royal Artillery Barracks in Woolwich.

The event consisted of two rounds: a qualifier and a final. In the qualifier, each shooter fired 40 shots with a rifle at 50 metres distance from each of the prone, "standing" and kneeling positions. Scores for each shot were in increments of 1, with a maximum score of 10.

The top 8 shooters in the qualifying round moved on to the final round. There, they fired an additional 10 shots in the standing position. These shots scored in increments of .1, with a maximum score of 10.9. The total score from all 130 shots were used to determine the final ranking.

== Qualification round ==
Rank	Athlete	Country	Prone	Standing	Kneeling	Total	Notes
1	Doron Shaziri	Israel	392	380	385	1157	Q
2	Jonas Jacobsson	Sweden	380	384	391	1155	Q
3	Dong Chao	China	388	380	384	1152	Q
4	Shim Youngjip	South Korea	385	385	378	1148	Q
5	Sim Jae Yong	South Korea	383	374	379	1136	Q
6	Abdulla Sultan Alaryani	United Arab Emirates	383	380	371	1134	Q
7	Cedric Fevre	France	392	362	379	1133	Q
8	Obaid Aldahmani	United Arab Emirates	387	370	375	1132	Q
9	Radoslav Malenovsky	Slovakia	390	356	383	1129	
10	Ashley Phillip Adams	Australia	385	369	373	1127	
11	Franc Pinter	Slovenia	380	370	377	1127	
12	Gou Dingchao	China	379	375	372	1126	
13	Josef Neumaier	Germany	378	362	384	1124	
14	Andrii Doroshenko	Ukraine	384	374	364	1122	
15	Carlos Garletti	Brazil	388	361	373	1122	
16	Norbert Gau	Germany	364	368	383	1115	
17	Sean Baldwin	Ireland	385	352	375	1112	
18	Jacopo Cappelli	Italy	379	365	367	1111	
19	Naresh Kumar Sharma	India	380	361	368	1109	
20	Laslo Suranji	Serbia	366	372	371	1109	
21	Iurii Stoiev	Ukraine	375	365	363	1103	
22	Miquel Orobitg Guitart	Spain	382	353	367	1102	
23	Phiraphong Buengbok	Thailand	379	353	367	1099	
24	Liu Wen-chang	Chinese Taipei	367	359	372	1098	
25	Jan Schaub	Germany	392	330	373	1095	
26	Jozef Siroky	Slovakia	380	355	348	1083	

Q Qualified for final

== Final ==
Rank	Athlete	Country	Qual	1	2	3	4	5	6	7	8	9	10	Final	Total
1	Jonas Jacobsson	Sweden	1155	9.5	9.7	10.3	10.3	10.1	10.5	10.3	10.1	10.1	10.0	100.9	1255.9
2	Doron Shaziri	Israel	1157	10.0	9.7	10.4	10.6	9.3	9.8	8.6	9.5	10.3	7.2	95.4	1252.4
3	Dong Chao	China	1152	9.3	10.6	9.2	10.4	10.2	9.5	10.0	10.2	10.7	9.4	99.5	1251.5
4	Youngjip Shim	South Korea	1148	10.4	8.9	10.1	9.9	10.3	9.5	8.9	9.2	10.1	10.4	97.7	1245.7
5	Jae Yong Sim	South Korea	1136	9.6	10.4	10.1	9.8	9.9	9.5	10.3	10.8	9.3	10.2	99.9	1235.9
6	Abdulla Sultan Alaryani	United Arab Emirates	1134	10.1	10.1	10.0	7.8	8.8	9.8	9.0	10.2	10.7	9.2	95.7	1229.7
7	Cedric Fevre	France	1133	9.1	8.5	10.3	9.3	9.3	8.6	9.1	10.7	9.5	9.3	93.7	1226.7
8	Obaid Aldahmani	United Arab Emirates	1132	10.2	8.4	9.2	10.0	8.9	9.6	9.9	9.1	8.9	9.2	93.4	1225.4
