= Jesson =

Jesson is a surname. Notable people with the surname include:

- Ben Jesson (born 1988), British sport shooter
- Bradley D. Jesson (1932–2016), Chief Justice of the Arkansas Supreme Court
- Bruce Jesson (1944–1999), New Zealand left wing journalist, author and political figure
- Cecil Jesson (1899–1961), member of the Queensland Legislative Assembly
- Cornelius "Charles" Jesson (1862–1926), British trade unionist and MP
- Paul Jesson (born 1946), British actor
- Ralph William Jesson (1893–1985), US football coach
- Robert Jesson (1886-1917), cricketer and Army Officer
- Thomas Touchet-Jesson, 23rd Baron Audley (1913–1963), English peer
- Vivian Jesson (1893–1957), known as Vivian Rich, silent film actress. Wife of Ralph W. Jesson
- William Jesson (1580-1651), English dyer, mayor and MP

== See also ==
- Jesson's Church of England Primary School, Dudley, UK
- Laura Jesson, Leading female role in Still Life (play) and Brief Encounter (film)
