= United Arab Emirates at the 2012 Summer Paralympics =

- Flag of the United Arab Emirates
- IPC code: UAE
- NPC: UAE Paralympic Committee

in London
- Competitors: 15 in 3 sports
- Medals Ranked 46th: Gold 1 Silver 1 Bronze 1 Total 3

Summer Paralympics appearances (overview)
- 1992; 1996; 2000; 2004; 2008; 2012; 2016; 2020; 2024

The United Arab Emirates competed at the 2012 Summer Paralympics in London. The UAE was represented by 15 competitors.

== Medallists ==
Medal	Name	Sport	Event	Date
Gold	Abdulla Alaryani	Shooting	Mixed 50m Rifle Prone SH1	4 September
Silver	Mohamed Hammadi	Athletics	Men's 200m T34	4 September
Bronze	Mohamed Hammadi	Athletics	Men's 100m T34	8 September

== Athletics ==
Men's Track and Road Events

Athlete	Event	Heat		Final	
Athlete	Event	Result	Rank	Result	Rank
Mohamed Hammadi	100m T34	16.42	2 Q	16.41	3rd place, bronze medalist(s)
Mohamed Hammadi	200m T34	29.03	1 Q	28.95	2nd place, silver medalist(s)
Mohamed Bani Hashem	100m T53	16.01	4	Did not advance	
Mohamed Bani Hashem	200m T53	28.39	6	Did not advance	
Mohammad Vahdani	100m T54	14.52	5	Did not advance	
Mohammad Vahdani	400m T54	50.00	3	Did not advance	
Mohammad Vahdani	800m T54	1:40.38	4	Did not advance	
Mohammad Vahdani	1500m T54	3:13.58	5	Did not advance	

Men's Field Events

Athlete	Event	Distance	Points	Rank
Abdulaziz Alshekaili	Shot Put F32-33	NM		
Ahmed Alhousani	Shot Put F32-33	8.89	800	7
Ahmed Alhousani	Discus Throw F32-34	22.75	658	17
Mohammad Almehairi	Discus Throw F32-34	31.58	696	16
Mohammad Almehairi	Javelin Throw F33-34	24.07	—N/a	13
Issa Al Jahwari	Discus Throw F57-58	42.87	862	7

Women's Field Events

Athlete	Event	Distance	Points	Rank
Thuraya Alzaabi	Shot Put F32-33	NM		
Thuraya Alzaabi	Javelin Throw F33-34/52-53	12.85	—N/a	11
Siham Alrasheedy	Discus Throw F57-58	24.33	776	7
Siham Alrasheedy	Javelin Throw F57-58	18.21	733	10
Mariam Matroushi	Javelin Throw F46	25.38	—N/a	10
Sakina Albalooshi	Club Throw F31-32/51	14.66	783	10

== Powerlifting ==
Men

Athlete	Event	Result	Rank
Mohammed Khalaf	-90kg	DNF	
Ahmed Albaloushi	+100kg	NMR	

== Shooting ==
Athlete	Event	Qualification		Final	
Athlete	Event	Score	Rank	Score	Rank
Abdulla Alaryani	Men's 50m Rifle 3 Positions SH1	1134	6 Q	1229.7	6
Abdulla Alaryani	Men's 10m Air Rifle Standing SH1	589	8 Q	691.8	7
Abdulla Alaryani	Mixed 50m Rifle Prone SH1	592	1 Q	694.8	1st place, gold medalist(s)
Abdulla Alaryani	Mixed 10m Air Rifle Prone SH1	597	23	Did not advance	
Obaid Aldahmani	Men's 50m Rifle 3 Positions SH1	1132	8 Q	1225.4	8
Obaid Aldahmani	Men's 10m Air Rifle Standing SH1	587	13	Did not advance	
Obaid Aldahmani	Mixed 50m Rifle Prone SH1	579	28	Did not advance	
Obaid Aldahmani	Mixed 10m Air Rifle Prone SH1	593	36	Did not advance	

== See also ==
- United Arab Emirates at the 2012 Summer Olympics
