= Athletics at the 2008 Summer Paralympics – Men's shot put F33–34/52 =

The Men's Shot Put F33-34/52 had its Final held on September 12 at 17:00.

== Medalists ==
Gold	Kamel Kardjena; Algeria
Silver	Aigars Apinis; Latvia
Bronze	Kyle Pettey; Canada

== Results ==
Place	Athlete	Class	1	2	3	4	5	6	Best	Points
1	Kamel Kardjena (ALG)	F33	10.14	11.54	9.98	8.64	9.37	10.43	11.54 WR	1109
2	Aigars Apinis (LAT)	F52	9.53	10.02	x	8.92	9.86	9.82	10.02 WR	1098
3	Kyle Pettey (CAN)	F34	11.04	10.16	10.58	10.97	10.84	10.57	11.04	1023
4	Jean-Pierre Talatini (FRA)	F34	11.04	10.16	10.58	10.97	10.84	10.57	11.04	1021
5	Greg Hibberd (AUS)	F34	10.83	10.71	10.58	10.38	10.48	10.45	10.83	1004
6	Hamish MacDonald (AUS)	F34	10.56	10.77	10.35	10.02	10.60	10.82	10.82	1003
7	Roman Musil (CZE)	F33	10.37	10.13	10.35	10.15	10.10	10.33	10.37	996
8	Dan West (GBR)	F34	9.80	10.39	x	9.98	9.83	10.19	10.39	963
9	Georgios Karaminas (GRE)	F52	8.24	8.46	8.69				8.69	952
10	Amar Tarek Boulhbel (ALG)	F33	x	9.55	9.78				9.78	939
11	Rod Farr (AUS)	F52	8.44	8.17	8.49				8.49	930
12	Terry Faleva'ai (NZL)	F34	9.60	9.57	9.65				9.65	895
13	Henrik Plank (SLO)	F52	8.06	8.00	8.04				8.06	883
14	Mohamed Krid (TUN)	F34	9.35	9.43	8.85				9.43	874
15	Almehai Bin Dabbas (UAE)	F34	9.05	9.28	9.37				9.37	869
16	Adel Alrashidi (KUW)	F34	7.97	8.51	8.17				8.51	789
