= Shooting at the 2008 Summer Paralympics – Mixed 10 metre air rifle prone SH1 =

Shootings in china

Mixed 10 metre air rifle prone SH1 at the XIII Paralympic Games
- Venue: Beijing Shooting Range Hall
- Dates: September 11, 2008
- Competitors: 44 from 25 nations

Medalists
1st place, gold medalist(s)		Matt Skelhon	Great Britain
2nd place, silver medalist(s)		Zhang Cuiping	China
3rd place, bronze medalist(s)		Sim Jae-yong	South Korea

The Mixed 10 metre air rifle prone SH1 event at the 2008 Summer Paralympics took place on September 11 at the Beijing Shooting Range Hall.

== Qualification round ==
Rank	Athlete	Country	1	2	3	4	5	6	Total	Notes
1	Matt Skelhon	Great Britain	100	100	100	100	100	100	600	Q
1	Zhang Cuiping	China	100	100	100	100	100	100	600	Q
3	Radoslav Malenovsky	Slovakia	99	100	100	100	100	100	599	Q
3	Sim Jae-yong	South Korea	99	100	100	100	100	100	599	Q
5	Aki Taguchi	Japan	99	100	100	100	100	100	599	Q
5	Christos Trifonidis	Canada	99	100	100	100	100	100	599	Q
7	Sergey Nochevnoy	Russia	100	99	100	100	100	100	599	Q
8	Veronika Vadovičová	Slovakia	100	99	100	100	100	100	599	Q
9	Ab Dulla Al Aryani	United Arab Emirates	100	100	99	100	100	100	599	
10	Jolanta Szulc	Poland	100	100	99	100	100	100	599	
11	Ashley Adams	Australia	100	100	100	99	100	100	599	
12	Nathan Milgate	Great Britain	100	100	100	100	99	100	599	
13	Jonas Jacobsson	Sweden	99	99	100	100	100	100	598	
14	Cedric Friggeri	France	100	100	100	98	100	100	598	
15	Azzurra Ciani	Italy	99	100	100	100	99	100	598	
16	Waldemar Andruszkiewicz	Poland	100	100	100	99	99	100	598	
17	Kazimierz Mechula	Denmark	99	100	100	100	100	99	598	
18	Han Tae-ho	South Korea	100	100	100	100	99	99	598	
19	Libby Kosmala	Australia	100	100	100	99	99	99	597	
20	Kiyoto Matayoshi	Japan	99	98	100	99	100	100	596	
21	Lotta Helsinger	Sweden	99	100	99	98	100	100	596	
22	Franc Pinter	Slovenia	99	100	99	99	99	100	596	
23	Gou Dingchao	China	99	100	100	99	98	100	596	
24	Josef Johann Neumaier	Germany	99	99	99	100	100	99	596	
25	Veikko Palsamaki	Finland	98	100	100	99	100	99	596	
26	Jozef Siroky	Slovakia	99	99	100	100	99	99	596	
27	Miguel Orobitg	Spain	99	99	99	99	99	100	595	
28	Wang Hongzhi	China	98	100	99	100	99	99	595	
29	Erkki Pekkala	Finland	100	99	99	99	99	99	595	
30	Kim Im-yeon	South Korea	99	100	99	99	100	98	595	
31	Snežana Nikolić	Serbia	99	100	99	97	99	100	594	
32	Helmut Mand	Estonia	100	97	99	99	100	99	594	
33	Didier Richard	France	99	99	99	99	99	99	594	
34	Izumi Takehi	Japan	100	98	100	99	99	98	594	
35	Sungvoy Makcium	Thailand	97	99	99	98	100	100	593	
36	Yuriy Stoyev	Ukraine	98	98	100	99	99	99	593	
37	Tapani Merilainen	Finland	98	98	99	100	98	99	592	
38	Liu Wen-chang	Chinese Taipei	99	100	99	99	96	99	592	
39	Norbert Gau	Germany	99	99	97	98	98	99	590	
40	Iurii Samoshkin	Ukraine	100	97	98	97	97	99	588	
41	Michael Dickey	United States	100	99	100	98	94	97	588	
42	Seyed Salehnejad Amrei	Iran	97	100	100	97	99	95	588	
43	Mykola Ovcharenko	Ukraine	97	98	98	97	97	100	587	
44	Hakan Gustafsson	Sweden	91	95	100	98	97	97	578	

Q Qualified for final

== Final ==
Rank	Athlete	Country	Qual	1	2	3	4	5	6	7	8	9	10	Final	Total	Shoot-off
1	Matt Skelhon	Great Britain	600	10.5	10.6	10.4	10.6	10.7	10.4	10.6	10.2	10.6	10.3	104.9	704.9	
2	Zhang Cuiping	China	600	10.0	10.7	9.9	10.7	10.6	10.5	10.2	10.9	10.8	10.1	104.4	704.4	
3	Sim Jae-yong	South Korea	599	10.1	10.8	10.6	10.6	10.5	10.6	10.5	10.4	10.3	10.4	104.8	703.8	10.7
4	Christos Trifonidis	Canada	599	10.7	10.9	10.4	10.4	10.4	10.7	10.5	10.5	9.9	10.4	104.8	703.8	10.6
5	Radoslav Malenovsky	Slovakia	599	10.3	10.5	10.6	10.5	10.4	10.3	10.3	10.7	10.7	10.5	104.8	703.8	10.5
6	Veronika Vadovičová	Slovakia	599	10.3	10.3	10.6	10.3	10.6	10.8	10.6	10.3	10.5	10.4	104.7	703.7	
7	Sergey Nochevnoy	Russia	599	10.4	10.5	10.3	10.3	10.1	10.1	10.8	10.8	10.7	10.0	104.0	703.0	
8	Aki Taguchi	Japan	599	10.3	10.1	10.9	10.5	10.6	10.0	9.6	10.4	10.1	10.5	103.0	702.0	
