= Athletics at the 2008 Summer Paralympics – Men's discus throw F33–34/52 =

The Men's Discus Throw F33-34/52 had its Final held on September 8 at 17:00.

== Medalists ==
Gold	Aigars Apinis; Latvia
Silver	Chris Martin; Great Britain
Bronze	Roman Musil; Czech Republic

== Results ==
Place	Athlete	Class	1	2	3	4	5	6	Best	Points
1	Aigars Apinis (LAT)	F52	x	19.47	18.79	19.78	19.86	20.47	20.47 WR	1097
2	Chris Martin (GBR)	F33	27.20	27.93	28.37	26.51	27.01	28.13	28.37	1074
3	Roman Musil (CZE)	F33	24.94	24.25	26.14	23.68	25.12	27.11	27.11	1026
4	Mohamed Krid (TUN)	F34	37.81	38.09	x	35.96	37.00	37.33	38.09	969
5	Garrett Culliton (IRL)	F52	17.18	17.28	17.60	15.78	17.79	17.76	17.79	953
6	Dan West (GBR)	F34	37.38	36.60	32.93	34.48	x	33.07	37.38	951
7	Mohammad Yaseen (JOR)	F52	14.17	16.06	16.24	15.11	17.05	15.37	17.05	913
8	Almehai Bin Dabbas (UAE)	F34	32.56	32.04	x	27.25	33.36	32.02	33.36	849
9	Henrik Plank (SLO)	F52	14.29	x	14.47				14.47	775
10	Kyle Pettey (CAN)	F34	30.26	28.89	28.35				30.26	770
11	Jalal Khakzadiyeh (IRI)	F34							DNS	
12	S Saleh Farajzadeh (IRI)	F34							DNS	
