= Guitart =

Guitart is a Catalan surname, derived from the Germanic personal name Withard. Notable people with the surname include:

- Enrique Guitart (1909–1999), Spanish actor
- Francisco Coll Guitart (1812–1875), Spanish Roman Catholic priest and saint
- Miquel Orobitg Guitart, Spanish Paralympic shooter
