= Athletics at the 2016 Summer Paralympics – Men's 800 metres T34 =

Cerebral palsy wheelchair competition

Men's 800 metres T34 at the XV Paralympic Games
- Venue: Estádio Olímpico João Havelange
- Dates: 13–14 September 2016
- Competitors: 10 from 9 nations

Medalists
1st place, gold medalist(s)		Mohamed Alhammadi	United Arab Emirates
2nd place, silver medalist(s)		Walid Ktila	Tunisia
3rd place, bronze medalist(s)		Rheed McCracken	Australia

The T34 category is for wheelchair athletes with cerebral palsy. Athletes in this category have minimal limitations or control problems in their arms and trunk while pushing a wheelchair.

The Athletics at the 2016 Summer Paralympics – Men's 800 metres T34 event at the 2016 Paralympic Games took place on 13–14 September 2016, at the Estádio Olímpico João Havelange.

== Heats ==
=== Heat 1 ===
12:23 13 September 2016:

Rank	Lane	Bib	Name	Nationality	Reaction	Time	Notes
1	7	2277	Walid Ktila	Tunisia		1:46.28	Q
2	3	1057	Rheed McCracken	Australia		1:46.31	Q
3	4	1456	Henry Manni	Finland		1:47.51	Q
4	5	1521	Isaac Towers	Great Britain		1:47.75	q
5	6	1474	Sebastien Mobre	France		1:49.97	

=== Heat 2 ===
12:30 13 September 2016:

Rank	Lane	Bib	Name	Nationality	Reaction	Time	Notes
1	7	2300	Mohamed Alhammadi	United Arab Emirates		1:44.96	Q
2	6	2368	Austin Pruitt	United States		1:46.38	Q
3	3	2181	Bojan Mitic	Switzerland		1:46.81	Q
4	4	1212	Austin Smeenk	Canada		1:47.61	q
5	5	1518	Ben Rowlings	Great Britain		1:48.08	

== Final ==
17:50 14 September 2016:

Rank	Lane	Bib	Name	Nationality	Reaction	Time	Notes
1st place, gold medalist(s)	5	2300	Mohamed Alhammadi	United Arab Emirates		1:40.24	
2nd place, silver medalist(s)	7	2277	Walid Ktila	Tunisia		1:40.31	
3rd place, bronze medalist(s)	1	1057	Rheed McCracken	Australia		1:41.25	
4	3	1456	Henry Manni	Finland		1:41.92	
5	6	1521	Isaac Towers	Great Britain		1:43.45	
6	4	2368	Austin Pruitt	United States		1:45.55	
7	2	2181	Bojan Mitic	Switzerland		1:50.74	
	8	1212	Austin Smeenk	Canada			DSQ
