= United Arab Emirates at the 2020 Summer Paralympics =

- Flag of the United Arab Emirates
- IPC code: UAE
- NPC: UAE Paralympic Committee

in Tokyo, Japan 24 August 2021 – 5 September 2021
- Competitors: 12 in 4 sports
- Medals: Gold 1 Silver 1 Bronze 1 Total 3

Summer Paralympics appearances (overview)
- 1992; 1996; 2000; 2004; 2008; 2012; 2016; 2020; 2024

United Arab Emirates competed at the 2020 Summer Paralympics in Tokyo, Japan, from 24 August to 5 September 2021. Abdulla Sultan Alaryani picked the first gold for UAE in the men's 50m shooting competition.

== Medalists ==
| Medal | Name | Sport | Event | Date |
|---|---|---|---|---|
| Gold | Abdulla Sultan Alaryani | Shooting | Men's R7 50 metre rifle 3 positions SH1 | 3 September |
| Silver | Mohamed Alhammadi | Athletics | Men's 800 metres T34 | 4 September |
| Bronze | Mohamed Alhammadi | Athletics | Men's 100 metres T34 | 30 August |

== Competitors ==
| Sport | Men | Women | Total |
|---|---|---|---|
| Athletics | 2 | 3 | 5 |
| Cycling | 1 | 0 | 1 |
| Powerlifting | 1 | 1 | 2 |
| Shooting | 3 | 1 | 4 |
| Total | 7 | 5 | 12 |

== Athletics ==
Mohamed Hammadi competed in the men's 100m T34 and men's 800m T34 events. He qualified for these events after winning the bronze medal in the men's 100m T34 and the gold medal in the men's 800m T34 events at the 2019 World Para Athletics Championships held in Dubai, United Arab Emirates.

Noura Alktebi competed in the women's club throw F32 and women's shot put F32 events. She qualified for both events after finishing in 4th place in both the women's shot put F32 and women's club throw F32 events at the 2019 World Para Athletics Championships.

Men's track

| Athlete | Event | Heats | | Final | |
| Athlete | Event | Result | Rank | Result | Rank |
|---|---|---|---|---|---|
| Mohamed Hammadi | Men's 100m T34 | N/A | | 15.66 SB | 3rd place, bronze medalist(s) |
| Mohamed Hammadi | Men's 800m T34 | | | | |
| Ahmed Nawad | Men's 800m T34 | 1:49.71 | 9 | | |

Women's field

| Athlete | Event | Final | |
| Athlete | Event | Result | Rank |
|---|---|---|---|
| Noura Alktebi | Women's club throw F32 | 18.79 | 6 |
| Noura Alktebi | Women's shot put F32 | 6.49 AR | 4 |

== Shooting ==
Abdullah Sultan Alaryani, Saif Alnuaimi and Abdulla Saif Alaryani are scheduled to compete.

== See also ==
- United Arab Emirates at the Paralympics
