= Shooting at the 2016 Summer Paralympics – Men's 10 metre air rifle standing SH1 =

Men's 10 metre air rifle standing SH1 at the XV Paralympic Games
- Venue: Rio Olympic Shooting Centre
- Dates: 8 September 2016
- Competitors: 22 from 14 nations

Medalists
1st place, gold medalist(s)		Dong Chao	China
2nd place, silver medalist(s)		Abdullah Sultan Alaryani	United Arab Emirates
3rd place, bronze medalist(s)		Kim Su Wan	South Korea

The Men's 10 metre air rifle standing SH1 event at the 2016 Summer Paralympics took place on 8 September at the Olympic Shooting Centre in Rio.

The event consisted of two rounds: a qualifier and a final. In the qualifier, each shooter fired 40 shots with an air rifle at 10 metres distance from the "standing" (interpreted to include seated in wheelchairs) position. Scores for each shot were in increments of 1, with a maximum score of 10.

The top 8 shooters in the qualifying round moved on to the final round. There, they fired an additional 10 shots. These shots scored in increments of .1, with a maximum score of 10.9. The total score from all 50 shots were used to determine the final ranking.

== Qualification round ==
Rank	Athlete	Country	1	2	3	4	Total	Notes
1	Park Hin Jo	South Korea	104.9	102.9	103.6	104.1	625.3	Q / PR
2	Laslo Suranji	Serbia	103.6	104.3	103.3	103.1	620.7	Q
3	Abdullah Sultan Alaryani	United Arab Emirates	100.8	102.9	105.8	103.0	619.5	Q
4	Kim Su Wan	South Korea	101.4	102.4	103.5	104.7	619.4	Q
5	Dong Chao	China	102.2	102.9	104.5	102.5	618.6	Q
6	Didier Richard	France	103.1	103.4	101.8	104.5	618.2	Q
7	Lee Jangho	South Korea	103.2	101.9	104.0	103.4	617.8	Q
8	Gou Dingchao	China	104.4	102.9	102.9	103.9	617.2	Q
9	Jonas Jakobsson	Sweden	101.0	103.7	102.2	102.7	615.5	
10	Hakan Gustafsson	Sweden	101.8	102.4	103.4	102.3	614.2	
11	Franc Pinter	Slovenia	103.2	101.2	100.6	103.6	613.8	
12	Norbert Gau	Germany	100.6	100.8	103.5	104.3	613.8	
13	Josef Neumaier	Germany	102.9	100.8	102.8	102.4	612.3	
14	Iurii Stoiev	Ukraine	101.6	100.1	103.6	102.1	611.7	
15	Martin Hall	Sweden	100.9	103.0	102.8	101.2	610.9	
16	Andrii Doroshenko	Ukraine	101.5	99.8	102.2	102.6	608.2	
17	Savas Ustun	Turkey	101.7	100.5	101.7	101.2	604.1	
18	Obaid Aldahmani	United Arab Emirates	97.9	100.0	101.3	101.6	603.2	
19	Sean Baldwin	Ireland	98.8	100.4	99.2	98.9	598.9	
20	Atidet Intanon	Thailand	96.7	101.4	99.9	101.9	597.0	
21	Sharma Naresh Kumar	India	98.1	95.6	99.2	103.3	583.0	
22	Owen Burke	Great Britain	92.3	98.2	100.0	30.6	321.11	DNF

Q – Qualified for final

== Final ==
Rank	Athlete	Country	1	2	3	4	5	6	7	8	9	Total	Notes
1st place, gold medalist(s)	Dong Chao	China	31.5	30.6	21.2	20.5	20.1	20.7	20.2	20.1	20.9	205.8	FPR
2nd place, silver medalist(s)	Abdullah Sultan Alaryani	United Arab Emirates	30.4	31.0	18.9	20.9	21.4	20.1	20.0	19.9	20.0	202.6	
3rd place, bronze medalist(s)	Kim Su Wan	South Korea	30.2	30.6	20.2	20.1	20.5	20.5	20.0	19.6		181.7	
4	Lee Jangho	South Korea	30.1	29.3	20.6	20.9	19.8	20.5	20.2			161.4	
5	Laslo Suranji	Serbia	30.1	31.0	20.9	21.2	21.3	13.8				139.0	
6	Park Hin Jo	South Korea	30.3	31.0	19.6	20.4	19.3					120.6	
7	Didier Richard	France	31.3	29.0	20.6	19.6						100.5	
8	Gou Dingchao	China	32.0	28.9	19.0							79.9	
