= United Arab Emirates at the 2000 Summer Paralympics =

- Flag of the United Arab Emirates
- IPC code: UAE
- NPC: UAE Paralympic Committee

in Sydney
- Competitors: 14
- Medals Ranked 52nd: Gold 0 Silver 3 Bronze 1 Total 4

Summer Paralympics appearances (overview)
- 1992; 1996; 2000; 2004; 2008; 2012; 2016; 2020; 2024

The United Arab Emirates competed at the 2000 Summer Paralympics in Sydney, Australia. 14 competitors from the United Arab Emirates won 4 medals, including 3 silver and 1 bronze to finish joint 52nd in the medal table along with the Faroe Islands.

== Medallists ==
Medal	Name	Sport	Event
Silver	Ahmed Saif Zaal Abu Muhair	Athletics	Men's 400m T36
Silver	Naseib Obaid Sebait Araidat	Athletics	Men's 400m T52
Silver	Humaid Hassan Murad Eisa	Athletics	Men's javelin F52
Bronze	Ahmed Saif Zaal Abu Muhair	Athletics	Men's 200m T36

== See also ==
- United Arab Emirates at the Paralympics
- United Arab Emirates at the 2000 Summer Olympics
