= United Arab Emirates at the 2004 Summer Paralympics =

- Flag of the United Arab Emirates
- IPC code: UAE
- NPC: UAE Paralympic Committee

in Athens
- Competitors: 10 in 2 sports
- Medals Ranked 51st: Gold 1 Silver 1 Bronze 2 Total 4

Summer Paralympics appearances (overview)
- 1992; 1996; 2000; 2004; 2008; 2012; 2016; 2020; 2024

United Arab Emirates competed at the 2004 Summer Paralympics in Athens, Greece. The team included 10 athletes. Competitors from United Arab Emirates won 4 medals, including 1 gold, 1 silver and 2 bronze to finish 51st in the medal table.

== Medallists ==
Medal	Name	Sport	Event
Gold	Mohammed Khamis Khalaf	Powerlifting	Men's 82.5kg
Silver	Mana Abdulla Sulaiman	Athletics	Men's shot put F32
Bronze	Ali Al Ansari	Athletics	Men's 400m T37
Bronze	Mohammed Bin Dabbas	Athletics	Men's discus throw F33/34

== Sports ==
=== Athletics ===
==== Men's track ====
Athlete	Class	Event	Heats		Semifinal		Final	
Athlete	Class	Event	Result	Rank	Result	Rank	Result	Rank
Ayed Alhababi	T53	100m	15.91	8 q	—		16.11	8
Jasim Al Naqbi	T54	100m	15.18	17	did not advance			
Jasim Al Naqbi	T54	200m	27.86	22	did not advance			
Ahmed Hassan	T36	100m	12.76	4 Q	—		12.79	5
Ahmed Hassan	T36	200m	—				26.62	8
Ahmed Hassan	T36	400m	1:02.21	7 q	—		1:01.56	7
Ali Qambar Al Ansari	T37	100m	12.58	6 Q	—		12.63	6
Ali Qambar Al Ansari	T37	200m	25.74	5 Q	—		25.14	4
Ali Qambar Al Ansari	T37	400m	—				55.53	3rd place, bronze medalist(s)

==== Men's field ====
Athlete	Class	Event	Final		
Athlete	Class	Event	Result	Points	Rank
Mana Abdulla Sulaiman	F32	Shot put	7.18	-	2nd place, silver medalist(s)
Humaid Al Mazam	F52-53	Javelin	16.23	1016	5
Humaid Al Mazam	F54	Discus	23.10	-	7
Mohammad Bin Dabbas	F33-34	Discus	35.81	868	3rd place, bronze medalist(s)
Juma Salem Hassan Ali	F33-34	Discus	17.00	873	8
Juma Salem Hassan Ali	F33-34	Shot put	5.36	536	12
Khamis Masood Abdullah	F33-34	Shot put	9.80	927	7

=== Powerlifting ===
Athlete	Event	Result	Rank
Mohammed Khamis Khalaf	82.5kg	217.5	1st place, gold medalist(s)

== See also ==
- United Arab Emirates at the Paralympics
- United Arab Emirates at the 2004 Summer Olympics
