= United Arab Emirates at the 2024 Summer Paralympics =

- Flag of the United Arab Emirates
- IPC code: UAE
- NPC: UAE Paralympic Committee

in Paris, France August 28, 2024 – September 8, 2024
- Competitors: 13 in 5 sports
- Flag bearers: Ahmed Albedwawi; Maryam Alzeyoudi
- Medals: Gold 0 Silver 0 Bronze 0 Total 0

Summer Paralympics appearances (overview)
- 1992; 1996; 2000; 2004; 2008; 2012; 2016; 2020; 2024

The United Arab Emirates competed at the 2024 Summer Paralympics in Paris, France, from 28 August to 8 September.

== Competitors ==
The following is the list of number of competitors in the Games.

Sport	Men	Women	Total
Athletics	2	3	5
Cycling	1	0	1
Judo	1	0	1
Powerlifting	0	1	1
Shooting	2	3	5
Total	6	7	13

== Athletics ==
Emirati track and field athletes achieved quota places for the following events based on their results at the 2023 World Championships, 2024 World Championships, or through high performance allocation, as long as they meet the minimum entry standard (MES).

Key

- Note–Ranks given for track events are within the athlete's heat only
- Q = Qualified for the next round
- q = Qualified for the next round as a fastest loser or, in field events, by position without achieving the qualifying target
- DQ = Disqualified
- PR = Paralympic Record
- AR = Area (or continental) Record
- NR = National Record
- SB = Season's Best
- N/A = Round not applicable for the event
- Bye = Athlete not required to compete in round

Track & road events

Athlete	Event	Heats		Final	
Athlete	Event	Result	Rank	Result	Rank
Mohamad Othman	Men's 100 m T34	15.77 q	7	15.40	5
Mohamad Othman	Men's 800 m T34	1:44.88	7	Did not advance	

Field events

Athlete	Event	Final	
Athlete	Event	Distance	Position
Mohammed Al Kaabi	Men's shot put F36	12.24	7
Noura Alktebi	Women's shot put F32	5.92	5
Noura Alktebi	Women's club throw F32	20.69	8
Maryam Alzeyoudi	Women's shot put F40	Withdrawn	
Maryam Alzeyoudi	Women's discus throw F41	17.45	12
Thekra Alkaabi	Women's shot put F42	Withdrawn	
Thekra Alkaabi	Women's club throw F42	20.29	9

== Cycling ==
United Arab Emirates entered one male para-cyclist after finished the top eligible nation's at the 2022 UCI Nation's ranking allocation ranking.

=== Road ===
Men

Athlete	Event	Time	Rank
Ahmed Albedwawi	Men's road race C4-5	-1 Lap	22
Ahmed Albedwawi	Men's time trial C5	Withdrawn	

=== Track ===
Men

Athlete	Event	Qualification		Final	
Athlete	Event	Time	Rank	Time	Rank
Ahmed Albedwawi	Men's time trial C4-5	1:13.100	22	Did not advance	
Ahmed Albedwawi	Men's pursuit C5	4:56.305	14	Did not advance	

== Judo ==
Athlete	Event	Round of 64	Round of 32	Round of 16	Quarterfinals	Semifinals	Repechage	Final / BM	
Athlete	Event	Opposition Result	Opposition Result	Opposition Result	Opposition Result	Opposition Result	Opposition Result	Opposition Result	Rank
Mayram Aldhanhani	Women's + 70 Kg J1								

== Powerlifting ==
Athlete	Event	Attempts (kg)				Result (kg)	Rank
Athlete	Event	1	2	3	4	Result (kg)	Rank
Mohammed Khamis Khalaf	Men's 88 kg						

== Shooting ==
United Arab Emirates entered five para-shooter's after achieved quota places for the following events by virtue of their best finishes at the 2022, 2023 and 2024 world cup, 2022 World Championships, 2023 World Championships and 2022 Asian Para Games, as long as they obtained a minimum qualifying score (MQS) by July 15, 2024.

Men

Athlete	Event	Qualification		Final	
Athlete	Event	Points	Rank	Points	Rank
Abdulla Sultan Alaryani	R1 Men's 10 m air rifle standing SH1				
Abdulla Sultan Alaryani	R7 Men's 50 m rifle 3 positions SH1				
Obaid Aldahmani	R1 Men's 10 m air rifle standing SH1				
Obaid Aldahmani	R7 Men's 50 m rifle 3 positions SH1				

Women

Athlete	Event	Qualification		Final	
Athlete	Event	Points	Rank	Points	Rank
Abdulla Sultan Alaryani	R1 Men's 10 m air rifle standing SH1				
Abdulla Sultan Alaryani	R7 Men's 50 m rifle 3 positions SH1				

Mixed

Athlete	Event	Qualification		Final	
Athlete	Event	Points	Rank	Points	Rank
Ayesha Alshamsi	R4 – 10 m air rifle standing SH2	630.1	14	Did not advance	
Ayesha Alshamsi	R5 Mixed 10 m air rifle prone SH2				
Ayesha Almehairi	R4 – 10 m air rifle standing SH2	626.7	22	Did not advance	
Ayesha Almehairi	R5 Mixed 10 m air rifle prone SH2				
Abdulla Sultan Alaryani	R6 Mixed 50 m rifle prone SH1				
Obaid Aldahmani	R3 Mixed 10 m air rifle prone SH1				
Saif Alnuami	R6 Mixed 50 m rifle prone SH1				
Saif Alnuami	R3 Mixed 10 m air rifle prone SH1				

== See also ==
- United Arab Emirates at the 2024 Summer Olympics
- United Arab Emirates at the Paralympics
