= Athletics at the 2008 Summer Paralympics – Men's javelin throw F33–34/52 =

The Men's Javelin Throw F33-34/52 had its Final held on September 15 at 9:00.

== Medalists ==
Gold	Faouzi Rzig; Tunisia
Silver	Mohamed Krid; Tunisia
Bronze	Jean-Pierre Talatini; France

== Results ==
Place	Athlete	Class	1	2	3	4	5	6	Best	Points
1	Faouzi Rzig (TUN)	F34	31.54	29.46	28.80	30.93	31.02	34.81	34.81 WR	1305
2	Mohamed Krid (TUN)	F34	30.68	x	x	30.40	31.26	29.95	31.26	1172
3	Jean-Pierre Talatini (FRA)	F34	23.88	31.19	28.50	x	28.01	x	31.19	1169
4	Roman Musil (CZE)	F33	20.31	x	x	21.70	23.50	25.05	25.05 PR	1158
5	Almehai Bin Dabbas (UAE)	F34	28.14	27.01	27.42	27.46	27.00	28.72	28.72	1077
6	Rod Farr (AUS)	F52	15.55	15.67	15.77	x	17.55	16.76	17.55 PR	1003
7	Damien Bowen (AUS)	F34	x	26.52	24.82	x	x	x	26.52	994
8	Georgios Karaminas (GRE)	F52	16.03	16.38	16.45	15.77	15.69	15.57	16.45	940
9	Adel Alrashidi (KUW)	F34	22.89	22.60	22.18				22.89	858
10	Henrik Plank (SLO)	F52	14.49	13.77	x				14.49	828
