= Shooting at the 2020 Summer Paralympics – R7 Men's 50 metre rifle 3 positions SH1 =

R7 Men's 50 metre rifle 3 positions SH1 at the XVI Paralympic Games
- Venue: Asaka Shooting Range
- Dates: 3 September 2021
- Competitors: 19 from 13 nations

Medalists
| 1st place, gold medalist(s) | | Abdulla Sultan Alaryani | United Arab Emirates |
| 2nd place, silver medalist(s) | | Laslo Šuranji | Serbia |
| 3rd place, bronze medalist(s) | | Shim Young-jip | South Korea |

The Men's R7 50 metre rifle 3 positions SH1 event at the 2020 Summer Paralympics took place on 3 September at the Asaka Shooting Range in Tokyo.

The event consisted of two rounds: a qualifier and a final. The top 8 shooters in the qualifying round moved on to the final round.

== Records ==
Prior to this competition, the existing world and Paralympic records were as follows.

Qualification records
| World Record | Abdulla Sultan Alaryani (UAE) | 1175 | Suhl, Germany | 25 July 2014 |
| Paralympic Record | Laslo Šuranji (SRB) | 1165 | Rio de Janeiro, Brazil | 12 September 2016 |

Final records
| World Record | Jonas Jakobsson (SWE) | 468.9 | Alicante, Spain | 23 October 2013 |
| Paralympic Record | Laslo Šuranji (SRB) | 453.7 | Rio de Janeiro, Brazil | 12 September 2016 |

== Schedule ==
All times are Japan Standard Time (UTC+9)

| Date | Time | Round |
|---|---|---|
| Friday, 3 September 2021 | 09:30 | Qualification |
| Friday, 3 September 2021 | 15:15 | Final |

== Results ==
=== Qualification ===
| Rank | Athlete | Country | Kneeling | Prone | Standing | Total | Notes |
|---|---|---|---|---|---|---|---|
| 1 | Ju Sung-chul | South Korea | 392 | 398 | 383 | 1173-59x | Q, PR |
| 2 | Park Jin-ho | South Korea | 390 | 395 | 386 | 1171-59x | Q |
| 3 | Laslo Šuranji | Serbia | 386 | 395 | 383 | 1164-63x | Q |
| 4 | Dong Chao | China | 385 | 394 | 383 | 1162-50x | Q |
| 5 | Shim Young-jip | South Korea | 388 | 388 | 385 | 1161-54x | Q |
| 6 | Yurii Stoiev | Ukraine | 384 | 389 | 384 | 1157-48x | Q |
| 7 | Radoslav Malenovský | Slovakia | 383 | 394 | 379 | 1156-39x | Q |
| 8 | Abdulla Sultan Alaryani | United Arab Emirates | 386 | 391 | 377 | 1154-30x | Q |
| 9 | Andrii Doroshenko | Ukraine | 389 | 387 | 374 | 1150-48x | |
| 10 | Doron Shaziri | Israel | 382 | 397 | 371 | 1150-46x | |
| 11 | Didier Richard | France | 379 | 391 | 373 | 1143-43x | |
| 12 | Atidet Intanon | Thailand | 376 | 392 | 374 | 1142-38x | |
| 13 | Andrey Kozhemyakin | RPC | 375 | 391 | 373 | 1139-41x | |
| 14 | Jacopo Cappelli | Italy | 376 | 390 | 366 | 1132-22x | |
| 15 | Sotirios Galogavros | Greece | 381 | 386 | 364 | 1131-45x | |
| 16 | Abdulla Saif Alaryani | United Arab Emirates | 376 | 388 | 361 | 1125-31x | |
| 17 | Tian Fugang | China | 380 | 387 | 356 | 1123-32x | |
| 18 | Deepak Saini | India | 372 | 383 | 359 | 1114-28x | |
| 19 | Phiraphong Buengbok | Thailand | 377 | 380 | 355 | 1112-35x | |

=== Final ===
| Rank | Athlete | Series | | | | | | | | | | | | | Total | Notes |
| Rank | Athlete | Kneeling | | | Prone | | | Standing | | | | | | | Total | Notes |
| Rank | Athlete | 1 | 2 | 3 | 4 | 5 | 6 | 7 | 8 | 9 | 10 | 11 | 12 | 13 | Total | Notes |
|---|---|---|---|---|---|---|---|---|---|---|---|---|---|---|---|---|
| 1st place, gold medalist(s) | Abdulla Sultan Alaryani (UAE) | 49.9 | 52.1 | 50.6 | 50.8 | 50.2 | 52.5 | 49.7 | 49.2 | 9.9 | 9.4 | 9.9 | 9.3 | 10.1 | 453.6 | |
| 1st place, gold medalist(s) | Abdulla Sultan Alaryani (UAE) | 49.9 | 102.0 | 152.6 | 203.4 | 253.6 | 306.1 | 355.8 | 405.0 | 414.9 | 424.3 | 434.2 | 443.5 | 453.6 | 453.6 | |
| 2nd place, silver medalist(s) | Laslo Šuranji (SRB) | 50.7 | 51.7 | 50.0 | 51.5 | 52.0 | 51.9 | 46.5 | 49.5 | 10.2 | 9.7 | 8.8 | 10.1 | 10.3 | 452.9 | |
| 2nd place, silver medalist(s) | Laslo Šuranji (SRB) | 50.7 | 102.4 | 152.4 | 203.9 | 255.9 | 307.8 | 354.3 | 403.8 | 414.0 | 423.7 | 432.5 | 442.6 | 452.9 | 452.9 | |
| 3rd place, bronze medalist(s) | Shim Young-jip (KOR) | 50.4 | 51.8 | 49.7 | 48.9 | 51.0 | 50.2 | 50.7 | 50.6 | 9.6 | 10.2 | 9.9 | 9.2 | | 442.2 | |
| 3rd place, bronze medalist(s) | Shim Young-jip (KOR) | 50.4 | 102.2 | 151.9 | 200.8 | 251.8 | 302.0 | 352.7 | 403.3 | 412.9 | 423.1 | 433.0 | 442.2 | | 442.2 | |
| 4 | Dong Chao (CHN) | 49.4 | 49.4 | 50.0 | 51.5 | 51.4 | 51.8 | 50.5 | 49.1 | 9.5 | 9.7 | 9.2 | | | 431.5 | |
| 4 | Dong Chao (CHN) | 49.4 | 98.8 | 148.8 | 200.3 | 251.7 | 303.5 | 354.0 | 403.1 | 412.6 | 422.3 | 431.5 | | | 431.5 | |
| 5 | Park Jin-ho (KOR) | 50.4 | 50.4 | 51.7 | 49.6 | 51.5 | 51.6 | 48.6 | 49.3 | 9.6 | 9.0 | | | | 421.7 | |
| 5 | Park Jin-ho (KOR) | 50.4 | 100.8 | 152.5 | 202.1 | 253.6 | 305.2 | 353.8 | 403.1 | 412.7 | 421.7 | | | | 421.7 | |
| 6 | Ju Sung-chul (KOR) | 51.3 | 50.7 | 50.6 | 51.8 | 50.2 | 50.7 | 49.9 | 47.2 | 9.9 | | | | | 412.3 | |
| 6 | Ju Sung-chul (KOR) | 51.3 | 102.0 | 152.6 | 204.4 | 254.6 | 305.3 | 355.2 | 402.4 | 412.3 | | | | | 412.3 | |
| 7 | Radoslav Malenovský (SVK) | 50.6 | 49.0 | 49.1 | 52.5 | 50.9 | 49.7 | 49.7 | 39.8 | | | | | | 401.3 | |
| 7 | Radoslav Malenovský (SVK) | 51.6 | 99.6 | 148.7 | 201.2 | 252.1 | 301.8 | 351.5 | 401.3 | | | | | | 401.3 | |
| 8 | Yurii Stoiev (UKR) | 49.3 | 50.1 | 48.8 | 49.6 | 51.2 | 50.7 | 49.5 | 49.7 | | | | | | 398.9 | |
| 8 | Yurii Stoiev (UKR) | 50.0 | 99.4 | 148.2 | 197.8 | 249.0 | 299.7 | 349.2 | 398.9 | | | | | | 398.9 | |
