= Shooting at the 2023 European Para Championships =

- Venue: Rotterdam Ahoy
- Location: Rotterdam, Netherlands
- Start date: 17 August
- End date: 20 August

Shooting at the 2023 European Para Championships in Rotterdam, Netherlands will take place between 17 and 20 August. There will be nine events: two men's events, two women's events and five mixed events.

The winners of the men's R1, women's R2 and mixed R4 air rifle standing events and men's P1 and women's P2 air pistol events will receive one slot allocation for the shooting at the 2024 Summer Paralympics - a total of six allocation slots will be distributed.

== Medal table ==
* Host nation (Netherlands)

Rank	Nation	Gold	Silver	Bronze	Total
1	Ukraine	2	2	1	5
2	Slovakia	2	1	0	3
3	Poland	1	2	1	4
4	France	1	0	2	3
5	Turkey	1	0	1	2
6	Italy	1	0	0	1
6	Slovenia	1	0	0	1
8	Spain	0	3	0	3
9	Lithuania	0	1	0	1
10	Great Britain	0	0	2	2
11	Azerbaijan	0	0	1	1
11	Denmark	0	0	1	1
Totals (12 entries)		9	9	9	27

== Medalists ==
Event	Gold	Silver	Bronze
R1 Men's 10m air rifle standing SH1	Andrii Doroshenko; Ukraine	Marek Dobrowolski; Poland	Martin Black Jørgensen; Denmark
R2 Women's 10m air rifle standing SH1	Iryna Shchetnik; Ukraine	Veronika Vadovičová; Slovakia	Emilia Babska; Poland
R3 Mixed 10m air rifle prone SH1	Veronika Vadovičová; Slovakia	Juan Antonio Saavedra Reinaldo; Spain	Matt Skelhon; Great Britain
R4 Mixed 10m air rifle standing SH2	Franček Gorazd Tiršek; Slovenia	Vitalii Plakushchyi; Ukraine	Tanguy de La Forest; France
R5 Mixed 10m air rifle prone SH2	Pierre Guillaume-Sage; France	Vasyl Kovalchuk; Ukraine	Hakan Cevik; Turkey
P1 Men's 10m air pistol SH1	Davide Franceschetti; Italy	Kacper Pierzynski; Poland	Oleksii Denysiuk; Ukraine
P2 Women's 10m air pistol SH1	Aysegül Pehlivanlar; Turkey	Raimeda Bucinskyte; Lithuania	Aybaniz Babayeva; Azerbaijan
VIS Mixed 10m air rifle V1 standing SH-VI	Barbara Moskal; Poland	Ager Solabarrieta Txakartegi; Spain	David Dulin; France
VIP Mixed 10m air rifle V1 prone SH-VI	Veronika Vadovičová; Slovakia	Juan Antonio Saavedra Reinaldo; Spain	Matthew Skelhon; Great Britain

== See also ==
- Shooting at the 2023 European Games
