= Volleyball at the 2012 Summer Paralympics – Women's tournament =

Volleyball at the XIV Paralympic Games
- Venue: ExCeL Exhibition Centre
- Dates: 30 August – 8 September 2012

Medalists
| 1st place, gold medalist(s) | | China (CHN) (women) |
| 2nd place, silver medalist(s) | | United States (USA) (women) |
| 3rd place, bronze medalist(s) | | Ukraine (UKR) (women) |

The women's tournament in sitting volleyball at the 2012 Summer Paralympics was held between 30 August and 8 September.

== Results ==
=== Preliminary round ===
==== Group A ====
| Pos | Team | Pld | W | L | Pts | SW | SL | SR | SPW | SPL | SPR |
|---|---|---|---|---|---|---|---|---|---|---|---|
| 1 | Ukraine | 3 | 3 | 0 | 6 | 9 | 1 | 9.000 | 241 | 167 | 1.443 |
| 2 | Netherlands | 3 | 2 | 1 | 5 | 7 | 4 | 1.750 | 251 | 201 | 1.249 |
| 3 | Japan | 3 | 1 | 2 | 4 | 4 | 6 | 0.667 | 190 | 218 | 0.872 |
| 4 | Great Britain | 3 | 0 | 3 | 3 | 0 | 9 | 0.000 | 129 | 225 | 0.573 |

| 31 August 2012; 9:00 | Great Britain | 0–3 | Ukraine | ExCeL London, London; Attendance: Report; Referees: Adnan Kolos (BIH), Sari Mannersuo (FIN) |
| 31 August 2012; 9:00 | (9–25, 20–25, 14–25) | | | ExCeL London, London; Attendance: Report; Referees: Adnan Kolos (BIH), Sari Mannersuo (FIN) |

| 31 August 2012; 19:00 | Netherlands | 3–1 | Japan | ExCeL London, London; Referees: Amin Al-Traifi (KSA), Dominik Raca (CRO) |
| 31 August 2012; 19:00 | (22–25, 25–18, 25–13, 25–14); Report | | | ExCeL London, London; Referees: Amin Al-Traifi (KSA), Dominik Raca (CRO) |

| 1 September 2012; 16:00 | Great Britain | 0–3 | Netherlands | ExCeL London, London; Referees: Mourad El-Baroudy (EGY), Xin Xia (CHN) |
| 1 September 2012; 16:00 | (13–25, 12–25, 15–25); Report | | | ExCeL London, London; Referees: Mourad El-Baroudy (EGY), Xin Xia (CHN) |

| 2 September 2012; 11:00 | Netherlands | 1–3 | Ukraine | ExCeL London, London; Referees: Jung Mal-Soon (KOR), Dimosthenis Kostopoulos (GRE) |
| 2 September 2012; 11:00 | (24–26, 25–15, 11–25, 19–25); Report | | | ExCeL London, London; Referees: Jung Mal-Soon (KOR), Dimosthenis Kostopoulos (GRE) |

| 2 September 2012; 19:00 | Great Britain | 0–3 | Japan | ExCeL London, London; Referees: Dariusz Jasinski (POL), Anton Probst (GER) |
| 2 September 2012; 19:00 | (11–25, 21–25, 14–25); Report | | | ExCeL London, London; Referees: Dariusz Jasinski (POL), Anton Probst (GER) |

| 3 September 2012; 16:00 | Ukraine | 3–0 | Japan | ExCeL London, London; Referees: Ronaldo Chaves (BRA), Joe Campbell (USA) |
| 3 September 2012; 16:00 | (25–20, 25–9, 25–16); Report | | | ExCeL London, London; Referees: Ronaldo Chaves (BRA), Joe Campbell (USA) |

==== Group B ====
| Pos | Team | Pld | W | L | Pts | SW | SL | SR | SPW | SPL | SPR |
|---|---|---|---|---|---|---|---|---|---|---|---|
| 1 | China | 3 | 3 | 0 | 6 | 9 | 2 | 4.500 | 275 | 138 | 1.993 |
| 2 | United States | 3 | 2 | 1 | 5 | 7 | 2 | 3.500 | 245 | 187 | 1.310 |
| 3 | Brazil | 3 | 1 | 2 | 4 | 4 | 8 | 0.500 | 242 | 273 | 0.886 |
| 4 | Slovenia | 3 | 0 | 3 | 3 | 2 | 9 | 0.222 | 176 | 260 | 0.677 |

| 31 August 2012; 16:00 | China | 3–1 | United States | ExCeL London, London; Referees: Ute Fischer (GER), Khalid Shanishah (LBA) |
| 31 August 2012; 16:00 | (22–25, 32–30, 25–23, 25–17); Report | | | ExCeL London, London; Referees: Ute Fischer (GER), Khalid Shanishah (LBA) |

| 1 September 2012; 9:00 | China | 3–1 | Brazil | ExCeL London, London; Referees: Benno Meijer (NED), Adnan Kolas (BIH) |
| 1 September 2012; 9:00 | (26–24, 25–15, 20–25, 25–16); Report | | | ExCeL London, London; Referees: Benno Meijer (NED), Adnan Kolas (BIH) |

| 1 September 2012; 19:00 | United States | 3–0 | Slovenia | ExCeL London, London; Referees: Masoud Yazdan Panah (IRI), France Marcoux (CAN) |
| 1 September 2012; 19:00 | (25–8, 25–15, 25–8); Report | | | ExCeL London, London; Referees: Masoud Yazdan Panah (IRI), France Marcoux (CAN) |

| 2 September 2012; 16:00 | Slovenia | 2–3 | Brazil | ExCeL London, London; Referees: Glynn Archibald (GBR), Toomas Murulo (EST) |
| 2 September 2012; 16:00 | (17–25, 28–30, 25–19, 25–21, 7–15); Report | | | ExCeL London, London; Referees: Glynn Archibald (GBR), Toomas Murulo (EST) |

| 3 September 2012; 9:00 | China | 3–0 | Slovenia | ExCeL London, London; Referees: Ute Fischer (GER), Adnan Kolos (BIH) |
| 3 September 2012; 9:00 | (25–12, 25–15, 25–16); Report | | | ExCeL London, London; Referees: Ute Fischer (GER), Adnan Kolos (BIH) |

| 3 September 2012; 19:00 | United States | 3–0 | Brazil | ExCeL London, London; Referees: Jung Mal-Soon (KOR), Khalid Shanishah (LBA) |
| 3 September 2012; 19:00 | (25–13, 25–20, 25–19); Report | | | ExCeL London, London; Referees: Jung Mal-Soon (KOR), Khalid Shanishah (LBA) |

=== Final round ===
Semi-finals
Ukraine | 0
United States | 3
Netherlands | 2
China | 3

Final
United States | 1
China | 3
Third place
Ukraine | 3
Netherlands | 0

==== Semi-finals ====
| 5 September 2012; 16:00 | Ukraine | 0–3 | United States | ExCeL London, London; Referees: Dominik Raca (CRO), Stephen Giugni (AUS) |
| 5 September 2012; 16:00 | (14–25, 13–25, 19–25); Report | | | ExCeL London, London; Referees: Dominik Raca (CRO), Stephen Giugni (AUS) |

| 5 September 2012; 19:00 | Netherlands | 2–3 | China | ExCeL London, London; Referees: Glynn Archibald (GBR), Sari Mannersuo (FIN) |
| 5 September 2012; 19:00 | (25–17, 14–25, 25–13, 16–25, 11–15); Report | | | ExCeL London, London; Referees: Glynn Archibald (GBR), Sari Mannersuo (FIN) |

==== Bronze medal match ====
| 7 September 2012; 19:00 | Ukraine | 3–0 | Netherlands | ExCeL London, London; Referees: Joe Campbell (GBR), France Marcoux (CAN) |
| 7 September 2012; 19:00 | (25–14, 25–21, 25–16); Report | | | ExCeL London, London; Referees: Joe Campbell (GBR), France Marcoux (CAN) |

==== Gold medal match ====
| September 7, 2012; 21:00 | United States | 1–3 | China | ExCeL London, London; Referees: Janko Plesnik (SLO), Ute Fischer (GER) |
| September 7, 2012; 21:00 | (25–22, 15–25, 30–32, 15–25); Report | | | ExCeL London, London; Referees: Janko Plesnik (SLO), Ute Fischer (GER) |

=== Classification round ===
5th–8th place semi-finals
Brazil | 3
Great Britain | 0
Japan | 0
Slovenia | 3

5th–6th place match
Brazil | 3
Slovenia | 1
7th–8th place match
Great Britain | 0
Japan | 3

==== 5th–8th place semi-finals ====
| 4 September 2012; 19:00 | Brazil | 3–0 | Great Britain | ExCeL London, London; Referees: Stephen Giugni (AUS), Masoud Yazdanpanah (IRI) |
| 4 September 2012; 19:00 | (25–19, 25–10, 25–7); Report | | | ExCeL London, London; Referees: Stephen Giugni (AUS), Masoud Yazdanpanah (IRI) |

| 4 September 2012; 21:00 | Japan | 0–3 | Slovenia | ExCeL London, London; Referees: France Marcoux (CAN), Dee Wauchope (GBR) |
| 4 September 2012; 21:00 | (19–25, 22–25, 20–25); Report | | | ExCeL London, London; Referees: France Marcoux (CAN), Dee Wauchope (GBR) |

==== 7th–8th place match ====
| 6 September 2012; 9:00 | Great Britain | 0–3 | Japan | ExCeL London, London; Referees: Dimosthenis Kostopoulos (GRE), Janko Plesnik (SLO) |
| 6 September 2012; 9:00 | (23–25, 19–25, 13–25); Report | | | ExCeL London, London; Referees: Dimosthenis Kostopoulos (GRE), Janko Plesnik (SLO) |

==== 5th–6th place match ====
| 6 September 2012; 11:00 | Brazil | 3–1 | Slovenia | ExCeL London, London; Referees: Mourad El-Baroudy (EGY), Stephen Giugni (AUS) |
| 6 September 2012; 11:00 | (25–16, 25–14, 21–25, 25–21); Report | | | ExCeL London, London; Referees: Mourad El-Baroudy (EGY), Stephen Giugni (AUS) |

== Final ranking ==
| Rank | Team |
|---|---|
| Gold medal | United States |
| Silver medal | China |
| Bronze medal | Ukraine |
| 4 | Netherlands |
| 5 | Brazil |
| 6 | Slovenia |
| 7 | Japan |
| 8 | Great Britain |

== See also ==
- Volleyball at the 2012 Summer Paralympics – Men's tournament
