= Slovenia at the 2024 Summer Paralympics =

- IPC code: SLO
- NPC: Slovenia National Paralympic Committee

in Paris, France August 28, 2024 – September 8, 2024
- Competitors: 14 in 4 sports
- Flag bearers: Lena Gabršček; Henrik Plank
- Medals Ranked 61st: Gold 1 Silver 0 Bronze 1 Total 2

Summer Paralympics appearances (overview)
- 1992; 1996; 2000; 2004; 2008; 2012; 2016; 2020; 2024

Other related appearances
- Yugoslavia (1972–2000)

Slovenia competed at the 2024 Summer Paralympics in Paris, France, from 28 August to 8 September, 2024.

== Competitors ==
The following is the list of number of competitors in the Games.

Sport	Men	Women	Total
Archery	1	1	2
Athletics	1	0	1
Sitting volleyball	0	10	10
Shooting	1	0	1
Total	3	11	14

== Medalists ==
Medal	Name	Sport	Event	Date
Gold	Franček Gorazd Tiršek	Shooting	Mixed R4 10 metre air rifle standing SH2	30 August
Bronze	Živa Lavrinc; Dejan Fabčič	Archery	Mixed team recurve	5 September

=== Medals by sport ===
Medals by sport
Sport	1st place, gold medalist(s)	2nd place, silver medalist(s)	3rd place, bronze medalist(s)	Total
Shooting	1	0	0	1
Archery	0	0	1	1
Total	1	0	1	2

=== Medals by gender ===
Medals by gender
Gender	1st place, gold medalist(s)	2nd place, silver medalist(s)	3rd place, bronze medalist(s)	Total
Female	0	0	0	0
Male	1	0	0	1
Mixed	0	0	1	1
Total	1	0	1	2

=== Medals by date ===
Medals by date
Date	1st place, gold medalist(s)	2nd place, silver medalist(s)	3rd place, bronze medalist(s)	Total
30 August	1	0	0	1
5 September	0	0	1	1
Total	1	0	1	2

== Archery ==
Slovenia entered one athletes into the games by virtue of his result at the 2023 World Para Archery Championships in Plzeň, Czech Republic.

Athlete	Event	Ranking Round		Round of 32	Round of 16	Quarterfinals	Semifinals	Finals	
Athlete	Event	Score	Seed	Opposition Score	Opposition Score	Opposition Score	Opposition Score	Opposition Score	Rank
Dejan Fabcic	Men's individual recurve	615	15	Yavuz Papağan Turkey L 4-6	Did not advance				
Živa Lavrinc	Women's individual recurve	588	6	Bye	W 6-4	L 4-6	Did not advance		
Živa Lavrinc; Dejan Fabcic	Mixed team recurve			—N/a	Colombia; W 6–2	China; W 5–4	Turkey; L 4–5	India; W 5–4	3rd place, bronze medalist(s)

== Athletics ==
Field events
Men

Athlete	Event	Final	
Athlete	Event	Result	Rank
Henrik Plank	Discus throw F52	13.33	7

== Sitting volleyball ==
Slovenia women's national team entered the paralympic games by winning the qualification tournament.

Summary

Team	Event	Group Stage				Semifinal	Final / BM	
Team	Event	Opposition Score	Opposition Score	Opposition Score	Rank	Opposition Score	Opposition Score	Rank
Slovenia women's	Women's tournament							

== Shooting ==
Slovenia entered one para-shooter after achieved quota places for the following events by virtue of their best finishes at the 2022, 2023 and 2024 world cup, 2022 World Championships, 2023 World Championships, 2023 European Para Championships and 2024 European Championships, as long as they obtained a minimum qualifying score (MQS) by May 31, 2020.

Mixed

Athlete	Event	Qualification		Final	
Athlete	Event	Points	Rank	Points	Rank
Franček Gorazd Tiršek	R4 – 10 m air rifle standing SH2	631.2	6 Q	253.3 PR	1st place, gold medalist(s)

== See also ==
- Slovenia at the 2024 Summer Olympics
- Slovenia at the Paralympics
