= United Arab Emirates at the 1996 Summer Paralympics =

- Flag of the United Arab Emirates
- IPC code: UAE
- NPC: UAE Paralympic Committee

in Atlanta
- Competitors: 5
- Medals: Gold 0 Silver 0 Bronze 0 Total 0

Summer Paralympics appearances (overview)
- 1992; 1996; 2000; 2004; 2008; 2012; 2016; 2020; 2024

Five male athletes from the United Arab Emirates competed at the 1996 Summer Paralympics in Atlanta, United States.

== See also ==
- United Arab Emirates at the Paralympics
- United Arab Emirates at the 1996 Summer Olympics
