= Regina Terbuc Roudi =

Slovenian Paralympic volleyball player (born 1974)

Personal information
- Nationality: Slovenian
- Born: 13 June 1974 (age 52)

Volleyball information
- Number: 13

Career
Years	Teams
2012	(Slovenia) ISD Samorastnik

National team
2012	Slovenia sitting volleyball team

Regina Terbuc Roudi (born 13 June 1974) is a Slovenian female Paralympic sitting volleyball player. She is part of the Slovenia women's national sitting volleyball team.

She competed at the 2012 Summer Paralympics finishing 6th. On club level she played for ISD Samorastnik in 2012.

== See also ==
- Slovenia at the 2012 Summer Paralympics
