= Alenka Iršič =

Slovenian sitting volleyball player (born 1968)

Alenka Irsic

Personal information
- Nationality: Slovenian
- Born: 31 May 1968 (age 58)

Volleyball information
- Number: 7

Career
Years	Teams
2012	(Slovenia) ISD Samorastnik

National team
2012	Slovenia sitting volleyball team

Alenka Irsic (born 31 May 1968) is a Slovenian Paralympic sitting volleyball player. She is part of the Slovenia women's national sitting volleyball team.

She competed at the 2012 Summer Paralympics finishing 6th.

== See also ==
- Slovenia at the 2012 Summer Paralympics
