= Kim Su Wan =

South Korean paralympic sport shooter

Ku Su Wan
Sport
- Country: South Korea
- Sport: Paralympic shooting
- Disability class: SH1
Medal record
Representing South Korea
Paralympic Games
Men's shooting para sport
Bronze medal – third place	2016 Rio de Janeiro	Men's 10 m air rifle standing

Kim Su Wan is a South Korean paralympic sport shooter. He participated at the 2016 Summer Paralympics in the shooting competition, being awarded the bronze medal in the men's 10 m air rifle standing event.
