= Bogomira Jakin =

Slovenian sitting volleyball player (born 1957)

Personal information
- Nationality: Slovenian
- Born: 22 October 1957 (age 69)

Volleyball information
- Number: 4

Career
Years	Teams
2012	(Slovenia) ISD Nova Gorica

National team
2012	Slovenia sitting volleyball team

Bogomira Jakin (born 22 October 1957) is a Slovenian Paralympic sitting volleyball player. She is part of the Slovenia women's national sitting volleyball team.

She competed at the 2012 Summer Paralympics finishing 6th. On club level she played for ISD Nova Gorica in 2012.

== See also ==
- Slovenia at the 2012 Summer Paralympics
