= Juan Antonio Saavedra Reinaldo =

Spanish Paralympic sport shooter

Juan Antonio Saavedra
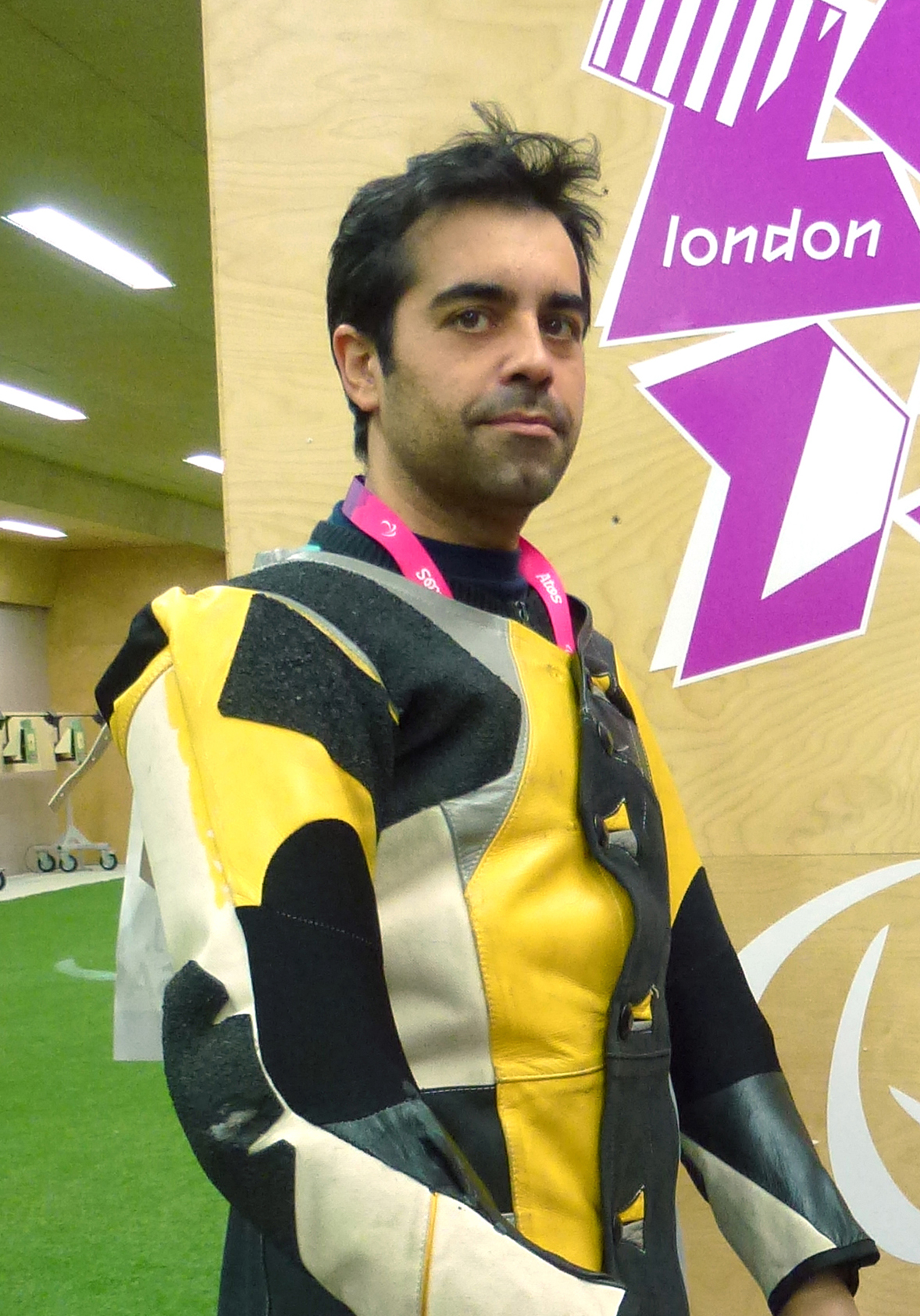

Personal information
- Full name: Juan Antonio Saavedra Reinaldo
- Born: 21 November 1973 (age 52) Pontevedra, Spain

Sport
- Country: Spain
- Sport: Shooting para sport
- Disability class: SH1
- Coached by: Manuel Sainz
Medal record
Shooting para sport
Representing Spain
Paralympic Games
Silver medal – second place	2012 London	Mixed 50 m rifle prone SH1
Bronze medal – third place	2024 Paris	Mixed 10 m air rifle prone SH1
European Para Championships
Silver medal – second place	2023 Rotterdam	Mixed 10 m air rifle prone SH1
Silver medal – second place	2023 Rotterdam	Mixed 10 m air rifle V1 prone SH-VI

Juan Antonio Saavedra Reinaldo (born 21 November 1973 in Pontevedra) is a shooter from Spain.

== Personal ==
He has a disability, and is Galician. In 2013, he was awarded the silver Real Orden al Mérito Deportivo.

== Shooting ==
Saavedra is an SH1-SH2 type shooter.

He competed at the 2000 Summer Paralympics, 2004 Summer Paralympics and 2012 Summer Paralympics. At the 2012 Games, he earned a silver in the Free rifle lying R6, Mixed gender SH1 event.

He competed at the 2013 Spanish national championships, where finished first in the R3 event by beating Catalan shooter Miquel Orobitg and fellow Galician Manuel Brage who finished third. He also finished first in the R5 event. Competing at the 2013 IPC European Championships, he finished first in the R3 event.
