= United Arab Emirates at the 1992 Summer Paralympics =

- Flag of the United Arab Emirates
- IPC code: UAE
- NPC: UAE Paralympic Committee

in Barcelona
- Competitors: 1
- Medals: Gold 0 Silver 0 Bronze 0 Total 0

Summer Paralympics appearances (overview)
- 1992; 1996; 2000; 2004; 2008; 2012; 2016; 2020; 2024

United Arab Emirates competed at the 1992 Summer Paralympics in Barcelona, Spain. The one competitor from United Arab Emirates won no medals and so did not place in the medal table.

== See also ==
- United Arab Emirates at the Paralympics
- United Arab Emirates at the 1992 Summer Olympics
