= Slovenia at the 2012 Summer Paralympics =

- IPC code: SLO
- NPC: Sports Federation for the Disabled of Slovenia
- Website: www.zsis.si

in London
- Competitors: 22 in 6 sports
- Medals Ranked 67th: Gold 0 Silver 1 Bronze 0 Total 1

Summer Paralympics appearances (overview)
- 1992; 1996; 2000; 2004; 2008; 2012; 2016; 2020; 2024

Other related appearances
- Yugoslavia (1972–2000)

Slovenia competed at the 2012 Summer Paralympics in London, United Kingdom, from 29 August to 9 September 2012. 22 sportsmen represented Slovenia in athletics, cycling, table tennis, volleyball, swimming and shooting.

== Medallists ==
Medal	Name	Sport	Event	Date
Silver	Franček Gorazd Tiršek	Shooting	Mixed 10 m air rifle standing SH2	2 September

== Athletics ==
Men's field events

Athlete	Event	Final	
Athlete	Event	Distance	Rank
Henrik Plank	Shot put F52-53	6.65 (357 pts)	7
Henrik Plank	Javelin throw F52-53	15.37 (757 pts)	4
Jože Flere	Discus throw F51-53	10.42 (761 pts)	5
Jože Flere	Club throw F31-32/51	21.32 (780 pts)	12

Women's field events

Athlete	Event	Final	
Athlete	Event	Distance	Rank
Tanja Cerkvenik	Shot put F54-56	684 (721 pts)	12
Tanja Cerkvenik	Javelin throw F54-56	18.64	7
Tatjana Majcen	Shot put F54-56	6.24 (894 pts)	6
Tatjana Majcen	Javelin throw F54-56	13.49	8

== Cycling ==
=== Road ===
Men

Athlete	Event	Time	Rank
Roman Pongrac	Road race C1-3	1:53:33	25
Roman Pongrac	Time trial C2	27:28.45	11

== Shooting ==
Athlete	Event	Qualification		Final	
Athlete	Event	Score	Rank	Score	Rank
Damjan Pavlin	Mixed 10 m air rifle prone SH2	600	3 Q	705.6	5
Damjan Pavlin	Mixed 10 m air rifle standing SH2	596	17	did not advance	
Franc Pinter	Men's 50 m rifle 3 positions SH1	1127	11	did not advance	
Franc Pinter	Men's 10 m air rifle standing SH1	590	7 Q	688.9	8
Franc Pinter	Mixed 50 m rifle prone SH1	577	31	did not advance	
Franc Pinter	Mixed 10 m air rifle prone SH1	598	18	did not advance	
Franček Gorazd Tiršek	Mixed 10 m air rifle prone SH2	590	29	did not advance	
Franček Gorazd Tiršek	Mixed 10 m air rifle standing SH2	599	5 Q	704.7	2nd place, silver medalist(s)

== Swimming ==
Men

Athletes	Event	Heat		Final	
Athletes	Event	Time	Rank	Time	Rank
Darko Đurić	50 m freestyle S4	39.71	4 Q	40.21	6
Darko Đurić	100 m freestyle S4	1:26.93	4 Q	1:26.12	5
Darko Đurić	200 m freestyle S4	3:06.75	6 Q	3:06.84	4
Darko Đurić	50 m butterfly S5	40.99	5 Q	40.48	5

== Table tennis ==
Women

Athlete	Event	Group stage			Round of 16	Quarterfinals	Semifinals	Final	
Athlete	Event	Opposition Result	Opposition Result	Rank	Opposition Result	Opposition Result	Opposition Result	Opposition Result	Rank
Mateja Pintar	Individual C3	Fillou (FRA); W 3–2	Duman (TUR); W 3–1	1 Q	—	Head (GBR); L 2–3	did not advance		
Andreja Dolinar	Individual C4	Zorzetto (ITA); L 1–3	Zhou (CHN); L 0–3	3	—		did not advance		
Mateja Pintar; Andreja Dolinar	Team C4-5	—			Bye	South Korea (KOR); L 0–3	did not advance		

== Volleyball ==
=== Women's tournament ===
Roster

The following is the Slovenian roster in the women's volleyball tournament of the 2012 Summer Paralympics.

№	Name	Date of birth	Position	2012 club
1	Anita Goltnik Urnaut	26 November 1964		(Slovenia) ISD Samorastnik
4	Bogomira Jakin	22 October 1957		(Slovenia) ISD Nova Gorica
5	Marinka Cencelj	22 January 1964		(Slovenia) ISD Invalid
6	Suzana Ocepek	24 November 1985		(Slovenia) ISD Nova Gorica
7	Alenka Iršič	31 May 1968		(Slovenia) ISD Samorastnik
8	Danica Goznak	14 February 1962		(Slovenia) ISD Samorastnik
9	Štefka Tomič	12 December 1961		(Slovenia) ISD Samorastnik
10	Saša Kotnik	16 September 1980		(Slovenia) ISD Samorastnik
11	Lena Gabršček	12 June 1994		(Slovenia) ISD Samorastnik
13	Regina Terbuc Roudi	13 June 1974		(Slovenia) ISD Samorastnik
16	Jasmina Zbil	20 December 1980		(Slovenia) ISD Nova Gorica

Group B

Pos	Team	Pld	W	L	Pts	SW	SL	SR	SPW	SPL	SPR
1	China	3	3	0	6	9	2	4.500	275	138	1.993
2	United States	3	2	1	5	7	2	3.500	245	187	1.310
3	Brazil	3	1	2	4	4	8	0.500	242	273	0.886
4	Slovenia	3	0	3	3	2	9	0.222	176	260	0.677

1 September 2012; 19:00	United States	3–0	Slovenia	ExCeL London, London; Referees: Masoud Yazdan Panah (IRI), France Marcoux (CAN)
1 September 2012; 19:00	(25–8, 25–15, 25–8); Report			ExCeL London, London; Referees: Masoud Yazdan Panah (IRI), France Marcoux (CAN)

2 September 2012; 16:00	Slovenia	2–3	Brazil	ExCeL London, London; Referees: Glynn Archibald (GBR), Toomas Murulo (EST)
2 September 2012; 16:00	(17–25, 28–30, 25–19, 25–21, 7–15); Report			ExCeL London, London; Referees: Glynn Archibald (GBR), Toomas Murulo (EST)

3 September 2012; 9:00	China	3–0	Slovenia	ExCeL London, London; Referees: Ute Fischer (GER), Adnan Kolos (BIH)
3 September 2012; 9:00	(25–12, 25–15, 25–16); Report			ExCeL London, London; Referees: Ute Fischer (GER), Adnan Kolos (BIH)

5th–8th place semi-finals

4 September 2012; 21:00	Japan	0–3	Slovenia	ExCeL London, London; Referees: France Marcoux (CAN), Dee Wauchope (GBR)
4 September 2012; 21:00	(19–25, 22–25, 20–25); Report			ExCeL London, London; Referees: France Marcoux (CAN), Dee Wauchope (GBR)

5th–6th place match

6 September 2012; 11:00	Brazil	3–1	Slovenia	ExCeL London, London; Referees: Mourad El-Baroudy (EGY), Stephen Giugni (AUS)
6 September 2012; 11:00	(25–16, 25–14, 21–25, 25–21); Report			ExCeL London, London; Referees: Mourad El-Baroudy (EGY), Stephen Giugni (AUS)

== See also ==
- Slovenia at the 2012 Summer Olympics
