= Joshua Olson =

American sport shooter

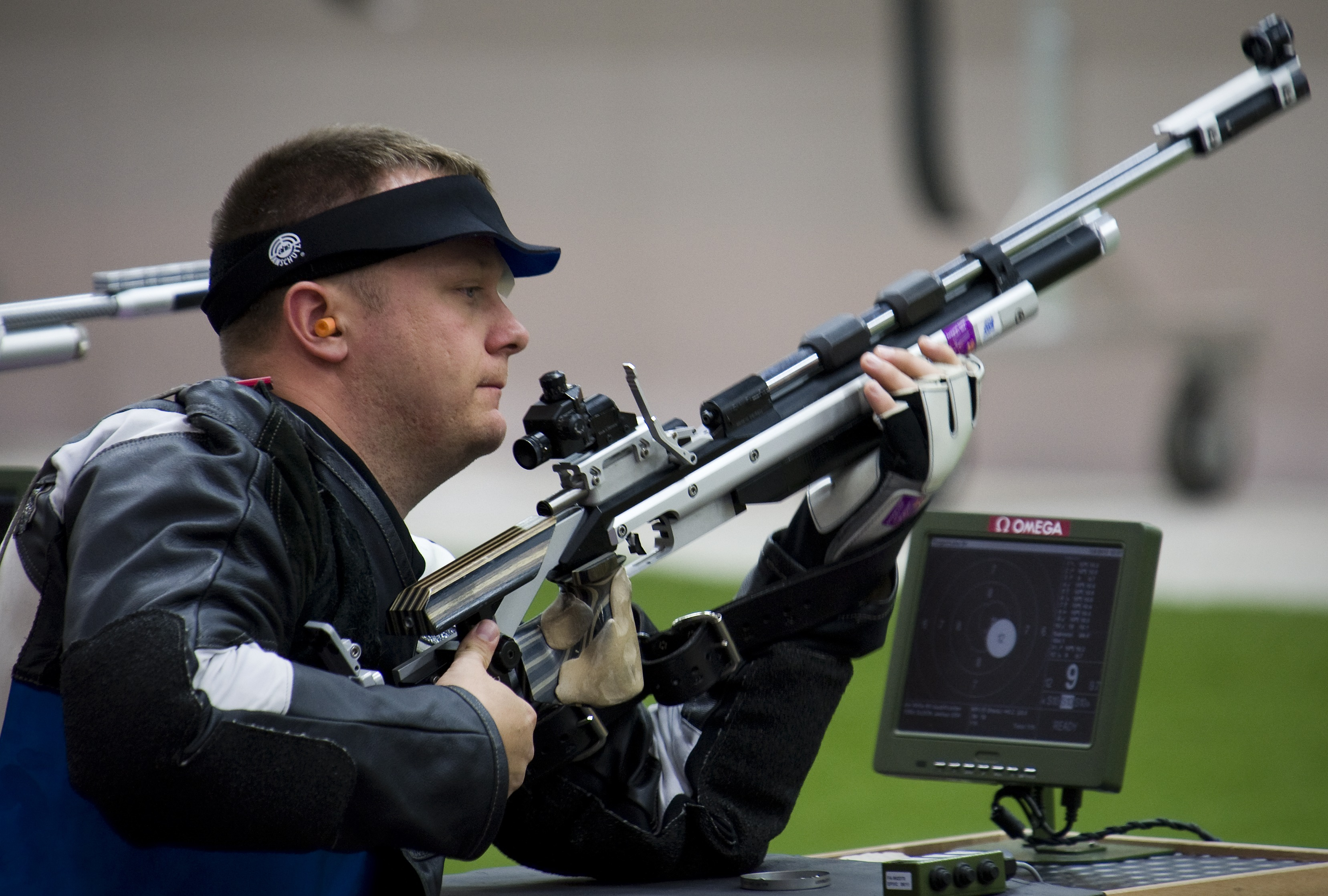
- Olson at the 2012 Paralympics

Personal information
- Nationality: American
- Born: August 21, 1979 (age 46) Spokane, Washington, U.S.

Sport
- Sport: Rifle shooting
- Club: U.S. Army
Medal record
Representing the United States
Para-shooting championships
Silver medal – second place	2009 Hessian Trophy	Shooting
Gold medal – first place	2009 French Grand Prix	Shooting
Gold medal – first place	2009 Alicante Cup	Shooting
Silver medal – second place	2009 Oceania Games	Shooting
Silver medal – second place	2011 IPC Approved Competition	R3 shooting
Gold medal – first place	2011 IPC Approved Competition	R6 shooting

Joshua Olson (born August 21, 1979) is a former American rifle shooter. He competed at the 2012 Paralympics and placed 12th in the mixed 50 m rifle prone SH1 event.

== Biography ==
=== Early life and Paralympics ===
Olson became a Paralympian after losing his leg to a rocket-propelled grenade in Iraq War in 2003. In June 2005, he was assigned as a marksman to Fort Benning, where practiced shotgun shooting. He said that in his first tryout outside he hit 49 out of 50. In 2009 he won silver medals at the Oceania Games and Hessian Trophy and gold medals at the French Grand Prix and Alicante Cup. He qualified for the 2012 Paralympics by winning a gold and a silver medal at an IPC Approved Competition in 2011.

=== Prosthesis development ===
Besides shooting Olson helped develop a prosthesis for wounded soldiers. In late 2004, he met a Prosthetics and Associates employee in Orlando, Florida; together they drew a design on a piece of napkin. As soon as he came back to Walter Reed Army Medical Center the officials liked the new prosthesis on him so much that they started sending copies to wounded soldiers in Florida.
