= United Arab Emirates at the 2008 Summer Paralympics =

- Flag of the United Arab Emirates
- IPC code: UAE
- NPC: UAE Paralympic Committee

in Beijing
- Competitors: 8 in 3 sports
- Medals Ranked 63rd: Gold 0 Silver 1 Bronze 0 Total 1

Summer Paralympics appearances (overview)
- 1992; 1996; 2000; 2004; 2008; 2012; 2016; 2020; 2024

The United Arab Emirates competed at the 2008 Summer Paralympics in Beijing, China. The Emirati delegation consisted of 24 people, of whom eight were competitors: six athletes, one powerlifter and one sport shooter. Other members of the delegation included representatives of the country's Athletes with Special Needs organization, led by Abdul Razak Ahmed al Rasheed. The Emirati team was sponsored by the Abu Dhabi–based Union National Bank.

== Medallists ==
The country won one medal, a silver.

Medal	Name	Sport	Event
Silver	Mohammed Khamiss Khalaf	Powerlifting	Men's -90 kg

== Sports ==
=== Athletics ===
==== Men's track ====
Athlete	Class	Event	Heats		Semifinal		Final	
Athlete	Class	Event	Result	Rank	Result	Rank	Result	Rank
Ali Qambar Ali Alansari	T37	100m	12.77	14	did not advance			
Ali Qambar Ali Alansari	T37	200m	25.64	12	did not advance			
Ibrahim Salim Banihammad	T54	800m	1:43.00	24	did not advance			
Ibrahim Salim Banihammad	T54	1500m	3:09.96	14 q	3:11.92	23	did not advance	
Mohammad Vahdani	T54	100m	14.48	7 q	—N/a		14.58	7
Mohammad Vahdani	T54	200m	25.37	5 Q	—N/a		25.86	6

==== Men's field ====
Athlete	Class	Event	Final		
Athlete	Class	Event	Result	Points	Rank
Almehai Bin Dabbas	F33-34/52	Discus throw	33.36	849	8
Almehai Bin Dabbas	F33-34/52	Javelin throw	28.72	1077	5
Almehai Bin Dabbas	F33-34/52	Shot put	9.37	869	15

==== Women's field ====
Athlete	Class	Event	Final		
Athlete	Class	Event	Result	Points	Rank
Thuraya Alzaabi	F32-34/51-53	Discus throw	13.34	631	16
Thuraya Alzaabi	F33-34/52-53	Javelin throw	13.82	973	8

=== Powerlifting ===
Athlete	Event	Result	Rank
Mohammed Khamiss Khalaf	90kg	227.5	2nd place, silver medalist(s)

=== Shooting ===
Athlete	Event	Qualification		Final		
Athlete	Event	Score	Rank	Score	Total	Rank
Ab Dulla Al Aryani	Men's 50m rifle 3 positions SH1	1124	14	did not advance		
Ab Dulla Al Aryani	Mixed 10m air rifle prone SH1	599	9	did not advance		

== See also ==
- United Arab Emirates at the Paralympics
- United Arab Emirates at the 2008 Summer Olympics
