= Aybaniz Babayeva =

Azerbaijani Paralympian in sport shooting

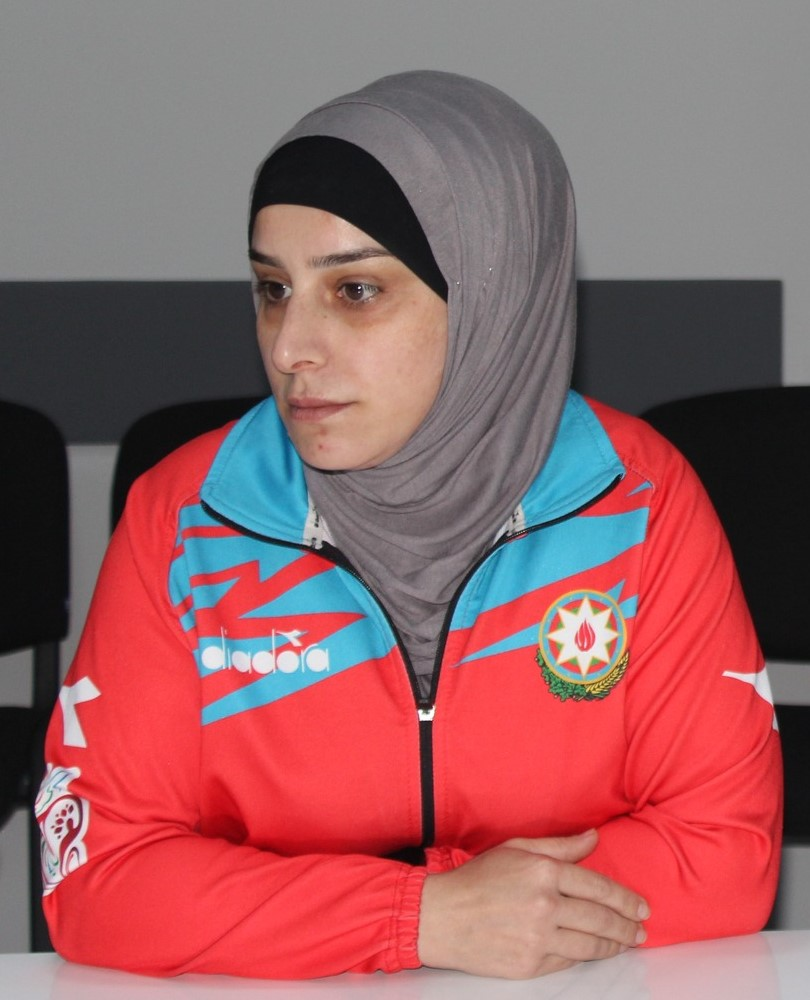
- Babayeva in 2023

Personal information
- Born: 24 August 1988 (age 37)

Sport
- Sport: Shooting

Aybaniz Jalal gizi Babayeva (Azerbaijani: Aybəniz Cəlal qızı Babayeva; born 24 August 1988) is an Azerbaijani athlete specializing in sport shooting as a Paralympic shooter. She won a silver medalist at the 2023 World Championship, and a bronze medalist at the 2023 European Championship and represented Azerbaijan at the 2024 Summer Paralympic Games in Paris.

== Biography ==
Aybaniz Babayeva was born on 24 August 1988. She graduated from the Faculty of Law at Baku State University.

In June 2022, she participated in the World Cup in Châteauroux, France. In May 2023, Babayeva competed in an international tournament in Hanover, Germany where she earned a bronze medal in the team event with Yelena Taranova and Kamran Zeynalov in the 50m shooting competition, and second place in the 10m air pistol (P2) event. In July 2023, she won a bronze medal at the Grand Prix in Novi Sad, Serbia, in the 10m shooting event with a score of 544. In August 2023, Babayeva earned a bronze medal in the 10m shooting event at the European Championship in Rotterdam, Netherlands. In September 2023, she and Kamran Zeynalov won a silver medal in the 10m shooting event (P6, mix) at the World Championship in Lima, Peru. In February 2024, Babayeva secured a qualification spot for the 2024 Summer Paralympic Games. In the 2024 Paris Paralympic Games, Babayeva competed in the P2 – Women's 10m Air Pistol SH1 event, where she ranked 13th, and the P4 – Mixed 50m Pistol SH1 event, where she ranked 26th for Azerbaijan.
