= Joseph Radmore =

Canadian Paralympic athlete

Medal record

Track and field (athletics)

Representing Canada

Paralympic Games
Silver medal – second place	1996 Atlanta	100 metres - T33

Joseph Radmore is a paralympic athlete from Canada competing mainly in category T52 sprint events.

Joseph has competed in three Paralympics. His first in 1996 was his most successful, winning a silver in the 100m as well as competing in the 400m. In the 2000 Summer Paralympics he competed in all three sprints but was unable to win any medals. He also failed to win a medal in the 100m in the 2004 Summer Paralympics.
