= Veronika Vadovičová =

Slovak Paralympic sport shooter

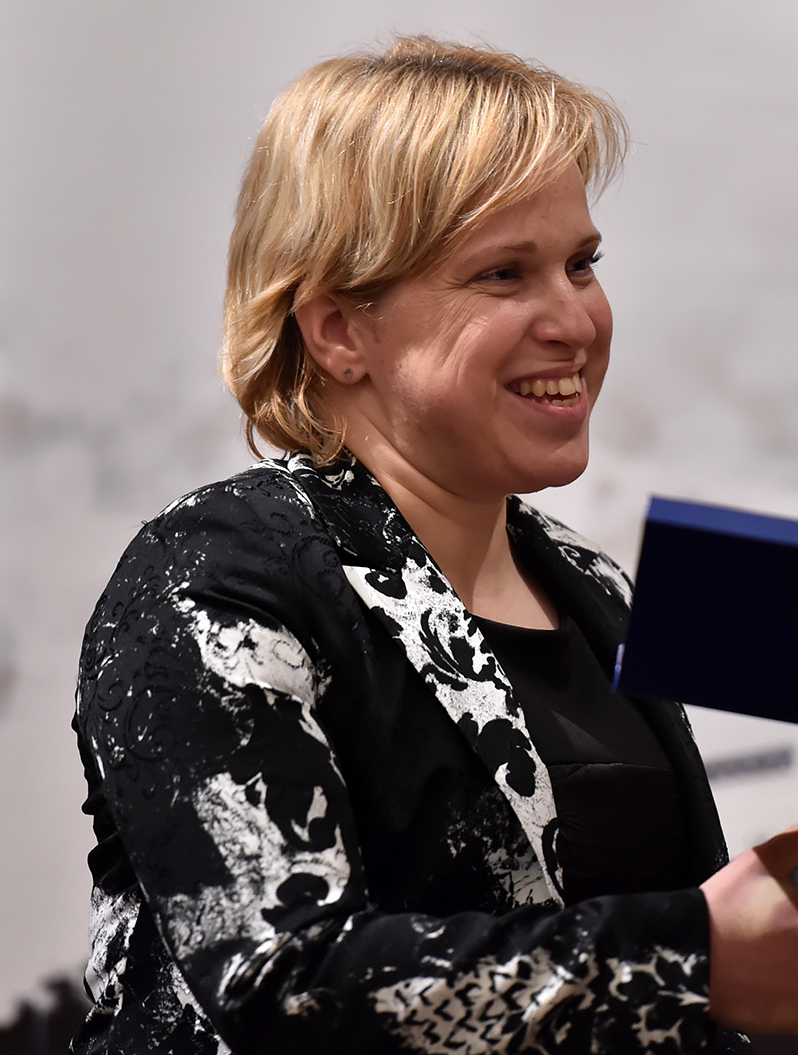
- Vadovičová in 2016

Personal information
- Nationality: Slovak
- Born: 9 February 1983 (age 43) Trnava, Czechoslovakia
- Home town: Šelpice
- Education: Univerzita Palackého v Olomouci; Vysoká škola zdravotníctva a sociálnej práce sv. Alžbety v Bratislave; Univerzita Komenského v Bratislave
- Height: 148 cm (4 ft 10 in)

Sport
- Country: Slovakia
- Sport: Shooting para sport
- Disability class: SH1
- Event: R3, R6, R8
- Club: ŠK Altius Bratislava
- Coached by: (Slovakia) Milan Goleňa

Achievements and titles
- Personal best(s): R3 639.7 WR (2016); R6 Mixed 50 metre rifle prone 248,9 PR (2021)
Medal record
Women's shooting para sport
Representing Slovakia
Paralympic Games
Gold medal – first place	2008 Beijing	10 m air rifle standing SH1
Gold medal – first place	2016 Rio	10 m air rifle standing SH1
Gold medal – first place	2016 Rio	Mixed 10 m air rifle prone SH1
Gold medal – first place	2020 Tokyo	Mixed 50 m rifle prone SH1
Gold medal – first place	2024 Paris	Mixed 10 m air rifle prone SH1
Silver medal – second place	2016 Rio	50 m rifle 3 positions SH1
Silver medal – second place	2024 Paris	50 m rifle 3 positions SH1
Bronze medal – third place	2012 London	50 m rifle 3 positions SH1
European Para Championships
Gold medal – first place	2023 Rotterdam	Mixed 10 m air rifle V1 prone SH-VI
Gold medal – first place	2023 Rotterdam	Mixed 10 m air rifle prone SH1
Silver medal – second place	2023 Rotterdam	10 m air rifle standing SH1

Veronika Vadovičová (born 9 February 1983) is a Slovak Paralympic shooter. A seven-time Paralympian, she has won medals at every Paralympics between 2008 and 2024. Among these, she has five gold medals, two silvers and one bronze.

== Career ==
Vadovičová competed in a single event in the 2000 Summer Paralympics in Sydney, before going to Athens four years later to take part in four events for the 2004 Summer Paralympics at the age of 21.

She was a gold medalist at the 2006 World Shooting Championships where she competed in three-position 50-metre rifle event.

At the 2008 Paralympic Games in Beijing, China, she won the gold medal in the 10 m air rifle standing SH1.

At the 2012 Paralympic Games in London, England, she won her second career Paralympic medal: a bronze in the 50 m rifle 3 positions SH1.

Vadovičová won 3 golds at the 2014 IPC Shooting World Cup in Fort Benning, Georgia where she competed against Matt Skelhon. On 24 October 2014 she won a gold medal at the 2014 IPC Shooting European Championships.

On 15 March 2016 Vadovičová broke the R3 (mixed 10m air rifle prone SH1) qualification world record, on the opening day of competition, at the IPC Shooting World Cup in Bangkok, Thailand. She competed at the 2016 Summer Paralympics, winning two further gold medals as well as a silver medal.

Vadovičová took the gold medal in the 2017 Para Sport World Cup held in the UAE beating Lorraine Lambert who gained the silver position.

She competed at the 2020 Summer Paralympics, in Mixed R6 50 metre rifle prone SH1, winning a gold medal.

Vadovičová was the most successful Slovak representative at the 2024 Summer Paralympics in Paris, winning a gold medal in the R3 10 m air rifle prone event, as well as a silver medal for the R8 50 m rifle 3 positions. These two medals took her eight Paralympic medals overall, won from five different Paralympics.
