= Jean-Pierre Talatini =

French Paralympic athlete

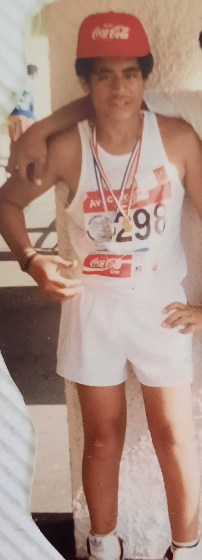

Personal information
- Born: 18 April 1976 (age 50) Nouméa, New Caledonia
Medal record
Men's para athletics
Representing France
Paralympic Games
Bronze medal – third place	2008 Beijing	Javelin throw F33/34/52

Jean-Pierre Talatini (born 18 April 1976) is a Paralympian athlete from France competing mainly in category F34 throwing events.

He competed in the 2008 Summer Paralympics in Beijing, China. There he won a bronze medal in the men's F33-34/52 javelin throw event but failed to medal in the shot put in the same category.
