= Kyle Pettey =

Canadian Paralympic athlete

Medal record

Paralympic athletics

Representing Canada

Paralympic Games
Silver medal – second place	2000 Sydney	Discus Throw - F35
Silver medal – second place	2000 Sydney	Shot put - F35
Bronze medal – third place	2008 Beijing	Shot put - F33-34/52

Commonwealth Games
Gold medal – first place	2010 Delhi	Shot put F32/34/52

Parapan American Games
Gold medal – first place	2007 Rio de Janeiro	Shot put F32-34/52
Bronze medal – third place	2015 Toronto	Shot put F32/33/34

Kyle Pettey is a Paralympian athlete from Canada competing mainly in category F35 shot put events.

In the 2000 Summer Paralympics Kyle competed in the F35 javelin and won silver medals in the F35 discus and shot put. Four years later competing in the F35 shot and discus he failed to win any medals but in 2008 he won the bronze in the F33-34/52 shot put.
