= Matt Skelhon =

British sport shooter (born 1984)

Medal record

Men's shooting para sport

Representing Great Britain

Summer Paralympic Games
Gold medal – first place	2008 Beijing	Mixed 10 m air rifle prone SH1
Silver medal – second place	2012 London	Mixed 10 m air rifle prone SH1
Bronze medal – third place	2012 London	Mixed 50 m air rifle prone SH1

European Para Championships
Bronze medal – third place	2023 Rotterdam	Mixed 10 m air rifle prone SH1
Bronze medal – third place	2023 Rotterdam	Mixed 10 m air rifle V1 prone SH-VI

Matthew James Skelhon (born 30 October 1984) is a British sport shooter. At the 2008 Summer Paralympics he won the gold medal in the SH1 10 metre prone air rifle event.

== Life ==
Skelhon lost the use of his legs following a car accident. He competes in the SH1 Paralympic classification for pistol and rifle competitors that do not require a shooting stand. He started shooting competitively when he joined the Disabled Target Shooting Association of Great Britain in April 2006 after discovering his talent at the WheelPower Inter Spinal Unit Games. Two months later he won a silver medal in the national championships. He became a member of Whittlesey Rifle Club and was named as part of a four-man shooting squad for Great Britain at the 2008 Summer Paralympics.

At the Games Skelhon competed in two events; the men's standing air rifle and the mixed-sex prone air rifle. He finished 18th of 26 athletes in the qualification round of the standing air rifle and did not advance to the medal round. In the qualification round of the prone air rifle Skelhon and Chinese shooter Zhang Cuiping each shot a perfect 600 out of 600 to equal the world record. In the 10-shot medal round Skelhon shot a further 104.9 for a total score of 704.9, enough to beat Zhang by half a point and win the gold medal. On his return from the Games to his home village of Stilton Skelhon was greeted by more than 200 friends, relatives and fans lining streets decked with balloons and banners. In December 2008 he was presented with the Outstanding Individual Achievement award at the 13th annual British Wheelchair Sports Awards.

In 2009 he won a gold medal in the 10 m air rifle prone SH1 and a silver in 10 m air rifle standing SH1 at the Polish Open and four silver medals at the Wheelpower National Shooting Championship. Competing alongside Nathan Milgate and Deanna Coates Skelhon took gold in the team 10 m air rifle prone SH1 at the 2010 World Cup event in Turkey. At the same event he won silver in the individual 10 m air rifle prone SH1 and bronze in the falling target rifle SH1.

== See also ==
- Great Britain at the 2008 Summer Paralympics
- Shooting at the 2008 Summer Paralympics
