= Ben Jesson =

British sport shooter (born 1988)

Benjamin Jesson
Personal information
- Born: 19 February 1988 (age 38) Redhill, England

Sport
- Country: United Kingdom
- Sport: Shooting
- Event: Air rifle
- Club: Balcombe Rifle and Pistol Club
- Turned pro: 2011
- Coached by: Pasan Kularatne

Achievements and titles
- Paralympic finals: 2012

Benjamin Jesson (born 19 February 1988) is a British sport shooter. In 2012 he represented Great Britain at the Summer Paralympics in London taking part in the Mixed R6–50 m rifle prone SH1.

== Personal history ==
Jesson was born in Redhill, England in 1988. At the age of 15 he was diagnosed with Charcot–Marie–Tooth disease a hereditary nervous system disorder, which caused foot drop in both of his feet. He attended Hazelwick School in Crawley, later matriculating to Aberdeen University where he achieved a degree in marine biology.

== Shooting career ==
Jesson was introduced to both sports shooting and archery at Aberdeen University in 2006. He decided to focus on shooting because it piqued his interests the most, finding it mentally challenging. Classified as an SH1 athlete, Jesson joined the Great Britain shooting team in 2011 and that year competed in his first major international competition, the 2011 IPC World Cup in Alicante. In Alicante he was entered into the 10m Air Rifle Prone mixed SH1, finishing 45th. 2011 also saw Jesson competing in the International Shooting Competition at Stoke Mandeville where he came 22nd in the same event.

In 2012 Jesson qualified for the Summer Paralympics in London, competing in the 50m Free Rifle Prone SH1. Before the competition Jesson expressed his desire to make the final eight, believing that making the British team for the Paralympics was an amazing achievement. He eventually finished 47th, later stating that the London Games were "not the best of my performances".

At the 2013 European Championships he achieved a personal best finishing in the top 15. In 2015 at the IPC Shooting World Cup in Croatia, Jesson finished 9th in the R6 Mixed 50m rifle prone SH1 gaining a quota slot for the 2016 Summer Paralympics in Rio.
