= Robert Jesson =

English cricketer

Personal information
- Full name: Robert Wilfred Fairey Jesson
- Born: 17 June 1886; Southampton, Hampshire, England
- Died: 22 February 1917 (aged 30) near Kut, Ottoman Empire
- Batting: Right-handed
- Bowling: Leg break

Domestic team information
- Years: Team
- 1907–1908: Hampshire
- 1908: Oxford University

Career statistics
Competition	First-class
Matches	15
Runs scored	198
Batting average	8.25
100s/50s	–/–
Top score	38
Balls bowled	882
Wickets	21
Bowling average	25.14
5 wickets in innings	1
10 wickets in match	–
Best bowling	5/42
Catches/stumpings	8/–
- Source: Cricinfo, 2 February 2010

Robert Wilfred Fairey Jesson (17 June 1886 – 22 February 1917) was an English first-class cricketer and British Army officer.

The son of Robert Jesson, a solicitor's clerk, he was born at Southampton in June 1886. He was firstly educated in Southampton at Handel College, before attending Sherborne School, where he played for the school cricket team. From Sherborne, he matriculated to Merton College, Oxford. Having appeared in the freshman's match at Oxford in 1907, Jesson made his debut in first-class cricket in the summer of the same year for Hampshire against Warwickshire at Southampton in the County Championship. He met with success on debut, taking a five wicket haul in Warwickshire's first innings. He made a further ten appearances for Hampshire in 1907, taking 17 wickets at an average of 28.66 in the season with his leg break bowling. In 1908, he made what was to be his only first-class appearance for Oxford University, against the Marylebone Cricket Club at Lord's. He made a further two first-class appearances for Hampshire in the 1908 County Championship, before making a final appearance in the 1910 County Championship against Sussex. His overall first-class career for Hampshire saw him take 21 wickets and score 198 runs, with a highest score of 38. Outside of cricket, Jesson played rugby union for both the Trojans and Rosslyn Park.

After graduating from Oxford, he worked in Southampton as a managing clerk with Hepherd & Winstanley. Jesson served in the First World War, being commissioned as a temporary second lieutenant on 26 August 1914. 22 days later he was posted to the 5th (Service) Battalion, Wiltshire Regiment, with promotion to temporary lieutenant following in December. He was made a temporary captain in March 1915, and saw action that year during the Gallipoli campaign, being wounded in action in August. He returned to his regiment in October, but was invalided home with shell shock shortly after. Jesson returned to action in July 1916, when he took part in the Mesopotamian campaign. He received his final appointment in September 1916, when he was made a temporary major whilst second in command of a battalion. Jesson was killed in action by an Ottoman sniper on 22 February 1917 near Kut, one day before the commencement of the Second Battle of Kut.
