= Shim Young-jip =

South Korean paralympic sport shooter

Sport
- Country: South Korea
- Sport: Paralympic shooting
Medal record
Men's shooting para sport
Representing South Korea
Paralympic Games
Bronze medal – third place	2020 Tokyo	Men's 50 metre rifle 3 positions

Shim Young-jip is a South Korean paralympic sport shooter. He competed in the shooting competition at the 2020 Summer Paralympics, winning the bronze medal in the men's 50 metre rifle 3 positions event. Young-jip also took part in the shooting competition at the 2012 Summer Paralympics.
