= Roman Musil =

Czech Paralympic cyclist and athlete

Personal information
- Born: 31 May 1971 (age 55) Teplice, Czechoslovakia
Medal record
Representing Czech Republic
Paralympic Games
Para-athletics
Gold medal – first place	2000 Sydney	Javelin Throw – F33
Gold medal – first place	2000 Sydney	Shot Put – F33
Gold medal – first place	2004 Athens	Shot Put – F33-34
Silver medal – second place	2000 Sydney	Discus Throw – F33
Bronze medal – third place	2008 Beijing	Discus Throw - F33/34/52
Para-cycling
Gold medal – first place	2000 Sydney	Mixed Tricycle 5.4km Time Trial - CP Div 2
Bronze medal – third place	2000 Sydney	Mixed Tricycle 1.9km Time Trial - CP Div 2

Roman Musil (born 31 May 1971) is a Czech Paralympic athlete and cyclist competing mainly in category F33 throwing events.

Musil has competed in three Paralympics over two sports. In 2000 he won two gold medals and a silver in the athletics class F33 javelin (gold), shot put (gold), and discus (silver) as well as a gold and bronze in the cycling class CP division 2 Mixed Tricycle 5.4 km time Trial (gold) and Mixed Tricycle 1.9 km Time Trial. This would be his last time entering cycling events as in 2004 he won the gold in the shot put F33/34 class but missed out in the discus. In the 2008 edition he competed in the combined F33/34/52 class javelin and shot up and won his seventh medal, a bronze, in the discus.
