= United Arab Emirates at the 2016 Summer Paralympics =

- Flag of the United Arab Emirates
- IPC code: UAE
- NPC: UAE Paralympic Committee

in Rio de Janeiro
- Competitors: 18 in 3 sports
- Medals Ranked 38th: Gold 2 Silver 4 Bronze 1 Total 7

Summer Paralympics appearances (overview)
- 1992; 1996; 2000; 2004; 2008; 2012; 2016; 2020; 2024

The United Arab Emirates sent athletes to the 2016 Summer Paralympics in Rio de Janeiro, Brazil, from 7 September to 18 September 2016.

== Disability classifications ==
Every participant at the Paralympics has their disability grouped into one of five disability categories; amputation, the condition may be congenital or sustained through injury or illness; cerebral palsy; wheelchair athletes, there is often overlap between this and other categories; visual impairment, including blindness; Les autres, any physical disability that does not fall strictly under one of the other categories, for example dwarfism or multiple sclerosis. Each Paralympic sport then has its own classifications, dependent upon the specific physical demands of competition. Events are given a code, made of numbers and letters, describing the type of event and classification of the athletes competing. Some sports, such as athletics, divide athletes by both the category and severity of their disabilities, other sports, for example swimming, group competitors from different categories together, the only separation being based on the severity of the disability.

== Archery ==
The country sent athletes to the 2015 International Wheelchair and Amputee Sports Federation (IWAS) World Games in Sochi, Russia as part of their 2016 qualifying campaign.

== Athletics ==
Several athletics from the United Arab Emirates were in the qualification hunt for the 2016 Games. Part of their qualification efforts involved participating in the Athletics IPC Grand Prix Competition 2014. Among these athletes was 2004 Paralympian and world record holder Hamda Al Hosni, who has had epilepsy since she was two years old. Other UAE athletes working on their qualifying campaign at the event include Siham Al Rasheedi and Aisha Al Khalidy. Siham is a member of the Dubai Club for the Disabled and competed at the 2012 Summer Paralympics. Aisha is a member of Khor Fakkan Club and competed at the 2013 IPC Athletics World Championships.

Thuraya Al Zaabi, the first woman to represent the UAE at the Paralympics when she represented the country in 2008, attempted to qualify for Rio at the Doha 2015 IPC Athletics World Championships in the javelin and shot put. She took up sport at the age of 29 after having a stroke.

The country sent athletes to the 2015 International Wheelchair and Amputee Sports Federation (IWAS) World Games in Sochi, Russia as part of their 2016 qualifying campaign.

== Shooting ==
The first opportunity to qualify for shooting at the Rio Games took place at the 2014 IPC Shooting World Championships in Suhl. Shooters earned spots for their NPC. The United Arab Emirates earned a qualifying spot at this competition in the R7 – 50m rifle 3 positions Men SH1 event as a result of Obaid Aldahmani winning a bronze medal. Abdulla Sultan Alaryani gave the UAE a second berth for Rio in the R3 – 10Mm Air Rifle Prone Mix SH1 event. Abdulla Saif Alaryani finishing gave the country a third shooting spot in Rio after his finish in the R6 – 50m Rifle Prone Mixed SH1 event.

The third opportunity for direct qualification for shooters to the Rio Paralympics took place at the 2015 IPC IPC Shooting World Cup in Sydney, Australia. At this competition, Saif Alnuaimi earned a qualifying spot for their country in the R6- Mixed 50m Rifle Prone SH1 event.

== Swimming ==
The country sent athletes to the 2015 International Wheelchair and Amputee Sports Federation (IWAS) World Games in Sochi, Russia as part of their 2016 qualifying campaign.

== Table tennis ==
The country sent athletes to the 2015 International Wheelchair and Amputee Sports Federation (IWAS) World Games in Sochi, Russia as part of their 2016 qualifying campaign.

== See also ==
- United Arab Emirates at the 2016 Summer Olympics
