= Ahmed Saif Zaal Abu Muhair =

United Arab Emirati Paralympic athlete

Medal record

Paralympic athletics

Representing United Arab Emirates

Paralympic Games
Silver medal – second place	2000 Sydney	400 metres - T36
Bronze medal – third place	2000 Sydney	200 metres - T36

Ahmed Saif Zaal Al Muhairi is a paralympic athlete from United Arab Emirates competing mainly in category T36 track events.

Ahmed competed in Sydney, Australia at the 2000 Summer Paralympics where he competed in the 800m and won a silver in the 400m and a bronze in the 200m.
