= Mana Abdulla Sulaiman =

United Arab Emirati Paralympic athlete

Medal record

Paralympic athletics

Representing United Arab Emirates

Paralympic Games
Silver medal – second place	2004 Athens	Shot Put - F32

Mana Addullah Sulaiman is a paralympic athlete from United Arab Emirates competing mainly in category F32 or F51 throwing events.

Mana competed in the 2000 Summer Paralympics in the F51 club throw and discus but failed to win any medals. Four years later at the 2004 Summer Paralympics he competed out of his wheelchair in the F32 shot put winning a silver medal.
