= Dong Chao =

Chinese para sport shooter (born 1985)

Personal information
- Born: 13 December 1985 (age 40)

Sport
- Country: China
- Sport: Shooting para sport
- Disability class: SH1
- Event: Rifle
Medal record
Men's shooting para sport
Representing China
Paralympic Games
Gold medal – first place	2012 London	10 m air rifle standing SH1
Gold medal – first place	2016 Rio	10 m air rifle standing SH1
Gold medal – first place	2020 Tokyo	10 m air rifle standing SH1
Silver medal – second place	2024 Paris	50 m rifle 3 positions SH1
Bronze medal – third place	2008 Beijing	Free Rifle 3x40 SH1
Bronze medal – third place	2008 Beijing	Mixed Free Rifle Prone SH1
Bronze medal – third place	2012 London	50 m rifle 3 positions SH1
World Championships
Gold medal – first place	2019 Sydney	Men's 10m Air Rifle Standing SH1
Silver medal – second place	2010 Zagreb	Men's 50m Rifle 3 Positions SH1
Bronze medal – third place	2019 Sydney	Men's 50m Rifle 3 Positions SH1
Bronze medal – third place	2019 Sydney	Mixed R10 - 10m Air Rifle Standing SH1 - Team
Asian Para Games
Bronze medal – third place	2018 Jakarta	10 m air rifle
Bronze medal – third place	2022 Hangzhou	10 m air rifle

Dong Chao (Chinese: 董超; pinyin: Dǒng Chāo; born 13 December 1985) is a Chinese para sport shooter.

== Career ==
Chao won a gold medal in the shooting competition at the 2016 Summer Paralympics. He also won the gold at the 2012 Summer Paralympics. Chao won gold at the Men's 10 metre air rifle standing SH1.
