= Cédric Fèvre-Chevalier =

French Paralympic shooter

Medal record

Men's shooting para sport

Representing France

Paralympic Games
Gold medal – first place	2012 London	Mixed 10 m air rifle prone SH1

Cédric Fèvre-Chevalier (born 1 November 1983 in Dijon) is a Paralympic sports-shooter. He was born with a malformed spinal column. At thirteen he won his first national French title. He won gold in the Mixed 10 metre air rifle prone SH1 event at the 2012 Summer Paralympics.
