= Shooting at the 2012 Summer Paralympics – Mixed 10 metre air rifle prone SH1 =

Mixed 10 metre air rifle prone SH1 at the XIV Paralympic Games
- Venue: Royal Artillery Barracks
- Dates: 1 September

Medalists
1st place, gold medalist(s)		Cédric Fèvre	France
2nd place, silver medalist(s)		Matthew Skelhon	Great Britain
3rd place, bronze medalist(s)		Cuiping Zhang	China

The Mixed 10 metre air rifle prone SH1 event at the 2012 Summer Paralympics took take place on 1 September at the Royal Artillery Barracks in Woolwich.

The event consists of two rounds: a qualifier and a final. In the qualifier, each shooter fires 60 shots with an air rifle at 10 metres distance from the prone position. Scores for each shot are in increments of 1, with a maximum score of 10.

The top 8 shooters in the qualifying round move on to the final round. There, they fire an additional 10 shots. These shots score in increments of .1, with a maximum score of 10.9. The total score from all 70 shots is used to determine final ranking.

== Qualification round ==
Rank	Athlete	Country	1	2	3	4	5	6	Total	Notes
1										

Q Qualified for final

== Final ==
Rank	Athlete	Country	Qual	1	2	3	4	5	6	7	8	9	10	Final	Total
1	Cédric Fèvre	France	600	10.4	10.7	10.8	10.8	10.7	10.4	10.9	10.7	10.7	10.6	106.7	706.7
2	Matthew Skelhon	Great Britain	600	10.8	10.5	10.7	10.8	10.4	10.8	10.2	10.9	10.7	10.6	106.4	706.4
3	Cuiping Zhang	China	600	10.6	10.8	10.6	10.5	10.9	10.6	10.8	9.7	10.6	10.7	105.8	705.8
4	Jae-Young Sim	South Korea	600	10.6	10.8	10.4	10.6	10.6	10.5	10.4	10.6	10.6	10.5	105.6	705.6
5	Azzurra Ciani	Italy	600	10.5	10.7	10.6	10.5	10.6	10.6	10.3	10.9	9.9	10.3	104.9	704.9
6	Natascha Hiltrop	Germany	600	10.5	10.6	10.2	10.6	10.4	10.7	10.4	10.7	10.2	10.1	104.4	704.4
7	Reinaldo Saavedra	Brazil	600	10.3	10.8	10.6	10.4	10.6	10.1	10.7	10.2	10.3	10.3	104.3	704.3
8	Sergey Nochevnoy	Russia	600	10.8	10.3	10.9	10.5	10.2	10.5	9.6	10.6	10.2	10.5	104.1	704.1
