= Naseib Obaid Sebait Araidat =

United Arab Emirati Paralympic athlete

Medal record

Track and field (athletics)

Representing United Arab Emirates

Paralympic Games
Silver medal – second place	2000 Sydney	400 metres - T52

Naseib Obaid Sebait Araidat is a paralympic athlete from United Arab Emirates competing mainly in category T52 sprint events.

Naseib competed in all three sprint events at the 2000 Summer Paralympics in Sydney, Australia. He won a silver medal in the T52 400m.
