= Nathan Milgate =

British Paralympic sport shooter

- Born: Canterbury, Kent, England
- Occupation: Olympic Marksman

Nathan Milgate (born 10 May 1987) is a marksman from Herne Bay who competed in the 2008 Summer Paralympics in Beijing.
