= Mohamed Hammadi =

United Arab Emirati Paralympic athlete

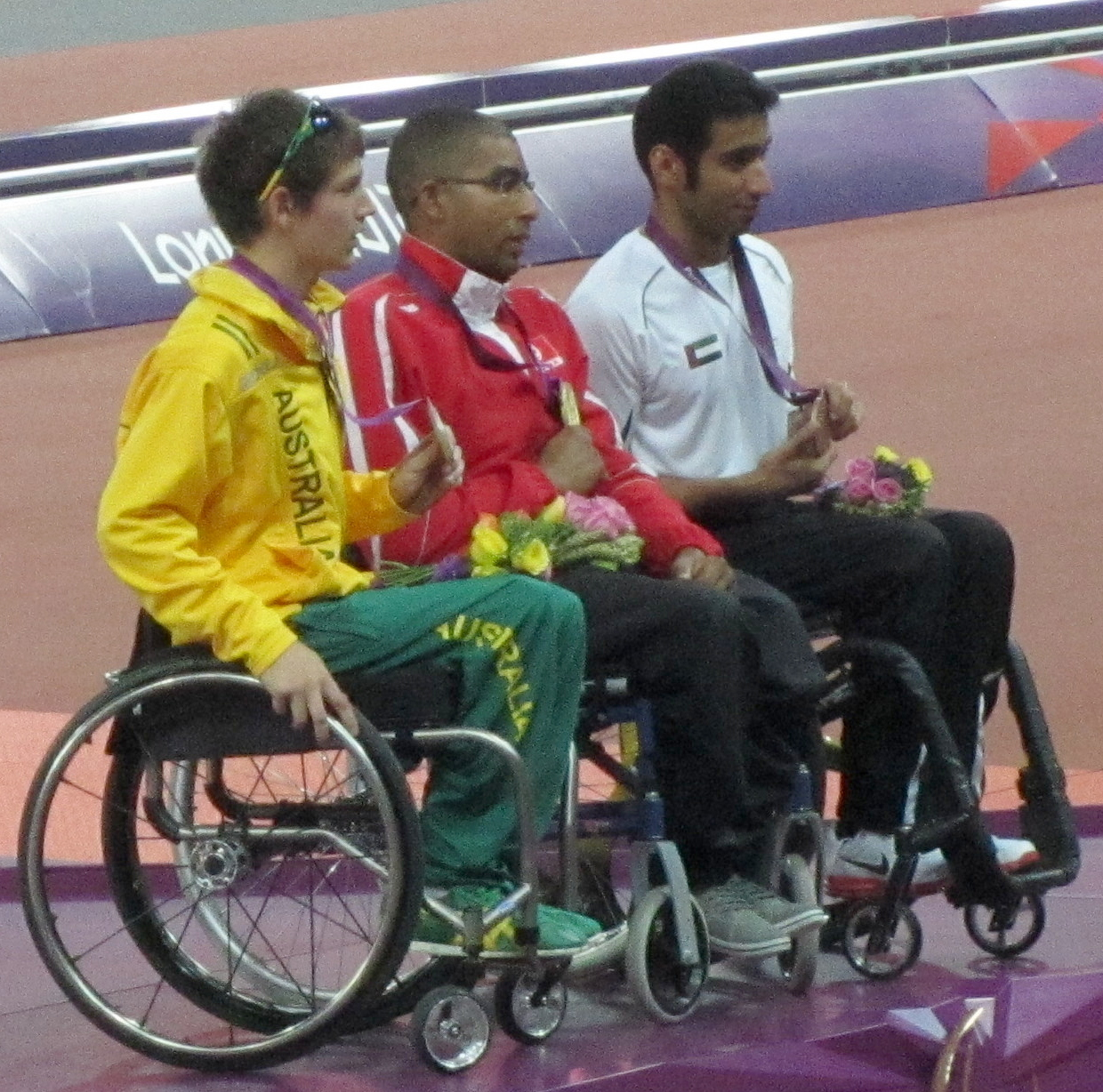
- Hammadi (right) at the 2012 Paralympics

Personal information
- Born: Mohamed Hammadi; 13 July 1985 (age 41)

Sport
- Sport: Paralympic athletics
- Disability: cerebral palsy
- Disability class: T34
- Event: 100–800 m
Medal record
Representing United Arab Emirates
Paralympic Games
| Gold medal – first place | 2016 Rio de Janeiro | 800 m T34 |
| Silver medal – second place | 2012 London | 200 m T34 |
| Silver medal – second place | 2020 Tokyo | 800 m T34 |
| Bronze medal – third place | 2012 London | 100 m T34 |
| Bronze medal – third place | 2020 Tokyo | 100 m T34 |
World Championships
| Silver medal – second place | 2011 Christchurch | 100 m T34 |
| Gold medal – first place | 2011 Christchurch | 200 m T34 |
| Gold medal – first place | 2011 Christchurch | 400 m T34 |
| Gold medal – first place | 2024 Kobe | 400 m T34 |
| Silver medal – second place | 2013 Lyon | 800 m T34 |
| Silver medal – second place | 2015 Doha | 100 m T34 |
| Silver medal – second place | 2015 Doha | 200 m T34 |
| Silver medal – second place | 2015 Doha | 800 m T34 |
| Silver medal – second place | 2023 Paris | 400 m T34 |
| Silver medal – second place | 2023 Paris | 800 m T34 |
| Bronze medal – third place | 2015 Doha | 400 m T34 |
Asian Para Games
| Gold medal – first place | 2014 Incheon | 100m T34 |
| Gold medal – first place | 2018 Jakarta | 800m T34 |
| Gold medal – first place | 2022 Hangzhou | 800m T34 |
| Silver medal – second place | 2018 Jakarta | 100m T34 |

Mohamed Hammadi (born 13 July 1985) is a Paralympic wheelchair racer from United Arab Emirates who competes in category T34 short and middle-distance events.

== Career ==
He won two medals in the 100 m and 200 m sprint at the 2012 Paralympics. At the 2016 Summer Paralympics, he placed fourth over 100 m, but won the 800 m event. At the 2020 Summer Paralympics he won a silver medal in the 800 metres T34 event and a bronze medal in the 100 metres T34 event.
