= Abdullah Sultan Alaryani =

Emirati Paralympic sport shooter (born 1970)

Personal information
- Born: 12 August 1970 (age 55)

Sport
- Country: United Arab Emirates
- Sport: Paralympic shooting
- Disability: Paraplegia
- Disability class: SH1
Medal record
Paralympic Games
Gold medal – first place	2012 London	Mixed 50 m rifle prone SH1
Gold medal – first place	2020 Tokyo	50 m rifle 3 positions SH1
Silver medal – second place	2016 Rio de Janeiro	10 m air rifle standing SH1
Silver medal – second place	2016 Rio de Janeiro	50 m rifle 3 positions SH1
Silver medal – second place	2016 Rio de Janeiro	Mixed 50 m rifle prone SH1
Asian Para Games
Gold medal – first place	2022 Hangzhou	50 m rifle 3 positions

Abdullah Sultan Alaryani (born 12 August 1970) is a sport shooter from the United Arab Emirates. He competed at the Summer Paralympics in 2008, 2012, 2016 and 2021 and in total, he won two gold medals and three silver medals.

== Career ==
In 2012, he won the gold medal in the mixed 50 metre rifle prone SH1 event at the Summer Paralympics in London, United Kingdom. He also represented the United Arab Emirates at the 2016 Summer Paralympics in Rio de Janeiro, Brazil and he won three silver medals in total.

In 2021, he represented the United Arab Emirates at the 2020 Summer Paralympics in Tokyo, Japan. He won the gold medal in the R7 Men's 50 metre rifle 3 positions SH1 event.

== Personal life ==
He became paralyzed below the waist after a car crash in 2001.
