= Miquel Orobitg Guitart =

Spanish Paralympic shooter

Juan Emilio Gutierrez Berenguel
Personal information
- Nationality: Spanish

Sport
- Country: Spain
- Sport: Shooting

Miquel Orobitg Guitart is a Spanish disability shooter who has represented Spain at the 1996, 2000, 2004, 2008, and 2012 Summer Paralympics.

== Personal ==
Orobitg is from the Catalan region of Spain.

== Shooting ==
Orobitg is an SH1 classified shooter. He competed at the 2008 Summer Paralympics. He competed at the 2012 City of Oviedo Olympic Shooting Challenge, finishing second with 596 points in the R3 air rifle probe 10 meters SH1 event. He qualified for London in May 2012 with a low B qualification score, which at the time meet the minimum qualifying standards. He left for London from Madrid in late August.

Orobitg competed at the 2012 Summer Paralympics in the R1 air rifle standing 10 meters event. He competed against Natascha Hiltrop of Germany in the mixed R6-50m Rifle Prone- SH1 round. He lost in the qualifying round of the 50 meter rifle event. He was one of three Spanish shooters at the Games. He competed at the 2013 Spanish national championships, finishing second in the R3 class event with 622.2 points. Prior to attending the event, he participated in a national team training camp.
