= Serbia at the 2016 Summer Paralympics =

- IPC code: SRB
- NPC: Paralympic Committee of Serbia
- Website: www.paralympic.rs

in Rio de Janeiro
- Competitors: 16 in 4 sports
- Flag bearer: Borislava Perić Ranković
- Medals Ranked 31st: Gold 3 Silver 2 Bronze 4 Total 9

Summer Paralympics appearances (overview)
- 2008; 2012; 2016; 2020; 2024

Other related appearances
- Yugoslavia (1972–2000); Independent Paralympic Participants (1992); Serbia and Montenegro (2004)

Serbia competed at the 2016 Summer Paralympics in Rio de Janeiro, Brazil, from 7 September to 18 September 2016. The first places the team qualified were for two athletes in shooting events.

== Medalists ==
Medal	Name	Sport	Event
Gold	Željko Dimitrijević	Athletics	Club Throw F51
Gold	Laslo Šuranji	Shooting	R7-50m Rifle 3 Positions SH1
Gold	Borislava Perić-Ranković	Table tennis	Individual C4
Silver	Miloš Mitić	Athletics	Club Throw F51
Silver	Nada Matić; Borislava Perić-Ranković	Table tennis	Women's Team – Class 4–5
Bronze	Nemanja Dimitrijević	Athletics	Javelin Throw F12-13
Bronze	Laslo Šuranji	Shooting	R6-50m Rifle Prone SH1
Bronze	Nada Matić	Table tennis	Individual C4
Bronze	Mitar Palikuća	Table tennis	Individual C5

== Disability classifications ==
Every participant at the Paralympics has their disability grouped into one of five disability categories; amputation, the condition may be congenital or sustained through injury or illness; cerebral palsy; wheelchair athletes, there is often overlap between this and other categories; visual impairment, including blindness; Les autres, any physical disability that does not fall strictly under one of the other categories, for example dwarfism or multiple sclerosis. Each Paralympic sport then has its own classifications, dependent upon the specific physical demands of competition. Events are given a code, made of numbers and letters, describing the type of event and classification of the athletes competing. Some sports, such as athletics, divide athletes by both the category and severity of their disabilities, other sports, for example swimming, group competitors from different categories together, the only separation being based on the severity of the disability.

== Athletics ==
Men's Field Events

Athlete	Event	Distance	Rank
Željko Dimitrijević	Club Throw F51	29.96m WR	1st place, gold medalist(s)
Miloš Mitić	Club Throw F51	26.84 PB	2nd place, silver medalist(s)
Miloš Zarić	Shot Put F54-55	11.05	7
Nebojša Đurić	Shot Put F54-55	11.29	5
Nebojša Đurić	Discus Throw F54/55/56	36.75	7
Nemanja Dimitrijević	Javelin Throw F12/13	60.86 PB	3rd place, bronze medalist(s)

Women's Field Events

Athlete	Event	Distance	Rank
Saška Sokolov	Javelin Throw F46	33.26	6

== Powerlifting ==
Men

Athlete	Event	Total lifted	Rank
Petar Milenković	Men's 97 kg	NM	-

== Shooting ==
Athlete	Event	Qualification		Final	
Athlete	Event	Score	Rank	Score	Rank
Dragan Ristić	Mixed R4-10m Air Rifle Standing - SH2	626.77	15	Did not advance	
Dragan Ristić	Mixed R5-10m Air Rifle Prone - SH2	633.0	12	Did not advance	
Laslo Šuranji	Men's R1-10m Air Rifle Standing - SH1	620.7	2	139.0	5
Laslo Šuranji	Men's R7-50m Rifle 3 Positions - SH1	1165-57x PR	1	453.7 FPR	1st place, gold medalist(s)
Laslo Šuranji	Mixed R3-10m Air Rifle Prone - SH1	628.1	24	Did not advance	
Laslo Šuranji	Mixed R6-50m Rifle Prone	615.2	8	185.2	3rd place, bronze medalist(s)
Rastko Jokić	Men's P1-10m Air Pistol - SH1	559-17x	9	Did not advance	
Rastko Jokić	Mixed P3-25m Pistol - SH1	566-7x	8	7	6
Rastko Jokić	Mixed P4-50m Pistol - SH1	512-6x	24	Did not advance	
Živko Papaz	Men's P1-10m Air Pistol - SH1	549-10x	26	Did not advance	
Živko Papaz	Mixed P3-25m Pistol - SH1	581-19x	2	3	8
Živko Papaz	Mixed P4-50m Pistol - SH1	524-5x	11	Did not advance	
Zdravko Savanović	Mixed R5-10m Air Rifle Prone - SH2	631.3	16	Did not advance	

== Table tennis ==
Men's Singles

Athlete	Event	Group Stage			1st Round	Quarterfinals	Semifinals	Final	
Athlete	Event	Opposition Result	Opposition Result	Rank	Opposition Result	Opposition Result	Opposition Result	Opposition Result	Rank
Mitar Palikuća	Individual C5	Cheng (TPE); L 1-3	Depergola (ARG); W 3-0	2 Q	Kim (KOR); W 3–0	Tolba (EGY); W 3-1	Baus (GER); L 0-3	Bronze Medal Match; Urhaug (NOR); W 3–1	3rd place, bronze medalist(s)
Goran Perlić	Individual C2	Lamiraut (FRA); L 1-3	Ludrovsky (SVK); L 1-3	3	did not advance				

Women's Singles

Athlete	Event	Group Stage			Quarterfinals	Semifinals	Final	
Athlete	Event	Opposition Result	Opposition Result	Rank	Opposition Result	Opposition Result	Opposition Result	Rank
Nada Matić	Individual C4	Di Toro (AUS); W 3-0	Mikolaschek (GER); L 1–3	2 Q	Jaion (THA); W 3–1	Zhang (CHN); L 0-3	Bronze Medal Match; Gilroy (GBR); W 3–2	3rd place, bronze medalist(s)
Borislava Perić-Ranković	Individual C4	Oliveira (BRA); W 3-0	Jaion (THA); L 2-3	2 Q	Zhou (CHN); W 3–0	Gilroy (GBR); W 3–0	Zhang (CHN); W 3-2	1st place, gold medalist(s)

Teams

Athlete	Event	Round of 16	Quarterfinals	Semifinals	Final	
Athlete	Event	Opposition Result	Opposition Result	Opposition Result	Opposition Result	Rank
Mitar Palikuća; Goran Perlić	Men's Team – Class 4–5	Germany (GER); L 0–2	did not advance			
Nada Matić; Borislava Perić-Ranković	Women's Team - Class 4-5	Bye	Chinese Taipei (TPE); W 2–0	Sweden (SWE); W 2–1	China (CHN); L 0-2	2nd place, silver medalist(s)

== See also ==
- Serbia at the 2016 Summer Olympics
