= Serbia at the 2024 Summer Paralympics =

- IPC code: SRB
- NPC: Paralympic Committee of Serbia
- Website: www.paralympic.rs

in Paris, France August 28, 2024 – September 8, 2024
- Competitors: 22 in 8 sports
- Flag bearers: Željko Dimitrijević; Saška Sokolov
- Medals Ranked 55th: Gold 1 Silver 3 Bronze 2 Total 6

Summer Paralympics appearances (overview)
- 2008; 2012; 2016; 2020; 2024

Other related appearances
- Yugoslavia (1972–2000); Independent Paralympic Participants (1992); Serbia and Montenegro (2004)

Serbia competed at the 2024 Summer Paralympics in Paris, France, from 28 August to 8 September.

== Medalists ==
Medal	Athlete/s	Sport	Event	Date
Gold	Dragan Ristić	Shooting	R9 – 50 m rifle prone SH2	4 September
Silver	Nebojša Đurić	Athletics	Men's shot put F12	30 August
Silver	Borislava Perić; Nada Matić	Table Tennis	Women's doubles WD10	31 August
Silver	Borislava Perić	Table Tennis	Women's individual C4	7 September
Bronze	Mitar Palikuća	Table Tennis	Men's individual C5	3 September
Bronze	Željko Dimitrijević	Athletics	Men's club throw F51	4 September

== Competitors ==
The following is the list of number of competitors in the Games.

Sport	Men	Women	Total
Athletics	5	1	6
Paracanoeing	1	0	1
Paratriathlon	1	0	1
Powerlifting	1	0	1
Shooting	5	1	6
Swimming	0	1	1
Table tennis	1	2	3
Taekwondo	1	2	3
Total	15	7	22

== Disability classifications ==
Every participant at the Paralympics has their disability grouped into one of five disability categories; amputation, the condition may be congenital or sustained through injury or illness; cerebral palsy; wheelchair athletes, there is often overlap between this and other categories; visual impairment, including blindness; Les autres, any physical disability that does not fall strictly under one of the other categories, for example dwarfism or multiple sclerosis. Each Paralympic sport then has its own classifications, dependent upon the specific physical demands of competition. Events are given a code, made of numbers and letters, describing the type of event and classification of the athletes competing. Some sports, such as athletics, divide athletes by both the category and severity of their disabilities, other sports, for example swimming, group competitors from different categories together, the only separation being based on the severity of the disability.

== Athletics ==
Serbian track and field athletes achieved quota places for the following events based on their results at the 2023 World Championships, 2024 World Championships, or through high performance allocation, as long as they meet the minimum entry standard (MES).

Key

- Note–Ranks given for track events are within the athlete's heat only
- Q = Qualified for the next round
- q = Qualified for the next round as a fastest loser or, in field events, by position without achieving the qualifying target
- DQ = Disqualified
- PR = Paralympic Record
- AR = Area (or continental) Record
- NR = National Record
- SB = Season's Best
- N/A = Round not applicable for the event
- Bye = Athlete not required to compete in round

Track & road events

Athlete	Event	Heat		Final	
Athlete	Event	Result	Rank	Result	Rank
Saška Sokolov	Women's 100 m T47	12.54	3 Q	12.56	5
Saška Sokolov	Women's 200 m T47	25.98	6	Did not advance	

Field events

Athlete	Event	Final	
Athlete	Event	Distance	Position
Željko Dimitrijević	Men's club throw F51	34.18	3rd place, bronze medalist(s)
Filip Graovac	Men's club throw F51	32.21	4
Aleksandar Radišić	Men's club throw F51	31.32	7
Stefan Dimitrijević	Men's shot put F12	14.60	6
Nebojša Đurić	Men's shot put F55	11.98	2nd place, silver medalist(s)
Nebojša Đurić	Men's discus throw F56	DNS	
Saška Sokolov	Women's shot put F46	9.39	10
Saška Sokolov	Women's javelin throw F46	36.83	7

== Paracanoeing ==
Serbia earned quota places for the following events through the 2024 ICF Canoe Sprint World Championships in Szeged, Hungary.

Athlete	Event	Heats		Semifinal		Final	
Athlete	Event	Time	Rank	Time	Rank	Time	Rank
Strahinja Bukvić	Men's KL2	46.11	6 SF	45.88	5 FB	45.62	12

== Paratriathlon ==
Athlete	Event	Swim (750 m)	Trans 1	Bike (20 km)	Trans 2	Run (5 km)	Total time	Rank
Lazar Filipović (Guide – Jovan Ponjević)	Men's PTVI	14:49	0:52	29:34	0:35	17:49	1:03:39	10

== Powerlifting ==
Athlete	Event	Result	Rank
Petar Milenković	Men's 97 kg	215	5

== Shooting ==
Serbia entered six para-shooter's after achieved quota places for the following events by virtue of their best finishes at the 2022, 2023 and 2024 world cup, 2022 World Championships, 2023 World Championships, 2023 European Para Championships and 2024 European Championships, as long as they obtained a minimum qualifying score (MQS) by May 31, 2020.

Men

Athlete	Event	Qualification		Final	
Athlete	Event	Points	Rank	Points	Rank
Živko Papaz	P1 – 10 m air pistol SH1	554	18	Did not advance	
Laslo Šuranji	R1 – 10 m air rifle standing SH1	598.5	17	Did not advance	
Laslo Šuranji	R7 – 50 m rifle 3 positions SH1	1148	11	Did not advance	

Women

Athlete	Event	Qualification		Final	
Athlete	Event	Points	Rank	Points	Rank
Jelena Pantović	R2 – 10 m air rifle standing SH1	597.3	17	Did not advance	
Jelena Pantović	R8 – 50 m rifle 3 positions SH1	1146	14	Did not advance	

Mixed

Athlete	Event	Qualification		Final	
Athlete	Event	Points	Rank	Points	Rank
Živko Papaz	P3 – 25 m pistol SH1	563	14	Did not advance	
Živko Papaz	P4 – 50 m pistol SH1	530	12	Did not advance	
Laslo Šuranji	R6 – 50 m rifle prone SH1	614.6	27	Did not advance	
Dejan Jokić	R4 – 10 m air rifle standing SH2	632.1	5 Q	125.3	8
Dejan Jokić	R5 – 10 m air rifle prone SH2	635.2	13	Did not advance	
Dragan Ristić	R5 – 10 m air rifle prone SH2	638.4	1 Q	189.4	5
Dragan Ristić	R9 – 50 m rifle prone SH2	621.4	8 Q	250.2	1st place, gold medalist(s)
Zdravko Savanović	R9 – 50 m rifle prone SH2	610.9	23	Did not advance	

== Swimming ==
Athlete	Event	Heats		Final	
Athlete	Event	Time	Rank	Time	Rank
Katarina Draganov Čordaš	Women's 50 metre backstroke S2	1:32.28	8 Q	1:28.80	7
Katarina Draganov Čordaš	Women's 100 metre backstroke S2	3:29.24	8 Q	3:18.59	8

== Table tennis ==
Serbia entered three athletes for the Paralympic games. Borislava Perić qualified for the games by virtue of her gold medal results at the 2023 European Para Championships held in Sheffield, Great Britain; meanwhile Mitar Palikuća and Nada Matić qualified for the games, through the allocations of ITTF final world ranking.

Athlete	Event	Round of 16	Quarterfinals	Semifinals	Final / BM	
Athlete	Event	Opposition Result	Opposition Result	Opposition Result	Opposition Result	Rank
Mitar Palikuća	Men's individual C5	Bye	Arabian (BRA); W 3-0	Cheng (TPE); L 0-3	Did not advance	3rd place, bronze medalist(s)
Borislava Perić	Women's individual C4	Bye	Shackleton (GBR); W 3-2	Ying (CHN); W 3-2	Mikolaschek (GER); L 1-3	2nd place, silver medalist(s)
Nada Matić	Women's individual C4	Vautier (FRA); L 0-3	Did not advance			
Borislava Perić; Nada Matić	Women's doubles WD10	Bye	Saint-Pierre / Vautier (FRA); W 3-2	Kang / Lee (KOR); W 3-1	Gu / Pan (CHN); L 1-3	2nd place, silver medalist(s)

== Taekwondo ==
Serbia entered three athletes to compete at the Paralympics competition. Marija Mičev and Jelena Rašić qualified for Paris 2024, by virtue of finishing within the top six in the Paralympic rankings in their respective class. Meanwhile, Nikola Spajić qualified for Paris 2024, following the triumph of his gold medal results in men's 80 kg classes, at the 2024 European Qualification Tournament in Sofia, Bulgaria.

Athlete	Event	First round	Quarterfinals	Semifinals	Repechage	Final / BM	
Athlete	Event	Opposition Result	Opposition Result	Opposition Result	Opposition Result	Opposition Result	Rank
Nikola Spajić	Men's –80 kg	Lopes (BRA); W 20-5	Joo (KOR); L 1-8	Did not advance	Abuzarli (AZE); W 11-9	Bakht (IRI); L 6-29	5
Marija Mičev	Women's –57 kg	Moipo (KEN); W 19–4	Dosmalova (KAZ); W 5–0	Gürdal (TUR); L 1–14	Bye	Goverdhan (NEP); L 8–15	5
Jelena Rašić	Women's +65 kg	Montes de Oca (CUB); W 13-4	Vargas (MEX); L 1-4	Did not advance	Akermach (MAR); L 0-12	Did not advance	7

== See also ==
- Serbia at the 2024 Summer Olympics
- Serbia at the Paralympics
