= Serbia at the Paralympics =

- IPC code: SRB
- NPC: Paralympic Committee of Serbia
- Website: www.paralympic.rs
- Medals: Gold 8 Silver 13 Bronze 7 Total 28

Summer appearances
- 2008; 2012; 2016; 2020; 2024

Winter appearances
- 2010; 2014; 2018; 2022; 2026

Other related appearances
- Yugoslavia (1972–2000); Independent Paralympic Participants (1992); Serbia and Montenegro (2004)

Serbia made its Paralympic Games début at the 2008 Summer Paralympics in Beijing, following its split with Montenegro. It had previously competed as part of Serbia and Montenegro in 2004; and as part of Yugoslavia before that.

Serbia made its Winter Paralympics début at the 2010 Winter Paralympics in Vancouver.

Serbian athletes have won a total of 28 Paralympic medals, of which 8 gold, 13 silver and 7 bronze medals.

== Medal tables ==
=== Medals by Summer Games ===
Games	Competitors	Gold	Silver	Bronze	Total	Rank
1972 – 2004	Part of Yugoslavia and Serbia and Montenegro					
(China) 2008 Beijing	14	0	2	0	2	56
(United Kingdom) 2012 London	13	2	3	0	5	39
(Brazil) 2016 Rio de Janeiro	16	3	2	4	9	31
(Japan) 2020 Tokyo	20	2	3	1	6	45
(France) 2024 Paris	22	1	3	2	6	55
(United States) 2028 Los Angeles	future events					
(Australia) 2032 Brisbane	future events					
Total	85	8	13	7	28	62

=== Medals by Winter Games ===
Games	Competitors	Gold	Silver	Bronze	Total	Rank
1976 – 1988	Part of Yugoslavia					
(Canada) 2010 Vancouver	1	0	0	0	0	—
(Russia) 2014 Sochi	1	0	0	0	0	—
(South Korea) 2018 Pyeongchang	1	0	0	0	0	—
(China) 2022 Beijing	did not enter					
(Italy) 2026 Milan–Cortina	1	0	0	0	0	—
Total	4	0	0	0	0	—

=== Medals per sport ===
Sport	Gold	Silver	Bronze	Total
Shooting	4	2	1	7
Athletics	3	5	2	10
Table tennis	1	6	4	11
Totals (3 entries)	8	13	7	28

== Medalists ==
Medal	Name	Games	Sport	Event
Silver	Draženko Mitrović	(China) 2008 Beijing	Athletics	Men's Discus Throw - F53/54
Silver	Borislava Perić	(China) 2008 Beijing	Table Tennis	Women's Individual - Class 4
Gold	Željko Dimitrijević	(United Kingdom) 2012 London	Athletics	Club Throw F31-32/51
Gold	Tanja Dragić	(United Kingdom) 2012 London	Athletics	Javelin Throw - F12/13
Silver	Draženko Mitrović	(United Kingdom) 2012 London	Athletics	Discus Throw F54-56
Silver	Zlatko Kesler	(United Kingdom) 2012 London	Table tennis	Individual C3
Silver	Borislava Perić-Ranković	(United Kingdom) 2012 London	Table tennis	Individual C4
Gold	Željko Dimitrijević	(Brazil) 2016 Rio de Janeiro	Athletics	Men's Club Throw - F51
Gold	Laslo Šuranji	(Brazil) 2016 Rio de Janeiro	Shooting	Men's 50m rifle 3 positions SH1
Gold	Borislava Perić-Ranković	(Brazil) 2016 Rio de Janeiro	Table tennis	Individual C4
Silver	Miloš Mitić	(Brazil) 2016 Rio de Janeiro	Athletics	Men's Club Throw - F51
Silver	Nada Matić; Borislava Perić-Ranković	(Brazil) 2016 Rio de Janeiro	Table tennis	Women's Team – Class 4–5
Bronze	Nemanja Dimitrijević	(Brazil) 2016 Rio de Janeiro	Athletics	Men's Javelin Throw - F12/13
Bronze	Laslo Šuranji	(Brazil) 2016 Rio de Janeiro	Shooting	Mixed 50m rifle prone SH1
Bronze	Mitar Palikuća	(Brazil) 2016 Rio de Janeiro	Table tennis	Individual C5
Bronze	Nada Matić	(Brazil) 2016 Rio de Janeiro	Table tennis	Individual C4
Gold	Dragan Ristić	(Japan) 2020 Tokyo	Shooting	Mixed R5 10 metre air rifle prone SH2
Gold	Dragan Ristić	(Japan) 2020 Tokyo	Shooting	Mixed R9 50 metre rifle prone SH2
Silver	Željko Dimitrijević	(Japan) 2020 Tokyo	Athletics	Men's club throw F51
Silver	Zdravko Savanović	(Japan) 2020 Tokyo	Shooting	Mixed R9 50 metre rifle prone SH2
Silver	Laslo Šuranji	(Japan) 2020 Tokyo	Shooting	Men's R7 50 metre rifle 3 positions SH1
Bronze	Borislava Perić; Nada Matić	(Japan) 2020 Tokyo	Table tennis	Women's team – Class 4–5
Gold	Dragan Ristić	(France) 2024 Paris	Shooting	R9 – 50 m rifle prone SH2
Silver	Nebojša Đurić	(France) 2024 Paris	Athletics	Men's shot put F12
Silver	Borislava Perić; Nada Matić	(France) 2024 Paris	Table Tennis	Women's doubles WD10
Silver	Borislava Perić	(France) 2024 Paris	Table Tennis	Women's individual C4
Bronze	Mitar Palikuća	(France) 2024 Paris	Table Tennis	Men's individual C5
Bronze	Željko Dimitrijević	(France) 2024 Paris	Athletics	Men's club throw F51

== Multiple medal winners ==
This is a list of people who have won two or more Olympic medals, who represented Serbia as an independent country at least once.

Athlete	Sport	Gender	Years	Games	1st place, gold medalist(s)	2nd place, silver medalist(s)	3rd place, bronze medalist(s)	Total
Dragan Ristić	Shooting	M	2012–2024	Summer	3	0	0	3
Željko Dimitrijević	Athletics	M	2012–2024	Summer	2	1	1	4
Borislava Perić	Table tennis	W	2008–2024	Summer	1	5	1	7
Zlatko Kesler	Table tennis	M	1992–2012	Summer	1	2	2	5
Laslo Šuranji	Shooting	M	2012–2020	Summer	1	1	1	3
Nada Matić	Table tennis	W	2008–2024	Summer	0	2	2	4
Draženko Mitrović	Athletics	M	2008–2012	Summer	0	2	0	2

== Flagbearers ==
Summer Paralympics
Year	Athlete	Sport
2008 Beijing	Zlatko Kesler	Table tennis
2012 London	Draženko Mitrović	Athletics
2016 Rio de Janeiro	Borislava Perić-Ranković	Table tennis
2020 Tokyo	Saška Sokolov	Athletics
2020 Tokyo	Laslo Šuranji	Shooting
2024 Paris	Saška Sokolov	Athletics
2024 Paris	Željko Dimitrijević	Athletics

Winter Paralympics
Year	Athlete	Sport
2010 Vancouver	Jasmin Bambur	Alpine skiing
2014 Sochi	Jugoslav Milošević	Alpine skiing
2018 Pyeongchang	Miloš Zarić	Cross-country skiing
2026 Milano Cortina	Luka Bilčar	Alpine skiing

== Predecessor countries ==
Country	№ Summer	Gold	Silver	Bronze	Total	№ Winter	Gold	Silver	Bronze	Total	№ Games	Gold	Silver	Bronze	Combined Total
Yugoslavia (YUG) (Federal Republic of Yugoslavia) FR Yugoslavia (YUG)	6	22	23	33	78	4	0	0	1	1	10	22	23	34	79
Independent Paralympic Participants (IPP)	1	4	3	1	8	0	0	0	0	0	1	4	3	1	8
Serbia and Montenegro (SCG)	1	0	0	2	2	0	0	0	0	0	1	0	0	2	2
Total	8	26	26	36	88	4	0	0	1	1	12	26	26	37	89

== See also ==
- Serbia at the Olympics
