= Serbia at the 2020 Summer Paralympics =

- IPC code: SRB
- NPC: Paralympic Committee of Serbia
- Website: www.paralympic.rs

in Tokyo
- Competitors: 20 in 7 sports
- Flag bearers (opening): Saška Sokolov; Laslo Šuranji
- Flag bearer (closing): Laslo Šuranji
- Medals Ranked 45th: Gold 2 Silver 3 Bronze 1 Total 6

Summer Paralympics appearances (overview)
- 2008; 2012; 2016; 2020; 2024

Other related appearances
- Yugoslavia (1972–2000); Independent Paralympic Participants (1992); Serbia and Montenegro (2004)

Serbia competed at the 2020 Summer Paralympics in Tokyo, Japan, from 24 August to 5 September 2021.

== Medalists ==
Medal	Athlete/s	Sport	Event	Date
Gold	Dragan Ristić	Shooting	Mixed R5 10 metre air rifle prone SH2	1 September
Gold	Dragan Ristić	Shooting	Mixed R9 50 metre rifle prone SH2	4 September
Silver	Željko Dimitrijević	Athletics	Men's club throw F51	1 September
Silver	Laslo Šuranji	Shooting	Men's R7 50 metre rifle 3 positions SH1	3 September
Silver	Zdravko Savanović	Shooting	Mixed R9 50 metre rifle prone SH2	4 September
Bronze	Borislava Perić; Nada Matić	Table tennis	Women's team – Class 4–5	1 September

== Disability classifications ==
Every participant at the Paralympics has their disability grouped into one of five disability categories; amputation, the condition may be congenital or sustained through injury or illness; cerebral palsy; wheelchair athletes, there is often overlap between this and other categories; visual impairment, including blindness; Les autres, any physical disability that does not fall strictly under one of the other categories, for example dwarfism or multiple sclerosis. Each Paralympic sport then has its own classifications, dependent upon the specific physical demands of competition. Events are given a code, made of numbers and letters, describing the type of event and classification of the athletes competing. Some sports, such as athletics, divide athletes by both the category and severity of their disabilities, other sports, for example swimming, group competitors from different categories together, the only separation being based on the severity of the disability.

== Athletics ==
Men's Field Events

Athlete	Event	Distance	Rank
Nebojša Đurić	Shot Put F55	11.28	6
Nebojša Đurić	Discus Throw F56	39.14 PB	6
Nemanja Matijašević	Long Jump T47	7.07 PB	7
Željko Dimitrijević	Club Throw F51	35.29 PB	2nd place, silver medalist(s)

Women's Track Events

Athlete	Events	Heat		Final	
Athlete	Events	Result	Rank	Result	Rank
Saška Sokolov	100m T47	12.43	3 Q	12.48	5
Saška Sokolov	200m T47	26.01	2 Q	26.10	7

Women's Field Events

Athlete	Event	Distance	Rank
Saška Sokolov	Javelin Throw F46	36.09	5

== Cycling ==
=== Road ===
Athlete	Event	Time	Rank
Milan Petrović; Pilot: Goran Šmelcerović	Men's time trial B	49:45.02	7
Milan Petrović; Pilot: Goran Šmelcerović	Men's road race B	-1LAP	7

== Powerlifting ==
Athlete	Event	Result	Rank
Petar Milenković	Men's 97 kg	203	5

== Shooting ==
Serbia entered six athletes into the Paralympic competition. All of them successfully break the Paralympic qualification at the 2018 WSPS World Championships which was held in Cheongju, South Korea and two others from 2019 WSPS World Championships which was held in Sydney, Australia.

Athlete	Event	Qualification		Final	
Athlete	Event	Score	Rank	Score	Rank
Dejan Jokić	R4 Mixed 10 metre air rifle standing SH2	DNS		Did not advance	
Dejan Jokić	R5 Mixed 10 metre air rifle prone SH2	DNS		Did not advance	
Dejan Jokić	R9 Mixed 50 metre air rifle prone SH2	DNS		Did not advance	
Rastko Jokić	P1 Men's 10 metre air pistol SH1	548	21	Did not advance	
Rastko Jokić	P3 Mixed 25 metre pistol SH1	561	11	Did not advance	
Rastko Jokić	P4 Mixed 50 metre pistol SH1	523	14	Did not advance	
Živko Papaz	P1 Men's 10 metre air pistol SH1	557	12	Did not advance	
Živko Papaz	P3 Mixed 25 metre pistol SH1	546	22	Did not advance	
Živko Papaz	P4 Mixed 50 metre pistol SH1	534	6 Q	139.8	6
Dragan Ristić	R4 Mixed 10 metre air rifle standing SH2	626.1	16	Did not advance	
Dragan Ristić	R5 Mixed 10 metre air rifle prone SH2	638.2	3 Q	255.5 PR	1st place, gold medalist(s)
Dragan Ristić	R9 Mixed 50 metre air rifle prone SH2	631.3 QWR	1 Q	252.7 WR	1st place, gold medalist(s)
Zdravko Savanović	R5 Mixed 10 metre air rifle prone SH2	632.1	20	Did not advance	
Zdravko Savanović	R9 Mixed 50 metre air rifle prone SH2	622.7	8 Q	250.1	2nd place, silver medalist(s)
Laslo Šuranji	R1 Men's 10 metre air rifle standing SH1	612.6	12	Did not advance	
Laslo Šuranji	R3 Mixed 10 metre air rifle prone SH1	621.3	47	Did not advance	
Laslo Šuranji	R6 Mixed 50 metre rifle prone SH1	609.7	34	Did not advance	
Laslo Šuranji	R7 Men's 50 metre rifle 3 positions SH1	1164	3 Q	452.9	2nd place, silver medalist(s)

== Swimming ==
Athlete	Event	Heats		Final	
Athlete	Event	Time	Rank	Time	Rank
Katarina Draganov Čordaš	Women's 50 metre backstroke S2	1:32.98	9	Did not advance	
Katarina Draganov Čordaš	Women's 100 metre backstroke S2	3:28.25	9	Did not advance	

== Table tennis ==
Serbia entered five athletes into the table tennis competition at the games. Borislava Peric-Rankovic qualified from 2019 ITTF European Para Championships which was held in Helsingborg, Sweden and other four athletes via World Ranking allocation.

Men

Athlete	Event	Group stage			1st Round	Quarterfinals	Semifinals	Final	
Athlete	Event	Opposition Result	Opposition Result	Rank	Opposition Result	Opposition Result	Opposition Result	Opposition Result	Rank
Mitar Palikuća	Individual C5	Urhaug (NOR); W 3-2	Depergola (ARG); W 3-0	1	—N/a	Öztürk (TUR); L 1-3	Did not advance		
Goran Perlić	Individual C2	Park (KOR); L 0-3	Turcio (MEX); W 3-2	2	Nazirov (RPC); L 2-3	Did not advance			
Mitar Palikuća; Goran Perlić	Team C4-5	—N/a			Poland (POL); L 1–2	Did not advance			

Women

Athlete	Event	Group stage			1st Round	Quarterfinals	Semifinals	Final	
Athlete	Event	Opposition Result	Opposition Result	Rank	Opposition Result	Opposition Result	Opposition Result	Opposition Result	Rank
Ana Prvulović	Individual Class 1-2	Liu (CHN); L 0-3	Bootwansirina (THA); W 3-0	2	—N/a	Seo (KOR); L 0-3	Did not advance		
Borislava Perić	Individual C4	Lu (TPE); W 3-0	Bailey (GBR); W 3-0	1	—N/a	Patel (IND); L 0-3	Did not advance		
Nada Matić	Individual C4	Mikolaschek (GER); L 0-3	Di Toro (AUS); W 3-0	2	Jaion (THA); L 2-3	Did not advance			
Borislava Perić; Nada Matić	Team C4-5	—N/a				RPC (RPC); W 2–0	Sweden (SWE); L 0–2	Did not advance	3rd place, bronze medalist(s)

== Taekwondo ==
Serbia qualified two athletes to compete at the Paralympics competition. All of them qualified by finishing top six in world rankings.

Athlete	Event	First round	Quarterfinals	Semifinals	Repachage 1	Repachage 2	Final / BM	
Athlete	Event	Opposition Result	Opposition Result	Opposition Result	Opposition Result	Opposition Result	Opposition Result	Rank
Danijela Jovanovic	Women's –49 kg	Tanwar (IND); L 9-29	Did not advance		Phuangkitcha (THA); L 3-35	Did not advance		
Marija Mičev	Women's –58 kg	Dosmalova (KAZ); W 38-9	Li (CHN); L 17-23	Did not advance	Hines (JAM); W 18-5	Goverdhan (NEP); L 15-23	Did not advance	

== See also ==
- Serbia at the 2020 Summer Olympics
