= Serbia at the 2012 Summer Paralympics =

- IPC code: SRB
- NPC: Paralympic Committee of Serbia
- Website: www.paralympic.rs

in London
- Competitors: 13 in 4 sports
- Flag bearer: Draženko Mitrović
- Medals Ranked 39th: Gold 2 Silver 3 Bronze 0 Total 5

Summer Paralympics appearances (overview)
- 2008; 2012; 2016; 2020; 2024

Other related appearances
- Yugoslavia (1972–2000); Independent Paralympic Participants (1992); Serbia and Montenegro (2004)

Serbia competed at the 2012 Summer Paralympics in London, United Kingdom from August 29 to September 9, 2012.

== Medalists ==
Medal	Name	Sport	Event
Gold	Željko Dimitrijević	Athletics	Club Throw F31-32/51
Gold	Tanja Dragić	Athletics	Javelin Throw - F12/13
Silver	Zlatko Kesler	Table tennis	Individual C3
Silver	Borislava Perić-Ranković	Table tennis	Individual C4
Silver	Draženko Mitrović	Athletics	Discus Throw F54-56

== Athletics ==
Men's Field Events

Athlete	Event	Distance	Points	Rank
Željko Dimitrijević	Club Throw F31-32/51	26.88m WR	1010	1st place, gold medalist(s)
Miloš Grlica	Javelin Throw F12-13	54.07m	—N/a	6
Draženko Mitrović	Shot Put F54-56	9.15m	917	8
Draženko Mitrović	Discus Throw F54-56	32.97m WR	1012	2nd place, silver medalist(s)
Draženko Mitrović	Javelin Throw F54-56	24.34m	—N/a	5

Women's Field Events

Athlete	Event	Distance	Rank
Tanja Dragić	Javelin Throw F12-13	42.51m WR	1st place, gold medalist(s)

== Cycling ==
=== Road ===
Men

Athlete	Event	Time	Rank
Milan Petrović	Road Race B	2:33:37	11
Milan Petrović	Time Trial B	34:20.76	14

== Shooting ==
Athlete	Event	Qualification		Final	
Athlete	Event	Score	Rank	Score	Rank
Mirjana Ilić-Đuričin	Women's 10m Air Pistol SH1	358	11	Did not advance	
Živko Papaz	Men's 10m Air Pistol SH1	563	7	660.7	6
Živko Papaz	Mixed 50m Pistol SH1	510	22	Did not advance	
Živko Papaz	Mixed 25m Pistol SH1	560	7	755.5	7
Dragan Ristić	Mixed 10m Air Rifle Prone SH2	598	19	Did not advance	
Dragan Ristić	Mixed 10m Air Rifle Standing SH2	594	19	Did not advance	
Laslo Šuranji	Men's 50m Rifle 3 Positions SH1	1109	20	Did not advance	
Laslo Šuranji	Men's 10m Air Rifle Standing SH1	580	17	Did not advance	
Laslo Šuranji	Mixed 50m Rifle Prone SH1	567	45	Did not advance	
Laslo Šuranji	Mixed 10m Air Rifle Prone SH1	592	39	Did not advance	
Siniša Vidić	Mixed 10m Air Rifle Prone SH2	598	18	Did not advance	
Siniša Vidić	Mixed 10m Air Rifle Standing SH2	599	4	704.5	4

== Table tennis ==
Men's Singles

Athlete	Event	Group Stage			Quarterfinals	Semifinals	Final	
Athlete	Event	Opposition Result	Opposition Result	Rank	Opposition Result	Opposition Result	Opposition Result	Rank
Zlatko Kesler	Individual C3	Dollmann (AUT); W 3-1	Knaf (BRA); W 3-2	1 Q	Zhao (CHN); W 3–2	Schmidberger (GER); W 3-0	Feng (CHN); L 0-3	2nd place, silver medalist(s)

Women's Singles

Athlete	Event	Group Stage			Semifinals	Final	
Athlete	Event	Opposition Result	Opposition Result	Rank	Opposition Result	Opposition Result	Rank
Nada Matić	Individual C4	Oliveira (BRA); W 3-1	Zhang (CHN); L 0–3	2	did not advance		
Borislava Perić-Ranković	Individual C4	Al-Azzam (JOR); W 3-0	Jung (KOR); W 3-0	1 Q	Zhang (CHN); W 3–2	Zhou (CHN); L 0–3	2nd place, silver medalist(s)

Teams

Athlete	Event	Round of 16	Quarterfinals	Semifinals	Final	
Athlete	Event	Opposition Result	Opposition Result	Opposition Result	Opposition Result	Rank
Nada Matić; Borislava Perić-Ranković	Team C4-5	Bye	Brazil (BRA); W 3–0	China (CHN); L 0–3	Bronze Medal Match; South Korea (KOR); L 1-3	4

== See also ==
- Serbia at the 2012 Summer Olympics
