= Table tennis at the 2020 Summer Paralympics – Women's individual – Class 4 =

Table tennis at the XVI Paralympic Games
- Venue: Tokyo Metropolitan Gymnasium
- Dates: 25–29 August 2021
- Competitors: 15 from 12 nations

Medalists
1st place, gold medalist(s)		Zhou Ying	China
2nd place, silver medalist(s)		Bhavina Hasmukhbhai Patel	India
3rd place, bronze medalist(s)		Gu Xiaodan	China
3rd place, bronze medalist(s)		Zhang Miao	China

The women's individual table tennis – Class 4 tournament at the 2020 Summer Paralympics in Tokyo took place between 25 and 29 August 2021 at Tokyo Metropolitan Gymnasium. Classes 1–5 were for athletes with a physical impairment that affected their legs, and who competed in a sitting position. The lower the number, the greater the impact the impairment is on an athlete's ability to compete.

In the preliminary stage, athletes competed in seven groups of three. Winners and runners-up of each group qualified for the knock-out stage. In this edition of the Games, no bronze medal match was held. Losers of each semifinal were automatically awarded a bronze medal.

== Results ==
All times are local time in UTC+9.

=== Preliminary round ===
The first two matches were played on 25 August, and the third on 26 August.

Qualified for the knock-out stage

==== Group A ====
Seed	Athlete	Matches won	Matches lost	Games won	Games lost	Points diff	Rank
1	Zhou Ying (CHN)	2	0	6	0	+32	1
12	Bhavina Patel (IND)	1	1	3	4	–13	2
9	Megan Shackleton (GBR)	0	2	1	6	–19	3

Zhou Ying (CHN)	11	11	11
Bhavina Patel (IND)	3	9	2

Bhavina Patel (IND)	11	9	17	13
Megan Shackleton (GBR)	7	11	15	11

Zhou Ying (CHN)	11	11	11
Megan Shackleton (GBR)	8	6	6

==== Group B ====
Seed	Athlete	Matches won	Matches lost	Games won	Games lost	Points diff	Rank
2	Borislava Perić (SRB)	2	0	6	0	+30	1
10	Lu Pi-chun (TPE)	1	1	3	4	–11	2
11	Sue Bailey (GBR)	0	2	1	6	–19	3

Borislava Perić (SRB)	11	11	11
Lu Pi-chun (TPE)	3	9	6

Lu Pi-chun (TPE)	11	6	11	11
Sue Bailey (GBR)	9	11	6	9

Borislava Perić (SRB)	11	11	11
Sue Bailey (GBR)	7	5	6

==== Group C ====
Seed	Athlete	Matches won	Matches lost	Games won	Games lost	Points diff	Rank
3	Zhang Miao (CHN)	2	0	6	2	+25	1
7	Wijittra Jaion (THA)	1	1	5	3	+10	2
13	Aleksandra Vasileva (RPC)	0	2	0	6	–35	3

Zhang Miao (CHN)	12	5	10	11	14
Wijittra Jaion (THA)	10	11	12	3	12

Wijittra Jaion (THA)	11	11	11
Aleksandra Vasileva (RPC)	4	7	8

Zhang Miao (CHN)	11	11	11
Aleksandra Vasileva (RPC)	4	4	4

==== Group D ====
Seed	Athlete	Matches won	Matches lost	Games won	Games lost	Points diff	Rank
4	Gu Xiaodan (CHN)	2	0	6	0	+42	1
8	Joyce de Oliveira (BRA)	1	1	3	3	–11	2
14	Faten Elelimat (JOR)	0	2	0	6	–31	3

Gu Xiaodan (CHN)	11	11	11
Joyce de Oliveira (BRA)	5	4	3

Joyce de Oliveira (BRA)	11	11	11
Faten Elelimat (JOR)	7	9	7

Gu Xiaodan (CHN)	11	11	11
Faten Elelimat (JOR)	2	5	5

==== Group E ====
Seed	Athlete	Matches won	Matches lost	Games won	Games lost	Points diff	Rank
5	Sandra Mikolaschek (GER)	2	0	6	0	+24	1
6	Nada Matic (SRB)	1	1	3	3	+3	2
15	Daniela di Toro (AUS)	0	2	0	6	–27	3

Sandra Mikolaschek (GER)	11	11	12
Nada Matic (SRB)	7	7	10

Nada Matic (SRB)	11	11	11
Daniela di Toro (AUS)	5	8	7

Sandra Mikolaschek (GER)	11	11	13
Daniela di Toro (AUS)	6	4	11

=== Knockout stage ===
Round of 16
Wijittra Jaion (THA)	11	5	7	11	9
Nada Matic (SRB)	6	11	11	3	11
Bhavina Patel (IND)	12	13	11
Joyce de Oliveira (BRA)	10	11	6

Quarter-finals
Zhou Ying (CHN)	11	11	8	11
Nada Matic (SRB)	4	7	11	9
Lu Pi-chun (TPE)	12	7	7	2
Gu Xiaodan (CHN)	10	11	11	11
Zhang Miao (CHN)	11	11	5	11
Sandra Mikolaschek (GER)	2	8	11	9
Bhavina Patel (IND)	11	11	11
Borislava Peric (SRB)	5	6	7

Semi-finals
Zhou Ying (CHN)	11	11	11
Gu Xiaodan (CHN)	4	3	6
Zhang Miao (CHN)	11	7	4	11	8
Bhavina Patel (IND)	7	11	11	9	11

Gold medal match
Zhou Ying (CHN)	11	11	11
Bhavina Patel (IND)	7	5	6
