= Table tennis at the 2024 Summer Paralympics =

Para table tennis at the XVII Paralympic Games
- Venue: South Paris Arena
- Dates: 29 August to 7 September 2024
- Competitors: 280 from 48 nations

Table tennis at the 2024 Summer Paralympics in Paris, France took place between 29 August and 7 September at the South Paris Arena.

There were fifteen men's events (eleven singles, four doubles), fourteen women's events (ten singles, four doubles) and two mixed doubles events. There were no teams events at these Paralympic Games; this was the first time that doubles events took place since the 1976 Summer Paralympics.

== Schedule ==
The schedule was as below:

P	Preliminary round	¼	Quarter-finals	½	Semi-finals	G	Gold medal match

Events	Dates																				
Events	Thu 29 Aug			Fri 30 Aug		Sat 31 Aug		Sun 1 Sep		Mon 2 Sep		Tue 3 Sep		Wed 4 Sep		Thu 5 Sep		Fri 6 Sep		Sat 7 Sep	
Events	M		E	M	E	M	E	M	E	M	E	M	E	M	E	M	E	M	E	M	E
Men's individual C1												P	¼		½			G			
Men's individual C2									P	P		¼			½	G					
Men's individual C3									P	P		¼				½	G				
Men's individual C4											P			¼						½	G
Men's individual C5										P	¼	½	G								
Men's individual C6										P			¼			½			G		
Men's individual C7										P			¼					½	G		
Men's individual C8									P		P				¼			½		G	
Men's individual C9												P		¼						½	G
Men's individual C10									P		¼		½		G						
Men's individual C11										P					¼	½	G				
Men's doubles MD4	P	¼			½		G														
Men's doubles MD8	P		¼		½	G															
Men's doubles MD14	P				¼	½		G													
Men's doubles MD18	P				¼	½		G													
Women's individual C1–2											P		¼			½			G		
Women's individual C3									P					¼				½	G		
Women's individual C4									P					¼						½	G
Women's individual C5												P	¼	½	G						
Women's individual C6									P					¼						½	G
Women's individual C7												P		¼		½	G				
Women's individual C8									P			¼						½		G	
Women's individual C9												P						¼		½	G
Women's individual C10									P		¼	½		G							
Women's individual C11											P		¼			½	G				
Women's doubles WD5	¼			½	G																
Women's doubles WD10	P			¼		½	G														
Women's doubles WD14	¼		½		G																
Women's doubles WD20	P			¼		½	G														
Mixed doubles XD7	P			¼		½		G													
Mixed doubles XD17	P			¼		½	G														

== Medal table ==
* Host nation (France)

Rank	NPC	Gold	Silver	Bronze	Total
1	China	11	7	6	24
2	Poland	4	1	3	8
3	South Korea	2	3	9	14
4	Australia	2	0	3	5
5	Italy	2	0	2	4
6	Germany	1	3	1	5
7	Ukraine	1	1	2	4
8	Norway	1	1	1	3
9	Japan	1	0	1	2
9	Netherlands	1	0	1	2
11	Belgium	1	0	0	1
11	Croatia	1	0	0	1
11	Cuba	1	0	0	1
11	Iraq	1	0	0	1
11	Slovakia	1	0	0	1
16	Thailand	0	4	5	9
17	Chinese Taipei	0	3	1	4
18	Great Britain	0	2	3	5
19	Serbia	0	2	1	3
20	France*	0	1	5	6
21	Turkey	0	1	3	4
–	Neutral Paralympic Athletes	0	1	1	2
22	Czech Republic	0	1	0	1
23	Brazil	0	0	4	4
24	Hungary	0	0	3	3
25	Chile	0	0	1	1
25	Denmark	0	0	1	1
25	Montenegro	0	0	1	1
25	Nigeria	0	0	1	1
25	Romania	0	0	1	1
25	Spain	0	0	1	1
25	United States	0	0	1	1
Totals (31 entries)		31	31	62	124

== Medalists ==
=== Men's events ===
Event	Class	Gold	Silver	Bronze
Singles	MS1	Yunier Fernández; Cuba	Rob Davies; Great Britain	Federico Falco; Italy
Singles	MS1	Yunier Fernández; Cuba	Rob Davies; Great Britain	Endre Major; Hungary
Singles	MS2	Rafał Czuper; Poland	Jiří Suchánek; Czech Republic	Cha Soo-yong; South Korea
Singles	MS2	Rafał Czuper; Poland	Jiří Suchánek; Czech Republic	Fabien Lamirault; France
Singles	MS3	Feng Panfeng; China	Thomas Schmidberger; Germany	Yuttajak Glinbancheun; Thailand
Singles	MS3	Feng Panfeng; China	Thomas Schmidberger; Germany	Jang Yeong-jin; South Korea
Singles	MS4	Kim Young-gun; South Korea	Wanchai Chaiwut; Thailand	Kim Jung-gil; South Korea
Singles	MS4	Kim Young-gun; South Korea	Wanchai Chaiwut; Thailand	Isau Ogunkunle; Nigeria
Singles	MS5	Tommy Urhaug; Norway	Cheng Ming-chih; Chinese Taipei	Ali Öztürk; Turkey
Singles	MS5	Tommy Urhaug; Norway	Cheng Ming-chih; Chinese Taipei	Mitar Palikuća; Serbia
Singles	MS6	Matteo Parenzan; Italy	Rungroj Thainiyom; Thailand	Peter Rosenmeier; Denmark
Singles	MS6	Matteo Parenzan; Italy	Rungroj Thainiyom; Thailand	Ian Seidenfeld; United States
Singles	MS7	Yan Shuo; China	Will Bayley; Great Britain	Jean Paul Montanus; Netherlands
Singles	MS7	Yan Shuo; China	Will Bayley; Great Britain	Chalermpong Punpoo; Thailand
Singles	MS8	Viktor Didukh; Ukraine	Zhao Shuai; China	Maksym Nikolenko; Ukraine
Singles	MS8	Viktor Didukh; Ukraine	Zhao Shuai; China	Phisit Wangphonphathanasiri; Thailand
Singles	MS9	Laurens Devos; Belgium	Lucas Didier; France	Ander Cepas; Spain
Singles	MS9	Laurens Devos; Belgium	Lucas Didier; France	Ma Lin; Australia
Singles	MS10	Patryk Chojnowski; Poland	Lian Hao; China	Matéo Bohéas; France
Singles	MS10	Patryk Chojnowski; Poland	Lian Hao; China	Filip Radović; Montenegro
Singles	MS11	Kim Gi-tae; South Korea	Chen Po-yen; Chinese Taipei	Samuel Von Einem; Australia
Singles	MS11	Kim Gi-tae; South Korea	Chen Po-yen; Chinese Taipei	Péter Pálos; Hungary
Doubles	MD4	Slovakia; Peter Lovas; Ján Riapoš	South Korea; Jang Yeong-jin; Park Sung-joo	France; Fabien Lamirault; Julien Michaud
Doubles	MD4	Slovakia; Peter Lovas; Ján Riapoš	South Korea; Jang Yeong-jin; Park Sung-joo	South Korea; Cha Soo-yong; Park Jin-cheol
Doubles	MD8	China; Cao Ningning; Feng Panfeng	Germany; Valentin Baus; Thomas Schmidberger	Thailand; Wanchai Chaiwut; Yuttajak Glinbancheun
Doubles	MD8	China; Cao Ningning; Feng Panfeng	Germany; Valentin Baus; Thomas Schmidberger	Turkey; Abdullah Öztürk; Nesim Turan
Doubles	MD14	China; Liao Keli; Yan Shuo	Thailand; Phisit Wangphonphathanasiri; Rungroj Thainiyom	Great Britain; Paul Karabardak; Billy Shilton
Doubles	MD14	China; Liao Keli; Yan Shuo	Thailand; Phisit Wangphonphathanasiri; Rungroj Thainiyom	France; Esteban Herrault; Clément Berthier
Doubles	MD18	Poland; Piotr Grudzień; Patryk Chojnowski	China; Zhao Yiqing; Liu Chaodong	China; Lian Hao; Zhao Shuai
Doubles	MD18	Poland; Piotr Grudzień; Patryk Chojnowski	China; Zhao Yiqing; Liu Chaodong	Brazil; Claudio Massad; Luiz Manara

=== Women's events ===
Event	Class	Gold	Silver	Bronze
Singles	WS1–2	Giada Rossi; Italy	Liu Jing; China	Dorota Bucław; Poland
Singles	WS1–2	Giada Rossi; Italy	Liu Jing; China	Seo Su-yeon; South Korea
Singles	WS3	Anđela Mužinić Vincetić; Croatia	Yoon Ji-yu; South Korea	Carlotta Ragazzini; Italy
Singles	WS3	Anđela Mužinić Vincetić; Croatia	Yoon Ji-yu; South Korea	Xue Juan; China
Singles	WS4	Sandra Mikolaschek; Germany	Borislava Perić-Ranković; Serbia	Gu Xiaodan; China
Singles	WS4	Sandra Mikolaschek; Germany	Borislava Perić-Ranković; Serbia	Zhou Ying; China
Singles	WS5	Zhang Bian; China	Pan Jiamin; China	Moon Sung-hye; South Korea
Singles	WS5	Zhang Bian; China	Pan Jiamin; China	Jung Young-a; South Korea
Singles	WS6	Najlah Al-Dayyeni; Iraq	Maryna Lytovchenko; Ukraine	Maliak Alieva; Neutral Paralympic Athletes
Singles	WS6	Najlah Al-Dayyeni; Iraq	Maryna Lytovchenko; Ukraine	Camelia Ciripan; Romania
Singles	WS7	Kelly van Zon; Netherlands	Kübra Öçsoy Korkut; Turkey	Bly Twomey; Great Britain
Singles	WS7	Kelly van Zon; Netherlands	Kübra Öçsoy Korkut; Turkey	Wang Rui; China
Singles	WS8	Huang Wenjuan; China	Aida Dahlen; Norway	Juliane Wolf; Germany
Singles	WS8	Huang Wenjuan; China	Aida Dahlen; Norway	Florencia Pérez; Chile
Singles	WS9	Karolina Pęk; Poland	Xiong Guiyan; China	Lei Lina; Australia
Singles	WS9	Karolina Pęk; Poland	Xiong Guiyan; China	Alexa Szvitacs; Hungary
Singles	WS10	Yang Qian; Australia	Natalia Partyka; Poland	Bruna Alexandre; Brazil
Singles	WS10	Yang Qian; Australia	Natalia Partyka; Poland	Tien Shiau-wen; Chinese Taipei
Singles	WS11	Natsuki Wada; Japan	Elena Prokofeva; Neutral Paralympic Athletes	Ebru Acer; Turkey
Singles	WS11	Natsuki Wada; Japan	Elena Prokofeva; Neutral Paralympic Athletes	Kanami Furukawa; Japan
Doubles	WD5	China; Liu Jing; Xue Juan	South Korea; Seo Su-yeon; Yoon Ji-yu	Brazil; Cátia Oliveira; Joyce de Oliveira
Doubles	WD5	China; Liu Jing; Xue Juan	South Korea; Seo Su-yeon; Yoon Ji-yu	Thailand; Dararat Asayut; Chilchitparyak Bootwansirina
Doubles	WD10	China; Gu Xiaodan; Pan Jiamin	Serbia; Nada Matić; Borislava Perić-Ranković	South Korea; Kang Oe-jeong; Lee Mi-gyu
Doubles	WD10	China; Gu Xiaodan; Pan Jiamin	Serbia; Nada Matić; Borislava Perić-Ranković	South Korea; Jung Young-a; Moon Sung-hye
Doubles	WD14	China; Huang Wenjuan; Jin Yucheng	Germany; Stephanie Grebe; Juliane Wolf	Norway; Aida Dahlen; Merethe Tveiten
Doubles	WD14	China; Huang Wenjuan; Jin Yucheng	Germany; Stephanie Grebe; Juliane Wolf	Great Britain; Felicity Pickard; Bly Twomey
Doubles	WD20	Australia; Lei Lina; Yang Qian	Chinese Taipei; Lin Tzu-yu; Tien Shiau-wen	Poland; Natalia Partyka; Karolina Pęk
Doubles	WD20	Australia; Lei Lina; Yang Qian	Chinese Taipei; Lin Tzu-yu; Tien Shiau-wen	Brazil; Bruna Alexandre; Danielle Rauen

=== Mixed events ===
Event	Class	Gold	Silver	Bronze
Doubles	XD7	China; Zhou Ying; Feng Panfeng	Thailand; Yuttajak Glinbancheun; Wijittra Jaion	China; Zhai Xiang; Gu Xiaodan
Doubles	XD7	China; Zhou Ying; Feng Panfeng	Thailand; Yuttajak Glinbancheun; Wijittra Jaion	France; Flora Vautier; Florian Merrien
Doubles	XD17	China; Mao Jingdian; Zhao Shuai	China; Peng Weinan; Xiong Guiyan	Poland; Karolina Pęk; Piotr Grudzień
Doubles	XD17	China; Mao Jingdian; Zhao Shuai	China; Peng Weinan; Xiong Guiyan	Ukraine; Viktor Didukh; Iryna Shynkarova

== Participation nations ==
- Argentina (3)
- Australia (12)
- Austria (1)
- Belgium (4)
- Brazil (15)
- Canada (1)
- Chile (7)
- China (26)
- Chinese Taipei (4)
- Croatia (4)
- Cuba (1)
- Czech Republic (4)
- Denmark (1)
- Egypt (11)
- Finland (1)
- France (21) (host)
- Germany (9)
- Great Britain (11)
- Hong Kong (3)
- Hungary (4)
- India (2)
- Indonesia (1)
- Iraq (1)
- Ireland (1)
- Italy (7)
- Japan (9)
- Kazakhstan (1)
- Mexico (2)
- Montenegro (2)
- Netherlands (2)
- Neutral Paralympic Athletes (4)
- New Zealand (1)
- Nigeria (8)
- Norway (5)
- Poland (11)
- Refugee Paralympic Team (1)
- Romania (2)
- Saudi Arabia (1)
- Serbia (3)
- Slovakia (7)
- South Korea (17)
- Spain (10)
- Sweden (6)
- Thailand (12)
- Turkey (8)
- Ukraine (9)
- United States (3)
- Venezuela (1)

== See also ==
- Table tennis at the 2024 Summer Olympics
