= Table tennis at the 2016 Summer Paralympics – Women's individual – Class 4 =

Table tennis at the XV Paralympic Games
- Venue: Riocentro Pavilion 3
- Dates: 8–12 September 2016
- Competitors: 12 from 10 nations

Medalists
1st place, gold medalist(s)		Borislava Perić-Ranković (SRB)
2nd place, silver medalist(s)		Zhang Miao (CHN)
3rd place, bronze medalist(s)		Nada Matic (SRB)

The women's individual table tennis – Class 4 tournament at the 2016 Summer Paralympics in Rio de Janeiro took place during 8–12 September 2016 at Riocentro Pavilion 3. Classes 1–5 were for athletes with a physical impairment that affected their legs, and who competed in a sitting position. The lower the number, the greater the impact the impairment was on an athlete's ability to compete.

In the preliminary stage, athletes competed in four groups of three. Winners and runners-up of each group qualified for the quarterfinals.

== Results ==
All times are local time in UTC-3.

=== Finals ===
==== Main bracket ====
Quarter-finals
A1	Zhou Ying (CHN)	7	4	10
B2	Borislava Perić-Ranković (SRB)	11	11	12
C2	Sue Gilroy (GBR)	6	12	8	13	13
D1	Sandra Mikolaschek (GER)	11	10	11	11	11
C1	Zhang Miao (CHN)	11	13	11
A2	Nergiz Altintas (TUR)	5	11	7
D2	Nada Matic (SRB)	2	11	11	11
B1	Wijittra Jaion (THA)	11	8	7	7

Semi-finals
B2	Borislava Perić-Ranković (SRB)	13	11	11
C2	Sue Gilroy (GBR)	11	4	5
C1	Zhang Miao (CHN)	11	11	11
D2	Nada Matic (SRB)	4	8	3

Finals
B2	Borislava Perić-Ranković (SRB)	11	6	7	11	11
C1	Zhang Miao (CHN)	4	11	11	3	6

==== Bronze medal match ====
Bronze medal match
C2	Sue Gilroy (GBR)	14	11	8	6	6
D2	Nada Matic (SRB)	12	8	11	11	11

=== Preliminary round ===
Qualified for the quarterfinals

==== Group A ====
Athlete	Won	Lost	Points diff	Rank
Zhou Ying (CHN)	2	0	+29	1 Q
Nergiz Altintas (TUR)	1	1	-10	2 Q
Oejeong Kang (KOR)	0	2	-19	3

Zhou Ying (CHN)	11	4	11	11
Oejeong Kang (KOR)	6	11	3	7

Zhou Ying (CHN)	11	11	11
Nergiz Altintas (TUR)	5	5	4

Nergiz Altintas (TUR)	8	11	11	11	11
Oejeong Kang (KOR)	11	13	7	5	3

==== Group B ====
Athlete	Won	Lost	Points diff	Rank
Wijittra Jaion (THA)	2	0	+12	1 Q
Borislava Perić-Ranković (SRB)	1	1	+27	2 Q
Joyce Oliveira (BRA)	0	2	-39	3

Borislava Perić-Ranković (SRB)	11	11	11
Joyce Oliveira (BRA)	4	5	3

Borislava Perić-Ranković (SRB)	11	15	11	10	7
Wijittra Jaion (THA)	8	17	2	12	11

Wijittra Jaion (THA)	9	11	11	9	12
Joyce Oliveira (BRA)	11	6	2	11	10

==== Group C ====
Athlete	Won	Lost	Points diff	Rank
Zhang Miao (CHN)	2	0	+28	1 Q
Sue Gilroy (GBR)	1	1	-2	2 Q
Lu Pi-chun (TPE)	0	2	-26	3

Zhang Miao (CHN)	11	15	11
Lu Pi-chun (TPE)	7	13	0

Zhang Miao (CHN)	11	11	11
Sue Gilroy (GBR)	7	6	9

Sue Gilroy (GBR)	11	2	11	6	11
Lu Pi-chun (TPE)	3	11	2	11	5

==== Group D ====
Athlete	Won	Lost	Points diff	Rank
Sandra Mikolaschek (GER)	2	0	+32	1 Q
Nada Matic (SRB)	1	1	+14	2 Q
Daniela Di Toro (AUS)	0	1	-56	3

Nada Matic (SRB)	11	11	11
Daniela Di Toro (AUS)	2	5	5

Nada Matic (SRB)	9	11	12	6
Sandra Mikolaschek (GER)	11	13	10	11

Sandra Mikolaschek (GER)	11	11	11
Daniela Di Toro (AUS)	2	3	3
