= Table tennis at the 2024 Summer Paralympics – Women's doubles WD10 =

Women's doubles WD10 at the XVII Paralympic Games
- Venue: South Paris Arena 4, Paris
- Dates: 29 – 31 August 2024
- Competitors: 22 from 11 nations

Medalists
1st place, gold medalist(s)		Gu Xiaodan; Pan Jiamin	China
2nd place, silver medalist(s)		Nada Matić; Borislava Perić	Serbia
3rd place, bronze medalist(s)		Kang Oe-jeong; Lee Mi-gyu	South Korea
3rd place, bronze medalist(s)		Jung Young-a; Moon Sung-hye	South Korea

The women's doubles – Class 10 tournament at the 2024 Summer Paralympics in Paris will take place between 29 and 31 August 2024 at South Paris Arena 4.

== Schedule ==
The schedule are as below:

P	Preliminary round	¼	Quarter-finals	½	Semi-finals	G	Gold medal match

Events	Dates					
Events	Thu 29 Aug		Fri 30 Aug		Sat 31 Aug	
Events	M	E	M	E	M	E
Women's doubles WD10	P		¼		½	G

== Results ==
=== Gold medal match ===
Gold medal match
3	Nada Matić (SRB); Borislava Perić (SRB)	7	11	3	7
4	Gu Xiaodan (CHN); Pan Jiamin (CHN)	11	7	11	11

=== Top half ===
Round of 16
10	S Mikolaschek (GER); J Spegel (GER)	11	11	12	11	5
6	Kang O-j (KOR); Lee M-g (KOR)	9	13	14	6	11
7	A Saint-Pierre (FRA); F Vautier (FRA)	11	11	11
11	D Di Toro (AUS); H Sands (AUS)	1	4	1

Quarter-finals
1	Zhang B (CHN); Zhou Y (CHN)	10	3	11	11	7
6	Kang O-j (KOR); Lee M-g (KOR)	12	11	7	3	11
7	A Saint-Pierre (FRA); F Vautier (FRA)	11	7	3	11	11
3	N Matić (SRB); B Perić (SRB)	5	11	11	8	13

Semi-finals
6	Kang O-j (KOR); Lee M-g (KOR)	8	11	3	9
3	N Matić (SRB); B Perić (SRB)	11	4	11	11

=== Bottom half ===
Round of 16
9	W Jaion (THA); P Sringam (THA)	11	12	6	9	9
5	H Dretar (CRO); A Mužinić (CRO)	8	10	11	11	11

Quarter-finals
4	Gu XD (CHN); Pan JM (CHN)	11	11	9	11
5	H Dretar (CRO); A Mužinić (CRO)	2	8	11	5
8	B Patel (IND); S Patel (IND)	5	6	11	6
2	Jung Y-a (KOR); Moon S-h (KOR)	11	11	9	11

Semi-finals
4	Gu XD (CHN); Pan JM (CHN)	11	11	11
2	Jung Y-a (KOR); Moon S-h (KOR)	7	6	8
