= Table tennis at the 2012 Summer Paralympics – Women's individual – Class 4 =

Table tennis Women's C4 at the XIV Paralympic Games
- Venue: ExCeL Exhibition Centre
- Dates: 30 August – 2 September 2012
- Competitors: 12 from 9 nations

Medalists
1st place, gold medalist(s)		Zhou Ying	China
2nd place, silver medalist(s)		Borislava Perić-Ranković	Serbia
3rd place, bronze medalist(s)		Moon Sung Hye	South Korea

The Women's individual table tennis – Class 4 tournament at the 2012 Summer Paralympics in London took place from 30 August to 2 September 2012 at ExCeL Exhibition Centre. Classes 1-5 are for athletes with a physical impairment that affects their legs, and who compete in a sitting position. The lower the number, the greater the impact the impairment has on an athlete’s ability to compete.

In the preliminary stage, athletes competed in four groups of three. Winners of each group qualified for the semi-finals.

== Results ==
All times are local (BST/UTC+1)

=== Finals ===
Semifinals: 1 Sep 16:45
A1	Zhou Ying (CHN)	11	11	11
C1	Moon Sung Hye (KOR)	7	9	7
D1	Zhang Miao (CHN)	11	11	11	7	7
B1	Borislava Perić-Ranković (SRB)	6	13	3	11	11

Gold medal match: 2 Sep 18:00
A1	Zhou Ying (CHN)	11	11	11
B1	Borislava Perić-Ranković (SRB)	6	8	4
Bronze medal match
C1	Moon Sung Hye (KOR)	10	11	10	11	11
D1	Zhang Miao (CHN)	12	6	12	9	5

=== Preliminary round ===
Qualified for the semifinals

==== Group A ====
Athlete	Won	Lost	Points diff
Zhou Ying (CHN)	2	0	+27
Valeria Zorzetto (ITA)	1	1	-8
Andreja Dolinar (SLO)	0	2	-19

30 August, 12:20

Zhou Ying (CHN)	11	12	11
Valeria Zorzetto (ITA)	7	10	4

30 August, 20:40

Valeria Zorzetto (ITA)	13	11	3	11
Andreja Dolinar (SLO)	11	3	11	8

31 August, 13:40

Zhou Ying (CHN)	11	11	11
Andreja Dolinar (SLO)	7	5	7

==== Group B ====
Athlete	Won	Lost	Points diff
Borislava Perić-Ranković (SRB)	2	0	+38
Fatemah Al-Azzam (JOR)	1	1	-12
Jung Ji Nam (KOR)	0	2	-26

30 August, 12:20

Borislava Perić-Ranković (SRB)	11	11	11
Fatemah Al-Azzam (JOR)	3	3	4

30 August, 20:40

Fatemah Al-Azzam (JOR)	11	11	11
Jung Ji Nam (KOR)	7	9	6

31 August, 13:40

Borislava Perić-Ranković (SRB)	11	11	11
Jung Ji Nam (KOR)	6	6	6

==== Group C ====
Athlete	Won	Lost	Points diff
Zhang Miao (CHN)	2	0	+31
Nada Matić (SRB)	1	1	-3
Joyce Oliveira (BRA)	0	2	-28

30 August, 12:20

Zhang Miao (CHN)	11	11	11
Joyce Oliveira (BRA)	1	4	7

30 August, 20:40

Joyce Oliveira (BRA)	9	11	5	8
Nada Matić (SRB)	11	7	11	11

31 August, 13:40

Zhang Miao (CHN)	11	11	11
Nada Matić (SRB)	8	9	6

==== Group D ====
Athlete	Won	Lost	Points diff
Moon Sung Hye (KOR)	2	0	+28
Sue Gilroy (GBR)	1	1	+7
Fadia Ahmed (EGY)	0	2	-35

30 August, 12:20

Moon Sung Hye (KOR)	11	11	11
Fadia Ahmed (EGY)	3	6	3

30 August, 20:40

Fadia Ahmed (EGY)	5	7	7
Sue Gilroy (GBR)	11	11	11

31 August, 13:40

Moon Sung Hye (KOR)	11	8	14	11
Sue Gilroy (GBR)	9	11	12	5
