= Moon Sung-hye =

South Korean para table tennis player

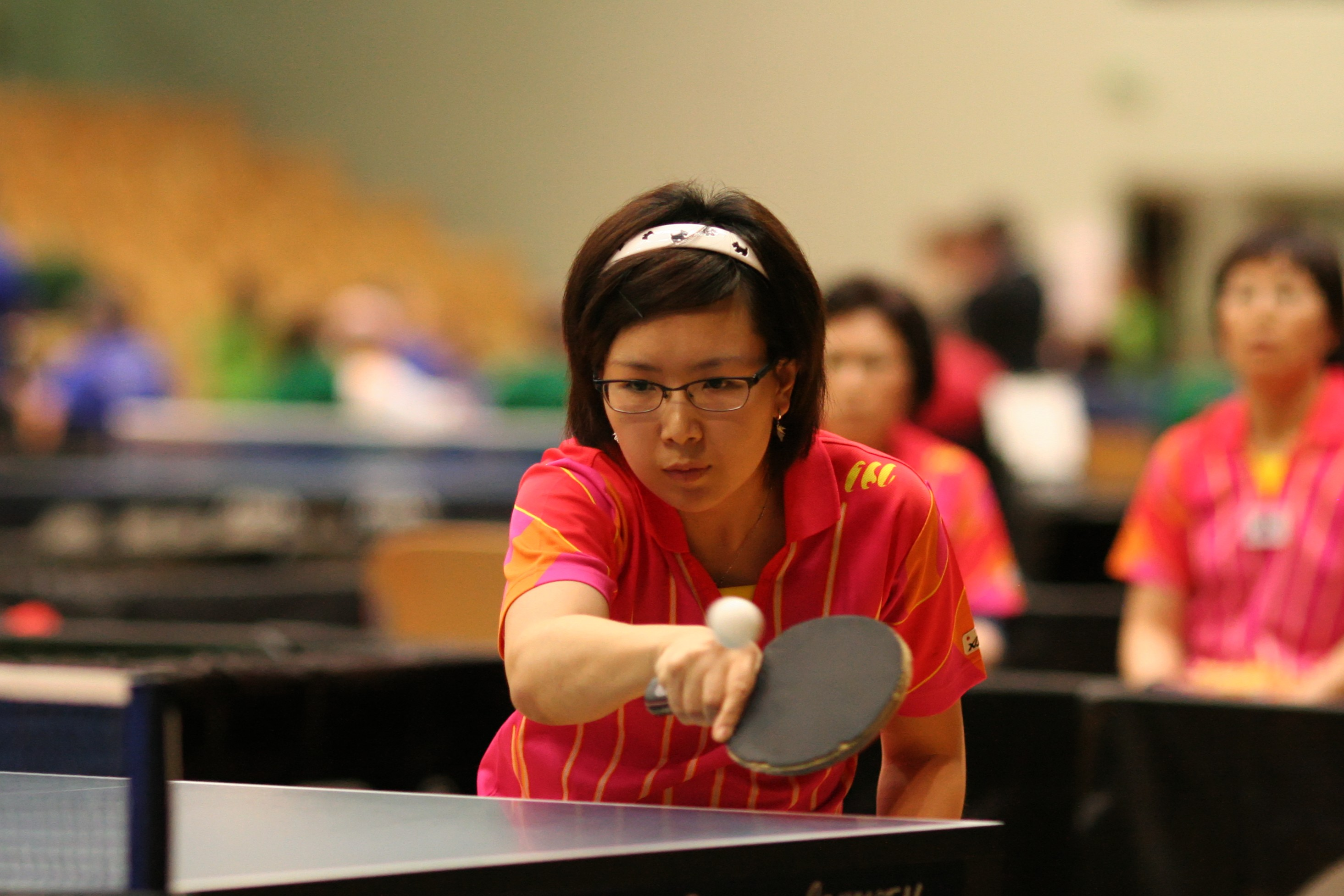
- Moon in 2008

Personal information
- Born: November 30, 1978 (age 47) Daegu, South Korea

Sport
- Sport: Table tennis
- Playing style: Right-handed shakehand grip
- Disability class: 4
- Highest ranking: 2 (January 2012)
Medal record
Women's para table tennis
Representing South Korea
Paralympic Games
Bronze medal – third place	2008 Beijing	Singles C4
Bronze medal – third place	2012 London	Singles C4
Bronze medal – third place	2012 London	Teams C4–5
Bronze medal – third place	2024 Paris	Singles C5
Bronze medal – third place	2024 Paris	Doubles WD10
World Championships
Gold medal – first place	2010 Gwangju	Teams C4
Silver medal – second place	2006 Montreux	Teams C4
Silver medal – second place	2010 Gwangju	Singles C4
Asian Para Games
Silver medal – second place	2010 Guangzhou	Singles C4
Silver medal – second place	2010 Guangzhou	Teams C4–5
Bronze medal – third place	2022 Hangzhou	Singles C5
FESPIC Games
Silver medal – second place	2006 Kuala Lumpur	Singles C4
Asian & Oceanic Championships
Silver medal – second place	2011 Hong Kong	Teams C4–5
Bronze medal – third place	2005 Kuala Lumpur	Singles C4
Bronze medal – third place	2007 Seoul	Singles C4
Bronze medal – third place	2009 Amman	Singles C4
Bronze medal – third place	2009 Amman	Teams C4–5
Bronze medal – third place	2011 Hong Kong	Singles C4

Korean name
- Hangul: 문성혜
- Hanja: 文盛慧
- RR: Mun Seonghye
- MR: Mun Sŏnghye

Moon Sung-hye (Korean: 문성혜; born November 30, 1978) is a retired South Korean para table tennis player. She won a bronze medal at the 2008 Summer Paralympics and two bronze medals at the 2012 Summer Paralympics.

== Personal life ==
Moon had a spinal cord injury from an accident in 1997.

Moon is married to Chinese para table tennis player Cao Ningning. They met for the first time in 2007, and fell in love in 2011. The couple wed in 2013 and have 3 daughters together.
