= Table tennis at the 2016 Summer Paralympics – Women's team – Class 4–5 =

Table tennis at the XV Paralympic Games
- Venue: Riocentro Pavilion 3
- Dates: 14–17 September 2016
- Competitors: 11 teams from 11 nations

Medalists
1st place, gold medalist(s)		Gu Gai; Zhang Bian; Zhou Ying	China
2nd place, silver medalist(s)		Borislava Perić; Nada Matić	Serbia
3rd place, bronze medalist(s)		Jung Young-a; Kim Ok; Kang Oe-jeong	South Korea

The Women's team table tennis – 4–5 tournament at the 2016 Summer Paralympics in Rio de Janeiro took place during 14–17 September 2016 at Riocentro Pavilion 3. Classes 1–5 were for athletes with a physical impairment that affected their legs, and who competed in a sitting position. The lower the number, the greater the impact the impairment was on an athlete's ability to compete.

== Results ==
All times are local time in UTC-3.

=== Finals ===
Round of 16
9	Turkey (TUR)	3	3
8	Israel (ISR)	0	1
7	Jordan (JOR)	2	3	0
10	Mexico (MEX)	3	1	3

Quarter-finals
1	China (CHN)	3	3
9	Turkey (TUR)	1	0
5	Brazil (BRA)	0	0
4	South Korea (KOR)	3	3
3	Serbia (SRB)	3	3
6	Chinese Taipei (TPE)	0	1
10	Mexico (MEX)	0	3	0
2	Sweden (SWE)	3	1	3

Semi-finals
1	China (CHN)	3	3
4	South Korea (KOR)	1	0
3	Serbia (SRB)	3	0	3
2	Sweden (SWE)	1	3	0

Finals
1	China (CHN)	3	3
3	Serbia (SRB)	0	0

==== Bronze medal match ====
Bronze medal match
4	South Korea (KOR)	3	1	3
2	Sweden (SWE)	0	3	1
