= Bhavina Patel =

Indian Paralympic table tennis player

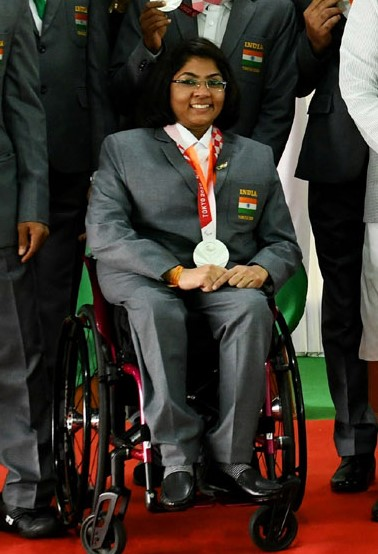

Personal information
- Full name: Bhavinaben Hasmukhbhai Patel
- Born: 6 November 1986 (age 39) Sundhiya village, Vadnagar, Mehsana district, Gujarat, India
- Height: 176 cm (5 ft 9 in)

Sport
- Country: India
- Sport: Table Tennis
- Rank: 1 (October 2025)
- Event: Para Table Tennis C4
- Coached by: Lalan Doshi
Medal record
Women's para table tennis
Representing India
Paralympic Games
Silver medal – second place	2020 Tokyo	Singles C4
Commonwealth Games
Gold medal – first place	2022 Birmingham	Singles C3–5
Asian Para Games
Silver medal – second place	2018 Jakarta	Doubles WD3-5
Bronze medal – third place	2022 Hangzhou	Singles C4

Bhavina Hasmukhbhai Patel (born 6 November 1986), also known as Bhavinaben Hasmukhbhai Patel, is an Indian parathlete and table tennis player from Mehsana, Gujarat. She won a silver medal in Class 4 Table tennis at the 2020 Summer Paralympics in Tokyo.

== Career ==
Patel has won a number of medals in national and international competitions. She reached the World Number 2 ranking by winning the silver medal for India in the individual category at the 2011 PTT Thailand Open. In October 2013, Patel won the silver medal in the women's singles Class 4 at the Asian Para Table Tennis Championships in Beijing. In 2017, Patel won the bronze medal in Bhavina won the bronze medal in the Asian Para Table Tennis Championships held in Beijing, China.

In the Tokyo 2020 Paralympics, she reached the semi-finals after defeating Borislava Rankovic and won the silver medal after being defeated by Zhou Ying. She is coached by Lalan Doshi and is guided by team official, Tejalben Lakhia. Patel also works with the Employees' State Insurance Corporation (ESIC) in Ahmedabad, India.

In the 2022 Birmingham Commonwealth Games, she won a gold medal in the women's singles class 3–5.

== Awards ==
- Arjuna Award (2021)
