= Table tennis at the 2016 Summer Paralympics – Men's individual – Class 5 =

Table tennis at the XV Paralympic Games
- Venue: Riocentro Pavilion 3
- Dates: 8–12 September 2016
- Competitors: 15 from 12 nations

Medalists
1st place, gold medalist(s)		Cao Ningning	China
2nd place, silver medalist(s)		Valentin Baus	Germany
3rd place, bronze medalist(s)		Mitar Palikuća	Serbia

The Men's individual table tennis – Class 5 tournament at the 2016 Summer Paralympics in Rio de Janeiro took place during 8–12 September 2016 at Riocentro Pavilion 3. Classes 1–5 were for athletes with a physical impairment that affected their legs and who competed in a sitting position. The lower the number, the greater the impact the impairment was on an athlete's ability to compete.

In the preliminary stage, athletes competed in five groups of three. Winners and runners-up of each group qualified for the next stage.

== Results ==
All times are local time in UTC-3.

=== Main bracket ===
==== Final rounds ====
Semi-finals
A1	Cao Ningning (CHN)	11	11	11
E1	Tommy Urhaug (NOR)	9	9	9
D1	Valentin Baus (GER)	11	12	11
C2	Mitar Palikuća (SRB)	8	10	5

Final
A1	Cao Ningning (CHN)	13	12	11
D1	Valentin Baus (GER)	11	10	8
Bronze medal match
E1	Tommy Urhaug (NOR)	11	12	6	9
C2	Mitar Palikuća (SRB)	4	14	11	11

==== Top half ====
Round of 16							Quarter-finals						Semi-finals
							A1	Cao Ningning (CHN)	13	11	11
D2	Claudiomiro Segatto (BRA)	5	11	4	11	6	B2	Lin Yen-hung (TPE)	11	2	2
B2	Lin Yen-hung (TPE)	11	3	11	7	11							A1	Cao Ningning (CHN)	11	11	11
													E1	Tommy Urhaug (NOR)	9	9	9
							E1	Tommy Urhaug (NOR)	9	11	11	11
							C1	Cheng Ming-chih (TPE)	11	5	9	9

==== Bottom half ====
Round of 16					Quarter-finals						Semi-finals
					D1	Valentin Baus (GER)	11	11	11
					E2	Ehab Fetir (EGY)	8	7	5
											D1	Valentin Baus (GER)	11	12	11
C2	Mitar Palikuća (SRB)	11	11	11							C2	Mitar Palikuća (SRB)	8	10	5
A2	Kim Ki-young (KOR)	4	3	2	C2	Mitar Palikuća (SRB)	11	11	8	11
					B1	Hassaan Tolba (EGY)	4	6	11	5

=== Preliminary round ===
Qualified for the knock-out stage

==== Group A ====
Seed	Athlete	Won	Lost	Points diff	Rank
1	Cao Ningning (CHN)	2	0	+25	1 Q
10	Kim Ki-young (KOR)	1	1	+4	2 Q
11	Bilal El Baqquali Talibi (ESP)	0	1	–29	3

Cao Ningning (CHN)	9	11	11	11
Bilal El Baqquali Talibi (ESP)	11	5	8	1

Cao Ningning (CHN)	8	11	11	11
Kim Ki-young (KOR)	11	8	9	5

Kim Ki-young (KOR)	11	11	11
Bilal El Baqquali Talibi (ESP)	8	4	9

==== Group B ====
Seed	Athlete	Won	Lost	Points diff	Rank
12	Hassaan Tolba (EGY)	2	0	+20	1 Q
9	Lin Yen-hung (TPE)	1	1	–8	2 Q
2	Ali Öztürk (TUR)	0	2	–12	3

Ali Öztürk (TUR)	5	9	2
Hassaan Tolba (EGY)	11	11	11

Ali Öztürk (TUR)	8	11	11	11	8
Lin Yen-hung (TPE)	11	13	4	5	11

Lin Yen-hung (TPE)	8	11	8	8
Hassaan Tolba (EGY)	11	5	11	11

==== Group C ====
Seed	Athlete	Won	Lost	Points diff	Rank
3	Cheng Ming-chih (TPE)	2	0	+29	1 Q
6	Mitar Palikuća (SRB)	1	1	+13	2 Q
15	Mauro Depergola (ARG)	0	2	–42	3

Cheng Ming-chih (TPE)	11	11	11
Mauro Depergola (ARG)	2	5	2

Cheng Ming-chih (TPE)	11	9	11	11
Mitar Palikuća (SRB)	9	11	8	9

Mitar Palikuća (SRB)	11	11	11
Mauro Depergola (ARG)	7	2	6

==== Group D ====
Seed	Athlete	Won	Lost	Points diff	Rank
4	Valentin Baus (GER)	2	0	+27	1 Q
13	Claudiomiro Segatto (BRA)	1	1	–13	2 Q
7	Jack Hunter Spivey (GBR)	0	2	–14	3

Valentin Baus (GER)	11	11	11
Claudiomiro Segatto (BRA)	9	6	3

Valentin Baus (GER)	11	11	12
Jack Hunter Spivey (GBR)	4	8	10

Jack Hunter Spivey (GBR)	11	11	10	4	8
Claudiomiro Segatto (BRA)	7	5	12	11	11

==== Group E ====
Seed	Athlete	Won	Lost	Points diff	Rank
5	Tommy Urhaug (NOR)	2	0	+31	1 Q
14	Ehab Fetir (EGY)	1	1	–14	2 Q
8	Nicolas Savant-Aira (FRA)	0	2	–17	3

Tommy Urhaug (NOR)	11	11	11
Ehab Fetir (EGY)	9	4	4

Tommy Urhaug (NOR)	11	11	11
Nicolas Savant-Aira (FRA)	8	8	2

Nicolas Savant-Aira (FRA)	11	6	8	9
Ehab Fetir (EGY)	3	11	11	11
