= Valentin Baus =

German para table tennis player

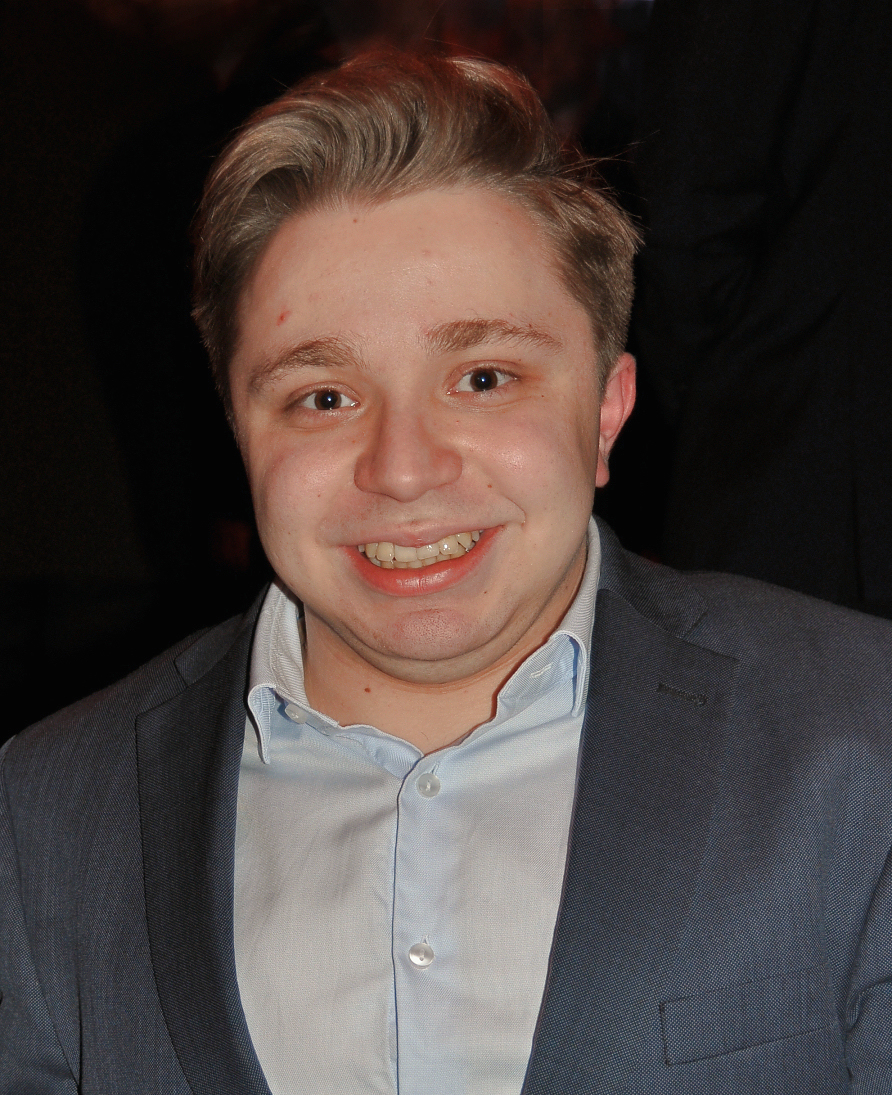
- Baus in 2017

Personal information
- Born: 14 December 1995 (age 30) Bochum, Germany
- Home town: Bochum, Germany
- Height: 158 cm (5 ft 2 in)

Sport
- Country: Germany
- Sport: Para table tennis
- Disability: Osteogenesis imperfecta
- Disability class: C5
- Club: Borussia Düsseldorf
- Coached by: Volker Ziegler
Medal record
Para table tennis
Representing Germany
Paralympic Games
Gold medal – first place	2020 Tokyo	Men's singles C5
Silver medal – second place	2016 Rio de Janeiro	Men's singles C5
Silver medal – second place	2024 Paris	Men's doubles MD8
World Championships
Gold medal – first place	2014 Beijing	Men's singles C5
World Team Championships
Bronze medal – third place	2017 Bratislava	Men's teams C5
European Championships
Gold medal – first place	2015 Vejle	Men's teams C5
Gold medal – first place	2019 Helsingborg	Men's singles C5
Silver medal – second place	2015 Vejle	Men's singles C5
Silver medal – second place	2017 Lasko	Men's teams C5
Bronze medal – third place	2013 Lignano	Men's singles C5
Bronze medal – third place	2013 Lignano	Men's teams C5
Bronze medal – third place	2019 Helsingborg	Men's teams C5

Valentin Baus (born 14 December 1995) is a German para table tennis player who competes in international level events. He is a double European champion and has won most team titles with Selcuk Cetin and Jan Gürtler.
