= Lee Mi-gyu =

South Korean para table tennis player

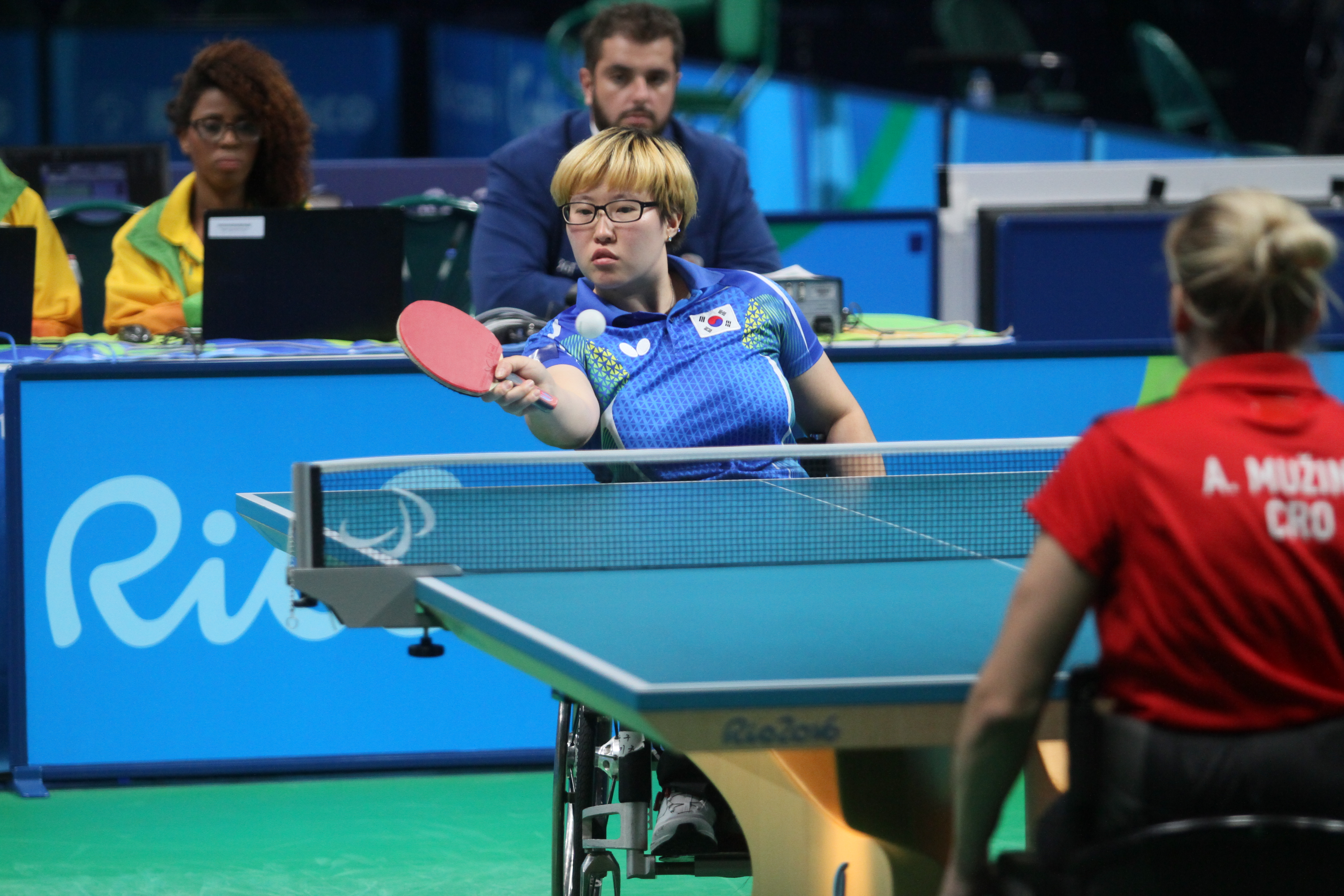
- Lee at the 2016 Summer Paralympics

Personal information
- Born: 4 November 1988 (age 37) Seoul, South Korea
- Height: 150 cm (4 ft 11 in)

Sport
- Sport: Table tennis
- Playing style: Right-handed shakehand grip
- Disability class: 3
- Highest ranking: 5 (August 2019)
- Current ranking: 6 (February 2020)
Medal record
Women's para table tennis
Representing South Korea
Paralympic Games
Bronze medal – third place	2016 Rio de Janeiro	Teams C1–3
Bronze medal – third place	2024 Paris	Doubles WD10
World Championships
Bronze medal – third place	2014 Beijing	Teams C1–3
Asian Para Games
Gold medal – first place	2014 Incheon	Singles C3
Silver medal – second place	2014 Incheon	Teams C1–3
Bronze medal – third place	2018 Jakarta	Singles C1–3
Bronze medal – third place	2018 Jakarta	Teams C2–5
Bronze medal – third place	2022 Hangzhou	Singles C3
Asian Championships
Gold medal – first place	2019 Taichung	Singles C3
Silver medal – second place	2015 Amman	Teams C1–3
Silver medal – second place	2017 Beijing	Teams C1–3
Bronze medal – third place	2013 Beijing	Singles C3
Bronze medal – third place	2013 Beijing	Teams C1–3
Bronze medal – third place	2015 Amman	Singles C3
Bronze medal – third place	2017 Beijing	Singles C1–3

Lee Mi-gyu (Korean: 이미규; RR: I Migyu, born 4 November 1988) is a South Korean para table tennis player. She won a bronze medal at the 2016 Summer Paralympics.

== Personal life ==
She became disabled when she was three years old, following a car accident.
