= Kang Oe-jeong =

South Korean para table tennis player

Personal information
- Born: 2 September 1966 (age 59) Haman County, South Gyeongsang, South Korea
- Height: 165 cm (5 ft 5 in)
- Weight: 49 kg (108 lb)

Sport
- Sport: Table tennis
- Playing style: Right-handed shakehand grip
- Disability class: 5 (formerly 4)
- Highest ranking: 3 (September 2018)
- Current ranking: 6 (February 2020)
Medal record
Women's para table tennis
Representing South Korea
Paralympic Games
Bronze medal – third place	2016 Rio de Janeiro	Teams C4–5
Bronze medal – third place	2024 Paris	Doubles WD10
World Championships
Gold medal – first place	2018 Lasko	Singles C5
Asian Para Games
Silver medal – second place	2014 Incheon	Teams C4–5
Silver medal – second place	2018 Jakarta	Mixed doubles C4–5
Bronze medal – third place	2022 Hangzhou	Singles C5
Asian Championships
Gold medal – first place	2017 Beijing	Teams C4–5
Silver medal – second place	2015 Amman	Teams C4–5
Silver medal – second place	2019 Taichung	Teams C5
Bronze medal – third place	2019 Taichung	Singles C5

Kang Oe-jeong (Korean: 강외정; RR: Gang Oejeong, born 2 September 1966) is a South Korean para table tennis player. She won a team bronze medal at the 2016 Summer Paralympics in women's Class 4–5 at age 50.

== Career ==
She also competed in wheelchair curling, and represented South Korea at the 2011 World Wheelchair Curling Championship.

== Personal life ==
Her disability is congenital.
