= Lu Pi-chun =

Taiwanese para table tennis player

Sport
- Sport: Para table tennis
- Disability: Polio
- Disability class: C4
Medal record
Representing Chinese Taipei
World Championships
Silver medal – second place	2014 Beijing	Teams C4
Asian Para Games
Silver medal – second place	2018 Jakarta	Singles C4
Bronze medal – third place	2010 Guangzhou	Teams C4-5
Bronze medal – third place	2014 Incheon	Singles C4
Bronze medal – third place	2014 Incheon	Teams C4-5
Asian Championships
Bronze medal – third place	2013 Beijing	Singles C4
Bronze medal – third place	2013 Beijing	Teams C4-5
Bronze medal – third place	2017 Beijing	Teams C4-5

Lu Pi-chun (Chinese: 盧碧春, romanized: Lú Bìchūn; born 1962 or 1963) is a Taiwanese para table tennis player who competes in international table tennis competitions. She is a World silver medalist, four-time Asian Para Games medalist and three-time Asian Championships medalist. She did not take up the sport until she was 42. She competed at the 2016 and 2020 Summer Paralympics but did not medal.
