= Flora Vautier =

French para table tennis player

Personal information
- Born: 3 November 2004 (age 21) Villepinte, Seine-Saint-Denis, France

Sport
- Sport: Table tennis
- Disability class: 4
Medal record
Para table tennis
Representing France
Paralympic Games
Bronze medal – third place	2024 Paris	Mixed doubles XD7

Flora Vautier (born 3 November 2004) is a French para table tennis player. She competed at the 2024 Summer Paralympics and won a bronze medal in the mixed doubles XD7 event with Florian Merrien.

== Sports career ==
She started playing para table tennis at the age of 13, when she met a quadriplegic coach at her first club.

A STAPS student in Nîmes, she is a member of the ASPC Nîmes club and trained by Guillaume Jean.
