= Zhang Miao (table tennis) =

Chinese para table tennis player

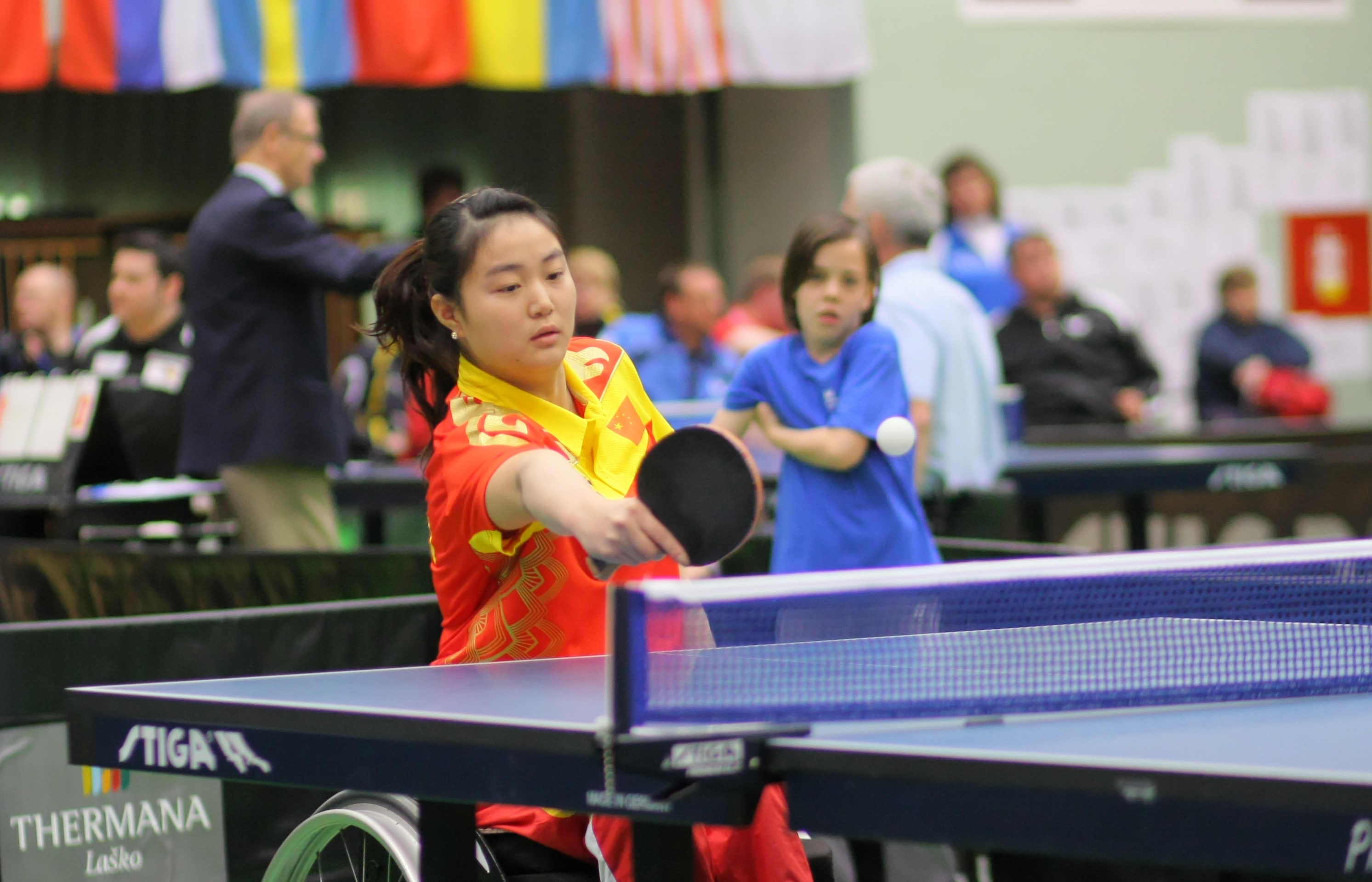
- Zhang in 2011

Personal information
- Born: 8 July 1991 (age 35) Xiao County, Anhui, China
- Height: 165 cm (5 ft 5 in)
- Weight: 45 kg (99 lb)

Sport
- Sport: Table tennis
- Playing style: Right-handed shakehand hold
- Disability class: 4
- Highest ranking: 1 (June 2015)
- Current ranking: 3 (February 2020)
Medal record
Representing China
Women's para table tennis
Paralympic Games
Gold medal – first place	2012 London	Teams C4–5
Gold medal – first place	2020 Tokyo	Teams C4-5
Silver medal – second place	2016 Rio de Janeiro	Singles C4
Bronze medal – third place	2020 Tokyo	Singles C4
World Championships
Gold medal – first place	2014 Beijing	Singles C4
Gold medal – first place	2014 Beijing	Teams C5
Bronze medal – third place	2018 Laško	Singles C4
Asian Para Games
Gold medal – first place	2010 Guangzhou	Teams C4–5
Gold medal – first place	2014 Incheon	Teams C4–5
Silver medal – second place	2014 Incheon	Singles C4
Bronze medal – third place	2010 Guangzhou	Singles C4
Bronze medal – third place	2018 Jakarta	Singles C4
Bronze medal – third place	2018 Jakarta	Doubles C3–5
Asian Championships
Gold medal – first place	2011 Hong Kong	Singles C4
Gold medal – first place	2011 Hong Kong	Teams C4–5
Gold medal – first place	2013 Beijing	Singles C4
Gold medal – first place	2013 Beijing	Teams C4–5
Gold medal – first place	2017 Beijing	Singles C4
Gold medal – first place	2019 Taichung	Teams C4
Silver medal – second place	2015 Amman	Singles C4
Silver medal – second place	2017 Beijing	Teams C4–5
Silver medal – second place	2019 Taichung	Singles C4

Zhang Miao
- Traditional Chinese: 張淼
- Simplified Chinese: 张淼
Transcriptions
Standard Mandarin
- Hanyu Pinyin: Zhāng Miǎo

Zhang Miao (Chinese: 张淼, born July 8, 1991) is a Chinese para table tennis player. She has won six Asian table tennis titles in both singles and team events along with Gu Gai, Zhang Bian and Zhou Ying.

Miao has polio and is from Xiao County, just like para table tennis star Ren Guixiang. She has been coached by Heng Xin.
