= Zdravko Savanović =

Serbian paralympic sport shooter

Sport
- Country: Serbia
- Sport: Paralympic shooting
Medal record
Mixed shooting para sport
Representing Serbia
Paralympic Games
Silver medal – second place	2020 Tokyo	Mixed 50 m rifle prone

Zdravko Savanović is a Serbian paralympic sport shooter. He participated at the 2020 Summer Paralympics in the shooting competition, being awarded the silver medal in the mixed 50 m rifle prone event. Savanović also participated at the 2016 Summer Paralympics in the shooting competition, winning no medal. He also competed at the 2024 Paralympic Games in Paris.
