= Sue Bailey (table tennis) =

British para table tennis player

Sue Bailey MBE
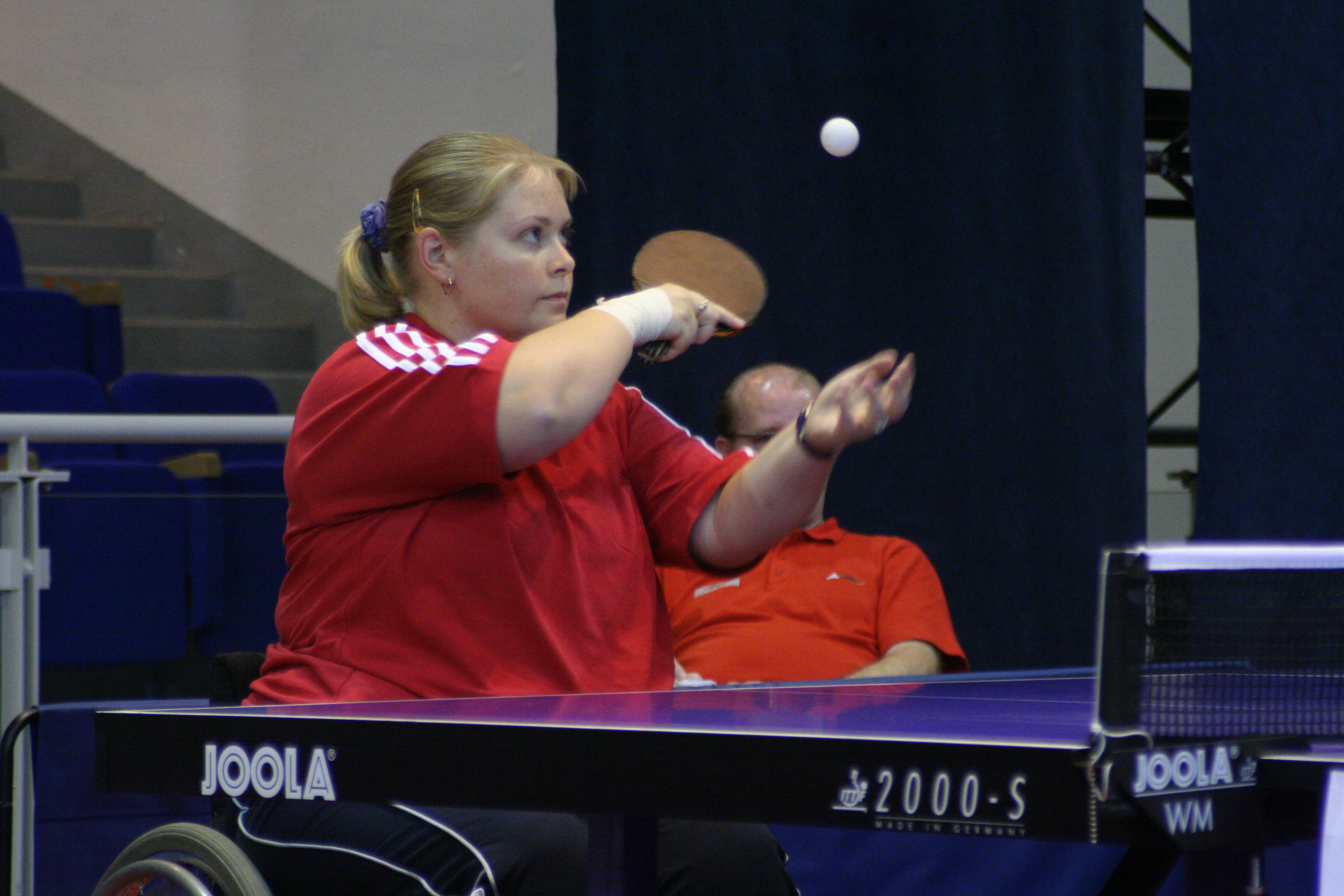
- Bailey at the 2005 Para Table Tennis European Championship

Personal information
- Nationality: United Kingdom
- Born: 19 October 1972 (age 53) Barnsley, South Yorkshire, England
- Occupation: Primary school teacher
- Employer: Shawlands primary school

Sport
- Sport: Women's table tennis
Medal record
Women's Table Tennis
Representing Great Britain
Paralympic Games
Bronze medal – third place	2020 Tokyo	Women's team C4-5
World Championships
Silver medal – second place	2014 Beijing	Women's singles C4
Bronze medal – third place	2006 Montreux	Women's singles C4
European Championships
Gold medal – first place	2005 Jesolo	Women's singles C4
Silver medal – second place	2003 Zagreb	Women's singles C4
Silver medal – second place	2009 Genoa	Women's singles C4
Bronze medal – third place	2001 Frankfurt	Women's teams C4
Bronze medal – third place	2005 Jesolo	Women's teams C4
Bronze medal – third place	2013 Lignano	Women's singles C4-5
Bronze medal – third place	2015 Vejle	Women's teams C4-5
Bronze medal – third place	2017 Lasko	Women's singles C4-5
Bronze medal – third place	2019 Helsingborg	Women's teams C4-5
Representing England
Commonwealth Games
Gold medal – first place	2002 Manchester	Women's EAD Singles – Open Wheelchair
Gold medal – first place	2006 Melbourne	Women's EAD Singles

Susan Fiona Bailey-Robertson, MBE (née Bailey; born 19 October 1972) is a British para table tennis player and primary school teacher. She has competed in six Paralympic Games (2000, 2004, 2008, 2012, 2016 and 2020) and at the Commonwealth Games (2002 and 2006).

Bailey began playing table tennis at the age of 12 but her Ehlers–Danlos syndrome (EDS) made her stop at 15; she also has fibromyalgia and chronic pain syndrome. She started playing again at the age of 18 in a wheelchair.

Competing for England she won a gold medal in singles at the 2002 Commonwealth Games in Manchester and successfully defended her title in Melbourne in 2006.

== Honours ==
In 2009, Bailey was awarded an honorary doctorate by Sheffield Hallam University. In the 2009 Queen's Birthday Honours, she was appointed a Member of the Order of the British Empire (MBE) "for services to Disabled and Able-Bodied Table Tennis and to Sport for Young People.".
