= Živko Papaz =

Serbia Paralympic sport shooter

Personal information
- Born: 1968 (age 57–58) Sarajevo, SFR Yugoslavia
- Years active: 2005–

Sport
- Sport: Paralympic pistol shooting
- Event(s): Men's P1-10m Air Pistol - SH1, Men's P3-25m Pistol - SH1, Men's P4-50m Pistol - SH1
- Club: SKOSI Pobednik Belgrade
- Coached by: Nenad Pajić and Dragan Marković
Medal record
Paralympic pistol shooting
Representing Serbia
World Shooting Para Sport Championships
Silver medal – second place	2019 Sydney	Men's P3-25m Pistol - SH1

Živko Papaz (Serbian Cyrillic: Живко Папаз, born 1968) is a Serbish male paralympic shooter competing in the pistol events. He won a silver medal at the World Shooting Para Sport Championships 2019 in Sydney.

== Early life ==
Živko Papaz was born in 1968. He injured his spinal cord in 1992 while serving in the military.
