= Mitar Palikuća =

Serbian Paralympic para table tennis player

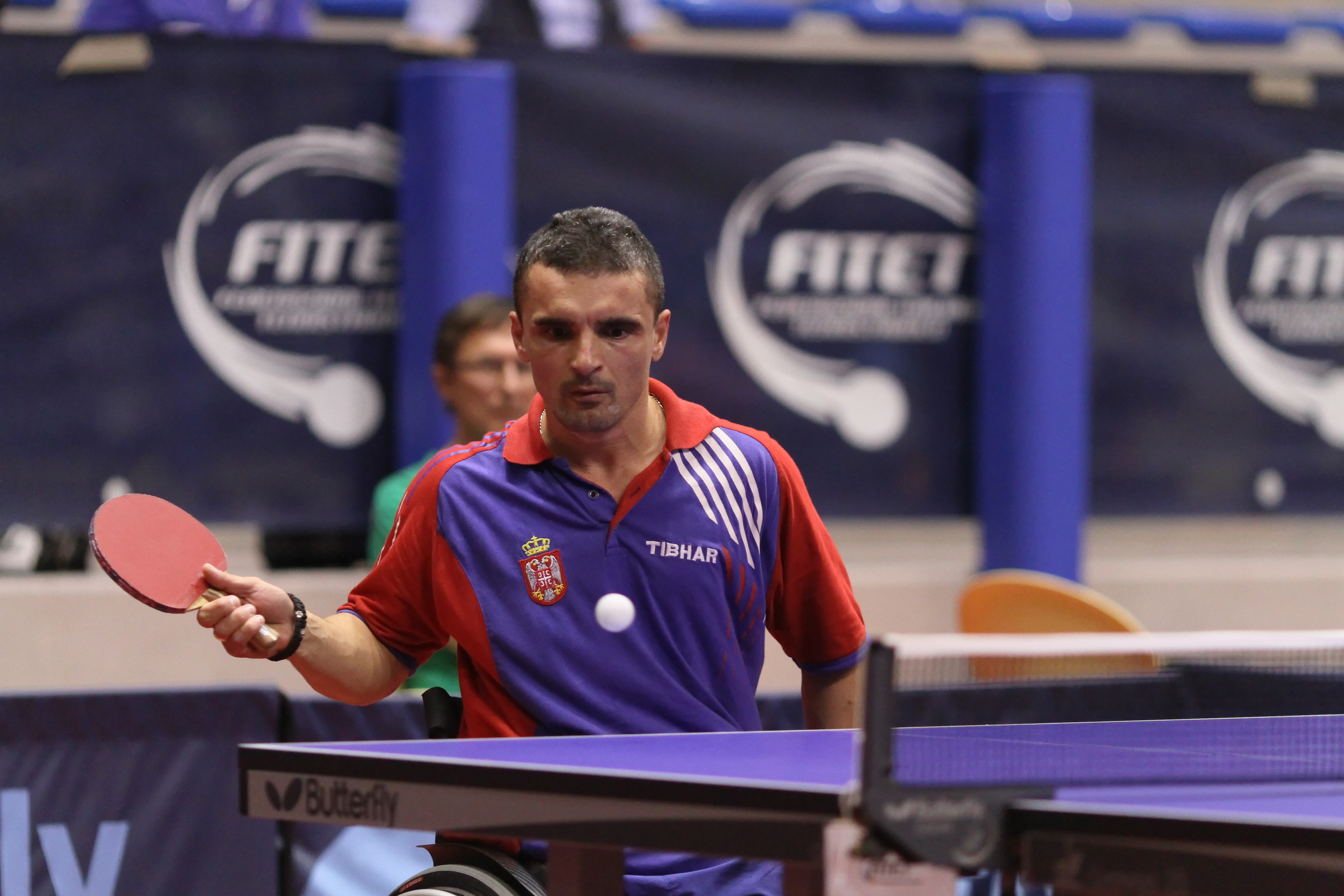

Medal record

Men's table tennis

Representing Serbia

Paralympic Games
Bronze medal – third place	2016 Rio de Janeiro	Individual class 5
Bronze medal – third place	2024 Paris	Singles MS5

World Para Table Tennis Championships
Bronze medal – third place	2014 Beijing	Singles class 5

European Para Table Tennis Championships
Gold medal – first place	2011 Split	Teams class 5
Bronze medal – third place	2011 Split	Singles class 5
Bronze medal – third place	2013 Lignano	Singles class 5
Silver medal – second place	2013 Lignano	Teams class 5
Bronze medal – third place	2015 Vejle	Singles class 5

Mitar Palikuća (Serbian Cyrillic: Митар Паликућа; born 1974, in Šabac) is a Serbian disabled table tennis player.

He has won the first medal for Serbia at Summer Paralympics in Rio.
