= Paralympic Committee of Serbia =

National Paralympic Committee of Serbia

National Paralympic Committee
- Country: Serbia
- Code: SRB
- Created: 1999
- Continental association: EPC
- Headquarters: Belgrade, Serbia
- President: Zoran Mićović
- Secretary General: Bojan Jaćimović
- Website: www.paralympic.rs

The Paralympic Committee of Serbia (Serbian: Параолимпијски комитет Србије / Paraolimpijski komitet Srbije) is the National Paralympic Committee in Serbia for the Paralympic Games movement. It is a non-profit organisation that selects teams, and raises funds to send Serbian competitors to Paralympic events organised by the International Paralympic Committee (IPC).

== See also ==
- Serbia at the Paralympics
