= Laslo Šuranji =

Serbia Paralympic sport shooter

Personal information
- Born: November 6, 1978 (age 48)
- Years active: 2002–present

Sport
- Sport: Paralympic rifle shooting
- Events: Men's R1-10m Air Rifle Standing - SH1, Men's R7-50m Rifle 3 Positions - SH1, Mixed R3-10m Air Rifle Prone - SH1, Mixed R6-50m Rifle Prone
- Club: SKOSI Olimp Zrenjanin
- Coached by: Nenad Pajić and Dragan Marković
Medal record
Representing Serbia
Paralympic rile shooting
Paralympic Games
Gold medal – first place	2016 Rio de Janeiro	Men's R7-50m Rifle 3 Positions - SH1
Silver medal – second place	2020 Tokyo	50 m rifle 3 positions SH1
Bronze medal – third place	2016 Rio de Janeiro	Mixed R6-50m Rifle Prone

Laslo Šuranji (Serbian Cyrillic: Ласло Шурањи), (born November 6, 1978) is a Serbian male paralympic shooter competing in the rifle events. He won a gold and bronze medal at the 2016 Summer Paralympics in Rio de Janeiro. He was named Serbia’s Best Athlete of 2016 by the Serbian Paralympic Committee. At the Tokyo 2020 Paralympic Games, he won the silver medal. He also served as the flag bearer at both the opening and closing ceremonies. He also took part in the Paris 2024 Paralympic Games but did not reach the final.

== Early life ==
Šuranji has paraplegia as a result of injuries he sustained jumping into shallow water.
