= Borislava Perić =

Serbian table tennis player

Borislava Perić-Ranković
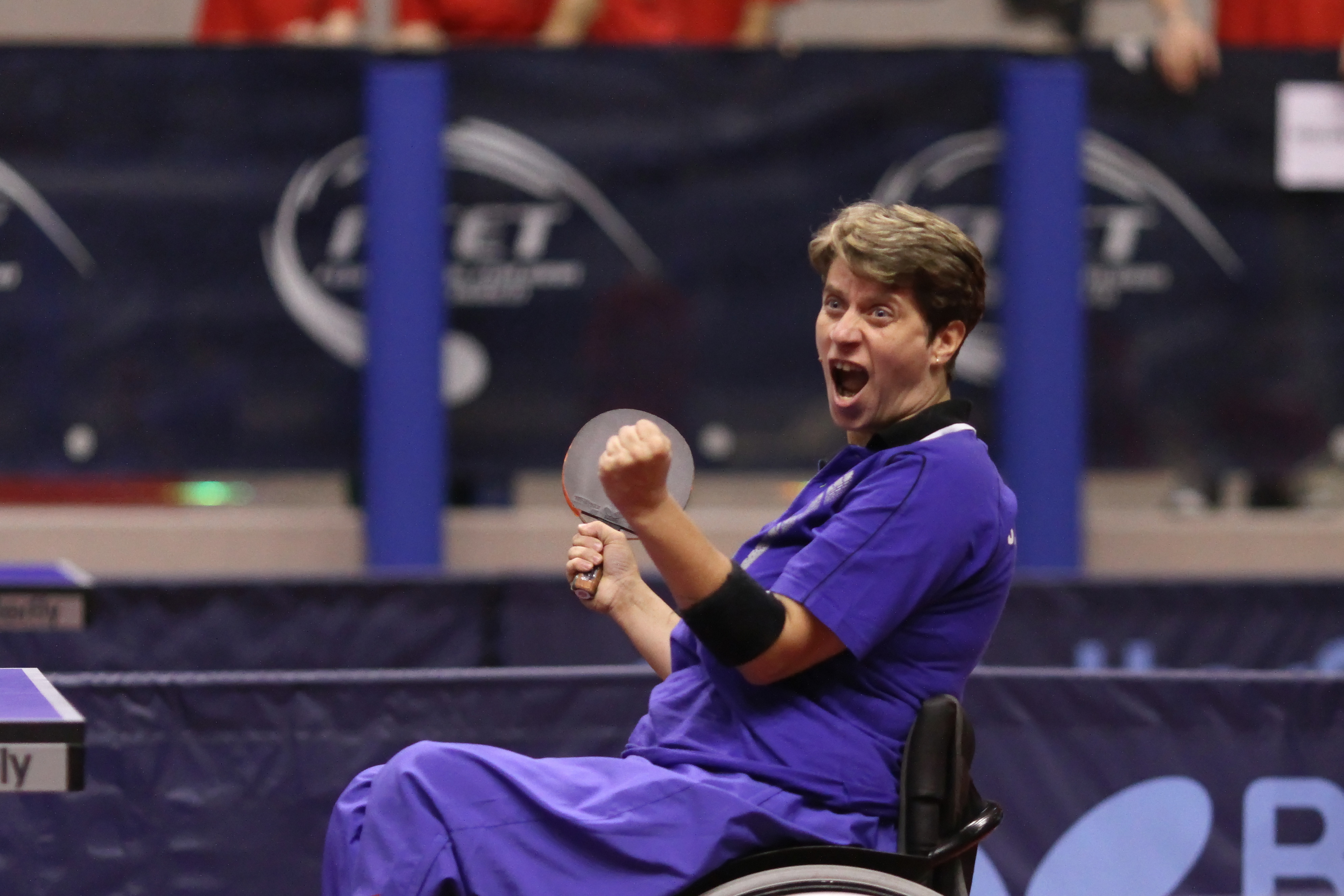

Medal record

Women's table tennis

Representing Serbia

Paralympic Games
Gold medal – first place	2016 Rio de Janeiro	Individual class 4
Silver medal – second place	2008 Beijing	Individual class 4
Silver medal – second place	2012 London	Individual class 4
Silver medal – second place	2016 Rio de Janeiro	Teams class 4-5
Silver medal – second place	2024 Paris	Individual class C4
Silver medal – second place	2024 Paris	Doubles WD10

World Para Table Tennis Championships
Gold medal – first place	2014 Beijing	Teams class 4
Silver medal – second place	2010 Gwangju	Teams class 4
Bronze medal – third place	2014 Beijing	Singles class 4
Bronze medal – third place	2010 Gwangju	Singles class 4

Borislava Perić-Ranković (Serbian Cyrillic: Борислава Перић-Ранковић; born 16 June 1972) is a disabled Serbian table tennis player. She represented Serbia at the 2008, 2012 and 2016 Summer Paralympics in table tennis, winning one gold and three silver medals. She competes in the disability class 4. In the 2016 Summer Paralympics she won her first Paralympic gold medal in the individual class 4 competition, defeating China's Zhang Miao in the finals. At the 2020 Summer Paralympics, she won a bronze medal.

== Life ==
Perić-Ranković was born in Bečej in 1972. She had a workplace accident in 1994, sustaining spinal cord injuries. She has used a wheelchair ever since. She began training table tennis in 2002, and moved to Novi Sad in 2006 to train with trainer Zlatko Kesler.

She has won one gold, one silver and two bronze medals at the 2010 and 2014 World Para Table Tennis Championships.

In 2015, Perić-Ranković received ITTF Star Award for female para table tennis player of the year.

== Parliamentarian ==
In the 2022 Serbian parliamentary election, the governing Serbian Progressive Party (SNS) reserved many of the lead positions on its Together We Can Do Everything electoral list for non-party cultural figures and academics. Perić-Ranković was given the seventh position on the list; this was tantamount to election, and she was indeed elected when the list won a plurality victory with 120 out of 250 mandates.

She is a member of the assembly committee on labour, social issues, social inclusion, and poverty reduction and a deputy member of the committee on education, science, technological development, and the information society.
