= Joyce Oliveira =

Brazilian para table tennis player

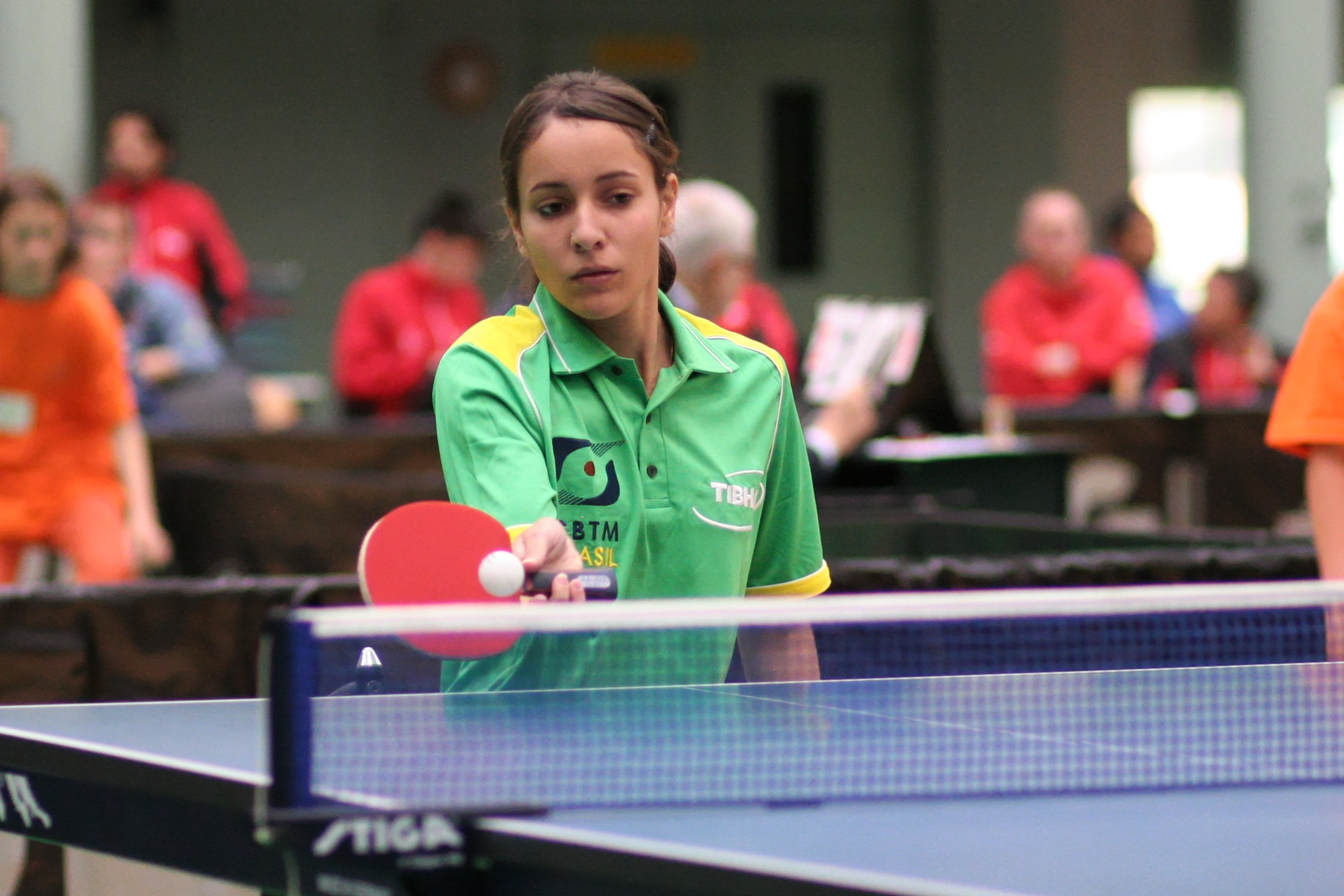
- Oliveira in 2009

Personal information
- Full name: Joyce Fernanda de Oliveira
- Born: 24 June 1990 (age 36) Jundiaí, Brazil

Sport
- Country: Brazil
- Sport: Para table tennis
- Coached by: José Ricardo Rizzone
Medal record
Para table tennis
Representing Brazil
Paralympic Games
Bronze medal – third place	2024 Paris	Doubles WD5
Parapan American Games
Gold medal – first place	2011 Guadalajara	Singles C4
Gold medal – first place	2015 Toronto	Singles C4
Gold medal – first place	2019 Lima	Singles C4
Gold medal – first place	2019 Lima	Teams C2-5
Gold medal – first place	2023 Santiago	Doubles C5-10
Gold medal – first place	2023 Santiago	Mixed doubles C10
Silver medal – second place	2015 Toronto	Teams C4-5
Silver medal – second place	2023 Santiago	Singles C1-3
Bronze medal – third place	2007 Rio de Janeiro	Teams C4-5
Pan American Championships
Gold medal – first place	2013 San Jose	Singles C4-5
Silver medal – second place	2009 Margarita Island	Teams C4-5

Joyce Fernanda de Oliveira (born 24 June 1990) is a Brazilian para table tennis player who competes in international table tennis competitions. She is a six-time Parapan American Games champion and a Pan American champion in singles and doubles, she has also competed at the 2012, 2016 and 2020 Summer Paralympics.

Oliveira became a paraplegic aged twelve when a bus stop fell on top of her.
