= Sandra Mikolaschek =

German para table tennis player

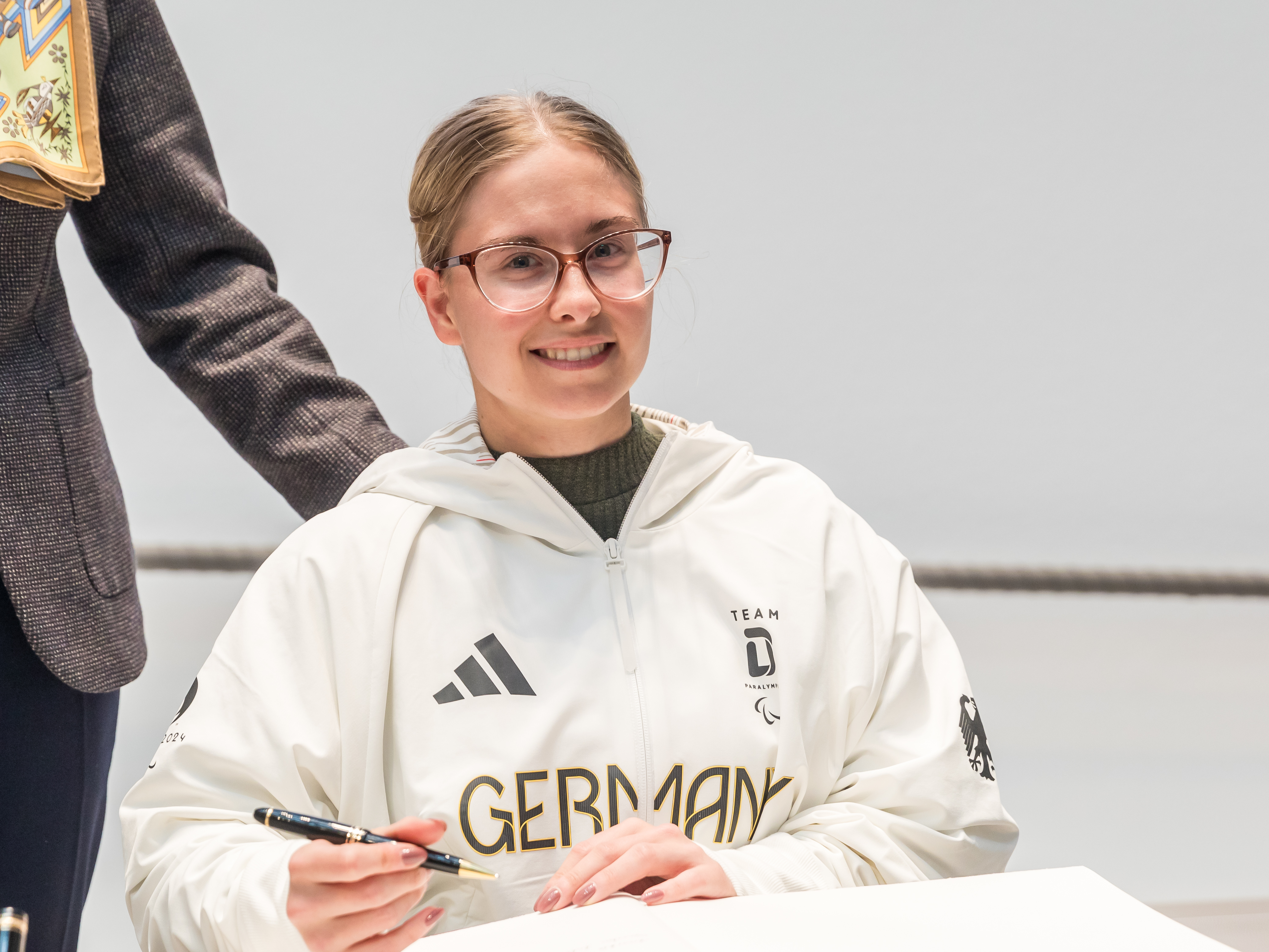
- Sandra Mikolaschek, 2024

Personal information
- Born: 18 June 1997 (age 29) Eisleben, Germany
- Home town: Düsseldorf, Germany

Sport
- Country: Germany
- Sport: Para table tennis
- Disability: Incomplete paraplegia
- Disability class: C4
- Club: Borussia Dusseldorf
- Coached by: Hannes Dößeler
Medal record
Women's para table tennis
Representing Germany
Paralympic Games
Gold medal – first place	2024 Paris	Singles C4
World Championships
Silver medal – second place	2017 Bratislava	Team C4-5
European Championships
Silver medal – second place	2013 Lignano	Singles C4-5
Silver medal – second place	2017 Lasko	Singles C4-5
Bronze medal – third place	2017 Lasko	Teams C4-5
Bronze medal – third place	2019 Helsingborg	Singles C4-5

Sandra Mikolaschek (born 18 June 1997) is a German para table tennis player. She is a World silver medalist and four-time European medalist in singles and team events playing alongside Lisa Hentig.
