= Nada Matić =

Serbian Paralympic table tennis player

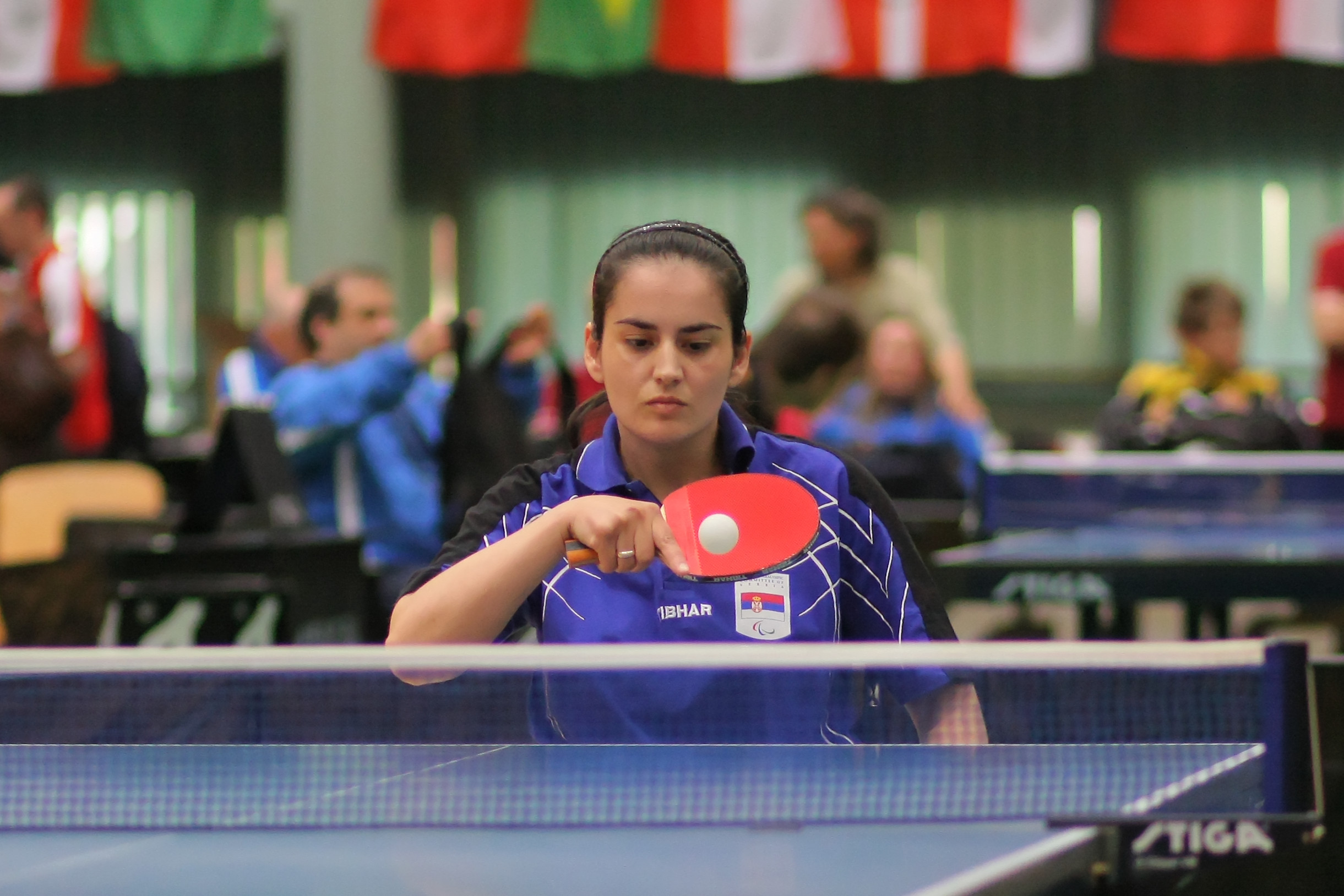

Medal record

Women's table tennis

Representing Serbia

Paralympic Games
Silver medal – second place	2016 Rio de Janeiro	Teams class 4-5
Silver medal – second place	2024 Paris	Doubles WD10
Bronze medal – third place	2016 Rio de Janeiro	Individual class 4

World Para Table Tennis Championships
Gold medal – first place	2014 Beijing	Teams class 4
Silver medal – second place	2010 Gwangju	Teams class 4
Bronze medal – third place	2014 Beijing	Singles class 4

European Para Table Tennis Championships
Silver medal – second place	2007 Kranjska Gora	Teams class 4
Silver medal – second place	2015 Vejle	Teams class 4-5
Silver medal – second place	2015 Vejle	Singles class 4-5

Nada Matić (Serbian Cyrillic: Нада Матић, born in Shkodër, Albania in 1984) is a disabled Serbian table tennis player. In the 2016 Summer Paralympics she won bronze medal in the individual class 4 competition and with Borislava Perić she won silver medal in the Women's team – Class 4–5. She competed at the 2020 Summer Paralympics, in Team C4-5, winning a bronze medal.
