= Zhou Ying (table tennis) =

Chinese para table tennis player

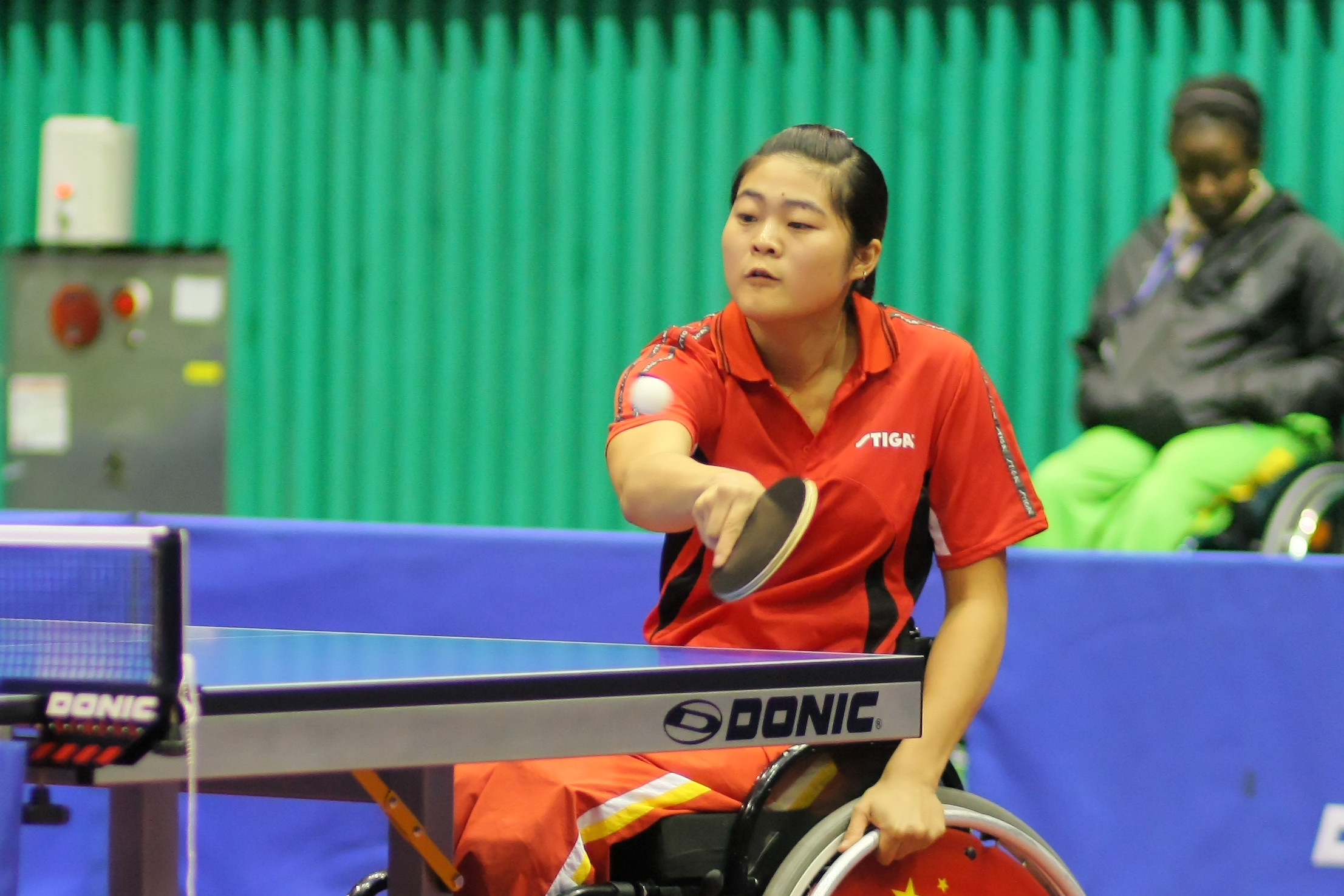
- Zhou at the 2010 World Para Table Tennis Championships

Personal information
- Born: 23 December 1988 (age 37) Pizhou, Jiangsu, China
- Height: 158 cm (5 ft 2 in)
- Weight: 43 kg (95 lb)

Sport
- Sport: Table tennis
- Playing style: Right-handed shakehand grip
- Disability class: 4
- Highest ranking: 1 (January 2007)
- Current ranking: 1(August 2021)
Medal record
Women's para table tennis
Representing China
Paralympic Games
Gold medal – first place	2008 Beijing	Singles C4
Gold medal – first place	2008 Beijing	Teams C4–5
Gold medal – first place	2012 London	Singles C4
Gold medal – first place	2012 London	Teams C4–5
Gold medal – first place	2016 Rio de Janeiro	Teams C4–5
Gold medal – first place	2020 Tokyo	Teams C4-5
Gold medal – first place	2024 Paris	Mixed doubles XD7
Bronze medal – third place	2024 Paris	Singles C4
World Championships
Gold medal – first place	2006 Montreux	Singles C4
Gold medal – first place	2006 Montreux	Teams C5
Gold medal – first place	2010 Gwangju	Singles C4
Gold medal – first place	2010 Gwangju	Teams C5
Gold medal – first place	2010 Gwangju	Open singles in wheelchair
Silver medal – second place	2018 Laško	Singles C4
Asian Para Games
Gold medal – first place	2010 Guangzhou	Singles C4
Gold medal – first place	2014 Incheon	Singles C4
Gold medal – first place	2014 Incheon	Teams C4–5
Gold medal – first place	2018 Jakarta	Singles C4
Gold medal – first place	2018 Jakarta	Teams C2–5
Silver medal – second place	2022 Hangzhou	Singles C4
FESPIC Games
Gold medal – first place	2006 Kuala Lumpur	Singles C4
Gold medal – first place	2006 Kuala Lumpur	Teams C4–5
Silver medal – second place	2006 Kuala Lumpur	Open singles standing
Asian Championships
Gold medal – first place	2005 Kuala Lumpur	Singles C4
Gold medal – first place	2007 Seoul	Singles C4
Gold medal – first place	2007 Seoul	Teams C4–5
Gold medal – first place	2009 Amman	Singles C4
Gold medal – first place	2009 Amman	Teams C4–5
Gold medal – first place	2011 Hong Kong	Teams C4–5
Gold medal – first place	2015 Amman	Singles C4
Gold medal – first place	2015 Amman	Teams C4–5
Gold medal – first place	2019 Taichung	Singles C4
Gold medal – first place	2019 Taichung	Teams C5
Silver medal – second place	2011 Hong Kong	Singles C4
Silver medal – second place	2017 Beijing	Singles C4
Silver medal – second place	2017 Beijing	Teams C4–5
Bronze medal – third place	2009 Amman	Open singles in wheelchair

Zhou Ying (Chinese: 周影; pinyin: Zhōu Yǐng; born 23 December 1988) is a Chinese para table tennis player and gold medalist of Paralympic Games. She won the gold medals of the class 4 of women's individual table tennis at the 2008 Summer Paralympics, and the same class table tennis at the 2012 Summer Paralympics.

== Personal life ==
Like many of her teammates, Zhou had had polio, was from Pizhou, and had attended New Hope Center as a child. In Pizhou, coach Heng Xin developed her into a table tennis player.
