= Table tennis at the 2008 Summer Paralympics – Men's individual – Class 9–10 =

Men's Individual Class 9-10 at the XIII Paralympic Games
- Venue: Peking University Gymnasium
- Dates: 7 – 11 September 2008
- Competitors: 30 from 19 nations

Medalists
1st place, gold medalist(s)		Ge Yang	China
2nd place, silver medalist(s)		Ma Lin	China
3rd place, bronze medalist(s)		Fredrik Andersson	Sweden

The Men's Individual Class 9-10 table tennis competition at the 2008 Summer Paralympics was held between 7 September and 11 September at the Peking University Gymnasium.

Classes 6–10 were for athletes with a physical impairment who competed from a standing position; the lower the number, the greater the impact the impairment had on an athlete’s ability to compete.

The event was won by Ge Yang, representing China.

== Results ==
=== Preliminary round ===
Qualified for the knock-out stages

==== Group A ====
Rank	Competitor	MP	W	L	Points	ESP	FRA	GER
1	Jose Manuel Ruiz (ESP)	2	2	0	6:2	x	3:0	3:2
2	Christophe Rozier (FRA)	2	1	1	3:4	0:3	x	3:1
3	David Korn (GER)	2	0	2	3:6	2:3	1:3	x

7 September, 19:20: Jose Manuel Ruiz (ESP) / 11 / 11 / 12 / 10 / 11; David Korn (GER) / 5 / 2 / 14 / 12 / 5	8 September, 13:20: Christophe Rozier (FRA) / 7 / 11 / 11 / 11; David Korn (GER) / 11 / 8 / 4 / 9	9 September, 13:20: Jose Manuel Ruiz (ESP) / 11 / 12 / 11; Christophe Rozier (FRA) / 6 / 10 / 7

==== Group B ====
Rank	Competitor	MP	W	L	Points	HUN	NGR	CZE
1	Dezso Berecki (HUN)	2	1	1	4:4	x	1:3	3:1
2	Tajudeen Agunbiade (NGR)	2	1	1	4:4	3:1	x	1:3
3	Ivan Karabec (CZE)	2	1	1	4:4	1:3	3:1	x

7 September, 19:20: Ivan Karabec (CZE) / 11 / 6 / 11 / 11; Tajudeen Agunbiade (NGR) / 9 / 11 / 7 / 7	8 September, 13:20: Tajudeen Agunbiade (NGR) / 6 / 11 / 11 / 11; Dezso Berecki (HUN) / 11 / 9 / 7 / 9	9 September, 13:20: Dezso Berecki (HUN) / 11 / 11 / 11 / 12; Ivan Karabec (CZE) / 9 / 13 / 7 / 10

==== Group C ====
Rank	Competitor	MP	W	L	Points	CHN	UKR	ISR
1	Ma Lin (CHN)	2	2	0	6:0	x	3:0	3:0
2	Vadym Kubov (UKR)	2	1	1	3:5	0:3	x	3:2
3	David Altaraz (ISR)	2	0	2	2:6	0:3	2:3	x

7 September, 19:20: Ma Lin (CHN) / 11 / 11 / 11; Vadym Kubov (UKR) / 9 / 7 / 9	8 September, 14:00: Vadym Kubov (UKR) / 11 / 13 / 9 / 9 / 11; David Altaraz (ISR) / 9 / 11 / 11 / 11 / 8	9 September, 12:40: Ma Lin (CHN) / 11 / 12 / 11; David Altaraz (ISR) / 1 / 10 / 8

==== Group D ====
Rank	Competitor	MP	W	L	Points	FRA	RUS	CUB
1	Gilles de la Bourdonnaye (FRA)	2	2	0	6:0	x	3:0	3:0
2	Pavel Lukyanov (RUS)	2	1	1	3:4	0:3	x	3:1
3	Erich Manso (CUB)	2	0	2	1:6	0:3	1:3	x

7 September, 19:20: Gilles de la Bourdonnaye (FRA) / 11 / 11 / 11; Erich Manso (CUB) / 7 / 3 / 6	8 September, 14:00: Pavel Lukyanov (RUS) / 11 / 8 / 11 / 11; Erich Manso (CUB) / 2 / 11 / 4 / 5	9 September, 12:40: Gilles de la Bourdonnaye (FRA) / 11 / 11 / 11; Pavel Lukyanov (RUS) / 3 / 8 / 6

==== Group E ====
Rank	Competitor	MP	W	L	Points	CHN	FRA	HUN
1	Ge Yang (CHN)	2	2	0	6:0	x	3:0	3:0
2	Jérémy Rousseau (FRA)	2	1	1	3:5	0:3	x	3:2
3	Gyula Zborai (HUN)	2	0	2	2:6	0:3	2:3	x

7 September, 19:20: Ge Yang (CHN) / 11 / 11 / 11; Jérémy Rousseau (FRA) / 6 / 4 / 7	8 September, 14:00: Jérémy Rousseau (FRA) / 11 / 11 / 12 / 6 / 11; Gyula Zborai (HUN) / 7 / 8 / 14 / 11 / 8	9 September, 13:20: Ge Yang (CHN) / 11 / 11 / 11; Gyula Zborai (HUN) / 7 / 6 / 8

==== Group F ====
Rank	Competitor	MP	W	L	Points	SWE	ITA	ESP
1	Fredrik Andersson (SWE)	2	2	0	6:0	x	3:0	3:0
2	Manfredi Baroncelli (ITA)	2	1	1	3:4	0:3	x	3:1
3	Jorge Cardona (ESP)	2	0	2	1:6	0:3	1:3	x

7 September, 19:20: Fredrik Andersson (SWE) / 11 / 11 / 11; Manfredi Baroncelli (ITA) / 5 / 8 / 6	8 September, 14:00: Manfredi Baroncelli (ITA) / 11 / 9 / 11 / 15; Jorge Cardona (ESP) / 6 / 11 / 5 / 13	9 September, 13:20: Fredrik Andersson (SWE) / 11 / 11 / 12; Jorge Cardona (ESP) / 9 / 7 / 10

==== Group G ====
Rank	Competitor	MP	W	L	Points	FIN	USA	NED
1	Esa Miettinen (FIN)	2	2	0	6:1	x	3:1	3:0
2	Tahl Leibovitz (USA)	2	1	1	4:3	1:3	x	3:0
3	Tonnie Heijnen (NED)	2	0	2	0:6	0:3	0:3	x

7 September, 19:20: Tahl Leibovitz (USA) / 11 / 11 / 13; Tonnie Heijnen (NED) / 6 / 3 / 11	8 September, 14:00: Esa Miettinen (FIN) / 19 / 11 / 11; Tonnie Heijnen (NED) / 17 / 8 / 9	9 September, 13:20: Esa Miettinen (FIN) / 12 / 11 / 12 / 11; Tahl Leibovitz (USA) / 10 / 9 / 14 / 9

==== Group H ====
Rank	Competitor	MP	W	L	Points	NED	SWE	SVK
1	Gerben Last (NED)	2	2	0	6:0	x	3:0	3:0
2	Linus Karlsson (SWE)	2	1	1	3:4	0:3	x	3:1
3	Ladislav Gáspár (SVK)	2	0	2	1:6	0:3	1:3	x

7 September, 19:20: Linus Karlsson (SWE) / 11 / 11 / 5 / 11; Ladislav Gáspár (SVK) / 7 / 9 / 11 / 8	8 September, 14:00: Gerben Last (NED) / 11 / 11 / 11; Linus Karlsson (SWE) / 9 / 9 / 7	9 September, 13:20: Gerben Last (NED) / 11 / 11 / 11; Ladislav Gáspár (SVK) / 5 / 9 / 6

==== Group I ====
Rank	Competitor	MP	W	L	Points	NGR	UKR	CHN
1	Alabi Olabiyi Olufemi (NGR)	2	2	0	6:0	x	3:0	3:0
2	Yuriy Shchepanskyy (UKR)	2	1	1	3:4	0:3	x	3:1
3	Lu Xiaolei (CHN)	2	0	2	1:6	0:3	1:3	x

7 September, 20:40: Alabi Olabiyi Olufemi (NGR) / 11 / 11 / 15; Lu Xiaolei (CHN) / 8 / 5 / 13	8 September, 14:00: Alabi Olabiyi Olufemi (NGR) / 11 / 11 / 11; Yuriy Shchepanskyy (UKR) / 7 / 9 / 9	9 September, 13:20: Yuriy Shchepanskyy (UKR) / 6 / 13 / 11 / 11; Lu Xiaolei (CHN) / 11 / 11 / 6 / 9

==== Group J ====
Rank	Competitor	MP	W	L	Points	AUT	POL	CZE
1	Stanisław Frączyk (AUT)	2	2	0	6:2	x	3:2	3:0
2	Sebastian Powrozniak (POL)	2	1	1	5:4	2:3	x	3:1
3	Jaroslav Cieslar (CZE)	2	0	2	1:6	0:3	1:3	x

7 September, 20:40: Stanisław Frączyk (AUT) / 11 / 14 / 11; Jaroslav Cieslar (CZE) / 9 / 12 / 5	8 September, 14:00: Sebastian Powrozniak (POL) / 3 / 11 / 11 / 11; Jaroslav Cieslar (CZE) / 11 / 9 / 8 / 5	9 September, 13:20: Stanisław Frączyk (AUT) / 11 / 11 / 7 / 9 / 11; Sebastian Powrozniak (POL) / 2 / 1 / 11 / 11 / 2

=== Competition bracket ===
First round: 9 Sep 17:20
Stanisław Frączyk (AUT)	14	8	3
Fredrik Andersson (SWE)	16	11	11
Gerben Last (NED)	15	11	11
Alabi Olabiyi Olufemi (NGR)	13	8	7

Quarter-finals: 9 Sep 20:40
Jose Manuel Ruiz (ESP)	11	4	11	9	6
Fredrik Andersson (SWE)	6	11	4	11	11
Esa Miettinen (FIN)	1	9	4
Ma Lin (CHN)	11	11	11
Gilles de la Bourdonnaye (FRA)	11	5	8
Ge Yang (CHN)	13	11	11
Gerben Last (NED)	11	11	11
Dezso Berecki (HUN)	5	3	9

Semifinals: 10 Sep 12:15
Fredrik Andersson (SWE)	10	9	9
Ma Lin (CHN)	12	11	11
Ge Yang (CHN)	11	11	11
Gerben Last (NED)	5	9	8

Gold medal match: 11 Sep 19:00
Ma Lin (CHN)	7	12	7	7
Ge Yang (CHN)	11	10	11	11
Bronze medal match: 11 Sep 19:00
Fredrik Andersson (SWE)	11	11	6	11
Gerben Last (NED)	9	7	11	9
