= Table tennis at the 2008 Summer Paralympics – Men's team – Class 9–10 =

Sports Event

Men's Team Class 9–10 at the XIII Paralympic Games
- Venue: Peking University Gymnasium
- Dates: 13 – 16 September 2008
- Competitors: 11

Medalists
1st place, gold medalist(s)		Ge Yang; Chen Chao; Lu Xiaolei; Ma Lin	China
2nd place, silver medalist(s)		Jorge Cardona; Jose Manuel Ruiz	Spain
3rd place, bronze medalist(s)		Jeremy Rousseau; Christophe Rozier; Gilles de la Bourdonnaye	France

The Men's Team Class 9–10 table tennis competition at the 2008 Summer Paralympics was held between 13 September and 16 September at the Peking University Gymnasium. Classes 6–10 were for athletes with a physical impairment who competed from a standing position; the lower the number, the greater the impact the impairment had on an athlete’s ability to compete.

The competition was a straight knock-out format. Each tie was decided by the best of a potential five matches, two singles, a doubles (not necessarily the same players) and two reverse singles.

The event was won by the team representing China.

== Competition bracket ==
Round of 16
Italy	0
Sweden	3
United States	2
Ukraine	3
Netherlands	3
Nigeria	1

Quarterfinals
China	3
Sweden	0
Hungary	1
France	3
Czech Republic	3
Ukraine	1
Netherlands	0
Spain	3

Semifinals
China	3
France	0
Czech Republic	2
Spain	3

Final
China	3
Spain	0
Third place
France	3
Czech Republic	1

== First round ==
13 September 2008; 10:00	Sweden	3–0	Italy

Report	Individual matches
Fredrik Andersson	3–0	Andrea Furlan	11–5, 11–6, 11–6
Linus Karlsson	3–0	Manfredi P. Baroncelli	11–4, 11–5, 11–6
Fredrik Andersson / Linus Karlsson	3–1	Andrea Furlan / Manfredi Baroncelli	11–8, 8–11, 11–5, 11–7

13 September 2008; 10:00	Ukraine	3–2	United States

Report	Individual matches
Vadym Kubov	3–1	Mitchell Seidenfeld	12–10, 9–11, 11–6, 11–4
Yuriy Shchepanskyy	2–3	Tahl Leibovitz	6–11, 11–6, 8–11, 11–1, 5–11
Vadym Kubov / Yuriy Shchepanskyy	3–0	Mitchell Seidenfeld / Tahl Leibovitz	11–6, 11–6, 11–4
Vadym Kubov	2–3	Tahl Leibovitz	17–15, 2–11, 11–7, 12–14, 3–11
Yuriy Shchepanskyy	3–0	Mitchell Seidenfeld	11–6, 11–8, 11–6

13 September 2008; 10:00	Netherlands	3–1	Nigeria

Report	Individual matches
Gerben Last	3–0	Tajudeen Agunbiade	14–12, 11–8, 12–10
Tonnie Heijnen	3–0	Olabiyi Alabi Olufemi	11–9, 11–9, 12–10
Gerben Last / Tonnie Heijnen	1–3	Tajudeen Agunbiade / Olabiyi Alabi Olufemi	7–11, 11–7, 9–11, 6–11
Gerben Last	3–1	Olabiyi Alabi Olufemi	11–9, 11–13, 11–8, 11–8

== Quarter-finals ==
14 September 2008; 10:00	Sweden	0–3	China

Report	Individual matches
Fredrik Andersson	2–3	Ma Lin	5–11, 11–4, 5–11, 15–13, 9–11
Linus Karlsson	0–3	Ge Yang	8–11, 8–11, 6–11
Fredrik Andersson / Linus Karlsson	2–3	Ma Lin / Lu Xiaolei	11–7, 7–11, 11–7, 8–11, 11–13

14 September 2008; 10:00	France	3–1	Hungary

Report	Individual matches
Gilles de la Bourdonnaye	3–1	Gyula Zborai	11–7, 8–11, 12–10, 11–3
Jeremy Rousseau	1–3	Dezso Berecki	11–6, 8–11, 7–11, 7–11
Gilles de la Bourdonnaye / Jeremy Rousseau	3–0	Gyula Zborai / Dezso Berecki	11–8, 11–7, 12–10
Gilles de la Bourdonnaye	3–0	Dezso Berecki	11–6, 12–10, 13–11

14 September 2008; 10:00	Ukraine	1–3	Czech Republic

Report	Individual matches
Yuriy Shchepanskyy	3–2	Jaroslav Cieslar	11–9, 10–12, 6–11, 11–4, 11–3
Vadym Kubov	1–3	Ivan Karabec	8–11, 11–4, 10–12, 5–11
Yuriy Shchepanskyy / Vadym Kubov	2–3	Jaroslav Cieslar / Ivan Karabec	9–11, 11–9, 7–11, 15–13, 8–11
Yuriy Shchepanskyy	0–3	Ivan Karabec	10–12, 6–11, 6–11

14 September 2008; 10:00	Spain	3–0	Netherlands

Report	Individual matches
Jose Manuel Ruiz	3–0	Tonnie Heijnen	11–4, 12–10, 11–3
Jorge Cardona	3–1	Gerben Last	11–2, 11–6, 8–11, 11–6
Jose Manuel Ruiz / Jorge Cardona	3–0	Tonnie Heijnen / Gerben Last	11–5, 11–6, 11–7

== Semi-finals ==
15 September 2008; 12:30	France	0–3	China

Report	Individual matches
Gilles de la Bourdonnaye	0–3	Ma Lin	4–11, 3–11, 5–11
Jeremy Rousseau	0–3	Ge Yang	3–11, 5–11, 6–11
Gilles de la Bourdonnaye / Jeremy Rousseau	0–3	Ma Lin / Ge Yang	3–11, 11–13, 7–11

15 September 2008; 12:30	Spain	3–2	Czech Republic

Report	Individual matches
Jose Manuel Ruiz	3–0	Jaroslav Cieslar	11–8, 11–8, 11–9
Jorge Cardona	1–3	Ivan Karabec	11–6, 9–11, 4–11, 11–13
Jose Manuel Ruiz / Jorge Cardona	3–2	Jaroslav Cieslar / Ivan Karabec	11–8, 3–11, 11–8, 10–12, 11–3
Jose Manuel Ruiz	2–3	Ivan Karabec	12–10, 9–11, 11–7, 3–11, 10–12
Jorge Cardona	3–1	Jaroslav Cieslar	11–9, 11–7, 12–14, 11–9

== Finals ==
Gold medal match

16 September 2008; 19:00	Spain	0–3	China

Report	Individual matches
Jose Manuel Ruiz	2–3	Ma Lin	7–11, 11–8, 11–7, 4–11, 10–12
Jorge Cardona	0–3	Ge Yang	5–11, 11–13, 8–11
Jose Manuel Ruiz / Jorge Cardona	1–3	Ma Lin / Ge Yang	11–6, 12–14, 3–11, 8–11

Bronze medal match

16 September 2008; 19:00	France	3–1	Czech Republic

Report	Individual matches
Gilles de la Bourdonnaye	3–1	Jaroslav Cieslar	10–12, 11–3, 11–7, 1–1
Jeremy Rousseau	0–3	Ivan Karabec	8–11, 4–11, 6–11
Gilles de la Bourdonnaye / Jeremy Rousseau	3–1	Jaroslav Cieslar / Ivan Karabec	11–4, 12–10, 8–11, 11–7
Gil de la Bourdonnaye	3–0	Ivan Karabec	13–11, 11–7, 11–3

== Team Lists ==
China; Ge Yang; Chen Chao; Lu Xiaolei; Ma Lin	Italy; Andrea Furlan; Manfredi Baroncelli	Sweden; Linus Karlsson; Fredrik Andersson	Hungary; Gyula Zborai; Dezso Berecki
France; Jeremy Rousseau; Christophe Rozier; Gilles de la Bourdonnaye	Czech Republic; Zbynek Lambert; Jaroslav Cieslar; Ivan Karabec	United States; Mitchell Seidenfeld; Tahl Leibovitz	Ukraine; Vadym Kubov; Yuriy Shchepanskyy
Netherlands; Tonnie Heijnen; Gerben Last	Nigeria; Tajudeen Agunbiade; Alabi Olabiyi Olufemi	Spain; Jorge Cardona; Jose Manuel Ruiz	
