= Table tennis at the 2012 Summer Paralympics – Men's team – Class 9–10 =

Table tennis Men's team C9-10 at the XIV Paralympic Games
- Venue: ExCeL Exhibition Centre
- Dates: 5–8 September 2012

Medalists
| 1st place, gold medalist(s) | | Ma Lin; Lian Hao; Lu Xiaolei; Ge Yang | China |
| 2nd place, silver medalist(s) | | Patryk Chojnowski; Sebastian Powroźniak | Poland |
| 3rd place, bronze medalist(s) | | Jorge Cardona; José Manuel Ruiz Reyes | Spain |

The men's team class 9-10 table tennis event was part of the table tennis programme at the 2012 Summer Paralympics in London. The event took place from Wednesday 5 September to Saturday 8 September.

== Bracket ==
The draw for team events took place on 28 August 2012.

First Round
1
16
Egypt (EGY) | 2
Netherlands (NED) | 3
Brazil (BRA) | 1
Malaysia (MAS) | 3
13
4
3
14
France (FRA) | 2
Sweden (SWE) | 3
Russia (RUS) | 2
Hungary (HUN) | 3
15
2

Quarterfinals
1 | China (CHN) | 3
Netherlands (NED) | 0
Malaysia (MAS) | 1
4 | Ukraine (UKR) | 3
3 | Poland (POL) | 3
Sweden (SWE) | 2
Hungary (HUN) | 0
2 | Spain (ESP) | 3

Semifinals
1 | China (CHN) | 3
4 | Ukraine (UKR) | 0
3 | Poland (POL) | 3
2 | Spain (ESP) | 2

Gold Medal Match
1 | China (CHN) | 3
3 | Poland (POL) | 2
Bronze Medal Match
4 | Ukraine (UKR) | 1
2 | Spain (ESP) | 3

== Results ==
=== First round ===
| 5 September 2012; 19:00 | Egypt | 2–3 | Netherlands |

| Report | Individual matches |
| Abdelrahman Abdelwahab | 0–3 | Gerben Last | 7–11, 5–11, 3–11 |
| Sayed Youssef | 3–1 | Tonnie Heijnen | 11–9, 11–13, 12–10, 11–8 |
| Abdelrahman Abdelwahab | 3–2 | Tonnie Heijnen | 5–11, 11–7, 6–11, 11–8, 12–10 |
| Sayed Youssef | 0–3 | Gerben Last | 4–11, 5–11, 6–11 |
| Abdelrahman Abdelwahab, Sayed Youssef | 0–3 | Gerben Last / Tonnie Heijnen | 8–11, 7–11, 9–11 |

| 5 September 2012; 19:00 | Brazil | 1–3 | Malaysia |

| Report | Individual matches |
| Paulo Salmin | 1–3 | Zhi Liang Koh | 8–11, 6–11, 11–9, 7–11 |
| Carlos Carbinatti | 3–2 | Mohamad Azwar Bakar | 8–11, 12–10, 11–9, 0–11, 11–9 |
| Paulo Salmin | 0–3 | Mohamad Azwar Bakar | 4–11, 5–11, 6–11 |
| Carlos Carbinatti | 2–3 | Zhi Liang Koh | 6–11, 15–13, 8–11, 11–6, 9–11 |

| 5 September 2012; 19:00 | France | 2–3 | Sweden |

| Report | Individual matches |
| Thomas Bouvois | 3–0 | Linus Karlsson | 11–7, 11–3, 11–6 |
| Cedrik Cabestany | 2–3 | Fredrik Andersson | 4–11, 11–4, 11–9, 9–11, 3–11 |
| Cedrik Cabestany | 3–1 | Linus Karlsson | 11–6, 8–11, 11–9, 11–9 |
| Thomas Bouvois | 0–3 | Fredrik Andersson | 10–12, 11–13, 5–11 |
| Thomas Bouvois / Cedrik Cabestany | 0–3 | Fredrik Andersson / Linus Karlsson | 5–11, 7–11, 6–11 |

| 5 September 2012; 19:00 | Russia | 2–3 | Hungary |

| Report | Individual matches |
| Pavel Lukyanov | 3–0 | Dezső Berecki | 12–10, 12–10, 11–8 |
| Iurii Nozdrunov | 3–2 | András Csonka | 8–11, 11–4, 11–7, 9–11, 5–11 |
| Pavel Lukyanov | 3–0 | András Csonka | 11–6, 12–10, 11–5 |
| Iurii Nozdrunov | 0–3 | Dezső Berecki | 8–11, 5–11, 7–11 |
| Pavel Lukyanov / Iurii Nozdrunov | 2–3 | Dezső Berecki / András Csonka | 12–10, 9–11, 13–11, 12–14, 9–11 |

=== Quarter-finals ===
| 6 September 2012; 16:30 | China | 3–0 | Netherlands |

| Report | Individual matches |
| Ma Lin | 3–0 | Gerben Last | 11–4, 11–9, 11–6 |
| Ge Yang | 3–0 | Tonnie Heijnen | 11–4, 11–3, 11–2 |
| Ge Yang | 3–0 | Gerben Last | 11–9, 11–3, 11–4 |

| 6 September 2012; 16:30 | Malaysia | 1–3 | Ukraine |

| Report | Individual matches |
| Mohamad Azwar Bakar | 3–2 | Vadym Kubov | 11–5, 7–11, 7–11, 11–9, 11–7 |
| Koh Zhi Liang | 0–3 | Yuriy Shchepanskyy | 4–11, 8–11, 9–11 |
| Mohamad Azwar Bakar | 1–3 | Yuriy Shchepanskyy | 11–8, 9–11, 5–11, 6–11 |
| Koh Zhi Liang | 1–3 | Vadym Kubov | 4–11, 11–4, 5–11, 8–11 |

| 6 September 2012; 16:30 | Poland | 3–2 | Sweden |

| Report | Individual matches |
| Sebastian Powrozniak | 1–3 | Linus Karlsson | 4–11, 11–9, 3–11, 7–11 |
| Patryk Chojnowski | 3–0 | Fredrik Andersson | 11–4, 11–1, 13–11 |
| Patryk Chojnowski | 3–0 | Linus Karlsson | 11–4, 11–9, 11–3 |
| Sebastian Powrozniak | 1–3 | Fredrik Andersson | 6–11, 8–11, 11–6, 8–11 |
| Sebastian Powrozniak / Patryk Chojnowski | 3–2 | Linus Karlsson / Fredrik Andersson | 6–11, 11–3, 6–11, 11–5, 11–8 |

| 6 September 2012; 16:30 | Hungary | 0–3 | Spain |

| Report | Individual matches |
| András Csonka | 0–3 | Jorge Cardona | 8–11, 8–11, 8–11 |
| Dezso Berecki | 1–3 | Jose Manuel Ruiz Reyes | 13–11, 4–11, 11–13, 5–11 |
| András Csonka | 0–3 | Jose Manuel Ruiz Reyes | 5–11, 6–11, 8–11 |

=== Semi-finals ===
| 7 September 2012; 10:00 | China | 3–0 | Ukraine |

| Report | Individual matches |
| Ma Lin | 3–0 | Yuriy Shchepanskyy | 11–4, 11–9, 15–13 |
| Ge Yang | 3–0 | Vadym Kubov | 14–12, 14–12, 11–2 |
| Ge Yang | 3–0 | Yuriy Shchepanskyy | 11–7, 12–10, 12–10 |

| 7 September 2012; 10:00 | Poland | 3–2 | Spain |

| Report | Individual matches |
| Patryk Chojnowski | 3–0 | Jorge Cardona | 11–2, 11–6, 11–6 |
| Sebastian Powroźniak | 1–3 | José Manuel Ruíz Reyes | 5–11, 5–11, 11–8, 7–11 |
| Patryk Chojnowski | 3–2 | José Manuel Ruíz Reyes | 11–6, 7–11, 8–11, 11–7, 11–4 |
| Sebastian Powroźniak | 0–3 | José Manuel Ruíz Reyes | 3–11, 9–11, 2–11 |
| Patryk Chojnowski / Sebastian Powroźniak | 3–0 | Jorge Cardona / José Manuel Ruíz Reyes | 11–6, 11–7, 11–9 |

=== Finals ===
Gold medal match

| 8 September 2012; 19:00 | China | 3–2 | Poland |

| Report | Individual matches |
| Ma Lin | 2–3 | Patryk Chojnowski | 3–11, 6–11, 11–3, 11–9, 7–11 |
| Ge Yang | 3–1 | Sebastian Powroźniak | 11–2, 11–6, 8–11, 11–3 |
| Ge Yang | 0–3 | Patryk Chojnowski | 9–11, 9–11, 6–11 |
| Ma Lin | 3–1 | Sebastian Powroźniak | 9–11, 11–3, 11–5, 11–7 |
| Ma Lin / Ge Yang | 3–1 | Patryk Chojnowski / Sebastian Powroźniak | 11–8, 11–9, 9–11, 11–6 |

Bronze medal match

| 8 September 2012; 19:00 | Ukraine | 1–3 | Spain |

| Report | Individual matches |
| Vadym Kubov | 2–3 | José Manuel Ruiz Reyes | 5–11, 11–6, 11–5, 7–11, 6–11 |
| Yuriy Shchepanskyy | 0–3 | Jorge Cardona | 9–11, 7–11, 5–11 |
| Yuriy Shchepanskyy | 3–2 | José Manuel Ruíz Reyes | 8–11, 11–8, 12–10, 5–11, 15–13 |
| Vadym Kubov | 0–3 | Jorge Cardona | 6–11, 9–11, 13–15 |

== See also ==
- Table tennis at the 2012 Summer Paralympics
