= Nigeria at the 2008 Summer Paralympics =

- IPC code: NGR
- NPC: Nigeria Paralympic Committee

in Beijing
- Competitors: 28 in 4 sports
- Flag bearer: Adekunle Adesoji
- Officials: 14
- Medals Ranked 30th: Gold 4 Silver 4 Bronze 1 Total 9

Summer Paralympics appearances (overview)
- 1992; 1996; 2000; 2004; 2008; 2012; 2016; 2020; 2024

Nigeria sent a delegation to compete at the 2008 Summer Paralympics in Beijing, China. The country was represented by 28 athletes competing in four sports: powerlifting, table tennis, wheelchair tennis and track and field. The Nigerian team included eight powerlifters.

== Medalists ==
The Nigerian Paralympic delegation left the Games having won more medals than their Olympic counterparts.

Medal	Name	Sport	Event
Gold	Eucharia Njideka Iyiazi	Athletics	Women's discus throw F57/58
Gold	Eucharia Njideka Iyiazi	Athletics	Women's shot put F57/58
Gold	Lucy Ogechukwu Ejike	Powerlifting	Women's 48 kg
Gold	Ruel Ishaku	Powerlifting	Men's 48 kg
Silver	Adekunle Adesoji	Athletics	Men's 100 m T12
Silver	Obioma Daleth Aligekwe	Powerlifting	Men's 100 kg
Silver	Grace Ebere Anozie	Powerlifting	Women's +82.5 kg
Silver	Amoge Victoria Nneji	Powerlifting	Women's 67.5 kg
Bronze	Patience Aghimile Igbiti	Powerlifting	Women's 60 kg

=== Athletics ===
==== Men's track ====
Athlete	Class	Event	Heats		Semifinal		Final	
Athlete	Class	Event	Result	Rank	Result	Rank	Result	Rank
Adekunle Adesoji	T12	100m	11.05	2 Q	11.00	3 Q	10.95	2nd place, silver medalist(s)
Adekunle Adesoji	T12	200m	22.35	3 q	22.46	5 B	22.48	5
Ayuba Cheledi Abdullahi	T46	100m	DSQ		did not advance			
Godwin Joseph Mbakara	T46	100m	11.24	7 q	—		11.37	7
Serge Ornem	T46	100m	11.31	9	did not advance			
Olusegun Francis Rotawo	T11	100m	11.58	9 Q	11.51	6 B	11.60	6
Bashiru Yunusa	T46	100m	DNS		did not advance			
Bashiru Yunusa	T46	400m	50.20	7 Q	—		DNS	

==== Men's field ====
Athlete	Class	Event	Final		
Athlete	Class	Event	Result	Points	Rank
Chinedu Silver Ezeikpe	F57-58	Discus throw	50.42 SB	945	8
Chinedu Silver Ezeikpe	F57-58	Javelin throw	45.86	973	5
Chinedu Silver Ezeikpe	F57-58	Shot put	13.29	888	10

==== Women's track ====
Athlete	Class	Event	Heats		Final	
Athlete	Class	Event	Result	Rank	Result	Rank
Goodness Chinasa Duru	T46	200m	27.09	9	did not advance	
Patricia Ndidiamaka Nnaji	T54	200m	33.00	12	did not advance	

==== Women's field ====
Athlete	Class	Event	Final		
Athlete	Class	Event	Result	Points	Rank
Eucharia Njideka Iyiazi	F57-58	Discus throw	35.21 PR	1120	1st place, gold medalist(s)
Eucharia Njideka Iyiazi	F57-58	Javelin throw	26.11 SB	885	6
Eucharia Njideka Iyiazi	F57-58	Shot put	10.96 WR	1128	1st place, gold medalist(s)

=== Powerlifting ===
==== Men ====
Athlete	Event	Attempt 1	Attempt 2	Attempt 3	Attempt 4	Rank
Solomon Amarakwuo	-90kg	NMR				
Obioma Alegakewue	-100kg	~~230.0~~	235.0	245.0	~~248.0~~	2nd place, silver medalist(s)
Ruel Ishaku	-48kg	155.0	160.0	167.5	169.0 WR	1st place, gold medalist(s)

==== Women ====
Athlete	Event	Attempt 1	Attempt 2	Attempt 3	Rank
Grace Ebere Alozie	+82.5kg	157.5	165.0 PR	~~167.5~~	2nd place, silver medalist(s)
Lucy Ogechukwu Ejike	-48kg	125.0 WR	130.0 WR	~~137.5~~	1st place, gold medalist(s)
Patience Aghimile Igbiti	-60kg	110.0	~~115.0~~	~~115.0~~	3rd place, bronze medalist(s)
Amoge Victoria Nneji	-67.5kg	125.0	132.5	~~142.5~~	2nd place, silver medalist(s)
Adedeji Kike Ogunbamiwo	-82.5kg	~~125.0~~	125.0	127.5	4

=== Table tennis ===
==== Men ====
Athlete	Event	Preliminaries			Round of 16	Quarterfinals	Semifinals	Final / BM	
Athlete	Event	Opposition Result	Opposition Result	Rank	Opposition Result	Opposition Result	Opposition Result	Opposition Result	Rank
Tajudeen Agunbiade	Men's singles C9-10	Berecki (HUN); W 3-1	Karabec (CZE); L 1-3	2	did not advance				
Oluade Egbinola	Men's singles C3	Geva (ISR); L 1-3	Kramminger (AUT); L 1-3	3	did not advance				
Alabi Olabiyi Olufemi	Men's singles C9-10	Shchepanskyy (UKR); W 3-0	Lu X (CHN); W 3-0	1 Q	Last (NED); L 0-3	did not advance			
Nasiru Sule	Men's singles C4-5	Durand (FRA); L 0–3	Bai (CHN); L 0–3	3	did not advance				
Oluade Egbinola; Nasiru Sule	Men's team C4-5	—			China (CHN); L 1-3	did not advance			
Tajudeen Agunbiade; Alabi Olabiyi Olufemi	Men's team C9-10	—			Netherlands (NED); L 1-3	did not advance			

==== Women ====
Athlete	Event	Preliminaries				Semifinals	Final / BM	
Athlete	Event	Opposition Result	Opposition Result	Opposition Result	Rank	Opposition Result	Opposition Result	Rank
Faith Chineny Obiora	Women's singles C4	Moon S H (KOR); L 0–3	Zorzetto (ITA); L 1–3	Robertson (GBR); W 3–1	3	did not advance		

=== Wheelchair tennis ===
Athlete	Event	Round of 64	Round of 32	Round of 16	Quarterfinals	Semifinals	Final	
Athlete	Event	Opposition Result	Opposition Result	Opposition Result	Opposition Result	Opposition Result	Opposition Result	Rank
Wasiu Yusuf	Men's singles	Olsson (SWE); L 2–6, 1–6	did not advance					

== See also ==
- Nigeria at the Paralympics
- Nigeria at the 2008 Summer Olympics
