= Table tennis at the 2012 Summer Paralympics – Men's individual – Class 10 =

Men's standing class 10 table tennis at 2012 Paralympics

Table tennis Men's C10 at the XIV Paralympic Games
- Venue: ExCeL Exhibition Centre
- Dates: 30 August – 2 September 2012
- Competitors: 12 from 10 nations

Medalists
1st place, gold medalist(s)		Patryk Chojnowski	Poland
2nd place, silver medalist(s)		Ge Yang	China
3rd place, bronze medalist(s)		David Jacobs	Indonesia

The Men's individual table tennis – Class 10 tournament at the 2012 Summer Paralympics in London took place from 30 August to 2 September 2012 at ExCeL Exhibition Centre. Classes 6–10 were for athletes with a physical impairment who competed from a standing position; the lower the number, the greater the impact the impairment was on an athlete’s ability to compete.

In the preliminary stage, athletes competed in four groups of three. Winners of each group qualified for the semi-finals, together with four seeded players given byes for the preliminary round.

== Results ==
All times are local (BST/UTC+1)

=== Finals ===
Quarter-finals: 1 Sep 12:30
1	Ge Yang (CHN)	4	12	9	11	11
Ivan Karabec (CZE)	11	10	11	5	6
Lu Xiaolei (CHN)	10	11	10	3
4	David Jacobs (INA)	12	8	12	11
3	Patryk Chojnowski (POL)	11	11	11
Lian Hao (CHN)	8	8	6
Dezso Berecki (HUN)	11	5	11	7	8
2	Jose Manuel Ruiz Reyes (ESP)	9	11	6	11	11

Semifinals: 1 Sep 19:45
1	Ge Yang (CHN)	13	12	5	13
4	David Jacobs (INA)	11	10	11	11
3	Patryk Chojnowski (POL)	14	12	11
2	Jose Manuel Ruiz Reyes (ESP)	12	10	4

Gold medal match: 2 Sep 20:15
1	Ge Yang (CHN)	9	4	9
3	Patryk Chojnowski (POL)	11	11	11
Bronze medal match
4	David Jacobs (INA)	11	7	11	11
2	Jose Manuel Ruiz Reyes (ESP)	9	11	5	6

=== Preliminary round ===
Qualified for the quarter-finals

==== Group A ====
Athlete	Won	Lost	Games diff	Points diff
Lian Hao (CHN)	2	0	+2	0
Kim Daybell (GBR)	1	1	+2	+17
Carlos Carbinatti (BRA)	0	2	-4	-17

30 August, 16:00

Lian Hao (CHN)	13	6	13	7	11
Carlos Carbinatti (BRA)	11	11	11	11	6

31 August, 12:20

Carlos Carbinatti (BRA)	4	9	3
Kim Daybell (GBR)	11	11	11

31 August, 20:00

Lian Hao (CHN)	9	5	11	16	11
Kim Daybell (GBR)	11	11	9	14	7

==== Group B ====
Athlete	Won	Lost	Games diff	Points diff
Lu Xiaolei (CHN)	1	1	+1	+6
Mohamad Azwar Bakar (MAS)	1	1	0	-5
Pavel Lukyanov (RUS)	1	1	-1	-1

30 August, 16:00

Pavel Lukyanov (RUS)	11	9	9	7
Mohamad Azwar Bakar (MAS)	8	11	11	11

31 August, 12:20

Mohamad Azwar Bakar (MAS)	3	12	11	10
Lu Xiaolei (CHN)	11	10	13	12

31 August, 20:00

Pavel Lukyanov (RUS)	9	8	11	11	11
Lu Xiaolei (CHN)	11	11	6	9	9

==== Group C ====
Athlete	Won	Lost	Games diff	Points diff
Ivan Karabec (CZE)	2	0	+6	+17
Jorge Cardona (ESP)	1	1	-1	+9
Sebastian Powrozniak (POL)	0	2	-5	-26

30 August, 16:00

Ivan Karabec (CZE)	11	11	13
Sebastian Powrozniak (POL)	8	8	11

31 August, 12:20

Sebastian Powrozniak (POL)	6	5	12	2
Jorge Cardona (ESP)	11	11	10	11

31 August, 20:00

Ivan Karabec (CZE)	11	11	12
Jorge Cardona (ESP)	9	6	10

==== Group D ====
Athlete	Won	Lost	Games diff	Points diff
Dezső Berecki (HUN)	1	1	+1	-6
Fredrik Andersson (SWE)	1	1	+1	+14
Abdelrahman Abdelwahab (EGY)	1	1	-2	-8

30 August, 16:00

Fredrik Andersson (SWE)	4	8	11	11	9
Abdelrahman Abdelwahab (EGY)	11	11	3	5	11

31 August, 12:20

Abdelrahman Abdelwahab (EGY)	9	9	12
Dezső Berecki (HUN)	11	11	14

31 August, 20:00

Fredrik Andersson (SWE)	11	11	5	11
Dezső Berecki (HUN)	4	5	11	6
