= Table tennis at the 2004 Summer Paralympics – Men's team – Class 10 =

Table Tennis - Men's Teams 10 at the XII Paralympic Games
- Paralympic Table Tennis
- Venue: Galatsi Olympic Hall
- Dates: 23–27 September 2004
- Competitors: 8

Medalists
1st place, gold medalist(s)		Lu Xiaolei; Ge Yang	China
2nd place, silver medalist(s)		Francois Serignat; Olivier Chateigner; Gilles de la Bourdonnaye	France
3rd place, bronze medalist(s)		Magnus Andree; Fredrik Andersson	Sweden

The Men's Teams 10 table tennis competition at the 2004 Summer Paralympics was held from 23 to 27 September at the Galatsi Olympic Hall.

Classes 6–10 were for athletes with a physical impairment who competed from a standing position; the lower the number, the greater the impact the impairment had on an athlete's ability to compete.

The event was won by the team representing China.

== Results ==
=== Preliminaries ===
Qualified for final round

==== Group A ====
Rank	Competitor	MP	W	L	Points	CZE	SWE	ITA	HUN
1	Czech Republic	3	3	0	9:2	x	3:1	3:1	3:0
2	Sweden	3	2	1	7:4	1:3	x	3:0	3:1
3	Italy	2	0	2	1:6	1:3	0:3	x	DNS
4	Hungary	2	0	2	1:6	0:3	1:3	W/O	x

==== Group B ====
Rank	Competitor	MP	W	L	Points	CHN	FRA	ESP	ISR
1	China	3	3	0	9:4	x	3:2	3:1	3:1
2	France	2	1	1	5:5	2:3	x	3:2	DNS
3	Spain	3	1	2	6:7	1:3	2:3	x	3:1
4	Israel	2	0	2	2:6	1:3	W/O	1:3	x

=== Competition bracket ===
Semi-finals
Czech Republic	1
France	3
Sweden	1
China	3

Final
France	1
China	3
Third place
Czech Republic	1
Sweden	3

== Team Lists ==
Czech Republic; Jaroslav Cieslar; Miroslav Cinibulk; Ivan Karabec; Tomas Vrbka	Sweden; Magnus Andree; Fredrik Andersson	Hungary; Gyula Zborai; Dezso Bereczki; Zsolt Bereczki; András Csonka	Italy; Andrea Furlan; Paolo Pietro Puglisi
China; Lu Xiaolei; Ge Yang	France; Francois Serignat; Olivier Chateigner; Gilles de la Bourdonnaye	Spain; Jose Manuel Ruiz; Enrique Agudo	Israel; Zeev Glikman; David Altaratz
