= Table tennis at the 2004 Summer Paralympics – Men's individual – Class 9 =

Table Tennis - Men's Singles 9 at the XII Paralympic Games
- Paralympic Table Tennis
- Venue: Galatsi Olympic Hall
- Dates: 18–21 September 2004
- Competitors: 18 from 12 nations

Medalists
1st place, gold medalist(s)		Stanisław Frączyk	Austria
2nd place, silver medalist(s)		Lu Xiaolei	China
3rd place, bronze medalist(s)		Tahl Leibovitz	United States

The Men's Singles 9 table tennis competition at the 2004 Summer Paralympics was held from 18 to 21 September at the Galatsi Olympic Hall.

Classes 6–10 were for athletes with a physical impairment who competed from a standing position; the lower the number, the greater the impact the impairment had on an athlete’s ability to compete.

The event was won by Stanisław Frączyk, representing Austria.

== Results ==
=== Preliminaries ===
Qualified for final round

==== Group A ====
Rank	Competitor	MP	W	L	Points	AUT	CHN	FRA
1	Stanisław Frączyk (AUT)	2	1	1	5:3	x	3:0	2:3
2	Lu Xiaolei (CHN)	2	1	1	3:3	0:3	x	3:0
3	Olivier Chateigner (FRA)	2	1	1	3:5	3:2	0:3	x

==== Group B ====
Rank	Competitor	MP	W	L	Points	HUN	NED	SWE
1	Gyula Zborai (HUN)	2	2	0	6:0	x	3:0	3:0
2	Tonnie Heijnen (NED)	2	1	1	3:4	0:3	x	3:1
3	Magnus Andree (SWE)	2	0	2	1:6	0:3	1:3	x

==== Group C ====
Rank	Competitor	MP	W	L	Points	TPE	FRA	AUT	CZE
1	Hsu Chih Shan (TPE)	3	3	0	9:4	x	3:1	3:1	3:2
2	Francois Serignat (FRA)	3	2	1	7:3	1:3	x	3:0	3:0
3	Rene Gutdeutsch (AUT)	3	1	2	4:8	1:3	0:3	x	3:2
4	Miroslav Cinibulk (CZE)	3	0	3	4:9	2:3	0:3	2:3	x

==== Group D ====
Rank	Competitor	MP	W	L	Points	JPN	USA	IRI	CRO
1	Shigekazu Tomioka (JPN)	3	3	0	9:0	x	3:0	3:0	3:0
2	Tahl Leibovitz (USA)	3	2	1	6:4	0:3	x	3:0	3:1
3	Behnam Rahbari (IRI)	3	1	2	3:8	0:3	0:3	x	3:2
4	Dragan Rakic (CRO)	3	0	3	3:9	0:3	1:3	2:3	x

==== Group E ====
Rank	Competitor	MP	W	L	Points	CZE	NED	IRI	CRO
1	Jaroslav Cieslar (CZE)	3	3	0	9:2	x	3:2	3:0	3:0
2	Gerben Last (NED)	3	2	1	8:3	2:3	x	3:0	3:0
3	Abbas Alimardani (IRI)	3	1	2	3:7	0:3	0:3	x	3:1
4	Emil Gubica (CRO)	3	0	3	1:9	0:3	0:3	1:3	x

=== Competition bracket ===
Round of 16
Gerben Last (NED)	1
Tahl Leibovitz (USA)	3
Lu Xiaolei (CHN)	3
Jaroslav Cieslar (CZE)	1

Quarterfinals
Stanisław Frączyk (AUT)	3
Tonnie Heijnen (NED)	1
Tahl Leibovitz (USA)	3
Hsu Chih Shan (TPE)	0
Shigekazu Tomioka (JPN)	1
Lu Xiaolei (CHN)	3
Francois Serignat (FRA)	1
Gyula Zborai (HUN)	3

Semifinals
Stanisław Frączyk (AUT)	3
Tahl Leibovitz (USA)	0
Lu Xiaolei (CHN)	3
Gyula Zborai (HUN)	1

Final
Stanisław Frączyk (AUT)	3
Lu Xiaolei (CHN)	0
Third place
Tahl Leibovitz (USA)	3
Gyula Zborai (HUN)	0
