= Table tennis at the 2004 Summer Paralympics – Men's individual – Class 10 =

Patrick Ringel; Maria Tsipou; Cindy Leung; Aly Salam. "Pararalympic Games Athens 2004: Report from the Referees" (PDF). International Table Tennis Federation.

The Men's Singles 10 table tennis competition at the 2004 Summer Paralympics was held from 18 to 21 September at the Galatsi Olympic Hall.

Classes 6–10 were for athletes with a physical impairment who competed from a standing position; the lower the number, the greater the impact the impairment had on an athlete’s ability to compete.

The event was won by Ladislav Gaspar, representing Slovakia.

== Results ==
=== Preliminaries ===
Qualified for final round

==== Group A ====
Rank	Competitor	MP	W	L	Points	ISR	ESP	CZE
1	David Altaratz (ISR)	2	1	1	4:3	x	3:0	1:3
2	Enrique Agudo (ESP)	2	1	1	3:3	0:3	x	W/O
3	Ivan Karabec (CZE)	2	1	1	3:4	3:1	DQA	x

DQA: Disqualified for excessive use of prohibited solvents on rackets

==== Group B ====
Rank	Competitor	MP	W	L	Points	CHN	ESP	HUN
1	Ge Yang (CHN)	2	2	0	6:2	x	3:2	3:0
2	Jose Manuel Ruiz (ESP)	2	1	1	5:3	2:3	x	3:0
3	Dezso Bereczki (HUN)	2	0	2	0:6	0:3	0:3	x

==== Group C ====
Rank	Competitor	MP	W	L	Points	FRA	CZE	MEX	JOR
1	Gilles de la Bourdonnaye (FRA)	3	3	0	9:0	x	3:0	3:0	3:0
2	Tomas Vrbka (CZE)	3	2	1	6:3	0:3	x	3:0	3:0
3	Jose Luis Vivanco (MEX)	3	1	2	3:6	0:3	0:3	x	3:0
4	Imad Ibrahim Khalil (JOR)	3	0	3	0:9	0:3	0:3	0:3	x

==== Group D ====
Rank	Competitor	MP	W	L	Points	SVK	SWE	ITA	HUN
1	Ladislav Gaspar (SVK)	3	3	0	9:1	x	3:1	3:0	3:0
2	Fredrik Andersson (SWE)	3	2	1	7:3	1:3	x	3:0	3:0
3	Paolo Pietro Puglisi (ITA)	3	1	2	3:7	0:3	0:3	x	3:1
4	Zsolt Bereczki (HUN)	3	0	3	1:9	0:3	0:3	1:3	x

=== Competition bracket ===
Quarterfinals
David Altaratz (ISR)	0
Jose Manuel Ruiz (ESP)	3
Fredrik Andersson (SWE)	3
Gilles de la Bourdonnaye (FRA)	1
Ladislav Gaspar (SVK)	3
Tomas Vrbka (CZE)	0
Enrique Agudo (ESP)	1
Ge Yang (CHN)	3

Semifinals
Jose Manuel Ruiz (ESP)	2
Fredrik Andersson (SWE)	3
Ladislav Gaspar (SVK)	3
Ge Yang (CHN)	0

Finals
Fredrik Andersson (SWE)	1
Ladislav Gaspar (SVK)	3
Third place
Jose Manuel Ruiz (ESP)	2
Ge Yang (CHN)	3
