= Table tennis at the 2016 Summer Paralympics – Men's individual – Class 10 =

Table tennis at the XV Paralympic Games
- Venue: Riocentro Pavilion 3
- Dates: 8–12 September 2016
- Competitors: 15 from 13 nations

Medalists
1st place, gold medalist(s)		Ge Yang	China
2nd place, silver medalist(s)		Patryk Chojnowski	Poland
3rd place, bronze medalist(s)		Krisztian Gardos	Austria

The men's individual table tennis – Class 10 tournament at the 2016 Summer Paralympics in Rio de Janeiro took place during 8–12 September 2016 at Riocentro Pavilion 3. Classes 6–10 were for athletes with a physical impairment who competed from a standing position; the lower the number, the greater the impact the impairment was on an athlete's ability to compete.

In the preliminary stage, athletes competed in five groups of three. Winners and runners-up of each group qualified to the quarterfinals.

== Results ==
All times are local time in UTC-3.

=== Main bracket ===
==== Final rounds ====
Semi-finals
Patryk Chojnowski (POL)	11	11	11
Krisztian Gardos (AUT)	6	3	7
Ge Yang (CHN)	11	10	11	6	11
Lian Hao (CHN)	9	12	8	11	8

Final
Patryk Chojnowski (POL)	11	8	11	8	14
Ge Yang (CHN)	5	11	8	11	16
Bronze medal match
Krisztian Gardos (AUT)	11	11	11
Lian Hao (CHN)	9	7	4

==== Top half ====
Round of 16						Quarter-finals							Semi-finals
						A1	Patryk Chojnowski (POL)	10	11	14	11
Mateo Boheas (FRA)	13	11	7	10	11		Mateo Boheas (FRA)	12	8	12	4
David Jacobs (INA)	11	9	11	12	5								Patryk Chojnowski (POL)	11	11	11
													Krisztian Gardos (AUT)	6	3	7
						Denislav Kodjabashev (BUL)		11	8	2	11	12
						Krisztian Gardos (AUT)		5	11	11	7	14

==== Bottom half ====
Round of 16					Quarter-finals						Semi-finals
					Ge Yang (CHN)		11	11	11
					Jorge Cardona (ESP)		5	9	9
											Ge Yang (CHN)	11	10	11	6	11
Lian Hao (CHN)	8	11	11	11							Lian Hao (CHN)	9	12	8	11	8
Jose Manuel Ruiz Reyes (ESP)	11	8	5	8		Lian Hao (CHN)	13	5	11	11
					B1	Kim Daybell (GBR)	11	11	9	8

=== Preliminary round ===
Qualified for the knock-out round

==== Group A ====
Rank	Athlete	Won	Lost	Points diff
1 Q	Patryk Chojnowski (POL)	2	0	+23
2 Q	Jorge Cardona (ESP)	1	1	0
3	Ivan Karabec (CZE)	0	2	-23

Patryk Chojnowski (POL)	11	15	11
Jorge Cardona (ESP)	3	13	3

Patryk Chojnowski (POL)	12	11	4	11
Ivan Karabec (CZE)	10	7	11	5

Ivan Karabec (CZE)	3	7	5
Jorge Cardona (ESP)	11	11	11

==== Group B ====
Rank	Athlete	Won	Lost	Points diff
1 Q	Kim Daybell (GBR)	2	0	+5
2 Q	David Jacobs (INA)	1	1	+20
3	Bas Hergelink (NED)	0	2	–25

David Jacobs (INA)	11	11	11
Bas Hergelink (NED)	4	3	6

David Jacobs (INA)	7	11	12	11	12
Kim Daybell (GBR)	11	9	14	5	14

Kim Daybell (GBR)	4	11	11	11	11
Bas Hergelink (NED)	11	8	6	13	5

==== Group C ====
Rank	Athlete	Won	Lost	Points diff
1 Q	Ge Yang (CHN)	2	0	+22
1 Q	Mateo Boheas (FRA)	1	1	–5
3	Mohamad Azwar Bakar (MAS)	0	2	-17

Mateo Boheas (FRA)	11	5	11	14
Mohamad Azwar Bakar (MAS)	4	11	9	12

Mateo Boheas (FRA)	7	9	7
Ge Yang (CHN)	11	11	11

Ge Yang (CHN)	11	11	11
Mohamad Azwar Bakar (MAS)	9	7	5

==== Group D ====
Rank	Athlete	Won	Lost	Points diff
1 Q	Krisztian Gardos (AUT)	2	0	+15
2 Q	Jose Manuel Ruiz Reyes (ESP)	1	1	+2
3	Carlos Carbinatti (BRA)	0	2	–17

Jose Manuel Ruiz Reyes (ESP)	12	11	11
Carlos Carbinatti (BRA)	10	9	7

Jose Manuel Ruiz Reyes (ESP)	8	12	8	11
Krisztian Gardos (AUT)	11	10	11	13

Krisztian Gardos (AUT)	9	11	11	9	11
Carlos Carbinatti (BRA)	11	7	4	11	9

==== Group E ====
Rank	Athlete	Won	Lost	Points diff
1 Q	Denislav Kodjabashev (BUL)	2	0	+34
2 Q	Lian Hao (CHN)	1	1	+8
3	Abdelrahman Ahmed (EGY)	0	2	-42

Lian Hao (CHN)	11	11	11
Abdelrahman Ahmed (EGY)	4	8	2

Lian Hao (CHN)	10	12	5	6
Denislav Kodjabashev (BUL)	12	10	11	11

Denislav Kodjabashev (BUL)	11	11	11
Abdelrahman Ahmed (EGY)	4	1	5
