= Table tennis at the 2022 Commonwealth Games – Men's singles C8–10 =

Table tennis – Men's singles C3–5 at the 2022 Commonwealth Games
- Venue: National Exhibition Centre
- Dates: 3 - 6 August 2022
- Competitors: 8 from 7 nations

Medalists
gold medal	Joshua Stacey	Wales
silver medal	Ma Lin	Australia
bronze medal	Ross Wilson	England

Table tennis men's singles C8–10 at the 2022 Commonwealth Games is held at the National Exhibition Centre at Birmingham, England from 3 to 6 August 2022.

== Finals ==
Semifinals
Ma Lin (AUS)	11	11	11
Tajudeen Agunbiade (NGR)	9	7	6
Ross Wilson (ENG)	11	6	11	7
Joshua Stacey (WAL)	1	11	13	11

Gold medal match
Ma Lin (AUS)	23	11	11	6	5
Joshua Stacey (WAL)	25	5	9	11	11
Bronze medal match
Tajudeen Agunbiade (NGR)	9	11	4	17	6
Ross Wilson (ENG)	11	9	11	15	11

== Group stage ==
=== Group 1 ===
Name	Pld	MW	ML	GW	GL	Pts
Ma Lin (AUS)	3	3	0	9	0	6
Ross Wilson (ENG)	3	2	1	6	3	5
Asad Hussain Syed (CAN)	3	1	2	3	6	4
Alabi Olabiyi Olufemi (NGR)	3	0	3	0	9	0

Date	Time	Player 1	Score	Player 2	Set 1	Set 2	Set 3	Set 4	Set 5
3 August	12:25	Ross Wilson (ENG)	3–0	Alabi Olabiyi Olufemi (NGR)	w/o				
3 August	12:25	Ma Lin (AUS)	3–0	Asad Hussain Syed (CAN)	11–4	11–5	11–8		
3 August	19:30	Ross Wilson (ENG)	0–3	Ma Lin (AUS)'	7–11	11–13	11–13		
3 August	19:30	Alabi Olabiyi Olufemi (NGR)	0–3	Asad Hussain Syed (CAN)	w/o				
4 August	12:25	Ross Wilson (ENG)	3–0	Asad Hussain Syed (CAN)	11–3	11–7	11–8		
4 August	12:25	Ma Lin (AUS)	3–0	Alabi Olabiyi Olufemi (NGR)	w/o				

=== Group 2 ===
Name	Pld	MW	ML	GW	GL	Pts
Joshua Stacey (WAL)	3	3	0	9	2	6
Tajudeen Agunbiade (NGR)	3	2	1	7	4	5
Chee Chaoming (MAS)	3	1	2	5	6	4
Panteleimon Kailis (CYP)	3	0	3	0	9	3

Date	Time	Player 1	Score	Player 2	Set 1	Set 2	Set 3	Set 4	Set 5
3 August	12:25	Joshua Stacey (WAL)	3–1	Chee Chaoming (MAS)	11–8	11–7	9–11	11–4	
3 August	12:25	Tajudeen Agunbiade (NGR)	3–0	Panteleimon Kailis (CYP)	11–2	11–5	11–6		
3 August	19:30	Joshua Stacey (WAL)	3–1	Tajudeen Agunbiade (NGR)	15–17	11–6	11–2	11–8	
3 August	19:30	Chee Chaoming (MAS)	3–0	Panteleimon Kailis (CYP)	11–7	11–3	11–4		
4 August	13:00	Joshua Stacey (WAL)	3–0	Panteleimon Kailis (CYP)	11–3	11–1	11–5		
4 August	13:00	Tajudeen Agunbiade (NGR)	3–1	Chee Chaoming (MAS)	11–11	8–11	12–10	11–6	
