= Patryk Chojnowski =

Polish para table tennis player (born 1990)

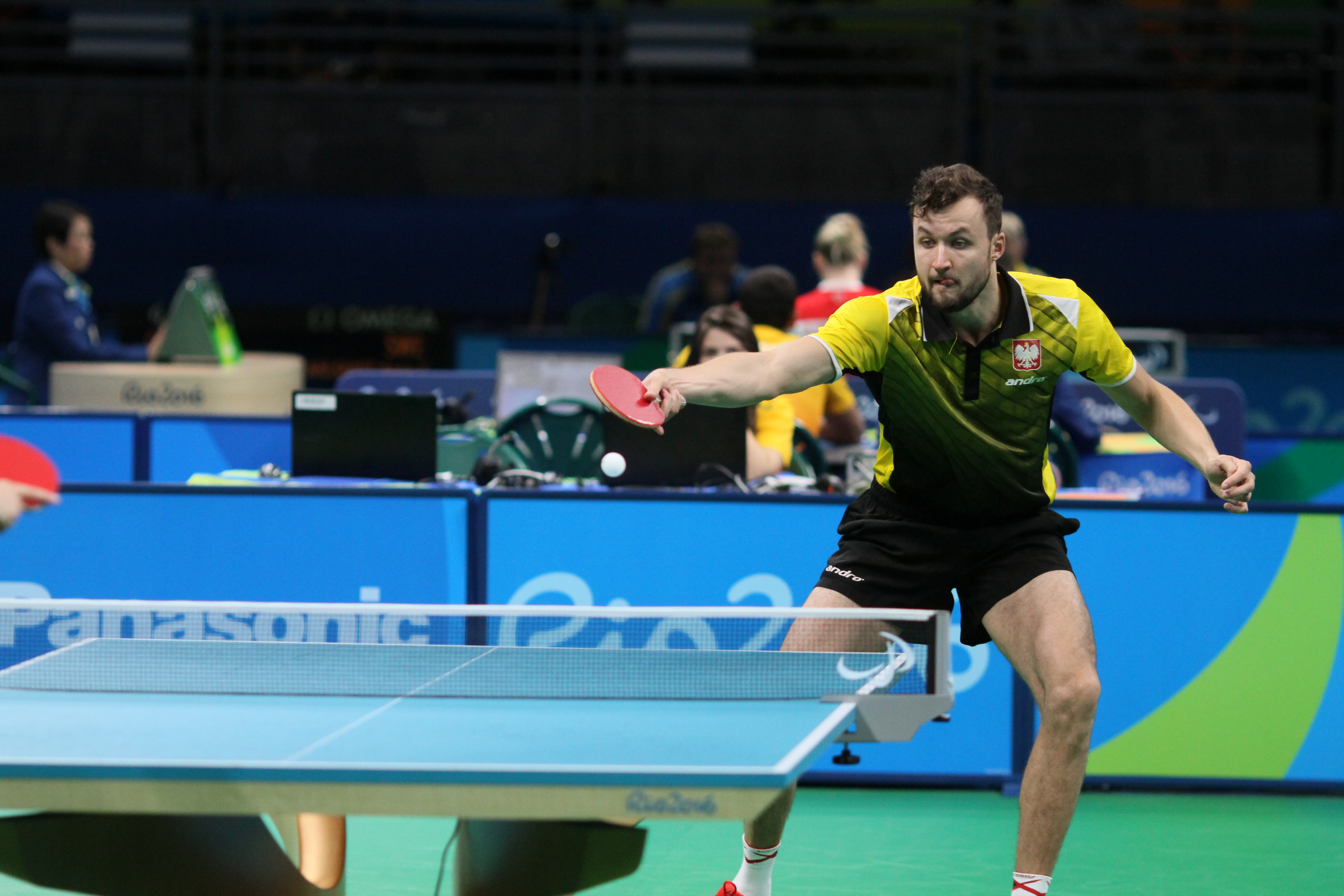
- CHOJNOWSKI Patryk

Personal information
- Nickname: Chojno
- Born: 5 April 1990 (age 36) Swidnik, Poland
- Height: 196 cm (6 ft 5 in)
- Weight: 90 kg (198 lb)

Sport
- Country: Poland
- Sport: Para table tennis
- Disability: Motor impairment
- Disability class: C10
- Club: Dekorglass Dzialdowo
- Coached by: Longin Wrobel
Medal record
Para table tennis
Representing Poland
Paralympic Games
Gold medal – first place	2012 London	Men's singles C10
Gold medal – first place	2020 Tokyo	Men's singles C10
Gold medal – first place	2024 Paris	Men's singles C10
Gold medal – first place	2024 Paris	Men's doubles MD18
Silver medal – second place	2012 London	Men's team C9-10
Silver medal – second place	2016 Rio de Janeiro	Men's singles C10
Bronze medal – third place	2016 Rio de Janeiro	Men's team C10
World Championships
Gold medal – first place	2014 Beijing	Men's singles C10
Gold medal – first place	2014 Beijing	Men's teams C9-10
Gold medal – first place	2018 Lasko	Men's singles C10
World Team Championships
Gold medal – first place	2017 Bratislava	Men's teams C10
European Championships
Gold medal – first place	2011 Split	Men's singles C10
Gold medal – first place	2011 Split	Men's teams C10
Gold medal – first place	2013 Lignano	Men's singles C10
Gold medal – first place	2013 Lignano	Men's teams C10
Gold medal – first place	2015 Vejle	Men's singles C10
Gold medal – first place	2015 Vejle	Men's teams C10
Gold medal – first place	2017 Lasko	Men's singles C10
Gold medal – first place	2017 Lasko	Men's teams C10

Patryk Chojnowski (born 5 April 1990) is a para table tennis player who competes for Poland. He is a Paralympic champion, four-time World champion and eight-time European champion.

== See also ==
- Natalia Partyka
