= Ma Lin (Paralympian) =

Chinese-Australian para table tennis player

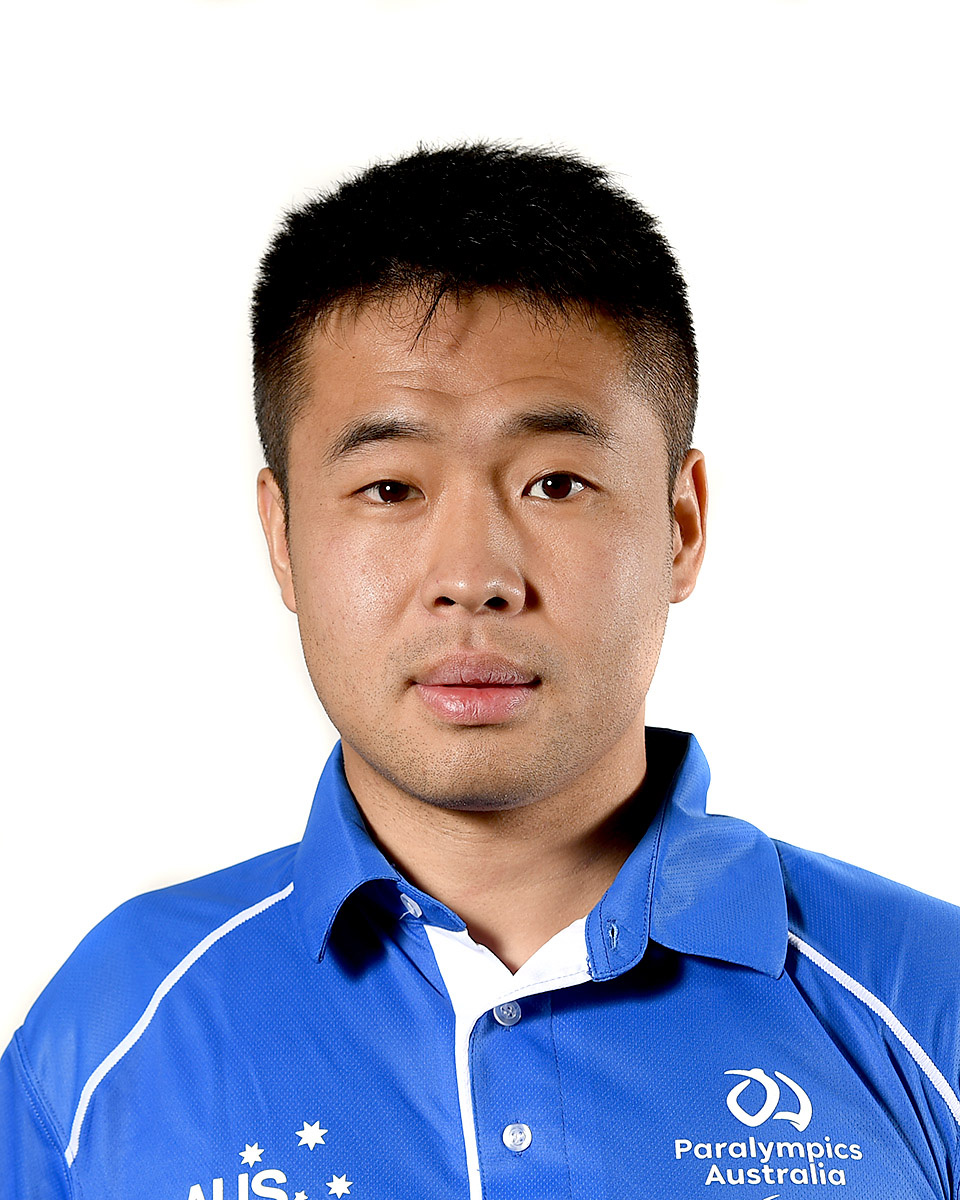
- Ma Lin in 2019

Personal information
- Born: 25 December 1989 (age 36) Mudanjiang, Heilongjiang, China
- Height: 173 cm (5 ft 8 in)
- Weight: 80 kg (176 lb)

Sport
- Sport: Table tennis
- Playing style: Left-handed shakehand grip
- Disability class: 9
- Highest ranking: 1 (April 2007)
- Current ranking: 6 (February 2020)
Medal record
Men's para table tennis
Representing Australia
Paralympic Games
| Silver medal – second place | 2020 Tokyo | Singles C9–10 |
| Silver medal – second place | 2020 Tokyo | Team C9–10 |
| Bronze medal – third place | 2024 Paris | Singles C9 |
Commonwealth Games
| Silver medal – second place | 2022 Birmingham | Singles C8-10 |
Representing China
Paralympic Games
| Gold medal – first place | 2008 Beijing | Teams C9–10 |
| Gold medal – first place | 2012 London | Singles C9 |
| Gold medal – first place | 2012 London | Teams C9–10 |
| Gold medal – first place | 2016 Rio de Janeiro | Teams C9–10 |
| Silver medal – second place | 2008 Beijing | Singles C9–10 |
World Championships
| Gold medal – first place | 2006 Montreux | Singles C9 |
| Gold medal – first place | 2006 Montreux | Teams C9 |
| Gold medal – first place | 2010 Gwangju | Singles C9 |
| Gold medal – first place | 2010 Gwangju | Teams C9–10 |
| Gold medal – first place | 2014 Beijing | Singles C9 |
| Silver medal – second place | 2010 Gwangju | Open singles standing |
| Silver medal – second place | 2014 Beijing | Teams C9–10 |
| Bronze medal – third place | 2022 Andalucia | Singles C9 |
| Silver medal – second place | 2022 Andalucia | Mixed Doubles 20 |
Asian Para Games
| Gold medal – first place | 2010 Guangzhou | Singles C9 |
| Gold medal – first place | 2010 Guangzhou | Teams C9–10 |
| Gold medal – first place | 2014 Incheon | Singles C9 |
| Gold medal – first place | 2014 Incheon | Teams C9–10 |
FESPIC Games
| Gold medal – first place | 2006 Kuala Lumpur | Singles C9 |
| Gold medal – first place | 2006 Kuala Lumpur | Teams C9 |
| Silver medal – second place | 2006 Kuala Lumpur | Open singles standing |
Asian Championships
| Gold medal – first place | 2005 Kuala Lumpur | Singles C9 |
| Gold medal – first place | 2005 Kuala Lumpur | Teams C9 |
| Gold medal – first place | 2007 Seoul | Teams C9 |
| Gold medal – first place | 2009 Amman | Teams C9 |
| Gold medal – first place | 2009 Amman | Open singles standing |
| Gold medal – first place | 2011 Hong Kong | Singles C9 |
| Gold medal – first place | 2011 Hong Kong | Teams C9 |
| Gold medal – first place | 2013 Beijing | Singles C9 |
| Gold medal – first place | 2013 Beijing | Teams C9 |
| Gold medal – first place | 2015 Amman | Singles C9 |
| Gold medal – first place | 2015 Amman | Teams C9 |
| Silver medal – second place | 2007 Seoul | Singles C9–10 |
| Silver medal – second place | 2007 Seoul | Open singles standing |
| Bronze medal – third place | 2009 Amman | Singles C9 |
FESPIC Championships
| Gold medal – first place | 2003 Shanghai | Open singles standing |
| Gold medal – first place | 2003 Shanghai | Teams C9 |

Ma Lin
- Traditional Chinese: 馬麟
- Simplified Chinese: 马麟
Transcriptions
Standard Mandarin
- Hanyu Pinyin: Mǎ Lín

Ma Lin (Chinese: 马麟, born 25 December 1989) is a Chinese-Australian table tennis player who has only a left arm. He has won four gold, three silver and one bronze Paralympic medals in representing China and Australia over five games. He competed for Australia at the 2020 Tokyo Paralympics and the 2024 Paris Paralympics.

== Biography ==
Ma lost his right arm at age 5, after he went to the zoo with other children and stuck his arm in a cage to feed a bear. He sustained a knee injury in the 2014 World Para Table Tennis Championships in Beijing. Ma moved to Melbourne, Australia in 2017.

== Table Tennis ==
He was named the 2013 Male Para-Table Tennis Star during the ITTF Star Awards in January 2014.

He also registered with Table Tennis Australia, and competed in the Australian Open during the 2019 ITTF World Tour (with able-bodied athletes), losing his only match 0–4 to Thailand's Supanut Wisutmaythangkoon.

He represented Australia at the 2020 Tokyo Paralympics, where he won silver medals in Men's Singles C9-10 and Men's Team C9-10 with Nathan Pellissier and Joel Coughlan.

At the 2022 Commonwealth Games, he won the silver medal in the Men's singles C8–10.

He competed at the 2024 Paris Paralympics in the Men's Singles 9 and Men's Doubles 18. He won the bronze medal in the Men's Singles 9 after being defeated by Lucas Didier in the semi-final.
