= Ge Yang =

Chinese para table tennis player

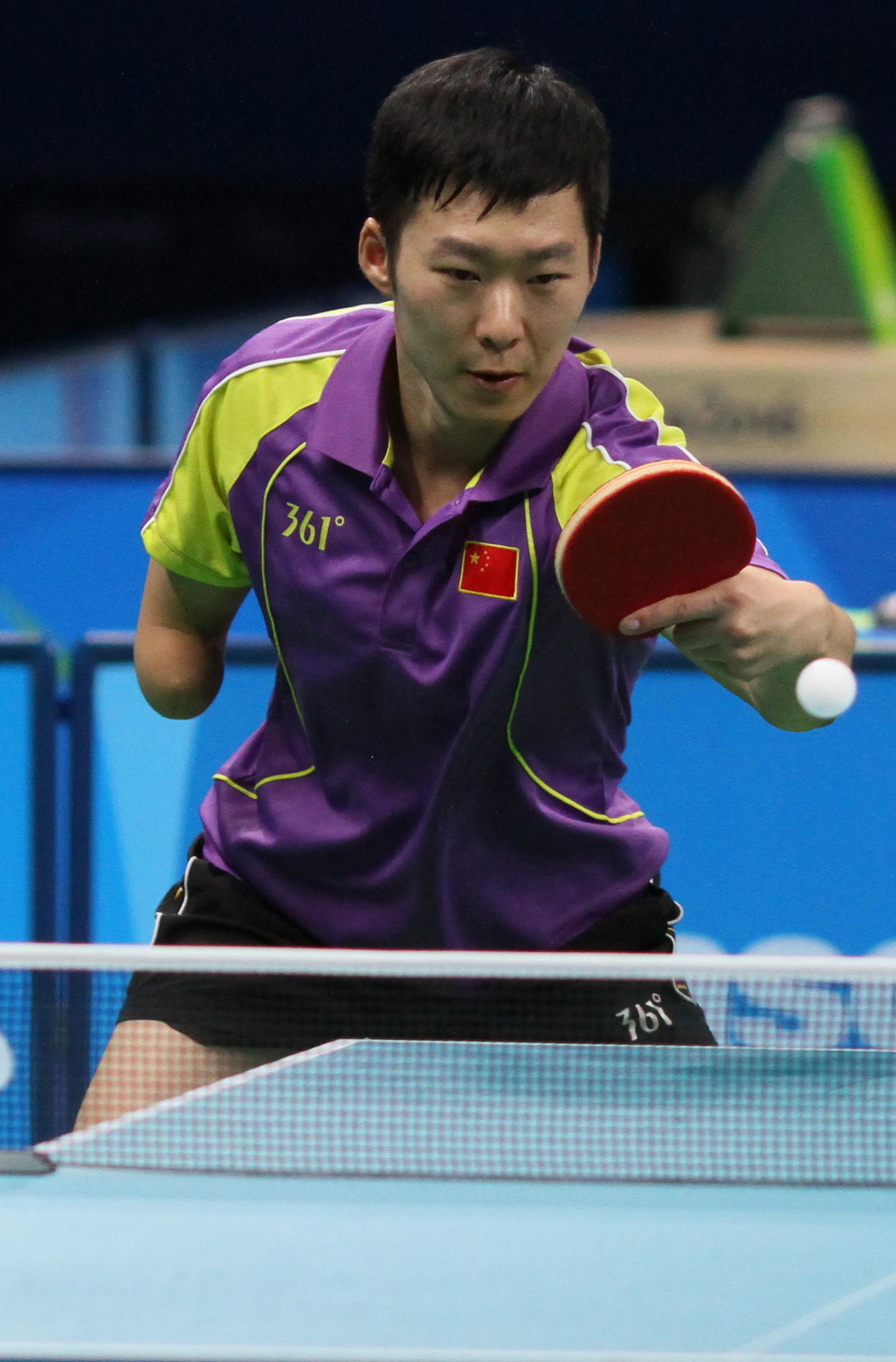
- Ge at the 2016 Summer Paralympics

Personal information
- Born: 26 September 1985 (age 40) Baoding, Hebei, China
- Height: 178 cm (5 ft 10 in)
- Weight: 65 kg (143 lb)

Sport
- Sport: Table tennis
- Playing style: Left-handed shakehand grip
- Disability class: 10
- Highest ranking: 1 (July 2005)
Medal record
Men's para table tennis
Representing China
Paralympic Games
Gold medal – first place	2004 Athens	Teams C10
Gold medal – first place	2008 Beijing	Singles C9–10
Gold medal – first place	2008 Beijing	Teams C9–10
Gold medal – first place	2012 London	Teams C9–10
Gold medal – first place	2016 Rio de Janeiro	Singles C10
Gold medal – first place	2016 Rio de Janeiro	Teams C9–10
Silver medal – second place	2012 London	Singles C10
Bronze medal – third place	2004 Athens	Singles C10
World Championships
Gold medal – first place	2002 Taipei	Teams C10
Gold medal – first place	2006 Montreux	Teams C10
Gold medal – first place	2006 Montreux	Open singles standing
Gold medal – first place	2010 Gwangju	Singles C10
Gold medal – first place	2010 Gwangju	Teams C10
Silver medal – second place	2014 Beijing	Singles C10
Silver medal – second place	2014 Beijing	Teams C9–10
Bronze medal – third place	2006 Montreux	Singles C10
Asian Para Games
Gold medal – first place	2010 Guangzhou	Singles C10
Gold medal – first place	2014 Incheon	Teams C9–10
Bronze medal – third place	2014 Incheon	Singles C10
FESPIC Games
Gold medal – first place	2002 Busan	Open singles standing
Gold medal – first place	2002 Busan	Singles C10
Gold medal – first place	2002 Busan	Teams C10
Gold medal – first place	2006 Kuala Lumpur	Open singles standing
Gold medal – first place	2006 Kuala Lumpur	Singles C10
Gold medal – first place	2006 Kuala Lumpur	Teams C10
Asian Championships
Gold medal – first place	2005 Kuala Lumpur	Open singles standing
Gold medal – first place	2005 Kuala Lumpur	Singles C9–10
Gold medal – first place	2005 Kuala Lumpur	Teams C10
Gold medal – first place	2007 Seoul	Open singles standing
Gold medal – first place	2007 Seoul	Singles C9–10
Gold medal – first place	2007 Seoul	Teams C10
Gold medal – first place	2009 Amman	Singles C10
Gold medal – first place	2009 Amman	Teams C10
Gold medal – first place	2011 Hong Kong	Singles C10
Gold medal – first place	2011 Hong Kong	Teams C10
Gold medal – first place	2013 Beijing	Singles C10
Gold medal – first place	2013 Beijing	Teams C10
Gold medal – first place	2015 Amman	Teams C10
Silver medal – second place	2015 Amman	Singles C10
FESPIC Championships
Gold medal – first place	2001 Osaka	Singles C10
Gold medal – first place	2001 Osaka	Open singles standing
Gold medal – first place	2001 Osaka	Teams C10
Gold medal – first place	2003 Shanghai	Singles C10

Ge Yang
- Traditional Chinese: 葛楊
- Simplified Chinese: 葛杨
Transcriptions
Standard Mandarin
- Hanyu Pinyin: Gě Yáng

Ge Yang (Chinese: 葛杨, born 26 September 1985) is a retired Chinese para table tennis player. Ge has played para table tennis since he was seven years old. He made his debut at the Paralympics in Athens in 2004 aged 20 and has competed in four Paralympic Games, winning six gold medals, one silver and one bronze.

Ge lost his lower right arm in a fireworks accident at age five.
