= Ladislav Gáspár =

Slovak para table tennis player

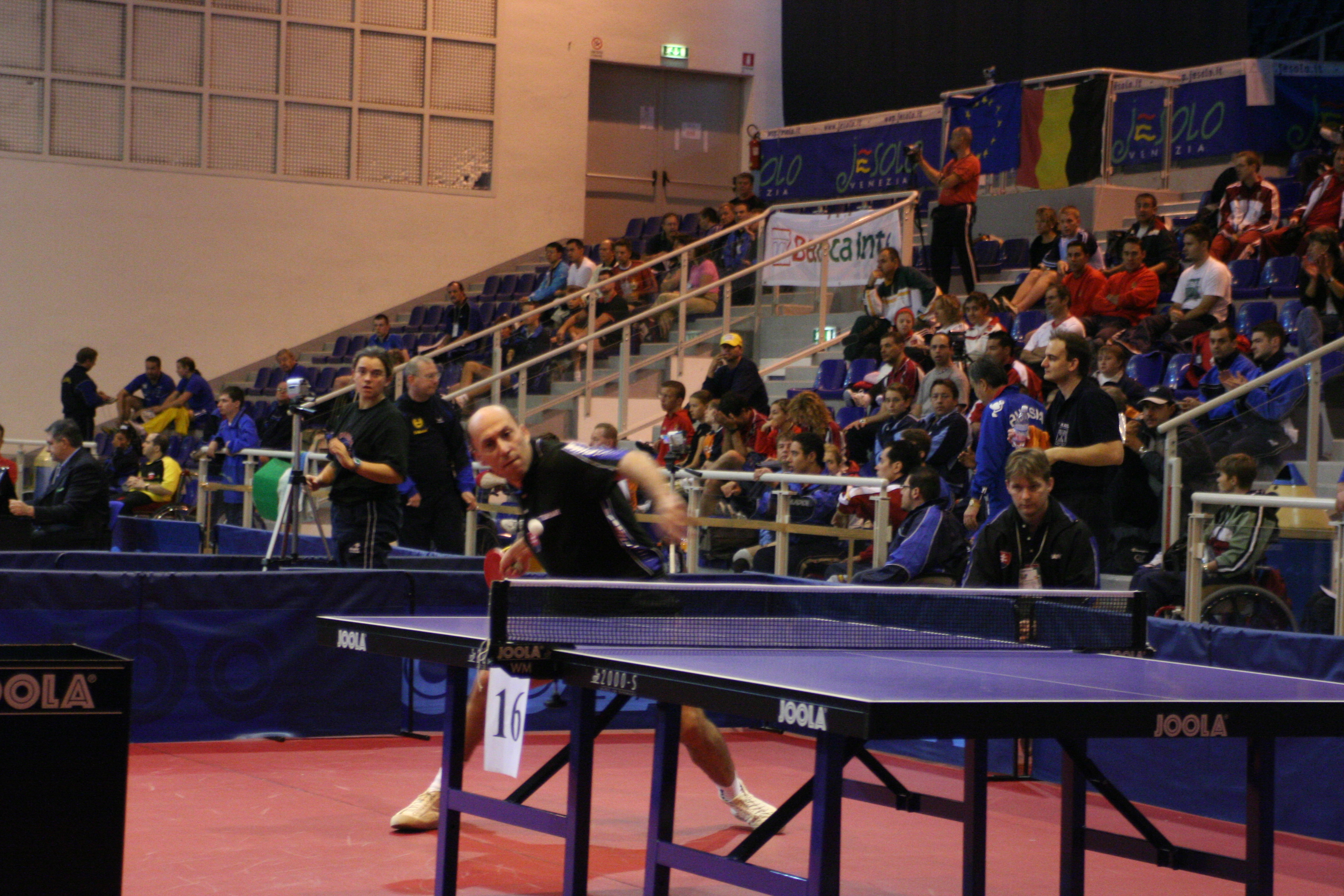
- paralympian of the decade, 2005

Personal information
- Born: 4 July 1970 (age 55) Slovakia

Sport
- Country: Slovakia
- Sport: Para table tennis
- Disability: Disability
- Disability class: C10
- Retired: 2010
Medal record
Para table tennis
Representing Slovakia
Paralympic Games
Gold medal – first place	2004 Athens	Men's singles C10
Silver medal – second place	1996 Atlanta	Men's open singles
Silver medal – second place	2000 Sydney	Men's teams C9
Bronze medal – third place	1996 Atlanta	Men's singles C9
Bronze medal – third place	1996 Atlanta	Men's teams C9-10
World Championships
Gold medal – first place	2002 Taipei	Men's teams C9
Silver medal – second place	1998 Paris	Men's singles C9
Silver medal – second place	2006 Montreux	Men's singles C10
Bronze medal – third place	1998 Paris	Men's open singles
Bronze medal – third place	1998 Paris	Men's teams C9
Bronze medal – third place	2002 Taipei	Men's singles C9
European Championships
Gold medal – first place	1995 Hillerød	Men's singles C9
Gold medal – first place	1999 Piešťany	Men's teams C9
Silver medal – second place	1995 Hillerød	Men's teams C10
Silver medal – second place	1997 Stockholm	Men's singles C9
Silver medal – second place	1997 Stockholm	Men's open singles
Silver medal – second place	1999 Piešťany	Men's singles C9
Silver medal – second place	2001 Frankfurt	Men's singles C9
Silver medal – second place	2001 Frankfurt	Men's teams C9

Ladislav Gáspár (born 4 July 1970) is a Slovak former para table tennis player.
