= Gilles de la Bourdonnaye =

French para table tennis player

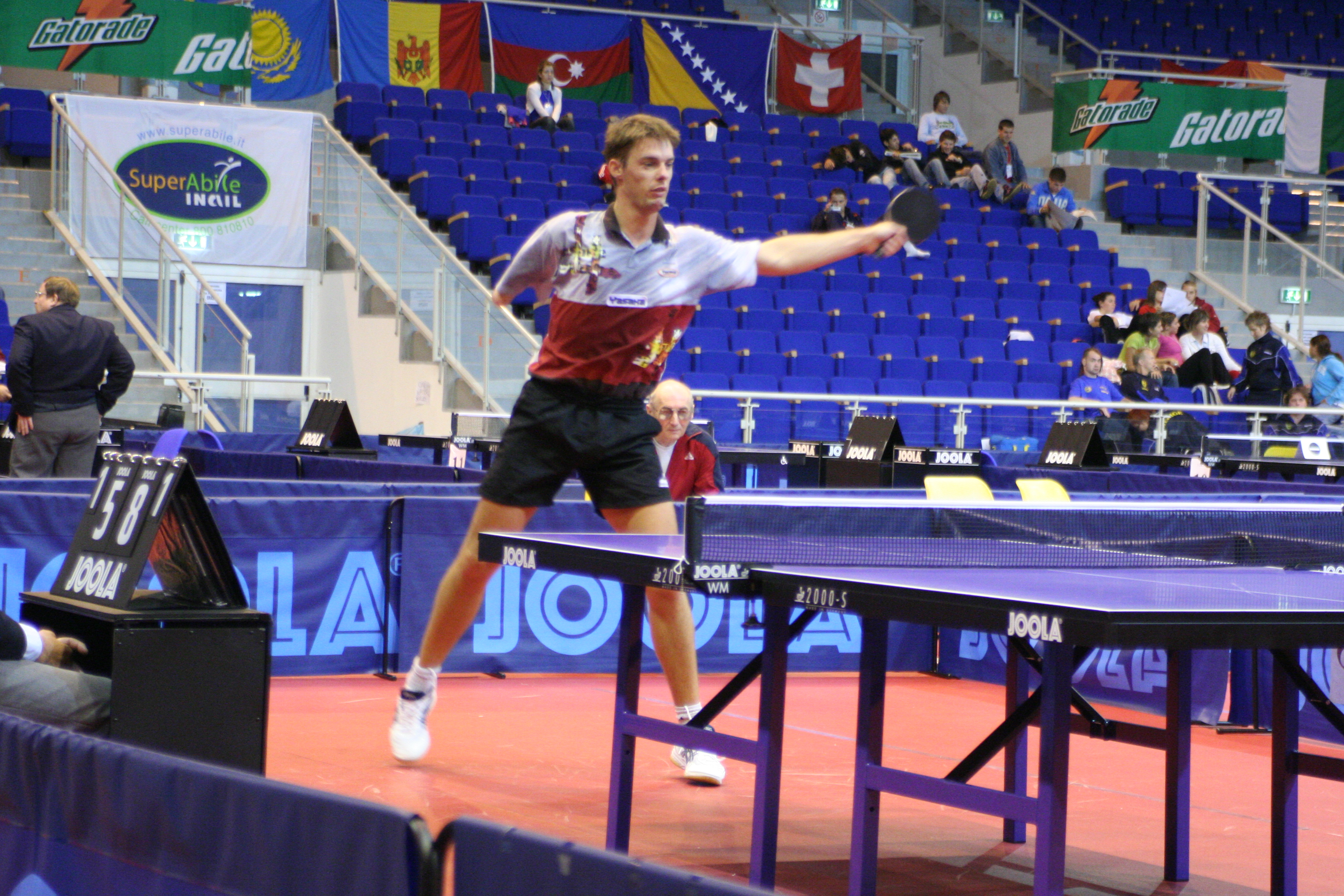
- de la Bourdonnaye at 2005 European Championships

Personal information
- Nationality: French
- Born: 27 January 1973 (age 53) Dakar, Senegal
- Spouse: Micha Zakova-de la Bourdonnaye

Sport
- Country: France
- Sport: Para table tennis
- Disability: Amputation of right arm
- Disability class: C10
- Coached by: Grégory Rosec
Medal record
Para table tennis
Representing France
Paralympic Games
Gold medal – first place	1996 Atlanta	Men's singles C10
Gold medal – first place	1996 Atlanta	Men's teams C9-10
Gold medal – first place	2000 Sydney	Men's teams C10
Silver medal – second place	1992 Barcelona	Men's singles C10
Silver medal – second place	1992 Barcelona	Men's teams C10
Silver medal – second place	2004 Athens	Men's teams C10
Bronze medal – third place	1992 Barcelona	Men's open singles
Bronze medal – third place	1996 Atlanta	Men's open singles
Bronze medal – third place	2008 Beijing	Men's teams C9-10
World Championships
Gold medal – first place	1990 Assen	Men's teams C10
Gold medal – first place	1998 Paris	Men's open singles
Gold medal – first place	2002 Taipei	Men's singles C10
Silver medal – second place	1998 Paris	Men's singles C10
Bronze medal – third place	1990 Assen	Men's singles C10
Bronze medal – third place	1998 Paris	Men's teams C10
Bronze medal – third place	2002 Taipei	Men's teams C10
Bronze medal – third place	2006 Montreux	Men's teams C10
European Championships
Gold medal – first place	1991 Salou	Men's open singles
Gold medal – first place	1995 Hillerød	Men's open singles
Gold medal – first place	1995 Hillerød	Men's singles C10
Gold medal – first place	1995 Hillerød	Men's teams C10
Gold medal – first place	1997 Stockholm	Men's open singles
Gold medal – first place	1997 Stockholm	Men's singles C10
Gold medal – first place	1999 Piešťany	Men's singles C10
Gold medal – first place	1999 Piešťany	Men's teams C10
Gold medal – first place	2001 Frankfurt	Men's teams C10
Gold medal – first place	2003 Zagreb	Men's open singles
Gold medal – first place	2005 Jesolo	Men's open singles
Gold medal – first place	2005 Jesolo	Men's singles C10
Gold medal – first place	2005 Jesolo	Men's teams C10
Silver medal – second place	1991 Salou	Men's teams C10
Silver medal – second place	1997 Stockholm	Men's teams C10
Silver medal – second place	2001 Frankfurt	Men's singles C10
Silver medal – second place	2003 Zagreb	Men's singles C10
Silver medal – second place	2003 Zagreb	Men's teams C10
Silver medal – second place	2007 Kranjska Gora	Men's singles C9-10
Silver medal – second place	2019 Helsingborg	Men's teams C10
Bronze medal – third place	1999 Piešťany	Men's doubles C6-10
Bronze medal – third place	1999 Piešťany	Men's open singles
Bronze medal – third place	2001 Frankfurt	Men's open singles

Gilles de la Bourdonnaye (born 27 January 1973) is a French para table tennis player who competes in international level events. He is a triple Paralympic champion, triple World champion and thirteen time European champion. His right arm was amputated when he was three years old after an elevator accident.

== Sporting career ==
He started competing internationally at the 1990 World Para Table Tennis Championships and retired in the 2008 Summer Paralympics. de la Bourdonnaye came out of retirement eleven years later, aged 46, when he participated at the 2019 European Championships in Helsingborg where he won his first medal since 2008 when he won a silver medal in the teams events.

He has won team event titles with numerous other competitors including Philippe Roine, Jeremy Rousseau and Matéo Bohéas.

=== Return to sport ===
de la Bourdonnaye made his decision to come out of retirement and make a bid to compete in his sixth Paralympic Games by hoping to qualify for the 2020 Summer Paralympics.
