= Joshua Stacey =

Welsh para table tennis player (born 2000)

Personal information
- Born: 25 February 2000 (age 26) Cardiff, Great Britain
- Home town: Sheffield, Great Britain

Sport
- Sport: Para table tennis
- Disability: Cerebral palsy
- Disability class: C9
Medal record
Para table tennis
Representing Great Britain
World Championships
Silver medal – second place	2022 Granada	Singles C9
Silver medal – second place	2022 Granada	Doubles C18
European Championships
Bronze medal – third place	2019 Helsingborg	Teams C10
Representing Wales
Commonwealth Games
Gold medal – first place	2022 Birmingham	Singles C8-10
Bronze medal – third place	2018 Gold Coast	Singles C6-10

Joshua Stacey (born 25 February 2000) is a Welsh para table tennis player who competes internationally for Great Britain at table tennis competitions. He is a double World silver medalist, European bronze medalist and a Commonwealth champion. He also took part in the 2020 Summer Paralympics where he reached the quarterfinals in the men's singles C9.
