= Matéo Bohéas =

French Paralympic table tennis player

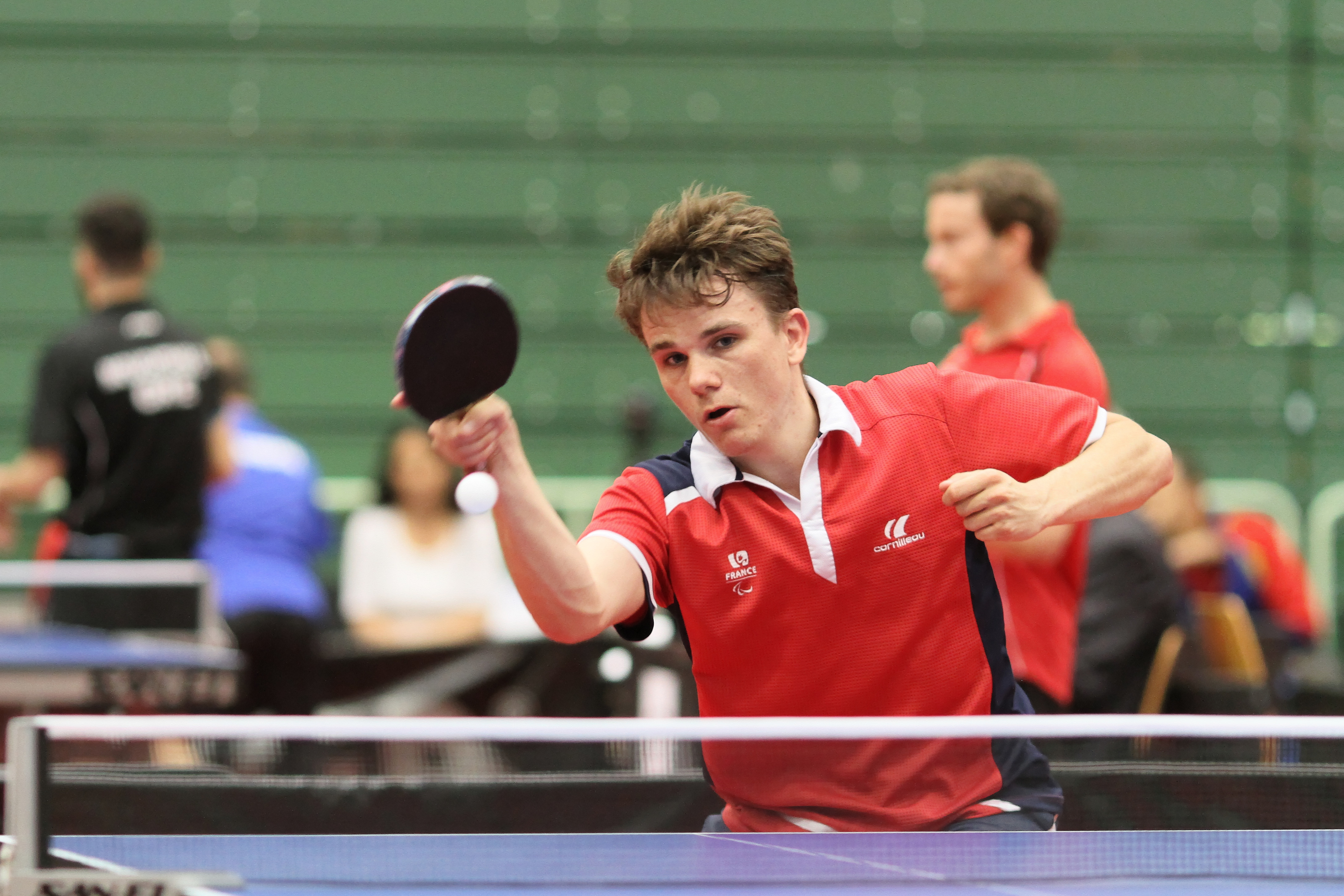
- Bohéas in 2017

Personal information
- Born: 6 October 1996 (age 29) Saint-Sébastien-sur-Loire, France
- Height: 1.74 m (5 ft 9 in)

Sport
- Country: France
- Sport: Para table tennis
- Disability class: C10
Medal record
Para table tennis
Representing France
Paralympic Games
Silver medal – second place	2020 Tokyo	Singles C10
Bronze medal – third place	2024 Paris	Singles C10
World Team Championships
Bronze medal – third place	2017 Bratislava	Teams C10
European Championships
Silver medal – second place	2019 Helsingborg	Teams C10
Bronze medal – third place	2013 Lignano	Teams C10
Bronze medal – third place	2015 Vejle	Teams C10
Bronze medal – third place	2019 Helsingborg	Singles C10

Matéo Bohéas (born 9 October 1996) is a French Paralympic table tennis player. He won silver in the Men's individual class 10 at the 2020 Summer Paralympics in Tokyo.
