= Linus Karlsson (table tennis) =

Swedish Paralympic table tennis player

Personal information
- Born: 4 July 1989 (age 36) Grästorp, Sweden

Sport
- Country: Sweden
- Sport: Para table tennis
- Disability: Klippel–Trénaunay syndrome
- Disability class: C8
Medal record
Para table tennis
Representing Sweden
Paralympic Games
Silver medal – second place	2016 Rio de Janeiro	Men's team C6-8
World Team Championships
Gold medal – first place	2017 Bratislava	Men's teams C8
European Championships
Silver medal – second place	2007 Kranjska Gora	Men's teams C10
Silver medal – second place	2017 Lasko	Men's teams C8
Bronze medal – third place	2009 Genoa	Men's teams C10
Bronze medal – third place	2017 Lasko	Men's singles C8

Linus Karlsson (born 4 July 1989) is a Swedish male para table tennis player competing at singles (class 8) and team events (class 6–8). Karlsson and Emil Andersson won a silver medal at the 2016 Summer Paralympics in Rio de Janeiro, playing against the Ukrainian team at the men's team class 6–8 finals.
