= Tonnie Heijnen =

Dutch para table tennis player

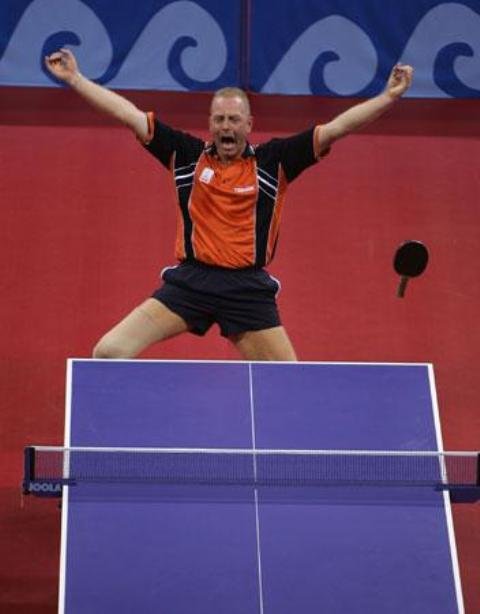
- Heijnen at 2004 Summer Paralympics

Personal information
- Born: 3 June 1967 (age 59) Hoogeveen, Netherlands
- Height: 198 cm (6 ft 6 in)
- Weight: 95 kg (209 lb)

Sport
- Country: Netherlands
- Sport: Para table tennis
- Disability class: C9
Medal record
Para table tennis
Representing Netherlands
Paralympic Games
Gold medal – first place	2004 Athens	Men's teams C9
World Championships
Gold medal – first place	2010 Gwangju	Men's teams C9
European Championships
Gold medal – first place	2007 Kranjska Gora	Men's teams C9
Silver medal – second place	2003 Zagreb	Men's teams C9
Silver medal – second place	2005 Jesolo	Men's teams C9
Silver medal – second place	2009 Genoa	Men's teams C9
Silver medal – second place	2011 Split	Men's teams C9
Silver medal – second place	2013 Lignano	Men's teams C9

Tonnie Heijnen (born 3 June 1967) is a Dutch para table tennis player who competes in international level events. He is a Paralympic champion, World champion and six-time European medalist. He competes in team events alongside Gerben Last.

== Personal life ==
In 2002, Heijnen was involved in a serious car accident while on holiday which resulted in a leg injury. He lost part of his right leg in the accident below his knee.

In 2010, two weeks after winning the World team class 9 title, he collapsed at home with pulmonary embolism, he spent three weeks in hospital and made a full recovery.
