= Tahl Leibovitz =

American para table tennis player

Personal information
- Nationality: American
- Born: June 1, 1975 (age 51) New York City, New York, U.S.
- Home town: Ozone Park, New York, U.S.
- Height: 5 ft 4 in (162 cm)

Sport
- Country: United States
- Sport: Para table tennis
- Disability: Osteochondroma
- Disability class: C7, C9
- Club: South Queens Boys and Girls Club (1995-)
- Coached by: Chris Lehman; Ahmed El-Malah; Mitchell Seidenfeld; Sean O'Neill
Medal record
Para table tennis
Representing United States
Paralympic Games
| Gold medal – first place | 1996 Atlanta | Men's singles C7 |
| Bronze medal – third place | 1996 Atlanta | Men's teams C6-8 |
| Bronze medal – third place | 2004 Athens | Men's singles C7 |
World Championships
| Bronze medal – third place | 1998 Paris | Men's teams C10 |
Parapan American Games
| Gold medal – first place | 2007 Rio de Janeiro | Men's singles C8 |
| Gold medal – first place | 2007 Rio de Janeiro | Open singles standing |
| Gold medal – first place | 2007 Rio de Janeiro | Men's teams C8 |
| Gold medal – first place | 2011 Guadalajara | Men's singles C9 |
| Gold medal – first place | 2015 Toronto | Men's singles C9 |
| Gold medal – first place | 2019 Lima | Men's singles C9 |
| Silver medal – second place | 2011 Guadalajara | Men's teams C9-10 |
| Silver medal – second place | 2015 Toronto | Men's teams C9-10 |
| Bronze medal – third place | 2019 Lima | Men's teams C9-10 |

Tahl Leibovitz (born June 1, 1975) is an American para table tennis player who has played in five Paralympic Games. His highest ranking is world no. 2 in class 9 in July 2008 and is now currently ranked world no. 3 in that class and world no. 17 in men's standing classes.

== Biography ==
Leibovitz was born in New York City to parents who struggled with substance abuse and mental illness. He was kicked out of his home and lived on the streets.

He graduated in New York University and now works in New York City as a social worker.

== Sporting career ==
He competed in his first Paralympic Games in Atlanta in 1996 where he won his first gold medal. He qualified for his seventh Paralympic Games in Paris in 2024 Summer Paralympics.
