= Mitchell Seidenfeld =

American para table tennis player

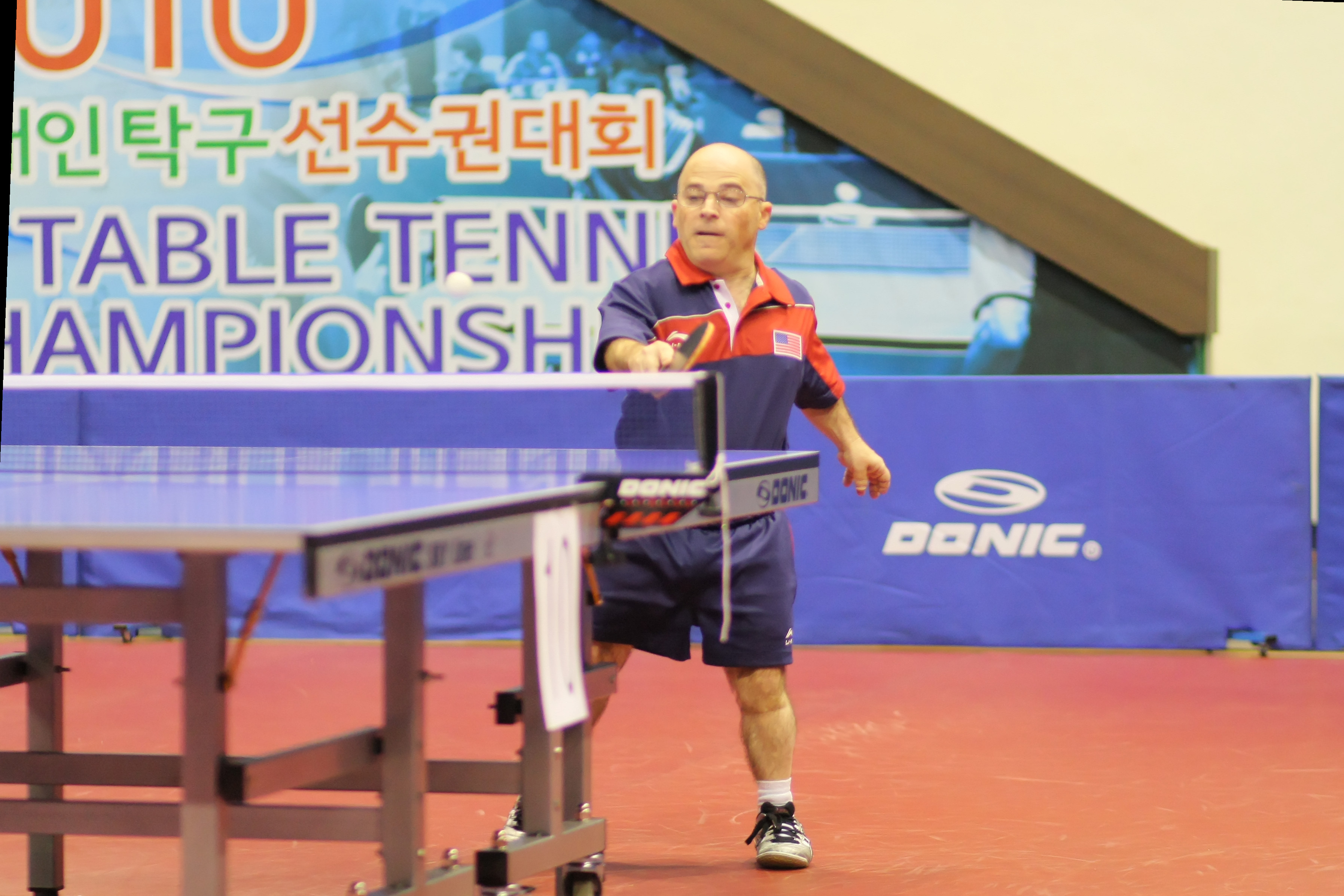
- Seidenfeld in 2010

Personal information
- Born: 18 March 1963 (age 63) Lakeville, Minnesota, U.S.

Sport
- Country: United States
- Sport: Para table tennis
- Disability: Dwarfism
- Disability class: C8
- Retired: 2013
Medal record
Para table tennis
Representing United States
Paralympic Games
Gold medal – first place	1992 Barcelona	Men's singles C8
Silver medal – second place	1996 Atlanta	Men's singles C8
Bronze medal – third place	1992 Barcelona	Men's teams C10
Bronze medal – third place	1996 Atlanta	Men's teams C6-8
World Championships
Gold medal – first place	1990 Assen	Men's singles C8
Bronze medal – third place	1990 Assen	Men's open singles
Parapan American Games
Gold medal – first place	2007 Rio de Janeiro	Men's singles C7
Gold medal – first place	2007 Rio de Janeiro	Men's teams C6-7
Para Pan-American Championships
Gold medal – first place	2005 Mar del Plata	Men's teams C10
Gold medal – first place	2009 Margarita Island	Men's singles C7
Gold medal – first place	2009 Margarita Island	Men's teams C6-7
Silver medal – second place	2005 Mar del Plata	Men's open singles
Silver medal – second place	2009 Margarita Island	Men's open singles
Bronze medal – third place	2005 Mar del Plata	Men's singles C10

Mitchell Seidenfeld (born 18 March 1963) is a former American para table tennis player. His son, Ian Seidenfeld, is also a table tennis player.
