= Lü Xiaolei =

Chinese para table tennis player

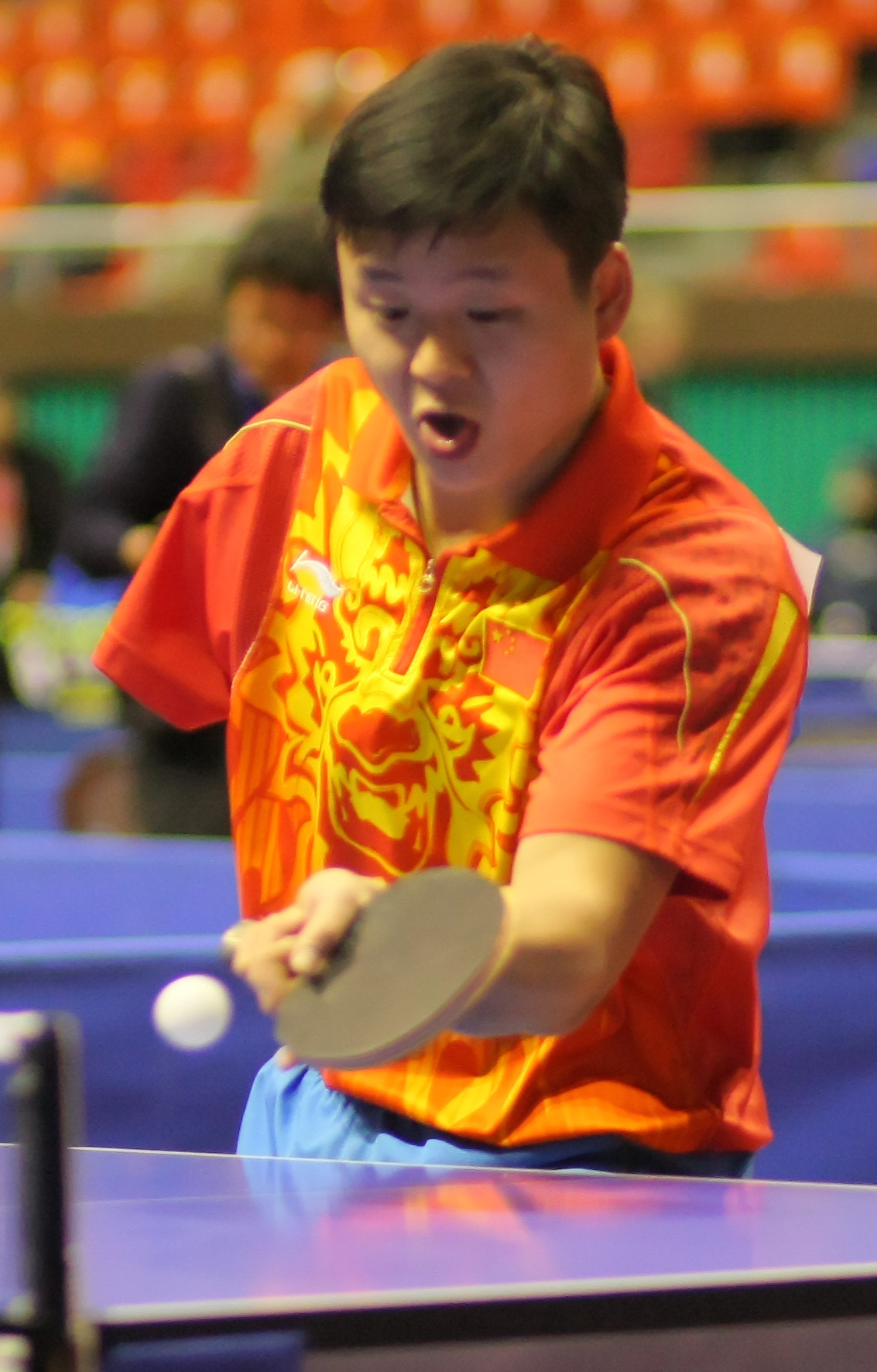
- Lü at the 2010 World Para Table Tennis Championships

Personal information
- Born: November 27, 1982 (age 43) Dongming County, Shandong, China

Sport
- Sport: Table tennis
- Playing style: Left-handed shakehand grip
- Disability class: 9 (2003–2011); 10 (before 2003 and after 2011)
- Highest ranking: 2 (April 2003)
Medal record
Men's para table tennis
Representing China
Paralympic Games
Gold medal – first place	2004 Athens	Teams C10
Gold medal – first place	2008 Beijing	Teams C9–10
Gold medal – first place	2012 London	Teams C9–10
Silver medal – second place	2004 Athens	Singles C9
World Championships
Gold medal – first place	2002 Taipei	Teams C10
Gold medal – first place	2006 Montreux	Teams C10
Gold medal – first place	2010 Gwangju	Teams C10
Silver medal – second place	2010 Gwangju	Singles C9
Bronze medal – third place	1998 Paris	Singles C10
Bronze medal – third place	2006 Montreux	Singles C9
Asian Para Games
Gold medal – first place	2010 Guangzhou	Teams C9–10
FESPIC Games
Gold medal – first place	1999 Bangkok	Singles C10
Gold medal – first place	1999 Bangkok	Open singles standing
Gold medal – first place	1999 Bangkok	Teams C10
Gold medal – first place	2002 Busan	Teams C10
Gold medal – first place	2006 Kuala Lumpur	Teams C9
Silver medal – second place	2002 Busan	Singles C10
Silver medal – second place	2002 Busan	Open singles standing
Silver medal – second place	2006 Kuala Lumpur	Singles C9
Bronze medal – third place	2006 Kuala Lumpur	Open singles standing
Asian Championships
Gold medal – first place	2005 Kuala Lumpur	Teams C10
Gold medal – first place	2007 Seoul	Teams C10
Gold medal – first place	2009 Amman	Singles C9
Gold medal – first place	2009 Amman	Teams C9
Gold medal – first place	2011 Hong Kong	Teams C10
Silver medal – second place	2005 Kuala Lumpur	Open singles standing
Bronze medal – third place	2005 Kuala Lumpur	Singles C9
Bronze medal – third place	2007 Seoul	Singles C9–10
Bronze medal – third place	2007 Seoul	Open singles standing
FESPIC Championships
Gold medal – first place	1999 Taipei	Singles C10
Gold medal – first place	1999 Taipei	Open singles standing
Gold medal – first place	1999 Taipei	Doubles C6–10
Gold medal – first place	1999 Taipei	Teams C10
Gold medal – first place	2001 Osaka	Teams C10
Gold medal – first place	2003 Shanghai	Teams C9
Silver medal – second place	2001 Osaka	Singles C10
Silver medal – second place	2001 Osaka	Open singles standing
Silver medal – second place	2003 Shanghai	Open singles standing
Bronze medal – third place	1997 Hong Kong	Singles C10

Lü Xiaolei
- Traditional Chinese: 呂曉磊
- Simplified Chinese: 吕晓磊
Transcriptions
Standard Mandarin
- Hanyu Pinyin: Lǚ Xiǎolěi

Lü Xiaolei (Chinese: 吕晓磊, born 27 November 1982) is a Chinese retired para table tennis player. He won three Paralympic gold medals and a silver from 2004 to 2012.

Lü, who grew up in a rural family in Dongming County, Shandong, lost his right arm at the age of 7 due to an electric shock. While climbing a wall with friends to watch a movie, he had accidentally touched the power cable.
