= Dezső Berecki =

Hungarian para table tennis player

Personal information
- Nickname: Deszi
- Born: 19 February 1982 (age 44) Sátoraljaújhely, Hungary
- Height: 176 cm (5 ft 9 in)

Sport
- Country: Hungary
- Sport: Para table tennis
- Disability class: C9 (2013-); C10 (1998-2013)
Medal record
Para table tennis
Representing Hungary
European Championships
Silver medal – second place	2001 Frankfurt	Men's teams C10
Bronze medal – third place	2011 Split	Men's teams C10
Bronze medal – third place	2013 Lignano	Men's singles C9
Bronze medal – third place	2019 Helsingborg	Men's teams C9

Desző Berecki (born 19 February 1982) is a Hungarian para table tennis player who competes in international level events. He is a four-time European medalist and has participated at the Paralympic Games five times, his highest achievement was reaching the men's singles' quarterfinal in the 2012 Summer Paralympics where he lost to Jose Manuel Ruiz Reyes in three sets to two.

He was born with a birth defect in his left hand.
