= Tajudeen Agunbiade =

Nigerian para table tennis player

Personal information
- Born: 25 May 1975 (age 51)

Sport
- Country: Nigeria
- Sport: Para table tennis
Medal record
Men's para table tennis (class 9)
Representing Nigeria
Paralympic Games
Gold medal – first place	2000 Sydney	Singles C9
Gold medal – first place	2000 Sydney	Team C9
Bronze medal – third place	2020 Tokyo	Team C9

Tajudeen Agunbiade (born 25 May 1975) is a Nigerian para table tennis player of class 9 and Paralympian.

== Career ==
He represented Nigeria at the 2000 Summer Paralympics held in Sydney, Australia and he competed in table tennis. He won the gold medal at the Men's singles 9 event. He also won the gold medal at the team event together with Tunde Adisa and Femi Alabi.

He also competed at the Men's individual – Class 9–10 and the Men's team – Class 9–10 events at the 2008 Summer Paralympics but did not win a medal.

In July 2019, he won gold at the 2019 ITTF African Para Table Tennis Championships which meant that he qualified to represent Nigeria at the 2020 Summer Paralympics in Tokyo, Japan. He won one of the bronze medals in the men's team C9-10 event.

== Achievements ==
Year	Competition	Location	Position	Event
2000	Summer Paralympics	Sydney, Australia	1st	Singles C9
2000	Summer Paralympics	Sydney, Australia	1st	Team C9
2021	Summer Paralympics	Tokyo, Japan	3rd	Team C9-10
