= Gyula Zborai =

Hungarian para table tennis player

Personal information
- Full name: Gyula Istvan Zborai
- Born: 18 December 1962 (age 63) Nagykanizsa, Hungary
- Height: 160 cm (5 ft 3 in)

Sport
- Country: Hungary
- Sport: Para table tennis
- Disability class: C8
Medal record
Para table tennis
Representing Hungary
World Championships
Bronze medal – third place	2010 Gwangju	Men's teams C9
Bronze medal – third place	2014 Beijing	Men's teams C8
European Championships
Silver medal – second place	2005 Jesolo	Men's singles C9
Silver medal – second place	2013 Lignano	Men's teams C8
Silver medal – second place	2015 Vejle	Men's singles C8
Bronze medal – third place	2003 Zagreb	Men's singles C9
Bronze medal – third place	2009 Genoa	Men's teams C9
Bronze medal – third place	2019 Helsingborg	Men's teams C9

Gyula Istvan Zborai (born 18 December 1962) is a Hungarian para table tennis player who competes in international level events. He is a double World bronze medalist and a six-time European medalist.
