= Alabi Olabiyi Olufemi =

Nigerian para table tennis player

Femi Alabi
Personal information
- Native name: Alabi Olabiyi Olufemi
- Born: 6 January 1973 (age 53)

Sport
- Country: Nigeria
- Sport: Para table tennis
Medal record
Men's para table tennis (class 9)
Representing Nigeria
Paralympic Games
Gold medal – first place	2000 Sydney	Team C9
Bronze medal – third place	2000 Sydney	Singles C9
Bronze medal – third place	2020 Tokyo	Team C9

Alabi Olabiyi Olufemi (born 6 January 1973), also known as Femi Alabi, is a Nigerian para table tennis player and Paralympian.

== Career ==
He represented Nigeria at the 2000 Summer Paralympics held in Sydney, Australia and he competed in table tennis. He won the bronze medal at the Men's singles 9 event.

He also won the gold medal at the team event together with Tajudeen Agunbiade and Tunde Adisa.

In July 2019, he qualified to represent Nigeria at the 2020 Summer Paralympics in Tokyo, Japan after winning the individual class 10 event at the 2019 ITTF African Para Table Tennis Championships. He won one of the bronze medals in the men's team C9-10 event at the 2020 Summer Paralympics.

== Achievements ==
Year	Competition	Location	Position	Event
2000	Summer Paralympics	Sydney, Australia	3rd	Singles C9
2000	Summer Paralympics	Sydney, Australia	1st	Team C9
2021	Summer Paralympics	Tokyo, Japan	3rd	Team C9-10
