= Gerben Last =

Dutch para table tennis player

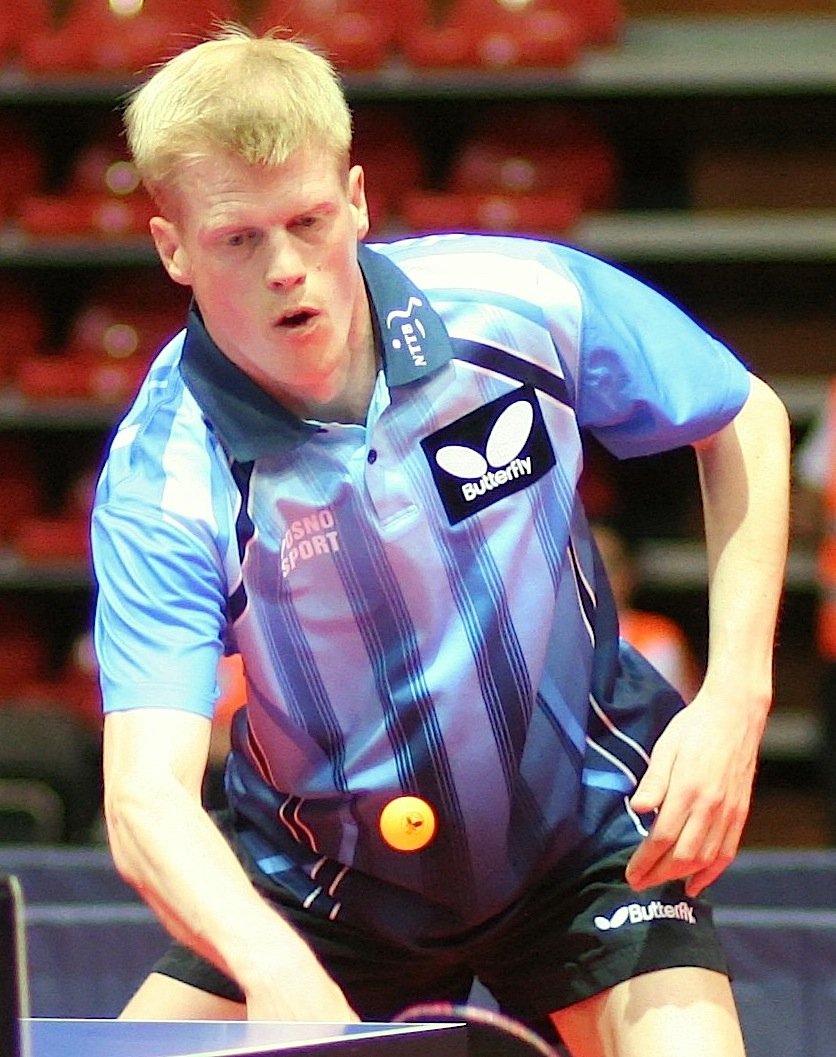
- Gerben Last (2009)

Personal information
- Born: 19 October 1985 (age 40) Zwolle, Netherlands

Sport
- Country: Netherlands
- Sport: Para table tennis
Medal record
Representing Netherlands
Paralympic Games
Gold medal – first place	2004 Athens	Teams C9
Silver medal – second place	2016 Rio de Janeiro	Singles C9
Bronze medal – third place	2012 London	Singles C9
World Championships
Gold medal – first place	2010 Gwangju	Teams C9
Bronze medal – third place	2010 Gwangju	Singles C9
European Championships
Gold medal – first place	2007 Kranjska Gora	Teams C9
Silver medal – second place	2003 Zagreb	Singles C9
Silver medal – second place	2003 Zagreb	Teams C9
Silver medal – second place	2009 Genoa	Singles C9
Silver medal – second place	2009 Genoa	Teams C9
Silver medal – second place	2011 Split	Singles C9
Silver medal – second place	2011 Split	Teams C9

Gerben Last (born 19 October 1985) is a Dutch para table tennis player who represented the Netherlands at the Summer Paralympics in 2004, 2008, 2012 and 2016.

At the 2004 Summer Paralympics, he won the gold medal in the men's team C9 event. He won two medals in individual table tennis events: the bronze medal in the men's individual C9 event at the 2012 Summer Paralympics and the silver medal in the men's individual C9 at the 2016 Summer Paralympics.

In 2004, he received the Order of the Netherlands Lion decoration.
