= Ivan Karabec =

Czech para table tennis player

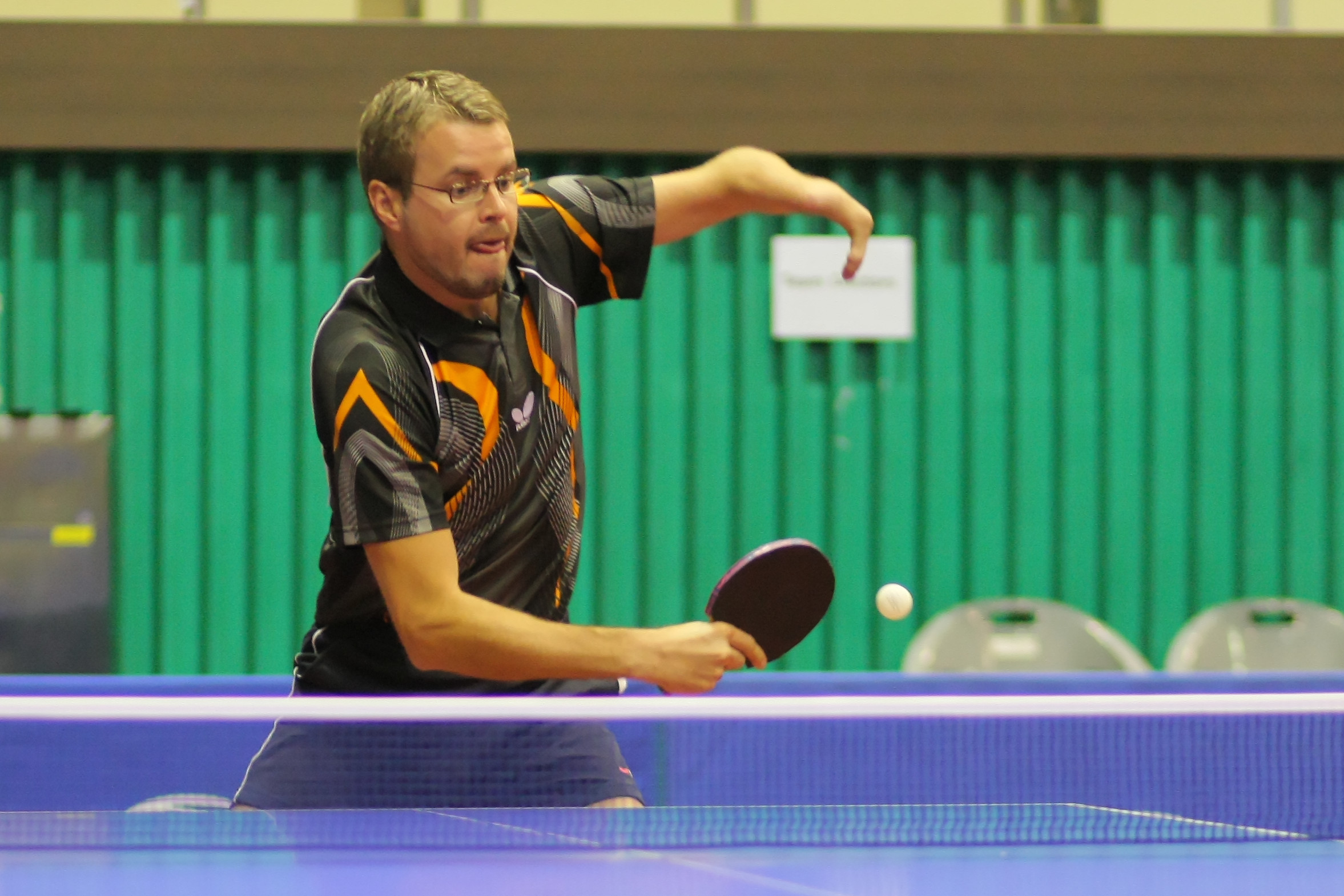
- Karabec at 2010 World Championships

Personal information
- Nickname: Karbo
- Born: 13 September 1980 (age 45) České Budějovice, Czechoslovakia
- Height: 1.80 m (5 ft 11 in)

Sport
- Country: Czech Republic
- Sport: Para table tennis
- Disability class: C10
- Coached by: Kamil Koutny
Medal record
Para table tennis
Representing Czech Republic
Paralympic Games
Gold medal – first place	2000 Sydney	Men's singles C10
Silver medal – second place	2000 Sydney	Men's teams C10
World Championships
Gold medal – first place	2006 Montreux	Men's singles C10
Silver medal – second place	1998 Paris	Men's teams C10
Silver medal – second place	2002 Taipei	Men's teams C10
Silver medal – second place	2006 Montreux	Men's teams C10
Silver medal – second place	2006 Montreux	Men's open singles
Silver medal – second place	2010 Gwangju	Men's singles C10
Bronze medal – third place	2002 Taipei	Men's open singles
Bronze medal – third place	2002 Taipei	Men's singles C10
Bronze medal – third place	2014 Beijing	Men's singles C10
European Championships
Gold medal – first place	2003 Zagreb	Men's singles C10
Gold medal – first place	2007 Kranjska Gora	Men's singles C9-10
Gold medal – first place	2009 Genoa	Men's open singles
Silver medal – second place	2005 Jesolo	Men's open singles
Silver medal – second place	2007 Kranjska Gora	Men's open singles
Bronze medal – third place	1997 Stockholm	Men's singles C10
Bronze medal – third place	1999 Piešťany	Men's teams C10
Bronze medal – third place	2001 Frankfurt	Men's singles C10
Bronze medal – third place	2001 Frankfurt	Men's teams C10
Bronze medal – third place	2003 Zagreb	Men's open singles
Bronze medal – third place	2003 Zagreb	Men's teams C10
Bronze medal – third place	2005 Jesolo	Men's singles C10
Bronze medal – third place	2005 Jesolo	Men's teams C10
Bronze medal – third place	2007 Kranjska Gora	Men's teams C10
Bronze medal – third place	2015 Vejle	Men's singles C10

Ivan Karabec (born 13 September 1980) is a Czech para table tennis player who competes in international elite events. He is a Paralympic champion, World champion and triple European champion. He was born with undeveloped left arm.
