= Jorge Cardona =

Spanish table tennis player (born 1987)

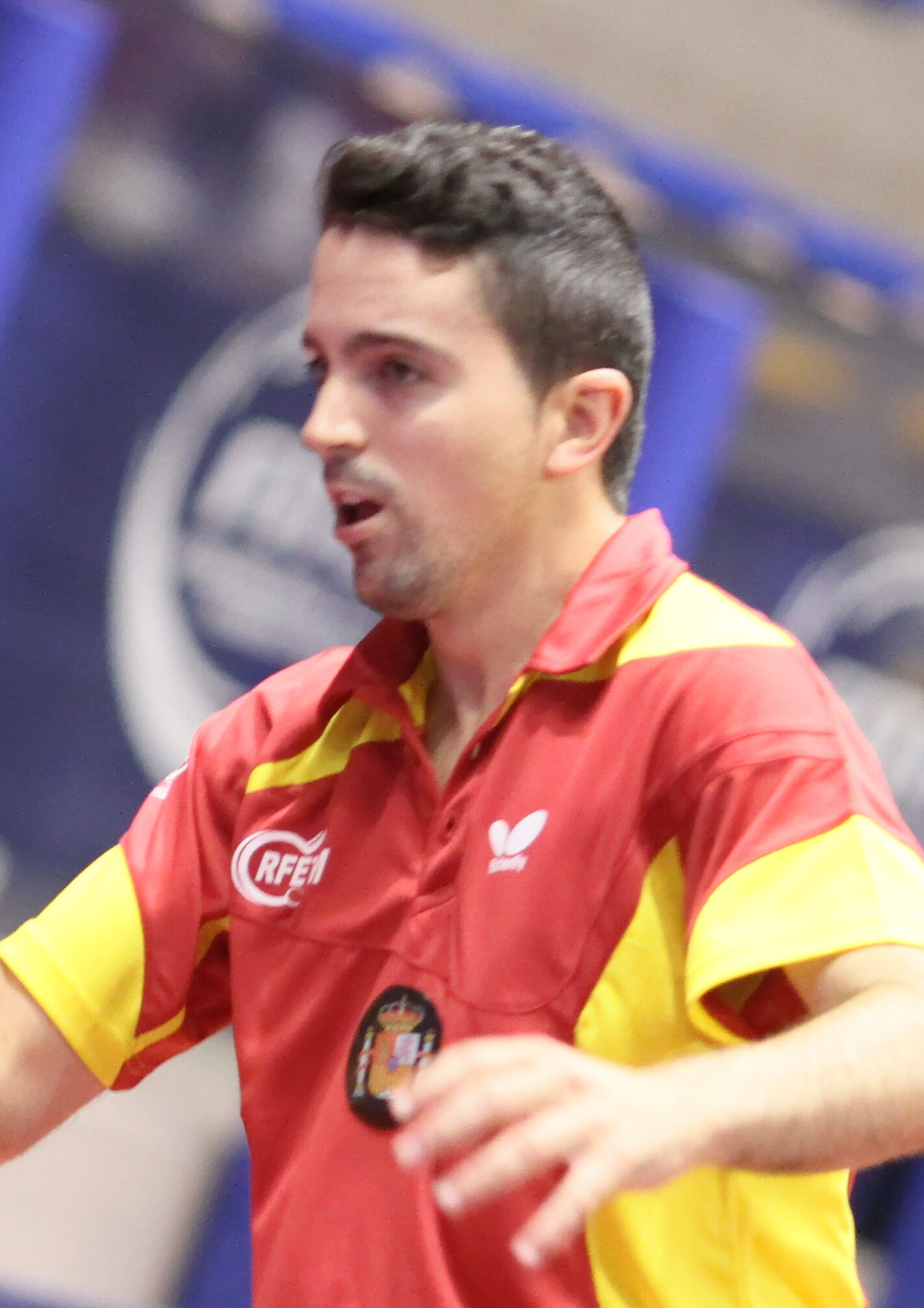
- Jorge Cardona, in 2013.

Personal information
- Full name: Jorge Cardona Marquez
- Nationality: Spanish
- Born: 2 November 1987 (age 38) Zaragoza, Spain

Sport
- Country: Spain
- Sport: Table tennis (class 9)
Medal record
Table tennis
Representing Spain
Paralympic Games
| Silver medal – second place | 2008 Beijing | Team |
| Bronze medal – third place | 2012 London | Team Class 9–10 |
| Silver medal – second place | 2016 Rio | Team Class 9-10 |

Jorge Cardona Marquez (born 2 November 1987 in Zaragoza) is a class 9 table tennis player from Spain.

== Personal ==
In 2013, he was awarded the bronze Real Orden al Mérito Deportivo, at a ceremony at the Teatro de Madrid Cofidis, and attended by Princess Elena, Minister of Education, Culture and Sport, José Ignacio Wert, the president of the Higher Sports Council (CSD), Miguel Cardinal, and the Director General of Sports of CSD, Ana Muñoz.

== Table tennis ==
He is a class 9 table tennis player. But when he is a class 10 table tennis player won a gold medal at the 2007 European Championships in 2007. At the Italian hosted 2009 European Championships, he won a gold medal. In 2010 at the South Korean hosted World Championships, he finished second. He competed in the 2013 European Championships, earning a bronze in the individual event and a silver in the silver in the team event. In October 2013, he was ranked eighth in the world in his classification.

=== Paralympics ===
He played table tennis at the 2008 Summer Paralympics and the 2012 Summer Paralympics. In 2008, he finished second in team table tennis. In 2012, he finished third in team class 9–10.
