= Fredrik Andersson (table tennis) =

Swedish para table tennis player

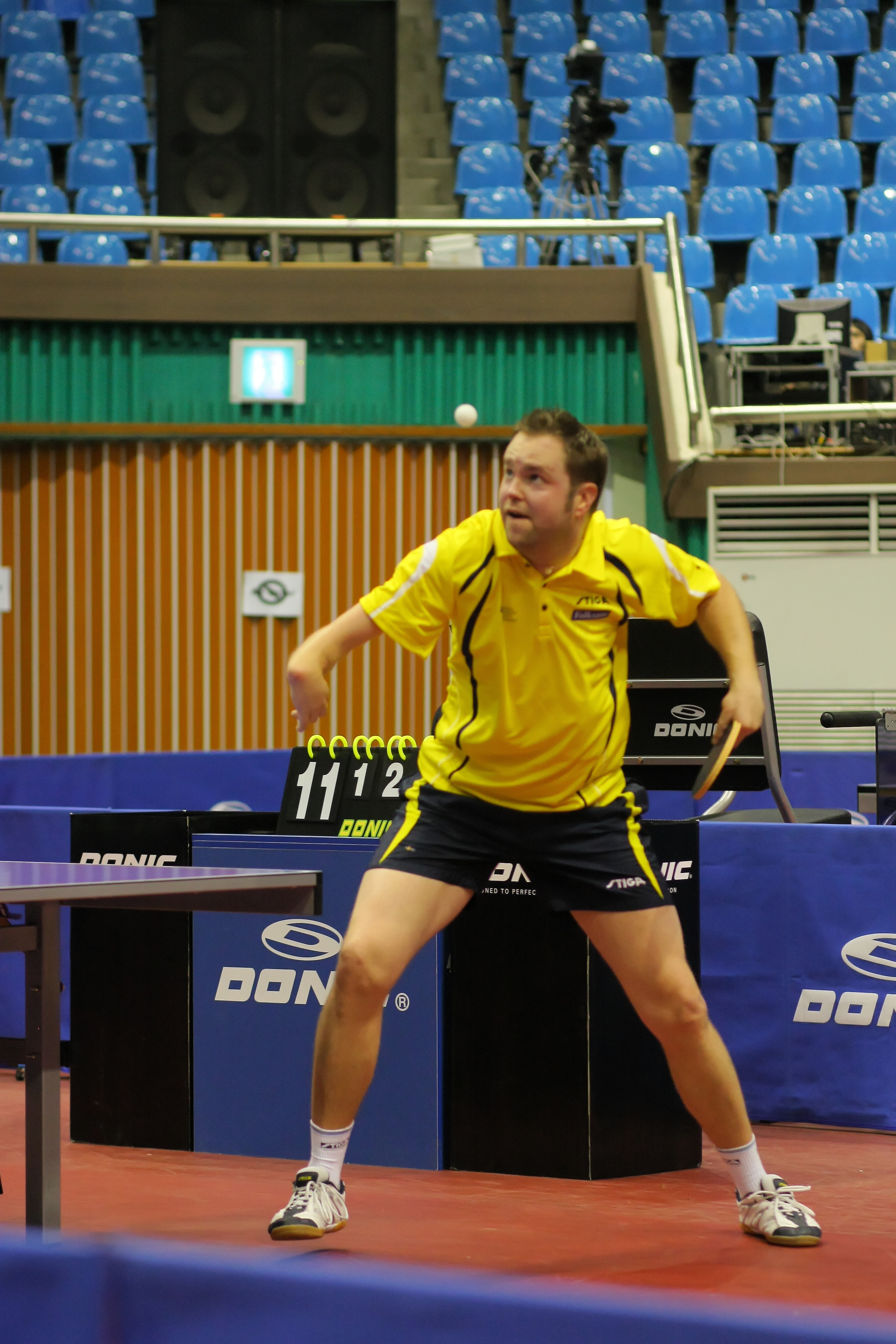
- Andersson at 2010 World Championships

Personal information
- Born: 3 July 1980 (age 45) Falköping, Sweden

Sport
- Sport: Para table tennis
Medal record
Representing Sweden
Paralympic Games
Silver medal – second place	2004 Athens	Singles C10
Bronze medal – third place	2000 Sydney	Singles C10
Bronze medal – third place	2004 Athens	Teams C10
Bronze medal – third place	2008 Beijing	Singles C10
European Championships
Gold medal – first place	2003 Zagreb	Teams C10
Silver medal – second place	1997 Stockholm	Singles C10
Silver medal – second place	2005 Jesolo	Singles C10
Silver medal – second place	2005 Jesolo	Teams C10
Silver medal – second place	2007 Kranjska Gora	Teams C10
Bronze medal – third place	1997 Stockholm	Teams C10
Bronze medal – third place	2005 Jesolo	Open singles standing
Bronze medal – third place	2007 Kranjska Gora	Singles C9-10
Bronze medal – third place	2009 Genoa	Open singles standing
Bronze medal – third place	2009 Genoa	Singles C10
Bronze medal – third place	2009 Genoa	Teams C10
Bronze medal – third place	2011 Split	Singles C10

Fredrik Andersson (born 3 July 1980) is a Swedish former para table tennis player who competed at international table tennis competitions. He is a four-time Paralympic medalist and 12-time European medalist. He was the first table tennis player in his class to win a medal in three consecutive Paralympic Games.
