= José Manuel Ruiz Reyes =

Spanish para table tennis player

José Manuel Ruiz
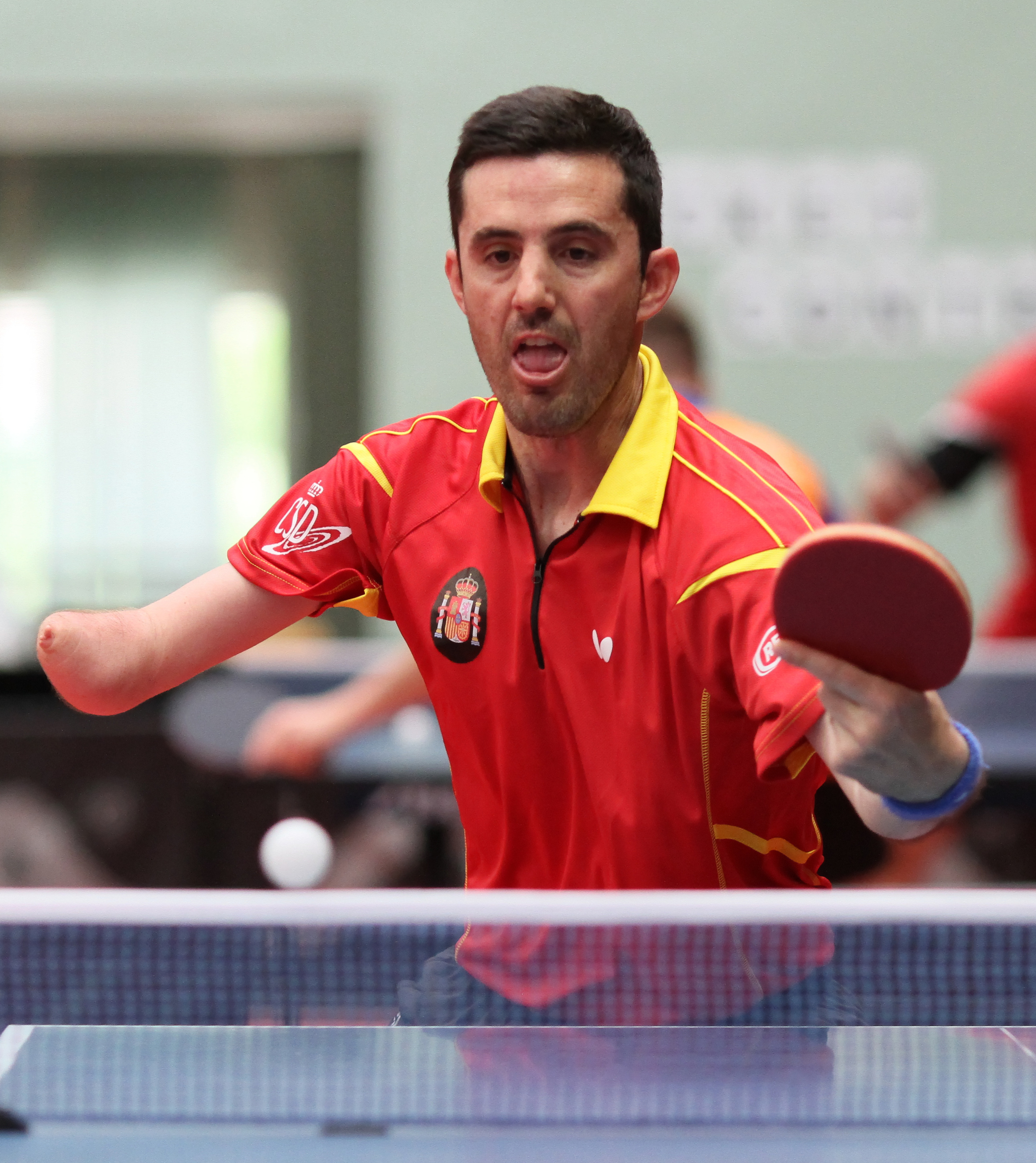

Personal information
- Full name: José Manuel Ruiz Reyes
- Nationality: Spanish
- Born: 16 July 1978 (age 47) Granada, Spain

Sport
- Sport: Table tennis (class 10)
Medal record
Table tennis
Representing Spain
Paralympic Games
Silver medal – second place	2000 Sydney	Class 6-10 singles open
Bronze medal – third place	2000 Sydney	Team class 10
Silver medal – second place	2008 Beijing	Team class 9–10
Bronze medal – third place	2012 London	Team class 9–10
Silver medal – second place	2016 Rio de Janeiro	Team class 9–10

José Manuel Ruiz Reyes (born 16 July 1978) is a class 10 table tennis player from Spain. He competed at six consecutive Paralympics from 1996 to 2016 and won one individual and four team medals. In 2013, he was awarded the bronze Real Orden al Mérito Deportivo.
