= European Para Table Tennis Championships =

Biennial sport event for para table tennis

European Para Table Tennis Championships are a biennial sport event for para table tennis players who represent a European country. It is one of the first regional para table tennis championships to be held. France have so far earned the most medals in these championships.

== Editions ==
Edition	Year	Host	Dates	Competitors	Countries	Top medalists	Ref	Events
1	1985	(Netherlands) Delden	8–13 October	31	15	West Germany (24)		
2	1987	(United Kingdom) Stoke Mandeville	28–31 October	64	18	West Germany (31)		
3	1989	(Austria) Vienna	30 July – 5 August	129	20	West Germany (39)		
4	1991	(Spain) Salou	1–5 October	126	23	Germany (40)		
5	1995	(Denmark) Hillerød	13–18 October	200	23	France (25)		
6	1997	(Sweden) Stockholm	2–7 August	224	26	France (23)		
7	1999	(Slovakia) Piešťany	8–14 July	341	32	France (31)		
8	2001	(Germany) Frankfurt	14–21 July	277	28	France (28)		
9	2003	(Croatia) Zagreb	19–29 June	286	34	France (23)		
10	2005	(Italy) Jesolo	15–26 September	336	35	France (25)		
11	2007	(Slovenia) Kranjska Gora	10–21 October	322	35	France (22)		
12	2009	(Italy) Genoa	3–14 June	279	28	France (20)		
13	2011	(Croatia) Split	22–28 October	292	31	France (21)		
14	2013	(Italy) Lignano	27 September – 4 October	289	30	France (18)		
15	2015	(Denmark) Vejle	12–18 October	273	31	France (18)		
16	2017	(Slovenia) Laško	28 September – 4 October	287	31	Turkey (12)		
17	2019	(Sweden) Helsingborg	16–21 September	313	31	France (13)		
18	2023	(United Kingdom) Sheffield	4–9 September	267	35	Poland (10)		35
19	2025	(Sweden) Helsingborg	20–25 November	265	37	France		

== All-time medal count ==
As of 2025.

Rank	Nation	Gold	Silver	Bronze	Total
1	France	128	118	135	381
2	Germany	83	64	81	228
3	Poland	54	46	58	158
4	West Germany	52	17	25	94
5	Austria	37	37	49	123
6	Ukraine	29	16	35	80
7	Czech Republic	26	25	37	88
8	Sweden	24	33	60	117
9	Belgium	24	13	18	55
10	Great Britain	23	40	63	126
11	Turkey	22	25	31	78
12	Russia	20	27	36	83
13	Slovakia	19	25	27	71
14	Spain	19	18	44	81
15	Norway	16	12	12	40
16	Hungary	15	22	23	60
17	Netherlands	14	29	33	76
18	Serbia	13	13	17	43
19	Italy	11	25	33	69
20	Croatia	10	6	11	27
21	Denmark	9	16	21	46
22	Switzerland	9	12	11	32
23	Finland	9	11	19	39
24	Slovenia	4	2	10	16
25	Yugoslavia	2	6	6	14
26	Ireland	1	5	12	18
27	Israel	1	1	9	11
28	Serbia and Montenegro	1	0	2	3
29	Montenegro	0	3	3	6
30	Bulgaria	0	2	2	4
31	Greece	0	1	2	3
31	Romania	0	1	2	3
33	Portugal	0	1	1	2
34	Czechoslovakia	0	1	0	1
Totals (34 entries)		675	673	928	2,276

== See also ==
- European Table Tennis Championships
- Table tennis at the Summer Paralympics
- World Para Table Tennis Championships
