= World Para Table Tennis Championships =

World championships for para table tennis

The World Para Table Tennis Championships are the world championships for para table tennis where athletes with a disability compete. They are organised by the International Table Tennis Federation (ITTF) on a four-year rotation with the Paralympic Games (every four years).

The first edition was held in 1990 in Assen, Netherlands, the second in 1998, from that the championships was held every four years.

== Locations ==
Individual and Team	Individual	Team

Edition	Year	Host	Dates	Nations	Competitors	Most golds won	Ref
1	1990	(Netherlands) Assen	15–21 July	35	226	Germany (14)	
2	1998	(France) Paris	24–30 October	39	292	France (10)	
3	2002	(Taiwan) Taipei	15–22 August	45	319	China (8)	
4	2006	(Switzerland) Montreux	22 September–1 October	48	346	China (14)	
5	2010	(South Korea) Gwangju	25 October–3 November	46	296	China (14)	
6	2014	(China) Beijing	6–15 September	45	304	China (14)	
1	2017	(Slovakia) Bratislava	17–20 May	34	247	Russia (3)	
7	2018	(Slovenia) Laško	15–21 October	56	330	South Korea (4)	
8	2022	(Spain) Granada	6–12 November	51	328	South Korea (11)	
9	2026	(Thailand) Pattaya	13–19 November	64	330		

== All-time medal count ==
As 2022 (including medals won at the 2017 team championships)

Rank	NPC	Gold	Silver	Bronze	Total
1	China (CHN)	54	25	27	106
2	France (FRA)	39	32	56	127
3	Germany (GER)	36	22	33	91
4	South Korea (KOR)	33	26	28	87
5	Poland (POL)	16	21	20	57
6	Spain (ESP)	9	7	13	29
7	Austria (AUT)	7	12	15	34
8	Sweden (SWE)	7	11	18	36
9	Netherlands (NED)	7	9	9	25
10	Czech Republic (CZE)	6	11	9	26
11	Slovakia (SVK)	6	9	11	26
12	Great Britain (GBR)	6	7	19	32
13	Ukraine (UKR)	6	7	8	21
14	Russia (RUS)	6	7	6	19
15	Turkey (TUR)	5	9	13	27
16	Italy (ITA)	5	5	11	21
17	Belgium (BEL)	5	3	9	17
18	Serbia (SRB)	5	1	9	15
19	Norway (NOR)	4	6	4	14
20	Hong Kong (HKG)	4	5	3	12
21	Japan (JPN)	3	7	10	20
22	Denmark (DEN)	3	5	4	12
23	Chinese Taipei (TPE)	2	8	15	25
24	Finland (FIN)	2	3	7	12
25	Australia (AUS)	2	2	5	9
26	Brazil (BRA)	2	1	9	12
27	Thailand (THA)	1	7	7	15
28	Hungary (HUN)	1	4	3	8
29	Croatia (CRO)	1	3	4	8
30	Jordan (JOR)	1	3	3	7
31	United States (USA)	1	2	7	10
32	Israel (ISR)	1	2	3	6
32	Switzerland (SUI)	1	2	3	6
34	Mexico (MEX)	1	1	1	3
35	Yugoslavia	0	1	5	6
36	Indonesia (INA)	0	1	2	3
37	Bulgaria (BUL)	0	1	0	1
38	Argentina (ARG)	0	0	5	5
39	Egypt (EGY)	0	0	3	3
39	Ireland (IRL)	0	0	3	3
41	Slovenia (SLO)	0	0	2	2
42	Greece (GRE)	0	0	1	1
42	Iran (IRI)	0	0	1	1
42	Romania (ROU)	0	0	1	1
Totals (44 entries)		288	288	425	1,001

== See also ==
- International Table Tennis Federation
- Table tennis at the Summer Paralympics
- World Table Tennis Championships
