= Table tennis at the 2008 Summer Paralympics – Women's team – Class 4–5 =

Women's Team Class 4–5 at the XIII Paralympic Games
- Venue: Peking University Gymnasium
- Dates: 13 – 16 September 2008
- Competitors: 14

Medalists
1st place, gold medalist(s)		Ren Guixiang; Gu Gai; Zhang Bian; Zhou Ying	China
2nd place, silver medalist(s)		Andrea Zimmerer; Monika Sikora Weinmann	Germany
3rd place, bronze medalist(s)		Fatmeh Al-Azzam; Khetam Abuawad; Maha Bargouthi	Jordan

The Women's Team Class 4–5 table tennis competition at the 2008 Summer Paralympics was held between 13 September and 16 September at the Peking University Gymnasium. Classes 6–10 were for athletes with a physical impairment who competed from a standing position; the lower the number, the greater the impact the impairment had on an athlete’s ability to compete.

The competition was a straight knock-out format. Each tie was decided by the best of a potential five matches, two singles, a doubles (not necessarily the same players) and two reverse singles.

The event was won by the team representing China.

== Competition bracket ==
Round of 16
Poland	1
Sweden	3
Chinese Taipei	3
Mexico	0
South Africa	0
Jordan	3
Serbia	3
Great Britain	0
South Korea	1
Italy	3
Slovenia	3
Hong Kong	1

Quarterfinals
China	3
Sweden	0
Chinese Taipei	2
Jordan	3
Serbia	3
Italy	1
Slovenia	1
Germany	3

Semifinals
China	3
Jordan	1
Serbia	1
Germany	3

Final
China	3
Germany	1
Third place
Jordan	3
Serbia	1

== First round ==
13 September 2008; 10:00	Sweden	3–1	Poland

Report	Individual matches
Ingela Lundback	3–0	Miroslawa Rozmiej	11–4, 11–4, 11–3
Anna-Carin Ahlquist	3–2	Barbara Barszcz	11–3, 13–11, 9–11, 6–11, 12–10
Ingela Lundback / Anna-Carin Ahlquist	0–3	Miroslawa Rozmiej / Barbara Barszcz	7–11, 10–12, 9–11
Ingela Lundback	3–0	Barbara Barszcz	11–4, 11–3, 11–5

13 September 2008; 10:00	Chinese Taipei	3–0	Mexico

Report	Individual matches
Tsai Hui-chu	3–0	Teresa Arenales	11–1, 11–9, 11–5
Wei Mei-hui	3–1	Maria Paredes	11–5, 11–5, 5–11, 11–1
Tsai Hui Chu / Wei Mei Hui	3–2	Teresa Arenales / Maria Paredes	9–11, 11–9, 9–11, 11–8, 11–7

13 September 2008; 10:00	South Africa	0–3	Jordan

Report	Individual matches
Alet Moll	0–3	Fatmeh Al-Azzam	6–11, 9–11, 4–11
Alisha Almeida	0–3	Khetam Abuawad	5–11, 10–12, 7–11
Alet Moll / Alisha Almeida	0–3	Fatmeh Al-Azzam / Khetam Abuawad	4–11, 6–11, 5–11

13 September 2008; 10:00	Serbia	3–0	Great Britain

Report	Individual matches
Borislava Perić	3–0	Claire Robertson	11–6, 11–5, 11–8
Nada Matic	3–2	Sue Gilroy	11–13, 11–2, 11–6, 7–11, 11–8
Borislava Perić / Nada Matic	3–0	Claire Robertson / Sue Gilroy	11–8, 14–12, 12–10

13 September 2008; 10:00	South Korea	1–3	Italy

Report	Individual matches
Moon Sung-hye	3–0	Maria Nardelli	12–10, 11–7, 11–4
Jung Ji-nam	2–3	Valeria Zorzetto	13–15, 11–8, 4–11, 12–10, 8–11
Moon Sung Hye / Choi Hyun Ja	1–3	Maria Nardelli / Valeria Zorzetto	9–11, 11–8, 6–11, 8–11
Moon Sung-hye	1–3	Valeria Zorzetto	3–11, 11–3, 5–11, 8–11

13 September 2008; 16:30	Slovenia	3–1	Hong Kong

Report	Individual matches
Mateja Pintar	3–0	Wong Pui Yi	11–7, 11–5, 11–5
Andreja Dolinar	0–3	Chan Siu Ling	5–11, 4–11, 9–11
Mateja Pintar / Andreja Dolinar	3–0	Wong Pui Yi / Chan Siu Ling	11–8, 11–5, 11–6
Mateja Pintar	3–0	Chan Siu Ling	11–7, 11–6, 11–2

== Quarter-finals ==
14 September 2008; 16:30	China	3–0	Sweden

Report	Individual matches
Ren Guixiang	3–0	Ingela Lundback	11–8, 11–8, 11–8
Gu Gai	3–0	Anna-Carin Ahlquist	11–2, 11–6, 11–4
Zhou Ying / Zhang Bian	3–2	Ingela Lundback / Anna-Carin Ahlquist	2–11, 8–11, 11–4, 11–5, 12–10

14 September 2008; 16:30	Chinese Taipei	2–3	Jordan

Report	Individual matches
Wei Mei-hui	3–1	Fatmeh Al-Azzam	11–9, 6–11, 11–7, 15–13
Tsai Hui-chu	0–3	Khetam Abuawad	6–11, 6–11, 5–11
Wei Mei Hui / Tsai Hui Chu	3–1	Fatmeh Al-Azzam / Khetam Abuawad	12–10, 8–11, 11–7, 11–7
Wei Mei-hui	2–3	Khetam Abuawad	7–11, 11–4, 10–12, 11–7, 3–11
Tsai Hui-chu	0–3	Fatmeh Al-Azzam	8–11, 6–11, 1–11

14 September 2008; 16:30	Serbia	3–1	Italy

Report	Individual matches
Borislava Perić	3–0	Maria Nardelli	12–10, 11–7, 13–11
Nada Matic	0–3	Valeria Zorzetto	13–15, 9–11, 12–14
Borislava Perić / Nada Matic	3–2	Maria Nardelli / Valeria Zorzetto	11–13, 8–11, 11–6, 11–7, 11–9
Borislava Perić	3–1	Valeria Zorzetto	9–11, 11–8, 11–8, 11–7

14 September 2008; 16:30	Slovenia	1–3	Germany

Report	Individual matches
Mateja Pintar	3–2	M. Sikora Weinmann	8–11, 6–11, 11–9, 11–2, 11–3
Andreja Dolinar	0–3	Andrea Zimmerer	2–11, 4–11, 3–11
Mateja Pintar / Andreja Dolinar	0–3	M. Sikora Weinmann / Andrea Zimmerer	7–11, 9–11, 8–11
Mateja Pintar	0–3	Andrea Zimmerer	6–11, 9–11, 5–11

== Semi-finals ==
15 September 2008; 10:00	Jordan	1–3	China

Report	Individual matches
Khetam Abuawad	3–0	Gu Gai	11–8, 11–9, 14–12
Fatmeh Al-Azzam	0–3	Ren Guixiang	6–11, 8–11, 4–11
Khetam Abuawad / Fatmeh Al-Azzam	0–3	Gu Gai / Ren Guixiang	10–12, 5–11, 4–11
Khetam Abuawad	0–3	Ren Guixiang	8–11, 4–11, 5–11

15 September 2008; 10:00	Germany	3–1	Serbia

Report	Individual matches
Andrea Zimmerer	3–0	Nada Matic	11–4, 11–3, 11–6
Monik Sikora Weinmann	2–3	Borislava Perić	11–8, 11–5, 5–11, 2–11, 2–11
Andrea Zimmerer / Monik Sikora Weinmann	3–0	Nada Matic / Borislava Perić	11–6, 11–2, 11–5
Andrea Zimmerer	3–1	Borislava Perić	11–7, 11–3, 8–11, 15–13

== Finals ==
Gold medal match

16 September 2008; 10:00	China	3–1	Germany

Report	Individual matches
Ren Guixiang	3–0	Monik Sikora Weinmann	11–6, 11–5, 11–6
Gu Gai	2–3	Andrea Zimmerer	11–4, 6–11, 8–11, 11–4, 13–15
Ren Guixiang / Gu Gai	3–0	Monika Sikora Weinmann / Andrea Zimmerer	11–3, 11–6, 13–11
Ren Guixiang	3–0	Andrea Zimmerer	11–3, 11–2, 11–8

Bronze medal match

16 September 2008; 10:00	Jordan	3–1	Serbia

Report	Individual matches
Khetam Abuawad	3–0	Nada Matic	11–8, 11–4, 11–7
Fatmeh Al-Azzam	0–3	Borislava Perić	3–11, 8–11, 4–11
Khetam Abuawad / Fatmeh Al-Azzam	3–2	Nada Matic / Borislava Perić	8–11, 11–7, 10–12, 12–10, 11–5
Khetam Abuawad	3–1	Borislava Perić	11–6, 11–3, 7–11, 11–7

== Team Lists ==
China; Ren Guixiang; Gu Gai; Zhang Bian; Zhou Ying	Germany; Andrea Zimmerer; Monika Sikora Weinmann	Jordan; Fatmeh Al-Azzam; Khetam Abuawad; Maha Bargouthi	Serbia; Nada Matic; Borislava Perić
Sweden; Ingela Lundback; Anna-Carin Ahlquist	Poland; Miroslawa Rozmiej; Barbara Barszcz	Chinese Taipei; Wei Mei Hui; Tsai Hui Chu	Mexico; Teresa Arenales; Maria Paredes
South Africa; Alet Moll; Alisha Almeida	Great Britain; Claire Robertson; Sue Gilroy	South Korea; Choi Hyun Ja; Jung Ji Nam; Moon Sung Hye	Italy; Maria Nardelli; Valeria Zorzetto
Slovenia; Mateja Pintar; Andreja Dolinar	Hong Kong; Wong Pui Yi; Chan Siu Ling		
