= Fiji at the 2016 Summer Paralympics =

- IPC code: FIJ
- NPC: Fiji Paralympic Association

in Rio de Janeiro
- Competitors: 2 in 2 sports
- Medals: Gold 0 Silver 0 Bronze 0 Total 0

Summer Paralympics appearances (overview)
- 1964; 1968–1972; 1976; 1980–1992; 1996; 2000; 2004; 2008; 2012; 2016; 2020; 2024

Fiji competed at the 2016 Summer Paralympics in Rio de Janeiro, Brazil, from 7 September to 18 September 2016.

== Funding ==
Some private funding supported Fijian participation at the Paralympic Games. $4,000 was donated to the team by the International School Suva. These funds were raised as part of a Fun Day event run by the school. Fiji Athletics received $5,000 in sponsorship in July 2016. This money was shared between Olympic and Paralympic athletics.

== Team ==
The national team coach is Fred Fatiaki.

== Disability classifications ==
Every participant at the Paralympics has their disability grouped into one of five disability categories; amputation, the condition may be congenital or sustained through injury or illness; cerebral palsy; wheelchair athletes, there is often overlap between this and other categories; visual impairment, including blindness; Les autres, any physical disability that does not fall strictly under one of the other categories, for example dwarfism or multiple sclerosis. Each Paralympic sport then has its own classifications, dependent upon the specific physical demands of competition. Events are given a code, made of numbers and letters, describing the type of event and classification of the athletes competing. Some sports, such as athletics, divide athletes by both the category and severity of their disabilities, other sports, for example swimming, group competitors from different categories together, the only separation being based on the severity of the disability.

== Athletics ==
Athletes from Fiji tried to qualify for the Rio Paralympics. One such athlete was Varayame Naikolevu. He competed at the Melanesian Athletics Championship, and an IPC Athletics event in Brisbane, Queensland in the shot put but was unable to set a qualifying mark for the Rio Games. Epeli Baleibau will represent Fiji in athletics at the 2016 Summer Paralympics in High Jump.

Men

Athlete	Event	Height	Rank
Epeli Baleibau	High Jump T45-47	1.70	11

== Table tennis ==
A Fijian had been invited to participate in table tennis at the Rio Games. Mere Rodan qualified for Rio after defeating Australia's number 1 ranked player. She did not use a sport specific chair in competition because she could not afford one. Table Tennis Fiji was actively trying to raise funds to acquire a specialized chair for her to use in Rio and to allow other table tennis players with disabilities to use back at home. Most of the chairs the organization has are donated day chairs. Roden was Fiji's flag bearer at the opening ceremonies.

Women

Athlete	Event	Group Matches			Quarterfinals	Semifinals	Final / BM	
Athlete	Event	Opposition Result	Opposition Result	Rank	Opposition Result	Opposition Result	Opposition Result	Rank
Merewalesi Roden	Singles class 5	Jung (KOR); L 0–3	Lundbäck (SWE); L 0–3	3	did not advance			

== See also ==
- Fiji at the 2016 Summer Olympics
