= Table tennis at the 2020 Summer Paralympics – Women's individual – Class 5 =

Table tennis at the XVI Paralympic Games
- Venue: Tokyo Metropolitan Gymnasium
- Dates: 25 – 29 August 2021
- Competitors: 9 from 7 nations

Medalists
1st place, gold medalist(s)		Zhang Bian	China
2nd place, silver medalist(s)		Pan Jiamin	China
3rd place, bronze medalist(s)		Jung Young-a	South Korea
3rd place, bronze medalist(s)		Khetam Abuawad	Jordan

The Women's individual table tennis – Class 5 tournament at the 2020 Summer Paralympics in Tokyo took place between 25 and 29 August 2021 at Tokyo Metropolitan Gymnasium.

In the preliminary stage, athletes competed in three groups of three. The winners and runners-up of each group qualified for the knock-out stage. In this edition of the Games, no bronze medal match was held. The losers of each semifinal were automatically awarded a bronze medal.

== Results ==
All times are local time in UTC+9.

=== Main bracket ===
==== Final rounds ====
Quarterfinals
B2	Panwas Sringam (THA)	12	9	5	7
C1	Jung Young-a (KOR)	10	11	11	11
C2	Pan Jiamin (CHN)	11	8	11	8	12
A2	Ingela Lundback (SWE)	7	11	7	11	10

Semifinals
A1	Zhang Bian (CHN)	11	11	11
C1	Jung Young-a (KOR) (bronze)	7	7	8
C2	Pan Jiamin (CHN)	11	9	11	11
B1	Khetam Abuawad (JOR) (bronze)	7	11	7	8

Gold medal match
A1	Zhang Bian (CHN) (gold)	12	5	11	13	11
C1	Pan Jiamin (CHN) (silver)	14	11	8	11	7

=== Preliminary round ===
Qualified for the knock-out stage

==== Group A ====
Seed	Athlete	Won	Lost	Points diff	Rank
1	Zhang Bian (CHN)	2	0	+33	1
5	Ingela Lundback (SWE)	1	1	+2	2
7	Faiza Mahmoud Mahmoud (EGY)	0	2	–35	3

Faiza Mahmoud Mahmoud (EGY)	5	9	3
Zhang Bian (CHN)	11	11	11

Ingela Lundback (SWE)	3	11	4	3
Zhang Bian (CHN)	11	5	11	11

Ingela Lundback (SWE)	11	11	11
Faiza Mahmoud Mahmoud (EGY)	5	6	3

==== Group B ====
Seed	Athlete	Won	Lost	Points diff	Rank
2	Khetam Abuawad (JOR)	1	1	+3	1
9	Panwas Sringam (THA)	1	1	0	2
6	Caroline Tabib (ISR)	1	1	–3	3

Panwas Sringam (THA)	9	7	9
Khetam Abuawad (JOR)	11	11	11

Caroline Tabib (ISR)	13	5	11	11
Khetam Abuawad (JOR)	11	11	5	8

Panwas Sringam (THA)	11	11	11
Caroline Tabib (ISR)	9	7	9

==== Group C ====
Seed	Athlete	Won	Lost	Points diff	Rank
4	Jung Young-a (KOR)	3	0	+29	1
3	Pan Jiamin (CHN)	2	1	+22	2
8	Tamara Leonelli (CHI)	1	2	–51	3

Tamara Leonelli (CHI)	2	3	4
Pan Jiamin (CHN)	11	11	11

Jung Young-a (KOR)	11	11	7	9	11
Pan Jiamin (CHN)	9	8	11	11	8

Jung Young-a (KOR)	11	11	11
Tamara Leonelli (CHI)	2	1	3
