= Table tennis at the 2016 Summer Paralympics – Women's individual – Class 5 =

Table tennis at the XV Paralympic Games
- Venue: Riocentro Pavilion 3
- Dates: 8–12 September 2016
- Competitors: 12 from 11 nations

Medalists
1st place, gold medalist(s)		Zhang Bian	China
2nd place, silver medalist(s)		Gu Gai	China
3rd place, bronze medalist(s)		Jung Young-a	South Korea

The women's individual table tennis – Class 5 tournament at the 2016 Summer Paralympics in Rio de Janeiro took place during 8–12 September 2016 at Riocentro Pavilion 3. Classes 1-5 were for athletes with a physical impairment that affected their legs, and who competed in a sitting position. The lower the number, the greater the impact the impairment was on an athlete’s ability to compete.

In the preliminary stage, athletes competed in four groups of three. Winners and runners-up of each group qualified for the quarterfinals.

== Results ==
All times are local time in UTC-3.

=== Finals ===
==== Main bracket ====
Quarterfinals
A1	Zhang Bian (CHN)	11	11	11
B2	Faith Chinenye Obiora (NGR)	2	1	4
D2	Ingela Lundbäck (SWE)	11	11	11
C1	Khetam Abuawad (JOR)	7	7	9
D1	Jung Young-a (KOR)	11	11	11
A2	Kimie Bessho (JPN)	8	8	3
C2	Caroline Tabib (ISR)	2	7	3
B1	Gu Gai (CHN)	11	11	11

Semifinals
A1	Zhang Bian (CHN)	11	9	11	11
D2	Ingela Lundbäck (SWE)	7	11	9	7
D1	Jung Young-a (KOR)	6	11	4	6
B1	Gu Gai (CHN)	11	9	11	11

Finals
A1	Zhang Bian (CHN)	11	11	11
B1	Gu Gai (CHN)	6	6	6

==== Bronze medal match ====
Bronze medal match
D2	Ingela Lundbäck (SWE)	9	15	12	9
D1	Jung Young-a (KOR)	11	17	10	11

=== Preliminary round ===
Qualified for the semifinals

==== Group A ====
Seed	Athlete	Won	Lost	Points diff	Rank
1	Zhang Bian (CHN)	2	0	+29	1 Q
7	Kimie Bessho (JPN)	1	1	-7	2 Q
10	Wong Pui Yi (HKG)	0	2	-22	3

Zhang Bian (CHN)	11	13	11
Wong Pui Yi (HKG)	5	11	6

Zhang Bian (CHN)	11	11	11
Kimie Bessho (JPN)	7	2	8

Kimie Bessho (JPN)	11	12	13
Wong Pui Yi (HKG)	6	10	11

==== Group B ====
Seed	Athlete	Won	Lost	Points diff	Rank
2	Gu Gai (CHN)	2	0	+36	1 Q
9	Faith Obiora (NGR)	1	1	-22	2 Q
8	Wei Mei-hui (TPE)	0	2	-14	3

Gu Gai (CHN)	11	11	11
Faith Obiora (NGR)	3	6	4

Gu Gai (CHN)	11	11	11
Wei Mei-hui (TPE)	5	6	6

Wei Mei-hui (TPE)	9	11	8	11	13
Faith Obiora (NGR)	11	6	11	7	15

==== Group C ====
Seed	Athlete	Won	Lost	Points diff	Rank
3	Khetam Abuawad (JOR)	2	0	+35	1 Q
6	Caroline Tabib (ISR)	1	1	+2	2 Q
11	Maria Paredes Albor (MEX)	0	1	-37	3

Khetam Abuawad (JOR)	11	11	11
Maria Paredes Albor (MEX)	5	1	2

Khetam Abuawad (JOR)	12	11	11
Caroline Tabib (ISR)	10	5	9

Caroline Tabib (ISR)	11	11	10	11
Maria Paredes Albor (MEX)	5	7	12	7

==== Group D ====
Seed	Athlete	Won	Lost	Points diff	Rank
4	Jung Young-a (KOR)	2	0	+35	1 Q
5	Ingela Lundbäck (SWE)	1	1	+6	2 Q
12	Merewalesi Roden (FIJ)	0	2	-41	3

Jung Young-a (KOR)	11	11	11
Merewalesi Roden (FIJ)	2	3	5

Jung Young-a (KOR)	11	11	11
Ingela Lundbäck (SWE)	5	8	8

Ingela Lundbäck (SWE)	11	11	11
Merewalesi Roden (FIJ)	4	6	5
