= Table tennis at the 2008 Summer Paralympics – Women's individual – Class 4 =

Women's Individual Class 4 at the XIII Paralympic Games
- Venue: Peking University Gymnasium
- Dates: 7 – 11 September 2008
- Competitors: 16 from 12 nations

Medalists
1st place, gold medalist(s)		Zhou Ying	China
2nd place, silver medalist(s)		Borislava Perić	Serbia
3rd place, bronze medalist(s)		Moon Sung Hye	South Korea

The Women's Individual Class 4 table tennis competition at the 2008 Summer Paralympics was held between 7 September and 11 September at the Peking University Gymnasium.

Classes 1-5 were for athletes with a physical impairment that affected their legs, who competed in a sitting position. The lower the number, the greater the impact the impairment was on an athlete’s ability to compete.

The event was won by Zhou Ying, representing China.

== Results ==
=== Preliminary round ===
Qualified for the knock-out stages

==== Group A ====
Rank	Competitor	MP	W	L	Points	SRB	JOR	SLO	POL
1	Borislava Perić (SRB)	3	3	0	9:2	x	3:2	3:0	3:0
2	Fatmeh Al-Azzam (JOR)	3	2	1	8:4	2:3	x	3:0	3:1
3	Andreja Dolinar (SLO)	3	1	2	3:8	0:3	0:3	x	3:2
4	Miroslawa Rozmiej (POL)	3	0	3	3:9	0:3	1:3	2:3	x

7 September, 12:00

Fatmeh Al-Azzam (JOR)	11	11	11
Andreja Dolinar (SLO)	1	9	7
Borislava Perić (SRB)	11	11	11
Miroslawa Rozmiej (POL)	1	9	8

7 September, 18:40

Fatmeh Al-Azzam (JOR)	7	11	11	11
Miroslawa Rozmiej (POL)	11	5	8	6
Borislava Perić (SRB)	11	11	11	
Andreja Dolinar (SLO)	6	5	8	

9 September, 10:40

Andreja Dolinar (SLO)	9	11	11	8	11
Miroslawa Rozmiej (POL)	11	5	5	11	6
Borislava Perić (SRB)	9	13	11	4	11
Fatmeh Al-Azzam (JOR)	11	11	3	11	3

==== Group B ====
Rank	Competitor	MP	W	L	Points	KOR	ITA	NGR	GBR
1	Moon Sung Hye (KOR)	3	3	0	9:0	x	3:0	3:0	3:0
2	Valeria Zorzetto (ITA)	3	2	1	6:5	0:3	x	3:1	3:1
3	Faith Chinenye Obiora (NGR)	3	1	2	4:7	0:3	1:3	x	3:1
4	Claire Robertson (GBR)	3	0	3	2:9	0:3	1:3	1:3	x

7 September, 12:00

Moon Sung-hye (KOR)	11	11	12	
Faith Chinenye Obiora (NGR)	2	8	10	
Valeria Zorzetto (ITA)	11	11	12	11
Claire Robertson (GBR)	4	4	14	6

7 September, 18:40

Moon Sung-hye (KOR)	11	11	11	
Claire Robertson (GBR)	7	5	5	
Valeria Zorzetto (ITA)	11	10	11	11
Faith Chinenye Obiora (NGR)	4	12	7	6

9 September, 10:40

Faith Chinenye Obiora (NGR)	11	11	6	11
Claire Robertson (GBR)	4	9	11	7
Moon Sung-hye (KOR)	11	11	11	
Valeria Zorzetto (ITA)	6	9	8	

==== Group C ====
Rank	Competitor	MP	W	L	Points	CHN	GBR	SRB	RSA
1	Zhou Ying (CHN)	3	3	0	9:1	x	3:1	3:0	3:0
2	Sue Gilroy (GBR)	3	2	1	7:4	1:3	x	3:1	3:0
3	Nada Matic (SRB)	3	1	2	4:6	0:3	1:3	x	3:0
4	Alisha Almeida (RSA)	3	0	3	0:9	0:3	0:3	0:3	x

7 September, 12:00

Sue Gilroy (GBR)	11	8	11	13
Nada Matic (SRB)	6	11	5	11
Zhou Ying (CHN)	11	11	11	
Alisha Almeida (RSA)	7	6	4	

7 September, 18:40

Sue Gilroy (GBR)	11	11	11
Alisha Almeida (RSA)	6	6	4
Zhou Ying (CHN)	11	11	11
Nada Matic (SRB)	9	8	8

9 September, 10:40

Nada Matic (SRB)	11	11	11	
Alisha Almeida (RSA)	9	6	4	
Zhou Ying (CHN)	11	11	11	12
Sue Gilroy (GBR)	3	13	7	10

==== Group D ====
Rank	Competitor	MP	W	L	Points	GER	KOR	ITA	MEX
1	Monika Sikora Weinmann (GER)	3	3	0	9:0	x	3:0	3:0	3:0
2	Jung Ji Nam (KOR)	3	2	1	6:5	0:3	x	3:1	3:1
3	Patrizia Saccà (ITA)	3	1	2	4:7	0:3	1:3	x	3:1
4	Teresa Arenales (MEX)	3	0	3	2:9	0:3	1:3	1:3	x

7 September, 12:00

Jung Ji-nam (KOR)	11	7	11	14
Patrizia Saccà (ITA)	6	11	5	12
Monika Sikora Weinmann (GER)	11	11	11	
Teresa Arenales (MEX)	8	4	8	

7 September, 18:40

Jung Ji-nam (KOR)	6	11	11	11
Teresa Arenales (MEX)	11	4	4	6
Monika Sikora Weinmann (GER)	11	11	11	
Patrizia Saccà (ITA)	4	9	7	

9 September, 10:40

Patrizia Saccà (ITA)	7	11	11	11
Teresa Arenales (MEX)	11	9	8	9
Monika Sikora Weinmann (GER)	17	11	11	
Jung Ji-nam (KOR)	15	3	9	

=== Competition bracket ===
Semifinals: 10 Sep 10:00
Borislava Perić (SRB)	7	11	10	11	11
Monika Sikora Weinmann (GER)	11	9	12	4	8
Zhou Ying (CHN)	11	11	11
Moon Sung-hye (KOR)	5	7	7

Gold medal match: 10 Sep 17:30
Borislava Perić (SRB)	8	8	9
Zhou Ying (CHN)	11	11	11
Bronze medal match: 10 Sep 17:30
Monika Sikora Weinmann (GER)	9	11	8	2
Moon Sung-hye (KOR)	11	3	11	11
