= Table tennis at the 2012 Summer Paralympics – Women's individual – Class 5 =

Table tennis Women's C5 at the XIV Paralympic Games
- Venue: ExCeL Exhibition Centre
- Dates: August 30-September 2, 2012
- Competitors: 12 from 10 nations

Medalists
1st place, gold medalist(s)		Zhang Bian	China
2nd place, silver medalist(s)		Gu Gai	China
3rd place, bronze medalist(s)		Ingela Lundbäck	Sweden

The women's individual table tennis – Class 5 tournament at the 2012 Summer Paralympics in London took place from 30 August to 2 September 2012 at ExCeL Exhibition Centre. Classes 1-5 were for athletes with a physical impairment that affected their legs, and who competed in a sitting position. The lower the number, the greater the impact the impairment was on an athlete’s ability to compete.

In the preliminary stage, athletes competed in four groups of three. Winners of each group qualified for the semi-finals.

== Results ==
All times are local (BST/UTC+1)

=== Finals ===
Semifinals: 1 Sep 16:45
A1	Gu Gai (CHN)	11	4	11	11
C1	Khetam Abuawad (JOR)	9	11	5	5
D1	Ingela Lundback (SWE)	6	4	10
B1	Zhang Bian (CHN)	11	11	12

Gold-medal match: 2 Sep 19:30
A1	Gu Gai (CHN)	5	7	12	7
B1	Zhang Bian (CHN)	11	11	10	11
Bronze-medal match
C1	Khetam Abuawad (JOR)	11	11	9	9	10
D1	Ingela Lundback (SWE)	7	8	11	11	12

=== Preliminary round ===
Qualified for the semifinals

==== Group A ====
Athlete	Won	Lost	Games won	Points diff
Gu Gai (CHN)	2	0	6	+27
Wei Mei-hui (TPE)	1	1	3	0
Maria Nardelli (ITA)	0	2	0	-27

30 August, 17:20

Gu Gai (CHN)	11	11	11
Maria Nardelli (ITA)	5	7	6

31 August, 13:00

Maria Nardelli (ITA)	7	8	6
Wei Mei-hui (TPE)	11	11	11

1 September, 09:00

Gu Gai (CHN)	11	11	11
Wei Mei-hui (TPE)	5	8	8

==== Group B ====
Athlete	Won	Lost	Games won	Points diff
Zhang Bian (CHN)	2	0	6	+35
Jung Young-a (KOR)	1	1	5	+12
Maria Passos (BRA)	0	2	0	-47

30 August, 17:20

Zhang Bian (CHN)	11	11	11
Maria Passos (BRA)	4	1	2

31 August, 13:00

Maria Passos (BRA)	3	6	3
Jung Young-a (KOR)	11	11	11

1 September, 09:00

Zhang Bian (CHN)	11	9	5	11	11
Jung Young-a (KOR)	5	11	11	4	7

==== Group C ====
Athlete	Won	Lost	Games won	Points diff
Khetam Abuawad (JOR)	2	0	6	+34
Kimie Bessho (JPN)	1	1	3	+6
Marta Makishi (ARG)	0	2	0	-40

30 August, 18:00

Khetam Abuawad (JOR)	11	11	11
Marta Makishi (ARG)	6	2	3

31 August, 13:00

Marta Makishi (ARG)	5	1	9
Kimie Bessho (JPN)	11	11	11

1 September, 09:00

Khetam Abuawad (JOR)	11	11	11
Kimie Bessho (JPN)	6	9	6

==== Group D ====
Athlete	Won	Lost	Games won	Points diff
Ingela Lundback (SWE)	2	0	6	+19
Hsiao Shu-chin (TPE)	1	1	5	-6
Wong Pui Yi (HKG)	0	2	4	-13

30 August, 18:00

Ingela Lundback (SWE)	11	7	11	10	11
Hsiao Shu-chin (TPE)	5	11	9	12	3

31 August, 13:00

Hsiao Shu-chin (TPE)	12	9	8	15	11
Wong Pui Yi (HKG)	10	11	11	13	6

1 September, 09:00

Ingela Lundback (SWE)	11	9	9	11	11
Wong Pui Yi (HKG)	7	11	11	9	4
