= Table tennis at the 2012 Summer Paralympics – Women's team – Class 4–5 =

Table tennis Women's C4-5 at the XIV Paralympic Games
- Venue: ExCeL Exhibition Centre
- Dates: 5 September – 8 September 2012
- Competitors: 8 from 5 nations

Medalists
1st place, gold medalist(s)		Gu Gai; Zhang Bian; Zhang Miao; Zhou Ying	China
2nd place, silver medalist(s)		Anna-Carin Ahlquist; Ingela Lundbäck	Sweden
3rd place, bronze medalist(s)		Jung Ji Nam; Jung Young-A; Moon Sung Hye	South Korea

The women's team class 4-5 table tennis event was part of the table tennis programme at the 2012 Summer Paralympics in London. The event took place from Wednesday 5 September to Friday 8 September.

== Bracket ==
The draw for team events took place on 28 August 2012.

First Round
1
16
9	Italy (ITA)	3
8	Chinese Taipei (TPE)	2
5
12
13
4
3
14
11
6
7
10
15
2

Quarterfinals
1	China (CHN)	3
9	Italy (ITA)	0
5	Brazil (BRA)	0
4	Serbia (SRB)	3
3	South Korea (KOR)	3
6	Slovenia (SLO)	0
7	Jordan (JOR)	0
2	Sweden (SWE)	3

Semifinals
1	China (CHN)	3
4	Serbia (SRB)	0
3	South Korea (KOR)	1
2	Sweden (SWE)	3

Gold Medal Match
1	China (CHN)	3
2	Sweden (SWE)	0
Bronze Medal Match
4	Serbia (SRB)	1
3	South Korea (KOR)	3

== Results ==
=== First round ===
5 September 2012; 09:00	Italy	3–2	Chinese Taipei

Report	Individual matches
Maria Nardelli	0–3	Wei Mei-hui	3–11, 4–11, 10–12
Valeria Zorzetto	3–1	Hsiao Shu-chin	11–8, 11–9, 5–11, 11–5
Valeria Zorzetto	3–2	Wei Mei-hui	11–3, 7–11, 11–9, 7–11, 11–8
Maria Nardelli	0–3	Hsiao Shu-chin	1–11, 6–11, 9–11
Maria Nardelli / Valeria Zorzetto	3–1	Wei Mei-hui / Hsiao Shu-chin	7–11, 11–4, 11–7, 12–10

=== Quarter-finals ===
5 September 2012; 19:00	China	3–0	Italy

Report	Individual matches
Zhang Bian	3–0	Maria Nardelli	11–8, 11–7, 11–8
Gu Gai	3–0	Valeria Zorzetto	12–10, 11–8, 11–3
Zhang Bian	3–0	Valeria Zorzetto	11–5, 11–3, 11–5

5 September 2012; 19:00	Brazil	0–3	Serbia

Report	Individual matches
Joyce Oliveira	0–3	Nada Matic	6–11, 9–11, 8–11
Maria Passos	0–3	Peric-Rankovic Borislava	5–11, 4–11, 4–11
Joyce Oliveira	0–3	Peric-Rankovic Borislava	14–16, 4–11, 3–11

5 September 2012; 19:00	South Korea	3–0	Slovenia

Report	Individual matches
Moon Sung Hye	3–0	Mateja Pintar	11–6, 11–4, 11–5
Jung Young-a	3–0	Andreja Dolinar	11–8, 11–2, 11–4
Moon Sung Hye	3–0	Andreja Dolinar	11–6, 11–6, 11–7

5 September 2012; 19:00	Jordan	0–3	Sweden

Report	Individual matches
Khetam Abuawad	2–3	Ingela Lundbäck	7–11, 11–5, 1–11, 11–9, 5–11
Al-Azzam Fatmeh	0–3	Anna-Carin Ahlquist	14–16, 7–11, 5–11
Khetam Abuawad	2–3	Anna-Carin Ahlquist	9–11, 11–8, 11–4, 5–11, 9–11

=== Semi-finals ===
7 September 2012; 10:00	China	3–0	Serbia

Report	Individual matches
Zhang Bian	3–0	Nada Matić	12–10, 11–6, 11–7
Zhou Ying	3–0	Borislava Perić	11–8, 11–9, 11–4
Zhang Bian	3–1	Borislava Perić	11–7, 11–7, 12–14, 11–3

7 September 2012; 10:00	South Korea	1–3	Sweden

Report	Individual matches
Jung-Young-a	1–3	Anna-Carin Ahlquist	9–11, 11–5, 9–11, 6–11
Moon Sung Hye	3–0	Ingela Lundbäck	11–6, 11–9, 11–9
Moon Sung Hye	2–3	Anna-Carin Ahlquist	10–12, 11–7, 11–9, 7–11, 6–11
Jung-Young-a	1–3	Ingela Lundbäck	11–8, 8–11, 7–11, 4–11

=== Finals ===
Gold medal match

8 September 2012; 16:30	China	3–0	Sweden

Report	Individual matches
Zhang Bian	3–2	Anna-Carin Ahlquist	7–11, 10–12, 11–8, 11–4, 11–6
Gu Gai	3–0	Ingela Lundbäck	11–5, 11–6, 11–5
Zhang Bian	3–0	Ingela Lundbäck	13–11, 11–4, 11–3

Bronze medal match

8 September 2012; 16:30	Serbia	1–3	South Korea

Report	Individual matches
Nada Matić	1–3	Moon Sung Hye	4–11, 13–11, 2–11, 5–11
Borislava Perić	1–3	Jung Young A	11–4, 6–11, 4–11, 9–11
Borislava Perić	3–1	Moon Sung Hye	11–9, 5–11, 11–6, 12–10
Nada Matić	1–3	Jung Young A	17–15, 13–15, 9–11, 7–11

== See also ==
- Table tennis at the 2012 Summer Paralympics
