= Israel at the 2016 Summer Paralympics =

- IPC code: ISR
- NPC: Israel Paralympic Committee
- Website: www.isad.org.il

in Rio de Janeiro
- Competitors: 33 in 11 sports
- Flag bearer: Shraga Weinberg
- Medals Ranked 74th: Gold 0 Silver 0 Bronze 3 Total 3

Summer Paralympics appearances (overview)
- 1960; 1964; 1968; 1972; 1976; 1980; 1984; 1988; 1992; 1996; 2000; 2004; 2008; 2012; 2016; 2020; 2024

Israel competed at the 2016 Summer Paralympics in Rio de Janeiro, Brazil, from 7 to 18 September 2016. They are scheduled to compete in sailing, cycling, shooting, and rowing.

== Disability classifications ==
Every participant at the Paralympics has their disability grouped into one of five disability categories; amputation, the condition may be congenital or sustained through injury or illness; cerebral palsy; wheelchair athletes, there is often overlap between this and other categories; visual impairment, including blindness; Les autres, any physical disability that does not fall strictly under one of the other categories, for example dwarfism or multiple sclerosis. Each Paralympic sport then has its own classifications, dependent upon the specific physical demands of competition. Events are given a code, made of numbers and letters, describing the type of event and classification of the athletes competing. Some sports, such as athletics, divide athletes by both the category and severity of their disabilities, other sports, for example swimming, group competitors from different categories together, the only separation being based on the severity of the disability.

== Medalists ==
Medal	Name	Sport	Event	Date
Bronze	Moran Samuel	Rowing	Women's single sculls	11 September
Bronze	Doron Shaziri	Shooting	Men's 50m Rifle 3 Positions SH1	12 September
Bronze	Inbal Pezaro	Swimming	200m individual medley SM5	15 September

== Athletics ==
Men's Track and Road Events

Athlete	Event	Final	
Athlete	Event	Result	Rank
Gad Yarkoni	Marathon T12	DSQ	

== Boccia ==
Israel qualified one boccia player for the mixed Individual BC2 into the Paralympic tournament. Nadav Levi claimed his Olympic spot as one of top 12 individual eligible boccia player in the BISFed 2016 World Rankings as of 30 April 2016.

Individual

Athlete	Event	Preliminaries			Round of 16	Quarterfinals	Semifinals	Final/BM	Rank
Athlete	Event	Opposition Score	Opposition Score	Rank	Opposition Score	Opposition Score	Opposition Score	Opposition Score	Rank
Nadav Levi	Mixed individual BC2	Desilva-Andrade (BER); W 3-2	Sohn (KOR); L 2-5	2	did not advance				

== Cycling ==
With one pathway for qualification being one highest ranked NPCs on the UCI Para-Cycling male and female Nations Ranking Lists on 31 December 2014, Israel qualified for the 2016 Summer Paralympics in Rio, assuming they continued to meet all other eligibility requirements.

=== Road ===
Men

Athlete	Event	Time	Rank
Koby Lion	Road Race H1	1:45:24	8
Koby Lion	Time Trial H2	36:50.45	6

== Goalball ==
Israel's women enter the tournament ranked 10th in the world.

The following is the Israel roster in the women's goalball tournament of the 2016 Summer Paralympics.

No.	Player	Class	Date of birth (age)
1	Elham Mahamid	B3	16 February 1990 (aged 26)
2	Yarden Adika	B3	14 July 1999 (aged 17)
3	Gal Hamrani	B1	1 December 1992 (aged 23)
5	Roni Ohayon	B2	8 March 1999 (aged 17)
6	Lihi Ben-David	B1	8 December 1995 (aged 20)
9	Sivan Abravaya	B2	13 August 1990 (aged 26)

Pos	Team	Pld	W	D	L	GF	GA	GD	Pts	Qualification
1	Brazil (H)	4	3	0	1	25	7	+18	9	Quarter-finals
2	United States	4	3	0	1	25	13	+12	9	Quarter-finals
3	Japan	4	2	1	1	13	8	+5	7	Quarter-finals
4	Israel	4	1	1	2	16	15	+1	4	Quarter-finals
5	Algeria	4	0	0	4	1	37	−36	0	

Source: Paralympic.org
(H) Hosts

8 September 2016; 14:30	Japan	1–1	Israel	Future Arena, Rio de Janeiro; Referees: Alexander Knecht (GER), Vilma Basinkaite (LTU)
8 September 2016; 14:30	Wakasugi 1	Report	Mahamid 1	Future Arena, Rio de Janeiro; Referees: Alexander Knecht (GER), Vilma Basinkaite (LTU)

10 September 2016; 18:45	Israel	10–0 (walkover)	Algeria

12 September 2016; 10:15	Brazil	7–2	Israel	Future Arena, Rio de Janeiro; Referees: Yoshinori Nii (JPN), Raquel Aguado (ESP)
12 September 2016; 10:15	Amorim 4 Custodio 3	Report	Mahamid 2	Future Arena, Rio de Janeiro; Referees: Yoshinori Nii (JPN), Raquel Aguado (ESP)

13 September 2016; 09:00	Israel	3–7	United States	Future Arena, Rio de Janeiro; Referees: Raquel Aguado (ESP), Dawna Christy (CAN)
13 September 2016; 09:00	Ben-David 3	Report	Miller 4 Czechowski 2 Dennis 1	Future Arena, Rio de Janeiro; Referees: Raquel Aguado (ESP), Dawna Christy (CAN)

Quarter-final

14 September 2016; 15:45	Turkey	15–5	Israel	Future Arena, Rio de Janeiro; Referees: Dawna Christy (CAN), Raquel Aguado (ESP)
14 September 2016; 15:45	Altunoluk 7 Özcan 4 Mercan 3 Ben-David 1 (o.g.)	Report	Ben-David 5	Future Arena, Rio de Janeiro; Referees: Dawna Christy (CAN), Raquel Aguado (ESP)

== Paracanoe ==
Israel earned a qualifying spot at the 2016 Summer Paralympics in this sport following their performance at the 2015 ICF Canoe Sprint & Paracanoe World Championships in Milan, Italy. Pascale Bercovitch who competed in 2008 in the sport of rowing and in 2012 in the sport of hand-cycling earned the spot for Israel. This marked the first time Israel sent a sprint canoeist to the Paralympics.

Athlete	Event	Heats		Semifinal		Final	
Athlete	Event	Time	Rank	Time	Rank	Time	Rank
Pascale Bercovitch	Women's KL2	1:01.713	3 SF	1:02.251	3 FA	1:01.131	8

== Rowing ==
One pathway for qualifying for Rio involved having a boat have top eight finish at the 2015 FISA World Rowing Championships in a medal event. Israel qualified for the 2016 Games under this criterion in the AS Women's Single Sculls event with a first-place finish by Moran Samuel in a time of 05:25.920. They qualified a second boat in the TA Mixed Double Sculls event with an eighth-place finish by Tsofnat Levanon, Barak Hazor, Nissim Nir Mayo, Shay-Lee Shulmit Mizrachi and cox Danielle Renny Palatin in a time of 04:12.140. Samuel bases her training in Italy where she is coached by Paula Grizzetti. She also trains in Israel at the Daniel Rowing Center in Tel Aviv.

Athlete	Event	Heats		Repechage		Final	
Athlete	Event	Time	Rank	Time	Rank	Time	Rank
Moran Samuel	Women's Single Sculls	5:21.36	2 R	5:22.96	1 Q	5:17.46	(bronze)
Reuven Magnagey; Yuliya Chernoy	Mixed Double Sculls	4:20.62	5 R	4:28.60	4 Final B	4:21.23	3 Final B

== Sailing ==
One pathway for qualifying for Rio involved having a boat have top seven finish at the 2015 Combined World Championships in a medal event where the country had nor already qualified through via the 2014 IFDS Sailing World Championships. Israel qualified for the 2016 Games under this criterion in the Sonar event with a fourth-place finish overall and the first country who had not qualified via the 2014 Championships. They qualified a second boat in the SKUD 18 event with a sixteenth-place finish overall and the sixth country who had not qualified via the 2014 Championships. The boat was crewed by Hagar Zahavi and Moshe Zahavi.

Athlete	Event	Race											Net points	Rank
Athlete	Event	1	2	3	4	5	6	7	8	9	10	11	Net points	Rank
Moshe Zahavi; Hagar Zahavi	SKUD 18	~~DNF~~	9	11	10	10	UFD	10	UFD	10	10	10	104	11
Dror Cohen; Arnon Efrati; Shimon Ben Yakov	Sonar	12	4	4	11	5	7	2	5	~~13~~	5	4	59	8

== Shooting ==
The first opportunity to qualify for shooting at the Rio Games took place at the 2014 IPC Shooting World Championships in Suhl. Shooters earned spots for their NPC. Israel earned a qualifying spot at this event in the R5 – 10m Air Rifle Mixed Prone SH2 event as a result of the performance Doron Shaziri. It was the only qualification spot Israel earned at the event.

Athlete	Event	Qualification		Final	
Athlete	Event	Score	Rank	Score	Rank
Doron Shaziri	Men's 50m Rifle 3 Positions SH1	1153	4 Q	437.5	3rd place, bronze medalist(s)
Doron Shaziri	Mixed 50m Rifle Prone SH1	614.8	9	did not advance	

== Swimming ==
Qualifiers for the latter rounds (Q) of all events were decided on a time only basis, therefore positions shown are overall results versus competitors in all heats.

Men

Athletes	Event	Heat		Final	
Athletes	Event	Time	Rank	Time	Rank
Itzhak Mamistvalov	200m freestyle S2	5:20.43	7 Q	5:09.96	7
Iyad Shalabi	50m backstroke S2	1:16.97	11	did not advance	
Iyad Shalabi	100m backstroke S2	DSQ		did not advance	
Iyad Shalabi	200m freestyle S2	5:24.07	8 Q	5:22.38	8
Yoav Valinsky	100m freestyle S6	1:14.59	15	did not advance	
Yoav Valinsky	100m backstroke S6	1:32.37	12	did not advance	
Yoav Valinsky	100m breaststroke SB6	1:34.36	10	did not advance	
Yoav Valinsky	200m individual medley SM6	2:57.68	6 Q	2:59.08	7

Women

Athletes	Event	Heat		Final	
Athletes	Event	Time	Rank	Time	Rank
Inbal Pezaro	50m freestyle S5	40.82	5 Q	39.73	6
Inbal Pezaro	100m freestyle S5	1:24.38	3 Q	1:24.04	5
Inbal Pezaro	200m freestyle S5	3:03.35	4 Q	3:03.29	5
Inbal Pezaro	100m breaststroke SB4	1:57.28	4 Q	2:01.02	6
Inbal Pezaro	200m individual medley SM5	3:37.62	2 Q	3:38.20	3rd place, bronze medalist(s)
Erel Halevi	50m freestyle S7	38.41	11	did not advance	
Erel Halevi	100m freestyle S7	1:21.56	10	did not advance	
Erel Halevi	400m freestyle S7	—N/a		5:51.05	8
Yulia Gordiychuk	100m freestyle S9	1:10.51	20	did not advance	
Yulia Gordiychuk	400m freestyle S9	5:13.02	13	did not advance	
Yulia Gordiychuk	200m individual medley SM9	2:57.22	19	did not advance	
Veronika Guirenko	50m backstroke S3	1:30.97	13	did not advance	
Veronika Guirenko	100m freestyle S3	2:59.28	13	did not advance	

Mixed

Athletes	Event	Heat		Final	
Athletes	Event	Time	Rank	Time	Rank
Inbal Pezaro; Erel Halevi; Iyad Shalabi; Yoav Valinsky	4 × 50m freestyle relay 20 pts	3:10.00	7 Q	DSQ	

== Table tennis ==
Men's singles

Athlete	Event	Preliminaries			Quarterfinals	Semifinals	Final/BM	Rank
Athlete	Event	Opposition Result	Opposition Result	Rank	Opposition Result	Opposition Result	Opposition Result	Rank
Shay Siada	Singles class 4	Ozturk (TUR); L 0-3	Guo (CHN); L 0-3	3	did not advance			
Danny Bobrov	Singles class 6	Thainiyom (THA); L 0-3	Jensen (DEN); L 1-3	3	did not advance			

Women's singles

Athlete	Event	Preliminaries			Quarterfinals	Semifinals	Final/BM	Rank
Athlete	Event	Opposition Result	Opposition Result	Rank	Opposition Result	Opposition Result	Opposition Result	Rank
Chagit Brill	Singles class 1-2	Rossi (ITA); L 0-3	Bootwansirina (THA); L 1-3	3	did not advance			
Caroline Tabib	Singles class 5	Abuawad (JOR); L 0-3	Paredes Albor (MEX); W 3-1	2 Q	Gu (CHN); L 0-3	did not advance		5

Teams

Athlete	Event	Round of 16	Quarterfinals	Semifinals	Final/BM	Rank
Athlete	Event	Opposition Result	Opposition Result	Opposition Result	Opposition Result	Rank
Chagit Brill; Caroline Tabib	Women's team class 4-5	Altıntaş, Duman (TUR); L 0-2	did not advance			9

== Wheelchair tennis ==
Israel qualified one competitors in the men's single event, Adam Berdichevski. Israel earned two spots in the quad singles event, with the spots going to Itay Erenlib and Shraga Weinberg.

Athlete	Event	Round of 64	Round of 32	Round of 16	Quarterfinals	Semifinals	Final/BM	Rank
Athlete	Event	Opposition Result	Opposition Result	Opposition Result	Opposition Result	Opposition Result	Opposition Result	Rank
Adam Berdichevsky	Men's Singles	Saida (JPN); L 1–6, 2-6	did not advance					33
Itai Erenlib	Quad Singles	—N/a		Wagner (USA); L 4–6, 4-6	did not advance			9
Shraga Weinberg	Quad Singles	—N/a		Alcott (AUS); L 0–6, 0-6	did not advance			9
Itai Erenlib; Shraga Weinberg	Quad Doubles	—N/a			Oliveira, Silva (BRA); W 6–0, 6-0	Taylor, Wagner (USA); L 4–6, 2-6	Burdekin, Lapthorne (GBR); L 6–3, 4–6, 6-7^{(2-7)}	4
