= Fiji at the 2024 Summer Paralympics =

2024 sporting event delegation in Paris

- Flag of Fiji
- IPC code: FIJ
- NPC: Fiji Paralympic Association

in Paris, France August 28, 2024 – September 8, 2024
- Competitors: 3 (0 men and 3 women) in 2 sports
- Flag bearer: Irene Mar
- Medals: Gold 0 Silver 0 Bronze 0 Total 0

Summer Paralympics appearances (overview)
- 1964; 1968–1972; 1976; 1980–1992; 1996; 2000; 2004; 2008; 2012; 2016; 2020; 2024

Fiji competed at the 2024 Summer Paralympics in Paris, France, from 28 August to 8 September 2024.

== Competitors ==
The following is the list of number of competitors in the Games, including game-eligible alternates in team sports.

Sport	Men	Women	Total
Athletics	0	2	2
Taekwondo	0	1	1
Total	0	3	3

== Athletics ==
Key

- Note–Ranks given for track events are within the athlete's heat only
- Q = Qualified for the next round
- q = Qualified for the next round as a fastest loser or, in field events, by position without achieving the qualifying target
- DQ = Disqualified
- PR = Paralympic Record
- AR = Area (or continental) Record
- NR = National Record
- SB = Season's Best
- N/A = Round not applicable for the event
- Bye = Athlete not required to compete in round

Field events
Women

Athlete	Event	Final	
Athlete	Event	Result	Rank
Selina Seau	Women's shot put F64	7.68	14
Naibili Vatunisolo	Women's shot put F64	9.19	12

== Taekwondo ==
Athlete	Event	First round	Quarterfinals	Semifinals	Repechage	Final / BM	
Athlete	Event	Opposition Result	Opposition Result	Opposition Result	Opposition Result	Opposition Result	Rank
Irene Mar	Women's −57 kg	Lypetska (UKR); W 25–3	Gürdal (TUR); L 5–29	—N/a	Dosmalova (KAZ); L 6–12	Did not advance	7

== See also ==
- Fiji at the 2024 Summer Olympics
- Fiji at the Paralympics
