= Table tennis at the 2004 Summer Paralympics – Women's individual – Class 4 =

Table Tennis - Women's Singles 4 at the XII Paralympic Games
- Paralympic Table Tennis
- Venue: Galatsi Olympic Hall
- Dates: 18–21 September 2004
- Competitors: 11 from 10 nations

Medalists
1st place, gold medalist(s)		Monika Sikora Weinmann	Germany
2nd place, silver medalist(s)		Valeria Zorzetto	Italy
3rd place, bronze medalist(s)		Christiane Pape	Germany

The Women's Singles 4 table tennis competition at the 2004 Summer Paralympics was held from 18 to 21 September at the Galatsi Olympic Hall.

Classes 1-5 were for athletes with a physical impairment that affected their legs, who competed in a sitting position. The lower the number, the greater the impact the impairment was on an athlete’s ability to compete.

The event was won by Monika Sikora Weinmann, representing Germany.

== Results ==
=== Preliminaries ===
Qualified for final round

==== Group A ====
Rank	Competitor	MP	W	L	Points	GER	JOR	GBR
1	Monika Sikora Weinmann (GER)	2	2	0	6:4	x	3:2	3:2
2	Fatemah Al Azzam (JOR)	2	1	1	5:4	2:3	x	3:1
3	Sue Gilroy (GBR)	2	0	2	3:6	2:3	1:3	x

==== Group B ====
Rank	Competitor	MP	W	L	Points	ITA	SLO	MEX	USA
1	Valeria Zorzetto (ITA)	3	3	0	9:2	x	3:1	3:1	3:0
2	Andreja Dolinar (SLO)	3	2	1	7:5	1:3	x	3:2	3:0
3	Marie Teresa Arenales (MEX)	3	1	2	6:6	1:3	2:3	x	3:0
4	Jennifer Johnson (USA)	3	0	3	0:9	0:3	0:3	0:3	x

==== Group C ====
Rank	Competitor	MP	W	L	Points	GER	SUI	SVK	RSA
1	Christiane Pape (GER)	3	2	1	8:4	x	2:3	3:0	3:1
2	Alice Rast (SUI)	3	2	1	8:6	3:2	x	2:3	3:1
3	Maria Pillarova (SVK)	3	2	1	6:5	0:3	3:2	x	3:0
4	Rosabelle Riese (RSA)	3	0	3	2:9	1:3	1:3	0:3	x

=== Competition bracket ===
Quarterfinals
Andreja Dolinar (SLO)	1
Alice Rast (SUI)	3
Christiane Pape (GER)	3
Fatemah Al Azzam (JOR)	0

Semifinals
Monika Sikora Weinmann (GER)	3
Alice Rast (SUI)	0
Christiane Pape (GER)	2
Valeria Zorzetto (ITA)	3

Finals
Monika Sikora Weinmann (GER)	3
Valeria Zorzetto (ITA)	1
Third place
Alice Rast (SUI)	1
Christiane Pape (GER)	3
