= Athletics at the 2008 Summer Paralympics – Men's 100 metres T12 =

The Men's 100m T12 had its first round held on September 8, beginning at 10:35. The Semifinals were held on September 9, at 10:25 and the A and B Finals were held on September 10 at 17:35.

== Medalists ==
Gold	Josiah Jamison; United States
Silver	Adekunle Adesoji; Nigeria
Bronze	Yuqing Yang; China

== Results ==
Place	Athlete	Round 1	Semifinals	Final B	Final A
1	Josiah Jamison (USA)	11.09 Q	10.90 Q	—	10.89
2	Adekunle Adesoji (NGR)	11.05 Q	11.00 Q	—	10.95
3	Yuqing Yang (CHN)	11.11 Q	10.95 Q	—	10.96
4	Li Qiang (CHN)	11.23 q	11.10 Q	—	11.02
5	Fedor Trikolich (RUS)	11.27 q	11.17 q	11.18	
6	Elchin Muradov (AZE)	11.35 Q	11.22 q	11.19	
7	Matthias Schroder (GER)	11.18 Q	11.17 q	11.23	
8	Julio Roque (CUB)	11.19 q	11.13 q	30.91	
9	Mateusz Michalski (POL)	11.20 q	11.31		
10	Ali Ganfoudi (TUN)	11.60 Q	11.40		
11	Ahmed Belhaj Ali (TUN)	11.48 Q	11.42		
12	Julio Cesar Souza (BRA)	11.46 q	11.45		
13	Ricardo Santana (VEN)	11.50			
13	Maximiliano Rodríguez (ESP)	11.50			
15	Nemanja Savkovic (SRB)	11.53			
16	Yoldani Silva (VEN)	11.65			
17	Goran Zezelj (CRO)	11.66			
18	Joaquim Manuel (ANG)	11.67			
18	Federico Rodriguez (ARG)	11.67			
20	Pasquale Gallo (FRA)	11.72			
21	Dimitrios Axiotis (GRE)	11.79			
22	Pedro Cesar Moraes (BRA)	11.84			
23	Ranjesh Prakash (FIJ)	12.38			
24	Richard Souci (MRI)	12.64			
25	Abdul Quader Suman (BAN)	16.63			
