= Fiji at the 2020 Summer Paralympics =

- Flag of Fiji
- IPC code: FIJ
- NPC: Fiji Paralympic Association

in Tokyo, Japan August 24, 2021 – September 5, 2021
- Competitors: 2 (2 men) in 1 sport and 3 events
- Flag bearer: Iosefo Rakesa
- Medals: Gold 0 Silver 0 Bronze 0 Total 0

Summer Paralympics appearances (overview)
- 1964; 1968–1972; 1976; 1980–1992; 1996; 2000; 2004; 2008; 2012; 2016; 2020; 2024

Fiji competed at the 2020 Summer Paralympics in Tokyo, Japan, which took place from 24 August to 5 September 2021. This was their ninth appearance at the Summer Paralympics. The Fijian team consists of 2 athletes competing in 1 sport.

== Competitors ==
The following is the list of number of competitors participating in the Games.

Sport	Men	Women	Total
Athletics	2	0	2
Total	2	0	2

== Athletics ==
Field

Athlete	Event	Final	
Athlete	Event	Result	Rank
Inosi Matea Bulimairewa	Men's javelin throw F64	42.55 PB	10
Iosefo Rakesa	Men's shot put F41	Did not start	

== See also ==
- Fiji at the Paralympics
- Fiji at the 2020 Summer Olympics
