= Fiji at the 2008 Summer Paralympics =

- IPC code: FIJ
- NPC: Fiji Paralympic Association

in Beijing
- Competitors: 1 in 1 sport
- Flag bearer: Ranjesh Prakash
- Medals: Gold 0 Silver 0 Bronze 0 Total 0

Summer Paralympics appearances (overview)
- 1964; 1968–1972; 1976; 1980–1992; 1996; 2000; 2004; 2008; 2012; 2016; 2020; 2024

Fiji competed at the 2008 Summer Paralympics in Beijing, China. The country's delegation consisted of a single athlete, visually impaired sprinter Ranjesh Prakash, who competed in two events in athletics. Prakash was also his country's flagbearer during the Games' opening ceremony.

High jumper Iliesa Delana was initially reported in May 2007 as having qualified for the Games, but it was later reported that he had "fallen short during trials".

== Athletics ==
Athlete	Class	Event	Heats		Semifinal		Final	
Athlete	Class	Event	Result	Rank	Result	Rank	Result	Rank
Ranjesh Prakash	T12	Men's 100m	12.38	23	did not advance			
Ranjesh Prakash	T12	Men's 200m	DNS		did not advance			

== See also ==
- Fiji at the 2008 Summer Olympics
