= Fiji at the 2012 Summer Paralympics =

- IPC code: FIJ
- NPC: Fiji Paralympic Association

in London
- Competitors: 1 in 1 sport
- Flag bearer: Iliesa Delana
- Medals Ranked 52nd: Gold 1 Silver 0 Bronze 0 Total 1

Summer Paralympics appearances (overview)
- 1964; 1968–1972; 1976; 1980–1992; 1996; 2000; 2004; 2008; 2012; 2016; 2020; 2024

Fiji participated in the 2012 Summer Paralympics in London, United Kingdom, from August 29 to September 9.

Two Fijians qualified for track and field events: Iliesa Delana and Lusiana Rogoimuri. Following Rogoimuri's withdrawal due to an accident prior to the Games, however, Delana was Fiji's sole athlete in London. He was also Fiji's flag-bearer during the Games' opening ceremony.

Delana won the gold in the men's high jump F42, giving Fiji its first ever Paralympic or Olympic medal. It was only the second ever Paralympic medal (and the first gold) won by an athlete from a Pacific Island nation, following Francis Kompaon's silver in sprinting for Papua New Guinea in 2008.

== Medallists ==
Medal	Name	Sport	Event	Date
Gold	Iliesa Delana	Athletics	Men's High Jump F42	3 September

== Athletics ==
Iliesa Delana, a left leg amputee, qualified to compete in the men's high jump, F42 category (for lower limb amputees). Delana was the opening ceremonies flag bearer for Fiji. He had emerged as the "world number two" in his sport and category during qualifiers, giving his country hopes for its first ever Paralympic medal. He won gold, with a jump of 1.74 metres, an Oceania regional record. Girisha Hosanagara Nagarajegowda of India and Lukasz Mamczarz of Poland also cleared 1.74 metres, but while Delana cleared both 1.71m and 1.74m on his first attempt, Nagarajegowda took two attempts on 1.71, while Mamczarz only cleared 1.74 on his third attempt.

Lusiana Rogoimuri qualified (B standard) to compete in the women's 100m and 200m, T36 category; she has cerebral palsy. On 1 August, however, less than a month before the Games, she was "rushed to hospital" in a "critical condition" after a car accident. She was discharged from the hospital on 21 August, but ordered to rest, and had to withdraw from the Games.

=== Men’s field events ===
Athlete	Event	Height	Rank
Iliesa Delana	High Jump F42	1.74 OC	1st place, gold medalist(s)

== See also ==
- Summer Paralympic disability classification
- Fiji at the Paralympics
- Fiji at the 2012 Summer Olympics
