= Merewalesi =

Merewalesi is a Fijian feminine given name. Notable people with the name include:

- Merewalesi Roden (born 1967), Fijian Paralympic table tennis player
- Merewalesi Rokouono (born 1994), Fijian rugby player
