= Khetam Abuawad =

Jordanian para table tennis player

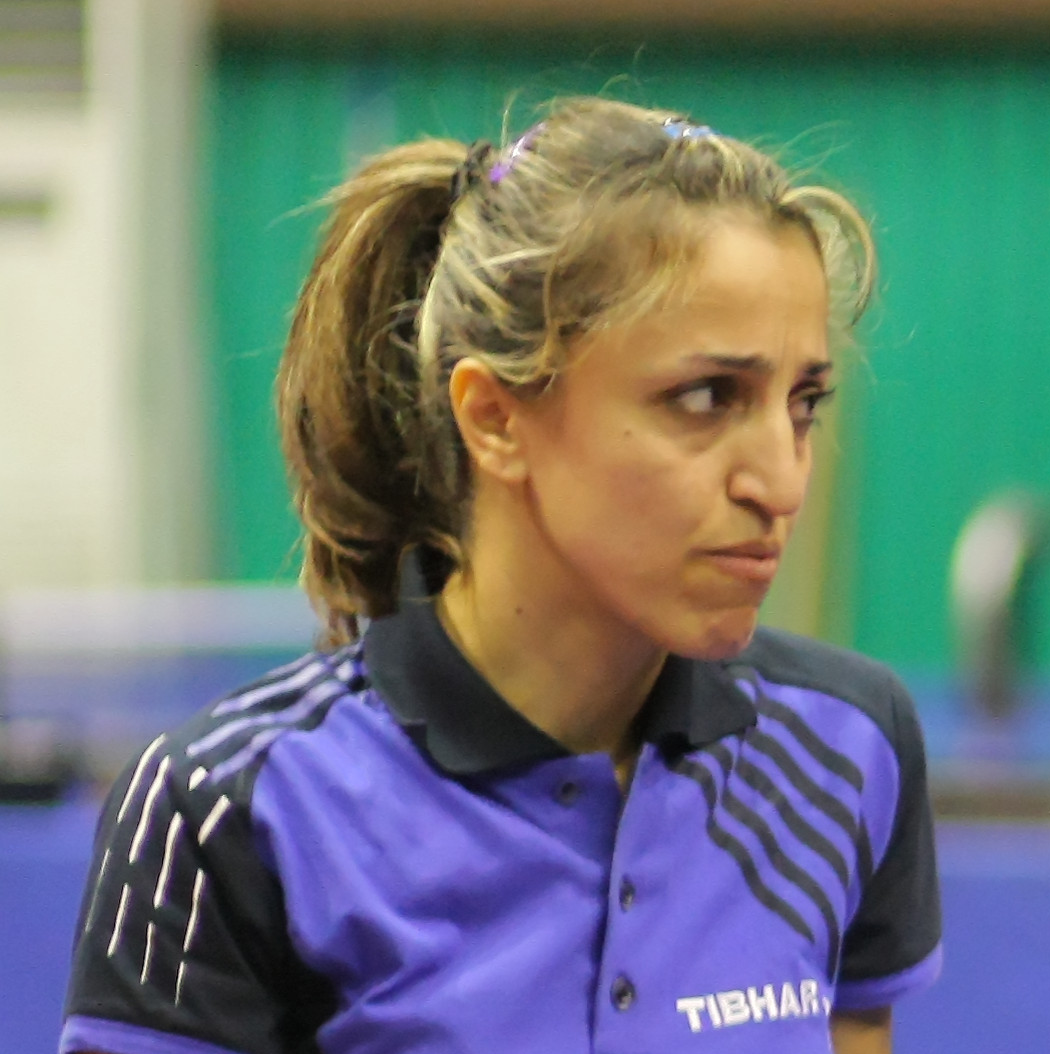

Personal information
- Nationality: Jordanian
- Born: 8 October 1974 (age 51) Amman, Jordan
- Height: 1.50 m (4 ft 11 in)

Sport
- Country: Jordan
- Sport: Para table tennis
- Disability: Paraplegia
- Disability class: C5
- Coached by: Haron Shalkoni
Medal record
Table tennis
Representing Jordan
Paralympic Games
Bronze medal – third place	2004 Athens	Team class 4-5
Bronze medal – third place	2008 Beijing	Team class 4-5
World Championships
Gold medal – first place	2006 Montreux	Teams class 4-5
Silver medal – second place	2006 Montreux	Singles class 4
Silver medal – second place	2014 Beijing	Singles class 5
Bronze medal – third place	2010 Gwangju	Singles class 5
Bronze medal – third place	2010 Gwangju	Teams class 5
Bronze medal – third place	2014 Beijing	Teams class 5
Asian Para Games
Silver medal – second place	2018 Jakarta	Women's singles C5
Bronze medal – third place	2014 Incheon	Women's singles C5
Bronze medal – third place	2014 Incheon	Women's teams C4-5
Asian Championships
Silver medal – second place	2009 Amman	Teams class 4-5
Silver medal – second place	2013 Beijing	Singles class 5
Bronze medal – third place	2007 Seoul	Teams class 5
Bronze medal – third place	2011 Hong Kong	Singles class 5
Bronze medal – third place	2011 Hong Kong	Teams class 4-5
Bronze medal – third place	2013 Beijing	Teams class 4-5
Bronze medal – third place	2015 Amman	Singles class 5
Bronze medal – third place	2015 Amman	Teams class 4-5

Khetam Kamal Hasan Abuawad (born 8 October 1974) is a Jordanian para table tennis player who has spina bifida and has won two medals at the Summer Paralympics and has been competing for Jordan internationally since 1998. She is currently ranked world number one in singles class 5 and world number six in teams class.

== Sporting success ==
=== Early career ===
Her first international competition was the ISMWSF World Wheelchair Games in Stoke Mandeville in 1998, where she also won her first major title: she won two gold medals for singles class 5 and women's team class 2-5 and a silver medal for the wheelchair open competition. One year later, she competed in the Pan Arab Games in 1999 when she won another gold medal for her country in the women's singles class 5 after being defeated by fellow competitor Fatmeh Al Azzam and won her second silver medal in the wheelchair open competition.

In 2002, Abuawad won a bronze medal along with Fatmeh Al Azzam and Maha Al-Bargouthi in the World Team Cup in Roermund, Netherlands. In the same year, she won three gold medals in all of her events, she had beaten Stephanie Mariage of France to win the three titles including the team class 1-5 event at the King Hussein Memorial Tournament in her hometown, Amman. Two years later in 2004, she took part in the T.T. International Masters Italian Open where she got two silver medals after being defeated by Slovenia's Andreja Dolinar in the gold medal match of the wheelchair singles' open and Jitka Pivarciova of Czech Republic, she later took the bronze medal with Al Azzam in the women's team class 1–5.

=== 2004 to 2008 ===
After the Paralympic Games in Athens in 2004, Abuawad was aiming to gain more medals for her country. She took part in the Misr International Tournament in Cairo where she won a silver medal in the women's team class 4-5 and a bronze medal in the singles class 5. She later went on to win six gold medals in the year 2006, she won three gold medals in the singles class 4, wheelchair singles open and team class 4–5 in the City of Liverpool Open in March 2006 and another three gold medals in the same events at the T.T. International Masters Italian Open in September 2006.

She only competed in one international event in the year 2007, the Hong Kong Open where she won a selection of medals: she gained a gold medal in the singles' class 4–5, silver medal in the team's class 4-5 and a bronze medal in the wheelchair open. One year later, she won a silver medal in the singles class 4 and a bronze medal in the team class 4–5 at the Liverpool Open, in the same year she went to the Romanian Open and won the same coloured medals in the same classed events. By the end of 2008, Abuawad secured two gold medals in the Al Watani Championships in Amman in both singles class 1-5 and wheelchair singles open.

In May 2008, she travelled to the Polish Open in Wladyslawowo-Cetniewo where she won three more gold medals in all of her three events: singles, teams and wheelchair singles open. One month later in June, she went to compete in the Romanian Open in Cluj-Napoca where she won a silver medal in the singles class 5 and a bronze medal in the teams class 1–5. One year on, she went on to win two golds at the Al Watani Table Tennis Championships for the second consecutive time in her sporting career.

=== 2010 to 2014 ===
In 2010, she won further medals: four gold medals and a bronze medal in both the annual Al Watani Table Tennis Championships (three golds in singles, wheelchair singles open and teams all in classes 3–5) and the Slovenian Open (one gold medal in singles class 5, one bronze medal in the wheelchair singles open).

Abuawad won even more medals in 2011; she won six medals where five were gold mostly in singles competitions. She successfully defended her titles once more in the Al Watani Championships for the fourth time. She won a gold medal in the singles class 5 and a bronze medal in the teams class 5 in the British Open in Sheffield in September 2011. Before the 2012 Summer Paralympics, Abuawad competed in the Slovenian Open for the second time and won two gold medals in the singles and teams competitions, both in class 5 and again, won another two gold medals in the French Open in Nantes.

During 2013, she won six medals (four of which are gold) in three different locations: Abuawad won her third two sets of golds in the Al Watani Championships, another two golds at the Slovenian Open in all of her selected events, gained a silver and bronze medal in the singles and teams event in the Taichung Table Tennis Open in Taiwan. She attended two events in 2014 and winning one medal each of the singles' competitions, she won her fourth gold medal in the Al Watani Championships and got a silver medal at the Lignano Master Open in Italy.

=== 2015 to present ===
Abuawad earned one gold medal in the singles event in the Slovenian Open for the third time as well as a silver medal in the teams class 5 event in 2015. She lost her reigning title at the Al Watani Championships in the same year as Zhang Bian clinched both the singles and teams titles. She did not win any gold medals in 2016 which was the first time since 2004, she won one silver in the singles class 5 event in the Slovakia Open and a bronze medal in the teams class 5, she also got two bronze medals in the same events in the Slovenian Open. Abuawad gained six medals in 2017, four of them gold in the singles and two silvers in the teams events. She won her two singles titles in the Alicante Open, Al-Watani Championships, Slovenian Open and the Thailand Open. She won her teams events' silvers in both Thailand and Slovenia.

== Paralympics progression ==
=== 2000 Summer Paralympics ===
The 2000 Summer Paralympics were Abuawad's debut Paralympics where she competed for singles. She won her match against Stephanie Palasse of France but lost to Ren Guixiang of China, she was however qualified to advance into the quarterfinals. She competed again Jitka Pivarciova of Czech Republic but lost in two sets.

Meanwhile, in the team events, Abuawad and Al Bargouthi were placed third out of four teams in their group play behind Mexico and Chinese Taipei.

=== 2004 Summer Paralympics ===
The 2004 Summer Paralympics were Abuawad's second Paralympic games where she took part along with Al Azzam and Al Bargouthi, she competed for the singles' class 5 and team class 4–5. Abuawad was defeated in straight sets in her group play in the singles' competition by China's Ren Gui Xiang and Chinese Taipei's Wei Mei Hui.

In the women's team class 4–5, Abuawad along with Al Azzam and Al Bargouthi were placed in second position in their round robin group after losing their match in straight sets to Chinese Taipei and tightly won the game against Germany. In the quarterfinals, they competed against Slovakia and won the match 3 sets to 2. The semifinals saw China defeating the Jordanian team in 3 sets, after their loss, they were up against France in the bronze medal match. Abuawad's team won against France and successfully gained the bronze medal for her country.

=== 2008 Summer Paralympics ===
At the 2008 Summer Paralympics, she was determined to succeed and win another medal from her previous Paralympics four years earlier. She was positioned in first position after winning all three of her games in the group play at the women's singles class 5, she later went on to compete against Ren Guixiang of China where she lost the game, Abuawad then played the bronze medal match against Andrea Zimmerer of Germany but she was heavily defeated and placed in fourth place in the singles' competition.

Meanwhile, in the women's team class 4–5, Abuawad teamed up with Al Azzam and Al Bargouthi once more and were hoping to get a medal for their team. In the round of 16, she was playing against South Africa's Alisha Almeida and won three sets in the singles' match and won the doubles' event along with Al Azzam, the quarterfinals saw the team against Chinese Taipei in which they narrowly won against Wei Mei Hui and Tsai Hui Chu. The reigning champions China beat Abuawad's team in the semifinals three games to one. In the bronze medal match, they had their hopes up and were up against Serbia and won their bronze medal consecutively.

=== 2012 Summer Paralympics ===
Abuawad did well in her group play at the 2012 Summer Paralympics after winning both of her games in straight sets against Kimie Bessho of Japan and Marta Makishi of Argentina. In the semifinals, she lost to China's Gu Gai in three sets to one but lost once more in the bronze medal match where Ingela Lundback from Sweden won the bronze medal.

Abuawad teamed up with Fatmeh Al-Azzam in the women's team class 4–5, they were unsuccessful in the competition after being narrowly defeated by Sweden's Anna-Carin Ahlquist and Ingela Lundback in the quarterfinals.

=== 2016 Summer Paralympics ===
The 2016 Summer Paralympics saw Abuawad join Al Bargouthi where both of them competed in the team events together. Abuawad won both her games in the group play against Caroline Tabib of Israel and Maria Paredes of Mexico. She went into the quarterfinals against Ingela Lundback who defeated her again after they last met in the 2012 Summer Paralympics' bronze medal match where Abuawad previously lost to the Swedish table tennis player.

The Jordanian women's table tennis team were unlucky again after being defeated by Mexico in two out of three games.

== See also ==
- Jordan at the 2004 Summer Paralympics
- Jordan at the 2008 Summer Paralympics
