= Christiane Pape =

German para table tennis player

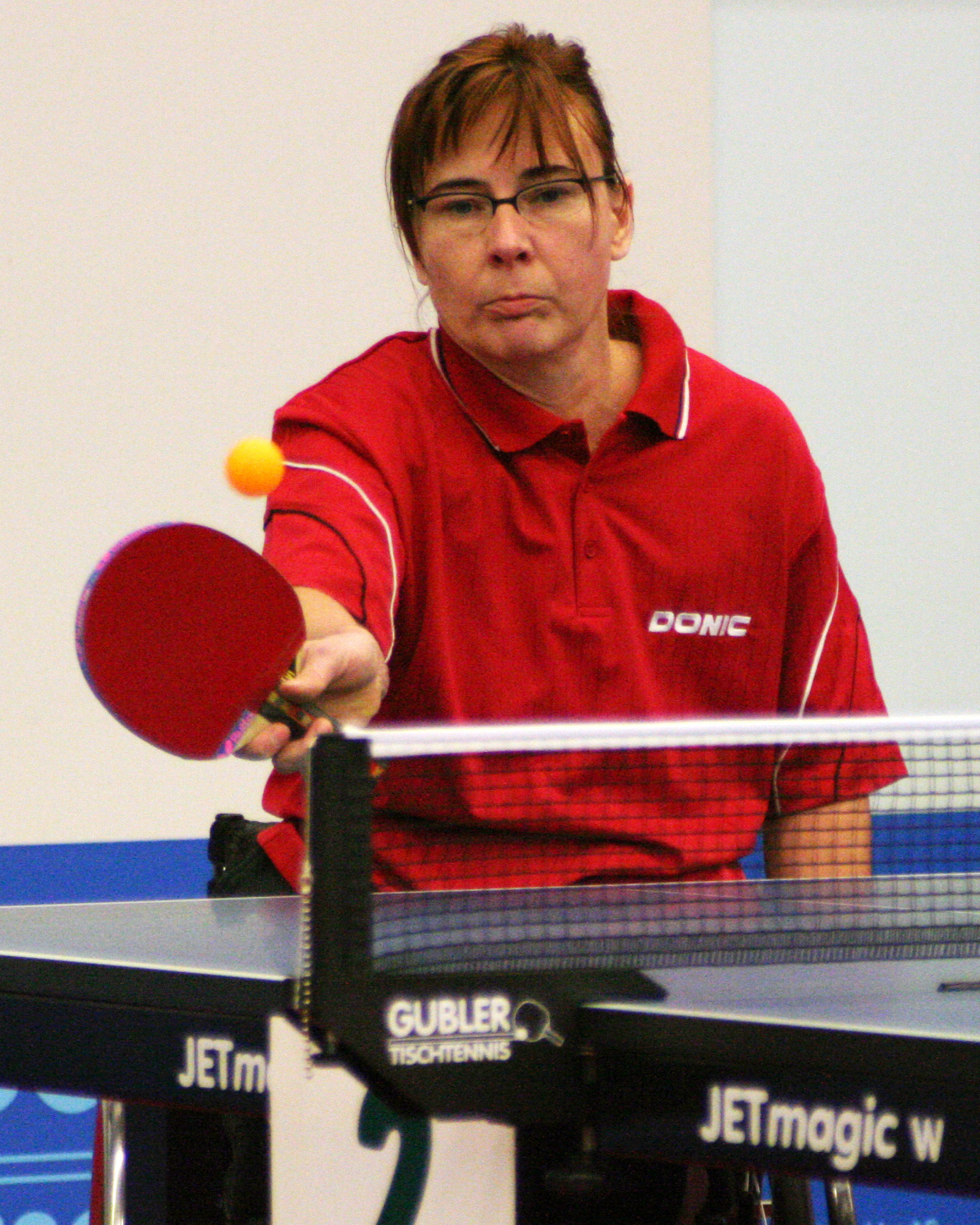
- Christiane Pape in 2005

Personal information
- Born: 12 December 1960 (age 65) Nuremberg, West Germany

Sport
- Country: Germany
- Sport: Para table tennis
- Disability class: C4
- Retired: 2011
Medal record
Para table tennis
Representing Germany
Paralympic Games
Gold medal – first place	1992 Barcelona	Women's open singles wheelchair
Gold medal – first place	1996 Atlanta	Women's open singles wheelchair
Gold medal – first place	1996 Atlanta	Women's teams C3-5
Gold medal – first place	2000 Sydney	Women's singles C4
Silver medal – second place	1992 Barcelona	Women's singles C4
Silver medal – second place	1992 Barcelona	Women's teams C5
Silver medal – second place	1996 Atlanta	Women's singles C4
Silver medal – second place	2000 Sydney	Women's teams C4-5
Bronze medal – third place	2004 Athens	Women's singles C4
World Championships
Gold medal – first place	1990 Assen	Women's singles C4
Gold medal – first place	1990 Assen	Women's teams C4-5
Gold medal – first place	1998 Paris	Women's singles C4
Gold medal – first place	1998 Paris	Women's teams C4-5
Gold medal – first place	2002 Taipei	Women's teams C4
Bronze medal – third place	1998 Paris	Women's open singles wheelchair
Bronze medal – third place	2002 Taipei	Women's singles C4
European Championships
Gold medal – first place	1991 Salou	Women's open singles wheelchair
Gold medal – first place	1991 Salou	Women's teams C5
Gold medal – first place	1995 Hillerød	Women's teams C3-4
Gold medal – first place	1997 Stockholm	Women's open singles wheelchair
Gold medal – first place	1997 Stockholm	Women's singles C4
Gold medal – first place	1997 Stockholm	Women's teams C4
Gold medal – first place	1999 Piešťany	Women's doubles C1-5
Gold medal – first place	1999 Piešťany	Women's open singles wheelchair
Gold medal – first place	1999 Piešťany	Women's teams C4
Gold medal – first place	2001 Frankfurt	Women's singles C4
Gold medal – first place	2001 Frankfurt	Women's teams C4
Silver medal – second place	1991 Salou	Women's singles C4
Silver medal – second place	1995 Hillerød	Women's singles C4
Silver medal – second place	1999 Piešťany	Women's singles C4
Silver medal – second place	2001 Frankfurt	Women's open singles wheelchair

Christiane Pape (née Weninger, born 12 December 1960) is a former German para table tennis player who has won fifteen medals in European championships, seven medals in world championships and was one of the first athletes to win medals for reunified Germany in 1992.
