= Fiji at the 2000 Summer Paralympics =

- IPC code: FIJ
- NPC: Fiji Paralympic Association

in Sydney
- Competitors: 4 in 3 sports
- Medals: Gold 0 Silver 0 Bronze 0 Total 0

Summer Paralympics appearances (overview)
- 1964; 1968–1972; 1976; 1980–1992; 1996; 2000; 2004; 2008; 2012; 2016; 2020; 2024

Fiji competed at the 2000 Summer Paralympics in Sydney, Australia.

The country was represented by four athletes competing in three sports. No Fiji Islander won any medals.

== Athletics ==
- Men's Javelin F37: Atunaisa Domonibitu
- Men's 100 m T12: Fuata Faktaufon

== Judo ==
- Men's -73 kg: Ratu Tevita Susu

== Swimming ==
- Men's 100 m Freestyle S9: Manasa Marisiale
- Men's 200 m Medley S9: Manasa Marisiale
- Men's 50 m Freestyle S9: Manasa Marisiale

== See also ==
- Fiji at the 2000 Summer Olympics
