= Fiji at the 2004 Summer Paralympics =

- IPC code: FIJ
- NPC: Fiji Paralympic Association

in Athens
- Competitors: 2 in 2 sports
- Flag bearer: Manasa Marisiale
- Medals: Gold 0 Silver 0 Bronze 0 Total 0

Summer Paralympics appearances (overview)
- 1964; 1968–1972; 1976; 1980–1992; 1996; 2000; 2004; 2008; 2012; 2016; 2020; 2024

Fiji competed at the 2004 Summer Paralympics in Athens, Greece. The country was represented by two athletes competing in two sports. Neither Fijian won any medals.

Sarote Ravai Fiu was the first woman ever to compete for Fiji at the Paralympic Games.

== Athletics ==
Athlete	Class	Event	Final		
Athlete	Class	Event	Result	Points	Rank
Sarote Ravai Fiu	F42-46	Shot put	7.71	680	16

== Swimming ==
Athlete	Class	Event	Heats		Final	
Athlete	Class	Event	Result	Rank	Result	Rank
Manasa Marisiale	S9	50m freestyle	30.65	21	did not advance	
Manasa Marisiale	SM9	200m individual medley	DSQ		did not advance	

== See also ==
- Fiji at the Paralympics
- Fiji at the 2004 Summer Olympics
