= Hagit Brill =

Israeli Paralympic table tennis player

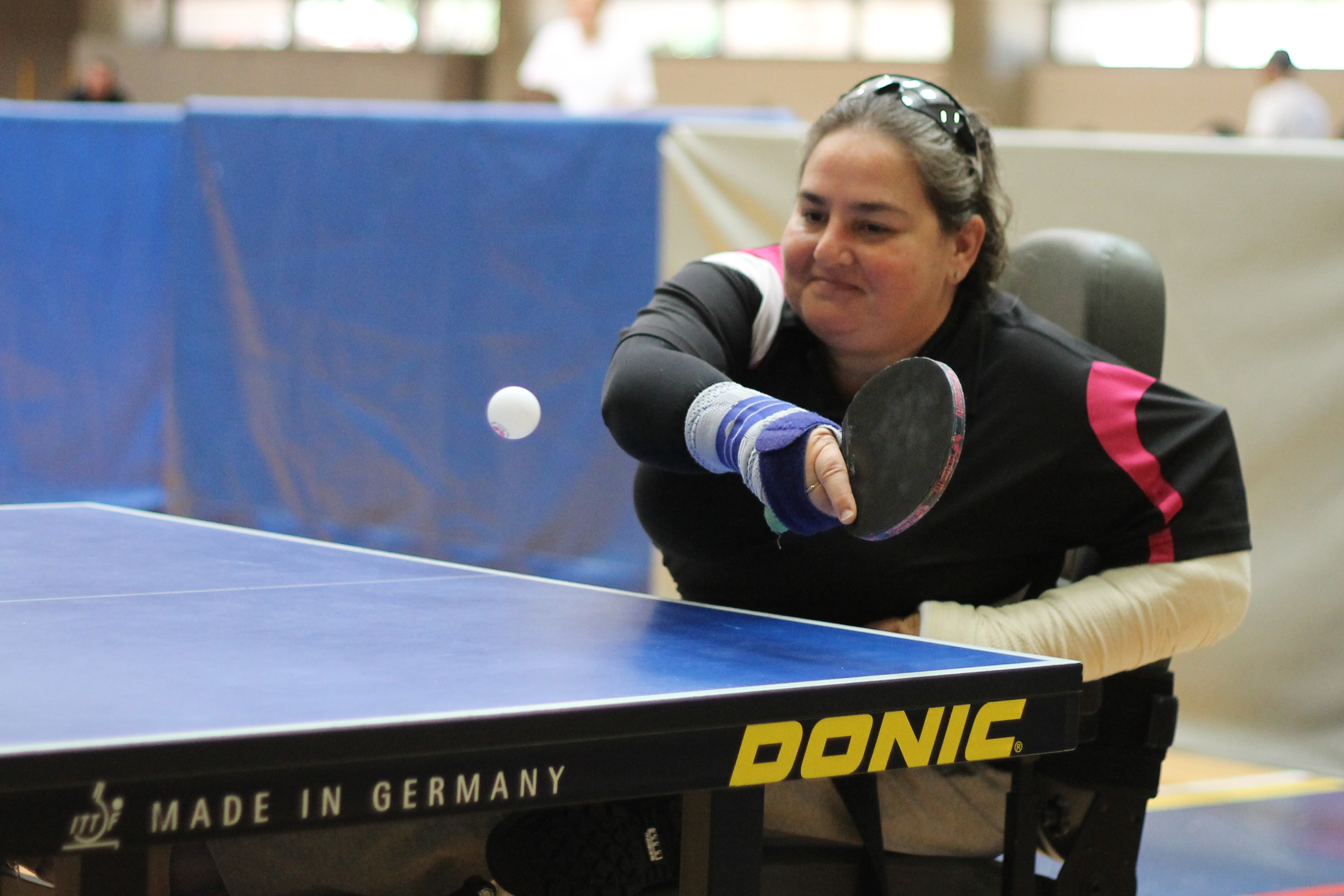

Personal information
- Native name: חגית בריל
- Born: December 10, 1974 Ramat Gan, Israel
- Died: July 22, 2024 (aged 49)

Sport
- Country: Israel
- Sport: Para table tennis
Medal record
Representing Israel
European Championships
Bronze medal – third place	2019 Helsingbord	Singles 1

Hagit Yona Brill (Hebrew: חגית יונה בריל; December 10, 1974 – July 22, 2024) was an Israeli Paralympic table tennis player, and weightlifter.

She competed at the 2000 Summer Paralympics and 2016 Summer Paralympics. She won a bronze medal at the European Championships.

== Life ==
Brill grew up in Ramat Gan in 1974. When she was a child, she practiced swimming in Maccabiah Village. During her military service in the Intelligence Corps, Brill was injured.

The beginning of her career in para sports was in weightlifting. She trained with Avi Brunner. She competed at the 2000 Summer Paralympics, in Sydney, where Brill set a national record in weightlifting, when she pressed 62.5 kg and was ranked ninth.

In 2010, she served as a parliamentary assistant to Knesset member Yisrael Hason, becoming the first parliamentary assistant, reliant on a wheelchair.

In 2015, she began competing in table tennis at the international level and won a silver medal at the German Open Championship. She won a bronze medal in the Czech Open Championship. She competed at the 2016 Paralympic Games in Rio de Janeiro, in the individual tournament, and the team tournament with Caroline Tabib. She lost both games in the group stage of the singles tournament, and did not advance to the quarterfinals.

In September 2019, she competed at the European Para Table Tennis Championships, winning a bronze medal.
