= Merewalesi Roden =

Fijian Paralympic table tennis player (born 1967)

Personal information
- Born: September 9, 1967 (age 59)

Sport
- Country: Fiji
- Sport: Table tennis
- Event: Singles class 5
Medal record
Gold medal – first place	2015 Port Moresby	Table tennis

Merewalesi Roden (born September 9, 1967) is a Fijian Paralympic athlete. She competed at the 2016 Summer Paralympics for Fiji in table tennis. She lost her first match to South Korea's Jung Young-a in three straight sets. She also lost her last match to Sweden's Ingela Lundbäck. She won a silver medal at the 2015 Oceania Para Championships and a gold medal at the 2015 Pacific Games in the women's seated category.
