= Pan Jiamin =

Chinese para table tennis player

Personal information
- Born: 2 May 1997 (age 29) Guangdong, China

Sport
- Sport: Table tennis
Medal record
Women's para table tennis
Representing China
Paralympic Games
Gold medal – first place	2024 Paris	Doubles WD10
Silver medal – second place	2020 Tokyo	Singles C5
Silver medal – second place	2024 Paris	Singles C5
Asian Para Games
Gold medal – first place	2022 Hangzhou	Singles C5
Bronze medal – third place	2018 Jakarta	Singles C5

Pan Jiamin (born 2 May 1997) is a Chinese para table tennis player. She won the silver medal in the women's individual C5 event at the 2020 Summer Paralympics held in Tokyo, Japan.
