= Fiji at the 1976 Summer Paralympics =

- IPC code: FIJ
- NPC: Fiji Paralympic Association

in Toronto
- Competitors: 8 in 2 sports
- Medals Ranked 34th: Gold 0 Silver 0 Bronze 0 Total 0

Summer Paralympics appearances (overview)
- 1964; 1968–1972; 1976; 1980–1992; 1996; 2000; 2004; 2008; 2012; 2016; 2020; 2024

Fiji competed at the 1976 Summer Paralympics in Toronto, Ontario, Canada. Fiji was making its return to the Paralympic Games, having been absent since 1964. The country was represented by eight athletes competing in two sports: athletics and swimming. Fiji's representatives did not win any medals.

== See also ==
- Fiji at the 1976 Summer Olympics
