= Fiji at the 1964 Summer Paralympics =

- IPC code: FIJ
- NPC: Fiji Paralympic Association

in Tokyo
- Competitors: 1 in 1 sport
- Medals: Gold 0 Silver 0 Bronze 0 Total 0

Summer Paralympics appearances (overview)
- 1964; 1968–1972; 1976; 1980–1992; 1996; 2000; 2004; 2008; 2012; 2016; 2020; 2024

Fiji competed at the 1964 Summer Paralympics in Tokyo, Japan. It was Fiji's first participation in the Paralympic Games. The country (a British colony at the time) was represented by a single athlete, who competed in weightlifting, and did not win a medal.

== Weightlifting ==
Name	Event	Result	Rank
Nakatabrca	Men's Middleweight	90 kg	5th (out of 5)
