= Fiji at the 1996 Summer Paralympics =

- IPC code: FIJ
- NPC: Fiji Paralympic Association

in Atlanta
- Competitors: 2 in 1 sport
- Medals: Gold 0 Silver 0 Bronze 0 Total 0

Summer Paralympics appearances (overview)
- 1964; 1968–1972; 1976; 1980–1992; 1996; 2000; 2004; 2008; 2012; 2016; 2020; 2024

Fiji competed at the 1996 Summer Paralympics in Atlanta, United States. Fiji was making its return to the Paralympic Games, having been absent since 1976. The country was represented by two athletes, Elia Sarisoso and Joseva Verivou, both competing in track and field. Neither won any medals.

== See also ==
- Fiji at the 1996 Summer Olympics
