= Fiji at the Paralympics =

- IPC code: FIJ
- NPC: Fiji Paralympic Association
- Medals: Gold 1 Silver 0 Bronze 0 Total 1

Summer appearances
- 1964; 1968–1972; 1976; 1980–1992; 1996; 2000; 2004; 2008; 2012; 2016; 2020; 2024

Fiji first competed at the Summer Paralympic Games in 1964, sending a single athlete to compete in weightlifting, then missed out on two consecutive Games before returning in 1976, with a larger delegation of eight competitors in swimming and athletics. The country was then absent for four more consecutive Games, returning to the Paralympics in 1996 with two competitors in athletics. Fiji has participated in every subsequent edition of the Summer Games.

Fiji Islanders won their first medal, a gold, at the 2012 Summer Paralympics in London, in the Men's High Jump F42. It was won by Iliesa Delana, the country's flag bearer and sole representative. It was the first gold medal ever won by a Pacific Island athlete at the Paralympics or at the Olympics, and only the second ever Paralympic medal won by a Pacific Island athlete (following Francis Kompaon's silver in sprinting for Papua New Guinea in 2008).

Fiji has never taken part in the Winter Paralympic Games.

== List of medallists ==
| Medal | Name | Games | Sport | Event |
|---|---|---|---|---|
| Gold | Iliesa Delana | 2012 London | Athletics | Men's High Jump F42 |

=== Medals by Summer sport ===
| Sport | Gold | Silver | Bronze | Total |
|---|---|---|---|---|
| Athletics | 1 | 0 | 0 | 1 |
| Totals (1 entries) | 1 | 0 | 0 | 1 |

== See also ==
- Fiji at the Olympics
