= Claire Robertson (table tennis) =

Table Tennis Player

Personal information
- Born: 25 August 1975 Blaengwynfi, Wales
- Died: 26 October 2017 (aged 42) Saltney, Wales

Sport
- Country: Great Britain
- Sport: Para table tennis
- Disability: Spinal cord injury
- Disability class: C4
Medal record
Para table tennis
Representing Great Britain
European Championships
Bronze medal – third place	2001 Frankfurt	Women's teams C4
Bronze medal – third place	2005 Jesolo	Women's teams C4

Claire Robertson née Harris (25 August 1975 – 26 October 2017) was a para table tennis player who competed in international level events. She was a double European bronze medalist in the team events and she has competed at the 2002 Commonwealth Games and 2006 Commonwealth Games where she reached the quarterfinals in the women's EAD doubles with Sara Head. She also participated at the 2008 Summer Paralympics in the women's singles C4 where she didn't advance to the final rounds.

She was married to Scott Robertson who was also a para table tennis player and they were both coached by Stefan Trofan. She died suddenly of a short illness in Flintshire.
