= Gu Gai =

Chinese para table tennis player

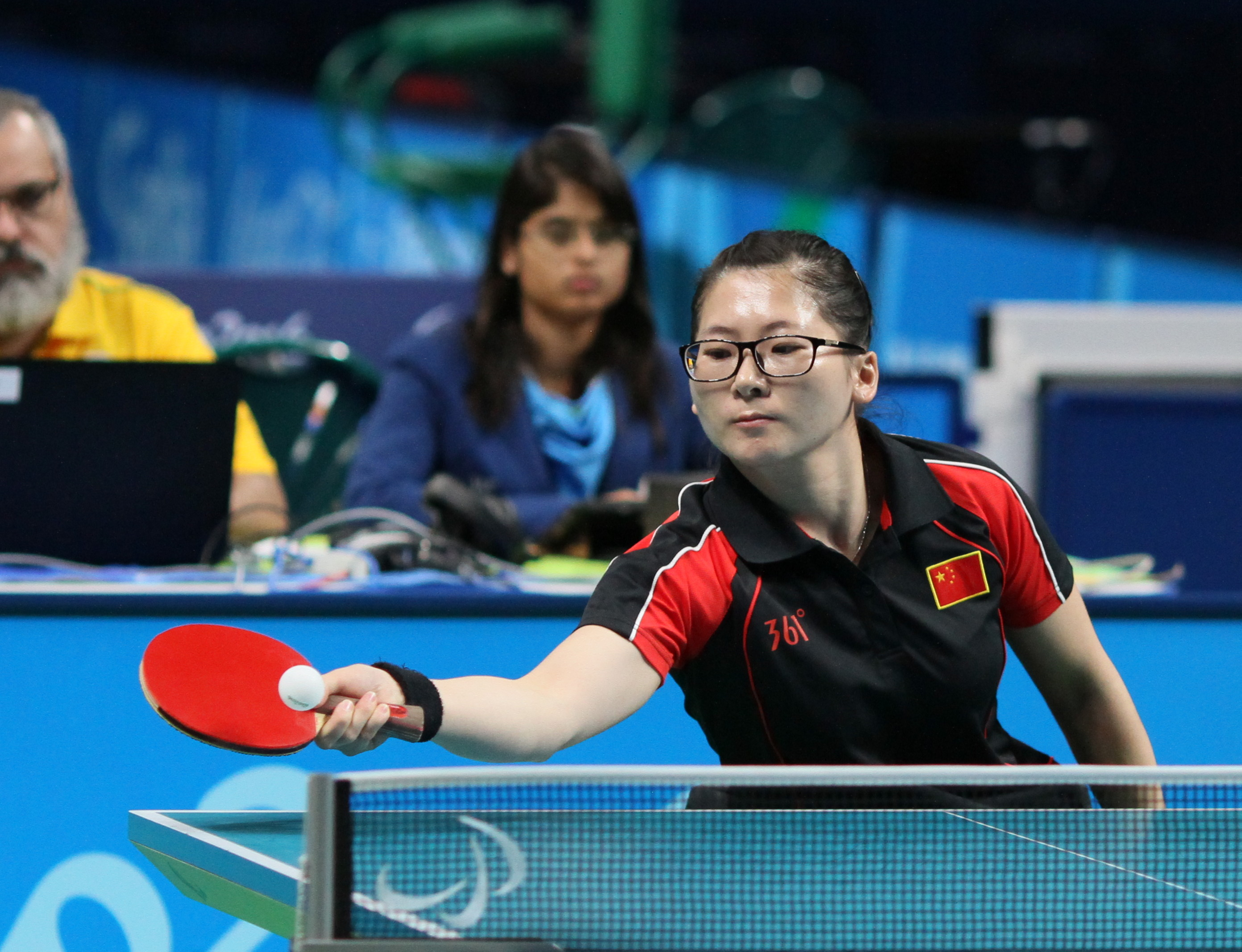
- Gu at the 2016 Summer Paralympics

Personal information
- Born: May 16, 1989 (age 37) Pizhou, Jiangsu, China
- Height: 153 cm (5 ft 0 in)
- Weight: 42 kg (93 lb)

Sport
- Sport: Table tennis
- Playing style: Right-handed shakehand grip
- Disability class: 5
- Highest ranking: 1 (July 2011)
Medal record
Women's para table tennis
Representing China
Paralympic Games
| Gold medal – first place | 2008 Beijing | Teams C4–5 |
| Gold medal – first place | 2012 London | Teams C4–5 |
| Gold medal – first place | 2016 Rio de Janeiro | Teams C4–5 |
| Silver medal – second place | 2008 Beijing | Singles C5 |
| Silver medal – second place | 2012 London | Singles C5 |
| Silver medal – second place | 2016 Rio de Janeiro | Singles C5 |
World Championships
| Gold medal – first place | 2006 Montreux | Teams C5 |
| Gold medal – first place | 2010 Gwangju | Singles C5 |
| Gold medal – first place | 2010 Gwangju | Teams C5 |
| Silver medal – second place | 2006 Montreux | Open singles standing |
| Silver medal – second place | 2010 Gwangju | Open singles wheelchair |
Asian Para Games
| Gold medal – first place | 2010 Guangzhou | Singles C5 |
| Gold medal – first place | 2010 Guangzhou | Teams C4–5 |
Asian Championships
| Gold medal – first place | 2005 Kuala Lumpur | Teams C5 |
| Gold medal – first place | 2005 Kuala Lumpur | Open singles standing |
| Gold medal – first place | 2007 Seoul | Teams C4–5 |
| Gold medal – first place | 2007 Seoul | Open singles wheelchair |
| Gold medal – first place | 2009 Amman | Teams C4–5 |
| Gold medal – first place | 2011 Hong Kong | Teams C4–5 |
| Gold medal – first place | 2015 Amman | Teams C4–5 |
| Silver medal – second place | 2005 Kuala Lumpur | Singles C5 |
| Silver medal – second place | 2009 Amman | Singles C5 |
| Silver medal – second place | 2009 Amman | Open singles wheelchair |
| Silver medal – second place | 2011 Hong Kong | Singles C5 |
| Silver medal – second place | 2015 Amman | Singles C5 |
| Bronze medal – third place | 2007 Seoul | Singles C5 |
FESPIC Championships
| Gold medal – first place | 2003 Shanghai | Singles C4–5 |

Gu Gai
- Traditional Chinese: 顧改
- Simplified Chinese: 顾改
Transcriptions
Standard Mandarin
- Hanyu Pinyin: Gù Gǎi

Gu Gai (Chinese: 顾改, born 16 May 1989) is a former Chinese para table tennis player who was a triple Paralympic champion in team events, a double World champion in teams events and a four-time Asian champion in both team events. Gu won team event titles along with Zhang Bian and Zhou Ying.

Like many of her teammates, Gu was a polio victim from Pizhou who attended New Hope Center as a child. That's where coach Heng Xin developed her into a star.

== Personal life ==
Gu Gai is married to her national teammate Feng Panfeng. They have a son together.
