= Fiji Paralympic Association =

National Paralympic Committee of Fiji

National Paralympic Committee
- Country: Fiji
- Code: FIJ
- President: Ms Shaenaz Voss

Fiji Paralympic Association is the National Paralympic Committee in Fiji for the Paralympic Games movement. It is a non-profit organisation that selects teams, and raises funds to send Fijian competitors to Paralympic events organised by the International Paralympic Committee (IPC).

The organization is based in Suva. The organization's president is Freddy Fatiaki. The organization was founded in 1990 as the Fiji Sports Association for the Disabled (FSAD). Organized disability sport predated this in Fiji, with national competitions taking place as early as 1984. Within a year of being constituted, the organization was recognized by the country's NOC, the IPC and national sporting federations including athletics, archery, judo, swimming, table tennis and powerlifting. A few years later, they would also be recognized by the national tennis federation. FSAD changed its name to the Fiji Paralympic Committee in 2008 to comply with an IPC directive that NPCs include Paralympic in their name. While Paralympic athletes are supported on equal terms with Olympic athletes, success has been limited to only a few sports. Problems include expensive transport, lack of expertise, and lack of suitable infrastructure. Funding is a major reason for the lack of advancement of the Fiji Paralympic Committee in supporting Paralympic sport in the country.

The NPC has had international support from the Australian Sports Commission and the Oceania Paralympic Committee. They have helped the NPC grow disability sport in the country and offer programs in schools.

== See also ==
- Fiji at the Paralympics
