= Ranjesh Prakash =

Fijian Paralympic sprinter

Personal information
- Nationality: Fiji
- Born: 9 July 1989 (age 36)

Sport
- Country: Fiji
- Sport: Athletics
- Event(s): 100 m, 200 m
Medal record
Athletics (T13)
FESPIC Games
Bronze medal – third place	2006 Kuala Lumpur	200m
Arafura Games
Bronze medal – third place	2007 Darwin	?

Ranjesh Prakash (born 9 July 1989) in Vatulaulau, Ba, Fiji, is a Fiji Islands track and field athlete. He competes in sprinting for athletes with visual impairments (in the T13 category for partial blindness).

Prakash initially studied at the DAV College in Nabua, before studying at the Suva Blind School in Suva. He graduated from Fiji National University in 2013 with a Trade Diploma in Office Administration and then studied at Australian Catholic University.

In the FESPIC Games of 2006 in Kuala Lumpur, he won bronze in the 200 metre event. He also won a bronze medal at the Arafura Games in Darwin, in 2007.

Prakash was Fiji's flagbearer and sole representative at the 2008 Summer Paralympics in Beijing, where he competed in the 100 metre sprint and finished in 23rd place out of 25 runners. It was his first participation in the Paralympic Games.

Prakash went on to compete in the 2011 South Pacific Games held in Nouméa, New Caledonia where he won a bronze medal for the 100m Parasport Ambulant.

His personal bests are 11.9 second in the 100 metres and 25 seconds in the 200 metres.
