= Alice Rast =

Swiss para table tennis player

Personal information
- Born: 22 July 1959 Zurich, Switzerland
- Died: 2006 (aged 46–47)

Sport
- Sport: Para table tennis
Medal record
Representing Switzerland
Paralympic Games
Bronze medal – third place	2000 Sydney	Singles C4
European Championships
Silver medal – second place	1995 Hillerød	Teams C3-4

Alice Rast (22 July 1959 - c.2006) was a Swiss para table tennis player who competed at international table tennis competitions. She is a Paralympic bronze medalist and a European silver medalist.
