= Epeli Baleibau =

Fijian athlete

Personal information
- Born: 8 June 1972 (age 52)

Sport
- Country: Fiji
- Sport: Track and field
- Event: High Jump T47

Epeli Baleibau (born 8 June 1972) is a Fijian athlete. He competed for Fiji at the 2016 Summer Paralympics.
