= Monika Sikora =

German para table tennis player

Monika Sikora-Weinmann
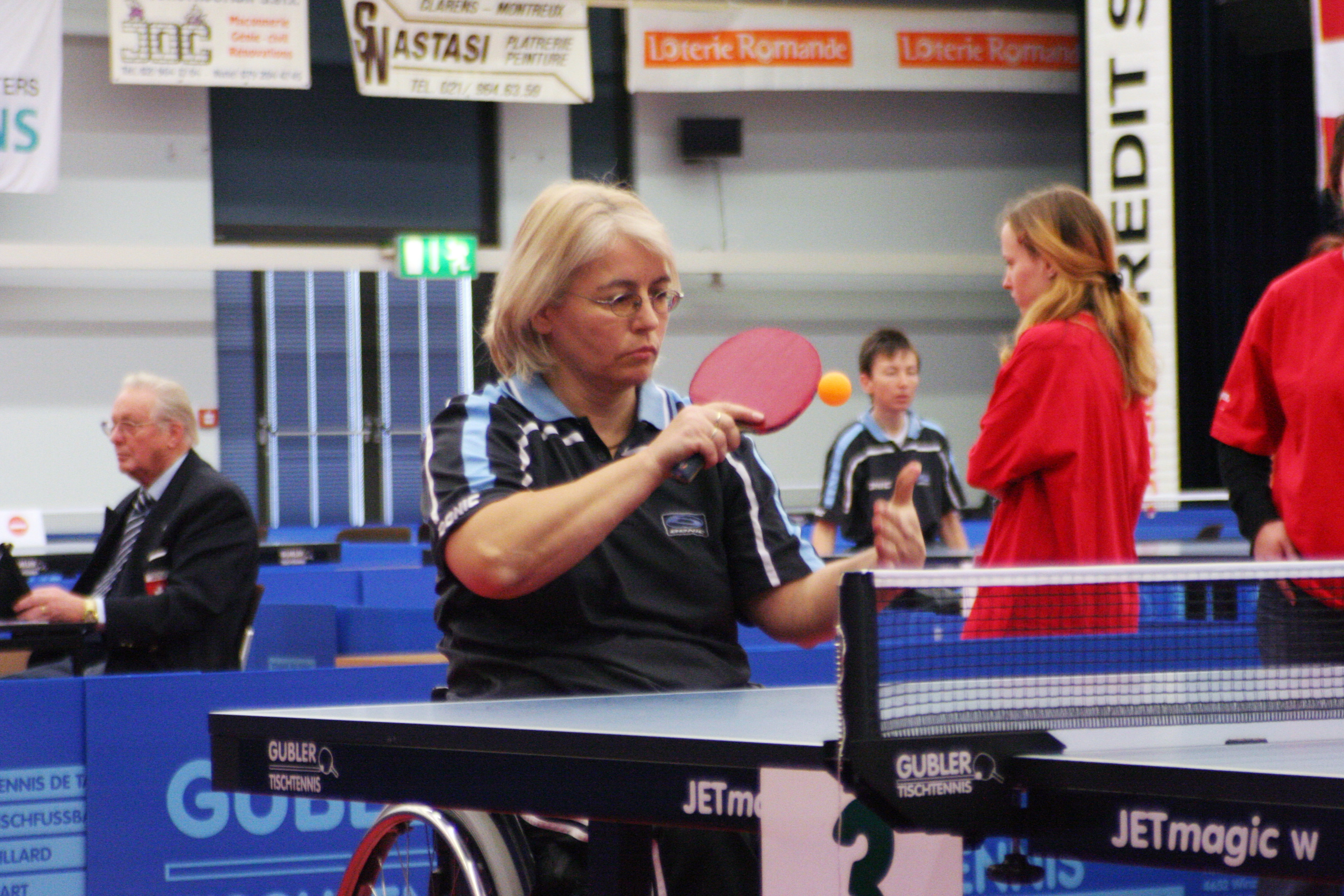
- Sikora-Weinmann in 2005

Personal information
- Born: 1 January 1958 (age 68) Ennigerloh, West Germany

Sport
- Country: Germany
- Sport: Para table tennis
- Disability class: C4
- Retired: 2008
Medal record
Para table tennis
Representing Germany
Paralympic Games
Gold medal – first place	1992 Barcelona	Singles C4
Gold medal – first place	1996 Atlanta	Teams C3-5
Gold medal – first place	2004 Athens	Singles C4
Silver medal – second place	1992 Barcelona	Teams C5
Silver medal – second place	2000 Sydney	Singles C4
Silver medal – second place	2000 Sydney	Teams C4-5
Silver medal – second place	2008 Beijing	Teams C4-5
World Championships
Gold medal – first place	1990 Assen	Open singles wheelchair
Gold medal – first place	1990 Assen	Teams C4-5
Gold medal – first place	1998 Paris	Teams C4-5
Gold medal – first place	2002 Taipei	Singles C4
Gold medal – first place	2002 Taipei	Teams C4
Silver medal – second place	2006 Montreux	Teams C5
Bronze medal – third place	1990 Assen	Singles C4
Bronze medal – third place	1998 Paris	Open singles wheelchair
Bronze medal – third place	1998 Paris	Singles C4
European Championships
Gold medal – first place	1991 Salou	Singles C4
Gold medal – first place	1991 Salou	Teams C5
Gold medal – first place	1995 Hillerød	Singles C4
Gold medal – first place	1995 Hillerød	Teams C3-4
Gold medal – first place	1997 Stockholm	Teams C4
Gold medal – first place	1999 Piešťany	Doubles C10
Gold medal – first place	1999 Piešťany	Singles C4
Gold medal – first place	1999 Piešťany	Teams C4
Gold medal – first place	2001 Frankfurt	Teams C4
Gold medal – first place	2003 Zagreb	Singles C4
Gold medal – first place	2005 Jesolo	Teams C5
Gold medal – first place	2007 Kranjska Gora	Teams C5
Silver medal – second place	1997 Stockholm	Singles C4
Silver medal – second place	1999 Piešťany	Open singles wheelchair
Silver medal – second place	2001 Frankfurt	Singles C4
Silver medal – second place	2003 Zagreb	Teams C4-5
Bronze medal – third place	1991 Salou	Singles C4
Bronze medal – third place	2003 Zagreb	Open singles standing
Bronze medal – third place	2005 Jesolo	Singles C4

Monika Sikora-Weinmann (born 1 January 1958) is a German para table tennis player. She won gold at the Paralympics and World Championships several times.

On 23 June 1993, she was awarded the Silver Laurel Leaf for her athletic achievements.

== Career ==
At the 1988 Summer Paralympics, she won a silver medal in Singles 4.

At the 1992 Summer Paralympics in Barcelona, she won a gold medal in the Singles 4, and a silver in the team 5 competition.

At the 1996 Summer Paralympics, she took first place in the Teams 3–5 competition.

At the 2000 Summer Paralympics, she won a silver medal in Singles 4, and another in Teams 4–5.

At the 2004 Summer Paralympics, she won a gold medal in Singles 4.

At the 2008 Summer Paralympics, she earned a silver medal in the Women's team – Class 4–5.

In 1991, in Salou, she became the European champion in singles and with the German team. She repeated this success in 1995 in Hillerød. In 1997, she won individual silver and team gold at the European Championships in Stockholm.

Sikora also competed at the World Championships multiple times, winning gold with the team in 1990, 1998 and 2002. In 2002, she was also the world champion in singles.
