= Zhang Bian =

Chinese para table tennis player

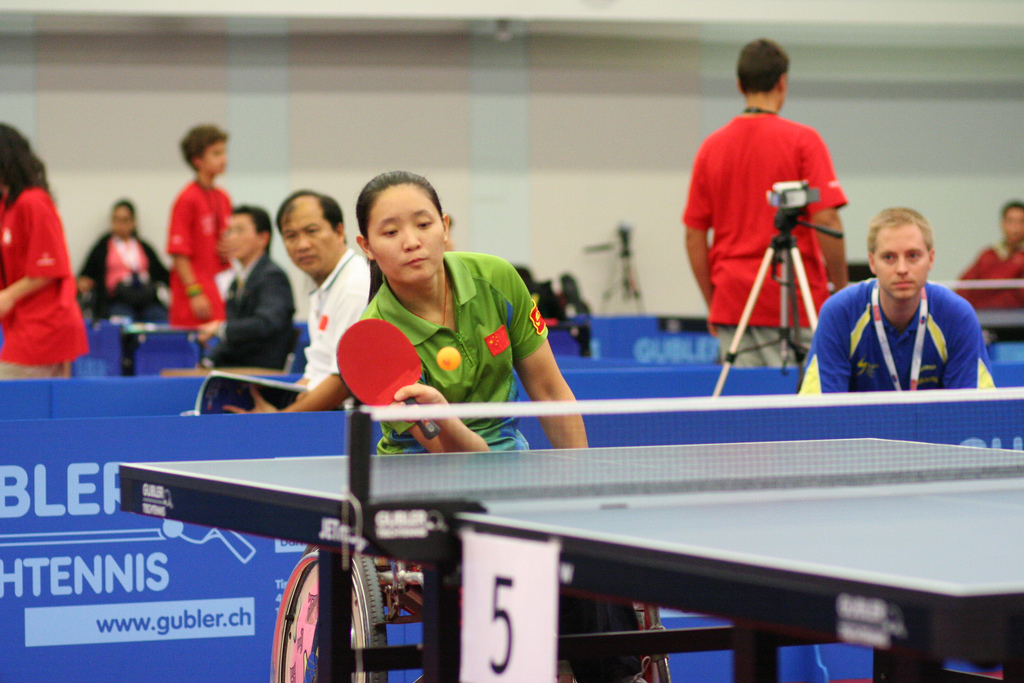
- Zhang at the 2006 World Para Table Tennis Championships

Personal information
- Born: August 29, 1986 (age 39) Pizhou, Jiangsu, China
- Height: 155 cm (5 ft 1 in)
- Weight: 47 kg (104 lb)

Sport
- Sport: Table tennis
- Playing style: Right-handed shakehand grip
- Disability class: 5
- Highest ranking: 1 (October 2012)
- Current ranking: 1
Medal record
Women's para table tennis
Representing China
Paralympic Games
Gold medal – first place	2008 Beijing	Teams C4–5
Gold medal – first place	2012 London	Singles C5
Gold medal – first place	2012 London	Teams C4–5
Gold medal – first place	2016 Rio de Janeiro	Singles C5
Gold medal – first place	2016 Rio de Janeiro	Teams C4–5
Gold medal – first place	2020 Tokyo	Singles C5
Gold medal – first place	2020 Tokyo	Teams C4-5
Gold medal – first place	2024 Paris	Singles C5
World Championships
Gold medal – first place	2006 Montreux	Teams C5
Gold medal – first place	2014 Beijing	Singles C5
Gold medal – first place	2014 Beijing	Teams C5
Silver medal – second place	2006 Montreux	Singles C5
Asian Para Games
Gold medal – first place	2010 Guangzhou	Teams C4–5
Gold medal – first place	2014 Incheon	Singles C5
Gold medal – first place	2014 Incheon	Teams C4–5
Gold medal – first place	2018 Jakarta	Singles C5
Gold medal – first place	2018 Jakarta	Teams C2–5
Silver medal – second place	2022 Hangzhou	Singles C5
Bronze medal – third place	2010 Guangzhou	Singles C5
Asian Championships
Gold medal – first place	2005 Kuala Lumpur	Singles C5
Gold medal – first place	2005 Kuala Lumpur	Teams C4–5
Gold medal – first place	2007 Seoul	Teams C4–5
Gold medal – first place	2011 Hong Kong	Singles C5
Gold medal – first place	2011 Hong Kong	Teams C4–5
Gold medal – first place	2013 Beijing	Singles C5
Gold medal – first place	2013 Beijing	Teams C4–5
Gold medal – first place	2015 Amman	Singles C5
Gold medal – first place	2015 Amman	Teams C4–5
Gold medal – first place	2019 Taichung	Singles C5
Gold medal – first place	2019 Taichung	Teams C5
Silver medal – second place	2007 Seoul	Singles C5
Bronze medal – third place	2007 Seoul	Open singles in wheelchair

Zhang Bian
- Traditional Chinese: 張變
- Simplified Chinese: 张变
Transcriptions
Standard Mandarin
- Hanyu Pinyin: Zhāng Biàn

Zhang Bian (Chinese: 张变, born 29 August 1986) is a Chinese para table tennis player. She has won eight gold medals from five Paralympic Games (2008, 2012, 2016, 2020 and 2024).

== Personal life ==
Like many of her teammates, Zhang was a polio survivor from Pizhou who attended New Hope Center as a child. That's where coach Heng Xin developed her into a star.
