= Iliesa Delana =

Fijian Paralympic athlete

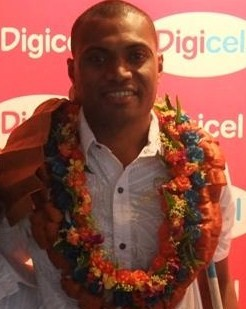
- Minister for Youth and Sports

Personal information
- Born: 2 December 1984 (age 41)

Sport
- Country: Fiji
- Sport: Athletics
- Event: High Jump - F42

Achievements and titles
- Paralympic finals: 2012 Summer Paralympics: High Jump (F42) – Gold
Medal record
Men's athletics
Representing Fiji
Paralympic Games
Gold medal – first place	2012 London	High Jump (F42)
IPC Athletics World Championships
Silver medal – second place	2011 Christchurch	Men's High Jump (F42)

Iliesa Delana MOF (born 2 December 1984) is a Fijian politician and Paralympic high jumper who has been Member of the Parliament of Fiji and Cabinet Minister since 17 September 2014. He was the first Fijian athlete to win a medal, gold in high jump, for Fiji at the Paralympics.

== Early life ==
Delana was born in Naisausau, Namara, Tailevu, Fiji. He lost his left leg in a bus accident at age three. He debuted at the FESPIC Games in 2006, and has since won silver medal at the 2011 IPC Athletics World Championships, held in New Zealand, and then a gold medal at the 2012 Summer Paralympics.

== 2012 Paralympics ==
Delana competed in the F42 category (for single leg amputees without prosthesis) at the 2012 Summer Paralympics. Going into the games, Delana was ranked number 2 in the world, but jumped 1.74m to win the gold on count back, after clearing all heights up to and including 1.74m on his first attempts. His jump of 1.74m broke the Oceanic record for the event.

In doing this, Delana became the first Fijian to win any medal at the Paralympics (or Olympics), and the first athlete from the South Pacific Islands to win gold (following Francis Kompaon's silver medal for Papua New Guinea in sprinting in 2008).

Delana was congratulated by President Ratu Epeli Nailatikau, and by Prime Minister Voreqe Bainimarama who called upon all Fijians to celebrate his victory. Upon his return to Fiji, Delana was welcomed by thousands of people (in the rain) for national celebrations which included a procession through the main street of Suva and "military and traditional ceremonies of welcome, [normally] only accorded to Heads of States". Delana was invited to inspect a fifty-strong honour guard. President Nailatikau delivered a speech describing Delana as a national "icon", adding that he had brought to the country a "sense of unity and pride [...] greatly needed at this point in time and in pursuit towards democratic governance", in the context of constitutional change following the 2006 military coup and plans for the restoration of democracy in 2014. The government announced that it would be building him a new house, to be completed before Christmas, as a gift and "token of appreciation from the Fijian Government and from all Fijians". He was presented with a new home by Prime Minister Bainimarama in January 2013, as "a token of appreciation to convey Fiji's profound gratitude for the great honour [Delana had] bestowed upon the country".

He is depicted on the obverse of the Fijian 2013 circulating commemorative 50 Cents coin.

== Political career ==
Delana stood in the 2014 general elections for the FijiFirst party, and was elected to Parliament with 906 votes. He was subsequently appointed to cabinet as Assistant Minister for Youth and Sports.
