= Jung Ji-nam =

South Korean table tennis player (born 1964)

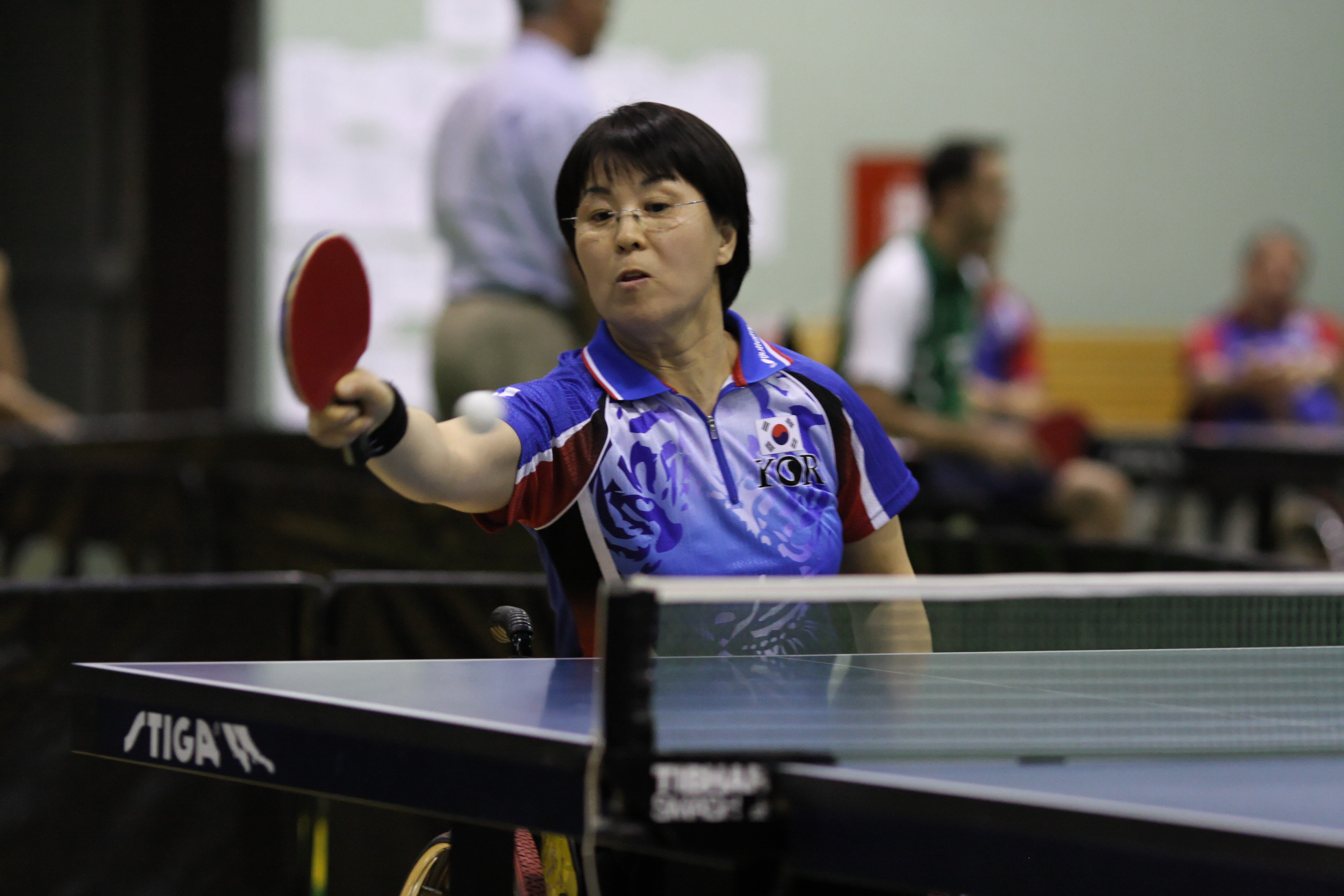
- Jung in 2012

Personal information
- Born: 20 January 1964 (age 62)

Sport
- Sport: Para table tennis
Medal record
Representing South Korea
Paralympic Games
Bronze medal – third place	2012 London	Teams C4-5
Asian Para Games
Silver medal – second place	2010 Guangzhou	Teams C4-5
Silver medal – second place	2014 Incheon	Teams C4-5
World Championships
Gold medal – first place	2010 Gwangju	Teams C4
Asian Championships
Silver medal – second place	2007 Seoul	Singles C4
Silver medal – second place	2009 Amman	Singles C4
Silver medal – second place	2011 Hong Kong	Teams C4-5
Silver medal – second place	2013 Beijing	Teams C4-5
Silver medal – second place	2015 Amman	Teams C4-5
Bronze medal – third place	2009 Amman	Teams C4-5
Bronze medal – third place	2013 Beijing	Singles C4

Jung Ji-nam (born 20 January 1964) is a South Korean former para table tennis player who competed in international table tennis competitions. She is a Paralympic bronze medalist, World champion and five-time Asian silver medalist in team events.
