= Valeria Zorzetto =

Italian para table tennis player (born 1969)

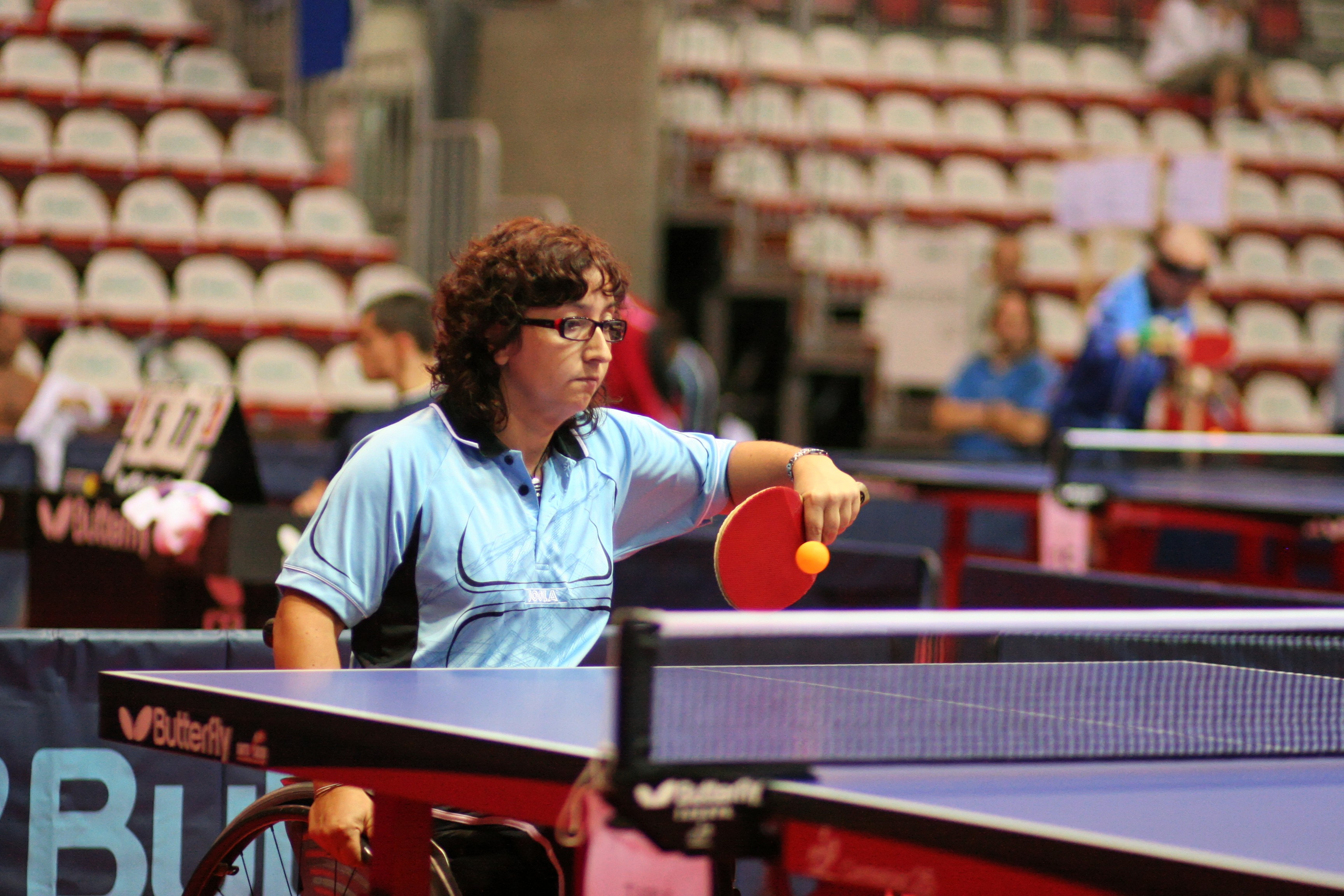

Personal information
- Nationality: Italian
- Born: 21 April 1969 (age 57) Vicenza, Italy

Sport
- Country: Italy
- Sport: Para table tennis
- Club: H81 Insieme Vicenza Onlus
- Coached by: Alessandro Arcigli
Medal record
Women's para table tennis
Representing Italy
Event / 1st / 2nd / 3rd; Paralympic Games / 0 / 1 / 0
Paralympic Games
Silver medal – second place	2004 Athens	Individual class 4
World Championships
Bronze medal – third place	2006 Montreaux	Team class 4

Valeria Zorzetto (born 21 April 1969 in Vicenza) is an Italian para table tennis player who won a silver medal at the 2004 Summer Paralympics.

== Biography ==
During her career she has participated in three editions of the Paralympic Games.

== See also ==
- Italy at the 2012 Summer Paralympics
