= Kimie Bessho =

Japanese para table tennis player

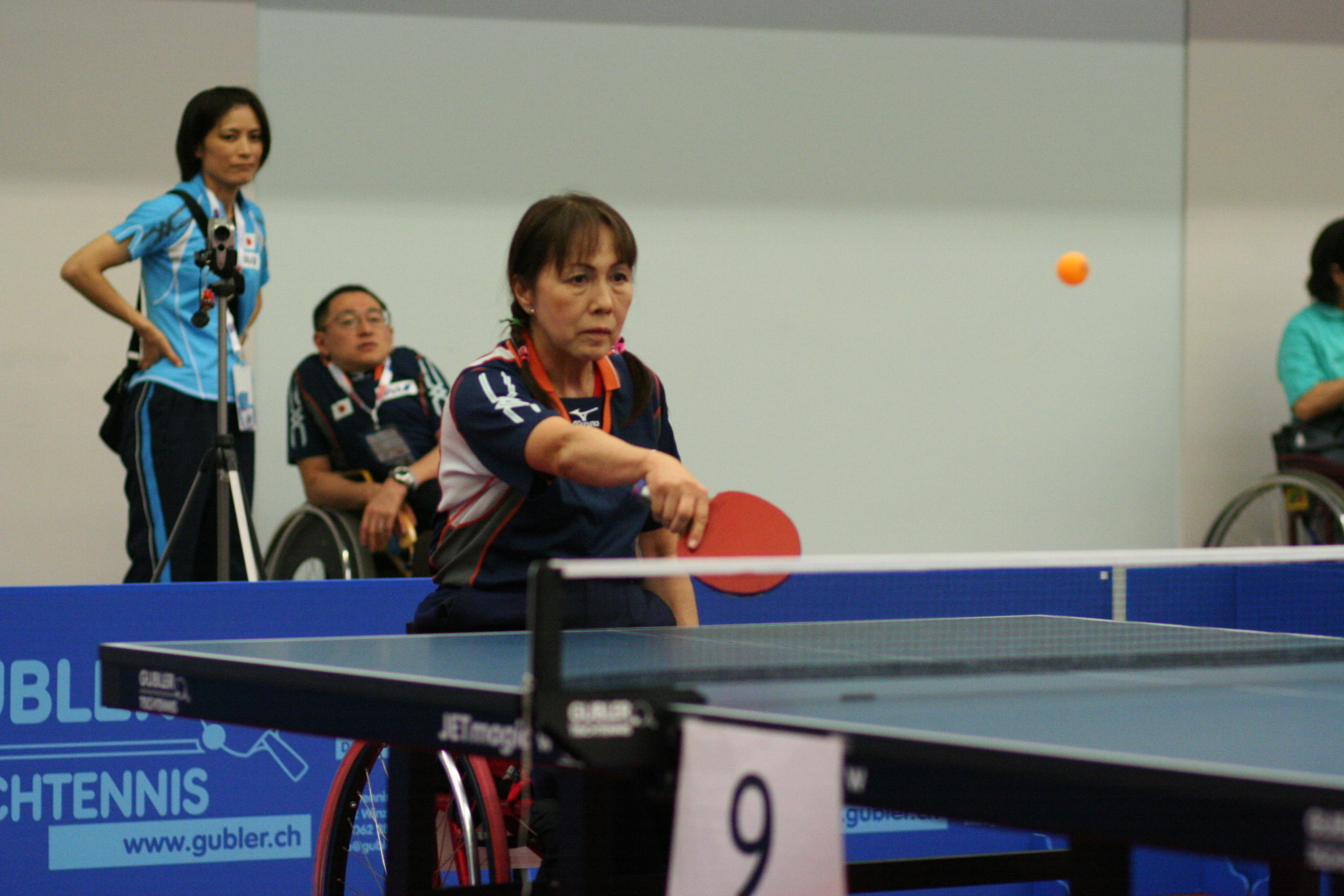
- Bessho at 2006 World Championships

Personal information
- Nickname: Shiny
- Born: 8 December 1947 (age 78) Hiroshima, Japan
- Height: 1.60 m (5 ft 3 in)
- Weight: 53 kg (117 lb)

Sport
- Country: Japan
- Sport: Para table tennis
- Disability class: C5
- Club: Domani Table Tennis Club
Medal record
Para table tennis
Representing Japan
Asian Championships
Silver medal – second place	2017 Beijing	Women's singles C5
Bronze medal – third place	2009 Amman	Women's singles C5
Asian Para Games
Bronze medal – third place	2014 Incheon	Women's singles C5

Kimie Bessho (別所キミヱ, Bessho Kimie, born 8 December 1947) is a Japanese para table tennis player who competes in international level events. She was a bronze medallist at the 2014 Asian Para Games and has participated at the Summer Paralympics four times, she was also one of the oldest participants to compete at the 2016 Summer Paralympics aged 68 years old. She is often known to wear butterfly hairclips as a superstition for her tournament matches and is referred to as "The Butterfly Lady".

== Background ==
Bessho grew up in Hiroshima, Japan as one of eight children.

When Bessho was 39, her husband died from a short illness and two years later, she was diagnosed with cancer and had to use a wheelchair indefinitely after two operations. She was told at that time that she only had three years to live. Bessho began playing table tennis at the age of 45 after being fascinated by the sport and made her debut appearance at the 2004 Summer Paralympics finishing in fifth place. In 2018, she was injured in two more car accidents, but has continued to play table tennis.

== Career records ==
- 2015 German Open: Singles: 3rd Place
- 2016 Japan Open: 1st Place
- 2016 Slovakia Open: 3rd Place
- 2016 8th Para Table Tennis Championships: 1st Place
- 2016 Paralympic Games 5th Place
- 2017 Asian Para Table Tennis Championships (Beijing): 2nd Place
- 2017 9th Para Table Tennis Championships: 1st Place
- 2017 Thailand Open: 2nd Place
