= Jung Young-a =

South Korean para table tennis player

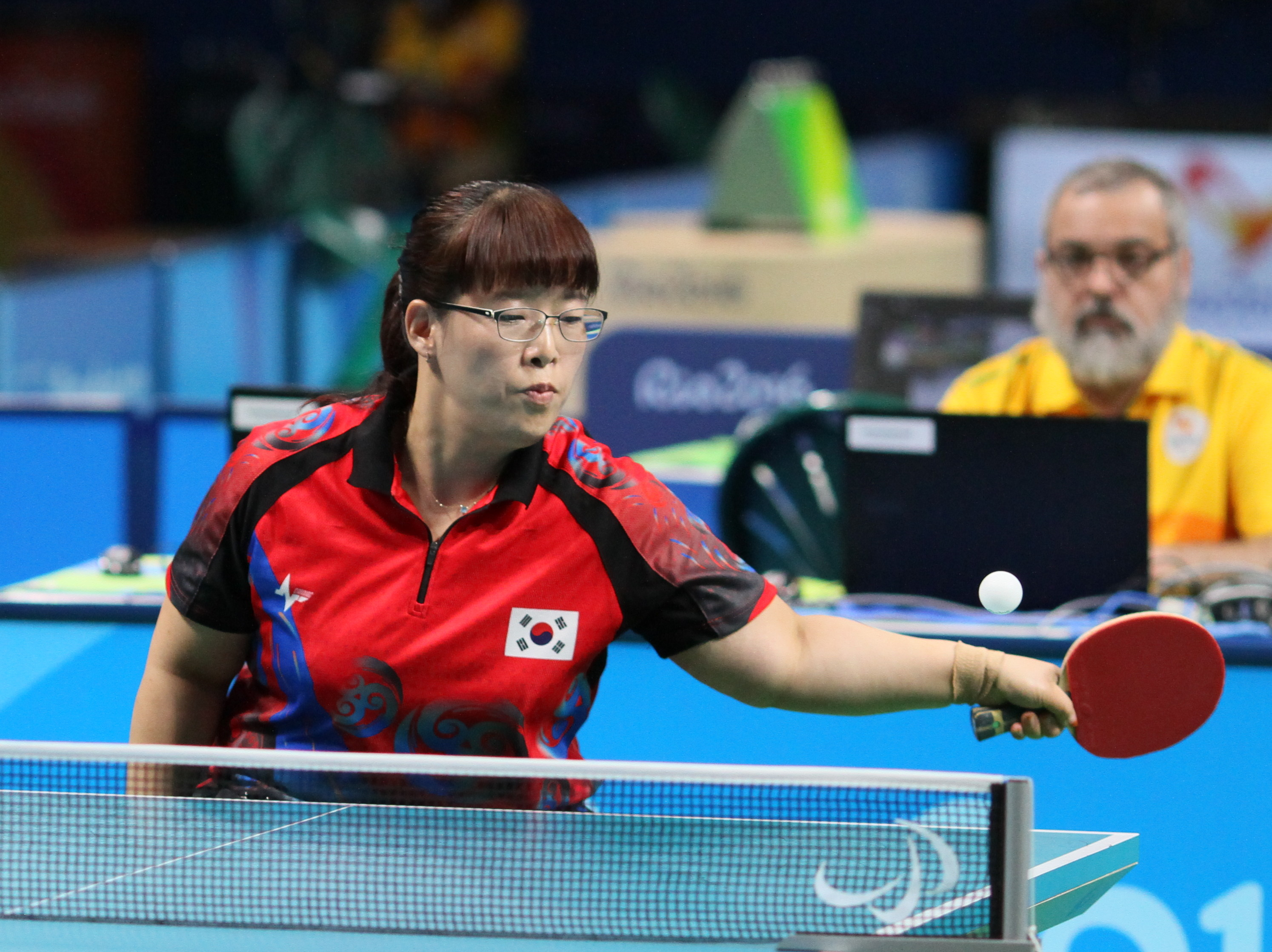
- Jung at the 2016 Summer Paralympics

Personal information
- Born: 20 July 1979 (age 47) South Korea
- Height: 160 cm (5 ft 3 in)
- Weight: 54 kg (119 lb)

Sport
- Sport: Table tennis
- Playing style: Left-handed shakehand grip
- Disability class: 5
- Highest ranking: 2 (October 2017)
- Current ranking: 4 (February 2020)
Medal record
Women's para table tennis
Representing South Korea
Paralympic Games
Bronze medal – third place	2012 London	Teams C4–5
Bronze medal – third place	2016 Rio de Janeiro	Singles C5
Bronze medal – third place	2016 Rio de Janeiro	Teams C4–5
Bronze medal – third place	2024 Paris	Singles C5
Bronze medal – third place	2024 Paris	Doubles WD10
World Championships
Bronze medal – third place	2014 Beijing	Singles C5
Asian Para Games
Silver medal – second place	2010 Guangzhou	Teams C4–5
Silver medal – second place	2014 Incheon	Singles C5
Silver medal – second place	2014 Incheon	Teams C4–5
Asian Championships
Gold medal – first place	2017 Beijing	Singles C5
Gold medal – first place	2017 Beijing	Teams C4–5
Silver medal – second place	2011 Hong Kong	Teams C4–5
Silver medal – second place	2013 Beijing	Teams C4–5
Silver medal – second place	2015 Amman	Teams C4–5
Bronze medal – third place	2009 Amman	Teams C4–5
Bronze medal – third place	2013 Beijing	Singles C5
Bronze medal – third place	2015 Amman	Singles C5

Korean name
- Hangul: 정영아
- RR: Jeong Yeonga
- MR: Chŏng Yŏnga

Jung Young-a (Korean: 정영아; born 20 July 1979) is a South Korean para table tennis player. She won a bronze medal at the 2012 Summer Paralympics and two bronze medals at the 2016 Summer Paralympics.

== Career ==
She also competed in wheelchair curling, and represented South Korea at the 2011 World Wheelchair Curling Championship.

== Personal life ==
Her disability was caused by a fall during a mountain-climbing trip with friends in 2002.
