= Caroline Tabib =

Israeli para table tennis player (born 1996)

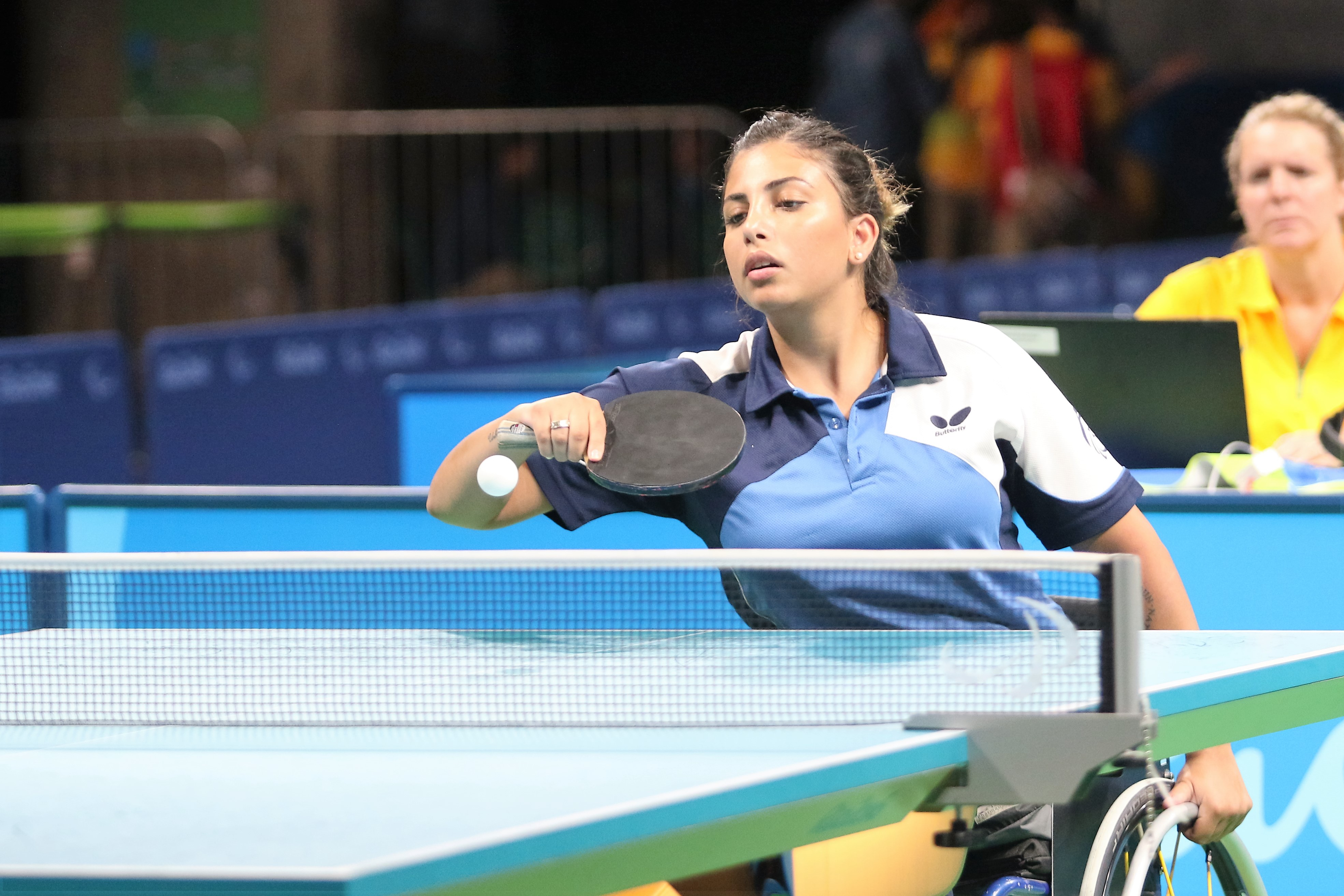

Personal information
- Native name: קרולין טביב
- Born: 25 August 1996 (age 29) Tel Aviv, Israel

Sport
- Sport: Para table tennis
Medal record
Representing Israel
World Championships
Bronze medal – third place	2018 Lasko	Singles C5
European Championships
Bronze medal – third place	2015 Vejle	Singles C4-5

Caroline Odaia Tabib (Hebrew: קרולין טביב; born 25 August 1996) is an Israeli para table tennis player who competes in international table tennis competitions. She is a World and European bronze medalist. She competed at the 2016 and 2020 Summer Paralympics where she did not win a medal.
