= Ingela Lundbäck =

Swedish para table tennis player

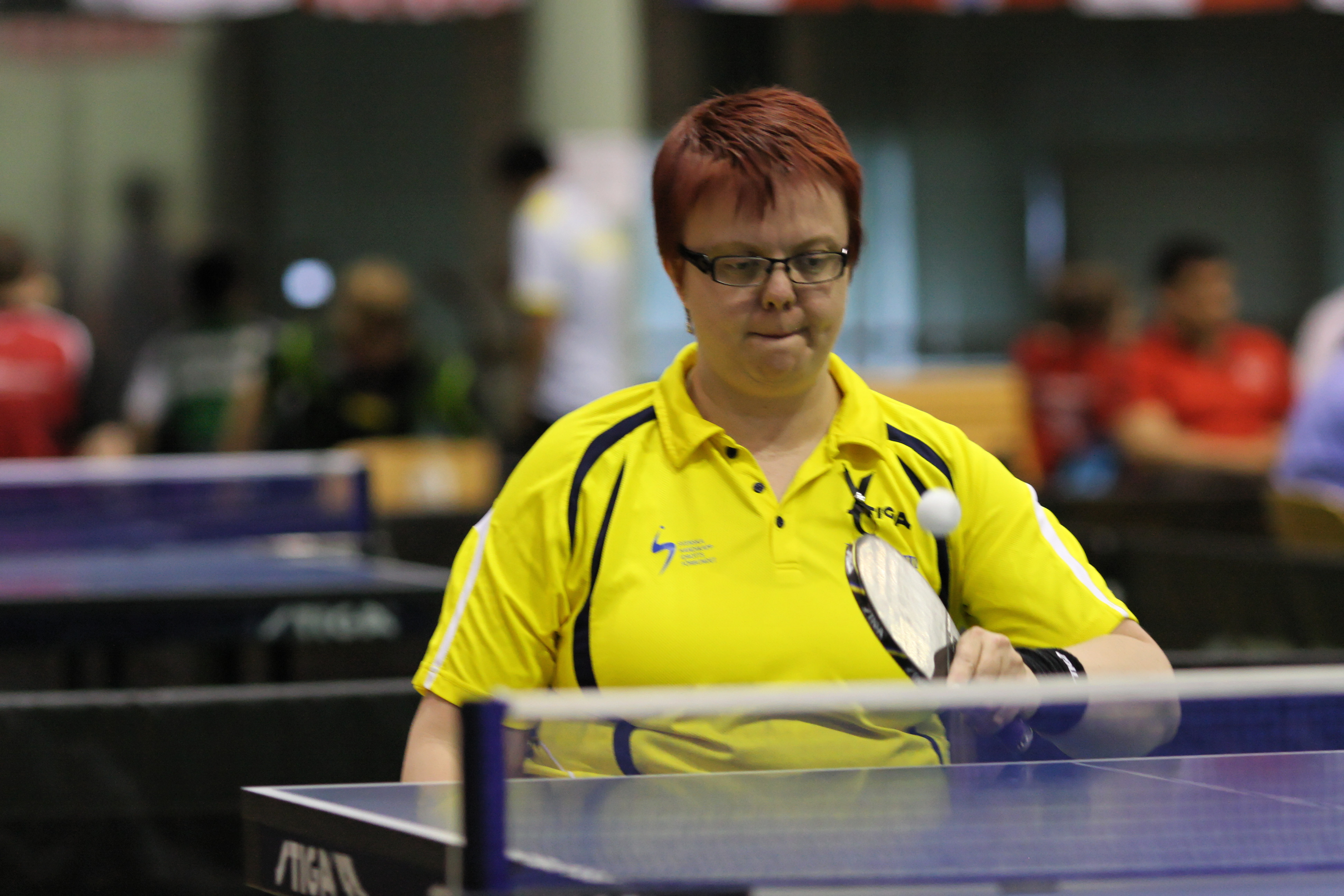

Personal information
- Born: 11 May 1975 (age 51) Luleå, Sweden

Sport
- Country: Sweden
- Sport: Para table tennis
- Disability: Gorlin's syndrome
- Disability class: C5
Medal record
Para table tennis
Representing Sweden
Paralympic Games
Silver medal – second place	2012 London	Women's team C4-5
Silver medal – second place	2020 Tokyo	Women's team C4–5
Bronze medal – third place	2012 London	Women's singles C5
World Championships
Silver medal – second place	2010 Gwangju	Women's singles C5
Silver medal – second place	2010 Gwangju	Women's team C5
Silver medal – second place	2014 Beijing	Women's team C5
Silver medal – second place	2018 Lasko	Women's singles C5
Bronze medal – third place	2014 Beijing	Women's singles C5
European Championships
Gold medal – first place	2005 Jesolo	Women's open singles
Gold medal – first place	2005 Jesolo	Women's singles C5
Gold medal – first place	2007 Kranjska Gora	Women's open singles
Gold medal – first place	2009 Genoa	Women's singles C5
Gold medal – first place	2009 Genoa	Women's teams C4-5
Gold medal – first place	2011 Split	Women's singles C4-5
Gold medal – first place	2015 Vejle	Women's teams C4-5
Silver medal – second place	2007 Kranjska Gora	Women's singles C5
Silver medal – second place	2011 Split	Women's team C4-5
Silver medal – second place	2019 Helsingborg	Women's team C4-5
Bronze medal – third place	2007 Kranjska Gora	Women's teams C5
Bronze medal – third place	2013 Lignano	Women's singles C4-5
Bronze medal – third place	2015 Vejle	Women's singles C4-5
Bronze medal – third place	2019 Helsingborg	Women's singles C4-5

Ingela Kristina Lundbäck (born 11 May 1975) is a Swedish para table tennis player. She won a silver medal and bronze medal at the 2012 Summer Paralympics. She won a silver medal in Team C4–5, at the 2020 Summer Paralympics.

She is a seven time European para table tennis champion in both singles events and team events alongside Anna-Carin Ahlquist.
