= Chinese Taipei at the 2004 Summer Paralympics =

- Chinese Taipei Paralympic flag
- IPC code: TPE
- NPC: Chinese Taipei Paralympic Committee

in Athens
- Competitors: 18 in 7 sports
- Medals Ranked 44th: Gold 2 Silver 2 Bronze 2 Total 6

Summer Paralympics appearances (overview)
- 1992; 1996; 2000; 2004; 2008; 2012; 2016; 2020; 2024

Chinese Taipei competed at the 2004 Summer Paralympics in Athens, Greece.

== Medalists ==
Medal	Name	Sport	Event
Gold	Chiang Chih Chung	Athletics	Men's javelin throw F13
Gold	Lin Tzu-hui	Powerlifting	Women's −75 kg
Silver	Lin Chin-mei	Shooting	Women's air pistol SH1
Silver	Hsiao Shu Chin; Wei Mei-hui	Table tennis	Women's teams class 4–5
Bronze	Hsu Chih Shan; Hu Ming Fu	Table tennis	Men's teams class 9
Bronze	Wei Mei-hui	Table tennis	Women's singles class 5

== Sports ==
=== Archery ===
Athlete	Event	Ranking round		Round of 32	Round of 16	Quarterfinals	Semifinals	Finals	
Athlete	Event	Score	Seed	Opposition score	Opposition score	Opposition score	Opposition score	Opposition score	Rank
Tseng Lung Hui	Men's individual W2	620	4	Carrubba (ITA); W 155-126	Candela (ESP); W 152-150	Jung (KOR); L 87-92	did not advance		

=== Athletics ===
==== Men's field ====
Athlete	Class	Event	Final		
Athlete	Class	Event	Result	Points	Rank
Chen Chia Hsiang	F42	Javelin	39.21	-	10
Chen Chia Hsiang	F42	Shot put	7.59	-	11
Chiang Chih Chung	F13	Javelin	59.38 WR	-	1st place, gold medalist(s)

=== Judo ===
==== Men ====
Athlete	Event	Preliminary	Quarterfinals	Semifinals	Repechage round 1	Repechage round 2	Final/ Bronze medal contest
Athlete	Event	Opposition Result	Opposition Result	Opposition Result	Opposition Result	Opposition Result	Opposition Result
Lee Ching Cheng	Men's 66kg	Xu (CHN); W 0120S-0013	Brannon (USA); W 1000-0000	Garcia del Valle (ESP); L 0000-0200	—		Kallunki (FIN); L 0000-1000
Lee Ching Chung	Men's 60kg	Biro (HUN); W 1000-0000	Fargeau (FRA); W 0200C–0020	Perez (CUB); WO	—		Zasyadkovych (UKR); L 0000-1000

=== Powerlifting ===
==== Women ====
Athlete	Event	Result	Rank
Lin Tzu-hui	75kg	137.5	1st place, gold medalist(s)
Lin Ya Hsuan	56kg	77.5	7
Lu Li Hua	40kg	DSQ	

=== Shooting ===
==== Men ====
Athlete	Event	Qualification		Final		
Athlete	Event	Score	Rank	Score	Total	Rank
Hsu Jui Jen	Men's 10m air pistol SH1	560	8 Q	94.4	654.4	7
Liu Wen Chang	Men's 10m air rifle standing SH1	576	15	did not advance		

==== Women ====
Athlete	Event	Qualification		Final		
Athlete	Event	Score	Rank	Score	Total	Rank
Huang Lin Li Cho	Women's 10m air rifle standing SH1	380	13	did not advance		
Lin Chin Mei	Women's 10m air pistol SH1	367	2 Q	98.1	465.1	2nd place, silver medalist(s)

=== Table tennis ===
==== Men ====
Athlete	Event	Preliminaries				Quarterfinals	Semifinals	Final / BM	
Athlete	Event	Opposition Result	Opposition Result	Opposition Result	Rank	Opposition Result	Opposition Result	Opposition Result	Rank
Hsu Chih Shan	Men's singles 9	Serignat (FRA); W 3–1	Gutdeutsch (AUT); W 3–1	Cinibulk (CZE); W 3–2	1 Q	Leibovitz (USA); W 0–0	did not advance		
Hsu Chih Shan; Hu Ming Fu	Men's teams 9	Netherlands (NED); L 1-3	Croatia (CRO); W 3-0	Iran (IRI); W 3-0	2 Q	—	Austria (AUT); L 1-3	United States (USA); W 3-2	3rd place, bronze medalist(s)

==== Women ====
Athlete	Event	Preliminaries				Quarterfinals	Semifinals	Final / BM	
Athlete	Event	Opposition Result	Opposition Result	Opposition Result	Rank	Opposition Result	Opposition Result	Opposition Result	Rank
Hsiao Shu Chin	Women's singles 5	Chen (CHN); L 1–3	Palasse (FRA); W 3–1	Chan (HKG); L 2–3	3	did not advance			
Wei Mei-hui	Women's singles 5	Ren (CHN); L 0-3	Abuawad (JOR); W 3-0	—	2 Q	Hoffmann (MEX); W 3-1	Chen (CHN); L 2-3	Pivarciova (CZE); W 3-2	3rd place, bronze medalist(s)
Hsiao Shu Chin; Wei Mei-hui	Women's teams 4-5	Jordan (JOR); W 3-0	Germany (GER); W 3-0	—	1 Q	—	France (FRA); W 3-0	China (CHN); L 0-3	2nd place, silver medalist(s)

=== Wheelchair tennis ===
==== Men ====
Athlete	Class	Event	Round of 64	Round of 32	Round of 16	Quarterfinals	Semifinals	Finals
Athlete	Class	Event	Opposition Result	Opposition Result	Opposition Result	Opposition Result	Opposition Result	Opposition Result
Yu Lin Chen	Open	Men's singles	Mendez (CHI); L 6–4, 4–6, 0-6	did not advance				

==== Women ====
Athlete	Class	Event	Round of 32	Round of 16	Quarterfinals	Semifinals	Finals
Athlete	Class	Event	Opposition Result	Opposition Result	Opposition Result	Opposition Result	Opposition Result
Pi Wen Lu	Open	Women's singles	Dorsett (USA); W 7–6, 5–7, 6-3	Vergeer (NED); L 0–6, 0–6	did not advance		

== See also ==
- Chinese Taipei at the 2004 Summer Olympics
