= Chinese Taipei at the 2012 Summer Paralympics =

- Chinese Taipei Paralympic flag
- IPC code: TPE
- NPC: Chinese Taipei Paralympic Committee

in London
- Competitors: 18 in 7 sports
- Flag bearer: Lin Wen-Hsin
- Medals Ranked 63rd: Gold 0 Silver 1 Bronze 2 Total 3

Summer Paralympics appearances (overview)
- 1992; 1996; 2000; 2004; 2008; 2012; 2016; 2020; 2024

Chinese Taipei sent a delegation to compete at the 2012 Summer Paralympics in London. The team was composed of 18 competitors.

== Medalists ==
Medal	Name	Sport	Event	Date
Silver	Lee Kai-lin	Judo	Women's -48kg	30 August
Bronze	Tseng Lung Hui	Archery	Men's ind. recurve W1/W2	3 September
Bronze	Tzu-Hui Lin	Powerlifting	Women's 75 kg	3 September

== Archery ==
- Records tumbled as Tseng Lung Hui got 650 points in the ranking round of Ind. recurve W1/W2, renewing the Paralympic record held by Korea's LEE Myeong-Gu, who ended up 6th place this year. Later on, Tseng claimed his second bronze medal at the end of the knockout stage. He attained his first Paralympic bronze medal at the Beijing Paralympics.

Men

Athlete	Event	Ranking round		Round of 32	Round of 16	Quarterfinals	Semifinals	Finals	
Athlete	Event	Score	Seed	Opposition score	Opposition score	Opposition score	Opposition score	Opposition score	Rank
Hua Chen Chung	Ind. recurve W1/W2	537	23	Ozen (TUR) (10); L 2–6	did not advance				
Tseng Lung Hui	Ind. recurve W1/W2	650 PR	1	Bye	Demir (TUR) (17); W 6–2	Browne (GBR) (9); W 6–4	de Pellegrin (ITA) (4); L 3–7	Bronze Medal Match; Ranjbarkivaj (IRI) (2); W 7–3	3rd place, bronze medalist(s)
Ching Jen Yang	Ind. recurve standing	581	20	Kopiy (UKR) (13); L 5–6	did not advance				
Hua Chen Chung; Lung Hui Tseng; Ching Jen Yang	Team recurve	1768	8	—N/a	Ukraine (UKR) (9); W 194–183	Great Britain (GBR) (1); L 179–195	did not advance		

== Athletics ==
Men's field events

Athlete	Event	Distance	Rank
Chiang Chih-chung	Javelin Throw F12-13	56.51	5
Liang Keng-chin	Triple Jump F12	13.60	8

Women's track and road events

Athlete	Event	Heat		Final	
Athlete	Event	Result	Rank	Result	Rank
Liu Ya-ting	100m T13	14:22	6 PB	did not advance	

Women's field events

- The 2012 Summer Paralympics is the first ever Paralympic Games to include javelin throw competition for visually-impaired women. In this event, even though Chinese Taipei's Liu Ya-Ting finishes 5th, she still holds the Paralympic record of F13, given that the top four players are all F12 athletes.

Athlete	Event	Distance	Rank
Liu Ya-ting	Javelin Throw F12-13	33.65 PR	5
Tung Ting-fen	Javelin Throw F12-13	21.12 PB	9

== Judo ==
Athlete	Event	Quarterfinals	Semifinals	Repechage semifinals	Final	
Athlete	Event	Opposition result	Opposition result	Opposition result	Opposition result	Rank
Kai-Lin Lee	Women's 48 kg	Laclau (FRA); W 010–0001	Cardoso (BRA); W 0002–0001	—N/a	Brussig (GER); L 0001–001	2nd place, silver medalist(s)

== Powerlifting ==
- Two-time winner of the women's – 75 kg weight class, powerlifter Lin Tzu-Hui aimed to claim her third Paralympic gold, but proved in vain. With potent competitors from China and Nigeria both breaking the records in their additional attempts, Lin failed to overcome the record she set for herself – 137.5 kg. She ended up as the bronze medalist with her first attempt, a lift of 137 kg.

Women

Athlete	Event	Result	Rank
Ya-Hsuan Lin	60 kg	NMR	
Tzu-Hui Lin	75 kg	137	3rd place, bronze medalist(s)

== Shooting ==
Athlete	Event	Qualification		Final	
Athlete	Event	Score	Rank	Score	Rank
Wen-Chang Liu	Men's 50m Rifle 3 Positions SH1	1098	24	did not advance	
Wen-Chang Liu	Men's 10m Air Rifle Standing SH1	576	21	did not advance	
Wen-Chang Liu	Mixed 50m Rifle Prone SH1	576	33	did not advance	
Wen-Chang Liu	Mixed 10m Air Rifle Prone SH1	599	14	did not advance	

== Swimming ==
Women

Athletes	Event	Heat		Final	
Athletes	Event	Time	Rank	Time	Rank
Alice Hsiao Hung Luo	100m freestyle S6	1:34.31	19	did not advance	
Alice Hsiao Hung Luo	100m breaststroke SB4	2:06.80	7 Q	2:06.05	7
Alice Hsiao Hung Luo	200m individual medley SM5	4:32.59	11	did not advance	
Jo-Lin Tu	200m freestyle S14	2:43.29	20	did not advance	
Jo-Lin Tu	100m breaststroke SB14	1:40.49	17	did not advance	

== Table tennis ==
Men

Athlete	Event	Group Stage			Round of 16	Quarterfinals	Semifinals	Final	
Athlete	Event	Opposition result	Opposition result	Rank	Opposition result	Opposition result	Opposition result	Opposition result	Rank
Kun-Nan Ko	Individual C4	Martin (FRA); L 0–3	Kim (KOR); L 0–3	3	—N/a	did not advance			
Wen-Hsin Lin	Individual C4	Ozturk (TUR); L 1–3	Mészáros (SVK); W 3–1	2	—N/a	did not advance			
Yen-Hung Lin	Individual C5	Jung (KOR); L 2–3	Fetir (EGY); W 3–2	2	—N/a		did not advance		
Kun-Nan Ko; Wen-Hsin Lin; Yen-Hung Lin	Team C4-5	—N/a			Bye	Egypt (EGY); W 3–1	South Korea (KOR); L 0–3	Bronze Medal Match; France (FRA); L 0–3	4

Women

- Runners-up at the 2004 Paralympics and bronze medalists at the 2000 Games, Hsiao Shu-Chin and Wei Mei-Hui participated in the Women's Team C4-5 games for the third time. They were seeded number 8 this year and had to start from the first round, where they lost 2–3 to their Italian opponents and came in last in the tournament. Wei was also a bronze medalist in the Women's Individual C5 event at the 2004 Paralympics.

Athlete	Event	Group Stage			Round of 16	Quarterfinals	Semifinals	Final	
Athlete	Event	Opposition result	Opposition result	Rank	Opposition result	Opposition result	Opposition result	Opposition result	Rank
Shu-Chin Hsiao	Individual C5	Lundback (SWE); L 2–3	Wong (HKG); W 3–2	2	—N/a		did not advance		
Mei-Hui Wei	Individual C5	Gu (CHN); L 0–3	Nardelli (ITA); W 3–0	2	—N/a		did not advance		
Shu-Chin Hsiao; Mei-Hui Wei	Team C4-5	—N/a			Italy (ITA); L 2–3	did not advance			

== See also ==
- Chinese Taipei at the 2012 Summer Olympics
