= Myanmar at the Asian Para Games =

- IOC code: MYA
- NOC: Myanmar Paralympic Sports Federation
- Medals Ranked 28th: Gold 1 Silver 5 Bronze 11 Total 17

Asian Para Games appearances (overview)
- 2010; 2014; 2018; 2022

Myanmar competed in every Asian Para Games.Myanmar have won 17 overall medals at the Asian Para Games.

== Asian Para Games ==
Games	Gold	Silver	Bronze	Total
(China) Guangzhou 2010	0	0	1	1
(South Korea) Incheon 2014	1	1	5	7
(Indonesia) Jakarta 2018	0	4	2	6
(China) Hangzhou 2022	0	0	3	3
Total	1	5	11	17

Medals per sport

Sport Gold Silver Bronze Total

Athletics 1 0 1 2

Chess 0 2 0 2

Swimming 0 3 7 10

Total 1 5 8 14

Medals per year

Year Gold Silver Bronze Total

2018 0 4 2 6

2014 1 1 5 7

2010 0 0 1 1

Total 1 5 8 14

=== FESPIC Games ===
Games	Gold	Silver	Bronze	Total
(Japan) Oita 1975	3	1	0	4
(Australia) Parramatta 1977	16	15	1	32
Sha Tin 1982	4	3	4	11
(Japan) Kobe 1989	8	9	10	27
(China) Beijing 1994	4	7	14	25
(Thailand) Bangkok 1999	7	16	18	41
(South Korea) Busan 2002	4	13	4	21
(Malaysia) Kuala Lumpur 2006	6	3	6	15
Total	52	67	57	176

== Asian Youth Para Games ==
	Gold	Silver	Bronze	Total
(Malaysia) Kuala Lumpur 2013	3	4	4	11
Total	3	4	4	11

== ASEAN Para Games ==
Games	Gold	Silver	Bronze	Total
(Malaysia) Kuala Lumpur 2001	43	23	11	77
(Vietnam) Hanoi 2003	24	12	11	47
(Philippines) Manila 2005	29	13	4	46
(Thailand) Nakhon Ratchasima 2008	14	16	21	51
(Malaysia) Kuala Lumpur 2009	14	19	7	40
(Indonesia) Surakarta 2011	11	9	14	34
(Myanmar) Naypyidaw 2014	34	26	36	96
Singapore 2015	16	17	29	62
(Malaysia) Kuala Lumpur 2017	11	15	17	43
Total	196	150	150	496

== See also ==
- Myanmar at the Olympics
- Myanmar at the Paralympics
- Myanmar at the Asian Games
- Myanmar at the Southeast Asian Games
