= Chinese Taipei at the Paralympics =

Chinese Taipei at the Summer Paralympics
- Chinese Taipei Paralympic flag
- IPC code: TPE
- NPC: Chinese Taipei Paralympic Committee
- Medals Ranked 66th: Gold 5 Silver 9 Bronze 16 Total 30

Summer Paralympics appearances (overview)
- 1992; 1996; 2000; 2004; 2008; 2012; 2016; 2020; 2024

Taiwan, officially the Republic of China (ROC), competes as Chinese Taipei at the Paralympic Games. The ROC first participated at the Summer Paralympic Games in 1992 and has competed in every summer games since then. The nation has never participated in the Winter Paralympic Games. Chinese Taipei has a special Paralympic flag which it uses during the games.

== Medals ==
=== Medals by Summer Games ===
Games	Athletes	Gold	Silver	Bronze	Total	Rank
(Italy) Rome 1960	did not participate					
(Japan) Tokyo 1964	did not participate					
(Israel) Tel Aviv 1968	did not participate					
(West Germany) Heidelberg 1972	did not participate					
(Canada) Toronto 1976	did not participate					
(Netherlands) Arnhem 1980	did not participate					
(United States) New York 1984/ (United Kingdom) Stoke Mandeville 1984	did not participate					
(South Korea) Seoul 1988	did not participate					
(Spain) Barcelona 1992	11	0	0	1	1	55
(United States) Atlanta 1996	14	1	0	2	3	49
(Australia) Sydney 2000	25	1	2	4	7	44
(Greece) Athens 2004	18	2	2	2	6	44
(China) Beijing 2008	17	1	0	1	2	50
(United Kingdom) London 2012	18	0	1	2	3	63
(Brazil) Rio de Janeiro 2016	13	0	1	1	2	68
(Japan) Tokyo 2020	10	0	0	1	1	78
(France) Paris 2024	13	0	3	2	5	67
Total		5	9	16	30	66

=== Medals by Winter Games ===
Games	Athletes	Gold	Silver	Bronze	Total	Rank
(Sweden) Örnsköldsvik 1976	did not participate					
(Norway) Geilo 1980	did not participate					
(Austria) Innsbruck 1984	did not participate					
(Austria) Innsbruck 1988	did not participate					
(France) Albertville 1992	did not participate					
(Norway) Lillehammer 1994	did not participate					
(Japan) Nagano 1998	did not participate					
(United States) Salt Lake City 2002	did not participate					
(Italy) Turin 2006	did not participate					
(Canada) Vancouver 2010	did not participate					
(Russia) Sochi 2014	did not participate					
(South Korea) Pyeongchang 2018	did not participate					
(China) Beijing 2022	did not participate					
Total		0	0	0	0	−

=== Medals by Summer Sport ===
Sport	Gold	Silver	Bronze	Total
Powerlifting	2	0	3	5
Athletics	2	0	0	2
Judo	1	1	2	4
Table tennis	0	7	8	15
Shooting	0	1	0	1
Archery	0	0	2	2
Taekwondo	0	0	1	1
Totals (7 entries)	5	9	16	30

=== Medals by Winter Sport ===
Sport	Gold	Silver	Bronze	Total
Totals (0 entries)	0	0	0	0

== Medalists ==
Medal	Name	Games	Sport	Event
Gold	Chiang Chih-chung	2000 Sydney	Athletics	Men's javelin throw F13
Gold	Chiang Chih-chung	2004 Athens	Athletics	Men's javelin throw F13
Gold	Lee Ching-chung	1996 Atlanta	Judo	Men's 60 kg
Gold	Lin Tzu-hui	2004 Athens	Powerlifting	Women's 75 kg
Gold	Lin Tzu-hui	2008 Beijing	Powerlifting	Women's 75 kg
Silver	Lee Kai-lin	2012 London	Judo	Women's 48 kg
Silver	Lin Chin-mei	2004 Athens	Shooting	Women's air pistol SH1
Silver	Chou Chang-shen	2000 Sydney	Table tennis	Men's singles class 5
Silver	Chou Chang-shen; Lin Yen-hung	2000 Sydney	Table tennis	Men's team class 5
Silver	Hsiao Shu-chin; Wei Mei-hui	2004 Athens	Table tennis	Women's team class 4–5
Silver	Cheng Ming-chih; Lin Yen-hung	2016 Rio de Janeiro	Table tennis	Men's team class 4–5
Silver	Lin Tzu-yu; Tien Shiau-wen	2024 Paris	Table tennis	Women's double class 2
Silver	Cheng Ming-chih	2024 Paris	Table tennis	Men's singles class 5
Silver	Chen Po-yen	2024 Paris	Table tennis	Men's singles class 11
Bronze	Tseng Lung-hui	2012 London	Archery	Men's individual recurve W1/W2
Bronze	Tseng Lung-hui	2008 Beijing	Archery	Men's individual recurve W1/W2
Bronze	Lin Der-chang	1992 Barcelona	Judo	Men's 86 kg
Bronze	Lee Ching-chung	2000 Sydney	Judo	Men's 60 kg
Bronze	Lin Tzu-hui	2012 London	Powerlifting	Women's 75 kg
Bronze	Lin Tzu-hui	2016 Rio de Janeiro	Powerlifting	Women's 79 kg
Bronze	Lu Li-hua	2000 Sydney	Powerlifting	Women's 44 kg
Bronze	Chou Chang-shen	1996 Atlanta	Table tennis	Men's singles class 5
Bronze	Hsu Chih-shan	1996 Atlanta	Table tennis	Men's open class 6–10
Bronze	Hou Ting-sung; Hsu Chih-shan; Hu Ming-fu; Lin Hsiu-hsien	2000 Sydney	Table tennis	Men's team class 9
Bronze	Wei Mei-hui; Liao Min-hsiu; Hsiao Shu-chin	2000 Sydney	Table tennis	Women's team class 4–5
Bronze	Hsu Chih-shan; Hu Ming-fu	2004 Athens	Table tennis	Men's team class 9
Bronze	Wei Mei-hui	2004 Athens	Table tennis	Women's singles class 5
Bronze	Tien Shiau-wen	2020 Tokyo	Table tennis	Women's singles class 10
Bronze	Xiao Xiang-wen	2024 Paris	Taekwondo	Men's 58 kg
Bronze	Tien Shiau-wen	2024 Paris	Table tennis	Women's singles class 10

== See also ==
- Chinese Taipei at the Olympics
