= Chinese Taipei at the 2000 Summer Paralympics =

- Chinese Taipei Paralympic flag
- IPC code: TPE
- NPC: Chinese Taipei Paralympic Committee

in Sydney
- Competitors: 25
- Medals Ranked 44th: Gold 1 Silver 2 Bronze 4 Total 7

Summer Paralympics appearances (overview)
- 1992; 1996; 2000; 2004; 2008; 2012; 2016; 2020; 2024

Chinese Taipei competed at the 2000 Summer Paralympics in Sydney, Australia. The country took a gold medal won by Chiang Chih Chung in the men's F13 javelin throw event. Chih threw a distance of 57.28 metres to win the competition and broke the world record in the process. The Chinese Taipei team also won two silvers and two bronze medals in table tennis.

== Medallists ==
Medal	Name	Sport	Event
Gold	Chih Chung Chiang	Athletics	Men's javelin F13
Silver	Chang Shen Chou	Table tennis	Men's singles 5
Silver	Chang Shen Chou; Yen Hung Lin	Table tennis	Men's team 5
Bronze	Ching Chung Lee	Judo	Men's -60 kg
Bronze	Li Hua Lu	Powerlifting	Women's -44 kg
Bronze	Ting Sung Hou; Chih Shan Hsu; Ming Fu Hu; Hsiu Hsien Lin	Table tennis	Men's teams 9
Bronze	Mei Hui Wei; Min Hsiu Liao; Shu Chin Hsiao	Table tennis	Women's teams 4-5

== See also ==
- Chinese Taipei at the 2000 Summer Olympics
- Chinese Taipei at the Paralympics
