= Chinese Taipei at the 2008 Summer Paralympics =

- Chinese Taipei Paralympic flag
- IPC code: TPE
- NPC: Chinese Taipei Paralympic Committee

in Beijing
- Competitors: 17 in 6 sports
- Flag bearer: Hou Ting Sung
- Medals Ranked 50th: Gold 1 Silver 0 Bronze 1 Total 2

Summer Paralympics appearances (overview)
- 1992; 1996; 2000; 2004; 2008; 2012; 2016; 2020; 2024

Chinese Taipei competed at the 2008 Summer Paralympics in Beijing, China. The delegation consisted of seventeen competitors in six sports: archery, track and field athletics, powerlifting, shooting, swimming, and table tennis. The athletes were ten men and seven women ranging in age from 27 to 53 years old.

"Chinese Taipei" is the delegation name used since 1979 by athletes from Taiwan and the Taiwan Area at the Olympic and Paralympic Games. Thus, Chinese Taipei's participation in the Beijing Paralympics did not contradict the One China policy and was not objected to by the People's Republic of China.

As in previous editions of the Summer Paralympics, the flag of the Republic of China was not displayed. Instead, the Chinese Taipei Paralympic flag was used when Taiwanese athletes won medals. When Lin Tzu-hui of Chinese Taipei won a gold medal, the National Banner Song, not the National Anthem of the Republic of China, was played at the medal ceremony.

Three days before the beginning of the Games, the Taipei Times reported that two of Chinese Taipei's star athletes, double Paralympic champion Chiang Chih-chung and world athletics champion Chen Ming-tsai, had been barred from attending by the International Paralympic Committee. The Times added that no reason had been given for the ban, even after the Chinese Taipei Paralympic Committee had requested an explanation from the IPC. A representative of the CTPC stated that the People's Republic of China may have "interfered for political reasons" to prevent Chiang and Chen from participating in the Games. The Taipei Times article was subsequently reproduced on the Taiwanese government's website.

== Medalists ==
Chinese Taipei won two medals, a gold and a bronze.

Medal	Name	Sport	Event
Gold	Lin Tzu-hui	Powerlifting	Women's -75 kg
Bronze	Tseng Lung Hui	Archery	Men's Individual Recurve W1/W2

== Sports ==
=== Archery ===
Athlete	Event	Ranking round		Round of 32	Round of 16	Quarterfinals	Semifinals	Finals	
Athlete	Event	Score	Seed	Opposition score	Opposition score	Opposition score	Opposition score	Opposition score	Rank
Chen Wu Ying	Men's individual recurve W1/W2	552	26	Vitale (ITA); L 99–104	did not advance				
Tseng Lung Hui	Men's individual recurve W1/W2	625	6	Raksamai (THA); W 104–85	Yoshida (JPN); W 106–98	Lee H G (KOR); W 105–104	Vitale (ITA); L 101–103	Ozen (TUR); W *92-92	3rd place, bronze medalist(s)

* Tseng won 9 arrows to 6 arrows shot by Ozgur Ozen of Turkey in the bronze medal match.

=== Athletics ===
Athlete	Class	Event	Heats		Final	
Athlete	Class	Event	Result	Rank	Result	Rank
Chen Yu Lien	T54	100m	17.83	9	did not advance	
Chen Yu Lien	T54	200m	33.13	14	did not advance	

=== Powerlifting ===
Athlete	Event	Attempt 1	Attempt 2	Attempt 3	Rank
Huang Kuo-Tai	Men's +100kg	225.0	~~230.0~~	~~232.5~~	4
Lin Tzu-hui	Women's -75kg	137.5	~~142.5~~	~~142.5~~	1st place, gold medalist(s)
Lin Ya-Hsuan	Women's -56kg	75.0	77.5	82.5	6

=== Shooting ===
==== Men ====
Athlete	Event	Qualification		Final		
Athlete	Event	Score	Rank	Score	Total	Rank
Liu Wen-chang	Men's 10m air rifle standing SH1	566	24	did not advance		
Liu Wen-chang	Men's 50 metre rifle 3 positions SH1	1126	13	did not advance		
Liu Wen-chang	Mixed 10m air rifle prone SH1	592	38	did not advance		
Liu Wen-chang	Mixed 50m rifle prone SH1	569	38	did not advance		

==== Women ====
Athlete	Event	Qualification		Final		
Athlete	Event	Score	Rank	Score	Total	Rank
Lin Chin-mei	Women's 10m air pistol SH1	357	12	did not advance		

=== Swimming ===
Athlete	Class	Event	Heats		Final	
Athlete	Class	Event	Result	Rank	Result	Rank
Luo Alice Hsiao Hung	S6	50m freestyle	44.42	11	did not advance	
Luo Alice Hsiao Hung	S6	100m freestyle	1:33.64	11	did not advance	

=== Table tennis ===
==== Men ====
Athlete	Event	Preliminaries				Round of 16	Quarterfinals	Semifinals	Final / BM	
Athlete	Event	Opposition Result	Opposition Result	Opposition Result	Rank	Opposition Result	Opposition Result	Opposition Result	Opposition Result	Rank
Chang Chih Jung	Men's singles C4-5	Mihalik (SVK); L 1–3	Kim B Y (KOR); L 0–3	—N/a	3	did not advance				
Lin Wen Hsin	Men's singles C4-5	Bolldén (SWE); L 0–3	Ank (BRA); W 3–0	—N/a	2	did not advance				
Lin Yen Hung	Men's singles C4-5	Zhang Y (CHN); L 0–3	Chaiwut (THA); W 3–0	—N/a	2	did not advance				
Hou Ting Sung	Men's singles C8	Li M (CHN); L 1–3	Csejtey (SVK); L 0–3	Serignat (FRA); L 2–3	4	did not advance				
Hu Ming Fu	Men's singles C8	Grudzien (POL); W 3–1	Loicq (BEL); L 1–3	Pichon (FRA); L 2–3	3	did not advance				
Wu Cheng Sheng	Men's singles C3	Gurtler (GER); L 1–3	Kim J S (KOR); L 1–3	—N/a	3	did not advance				
Lin Wen Hsin; Lin Yen Hung	Men's team C4-5	—N/a				Brazil (BRA); W 3–1	China (CHN); L 0–3	did not advance		
Hou Ting Sung; Hu Ming Fu	Men's team C6-8	—N/a				Germany (GER); L 0–3	did not advance			

==== Women ====
Athlete	Event	Preliminaries				Round of 16	Quarterfinals	Semifinals	Final / BM	
Athlete	Event	Opposition Result	Opposition Result	Opposition Result	Rank	Opposition Result	Opposition Result	Opposition Result	Opposition Result	Rank
Tsai Hui Chu	Women's singles C5	Ren G (CHN); L 0–3	Lundback (SWE); L 0–3	Passos (BRA); W 3–0	3	did not advance				
Wei Mei Hui	Women's singles C5	Gu G (CHN); L 0–3	Paredes (MEX); W 3–0	Wong P Y (HKG); W 3–0	3	did not advance				
Tsai Hui Chu; Wei Mei Hui	Women's team C4-5	—N/a				Mexico (MEX); W 3–0	Jordan (JOR); L 2–3	did not advance		

== See also ==
- Chinese Taipei at the Paralympics
- Chinese Taipei at the 2008 Summer Olympics
