= Table tennis at the 2004 Summer Paralympics – Women's individual – Class 5 =

Table Tennis - Women's Singles 5 at the XII Paralympic Games
- Paralympic Table Tennis
- Venue: Galatsi Olympic Hall
- Dates: 18–21 September 2004
- Competitors: 11 from 8 nations

Medalists
1st place, gold medalist(s)		Ren Gui Xiang	China
2nd place, silver medalist(s)		Chen Wei Hong	China
3rd place, bronze medalist(s)		Wei Mei Hui	Chinese Taipei

The Women's Singles 5 table tennis competition at the 2004 Summer Paralympics was held from 18 to 21 September at the Galatsi Olympic Hall.

Classes 1-5 were for athletes with a physical impairment that affected their legs, who competed in a sitting position. The lower the number, the greater the impact the impairment was on an athlete’s ability to compete.

The event was won by Ren Gui Xiang, representing China.

== Results ==
=== Preliminaries ===
Qualified for final round

==== Group A ====
Rank	Competitor	MP	W	L	Points	CHN	TPE	JOR
1	Ren Gui Xiang (CHN)	2	2	0	6:0	x	3:0	3:0
2	Wei Mei Hui (TPE)	2	1	1	3:3	0:3	x	3:0
3	Khetam Abuawad (JOR)	2	0	2	0:6	0:3	0:3	x

==== Group B ====
Rank	Competitor	MP	W	L	Points	CHN	FRA	TPE	HKG
1	Chen Wei Hong (CHN)	3	3	0	9:2	x	3:0	3:1	3:1
2	Stephanie Palasse (FRA)	3	1	2	4:6	0:3	x	1:3	3:0
3	Hsiao Shu Chin (TPE)	3	1	2	6:7	1:3	3:1	x	2:3
4	Chan Siu Ling (HKG)	3	1	2	4:8	1:3	0:3	3:2	x

==== Group C ====
Rank	Competitor	MP	W	L	Points	CZE	MEX	JPN	CHN
1	Jitka Pivarciova (CZE)	3	3	0	9:2	x	3:0	3:1	3:1
2	Cristina Hoffmann (MEX)	3	2	1	6:7	0:3	x	3:2	3:2
3	Kimie Bessho (JPN)	3	1	2	6:7	1:3	2:3	x	3:1
4	Gu Gai (CHN)	3	0	3	4:9	1:3	2:3	1:3	x

=== Competition bracket ===
Quarterfinals
Stephanie Palasse (FRA)	1
Jitka Pivarciova (CZE)	3
Wei Mei Hui (TPE)	3
Cristina Hoffmann (MEX)	1

Semifinals
Ren Gui Xiang (CHN)	3
Jitka Pivarciova (CZE)	1
Wei Mei Hui (TPE)	2
Chen Wei Hong (CHN)	3

Finals
Ren Gui Xiang (CHN)	3
Chen Wei Hong (CHN)	0
Third place
Jitka Pivarciova (CZE)	2
Wei Mei Hui (TPE)	3
