= Table tennis at the 2008 Summer Paralympics – Women's individual – Class 5 =

2008 Women's Paralympic Table Tennis Competition

Women's Individual Class 5 at the XIII Paralympic Games
- Venue: Peking University Gymnasium
- Dates: 7 – 11 September 2008
- Competitors: 16 from 12 nations

Medalists
1st place, gold medalist(s)		Ren Guixiang	China
2nd place, silver medalist(s)		Gu Gai	China
3rd place, bronze medalist(s)		Andrea Zimmerer	Germany

The Women's Individual Class 5 table tennis competition at the 2008 Summer Paralympics was held between 7 September and 11 September at the Peking University Gymnasium.

Classes 1-5 were for athletes with a physical impairment that affected their legs, who competed in a sitting position. The lower the number, the greater the impact the impairment was on an athlete's ability to compete.

The event was won by Ren Guixiang, representing China.

== Results ==
=== Preliminary round ===
Qualified for the knock-out stages

==== Group A ====
Rank	Competitor	MP	W	L	Points	GER	CHN	HKG	POL
1	Andrea Zimmerer (GER)	3	3	0	9:1	x	3:1	3:0	3:0
2	Zhang Bian (CHN)	3	2	1	7:4	1:3	x	3:0	3:1
3	Chan Siu Ling (HKG)	3	1	2	3:6	0:3	0:3	x	3:0
4	Barbara Barszcz (POL)	3	0	3	1:9	0:3	1:3	0:3	x

7 September, 12:40

Zhang Bian (CHN)	11	11	11
Chan Siu Ling (HKG)	4	4	4
Andrea Zimmerer (GER)	11	11	11
Barbara Barszcz (POL)	2	1	4

8 September, 10:00

Zhang Bian (CHN)	11	7	11	11
Barbara Barszcz (POL)	4	11	1	2
Andrea Zimmerer (GER)	11	11	11	
Chan Siu Ling (HKG)	4	1	3	

9 September, 11:20

Chan Siu Ling (HKG)	11	11	11	
Barbara Barszcz (POL)	4	7	6	
Andrea Zimmerer (GER)	7	11	11	13
Zhang Bian (CHN)	11	9	5	11

==== Group B ====
Rank	Competitor	MP	W	L	Points	CHN	SWE	TPE	BRA
1	Ren Guixiang (CHN)	3	3	0	9:0	x	3:0	3:0	3:0
2	Ingela Lundback (SWE)	3	2	1	6:3	0:3	x	3:0	3:0
3	Tsai Hui Chu (TPE)	3	1	2	3:6	0:3	0:3	x	3:0
4	Maria Luiza Passos (BRA)	3	0	3	0:9	0:3	0:3	0:3	x

7 September, 12:40

Ingela Lundback (SWE)	11	13	11
Tsai Hui-chu (TPE)	8	11	5
Ren Guixiang (CHN)	11	11	11
Maria Luiza Passos (BRA)	4	2	3

8 September, 10:00

Ingela Lundback (SWE)	11	11	11
Maria Luiza Passos (BRA)	2	9	3
Ren Guixiang (CHN)	11	11	11
Tsai Hui-chu (TPE)	5	2	3

9 September, 11:20

Tsai Hui-chu (TPE)	11	11	11
Maria Luiza Passos (BRA)	6	6	2
Ren Guixiang (CHN)	11	11	11
Ingela Lundback (SWE)	4	5	6

==== Group C ====
Rank	Competitor	MP	W	L	Points	CHN	TPE	MEX	HKG
1	Gu Gai (CHN)	2	2	0	6:2	x	3:0	WBF	3:2
2	Wei Mei Hui (TPE)	3	2	1	6:3	0:3	x	3:0	3:0
3	Maria Paredes (MEX)	2	1	1	3:5	-	0:3	x	3:2
4	Wong Pui Yi (HKG)	3	0	3	4:9	2:3	0:3	2:3	x

7 September, 12:40

Wei Mei-hui (TPE)	11	11	11		
Maria Paredes (MEX)	6	8	9		
Gu Gai (CHN)	11	8	10	11	11
Wong Pui Yi (HKG)	3	11	12	5	4

8 September, 10:00

Wei Mei-hui (TPE)	11	11	11
Wong Pui Yi (HKG)	9	6	3
Gu Gai (CHN)	Won by forfeit		
Maria Paredes (MEX)			

9 September, 11:20

Maria Paredes (MEX)	13	8	4	11	11
Wong Pui Yi (HKG)	11	11	11	8	9
Gu Gai (CHN)	13	11	11		
Wei Mei-hui (TPE)	11	2	8		

==== Group D ====
Rank	Competitor	MP	W	L	Points	JOR	JPN	ITA	USA
1	Khetam Abuawad (JOR)	3	3	0	9:3	x	3:2	3:1	3:0
2	Kimie Bessho (JPN)	3	2	1	8:4	2:3	x	3:0	3:1
3	Maria Nardelli (ITA)	3	1	2	4:7	1:3	0:3	x	3:1
4	Noga Nir-Kistler (USA)	3	0	3	2:9	0:3	1:3	1:3	x

7 September, 12:40

Kimie Bessho (JPN)	10	11	11	11
Noga Nir-Kistler (USA)	12	8	9	6
Khetam Abuawad (JOR)	12	9	11	12
Maria Nardelli (ITA)	10	11	7	10

8 September, 10:00

Maria Nardelli (ITA)	11	11	10	11	
Noga Nir-Kistler (USA)	7	5	12	2	
Khetam Abuawad (JOR)	7	11	11	14	11
Kimie Bessho (JPN)	11	7	13	12	4

9 September, 11:20

Kimie Bessho (JPN)	12	11	11
Maria Nardelli (ITA)	10	7	5
Khetam Abuawad (JOR)	11	11	11
Noga Nir-Kistler (USA)	7	4	5

=== Competition bracket ===
Semifinals: 10 Sep 10:00
Andrea Zimmerer (GER)	4	11	6	7
Gu Gai (CHN)	11	8	11	11
Khetam Abuawad (JOR)	8	5	1
Ren Guixiang (CHN)	11	11	11

Gold medal match: 10 Sep 18:15
Gu Gai (CHN)	5	9	13
Ren Guixiang (CHN)	11	11	15
Bronze medal match: 10 Sep 18:15
Andrea Zimmerer (GER)	11	11	11
Khetam Abuawad (JOR)	4	2	3
