= Chinese Taipei at the 2024 Summer Paralympics =

- Chinese Taipei Paralympic flag
- IPC code: TPE
- NPC: Chinese Taipei Paralympic Committee

in Paris, France August 28, 2024 – September 8, 2024
- Competitors: 13 in 7 sports
- Flag bearers: Chen Po-yen; Liu Ya-ting
- Medals Ranked 68th: Gold 0 Silver 3 Bronze 2 Total 5

Summer Paralympics appearances (overview)
- 1992; 1996; 2000; 2004; 2008; 2012; 2016; 2020; 2024

Chinese Taipei competed at the 2024 Summer Paralympics in Paris, France, from 28 August to 8 September. "Chinese Taipei" is the designated name used by Taiwan to participate in some international organizations and almost all sporting events, including the Paralympic Games. Neither the common name "Taiwan" nor the official name "Republic of China" could be used primarily because of opposition from the People's Republic of China.

== Medalists ==
| Medal | Name | Sport | Event | Date |
|---|---|---|---|---|
| Silver | Lin Tzu-yu; Tien Shiau-wen | Table Tennis | Women's doubles WD20 | 31 August |
| Silver | Cheng Ming-chih | Table Tennis | Men's individual C5 | 3 September |
| Silver | Chen Po-yen | Table Tennis | Men's individual C11 | 5 September |
| Bronze | Xiao Xiang-wen | Taekwondo | Men's 58 kg | 29 August |
| Bronze | Tien Shiau-wen | Table Tennis | Women's individual C10 | 3 September |

== Competitors ==
The following is the list of number of competitors in the Games.

| Sport | Men | Women | Total |
|---|---|---|---|
| Archery | 1 | 0 | 1 |
| Athletics | 0 | 1 | 1 |
| Badminton | 1 | 3 | 4 |
| Judo | 1 | 0 | 1 |
| Powerlifting | 0 | 1 | 1 |
| Table tennis | 2 | 2 | 4 |
| Taekwondo | 1 | 0 | 1 |
| Total | 6 | 7 | 13 |

== Archery ==
For the first time since 2016, Chinese Taipei entered one male archers into the games by virtue of his result at the 2023 Asian Championships in Bangkok, Thailand.

| Athlete | Event | Ranking Round | | Round of 32 | Round of 16 | Quarterfinals | Semifinals | Finals | |
| Athlete | Event | Score | Seed | Opposition Score | Opposition Score | Opposition Score | Opposition Score | Opposition Score | Rank |
|---|---|---|---|---|---|---|---|---|---|
| Tseng Lung-hui | Men's individual recurve | 594 | 24 | Singh (IND); L 3–7 | Did not advance | | | | 17 |

== Athletics ==
One athlete from Chinese Taipei have qualified to compete at the Games.

| Athlete | Event | Final | |
| Athlete | Event | Result | Rank |
|---|---|---|---|
| Liu Ya-ting | Women's javelin throw F13 | 32.76 | 6 |

== Badminton ==
Chinese Taipei has qualified four para badminton players for the following events, through the release of BWF para-badminton Race to Paris Paralympic Ranking.

Singles

| Player | Event | Group stage | | | | Quarterfinals | Semi-finals | Final / BM | Rank |
| Player | Event | Opponent score | Opponent score | Opponent score | Rank | Opponent score | Opponent score | Opponent score | Rank |
|---|---|---|---|---|---|---|---|---|---|
| Fang Jen-yu | Men's SU5 | Anuar (MAS); L (14–21, 18–21) | Imai (JPN); L (21–15, 11–21, 19–21) | Anrimusthi (INA); L (14–21, 18–21) | 4 | Did not advance | | | 7 |
| Hu Guang-chiou | Women's WH1 | Chokyu (CAN); W (21–12, 21–12) | Pookkham (THA); L (8-21, 6-21) | Torres (BRA); W (21–17, 21–11) | 2 Q | Satomi (JPN); L (5-21, 11-21) | Did not advance | | 5 |
| Yang I-chen | Women's WH2 | Renggli (SUI); L (9-21, 18–21) | Li (CHN); L (4-21, 2–21) | Jáuregui (PER); L (10-21, 7–21) | 4 | Did not advance | | | 9 |
| Cai Yi-lin | Women's SH6 | Lin (CHN); L (7–21, 6–21) | Sivan (IND); L (12–21, 19–21) | Simon (USA); L (9–21, 8–21) | 4 | Did not advance | | | 10 |

Doubles

| Player | Event | Group stage | | | Semi-finals | Final / BM | Rank |
| Player | Event | Opponent score | Opponent score | Rank | Opponent score | Opponent score | Rank |
|---|---|---|---|---|---|---|---|
| Hu Guang-chiou; Yang I-chen | Women's WH1–2 | Mathez / Renggli (SUI); L (10–21, 19–21) | Pookkham / Wetwithan (THA); L (11–21, 8–21) | 3 | Did not advance | | 5 |

== Judo ==
| Athlete | Event | Seed | Preliminaries | Quarterfinals | Semifinals | Repechage | | Final / BM | |
| Athlete | Event | Seed | Opposition Result | Opposition Result | Opposition Result | Opposition Result | Opposition Result | Opposition Result | Rank |
|---|---|---|---|---|---|---|---|---|---|
| Chang Shao-hao | Men's –73 kg J2 | 11 | Bye | Seto (JPN); L 000–100 | Did not advance | Bye | Kim (KOR); L 000–100 | Did not advance | 7 |

== Powerlifting ==
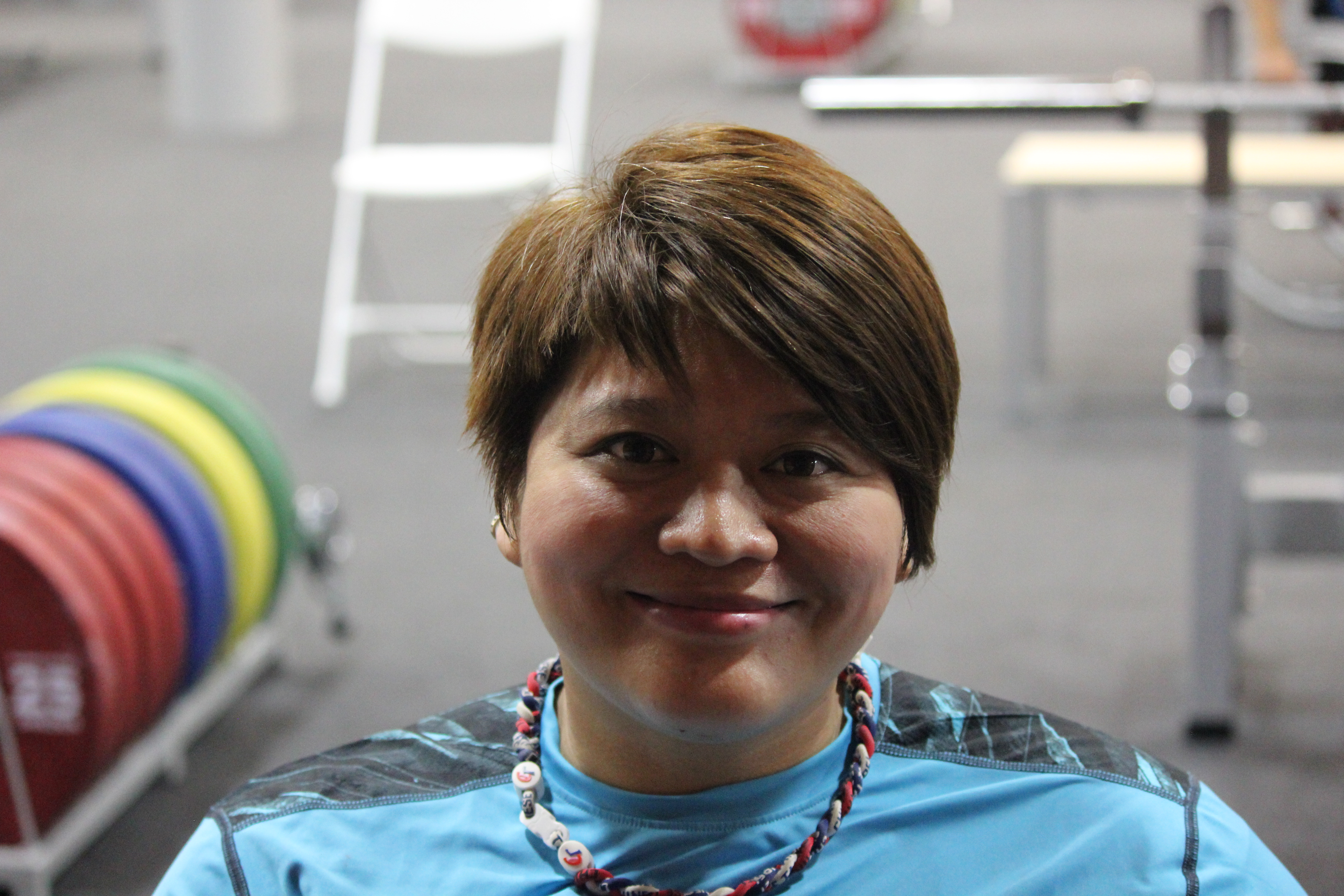
Lin Tzu Hui in Rio for the 2016 Summer Paralympics.

Six-time Paralympian and four-time Paralympic medalist, Lin Tzu-hui was entered into the competition by virtue of her world ranking.The best outcome out of three attempts counted as the final results. The athlete who placed first in each event was allowed a fourth attempt to break the Paralympic or world record.

| Athlete | Event | Attempts (kg) | | | | Result (kg) | Place |
| Athlete | Event | 1 | 2 | 3 | 4 | Result (kg) | Place |
|---|---|---|---|---|---|---|---|
| Lin Tzu-hui | Women's –86 kg | 95 | 105 | ~~113~~ | —N/a | 105 | 7 |

== Table tennis ==
Taiwan secure four single spot for the Paralympic games. Chen Po-yen take his spot after winning the 2023 Virtus Global Games held in Vichy, France. Meanwhile, Lin Tzu-yu, qualified for the games following the triumph of her gold medal at the 2022 Asian Para Games in Hangzhou, China. Later on, the other two athletes qualified for the games through the allocations of ITTF final world ranking.

| Athlete | Event | Seed | Round of 16 | Quarterfinals | Semifinals | Final | |
| Athlete | Event | Seed | Opposition Result | Opposition Result | Opposition Result | Opposition Result | Rank |
|---|---|---|---|---|---|---|---|
| Cheng Ming-chih | Men's individual C5 | 2 | Bye | Cao (CHN); W 3–1 | Palikuća (SRB); W 3–0 | Urhaug (NOR); L 2–3 | 2nd place, silver medalist(s) |
| Chen Po-yen | Men's individual C11 | 5 | Bye | van Acker (BEL); W 3–1 | Pálos (HUN); W 3–0 | Kim (KOR); L 1–3 | 2nd place, silver medalist(s) |
| Tien Shiau-wen | Women's individual C10 | 6 | Obazuaye (NGR); W 3–0 | Tapper (AUS); W 3–2 | Partyka (POL); L 2–3 | Did not advance | 3rd place, bronze medalist(s) |
| Lin Tzu-yu | Women's individual C10 | 7 | Bye | Yang (AUS); L 0–3 | Did not advance | | 5 |
| Lin Tzu-Yu; Tien Shiau-Wen | Women's doubles WD20 | 1 | Bye | Demir / Kavas (TUR); W 3–0 | Partyka / Pęk (POL); W 3–0 | Lei / Yang (AUS); L 1–3 | 2nd place, silver medalist(s) |

== Taekwondo ==
Chinese Taipei entered one athletes to compete at the Paralympics competition. Xiao Xiang-wen qualified for Paris 2024, by virtue of finishing within the top six in the Paralympic rankings in class 58 kg, marking the nations debut in the para sport.

| Athlete | Event | First round | Quarterfinals | Semifinals | Repechage 1 | Repechage 2 | Final / BM | |
| Athlete | Event | Opposition Result | Opposition Result | Opposition Result | Opposition Result | Opposition Result | Opposition Result | Rank |
|---|---|---|---|---|---|---|---|---|
| Xiao Xiang-wen | Men's –58 kg | Danishi (AFG); W 37–7 | Kong (FRA); W 22–1 | Yasur (ISR); L 6–16 | —N/a | | Villalobos (ESP); W 16–8 | 3rd place, bronze medalist(s) |

== See also ==
- Chinese Taipei at the 2024 Summer Olympics
- Chinese Taipei at the Paralympics
