= Table tennis at the 2004 Summer Paralympics – Women's team – Class 4–5 =

Table Tennis - Women's Teams 4-5 at the XII Paralympic Games
- Paralympic Table Tennis
- Venue: Galatsi Olympic Hall
- Dates: 23–27 September 2004
- Competitors: 9

Medalists
1st place, gold medalist(s)		Gu Gai; Ren Gui Xiang; Chen Wei Hong	China
2nd place, silver medalist(s)		Wei Mei Hui; Hsiao Shu Chin	Chinese Taipei
3rd place, bronze medalist(s)		Khetam Abuawad; Maha Al Bargouti; Fatemah Al Azzam	Jordan

The Women's Teams 4-5 table tennis competition at the 2004 Summer Paralympics was held from 23 to 27 September at the Galatsi Olympic Hall.

Classes 1-5 were for athletes with a physical impairment that affected their legs, who competed in a sitting position. The lower the number, the greater the impact the impairment was on an athlete’s ability to compete.

The event was won by the team representing China.

== Results ==
=== Preliminaries ===
Qualified for final round

Rank	Competitor	MP	W	L	Points	CHN	FRA	SLO
1	China	2	2	0	6:0	x	3:0	3:0
2	France	2	1	1	3:4	0:3	x	3:1
3	Slovenia	2	0	2	1:6	0:3	1:3	x

==== Group B ====
Rank	Competitor	MP	W	L	Points	TPE	JOR	GER
1	Chinese Taipei	2	2	0	6:0	x	3:0	3:0
2	Jordan	2	1	1	3:5	0:3	x	3:2
3	Germany	2	0	2	2:6	0:3	2:3	x

==== Group C ====
Rank	Competitor	MP	W	L	Points	SVK	MEX	ITA
1	Slovakia	2	2	0	6:2	x	3:1	3:1
2	Mexico	2	1	1	4:3	1:3	x	3:0
3	Italy	2	0	2	1:6	1:3	0:3	x

=== Competition bracket ===
Quarterfinals
Jordan	3
Slovakia	2
Mexico	1
France	3

Semifinals
China	3
Jordan	0
France	0
Chinese Taipei	3

Finals
China	3
Chinese Taipei	0
Third place
Jordan	3
France	1

== Team Lists ==
China; Gu Gai; Ren Gui Xiang; Chen Wei Hong	France; Stephanie Palasse; Valerie Gay	Slovenia; Mateja Pintar; Andreja Dolinar	Chinese Taipei; Wei Mei Hui; Hsiao Shu Chin
Jordan; Khetam Abuawad; Maha Al Bargouti; Fatemah Al Azzam	Germany; Monika Sikora Weinmann; Christiane Pape; Monika Bartheidel	Slovakia; Alena Kanova; Maria Pillarova	Mexico; Isabel Garcia Ble; Cristina Hoffmann; Marie Teresa Arenales
Italy; Clara Podda; Valeria Zorzetto	South Africa; Aletta Moll; Rosabelle Riese		
