= China at the 2000 Summer Paralympics =

- IPC code: CHN
- NPC: China Administration of Sports for Persons with Disabilities
- Website: www.caspd.org.cn

in Sydney
- Competitors: 87 in 6 sports
- Medals Ranked 6th: Gold 34 Silver 22 Bronze 17 Total 73

Summer Paralympics appearances (overview)
- 1984; 1988; 1992; 1996; 2000; 2004; 2008; 2012; 2016; 2020; 2024

China competed at the 2000 Summer Paralympics, held in Sydney, Australia.

== Medal table ==
Medal	Name	Sport	Event
Gold	Li Qiang	Athletics	Men's 100m T12
Gold	Li Qiang	Athletics	Men's 400m T12
Gold	Bin Hou	Athletics	Men's high jump F42
Gold	Yancong Wu	Athletics	Men's high jump F46
Gold	Hongwei Zhang	Athletics	Men's long jump F46
Gold	Hai Tao Sun	Athletics	Men's shot put F13
Gold	Wentao Huang	Athletics	Men's triple jump F12
Gold	Hongwei Zhang	Athletics	Men's triple jump F46
Gold	Hong Yan Xu	Athletics	Women's discus F12
Gold	Hong Ping Wu	Athletics	Women's discus F46
Gold	Juan Yao	Athletics	Women's javelin F44
Gold	Hai Dong Zhang	Powerlifting	Men's -75kg
Gold	Jian Xin Bian	Powerlifting	Women's -40kg
Gold	Taoying Fu	Powerlifting	Women's -56kg
Gold	Rui Fang Li	Powerlifting	Women's -75kg
Gold	Ping Cao	Powerlifting	Women's +82.5kg
Gold	Wei Huang	Shooting	Mixed sport pistol SH1
Gold	Junquan He	Swimming	Men's 50m butterfly S5
Gold	Jianhua Yin	Swimming	Men's 50m freestyle S6
Gold	Xiao Ming Xiong	Swimming	Men's 50m freestyle S9
Gold	Jianhua Yin	Swimming	Men's 100m freestyle S6
Gold	Xiao Ming Xiong	Swimming	Men's 100m freestyle S9
Gold	Hengheng Tian	Swimming	Men's 200m individual medley SM8
Gold	Hong Yan Zhu	Swimming	Women's 50m freestyle S12
Gold	Qiming Dong	Swimming	Women's 100m backstroke S11
Gold	Hong Yan Zhu	Swimming	Women's 100m backstroke S12
Gold	Hong Yan Zhu	Swimming	Women's 100m butterfly S12
Gold	Hong Yan Zhu	Swimming	Women's 100m freestyle S12
Gold	Qiming Dong	Swimming	Women's 200m individual medley SM11
Gold	Hong Yan Zhu	Swimming	Women's 200m individual medley SM12
Gold	Wei Hong Chen	Table tennis	Women's singles 5
Gold	Xiaoling Zhang	Table tennis	Women's singles 6-8
Gold	Wei Hong Chen; Gui Xiang Ren	Table tennis	Women's teams 4-5
Gold	Xiaoling Zhang; Fuqun Luo; Chunmin Lu; Mei Li Liu	Table tennis	Women's teams 6-10
Silver	Haichen Liang	Athletics	Men's 100m T46
Silver	Li Qiang	Athletics	Men's 200m T12
Silver	Hai Tao Sun	Athletics	Men's discus F13
Silver	Wei Zhong Guo	Athletics	Men's high jump F42
Silver	Si Lao Ha	Athletics	Men's javelin F44
Silver	Dai Chen Wang	Athletics	Men's javelin F46
Silver	Li Duan	Athletics	Men's triple jump F11
Silver	Hong Ping Wu	Athletics	Women's javelin F46
Silver	Hong Yan Xu	Athletics	Women's shot put F12
Silver	Hong Ping Wu	Athletics	Women's shot put F46
Silver	Baoji Cui	Judo	Men's -73kg
Silver	Yu Zuo	Powerlifting	Women's -60kg
Silver	Mingxia Zhu	Powerlifting	Women's -67.5kg
Silver	Jian Fei Li	Shooting	Men's air pistol SH1
Silver	Hai Yan Lin	Shooting	Women's air pistol SH1
Silver	Junquan He	Swimming	Men's 50m backstroke S5
Silver	Henghend Tian	Swimming	Men's 50m freestyle S8
Silver	Baoren Gong	Swimming	Men's 100m breaststroke SB7
Silver	Wei Zhao	Swimming	Men's 100m breaststroke SB8
Silver	Zhiqiang Zhang	Swimming	Men's 400m freestyle S6
Silver	Gui Xiang Ren	Swimming	Women's singles 5
Silver	Mei Li Liu	Table tennis	Women's singles 9
Bronze	Yanjian Wu	Athletics	Men's 1500m T46
Bronze	Yanjian Wu	Athletics	Men's 5000m T46
Bronze	Hai Tao Sun	Athletics	Men's javelin F13
Bronze	Li Duan	Athletics	Men's long jump F11
Bronze	Juan Wang	Athletics	Women's 100m T44
Bronze	Juan Wang	Athletics	Women's 200m T44
Bronze	Haiying Xiao	Athletics	Women's long jump F46
Bronze	Run Ming Men	Judo	Men's -100kg
Bronze	Jian Wang	Powerlifting	Men's -52kg
Bronze	Ya Dong Wu	Powerlifting	Men's -90kg
Bronze	Xia Zhang	Powerlifting	Women's -48kg
Bronze	Hua Bin Zeng	Swimming	Men's 50m backstroke S4
Bronze	Kai Xia	Swimming	Men's 50m butterfly S6
Bronze	Jianhua Yin	Swimming	Men's 100m backstroke S6
Bronze	Jianhua Yin	Swimming	Men's 400m freestyle S6
Bronze	Kai Xia; Qiwen Mao; Peng Li; Hua Bin Zeng; Junquan He	Swimming	Men's 4x50m medley relay 20 pts
Bronze	Fuqun Luo	Table tennis	Women's singles 9

== See also ==
- China at the Paralympics
- China at the 2000 Summer Olympics
- Sports in China
