= Ren Guixiang =

Chinese para table tennis player

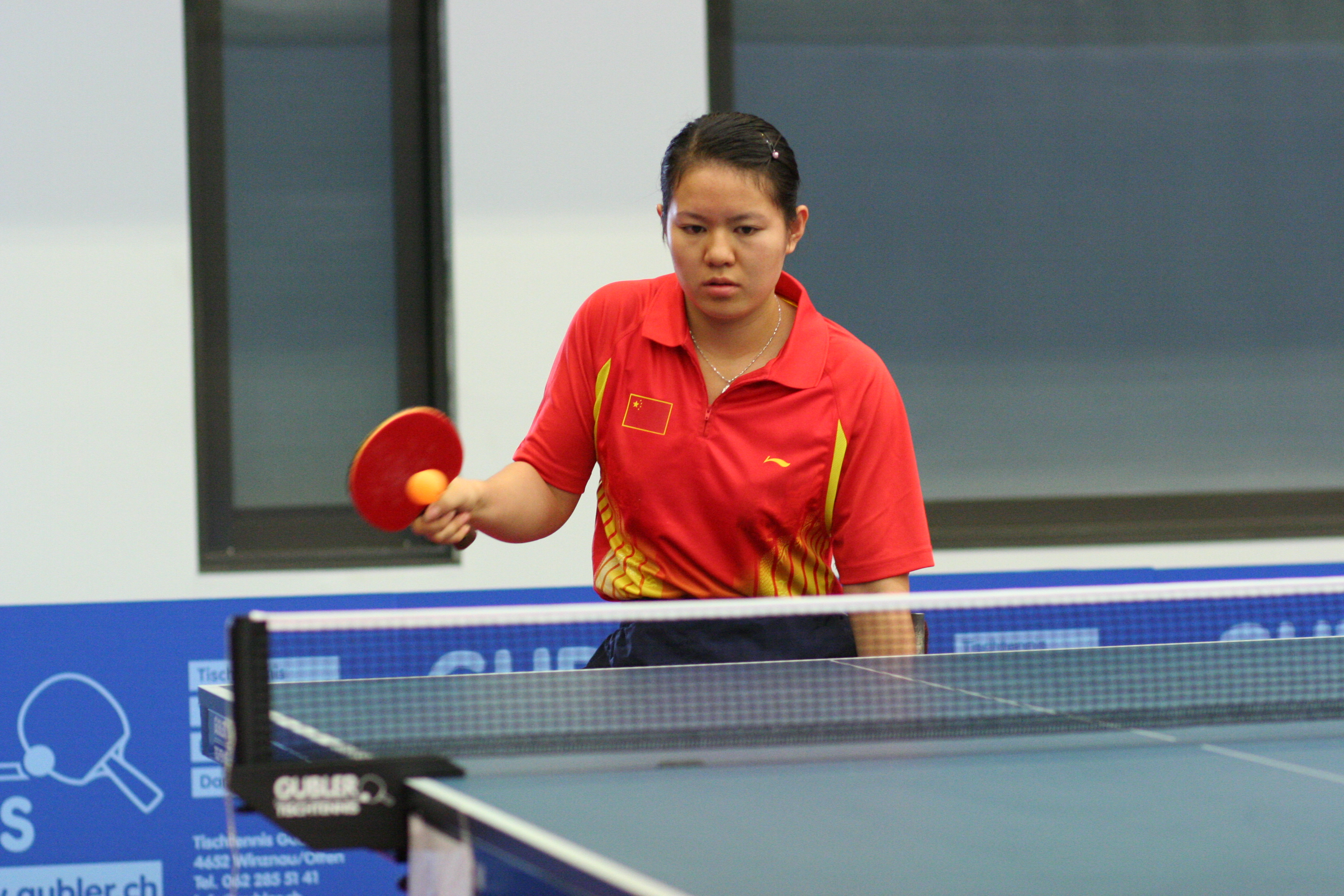
- Ren at the 2006 World Championships

Personal information
- Born: July 8, 1981 (age 45) Xiao County, Anhui, China

Sport
- Sport: Table tennis
- Playing style: Right-handed shakehand grip
- Disability class: 5
- Highest ranking: 1 (December 2001)
Medal record
Women's para table tennis
Representing China
Paralympic Games
Gold medal – first place	2000 Sydney	Teams C4–5
Gold medal – first place	2004 Athens	Singles C5
Gold medal – first place	2004 Athens	Teams C4–5
Gold medal – first place	2008 Beijing	Singles C5
Gold medal – first place	2008 Beijing	Teams C4–5
Silver medal – second place	2000 Sydney	Singles C5
World Championships
Gold medal – first place	2002 Taipei	Singles C5
Gold medal – first place	2002 Taipei	Open singles in wheelchair
Gold medal – first place	2002 Taipei	Teams C5
Gold medal – first place	2006 Montreux	Singles C5
Gold medal – first place	2006 Montreux	Open singles standing
Gold medal – first place	2006 Montreux	Teams C5
Asian Para Games
Gold medal – first place	2010 Guangzhou	Teams C4–5
Silver medal – second place	2010 Guangzhou	Singles C5
FESPIC Games
Gold medal – first place	1999 Bangkok	Open singles in wheelchair
Gold medal – first place	2002 Busan	Singles C5
Gold medal – first place	2002 Busan	Open singles in wheelchair
Gold medal – first place	2002 Busan	Teams C5
Gold medal – first place	2006 Kuala Lumpur	Singles C5
Gold medal – first place	2006 Kuala Lumpur	Open singles standing
Gold medal – first place	2006 Kuala Lumpur	Teams C5
Silver medal – second place	1999 Bangkok	Singles C5
Asian Championships
Gold medal – first place	2007 Seoul	Singles C5
Gold medal – first place	2007 Seoul	Teams C4–5
Gold medal – first place	2009 Amman	Singles C5
Gold medal – first place	2009 Amman	Open singles in wheelchair
Gold medal – first place	2009 Amman	Teams C4–5
Silver medal – second place	2007 Seoul	Open singles in wheelchair
FESPIC Championships
Gold medal – first place	1999 Taipei	Open singles in wheelchair
Gold medal – first place	1999 Taipei	Doubles C1–5
Gold medal – first place	2001 Osaka	Open Singles C5
Gold medal – first place	2001 Osaka	Open singles in wheelchair
Gold medal – first place	2001 Osaka	Teams C5
Gold medal – first place	2003 Shanghai	Open singles in wheelchair
Silver medal – second place	2003 Shanghai	Singles C4–5

Ren Guixiang (Chinese: 任桂香; pinyin: Rén Guìxiāng, born 8 July 1981) is a Chinese retired para table tennis player. She has won five gold medals and one silver from three Paralympic Games (2000, 2004, and 2008).

She is a polio survivor.

== Personal life ==
Ren is married to her national teammate Zhang Yan. They have a daughter together.
