= Chen Weihong =

Chinese para table tennis player

Personal information
- Born: 29 March 1970 (age 56) Zhuzhou, Hunan, China

Sport
- Sport: Table tennis
- Playing style: Right-handed penhold
- Disability class: 5 (formerly 8)
- Highest ranking: 2 (September 2001)
Medal record
Women's para table tennis
Representing China
Paralympic Games
Gold medal – first place	2000 Sydney	Singles C5
Gold medal – first place	2000 Sydney	Teams C4–5
Gold medal – first place	2004 Athens	Teams C4–5
Silver medal – second place	2004 Athens	Singles C5
World Championships
Gold medal – first place	2002 Taipei	Teams C5
Silver medal – second place	2002 Taipei	Singles C5
Silver medal – second place	2002 Taipei	Open singles in wheelchair
FESPIC Games
Gold medal – first place	1999 Bangkok	Teams C6–10
Gold medal – first place	2002 Busan	Teams C5
Silver medal – second place	2002 Busan	Open singles in wheelchair
Bronze medal – third place	1999 Bangkok	Singles C8
FESPIC Championships
Gold medal – first place	2001 Osaka	Teams C5
Silver medal – second place	2001 Osaka	Singles C5
Silver medal – second place	2001 Osaka	Open singles in wheelchair
Silver medal – second place	2003 Shanghai	Open singles in wheelchair
Bronze medal – third place	1997 Hong Kong	Singles C8–9

Chen Weihong
- Traditional Chinese: 陳偉紅
- Simplified Chinese: 陈伟红
Transcriptions
Standard Mandarin
- Hanyu Pinyin: Chén Wěihóng

Chen Weihong (Chinese: 陈伟红, born 29 March 1970) is a Chinese retired para table tennis player. She won three gold medals and a silver from the 2000 and 2004 Summer Paralympics.

She is a polio survivor.
