= Table tennis at the 2004 Summer Paralympics – Men's team – Class 9 =

Table Tennis - Men's Teams 9 at the XII Paralympic Games
- Paralympic Table Tennis
- Venue: Galatsi Olympic Hall
- Dates: 23–27 September 2004
- Competitors: 7

Medalists
1st place, gold medalist(s)		Gerben Last; Tonnie Heijnen	Netherlands
2nd place, silver medalist(s)		Stanislaw Fraczyk; Rene Gutdeutsch	Austria
3rd place, bronze medalist(s)		Hsu Chih Shan; Hu Ming Fu	Chinese Taipei

The Men's Teams 9 table tennis competition at the 2004 Summer Paralympics was held from 23 to 27 September at the Galatsi Olympic Hall.

Classes 6–10 were for athletes with a physical impairment who competed from a standing position; the lower the number, the greater the impact the impairment had on an athlete’s ability to compete.

The event was won by the team representing Netherlands.

== Results ==
=== Preliminaries ===
Qualified for final round

==== Group A ====
Rank	Competitor	MP	W	L	Points	AUT	USA	JPN
1	Austria	2	2	0	6:1	x	3:1	3:0
2	United States	2	1	1	4:5	1:3	x	3:2
3	Japan	2	0	2	2:6	0:3	2:3	x

==== Group B ====
Rank	Competitor	MP	W	L	Points	NED	TPE	CRO	IRI
1	Netherlands	3	3	0	9:4	x	3:1	3:2	3:1
2	Chinese Taipei	3	2	1	7:3	1:3	x	3:0	3:0
3	Croatia	3	1	2	5:7	2:3	0:3	x	3:1
4	Iran	3	0	3	2:9	1:3	0:3	1:3	x

=== Competition bracket ===
Semi-finals
Austria	3
Chinese Taipei	1
United States	1
Netherlands	3

Final
Austria	2
Netherlands	3
Third place
United States	2
Chinese Taipei	3

== Team Lists ==
Austria; Stanislaw Fraczyk; Rene Gutdeutsch	United States; Tahl Leibovitz; Wayne Lo	Japan; Shigekazu Tomioka; Hatsuo Ono	Netherlands; Gerben Last; Tonnie Heijnen
Chinese Taipei; Hsu Chih Shan; Hu Ming Fu	Croatia; Emil Gubica; Ratko Kovacic; Dragan Rakic	Iran; Behnam Rahbari; Abbas Alimardani	
