= Chinese Taipei at the 1996 Summer Paralympics =

- Chinese Taipei Paralympic flag
- IPC code: TPE
- NPC: Chinese Taipei Paralympic Committee

in Atlanta
- Competitors: 14 (13 men and 1 woman)
- Medals Ranked 49th: Gold 1 Silver 0 Bronze 2 Total 3

Summer Paralympics appearances (overview)
- 1992; 1996; 2000; 2004; 2008; 2012; 2016; 2020; 2024

Fourteen athletes (thirteen men and one woman) from Chinese Taipei competed at the 1996 Summer Paralympics in Atlanta, United States.

== Medallists ==
Medal	Name	Sport	Event
Gold	Lee Ching-chung	Judo	Men's 60kg
Bronze	Hsu Chih-shan	Table tennis	Men's open 6-10
Bronze	Chou Chang-shen	Table tennis	Men's singles 5

== See also ==
- Chinese Taipei at the Paralympics
- Chinese Taipei at the 1996 Summer Olympics
