= Hu Mingfu =

Taiwanese para table tennis player

Personal information
- Born: 6 May 1962 (age 64) Taiwan

Sport
- Sport: Table tennis
- Playing style: Right-handed penhold
- Disability class: 8
- Highest ranking: 1 (March 1998)
- Current ranking: 29 (February 2020)
Medal record
Men's para table tennis
Representing Chinese Taipei
Paralympic Games
Bronze medal – third place	2000 Sydney	Teams C9
Bronze medal – third place	2004 Athens	Teams C9
World Championships
Silver medal – second place	2002 Taipei	Singles C8
Silver medal – second place	2002 Taipei	Teams C8
Bronze medal – third place	1998 Paris	Singles C8
Bronze medal – third place	1998 Paris	Teams C8
Asian Para Games
Bronze medal – third place	2010 Guangzhou	Teams C6–8
Bronze medal – third place	2014 Incheon	Teams C8
Bronze medal – third place	2018 Jakarta	Teams C8
FESPIC Games
Gold medal – first place	2002 Busan	Singles C7–8
Silver medal – second place	1999 Bangkok	Singles C8
Silver medal – second place	1999 Bangkok	Teams C8
Silver medal – second place	2006 Kuala Lumpur	Teams C8
Bronze medal – third place	1999 Bangkok	Open singles standing
Bronze medal – third place	2002 Busan	Teams C8
Asian Championships
Gold medal – first place	2005 Kuala Lumpur	Teams C8
Silver medal – second place	2007 Seoul	Singles C8
Silver medal – second place	2013 Beijing	Teams C8
Silver medal – second place	2015 Amman	Teams C8
Silver medal – second place	2017 Beijing	Teams C8
Bronze medal – third place	2009 Amman	Singles C8
Bronze medal – third place	2019 Taichung	Teams C8
FESPIC Championships
Gold medal – first place	1997 Hong Kong	Singles C8
Gold medal – first place	2003 Shanghai	Singles C8
Silver medal – second place	1997 Hong Kong	Open singles standing
Silver medal – second place	1999 Taipei	Teams C6–8
Silver medal – second place	2001 Osaka	Teams C7–8
Bronze medal – third place	1999 Taipei	Singles C8
Bronze medal – third place	2001 Osaka	Open singles standing

Hu Mingfu
- Traditional Chinese: 胡銘福
- Simplified Chinese: 胡铭福
Transcriptions
Standard Mandarin
- Hanyu Pinyin: Hú Míngfú

Hu Mingfu (Chinese: 胡銘福, born 6 May 1962) is a Taiwanese para table tennis player. He was a bronze medalist at the 2000 and 2004 Summer Paralympics.

He is a member of the Bunun ethnic group.
