= Chinese Taipei at the 1992 Summer Paralympics =

- Chinese Taipei Paralympic flag
- IPC code: TPE
- NPC: Chinese Taipei Paralympic Committee

in Barcelona
- Competitors: 11
- Medals Ranked 55th: Gold 0 Silver 0 Bronze 1 Total 1

Summer Paralympics appearances (overview)
- 1992; 1996; 2000; 2004; 2008; 2012; 2016; 2020; 2024

Chinese Taipei competed at the 1992 Summer Paralympics in Barcelona, Spain. 11 competitors from Chinese Taipei won a single bronze medal and finished joint 50th in the medal table along with five other countries.

== Medalists ==
Medal	Name	Sport	Event
Bronze	Lin Der-chang	Judo	Men's 86 kg

== See also ==
- Chinese Taipei at the Paralympics
- Chinese Taipei at the 1992 Summer Olympics
