= Wong Pui Yi =

Hong Kong para table tennis player

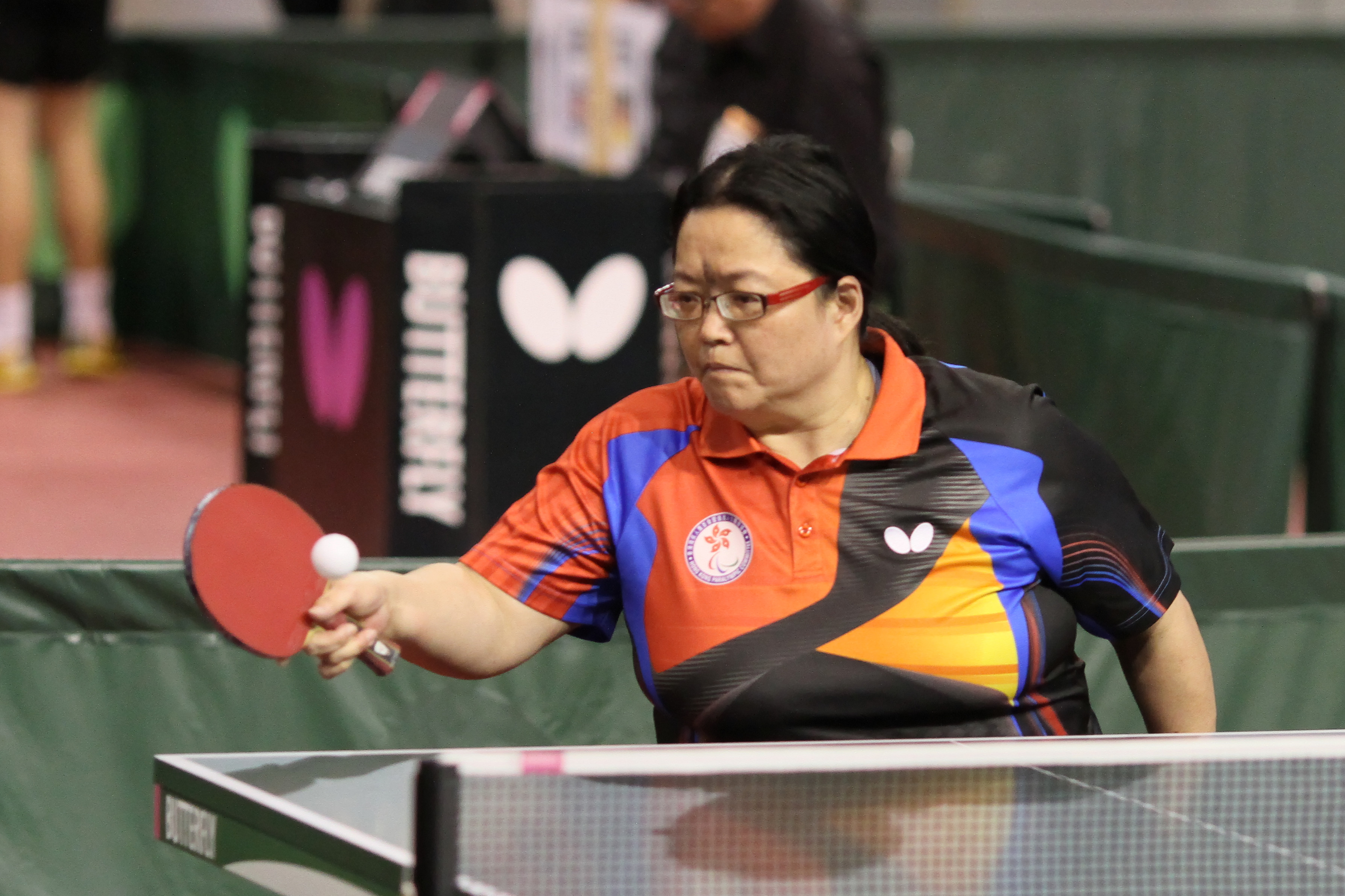
- Wong in 2017

Personal information
- Born: May 31, 1961 (age 65) Hong Kong
- Height: 155 cm (5 ft 1 in)
- Weight: 70 kg (154 lb)

Sport
- Sport: Table tennis
- Playing style: Right-handed shakehand hold
- Disability class: 5
- Highest ranking: 1 (March 1998)
- Current ranking: 13 (February 2020)
Medal record
Women's para table tennis
Representing Hong Kong
Summer Paralympics
Gold medal – first place	1992 Barcelona	Teams C5
Silver medal – second place	1996 Atlanta	Open singles in wheelchair
Silver medal – second place	1996 Atlanta	Teams C3–5
World Championships
Gold medal – first place	1998 Paris	Open singles in wheelchair
Silver medal – second place	1998 Paris	Teams C4–5
Bronze medal – third place	2002 Taipei	Teams C5
Asian Para Games
Bronze medal – third place	2018 Jakarta	Singles C5
FESPIC Games
Gold medal – first place	1999 Bangkok	Teams C3–5
Silver medal – second place	1999 Bangkok	Open singles in wheelchair
Bronze medal – third place	1999 Bangkok	Singles C5
Bronze medal – third place	2002 Busan	Teams C5
Asia/South Pacific Championships
Bronze medal – third place	2005 Kuala Lumpur	Teams C5
FESPIC Championships
Gold medal – first place	1997 Hong Kong	Singles C5
Gold medal – first place	1997 Hong Kong	Open singles in wheelchair
Silver medal – second place	1999 Taipei	Teams C5
Silver medal – second place	1999 Taipei	Doubles C1–5
Bronze medal – third place	2001 Osaka	Teams C5

Wong Pui Yi
- Traditional Chinese: 黃佩儀
- Simplified Chinese: 黄佩仪
Transcriptions
Standard Mandarin
- Hanyu Pinyin: Huáng Pèiyí
Yue: Cantonese
- Jyutping: Wong^{4} Pui^{3} Ji^{4}

Wong Pui Yi (Chinese: 黃佩儀, born 31 May 1961) is a Hong Kong para table tennis player. She won a gold medal at the 1992 Summer Paralympics and two silver medals at the 1996 Summer Paralympics.

She was diagnosed with polio when she was one year old. She began playing in 1979.
