= Andrea Zimmerer =

German para table tennis player

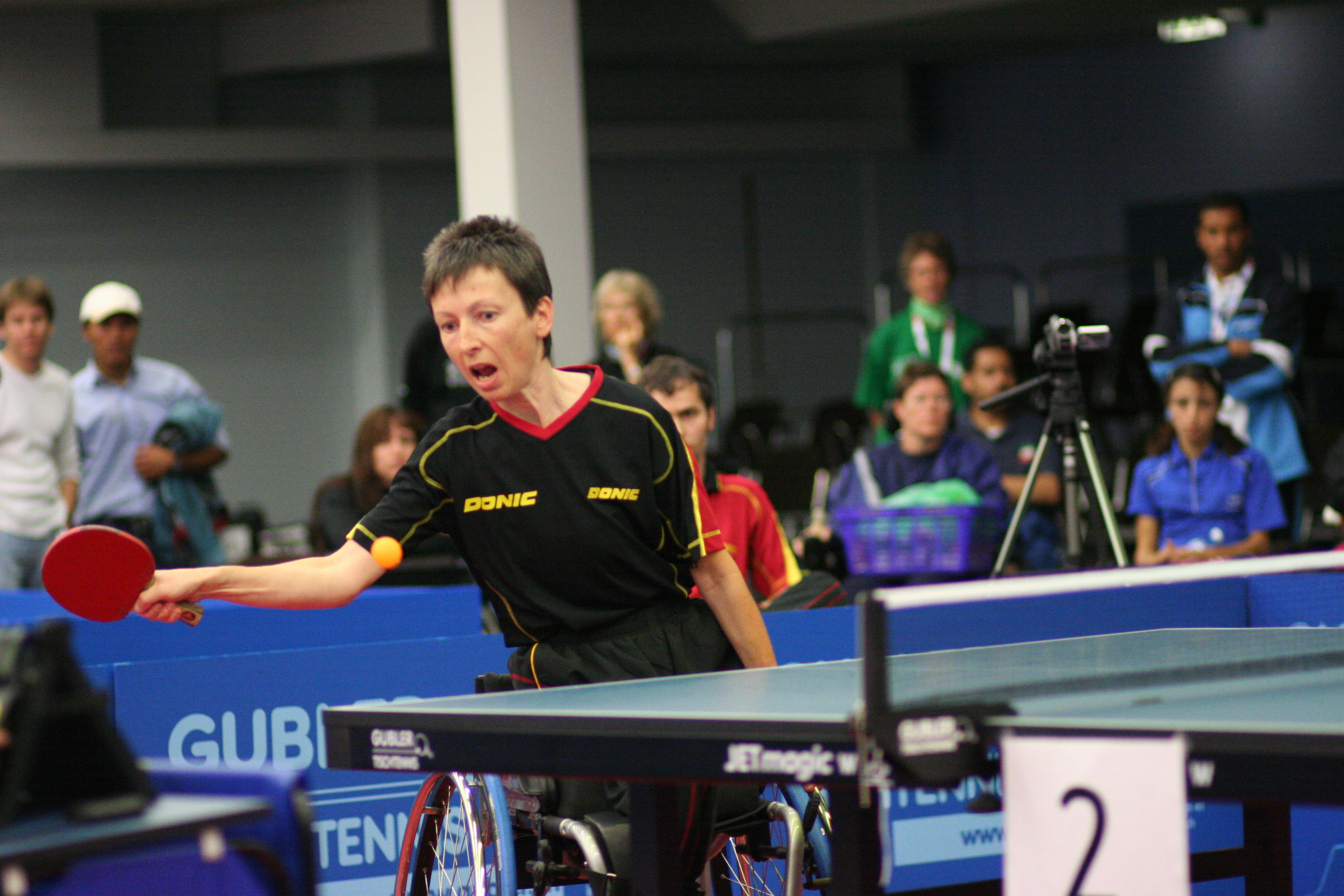
- Zimmerer at 2006 World Championships

Personal information
- Born: 4 June 1965 (age 61) Preetz, West Germany

Sport
- Country: Germany
- Sport: Para table tennis
- Disability class: C5
Medal record
Para table tennis
Representing Germany
Paralympic Games
Silver medal – second place	2008 Beijing	Teams C4-5
Bronze medal – third place	2008 Beijing	Singles C5
World Championships
Silver medal – second place	2006 Montreux	Teams C5
Bronze medal – third place	2006 Montreux	Open singles
European Championships
Gold medal – first place	2005 Jesolo	Teams C5
Gold medal – first place	2007 Kranjska Gora	Singles C5
Gold medal – first place	2007 Kranjska Gora	Teams C5
Silver medal – second place	2005 Jesolo	Singles C5
Silver medal – second place	2007 Kranjska Gora	Open singles

Andrea Zimmerer (born 4 June 1965) is a German retired para table tennis player who competed in international elite competitions. She is a double Paralympic medalist, double World medalist and a triple European champion.
