= Liu Ya-ting =

Personal information
- Born: 2 August 1991 (age 34) Taiwan

Sport
- Sport: Paralympic athletics
Medal record
Representing Chinese Taipei
World Championships
Bronze medal – third place	2013 Lyon	Javelin throw F13
Asian Para Games
Silver medal – second place	2018 Jakarta	Javelin throw F12/13
Bronze medal – third place	2010 Guangzhou	100m T13
Bronze medal – third place	2022 Hangzhou	Javelin throw F13

Liu Ya-ting (born 2 August 1991) is a Taiwanese Paralympic athlete who competes in international track and field competitions. She is a World bronze medalist and a multi-medalist at the Asian Para Games. She has also competed at the four Paralympic Games.

In 2014, Liu broke the Asian record in javelin throw F13 at the IPC Athletics Grand Prix in Beijing that stood for 15 years.
