= 1977 FESPIC Games =

2nd FESPIC Games
- Host city: Parramatta, Australia
- Nations: 15
- Athletes: 310
- Opening: November 20, 1977
- Closing: November 26, 1977
- Opened by: Malcolm Fraser

The 2nd FESPIC Games was a multi-sport event for Far East and South Pacific athletes with a disability held in Parramatta, Australia.

The Games were opened on November 20, 1977, by Right Honourable Malcolm Fraser, Prime Minister of Australia and closed on November 26, 1977, by Honourable Neville Wran, Premier of New South Wales.

== Participation ==
Fifteen countries participated - Australia, New Zealand, Indonesia, Hong Kong, Japan, Burma, India, Fiji, Singapore, Nepal, Papua New Guinea, Tonga, Philippines, Korea and Malaysia.

There were 310 athletes - 42 who were blind or visually impaired, 82 who were amputees and 185 who were wheelchair users.

== Administration ==
The FESPIC Executive granted Sydney the right to host the 2nd FESPIC Games during its meeting held during the 1976 Toronto Paralympic Games. The Organising Committee only had just over a year to organise the second international disability sporting event in Australia. The first event was the 1962 Commonwealth Paraplegic Games held in Perth, Western Australia. Dr John Grant, the President of the Australian Wheelchair Sports Federation, was the chairman of the Organising Committee. Funding for the Games was provided by the Australian Government, New South Government, City of Parramatta, City of Holroyd, Baulkham Hills Shire, Merrylands Council, Red Cross and several sporting organisations.

== Facilities ==
The Games Village was the William Thompson Masonic School in Baulkham Hills which had closed down in 1972. There was an enormous amount of work devoted to making the old school habitable for athletes and their escorts.

== Sports ==
Thirteen sports were held during the Games - archery, athletics, dartchery, lawn bowls, FITA round bowls, powerlifting, shooting, slalom, snooker, swimming, table tennis, wheelchair basketball and wheelchair fencing.
