= Hsu Chih-shan =

Taiwanese para table tennis player

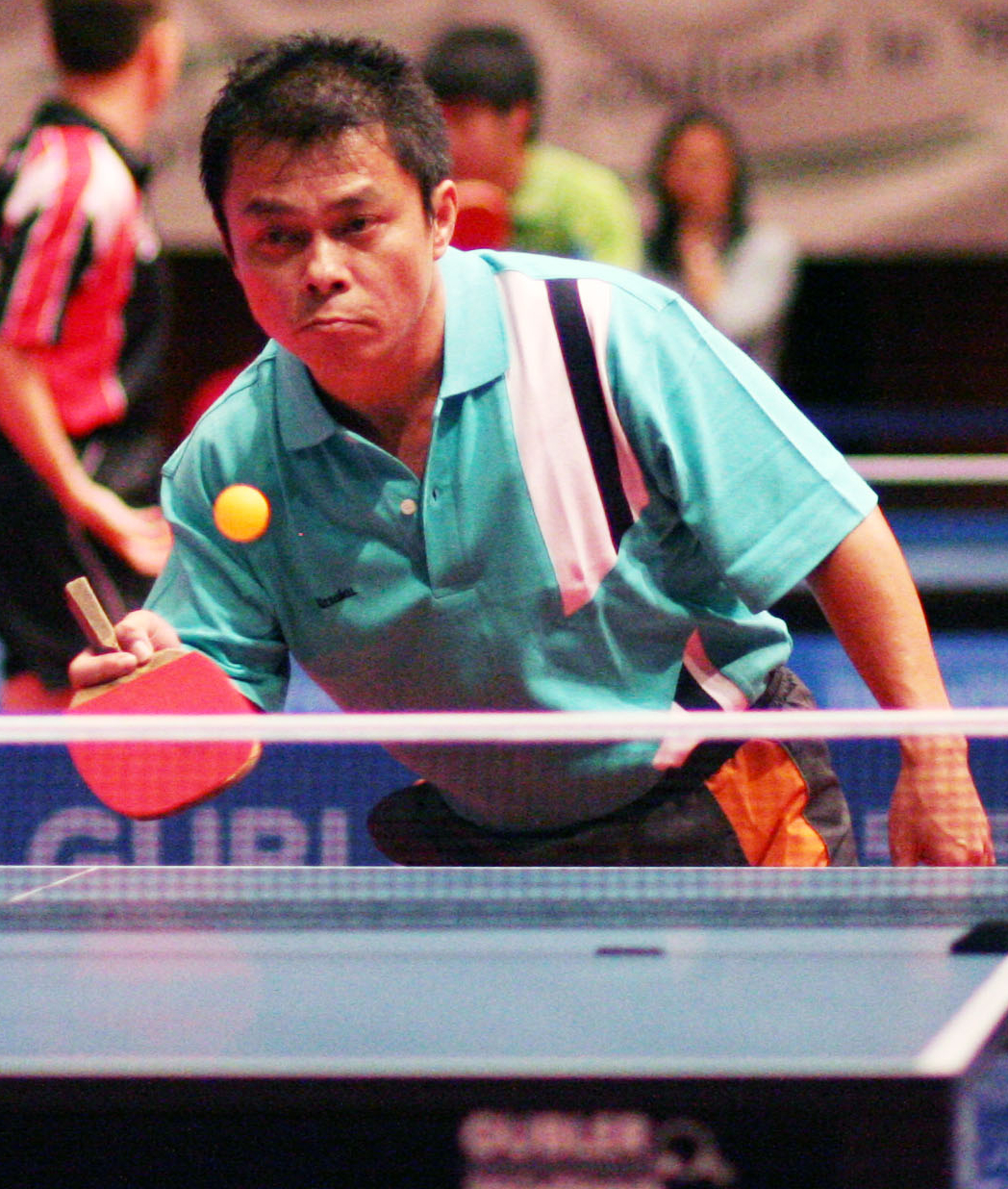
- Hsu at the 2006 World Para Table Tennis Championships

Personal information
- Born: 22 June 1963 (age 63) Kaohsiung, Taiwan

Sport
- Sport: Table tennis
- Playing style: Right-handed penhold
- Disability class: 9
- Highest ranking: 2 (July 1999)
Medal record
Men's para table tennis
Representing Chinese Taipei
Paralympic Games
Bronze medal – third place	1996 Atlanta	Open singles standing
Bronze medal – third place	2000 Sydney	Teams C9
Bronze medal – third place	2004 Athens	Teams C9
World Championships
Silver medal – second place	2002 Taipei	Singles C9
Silver medal – second place	2002 Taipei	Teams C9
FESPIC Games
Gold medal – first place	1999 Bangkok	Teams C9
Silver medal – second place	1999 Bangkok	Singles C9
Silver medal – second place	1999 Bangkok	Open singles standing
Silver medal – second place	2002 Busan	Teams C9
Bronze medal – third place	2002 Busan	Singles C9
Asia and Oceania Championships
Silver medal – second place	2005 Kuala Lumpur	Teams C9
Bronze medal – third place	2007 Seoul	Teams C10
FESPIC Championships
Gold medal – first place	1997 Hong Kong	Singles C9
Gold medal – first place	1997 Hong Kong	Open singles standing
Gold medal – first place	1999 Taipei	Singles C9
Gold medal – first place	1999 Taipei	Teams C9
Gold medal – first place	2001 Osaka	Teams C9
Gold medal – first place	2003 Shanghai	Singles C9
Silver medal – second place	2001 Osaka	Singles C9
Silver medal – second place	2003 Shanghai	Teams C9
Bronze medal – third place	1999 Taipei	Open singles standing

Hsu Chih-shan
- Traditional Chinese: 許志杉
- Simplified Chinese: 许志杉
Transcriptions
Standard Mandarin
- Hanyu Pinyin: Xǔ Zhìshān
- Wade–Giles: Hsu^{3} Chih^{4}-shan^{1}

Hsu Chih-shan (Chinese: 許志杉, born 22 June 1963) is a Taiwanese retired para table tennis player. He won a bronze medal at three consecutive Paralympic Games: 1996, 2000, and 2004.

He contracted polio when he was three years old, which disabled his left leg.
