= 1975 FESPIC Games =

1st FESPIC Games
- Host city: Beppu, Japan
- Nations: 18
- Athletes: 973
- Events: 8
- Opening: June 1
- Closing: June 3
- Opened by: Hirohito

The 1st FESPIC Games was a multi-sport event for Far East and South Pacific athletes with a disability held in Beppu, Japan. It opened on June 1 and closed on June 3, 1975.
