= Table tennis at the 2000 Summer Paralympics =

Table tennis at the XI Paralympic Games
- Paralympic Table tennis
- Venue: State Sports Centre
- Dates: 19-28 October 2000
- Competitors: 270 from 40 nations

Paralympic symbol (1994-2004)

Table tennis at the 2000 Summer Paralympics consisted of thirty singles and team events.

Competitors were divided into eleven classes according to the extent of their disability with lower numbered classes corresponding to more severe disabilities. Classes one through five competed in wheelchairs, and classes six through ten competed while standing.

== Medal table ==
| Rank | Nation | Gold | Silver | Bronze | Total |
|---|---|---|---|---|---|
| 1 | France (FRA) | 7 | 6 | 5 | 18 |
| 2 | South Korea (KOR) | 5 | 3 | 2 | 10 |
| 3 | China (CHN) | 4 | 2 | 1 | 7 |
| 4 | Germany (GER) | 3 | 4 | 2 | 9 |
| 5 | Czech Republic (CZE) | 3 | 3 | 3 | 9 |
| 6 | Nigeria (NGR) | 2 | 0 | 1 | 3 |
| 7 | Slovakia (SVK) | 1 | 2 | 0 | 3 |
| 8 | Spain (ESP) | 1 | 1 | 3 | 5 |
| 9 | Poland (POL) | 1 | 1 | 0 | 2 |
| 10 | Sweden (SWE) | 1 | 0 | 3 | 4 |
| 11 | Hong Kong (HKG) | 1 | 0 | 0 | 1 |
| 11 | Jordan (JOR) | 1 | 0 | 0 | 1 |
| 13 | Chinese Taipei (TPE) | 0 | 2 | 2 | 4 |
| 14 | Finland (FIN) | 0 | 1 | 1 | 2 |
| 14 | Great Britain (GBR) | 0 | 1 | 1 | 2 |
| 14 | Japan (JPN) | 0 | 1 | 1 | 2 |
| 17 | Austria (AUT) | 0 | 1 | 0 | 1 |
| 17 | Israel (ISR) | 0 | 1 | 0 | 1 |
| 17 | Yugoslavia (YUG) | 0 | 1 | 0 | 1 |
| 20 | Switzerland (SUI) | 0 | 0 | 2 | 2 |
| 21 | Netherlands (NED) | 0 | 0 | 1 | 1 |
| 21 | Ukraine (UKR) | 0 | 0 | 1 | 1 |
| 21 | United States (USA) | 0 | 0 | 1 | 1 |
| Totals (23 entries) | | 30 | 30 | 30 | 90 |

=== Participating nations ===
- Argentina (5)
- Australia (2)
- Austria (8)
- Belgium (5)
- Brazil (5)
- Canada (2)
- China (8)
- Chinese Taipei (12)
- Croatia (4)
- Czech Republic (12)
- Denmark (3)
- Finland (3)
- France (29)
- Germany (20)
- Great Britain (14)
- Hong Kong (7)
- Hungary (3)
- Ireland (4)
- Israel (1)
- Italy (7)
- Jamaica (1)
- Japan (12)
- Jordan (2)
- Mexico (6)
- Netherlands (4)
- Nigeria (7)
- Norway (2)
- Poland (12)
- Portugal (1)
- Russia (1)
- Slovakia (7)
- Slovenia (2)
- South Africa (6)
- South Korea (15)
- Spain (8)
- Sweden (10)
- Switzerland (4)
- Ukraine (4)
- United States (9)
- Yugoslavia (1)

== Events ==
=== Men's events ===
| Event | Gold | Silver | Bronze |
|---|---|---|---|
| Singles 1 | Hae Gon Lee; South Korea | Matti Launonen; Finland | Rolf Zumkehr; Switzerland |
| Singles 2 | Kyung Mook Kim; South Korea | Kong Yong Kim; South Korea | Martin Zvolanek; Czech Republic |
| Singles 3 | Jean-Philippe Robin; France | Zlatko Kesler; Yugoslavia | Michel Peeters; France |
| Singles 4 | Michal Stefanu; Czech Republic | Tae Hyung Um; South Korea | Kyoung Sik Choi; South Korea |
| Singles 5 | Christophe Durand; France | Chang Shen Chou; Chinese Taipei | Manuel Robles; Spain |
| Singles 6 | Johnny Eriksson; Sweden | Daniel Arnold; Germany | Mattias Karlsson; Sweden |
| Singles 7 | Jochen Wollmert; Germany | Zeev Glikman; Israel | Stéphane Messi; France |
| Singles 8 | Alvaro Valera; Spain | Alain Pichon; France | Kimmo Jokinen; Finland |
| Singles 9 | Tajudeen Agunbiade; Nigeria | Stanisław Frączyk; Austria | Femi Alabi; Nigeria |
| Singles 10 | Ivan Karabec; Czech Republic | Jose Manuel Ruiz; Spain | Fredrik Andersson; Sweden |
| Singles 11 | Piotr Skrobut; Poland | Tomasz Wojtas; Poland | Angel Garrido; Spain |
| Teams 1-2 | South Korea (KOR); Seong Hoon Kang; Hae Gon Lee; Kong Yong Kim; Kyung Mook Kim | Czech Republic (CZE); Tomas Pribyl; Martin Zvolanek | France (FRA); Marc Sorabella; Vincent Boury; Erwan Fouillen; Jean Patrick d'Ivoley-Boggs |
| Teams 3 | France (FRA); Michel Peeters; Jean-Philippe Robin; Pascal Verger | Great Britain (GBR); James Rawson; Neil Robinson; Stefan Trofan | South Korea (KOR); Heung Sik Yang; Ji Yong Son; Young Soo Kim |
| Teams 4 | France (FRA); Bruno Benedetti; Emeric Martin; Christophe Pinna | South Korea (KOR); Tae Hyung Um; Park Jun-young; Kyoung Sik Choi | Czech Republic (CZE); Frantisek Glazar; Michal Stefanu; Lubomir Trcka |
| Teams 5 | South Korea (KOR); Eun Chang Jung; Byoung Young Kim | Chinese Taipei (TPE); Chang Shen Chou; Yen Hung Lin | Sweden (SWE); Jan-Krister Gustavsson; Ernst Bolldén |
| Teams 6-7 | Germany (GER); Daniel Arnold; Christian Koppelberg; Thomas Kurfess | France (FRA); Jean Yves Abbadie; Stéphane Messi | United States (USA); Norman Bass; Joshua Bartel |
| Teams 8 | South Korea (KOR); Kwang Jin Kim; Cheon Sik Lee | France (FRA); Alain Pichon; Michel Schaller; Julien Soyer | Germany (GER); Jochen Wollmert; Thomas Schmitt; Dirk Hudarin |
| Teams 9 | Nigeria (NGR); Tunde Adisa; Tajudeen Agunbiade; Femi Alabi | Slovakia (SVK); Richard Csejtey; Ladislav Gaspar | Chinese Taipei (TPE); Ting Sung Hou; Chih Shan Hsu; Ming Fu Hu; Hsiu Hsien Lin |
| Teams 10 | France (FRA); Olivier Chateigner; François Sérignat; Gilles de la Bourdonnaye | Czech Republic (CZE); Lubomir Masek; Miroslav Cinibulk; Pavel Cech | Spain (ESP); Enrique Agudo; Jose Manuel Ruiz |

=== Women's events ===
| Event | Gold | Silver | Bronze |
|---|---|---|---|
| Singles 1-2 | Maha Al-Bargouti; Jordan | Isabelle Lafaye Marziou; France | Catherine Mitton; Great Britain |
| Singles 3 | Alena Kánová; Slovakia | Satoko Fujiwara; Japan | Monika Bartheidel; Germany |
| Singles 4 | Christiane Pape; Germany | Monika Sikora; Germany | Alice Rast; Switzerland |
| Singles 5 | Wei Hong Chen; China | Gui Xiang Ren; China | Jitka Pivarčiová; Czech Republic |
| Singles 6-8 | Xiaoling Zhang; China | Bernadette Darvand; France | Martine Thierry; France |
| Singles 9 | Thu Kamkasomphou; France | Mei Li Liu; China | Fuqun Luo; China |
| Singles 10 | Jolana Davidková; Czech Republic | Michelle Sévin; France | Yasuko Kudo; Japan |
| Singles 11 | Lai Wai Ling; Hong Kong | Viera Kašparová; Slovakia | Nataliya Ivanova; Ukraine |
| Teams 1-3 | France (FRA); Isabelle Lafaye Marziou; Stephanie Mariage | Germany (GER); Monika Bartheidel; Beate Schippmann | Netherlands (NED); Gertrudis Laemers; Jolanda Paardekam |
| Teams 4-5 | China (CHN); Wei Hong Chen; Gui Xiang Ren | Germany (GER); Christiane Pape; Monika Sikora | Chinese Taipei (TPE); Mei Hui Wei; Min Hsiu Liao; Shu Chin Hsiao |
| Teams 6-10 | China (CHN); Xiaoling Zhang; Fuqun Luo; Chunmin Lu; Mei Li Liu | Czech Republic (CZE); Jolana Davidkova; Jana Mojova; Eva Pestova; Michala Zakova | France (FRA); Thu Kamkasomphou; Michelle Sévin; Martine Thierry |
