= Jitka Pivarčiová =

Czech para table tennis player

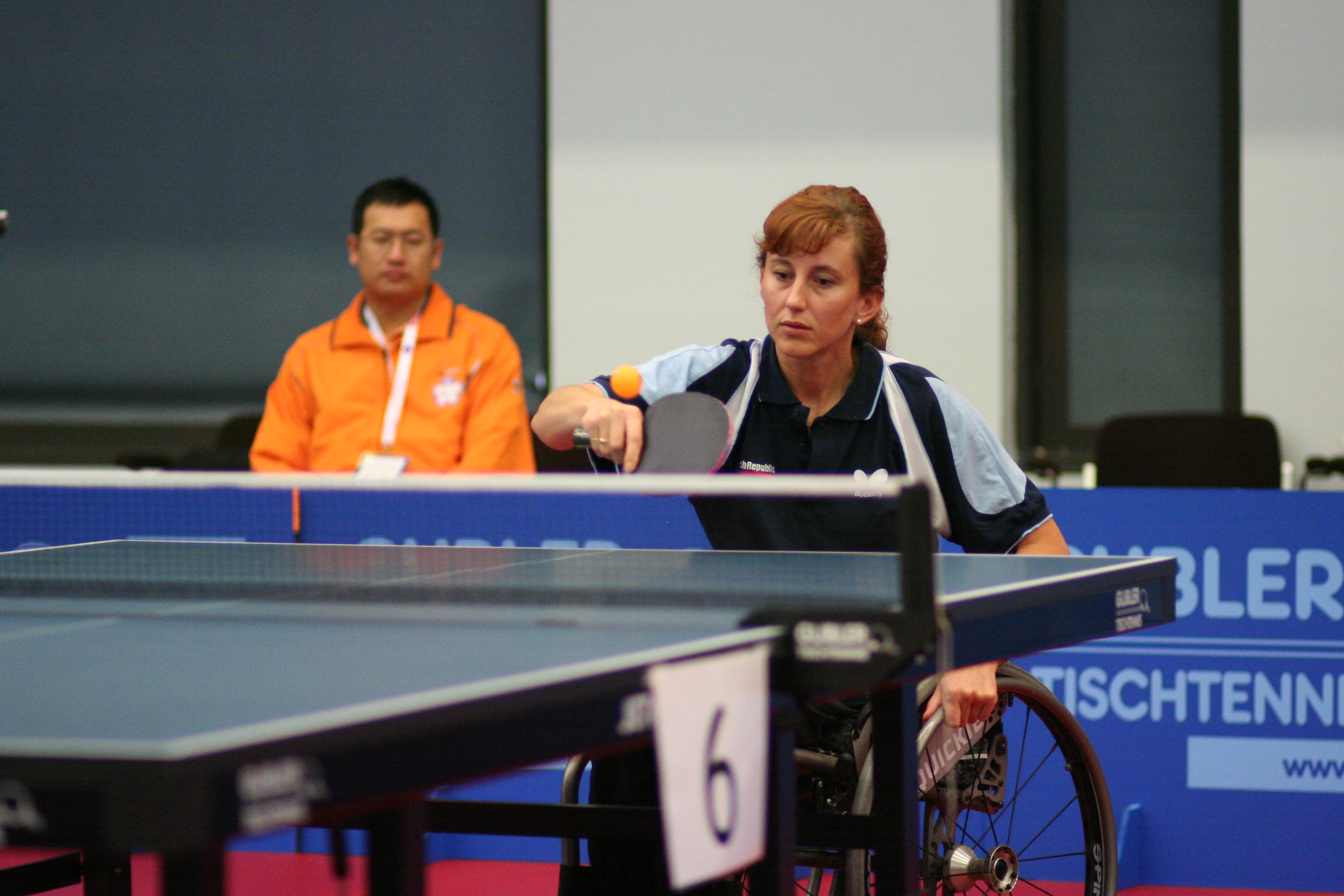
- Pivarčiová at 2006 World Championships

Personal information
- Born: 21 February 1971 (age 55)

Sport
- Sport: Para table tennis
Medal record
Representing Czech Republic
Paralympic Games
Bronze medal – third place	2000 Sydney	Singles C5
World Championships
Bronze medal – third place	1998 Paris	Singles C5
Bronze medal – third place	2002 Taipei	Singles C5
European Championships
Gold medal – first place	1997 Stockholm	Singles C5
Gold medal – first place	2001 Frankfurt	Open singles
Gold medal – first place	2003 Zagreb	Singles C5
Silver medal – second place	2001 Frankfurt	Singles C5
Bronze medal – third place	1995 Hillerød	Singles C5
Bronze medal – third place	1999 Piešťany	Singles C5
Bronze medal – third place	2005 Jesolo	Singles C5

Jitka Pivarčiová (born 21 February 1971) is a Czech retired para table tennis player who competed in international table tennis competitions. She is a Paralympic bronze medalist, two-time World bronze medalist and has three consecutive European singles titles.

Pivarčiová is native of Náchod. She is a member of Czech Para Table Tennis Hall of Fame.
