= Wei Mei-hui =

Taiwanese para table tennis player

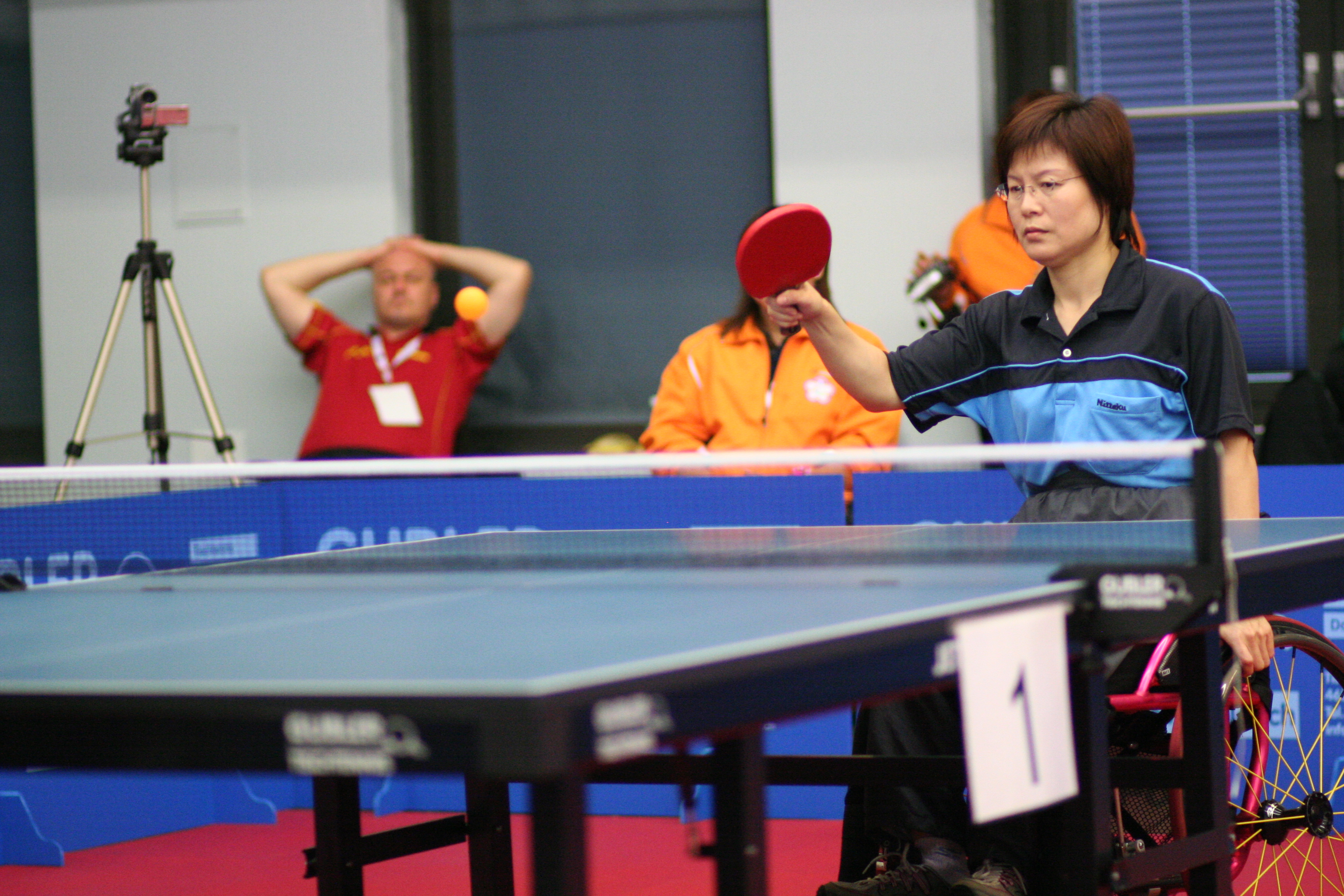
- Wei at the 2006 World Para Table Tennis Championships

Personal information
- Born: 18 August 1963 (age 62) Taichung, Taiwan
- Height: 153 cm (5 ft 0 in)
- Weight: 49 kg (108 lb)

Sport
- Sport: Table tennis
- Playing style: Right-handed shakehand grip
- Disability class: 5
- Highest ranking: 1 (January 2006)
Medal record
Women's para table tennis
Representing Chinese Taipei
Paralympic Games
Silver medal – second place	2004 Athens	Teams C4–5
Bronze medal – third place	2000 Sydney	Teams C4–5
Bronze medal – third place	2004 Athens	Singles C5
World Championships
Silver medal – second place	2002 Taipei	Teams C5
Bronze medal – third place	2006 Montreux	Singles C5
Bronze medal – third place	2006 Montreux	Teams C5
Asian Para Games
Bronze medal – third place	2010 Guangzhou	Teams C4–5
Bronze medal – third place	2014 Incheon	Teams C4–5
FESPIC Games
Gold medal – first place	1999 Bangkok	Singles C5
Silver medal – second place	1999 Bangkok	Teams C3–5
Silver medal – second place	2002 Busan	Singles C5
Silver medal – second place	2002 Busan	Teams C5
Silver medal – second place	2006 Kuala Lumpur	Singles C5
Silver medal – second place	2006 Kuala Lumpur	Teams C4–5
Asian Championships
Silver medal – second place	2005 Kuala Lumpur	Teams C5
Silver medal – second place	2007 Seoul	Teams C4–5
Bronze medal – third place	2013 Beijing	Teams C4–5
FESPIC Championships
Gold medal – first place	1999 Taipei	Singles C5
Gold medal – first place	1999 Taipei	Doubles C1–5
Gold medal – first place	1999 Taipei	Teams C5
Silver medal – second place	2001 Osaka	Teams C5
Bronze medal – third place	1997 Hong Kong	Singles C5
Bronze medal – third place	1999 Taipei	Open singles in wheelchair
Bronze medal – third place	2001 Osaka	Singles C5
Bronze medal – third place	2003 Shanghai	Singles C4–5
Bronze medal – third place	2003 Shanghai	Open singles in wheelchair

Wei Mei-hui (Chinese: 魏美惠; pinyin: Wèi Měihuì, born 18 August 1963) is a Taiwanese retired para table tennis player. She has won three medals from the 2000 Summer Paralympics and 2004 Summer Paralympics.

Wei is a polio survivor. She has a twin sister who is not disabled. She began playing table tennis in 1990.
