= Hsiao Shu-chin =

Taiwanese para table tennis player

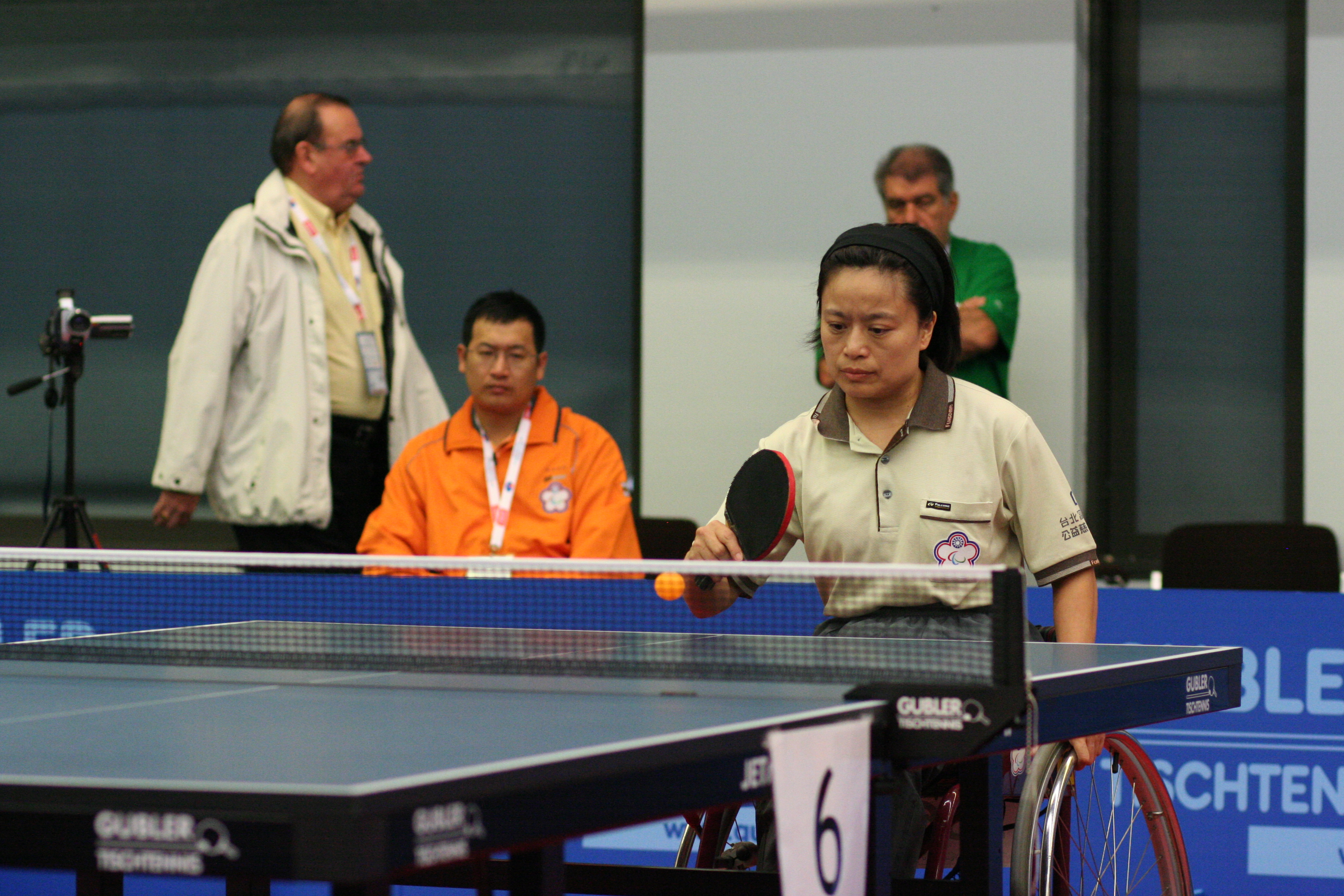
- Hsiao at the 2006 World Para Table Tennis Championships

Personal information
- Born: 5 May 1960 (age 66) Taipei, Taiwan

Sport
- Sport: Table tennis
- Playing style: Right-handed shakehand grip
- Disability class: 5
- Highest ranking: 5 (October 2002)
- Current ranking: 11 (February 2020)
Medal record
Women's para table tennis
Representing Chinese Taipei
Paralympic Games
| Silver medal – second place | 2004 Athens | Teams C4–5 |
| Bronze medal – third place | 2000 Sydney | Teams C4–5 |
World Championships
| Silver medal – second place | 2002 Taipei | Teams C5 |
| Bronze medal – third place | 2002 Taipei | Open singles in wheelchair |
| Bronze medal – third place | 2006 Montreux | Teams C5 |
| Bronze medal – third place | 2018 Lasko | Singles C5 |
FESPIC Games
| Silver medal – second place | 1999 Bangkok | Teams C3–5 |
| Silver medal – second place | 2002 Busan | Teams C5 |
| Bronze medal – third place | 1999 Bangkok | Singles C5 |
| Bronze medal – third place | 1999 Bangkok | Open singles in wheelchair |
| Bronze medal – third place | 2002 Busan | Singles C5 |
| Bronze medal – third place | 2002 Busan | Open singles in wheelchair |
Asian Championships
| Bronze medal – third place | 2013 Beijing | Singles C5 |
| Bronze medal – third place | 2013 Beijing | Teams C4–5 |
| Bronze medal – third place | 2017 Beijing | Singles C5 |
| Bronze medal – third place | 2017 Beijing | Teams C4–5 |
FESPIC Championships
| Gold medal – first place | 1999 Taipei | Teams C5 |
| Silver medal – second place | 1997 Hong Kong | Open singles in wheelchair |
| Bronze medal – third place | 1999 Taipei | Singles C5 |

Hsiao Shu-chin
- Traditional Chinese: 蕭淑卿
- Simplified Chinese: 萧淑卿
Transcriptions
Standard Mandarin
- Hanyu Pinyin: Xiāo Shūqīng

Hsiao Shu-chin (Chinese: 蕭淑卿, born 5 May 1960) is a Taiwanese para table tennis player. She won a bronze medal at the 2000 Summer Paralympics and a silver at the 2004 Summer Paralympics.

Hsiao is a polio survivor. She worked in the Presidential Office Building.
