= María Hoffmann =

Mexican para table tennis player

Personal information
- Born: 10 May 1950 (age 76) Mexico City, Mexico

Sport
- Sport: Para table tennis
- Disability: Polio
Medal record
Representing Mexico
Paralympic Games
Silver medal – second place	1996 Atlanta	Singles C5
World Championships
Gold medal – first place	1998 Paris	Singles C5
Silver medal – second place	1998 Paris	Open singles wheelchair
Bronze medal – third place	1998 Paris	Teams C4-5
Parapan American Games
Gold medal – first place	1999 Mexico City	Singles C5
Gold medal – first place	1999 Mexico City	Teams C4-5
Gold medal – first place	1999 Mexico City	Open singles wheelchair
Pan American Championships
Gold medal – first place	2001 Buenos Aires	Singles C4-5
Gold medal – first place	2001 Buenos Aires	Open singles wheelchair
Gold medal – first place	2003 Brasilia	Singles C5
Gold medal – first place	2003 Brasilia	Teams C4-5
Gold medal – first place	2003 Brasilia	Open singles wheelchair

María Cristina Hoffmann Torres (born 10 May 1950) is a Mexican retired para table tennis player who competed at international table tennis competitions, she was most notable for being the first Mexican woman to win a medal in table tennis at the Paralympics.

In 2016, Hoffmann was awarded to have the highest recognition for para sports, the National Sports Award, for her services to para table tennis and was considered as one of the best wheelchair table tennis players of the 20th century.
