= Chiang Chih-chung =

Taiwanese Paralympic athlete

Personal information
- Born: 20 February 1980 (age 46) Kaohsiung, Taiwan

Sport
- Sport: Paralympic athletics
- Disability class: F13
- Event: Javelin throw
Medal record
Track and field
Paralympic Games
Gold medal – first place	2000 Sydney	Men's javelin F13
Gold medal – first place	2004 Athens	Men's javelin F13
World Para Athletics Championships
Gold medal – first place	2002 Lille	Javelin throw F13
Gold medal – first place	2013 Lyon	Javelin throw F12/13
Asian Para Games
Silver medal – second place	2010 Guangzhou	Javelin throw F13
Bronze medal – third place	2014 Incheon	Discus throw F12

Chiang Chih-chung (Chinese: 江志忠; pinyin: Jiāng Zhìzhōng) is a Taiwanese javelin thrower. He is Chinese Taipei's most successful representative at the Paralympic Games, having won two gold medals, in 2000 and 2004. He competes in the F13 category for athletes with visual disabilities. He set a world record at the Sydney Games with a throw of 57.28 metres, before setting a new world record in Athens with a throw of 59.38 metres.

At the International Blind Sports Federation World Championships and Games in Brazil in 2007, Chiang won a gold medal in the javelin, silver in the discus and bronze in shot put. As of January 2008, he had won seven gold medals in international competitions.

In 2004, Chiang was awarded the Order of Brilliant Star with Cravat in recognition of his Paralympic performances.

He was due to represent Chinese Taipei again at the 2008 Summer Paralympics in Beijing, but was barred from attending by the International Paralympic Committee. The Taipei Times reported that no reason was given for the ban, even after the Chinese Taipei Paralympic Committee had requested an explanation from the IPC. A representative of the CTPC stated that the People's Republic of China may have "interfered for political reasons" to prevent Chiang from participating in the Games. The Taipei Times article was subsequently reproduced on the Taiwanese government's website.

Chiang is an Aboriginal Taiwanese, of the Bunun people, and originates from Kaohsiung County. He developed a severe visual impairment after getting cement residue and sweat in his eyes while working on a construction site. He was subsequently diagnosed with near-total vision loss.
