= 2006 FESPIC Games =

Multi-sport event

9th FESPIC Games
- Host city: Kuala Lumpur, Malaysia
- Motto: The Pursuit of Equality in Sports and Life
- Nations: 46
- Athletes: 3641
- Events: 542 in 19 sports
- Opening: 25 November
- Closing: 1 December
- Opened by: Abdullah Ahmad Badawi; Prime Minister of Malaysia
- Athlete's Oath: Lee Seng Chow
- Torch lighter: Razali Jaafar, Hisham Khaironi, Choo Kam Chan and David Wang
- Main venue: KLFA Stadium
- Website: 2006 FESPIC Games

The 2006 FESPIC Games (Far East and South Pacific Games for the Disabled), officially known as the 9th and Final FESPIC Games, was an Asia-Pacific disabled multi-sport event held in Kuala Lumpur, Malaysia, from 25 November to 1 December 2006. This was the first and last time Malaysia hosted the games. Malaysia is the eighth and the last FESPIC organisation member to host the FESPIC games after Japan, Australia, Hong Kong, Indonesia, China, Thailand, and South Korea. Around 3,641 athletes from 46 nations competed at the games which featured 19 sports. The games was opened by Prime Minister of Malaysia, Abdullah Ahmad Badawi at the KLFA stadium.

The final medal tally was led by China, followed by Thailand, South Korea, and host Malaysia. After the closing ceremony, FESPIC Federation was officially dissolved and its members were absorbed by 2 areas of the IPC: Asia and Oceania, with the event succeeded by the Asian Para Games.

== Host city ==
Malaysia, New Zealand and Hong Kong submitted their bids to the FESPIC Federation to host the games in 1999 and present them at the FESPIC Executive Committee Meeting in January 2000 in Seoul, South Korea. However, both New Zealand and Hong Kong later voluntarily withdrawn their bids after sometime and Kuala Lumpur was chosen as the games host city.

== Development and preparation ==
The KL'06 9th FESPIC Games Organising Committee was formed to oversee the staging of the games.

=== Venues ===
The Final FESPIC Games had 20 venues for the games. 11 in Kuala Lumpur, 7 in Selangor and two stand-alone venues in Putrajaya and Negeri Sembilan respectively.

State	Competition Venue	Sports
Kuala Lumpur	National Sports Complex, Malaysia
Kuala Lumpur	Bukit Jalil National Stadium	Athletics
Kuala Lumpur	National Aquatic Centre	Swimming
Kuala Lumpur	Putra Indoor Stadium	Table tennis
Kuala Lumpur	Stand-Alone Venues
Kuala Lumpur	KLFA Stadium	Opening and closing ceremony
Kuala Lumpur	National Archery Centre, Keramat	Archery
Kuala Lumpur	Titiwangsa Stadium, Kuala Lumpur	Badminton
Kuala Lumpur	Bukit Kiara Sports Complex	Boccia, Lawn bowls
Kuala Lumpur	OCM Indoor Sports Arena, Kuala Lumpur	Fencing
Kuala Lumpur	National Tennis Centre, Jalan Duta	Wheelchair Tennis
Kuala Lumpur	Kuala Lumpur Badminton Stadium, Cheras	Powerlifting
Kuala Lumpur	Mega Lanes Endah Parade, Sri Petaling	Bowling
Selangor	Universiti Putra Malaysia	Judo
Selangor	Subang Shooting Range	Shooting
Selangor	Maybank Sports Complex, Bangi	Football
Selangor	Bank Simpanan Nasional Training Centre, Bangi	Football
Selangor	Petronas Management Training Centre	Sitting Volleyball
Selangor	Malawati Stadium, Shah Alam	Wheelchair Basketball
Selangor	Bangi Rehabilitation and Industrial Training Centre	Goalball
Putrajaya	Sepang International Circuit	Cycling
Negeri Sembilan	Admiral Marina and Leisure Club, Port Dickson	Sailing

== Symbols ==
"Ujang" and "Che Mek", the mousedeers, the official mascots of the games.

The 2006 FESPIC Games logo is a heart-shape image which represents the spirit, passion and tradition of the FESPIC Games. The initial KL in the logo, represents Kuala Lumpur, the capital city of Malaysia as the venue of the Games, and the '06 represents to the year 2006. The official mascot of the 2006 FESPIC Games is a pair of mousedeer named "Ujang", the male one and its female counterpart, "Cek Mek". The adoption of mousedeer as the games' mascot is to represent the courage of the Paralympic athletes in overcoming challenges and the odds. The names of the mascots, Ujang and Che Mek, are common nicknames for local Malay youths.

== The games ==
=== Opening and closing ceremonies ===
The opening ceremony was held on 25 November 2006 at the KLFA Stadium. The ceremony begins with the marching of the Malaysian Armed Forces along with the mascots of the games. This was followed by the firework display and the marching of the contingents of the participating nations. Abdullah Ahmad Badawi, then Prime minister of Malaysia, declared the games opened. Lee Seng Chow, the blind discus throw athlete then take the oath on behalf of the athletes. Finally the torch was lit by four Malaysian paralympic athletes, Razali Jaafar, Hisham Khaironi, Choo Kam Chan and David Wang.

Meanwhile, the closing ceremony was held on 1 December 2006 at the KLFA Stadium.

=== Sports ===
- Archery
- Athletics
- Powerlifting
- Bowling
- Boccia
- Cycling
- Wheelchair fencing
- Football 7-a-side
- Judo
- Lawn bowls
- Sailing
- Shooting
- Swimming
- Badminton
- Ten-pin bowling
- Sitting volleyball
- Table tennis
- Wheelchair basketball
- Wheelchair tennis

=== Medal table ===
A total of 1476 medals, comprising 542 Gold medals, 476 Silver medals, 458 Bronze medals were awarded to athletes. The host Malaysia's performance was their best ever yet and was placed fourth overall amongst participating nations.

* Host nation (Malaysia)

2006 FESPIC Games medal table
Rank	NPC	Gold	Silver	Bronze	Total
1	China (CHN)	199	72	36	307
2	Thailand (THA)	61	43	47	151
3	South Korea (KOR)	58	42	43	143
4	Malaysia (MAS)*	44	59	71	174
5	Iran (IRI)	36	43	26	105
6	Japan (JPN)	28	33	38	99
7	Hong Kong (HKG)	25	30	23	78
8	Chinese Taipei	18	29	22	69
9	Australia (AUS)	15	17	23	55
10	Vietnam (VIE)	9	27	32	68
11	Singapore (SIN)	7	5	5	17
12	India (IND)	5	8	19	32
13	Myanmar	5	2	4	11
14	Indonesia (INA)	3	8	10	21
15	Macau (MAC)	3	3	4	10
16	Wallis et Futuna (WLF)	3	0	2	5
17	Jordan (JOR)	3	0	0	3
18	Sri Lanka (SRI)	2	15	10	27
19	Iraq (IRQ)	2	5	2	9
20	Philippines (PHI)	2	4	8	14
21	New Caledonia (NCL)	2	4	3	9
22	United Arab Emirates (UAE)	2	3	1	6
23	Bahrain (BHR)	2	3	0	5
24	Fiji (FIJ)	2	0	5	7
25	Pakistan (PAK)	1	5	3	9
26	Kazakhstan (KAZ)	1	4	2	7
27	Turkmenistan (TKM)	1	4	1	6
28	Kuwait (KUW)	1	2	8	11
29	Qatar (QAT)	1	0	2	3
30	Kiribati (KIR)	1	0	0	1
31	New Zealand (NZL)	0	3	2	5
32	Mongolia (MGL)	0	1	3	4
33	Bhutan (BHU)	0	1	1	2
34	Uzbekistan (UZB)	0	1	0	1
35	Brunei (BRU)	0	0	1	1
35	Timor-Leste (TLS)	0	0	1	1
Totals (36 entries)		542	476	458	1,476

Preceded by Busan	FESPIC Games; Kuala Lumpur; IX FESPIC Games (2006)	Succeeded by Guangzhou
