= Lin Tzu-hui =

Taiwanese powerlifter (born 1981)

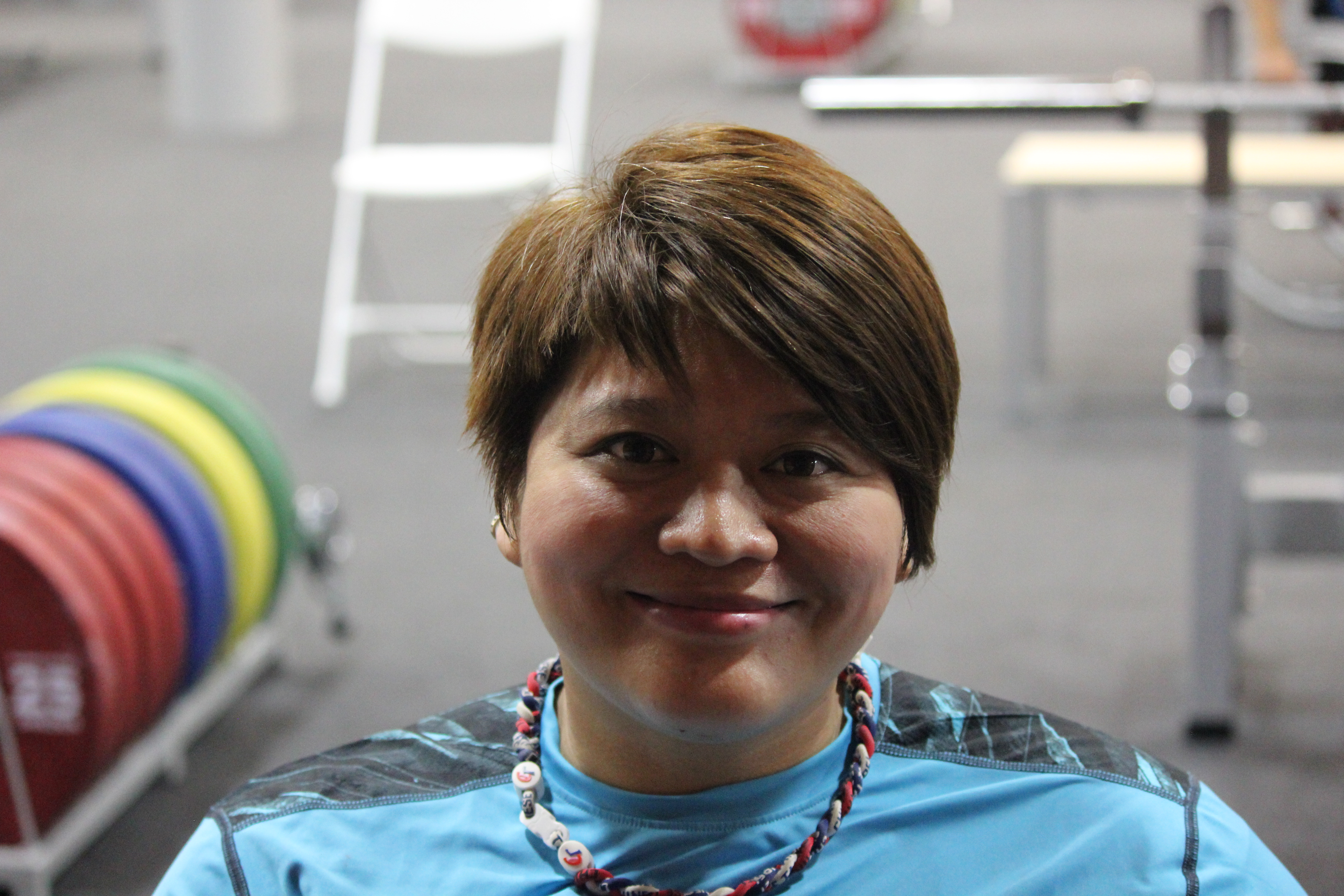
- Lin in 2016

Personal information
- Nationality: Taiwan
- Born: 5 November 1981 (age 44) Changhua County, Taiwan

Sport
- Country: Chinese Taipei
- Sport: Powerlifting
- Event: 79 kilogram class
Medal record
Representing Chinese Taipei
Women's powerlifting
Paralympic Games
Gold medal – first place	2004 Athens	−75 kg
Gold medal – first place	2008 Beijing	−75 kg
Bronze medal – third place	2012 London	−75 kg
Bronze medal – third place	2016 Rio de Janeiro	−79 kg
World Championships
Gold medal – first place	2006 Busan	–82.5 kg
Gold medal – first place	2014 Dubai	–79 kg
Bronze medal – third place	2017 Mexico City	–79 kg
Asian Para Games
Gold medal – first place	2010 Guangzhou	75kg
Gold medal – first place	2014 Incheon	79kg
Bronze medal – third place	2018 Jakarta	79kg
- Updated on 7 September 2016

Lin Tzu-hui (Chinese: 林資惠; pinyin: Lín Zīhuì; born 1 November 1981) is a Taiwanese powerlifter. She held the world record in her class after lifting 129 kg.

== Life ==
She was born in 1981.

She competed in the 2004 in Athens and the 2008 Summer Paralympics in Beijing and won a gold medal in each.

She was banned for two years in 2008 as part of anti-doping regulations.

She competed in the 2012 Summer Paralympics in London and achieved a Bronze Medal (less than 75 kg). She qualified for the 2016 Summer Paralympics in Rio, and was also the flag bearer for Chinese Taipei.

She held the world record in 2014 after lifting 129 kg which was the highest for a woman in her class.
