= FESPIC Games =

Multi-sport event in Asia

- Motto: Overcoming Challenges, Inspiring Others
- Purpose: Multi-sport event for disable of the Asia-Pacific Region
- Frequency: Every four years
- Inaugurated: 1975
- Most recent: 2006 FESPIC Games in Kuala Lumpur
- President: Dr. Kazuo Hatada
- Headquarters: Japan
- Website: FESPIC Federation

The FESPIC Games or the Far East and South Pacific Games for the Disabled, was a multi-sport event in Asia and the South Pacific region which is considered to be a precursor to the Asian Para Games, as two of its edition games in 1999 (7th) and 2002 (8th) were held parallel to the 1998 Asian Games and the 2002 Asian Games.

The event which started in 1975 was held nine times, and last contested in December 2006 in Kuala Lumpur, Malaysia.

== Objectives ==
- To promote general interest and welfare for the disabled in the region through participation in sports events and other activities
- To deepen mutual understanding and friendship of the disabled
- To promote rehabilitation for the disabled in the region through sports activities

== History ==
The first FESPIC Games was held in Oita, Japan in 1975. There were limited opportunities for persons with disabilities in Asia and the Pacific to participate in sports at the time. The FESPIC Games was launched to address this issue and promote understanding toward disabled persons in each country, as well as improve their social welfare.

The number of participant countries increased during FESPIC history. Central Asian countries Kazakhstan, Uzbekistan, Kyrgyzstan, Turkmenistan and Tajikistan, as well as Armenia and Azerbaijan, first participated in the 7th FESPIC Games in 1999. The Middle Eastern countries were allowed to compete in the 9th FESPIC Games in 2006, along with East Timor. Middle East countries were previously not allowed to compete in FESPIC Games from 1975 to 2002 because these countries were Africa/Middle Eastern members.

== List of FESPIC Games ==
Host cities of the FESPIC Games

Of all the nine editions of the FESPIC Games, two of them, the 1999 and 2002 editions were held in the same host city as the Asian Games. The 9th FESPIC Games was the last and final edition of the series which took place in 2006. For Asian countries, the FESPIC Games was replaced by the Asian Para Games, starting with the inaugural 2010 Asian Para Games which was held in Guangzhou, China after the 16th Asian Games.

Edition	Year	Host city	Host nation	Start Date	End Date	Sports	Nations	Competitors
1	1975	Oita	Japan	1 June	3 June	8	18	973
2	1977	Parramatta	Australia	20 November	26 November	13	15	430
3	1982	Sha Tin	Hong Kong	31 October	7 November		23	744
4	1986	Solo	Indonesia	31 August	7 September		19	834
5	1989	Kobe	Japan	15 September	20 September		41	1,646
6	1994	Beijing	China	4 September	10 September		42	2,081
7	1999	Bangkok	Thailand	10 January	16 January	15	34	2,258
8	2002	Busan	South Korea	26 October	1 November	17	40	2,199
9	2006	Kuala Lumpur	Malaysia	25 November	1 December	19	46	3,641

=== Youth Games ===
One Youth Games was held in Hong Kong and serves as the precursor to the Asian Youth Para Games.

Year	Host city	Host nation	Start Date	End Date	Sports	Nations	Competitors
2003	Kowloon-Sha Tin	Hong Kong	24 December	27 December		15	584

== Sports ==
- Athletics
- Cycling
- Football 7 A-Side
- Powerlifting
- Judo
- Chess

Target Sports

- Archery
- Fencing
- Target Shooting

Water Sports

- Sailing
- Swimming

Ball Sports

- Badminton
- Boccia
- Ten-Pin Bowling
- Goalball
- Lawn Bowls
- Sitting Volleyball
- Table tennis
- Wheelchair Basketball
- Wheelchair Tennis

== See also ==
- Asian Games
- Asian Para Games
- Disabled sport
- International Paralympic Committee
