= 1999 FESPIC Games =

7th FESPIC Games

VII FESPIC Games
- Host city: Bangkok, Thailand
- Motto: Equality in one world
- Nations: 34
- Athletes: 2,258
- Events: 464 in 15 sports
- Opening: 10 January
- Closing: 16 January
- Opened by: Maha Vajiralongkorn; Crown Prince of Thailand
- Main venue: Thammasat Stadium
- Website: fespicgames.net

The 1999 FESPIC Games, officially known as the 7th FESPIC Games, was an Asia-Pacific disabled multi-sport event held in Bangkok, Thailand from 10 to 16 January 1999, 20 days after the 1998 Asian Games. Was the first of the two editions of the Games to have held at the same host city as the Asian Games, the other being the 2002 FESPIC Games in Busan, South Korea.

It was the first time Thailand hosted the games. Thailand is the sixth FESPIC organisation member to host the FESPIC games after Japan, Australia, Hong Kong, Indonesia and China. Around 2,258 athletes from 34 nations competed at the games which featured 464 events in 15 sports. The games was opened by the Crown Prince of Thailand, Maha Vajiralongkorn at the Thammasat Stadium.

== Development and preparation ==
=== Venues ===
Thammasat University (Rangsit Centre)

- Main Stadium (opening and closing ceremonies, Athletics and Football 7-a-side)
- Aquatic Center (Swimming)
- Gymnasium 1 (Wheelchair Basketball, Boccia)
- Gymnasium 2 (Badminton)
- Gymnasium 3 (Sitting Volleyball)
- Gymnasium 4 (Fencing)
- Gymnasium 5 (Table tennis)
- Gymnasium 6 (Goalball)
- Gymnasium 7 (Judo)
- Field 2 (Archery)
- Field 3 (Wheelchair Tennis)
- Basketball Practicing Gymnasium (Powerlifting)

Huamark

- Shooting Range (Shooting)

== Symbols ==
Siamese Cat, the official mascot of the games.

The emblem of the 1999 FESPIC Games is a graphic design of a disabled person surging forward on a speeding wheelchair under a Thai gable, which symbolizing the strong determination of the participating disabled athletes to achieve victory at the games.

The mascot of the 1999 FESPIC Games is an unnamed female siamese cat in a wheelchair bearing a flaming torch with its tail, represents the Games being the 7th edition of the FESPIC Games.

== The games ==
=== Opening ceremony ===
The opening ceremony featured a card stunt performed by 8,000 students from the Jaturamitr Samakkee football league.

=== Sports ===
- Archery
- Athletics
- Powerlifting
- Badminton
- Bowling
- Boccia
- Fencing
- Football 7-a-side
- Judo
- Shooting
- Swimming
- Sitting volleyball
- Table tennis
- Wheelchair basketball
- Wheelchair tennis

=== Medal table ===
* Host nation (Thailand)

Rank	Nation	Gold	Silver	Bronze	Total
1	China (CHN)	205	90	45	340
2	Thailand (THA)*	65	73	82	220
3	Australia (AUS)	34	37	23	94
4	South Korea (KOR)	31	26	24	81
5	Hong Kong (HKG)	29	18	18	65
6	Japan (JPN)	27	30	26	83
7	Chinese Taipei (TPE)	16	17	19	52
8	New Caledonia (NCL)	14	8	2	24
9	Macau (MAC)	8	7	4	19
10	Myanmar (MYA)	6	14	18	38
11	India (IND)	6	7	7	20
12	Sri Lanka (SRI)	3	3	4	10
13	Tonga (TGA)	3	1	1	5
14	Vietnam (VIE)	2	2	5	9
15	Fiji (FIJ)	2	1	7	10
16	Wallis et Futuna (WLF)	2	1	5	8
17	Indonesia (INA)	2	0	1	3
18	Malaysia (MAS)	1	10	9	20
19	Singapore (SIN)	1	4	1	6
20	New Zealand (NZL)	1	2	3	6
21	Philippines (PHI)	1	2	1	4
22	Bhutan (BHU)	1	1	2	4
22	Vanuatu (VAN)	1	1	2	4
24	Mongolia (MGL)	1	1	0	2
25	Kazakhstan (KAZ)	1	0	3	4
26	Nauru (NRU)	1	0	1	2
27	Cambodia (CAM)	0	3	1	4
28	Pakistan (PAK)	0	2	0	2
29	Papua New Guinea (PNG)	0	1	0	1
Totals (29 entries)		464	362	314	1,140

== See also ==
- 1998 Asian Games

Preceded by Beijing	FESPIC Games; Bangkok; VII FESPIC Games (1999)	Succeeded by Busan
