= 2002 FESPIC Games =

8th FESPIC Games

VIII FESPIC Games
- Host city: Busan, South Korea
- Motto: A Challenge Towards Equality
- Nations: 40
- Athletes: 2199
- Events: 17 sports
- Opening: 26 October
- Closing: 1 November
- Opened by: Kim Suk-soo; Prime Minister of South Korea
- Torch lighter: Ko Ki-sun
- Main venue: Busan Asiad Stadium
- Website: fespic.or.kr

The 2002 FESPIC Games, officially known as the 8th FESPIC Games, was an Asia-Pacific disabled multi-sport event held in Busan, South Korea from 26 October to 1 November 2002, 12 days after the 2002 Asian Games. It was one of the two FESPIC Games to have held at the same host city as the Asian Games, the other being the 1999 FESPIC Games in Bangkok, Thailand.

It was the first time South Korea hosted the games as it is the seventh FESPIC organisation member to host the FESPIC games after Japan, Australia, Hong Kong, Indonesia, China, Thailand. Around 2,199 athletes from 40 nations competed at the games which featured 17 sports. The games was opened by the Prime Minister of South Korea, Kim Suk-soo at the Busan Asiad Stadium.

== Development and preparation ==
The Busan Fespic Games Organising Committee (BUFOC) was formed to oversee the staging of the games.

=== Venues ===
The 8th FESPIC Games had 16 venues for the games, 14 in Busan and 2 in South Gyeongsang.

Province	Competition Venue	Sports
Busan	Asiad Sports Complex
Busan	Busan Asiad Stadium	Athletics, Opening and closing ceremonies
Busan	Sajik Field Hockey Stadium	Lawn bowls
Busan	Sajik Swimming Pool	Swimming
Busan	Sajik Gymnasium	Table tennis
Busan	Gangseo Sports Park
Busan	Gangseo Archery Field	Archery
Busan	Gangseo Gymnasium	Fencing, Badminton
Busan	Gudeok Sports Complex
Busan	Gudeok Stadium	Football 7-a-side
Busan	Gudeok Indoor Gymnasium	Judo
Busan	Geumjeong Sports Park
Busan	Geumjeong Gymnasium	Wheelchair basketball
Busan	Geumjeong Tennis Stadium	Wheelchair tennis
Busan	Standing Alone Venues
Busan	Gangseo Road Cycling Course	Road Cycling
Busan	Gijang Gymnasium	Sitting volleyball
Busan	Dongju College Gymnasium	Goalball
Busan	Pukyong National University Gymnasium	Powerlifting
South Gyeongsang	Changwon International Shooting Range	Shooting
South Gyeongsang	Yangsan Gymnasium	Boccia

== Symbols ==
Gwidong Ih, the turtle, the official mascot of the games.

The logo of the 2002 FESPIC Games is a traditional Korean design image which resembles both a wave, the symbol of the host city, Busan, an adynamic 'Tae-geuk' mark, and a sportsman racing with a torch. It symbolizes the integration of the Asia-Pacific region through the interaction in sports and the determination of the disabled people to overcome the barriers. The sporty emblem in typical Korean colours and smooth brush strokes represents the desire for a society where those with disabilities and those without live together in harmony.

The mascot of the 2002 FESPIC Games is a turtle named "Gwidongih" (귀동이) which literally means a cute child in Korean. The mascot's name also refers to a turtle which is pronounced "gwi" (龜, 귀) when written in Chinese characters. The use of turtle as the games' mascot is to symbolize the tireless effort of disabled people towards rehabilitation and social participation. Also, the "V" sign showed by the mascot, the initial for "victory", represents the Games as a celebration of victory of Humanity.

== The games ==
=== Sports ===
- Archery
- Athletics
- Powerlifting
- Badminton
- Bowling
- Boccia
- Cycling
- Fencing
- Football 7-a-side
- Judo
- Lawn bowls
- Shooting
- Swimming
- Sitting volleyball
- Table tennis
- Wheelchair basketball
- Wheelchair tennis

=== Medal table ===
* Host nation (South Korea)

Rank	Nation	Gold	Silver	Bronze	Total
1	China (CHN)	191	90	50	331
2	South Korea (KOR)*	62	68	60	190
3	Thailand (THA)	43	48	37	128
4	Japan (JPN)	33	25	25	83
5	Hong Kong (HKG)	27	25	16	68
6	Chinese Taipei (TPE)	17	25	21	63
7	Australia (AUS)	17	17	10	44
8	New Caledonia (NCL)	7	1	2	10
9	India (IND)	5	10	10	25
10	Sri Lanka (SRI)	5	8	12	25
11	Myanmar (MYA)	4	13	4	21
12	Singapore (SIN)	3	2	4	9
13	Cambodia (CAM)	3	2	1	6
14	Vietnam (VIE)	3	1	2	6
15	Pakistan (PAK)	3	0	1	4
16	Malaysia (MAS)	2	28	37	67
17	Brunei (BRU)	2	3	2	7
18	Wallis et Futuna (WLF)	2	2	2	6
19	Mongolia (MGL)	2	0	0	2
20	Indonesia (INA)	1	1	3	5
20	Macau (MAC)	1	1	3	5
22	Fiji (FIJ)	0	5	2	7
23	New Zealand (NZL)	0	4	2	6
24	Philippines (PHI)	0	2	2	4
25	Azerbaijan (AZE)	0	1	1	2
25	Kazakhstan (KAZ)	0	1	1	2
27	Papua New Guinea (PNG)	0	1	0	1
28	Vanuatu (VAN)	0	0	2	2
29	Laos (LAO)	0	0	1	1
Totals (29 entries)		433	384	313	1,130

== See also ==
- 2002 Asian Games

Preceded by Bangkok	FESPIC Games; Busan; VIII FESPIC Games (2002)	Succeeded by Kuala Lumpur
