= List of Paralympic medalists in table tennis (men's singles) =

This is a list of male table tennis singles medalists. In the 1960 Summer Paralympics, only wheelchair users played. Standing players began to participate in the 1976 Summer Paralympics, and players with cerebral palsy competed at the 1980 Summer Paralympics.

== Wheelchair medalists ==
Class	Year	Gold	Silver	Bronze
1	1992	Matti Launonen; Finland	Ralf Kirchhoff; Germany	Lee Hae-gon; South Korea; Kang Sung-hoon; South Korea
1	1996	Lee Hae-gon; South Korea	Matti Launonen; Finland	José Daniel Haylan; Argentina; Kang Sung-hoon; South Korea
1	2000	Lee Hae-gon; South Korea	Matti Launonen; Finland	Rolf Zumkehr; Switzerland
1	2004	Holger Nikelis; Germany	Lee Hae-gon; South Korea	Walter Kilger; Germany
1	2008	Andreas Vevera; Austria	Cho Jae-kwan; South Korea	Lee Hae-gon; South Korea
1	2012	Holger Nikelis; Germany	Jean-François Ducay; France	Paul Davies; Great Britain
1	2016	Rob Davies; Great Britain	Joo Young-dae; South Korea	Nam Ki-won; South Korea
1	2020	Joo Young-dae; South Korea	Kim Hyeon-uk; South Korea	Nam Ki-won; South Korea; Thomas Matthews; Great Britain
1A	1972	Hans Rosenast; Switzerland	Nilsson; Sweden	Rolf Zumkehr; Switzerland; Rainer Kuschall; Switzerland
1A	1976	Hans Rosenast; Switzerland	Rainer Kuschall; Switzerland	Pekka Hatinen; Finland
1A	1980	Hans Rosenast; Switzerland	Rolf Zumkehr; Switzerland	Matti Launonen; Finland
1A	1984	Ralf Kirchhoff; West Germany	H. Tietze; West Germany	Matti Launonen; Finland
1A	1988	Lee Hae-gon; South Korea	Kang Sung-hoon; South Korea	Matti Launonen; Finland
1B	1972	Song Sin-Nam; South Korea	Daniel Jeannin; France	Stephen Bradshaw; Great Britain; Paul Suijkerbuijk; Netherlands
1B	1976	Stephen Bradshaw; Great Britain	Wolfgang Koch; West Germany	Walter Sailer; Austria
1B	1980	Tommy Taylor; Great Britain	G. Frank; Austria	Bruno Hassler; West Germany
1B	1984	Bruno Hassler; West Germany	Tony Edge; Great Britain	Kauko Kajaste; Finland
1B	1988	Rudolf Hajek; Austria	Bruno Hassler; West Germany	Svein Bjornar Simensen; Norway
1C	1976	Manfred Emmel; West Germany	B. Boerstler; West Germany	Gregor Bonderud; Sweden
1C	1980	Manfred Emmel; West Germany	B. Boerstler; West Germany	Daniel Jeannin; France
1C	1984	Manfred Emmel; West Germany	Daniel Jeannin; France	Rudolf Jaksch; West Germany
1C	1988	Manfred Emmel; West Germany	Rudolf Jaksch; West Germany	Daniel Jeannin; France
2	1972	Choi Tae-Am; South Korea	Leslie Lam; Hong Kong	Giuseppe Trieste; Italy; Henry Dahlgren; Norway
2	1976	Choi Tae-Am; South Korea	Leslie Lam; Hong Kong	J. Meursing; Netherlands
2	1980	Franz Mandl; Austria	Choi Tae-Am; South Korea	Gary Kerr; United States
2	1984	Werner Dorr; West Germany	Franz Mandl; Austria	Fritz Altendorfer; Austria
2	1988	Michel Peeters; France	Kim Young-soo; South Korea	Fritz Altendorfer; Austria
2	1992	Rudolf Hajek; Austria	Jari Kurkinen; Finland	Bruno Hassler; Germany; Kim Kyung-mook; South Korea
2	1996	Kim Kyung-mook; South Korea	Vincent Boury; France	Gerhard Scharf; Austria; Jari Kurkinen; Finland
2	2000	Kim Kyung-mook; South Korea	Kim Kong-yong; South Korea	Martin Zvolanek; Czech Republic
2	2004	Ján Riapoš; Slovakia	Kim Kong-yong; South Korea	Kim Kyung-mook; South Korea
2	2008	Vincent Boury; France	Stephane Molliens; France	Kim Kyung-mook; South Korea
2	2012	Ján Riapoš; Slovakia	Kim Kyung-mook; South Korea	Fabien Lamirault; France
2	2016	Fabien Lamirault; France	Rafał Czuper; Poland	Jiří Suchánek; Czech Republic
2	2020	Fabien Lamirault; France	Rafał Czuper; Poland	Cha Soo-yong; South Korea; Park Jin-cheol; South Korea
3	1972	Fritz Krimmel; West Germany	Heinz Simon; West Germany	Andre Hennaert; France; G. Monoghan; Great Britain
3	1976	Heinz Simon; West Germany	Fritz Krimmel; West Germany	Son Kum-Du; South Korea
3	1980	Chou Dong-Sik; South Korea	Engelbert Rangger; Austria	Rob Brand; Netherlands
3	1984	Heinz Simon; West Germany	Rainer Kolb; West Germany	Peter Starl; Austria
3	1988	Peter Starl; Austria	Kim Ki-hoon; South Korea	Christian Sutter; Austria
3	1992	Michel Peeters; France	Neil Robinson; Great Britain	Marcel Andrey; Switzerland; Zlatko Kesler; Independent Paralympic Participants
3	1996	Zlatko Kesler; Yugoslavia	Neil Robinson; Great Britain	James Rawson; Great Britain; Fritz Altendorfer; Austria
3	2000	Jean-Philippe Robin; France	Zlatko Kesler; Yugoslavia	Michel Peeters; France
3	2004	Kim Young-gun; South Korea	Jean-Philippe Robin; France	Zlatko Kesler; Serbia and Montenegro
3	2008	Feng Panfeng; China	Jean-Philippe Robin; France	Tomas Piñas; Spain
3	2012	Feng Panfeng; China	Zlatko Kesler; Serbia	Thomas Schmidberger; Germany
3	2016	Feng Panfeng; China	Thomas Schmidberger; Germany	Florian Merrien; France
3	2020	Feng Panfeng; China	Thomas Schmidberger; Germany	Jenson Van Emburgh; United States; Zhai Xiang; China
4	1972	Baruch Hagai; Israel	Michael Dempsey; United States	Triche; France; Paul Lyall; Great Britain
4	1980	Michael Dempsey; United States	Grady Uyt de Boogaardt; Netherlands	Loek van den Leur; Netherlands
4	1984	Thomas Kreidel; West Germany	P. Glaese; West Germany	Michael Dempsey; United States
4	1988	Thomas Kreidel; West Germany	Peter Schmidt; West Germany	Michael Dempsey; United States
4	1992	Thomas Kreidel; Germany	Bruno Benedetti; France	Um Tae-hyang; South Korea; Arnie Chan; Great Britain
4	1996	Bruno Benedetti; France	Michal Stefanu; Czech Republic	Thomas Kreidel; Germany; Christian Sutter; Austria
4	2000	Michal Stefanu; Czech Republic	Um Tae-hyung; South Korea	Choi Kyoung-sik; South Korea
4	2004	Zhang Yan; China	Michal Stefanu; Czech Republic	Choi Kyoung-sik; South Korea
4	2012	Kim Young-gun; South Korea	Zhang Yan; China	Sameh Saleh; Egypt
4	2016	Abdullah Öztürk; Turkey	Guo Xingyuan; China	Maxime Thomas; France
4	2020	Abdullah Öztürk; Turkey	Kim Young-gun; South Korea	Maxime Thomas; France; Nesim Turan; Turkey
4-5	1976	Baruch Hagai; Israel	Michael Dempsey; United States	Richard de Zutter; Belgium; Olle Johansson; Sweden
4-5	2008	Christophe Durand; France	Jung Eun-chang; South Korea	Tommy Urhaug; Norway
5	1992	Kam Shing Kwong; Hong Kong	Guy Tisserant; France	Kim So-boo; South Korea; Manuel Robles; Spain
5	1996	Guy Tisserant; France	Kam Shing Kwong; Hong Kong	Chang Shen-chou; Chinese Taipei; Ernst Bolldén; Sweden
5	2000	Christophe Durand; France	Chang Shen-chou; Chinese Taipei	Manuel Robles; Spain
5	2004	Kim Byoung-young; South Korea	Jung Eun-chang; South Korea	Christophe Durand; France
5	2012	Tommy Urhaug; Norway	Cao Ningning; China	Jung Eun-chang; South Korea
5	2016	Cao Ningning; China	Valentin Baus; Germany	Mitar Palikuća; Serbia
5	2020	Valentin Baus; Germany	Cao Ningning; China	Ali Öztürk; Turkey; Jack Hunter Spivey; Great Britain
A	1960	Tommy Taylor; Great Britain	Domenico Cascella; Italy	Michael Beck; Great Britain
A1	1964	Stefan Florescu; United States	Gerard Jacobs; Netherlands	Marion de Groot; Netherlands; Vincent Falardeau; United States
A1	1968	Dennis Post; Netherlands	Jan Erik Stenberg; Norway	Rainer Kuschall; Switzerland; Bernard McNichol; United States
A2	1964	Tommy Taylor; Great Britain	Michael Beck; Great Britain	Allan McLucas; Australia; Joseph Sharav; Israel
A2	1968	Manfred Emmel; West Germany	Nilsson; Sweden	Walter Sailer; Austria; Joseph Sharav; Israel
B	1960	Engelbert Rangger; Austria	Francesco Scalzo; Italy	Federico Zarilli; Italy
B	1964	Paul Lyall; Great Britain	Honorio Romero; Argentina	Engelbert Rangger; Austria; E. Fliessar; Austria
B	1968	Paul Lyall; Great Britain	Heinz Simon; West Germany	G. Monoghan; Great Britain; Giovanni Ferraris; Italy
C	1960	Giovanni Berghella; Italy	Moses Azzopardi; Malta	Federico Zarilli; Italy
C	1968	Baruch Hagai; Israel	T. Yamazaki; Japan	K. Otsuka; Japan; Jimmy Gibson; Great Britain
C	1968	Baruch Hagai; Israel	Richard de Zutter; Belgium	Jimmy Gibson; Ireland; Giovanni Berghella; Italy
L1	1984	Urban Andersson; Sweden	Borje Johnasson; Sweden	John Welsh; Great Britain
L2	1984	Herbert Velroyen; West Germany	M. Stephen; United States	Ilija Djurasinovic; Yugoslavia; O. Rouke; Ireland
L3	1984	Marc Piras; France	Thieu Vossen; Netherlands	Klaus Mueller; West Germany; Stephan Welting; West Germany
L4	1984	Kimmo Jokinen; Finland	Jorgen Nilsson; Sweden	Manfred Knabe; West Germany; Z. Gajic; Yugoslavia
TT2	1988	Guy Tisserant; France	Herbert Velroyen; West Germany	Michel Gauducheau; France

== Standing medalists ==
Class	Year	Gold	Silver	Bronze
6	1992	Rainer Schmidt; Germany	Brian Nielsen; Denmark	Peter Stromstedt; Sweden; Kai Lundsteen; Denmark
6	1996	Brian Nielsen; Denmark	Mattias Karlsson; Sweden	Harold Kersten; Netherlands
6	2000	Johnny Eriksson; Sweden	Daniel Arnold; Germany	Mattias Karlsson; Sweden
6	2004	Daniel Arnold; Germany	Rainer Schmidt; Germany	Peter Rosenmeier; Denmark
6	2008	Peter Rosenmeier; Denmark	Daniel Arnold; Germany	Nico Blok; Netherlands
6	2012	Rungroj Thainiyom; Thailand	Alvaro Valera; Spain	Peter Rosenmeier; Denmark
6	2016	Peter Rosenmeier; Denmark	Alvaro Valera; Spain	Rungroj Thainiyom; Thailand
6	2020	Ian Seidenfeld; United States	Peter Rosenmeier; Denmark	Paul Karabardak; Great Britain; Rungroj Thainiyom; Thailand
7	1992	Zeev Glikman; Israel	Thomas Kurfess; Germany	Matheus Vossen; Netherlands; Jochen Wollmert; Germany
7	1996	Tahl Leibovitz; United States	Jochen Wollmert; Germany	Thomas Kurfess; Germany
7	2000	Jochen Wollmert; Germany	Zeev Glikman; Israel	Stéphane Messi; France
7	2004	Stéphane Messi; France	Jochen Wollmert; Germany	Jordi Morales; Spain
7	2008	Jochen Wollmert; Germany	Ye Chaoqun; China	Alvaro Valera; Spain
7	2012	Jochen Wollmert; Germany	Will Bayley; Great Britain	Mykhaylo Popov; Ukraine
7	2016	Will Bayley; Great Britain	Israel Pereira Stroh; Brazil	Yan Shuo; China
7	2020	Yan Shuo; China	Will Bayley; Great Britain	Maksym Chudzicki; Poland; Liao Keli; China
8	1992	Mitchell Seidenfeld; United States	Kenichi Suzuki; Japan	Werner Maissenbacher; Germany; Hiroshi Fujii; Japan
8	1996	Magnus Andree; Sweden	Mitchell Seidenfeld; United States	Vladimir Polkanov; Moldova; Kenichi Suzuki; Japan
8	2000	Alvaro Valera; Spain	Alain Pichon; France	Kimmo Jokinen; Finland
8	2004	Mathieu Loicq; Belgium	Marc Ledoux; Belgium	Richard Csejtey; Slovakia
8	2008	Chen Gang; China	Piotr Grudzien; Poland	Miroslav Jambor; Slovakia
8	2012	Zhao Shuai; China	Richard Csejtey; Slovakia	Emil Andersson; Sweden
8	2016	Zhao Shuai; China	András Csonka; Hungary	Piotr Grudzien; Poland
8	2020	Zhao Shuai; China	Viktor Didukh; Ukraine	Peng Weinan; China; Maksym Nikolenko; Ukraine
9	1992	Kimmo Jokinen; Finland	Manfred Knabe; Germany	Rein Zijda; Netherlands; Thierry Garofalo; France
9	1996	Stanisław Frączyk; Austria	Olivier Chateigner; France	Alain Pichon; France; Ladislav Gáspár; Slovakia
9	2000	Tajudeen Agunbiade; Nigeria	Stanisław Frączyk; Austria	Femi Alabi; Nigeria
9	2004	Stanisław Frączyk; Austria	Lu Xiaolei; China	Tahl Leibovitz; United States
9	2012	Ma Lin; China	Stanisław Frączyk; Austria	Gerben Last; Netherlands
9	2016	Laurens Devos; Belgium	Gerben Last; Netherlands	Mohamed Amine Kalem; Italy
9	2020	Laurens Devos; Belgium	Ma Lin; Australia	Ivan Mai; Ukraine; Iurii Nozdrunov; RPC
9-10	2008	Ge Yang; China	Ma Lin; China	Fredrik Andersson; Sweden
10	1992	Michael Gerke; Germany	Gilles de la Bourdonnaye; France	Thomas Goeller; Austria; Enrique Agudo; Spain
10	1996	Gilles de la Bourdonnaye; France	Robert Bader; Sweden	Enrique Agudo; Spain; Kwang Hoon-jung; South Korea
10	2000	Ivan Karabec; Czech Republic	Jose Manuel Ruiz; Spain	Fredrik Andersson; Sweden
10	2004	Ladislav Gáspár; Slovakia	Fredrik Andersson; Sweden	Ge Yang; China
10	2012	Patryk Chojnowski; Poland	Ge Yang; China	David Jacobs; Indonesia
10	2016	Ge Yang; China	Patryk Chojnowski; Poland	Krisztian Gardos; Austria
10	2020	Patryk Chojnowski; Poland	Matéo Bohéas; France	Filip Radović; Montenegro; David Jacobs; Indonesia
C	1976	Jörgen Augustsson; Sweden	Wong Shek Kau; Hong Kong	Tong Hon Keung; Hong Kong
C	1980	Manfred Knabe; West Germany	Ed Baas; Netherlands	H. J. Hoppe; West Germany
C1	1980	M. Stephens; United States	Salem Mohamed El Zeini; Egypt	Ahmed Mohamed Salama; Egypt
C1	1984	Terry Biggs; Australia	Allen Francis; Great Britain	None
C2	1984	Jorgen Anderson; Sweden	J. Leys; Belgium	D. Maebe; Belgium
C3	1984	Yaron Upshtein; Israel	Olle Hansen; Sweden	Rob Hartmans; Netherlands
C4	1984	R. Ferraud; France	Flemming Mortensen; Denmark	Paulo Jorge Santos; Portugal; Tommy Gilleras; Sweden
C5	1984	Thomas Axelsson; Sweden	Rob Visser; Netherlands	Roby Cusseneers; Belgium; Peter Kihlman; Sweden
C5	1988	Harold Kersten; Netherlands	Koji Inada; Japan	Eric Hollander; Belgium
C6	1988	Thomas Axelsson; Sweden	Mikael Westling; Sweden	Kim Kyung-sik; South Korea
D	1976	G. Chrak; Canada	P. Chassagne; France	Jozef de Vrieze; Belgium
D	1980	P. Kroll; West Germany	P. Chassagne; France	G. Chrak; Canada
D1	1976	M. Johnson; United States	D. Hoddleston; South Africa	J. Behan; United States
E	1976	Zoltán Tauber; Hungary	A. Pettersson; Sweden	B. Speedy; Great Britain
E	1980	Svetislav Dimitrijevic; Yugoslavia	Franc Simunic; Yugoslavia	H. Lieven; West Germany
F	1980	K. Kelzenberg; West Germany	E. Larsson; Sweden	L. Mauelshagen; West Germany
J	1980	G. Majer; West Germany	Tom Suters; Netherlands	Jacques Berings; Netherlands
L5	1984	Franc Simonic; Yugoslavia	Marcelino Monasterial; United States	Philippe Roine; France; P. Hullerum; West Germany
TT3	1988	Thomas Kurfess; West Germany	Rainer Schmidt; West Germany	Stephan Welting; West Germany
TT4	1988	David Hope; Great Britain	Marc Piras; France	Klaus Mueller; West Germany
TT5	1988	Kim Kwang-jin; South Korea	Thomas Schmitt; West Germany	Attila Szepesi; Hungary
TT6	1988	Kimmo Jokinen; Finland	Torben Pehrsson; Denmark	Jorgen Nilsson; Sweden
TT7	1988	Manfred Koller; West Germany	Svestislav Dimitrijevic; Yugoslavia	Frands Havaleschka; Denmark

== Intellectually impaired medalists ==
Class	Year	Gold	Silver	Bronze
11	2000	Piotr Skrobut; Poland	Tomasz Wojtas; Poland	Angel Garrido; Spain
11	2012	Péter Pálos; Hungary	Son Byeong-jun; South Korea	Pascal Pereira-Leal; France
11	2016	Florian Van Acker; Belgium	Samuel von Einem; Australia	Péter Pálos; Hungary
11	2020	Péter Pálos; Hungary	Samuel von Einem; Australia	Lucas Créange; France; Florian Van Acker; Belgium

== Open singles events ==
Class	Year	Gold	Silver	Bronze
Open 1A-4	1984	Thomas Kreidel; West Germany	Chang Choon-Bae; South Korea	P. Glaese; West Germany
Open 1A-4	1988	Michael Dempsey; United States	Guy Tisserant; France	Herbert Velroyen; West Germany
Open 1-5	1992	Guy Tisserant; France	Michael Dempsey; United States	Franz Mandl; Austria; Daniel Hatton; France
Open 1-5	1996	Thomas Kreidel; Germany	Dimitri Ghion; Belgium	Nasiru Sule; Nigeria; Bruno Benedetti; France
Open 6-10	1992	Kimmo Jokinen; Finland	Michael Gerke; Germany	Gilles de la Bourdonnaye; France; Enrique Agudo; Spain
Open 6-10	1996	Stanisław Frączyk; Austria	Ladislav Gáspár; Slovakia	Hsu Chih-shan; Chinese Taipei; Gilles de la Bourdonnaye; France
Open CL	1984	Kimmo Jokinen; Finland	Ed Baas; Netherlands	Z. Gajic; Yugoslavia
TT Open	1988	Claude Chedeau; France	Manfred Knabe; West Germany	Torben Pehrsson; Denmark

== See also ==
- List of Olympic medalists in table tennis
