= Table tennis at the 2016 Summer Paralympics – Men's individual – Class 11 =

Table tennis at the XV Paralympic Games
- Venue: Riocentro Pavilion 3
- Dates: 8–12 September 2016
- Competitors: 11 from 10 nations

Medalists
1st place, gold medalist(s)		Florian Van Acker	Belgium
2nd place, silver medalist(s)		Samuel von Einem	Australia
3rd place, bronze medalist(s)		Peter Palos	Hungary

The men's individual table tennis – Class 11 tournament at the 2016 Summer Paralympics in Rio de Janeiro took place during 8–12 September 2016 at Riocentro Pavilion 3. This class was for athletes with intellectual impairment.

In the preliminary stage, athletes competed in four groups. Winners and runners-up of each group qualified for the quarterfinals.

== Results ==
All times are local time in UTC-3.

=== Finals ===
==== Main bracket ====
Quarter-finals
A1	Florian Van Acker (BEL)	5	13	11	12
D2	Lucas Creange (FRA)	11	11	2	10
B2	Andrii Navrotskyi (UKR)	7	9	2
C1	Peter Palos (HUN)	11	11	11
D1	Samuel von Einem (AUS)	12	1	11	11	11
A2	Son Byeong-jun (KOR)	14	11	2	9	9
C2	Pascal Pereira Leal (FRA)	11	10	11	12
B1	Kim Gi-tae (KOR)	13	12	8	14

Semi-finals
A1	Florian Van Acker (BEL)	11	14	14
C1	Peter Palos (HUN)	6	12	12
D1	Samuel von Einem (AUS)	8	11	11	7	11
B1	Kim Gi-tae (KOR)	11	8	6	11	8

Finals
A1	Florian Van Acker (BEL)	11	16	11	11	11
D1	Samuel von Einem (AUS)	8	18	13	5	8

==== Bronze-medal match ====
Bronze-medal match
C1	Peter Palos (HUN)	11	13	11	9	11
B1	Kim Gi-tae (KOR)	5	11	13	11	9

=== Preliminary round ===
Qualified for the quarterfinals

==== Group A ====
Seed	Athlete	Won	Lost	Points diff	Rank
1	Florian Van Acker (BEL)	2	0	+18	1 Q
8	Son Byeong-jun (KOR)	0	1	-3	2 Q
10	Takeshi Takemori (JPN)	0	1	-15	

8 September, 17:40

Florian Van Acker (BEL)	11	11	10	11
Son Byeong-jun (KOR)	7	5	12	8

9 September, 15:00

Florian Van Acker (BEL)	11	9	14	11
Takeshi Takemori (JPN)	6	11	12	9

10 September, 12:00

Takeshi Takemori (JPN)	9	11	5	9
Son Byeong-jun (KOR)	11	9	11	11

==== Group B ====
Seed	Athlete	Won	Lost	Points diff	Rank
9	Kim Gi-tae (KOR)	1	1	+12	1Q
7	Andrii Navrotskyi (UKR)	1	1	+8	2Q
2	Eduardo Cuesta (ESP)	1	1	-18	

8 September, 17:40

Eduardo Cuesta (ESP)	3	4	7
Kim Gi-tae (KOR)	11	11	11

9 September, 15:00

Eduardo Cuesta (ESP)	11	4	7	11	11
Andrii Navrotskyi (UKR)	4	11	11	8	9

10 September, 12:00

Andrii Navrotskyi (UKR)	11	11	11	11
Kim Gi-tae (KOR)	8	9	13	7

==== Group C ====
Seed	Athlete	Won	Lost	Points diff	Rank
3	Peter Palos (HUN)	2	0	+21	1 Q
5	Pascal Pereira Leal (FRA)	1	1	+16	2 Q
11	Denisos Martínez (VEN)	0	2	-37	

8 September, 18:20

Peter Palos (HUN)	11	11	11
Denisos Martínez (VEN)	5	4	7

9 September, 15:00

Peter Palos (HUN)	11	6	11	16
Pascal Pereira Leal (FRA)	8	11	6	14

10 September, 12:00

Pascal Pereira Leal (FRA)	11	11	11
Denisos Martínez (VEN)	6	3	3

==== Group D ====
Seed	Athlete	Won	Lost	Points diff	Rank
6	Samuel von Einem (AUS)	1	0	+3	1 Q
4	Lucas Creange (FRA)	0	1	-3	2 Q

9 September, 15:00

Lucas Creange (FRA)	12	11	7	9
Samuel von Einem (AUS)	14	6	11	11
