= Athletics at the 1992 Summer Paralympics – Men's high jump J2 =

Men's high jump J2 at the IX Paralympic Games
- Paralympic Athletics
- Venue: Estadi Olímpic de Montjuïc
- Dates: September 1992
- Competitors: 7 from 7 nations

Medalists
1st place, gold medalist(s)		Ti Zhao	China
2nd place, silver medalist(s)		Alessandro Kuris	Italy
3rd place, bronze medalist(s)		Michael Hackett	Australia

The Men's high jump J2 was a field event in athletics at the 1992 Summer Paralympics, for visually impaired athletes.

== Results ==
=== Final ===
Place	Athlete	Time
1	Ti Zhao (CHN)	1.79
2	Alessandro Kuris (ITA)	1.79
3	Michael Hackett (AUS)	1.76
4	Madjid Ghayem (IRN)	1.73
-	Vincent Kimanzi (KEN)	DNS
-	Tomas Mattos (URU)	DNS
-	Michael Savage (USA)	DNS
