= Austria at the 1996 Summer Paralympics =

- IPC code: AUT
- NPC: Austrian Paralympic Committee
- Website: www.oepc.at (in German)

in Atlanta
- Competitors: 49 (44 men and 5 women)
- Medals Ranked 25th: Gold 6 Silver 6 Bronze 10 Total 22

Summer Paralympics appearances (overview)
- 1960; 1964; 1968; 1972; 1976; 1980; 1984; 1988; 1992; 1996; 2000; 2004; 2008; 2012; 2016; 2020; 2024

49 athletes (44 men and 5 women) from Austria competed at the 1996 Summer Paralympics in Atlanta, United States.

== Medallists ==
| Medal | Name | Sport | Event |
|---|---|---|---|
| Gold | Andrea Scherney | Athletics | Women's javelin F42-44/46 |
| Gold | Wolfgang Eibeck | Cycling | Mixed omnium LC1 |
| Gold | Walter Hanl | Judo | Men's +95kg |
| Gold | Stanislaw Fraczyk | Table tennis | Men's open 6-10 |
| Gold | Stanislaw Fraczyk | Table tennis | Men's singles 9 |
| Gold | Susanne Schwendtner | Table tennis | Women's singles 5 |
| Silver | Sven Reiger; Andreas Kramer; Manfred Hartl; Klaus Felser | Athletics | Men's 4 × 100 m relay T42-46 |
| Silver | Karl Mayr | Athletics | Men's shot put F11 |
| Silver | Hubert Aufschnaiter | Shooting | Men's air pistol SH1 |
| Silver | Rudolf Hajek; Gerhard Scharf | Table tennis | Men's team 1-2 |
| Silver | Peter Starl; Fritz Altendorfer; Manfred Dollmann | Table tennis | Men's team 3 |
| Silver | Stanislaw Fraczyk; Thomas Goeller | Table tennis | Men's team 9-10 |
| Bronze | Klaus Felser | Athletics | Men's 100m T45-46 |
| Bronze | Andreas Siegl | Athletics | Men's long jump F42 |
| Bronze | Wolfgang Dubin | Athletics | Men's shot put F35 |
| Bronze | Norbett Zettler | Cycling | Mixed 45/55k bicycle LC3 |
| Bronze | Norbett Zettler | Cycling | Mixed omnium LC3 |
| Bronze | Gerhard Scharf | Table tennis | Men's singles 2 |
| Bronze | Fritz Altendorfer | Table tennis | Men's singles 3 |
| Bronze | Christian Sutter | Table tennis | Men's singles 4 |
| Bronze | Christian Sutter; Franz Mandl | Table tennis | Men's team 4-5 |
| Bronze | Susanne Schwendtner | Table tennis | Women's open 1-5 |

== See also ==
- Austria at the Paralympics
- Austria at the 1996 Summer Olympics
