= Maria Nardelli =

Italian para table tennis player

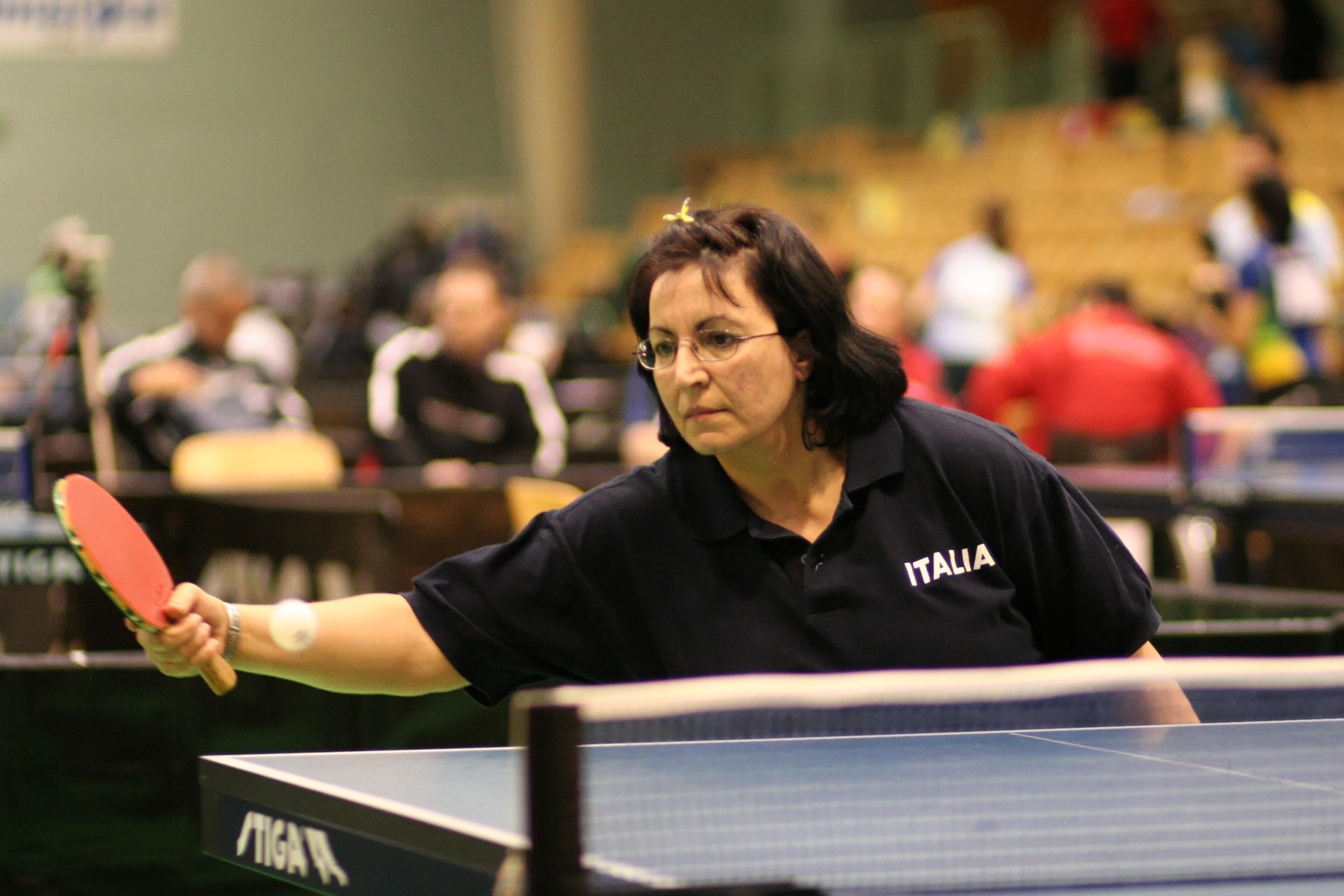

Personal information
- Nationality: Italian
- Born: 9 May 1954 (age 72) Taranto, Italy

Sport
- Country: Italy
- Sport: Para table tennis
- Club: Polisportiva Handicappati Firenze
- Coached by: Alessandro Arcigli
Medal record
Women's para table tennis
Representing Italy
Paralympic Games
Silver medal – second place	1992 Barcelona	Individual open 1–5
Bronze medal – third place	1992 Barcelona	Team class 5
Bronze medal – third place	1996 Atlanta	Individual class 5
World Championships
Bronze medal – third place	1990 Assen	Individual open 3
Bronze medal – third place	1994 Stoke Mandeville	Team class 3

Maria Nardelli (born 9 May 1954 in Taranto) is an Italian para table tennis player who has won three medals at the Summer Paralympics.

== Biography ==
She is disabled for the effect of polio. In November 2011, in Scandicci, she was awarded the "Notte del Pallone rosa - Premio Maria Nisticò" (4th Edition).

== See also ==
- Italy at the 2012 Summer Paralympics
