= Schwendtner =

Schwendtner is a surname. Notable people with this surname include:

- Jozef Schwendtner (born 1963), Slovak wrestler
- Susanne Schwendtner, Austrian para table tennis player
