= Yang Yi =

Yang Yi may refer to:

- Yang Yi (Shu Han) (died 235), official of Shu Han
- Yang Yi (translator) (1919–2023), Chinese literary translator
- Yang Yi (table tennis) (born 1952), Chinese para table tennis player
- Yang Yi (author) (born 1964), Chinese-born Japanese writer
- Tavia Yeung (楊怡; Yáng Yí, born 1979), Hong Kong actress
- Yang Yi (military officer) (born 1966), People's Liberation Army lieutenant general
