= Michael Hackett =

Michael Hackett may refer to:

- Michael Hackett (athlete), Australian Paralympic athlete
- Michael Hackett (basketball) (born 1960), American professional basketball player.
- Michael Felix Hackett (1851–1926), Quebec lawyer, judge and political figure
