= Table tennis at the Summer Paralympics =

- Governing body: ITTF
- Events: 29 (men: 16; women: 13)

Games
- 1960; 1964; 1968; 1972; 1976; 1980; 1984; 1988; 1992; 1996; 2000; 2004; 2008; 2012; 2016; 2020; 2024
- Medalists

Paralympic table tennis has been competed at every Summer Paralympic Games since they were first held in 1960. Men and women compete in singles and team events in ten different classes according to the extent of their disability. Table tennis made its debut at the Summer Olympic Games in 1988.

== Summary ==
Games	Year	Events	Best nation
1	1960	11	Italy
2	1964	12	Great Britain
3	1968	15	Israel
4	1972	19	West Germany
5	1976	27	Switzerland
6	1980	32	West Germany
7	1984	36	West Germany
8	1988	38	West Germany
9	1992	36	Germany
10	1996	28	France
11	2000	30	France
12	2004	28	China
13	2008	24	China
14	2012	29	China
15	2016	29	China
16	2020	31	China
17	2024	31	China

== Overall medal summary ==
Table of medals won by nations, updated after the 2024 Summer Paralympics.

Rank	Nation	Gold	Silver	Bronze	Total
1	China (CHN)	86	36	26	148
2	West Germany (FRG)	43	27	28	98
3	France (FRA)	30	43	55	128
4	South Korea (KOR)	29	38	45	112
5	Great Britain (GBR)	26	33	50	109
6	Germany (GER)	25	30	27	82
7	Austria (AUT)	25	21	24	70
8	Netherlands (NED)	20	13	24	57
9	Switzerland (SUI)	15	7	10	32
10	Poland (POL)	14	11	12	37
11	United States (USA)	12	13	21	46
12	Sweden (SWE)	11	25	21	57
13	Belgium (BEL)	11	7	13	31
14	Israel (ISR)	9	4	10	23
15	Italy (ITA)	7	12	21	40
16	Slovakia (SVK)	7	8	9	24
17	Finland (FIN)	7	6	8	21
18	Australia (AUS)	6	7	6	19
19	Denmark (DEN)	6	5	9	20
20	Hong Kong (HKG)	5	9	11	25
21	Czech Republic (CZE)	4	9	5	18
22	Japan (JPN)	4	5	10	19
23	Ukraine (UKR)	4	4	10	18
24	Yugoslavia (YUG)	4	3	3	10
25	Hungary (HUN)	4	2	9	15
26	Norway (NOR)	3	8	11	22
27	Ireland (IRL)	3	5	8	16
28	Turkey (TUR)	2	4	8	14
29	Russia (RUS)	2	2	2	6
30	Croatia (CRO)	2	1	1	4
31	Nigeria (NGR)	2	0	4	6
32	Spain (ESP)	1	6	13	20
33	Serbia (SRB)	1	6	4	11
34	Thailand (THA)	1	4	9	14
35	RPC (RPC)	1	2	4	7
36	Canada (CAN)	1	1	6	8
37	Jordan (JOR)	1	0	3	4
38	Slovenia (SLO)	1	0	1	2
39	Cuba (CUB)	1	0	0	1
39	Iraq (IRQ)	1	0	0	1
39	Mixed-NOCs (MIX)	1	0	0	1
39	Peru (PER)	1	0	0	1
43	Chinese Taipei (TPE)	0	7	8	15
44	Brazil (BRA)	0	3	9	12
45	Argentina (ARG)	0	2	1	3
46	Mexico (MEX)	0	2	0	2
47	Egypt (EGY)	0	1	2	3
48	Neutral Paralympic Athletes (NPA)	0	1	1	2
48	South Africa (RSA)	0	1	1	2
48	Zimbabwe (ZIM)	0	1	1	2
51	India (IND)	0	1	0	1
51	Malta (MLT)	0	1	0	1
53	Indonesia (INA)	0	0	2	2
53	Montenegro (MNE)	0	0	2	2
55	Chile (CHI)	0	0	1	1
55	Iceland (ISL)	0	0	1	1
55	Moldova (MDA)	0	0	1	1
55	Philippines (PHI)	0	0	1	1
55	Portugal (POR)	0	0	1	1
55	Romania (ROU)	0	0	1	1
55	Serbia and Montenegro (SCG)	0	0	1	1
Totals (61 entries)		439	437	575	1,451

== Multi-medalists ==
Table tennis players who have won two gold medals or five medals. Active players are in bold.

No.	Athlete	Country	Years	Games	Gender	Gold	Silver	Bronze	Total
1	Zhang Xiaoling	China (CHN)	1988-2008	7	F	9	1	2	12
2	Tommy Taylor	Great Britain (GBR)	1960-1980	6	M	8	0	1	9
3	Jochen Wollmert	Germany (GER)	1992-2012	6	M	5	2	3	10
4	**Natalia Partyka**	Poland (POL)	2004-2016	4	F	5	1	1	7
5	Baruch Hagai	Israel (ISR)	1964-1976	4	M	5	0	1	6
5	Irene Schmidt	Netherlands (NED)	1972-1980	3	F	5	0	1	6
7	Ján Riapoš	Slovakia (SVK)	2004-2012	3	M	4	1	0	5
8	Michael Dempsey	United States (USA)	1972-2000	8	M	3	4	3	10
9	Rainer Küschall	Switzerland (SUI)	1972-1984	4	M	3	1	2	6
10	**Kelly van Zon**	Netherlands (NED)	2008-2020	4	F	3	1	1	3
11	Christophe Durand	France (FRA)	1996-2008	4	M	2	1	3	6
12	James Rawson	Great Britain (GBR)	1992-2008	5	M	2	1	2	5
13	Gerda Becker	Netherlands (NED)	1976-1980	2	F	2	1	1	4
13	Mati Angel	Israel (ISR)	1960-1980	4	F	2	1	1	4
13	Holger Nikelis	Germany (GER)	2004-2012	3	M	2	1	1	4
16	Carol Bryant	Great Britain (GBR)	1968-1972	2	F	2	1	0	3
17	**Peter Rosenmeier**	Denmark (DEN)	2004-2016	4	M	2	0	2	4
18	Neil Robinson	Great Britain (GBR)	1992-2008	5	M	1	4	1	6
19	**Thu Kamkasomphou**	France (FRA)	2000-2024	7	F	2	2	5	9
20	Zlatko Kesler	Yugoslavia (YUG); Serbia (SRB)	1992-2012	6	M	1	2	2	5
21	**José Manuel Ruiz Reyes**	Spain (ESP)	2000-2016	5	M	0	3	2	5

== Nations ==
Nation	60	64	68	72	76	80	84	88	92	96	00	04	08	12	16	20	Total
Argentina (ARG)		3	9	2	8	4		5	6	8	5	3	2	4	4		13
Australia (AUS)	2	4	17	2	7	6	1	9	1		2		2	2	5		13
Austria (AUT)	6	4	21	12	14	10	4	9	9		8	7	8	6	4		14
Bahamas (BAH)					3												1
Bahrain (BRN)								2									1
Belgium (BEL)	1	1	8	3	9	9	4	6	9	9	5	5	3	3	4		15
Brazil (BRA)					5			3	1	4	5	5	11	14	17		9
Bulgaria (BUL)															1		1
Canada (CAN)			16	4	19	10	1	1			2		1		1		9
Chile (CHI)												1		1	2		3
China (CHN)							1	12	2	2	8	13	26	28	30		9
Chinese Taipei (TPE)									2	3	12	8	8	5	4		7
Colombia (COL)					8	2											2
Costa Rica (CRC)													2				1
Croatia (CRO)											4	4	2	4	4		5
Cuba (CUB)												2	4				2
Czech Republic (CZE)										9	14	13	6	6	3		6
Czechoslovakia (TCH)						1											1
Denmark (DEN)			5	1	6	9	2	7	9	5	3	2	3	1	3		13
Egypt (EGY)					6	4		1				3	4	8	7		7
Ethiopia (ETH)			2		1												2
Faroe Islands (FRO)									1								1
Fiji (FIJ)															1		1
Finland (FIN)				1	4	4	4	5	6	5	3	2	1	1	1		12
France (FRA)			13	8	6	11	10	14	17	21	29	29	26	28	16		13
Germany (GER)	1	3							32	27	20	18	12	12	11		9
Great Britain (GBR)	10	12	25	18	19	15	9	17	13	10	14	8	11	13	13		15
Greece (GRE)					2	3						3					3
Guatemala (GUA)					2												1
Hong Kong (HKG)					3	5	1	11	6	5	7	2	4	5	3		11
Hungary (HUN)					1		3	7	7	6	3	5	3	3	6		10
Iceland (ISL)						3	1	1	2			1					5
India (IND)			2														1
Independent Paralympic Participants (IPP)									3								1
Indonesia (INA)					3	6		3						1	1		5
Iran (IRI)									4			3	2	1			4
Iraq (IRQ)									2					1			2
Ireland (IRL)			5	2	10	8	2	7	8	4	4		2	4	1		12
Israel (ISR)	1	6	18	4	6	5	1	4	6	4	1	2	4	2	4		15
Italy (ITA)	9	4	15	4	9	16		8	7	4	7	5	13	10	7		14
Jamaica (JAM)			5	2		2		1			1						5
Japan (JPN)		6	5	1	6	6		12	6	5	12	8	2	3	5		13
Jordan (JOR)								2			2	4	3	3	3		6
Kenya (KEN)						2		1									2
Kuwait (KUW)								3									1
Libya (LBA)													2				1
Liechtenstein (LIE)								1	3			1					3
Luxembourg (LUX)						4											1
Malaysia (MAS)														2	1	1	3
Malta (MLT)	1		3														2
Mexico (MEX)					4	14			1	3	6	5	2	1	2		9
Moldova (MDA)										1							1
Netherlands (NED)	2	2	14	6	10	19	5	9	14	7	4	5	4	4	4		15
New Zealand (NZL)			7		4												2
Nigeria (NGR)									3	2	7		5	2	3		6
Norway (NOR)	1		14	5	16	13	3	3	2		2	2	2	3	2		13
Oman (OMA)								2									1
Peru (PER)					1												1
Philippines (PHI)														1	1		2
Poland (POL)										2	12	9	10	12	13		6
Portugal (POR)							1				1						2
Puerto Rico (PUR)								3	2								2
Rhodesia (RHO)			6														1
Romania (ROU)				1										1	2		3
Russia (RUS)										1	1	4	9	9			5
Serbia (SRB)													4	3	4		3
Serbia and Montenegro (SCG)												2					1
Sierra Leone (SLE)															1		1
Slovakia (SVK)										5	7	10	10	8	7		6
Slovenia (SLO)											2	2	5	2			4
South Africa (RSA)			3		9				1		6	5	4				6
South Korea (KOR)			2	5	5	10	1	37	14	12	15	13	14	23	22		13
Spain (ESP)			2					4	15	5	8	7	5	6	9		9
Sudan (SUD)						2											1
Sweden (SWE)			10	1	13	17	10	15	15	14	10	8	9	8	6		13
Switzerland (SUI)			11	10	13	15	5	7	6	3	4	3		1	1		12
Syria (SYR)									1								1
Tanzania (TAN)									1								1
Thailand (THA)								3					2	4	7		4
Trinidad and Tobago (TTO)								1									1
Turkey (TUR)												1	1	6	9		4
Ukraine (UKR)											4	2	6	7	10		5
Unified Team (EUN)									3								1
United States (USA)		6	26	5	13	10	4	20	21	12	9	3	4	3	2		14
West Germany (FRG)			16	16	17	21	24	33									6
Venezuela (VEN)									3			1	1	1	2		5
Yemen (YEM)									1								1
Yugoslavia (YUG)						2	4	5		2	1						5
Zimbabwe (ZIM)						2											1
Nations	10	11	27	27	29	33	23	38	40	31	40	43	45	47	47		
Competitors	35	51	279	112	265	270	101	294	265	210	270	239	264	276	269		
Year	60	64	68	72	76	80	84	88	92	96	00	04	08	12	16	20	

== See also ==
- World Para Table Tennis Championships
- European Para Table Tennis Championships
- Table tennis at the Summer Olympics
