= Marcelino Monasterial =

American para table tennis player

Personal information
- Nationality: Filipino
- Born: 3 January 1923 Manila, Philippines
- Died: 27 January 1997 (aged 74) Alameda, California United States

Sport
- Country: United States
- Sport: Para table tennis
Medal record
Para table tennis
Representing United States
Paralympic Games
Silver medal – second place	1984 Stoke Mandeville/New York	Men's singles L5
Bronze medal – third place	1992 Barcelona	Men's singles

Marcelino "Marcy" Monasterial (January 3, 1923 - January 27, 1997) was an American para table tennis player of Filipino descent.

== Sporting career ==
=== Beginning ===
Monasterial started his sporting career at the age of six and began to play competitively in 1934 aged eleven. He was a dominant right-handed player with an overpowering forehand drive, he also won his first national junior championship title aged in 1944 and remained unbeaten for a long time.

=== Injury at war ===
Monasterial served as First Lieutenant during the Second World War and was fired upon by Japanese troops and a round struck his right arm, this led to his arm being amputated below the elbow. He returned to table tennis three weeks later but had to learn how to play left-handedly following the loss of his right arm.

=== Returning to the sport ===
In 1945, Monasterial went to Columbia University to study for a BA and an MA. He then went onto compete for the New York State in 1956 at the U.S. Team Championships, one year later, he went to the 1957 World Table Tennis Championships in Sweden. Monasterial volunteered to play with disabled people at a rehabilitation center in White Plains, New York.

He was selected to compete at the 1984 Summer Paralympics and won his first Paralympic silver medal in the singles, he competed in the 1988 Summer Paralympics but didn't medal, he then went to his third Games, he went to Barcelona to compete at the 1992 Summer Paralympics where he won the bronze medal at the age of 69.
