= Rosa Zaugg =

Swiss retired para table tennis player

Personal information
- Born: 1956 (age 69–70) Steffisburg, Switzerland

Sport
- Sport: Para table tennis
- Disability: Paraplegia
Medal record
Representing Switzerland
Paralympic athletics
Paralympic Games
Bronze medal – third place	1980 Arnhem	Slalom 5
Bronze medal – third place	1984 Stoke Mandeville/New York	Slalom 5
Para table tennis
Paralympic Games
Gold medal – first place	1984 Stoke Mandeville/New York	Teams C4
Silver medal – second place	1992 Barcelona	Singles C5
World Championships
Silver medal – second place	1990 Assen	Singles C5
Bronze medal – third place	1990 Assen	Teams C4-5
European Championships
Bronze medal – third place	1991 Salou	Teams C5

Rosa Zaugg (born 1956) is a Swiss retired para table tennis player and former Paralympic athlete. She has competed at the Paralympic Games four times and winning five medals cross two sports.

In 1975, Zaugg fell off scaffolding while working as an apprentice painter. She was awarded Swiss Paraplegic of the Year in 2016.
