= Gerda Becker =

Dutch table tennis player (born 1956/7)

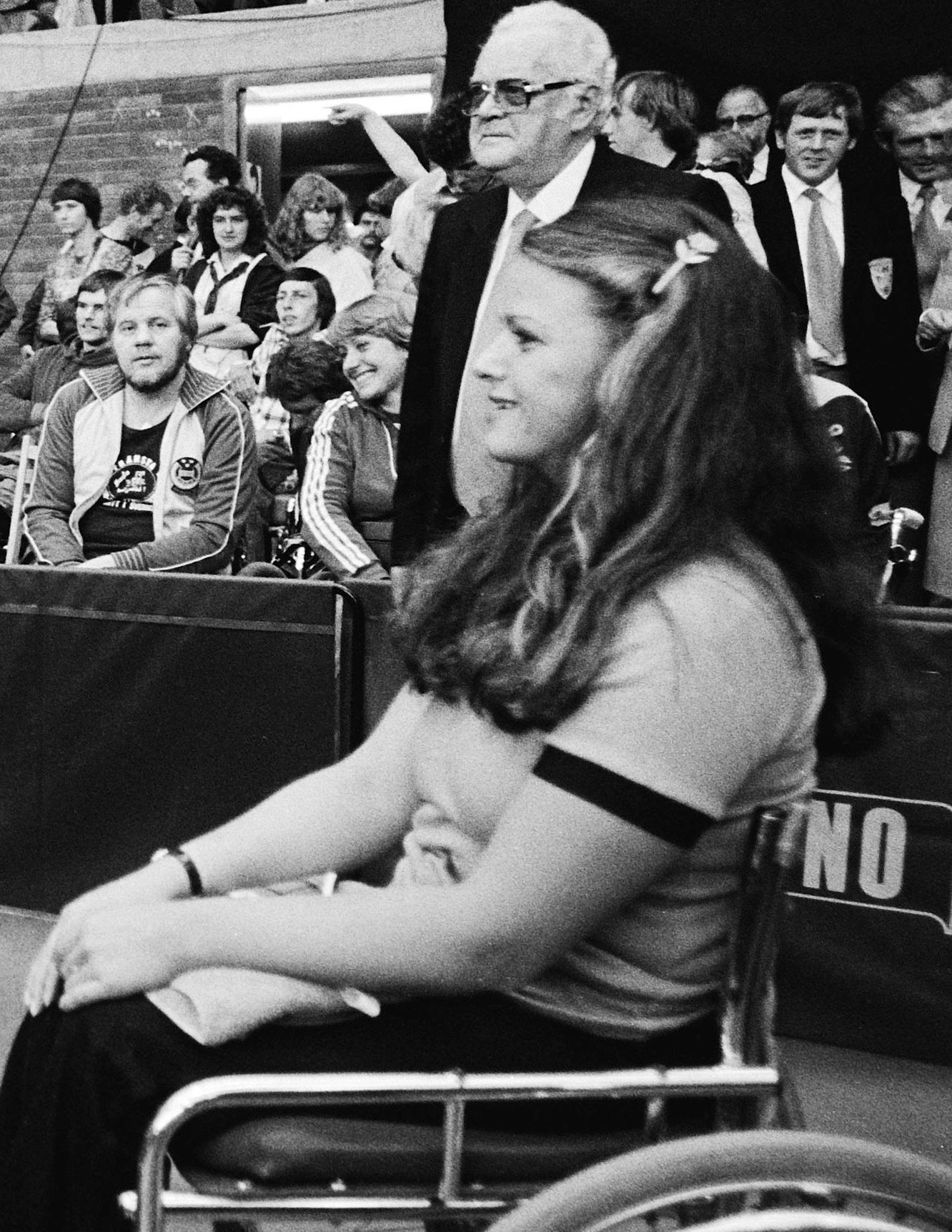
- Gerda Becker in 1980

Sport
- Sport: Table tennis
Medal record
Table tennis
Representing the Netherlands
Paralympic Games
Gold medal – first place	1976 Toronto	Teams 4–5
Gold medal – first place	1980 Arnhem	Teams 4
Silver medal – second place	1976 Toronto	Singles 4–5
Bronze medal – third place	1980 Arnhem	Singles 4

Gerda Becker (born 1956 or 1957) is a retired Dutch table tennis player from Rotterdam. She competed at the 1976 and 1980 Summer Paralympics in the individual and team events and won two gold, one silver and one bronze medal.
