= List of Paralympic medalists in table tennis =

Table tennis was one of the first sports to be featured in the 1960 Summer Paralympics and is still contested today in the Summer Paralympics. Para table tennis is the third biggest Paralympic sport behind swimming and athletics.

== Medalists ==
=== Defunct events ===
- List of Paralympic medalists in table tennis (doubles' events) (1960 - 1976)

=== Current events ===
- List of Paralympic medalists in table tennis (men's singles) (1960–present)
- List of Paralympic medalists in table tennis (women's singles) (1960–present)
- List of Paralympic medalists in table tennis (men's teams) (1972–present)
- List of Paralympic medalists in table tennis (women's teams) (1972–present)

== See also ==
- List of Olympic medalists in table tennis
