= China at the 1992 Summer Paralympics =

- IPC code: CHN
- NPC: China Administration of Sports for Persons with Disabilities
- Website: www.caspd.org.cn

in Barcelona
- Competitors: 24
- Medals Ranked 10th: Gold 16 Silver 8 Bronze 7 Total 31

Summer Paralympics appearances (overview)
- 1984; 1988; 1992; 1996; 2000; 2004; 2008; 2012; 2016; 2020; 2024

China competed at the 1992 Summer Paralympics held in Barcelona, Spain.

== Medalists ==
Medal	Name	Sport	Event
Gold	Zhao Ti	Athletics	Men's high jump J2
Gold	Zhao Xue	Athletics	Men's high jump J4
Gold	Huang Wentao	Athletics	Men's long jump B2
Gold	Yang Shao	Athletics	Men's triple jump J3-4
Gold	Chang Ting Sun	Athletics	Men's javelin throw THS3
Gold	Zhen Yu Yao	Athletics	Men's shot put THS3
Gold	Liu Yukun	Athletics	Women's discus throw THS2
Gold	Zheng Pei	Athletics	Women's shot put B1
Gold	Zhou Xiangrong	Swimming	Women's 100m backstroke S6
Gold	Zhang Xiaoling	Table tennis	Women's singles 9
Gold	Zhang Xiaoling; Yang Yi	Table tennis	Women's team 10
Silver	Wu Yanjian	Athletics	Men's 5000m TS4
Silver	Yang Shao	Athletics	Men's high jump J4
Silver	Qiu Lin	Athletics	Men's triple jump J3-4
Silver	Zhao Jihong	Athletics	Women's long jump B3
Silver	Liu Zebing	Swimming	Men's 100m butterfly S8
Silver	Zhang Xiaoling	Table tennis	Women's open 6-10
Silver	Yang Yi	Table tennis	Women's singles 9
Bronze	Wu Yanjian	Athletics	Men's 1500m TS4
Bronze	Huang Wentao	Athletics	Men's triple jump B2
Bronze	Zheng Pei	Athletics	Women's discus throw B1
Bronze	Shi Tieyin	Swimming	Women's 100m breaststroke SB8
Bronze	Zhou Xue	Swimming	Women's 100m butterfly B1
Bronze	Zhou Xiangrong	Swimming	Women's 200m freestyle S6
Bronze	Yang Yi	Table tennis	Women's open 6-10

== See also ==
- China at the Paralympics
- China at the 1992 Summer Olympics
- Sports in China
