= Leslie Lam (table tennis) =

Personal information
- Born: British Hong Kong

Sport
- Sport: Table tennis
Medal record
Men's para table tennis
Representing Hong Kong
Paralympic Games
Silver medal – second place	1972 Heidelberg	Singles 2
Bronze medal – third place	1972 Heidelberg	Teams 3
Representing Canada
Paralympic Games
Silver medal – second place	1976 Toronto	Singles 2
Bronze medal – third place	1976 Toronto	Teams 3

Leslie Lam
- Traditional Chinese: 林龍
- Simplified Chinese: 林龙
Transcriptions
Standard Mandarin
- Hanyu Pinyin: Lín Lóng
Yue: Cantonese
- Jyutping: Lam^{4} Lung^{4}

Leslie "Les" Lam (Chinese: 林龍; Jyutping: Lam^{4} Lung^{4}) is a Hong Kong-Canadian former Paralympian who won para table tennis medals, first at the 1972 Summer Paralympics representing Hong Kong and, four years later, at the 1976 Summer Paralympics representing Canada. He also competed in athletics, wheelchair basketball, and swimming in Paralympic Games from 1972 to 1984.

He began using a wheelchair following a spinal cord injury at age 8. He graduated from the University of Toronto and worked as a pharmacist in the Greater Toronto Area. In 1999 he was inducted into the Canadian Disability Hall of Fame.
