= Table tennis at the 2012 Summer Paralympics – Men's individual – Class 11 =

Table tennis Men's C11 at the XIV Paralympic Games
- Venue: ExCeL Exhibition Centre
- Dates: 30 August – 3 September 2012
- Competitors: 6 from 6 nations

Medalists
1st place, gold medalist(s)		Peter Palos	Hungary
2nd place, silver medalist(s)		Son Byeongjun	South Korea
3rd place, bronze medalist(s)		Pascal Pereira-Leal	France

The Men's individual table tennis – Class 11 tournament at the 2012 Summer Paralympics in London tookplace from 30 August to 3 September 2012 at ExCeL Exhibition Centre. This class was for athletes with intellectual impairment.

In the preliminary stage, athletes competed in two groups of three. Top two in each group qualified for the semi-finals.

== Results ==
All times are local (BST/UTC+1)

=== Finals ===
Semifinals: 1 Sep 18:15
A1	Pascal Pereira-Leal (FRA)	12	7	7	4
B2	Peter Palos (HUN)	10	11	11	11
A2	Pawel Olejarski (POL)	11	5	7	10
B1	Son Byeongjun (KOR)	9	11	11	12

Gold-medal match: 3 Sep 09:30
B2	Peter Palos (HUN)	12	9	11	11
B1	Son Byeongjun (KOR)	10	11	9	9
Bronze-medal match
A1	Pascal Pereira-Leal (FRA)	15	11	11
A2	Pawel Olejarski (POL)	13	4	6

=== Preliminary round ===
Qualified for the semifinals

==== Group A ====
Athlete	Won	Lost	Points diff
Pascal Pereira-Leal (FRA)	2	0	+24
Pawel Olejarski (POL)	1	1	0
Lucas Maciel (BRA)	0	2	-24

30 August, 13:00

Lucas Maciel (BRA)	7	11	6
Pascal Pereira-Leal (FRA)	11	13	11

31 August, 11:00

Pawel Olejarski (POL)	11	4	7
Pascal Pereira-Leal (FRA)	13	11	11

31 August, 20:40

Pawel Olejarski (POL)	11	11	11
Lucas Maciel (BRA)	5	8	7

==== Group B ====
Athlete	Won	Lost	Points diff
Son Byeongjun (KOR)	2	0	+10
Peter Palos (HUN)	1	1	+14
Yuki Kinoshita (JPN)	0	2	-24

30 August, 13:00

Yuki Kinoshita (JPN)	6	8	5
Peter Palos (HUN)	11	11	11

31 August, 11:00

Son Byeongjun (KOR)	13	5	15	12
Peter Palos (HUN)	11	11	13	10

31 August, 20:40

Son Byeongjun (KOR)	11	11	11
Yuki Kinoshita (JPN)	5	9	9
