= Jacqueline Blanc =

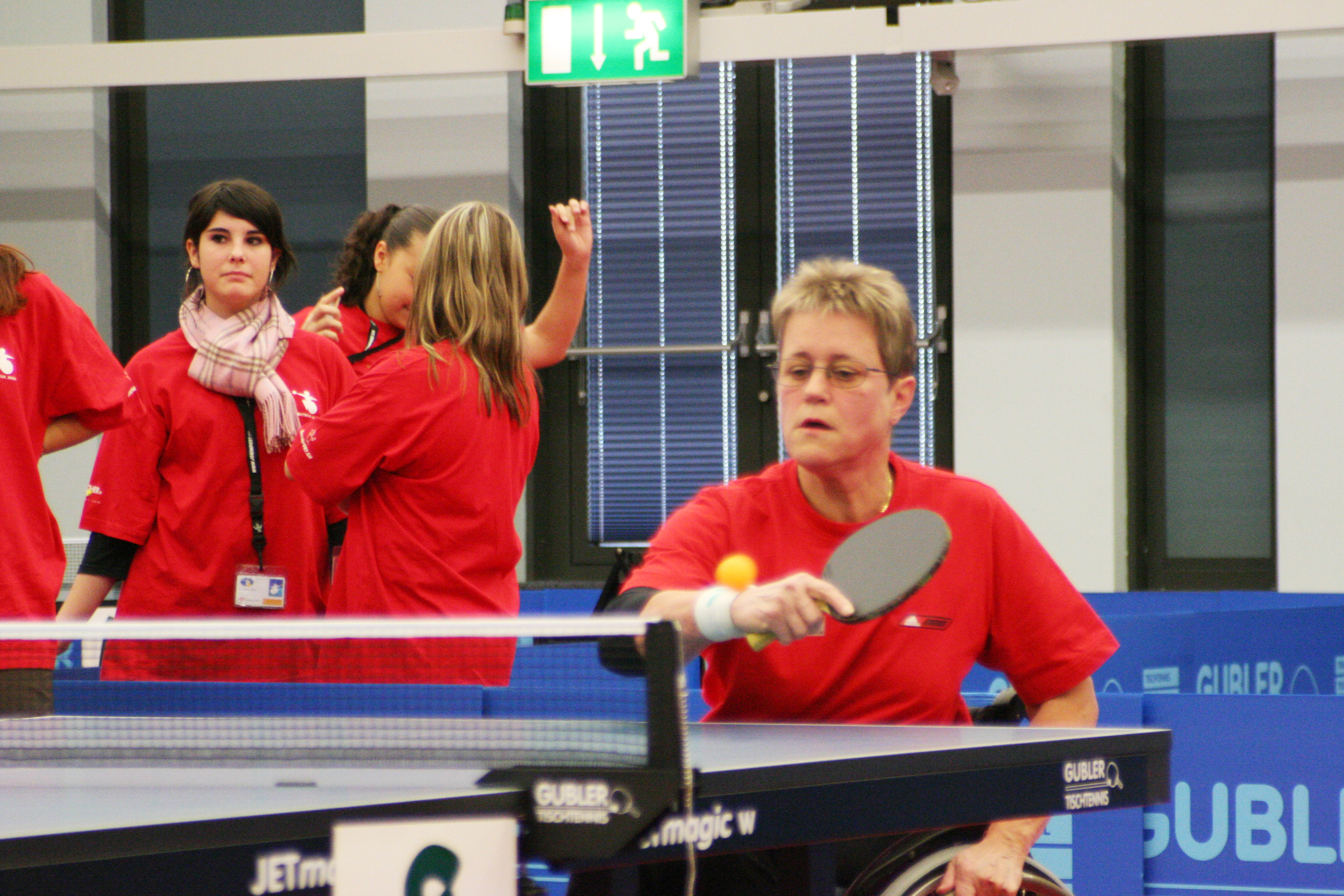
- Blanc in 2005

Personal information
- Born: 4 July 1950 (age 75) Villaz-Saint-Pierre, Switzerland

Sport
- Sport: Para table tennis
Medal record
Representing Switzerland
Paralympic Games
| Gold medal – first place | 1984 Stoke Mandeville/New York | Teams C4 |
World Championships
| Bronze medal – third place | 1990 Assen | Teams C4-5 |
| Bronze medal – third place | 1998 Paris | Singles C4 |
European Championships
| Silver medal – second place | 1995 Hillerød | Teams C3-4 |
| Bronze medal – third place | 1991 Salou | Teams C5 |

Jacqueline Blanc (born 4 July 1950) is a Swiss retired para table tennis player who competed at international table tennis competitions. She has competed at the Paralympics seven times.
