= Manuel Robles (table tennis) =

Spanish para table tennis player

Personal information
- Full name: Manuel Robles Aguila
- Born: 6 March 1959 (age 67) Monachil, Granada, Spain

Sport
- Country: Spain
- Sport: Para table tennis (class 5)
Medal record
Table tennis
Representing Spain
Paralympic Games
Bronze medal – third place	1992 Barcelona	Class 5 singles
Bronze medal – third place	2000 Sydney	Open 1–5 singles

Manuel Robles Aguila (Note: In this Spanish name, the first or paternal surname is Robles and the second or maternal family name is Aguila.) (born 6 March 1959 in Monachil, Granada) is a class 5 para table tennis player from Spain. He played at the 1992, 1996, 2000 and 2004 Summer Paralympics. In 2000, he finished third in the open 1–5 singles table tennis event.
