= James Munkley =

Welsh para table tennis player

Personal information
- Nationality: Welsh
- Born: 8 January 1949
- Died: 3 October 2017 (aged 68)

Sport
- Country: United Kingdom
- Sport: Para table tennis
- Disability class: C2
- Retired: 2008
Medal record
Para table tennis
Representing United Kingdom
Paralympic Games
Bronze medal – third place	1984 Stoke Mandeville/New York	Men's team 1B
European Championships
Bronze medal – third place	1991 Salou	Men's teams C2

James "Jim" Munkley MBE (8 January 1949 – 3 October 2017) was a former Welsh para table tennis player. He participated in five Summer Paralympic Games.

After his retirement from sport in 2008, Munkley became a voluntary coach and trained Claire Robertson for the 2008 Summer Paralympics.
