= Table tennis at the 1984 Summer Paralympics =

Table tennis at the VII Paralympic Games
- Paralympic Table tennis

Paralympic symbol (1988–1994)

Table tennis at the 1984 Summer Paralympics consisted of 39 events, 24 for men and 15 for women.

== Medal table ==
Rank	Nation	Gold	Silver	Bronze	Total
1	West Germany (FRG)	14	4	8	26
2	France (FRA)	4	5	1	10
3	Sweden (SWE)	4	3	1	8
4	Great Britain (GBR)	3	5	5	13
5	Austria (AUT)	3	4	2	9
6	Finland (FIN)	2	1	2	5
7	Denmark (DEN)	2	1	0	3
8	Switzerland (SUI)	2	0	2	4
9	Netherlands (NED)	1	3	2	6
10	Belgium (BEL)	1	1	4	6
11	Yugoslavia (YUG)	1	0	3	4
12	Australia (AUS)	1	0	0	1
12	Israel (ISR)	1	0	0	1
14	United States (USA)	0	4	2	6
15	Hong Kong (HKG)	0	3	1	4
16	Norway (NOR)	0	2	1	3
17	Ireland (IRL)	0	1	2	3
18	South Korea (KOR)	0	1	1	2
19	China (CHN)	0	1	0	1
20	Canada (CAN)	0	0	1	1
20	Iceland (ISL)	0	0	1	1
20	Portugal (POR)	0	0	1	1
Totals (22 entries)		39	39	40	118

== Medal summary ==
=== Men's events ===
Event	Gold	Silver	Bronze
Open 1A-4	Thomas Kreidel; West Germany	Choon Bae Chang; South Korea	P. Glaese; West Germany
Open CL	Kimmo Jokinen; Finland	Ed Baas; Netherlands	Z. Gajic; Yugoslavia
Singles 1A	Ralf Kirchhoff; West Germany	H. Tietze; West Germany	Matti Launonen; Finland
Singles 1B	Bruno Hassler; West Germany	Tony Edge; Great Britain	Kauko Kajaste; Finland
Singles 1C	Manfred Emmel; West Germany	Daniel Jeannin; France	Rudolf Jaksch; West Germany
Singles 2	Werner Dorr; West Germany	Franz Mandl; Austria	Fritz Altendorfer; Austria
Singles 3	Heinz Simon; West Germany	Rainer Kolb; West Germany	Peter Starl; Austria
Singles 4	Thomas Kreidel; West Germany	P. Glaese; West Germany	Michael Dempsey; United States
Singles C1	Terry Biggs; Australia	Allen Francis; Great Britain	None
Singles C2	Jorgen Anderson; Sweden	J. Leys; Belgium	D. Maebe; Belgium
Singles C3	Yaron Upshtein; Israel	Olle Hansen; Sweden	Rob Hartmans; Netherlands
Singles C4	R. Ferraud; France	Flemming Mortensen; Denmark	Paulo Jorge Santos; Portugal
Singles C4	R. Ferraud; France	Flemming Mortensen; Denmark	Tommy Gilleras; Sweden
Singles C5	Thomas Axelsson; Sweden	Rob Visser; Netherlands	Roby Cusseneers; Belgium
Singles C5	Thomas Axelsson; Sweden	Rob Visser; Netherlands	Peter Kihlman; Sweden
Singles L1	Urban Andersson; Sweden	Borje Johansson; Sweden	John Welsh; Great Britain
Singles L2	Herbert Velroyen; West Germany	M. Stephens; United States	Ilija Djurasinovic; Yugoslavia
Singles L2	Herbert Velroyen; West Germany	M. Stephens; United States	O. Rouke; Ireland
Singles L3	Marc Piras; France	Thieu Vossen; Netherlands	Klaus Mueller; West Germany
Singles L3	Marc Piras; France	Thieu Vossen; Netherlands	Stephan Welting; West Germany
Singles L4	Kimmo Jokinen; Finland	Jorgen Nilsson; Sweden	Manfred Knabe; West Germany
Singles L4	Kimmo Jokinen; Finland	Jorgen Nilsson; Sweden	Z. Gajic; Yugoslavia
Singles L5	Franc Simonic; Yugoslavia	Marcelino Monesterial; United States	Philippe Roine; France
Singles L5	Franc Simonic; Yugoslavia	Marcelino Monesterial; United States	P. Hullerum; West Germany
Teams 1A	Finland (FIN)	United States (USA)	Great Britain (GBR); Mick Dolan; Brian Smith
Teams 1B	West Germany (FRG)	Finland (FIN)	Great Britain (GBR); Tony Edge; James Munkley; Tom Doughty
Teams 1C	West Germany (FRG)	Austria (AUT)	Belgium (BEL)
Teams 2	Austria (AUT)	France (FRA)	West Germany (FRG)
Teams 3	Austria (AUT)	West Germany (FRG)	South Korea (KOR)
Teams 4	West Germany (FRG)	Austria (AUT)	Hong Kong (HKG)

=== Women's events ===
Event	Gold	Silver	Bronze
Open 1B-4	Ruth Lamsbach; West Germany	Wong; Hong Kong	Vanderbosch; Netherlands
Open CL	Marianne Baertelsen; Denmark	Bernadette Darvand; France	Ingrid Borre; Belgium
Singles 1B	Jane Blackburn; Great Britain	Marit Lysen; Norway	Christiane Droux; Switzerland
Singles 1C	Becker; Great Britain	Dzaier Neil; Great Britain	None
Singles 2	Elisabeth Bisquolm; Switzerland	Rosa Schweizer; Austria	Ruth Lamsbach; West Germany
Singles 3	Christiane Weninger; West Germany	J. Brown; United States	R. Andre; France
Singles 4	Monique Van Den Bosch; Netherlands	Wong; Hong Kong	Rosa Zaugg; Switzerland
Singles C3	C. Coullanges; France	J. Petersen; Great Britain	Martha Johnson; Canada
Singles C4-5	Marie Brask; Sweden	E. Nesset; Norway	Morna Cloonan; Ireland
Singles L3	Evelyne Cretual; France	Margaret Heald; Great Britain	H. Gunnarsdottir; Iceland
Singles L4	Ingrid Borre; Belgium	Bernadette Darvand; France	A. Smith; Great Britain
Singles L4	Ingrid Borre; Belgium	Bernadette Darvand; France	Kristina Ness; Norway
Singles L5	Marianne Baertelsen; Denmark	Shuyun Wang; China	None
Teams 1A-C	Great Britain (GBR)	United States (USA); Pamela Fontaine	None
Teams 2	Austria (AUT)	Ireland (IRL)	Great Britain (GBR)
Teams 4	Switzerland (SUI); Jacqueline Blanc; Elisabeth Mettler-Kiener; Rosa Zaugg	Hong Kong (HKG)	West Germany (FRG)
