= Yang Yi (table tennis) =

Chinese retired para table tennis player (born 1952)

Personal information
- Born: 1952 (age 73–74) Liuzhou, Guangxi, China

Sport
- Sport: Table tennis
Medal record
Women's para table tennis
Representing China
Paralympic Games
| Gold medal – first place | 1992 Barcelona | Teams TT10 |
| Silver medal – second place | 1992 Barcelona | Singles TT9 |
| Bronze medal – third place | 1992 Barcelona | Open singles TT6–10 |
FESPIC Games
| Gold medal – first place | 1989 Kobe | Teams TT10 |
| Gold medal – first place | 1994 Beijing | Teams TT10 |
| Silver medal – second place | 1989 Kobe | Singles TT9 |
| Silver medal – second place | 1994 Beijing | Singles TT10 |

Yang Yi
- Traditional Chinese: 楊毅
- Simplified Chinese: 杨毅
Transcriptions
Standard Mandarin
- Hanyu Pinyin: Yáng Yì

Yang Yi (Chinese: 杨毅, born 1952) is a Chinese retired para table tennis player. She won a gold, a silver, and a bronze medal at the 1992 Summer Paralympics.

Yang Yi was disabled by polio at age 3. As an adult, her right leg is shorter than her left leg by 5 cm and much thinner. She began playing table tennis seriously in 1986, after her marriage in 1982 and the birth of her son in 1983.
