= Susanne Schwendtner =

Austrian para table tennis player

Personal information
- Born: May 12, 1968 (age 58) Schärding, Austria

Sport
- Country: Austria
- Sport: Para table tennis
Medal record
Representing Austria
Paralympic Games
Gold medal – first place	1996 Atlanta	Singles C5
Bronze medal – third place	1992 Barcelona	Singles C4
Bronze medal – third place	1992 Barcelona	Teams C5
Bronze medal – third place	1996 Atlanta	Open singles wheelchair
European Championships
Gold medal – first place	1995 Hillerod	Singles C5
Gold medal – first place	1995 Hillerod	Open singles wheelchair
Silver medal – second place	1995 Hillerod	Teams C5
Bronze medal – third place	1991 Salou	Singles C4

Susanne Schwendtner (née Witschnig; born 12 May 1968) is an Austrian para table tennis player.

She represented Austria at the 1996 Summer Paralympics in Atlanta, United States and she won two medals: the gold medal in the Women's Singles 5 event and one of the bronze medals in the Women's Open 1–5 event.
