= Samuel Von Einem =

Australian para table tennis player

Sam von Einem
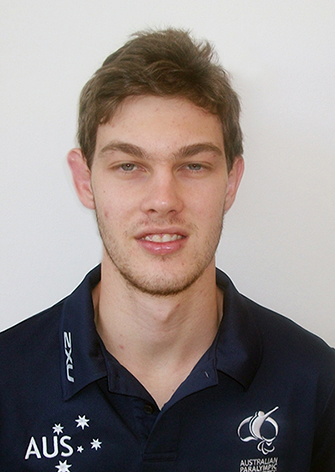
- 2016 Australian Paralympic team portrait

Personal information
- Full name: Samuel von Einem
- Nationality: Australian
- Born: 21 June 1995 (age 31)

Sport
- Country: Australia
- Sport: Table Tennis
Medal record
Para table tennis
Representing Australia
Paralympic Games
Silver medal – second place	2016 Rio	Men's singles C11
Bronze medal – third place	2024 Paris	Men's singles C11
World Championships
Bronze medal – third place	2018 Lasko-Celje	Men's singles C11

Samuel von Einem (born 21 June 1995) is an Australian Paralympic table tennis player. Von Einem has represented Australia in table tennis since 2011. He competed at the 2016 Rio Paralympics and 2020 Tokyo Paralympics, where he won silver medals in the Men's Class 11. At Rio Paralympics, he became Australia's first male table tennis medalist since Terry Biggs won gold in 1984. At the 2024 Paris Paralympics, he won a bronze medal.

== Personal ==
Von Einem was born on 21 June 1995 and is from Glengowrie, SA. Diagnosed with autism, he started playing tennis when he was five years old. In 2003, his family moved to Abu Dhabi where the hot climate helped him find his new passion of playing table tennis indoors. Von Einem has completed a Cert IV in Bookkeeping at TAFE SA – Adelaide City.

== Table tennis ==
Von Einem is a class 11 table tennis player, which means he competes in a division of players with an intellectual disability. Von Einem began competing in table tennis in 2007 and made his first international debut in 2011 when he was selected to represent Australia at the World Junior Circuit event held in Dedeo, Guam. Aged, 16 Von Einem won a silver medal as part of the Under 18 Junior Team. In 2015, Von Einem was confirmed as a class 11 athlete which made him eligible for international ranking points and the Paralympic Games. Not long after receiving this confirmation, Von Einem achieved a new career highlight where he competed in the men's singles at the Spanish Para Open in June 2015. Von Einem held off a strong French opponent to win gold in the Class 11.

At the 2016 Rio Paralympics, he won the silver medal in the Men's Class 11. He lost to world number one Florian Van Acker 2-3 (8-11, 18–16, 13–11, 5–11, 8–11).

At the 2020 Tokyo Paralympics, he won the silver medal in the Men's Class 11. He lost to Péter Pálos 2–3 (11–6, 7–11, 11–7, 6–11, 9–11).

Von Einem competed at the 2024 Paris Paralympics in the Men's Singles 11, Men's Doubles 18 and Mixed Doubles 17 He won the bronze medal in the Men's Singles 11 after being defeated by Gi Tae Kim in the semi-final.

Other achievements include :

- Winner of Class 11 singles at the 2013 Oceania Para Regionals
- Bronze medal in Class 11 singles at both the 2014 Hungary & Italian Para Open
- Silver medal in Class 11 teams with Rory Carroll at the 2014 Italian Para Open
- Open Singles and Class 11 Singles winner at the 2014 National AWD Championships

He took home bronze in the Men's Class 11 at the 2018 Para Table Tennis World Championships in Lasko-Celje, Slovenia.

Von Einem trains at Woodville District Table Tennis Club and is coached by David Lowe.

== Recognition ==
He has won the Table Tennis Australia Para Athlete of the Year Award in 2014 and 2016.
