= Kim Gi-tae =

South Korean para table tennis player

Personal information
- Native name: 김기태
- Born: 20 May 1998 (age 28) Bucheon, South Korea

Sport
- Sport: Table tennis
- Disability class: 11
Medal record
Men's para table tennis
Representing South Korea
Paralympic Games
Gold medal – first place	2024 Paris	Singles C11
World Championships
Gold medal – first place	2014 Beijing	Teams C11
Gold medal – first place	2022 Granada	Singles C11
Gold medal – first place	2022 Granada	Doubles C22
Gold medal – first place	2022 Granada	Mixed doubles C22
Asian Para Games
Gold medal – first place	2018 Jakarta	Singles C11
Gold medal – first place	2018 Jakarta	Teams C11
Gold medal – first place	2022 Hangzhou	Doubles C22
Gold medal – first place	2022 Hangzhou	Mixed doubles C22
Silver medal – second place	2014 Incheon	Singles C11
Bronze medal – third place	2022 Hangzhou	Singles C11
Asian Championships
Gold medal – first place	2013 Beijing	Singles C11
Gold medal – first place	2015 Amman	Singles C11
Gold medal – first place	2017 Beijing	Singles C11
Gold medal – first place	2019 Taichung	Singles C11
Silver medal – second place	2017 Beijing	Teams C11
Silver medal – second place	2019 Taichung	Singles C11

Kim Gi-tae (Korean: 김기태; born 20 May 1998) is a South Korean para table tennis player. He competed at the 2016, 2020 and 2024 Summer Paralympics; in 2024, he reached the finals of the men's individual class 11 event.
