= Matti Launonen =

Finnish para table tennis player (1944–2019)

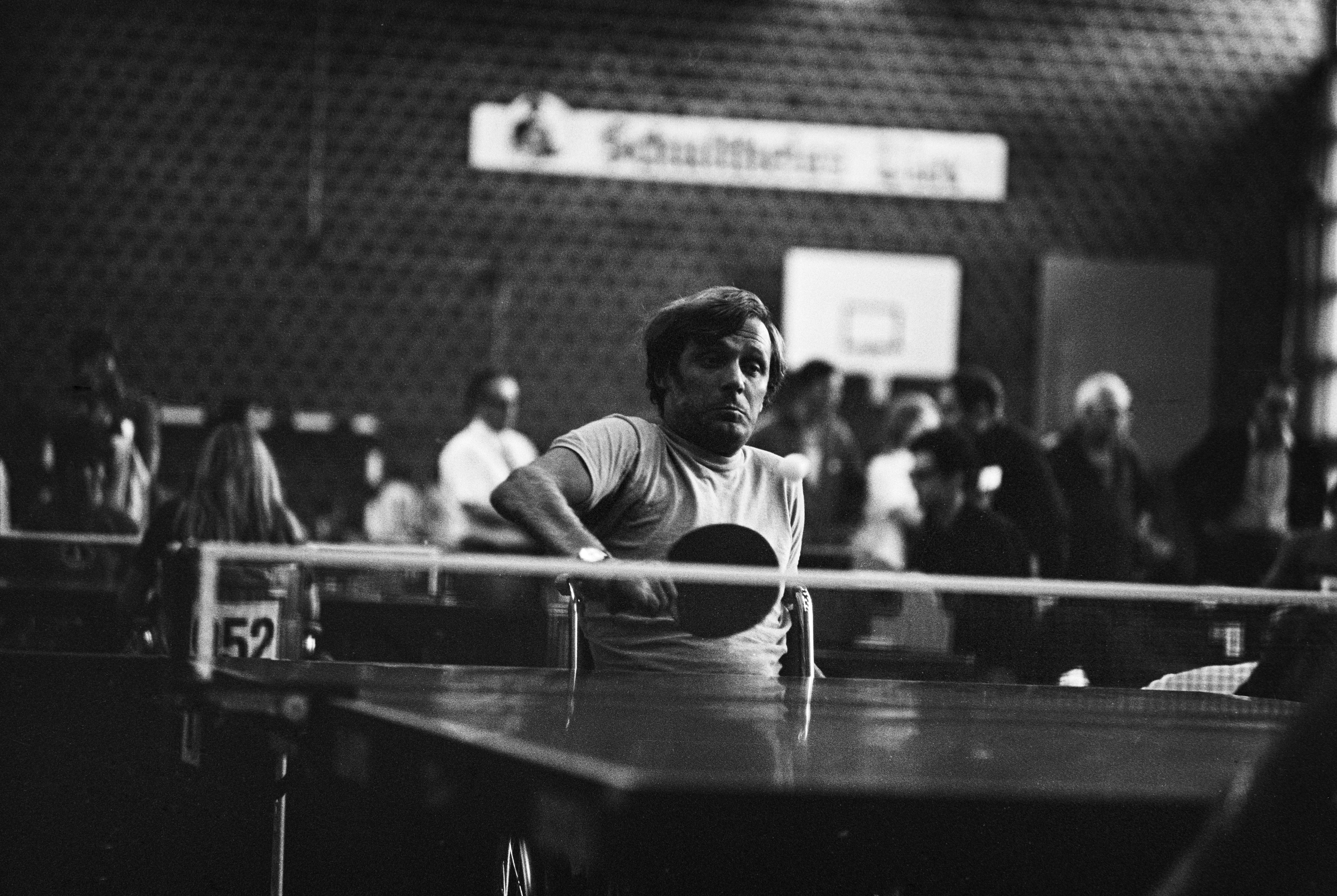
- Matti Launonen in 1972 Summer Paralympics

Personal information
- Born: 31 May 1944 Kuopio, Finland
- Died: 23 March 2019 (aged 74) Atlantis, Florida, U.S.

Sport
- Country: Finland
- Sport: Para table tennis
- Disability: Spinal cord injury
- Disability class: C1
Medal record
Para table tennis
Representing Finland
Paralympic Games
Gold medal – first place	1992 Barcelona	Men's singles C1
Gold medal – first place	1996 Atlanta	Men's teams C1-2
Silver medal – second place	1996 Atlanta	Men's singles C1
Silver medal – second place	2000 Sydney	Men's singles C1
Bronze medal – third place	1992 Barcelona	Men's teams C2
World Championships
Gold medal – first place	1990 Assen	Men's singles C1
Silver medal – second place	1998 Paris	Men's teams C1-2
Bronze medal – third place	1990 Assen	Men's teams C3
Bronze medal – third place	1998 Paris	Men's singles C1
Bronze medal – third place	2002 Taipei	Men's singles C1
European Championships
Gold medal – first place	1995 Hillerød	Men's singles C1
Gold medal – first place	1995 Hillerød	Men's teams C2
Gold medal – first place	1997 Stockholm	Men's singles C1
Gold medal – first place	1997 Stockholm	Men's teams C1-2
Gold medal – first place	1999 Piešťany	Men's singles C1
Silver medal – second place	2003 Zagreb	Men's singles C1
Silver medal – second place	2007 Kranjska Gora	Men's singles C1
Bronze medal – third place	1991 Salou	Men's singles C1
Bronze medal – third place	1991 Salou	Men's teams C2
Bronze medal – third place	2001 Frankfurt	Men's singles C1
Bronze medal – third place	2001 Frankfurt	Men's teams C1-2

Matti Launonen (31 May 1944 – 23 March 2019) was a Finnish para table tennis player who competed until his sudden death in 2019. He was one of the first table tennis players to win a world title in the para table tennis championships in Assen, Netherlands and a European title in Salou, Spain.

Launonen was seriously injured aged 18 in a car accident while travelling at more than 80 km/h, the car he was driving had handbrake fault and he couldn't stop the car: the car suddenly turned and rolled around.

He had a fall at his home and suffered a leg injury but died at hospital aged 74 in Florida.
