= Pascal Pereira-Leal =

French para table tennis player

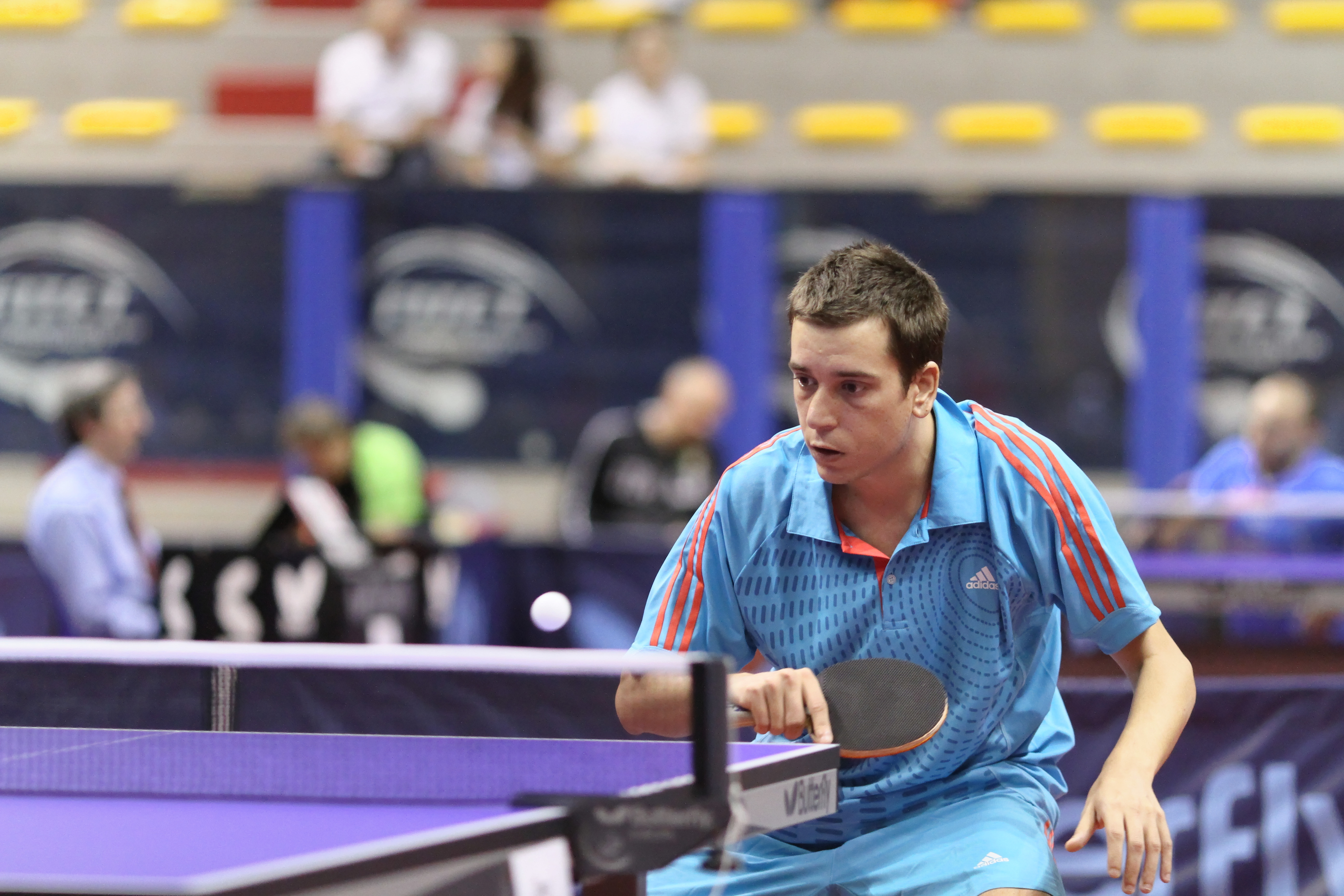

Personal information
- Born: 5 November 1982 (age 43) Ermont, France
- Height: 183 cm (6 ft 0 in)

Sport
- Country: France
- Sport: Para table tennis
- Disability: Intellectual impairment
- Disability class: C11
- Coached by: Pascal Griffault
Medal record
Para table tennis
Representing France
Paralympic Games
Bronze medal – third place	2012 London	Men's singles C11
World Championships
Gold medal – first place	2014 Beijing	Men's singles C11
European Championships
Silver medal – second place	2011 Split	Men's singles C11
Silver medal – second place	2011 Split	Men's teams C11
Bronze medal – third place	2013 Lignano	Men's singles C11
Bronze medal – third place	2013 Lignano	Men's teams C11

Pascal Pereira-Leal (born 5 November 1982) is a former French para table tennis player who played in international level events. He is a 2012 Paralympic bronze medalist, 2014 World champion and four-time European medalist.
