= Stanisław Frączyk =

Austrian-Polish para table tennis player

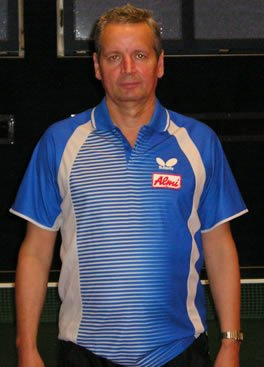

Personal information
- Nickname: Stani
- Born: 2 December 1952 (age 73) Łódź, Poland
- Height: 184 cm (6 ft 0 in)

Sport
- Country: Austria
- Sport: Para table tennis
- Disability: Heine Medina disease
- Disability class: C9
- Retired: 2016
Medal record
Para table tennis
Representing Austria
Paralympic Games
| Gold medal – first place | 1996 Atlanta | Men's singles C9 |
| Gold medal – first place | 1996 Atlanta | Men's open standing |
| Gold medal – first place | 2004 Athens | Men's singles C9 |
| Silver medal – second place | 1996 Atlanta | Men's teams C9-10 |
| Silver medal – second place | 2000 Sydney | Men's singles C9 |
| Silver medal – second place | 2004 Athens | Men's teams C9 |
| Silver medal – second place | 2012 London | Men's singles C9 |
World Championships
| Gold medal – first place | 1998 Paris | Men's singles C9 |
| Gold medal – first place | 2002 Taipei | Men's singles C9 |
| Gold medal – first place | 2002 Taipei | Men's open standing |
| Silver medal – second place | 1998 Paris | Men's open standing |
| Silver medal – second place | 1998 Paris | Men's teams C9 |
| Silver medal – second place | 2006 Montreux | Men's singles C9 |
| Bronze medal – third place | 2006 Montreux | Men's open standing |
European Championships
| Gold medal – first place | 1997 Stockholm | Men's singles C9 |
| Gold medal – first place | 1997 Stockholm | Men's teams C10 |
| Gold medal – first place | 1999 Piešťany | Men's singles C9 |
| Gold medal – first place | 1999 Piešťany | Men's doubles C6-10 |
| Gold medal – first place | 1999 Piešťany | Men's open standing |
| Gold medal – first place | 2001 Frankfurt | Men's singles C9 |
| Gold medal – first place | 2001 Frankfurt | Men's open standing |
| Gold medal – first place | 2003 Zagreb | Men's singles C9 |
| Gold medal – first place | 2003 Zagreb | Men's teams C9 |
| Gold medal – first place | 2005 Jesolo | Men's singles C9 |
| Gold medal – first place | 2011 Split | Men's singles C9 |
| Silver medal – second place | 1999 Piešťany | Men's teams C10 |
| Silver medal – second place | 2003 Zagreb | Men's open standing |
| Silver medal – second place | 2013 Lignano | Men's singles C9 |
| Bronze medal – third place | 1997 Stockholm | Men's open standing |
| Bronze medal – third place | 2001 Frankfurt | Men's teams C9 |
| Bronze medal – third place | 2005 Jesolo | Men's teams C9 |

Stanisław Frączyk (born 2 December 1952) is a retired Austrian-Polish para table tennis player. He is a triple Paralympic champion, a triple World champion, an eleven-time European champion and three time Polish national champion.

He has a medical condition called Heine-Medina disease which is caused his right leg to be five centimetres short than his left leg, he plays with a splint on his right leg. He was encouraged to play the sport by his older brother Zbiginiew Frączyk who is also a table tennis player who played at national level.
