= Michael Dempsey (table tennis) =

American para table tennis player

Michael Henry Dempsey
Personal information
- Nationality: American
- Born: September 8, 1956 Columbus, Ohio, United States
- Died: April 29, 2009 (aged 52) Riverside Methodist Hospital, San Diego, California

Sport
- Country: United States
- Sport: Para table tennis
- Disability: Paraplegia
- Disability class: C4
- Coached by: Jim Beckford; Chris Lehman; Christian Lillieroos; Rong Li
- Retired: 2004
Medal record
Para table tennis
Representing United States
Paralympic Games
Gold medal – first place	1976 Toronto	Men's teams 4
Gold medal – first place	1980 Arnhem	Men's singles 4
Gold medal – first place	1988 Seoul	Men's open singles 1A-4
Silver medal – second place	1972 Heidelberg	Men's singles 4
Silver medal – second place	1976 Toronto	Men's singles 4-5
Silver medal – second place	1980 Arnhem	Men's teams 4
Silver medal – second place	1992 Barcelona	Men's open singles 1-5
Bronze medal – third place	1972 Heidelberg	Men's teams 4
Bronze medal – third place	1984 Stoke Mandeville/New York	Men's singles 4
Bronze medal – third place	1988 Seoul	Men's singles 4
World Championships
Silver medal – second place	1990 Assen	Men's open singles
Bronze medal – third place	1990 Assen	Men's teams class 5
Parapan American Games
Gold medal – first place	1971 Kingston	Men's open singles
Gold medal – first place	1999 Mexico	Men's open singles
Gold medal – first place	1999 Mexico	Men's singles class 4
Gold medal – first place	1999 Mexico	Men's teams class 5
Gold medal – first place	2001 Buenos Aires	Men's singles class 4
Gold medal – first place	2001 Buenos Aires	Men's teams class 5

Michael Henry Dempsey (September 8, 1956 – April 29, 2009) was an American para table tennis player who competed in eight Paralympic Games. His best rank was world no.2 in class 4 in April 2001.

== Biography ==
When he was six months old, doctors discovered that Michael had a skin tumor on his back. A doctor gave him an injection to stop the growth but he had abnormalities with his legs as the tumor spread and attached onto his spinal cord resulting in loss of movement in his legs and was on a wheelchair for life.

== Table tennis career ==
=== Beginning ===
He first started playing table tennis in 1969. He competed along with other wheelchair athletes "according to function based on spinal cord injury level or comparable muscle strength". Dempsey competed in the least disable category. The U.S. Wheelchair Champion John Gray took 13-year-old Dempsey to the National Wheelchair Games in 1969. He competed as an unseeded newcomer however he successfully won his first gold medal after beating Serge Jelenevsky for the gold medal; this was one of Dempsey's first of thirty golds that he won in his career.

==== 1970s and 1980s ====
In the early 1970s, Dempsey kept improving on his table tennis skills by competing against able-bodied players in his training club in his hometown by taking part in local competitions. In July 1971, Dempsey took part in his first international competition: he won a gold medal in Kingston. He went on to win five more Pan-Am Singles Championships titles. Dempsey's practiced his table tennis skills with a Stiga robot at home and he defeated his mentor Gray to win a national championship in Ohio and also won another title along with Gray in the doubles to win against Jelenevsky and Ty Kaus.

In 1973, Dempsey was ranked no.1 among the young adult players of Ohio and ranked no. 6 in the male Ohio table tennis players category. He went to the World Championships in Stoke Mandeville, England where Michael won 1st of his seven World's singles titles, this was also where he had beaten Sam Hagai for the first time after his defeat in the 1972 Summer Paralympics Games in Heidelberg, he also won the doubles title with Gray.

Michael graduated in 1974 in Gahanna Lincoln High School, he awarded a Varsity sport jacket for "his achievements in table tennis and basketball" and was inducted into the National Honor Society for "his scholarship, character, leadership and service". In March 1974, Michael went to Mount Airy Lodge in Pennsylvania to visit a training center so that he could be coached to compete against top 15 or above able-bodied juniors in the United States and he was hoping to join the US junior team that will play against Germany in a tournament. From 1975 to 1977, Dempsey and his teammate Fletcher went on to win a doubles title together in 1975. After 1977, Dempsey won six singles consecutively from 1977 to 1982 in not just his class but in open categories.

In the early 1980s, Dempsey didn't win any singles or doubles titles in both Worlds' and Pan-Am Championships however he did win two golds and a bronze medal in 1985 in Vienna.

=== Winning major titles ===
Michael Dempsey won his first medals in the World Para Table Tennis Championships in Assen, Netherlands: he won a silver medal in the singles by Thomas Kreidel and won a bronze medal in the teams' event by France who went on to win the title.

During the 1990s, Dempsey won the most medals of his career in one event: three golds in the Para PanAmerican Games in Mexico. He won these medals in the singles, open singles and teams event along with Andre Scott.

== Paralympics success ==
Dempsey first competed in the 1972 Summer Paralympics in Heidelberg, West Germany at a young age of 16 where he was the youngest in the table tennis team. He won his first Paralympic medals: silver in singles match (Sam Hagai of Israel won the gold medal) and a bronze medal in the doubles along with Sam Fletcher. After his successful first competition at the Heidelberg Games, he was congratulated by the Ohio House of Representatives.

In the 1976 Summer Paralympics in Toronto, Canada, Dempsey won his first gold medal after defeating West Germany alongside his teammate Gary Kerr. He won a silver medal in the singles by being defeated by Baruch Hagai from Israel.

His third Games, the 1980 Summer Paralympics in Arnhem, Netherlands, he won a gold medal in the men's singles 4 by defeating Grady Uyt de Boogaardt of the Netherlands. He also won a silver medal with Kaus and Kerr in the teams' event.

Dempsey performed poorly in the 1984 Summer Paralympics in Stoke Mandeville after winning a bronze medal in the singles event while the teams' event didn't win any medals. However, in 1988, he defeated Guy Tisserant to win the gold medal in the open singles and a bronze medal in the singles category 4 event.

== Personal life ==
Michael met Shannon Kirk in 1978 while she worked in a bank: she worked alongside him while he was in a working partnership with Küschall, they both married on August 3, 1991. They travelled frequently around the world to places such as Hawaii, New Zealand and Australia. In December 2003, they adopted their infant son Henry from Kazakhstan.

He was inducted into three halls of fame for sporting career: Ohio Wheelchair Athletic Association in 1981, the California Table Tennis Hall of Fame in 2001 and US Table Tennis Hall of Fame one year later. Dempsey was also a long time member of the San Diego Table Tennis Association.

== Death ==
On April 29, Michael flew to Ohio to attend a board meeting in Greif Inc., after his meeting, Dempsey was in the middle of laughing with others but in the middle of this laugh, Dempsey suffered from a large brain aneurism and was rushed to Riverside Methodist Hospital in San Diego, California where he was later pronounced dead shortly afterwards.
