= Son Byeong-jun =

South Korean para table tennis player

Personal information
- Born: October 14, 1995 (age 30) Chuncheon, Gangwon, South Korea
- Height: 175 cm (5 ft 9 in)
- Weight: 73 kg (161 lb)

Sport
- Sport: Table tennis
- Playing style: Right-handed shakehand grip
- Disability class: 11
- Highest ranking: 3 (October 2012)
- Current ranking: 12 (February 2020)
Medal record
Men's para table tennis
Representing South Korea
Paralympic Games
Silver medal – second place	2012 London	Singles C11
World Championships
Gold medal – first place	2014 Beijing	Teams C11
Silver medal – second place	2014 Beijing	Singles C11
Asian Championships
Gold medal – first place	2011 Hong Kong	Singles C11
Gold medal – first place	2011 Hong Kong	Teams C11
Gold medal – first place	2019 Taichung	Teams C11
Silver medal – second place	2013 Beijing	Singles C11
Silver medal – second place	2017 Beijing	Teams C11
Bronze medal – third place	2017 Beijing	Singles C11

Son Byeong-jun (Korean: 손병준, born 14 October 1995) is a South Korean para table tennis player. He won a silver medal at the 2012 Summer Paralympics.

He has a congenital intellectual impairment.
