= Rudolf Hajek =

Austrian para table tennis player

Personal information
- Born: 18 August 1963 (age 62) Laa an der Thaya, Austria

Sport
- Country: Austria
- Sport: Para table tennis
Medal record
Representing Austria
Paralympic Games
Gold medal – first place	1988 Seoul	Singles 1B
Gold medal – first place	1992 Barcelona	Singles C2
Gold medal – first place	1992 Barcelona	Teams C2
Silver medal – second place	1996 Atlanta	Teams C1-2
Bronze medal – third place	1988 Seoul	Teams 1B
World Championships
Gold medal – first place	1990 Assen	Teams C2
Silver medal – second place	2002 Taipei	Teams C1-2
Bronze medal – third place	1990 Assen	Singles C2
European Championships
Gold medal – first place	1991 Salou	Singles C2
Gold medal – first place	1991 Salou	Teams C2
Silver medal – second place	1995 Hillerod	Teams C2
Silver medal – second place	1999 Piestany	Teams C1-2
Silver medal – second place	2001 Frankfurt	Teams C1-2
Bronze medal – third place	1995 Hillerod	Singles C2

Rudolf "Rudi" Hajek (born 18 August 1963) is an Austrian para table tennis player. He represented Austria at the Summer Paralympics in 1988, 1992, 1996 and 2004. In total, he won three gold medals and one silver medal.

At the 1996 Summer Paralympics held in Atlanta, Georgia, United States, he won the silver medal in the men's team 1-2 event together with Gerhard Scharf.
