= Table tennis at the 1992 Summer Paralympics =

Table tennis at the IX Paralympic Games
- Paralympic Table tennis

Paralympic symbol (1988–1994)

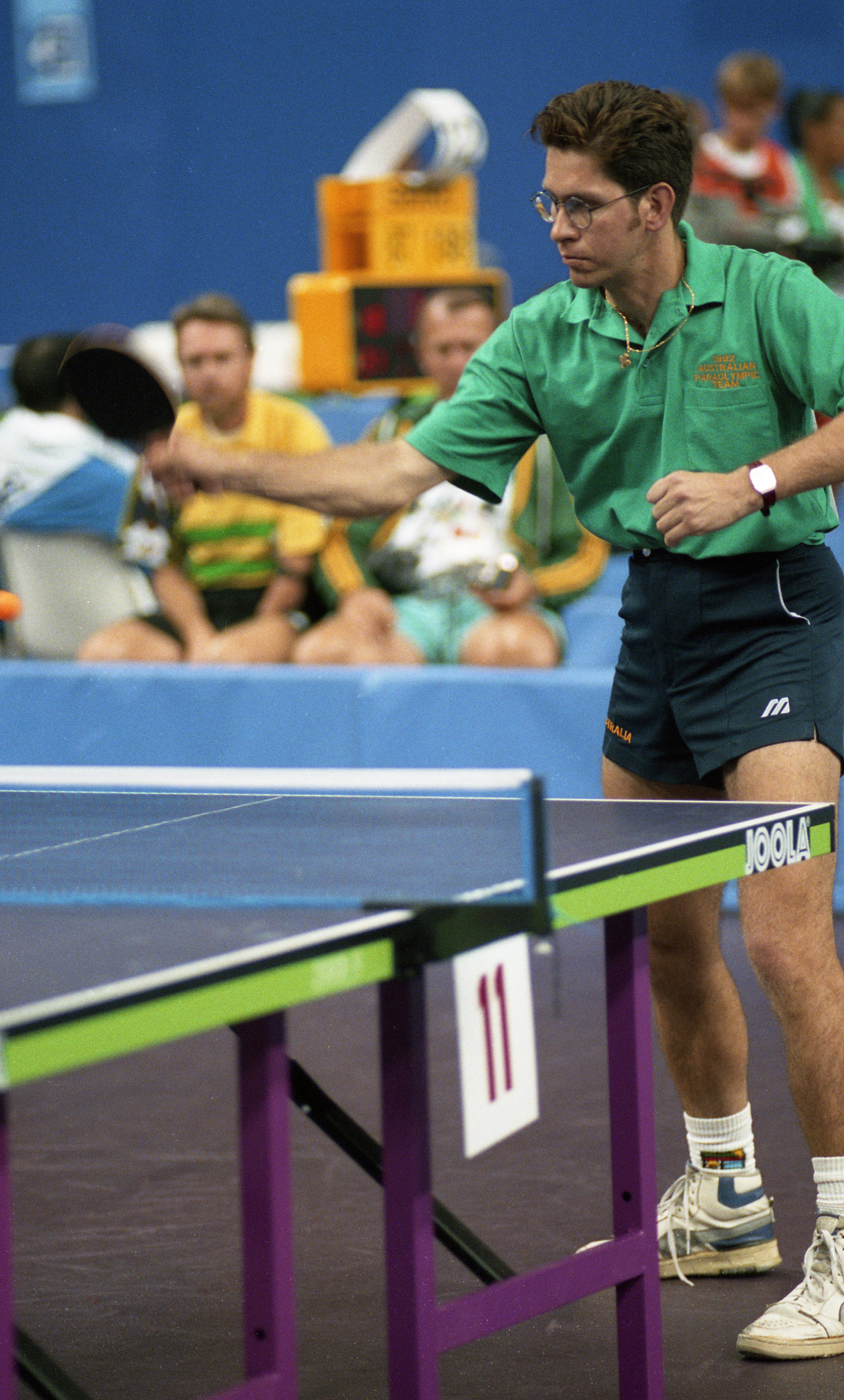
Table tennis at the 1992 Paralympics

Table tennis at the 1992 Summer Paralympics consisted of 30 events, 21 for men and 9 for women.

Swimming, athletics and table tennis used a medical based classification system for the Barcelona Games. This happened as the Games were in a transition period with a number of other sports starting to move to a fully functional based classification system.

== Medal table ==
Rank	Nation	Gold	Silver	Bronze	Total
1	Germany (GER)	9	9	10	28
2	Finland (FIN)	3	1	1	5
3	Hong Kong (HKG)	3	0	3	6
4	France (FRA)	2	5	5	12
5	China (CHN)	2	2	1	5
6	Japan (JPN)	2	1	3	6
7	Austria (AUT)	2	0	6	8
8	South Korea (KOR)	1	2	6	9
9	Denmark (DEN)	1	1	2	4
9	Great Britain (GBR)	1	1	2	4
9	United States (USA)	1	1	2	4
12	Netherlands (NED)	1	0	3	4
13	Belgium (BEL)	1	0	2	3
14	Israel (ISR)	1	0	0	1
15	Italy (ITA)	0	2	2	4
15	Sweden (SWE)	0	2	2	4
17	Switzerland (SUI)	0	2	1	3
18	Hungary (HUN)	0	1	1	2
19	Spain (ESP)	0	0	3	3
20	Independent Paralympic Participants (IPP)	0	0	1	1
20	Ireland (IRL)	0	0	1	1
Totals (21 entries)		30	30	57	117

== Medal summary ==
=== Men's events ===
Event	Gold	Silver	Bronze
Open 1–5	Guy Tisserant; France	Michael Dempsey; United States	Franz Mandl; Austria
Open 1–5	Guy Tisserant; France	Michael Dempsey; United States	Daniel Hatton; France
Open 6–10	Kimmo Jokinen; Finland	Michael Gerke; Germany	Gilles de la Bourdonnaye; France
Open 6–10	Kimmo Jokinen; Finland	Michael Gerke; Germany	Enrique Agudo; Spain
Singles 1	Matti Launonen; Finland	Ralf Kirchhoff; Germany	Hae Gon Lee; South Korea
Singles 1	Matti Launonen; Finland	Ralf Kirchhoff; Germany	Seong Hoon Kang; South Korea
Singles 2	Rudolf Hajek; Austria	Jari Kurkinen; Finland	Bruno Hassler; Germany
Singles 2	Rudolf Hajek; Austria	Jari Kurkinen; Finland	Kyung Mook Kim; South Korea
Singles 3	Michel Peeters; France	Neil Robinson; Great Britain	Marcel Andrey; Switzerland
Singles 3	Michel Peeters; France	Neil Robinson; Great Britain	Zlatko Kesler; Independent Paralympic Participants
Singles 4	Thomas Kreidel; Germany	Bruno Benedetti; France	Tae Hyung Um; South Korea
Singles 4	Thomas Kreidel; Germany	Bruno Benedetti; France	Arnie Chan; Great Britain
Singles 5	Kam Shing Kwong; Hong Kong	Guy Tisserant; France	So Boo Kim; South Korea
Singles 5	Kam Shing Kwong; Hong Kong	Guy Tisserant; France	Manuel Robles; Spain
Singles 6	Rainer Schmidt; Germany	Brian Nielsen; Denmark	Peter Stromstedt; Sweden
Singles 6	Rainer Schmidt; Germany	Brian Nielsen; Denmark	Kai Lundsteen; Denmark
Singles 7	Zeev Glikman; Israel	Thomas Kurfess; Germany	Matheus Vossen; Netherlands
Singles 7	Zeev Glikman; Israel	Thomas Kurfess; Germany	Jochen Wollmert; Germany
Singles 8	Mitchell Seidenfeld; United States	Kenichi Suzuki; Japan	Werner Maissenbacher; Germany
Singles 8	Mitchell Seidenfeld; United States	Kenichi Suzuki; Japan	Hiroshi Fujii; Japan
Singles 9	Kimmo Jokinen; Finland	Manfred Knabe; Germany	Rein Zijda; Netherlands
Singles 9	Kimmo Jokinen; Finland	Manfred Knabe; Germany	Thierry Garofalo; France
Singles 10	Michael Gerke; Germany	Gilles de la Bourdonnaye; France	Thomas Goeller; Austria
Singles 10	Michael Gerke; Germany	Gilles de la Bourdonnaye; France	Enrique Agudo; Spain
Teams 1	South Korea (KOR); Hae Gon Lee; Seong Hoon Kang	Switzerland (SUI); Rolf Zumkehr; Hans Rosenast	Germany (GER); Dieter Essbach; Ralf Kirchhoff
Teams 2	Austria (AUT); Gerhard Scharf; Rudolf Hajek	South Korea (KOR); Hyun Sang Park; Kyung Mook Kim	Germany (GER); Bruno Hassler; Helmut Sperling
Teams 2	Austria (AUT); Gerhard Scharf; Rudolf Hajek	South Korea (KOR); Hyun Sang Park; Kyung Mook Kim	Finland (FIN); Matti Launonen; Jari Kurkinen
Teams 3	Great Britain (GBR); Phillip Evans; James Rawson; Neil Robinson	Germany (GER); Rainer Kolb; Werner Dorr	France (FRA); Daniel Hatton; Michel Peeters
Teams 3	Great Britain (GBR); Phillip Evans; James Rawson; Neil Robinson	Germany (GER); Rainer Kolb; Werner Dorr	South Korea (KOR); Ki Hoon Kim; Young Soo Kim; Jong Dae An
Teams 4	Hong Kong (HKG); Yin Biu Wong; Sum Tak Ho	Sweden (SWE); Jan-Krister Gustavsson; Joergen Johansson	Germany (GER); Gunter Altenburg; Winfried Huhn
Teams 4	Hong Kong (HKG); Yin Biu Wong; Sum Tak Ho	Sweden (SWE); Jan-Krister Gustavsson; Joergen Johansson	Belgium (BEL); Robert Lorent; Dimitri Ghion
Teams 5	Germany (GER); Thomas Kreidel; Karl-Heinz Weber	South Korea (KOR); Choon Bae Jang; So Boo Kim; Tae Hyung Um	Hong Kong (HKG); Kam Shing Kwong; Sui Lam Ip
Teams 5	Germany (GER); Thomas Kreidel; Karl-Heinz Weber	South Korea (KOR); Choon Bae Jang; So Boo Kim; Tae Hyung Um	Austria (AUT); Manfred Dollmann; Leo Hochrathner; Franz Mandl; Salvatore Smarrazzo
Teams 6	Denmark (DEN); Brian Nielsen; Kai Lundsteen	Germany (GER); Winfried Stelzner; Rainer Schmidt	Sweden (SWE); Mattias Karlsson; Peter Stromstedt
Teams 8	Japan (JPN); Kenichi Suzuki; Hiroshi Fujii	Sweden (SWE); Peter Huglow; Mikael Vestling; Thomas Larsson	Germany (GER); Jochen Wollmert; Florian Lechner; Rainer Schmidt; Werner Maissenbacher
Teams 8	Japan (JPN); Kenichi Suzuki; Hiroshi Fujii	Sweden (SWE); Peter Huglow; Mikael Vestling; Thomas Larsson	Great Britain (GBR); David Young; David Hope
Teams 9	Japan (JPN); Tatsuya Minami; Shuzo Saiki	Italy (ITA); Eberhard Walzl; Andrea Furlan	Germany (GER); Wolfgang Horsch; Dieter Tollwerth; Manfred Knabe; Thomas Kurfess
Teams 9	Japan (JPN); Tatsuya Minami; Shuzo Saiki	Italy (ITA); Eberhard Walzl; Andrea Furlan	France (FRA); Thierry Garofalo; Alain Pichon
Teams 10	Germany (GER); Michael Gerke; Marcus Vahle; C. Windecker	France (FRA); Claude Chédeau; Gilles de la Bourdonnaye; Philippe Roine	Denmark (DEN); Frands Havaleschka; Jes Jacob; Torben Pehrsson
Teams 10	Germany (GER); Michael Gerke; Marcus Vahle; C. Windecker	France (FRA); Claude Chédeau; Gilles de la Bourdonnaye; Philippe Roine	United States (USA); Marcelino Monasterial; Mitchell Seidenfeld

=== Women's events ===
Event	Gold	Silver	Bronze
Open 1–5	Christiane Weninger; Germany	Maria Nardelli; Italy	Terese Terranova; United States
Open 1–5	Christiane Weninger; Germany	Maria Nardelli; Italy	Yuet Wah Fung; Hong Kong
Open 6–10	Ingrid Borre; Belgium	Zhang Xiaoling; China	Yang Yi; China
Open 6–10	Ingrid Borre; Belgium	Zhang Xiaoling; China	Michiyo Nuruki; Japan
Singles 3	Jolanda Paardekam; Netherlands	Monika Bartheidel; Germany	Ruth Lamsbach; Germany
Singles 3	Jolanda Paardekam; Netherlands	Monika Bartheidel; Germany	Ilona Sasváriné; Hungary
Singles 4	Monika Sikora; Germany	Christiane Weninger; Germany	Gabriele Kirchmair; Austria
Singles 4	Monika Sikora; Germany	Christiane Weninger; Germany	Susanne Witschnig; Austria
Singles 5	Gisela Roosen; Germany	Rosa Zaugg; Switzerland	Yuet Wah Fung; Hong Kong
Singles 5	Gisela Roosen; Germany	Rosa Zaugg; Switzerland	Maria Nardelli; Italy
Singles 9	Zhang Xiaoling; China	Yang Yi; China	Michiyo Nuruki; Japan
Singles 9	Zhang Xiaoling; China	Yang Yi; China	Ingrid Borre; Belgium
Teams 3	Germany (GER); Monika Bartheidel; Ruth Lamsbach	Hungary (HUN); Ilona Sasváriné; Judit Pusztafine	Ireland (IRL); Esther Stynes; Siobhan Callanan
Teams 5	Hong Kong (HKG); Yuet Wah Fung; Pui Yi Wong	Germany (GER); Christiane Weninger; Monika Sikora; Gisela Pohle; Gisela Roosen	Italy (ITA); Maria Nardelli; Christina Ploner; Patrizia Sacca
Teams 5	Hong Kong (HKG); Yuet Wah Fung; Pui Yi Wong	Germany (GER); Christiane Weninger; Monika Sikora; Gisela Pohle; Gisela Roosen	Austria (AUT); Gabriele Kirchmair; Susanne Witschnig
Teams 10	China (CHN); Zhang Xiaoling; Yang Yi	France (FRA); Martine Thierry; Michelle Sévin; Claire Odeide; Bernadette Darvand	Netherlands (NED); Patrizia Meeus; Diane Hendriks; I. Hoek-Heppenhuis
Teams 10	China (CHN); Zhang Xiaoling; Yang Yi	France (FRA); Martine Thierry; Michelle Sévin; Claire Odeide; Bernadette Darvand	Germany (GER); Christa Gebhardt; U. Lindgens-Strach
