= Yaron Opshtien =

Israeli Paralympic table tennis player

Personal information
- Native name: ירון אופשטיין
- Born: 1967 (age 58–59)

Sport
- Country: Israel
- Sport: Para table tennis; Para swimming
Medal record
Event / 1st / 2nd / 3rd; Paralympic Games / 1 / 0 / 0
Representing Israel
Paralympic Games
Table tennis
| Gold medal – first place | 1984 New York | Singles C3 |

Yaron Opshtien (Hebrew: ירון אופשטיין; born 1967) is an Israeli former paralympic competitor in table tennis and para swimming.

== Career ==
Opshtien was a member of the Israel Sports Center for the Disabled.

At the 1984 Summer Paralympics he competed in table tennis and para swimming: He won a gold medal competing in table tennis at the singles C3 event. He also ranked seventh in the 25 metre freestyle C6 para swimming event. Opshtien was also to compete in the 50 metre freestyle C6 event but failed to start his swim and was not included in the final ranking.

Opshtien is founder of Acc company for graphic and online accessibility needs for the disabled.
