= Table tennis at the 1996 Summer Paralympics =

Table tennis at the X Paralympic Games
- Paralympic Table tennis
- Competitors: 210 from 31 nations

Paralympic symbol (1994-2004)

Table tennis at the 1996 Summer Paralympics consisted of 28 events, 17 for men and 11 for women.

== Medal table ==
Rank	Nation	Gold	Silver	Bronze	Total
1	France (FRA)	6	6	5	17
2	Germany (GER)	4	3	7	14
3	Austria (AUT)	3	3	5	11
4	South Korea (KOR)	3	0	3	6
5	China (CHN)	3	0	2	5
6	Sweden (SWE)	2	3	1	6
7	United States (USA)	2	1	2	5
8	Belgium (BEL)	1	2	2	5
9	Finland (FIN)	1	1	1	3
10	Denmark (DEN)	1	0	0	1
10	Hungary (HUN)	1	0	0	1
10	Yugoslavia (YUG)	1	0	0	1
13	Hong Kong (HKG)	0	3	1	4
14	Czech Republic (CZE)	0	3	0	3
15	Great Britain (GBR)	0	1	2	3
15	Slovakia (SVK)	0	1	2	3
17	Mexico (MEX)	0	1	0	1
18	Chinese Taipei (TPE)	0	0	2	2
18	Japan (JPN)	0	0	2	2
18	Netherlands (NED)	0	0	2	2
21	Argentina (ARG)	0	0	1	1
21	Italy (ITA)	0	0	1	1
21	Moldova (MDA)	0	0	1	1
21	Nigeria (NGR)	0	0	1	1
21	Poland (POL)	0	0	1	1
21	Spain (ESP)	0	0	1	1
Totals (26 entries)		28	28	45	101

=== Participating nations ===
- Argentina (8)
- Austria (10)
- Belgium (9)
- Brazil (4)
- China (2)
- Chinese Taipei (3)
- Czech Republic (9)
- Denmark (5)
- Finland (5)
- France (21)
- Germany (27)
- Great Britain (10)
- Hong Kong (5)
- Hungary (6)
- Ireland (4)
- Israel (4)
- Italy (4)
- Japan (5)
- Mexico (3)
- Moldova (1)
- Netherlands (7)
- Nigeria (2)
- Poland (2)
- Russia (1)
- Slovakia (5)
- South Korea (12)
- Spain (5)
- Sweden (14)
- Switzerland (3)
- United States (12)
- Yugoslavia (2)

== Medal summary ==
=== Men's events ===
Event	Gold	Silver	Bronze
Open 1–5	Thomas Kreidel; Germany	Dimitri Ghion; Belgium	Nasiru Sule; Nigeria
Open 1–5	Thomas Kreidel; Germany	Dimitri Ghion; Belgium	Bruno Benedetti; France
Open 6–10	Stanisław Frączyk; Austria	Ladislav Gáspár; Slovakia	Chih Shan Hsu; Chinese Taipei
Open 6–10	Stanisław Frączyk; Austria	Ladislav Gáspár; Slovakia	Gilles de la Bourdonnaye; France
Singles 1	Hae Gon Lee; South Korea	Matti Launonen; Finland	José Daniel Haylan; Argentina
Singles 1	Hae Gon Lee; South Korea	Matti Launonen; Finland	Kang Sung-hoon; South Korea
Singles 2	Kyung Mook Kim; South Korea	Vincent Boury; France	Gerhard Scharf; Austria
Singles 2	Kyung Mook Kim; South Korea	Vincent Boury; France	Jari Kurkinen; Finland
Singles 3	Zlatko Kesler; Yugoslavia	Neil Robinson; Great Britain	James Rawson; Great Britain
Singles 3	Zlatko Kesler; Yugoslavia	Neil Robinson; Great Britain	Fritz Altendorfer; Austria
Singles 4	Bruno Benedetti; France	Michal Stefanu; Czech Republic	Thomas Kreidel; Germany
Singles 4	Bruno Benedetti; France	Michal Stefanu; Czech Republic	Christian Sutter; Austria
Singles 5	Guy Tisserant; France	Kam Shing Kwong; Hong Kong	Chang Shen Chou; Chinese Taipei
Singles 5	Guy Tisserant; France	Kam Shing Kwong; Hong Kong	Ernst Bolldén; Sweden
Singles 6	Brian Nielsen; Denmark	Mattias Karlsson; Sweden	Harold Kersten; Netherlands
Singles 7	Tahl Leibovitz; United States	Jochen Wollmert; Germany	Thomas Kurfess; Germany
Singles 8	Magnus Andree; Sweden	Mitchell Seidenfeld; United States	Vladimir Polkanov; Moldova
Singles 8	Magnus Andree; Sweden	Mitchell Seidenfeld; United States	Kenichi Suzuki; Japan
Singles 9	Stanisław Frączyk; Austria	Olivier Chateigner; France	Alain Pichon; France
Singles 9	Stanisław Frączyk; Austria	Olivier Chateigner; France	Ladislav Gáspár; Slovakia
Singles 10	Gilles de la Bourdonnaye; France	Robert Bader; Sweden	Enrique Agudo; Spain
Singles 10	Gilles de la Bourdonnaye; France	Robert Bader; Sweden	Kwang Hoon Jung; South Korea
Teams 1–2	Finland (FIN); Matti Launonen; Jari Kurkinen	Austria (AUT); Rudolf Hajek; Gerhard Scharf	Germany (GER); Dieter Essbach; Werner Knaak; Udo Pohle; Otto Vilsmeier
Teams 1–2	Finland (FIN); Matti Launonen; Jari Kurkinen	Austria (AUT); Rudolf Hajek; Gerhard Scharf	South Korea (KOR); Kyung Mook Kim; Haun Park; Hae Gon Lee; Kang Sung-hoon
Teams 3	South Korea (KOR); Young Soo Kim; Jong Dae An; Ki Hoon Kim	Austria (AUT); Peter Starl; Fritz Altendorfer; Manfred Dollmann	Great Britain (GBR); James Rawson; Neil Robinson
Teams 3	South Korea (KOR); Young Soo Kim; Jong Dae An; Ki Hoon Kim	Austria (AUT); Peter Starl; Fritz Altendorfer; Manfred Dollmann	Germany (GER); Jan Guertler; Werner Dorr
Teams 4–5	Sweden (SWE); Ernst Bolldén; Patrik Högstedt; Jörgen Johansson; Jan-Krister Gustavsson	France (FRA); Christophe Pinna; Bruno Benedetti; Christophe Durand; Guy Tisserant	Belgium (BEL); Dimitri Ghion; Alain Ledoux; Jean-Marc Pletinckx
Teams 4–5	Sweden (SWE); Ernst Bolldén; Patrik Högstedt; Jörgen Johansson; Jan-Krister Gustavsson	France (FRA); Christophe Pinna; Bruno Benedetti; Christophe Durand; Guy Tisserant	Austria (AUT); Christian Sutter; Franz Mandl
Teams 6–8	Germany (GER); Thomas Kurfess; Jochen Wollmert; Thomas Schmitt; Werner Maissenbacher	Sweden (SWE); Thomas Larsson; Magnus Andree; Mikael Vestling	United States (USA); Tahl Leibovitz; Mitchell Seidenfeld
Teams 9–10	France (FRA); Alain Pichon; Olivier Chateigner; Gilles de la Bourdonnaye	Austria (AUT); Stanisław Frączyk; Thomas Goeller	Germany (GER); Bernd Mueller; Peter Faehnrich; Andre Schmandt
Teams 9–10	France (FRA); Alain Pichon; Olivier Chateigner; Gilles de la Bourdonnaye	Austria (AUT); Stanisław Frączyk; Thomas Goeller	Slovakia (SVK); Ladislav Gáspár; Emil Dovalovszki

=== Women's events ===
Event	Gold	Silver	Bronze
Open 1–5	Christiane Pape; Germany	Wong Pui Yi; Hong Kong	Susanne Schwendtner; Austria
Open 1–5	Christiane Pape; Germany	Wong Pui Yi; Hong Kong	Yuet Wah Fung; Hong Kong
Open 6–10	Zhang Xiaoling; China	Ingrid Borre; Belgium	Luo Fuqun; China
Open 6–10	Zhang Xiaoling; China	Ingrid Borre; Belgium	Marie-Claire Odeide-Simian; France
Singles 1–2	Isabelle Lafaye; France	Anne-Marie Gibelin; France	Baerbel Rode; Germany
Singles 3	Ilona Sasváriné Paulik; Hungary	Monica Bartheidel; Germany	Marie-Line Pollet; Belgium
Singles 4	Jennifer Johnson; United States	Christiane Pape; Germany	Gertrudis Laemers; Netherlands
Singles 5	Susanne Schwendtner; Austria	María Hoffmann; Mexico	Maria Nardelli; Italy
Singles 5	Susanne Schwendtner; Austria	María Hoffmann; Mexico	Gisela Pohle; Germany
Singles 6–8	Ingrid Borre; Belgium	Martine Thierry; France	Zhang Xiaoling; China
Singles 9	Luo Fuqun; China	Marie-Claire Odeide-Simian; France	Michiyo Nuruki; Japan
Singles 10	Michelle Sévin; France	Jolana Davidková; Czech Republic	Krystyna Jagodzinska; Poland
Teams 3–5	Germany (GER); Monica Bartheidel; Monika Sikora; Gisela Pohle; Christiane Pape	Hong Kong (HKG); Yuet Wah Fung; Pui Yi Wong	United States (USA); Terese Terranova; Jennifer Johnson; Jacqueline di Lorenzo
Teams 6–10	China (CHN); Xiaoling Zhang; Fuqun Luo	Czech Republic (CZE); Eva Pestova; Jolana Davidková	France (FRA); Martine Thierry; Michelle Sévin; Marie-Claire Odeide-Simian

== See also ==
- Table tennis at the 1996 Summer Olympics
