= Péter Pálos =

Hungarian para table tennis player

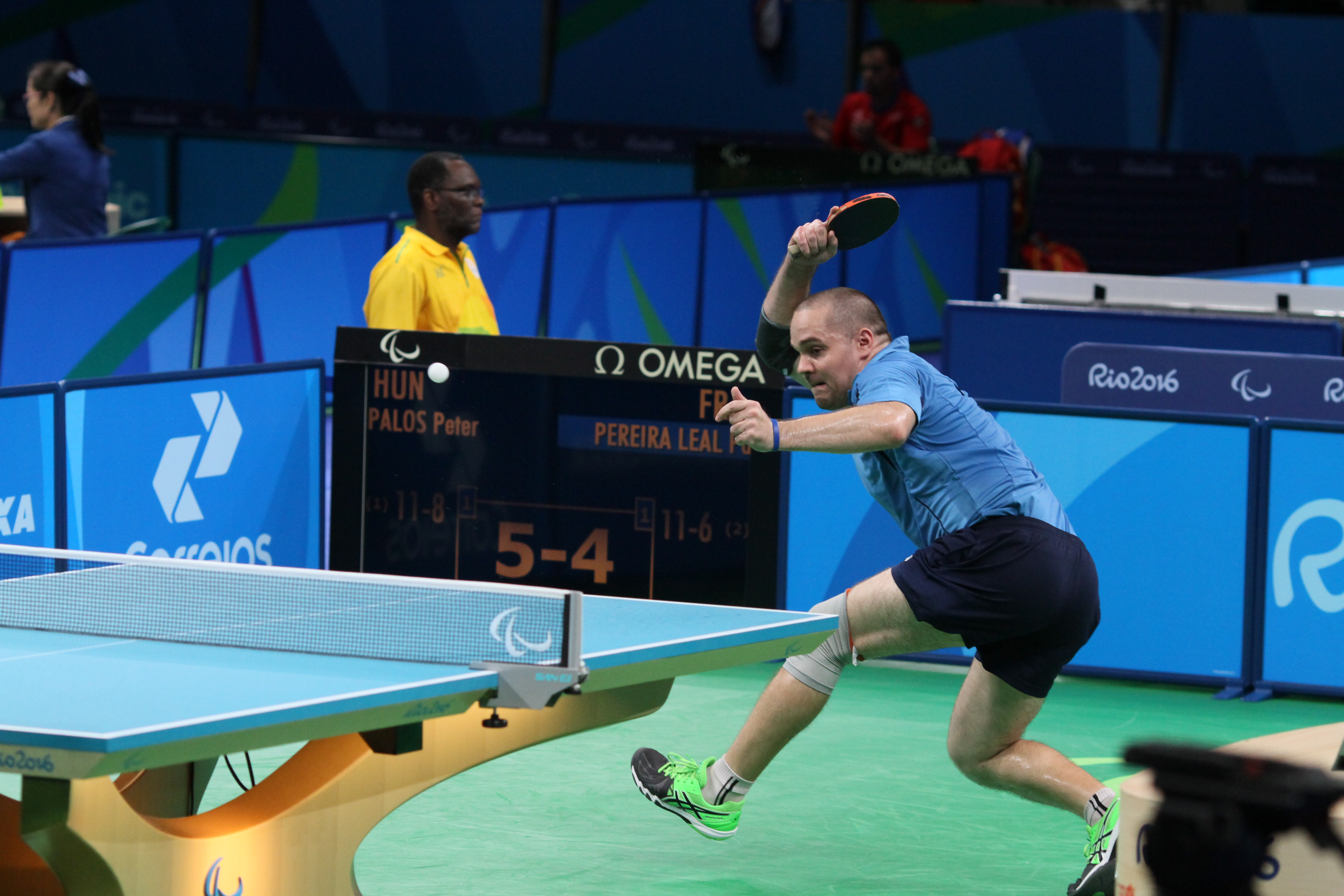
- Pálos at the 2016 Summer Paralympics in Rio de Janeiro

Personal information
- Born: 31 August 1985 (age 40) Budapest, Hungary
- Home town: Budapest, Hungary
- Height: 1.76 m (5 ft 9 in)
- Weight: 91 kg (201 lb)

Sport
- Country: Hungary
- Sport: Para table tennis
- Disability: Intellectual impairment
- Disability class: C11
- Club: BVSC
- Coached by: Márton Marsi (2005 - )
Medal record
Para table tennis
Representing Hungary
Paralympic Games
Gold medal – first place	2012 London	Men's singles C11
Bronze medal – third place	2016 Rio de Janeiro	Men's singles C11
Bronze medal – third place	2024 Paris	Singles C11
World Championships
Silver medal – second place	2018 Lasko	Men's singles C11
Bronze medal – third place	2014 Beijing	Men's singles C11
European Championships
Gold medal – first place	2011 Split	Men's singles C11
Gold medal – first place	2017 Lasko	Men's singles C11
Silver medal – second place	2013 Lignano	Men's singles C11

Péter Pálos (born 31 August 1985) is a Hungarian para table tennis player. He is one of Hungary's top performing Paralympic table tennis players as a former World Number One in his sports class 11 on three occasions: April to September 2013, April to September 2014 and August to October 2015.
