= Gerhard Scharf =

Austrian para table tennis player

Personal information
- Born: 21 September 1959 (age 66) Wiener Neustadt, Austria

Sport
- Country: Austria
- Sport: Para table tennis; Track and field
Medal record
Representing Austria
Paralympic Games
Gold medal – first place	1992 Barcelona	Teams C2
Silver medal – second place	1996 Atlanta	Teams C1-2
Bronze medal – third place	1996 Atlanta	Singles C2
World Championships
Gold medal – first place	1990 Assen	Teams C2
Bronze medal – third place	1990 Assen	Singles C2
Bronze medal – third place	1998 Paris	Teams C1-2
European Championships
Gold medal – first place	1991 Salou	Teams C2
Gold medal – first place	1995 Hillerod	Singles C2
Silver medal – second place	1991 Salou	Singles C2
Silver medal – second place	1995 Hillerod	Teams C2
Silver medal – second place	1999 Piestany	Teams C1-2
Silver medal – second place	2001 Frankfurt	Teams C1-2
Bronze medal – third place	1997 Stockholm	Singles C2
Bronze medal – third place	1997 Stockholm	Teams C1-2

Gerhard Scharf (born 21 September 1959) is an Austrian Paralympic athlete and para table tennis player. At the 1984 Summer Paralympics he competed in athletics and at the Summer Paralympics of 1988, 1992, 1996 and 2000 he competed in individual and team para table tennis events. In total, he won one gold medal, one silver medal and one bronze medal at the Summer Paralympics, all in table tennis.

In the Men's Teams 2 event at the 1992 Summer Paralympics he won the gold medal together with Rudolf Hajek. At the 1996 Summer Paralympics he won two medals in table tennis events: the silver medal in the Men's Teams 1–2, once again together with Rudolf Hajek, and one of the bronze medals in the Men's Singles 2 event.
