= Michael Hackett (athlete) =

Australian Paralympic athlete

Personal information
- Nationality: Australian
Medal record
Men's para-athletics
Representing Australia
Paralympic Games
Silver medal – second place	1988 Seoul	High Jump A4A9
Bronze medal – third place	1992 Barcelona	High Jump J2

Michael Hackett from New South Wales is an Australian Paralympic athlete. He won a silver medal at the 1988 Seoul Paralympics in the Men's High Jump A4A9 event and a bronze medal at the 1992 Barcelona Paralympics in the Men's High Jump J2 event.
