= Table tennis at the 2004 Summer Paralympics – Women's team – Class 6–10 =

Table Tennis - Women's Teams 6-10 at the XII Paralympic Games
- Paralympic Table Tennis
- Venue: Galatsi Olympic Hall
- Dates: 23–27 September 2004
- Competitors: 5

Medalists
1st place, gold medalist(s)		Lei Lina; Li Yu Qiang; Zhang Xiaoling; Liu Mei Li	China
2nd place, silver medalist(s)		Miroslawa Turowska; Natalia Partyka; Krystyna Jagodzinska; Malgorzata Grzelak	Poland
3rd place, bronze medalist(s)		Claire Mairie; Audrey Le Morvan; Michelle Sévin; Thu Kamkasomphou	France

The Women's Teams 6-10 table tennis competition at the 2004 Summer Paralympics was held from 23 to 27 September at the Galatsi Olympic Hall.

Classes 6–10 were for athletes with a physical impairment who competed from a standing position; the lower the number, the greater the impact the impairment had on an athlete’s ability to compete.

The event was won by the team representing China. As there were only 6 teams competing, this class was decided by a round-robin group only.

== Results ==
Rank	Competitor	MP	W	L	Points	CHN	POL	FRA	RUS	CZE
1st place, gold medalist(s)	China	4	4	0	12:3	x	3:2	3:0	3:0	3:1
2nd place, silver medalist(s)	Poland	4	3	1	11:5	2:3	x	3:1	3:0	3:1
3rd place, bronze medalist(s)	France	4	2	2	7:9	0:3	1:3	x	3:2	3:1
4	Russia	4	1	3	5:11	0:3	0:3	2:3	x	3:2
5	Czech Republic	4	0	4	5:12	1:3	1:3	1:3	2:3	x

== Team Lists ==
China; Lei Lina; Li Yu Qiang; Zhang Xiaoling; Liu Mei Li	Poland; Miroslawa Turowska; Natalia Partyka; Krystyna Jagodzinska; Malgorzata Grzelak	France; Claire Mairie; Audrey Le Morvan; Michelle Sévin; Thu Kamkasomphou	Russia; Olga Komleva; Julija Ovsjannikova; Raisa Tchebanika
Czech Republic; Jaroslava Janeckova; Jolana Matouskova; Michala Zakova
