= Table tennis at the 2012 Summer Paralympics – Women's team – Class 6–10 =

Table tennis Women's team C6-10 at the XIV Paralympic Games
- Venue: ExCeL Exhibition Centre
- Dates: 5–8 September 2012
- Competitors: 10 from 10 nations

Medalists
1st place, gold medalist(s)		Fan Lei; Lei Lina; Liu Meili; Yang Qian	China
2nd place, silver medalist(s)		Ümran Ertiş; Neslihan Kavas; Kübra Öçsoy	Turkey
3rd place, bronze medalist(s)		Alicja Eigner; Małgorzata Jankowska; Natalia Partyka; Karolina Pęk	Poland

The women's team table tennis class 6–10 tournament at the 2012 Summer Paralympics in London took place from 5 September to 8 September 2012 at ExCeL Exhibition Centre. Classes 6–10 were for athletes with a physical impairment who competed from a standing position.

== Bracket ==
First round
1
16
Egypt (EGY)	1
Ukraine (UKR)	3
5
12
13
4
3
14
11
6
Brazil (BRA)	3
Netherlands (NED)	2
15
2

Quarter finals
China (CHN)	3
Ukraine (UKR)	0
Australia (AUS)	2
France (FRA)	3
Turkey (TUR)	3
Russia (RUS)	2
Brazil (BRA)	1
Poland (POL)	3

Semifinals
China (CHN)	3
France (FRA)	0
Turkey (TUR)	3
Poland (POL)	2

Gold Medal
China (CHN)	3
Turkey (TUR)	0
Bronze medal
France (FRA)	2
Poland (POL)	3

== Results ==
=== First round ===
5 September 2012; 16:30	Egypt	1–3	Ukraine

Report	Individual matches
Faiza Mahmoud	0–3	Viktoriia Safonova	9–11, 1–11, 7–11
Angham Maghraby	3–1	Antonina Khodzynska	11–7, 8–11, 11–8, 11–5
Angham Maghraby	1–3	Viktoriia Safonova	8–11, 7–11, 12–10, 5–11
Faiza Mahmoud	0–3	Antonina Khodzynska	11–13, 8–11, 9–11

5 September 2012; 16:30	Brazil	3–2	Netherlands

Report	Individual matches
Bruna Alexandre	3–1	Kelly van Zon	11–3, 11–6, 7–11, 11–2
Jane Rodrigues	2–3	Wendy Schrijver	11–4, 11–8, 9–11, 8–11, 9–11
Jane Rodrigues	1–3	Kelly van Zon	7–11, 11–9, 9–11, 12–14
Bruna Alexandre	3–0	Wendy Schrijver	11–6, 11–6, 11–5
Bruna Alexandre / Jane Rodrigues	3–0	Kelly van Zon / Wendy Schrijver	11–6, 11–7, 11–3

=== Quarter-finals ===
6 September 2012; 11:30	China	3–0	Ukraine

Report	Individual matches
Yang Qian	3–0	Yuliya Klymenko	11–1, 11–3, 11–6
Liu Meili	3–0	Antonina Khodzynska	11–4, 11–2, 11–4
Yang Qian	3–0	Antonina Khodzynska	11–1, 11–3, 11–4

6 September 2012; 11:30	Australia	2–3	France

Report	Individual matches
Rebecca McDonnell	0–3	Claire Mairie	9–11, 2–11, 5–11
Melissa Tapper	3–2	Audrey le Morvan	8–11, 11–6, 11–8, 10–12, 11–4
Melissa Tapper	3–0	Claire Mairie	11–3, 11–2, 11–8
Rebecca McDonnell	0–3	Audrey le Morvan	2–11, 0–11, 5–11
Rebecca McDonnell / Melissa Tapper	0–3	Claire Mairie / Audrey le Morvan	5–11, 5–11, 9–11

6 September 2012; 11:30	Turkey	3–2	Russia

Report	Individual matches
Ümran Ertiş	2–3	Olga Gorshkaleva	11–5, 6–11, 11–2, 9–11, 4–11
Neslihan Kavas	3–0	Yulia Ovsyannikova	11–5, 11–7, 11–7
Neslihan Kavas	1–3	Olga Gorshkaleva	11–4, 5–11, 6–11, 8–11
Ümran Ertiş	3–0	Yulia Ovsyannikova	11–6, 11–7, 11–6
Ümran Ertiş / Neslihan Kavas	3–1	Olga Gorshkaleva / Yulia Ovsyannikova	11–2, 7–11, 11–9, 11–6

6 September 2012; 11:30	Brazil	1–3	Poland

Report	Individual matches
Bruna Alexandre	3–1	Karolina Pek	11–8, 11–9, 8–11, 11–5
Jane Rodrigues	0–3	Natalia Partyka	4–11, 3–11, 2–11
Bruna Alexandre	0–3	Natalia Partyka	3–11, 3–11, 0–11
Jane Rodrigues	0–3	Karolina Pek	5–11, 7–11, 6–11

=== Semifinals ===
6 September 2012; 19:00	China	3–0	France

Report	Individual matches
Fan Lei	3–0	Claire Mairie	11–3, 11–3, 11–5
Lei Lina	3–0	Audrey le Morvan	11–5, 11–1, 11–6
Lei Lina	3–0	Claire Mairie	11–4, 11–2, 11–4

6 September 2012; 19:00	Turkey	3–2	Poland

Report	Individual matches
Neslihan Kavas	3–1	Malgorzata Jankowska	11–8, 6–11, 14–12, 11–9
Ümran Ertiş	0–3	Natalia Partyka	8–11, 2–11, 4–11
Neslihan Kavas	0–3	Natalia Partyka	4–11, 8–11, 5–11
Ümran Ertiş	3–1	Malgorzata Jankowska	11–8, 8–11, 11–6, 11–8
Neslihan Kavas / Ümran Ertiş	3–2	Malgorzata Jankowska / Natalia Partyka	11–7, 11–4, 3–11, 7–11, 15–13

=== Finals ===
Gold medal match

8 September 2012; 10:00	China	3–0	Turkey

Report	Individual matches
Lei Lina	3–0	Kübra Öçsoy	11–4, 11–5, 11–7
Fan Lei	3–2	Neslihan Kavas	7–11, 11–7, 11–5, 9–11, 11–4
Lei Ling	3–0	Neslihan Kavas	11–7, 11–3, 11–6

Bronze medal match

8 September 2012; 10:00	France	2–3	Poland

Report	Individual matches
Claire Mairie	0–3	Natalia Partyka	4–11, 2–11, 9–11
Audrey le Morvan	3–0	Alicja Eigner	11–5, 11–5, 11–2
Audrey le Morvan	0–3	Natalia Partyka	9–11, 5–11, 5–11
Claire Mairie	3–0	Alicja Eigner	11–8, 11–5, 12–10
Claire Mairie / Audrey le Morvan	0–3	Malgorzata Jankowska / Natalia Partyka	7–11, 3–11, 5–11
