= Table tennis at the 2012 Summer Paralympics – Women's individual – Class 9 =

Table Tennis tournament for women's at the 2012 Summer Paralympics

Table tennis Women's C9 at the XIV Paralympic Games
- Venue: ExCeL Exhibition Centre
- Dates: 30 August – 3 September 2012
- Competitors: 8 from 5 nations

Medalists
1st place, gold medalist(s)		Lei Lina	China
2nd place, silver medalist(s)		Neslihan Kavas	Turkey
3rd place, bronze medalist(s)		Liu Meili	China

The Women's individual table tennis – Class 9 tournament at the 2012 Summer Paralympics in London took place from 30 August to 3 September 2012 at ExCeL Exhibition Centre. Classes 6–10 were for athletes with a physical impairment who competed from a standing position; the lower the number, the greater the impact the impairment was on an athlete's ability to compete.

In the preliminary stage, athletes competed in two groups of four. Top two in each group qualified for the semi-finals.

== Results ==
All times are local (BST/UTC+1)

=== Finals ===
Semifinals: 1 Sep 17:30
A1	Lei Lina (CHN)	11	11	11
B2	Claire Mairie (FRA)	6	5	4
A2	Neslihan Kavas (TUR)	7	11	11	9	11
B1	Liu Meili (CHN)	11	9	8	11	6

Gold medal match: 3 Sep 18:00
A1	Lei Lina (CHN)	11	8	7	11	11
A2	Neslihan Kavas (TUR)	8	11	11	5	7
Bronze medal match
B2	Claire Mairie (FRA)	8	2	17	6
B1	Liu Meili (CHN)	11	11	15	11

=== Preliminary round ===
Qualified for the semifinals

==== Group A ====
Athlete	Won	Lost	Games won	Points diff
Lei Lina (CHN)	3	0	9	+46
Neslihan Kavas (TUR)	2	1	6	-9
Liu Meng (CHN)	1	2	3	-16
Karolina Pek (POL)	0	3	4	-23

30 August, 11:00

Liu Meng (CHN)	7	5	5
Lei Lina (CHN)	11	11	11

30 August, 11:00

Neslihan Kavas (TUR)	4	12	11	7	11
Karolina Pek (POL)	11	10	5	11	9

31 August, 09:00

Karolina Pek (POL)	11	11	6	4	8
Liu Meng (CHN)	8	8	11	11	11

31 August, 09:00

Neslihan Kavas (TUR)	9	5	4
Lei Lina (CHN)	11	11	11

31 August, 17:20

Lei Lina (CHN)	11	11	11
Karolina Pek (POL)	4	9	5

31 August, 17:20

Neslihan Kavas (TUR)	11	12	11
Liu Meng (CHN)	7	10	8

==== Group B ====
Athlete	Won	Lost	Games won	Points diff
Liu Meili (CHN)	2	1	6	+13
Claire Mairie (FRA)	2	1	6	+7
Olga Gorshkaleva (RUS)	1	2	6	-1
Malgorzata Jankowska (POL)	1	2	3	-19

30 August, 11:00

Malgorzata Jankowska (POL)	8	9	9
Liu Meili (CHN)	11	11	11

30 August, 11:00

Olga Gorshkaleva (RUS)	6	11	6	7
Claire Mairie (FRA)	11	7	11	11

31 August, 09:40

Claire Mairie (FRA)	11	11	11
Malgorzata Jankowska (POL)	8	8	5

31 August, 09:40

Olga Gorshkaleva (RUS)	14	11	11
Liu Meili (CHN)	12	6	9

31 August, 17:20

Liu Meili (CHN)	11	11	11
Claire Mairie (FRA)	7	5	6

31 August, 17:20

Olga Gorshkaleva (RUS)	14	11	14	8	9
Malgorzata Jankowska (POL)	12	6	16	11	11
