= Table tennis at the 2004 Summer Paralympics – Women's individual – Class 10 =

Table Tennis - Women's Singles 10 at the XII Paralympic Games
- Paralympic Table Tennis
- Venue: Galatsi Olympic Hall
- Dates: 18–21 September 2004
- Competitors: 8 from 5 nations

Medalists
1st place, gold medalist(s)		Natalia Partyka	Poland
2nd place, silver medalist(s)		Jolana Matouskova	Czech Republic
3rd place, bronze medalist(s)		Li Yu Qiang	China

The Women's Singles 10 table tennis competition at the 2004 Summer Paralympics was held from 18 to 21 September at the Galatsi Olympic Hall.

Classes 6–10 were for athletes with a physical impairment who competed from a standing position; the lower the number, the greater the impact the impairment had on an athlete's ability to compete.

The event was won by Natalia Partyka, representing Poland.

== Results ==
=== Preliminaries ===
Qualified for final round

==== Group A ====
Rank	Competitor	MP	W	L	Points	POL	JPN	CZE	FRA
1	Natalia Partyka (POL)	3	3	0	9:0	x	3:0	3:0	3:0
2	Yasuko Kudo (JPN)	3	2	1	6:4	0:3	x	3:0	3:1
3	Michala Zakova (CZE)	3	1	2	3:8	0:3	0:3	x	3:2
4	Audrey le Morvan (FRA)	3	0	3	3:9	0:3	1:3	2:3	x

==== Group B ====
Rank	Competitor	MP	W	L	Points	CZE	CHN	POL	FRA
1	Jolana Matouskova (CZE)	2	2	0	6:1	x	3:1	3:0	W/O
2	Li Yu Qiang (CHN)	3	2	1	7:5	1:3	x	3:2	3:0
3	Krystyna Jagodzinska (POL)	3	1	2	5:7	0:3	2:3	x	3:1
4	Michelle Sevin (FRA)	2	0	2	1:6	DNS	0:3	1:3	x

=== Competition bracket ===
Semi-finals
Natalia Partyka (POL)	3
Li Yu Qiang (CHN)	0
Yasuko Kudo (JPN)	2
Jolana Matouskova (CZE)	3

Final
Natalia Partyka (POL)	3
Jolana Matouskova (CZE)	0
Third place
Li Yu Qiang (CHN)	3
Yasuko Kudo (JPN)	2
