= Table tennis at the 2008 Summer Paralympics – Women's team – Class 6–10 =

Women's Team Class 6–10 at the XIII Paralympic Games
- Venue: Peking University Gymnasium
- Dates: 13 – 16 September 2008
- Competitors: 10

Medalists
1st place, gold medalist(s)		Hou Chunxiao; Fan Lei; Liu Meili; Lei Lina	China
2nd place, silver medalist(s)		Malgorzata Grzelak; Natalia Partyka	Poland
3rd place, bronze medalist(s)		Anne Barneoud; Audrey le Morvan; Claire Mairie; Thu Kamkasomphou	France

The Women's Team Class 6–10 table tennis competition at the 2008 Summer Paralympics was held between 13 September and 16 September at the Peking University Gymnasium. Classes 6–10 were for athletes with a physical impairment who competed from a standing position; the lower the number, the greater the impact the impairment had on an athlete's ability to compete.

The competition was a straight knock-out format. Each tie was decided by the best of a potential five matches, two singles, a doubles (not necessarily the same players) and two reverse singles.

The event was won by the team representing China.

== Competition bracket ==
Round of 16
Egypt	1
Czech Republic	3
Ukraine	3
Australia	0

Quarterfinals
Poland	3
Czech Republic	0
Russia	3
Sweden	1
France	3
Brazil	0
Ukraine	0
China	3

Semifinals
Poland	3
Russia	0
France	0
China	3

Final
Poland	1
China	3
Third place
Russia	0
France	3

== First round ==
13 September 2008; 16:30	Egypt	1–3	Czech Republic

Report	Individual matches
Faiza Mahmoud Afify	3–0	Jaroslava Janeckova	11–6, 11–7, 11–8
Angham Medhat Maghraby	0–3	Michala la Bourdonnaye	4–11, 6–11, 7–11
Faiza Mahmoud Afify / Angham Medhat Maghraby	1–3	Jaroslava Janeckova / Michala la Bourdonnaye	11–8, 1–11, 5–11, 8–11
Faiza Mahmoud Afify	0–3	Michala la Bourdonnaye	3–11, 5–11, 2–11

13 September 2008; 16:30	Ukraine	3–0	Australia

Report	Individual matches
Viktoriia Safonova	3–0	Sarah Lazzaro	11–3, 11–4, 11–3
Antonina Khodzynska	3–0	Rebecca Julian	11–4, 11–7, 11–7
Yuliya Klymenko / Viktoriia Safonova	3–0	Sarah Lazzaro / Rebecca Julian	11–9, 11–8, 11–6

== Quarter-finals ==
14 September 2008; 10:00	Poland	3–0	Czech Republic

Report	Individual matches
Malgorzata Grzelak	3–0	Jaroslava Janeckova	11–3, 11–7, 11–9
Natalia Partyka	3–0	Michala la Bourdonnaye	11–5, 11–7, 11–6
Malgorzata Grzelak / Natalia Partyka	3–0	Jaroslava Janeckova / Michala la Bourdonnaye	11–8, 11–9, 11–3

14 September 2008; 10:00	Russia	3–1	Sweden

Report	Individual matches
Olga Komleva	3–2	Josefin Abrahamsson	9–11, 11–6, 11–7, 9–11, 11–3
Inna Karmayeva	3–1	Marleen Bengtsson	15–17, 11–5, 11–7, 11–6
Olga Komleva / Yulia Ovsyannikova	1–3	Josefin Abrahamsson / Marleen Bengtsson	9–11, 9–11, 11–5, 13–15
Olga Komleva	3–2	Marleen Bengtsson	10–12, 9–11, 11–3, 11–8, 11–4

14 September 2008; 10:00	France	3–0	Brazil

Report	Individual matches
Thu Kamkasomphou	3–1	Jane Karla Rodrigues	11–6, 10–12, 11–7, 11–7
Audrey le Morvan	3–1	Carollina Maldonado	11–4, 9–11, 11–9, 11–5
Thu Kamkasomphou / Claire Mairie	3–0	Jane Karla Rodrigues / Carollina Maldonado	11–9, 11–3, 11–7

14 September 2008; 10:00	China	3–0	Ukraine

Report	Individual matches
Liu Meili	3–0	Yuliya Klymenko	11–6, 11–8, 11–1
Hou Chunxiao	3–1	Viktoriia Safonova	9–11, 11–3, 11–6, 11–4
Fan Lei / Lei Lina	3–0	Yuliya Klymenko / Viktoriia Safonova	11–7, 11–3, 11–3

== Semi-finals ==
14 September 2008; 16:30	Poland	3–0	Russia

Report	Individual matches
Natalia Partyka	3–0	Yulia Ovsyannikova	11–3, 11–5, 11–4
Malgorzata Grzelak	3–2	Natalia Martyasheva	9–11, 11–5, 8–11, 11–7, 11–7
Natalia Partyka / Malgorzata Grzelak	3–0	Yulia Ovsyannikova / Olga Komleva	11–5, 11–4, 11–4

14 September 2008; 16:30	China	3–0	France

Report	Individual matches
Fan Lei	3–0	Claire Mairie	11–9, 11–5, 11–5
Lei Lina	3–0	Thu Kamkasomphou	11–2, 11–7, 11–5
Fan Lei / Lei Lina	3–0	Claire Mairie / Thu Kamkasomphou	13–11, 11–4, 11–5

== Finals ==
Gold medal match

15 September 2008; 12:30	Poland	1–3	China

Report	Individual matches
Natalia Partyka	3–2	Lei Lina	12–10, 4–11, 11–8, 11–13, 11–7
Malgorzata Grzelak	0–3	Fan Lei	5–11, 9–11, 7–11
Malgorzata Grzelak / Natalia Partyka	0–3	Lei Lina / Fan Lei	4–11, 7–11, 5–11
Natalia Partyka	2–3	Fan Lei	10–12, 9–11, 11–4, 11–9, 6–11

Bronze medal match

15 September 2008; 12:30	France	3–0	Russia

Report	Individual matches
Thu Kamkasomphou	3–0	Inna Karmayeva	11–8, 14–12, 11–5
Audrey le Morvan	3–0	Olga Komleva	11–6, 11–9, 11–6
Thu Kamkasomphou / Claire Mairie	3–1	Olga Komleva / Yulia Ovsyannikova	5–11, 11–9, 15–13, 11–4

== Team Lists ==
China; Hou Chunxiao; Fan Lei; Liu Meili; Lei Lina	Poland; Malgorzata Grzelak; Natalia Partyka	France; Anne Barneoud; Audrey le Morvan; Claire Mairie; Thu Kamkasomphou	Russia; Inna Karmayeva; Olga Komleva; Yulia Ovsyannikova; Natalia Martyasheva
Egypt; Faiza Mahmoud Afify; Angham Medhat Maghraby	Czech Republic; Jaroslava Janeckova; Michala la Bourdonnaye	Ukraine; Yuliya Klymenko; Antonina Khodzynska; Viktoriia Safonova	Australia; Sarah Lazzaro; Rebecca Julian
Sweden; Josefin Abrahamsson; Marleen Bengtsson	Brazil; Jane Karla Rodrigues; Carollina Maldonado		
