= Table tennis at the 2004 Summer Paralympics – Women's individual – Class 9 =

Table Tennis - Women's Singles 9 at the XII Paralympic Games
- Paralympic Table Tennis
- Venue: Galatsi Olympic Hall
- Dates: 18–21 September 2004
- Competitors: 8 from 6 nations

Medalists
1st place, gold medalist(s)		Liu Mei Li	China
2nd place, silver medalist(s)		Lei Lina	China
3rd place, bronze medalist(s)		Thu Kamkasomphou	France

The Women's Singles 9 table tennis competition at the 2004 Summer Paralympics was held from 18 to 21 September at the Galatsi Olympic Hall.

Classes 6–10 were for athletes with a physical impairment who competed from a standing position; the lower the number, the greater the impact the impairment had on an athlete's ability to compete.

The event was won by Liu Mei Li, representing China.

== Results ==
=== Preliminaries ===
Qualified for final round

==== Group A ====
Rank	Competitor	MP	W	L	Points	CHN	FRA	POL	BEL
1	Liu Mei Li (CHN)	3	3	0	9:0	x	3:0	3:0	3:0
2	Thu Kamkasomphou (FRA)	3	2	1	6:4	0:3	x	3:0	3:1
3	Małgorzata Grzelak (POL)	3	1	2	3:6	0:3	0:3	x	3:0
4	Myriam Muylaert (BEL)	3	0	3	1:9	0:3	1:3	0:3	x

==== Group B ====
Rank	Competitor	MP	W	L	Points	CHN	RUS	TUR	FRA
1	Lei Lina (CHN)	2	2	0	6:2	x	3:1	3:1	W/O
2	Olga Komleva (RUS)	3	2	1	7:5	1:3	x	3:2	3:0
3	Neslihan Kavas (TUR)	3	1	2	6:7	1:3	2:3	x	3:1
4	Claire Mairie (FRA)	2	0	2	1:6	DNS	0:3	1:3	x

=== Competition bracket ===
Semi-finals
Liu Mei Li (CHN)	3
Olga Komleva (RUS)	0
Thu Kamkasomphou (FRA)	2
Lei Lina (CHN)	3

Final
Liu Mei Li (CHN)	3
Lei Lina (CHN)	2
Third place
Olga Komleva (RUS)	2
Thu Kamkasomphou (FRA)	3
