= Table tennis at the 2012 Summer Paralympics – Women's individual – Class 8 =

Table tennis Women's C8 at the XIV Paralympic Games
- Venue: ExCeL Exhibition Centre
- Dates: 30 August – 2 September 2012
- Competitors: 8 from 7 nations

Medalists
1st place, gold medalist(s)		Mao Jingdian	China
2nd place, silver medalist(s)		Thu Kamkasomphou	France
3rd place, bronze medalist(s)		Josefin Abrahamsson	Sweden

The Women's individual table tennis - Class 8 tournament at the 2012 Summer Paralympics in London took place from 30 August to 3 September 2012 at ExCeL London. Classes 6–10 were for athletes with a physical impairment who competed from a standing position; the lower the number, the greater the impact the impairment was on an athlete’s ability to compete.

In the preliminary stage, athletes competed in two groups of four. Top two in each group qualified for the semi-finals.

== Results ==
All times are local (BST/UTC+1)

=== Finals ===
Semifinals: 1 Sep 16:45
A1	Thu Kamkasomphou (FRA)	11	11	11
B2	Josephine Medina (PHI)	3	3	8
A2	Josefin Abrahamsson (SWE)	11	2	4
B1	Mao Jingdian (CHN)	13	11	11

Gold medal match: 2 Sep 18:45
A1	Thu Kamkasomphou (FRA)	2	4	14	5
B1	Mao Jingdian (CHN)	11	11	12	11
Bronze medal match
B2	Josephine Medina (PHI)	9	10	11
A2	Josefin Abrahamsson (SWE)	11	12	13

=== Preliminary round ===
Qualified for the semifinals

==== Group A ====
Athlete	Won	Lost	Games won	Points diff
Thu Kamkasomphou (FRA)	3	0	9	+42
Josefin Abrahamsson (SWE)	2	1	6	-1
Yu Hailian (CHN)	1	2	6	0
Eman Mahmoud (EGY)	0	3	1	-41

30 August, 09:40

Yu Hailian (CHN)	11	11	11
Eman Mahmoud (EGY)	5	6	7

30 August, 09:40

Josefin Abrahamsson (SWE)	5	5	6
Thu Kamkasomphou (FRA)	11	11	11

30 August, 18:40

Yu Hailian (CHN)	8	11	6	7
Thu Kamkasomphou (FRA)	11	9	11	11

30 August, 18:40

Eman Mahmoud (EGY)	11	7	4	9
Josefin Abrahamsson (SWE)	9	11	11	11

31 August, 16:00

Yu Hailian (CHN)	1	9	11	11	8
Josefin Abrahamsson (SWE)	11	11	4	8	11

31 August, 16:00

Thu Kamkasomphou (FRA)	11	12	11
Eman Mahmoud (EGY)	4	10	5

==== Group B ====
Athlete	Won	Lost	Games won	Points diff
Mao Jingdian (CHN)	3	0	9	+34
Josephine Medina (PHI)	2	1	6	+7
Aida Dahlen (NOR)	1	2	4	-2
Jane Rodrigues (BRA)	0	3	0	-39

30 August, 09:40

Aida Dahlen (NOR)	11	11	11
Jane Rodrigues (BRA)	8	4	7

30 August, 09:40

Josephine Medina (PHI)	7	6	9
Mao Jingdian (CHN)	11	11	11

30 August, 19:20

Jane Rodrigues (BRA)	4	6	9
Josephine Medina (PHI)	11	11	11

30 August, 19:20

Aida Dahlen (NOR)	5	8	8
Mao Jingdian (CHN)	11	11	11

31 August, 16:00

Mao Jingdian (CHN)	11	11	12
Jane Rodrigues (BRA)	8	5	10

31 August, 16:00

Aida Dahlen (NOR)	11	11	7	5
Josephine Medina (PHI)	13	3	11	11
