= Table tennis at the 2008 Summer Paralympics – Women's individual – Class 10 =

Women's Individual Class 10 at the XIII Paralympic Games
- Venue: Peking University Gymnasium
- Dates: 7 – 11 September 2008
- Competitors: 8 from 6 nations

Medalists
1st place, gold medalist(s)		Natalia Partyka	Poland
2nd place, silver medalist(s)		Fan Lei	China
3rd place, bronze medalist(s)		Hou Chunxiao	China

The Women's Individual Class 10 table tennis competition at the 2008 Summer Paralympics was held between 7 September and 11 September at the Peking University Gymnasium.

Classes 6–10 were for athletes with a physical impairment who competed from a standing position; the lower the number, the greater the impact the impairment had on an athlete’s ability to compete.

The event was won by Natalia Partyka, representing Poland.

== Results ==
=== Preliminary round ===
Qualified for the knock-out stages

==== Group A ====
Rank	Competitor	MP	W	L	Points	POL	CHN	CHN	FRA
1	Natalia Partyka (POL)	3	3	0	9:0	x	3:0	3:0	3:0
2	Hou Chunxiao (CHN)	3	1	2	5:7	0:3	x	2:3	3:1
3	Li Yuqiang (CHN)	3	1	2	5:8	0:3	3:2	x	2:3
4	Audrey le Morvan (FRA)	3	1	2	4:8	0:3	1:3	3:2	x

7 September, 14:00

Li Yuqiang (CHN)	7	12	11	11	11
Hou Chunxiao (CHN)	11	14	9	8	8
Natalia Partyka (POL)	11	11	11		
Audrey le Morvan (FRA)	6	3	5		

8 September, 10:40

Natalia Partyka (POL)	11	11	11		
Hou Chunxiao (CHN)	6	1	9		
Audrey le Morvan (FRA)	11	11	10	7	11
Li Yuqiang (CHN)	9	7	12	11	6

8 September, 18:00

Natalia Partyka (POL)	11	11	11	
Li Yuqiang (CHN)	4	5	6	
Hou Chunxiao (CHN)	8	11	11	11
Audrey le Morvan (FRA)	11	3	8	7

==== Group B ====
Rank	Competitor	MP	W	L	Points	CHN	CZE	RUS	EGY
1	Fan Lei (CHN)	3	3	0	9:0	x	3:0	3:0	3:0
2	Michala la Bourdonnaye (CZE)	3	2	1	6:3	0:3	x	3:0	3:0
3	Inna Karmayeva (RUS)	3	1	2	3:6	0:3	0:3	x	3:0
4	Angham Medhat Maghraby (EGY)	3	0	3	0:9	0:3	0:3	0:3	x

7 September, 14:00

Fan Lei (CHN)	11	11	11
Inna Karmayeva (RUS)	3	4	4
Michala la Bourdonnaye (CZE)	11	11	11
Angham Medhat Maghraby (EGY)	7	8	4

8 September, 10:40

Inna Karmayeva (RUS)	11	11	11
Angham Medhat Maghraby (EGY)	7	9	6
Fan Lei (CHN)	11	11	11
Michala la Bourdonnaye (CZE)	2	6	7

8 September, 18:00

Fan Lei (CHN)	11	11	11
Angham Medhat Maghraby (EGY)	6	8	4
Michala la Bourdonnaye (CZE)	11	11	11
Inna Karmayeva (RUS)	4	8	3

=== Competition bracket ===
Semifinals: 10 Sep 10:00
Natalia Partyka (POL)	11	11	11
Michala la Bourdonnaye (CZE)	3	2	4
Hou Chunxiao (CHN)	6	16	9	9
Fan Lei (CHN)	11	14	11	11

Gold medal match: 10 Sep 19:00
Natalia Partyka (POL)	11	11	11
Fan Lei (CHN)	8	4	9
Bronze medal match: 10 Sep 19:00
Michala la Bourdonnaye (CZE)	4	5	6
Hou Chunxiao (CHN)	11	11	11
