= Table tennis at the 2008 Summer Paralympics – Women's individual – Class 9 =

Women's Individual Class 9 at the XIII Paralympic Games
- Venue: Peking University Gymnasium
- Dates: 7 – 11 September 2008
- Competitors: 8 from 7 nations

Medalists
1st place, gold medalist(s)		Lei Lina	China
2nd place, silver medalist(s)		Liu Meili	China
3rd place, bronze medalist(s)		Neslihan Kavas	Turkey

The Women's Individual Class 9 table tennis competition at the 2008 Summer Paralympics was held between 7 September and 11 September at the Peking University Gymnasium.

Classes 6–10 were for athletes with a physical impairment who competed from a standing position; the lower the number, the greater the impact the impairment had on an athlete’s ability to compete.

The event was won by Lei Lina, representing China.

== Results ==
=== Preliminary round ===
Qualified for the knock-out stages

==== Group A ====
Rank	Competitor	MP	W	L	Points	CHN	TUR	BRA	SLO
1	Lei Lina (CHN)	3	3	0	9:0	x	3:0	3:0	3:0
2	Neslihan Kavas (TUR)	3	2	1	6:3	0:3	x	3:0	3:0
3	Carollina Maldonado (BRA)	3	1	2	3:7	0:3	0:3	x	3:1
4	Jolanda Belavic (SLO)	3	0	3	1:9	0:3	0:3	1:3	x

7 September, 14:00

Lei Lina (CHN)	11	11	11
Carollina Maldonado (BRA)	4	3	5
Neslihan Kavas (TUR)	11	11	11
Jolanda Belavic (SLO)	1	8	7

8 September, 10:40

Carollina Maldonado (BRA)	5	11	11	11
Jolanda Belavic (SLO)	11	9	3	5
Lei Lina (CHN)	11	11	12	
Neslihan Kavas (TUR)	8	6	10	

8 September, 18:00

Lei Lina (CHN)	11	11	11
Jolanda Belavic (SLO)	2	3	6
Neslihan Kavas (TUR)	11	11	11
Carollina Maldonado (BRA)	9	2	6

==== Group B ====
Rank	Competitor	MP	W	L	Points	CHN	POL	RUS	AUS
1	Liu Meili (CHN)	3	3	0	9:0	x	3:0	3:0	3:0
2	Malgorzata Grzelak (POL)	3	2	1	6:4	0:3	x	3:1	3:0
3	Olga Komleva (RUS)	3	1	2	4:6	0:3	1:3	x	3:0
4	Sarah Lazzaro (AUS)	3	0	3	0:9	0:3	0:3	0:3	x

7 September, 14:00

Malgorzata Grzelak (POL)	10	11	11	11
Olga Komleva (RUS)	12	6	4	7
Liu Meili (CHN)	11	11	11	
Sarah Lazzaro (AUS)	7	7	4	

8 September, 10:40

Olga Komleva (RUS)	11	11	11
Sarah Lazzaro (AUS)	8	1	9
Liu Meili (CHN)	11	11	11
Malgorzata Grzelak (POL)	6	8	6

8 September, 18:00

Malgorzata Grzelak (POL)	11	11	11
Sarah Lazzaro (AUS)	4	9	6
Liu Meili (CHN)	12	12	11
Olga Komleva (RUS)	10	10	3

=== Competition bracket ===
Semifinals: 10 Sep 10:45
Lei Lina (CHN)	11	11	13
Malgorzata Grzelak (POL)	2	7	11
Neslihan Kavas (TUR)	5	8	11	3
Liu Meili (CHN)	11	11	5	11

Gold medal match: 11 Sep 10:00
Lei Lina (CHN)	12	11	11
Liu Meili (CHN)	10	8	8
Bronze medal match: 11 Sep 10:00
Malgorzata Grzelak (POL)	7	4	11
Neslihan Kavas (TUR)	11	11	13
