= Table tennis at the 2016 Summer Paralympics – Women's individual – Class 9 =

Table tennis at the XV Paralympic Games
- Venue: Riocentro Pavilion 3
- Dates: 8–12 September 2016
- Competitors: 8 from 5 nations

Medalists
1st place, gold medalist(s)		Liu Meng	China
2nd place, silver medalist(s)		Lei Lina	China
3rd place, bronze medalist(s)		Karolina Pek	Poland

The women's individual table tennis – Class 9 tournament at the 2016 Summer Paralympics in Rio de Janeiro took place during 8–12 September 2016 at Riocentro Pavilion 3. Classes 6–10 were for athletes with a physical impairment who competed from a standing position; the lower the number, the greater the impact the impairment was on an athlete’s ability to compete.

In the preliminary stage, athletes competed in two groups of four. Winners and runners-up of each group qualified to the semifinals.

== Results ==
=== Final round ===
Semifinals
A1	Lei Lina (CHN)	11	11	11
B2	Danielle Rauen (BRA)	1	5	8
A2	Liu Meng (CHN)	7	11	12	7	11
B1	Karolina Pek (POL)	11	6	10	11	9

Final
A1	Lei Lina (CHN)	10	11	11
A2	Liu Meng (CHN)	12	13	13
Bronze medal match
B2	Danielle Rauen (BRA)	11	11	9	5	5
B1	Karolina Pek (POL)	8	8	11	11	11

=== Preliminary rounds ===
Group A

Rank	Competitor	MP	W	L	Points	CHN	CHN	TUR	BRA
1	Lei Lina (CHN)	6	3	0	9:1	x	3:0	3:1	3:0
2	Liu Meng (CHN)	5	2	1	6:5	0:3	x	3:2	3:0
3	Neslihan Kavas (TUR)	4	1	2	6.3	1:3	2:3	x	3:0
4	Jennyfer Marques Parinos (BRA)	3	0	3	0:9	0:3	0:3	0:3	x

Group B

Rank	Competitor	MP	W	L	Points	POL	BRA	CHN	GER
1	Karolina Pek (POL)	6	3	0	9:3	x	3:2	3:1	3:0
2	Danielle Rauen (BRA)	5	2	1	7:5	1:3	x	3:2	3:0
3	Xiong Guiyan (CHN)	4	1	2	7:6	2:3	2:3	x	3:0
4	Lena Kramm (GER)	3	0	3	0:9	0:3	0:3	0:3	x
