= Table tennis at the 2012 Summer Paralympics – Women's individual – Class 10 =

Table tennis Women's C10 at the XIV Paralympic Games
- Venue: ExCeL Exhibition Centre
- Dates: 30 August – 3 September 2012
- Competitors: 8 from 5 nations

Medalists
1st place, gold medalist(s)		Natalia Partyka	Poland
2nd place, silver medalist(s)		Qian Yang	China
3rd place, bronze medalist(s)		Fan Lei	China

The Women's individual table tennis – Class 10 tournament at the 2012 Summer Paralympics in London took place from 30 August to 3 September 2012 at ExCeL Exhibition Centre.

In the preliminary stage, athletes competed in two groups of four. Top two in each group qualified for the semi-finals.

== Results ==
All times are local (BST/UTC+1)

=== Finals ===
Semifinals: 1 Sep 17:30
A1	Natalia Partyka (POL)	11	11	11
B2	Melissa Tapper (AUS)	9	2	4
A2	Yang Qian (CHN)	15	12	8	11
B1	Fan Lei (CHN)	13	10	11	7

Gold medal match: 3 Sep 19:30
A1	Natalia Partyka (POL)	11	11	11	7	11
A2	Yang Qian (CHN)	5	13	9	11	4
Bronze medal match
B2	Melissa Tapper (AUS)	11	11	5	6	7
B1	Fan Lei (CHN)	8	9	11	11	11

=== Preliminary round ===
Qualified for the semifinals

==== Group A ====
Athlete	Won	Lost	Games won	Points diff
Natalia Partyka (POL)	3	0	9	+61
Yang Qian (CHN)	2	1	6	+20
Umran Ertis (TUR)	1	2	3	-10
Angham Maghraby (EGY)	0	3	0	-71

30 August, 13:40

Yang Qian (CHN)	11	11	11
Angham Maghraby (EGY)	2	4	5

30 August, 13:40

Umran Ertis (TUR)	5	4	6
Natalia Partyka (POL)	11	11	11

31 August, 11:40

Yang Qian (CHN)	4	7	9
Natalia Partyka (POL)	11	11	11

31 August, 11:40

Angham Maghraby (EGY)	6	5	3
Umran Ertis (TUR)	11	11	11

1 September, 09:40

Yang Qian (CHN)	11	11	12
Umran Ertis (TUR)	5	8	10

1 September, 09:40

Natalia Partyka (POL)	11	11	11
Angham Maghraby (EGY)	1	1	1

==== Group B ====
Athlete	Won	Lost	Games won	Points diff
Fan Lei (CHN)	3	0	9	+34
Melissa Tapper (AUS)	2	1	6	+13
Bruna Alexandre (BRA)	1	2	7	-1
Audrey Le Morvan (FRA)	0	3	1	-46

30 August, 13:40

Melissa Tapper (AUS)	11	11	11
Audrey Le Morvan (FRA)	7	2	4

30 August, 13:40

Bruna Alexandre (BRA)	5	12	11	9	9
Fan Lei (CHN)	11	10	8	11	11

31 August, 11:40

Melissa Tapper (AUS)	7	6	6
Fan Lei (CHN)	11	11	11

31 August, 11:40

Audrey Le Morvan (FRA)	5	13	9	6
Bruna Alexandre (BRA)	11	11	11	11

1 September, 10:20

Melissa Tapper (AUS)	10	8	11	11	11
Bruna Alexandre (BRA)	12	11	5	7	9

1 September, 10:20

Fan Lei (CHN)	11	11	11
Audrey Le Morvan (FRA)	7	7	4
