= Ümran Ertiş =

Turkish para table tennis player

Personal information
- Nationality: Turkish
- Born: 13 April 1996 (age 30) Ankara, Turkey

Sport
- Country: Turkey
- Sport: Para table tennis
- Club: Diyanet Youth and Sport Club
- Coached by: Yusuf Kılınçkaya
Medal record
Women's table tennis (class 10)
Representing Turkey
Paralympic Games
Silver medal – second place	2012 London	Team class 6–10
European Championships
Gold medal – first place	2013 Italy	Individual
Islamic Solidarity Games
Gold medal – first place	2021 Konya	Team
Bronze medal – third place	2021 Konya	Individual
- Updated on 4 October 2013

Ümran Ertiş (born 13 April 1996 in Ankara, Turkey) is a Turkish female para table tennis player of class 10 and Paralympian.

== Career ==
Ertiş took part at the 2012 Summer Paralympics. She competed at the women's individual class 10 event, where she could not advance to the quarterfinals after winning one game and losing two. In the event of women's team class 6–10, she advanced to the final along with Neslihan Kavas.

She won the gold medal in the women's single class 10 division at the 2013 ITTF European Para-Table Tennis Championships held in Lignano, Italy.

== Achievements ==
Year	Competition	Venue	Position	Notes
Representing Turkey
2007	IPC European Championship	Slovakia	3rd	team
2009	IPC European Championship	Italy	2nd	individual
2009	IPC European Championship	Italy	3rd	team
2009	International tournament	Slovenia	2nd	
2009	International tournament	Hungary	2nd	individual
2009	International tournament	Hungary	2nd	team
2010	International tournament	France	3rd	individual
2010	International tournament	France	1st	team
2010	2010 IPC World Championship	South Korea	3rd	individual
2010	2010 IPC World Championship	South Korea	2nd	team
2011	IPC European Championships	Croatia	2nd	individual
2011	IPC European Championships	Croatia	1st	team
2011	International tournament	Slovenia	3rd	individual
2011	International tournament	Slovenia	3rd	team
2012	Summer Paralympics	London, United Kingdom	2nd	team
2013	ITTF European Championships	Lignano, Italy	1st	individual
