= Table tennis at the 2020 Summer Paralympics – Women's individual – Class 9 =

Table tennis at the XVI Paralympic Games
- Venue: Tokyo Metropolitan Gymnasium
- Dates: 25–30 August 2021
- Competitors: 8 from 7 nations

Medalists
1st place, gold medalist(s)		Lei Lina	Australia
2nd place, silver medalist(s)		Xiong Guiyan	China
3rd place, bronze medalist(s)		Karolina Pęk	Poland
3rd place, bronze medalist(s)		Alexa Szvitacs	Hungary

The Women's individual table tennis – Class 9 tournament at the 2020 Summer Paralympics in Tokyo took place between 25 and 30 August 2021 at Tokyo Metropolitan Gymnasium. Classes 6–10 were for athletes with a physical impairment in their upper body, and who competed in a standing position. The lower the number, the greater the impact the impairment was on an athlete's ability to compete.

In the preliminary stage, athletes competed in 2 groups of four. Winners and runners-up of each group qualified for the semifinals. In this edition of the Games, no bronze medal match was held. Losers of each semifinal were automatically awarded a bronze medal.

== Qualification ==
Adapted from list released by the International Table Tennis Federation on 12 July 2021.

Qualification Pathway		Slot(s)	Qualified Athlete(s)
Regional Para Championships	American	1	Danielle Rauen (BRA)
Regional Para Championships	Asian	1	Xiong Guiyan (CHN)
Regional Para Championships	European	1	Alexa Szvitacs (HUN)
Regional Para Championships	Oceania	1	Lei Lina (AUS)
World Ranking Allocation		2	Karolina Pęk (POL); Neslihan Kavas (TUR)
World Qualification Tournament		1	Jennyfer Marques Parinos (BRA)
Bipartite Commission Invitation		1	Kim Kun-hea (KOR)
Total		8	

== Schedule ==
Legend
P	Preliminary round	¼	Quarter-finals	½	Semi-finals	F	Final

Wed 25	Thu 26	Fri 27	Sat 28	Sun 29	Mon 30
P			½		F

== Seeding ==
The total 8 players were seeded by world ranking as of August 2021.

1. Xiong Guiyan (CHN)
2. Karolina Pęk (POL)
3. Alexa Szvitacs (HUN)
4. Lei Lina (AUS)
5. Neslihan Kavas (TUR)
6. Kim Kun-hea (KOR)
7. Danielle Rauen (BRA)
8. Jennyfer Marques Parinos (BRA)

== Results ==
All times are local time in UTC+9.

=== Main bracket ===
==== Final rounds ====
Semifinals							Gold medal match
A1	Xiong Guiyan (CHN)	11	8	11	11
B2	Karolina Pęk (POL) (bronze)	8	11	7	7		A1	Xiong Guiyan (CHN) (silver)	11	5	5	11	5
A2	Alexa Szvitacs (HUN) (bronze)	14	13	5	8	6	B1	Lei Lina (AUS) (gold)	6	11	11	9	11
B1	Lei Lina (AUS)	12	11	11	11	11

=== Preliminary round ===
Qualified for the knock-out stage

==== Group A ====
Seed	Athlete	Won	Lost	Points diff	Rank
1	Xiong Guiyan (CHN)	3	0	+50	1
3	Alexa Szvitacs (HUN)	2	1	+5	2
7	Danielle Rauen (BRA)	1	2	–17	3
5	Neslihan Kavas (TUR)	0	3	–38	4

Date	Time	Player 1	Score	Player 2	Set 1	Set 2	Set 3	Set 4	Set 5	Ref.
25 Aug	9:00	Neslihan Kavas (Turkey)	1–3	(China) Xiong Guiyan	11–9	4–11	6–11	5–11		Report
25 Aug	9:00	Alexa Szvitacs (Hungary)	3–1	(Brazil) Danielle Rauen	9–11	11–6	11–9	11–6		Report
25 Aug	20:00	Danielle Rauen (Brazil)	3–0	(Turkey) Neslihan Kavas	11–3	11–8	11–9			Report
25 Aug	20:00	Alexa Szvitacs (Hungary)	0–3	(China) Xiong Guiyan	5–11	6–11	8–11			Report
26 Aug	21:20	Alexa Szvitacs (Hungary)	3–0	(Turkey) Neslihan Kavas	11–9	11–6	14–12			Report
27 Aug	9:00	Xiong Guiyan (China)	3–0	(Brazil) Danielle Rauen	11–5	11–4	11–4			Report

==== Group B ====
Seed	Athlete	Won	Lost	Points diff	Rank
4	Lei Lina (AUS)	3	0	+37	1
2	Karolina Pęk (POL)	2	1	+16	2
6	Kim Kun-hea (KOR)	1	2	–11	3
8	Jennyfer Marques Parinos (BRA)	0	3	–42	4

Date	Time	Player 1	Score	Player 2	Set 1	Set 2	Set 3	Set 4	Set 5	Ref.
25 Aug	9:00	Kim Kun-hea (South Korea)	1–3	(Poland) Karolina Pęk	4–11	6–11	11–8	6–11		Report
25 Aug	9:00	Lei Lina (Australia)	3–0	(Brazil) Jennyfer Marques Parinos	11–4	11–8	11–4			Report
25 Aug	20:00	Jennyfer Marques Parinos (Brazil)	1–3	(South Korea) Kim Kun-hea	10–12	4–11	11–9	6–11		Report
25 Aug	20:00	Lei Lina (Australia)	3–1	(Poland) Karolina Pęk	11–6	9–11	11–5	12–10		Report
26 Aug	21:20	Karolina Pęk (Poland)	3–1	(Brazil) Jennyfer Marques Parinos	11–9	11–4	9–11	11–5		Report
26 Aug	21:20	Lei Lina (Australia)	3–1	(South Korea) Kim Kun-hea	7–11	11–9	11–4	11–7		Report
