= Jolana Matoušková =

Czech para table tennis player

Personal information
- Born: 25 October 1979 (age 46) Plzeň, Czechoslovakia

Sport
- Country: Czech Republic
- Sport: Para table tennis
- Disability class: C10
- Retired: 2004
Medal record
Para table tennis
Representing Czech Republic
Paralympic Games
Gold medal – first place	2000 Sydney	Women's singles C10
Silver medal – second place	1996 Atlanta	Women's singles C10
Silver medal – second place	1996 Atlanta	Women's teams C6-10
Silver medal – second place	2000 Sydney	Women's teams C6-10
Silver medal – second place	2004 Athens	Women's singles C10
World Championships
Gold medal – first place	1998 Paris	Women's open singles
Gold medal – first place	1998 Paris	Women's singles C10
Gold medal – first place	1998 Paris	Women's teams C6-10
Silver medal – second place	2002 Taipei	Women's singles C10
Silver medal – second place	2002 Taipei	Women's teams C10
European Championships
Gold medal – first place	1997 Stockholm	Women's open singles
Gold medal – first place	1997 Stockholm	Women's singles C10
Gold medal – first place	1997 Stockholm	Women's teams C10
Gold medal – first place	1999 Piešťany	Women's open singles
Gold medal – first place	1999 Piešťany	Women's singles C10
Gold medal – first place	1999 Piešťany	Women's doubles C6-10
Gold medal – first place	2001 Frankfurt	Women's singles C10
Silver medal – second place	1995 Hillerød	Women's teams C10
Silver medal – second place	1999 Piešťany	Women's teams C10
Silver medal – second place	2003 Zagreb	Women's singles C10
Silver medal – second place	2003 Zagreb	Women's teams C10
Bronze medal – third place	1995 Hillerød	Women's singles C10
Bronze medal – third place	2001 Frankfurt	Women's open singles

Jolana Matoušková (née Davidková, born 25 October 1979) is a Czech retired para table tennis player who competed in international level events. She is remembered as one of Czech Republic's most successful para table tennis player by winning five Paralympic medals, three-time World champion and seven-time European champion.

Matoušková narrowly missed defending her singles title in 2004 when she was defeated by Natalia Partyka who was her main rival during her sporting career.
