= Liu Meili =

Chinese para table tennis player

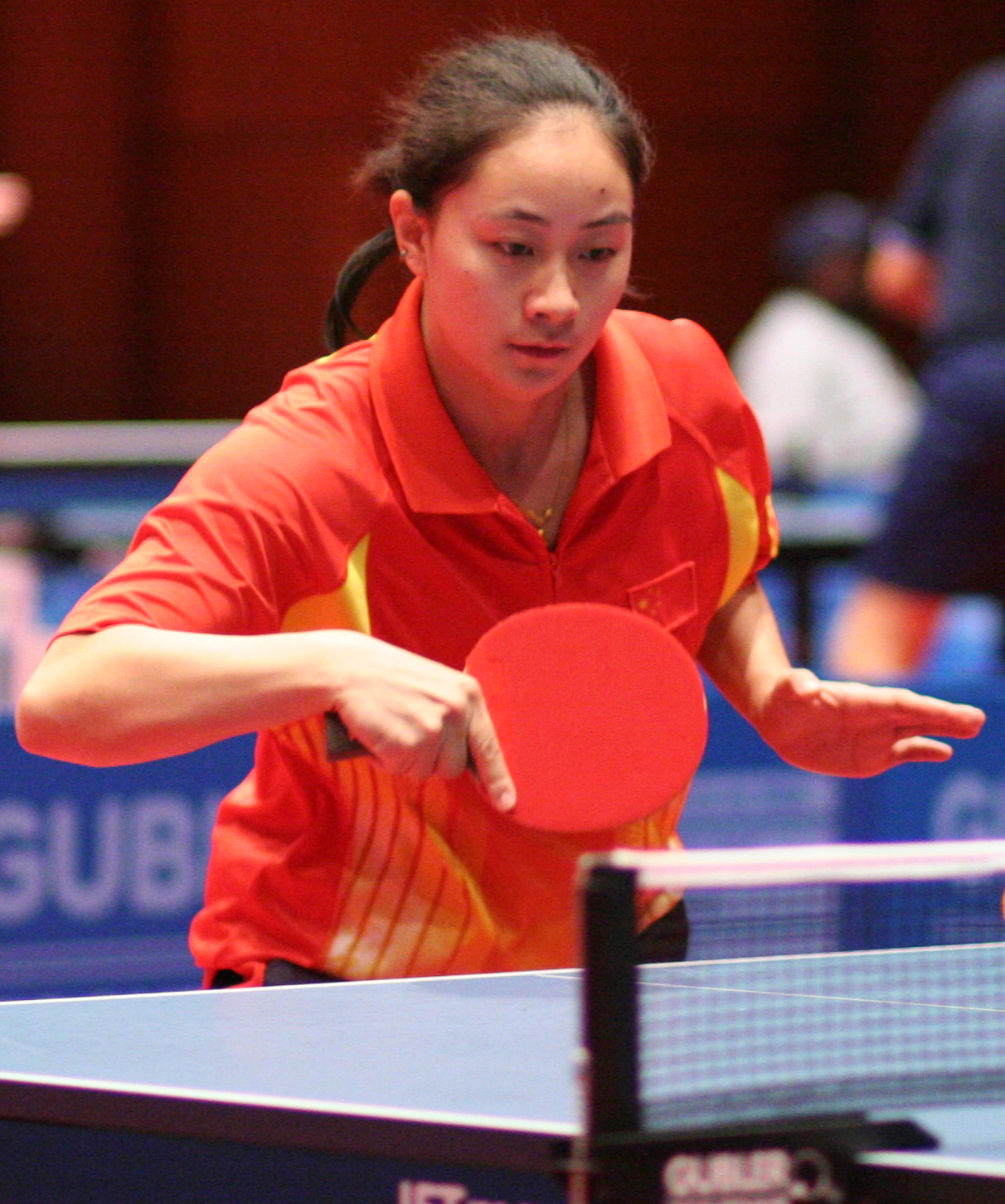
- Liu at the 2006 World Para Table Tennis Championships

Personal information
- Born: 27 June 1983 (age 43) Xiao County, Anhui, China

Sport
- Sport: Table tennis
- Playing style: Right-handed shakehand grip
- Disability class: 9
- Highest ranking: 1 (January 1999)
Medal record
Women's para table tennis
Representing China
Paralympic Games
Gold medal – first place	2000 Sydney	Teams C6–10
Gold medal – first place	2004 Athens	Singles C9
Gold medal – first place	2004 Athens	Teams C6–10
Gold medal – first place	2008 Beijing	Teams C6–10
Gold medal – first place	2012 London	Teams C6–10
Silver medal – second place	2000 Sydney	Singles C9
Silver medal – second place	2008 Beijing	Singles C9
Bronze medal – third place	2012 London	Singles C9
World Championships
Gold medal – first place	1998 Paris	Singles C9
Gold medal – first place	2002 Taipei	Singles C9
Gold medal – first place	2002 Taipei	Teams C6–9
Gold medal – first place	2006 Montreux	Teams C9–10
Gold medal – first place	2010 Gwangju	Teams C9–10
Silver medal – second place	1998 Paris	Open singles standing
Silver medal – second place	2002 Taipei	Open singles standing
Silver medal – second place	2010 Gwangju	Open singles standing
Bronze medal – third place	2006 Montreux	Singles C9
Bronze medal – third place	2006 Montreux	Open singles standing
Bronze medal – third place	2010 Gwangju	Singles C9
Asian Para Games
Gold medal – first place	2010 Guangzhou	Singles C9
Bronze medal – third place	2022 Hangzhou	Doubles C20
FESPIC Games
Gold medal – first place	1999 Bangkok	Singles C9–10
Gold medal – first place	1999 Bangkok	Open singles standing
Gold medal – first place	1999 Bangkok	Teams C6–10
Silver medal – second place	2002 Busan	Singles C7–10
Silver medal – second place	2002 Busan	Open singles standing
Asian and Oceanic Championships
Gold medal – first place	2009 Amman	Singles C9
Gold medal – first place	2009 Amman	Open singles standing
Gold medal – first place	2009 Amman	Teams C6–10
Gold medal – first place	2011 Hong Kong	Teams C6–10
Silver medal – second place	2007 Seoul	Singles C9
Silver medal – second place	2011 Hong Kong	Singles C9
Bronze medal – third place	2007 Seoul	Open singles standing
FESPIC Championships
Gold medal – first place	1997 Hong Kong	Singles C8–9
Gold medal – first place	1999 Taipei	Singles C9–10
Gold medal – first place	2001 Osaka	Open singles standing
Gold medal – first place	2001 Osaka	Teams C6–10
Silver medal – second place	1999 Taipei	Open singles standing
Silver medal – second place	2001 Osaka	Singles C6–10
Silver medal – second place	2003 Shanghai	Open singles standing
Bronze medal – third place	1997 Hong Kong	Open singles standing

Liu Meili
- Traditional Chinese: 劉美麗
- Simplified Chinese: 刘美丽
Transcriptions
Standard Mandarin
- Hanyu Pinyin: Liú Měilì

Liu Meili (Chinese: 刘美丽, born 27 June 1983) is a Chinese retired para table tennis player. She has won gold medals at every Paralympic Games from 2000 to 2012, for a total of five gold medals, two silvers, and one bronze.

== Personal life ==
She lost her lower left leg in a traffic accident when she was four years old. She began playing the sport at age 11.
