= Karolina Pęk =

Polish para table tennis player

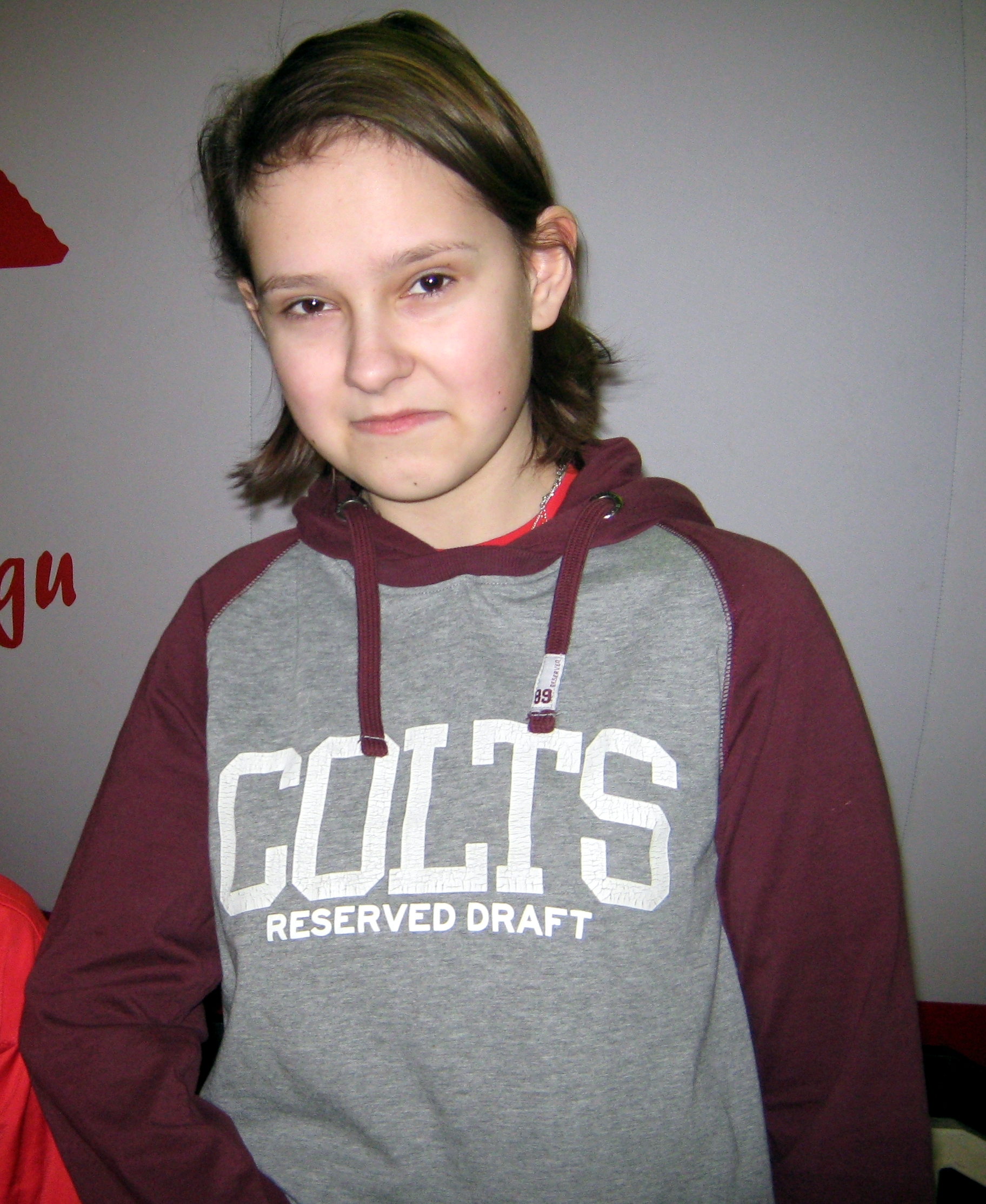
- Karolina Pęk in 2013

Personal information
- Born: Tarnobrzeg, Poland
- Height: 170 cm (5 ft 7 in)

Sport
- Country: Poland
- Sport: Para table tennis
- Disability class: C9
- Coached by: Xu Kai
Medal record
Women's para table tennis
Representing Poland
Paralympic Games
Gold medal – first place	2016 Rio de Janeiro	Teams C6-10
Gold medal – first place	2020 Tokyo	Teams C9-10
Gold medal – first place	2024 Paris	Singles C9
Bronze medal – third place	2012 London	Teams C6-10
Bronze medal – third place	2016 Rio de Janeiro	Singles C9
Bronze medal – third place	2020 Tokyo	Singles C9
Bronze medal – third place	2024 Paris	Doubles WD20
Bronze medal – third place	2024 Paris	Mixed doubles XD17
World Championships
Silver medal – second place	2014 Beijing	Teams C9-10
Silver medal – second place	2018 Lasko	Singles C9
European Championships
Gold medal – first place	2015 Vejle	Teams C9-10
Silver medal – second place	2011 Split	Teams C9-10
Silver medal – second place	2015 Vejle	Singles C9
Silver medal – second place	2017 Lasko	Singles C9
Silver medal – second place	2019 Helsingborg	Singles C9
Silver medal – second place	2019 Helsingborg	Teams C9-10
Bronze medal – third place	2013 Lignano	Singles C9
Bronze medal – third place	2017 Lasko	Teams C9-10

Karolina Pęk (born 8 February 1998) is a Polish para table tennis player who plays in international level events. She is a European multi-medalist and has won team events along with Katarzyna Marszal and Natalia Partyka.
