= Hou Chunxiao =

Chinese para table tennis player

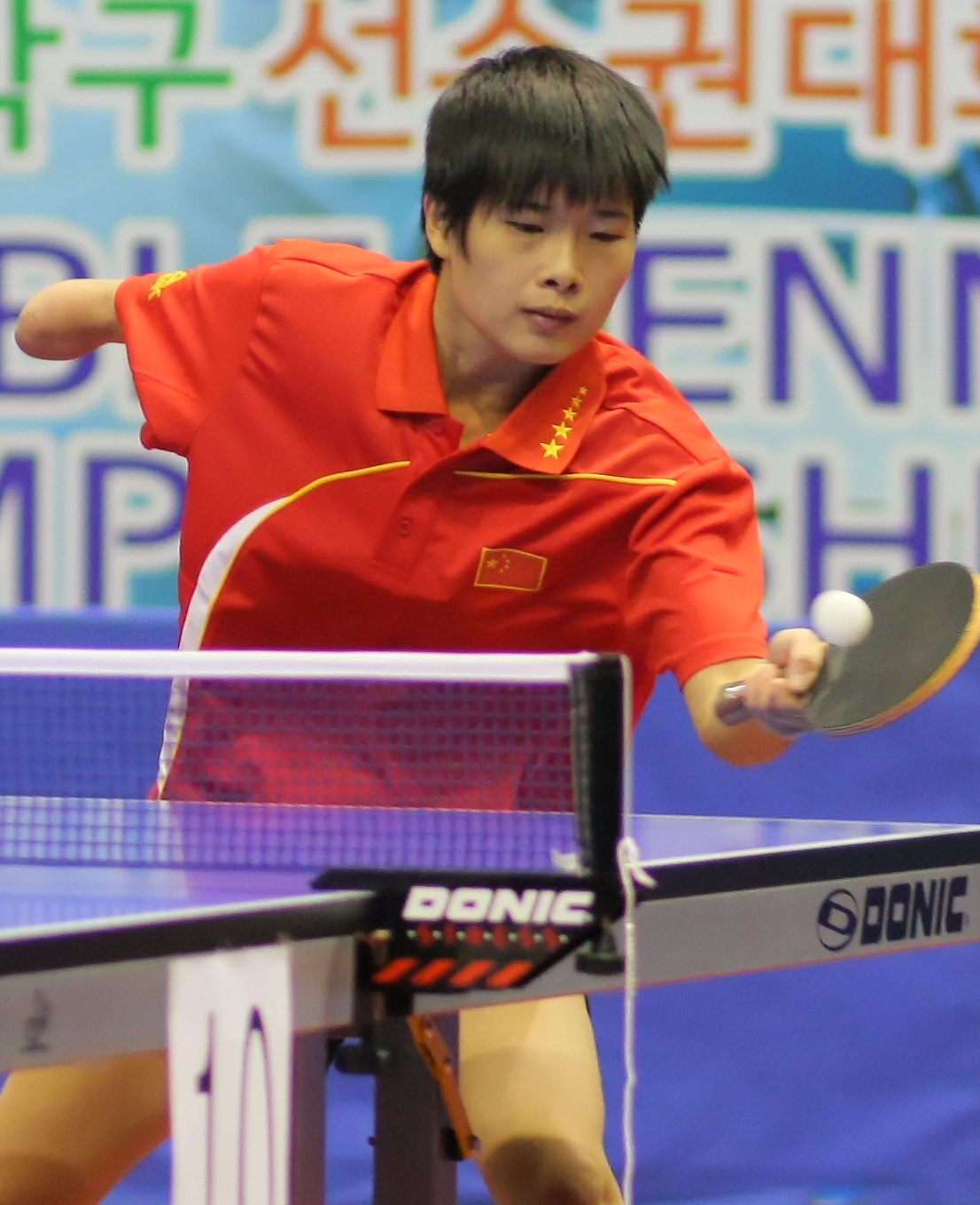
- Hou at the 2010 World Para Table Tennis Championships

Personal information
- Born: 4 August 1988 (age 37) Xiao County, Anhui, China

Sport
- Sport: Table tennis
- Playing style: Left-handed shakehand grip
- Disability class: 10
- Highest ranking: 3 (July 2010)
- Current ranking: 9 (February 2020)
Medal record
Women's para table tennis
Representing China
Paralympic Games
Gold medal – first place	2008 Beijing	Teams C6–10
Bronze medal – third place	2008 Beijing	Singles C10
World Championships
Gold medal – first place	2010 Gwangju	Teams C9–10
Bronze medal – third place	2010 Gwangju	Open singles standing
Asian Para Games
Gold medal – first place	2010 Guangzhou	Teams C9–10
Bronze medal – third place	2022 Hangzhou	Singles C10
Asian Championships
Gold medal – first place	2009 Amman	Teams C6–10
Gold medal – first place	2017 Beijing	Teams C9–10
Silver medal – second place	2009 Amman	Singles C10
Silver medal – second place	2009 Amman	Open singles standing
Silver medal – second place	2019 Taichung	Teams C10
Bronze medal – third place	2017 Beijing	Singles C10
Bronze medal – third place	2019 Taichung	Singles C10

Hou Chunxiao
- Traditional Chinese: 侯春曉
- Simplified Chinese: 侯春晓
Transcriptions
Standard Mandarin
- Hanyu Pinyin: Hóu Chūnxiǎo

Hou Chunxiao (Chinese: 侯春晓, born 4 August 1988) is a Chinese para table tennis player. She won a gold and a bronze medal at the 2008 Summer Paralympics.

== Personal life ==
When she was three years old, she lost her right forearm in a traffic accident which also severely damaged three fingers on her left hand.
