= Yasuko Kudo =

Japanese para table tennis player

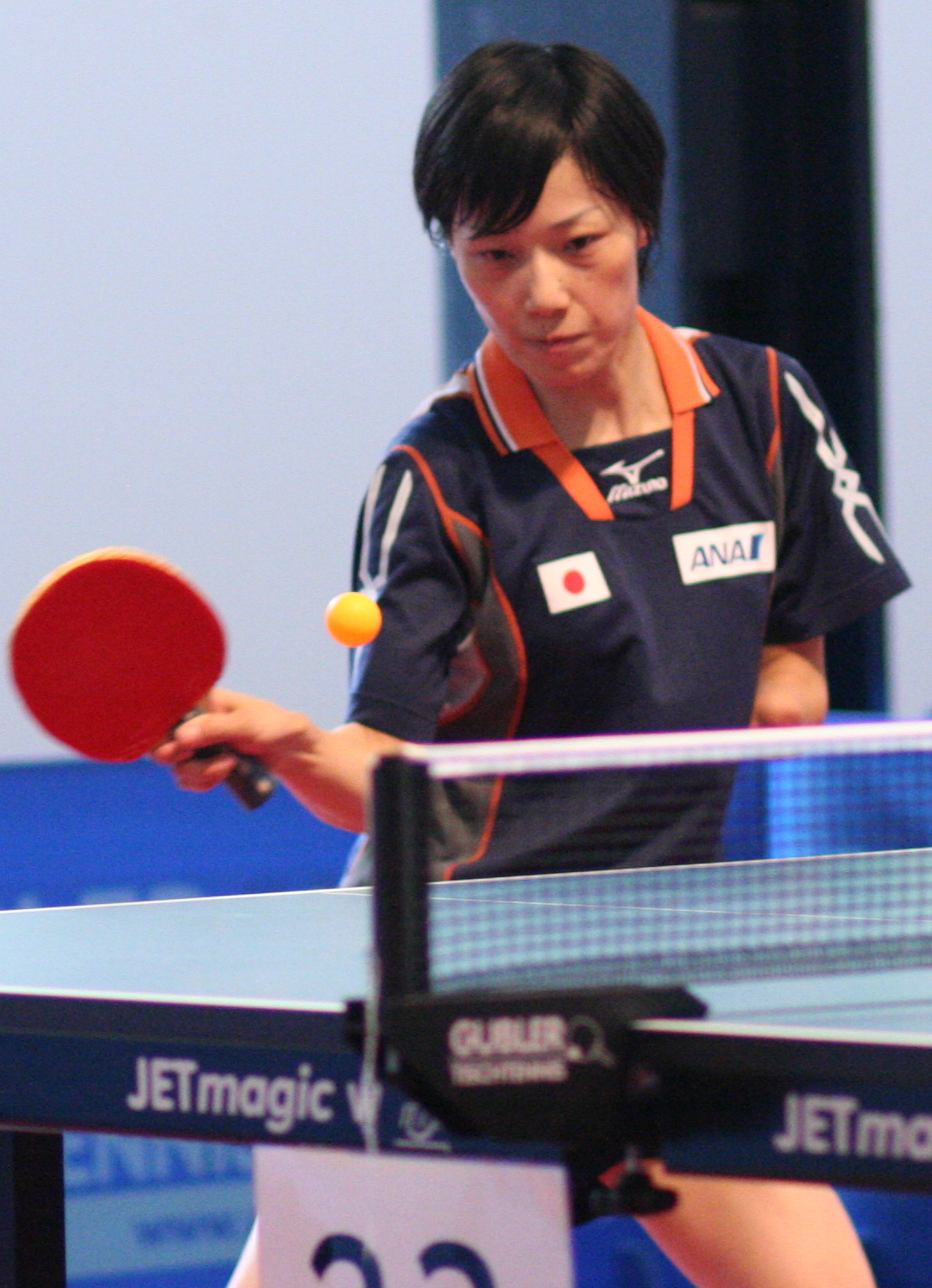
- Kudo at the 2006 World Para Table Tennis Championships

Personal information
- Born: January 31, 1969 (age 57) Kumamoto Prefecture, Japan

Sport
- Sport: Table tennis
- Playing style: Right-handed shakehand grip
- Disability class: 10
- Highest ranking: 3 (January 2001)
- Current ranking: 17 (January 2020)
Medal record
Women's para table tennis
Representing Japan
Paralympic Games
Bronze medal – third place	2000 Sydney	Singles C10
World Championships
Silver medal – second place	2010 Gwangju	Singles C10
Bronze medal – third place	2002 Taipei	Singles C10
Bronze medal – third place	2002 Taipei	Teams C10
Asian Championships
Silver medal – second place	2009 Amman	Teams C6–10
Silver medal – second place	2011 Hong Kong	Teams C6–10
Bronze medal – third place	2005 Kuala Lumpur	Singles C9–10
Bronze medal – third place	2007 Seoul	Singles C10
Bronze medal – third place	2009 Amman	Singles C10
Bronze medal – third place	2013 Beijing	Singles C10
FESPIC Championships
Gold medal – first place	1999 Taipei	Open singles standing
Silver medal – second place	1999 Taipei	Doubles C6–10
Bronze medal – third place	1999 Taipei	Singles C9–10
Bronze medal – third place	2003 Shanghai	Singles C8–10

Yasuko Kudo (工藤 恭子, Kudō Yasuko; born 31 January 1969) is a Japanese para table tennis player. She won a bronze medal at the 2000 Summer Paralympics.

Her left hand was cut off at the wrist by an electric animal feed cutter in an accident when she was five years old.
