= Li Yuqiang =

Chinese para table tennis player

Personal information
- Born: 10 September 1965 (age 60) Ledong Li Autonomous County, Hainan, China

Sport
- Sport: Table tennis
- Playing style: Right-handed shakehand grip
- Disability class: 10
- Highest ranking: 4 (October 2004)
Medal record
Women's para table tennis
Representing China
Paralympic Games
Gold medal – first place	2004 Athens	Teams C6–10
Bronze medal – third place	2004 Athens	Singles C10
Asia and Oceania Championships
Silver medal – second place	2007 Seoul	Singles C10
FESPIC Championships
Gold medal – first place	2003 Shanghai	Singles C8–10

Li Yuqiang
- Traditional Chinese: 黎玉強
- Simplified Chinese: 黎玉强
Transcriptions
Standard Mandarin
- Hanyu Pinyin: Lí Yùqiáng

Li Yuqiang (Chinese: 黎玉强, born 10 September 1965) is a Chinese retired para table tennis player. She is a member of the Li ethnic group on Hainan island. She won a gold and a bronze medal at the 2004 Paralympic Games.

Her left arm was amputated when she was two years old, following a car accident. Although she played the sport when she was young, she did not receive formal training until age 31.
