= Liu Meng (table tennis) =

Chinese para table tennis player

Personal information
- Born: October 20, 1996 (age 29) Wuhan, Hubei, China
- Height: 164 cm (5 ft 5 in)
- Weight: 62 kg (137 lb)

Sport
- Sport: Table tennis
- Playing style: Right-handed shakehand grip
- Disability class: 9
- Highest ranking: 3 (October 2016)
- Current ranking: 7 (February 2020)
Medal record
Women's para table tennis
Representing China
Paralympic Games
Gold medal – first place	2016 Rio de Janeiro	Singles C9
World Championships
Gold medal – first place	2014 Beijing	Teams C9–10
Bronze medal – third place	2014 Beijing	Singles C9
Bronze medal – third place	2018 Laško	Singles C9
Asian Para Games
Gold medal – first place	2014 Incheon	Teams C9–10
Gold medal – first place	2018 Jakarta	Women's doubles C6–10
Gold medal – first place	2018 Jakarta	Mixed doubles C9–10
Silver medal – second place	2010 Guangzhou	Singles C9
Bronze medal – third place	2022 Hangzhou	Singles C9
Asian Championships
Gold medal – first place	2019 Taichung	Teams C9
Silver medal – second place	2019 Taichung	Singles C9
Bronze medal – third place	2011 Hong Kong	Singles C9
Bronze medal – third place	2013 Beijing	Singles C9
Bronze medal – third place	2015 Amman	Singles C9–10

Liu Meng (Chinese: 柳萌; pinyin: Liǔ Méng, born 20 October 1996) is a Chinese para table tennis player. She won a gold medal at the 2016 Summer Paralympics.

== Personal life ==
Liu's lower left leg was amputated when she was six years old, following a car accident.
