= Krystyna Jagodzinska =

Polish para table tennis player

Personal information
- Born: 22 January 1965 (age 61)

Sport
- Sport: Table tennis
Medal record
Women's table tennis
Representing Poland
Paralympic Games
Silver medal – second place	2004 Athens	Teams class 6–10
Bronze medal – third place	1996 Atlanta	Singles class 10
World Championships
Silver medal – second place	2006 Montreux	Teams class 9-10
Bronze medal – third place	1998 Assen	Singles class 10
European Championships
Silver medal – second place	2005 Jesolo	Singles class 10
Silver medal – second place	1999 Piešťany	Singles class 10
Silver medal – second place	1995 Hillerød	Singles class 10
Bronze medal – third place	2001 Frankfurt	Singles class 10
Bronze medal – third place	1995 Hillerød	Teams class 10

Krystyna Jagodzinska (born 22 January 1965) is a Polish para table tennis player. She earned a gold medal for Poland at the 2004 Summer Paralympics and a bronze medal for Poland at the 1996 Summer Paralympics.
