= Fan Lei (table tennis) =

Chinese para table tennis player

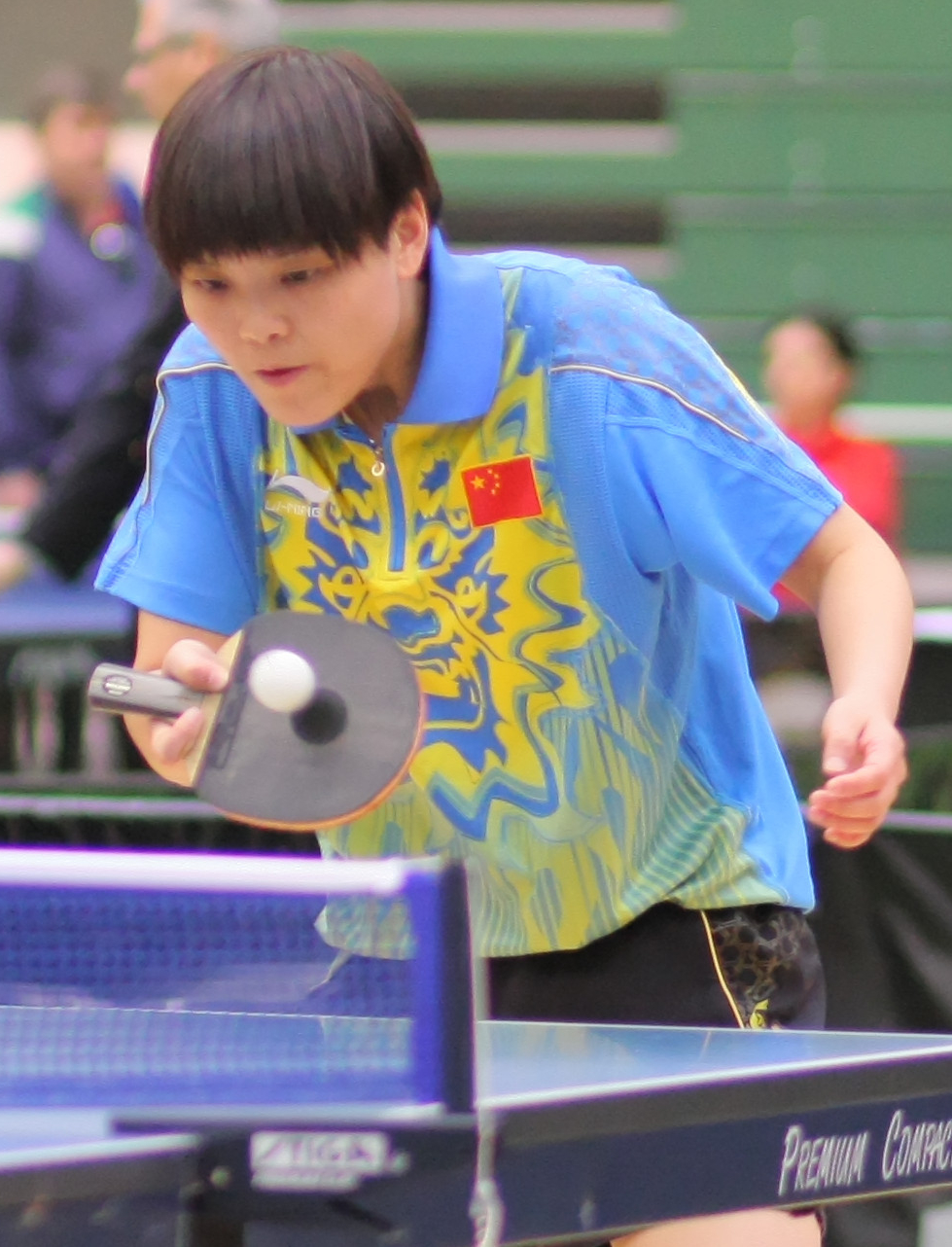
- Fan in 2011

Personal information
- Born: 28 May 1983 (age 43) Huixian, Henan, China

Sport
- Sport: Table tennis
- Playing style: Right-handed penhold
- Disability class: 10
- Highest ranking: 1 (October 2007)
Medal record
Women's para table tennis
Representing China
Paralympic Games
Gold medal – first place	2008 Beijing	Teams C6–10
Gold medal – first place	2012 London	Teams C6–10
Silver medal – second place	2008 Beijing	Singles C10
Bronze medal – third place	2012 London	Singles C10
World Championships
Gold medal – first place	2006 Montreux	Singles C10
Gold medal – first place	2006 Montreux	Teams C9–10
Silver medal – second place	2006 Montreux	Open singles standing
Asian Para Games
Gold medal – first place	2010 Guangzhou	Teams C6–10
Gold medal – first place	2018 Jakarta	Singles C10
Gold medal – first place	2018 Jakarta	Teams C8–10
Asian Championships
Gold medal – first place	2005 Kuala Lumpur	Singles C9–10
Gold medal – first place	2007 Seoul	Singles C10
Gold medal – first place	2007 Seoul	Open singles standing
Gold medal – first place	2011 Hong Kong	Singles C10
Gold medal – first place	2011 Hong Kong	Teams C6–10
Silver medal – second place	2005 Kuala Lumpur	Open singles standing
Silver medal – second place	2019 Taichung	Teams C10
Bronze medal – third place	2019 Taichung	Singles C10

Fan Lei (Chinese: 范蕾; pinyin: Fàn Lěi, born 28 May 1983) is a Chinese retired para table tennis player. She has won four medals in two Paralympic Games (2008 and 2012).

Fan began playing at age 6, before her disability. In 1999, on her way home from a table tennis tournament, she was hit by a motorist and had a fractured right femoral head and avascular necrosis, which resulted in unequal leg length.
