= Lei Lina =

Chinese/Australian para table tennis player

Lei Lina OAM
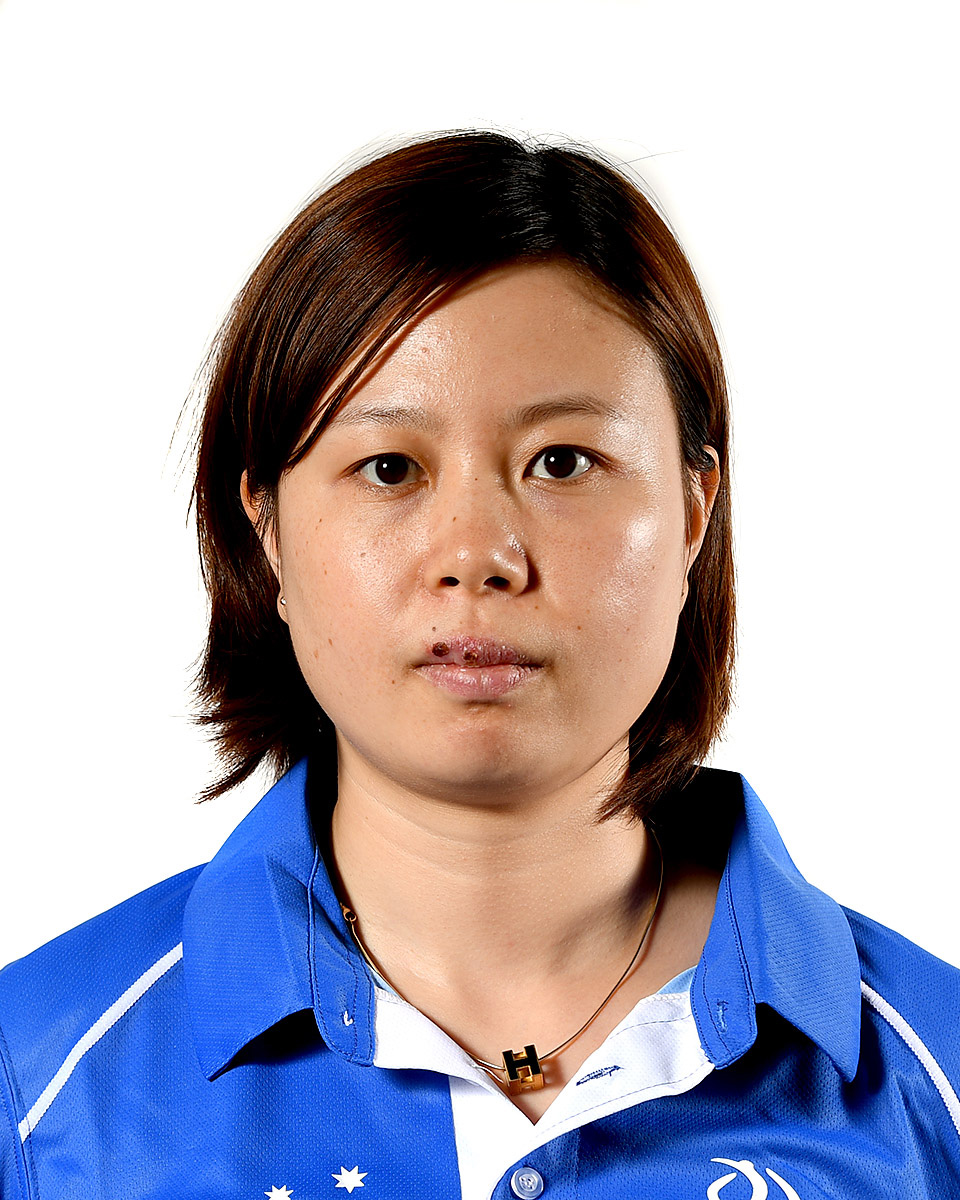

Personal information
- Born: 19 February 1988 (age 38) Lanzhou, Gansu, China
- Height: 165 cm (5 ft 5 in)
- Weight: 58 kg (128 lb)

Sport
- Sport: Table tennis
- Playing style: Left-handed shakehand grip
- Disability class: 9
- Highest ranking: 1 (October 2004)
- Current ranking: 1 (August 2024)
Medal record
Women's para table tennis
Representing Australia
Paralympic Games
Gold medal – first place	2020 Tokyo	Singles C9
Gold medal – first place	2024 Paris	Doubles WD20
Silver medal – second place	2020 Tokyo	Team Class 9-10
Bronze medal – third place	2024 Paris	Singles C9
Commonwealth Games
Silver medal – second place	2022 Birmingham	Singles C6-10
Representing China
Paralympic Games
Gold medal – first place	2004 Athens	Teams C6–10
Gold medal – first place	2008 Beijing	Singles C9
Gold medal – first place	2008 Beijing	Teams C6–10
Gold medal – first place	2012 London	Singles C9
Gold medal – first place	2012 London	Teams C6–10
Silver medal – second place	2004 Athens	Singles C9
Silver medal – second place	2016 Rio de Janeiro	Singles C9
Silver medal – second place	2016 Rio de Janeiro	Teams C6–10
World Championships
Gold medal – first place	2002 Taipei	Open singles standing
Gold medal – first place	2002 Taipei	Teams C6–9
Gold medal – first place	2006 Montreux	Singles C9
Gold medal – first place	2006 Montreux	Teams C9–10
Gold medal – first place	2014 Beijing	Singles C9
Gold medal – first place	2014 Beijing	Teams C9–10
Silver medal – second place	2022 Andalucia	Singles C9
Gold medal – first place	2022 Seville	Women's Doubles 20
Bronze medal – third place	2022 Seville	Mixed Doubles 17
Asian Para Games
Gold medal – first place	2014 Incheon	Teams C9–10
Silver medal – second place	2014 Incheon	Singles C9–10
Bronze medal – third place	2010 Guangzhou	Singles C9
FESPIC Games
Gold medal – first place	2002 Busan	Singles C7–10
Gold medal – first place	2002 Busan	Open singles standing
Gold medal – first place	2006 Kuala Lumpur	Singles C9–10
Gold medal – first place	2006 Kuala Lumpur	Open singles standing
Asian Championships
Gold medal – first place	2005 Kuala Lumpur	Open singles standing
Gold medal – first place	2007 Seoul	Singles C9
Gold medal – first place	2011 Hong Kong	Singles C9
Gold medal – first place	2015 Amman	Teams C6–10
Silver medal – second place	2005 Kuala Lumpur	Singles C9–10
Silver medal – second place	2007 Seoul	Open singles standing
Silver medal – second place	2013 Beijing	Singles C9
FESPIC Championships
Gold medal – first place	2001 Osaka	Singles C6–10
Gold medal – first place	2001 Osaka	Teams C6–10
Gold medal – first place	2003 Shanghai	Open singles standing
Silver medal – second place	2001 Osaka	Open singles standing
Silver medal – second place	2003 Shanghai	Singles C8–10

Lei Lina
- Traditional Chinese: 雷麗娜
- Simplified Chinese: 雷丽娜
Transcriptions
Standard Mandarin
- Hanyu Pinyin: Léi Lìnà

Lei Lina OAM (Chinese: 雷丽娜, born 19 February 1988) is a Chinese and Australian table tennis player who has a leg length difference of 6 cm. Lei has won ten medals in five Paralympic Games, including six gold and four silver medals. Representing Australia, she won two gold meda, a silver and bronze medal at the 2020 Tokyo Paralympics and the 2024 Paris Paralympics.

== Table tennis ==
She began playing at age 7. She attended Nanjing University of Information Science and Technology. Lei moved to Melbourne, Australia in 2017 or later. She also registered with Table Tennis Australia, and competed in the Australian Open during the 2019 ITTF World Tour (with able-bodied athletes), losing her only singles match 0–4 to South Korea's Shin Yu-bin.

In 2020, Lei represented Australia at the 2020 Tokyo Paralympics where she won the gold medal in the Women's individual – Class 9 and the silver medal in the Women's Team Class 9–10.

At the 2022 Commonwealth Games, she won the silver medal in the Women's singles C6–10.

At the 2024 Paris Paralympics, she won a bronze medal in the Women's Singles 9 and the gold medal in the Women's Doubles 20 with Yang Qian.

== Recognition ==
- 2020 - 2022 - Member of the Australian Table Table Tennis Team (Class 9–10) that was awarded 2020 Paralympics Australia Team of the Year
- 2022 – Medal of the Order of Australia for service to sport as a gold medallist at the Tokyo Paralympic Games 2020
