= Xiong Guiyan =

Chinese para table tennis player

Personal information
- Born: March 6, 1976 (age 50) Yichun, Heilongjiang, China
- Height: 165 cm (5 ft 5 in)
- Weight: 55 kg (121 lb)

Sport
- Sport: Table tennis
- Playing style: Right-handed penhold
- Disability class: 9
- Highest ranking: 1 (October 2017)
- Current ranking: 1
Medal record
Women's para table tennis
Representing China
Paralympic Games
Silver medal – second place	2016 Rio de Janeiro	Teams C6–10
Silver medal – second place	2020 Tokyo	Individual C9
Silver medal – second place	2024 Paris	Singles C9
Silver medal – second place	2024 Paris	Doubles XD17
World Championships
Gold medal – first place	2014 Beijing	Teams C9–10
Silver medal – second place	2014 Beijing	Singles C9
Bronze medal – third place	2018 Lasko	Singles C9
Asian Para Games
Gold medal – first place	2014 Incheon	Teams C9–10
Gold medal – first place	2018 Jakarta	Singles C9
Gold medal – first place	2018 Jakarta	Teams C8–10
Bronze medal – third place	2014 Incheon	Singles C9–10
Bronze medal – third place	2022 Hangzhou	Singles C9
Asian Championships
Gold medal – first place	2013 Beijing	Singles C9
Gold medal – first place	2015 Amman	Teams C6–10
Gold medal – first place	2017 Beijing	Singles C9
Gold medal – first place	2017 Beijing	Teams C9–10
Gold medal – first place	2019 Taichung	Singles C9
Gold medal – first place	2019 Taichung	Teams C9
Silver medal – second place	2015 Amman	Singles C9–10

Xiong Guiyan
- Traditional Chinese: 熊桂艷
- Simplified Chinese: 熊桂艳
Transcriptions
Standard Mandarin
- Hanyu Pinyin: Xióng Guìyàn

Xiong Guiyan (Chinese: 熊桂艳, born 6 March 1976) is a Chinese para table tennis player. She won a silver medal at the 2016 Summer Paralympics held in Rio de Janeiro, Brazil. She also won the silver medal in the women's individual C9 event at the 2020 Summer Paralympics held in Tokyo, Japan.

== Personal life ==
Before she became disabled, Xiong was a table tennis prodigy. She represented her home province Heilongjiang in national competitions when she was 13. However, she was soon diagnosed with Garre's sclerosing osteomyelitis, and the pain forced her to retire in 1997, after the National Games. She got married and moved to Jiangmen, and did not play the sport seriously again until she was 37.
