= Natalia Partyka =

Polish para table tennis player

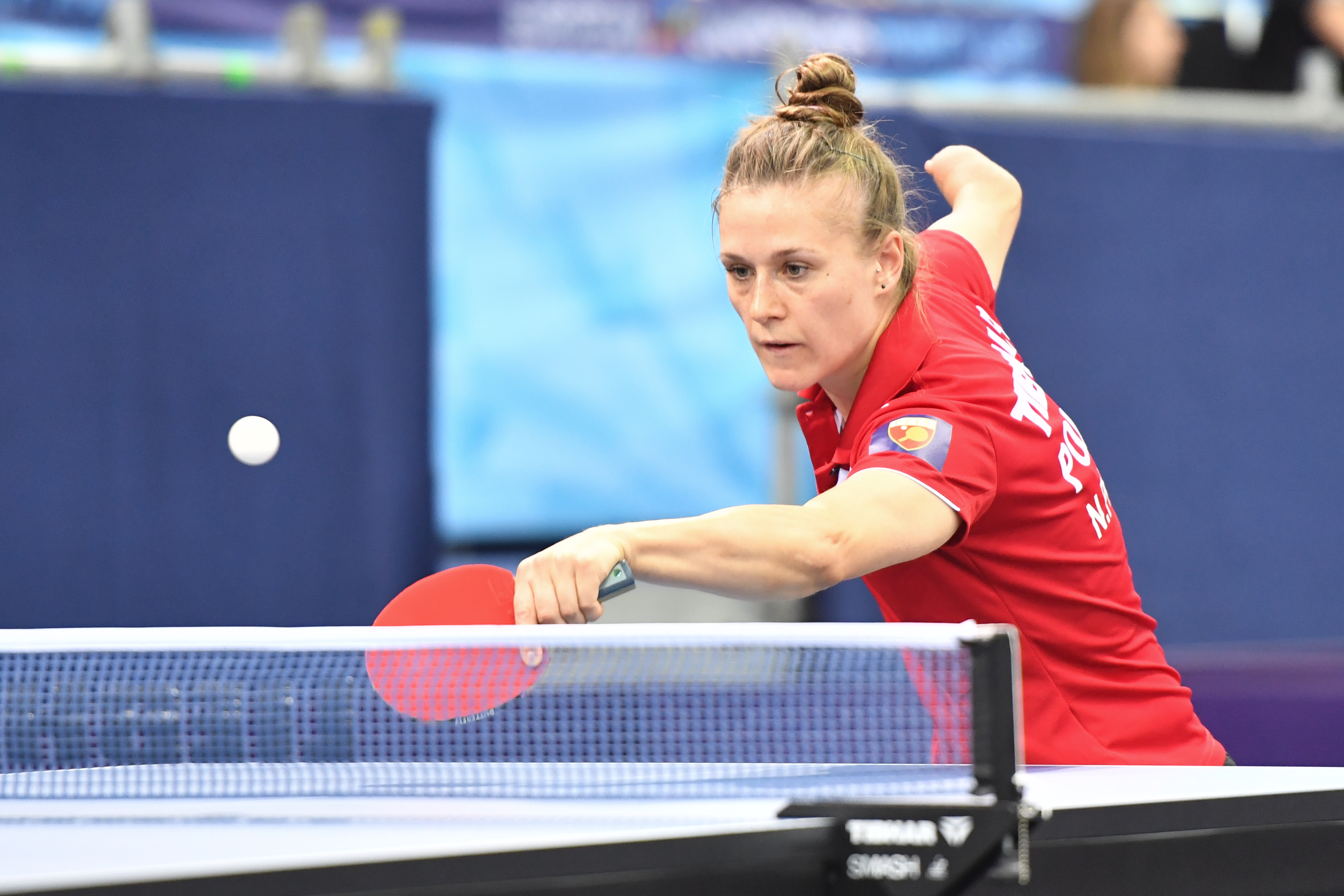

Personal information
- Full name: Natalia Dorota Partyka
- Nationality: Poland
- Born: 27 July 1989 (age 36) Gdańsk, Poland
- Height: 1.73 m (5 ft 8 in)

Sport
- Sport: Table tennis
- Highest ranking: 1 (November 2018; Para); 48 (May 2010; Able-bodied)
Medal record
Women's table tennis
Representing Poland
Paralympic Games
Gold medal – first place	2004 Athens	Class 10
Gold medal – first place	2008 Beijing	Class 10
Gold medal – first place	2012 London	Class 10
Gold medal – first place	2016 Rio de Janeiro	Class 10
Gold medal – first place	2016 Rio de Janeiro	Team class 6–10
Gold medal – first place	2020 Tokyo	Team class 9–10
Silver medal – second place	2008 Beijing	Team class 6–10
Silver medal – second place	2024 Paris	Singles C10
Bronze medal – third place	2012 London	Team class 6–10
Bronze medal – third place	2020 Tokyo	Class 10
Bronze medal – third place	2024 Paris	Doubles WD20
World Para Table Tennis Championships
Gold medal – first place	2002 Taipei	Singles class 10
Gold medal – first place	2002 Taipei	Teams class 10
Gold medal – first place	2006 Montreux	Open singles standing
Gold medal – first place	2010 Gwangju	Open singles standing
Gold medal – first place	2010 Gwangju	Singles class 10
Gold medal – first place	2014 Beijing	Singles class 10
Gold medal – first place	2018 Laško-Celje	Singles class 10
Silver medal – second place	2006 Montreux	Singles class 10
Silver medal – second place	2006 Montreux	Teams class 9-10
Silver medal – second place	2014 Beijing	Teams class 9-10
Bronze medal – third place	2010 Gwangju	Teams class 9-10
European Para Table Tennis Championships
Gold medal – first place	1999 Piešťany	Teams class 10
Gold medal – first place	2001 Frankfurt	Teams class 10
Gold medal – first place	2003 Zagreb	Singles class 10
Gold medal – first place	2003 Zagreb	Teams class 10
Gold medal – first place	2005 Jesolo	Open singles standing
Gold medal – first place	2005 Jesolo	Singles class 10
Gold medal – first place	2005 Jesolo	Teams class 9-10
Gold medal – first place	2007 Kranjska Gora	Open singles standing
Gold medal – first place	2007 Kranjska Gora	Singles class 10
Gold medal – first place	2007 Kranjska Gora	Teams class 9-10
Gold medal – first place	2009 Genoa	Open singles standing
Gold medal – first place	2009 Genoa	Singles class 10
Gold medal – first place	2009 Genoa	Teams class 9-10
Gold medal – first place	2011 Split	Singles class 10
Gold medal – first place	2015 Vejle	Singles class 10
Gold medal – first place	2015 Vejle	Teams class 9-10
Gold medal – first place	2017 Laško	Singles class 10
Silver medal – second place	2001 Frankfurt	Singles class 10
Silver medal – second place	2003 Zagreb	Open singles standing
European Championships
Silver medal – second place	2009 Stuttgart	Team
Bronze medal – third place	2008 Saint Petersburg	Doubles
European Games
Bronze medal – third place	2019 Minsk	Team

Natalia Dorota Partyka (born 27 July 1989) is a Polish para table tennis player. Born without a right hand and forearm, she participates in competitions for able-bodied athletes as well as in competitions for athletes with disabilities. Partyka reached the last 32 of the London 2012 Olympic women's table tennis.

== Early life ==
Partyka began playing table tennis at the age of seven years. She won her first international table tennis medal in 1999 at the disabled World Championships. At the age of 11, when she competed at the 2000 Summer Paralympics in Sydney, she became the world's youngest ever Paralympian. In 2004, she won a gold medal in the singles event and silver in the team event at the Athens Paralympics. Also in 2004, she won two gold medals at the International Table Tennis Federation's European Championships for Cadets, which was open to able-bodied competitors. In 2006, Partyka won three gold medals at the European Paralympic Championships, one gold and two silvers at the International Paralympic Committee's Table Tennis World Championships for Disabled, and a silver in the team event at the ITTF European Junior Championship. She also won two silver medals and one bronze at the 2007 edition of that competition. Also in 2007, Partyka won three gold medals at the European Paralympic Championships, and a bronze at the ITTF World Junior Teams Championships.

== Olympics and Paralympics performance ==
Partyka competed for Poland both the 2008 Summer Olympics and the 2008 Summer Paralympics in Beijing – one of only two athletes to do so, the other being Natalie du Toit in swimming. They were her third Paralympic Games, and her first Olympics. Competing in class 10 at the Beijing Paralympics, she won gold by defeating China's Fan Lei by three sets to nil.

In 2008, she won a gold medal in the singles event and a silver in the team event at the Beijing Paralympics, repeating her Athens Paralympics result.

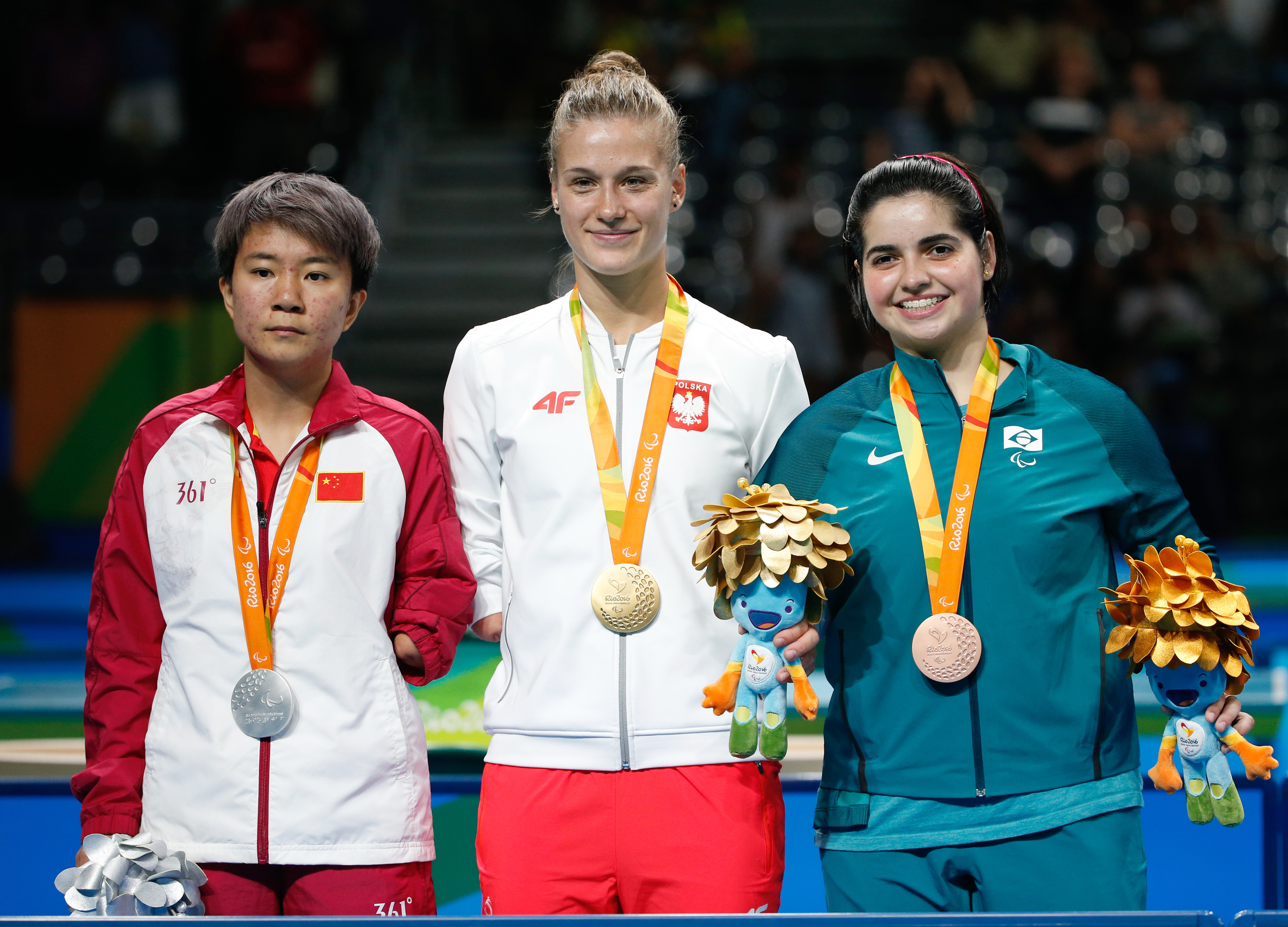
Partyka (center) at the Paralympic 2016

She competed at the 2012 Summer Olympics and 2012 Summer Paralympics in London. In the Olympics, she competed in women's singles table tennis. On 3 September 2012 Partyka defeated China's Qiang Yang 3–2 in the gold medal match to become Paralympic champion. On 8 September 2012 she won bronze in the women's team class 6–10, after defeating France 3–2.

At the 2016 Summer Olympics she competed in the women's team event and later won her fourth consecutive Paralympic singles gold medal at the 2016 Summer Paralympics.

== Awards and recognitions ==
For her sport achievements, Partyka received:
Knight's Cross of the Order of Polonia Restituta (5th class) in 2008
Officer's Cross of the Order of Polonia Restituta (4th class) in 2013

== See also ==
- List of athletes who have competed in the Paralympics and Olympics
- Natalie du Toit
- Artur Partyka
