= Michelle Sévin =

French para table tennis player

Personal information
- Born: 29 October 1955 (age 70) Ille-et-Vilaine, France
- Home town: Rennes, France

Sport
- Country: France
- Sport: Para table tennis
- Disability: Hemiplegia
- Disability class: C10
- Retired: 2004
Medal record
Para table tennis
Representing France
Paralympic Games
| Gold medal – first place | 1996 Atlanta | Women's singles C10 |
| Silver medal – second place | 1992 Barcelona | Women's teams C10 |
| Silver medal – second place | 2000 Sydney | Women's singles C10 |
| Bronze medal – third place | 1996 Atlanta | Women's teams C6-10 |
World Championships
| Silver medal – second place | 1990 Assen | Women's teams C10 |
| Silver medal – second place | 1998 Paris | Women's singles C10 |
| Bronze medal – third place | 1990 Assen | Women's singles C10 |
| Bronze medal – third place | 1990 Assen | Open singles standing |
| Bronze medal – third place | 1998 Paris | Women's teams C6-10 |
European Championships
| Gold medal – first place | 1995 Hillerød | Women's singles C10 |
| Gold medal – first place | 1995 Hillerød | Women's teams C10 |
| Silver medal – second place | 1991 Salou | Women's singles C10 |
| Silver medal – second place | 1997 Stockholm | Women's singles C10 |
| Silver medal – second place | 1997 Stockholm | Women's teams C6-10 |
| Silver medal – second place | 1999 Piešťany | Women's doubles C6-10 |
| Silver medal – second place | 1999 Piešťany | Open singles standing |
| Silver medal – second place | 2001 Frankfurt | Women's teams C10 |
| Bronze medal – third place | 1991 Salou | Women's teams C10 |
| Bronze medal – third place | 1999 Piešťany | Women's singles C10 |
| Bronze medal – third place | 1999 Piešťany | Women's teams C10 |

Michelle Sévin (born 29 October 1955) is a retired French para table tennis player. She was awarded the Legion of Honor and Order of Merit for her services to youth and sport and voluntary work.
