= Claire Mairie =

French para table tennis player

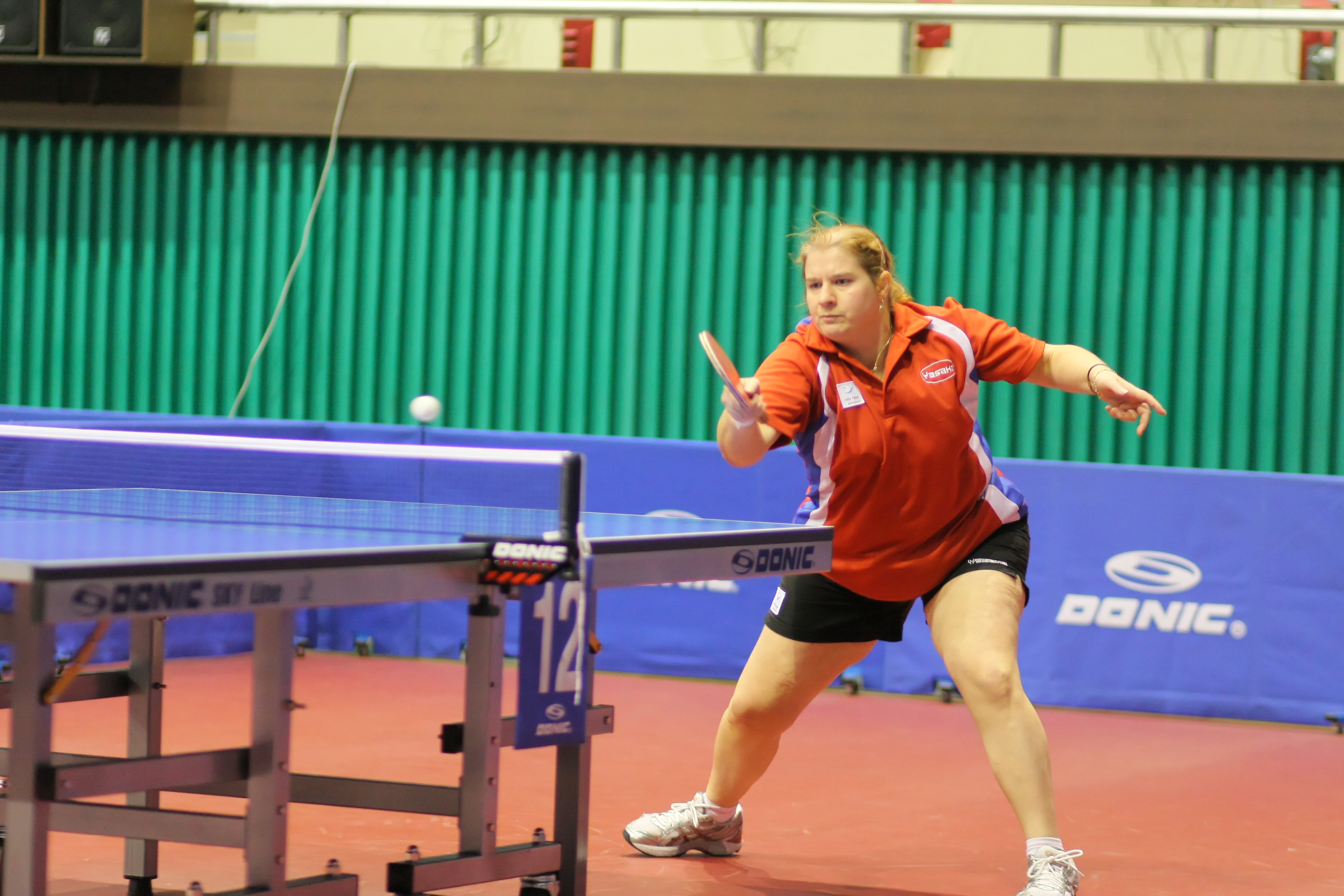

Personal information
- Born: 3 November 1977 (age 48) Hirson, France
- Home town: Roncq, France

Sport
- Country: France
- Sport: Para table tennis
- Disability: Rheumatoid arthritis
- Disability class: C9
Medal record
Women's para table tennis
Representing France
Paralympic Games
Bronze medal – third place	2004 Athens	Team C6-10
Bronze medal – third place	2008 Beijing	Team C6-10
World Championships
Gold medal – first place	2010 Gwangju	Singles C9
Bronze medal – third place	2006 Montreux	Teams C9-10
European Championships
Gold medal – first place	2007 Kranjska Gora	Teams C8
Gold medal – first place	2009 Genoa	Teams C6-8
Silver medal – second place	2005 Jesolo	Open singles standing
Silver medal – second place	2009 Genoa	Singles C8
Bronze medal – third place	2005 Jesolo	Teams C9-10
Bronze medal – third place	2011 Split	Teams C9-10
Bronze medal – third place	2013 Lignano	Singles C9
Bronze medal – third place	2013 Lignano	Teams C9-10
Bronze medal – third place	2015 Vejle	Singles C9

Claire Mairie (born 3 November 1977) is a French former para table tennis player who played in international level events. She was diagnosed with rheumatoid arthritis aged 21 and played table tennis since 2003. She has played in team events along with Anne Barneoud, Audrey Le Morvan and Thu Kamkasomphou.
