= Josefin Abrahamsson =

Swedish table tennis player (born 1979)

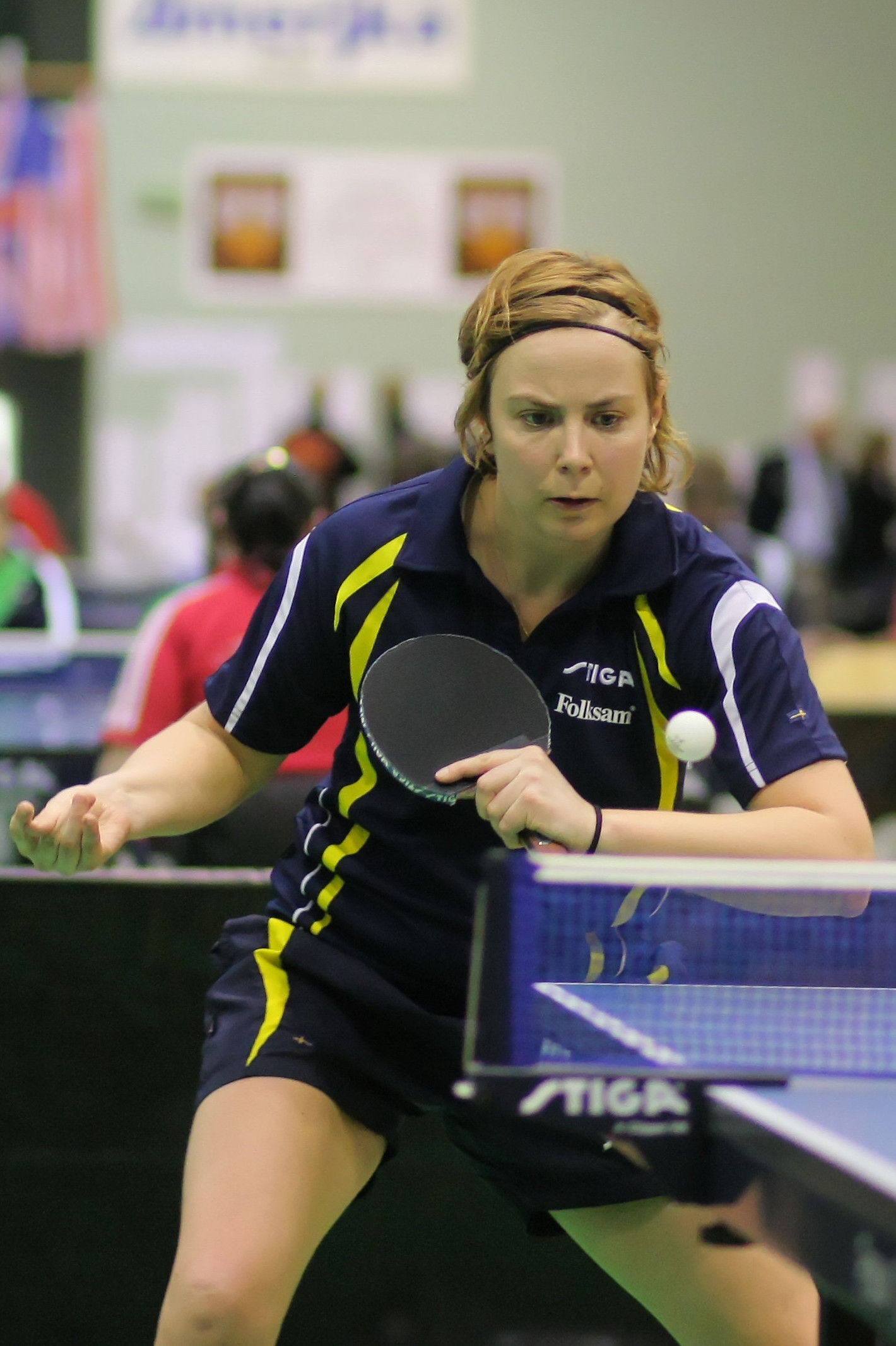

Personal information
- Born: 4 October 1979 (age 46) Malmö, Sweden

Sport
- Sport: Para table tennis
Medal record
Representing Sweden
Paralympic Games
Silver medal – second place	2008 Beijing	Singles C8
Bronze medal – third place	2012 London	Singles C8
World Championships
Gold medal – first place	2006 Montreux	Singles C8
Gold medal – first place	2006 Montreux	Teams C6-8
Bronze medal – third place	2010 Gwangju	Singles C8
European Championships
Gold medal – first place	2005 Jesolo	Teams C6-8
Gold medal – first place	2011 Split	Teams C8
Silver medal – second place	2007 Kranjska Gora	Teams C8
Silver medal – second place	2013 Lignano	Teams C6-8
Bronze medal – third place	1995 Hillerod	Singles C9
Bronze medal – third place	1997 Stockholm	Singles C9
Bronze medal – third place	1999 Piestany	Doubles C20
Bronze medal – third place	2001 Frankfurt	Teams C9
Bronze medal – third place	2009 Genoa	Singles C8

Josefin Abrahamsson (born 4 October 1979) is a Swedish para table tennis player. She became world champion in Switzerland in 2006. She has also medaled in two Paralympic Games. She won a silver medal in 2008 Summer Paralympics and a bronze medal in 2012 Summer Paralympics.
