= Thu Kamkasomphou =

French para table tennis player

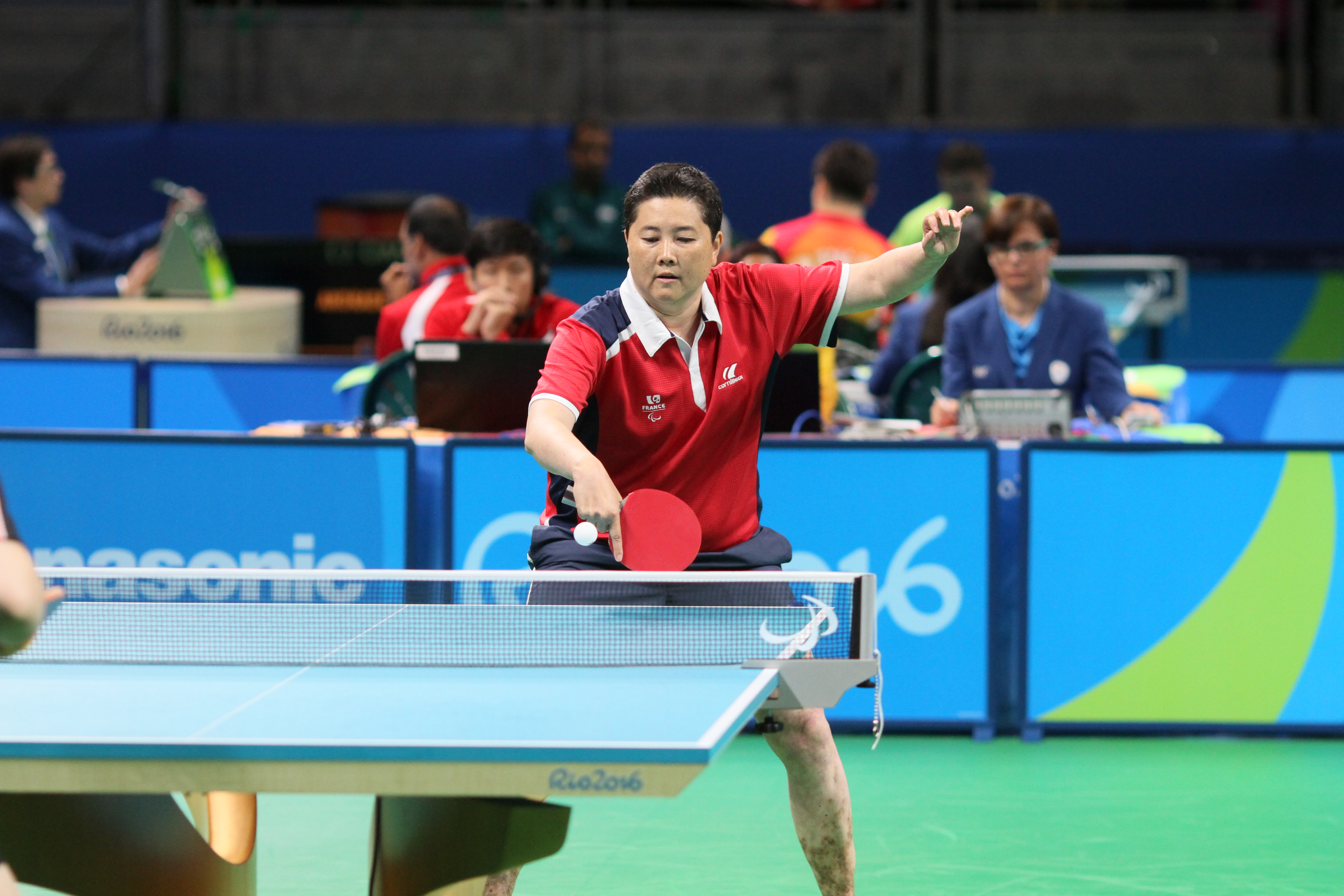
- Kamkasomphou at the 2016 Summer Paralympics

Personal information
- Full name: Thu Françoise Kamkasomphou
- Nationality: Laos; France
- Born: 12 October 1968 (age 57) Savannakhet, Laos
- Height: 168 cm (5 ft 6 in)
- Weight: 69 kg (152 lb)

Sport
- Sport: Table tennis
- Playing style: Right-handed shakehand grip
- Disability class: 8 (formerly 7 and 9)
- Highest ranking: 1 (July 2007)
- Current ranking: 2 (February 2020)
Medal record
Women's para table tennis
Representing France
Paralympic Games
| Gold medal – first place | 2000 Sydney | Singles C9 |
| Gold medal – first place | 2008 Beijing | Singles C8 |
| Silver medal – second place | 2012 London | Singles C8 |
| Silver medal – second place | 2016 Rio de Janeiro | Singles C8 |
| Bronze medal – third place | 2000 Sydney | Teams C6–10 |
| Bronze medal – third place | 2004 Athens | Singles C9 |
| Bronze medal – third place | 2004 Athens | Teams C6–10 |
| Bronze medal – third place | 2008 Beijing | Teams C6–10 |
| Bronze medal – third place | 2020 Tokyo | Singles C8 |
World Championships
| Gold medal – first place | 2010 Gwangju | Singles C8 |
| Silver medal – second place | 2006 Montreux | Singles C9 |
| Silver medal – second place | 2018 Laško | Singles C8 |
| Bronze medal – third place | 2002 Taipei | Singles C9 |
| Bronze medal – third place | 2006 Montreux | Teams C9–10 |
| Bronze medal – third place | 2014 Beijing | Singles C9 |
| Bronze medal – third place | 2014 Beijing | Teams C6–8 |
European Championships
| Gold medal – first place | 2001 Frankfurt | Open singles standing |
| Gold medal – first place | 2001 Frankfurt | Singles C9 |
| Gold medal – first place | 2003 Zagreb | Open singles standing |
| Gold medal – first place | 2003 Zagreb | Singles C9 |
| Gold medal – first place | 2005 Jesolo | Singles C9 |
| Gold medal – first place | 2007 Kranjska Gora | Singles C8 |
| Gold medal – first place | 2007 Kranjska Gora | Teams C8 |
| Gold medal – first place | 2009 Genoa | Singles C8 |
| Gold medal – first place | 2009 Genoa | Teams C6–8 |
| Gold medal – first place | 2011 Split | Singles C8 |
| Gold medal – first place | 2013 Lignano | Singles C8 |
| Gold medal – first place | 2013 Lignano | Teams C6–8 |
| Gold medal – first place | 2019 Helsingborg | Singles C8 |
| Silver medal – second place | 2001 Frankfurt | Teams C10 |
| Silver medal – second place | 2011 Split | Teams C8 |
| Silver medal – second place | 2017 Laško | Teams C6–8 |
| Bronze medal – third place | 2003 Zagreb | Teams C10 |
| Bronze medal – third place | 2005 Jesolo | Open singles standing |
| Bronze medal – third place | 2005 Jesolo | Teams C9–10 |
| Bronze medal – third place | 2007 Kranjska Gora | Open singles standing |
| Bronze medal – third place | 2015 Vejle | Singles C8 |
| Bronze medal – third place | 2015 Vejle | Teams C6–8 |

Thu Françoise Kamkasomphou (Lao: ທູ ຄຳຄະຊົມພູ, born 12 October 1968) is a Laotian-French para table tennis player. She has won eight Paralympic medals for France.

At the 2000 Summer Paralympics, she captured a gold medal in the class 9 event. At the 2008 Summer Paralympics, she won a gold in the class 8 event by defeating Sweden's Josefin Abrahamsson, three sets to nil.

She has polyarteritis nodosa.
