= Yulia Ovsyannikova =

Russian para table tennis player

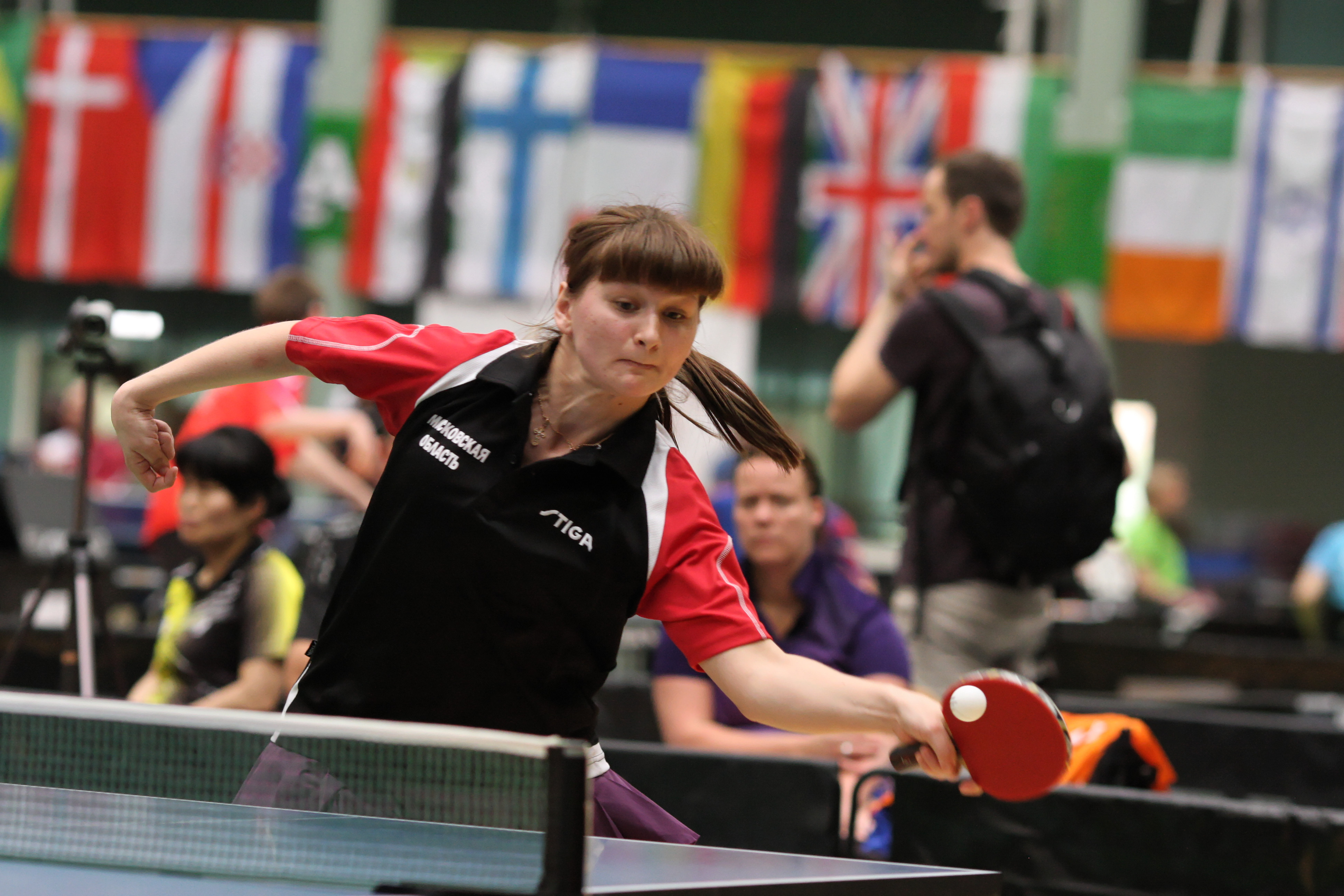
- Ovsyannikova in 2012

Personal information
- Born: 4 June 1987 (age 39) Leningrad, Soviet Union

Sport
- Sport: Para table tennis
- Disability: Cerebral palsy
- Disability class: C7
Medal record
Representing Russia
Paralympic Games
Silver medal – second place	2008 Beijing	Singles C6-7
Silver medal – second place	2012 London	Singles C7
Bronze medal – third place	2004 Athens	Singles C6-8
World Championships
Gold medal – first place	2006 Montreux	Singles C6-7
Gold medal – first place	2017 Bratislava	Teams C6-7
Silver medal – second place	2006 Montreux	Teams C6-8
Bronze medal – third place	2010 Gwangju	Singles C7
European Championships
Gold medal – first place	2003 Zagreb	Singles C6-8
Gold medal – first place	2003 Zagreb	Teams C6-9
Gold medal – first place	2005 Jesolo	Singles C7
Gold medal – first place	2007 Kranjska Gora	Singles C6-7
Gold medal – first place	2015 Vejle	Teams C6-8
Silver medal – second place	2005 Jesolo	Teams C6-8
Silver medal – second place	2009 Genoa	Teams C6-8
Silver medal – second place	2013 Lignano	Singles C7
Bronze medal – third place	1999 Piestany	Teams C8
Bronze medal – third place	2011 Split	Teams C6-7
Bronze medal – third place	2015 Vejle	Singles C7
Bronze medal – third place	2017 Lasko	Singles C7
Bronze medal – third place	2017 Lasko	Teams C6-8

Yulia Shishkina-Ovsyannikova or sometimes Ulija Ovsyannikova or Julija Ovsjannikova (born 4 June 1987) is a Russian retired para table tennis player who competed in international table tennis competitions. She is a double World champion, five-time European champion and three-time Paralympic medalist in both singles and teams events.
