= Jane Karla Gögel =

Brazilian para archer and para table tennis player

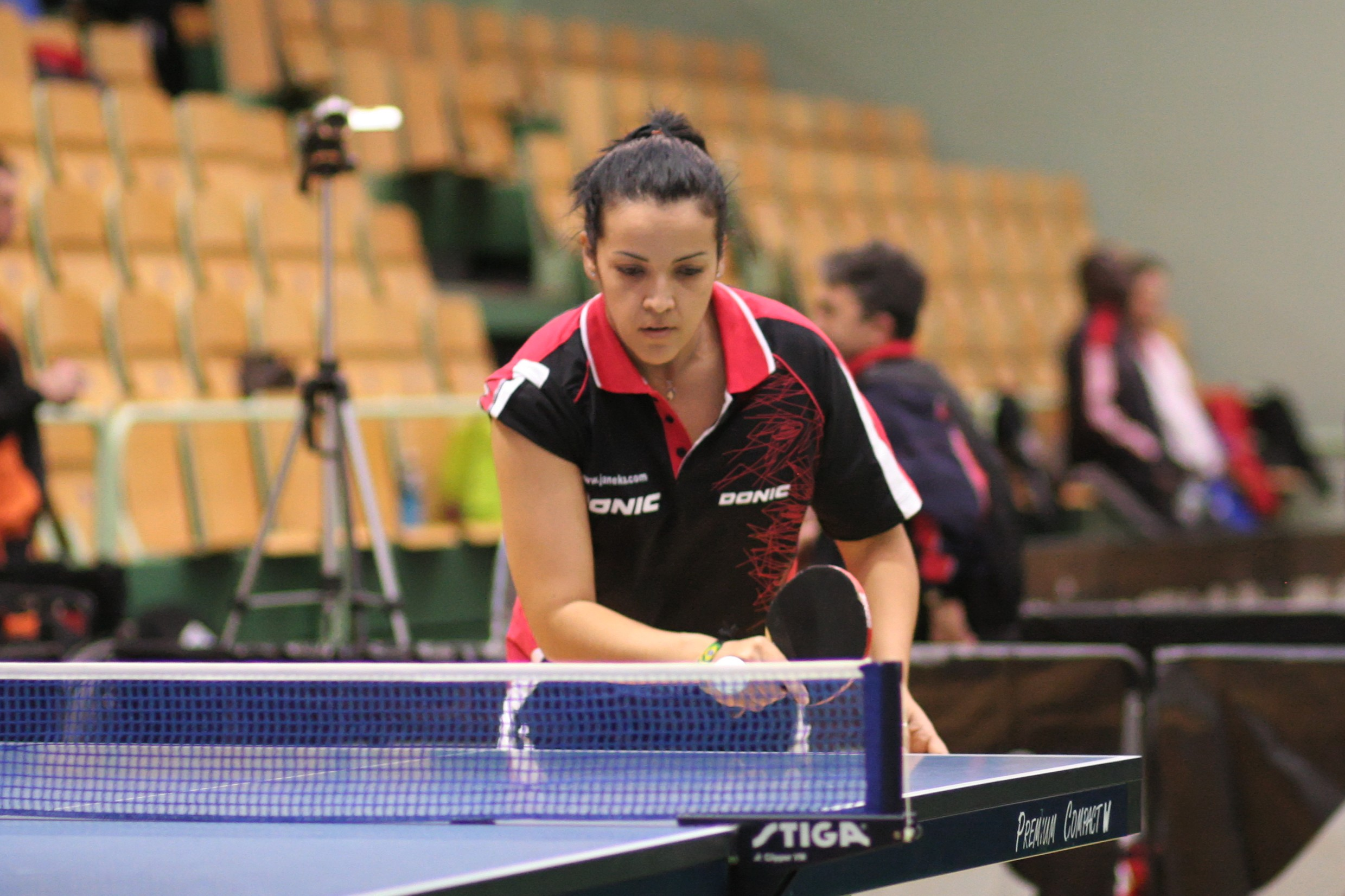
- Gögel in 2009

Personal information
- Full name: Jane Karla Rodrigues Gögel
- Born: 6 July 1975 (age 50) Goiânia, Brazil

Sport
- Country: Brazil
- Sport: Para archery; Para table tennis
Medal record
Representing Brazil
Women's compound para archery
World Championships
Bronze medal – third place	2023 Plzeň	Individual
Parapan American Games
Gold medal – first place	2015 Toronto	Individual
Women's para table tennis
Parapan American Games
Gold medal – first place	2011 Guadalajara	Singles C7-9
Gold medal – first place	2007 Rio de Janeiro	Singles C6-8
Gold medal – first place	2007 Rio de Janeiro	Open C6-10

Jane Karla Rodrigues Gögel (born 6 July 1975) is a Brazilian para archer and former para table tennis player who competed in five Paralympic Games from 2008 to 2024. She started her career in 2003.

== Starting in table tennis ==
Gögel started her career in 2003 when she was invited to try different sports. She loved table tennis and so started to practise. When she got better she started winning national tournaments and participating at international tournaments. At the Parapan Championships in 2005 she won her first medals and qualified for the World Championships 2006.

== See also ==
- Archery at the 2016 Summer Paralympics – Team compound open
