= Audrey Le Morvan =

French para table tennis player

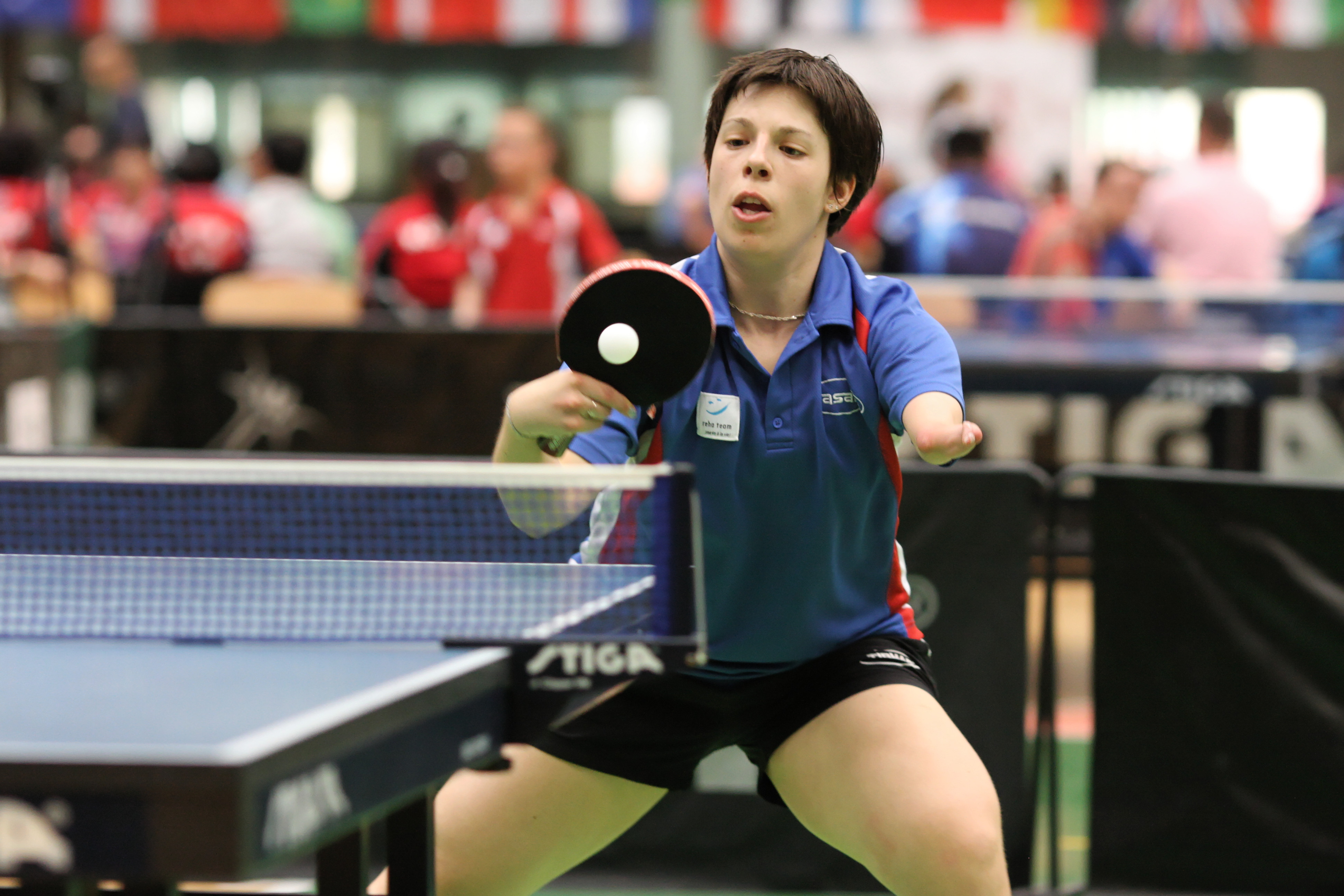
- Le Morvan in 2012

Personal information
- Born: 5 October 1987 (age 38) Lannion, France
- Home town: Louannec, France

Sport
- Country: France
- Sport: Para table tennis
- Disability: Amelia of left arm
- Disability class: C10
- Retired: 2013
Medal record
Women's para table tennis
Representing France
Paralympic Games
Bronze medal – third place	2004 Athens	Team C6-10
Bronze medal – third place	2008 Beijing	Team C6-10
World Championships
Bronze medal – third place	2006 Montreux	Singles C10
Bronze medal – third place	2006 Montreux	Teams C9-10
European Championships
Silver medal – second place	2007 Kranksja Gora	Singles C10
Bronze medal – third place	2003 Zagreb	Teams C10
Bronze medal – third place	2005 Jesolo	Singles C10
Bronze medal – third place	2005 Jesolo	Teams C9-10
Bronze medal – third place	2011 Split	Teams C9-10
Bronze medal – third place	2013 Lignano	Teams C9-10

Audrey Le Morvan (born 5 October 1987) is a former French para table tennis player who competed in international level events. She participated in three Paralympic Games and was a double bronze medalist. She was born with a deformed left forearm. She has competed in team events with Claire Mairie and Thu Kamkasomphou.
