= Neslihan Kavas =

Turkish para table tennis player

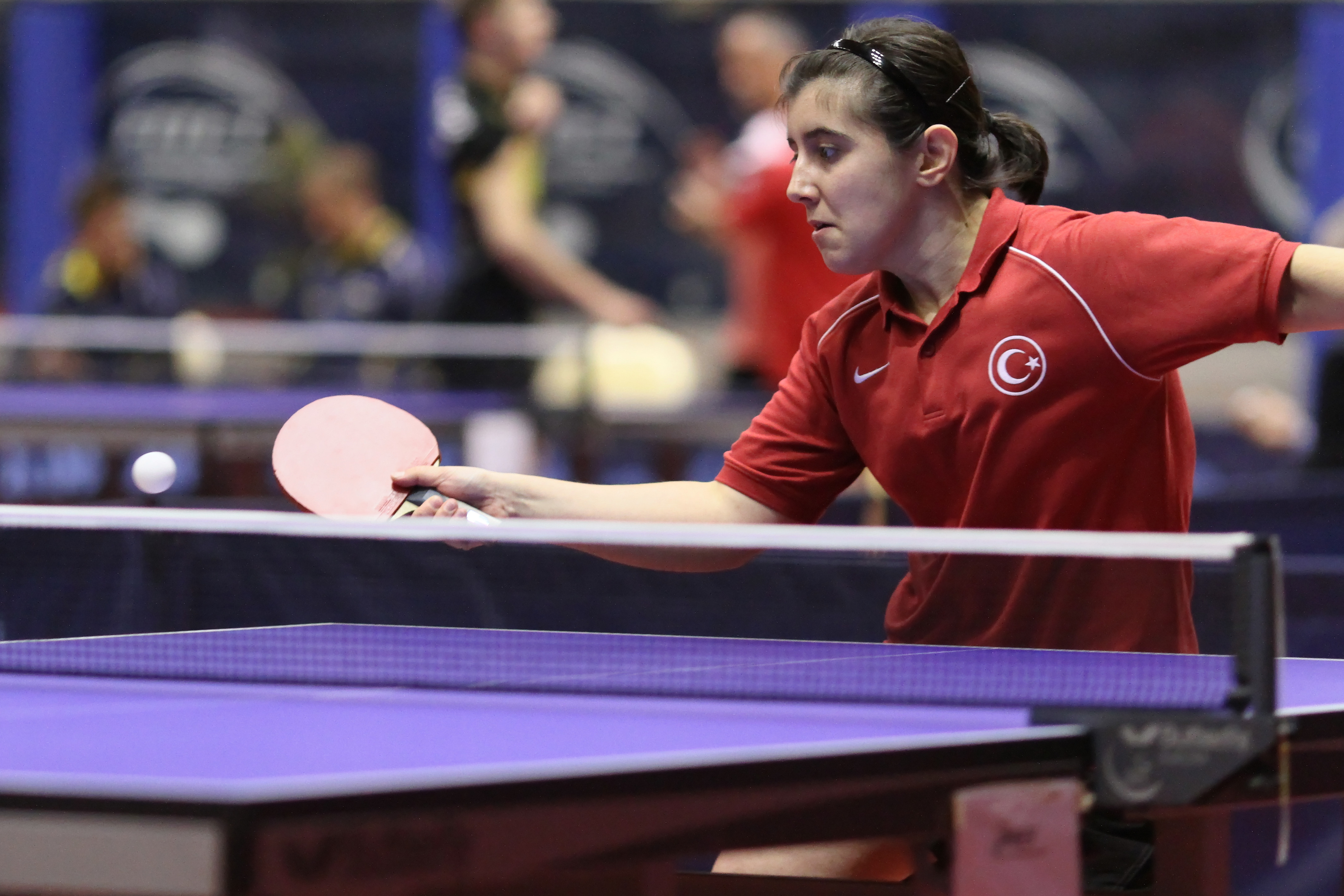

Personal information
- Nationality: Turkish
- Born: 29 August 1987 (age 38) Eskişehir, Turkey

Sport
- Country: Turkey
- Sport: Para table tennis
- Disability class: C9
- Club: Eskşehir Çağfen Spor Kulübü
- Coached by: Vildan Şensöz
Medal record
Women's table tennis (class 9)
Representing Turkey
Paralympic Games
Silver medal – second place	2012 London	Individual
Silver medal – second place	2012 London	Team
Bronze medal – third place	2008 Beijing	individual
European Championships
Gold medal – first place	2013 Italy	Individual
Islamic Solidarity Games
Gold medal – first place	2021 Konya	Individual
Gold medal – first place	2021 Konya	Team
- Updated on 4 October 2013

Neslihan Kavas (born 29 August 1987 in Eskişehir, Turkey) is a Turkish female para table tennis player of class 9 and Paralympian.

She represented Turkey at the 2008 Summer Paralympics, and won bronze by defeating Poland's Malgorzata Grzelak, three sets to nil (11–7, 11–4, 13–11).

Kavas took part at the 2012 Summer Paralympics and advanced to the final, at which she won the silver medal losing 2–3 to Chinese Lei Lina, champion of the 2008 Summer Paralympics. Furthermore, she was part of the Turkish team, which became silver medalist in the women's team class 6–10 event after losing to the team from China in the final.

She won the gold medal in the women's single class 9 division at the 2013 ITTF European Para-Table Tennis Championships held in Lignano, Italy.

== Achievements ==
Year	Competition	Venue	Position	Notes
Representing Turkey
2007	IPC European Championship	Slovakia	1st	individual
2007	IPC European Championship	Slovakia	3rd	team
2008	Summer Paralympics	Beijing, China	3rd	individual
2009	IPC European Championship	Italy	2nd	individual
2009	IPC European Championship	Italy	3rd	team
2010	IPC World Championship	South Korea	2nd	team
2011	IPC International Tournament	Slovenia	1st	individual
2011	IPC International Tournament	Slovenia	3rd	team
2011	IPC European Championship		1st	individual
2011	IPC European Championship		1st	team
2012	Summer Paralympics	London, United Kingdom	2nd	individual
2012	Summer Paralympics	London, United Kingdom	2nd	team
2013	ITTF European Championships	Lignano, Italy	1st	individual
