= Małgorzata Jankowska =

Polish para table tennis player

Personal information
- Born: Małgorzata Grzelak; 30 November 1983 (age 42) Warsaw, Poland

Sport
- Country: Poland
- Sport: Para table tennis
- Disability class: C9
Medal record
Para table tennis
Representing Poland
Paralympic Games
Silver medal – second place	2004 Athens	Teams C6-10
Silver medal – second place	2008 Beijing	Teams C6-10
Bronze medal – third place	2012 London	Teams C6-10
World Championships
Silver medal – second place	2006 Montreux	Teams C9-10
Silver medal – second place	2010 Gwangju	Singles C9
Silver medal – second place	2014 Beijing	Teams C9-10
Bronze medal – third place	2002 Taipei	Doubles C6-10
Bronze medal – third place	2010 Gwangju	Teams C9-10
European Championships
Gold medal – first place	1999 Piešťany	Teams C10
Gold medal – first place	2001 Frankfurt	Teams C10
Gold medal – first place	2005 Jesolo	Teams C9-10
Gold medal – first place	2007 Kranjska Gora	Teams C9-10
Gold medal – first place	2009 Genoa	Teams C9-10
Gold medal – first place	2015 Vejle	Teams C9-10
Silver medal – second place	2005 Jesolo	Singles C9
Silver medal – second place	2009 Genoa	Singles C9
Silver medal – second place	2011 Split	Teams C9-10
Bronze medal – third place	1999 Piešťany	Doubles C6-10
Bronze medal – third place	2003 Zagreb	Teams C6-9
Bronze medal – third place	2007 Kranjska Gora	Singles C9
Bronze medal – third place	2015 Vejle	Singles C9

Małgorzata Jankowska (née Grzelak, born 30 November 1983) is a Polish para table tennis player who competes at international table tennis competitions. She is a six-time European champion, five-time World medalist and three-time Paralympic medalist.
