= Table tennis at the 2020 Summer Paralympics – Qualification =

Qualification for table tennis at the 2020 Summer Paralympics began on 1 January 2019 and ended on 31 March 2021. There were 174 male athlete and 106 female athlete quotas in 31 events for the sport.

== Timeline ==
Competition	Date	Venue	Berths
2019 ITTF Oceania Para Championships	1–4 May 2019	(Australia) Darwin	150 qualified slots 55 male 50 female
2019 ITTF African Para Championships	30 June - 3 July 2019	(Egypt) Alexandria	150 qualified slots 55 male 50 female
2019 ITTF Asian Para Championships	23–27 July 2019	(Taiwan) Taichung	150 qualified slots 55 male 50 female
2019 Parapan American Games	22–27 August 2019	(Peru) Lima	150 qualified slots 55 male 50 female
2019 ITTF European Para Championships	16–21 September 2019	(Sweden) Helsingborg	150 qualified slots 55 male 50 female
World Ranking Allocation	1 January 2019 – 31 March 2020	—	100 qualified slots 72 males 28 females
ITTF PTT World Qualification Tournament	3–5 June 2021	(Slovenia) Laško	21 qualified slots 11 males 10 females
Bipartite Commission Invitation	TBD	-	50 qualified slots 36 males 14 females
Total			280

== Quotas ==
The qualification slots are allocated to the individual athlete not the NPC that they represent.

- An NPC can enter a maximum of three athletes in any of each individual medal event (33 male; 30 female).
- An NPC can enter one team (minimum of two, maximum of three from individual events) in any of each team event.

=== Men's events ===
As of July 2021.

Class 1

Competition	Berths	Qualified
Asian Para Championships	1	Joo Young-dae (KOR)
Parapan American Games	1	Yunier Fernández Izquierdo (CUB)
European Para Championships	1	~~Rob Davies (GBR)~~; Silvio Keller (SUI)
World Qualification Tournament	1	Dmitry Lavrov (RPC)
World Ranking Allocation	6	Nam Ki-won (KOR); Kim Hyeon-uk (KOR); Endre Major (HUN); Andrea Borgato (ITA); Federico Falco (ITA); Thomas Matthews (GBR)
Bipartite Commission Invitation	2	Fernando Eberhardt (ARG); Michael Godfrey (USA)
	12	

Class 2

Competition	Berths	Qualified
Asian Para Championships	1	Park Jin-cheol (KOR)
Parapan American Games	1	Víctor Reyes (MEX)
European Para Championships	1	Fabien Lamirault (FRA)
World Qualification Tournament	1	Thirayu Chueawong (THA)
World Ranking Allocation	10	Rafał Czuper (POL); Stéphane Molliens (FRA); Cha Soo-yong (KOR); Martin Ludrovský (SVK); Oleksandr Yezyk (UKR); Luis Bustamante Flores (CHI); Ján Riapoš (SVK); Jiří Suchánek (CZE); Goran Perlic (SRB); Iker Sastre (ESP)
Bipartite Commission Invitation	4	Tomasz Jakimczuk (POL); Rasul Nazirov (RPC); Nobuhiro Minami (JPN); Miguel Angel Toledo (ESP)
	18	

Class 3

Competition	Berths	Qualified
African Para Championships	1	Ahmed Owolabi Koleosho (NGR)
Asian Para Championships	1	Feng Panfeng (CHN)
Parapan American Games	1	Gabriel Copola (ARG)
European Para Championships	1	Thomas Schmidberger (GER)
World Qualification Tournament	1	Vladimir Toporkov (RPC)
World Ranking Allocation	11	Florian Merrien (FRA); Thomas Brüchle (GER); Carl Ohgren (SWE); Zhai Xiang (CHN); Yuttajak Glinbanchuen (THA); Zhao Ping (CHN); Welder Knaf (BRA); Vasyl Petruniv (UKR); Jenson Van Emburgh (USA); Anurak Laowong (THA); Baek Young-bok (KOR)
Bipartite Commission Invitation	5	Maciej Nalepka (POL); Matteo Orsi (ITA); Colin Judge (IRL); Petr Svatos (CZE); David Andrade de Freitas (BRA)
	21	

Class 4

Competition	Berths	Qualified
African Para Championships	1	Mohamed Sameh Eid Saleh (EGY)
Asian Para Championships	1	Kim Young-gun (KOR)
Parapan American Games	1	Cristián González (CHI)
European Para Championships	1	Abdullah Öztürk (TUR)
World Qualification Tournament	1	Boris Trávníček (SVK)
World Ranking Allocation	9	Maxime Thomas (FRA); Nesim Turan (TUR); Wanchai Chaiwut (THA); Kim Jung-gil (KOR); Zhang Yan (CHN); Krzysztof Żyłka (POL); Guo Xingyuan (CHN); Rafał Lis (POL); Isau Ogunkunle (NGR)
Bipartite Commission Invitation	4	Francisco Javier López Sayago (ESP); Peter Mihalik (SVK); Adyos Astan (INA); Filip Nachazel (CZE)
	18	

Class 5

Competition	Berths	Qualified
African Para Championships	1	Ayman Zenaty (EGY)
Asian Para Championships	1	Cao Ningning (CHN)
Parapan American Games	1	Mauro Depergola (ARG)
European Para Championships	1	Valentin Baus (GER)
World Qualification Tournament	1	Jack Hunter-Spivey (GBR)
World Ranking Allocation	5	Cheng Ming-chih (TPE); Tommy Urhaug (NOR); Mitar Palikuća (SRB); Ali Öztürk (TUR); Nicolas Savant-Aira (FRA)
Bipartite Commission Invitation	2	Hamza Çalışkan (TUR); Bart Brands (BEL)
	12	

Class 6

Competition	Berths	Qualified
Oceania Para Championships	1	Trevor Hirth (AUS)
African Para Championships	1	Ibrahim Hamadtou (EGY)
Asian Para Championships	1	Rungroj Thainiyom (THA)
Parapan American Games	1	~~Matias Pino (CHI)~~; Ian Seidenfeld (USA)
European Para Championships	1	Peter Rosenmeier (DEN)
World Qualification Tournament	1	Matteo Parenzan (ITA)
World Ranking Allocation	7	Álvaro Valera (ESP); David Wetherill (GBR); Park Hong-kyu (KOR); Thomas Rau (GER); Bobi Simion (ROU); Paul Karabardak (GBR); Chen Chao (CHN)
Bipartite Commission Invitation	3	Cristian Dettoni (CHI); Marios Chatzikyriakos (GRE); Haris Eminovic (BIH)
	16	

Class 7

Competition	Berths	Qualified
Oceania Para Championships	1	Jake Ballestrino (AUS)
African Para Championships	1	Sayed Youssef (EGY)
Asian Para Championships	1	Yan Shuo (CHN)
Parapan American Games	1	Paulo Salmin (BRA)
European Para Championships	1	~~Jean-Paul Montanus (NED)~~; Pavao Jozić (CRO)
World Qualification Tournament	1	Maksym Chudzicki (POL)
World Ranking Allocation	7	Will Bayley (GBR); Liao Keli (CHN); Jordi Morales (ESP); Israel Pereira Stroh (BRA); Katsuyoshi Yagi (JPN); Björn Schnake (GER); Chalermpong Punpoo (THA)
Bipartite Commission Invitation	3	Masachika Inoue (JPN); José David Vargas Pirajan (COL); Luka Trtnik (SLO)
	16	

Class 8

Competition	Berths	Qualified
Oceania Para Championships	1	Nathan Pellissier (AUS)
African Para Championships	1	Victor Farinloye (NGR)
Asian Para Championships	1	Peng Weinan (CHN)
Parapan American Games	1	Luiz Manara (BRA)
European Para Championships	1	Viktor Didukh (UKR)
World Qualification Tournament	1	Clément Berthier (FRA)
World Ranking Allocation	10	Zhao Shuai (CHN); Ross Wilson (GBR); Maksym Nikolenko (UKR); Emil Andersson (SWE); Aaron McKibbin (GBR); Ye Chaoqun (CHN); Piotr Grudzień (POL); Thomas Bouvais (FRA); András Csonka (HUN); Phisit Wangphonphatanasiri (THA)
Bipartite Commission Invitation	5	Linus Karlsson (SWE); Billy Shilton (GBR); Gyula Zborai (HUN); Komkrit Charitsat (THA); Steven Román Chinchilla (CRC)
	21	

Class 9

Competition	Berths	Qualified
Oceania Para Championships	1	Ma Lin (AUS)
African Para Championships	1	Tajudeen Agunbiade (NGR)
Asian Para Championships	1	Zhao Yi Qing (CHN)
Parapan American Games	1	Tahl Leibovitz (USA)
European Para Championships	1	Laurens Devos (BEL)
World Qualification Tournament	1	Ivan Mai (UKR)
World Ranking Allocation	5	Koyo Iwabuchi (JPN); Lev Kats (UKR); Mohamed Amine Kalem (ITA); Juan Bautista Perez (ESP); Joshua Stacey (GBR)
Bipartite Commission Invitation	3	Iurii Nozdrunov (RPC); Ashley Facey Thompson (GBR); Chee Chao Ming (MAS)
	14	

Class 10

Competition	Berths	Qualified
Oceania Para Championships	1	Joel Coughlan (AUS)
African Para Championships	1	Alabi Olabiyi Olufemi (NGR)
Asian Para Championships	1	Komet Akbar (INA)
Parapan American Games	1	Carlos Carbinatti (BRA)
European Para Championships	1	Patryk Chojnowski (POL)
World Qualification Tournament	1	Gilles de la Bourdonnaye (FRA)
World Ranking Allocation	5	David Jacobs (INA); Filip Radovic (MNE); José Manuel Ruiz Reyes (ESP); Krisztian Gardos (AUT); Matéo Bohéas (FRA)
Bipartite Commission Invitation	3	Lian Hao (CHN); Luka Bakic (MNE); Theo Cogill (RSA)
	14	

Class 11

Competition	Berths	Qualified
Oceania Para Championships	1	Samuel Von Einem (AUS)
Asian Para Championships	1	Takashi Asano (JPN)
Parapan American Games	1	Denisos Martínez (VEN)
European Para Championships	1	Florian Van Acker (BEL)
World Qualification Tournament	1	Koya Kato (JPN)
World Ranking Allocation	5	Péter Pálos (HUN); Lucas Créange (FRA); Eduardo Cuesta Martínez (ESP); Kim Gi-tae (KOR); Takeshi Takemori (JPN)
Bipartite Commission Invitation	2	Kim Chang-gi (KOR); Karim Gharsallah (TUN)
	12	

=== Women's events ===
As of July 2021.

Class 1-2

Competition	Berths	Qualified
Parapan American Games	1	Cátia Oliveira (BRA)
Asian Para Championships	1	Liu Jing (CHN)
European Para Championships	1	Giada Rossi (ITA)
World Qualification Tournament	1	Aino Tapola (FIN)
World Ranking Allocation	7	Maria Constanza Garrone (ARG); Isabelle Lafaye (FRA); Dorota Bucław (POL); Nadejda Pushpasheva (RUS); Ana Prvulovic (SRB); Seo Su Yeon (KOR); Chilchitraryak Bootwansirina (THA)
Bipartite Commission Invitation	1	Maryam Almyrisl (KSA)
	12	

Class 3

Competition	Berths	Qualified
Asian Para Championships	1	Lee Mi Gyu (KOR)
Parapan American Games	1	Edith Sigala (MEX)
European Para Championships	1	Anna-Carin Ahlquist (SWE)
World Qualification Tournament	1	Nergiz Altıntaş (TUR)
World Ranking Allocation	8	Li Qian (CHN); Xue Juan (CHN); Anđela Mužinić (CRO); Michela Brunelli (ITA); Alena Kanova (SVK); Yoon Jiyu (KOR); Dararat Asayut (THA); Hatice Duman (TUR)
Bipartite Commission Invitation	3	Marliane Amaral Santos (BRA); Helena Dretar (CRO); Sonalben Manubhai Patel (IND)
	15	

Class 4

Competition	Berths	Qualified
Oceania Para Championships	1	Daniela Di Toro (AUS)
Asian Para Championships	1	Zhou Ying (CHN)
Parapan American Games	1	Joyce de Oliveira (BRA)
European Para Championships	1	Borislava Peric-Rankovic (SRB)
World Qualification Tournament	1	Sue Gilroy (GBR)
World Ranking Allocation	7	Gu Xiaodan (CHN); Zhang Miao (CHN); Sandra Mikolaschek (GER); Megan Shackleton (GBR); Bhavina Hasmukhbhai Patel (IND); Nada Matic (SRB); Wijittra Jaion (THA)
Bipartite Commission Invitation	3	Faten Elelimat (JOR); Aleksandra Vasileva (RUS); Lu Pi-chun (TPE)
	15	

Class 5

Competition	Berths	Qualified
African Para Championships	1	Faiza Mahmoud (EGY)
Asian Para Championships	1	Zhang Bian (CHN)
Parapan American Games	1	Tamara Leonelli (CHI)
European Para Championship	1	Ingela Lundbäck (SWE)
World Qualification Tournament	1	Panwas Sringam (THA)
World Ranking Allocation	3	Pan Jiamin (CHN); Khetam Abuawad (JOR); Jung Young A (KOR)
Bipartite Commission Invitation	1	Caroline Tabib (ISR)
	9	

Class 6

Competition	Berths	Qualified
Oceania Para Championships	1	Rebecca Julian (AUS)
African Para Championships	1	Hanna Hammad (EGY)
Asian Para Championships	1	Lee Kun Woo (KOR)
European Para Championships	1	Maliak Alieva (RUS)
World Qualification Tournament	1	Moon Sung Keum (KOR)
World Ranking Allocation	3	Stephanie Grebe (GER); Raisa Chebanika (RUS); Maryna Lytovchenko (UKR)
Bipartite Commission Invitation	1	Najlah Imad Lafta Al Dayyeni (IRQ)
	9	

Class 7

Competition	Berths	Qualified
Asian Para Championships	1	Wang Rui (CHN)
Parapan American Games	1	Claudia Perez Villalba (MEX)
European Para Championships	1	Kelly van Zon (NED)
World Qualification Tournament	1	Nora Korneliussen (NOR)
World Ranking Allocation	4	Anne Barnéoud (FRA); Victoriya Safonova (RUS); Kim Seongok (KOR); Kubra Korkut (TUR)
Bipartite Commission Invitation	1	Millena Franca dos Santos (BRA)
	9	

Class 8

Competition	Berths	Qualified
Parapan American Games	1	Lethicia Lacerda (BRA)
Asian Para Championships	1	Mao Jingdian (CHN)
European Para Championships	1	Thu Kamkasomphou (FRA)
World Qualification Tournament	1	Zsofia Arloy (HUN)
World Ranking Allocation	3	Huang Wenjuan (CHN); Juliane Wolf (GER); Aida Dahlen (NOR)
Bipartite Commission Invitation	1	Frederique van Hoof (NED)
	8	

Class 9

Competition	Berths	Qualified
Oceania Para Championships	1	Lei Li Na (AUS)
Asian Para Championships	1	Xiong Guiyan (CHN)
Parapan American Games	1	Danielle Rauen (BRA)
European Para Championships	1	Alexa Szvitacs (HUN)
World Qualification Tournament	1	Jennyfer Marques Parinos (BRA)
World Ranking Allocation	2	Karolina Pęk (POL); Neslihan Kavas (TUR)
Bipartite Commission Invitation	1	Kim Kun-hea (KOR)
	8	

Class 10

Competition	Berths	Qualified
Oceania Para Championships	1	Melissa Tapper (AUS)
African Para Championships	1	Faith Obazuaye (NGR)
Parapan American Games	1	Bruna Costa Alexandre (BRA)
Asian Para Championships	1	Zhao Xiaojing (CHN)
European Para Championships	1	Natalia Partyka (POL)
World Qualification Tournament	1	Merve Demir (TUR)
World Ranking Allocation	2	Yang Qian (AUS); Tien Shiau-wen (TPE)
Bipartite Commission Invitation	1	Lin Tzu Yu (TPE)
	10	

Class 11

Competition	Berths	Qualified
Asian Para Championships	1	Ng Mui Wui (HKG)
European Para Championships	1	Elena Prokofeva (RUS)
World Qualification Tournament	1	Lea Ferney (FRA)
World Ranking Allocation	4	Wong Ting Ting (HKG); Kanami Furukawa (JPN); Krystyna Łysiak (POL); Natalia Kosmina (UKR)
Bipartite Commission Invitation	1	Maki Ito (JPN)
	8	

== See also ==
- Table tennis at the 2020 Summer Olympics – Qualification
