= Poland at the 2020 Summer Paralympics =

- Flag of Poland
- IPC code: POL
- NPC: Polish Paralympic Committee
- Website: www.paralympic.org.pl

in Tokyo, Japan August 24, 2021 – September 5, 2021
- Competitors: 89 in 12 sports
- Flag bearers: Maciej Lepiato and Joanna Mendak
- Medals: Gold 7 Silver 6 Bronze 11 Total 24

Summer Paralympics appearances (overview)
- 1972; 1976; 1980; 1984; 1988; 1992; 1996; 2000; 2004; 2008; 2012; 2016; 2020; 2024

Poland competed at the 2020 Summer Paralympics in Tokyo, Japan, from 24 August to 5 September 2021.

== Medalists ==
Medal	Name	Sport	Event	Date
Gold	Róża Kozakowska	Athletics	Women's club throw F32	27 August
Gold	Patryk Chojnowski	Table tennis	Men's individual class 10	29 August
Gold	Piotr Kosewicz	Athletics	Men's discus throw F52	29 August
Gold	Barbara Niewiedział	Athletics	Women's 1500 metres T20	3 September
Gold	Natalia Partyka; Karolina Pęk	Table tennis	Women's team class 9–10	3 September
Gold	Karolina Kucharczyk	Athletics	Women's long jump T20	3 September
Gold	Renata Śliwińska	Athletics	Women's shot put F40	4 September
Silver	Adrian Castro	Wheelchair fencing	Men's sabre B	25 August
Silver	Michał Derus	Athletics	Men's 100 metres T47	27 August
Silver	Rafał Czuper	Table tennis	Men's individual class 2	30 August
Silver	Lucyna Kornobys	Athletics	Women's shot put F34	31 August
Silver	Róża Kozakowska	Athletics	Women's shot put F32	1 September
Silver	Szymon Sowiński	Shooting	Mixed P3 25 metre pistol SH1	2 September
Bronze	Justyna Kozdryk	Powerlifting	Women's 45 kg	26 August
Bronze	Lech Stoltman	Athletics	Men's shot put F55	27 August
Bronze	Maksym Chudzicki	Table tennis	Men's individual class 7	28 August
Bronze	Karolina Pęk	Table tennis	Women's individual class 9	28 August
Bronze	Natalia Partyka	Table tennis	Women's individual class 10	28 August
Bronze	Marzena Zięba	Powerlifting	Women's +86 kg	30 August
Bronze	Renata Kałuża	Cycling	Women's road time trial H1–3	31 August
Bronze	Oliwia Jabłońska	Swimming	Women's 400 metre freestyle S10	1 September
Bronze	Rafał Czuper; Tomasz Jakimczuk	Table tennis	Men's team class 1–2	1 September
Bronze	Maciej Lepiato	Athletics	Men's high jump T64	3 September
Bronze	Alicja Jeromin	Athletics	Women's 200 metres T47	4 September

== Archery ==
Łukasz Ciszek and Milena Olszewska have both qualified to compete.

Men

Athlete	Event	Ranking round		Round of 32	Round of 16	Quarterfinals	Semifinals	Final / BM	
Athlete	Event	Score	Seed	Opposition Score	Opposition Score	Opposition Score	Opposition Score	Opposition Score	Rank
Łukasz Ciszek	Men's individual Recurve open	585	24	Savaş (TUR); L 4-6	Did not advance				

Women

Athlete	Event	Ranking round		Round of 32	Round of 16	Quarterfinals	Semifinals	Final / BM	
Athlete	Event	Score	Seed	Opposition Score	Opposition Score	Opposition Score	Opposition Score	Opposition Score	Rank
Milena Olszewska	Women's individual Recurve open	581	10	Selengee (MGL); W 6-4	Poimenidou (GRE); L 2-6	Did not advance			

== Athletics ==
Men's track

Athlete	Event	Heats		Final	
Athlete	Event	Result	Rank	Result	Rank
Krzysztof Ciuksza	400m T36	—		55.90	5
Michał Derus	100m T47	10.73	2 Q	10.61	2nd place, silver medalist(s)
Aleksander Kossakowski	1500m T11	4:29.92	5	did not advance	
Michał Kotkowski	400m T37	—		50.60	4
Daniel Pek	1500m T20	—		4:01.00	7

Men's field

Athlete	Event	Final	
Athlete	Event	Result	Rank
Michał Głąb	Shot put F33	8.88	6
Robert Jachimowicz	Discus throw F52	19.49	5
Piotr Kosewicz	Discus throw F52	20.02	1st place, gold medalist(s)
Maciej Lepiato	High jump T63	2.04	3rd place, bronze medalist(s)
Mirosław Madzia	Discus throw F11	29.46	9
Łukasz Mamczarz	High jump T63	1.80	4
Mateusz Owczarek	Long jump T37	5.85	7
Tomasz Pauliński	Shot put F34	11.09	4
Rafał Rocki	Discus throw F52	19.51	4
Janusz Rokicki	Shot put F57	13.53	6
Tomasz Ściubak	Shot put F37	13.38	8
Maciej Sochal	Club throw F32	32.66	6
Lech Stoltman	Shot put F55	12.15	3rd place, bronze medalist(s)
Bartosz Tyszkowski	Shot put F41	12.28	5
Marek Wietecki	Javelin throw F13	58.89	6
Marek Wietecki	Shot put F12	13.47	6

Women's track

Athlete	Events	Heat		Semifinal		Final	
Athlete	Events	Result	Rank	Result	Rank	Result	Rank
Barbara Bieganowska	1500m T20	—				4:27.84	1st place, gold medalist(s)
Justyna Franieczek	400m T20	59.50	3 Q	—		59.14	5
Alicja Jeromin	100m T47	12.19	2 Q	—		12.22	4
Alicja Jeromin	200m T47	25.06	1 Q	—		25.05	3rd place, bronze medalist(s)
Jagoda Kibil	100m T35	15.64	5 q	—		15.38	5
Jagoda Kibil	200m T35	—				31.75	4
Joanna Mazur	100m T11	1:01.50	7 q	1:01.82	8	did not advance	
Joanna Mazur	200m T11	28.40	3	did not advance			
Joanna Mazur	400m T11	1:01.50	3 Q	1:01.82	4	did not advance	

Women's field

Athlete	Event	Final	
Athlete	Event	Result	Rank
Lucyna Kornobys	Shot put F34	8.60	2nd place, silver medalist(s)
Faustyna Kotłowska	Discus throw F64	33.40	7
Róża Kozakowska	Club throw F32	28.74 WR	1st place, gold medalist(s)
Karolina Kucharczyk	Long jump T20	6.03 PR	1st place, gold medalist(s)
Klaudia Maliszewska	Shot put F35	8.39	5
Joanna Oleksiuk	Javelin throw F34	12.09	9
Joanna Oleksiuk	Shot put F33	6.40	4
Marta Piotrowska	Long jump T37	4.28	6
Renata Śliwińska	Discus throw F40	24.70	8
Renata Śliwińska	Shot put F40	8.75 PR	1st place, gold medalist(s)

== Badminton ==
Bartłomiej Mróz has qualified to compete.

Athlete	Event	Group stage				Semifinal	Final / BM	
Athlete	Event	Opposition Score	Opposition Score	Opposition Score	Rank	Opposition Score	Opposition Score	Rank
Bartłomiej Mróz	Men's singles SU5	Loquette (FRA); L (16–21, 17–21)	Nugroho (INA); L (13–21, 10–21)	Anrimusthi (INA); L (17–21, 7–21)	4	did not advance		

== Cycling ==
Krystian Giera, Renata Kałuża, Justyna Kiryla, Marcin Polak, Dominika Putyra, Rafał Szumiec and Rafał Wilk have all qualified to compete.

=== Track ===
Women

Athlete	Event	Qualification		Final	
Athlete	Event	Time	Rank	Opposition Time	Rank
Dominika Putyra (Ewa Bankowska - pilot)	Women's time trial B	—		1:13.212	8
Dominika Putyra (Ewa Bankowska - pilot)	Women's individual pursuit B	3:26.483	5	did not advanced	
Justyna Kiryla (Aleksandra Tecław - pilot)	Women's time trial B	—		1:12.354	7
Justyna Kiryla (Aleksandra Tecław - pilot)	Women's individual pursuit B	3:31.875	6	did not advanced	

== Equestrian ==
Poland qualified one athlete.

== Paracanoeing ==
Poland has qualified two athlete in men's VL2 & women's KL3 events, Katarzyna Kozikowska, Kamila Kubas, Mateusz Surwiło and Jakub Tokarz.

== Powerlifting ==
Justyna Kozdryk, Grzegorz Lanzer, Paulina Przywecka-Puziak, Sławomir Szymański, Mariusz Tomczyk and Marzena Zięba have all qualified to compete.

Men

Athlete	Event	Total lifted	Rank
Sławomir Szymański	Men's –49 kg	136	8
Mariusz Tomczyk	Men's –59 kg	161	8
Grzegorz Lanzer	Men's –69 kg	166	4

Women

Athlete	Event	Total lifted	Rank
Justyna Kozdryk	Women's –45 kg	101	3rd place, bronze medalist(s)
Marzena Zięba	Women + 86 kg		3

== Rowing ==
Poland qualified one boat in the mixed double sculls for the games by finishing sixth at A-final and securing the six of eight available place at the 2019 World Rowing Championships in Ottensheim, Austria.

Athlete	Event	Heats		Repechage		Final	
Athlete	Event	Time	Rank	Time	Rank	Time	Rank
Michał Gadowski; Jolanta Majka	Mixed double sculls	9:04.15	4 R	8:11.98	2 FA	9:29.81	6

Qualification Legend: FA=Final A (medal); FB=Final B (non-medal); R=Repechage

== Shooting ==
Poland entered three shooters into the Paralympics.

Athlete	Event	Qualification		Final	
Athlete	Event	Score	Rank	Score	Rank
Filip Rodzik	Men's P1 – 10 m air pistol SH1	555-10x	17	did not advanced	
Filip Rodzik	Mixed P3 – 25 m pistol SH1	544-8x	23	did not advanced	
Filip Rodzik	Mixed P4 – 50 m pistol SH1	502-3x	31	did not advanced	
Szymon Sowiński	Men's P1 – 10 m air pistol SH1	566-12x	7	156.4	6
Szymon Sowiński	Mixed P3 – 25 m pistol SH1	573-15x	5	21	2nd place, silver medalist(s)
Szymon Sowiński	Mixed P4 – 50 m pistol SH1	532-2x	9	did not advanced	
Emilia Babska	Women's R2 – 10 m air rifle standing SH1	616.9	10	did not advanced	
Emilia Babska	Mixed R6 – 10 m air rifle prone SH1	628.1	35	did not advanced	
Emilia Babska	Mixed R6 – 50 m rifle prone SH1	612.7	25	did not advanced	

== Swimming ==
Nine Polish swimmers qualified to compete at the Games.

Men

Athlete	Event	Heats		Final	
Athlete	Event	Result	Rank	Result	Rank
Jacek Czech	100 m backstroke S2	2:14.25	6 Q	2:12.53	4
Przemysław Drąg					
Michał Golus	100 m freestyle S8	1:01.26	9	did not advance	
Igor Hrehorowicz	400 m freestyle S9	4:26.13	8 Q	4:24.75	=7
Wojciech Makowski	50 m freestyle S11	27.92	7 Q	27.83	7
Wojciech Makowski	100 m backstroke S11				
Alan Ogorzałek	100 m freestyle S10				
Kamil Otowski	100 m backstroke S2	2:12.80	5 Q	2:15.09	6

Women

Athlete	Event	Heats		Final	
Athlete	Event	Result	Rank	Result	Rank
Oliwia Jabłońska	100 m freestyle S10				
Joanna Mendak	100 m butterfly S13	1:08.41	9	did not advance	

== Table tennis ==
Poland entered nine athletes into the table tennis competition at the games. Patryk Chojnowski & Natalia Partyka qualified from 2019 ITTF European Para Championships which was held in Helsingborg, Sweden and other seven athletes via World Ranking allocation.

Men

Athlete	Event	Group Stage			Round 1	Quarterfinals	Semifinals	Final	
Athlete	Event	Opposition Result	Opposition Result	Rank	Opposition Result	Opposition Result	Opposition Result	Opposition Result	Rank
Rafał Czuper	Individual C2	Nazirov (RPC); W 3-0	Sastre (ESP); W 3-0	1 Q	—	Suchánek (CZE); W 3-1	Park (KOR); W 3-1	Lamirault (FRA); L 2-3	2nd place, silver medalist(s)
Tomasz Jakimczuk	Individual C2	Lamirault (FRA); L 0-3	Suchánek (CZE); L 0-3	3	did not advance				
Maciej Nalepka	Individual C3	Feng (CHN); L 0-3	Orsi (ITA); W 3-1	2 Q	Xiang (CHN); L 1-3	did not advance			
Rafał Lis	Individual C4	Ozturk (TUR); L 0-3	Astan (INA); L 1-3	3	did not advance				
Krzysztof Żyłka	Individual C4	Kim (KOR); L 1-3	Nachazel (CZE); W 3-0	1 Q	Chaiwut (THA); W 3-0	Thomas (FRA); L 1-3	did not advance		
Maksym Chudzicki	Individual C7	Bayley (GBR); L 1-3	Punpoo (THA); W 3-0	2 Q	Morales (ESP); W 3-0	—	Yan (CHN); L 0-3	did not advance	3rd place, bronze medalist(s)
Piotr Grudzień	Individual C8	McKibbin (GBR); W 3-0	Pellissier (AUS); W 3-0	1 Q	Shilton (GBR); L 2-3	did not advance			
Patryk Chojnowski	Individual C10	Akbar (INA); W 3-0	de la Bourdonnaye (FRA); W 3-1	1 Q	—	Bakić (MNE); W 3-0	Radović (MNE); W 3-1	Boheas (FRA); W 3-0	1st place, gold medalist(s)

Women

Athlete	Event	Group				Round of 16	Quarterfinals	Semifinals	Final	Rank
Athlete	Event	Opposition Result	Opposition Result	Opposition Result	Rank	Opposition Result	Opposition Result	Opposition Result	Rank	Rank
Dorota Bucław	Individual C1-2	da Silva Oliveira (BRA); W 3-1	Tapola (FIN); W 3-0	—	1 Q	—	Pushpasheva (RPC); L 1-3	did not advance		
Karolina Pęk	Individual C9	Kim (KOR); W 3-1	Lei (AUS); L 1-3	Marques Parinos (BRA); W 3-1	2 Q	—		Xiong (CHN); L 1-3	did not advance	3rd place, bronze medalist(s)
Natalia Partyka	Individual C10	Takeuchi (JPN); W 3-0	Demir (TUR); W 3-1	—	1 Q	—		Yang (AUS); L 2-3	did not advance	3rd place, bronze medalist(s)
Krystyna Łysiak	Individual C11	Prokofeva (RPC); L 0-3	Ito (JPN); L 0-3	Ng (HKG); W 3-2	4	did not advance				

== Wheelchair fencing ==
Adrian Castro, Kinga Dróżdż, Patricia Haręza, Michal Nalewajek, Dariusz Pender and Grzegorz Pluta have all qualified to compete.

Men

Athlete	Event	Qualification			Round of 16	Quarterfinal	Semifinal	Final / BM	
Athlete	Event	Opposition	Score	Rank	Opposition Score	Opposition Score	Opposition Score	Opposition Score	Rank
Adrian Castro	Men's individual sabre B	Triantafyllou (GRE)	L 4–5	1 Q	—	Tarjanyi (HUN); W 15–4	Triantafyllou (GRE); W 15–9	Feng (CHN); L 11–15	2nd place, silver medalist(s)
Adrian Castro	Men's individual sabre B	Kamalov (RPC)	W 5–3	1 Q	—	Tarjanyi (HUN); W 15–4	Triantafyllou (GRE); W 15–9	Feng (CHN); L 11–15	2nd place, silver medalist(s)
Adrian Castro	Men's individual sabre B	Ali (IRQ)	W 4–2	1 Q	—	Tarjanyi (HUN); W 15–4	Triantafyllou (GRE); W 15–9	Feng (CHN); L 11–15	2nd place, silver medalist(s)
Adrian Castro	Men's individual sabre B	Feng (CHN)	W 5–3	1 Q	—	Tarjanyi (HUN); W 15–4	Triantafyllou (GRE); W 15–9	Feng (CHN); L 11–15	2nd place, silver medalist(s)
Adrian Castro	Men's individual sabre B	Onda (JPN)	W 5–1	1 Q	—	Tarjanyi (HUN); W 15–4	Triantafyllou (GRE); W 15–9	Feng (CHN); L 11–15	2nd place, silver medalist(s)
Grzegorz Pluta	Men's individual sabre B	Kurzin (RPC)	L 4–5	2 Q	—	Triantafyllou (GRE); L 13–15	did not advance		6
Grzegorz Pluta	Men's individual sabre B	Tarjanyi (HUN)	W 5–3	2 Q	—	Triantafyllou (GRE); L 13–15	did not advance		6
Grzegorz Pluta	Men's individual sabre B	Valet (FRA)	W 5–2	2 Q	—	Triantafyllou (GRE); L 13–15	did not advance		6
Grzegorz Pluta	Men's individual sabre B	Mainville (CAN)	W 5–0	2 Q	—	Triantafyllou (GRE); L 13–15	did not advance		6
Grzegorz Pluta	Men's individual sabre B	Chaves (BRA)	W 5–2	2 Q	—	Triantafyllou (GRE); L 13–15	did not advance		6
Dariusz Pender	Men's individual épée A	Manko (UKR)	L 4–5	7	did not advance				13
Dariusz Pender	Men's individual épée A	Noble (FRA)	L 1–5	7	did not advance				13
Dariusz Pender	Men's individual épée A	Gilliver (GBR)	L 1–5	7	did not advance				13
Dariusz Pender	Men's individual épée A	Giordan (ITA)	L 1–5	7	did not advance				13
Dariusz Pender	Men's individual épée A	Sun (CHN)	L 3–5	7	did not advance				13
Dariusz Pender	Men's individual épée A	Yusupov (RPC)	L 4–5	7	did not advance				13
Dariusz Pender; Michał Nalewajek; Grzegorz Pluta; Adrian Castro	Men's team épée	Ukraine (UKR)	L 32–45	4	—	did not advance			7
Dariusz Pender; Michał Nalewajek; Grzegorz Pluta; Adrian Castro	Men's team épée	France (FRA)	L 39–45	4	—	did not advance			7
Dariusz Pender; Michał Nalewajek; Grzegorz Pluta; Adrian Castro	Men's team épée	Great Britain (GBR)	L 30–45	4	—	did not advance			7

Women

Athlete	Event	Qualification			Round of 16	Quarterfinal	Semifinal	Final / BM	
Athlete	Event	Opposition	Score	Rank	Opposition Score	Opposition Score	Opposition Score	Opposition Score	Rank
Kinga Dróżdż	Women's individual sabre A	Morel (CAN)	W 5–0	2 Q	—	Hajmasi (HUN); L 14–15	did not advance		7
Kinga Dróżdż	Women's individual sabre A	Tibilasvhili (GEO)	W 5–1	2 Q	—	Hajmasi (HUN); L 14–15	did not advance		7
Kinga Dróżdż	Women's individual sabre A	Gu (CHN)	L 3–5	2 Q	—	Hajmasi (HUN); L 14–15	did not advance		7
Kinga Dróżdż	Women's individual sabre A	Sycheva (RPC)	W 5–3	2 Q	—	Hajmasi (HUN); L 14–15	did not advance		7
Kinga Dróżdż	Women's individual épée A	Rong (CHN)	L 3–5	5	did not advance				13
Kinga Dróżdż	Women's individual épée A	Evdokimova (RPC)	L 3–5	5	did not advance				13
Kinga Dróżdż	Women's individual épée A	Veres (HUN)	L 3–5	5	did not advance				13
Kinga Dróżdż	Women's individual épée A	Matsumoto (JPN)	W 5–3	5	did not advance				13
Kinga Dróżdż	Women's individual épée A	Collis-McCann (GBR)	L 4–5	5	did not advance				13
Marta Fidrych	Women's individual sabre A	Collis-McCann (GBR)	W 5–1	3 Q	Veres (HUN); W 15–10	Bian (CHN); L 9–15	did not advance		8
Marta Fidrych	Women's individual sabre A	Morkvych (UKR)	L 1–5	3 Q	Veres (HUN); W 15–10	Bian (CHN); L 9–15	did not advance		8
Marta Fidrych	Women's individual sabre A	Mogos (ITA)	W 5–1	3 Q	Veres (HUN); W 15–10	Bian (CHN); L 9–15	did not advance		8
Marta Fidrych	Women's individual sabre A	Hajmasi (HUN)	L 1–5	3 Q	Veres (HUN); W 15–10	Bian (CHN); L 9–15	did not advance		8
Marta Fidrych	Women's individual épée A	Jensen (USA)	L 4–5	5	did not advance				14
Marta Fidrych	Women's individual épée A	Ng (HKG)	L 3–5	5	did not advance				14
Marta Fidrych	Women's individual épée A	Bian (CHN)	L 2–5	5	did not advance				14
Marta Fidrych	Women's individual épée A	Breus (UKR)	L 4–5	5	did not advance				14
Patrycja Haręza	Women's individual épée B	Hayes (USA)	W 5–1	5 Q	Vasileva (RPC); L 7–15	did not advance			9
Patrycja Haręza	Women's individual épée B	Zhou (CHN)	L 4–5	5 Q	Vasileva (RPC); L 7–15	did not advance			9
Patrycja Haręza	Women's individual épée B	Boykova (RPC)	L 2–5	5 Q	Vasileva (RPC); L 7–15	did not advance			9
Patrycja Haręza	Women's individual épée B	Anri Sakurai (JPN)	L 2–5	5 Q	Vasileva (RPC); L 7–15	did not advance			9
Patrycja Haręza	Women's individual épée B	Chung (HKG)	W 5–1	5 Q	Vasileva (RPC); L 7–15	did not advance			9
Patrycja Haręza	Women's individual épée B	Makrytskaya (BLR)	L 2–5	5 Q	Vasileva (RPC); L 7–15	did not advance			9
Kinga Dróżdż; Marta Fidrych; Patrycja Haręza	Women's team épée	RPC (RPC)	L 31–44	3	—	did not advance			6
Kinga Dróżdż; Marta Fidrych; Patrycja Haręza	Women's team épée	Hong Kong (HKG)	L 40–45	3	—	did not advance			6

== Wheelchair tennis ==
Poland qualified two player entries for wheelchair tennis. One of them qualified through the world rankings, while the other qualified under the bipartite commission invitation allocation quota.

Athlete	Event	Round of 64	Round of 32	Round of 16	Quarterfinals	Semifinals	Final / BM	
Athlete	Event	Opposition Result	Opposition Result	Opposition Result	Opposition Result	Opposition Result	Opposition Result	Rank
Kamil Fabisiak	Men's singles	Khlongrua (THA) W 4-6, 6-2 6-1	Hewett (GBR)					
Piotr Jaroszewski	Men's singles	Sepulveda (CHI); W 1-6, 6-4 6-4	de la Puente (ESP)					
Kamil Fabisiak; Piotr Jaroszewski	Men's doubles	—	Cataldo / Sepulveda (CHI)					

== See also ==
- Poland at the Paralympics
- Poland at the 2020 Summer Olympics
