= Chinese Taipei at the 2020 Summer Paralympics =

- Chinese Taipei Paralympic flag
- IPC code: TPE
- NPC: Chinese Taipei Paralympic Committee

in Tokyo
- Competitors: 10 in 6 sports
- Flag bearers: Yang Chuan-hui; Lin Ya-hsuan
- Medals Ranked 78th: Gold 0 Silver 0 Bronze 1 Total 1

Summer Paralympics appearances (overview)
- 1992; 1996; 2000; 2004; 2008; 2012; 2016; 2020; 2024

Chinese Taipei competed at the 2020 Summer Paralympics in Tokyo, Japan, from 24 August to 5 September 2021.

== Medalists ==
Medal	Name	Sport	Event	Date
Bronze	Tien Shiau-wen	Table tennis	Women's individual class 10	28 August

== Competitors ==
The following is the list of number of competitors participating in the Games:

Sport	Men	Women	Total
Athletics	1	1	2
Badminton	1	0	1
Judo	0	1	1
Powerlifting	0	1	1
Swimming	1	0	1
Table Tennis	1	3	4
Total	4	6	10

== Athletics ==
Two athletes from Chinese Taipei have qualified to compete at the Games.

Athlete	Event	Final	
Athlete	Event	Result	Rank
Yang Chuan-hui	Men's long jump T11	6.07	4
Liu Ya-ting	Women's javelin throw F13	32.44	6

== Badminton ==
Chinese Taipei entered one badminton player in the following event at the Games. This will be the first time that para badminton is included in the Games. Each event starts with a round-robin group play stage, with the top two players (teams) advancing to the quarterfinals or semifinals, depending on the total number of players (teams) in the event.

Athlete	Event	Group Stage				Semifinal	Bronze Medal Match	
Athlete	Event	Opposition Score	Opposition Score	Opposition Score	Rank	Opposition Score	Opposition Score	Rank
Fang Jen-yu	Men's singles SU5	Imai (JPN); W (21–16, 17–21, 21–10)	Cheah (MAS); L (13–21, 9–21)	Eldakrory (EGY); W (21–6, 21–2)	2 Q	Cheah (MAS); L (21–15, 10–21, 16–21)	Suryo (INA); L (16–21, 9–21)	4

== Judo ==
Having won the silver medal at the 2012 Summer Paralympics, Lee Kai-lin was qualified to compete in the women's 48 kg weight class for a third consecutive time by virtue of her IBSF world ranking as of June 2021.

Athlete	Event	Seed	Preliminaries	Quarterfinals	Semifinals	Repechage		Final / BM	
Athlete	Event	Seed	Opposition Result	Opposition Result	Opposition Result	Opposition Result	Opposition Result	Opposition Result	Rank
Lee Kai-lin	Women's –48kg	4	Bye	Ivanytska (UKR); L 000–010	Did not advance	Bye	Li (CHN); W 100–000	Potapova (RPC); L 000–100	5

== Powerlifting ==
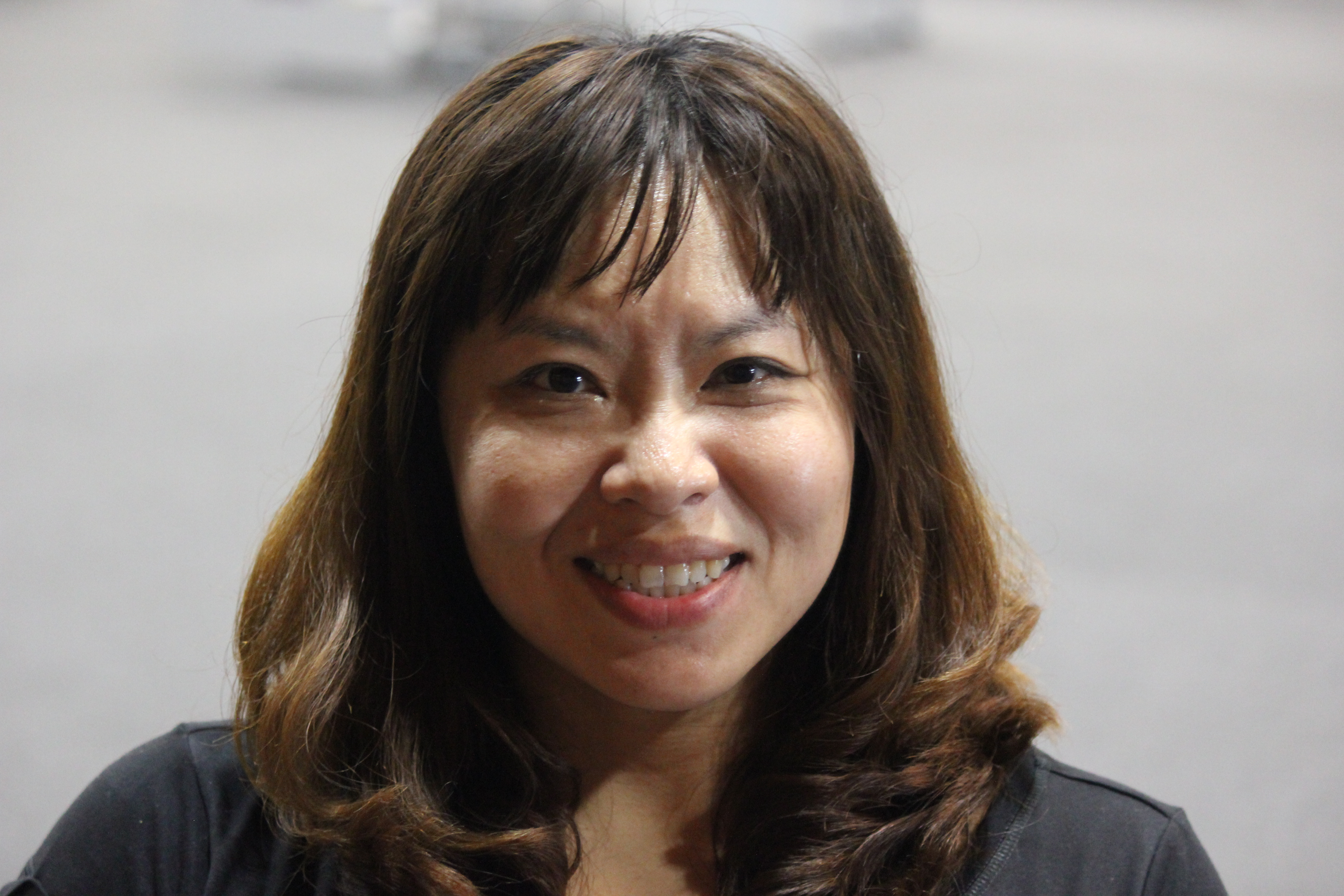
Lin Ya-hsuan at the 2016 Summer Paralympics

Lin Ya-hsuan will compete in the Paralympics for the fifth consecutive time. The best outcome out of three attempts counted as the final results. The athlete who placed first in each event was allowed a fourth attempt to break the Paralympic or world record.

Athlete	Event	Body weight (kg)	Attempts (kg)				Result (kg)	Place
Athlete	Event	Body weight (kg)	1	2	3	4	Result (kg)	Place
Lin Ya-hsuan	Women's –61 kg	60.05	73	78	~~81~~	–	78	7

== Swimming ==
Men

Athlete	Events	Heats		Final	
Athlete	Events	Time	Rank	Time	Rank
Chen Liang-da	100 m backstroke SM7	1:18.28	9	Did not advance	
Chen Liang-da	200 m medley SM7	2:54.22	11	Did not advance	
Chen Liang-da	400 m freestyle S7	5:15.89	8 Q	5:10.65	8

== Table tennis ==
Four Taiwanese table tennis players successfully got a slot through the World Ranking Allocation.

Men

Athlete	Event	Seed	Preliminaries			Quarterfinals	Semifinals	Final	
Athlete	Event	Seed	Opposition Result	Opposition Result	Rank	Opposition Result	Opposition Result	Opposition Result	Rank
Cheng Ming-chih	Individual C5	2	Brands (BEL); W 3–1	Hunter-Spivey (GBR); L 0–3	2 Q	Cao (CHN); L 0–3	Did not advance		5

Women

Athlete	Event	Seed	Preliminaries				Quarterfinals	Semifinals	Final	
Athlete	Event	Seed	Opposition Result	Opposition Result	Opposition Result	Rank	Opposition Result	Opposition Result	Opposition Result	Rank
Lu Pi-chun	Individual C4	10	Perić (SRB); L 0–3	Bailey (GBR); W 3–1	—N/a	2 Q	Gu (CHN); L 1–3	Did not advance		5
Lin Tzu-yu	Individual C10	8	Tapper (AUS); L 1–3	Alexandre (BRA); L 0–3	Bye	3	Did not advance			
Tien Shiau-wen	Individual C10	5	Obazuaye (NGR); W 3–0	Yang (AUS); W 3–0	Zhao (CHN); W 3–0	1 Q	Demir (TUR); W 3–1	Alexandre (BRA); L 1–3	Did not advance	3rd place, bronze medalist(s)
Lin Tzu-yu; Tien Shiau-wen	Teams C9-10	6	—N/a				China; L 0–2 (0–3, 0–3)	Did not advance		5

== See also ==
- Chinese Taipei at the Paralympics
- Chinese Taipei at the 2020 Summer Olympics
