= Table tennis at the 2020 Summer Paralympics =

Table tennis at the XVI Paralympic Games
- Table tennis pictogram of the 2020 Summer Paralympics
- Venue: Tokyo Metropolitan Gymnasium
- Dates: 25 August – 3 September 2021
- Competitors: 280 in 31 events from 53 nations

Table tennis at the 2020 Summer Paralympics in Tokyo, Japan took place at the Tokyo Metropolitan Gymnasium. There were 280 qualified slots (174 male, 106 female) for male and female events.

The 2020 Summer Olympic and Paralympic Games were postponed to 2021 due to the COVID-19 pandemic. They kept the 2020 name and were held from 24 August to 5 September 2021.

== Classification ==
There are 11 classifications in table tennis. Classes 1 – 5 are assigned to athletes who sit in a wheelchair while competing. Classes 6 – 10 are assigned to athletes who stands while competing. The lower number indicates a greater degree of impairment. Class 11 is for athletes with intellectual impairment.

== Events ==
31 events were contested. The events are men's and women's team and individual competitions for the various disability classifications.

- Men's singles
  - Class 1
  - Class 2
  - Class 3
  - Class 4
  - Class 5
  - Class 6
  - Class 7
  - Class 8
  - Class 9
  - Class 10
  - Class 11

- Men's team
  - Class 1–2
  - Class 3
  - Class 4–5
  - Class 6–7
  - Class 8
  - Class 9–10

- Women's singles
  - Class 1–2
  - Class 3
  - Class 4
  - Class 5
  - Class 6
  - Class 7
  - Class 8
  - Class 9
  - Class 10
  - Class 11

- Women's team
  - Class 1–3
  - Class 4–5
  - Class 6–8
  - Class 9–10

== Participating nations ==
As of 25 August 2021.

- Argentina (5)
- Australia (11)
- Austria (1)
- Belgium (3)
- Bosnia and Herzegovina (1)
- Brazil (14)
- Chile (4)
- China (27)
- Chinese Taipei (4)
- Colombia (1)
- Costa Rica (1)
- Croatia (3)
- Cuba (1)
- Czech Republic (3)
- Denmark (1)
- Egypt (6)
- Finland (1)
- France (14)
- Germany (8)
- Great Britain (13)
- Greece (1)
- Hong Kong (2)
- Hungary (6)
- India (2)
- Indonesia (3)
- Iraq (1)
- Ireland (1)
- Israel (1)
- Italy (7)
- Japan (11) (host country)
- Jordan (2)
- Malaysia (1)
- Mexico (3)
- Montenegro (2)
- Netherlands (2)
- Nigeria (6)
- Norway (3)
- Poland (12)
- Romania (1)
- RPC (10)
- Saudi Arabia (1)
- Serbia (5)
- Slovakia (5)
- Slovenia (1)
- South Africa (1)
- Spain (6)
- South Korea (19)
- Sweden (5)
- Thailand (12)
- Tunisia (1)
- Turkey (9)
- Ukraine (8)
- United States (4)
- Venezuela (1)

== Schedule ==
Q	Qualification	¼	Quarterfinals	½	Semifinals	F	Final

Men

Events	Dates												
Events	Wed 25 Aug	Thurs 26 Aug	Fri 27 Aug	Sat 28 Aug		Sun 29 Aug	Mon 30 Aug	Tues 31 Aug		Wed 1 Sept		Thurs 2 Sept	Fri 3 Sept
Men's individual C1	Q		¼	½			F						
Men's individual C2	Q		¼	½			F						
Men's individual C3	Q		¼	½	F								
Men's individual C4	Q		¼	½			F						
Men's individual C5	Q		¼	½		F							
Men's individual C6	Q		¼	½	F								
Men's individual C7	Q		¼	½	F								
Men's individual C8	Q			½			F						
Men's individual C9	Q		¼	½	F								
Men's individual C10	Q			½		F							
Men's individual C11	Q		¼	½		F							
Men's team C1-2								Q	¼		½		F
Men's team C3								Q		¼	½	F	
Men's team C4-5								Q	¼	½		F	
Men's team C6-7								Q		¼	½		F
Men's team C8								Q	¼		½	F	
Men's team C9-10								Q	¼	½			F

Women

Events	Dates													
Events	Wed 25 Aug	Thurs 26 Aug	Fri 27 Aug		Sat 28 Aug		Sun 29 Aug	Mon 30 Aug	Tues 31 Aug		Wed 1 Sept		Thurs 2 Sept	Fri 3 Sept
Women's individual C1-2	Q		¼		½	F								
Women's individual C3	Q			¼	½		F							
Women's individual C4	Q			¼	½	F								
Women's individual C5	Q			¼	½		F							
Women's individual C6	Q		¼	½			F							
Women's individual C7	Q				½			F						
Women's individual C8	Q				½		F							
Women's individual C9	Q			½		F								
Women's individual C10	Q					½		F						
Women's individual C11	Q				½	F								
Women's team C1-3									Q	¼	½		F	
Women's team C4-5									Q		¼	½		F
Women's team C6-8									Q	¼	½		F	
Women's team C9-10									Q		¼	½		F

== Medal table ==
* Host nation (Japan)

Rank	Nation	Gold	Silver	Bronze	Total
1	China (CHN)	16	4	6	26
2	Australia (AUS)	2	4	0	6
3	France (FRA)	2	2	7	11
4	Poland (POL)	2	1	4	7
5	South Korea (KOR)	1	6	6	13
6	RPC (RPC)	1	2	4	7
7	Ukraine (UKR)	1	2	3	6
8	Germany (GER)	1	2	2	5
9	Netherlands (NED)	1	1	0	2
10	Turkey (TUR)	1	0	3	4
11	Belgium (BEL)	1	0	1	2
11	Hungary (HUN)	1	0	1	2
11	United States (USA)	1	0	1	2
14	Great Britain (GBR)	0	2	5	7
15	Brazil (BRA)	0	1	2	3
15	Slovakia (SVK)	0	1	2	3
17	Denmark (DEN)	0	1	0	1
17	India (IND)	0	1	0	1
17	Sweden (SWE)	0	1	0	1
20	Thailand (THA)	0	0	2	2
21	Chinese Taipei (TPE)	0	0	1	1
21	Croatia (CRO)	0	0	1	1
21	Czech Republic (CZE)	0	0	1	1
21	Hong Kong (HKG)	0	0	1	1
21	Indonesia (INA)	0	0	1	1
21	Italy (ITA)	0	0	1	1
21	Japan (JPN)*	0	0	1	1
21	Jordan (JOR)	0	0	1	1
21	Montenegro (MNE)	0	0	1	1
21	Nigeria (NGR)	0	0	1	1
21	Norway (NOR)	0	0	1	1
21	Serbia (SRB)	0	0	1	1
21	Spain (ESP)	0	0	1	1
Totals (33 entries)		31	31	62	124

== Medalists ==
=== Men ===
Event	Class	Gold	Silver	Bronze
Men's individual	1	Joo Young-dae; South Korea	Kim Hyeon-uk; South Korea	Nam Ki-won; South Korea
Men's individual	1	Joo Young-dae; South Korea	Kim Hyeon-uk; South Korea	Thomas Matthews; Great Britain
Men's individual	2	Fabien Lamirault; France	Rafał Czuper; Poland	Cha Soo-yong; South Korea
Men's individual	2	Fabien Lamirault; France	Rafał Czuper; Poland	Park Jin-cheol; South Korea
Men's individual	3	Feng Panfeng; China	Thomas Schmidberger; Germany	Jenson Van Emburgh; United States
Men's individual	3	Feng Panfeng; China	Thomas Schmidberger; Germany	Zhai Xiang; China
Men's individual	4	Abdullah Öztürk; Turkey	Kim Young-gun; South Korea	Maxime Thomas; France
Men's individual	4	Abdullah Öztürk; Turkey	Kim Young-gun; South Korea	Nesim Turan; Turkey
Men's individual	5	Valentin Baus; Germany	Cao Ningning; China	Ali Öztürk; Turkey
Men's individual	5	Valentin Baus; Germany	Cao Ningning; China	Jack Hunter Spivey; Great Britain
Men's individual	6	Ian Seidenfeld; United States	Peter Rosenmeier; Denmark	Paul Karabardak; Great Britain
Men's individual	6	Ian Seidenfeld; United States	Peter Rosenmeier; Denmark	Rungroj Thainiyom; Thailand
Men's individual	7	Yan Shuo; China	Will Bayley; Great Britain	Maksym Chudzicki; Poland
Men's individual	7	Yan Shuo; China	Will Bayley; Great Britain	Liao Keli; China
Men's individual	8	Zhao Shuai; China	Viktor Didukh; Ukraine	Peng Weinan; China
Men's individual	8	Zhao Shuai; China	Viktor Didukh; Ukraine	Maksym Nikolenko; Ukraine
Men's individual	9	Laurens Devos; Belgium	Ma Lin; Australia	Ivan Mai; Ukraine
Men's individual	9	Laurens Devos; Belgium	Ma Lin; Australia	Iurii Nozdrunov; RPC
Men's individual	10	Patryk Chojnowski; Poland	Matéo Bohéas; France	Filip Radović; Montenegro
Men's individual	10	Patryk Chojnowski; Poland	Matéo Bohéas; France	David Jacobs; Indonesia
Men's individual	11	Péter Pálos; Hungary	Samuel Von Einem; Australia	Lucas Créange; France
Men's individual	11	Péter Pálos; Hungary	Samuel Von Einem; Australia	Florian Van Acker; Belgium
Men's team	1–2	France; Fabien Lamirault; Stéphane Molliens	South Korea; Cha Soo-yong; Park Jin-cheol; Kim Hyeon-uk	Slovakia; Martin Ludrovský; Ján Riapoš
Men's team	1–2	France; Fabien Lamirault; Stéphane Molliens	South Korea; Cha Soo-yong; Park Jin-cheol; Kim Hyeon-uk	Poland; Rafał Czuper; Tomasz Jakimczuk
Men's team	3	China; Feng Panfeng; Zhai Xiang; Zhao Ping	Germany; Thomas Brüchle; Thomas Schmidberger	Czech Republic; Petr Svatoš; Jiří Suchánek
Men's team	3	China; Feng Panfeng; Zhai Xiang; Zhao Ping	Germany; Thomas Brüchle; Thomas Schmidberger	Thailand; Anurak Laowong; Yuttajak Glinbancheun; Thirayu Chueawong
Men's team	4–5	China; Cao Ningning; Guo Xingyuan; Zhang Yan	South Korea; Kim Jung-gil; Kim Young-gun; Baek Young-bok	Slovakia; Boris Trávníček; Peter Mihálik
Men's team	4–5	China; Cao Ningning; Guo Xingyuan; Zhang Yan	South Korea; Kim Jung-gil; Kim Young-gun; Baek Young-bok	France; Florian Merrien; Nicolas Savant-Aira; Maxime Thomas
Men's team	6–7	China; Yan Shuo; Liao Keli; Chen Chao	Great Britain; Will Bayley; Paul Karabardak	Germany; Thomas Rau; Björn Schnake
Men's team	6–7	China; Yan Shuo; Liao Keli; Chen Chao	Great Britain; Will Bayley; Paul Karabardak	Spain; Jordi Morales; Álvaro Valera
Men's team	8	China; Zhao Shuai; Peng Weinan; Ye Chaoqun	Ukraine; Viktor Didukh; Maksym Nikolenko	France; Thomas Bouvais; Clément Berthier
Men's team	8	China; Zhao Shuai; Peng Weinan; Ye Chaoqun	Ukraine; Viktor Didukh; Maksym Nikolenko	Great Britain; Ross Wilson; Aaron McKibbin; Billy Shilton
Men's team	9–10	China; Lian Hao; Zhao Yiqing	Australia; Ma Lin; Joel Coughlan; Nathan Pellissier	Ukraine; Ivan Mai; Lev Kats
Men's team	9–10	China; Lian Hao; Zhao Yiqing	Australia; Ma Lin; Joel Coughlan; Nathan Pellissier	Nigeria; Tajudeen Agunbiade; Alabi Olufemi; Victor Farinloye

=== Women ===
Event	Class	Gold	Silver	Bronze
Women's individual	1–2	Liu Jing; China	Seo Su-yeon; South Korea	Cátia Oliveira; Brazil
Women's individual	1–2	Liu Jing; China	Seo Su-yeon; South Korea	Nadezhda Pushpasheva; RPC
Women's individual	3	Xue Juan; China	Alena Kánová; Slovakia	Lee Mi-gyu; South Korea
Women's individual	3	Xue Juan; China	Alena Kánová; Slovakia	Yoon Ji-yu; South Korea
Women's individual	4	Zhou Ying; China	Bhavina Patel; India	Gu Xiaodan; China
Women's individual	4	Zhou Ying; China	Bhavina Patel; India	Zhang Miao; China
Women's individual	5	Zhang Bian; China	Pan Jiamin; China	Jung Young-a; South Korea
Women's individual	5	Zhang Bian; China	Pan Jiamin; China	Khetam Abuawad; Jordan
Women's individual	6	Maryna Lytovchenko; Ukraine	Maliak Alieva; RPC	Raisa Chebanika; RPC
Women's individual	6	Maryna Lytovchenko; Ukraine	Maliak Alieva; RPC	Stephanie Grebe; Germany
Women's individual	7	Kelly van Zon; Netherlands	Viktoriia Safonova; RPC	Anne Barnéoud; France
Women's individual	7	Kelly van Zon; Netherlands	Viktoriia Safonova; RPC	Kübra Korkut; Turkey
Women's individual	8	Mao Jingdian; China	Huang Wenjuan; China	Aida Dahlen; Norway
Women's individual	8	Mao Jingdian; China	Huang Wenjuan; China	Thu Kamkasomphou; France
Women's individual	9	Lei Lina; Australia	Xiong Guiyan; China	Karolina Pęk; Poland
Women's individual	9	Lei Lina; Australia	Xiong Guiyan; China	Alexa Szvitacs; Hungary
Women's individual	10	Yang Qian; Australia	Bruna Costa Alexandre; Brazil	Natalia Partyka; Poland
Women's individual	10	Yang Qian; Australia	Bruna Costa Alexandre; Brazil	Tien Shiau-wen; Chinese Taipei
Women's individual	11	Elena Prokofeva; RPC	Léa Ferney; France	Wong Ting Ting; Hong Kong
Women's individual	11	Elena Prokofeva; RPC	Léa Ferney; France	Maki Ito; Japan
Women's team	1–3	China; Xue Juan; Li Qian; Liu Jing	South Korea; Yoon Ji-yu; Lee Mi-gyu; Seo Su-yeon	Italy; Michela Brunelli; Giada Rossi
Women's team	1–3	China; Xue Juan; Li Qian; Liu Jing	South Korea; Yoon Ji-yu; Lee Mi-gyu; Seo Su-yeon	Croatia; Anđela Mužinić; Helena Dretar Karić
Women's team	4–5	China; Zhang Bian; Zhou Ying; Zhang Miao	Sweden; Anna-Carin Ahlquist; Ingela Lundbäck	Great Britain; Megan Shackleton; Sue Bailey
Women's team	4–5	China; Zhang Bian; Zhou Ying; Zhang Miao	Sweden; Anna-Carin Ahlquist; Ingela Lundbäck	Serbia; Borislava Perić; Nada Matić
Women's team	6–8	China; Mao Jingdian; Huang Wenjuan; Wang Rui	Netherlands; Frederique van Hoof; Kelly van Zon	France; Anne Barnéoud; Thu Kamkasomphou
Women's team	6–8	China; Mao Jingdian; Huang Wenjuan; Wang Rui	Netherlands; Frederique van Hoof; Kelly van Zon	RPC; Viktoriia Safonova; Maliak Alieva; Raisa Chebanika
Women's team	9–10	Poland; Natalia Partyka; Karolina Pęk	Australia; Yang Qian; Lei Lina; Melissa Tapper	Brazil; Bruna Costa Alexandre; Danielle Rauen; Jennyfer Marques Parinos
Women's team	9–10	Poland; Natalia Partyka; Karolina Pęk	Australia; Yang Qian; Lei Lina; Melissa Tapper	China; Zhao Xiaojing; Xiong Guiyan

== See also ==
- Table tennis at the 2020 Summer Olympics
