= Nigeria at the 2020 Summer Paralympics =

- Flag of Nigeria
- IPC code: NGR
- NPC: Nigeria Paralympic Committee

in Tokyo, Japan 24 August 2021 – 5 September 2021
- Competitors: 22 in 4 sports
- Medals: Gold 4 Silver 1 Bronze 5 Total 10

Summer Paralympics appearances (overview)
- 1992; 1996; 2000; 2004; 2008; 2012; 2016; 2020; 2024

Nigeria competed at the 2020 Summer Paralympics in Tokyo, Japan, from 24 August and 5 September 2021. This was their eighth consecutive appearance at the Summer Paralympics since 1992.

== Medalists ==
| Medal | Name | Sport | Event | Date |
|---|---|---|---|---|
| Gold | Latifat Tijani | Powerlifting | Women's 45 kg | 26 August |
| Gold | Bose Omolayo | Powerlifting | Women's 79 kg | 29 August |
| Gold | Folashade Oluwafemiayo | Powerlifting | Women's 86 kg | 30 August |
| Gold | Flora Ugwunwa | Athletics | Women's javelin throw F54 | 4 September |
| Silver | Loveline Obiji | Powerlifting | Women's +86 kg | 30 August |
| Bronze | Lucy Ejike | Powerlifting | Women's 61 kg | 28 August |
| Bronze | Olaitan Ibrahim | Powerlifting | Women's 67 kg | 28 August |
| Bronze | Tajudeen Agunbiade; Alabi Olufemi; Victor Farinloye | Table tennis | Men's team – Class 9–10 | 1 September |
| Bronze | Eucharia Iyiazi | Athletics | Women's shot put F57 | 2 September |
| Bronze | Lauritta Onye | Athletics | Women's shot put F40 | 4 September |

== Competitors ==
The following is the list of number of competitors participating in the Games:

| Sport | Men | Women | Total |
|---|---|---|---|
| Athletics | 1 | 4 | 5 |
| Powerlifting | 3 | 7 | 10 |
| Rowing | 1 | 0 | 1 |
| Table tennis | 5 | 1 | 6 |
| Total | 10 | 12 | 22 |

== Athletics ==
Flora Ugwunwa qualified to compete in the women's javelin throw F54 event. She qualified after winning the silver medal in the women's javelin throw F54 event at the 2019 World Para Athletics Championships held in Dubai, United Arab Emirates. Lauritta Onye qualified to compete in the women's shot put F40 event.

| Athlete | Event | Rank |
Men
| GALADIMA Suwaibidu | Men's 100m - T47 | |
Women
| Lauritta Onye | Women's shot put F40 | |
| Flora Ugwunwa | Women's javelin throw F54 | 1st place, gold medalist(s) |
| IYIAZI Eucharia | Women's Shot Put - F57 | |
| IYIAZI Eucharia | Women's Discus Throw - F57 | |
| NWAOZUZU Grace | Women's Discus Throw - F57 | |
| Flora Ugwunwa | Women's Shot Put - F54 | |

== Powerlifting ==
| Number | Athlete | Event | Result | Rank |
Men
| 1 | Yakubu Adesokan | Men's 49 kg | 155 | 4 |
| 2 | Ibrahim Dauda | Men's 59 kg | 170 | 5 |
| 3 | Nnamdi Innocent | Men's 72 kg | NM | - |
Women
| 4 | Latifat Tijani | Women's 45 kg | 107 | 1st place, gold medalist(s) |
| 5 | Lucy Ejike | Women's 61 kg | 130 | 3rd place, bronze medalist(s) |
| 6 | Olaitan Ibrahim | Women's 67 kg | 119 | 3rd place, bronze medalist(s) |
| 7 | Paulina Okpala | Women's 73 kg | 124 | 6 |
| 8 | Bose Omolayo | Women's 79 kg | 141 | 1st place, gold medalist(s) |
| 9 | Folashade Oluwafemiayo | Women's 86 kg | 151 | 1st place, gold medalist(s) |
| 10 | Loveline Obiji | Women's +86 kg | 147 | 2nd place, silver medalist(s) |

== Rowing ==
Nigeria qualified one boats in the men's single sculls events for the games by winning the gold medal at the 2019 FISA African Qualification Regatta in Tunis, Tunisia.

| Athlete | Event | Heats | | Repechage | | Final | |
| Athlete | Event | Time | Rank | Time | Rank | Time | Rank |
|---|---|---|---|---|---|---|---|
| Kingsley Okoroafor Ijomah | Men's single sculls | | | | | | |

Qualification Legend: FA=Final A (medal); FB=Final B (non-medal); R=Repechage

== Table tennis ==
Nigeria entered six athletes into the table tennis competition at the games. Five athletes qualified from 2019 ITTF African Para Championships which was held in Alexandria, Egypt and Isau Ogunkunle via World Ranking allocation.

Men

| Athlete | Event | Group Stage | | | | Round 1 | Quarterfinals | Semifinals | Final | |
| Athlete | Event | Opposition Result | Opposition Result | Opposition Result | Rank | Opposition Result | Opposition Result | Opposition Result | Opposition Result | Rank |
|---|---|---|---|---|---|---|---|---|---|---|
| Ahmed Owolabi Koleosho | Individual C3 | Brüchle (GER); L 0-3 | Petruniv (GER); W 3-1 | —N/a | 2 Q | Zhao Ping (CHN); L 1-3 | Did not advance | | | |
| Isau Ogunkunle | Individual C4 | Thomas (FRA); L 2-3 | Sameh Mohamed Saleh (EGY); L 1-3 | —N/a | 3 DQ | Did not advance | | | | |
| Victor Farinloye | Individual C8 | Didukh (UKR); L 2-3 | Shilton (GBR); L 0-3 | —N/a | 3 DQ | Did not advance | | | | |
| Tajudeen Agunbiade | Individual C9 | May (UKR); L 0-3 | Qing (CHN); W 3-2 | —N/a | 2 Q | Devos (BEL); L 0-3 | did not advance | | | |
| Alabi Olabiyi Olufemi | Individual C10 | Hao (CHN); L 0-3 | Coughlan (AUS); L 0-3 | Radovic (MNE); L 0-3 | 4 DQ | Did not advance | | | | |

Women

| Athlete | Event | Group Stage | | | | Round 1 | Quarterfinals | Semifinals | Final | |
| Athlete | Event | Opposition Result | Opposition Result | Opposition Result | Rank | Opposition Result | Opposition Result | Opposition Result | Opposition Result | Rank |
|---|---|---|---|---|---|---|---|---|---|---|
| Faith Obazuaye | Individual C10 | Tien (TPE); L 0-3 | Zhao (CHN); L 0-3 | Yang (AUS); L 0-3 | 4 DQ | Did not advance | | | | |

== See also ==
- Nigeria at the Paralympics
- Nigeria at the 2020 Summer Olympics
