= Table tennis at the 2020 Summer Paralympics – Women's individual – Class 10 =

Table tennis at the XVI Paralympic Games
- Venue: Tokyo Metropolitan Gymnasium
- Dates: 25–30 August 2021
- Competitors: 10 from 8 nations

Medalists
1st place, gold medalist(s)		Yang Qian	Australia
2nd place, silver medalist(s)		Bruna Alexandre	Brazil
3rd place, bronze medalist(s)		Natalia Partyka	Poland
3rd place, bronze medalist(s)		Tien Shiau-wen	Chinese Taipei

The Women's individual table tennis – Class 10 tournament at the 2020 Summer Paralympics in Tokyo took place between 25 and 30 August 2021 at Tokyo Metropolitan Gymnasium. Classes 6–10 were for athletes with a physical impairment in their upper body, and who compete in a standing position. The lower the number, the greater the impact the impairment was on an athlete's ability to compete.

In the preliminary stage, athletes competed in 3 groups of three or four. Winners and runners-up of each group qualified for the knock-out stage. In this edition of the Games, no bronze medal match was held. Losers of each semifinal were automatically awarded a bronze medal.

== Results ==
All times are local time in UTC+9.

=== Main bracket ===
==== Final rounds ====
Quarterfinals
B2	Melissa Tapper (AUS)	11	3	8
C2	Yang Qian (AUS)	13	11	11
C1	Tien Shiau-wen (TPE)	5	11	13	11
A2	Merve Demir (TUR)	11	5	11	8

Semifinals
A1	Natalia Partyka (POL) (bronze)	7	11	11	6	9
C2	Yang Qian (AUS)	11	4	9	11	11
C1	Tien Shiau-wen (TPE) (bronze)	14	6	10	7
B1	Bruna Alexandre (BRA)	12	11	12	11

Gold medal match
C2	Yang Qian (AUS) (gold)	13	6	11	11
B1	Bruna Costa Alexandre (BRA) (silver)	11	11	7	9

=== Preliminary round ===
Qualified for the knock-out stage

==== Group A ====
Seed	Athlete	Won	Lost	Points diff	Rank
1	Natalia Partyka (POL)	2	0	+32	1
6	Merve Demır (TUR)	1	1	–3	2
9	Nozomi Takeuchi (JPN)	0	2	–29	3

Nozomi Takeuchi (JPN)	6	4	3
Natalia Partyka (POL)	11	11	11

Merve Demır (TUR)	7	7	12	5
Natalia Partyka (POL)	11	11	10	11

Merve Demır (TUR)	11	11	11
Nozomi Takeuchi (JPN)	8	7	9

==== Group B ====
Seed	Athlete	Won	Lost	Points diff	Rank
4	Bruna Alexandre (BRA)	2	0	+28	1
2	Melissa Tapper (AUS)	1	1	–10	2
8	Lin Tzu-yu (TPE)	0	2	–18	3

Lin Tzu-yu (TPE)	11	8	6	9
Melissa Tapper (AUS)	9	11	11	11

Bruna Alexandre (BRA)	11	11	11
Melissa Tapper (AUS)	7	2	6

Bruna Alexandre (BRA)	11	11	11
Lin Tzu-yu (TPE)	8	8	7

==== Group C ====
Seed	Athlete	Won	Lost	Points diff	Rank
5	Tien Shiau-wen (TPE)	3	0	+36	1
3	Yang Qian (AUS)	2	1	+22	2
7	Zhao Xiaojing (CHN)	1	2	–9	3
10	Faith Obazuaye (NGR)	0	3	–49	4

Tien Shiau-wen (TPE)	11	11	11
Faith Obazuaye (NGR)	9	3	5

Zhao Xiaojing (CHN)	13	12	11	9	3
Yang Qian (AUS)	15	10	9	11	11

Tien Shiau-wen (TPE)	11	13	12
Yang Qian (AUS)	9	11	10

Faith Obazuaye (NGR)	6	5	9
Zhao Xiaojing (CHN)	11	11	11

Yang Qian (AUS)	11	11	11
Faith Obazuaye (NGR)	9	1	3

Tien Shiau-wen (TPE)	11	11	11
Zhao Xiaojing (CHN)	7	7	5
