= Table tennis at the 2024 Summer Paralympics – Women's doubles WD20 =

Women's doubles WD20 at the XVII Paralympic Games
- Venue: South Paris Arena 4, Paris
- Dates: 29 – 31 August 2024
- Competitors: 22 from 11 nations

Medalists
1st place, gold medalist(s)		Lei Lina; Yang Qian	Australia
2nd place, silver medalist(s)		Lin Tzu-Yu; Tien Shiau-Wen	Chinese Taipei
3rd place, bronze medalist(s)		Natalia Partyka; Karolina Pęk	Poland
3rd place, bronze medalist(s)		Bruna Alexandre; Danielle Rauen	Brazil

The women's doubles – Class 20 tournament at the 2024 Summer Paralympics in Paris will take place between 29 and 31 August 2024 at South Paris Arena 4.

== Schedule ==
The schedule are as below:

P	Preliminary round	¼	Quarter-finals	½	Semi-finals	G	Gold medal match

Events	Dates					
Events	Thu 29 Aug		Fri 30 Aug		Sat 31 Aug	
Events	M	E	M	E	M	E
Women's doubles WD20	P		¼		½	G

== Results ==
=== Gold medal match ===
Gold medal match
1	Lin T-y (TPE); Tian S-w (TPE)	7	6	11	10
2	Lei LN (AUS); Yang Q (AUS)	11	11	3	12

=== Top half ===
Round of 16
11	A Händén (SWE); S Sand (SWE)	5	9	4
5	M Demir (TUR); N Kavas (TUR)	11	11	11
6	Hou CX (CHN); Xiong GY (CHN)	11	11	11
10	S Kelmer (BRA); J M Parinos (BRA)	1	5	7

Quarter-finals
1	Lin T-y (TPE); Tien S-w (TPE)	11	11	11
5	M Demir (TUR); N Kavas (TUR)	7	6	8
6	Hou CX (CHN); Xiong GY (CHN)	11	11	11	2	9
3	N Partyka (POL); K Pęk (POL)	9	9	13	11	11

Semi-finals
1	Lin T-y (TPE); Tien S-w (TPE)	11	11	11
3	N Partyka (POL); K Pęk (POL)	7	6	4

=== Bottom half ===
Round of 16
7	Liu M (CHN); Mao JD (CHN)	11	10	11	8	11
9	Z Arlóy (HUN); A Szvitacs (HUN)	9	12	7	11	9

Quarter-finals
4	B Alexandre (BRA); D Rauen (BRA)	11	11	11
8	M Lytovchenko (UKR); I Shynkarova (UKR)	4	2	3
7	Liu M (CHN); Mao JD (CHN)	8	11	4
2	Lei LN (AUS); Yang Q (AUS)	11	13	11

Semi-finals
4	B Alexandre (BRA); D Rauen (BRA)	8	9	10
2	Lei LN (AUS); Yang Q (AUS)	11	11	12
