= 2020 Summer Paralympics medal table =

List of medals won by Paralympic delegations

2020 Summer Paralympics medals
- Location: Tokyo, Japan

Highlights
- Most gold medals: China (96)
- Most total medals: China (207)
- Medalling NPCs: 86

Visualisation of the number of gold medals won, in each discipline, by the top 10 ranked countries at the Tokyo Paralympics

The medal table of the 2020 Summer Paralympics ranks the participating National Paralympic Committees (NPCs) by the number of gold medals that are won by their athletes during the competition. The 2020 Paralympics were the sixteenth Games to be held, a quadrennial competition open to athletes with physical and intellectual disabilities. The games were held in Tokyo, Japan from 24 August to 5 September 2021. There were 539 medal events.

Athletes from Costa Rica, Ecuador, El Salvador, Montenegro, and Oman won their first Paralympic medals. El Salvador and Oman had never won an Olympic medal. Costa Rica, Ecuador, Ethiopia, Pakistan, and Sri Lanka won their first Paralympic gold medals.

== Medal table ==
Judo, table tennis and taekwondo award two bronze medals per discipline - the table tennis to losing semi-finalists, a first since the 1996 Summer Paralympics and the two combat sports by a repechage system whereby defeated athletes up to the semi-final stage rejoin competition for a bronze medal.

Two silver medals were awarded for a second-place tie in the men's high jump T47 athletics event. No bronze medal was awarded as a result.

Two bronze medals were awarded for a third-place tie in the men's 100 metres T64 athletics event.

Two bronze medals were awarded for a third-place tie in the women's 100 metre freestyle S7 swimming event.

Due to the disqualification of two participants, a bronze medal was not awarded in the women's 100 metres T11 athletics event.

Key

* Host nation (Japan)

2020 Summer Paralympics medal table
Rank	NPC	Gold	Silver	Bronze	Total
1	China	96	60	51	207
2	Great Britain	41	38	45	124
3	United States	37	36	31	104
4	RPC	36	33	49	118
5	Netherlands	25	17	17	59
6	Ukraine	24	47	27	98
7	Brazil	22	20	30	72
8	Australia	21	29	30	80
9	Italy	14	29	26	69
10	Azerbaijan	14	1	4	19
11	Japan*	13	15	23	51
12	Germany	13	12	18	43
13	Iran	12	11	1	24
14	France	11	15	29	55
15	Spain	9	15	12	36
16	Uzbekistan	8	5	6	19
17	Poland	7	6	11	24
18	Hungary	7	5	4	16
19	Switzerland	7	4	3	14
20	Mexico	7	2	13	22
21	New Zealand	6	3	3	12
22	Israel	6	2	1	9
23	Canada	5	10	6	21
24	India	5	8	6	19
25	Thailand	5	5	8	18
26	Slovakia	5	2	4	11
27	Belarus	5	1	1	7
28	Tunisia	4	5	2	11
29	Algeria	4	4	4	12
30	Morocco	4	4	3	11
31	Belgium	4	3	8	15
32	Ireland	4	2	1	7
33	Nigeria	4	1	5	10
34	South Africa	4	1	2	7
35	Cuba	4	1	1	6
36	Jordan	4	0	1	5
37	Colombia	3	7	14	24
38	Venezuela	3	2	2	7
39	Malaysia	3	2	0	5
40	Denmark	3	1	1	5
41	South Korea	2	10	12	24
42	Turkey	2	4	9	15
43	Indonesia	2	3	4	9
44	Czech Republic	2	3	3	8
45	Chile	2	3	1	6
45	Serbia	2	3	1	6
47	Norway	2	0	2	4
48	Singapore	2	0	0	2
49	Austria	1	5	3	9
50	Sweden	1	5	2	8
51	Greece	1	3	7	11
52	Finland	1	3	1	5
52	Kazakhstan	1	3	1	5
54	United Arab Emirates	1	1	1	3
55	Costa Rica	1	1	0	2
56	Ecuador	1	0	2	3
57	Cyprus	1	0	1	2
57	Sri Lanka	1	0	1	2
59	Ethiopia	1	0	0	1
59	Mongolia	1	0	0	1
59	Pakistan	1	0	0	1
59	Peru	1	0	0	1
63	Argentina	0	5	4	9
64	Egypt	0	5	2	7
65	Croatia	0	3	4	7
66	Latvia	0	3	2	5
67	Georgia	0	3	0	3
68	Hong Kong	0	2	3	5
69	Bulgaria	0	2	0	2
70	Iraq	0	1	2	3
71	Kuwait	0	1	1	2
71	Namibia	0	1	1	2
71	Romania	0	1	1	2
71	Slovenia	0	1	1	2
75	Vietnam	0	1	0	1
76	Lithuania	0	0	3	3
77	Portugal	0	0	2	2
78	Bosnia and Herzegovina	0	0	1	1
78	Chinese Taipei	0	0	1	1
78	El Salvador	0	0	1	1
78	Kenya	0	0	1	1
78	Montenegro	0	0	1	1
78	Oman	0	0	1	1
78	Qatar	0	0	1	1
78	Saudi Arabia	0	0	1	1
78	Uganda	0	0	1	1
Totals (86 entries)		539	540	589	1,668

=== Podium sweeps ===
Date	Sport	Event	Team	Gold	Silver	Bronze	Ref
27 August	Swimming	Men's 50 metre butterfly S5	China	Zheng Tao	Wang Lichao	Yuan Weiyi	
28 August	Swimming	Women's 100m backstroke S11	China	Cai Liwen	Wang Xinyi	Li Guizhi	
30 August	Swimming	Men's 50m backstroke S5	China	Zheng Tao	Ruan Jingsong	Wang Lichao	
1 September	Swimming	Men's 50m freestyle S5	China	Zheng Tao	Yuan Weiyi	Wang Lichao	
4 September	Athletics	Women's 100 metres T63	Italy	Ambra Sabatini	Martina Caironi	Monica Contrafatto	

== Changes ==
Marcin Polak was provisionally suspended from the men's individual pursuit B pending an adjudication following a positive test for a banned substance.

== See also ==
- All-time Paralympic Games medal table
- 2020 Summer Olympics medal table
