= Powerlifting at the 2020 Summer Paralympics – Women's 61 kg =

Powerlifting – Women's 61 kg at the XVI Paralympic Games
- Venue: Tokyo International Forum
- Date: 28 August 2021
- Competitors: 9 from 9 nations

Medalists
1st place, gold medalist(s)		Amalia Pérez	Mexico
2nd place, silver medalist(s)		Ruza Kuzieva	Uzbekistan
3rd place, bronze medalist(s)		Lucy Ejike	Nigeria

The women's 61 kg powerlifting event at the 2020 Summer Paralympics was contested on 28 August at Tokyo International Forum.

== Records ==
There are twenty powerlifting events, corresponding to ten weight classes each for men and women. Prior to this competition, the existing world and Paralympic records were as follows.

World Record	Lucy Ejike (NGR)	142.0 kg	Rio de Janeiro, Brazil	11 September 2016
Paralympic Record	Lucy Ejike (NGR)	142.0 kg	Rio de Janeiro, Brazil	11 September 2016

== Results ==
Rank	Name	Body weight (kg)	Attempts (kg)				Result (kg)
Rank	Name	Body weight (kg)	1	2	3	4	Result (kg)
1st place, gold medalist(s)	Amalia Pérez (MEX)	58.86	125	126	131	–	131
2nd place, silver medalist(s)	Ruza Kuzieva (UZB)	58.35	~~126~~	~~126~~	130	–	130
3rd place, bronze medalist(s)	Lucy Ejike (NGR)	60.24	130	~~135~~	~~135~~	–	130
4	Fatma Korany (EGY)	59.42	116	119	127	–	127
5	Rayisa Toporkova (UKR)	59.05	110	~~116~~	~~119~~	–	110
6	Fatema Alhasan (SYR)	60.57	92	~~96~~	97	–	97
7	Lin Ya-hsuan (TPE)	60.05	73	78	~~81~~	–	78
	Somkhoun Anon (THA)	57.28	~~85~~	~~87~~	~~90~~	–	NM
	Yasemin Ceylan Baydar (TUR)	60.84	~~112~~	~~112~~	~~120~~	–	NM
