= Ruza Kuzieva =

Uzbekistani Paralympic powerlifter (born 1994)

Personal information
- Born: 12 March 1994 (age 32)

Sport
- Country: Uzbekistan
- Sport: Paralympic powerlifting
Medal record
Paralympic Games
Silver medal – second place	2020 Tokyo	61 kg
Silver medal – second place	2024 Paris	73 kg
World Championships
Silver medal – second place	2019 Nur-Sultan	61 kg
Bronze medal – third place	2017 Mexico City	55 kg
Asian Para Games
Gold medal – first place	2018 Jakarta	55 kg

Ruza Kuzieva (born 12 March 1994) is an Uzbekistani Paralympic powerlifter. She won the silver medal in the women's 61 kg event at the 2020 Summer Paralympics held in Tokyo, Japan. She won the gold medal in the women's 55 kg event at the 2018 Asian Para Games and she is a two-time medalist at the World Para Powerlifting Championships.

== Career ==
In 2013, Kuzieva was banned for two years after testing positive for metandienone, a banned substance. A few years later, in 2016, she tested positive for meldonium but she was not banned at that time.

Kuzieva won the bronze medal in the women's 55 kg event at the 2017 World Para Powerlifting Championships held in Mexico City, Mexico. At the 2019 World Para Powerlifting Championships held in Nur-Sultan, Kazakhstan, she won the silver medal in the women's 61 kg event.

== Results ==
Year	Venue	Weight	Attempts (kg)			Total	Rank
Year	Venue	Weight	1	2	3	Total	Rank
Summer Paralympics
2021	Tokyo, Japan	61 kg	~~126~~	~~126~~	130	130	2nd place, silver medalist(s)
