= Powerlifting at the 2020 Summer Paralympics – Women's 45 kg =

Powerlifting – Women's 45 kg at the XVI Paralympic Games
- Venue: Tokyo International Forum
- Date: 26 August 2021
- Competitors: 9 from 9 nations

Medalists
1st place, gold medalist(s)		Latifat Tijani	Nigeria
2nd place, silver medalist(s)		Cui Zhe	China
3rd place, bronze medalist(s)		Justyna Kozdryk	Poland

The women's 45 kg powerlifting event at the 2020 Summer Paralympics was contested on 26 August at Tokyo International Forum.

== Records ==
There are twenty powerlifting events, corresponding to ten weight classes each for men and women. Prior to this competition, the existing world and Paralympic records were as follows.

World Record	Guo Lingling (CHN)	118.0 kg	Nur-Sultan, Kazakhstan	13 July 2019
Paralympic Record	Hu Dandan (CHN)	108.0 kg	Rio de Janeiro, Brazil	9 September 2016

== Results ==
Rank	Name	Body weight (kg)	Attempts (kg)				Result (kg)
Rank	Name	Body weight (kg)	1	2	3	4	Result (kg)
1st place, gold medalist(s)	Latifat Tijani (NGR)	43.19	~~105~~	105	107	~~117~~	107
2nd place, silver medalist(s)	Cui Zhe (CHN)	41.29	95	100	102	–	102
3rd place, bronze medalist(s)	Justyna Kozdryk (POL)	43.22	93	95	101	–	101
4	Samira Guerioua (ALG)	41.75	~~82~~	82	90	–	90
5	Alina Solodukhina (KAZ)	43.29	~~80~~	80	83	–	83
6	Nur'Aini Binte Mohamad Yasli (SGP)	44.08	~~77~~	77	~~82~~	–	77
7	Oriana del Carmen Teran Velazquez (VEN)	43.63	73	~~75~~	~~75~~	–	73
-	Mimozette Nghamsi Fotie (CMR)	44.49	~~90~~	~~90~~	~~90~~	-	NMR
	Nazmiye Muratli (TUR)	43.63	~~90~~	–	–	–	DNF
