= Table tennis at the 2020 Summer Olympics – Qualification =

This article details the qualifying phase for table tennis at the 2020 Summer Olympics (postponed to 2021 due to the COVID-19 pandemic). The competition at these Games will comprise a total of 172 table tennis players coming from their respective NOCs; each may enter up to six athletes, two male and two female athletes in singles events, up to one men's and one women's team in team events, and up to one pair in mixed doubles.

As the host nation, Japan automatically qualified six athletes, a team of three men and women with one each competing in the singles as well as a mixed doubles team.

For the team events, 16 teams qualify. Each continent (with the Americas being divided into North America and South America for ITTF competition) had a qualifying competition to qualify one team. Nine teams qualify through a world qualifying event. Japan, as the host, is guaranteed a team spot.

The mixed doubles will also have 16 pairs qualify. Each continent (with the Americas being divided into North America and South America for ITTF competition) had a qualifying competition to qualify one pair. Four teams qualify through the World Tour Grand Finals 2019 and five through the World Tour 2020. Japan is also guaranteed a place. If an NOC has both a mixed doubles pair and a team in one or both genders qualify, the doubles player must be a member of the team in their gender.

For individual events, between 64 and 70 individual players qualify. Each NOC with a qualified team may enter 2 members of that team in the individual competition. 22 quota places will be awarded through continental championships to individuals who belong to an NOC without a qualified team. There will be one Tripartite Commission invitation place. The remainder of the total 172 quota places will be filled through a final world singles qualifying tournament (no less than two and no more than eight qualifiers) and then the ITTF world ranking.

== Qualification summary ==
NOC	Men		Women		Mixed	Total
NOC	Singles	Team	Singles	Team	Doubles	Total
Algeria	1					1
Argentina	2					2
Australia	2	X	2	X	X	6
Austria	2		2	X	X	6
Brazil	2	X	2	X		6
Bulgaria			1			1
Cameroon			1			1
Canada	1		1		X	3
Chile			1			1
China	2	X	2	X	X	6
Croatia	2	X				3
Cuba			1		X	2
Czech Republic	2		1			3
Denmark	1					1
Ecuador	1					1
Egypt	2	X	2	X	X	6
France	2	X	2	X	X	6
Fiji			1			1
Germany	2	X	2	X	X	6
Great Britain	2		1			3
Greece	1					1
Guyana			1			1
Hong Kong	2	X	2	X	X	6
Hungary	1		2	X	X	5
India	2		2		X	4
Iran	1					1
Italy			1			1
Japan	2	X	2	X	X	6
Kazakhstan	1		1			2
Luxembourg			2			2
Monaco			1			1
Mongolia	1		1			2
Netherlands			1			1
Nigeria	2		2			4
Poland			2	X		3
Portugal	2	X	2			5
Puerto Rico	1		2			3
Romania	1		2	X	X	4
ROC	1		2			3
Saudi Arabia	1					1
Senegal	1					1
Serbia	2	X				3
Singapore	1		2	X		4
Slovakia	1		1		X	3
Slovenia	2	X				3
South Korea	2	X	2	X	X	6
Spain	1		2			3
Sweden	2	X	2			5
Switzerland			1			1
Syria			1			1
Chinese Taipei	2	X	2	X	X	6
Thailand			2			2
Togo	1					1
Tunisia	1		1			2
Ukraine	1		2			3
United States	2	X	2	X		6
Vanuatu	1					1
Total: 57 NOCs	65	16	70	16	16	172

== Events ==
=== Men's team ===
Event	Date	Venue	Places	Qualified team
2019 European Games	June 22–29, 2019	(Belarus) Minsk	1	Germany
2019 African Games	August 20–30, 2019	(Morocco) Rabat	1	Egypt
2019 ATTU Asian Championships	September 15–22, 2019	(Indonesia) Yogyakarta	1	China
North America Qualification Event	October 5, 2019	(United States) Rockford	1	United States
Latin America Qualification Event	October 25–27, 2019	(Peru) Lima	1	Brazil
Oceania Qualification Event	December 6–8, 2019	(Australia) Mornington	1	Australia
World Qualification Event	January 22–26, 2020	(Portugal) Gondomar	9	Croatia; France; Hong Kong; Portugal; Serbia; Slovenia; South Korea; Sweden; Chinese Taipei
Host NOC	February 15, 2020	—	1	Japan
Total			16	

=== Women's team ===
Event	Date	Venue	Places	Qualified team
2019 European Games	June 22–29, 2019	(Belarus) Minsk	1	Germany
2019 African Games	August 20–30, 2019	(Morocco) Rabat	1	Egypt
2019 ATTU Asian Championships	September 15–22, 2019	(Indonesia) Yogyakarta	1	China
North America Qualification Event	October 5, 2019	(United States) Rockford	1	United States
Latin America Qualification Event	October 25–27, 2019	(Peru) Lima	1	Brazil
Oceania Qualification Event	December 6–8, 2019	(Australia) Mornington	1	Australia
World Qualification Event	January 22–26, 2020	(Portugal) Gondomar	9	Austria; Hong Kong; Hungary; ~~North Korea~~; Poland; Romania; Singapore; South Korea; Chinese Taipei
Reallocation	June 9, 2021	—	1	France
Host NOC	February 15, 2020	—	1	Japan
Total			16	

=== Mixed doubles ===
Event	Date	Venue	Places	Qualified team
2019 European Games	June 22–29, 2019	(Belarus) Minsk	1	Germany
2019 ITTF World Tour Grand Finals	December 12–15, 2019	(China) Zhengzhou	4	China; Japan; Hong Kong; Chinese Taipei
Africa Qualification Event	February 27–29, 2020	(Tunisia) Tunis	1	Egypt
North America Qualification Event	March 7–8, 2020	(Canada) Kitchener	1	Canada
Asia Qualification Event	March 18–20, 2021	(Qatar) Doha	1	India
Latin America Qualification Event	April 13–17, 2021	(Argentina) Rosario	1	Cuba
Oceania Allocation	May 1, 2021	—	1	Australia
ITTF World Ranking	May 1, 2021	—	6	South Korea; Slovakia; Austria; France; Romania; Hungary
Total			16	

=== Men's singles ===
Event	Date	Venue	Places	Qualified athlete
Qualified teams (2 individuals per team)			32	Australia; Brazil; China; Croatia; Egypt; France; Germany; Hong Kong; Japan; Portugal; Serbia; Slovenia; South Korea; Sweden; Chinese Taipei; United States
2019 European Games	June 22–29, 2019	(Belarus) Minsk	1	Jonathan Groth (DEN)
West Asia Qualification Event	February 23–26, 2020	(Jordan) Amman	1	Ali Al-Khadrawi (KSA)
Africa Qualification Event	February 27–29, 2020	(Tunisia) Tunis	4	Ibrahima Diaw (SEN); Adem Hmam (TUN); Olajide Omotayo (NGR); Larbi Bouriah (ALG)
North America Qualification Event	March 7–8, 2020	(Canada) Kitchener	1	Jeremy Hazin (CAN)
World Singles Qualification Tournament	March 14–17, 2021	(Qatar) Doha	4	Lubomír Jančařík (CZE); Bence Majoros (HUN); Wang Yang (SVK); Kirill Skachkov (ROC)
Asia Qualification Event	March 18–20, 2021	(Qatar) Doha	5	Nima Alamian (IRI)^{CA} Enkhbatyn Lkhagvasüren (MGL)^{EA} Sathiyan Gnanasekaran (IND)^{SA} Clarence Chew (SGP)^{SEA} Sharath Kamal (IND)
Latin America Qualification Event	April 13–17, 2021	(Argentina) Rosario	4	Brian Afanador (PUR); Horacio Cifuentes (ARG); Alberto Miño (ECU); Gastón Alto (ARG)
Europe Qualification Event	April 21–25, 2021	(Portugal) Odivelas	5	Kou Lei (UKR); Álvaro Robles (ESP); Panagiotis Gionis (GRE); Ovidiu Ionescu (ROU); Pavel Širuček (CZE)
Oceania Allocation	May 1, 2021	—	1	Yoshua Shing (VAN)
ITTF World Ranking	June 1, 2021	—	6	Liam Pitchford (GBR); Quadri Aruna (NGR); Robert Gardos (AUT); ~~Vladimir Samsonov (BLR)~~; Daniel Habesohn (AUT); Kirill Gerassimenko (KAZ); Paul Drinkhall (GBR)
Tripartite Commission	June 1, 2021	—	1	Dodji Fanny (TOG)
Total			65	

=== Women's singles ===
Event	Date	Venue	Places	Qualified athlete
Qualified teams (2 individuals per team)			32	Australia; Austria; Brazil; China; Egypt; France; Germany; Hong Kong; Hungary; Japan; ~~North Korea~~; Poland; Romania; Singapore; South Korea; Chinese Taipei; United States
2019 European Games	June 22–29, 2019	(Belarus) Minsk	2	Fu Yu (POR); Ni Xialian (LUX)
2019 Pan American Games	August 4–10, 2019	(Peru) Lima	1	Adriana Díaz (PUR)
West Asia Qualification Event	February 23–26, 2020	(Jordan) Amman	1	Hend Zaza (SYR)
Africa Qualification Event	February 27–29, 2020	(Tunisia) Tunis	4	Offiong Edem (NGR); Fadwa Garci (TUN); Olufunke Oshonaike (NGR); Sarah Hanffou (CMR)
North America Qualification Event	March 7–8, 2020	(Canada) Kitchener	1	Zhang Mo (CAN)
World Singles Qualification Tournament	March 14–17, 2021	(Qatar) Doha	5	Britt Eerland (NED); Linda Bergström (SWE); Polina Mikhailova (ROC); Yang Xiaoxin (MON); Suthasini Sawettabut (THA)
Asia Qualification Event	March 18–20, 2021	(Qatar) Doha	5	Anastassiya Lavrova (KAZ)^{CA} Batmönkhiin Bolor-Erdene (MGL)^{EA} Sutirtha Mukherjee (IND)^{SA} Orawan Paranang (THA)^{SEA} Manika Batra (IND)
Latin America Qualification Event	April 13–17, 2021	(Argentina) Rosario	3	María Paulina Vega (CHI); Melanie Díaz (PUR); Daniela Fonseca (CUB)
Europe Qualification Event	April 21–25, 2021	(Portugal) Odivelas	4	Yana Noskova (ROC); Maria Xiao (ESP); Polina Trifonova (BUL); Christina Källberg (SWE)
Oceania Allocation	May 1, 2021	—	1	Sally Yee (FIJ)
ITTF World Ranking	June 1, 2021	—	10	Margaryta Pesotska (UKR); Hana Matelová (CZE); Barbora Balážová (SVK); Shao Jieni (POR); Hanna Haponova (UKR); Debora Vivarelli (ITA); Sarah de Nutte (LUX); Galia Dvorak (ESP); Rachel Moret (SUI); Tin-Tin Ho (GBR)
Tripartite Commission	June 1, 2021	—	1	Chelsea Edghill (GUY)
Total			70	

== See also ==
- Table tennis at the 2020 Summer Paralympics – Qualification
