= Lev Kats =

Ukrainian para table tennis player

Personal information
- Born: 25 February 2001 (age 25) Zaporizhzhia, Ukraine

Sport
- Sport: Table tennis
Medal record
Men's para table tennis
Representing Ukraine
Paralympic Games
Bronze medal – third place	2020 Tokyo	Team C9–10

Lev Olehovych Kats (Ukrainian: Лев Олегович Кац; born 25 February 2001) is a Ukrainian para table tennis player. He won one of the bronze medals in the men's team C9–10 event men's individual C9 event at the 2020 Summer Paralympics held in Tokyo, Japan alongside Ivan Mai. He also competed in the men's individual C9 event.
