= Kinga Dróżdż =

Polish wheelchair fencer

Personal information
- Born: 6 September 1994 (age 31) Będzin, Poland

Sport
- Country: Poland
- Sport: Wheelchair fencing
- Disability class: B
Medal record
Paralympic Games
Silver medal – second place	2024 Paris	Sabre A

Kinga Dróżdż (born 6 September 1994) is a Polish Paralympic wheelchair fencer who competes in both épée and sabre B.

At the Wheelchair Fencing World Cup held in Eger, Hungary in 2020, she won the gold medal in the sabre event. As a result, the Polish Paralympic Committee awarded her the Paralympic Athlete of the Year.

She won the silver in the women's sabre A event at the 2024 Summer Paralympics held in Paris, France.
