= Krzysztof Żyłka =

Polish para table tennis player

Personal information
- Born: 10 December 1979 (age 46) Sanok, Poland
- Height: 1.85 m (6 ft 1 in)

Sport
- Country: Poland
- Sport: Para table tennis
- Disability: Spinal cord injury
- Disability class: C4
- Club: IKS Jezioro Tarnobrzeg
Medal record
Para table tennis
Representing Poland
World Championships
Silver medal – second place	2014 Beijing	Teams C4
European Championships
Silver medal – second place	2019 Helsingborg	Teams C4
Bronze medal – third place	2013 Lignano	Teams C4
Bronze medal – third place	2015 Vejle	Teams C4
Bronze medal – third place	2017 Lasko	Teams C4
Bronze medal – third place	2019 Helsingborg	Singles C4

Krzysztof Żyłka (born 10 December 1979) is a Polish para table tennis player who competes in international table tennis competitions. He is a World silver medalist and a four-time European bronze medalist, he has also competed in the 2016 and 2020 Summer Paralympics but did not medal in either Games.
