= Lucas Créange =

French Paralympic table tennis player

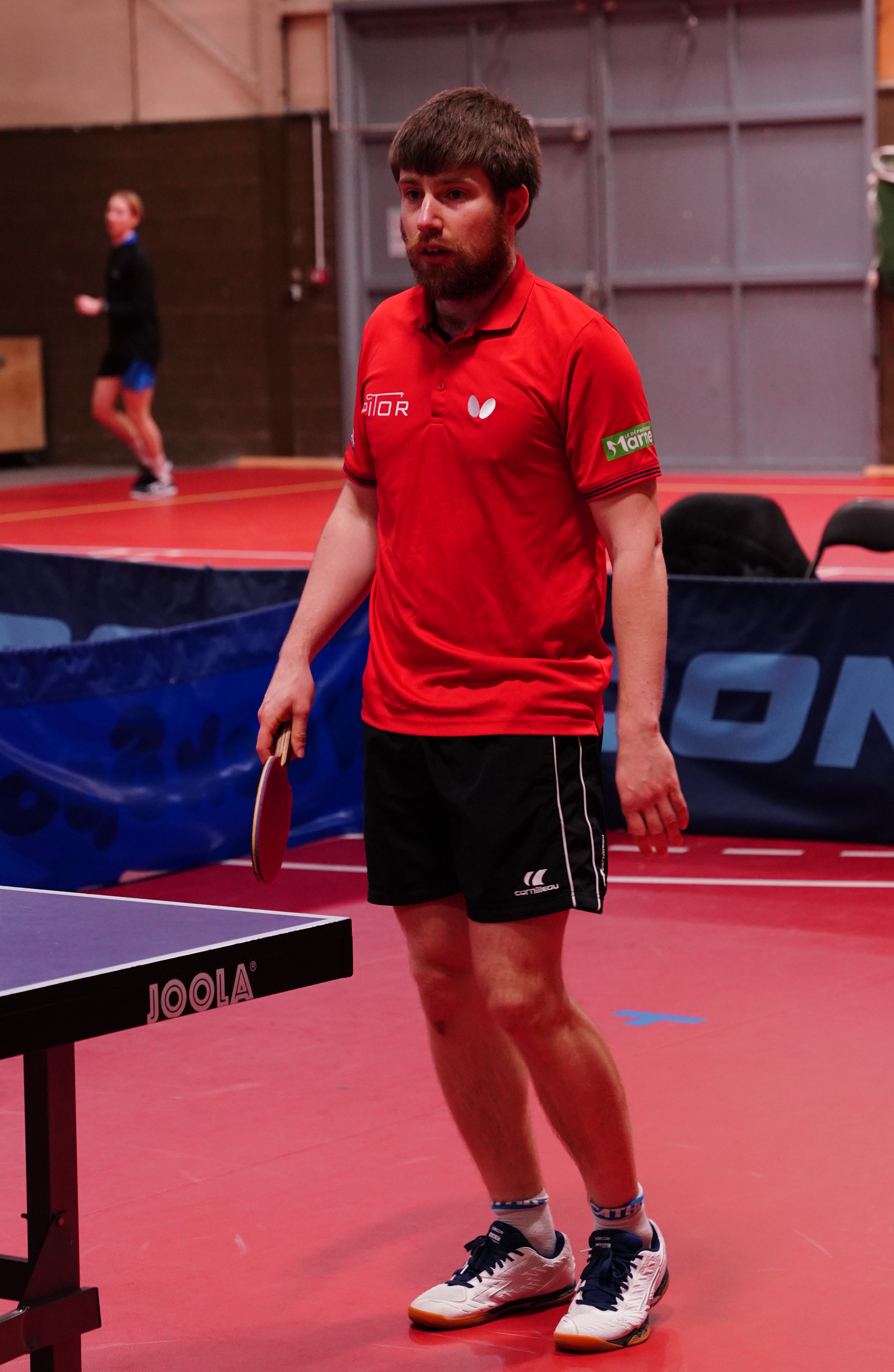
- Créange in 2024

Personal information
- Full name: Lucas Edouard Créange
- Born: 26 October 1992 (age 33) Troyes, France
- Height: 1.80 m (5 ft 11 in)

Sport
- Country: France
- Sport: Para table tennis
- Disability class: C11
Medal record
Para table tennis
Representing France
Paralympic Games
Bronze medal – third place	2020 Tokyo	Singles C11
World Team Championships
Gold medal – first place	2017 Bratislava	Teams C11
World Championships
Bronze medal – third place	2018 Lasko	Singles C11
European Championships
Gold medal – first place	2019 Helsingborg	Teams C11
Silver medal – second place	2015 Vejle	Singles C11
Silver medal – second place	2017 Lasko	Singles C11
Bronze medal – third place	2019 Helsingborg	Singles C11
INAS Global Games
Bronze medal – third place	2019 Brisbane	Singles C11
Bronze medal – third place	2019 Brisbane	Teams C11

Lucas Edouard Créange (born 26 October 1992 in Troyes) is a French Paralympic table tennis player. At the 2020 Summer Paralympics, he won a bronze medal in the Men's individual class 11 event. He has also competed at the INAS Global Games where he won two bronze medals, and is a World and European champion in team events.
