= Lin Tzu-yu =

Taiwanese para table tennis player

Personal information
- Born: 23 June 2000 (age 26)

Sport
- Country: Chinese Taipei
- Sport: Para table tennis
- Disability class: D20
Medal record
Women's table tennis
Representing Chinese Taipei
Paralympic Games
Silver medal – second place	2024 Paris	Doubles WD20
Asian Para Games
Gold medal – first place	2022 Hangzhou	Singles C10
Gold medal – first place	2022 Hangzhou	Doubles XD17
Silver medal – second place	2018 Jakarta	Teams C8-10
Silver medal – second place	2022 Hangzhou	Doubles WD20

Lin Tzu-yu (born 23 June 2000) is a Taiwanese para table tennis player. She represented Chinese Taipei at the 2024 Summer Paralympics in the women's doubles WD20 event, where she reached the finals with Tien Shiau-wen. She previously won three medals (two gold, one silver) at the 2023 Asian Para Games.
