= Megan Shackleton =

British Paralympic tennis player (born 1999)

Personal information
- Born: 21 March 1999 (age 27) Halifax, West Yorkshire, England

Sport
- Country: Great Britain
- Sport: Para table tennis
- Disability: Spinal cord injury
Medal record
Para table tennis
Representing Great Britain
Paralympic Games
Bronze medal – third place	2020 Tokyo	Teams C4-5
World Team Championships
Bronze medal – third place	2017 Bratislava	Teams C4-5
European Championships
Bronze medal – third place	2015 Vejle	Teams C4-5
Bronze medal – third place	2019 Helsingborg	Teams C4-5

Megan Shackleton (born 21 March 1999) is a British Paralympic table tennis player. She won bronze in the Women's Team – Class 4–5 at the 2020 Summer Paralympics in Tokyo with Sue Bailey. She is also a World bronze medallist and a double European bronze medallist.

Shackleton was once a competitive swimmer and focused on participating in the Olympics. However, she had a spinal fracture in a machinery-related accident at the age of nine, which left her reliant on a wheelchair. In 2011, aged 12, she began playing para table tennis after visiting an open public sporting event in Leeds and trying out the sport. Two years later, she joined the GB para table tennis team.
