= Maksym Chudzicki =

Polish para table tennis player

Personal information
- Full name: Maksym Hubert Chudzicki
- Born: 24 May 1999 (age 27) Kraków, Poland

Sport
- Country: Poland
- Sport: Para table tennis
- Disability class: C7
Medal record
Para table tennis
Representing Poland
Paralympic Games
Bronze medal – third place	2020 Tokyo	Singles C7
European Championships
Bronze medal – third place	2019 Helsingborg	Teams C7

Maksym Hubert Chudzicki (born 24 May 1999) is a Polish para table tennis player who won bronze in men's singles class 7 at the 2020 Paralympic Games.
