= Ivan Mai =

Ukrainian para table tennis player

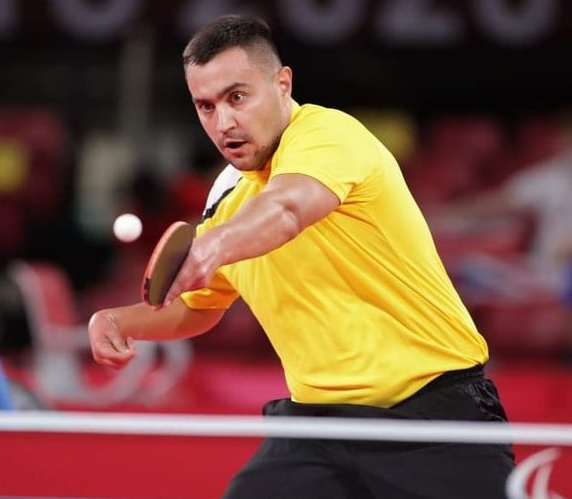

Personal information
- Born: 8 November 1995 (age 30) Poltava, Ukraine

Sport
- Sport: Table tennis
Medal record
Men's para table tennis
Representing Ukraine
Paralympic Games
Bronze medal – third place	2020 Tokyo	Singles C9
Bronze medal – third place	2020 Tokyo	Team C9–10

Ivan Mai (Ukrainian: Іван Геннадійович Май; born 8 November 1995) is a Ukrainian para table tennis player. He won one of the bronze medals in the men's individual C9 event at the 2020 Summer Paralympics held in Tokyo, Japan. He also won one of the bronze medals in the men's team C9–10 event.

== Sports achievements ==
- Silver medalist of the 2017 World Championships
- European champion of 2017
- Silver medalist of the European Championship 2017
- Bronze medalist of the 2018 World Cup
- European champion 2019
- Champion of the international tournament 2021
- Two-time bronze medalist at the 2020 Summer Paralympic Games
