= Yan Shuo =

Chinese para table tennis player

Personal information
- Born: July 26, 1995 (age 31) Pizhou, Jiangsu, China
- Height: 186 cm (6 ft 1 in)
- Weight: 61 kg (134 lb)

Sport
- Sport: Table tennis
- Playing style: Left-handed shakehand grip
- Disability class: 7
- Highest ranking: 1 (September 2018)
- Current ranking: 2 (February 2020)
Medal record
Men's para table tennis
Representing China
Paralympic Games
Gold medal – first place	2020 Tokyo	Singles C7
Gold medal – first place	2020 Tokyo	Teams C6-7
Gold medal – first place	2024 Paris	Singles C7
Gold medal – first place	2024 Paris	Doubles MD14
Bronze medal – third place	2016 Rio de Janeiro	Singles C7
World Championships
Bronze medal – third place	2018 Laško	Singles C7
Asian Para Games
Gold medal – first place	2010 Guangzhou	Teams C9–10
Gold medal – first place	2014 Incheon	Teams C6–7
Gold medal – first place	2018 Jakarta	Singles C7
Gold medal – first place	2018 Jakarta	Teams C6–7
Silver medal – second place	2014 Incheon	Singles C7
Bronze medal – third place	2022 Hangzhou	Singles C7
Asian Championships
Gold medal – first place	2015 Amman	Singles C7
Gold medal – first place	2015 Amman	Teams C6–7
Gold medal – first place	2017 Beijing	Singles C7
Gold medal – first place	2017 Beijing	Teams C6–7
Gold medal – first place	2019 Taichung	Singles C7
Silver medal – second place	2019 Taichung	Teams C6–7

Yan Shuo
- Traditional Chinese: 閆碩
- Simplified Chinese: 闫硕
Transcriptions
Standard Mandarin
- Hanyu Pinyin: Yán Shuò

Yan Shuo (Chinese: 闫硕, born 26 July 1995) is a Chinese para table tennis player.

== Career ==
He won a bronze medal at the 2016 Summer Paralympics in the men's C7 event. In the delayed Tokyo 2020 Summer Paralympics he improved on his previous bronze by winning gold in the same event, defeating the defending champion Will Bayley as well as taking gold in the team event for the same category, against the same opponent and his partner.

== Personal life ==
He lost most of his right leg when he was six years old, following a car accident. Like many of his teammates, Yan attended New Hope Center and trained under coach Heng Xin.
