= Jennyfer Marques Parinos =

Brazilian para table tennis player

Personal information
- Born: 22 February 1996 (age 30) Santos, São Paulo, Brazil
- Height: 1.53 m (5 ft 0 in)
- Weight: 58 kg (128 lb)

Sport
- Country: Brazil
- Sport: Para table tennis
- Disability: X-linked hypophosphatemia
- Disability class: C9
- Coached by: Paulo Camargo
Medal record
Para table tennis
Representing Brazil
Paralympic Games
Bronze medal – third place	2016 Rio de Janeiro	Teams C6-10
World Championships
Gold medal – first place	2017 Bratislava	Teams C9-10
Bronze medal – third place	2014 Beijing	Teams C9-10
Parapan American Games
Silver medal – second place	2015 Toronto	Singles C9-10
Silver medal – second place	2019 Lima	Singles C8-10
Pan American Championships
Gold medal – first place	2013 San Jose	Singles C8-10
Gold medal – first place	2017 San Jose	Singles C7-9

Jennyfer Marques Parinos (born 22 February 1996) is a Brazilian para table tennis player who competes in international elite competitions. She is a Paralympic bronze medalist, double Parapan American Games silver medalist and a World champion. She has won numerous team event medals with Danielle Rauen and Bruna Costa Alexandre.

Marques Parinos was diagnosed at a young age with a rare disease called X-linked hypophosphatemia (XLH) when she found walking unaided painful.
