= Joel Coughlan =

Australian para table tennis player

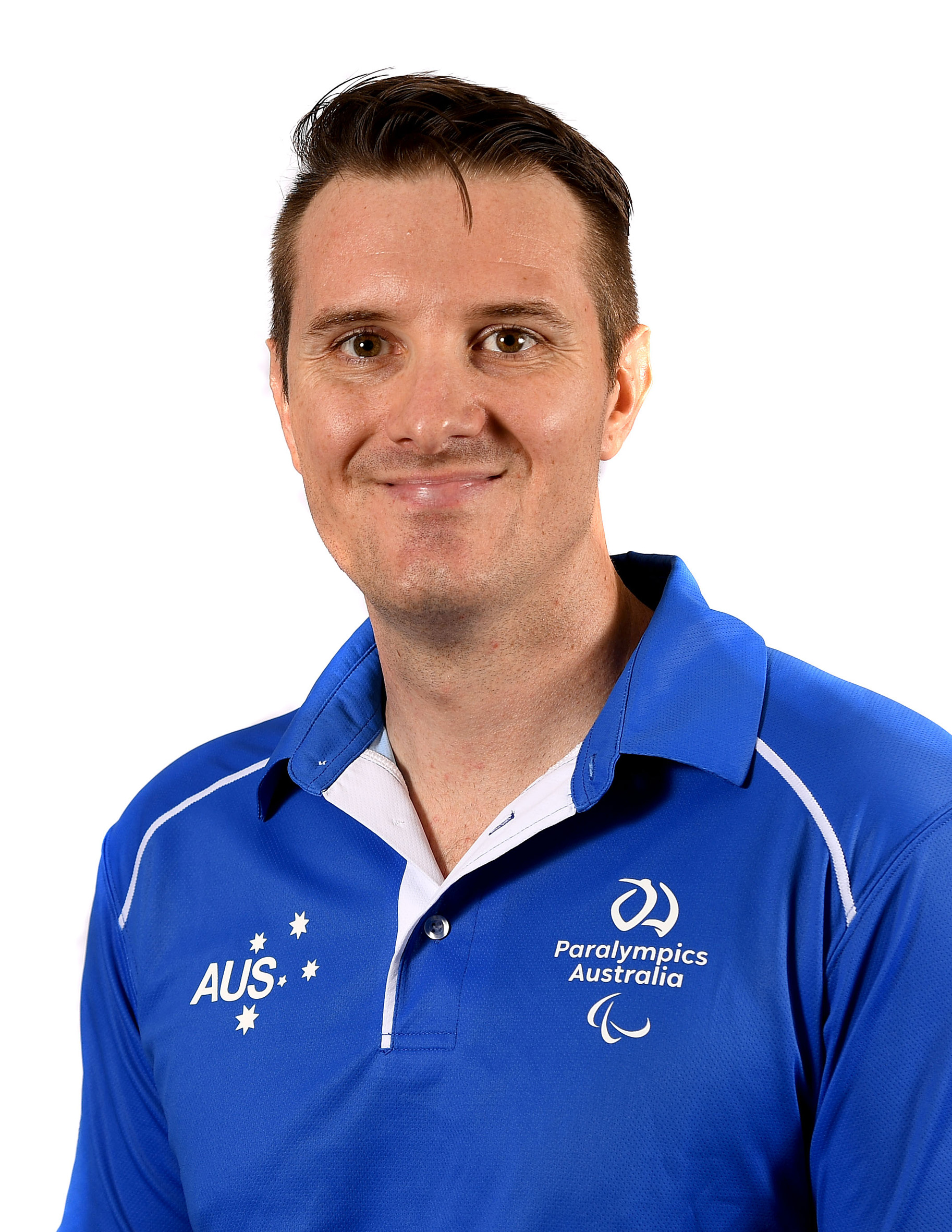
- Joel Coughlan in 2019

Personal information
- Nationality: Australian
- Born: 13 July 1988 (age 38)

Sport
- Country: Australia
- Sport: Table Tennis
Medal record
Men's para table tennis
Representing Australia
Paralympic Games
| Silver medal – second place | 2020 Tokyo | Team C9–10 |

Joel Coughlan (born 13 July 1988) is an Australian Paralympic table tennis player.

He represented Australia at the 2020 Tokyo Paralympics. He and his teammates Ma Lin and Nathan Pellissier won silver after Australia was defeated by China in the Men's team - class 9-10 gold medal final.

== Personal ==
Coughlan was born on 13 July 1988. In 2007, he had a workplace accident in industrial workshop in Rockhampton. Half a tonne of mining equipment fell from a forklift and resulted in him having 3½ toes on his right foot amputated. This led to "19 operations, endless physiotherapy treatment, skin grafting, renal dialysis and a tendon transfer, not to mention suffered a lot of pain". In 2021, he lives in Norman Gardens, Rockhampton and works as a Sales and Service Manager.

== Table tennis ==
Coughlan is classified as C10 table tennis player. Prior to his accident, he was a professional table tennis player. He made his international debut at the 2009 International Table Tennis Federation (ITTF) Para-table Tennis Asia and Oceania Championships in Amman, Jordan. At the 2011 ITTF Para-table Tennis Asia and Oceania Championships in Hong Kong, he defeated the world No. 3 in the men's singles Class 10. He narrowly missed selection to the Australian Paralympic Team for the Rio 2016 Paralympic Games.

At the 2019 Oceania Para Table Tennis Championships, Darwin, he won the gold medal in the Men's Singles Class 6-10 and gold medal with Nathan Pellissier in the Class 6-10 Teams.

=== 2020 Summer Paralympics ===
Coughlan was selected to represent Australia in the 2020 Summer Paralympics, held in Tokyo in 2021.

In the opening match of the Men's individual - class 10 event, Coughlan competed against Filip Radovic from Montenegro where he was defeated in a four-game match, three of which were decided by narrow margins. However, he secured a maiden win in the second match against Alabi Olabiyi Olufemi from Nigeria which allowed him to play unsuccessfully against Lian Hao for a spot in the quarter-finals.

In the Men's team - class 9-10 event, Australia won silver after Coughlan and teammate Ma Lin were defeated 2-0 by China's duo of Lian Hao and Yi Qing Zhao in the gold medal final.

After his efforts in Tokyo, Coughlan was recognised as the Rockhampton Region's Sportsperson of the Year at the local Australia Day Awards held at Kershaw Gardens in Rockhampton on 26 January 2022.
