= Danielle Rauen =

Brazilian para table tennis player

Personal information
- Nickname: Dani
- Born: 18 December 1997 (age 28) São Bento do Sul, Brazil
- Home town: Piracicaba, Brazil
- Height: 172 cm (5 ft 8 in)
- Weight: 70 kg (154 lb)

Sport
- Country: Brazil
- Sport: Para table tennis
- Disability: Juvenile rheumatoid arthritis, Atrophy
- Disability class: C9
- Coached by: Paulo Camargo
Medal record
Para table tennis
Representing Brazil
Paralympic Games
Bronze medal – third place	2016 Rio de Janeiro	Women's teams C6-10
Bronze medal – third place	2020 Tokyo	Women's teams C9-10
Bronze medal – third place	2024 Paris	Women's doubles WD20
World Team Championships
Gold medal – first place	2017 Bratislava	Women's teams C9-10
Parapan American Games
Gold medal – first place	2015 Toronto	Women's singles C9-10
Gold medal – first place	2015 Lima	Women's singles C8-10
Pan American Championships
Silver medal – second place	2013 San Jose	Women's singles C8-10

Danielle Rauen (born 18 December 1997) is a Brazilian para table tennis player. She competed at the 2016 Summer Paralympics, winning a bronze medal, and 2020 Summer Paralympics, in Women's team class 9–10, winning a bronze medal.

== Life ==
When she was five years old, she was diagnosed with juvenile rheumatoid arthritis which affected her joints in her hands, hips, knees and shoulder, she began table tennis in 2009 and started to play internationally in 2013.

Rauen has won international team titles with Bruna Costa Alexandre.
