= Billy Shilton =

British Paralympic table tennis player

Personal information
- Born: 9 October 1998 (age 27) Gloucester, England, Great Britain

Sport
- Country: Great Britain
- Sport: Para table tennis
- Disability: Charcot-Marie-Tooth disease
- Disability class: C8
Medal record
Para table tennis
Representing Great Britain
Paralympic Games
Bronze medal – third place	2020 Tokyo	Teams C8
Bronze medal – third place	2024 Paris	Doubles MD14
European Championships
Silver medal – second place	2015 Vejle	Teams C7
Silver medal – second place	2019 Helsingborg	Teams C8
Bronze medal – third place	2015 Vejle	Singles C7
Bronze medal – third place	2017 Lasko	Teams C8

Billy Shilton (born 9 October 1998) is a British Paralympic table tennis player. He won bronze in the Men's team – Class 8 at the 2020 Summer Paralympics in Tokyo.
