= Nathan Pellissier =

Australian para table tennis player

Personal information
- Nationality: Australian
- Born: 17 March 1996 (age 30) Williamstown, Victoria, Australia

Sport
- Country: Australia
- Sport: Table Tennis
Medal record
Paralympic Games
Silver medal – second place	2020 Tokyo	Team C9–10
World Championships
Bronze medal – third place	2022 Andalucia	Mixed Doubles 17

Nathan Pellissier (born 17 March 1996) is an Australian Paralympic table tennis player. He competed at the 2020 Tokyo Paralympics where he won a silver medal and at the 2024 Paris Paralympics.

== Personal ==
Pellissier was born on 17 March 1996 with cerebral palsy. In a four-year period late last decade, he had two hip surgeries and bone grafts. He attended the Maribyrnong Sports Academy. He completed his Bachelor of Business degree at RMIT and is working part-time at Coolahbah Law Chambers. In 2020, he has commenced Master of Professional Accounting and Finance at Deakin University. He lives in Williamstown, Victoria. In 2021, Pellissier was named as Deakin University's Sportsperson of the Year – Disability.

== Table tennis ==
Pellissier is classified as C8 table tennis player. He competed at the 2014 World Para Table Tennis Championships in China. In 2017, he finally defeated his C8 rival Barak Mizrachi at the Australian Para Table Tennis Nationals.

In 2017, he won gold medals at three major international championships, including the Korean Para Open and the Taiwan Para Open. The following year he lived and trained in Munich, Germany, picking up bronze medals at the Spanish Para Open and US Para Open, before gaining valuable experience at the World Championships in Slovenia.

At the 2019 Oceania Para Table Tennis Championships, Darwin, he won the silver medal in the Men’s Singles Class 6-10 and gold medal with Joel Coughlan in the Class 6-10 Teams.

At the 2020 Tokyo Paralympics, he lost both matches in the Men's Individual C8 and won a silver medal with Ma Lin and Joel Coughlan in the Men's Team C9-10. Pellissier competed at the 2024 Paris Paralympics in the Men's Singles 8, Men's Doubles 18 and Mixed Doubles 17 but did not progress after the opening matches.
