= Bruna Alexandre =

Brazilian para table tennis player

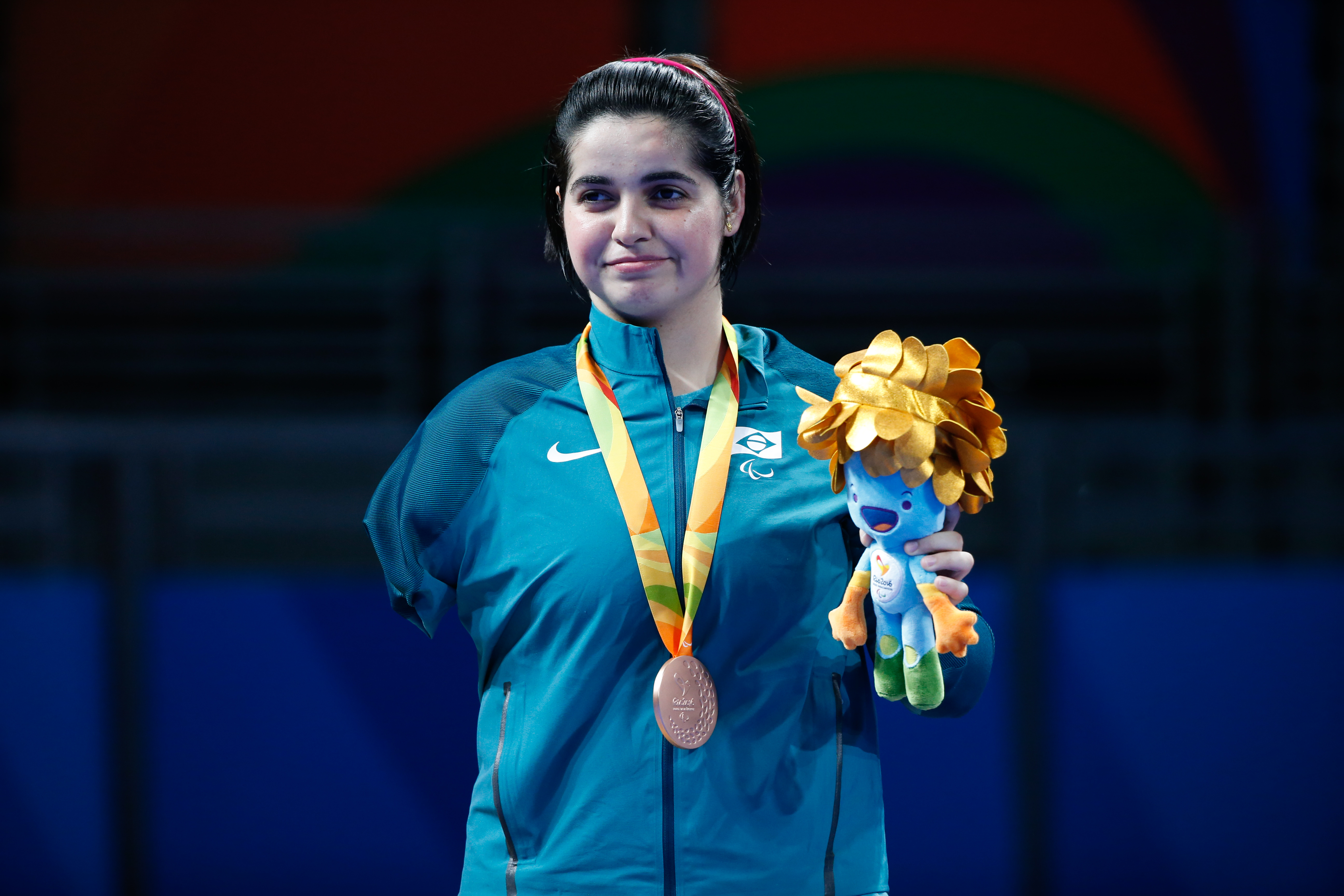
- Alexandre at the 2016 Summer Paralympics

Personal information
- Full name: Bruna Costa Alexandre
- Nickname: Bruninha
- Born: 29 March 1995 (age 31) Criciúma, Brazil
- Home town: Sao Caetano do Sul, Brazil
- Height: 160 cm (5 ft 3 in)
- Weight: 70 kg (154 lb)

Sport
- Country: Brazil
- Sport: Para table tennis
- Disability class: C10
- Club: São Caetano
Medal record
Women's table tennis
Representing Brazil
Paralympic Games
Silver medal – second place	2020 Tokyo	Women's singles C10
Bronze medal – third place	2016 Rio de Janeiro	Women's singles C10
Bronze medal – third place	2016 Rio de Janeiro	Women's team C6–10
Bronze medal – third place	2020 Tokyo	Women's team C9–10
Bronze medal – third place	2024 Paris	Singles C10
Bronze medal – third place	2024 Paris	Doubles WD20
World Championships
Gold medal – first place	2017 Bratislava	Women's team C9-10
Bronze medal – third place	2014 Beijing	Women's singles C10
Bronze medal – third place	2014 Beijing	Women's team C9-10
Pan American Games
Bronze medal – third place	2023 Santiago	Team
Pan American Championships
Gold medal – first place	2017 Cartagena de Indias	Team
Silver medal – second place	2019 Asunción	Team

Bruna Costa Alexandre (born 29 March 1995) is a Brazilian para table tennis player who is two-time World bronze medalist and Paralympic bronze medalist in both singles and teams events along with Danielle Rauen.

== Life ==
Alexandre had her right arm amputated due to thrombosis from a poorly applied vaccine injection when she was six months old.

In June 2021 she was one of the women selected to compose Brazil's Paralympic Table Tennis team for the 2020 Paralympic Games, which were delayed for a year due to the Coronavirus pandemic. The other athletes chosen to be part of the team were Cátia Oliveira (class 2), Dani Rauen (in class 9) and Joyce Oliveira (in class 4).

She went on to compete in the 2024 Summer Olympics, becoming the first Brazilian athlete to contest both the Paralympic and Olympic Games.

== See also ==
- List of athletes who have competed in the Paralympics and Olympics
