= Zhao Xiaojing =

Chinese para table tennis player

Personal information
- Born: 1 February 1995 (age 31)

Sport
- Sport: Para table tennis
Medal record
Representing China
Paralympic Games
Bronze medal – third place	2020 Tokyo	Teams C9-10
Asian Para Games
Gold medal – first place	2022 Hangzhou	Doubles C20
Bronze medal – third place	2018 Jakarta	Singles C10
Asian Championships
Gold medal – first place	2017 Beijing	Singles C10
Gold medal – first place	2017 Beijing	Teams C9-10
Gold medal – first place	2019 Taichung	Singles C10
Silver medal – second place	2019 Taichung	Teams C10
Bronze medal – third place	2025 Beijing	Singles C10
Bronze medal – third place	2025 Beijing	Doubles C20

Zhao Xiaojing (born 1 February 1995) is a Chinese para table tennis player who competes in international table tennis competitions. She is a Paralympic bronze medalist, Asian Para Games champion and three-time Asian champion in both singles and teams events.
