= Merve Demir =

Turkish para table tennis player

Personal information
- Full name: Merve Cansu Demir
- Born: 6 September 2001 (age 24) Ankara, Turkey
- Height: 170 cm (5 ft 7 in)
- Weight: 57 kg (126 lb)

Sport
- Country: Turkey
- Sport: Para table tennis
- Disability class: C10
- Coached by: Yusuf Kılınçkaya
Medal record
Para table tennis
Representing Turkey
World Team Championships
Silver medal – second place	2017 Bratislava	Teams C9-10
World Championships
Bronze medal – third place	2022 Andalucia	Singles C10
Bronze medal – third place	2022 Andalucia	Doubles C20
European Championships
Gold medal – first place	2013 Lignano	Teams C9-10
Gold medal – first place	2017 Lasko	Teams C9-10
Gold medal – first place	2019 Helsingborg	Teams C9-10
Silver medal – second place	2015 Vejle	Teams C9-10
Silver medal – second place	2019 Helsingborg	Singles C10
Bronze medal – third place	2015 Vejle	Singles C10
Bronze medal – third place	2017 Lasko	Singles C10

Merve Cansu Demir (born 6 September 2001) is a Turkish para table tennis player who competes at international table tennis competitions. She is a three-time European champion and double World bronze medalist. She competed at the 2020 Summer Paralympics where she competed in the singles and was defeated in the quarterfinals by Shiau Wen Tien in straight sets.
