= Yang Qian (table tennis) =

Chinese para table tennis player

Yang Qian OAM
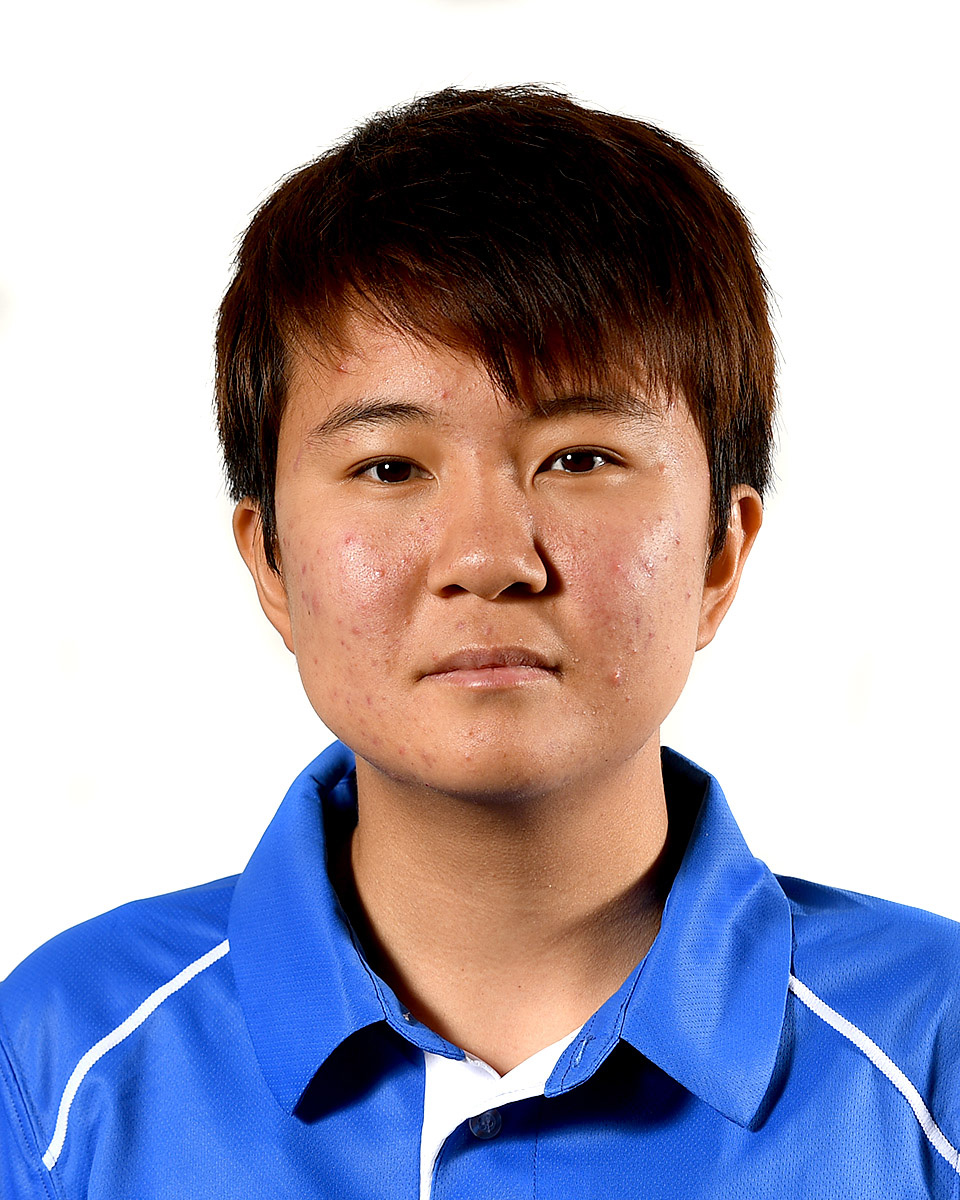

Personal information
- Born: 17 June 1996 (age 30) Qingjian County, Shaanxi, China
- Height: 163 cm (5 ft 4 in)
- Weight: 50 kg (110 lb)

Sport
- Sport: Table tennis
- Playing style: Right-handed shakehand grip
- Disability class: 10
- Highest ranking: 1 (October 2013)
- Current ranking: 3 (February 2020)
Medal record
Women's para table tennis
Representing Australia
Paralympic Games
Gold medal – first place	2020 Tokyo	Singles C10
Gold medal – first place	2024 Paris	Singles C10
Gold medal – first place	2024 Paris	Doubles WD20
Silver medal – second place	2020 Tokyo	Team Class 9-10
Commonwealth Games
Gold medal – first place	2022 Birmingham	Singles C6-10
Representing China
Paralympic Games
Gold medal – first place	2012 London	Teams C6–10
Silver medal – second place	2012 London	Singles C10
Silver medal – second place	2016 Rio de Janeiro	Singles C10
Silver medal – second place	2016 Rio de Janeiro	Teams C6–10
World Championships
Gold medal – first place	2014 Beijing	Teams C9–10
Gold medal – first place	2022 Andalucia	Singles C10
Gold medal – first place	2022 Andalucia	Women's Doubles 20
Silver medal – second place	2014 Beijing	Singles C10
Silver medal – second place	2022 Andalucia	Mixed Doubles 20
Asian Para Games
Gold medal – first place	2010 Guangzhou	Singles C10
Gold medal – first place	2010 Guangzhou	Teams C6–10
Gold medal – first place	2014 Incheon	Singles C9–10
Gold medal – first place	2014 Incheon	Teams C9–10
Asian Championships
Gold medal – first place	2009 Amman	Singles C10
Gold medal – first place	2009 Amman	Teams C6–10
Gold medal – first place	2011 Hong Kong	Teams C6–10
Gold medal – first place	2013 Beijing	Singles C10
Gold medal – first place	2015 Amman	Singles C9–10
Gold medal – first place	2015 Amman	Teams C6–10
Bronze medal – third place	2009 Amman	Open singles standing
Bronze medal – third place	2011 Hong Kong	Singles C10

Yang Qian
- Traditional Chinese: 楊倩
- Simplified Chinese: 杨倩
Transcriptions
Standard Mandarin
- Hanyu Pinyin: Yáng Qiàn

Yang Qian OAM (Chinese: 杨倩; Chinese: 楊倩; pinyin: Yáng Qiàn, born 17 June 1996) is a Chinese-Australian table tennis player who has only a right arm. Yang has won eight medals - four gold and four silver at Paralympic Games. In representing Australia, at the 2020 Tokyo Paralympics, she won a gold and silver medal and at the 2024 Paris Paralympics two gold medals.

== Table tennis ==
Yang's left arm was amputated following an accident when she was eight years old. She first played the sport when she was five years old. Yang moved to Melbourne, Australia in 2017 or later. She also registered with Table Tennis Australia, and competed in the Australian Open during the 2019 ITTF World Tour (with able-bodied athletes), losing her only singles match 1–4 to France's Audrey Zarif.

In 2020, Yang represented Australia at the 2020 Tokyo Paralympics where she won the gold medal in the Women's Singles C10 and the silver medal in the Women's Team C9-10 .

At the 2022 Commonwealth Games, she won the gold medal in the Women's singles C6–10.

At the 2024 Paris Paralympics, she won two gold medals - Women's Singles 10 and Women's Doubles 20 with Lei Lina.

== Recognition ==
- 2022 - Member of the Australian Table Table Tennis Team (Class 9–10) that was awarded 2020 Paralympics Australia Team of the Year.
- 2022 – Medal of the Order of Australia for service to sport as a gold medallist at the Tokyo Paralympic Games 2020
- 2024 - Victorian Institute of Sport Para Athlete of The Year with Emily Petricola
