= Tien Shiau-wen =

Taiwanese para table tennis player

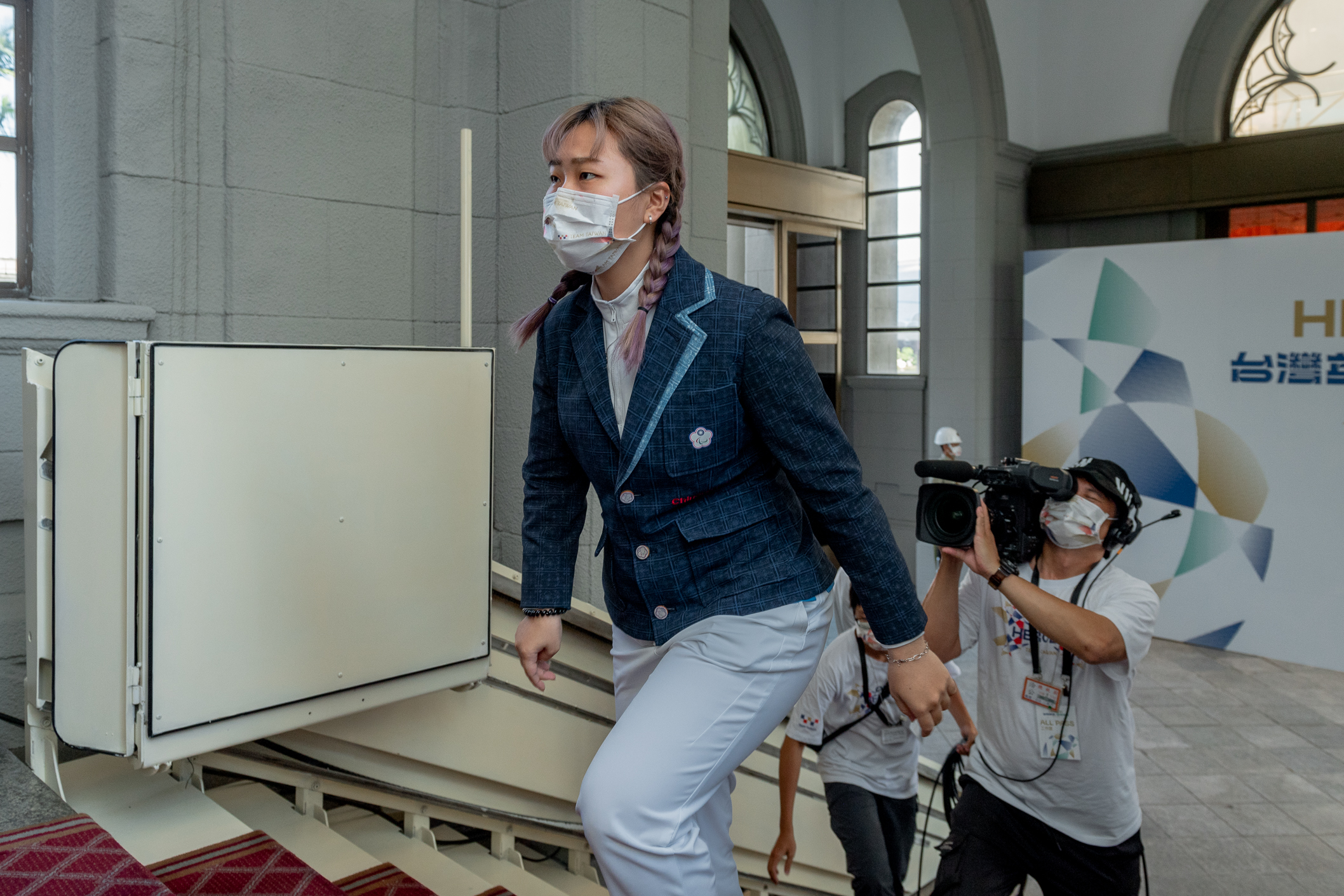
- Tien Shiau-wen

Personal information
- Born: 14 December 1999 (age 26) Kaohsiung, Taiwan

Sport
- Country: Chinese Taipei
- Sport: Para table tennis
- Disability class: 10
Medal record
Women's table tennis
Representing Chinese Taipei
Paralympic Games
Silver medal – second place	2024 Paris	Doubles WD20
Bronze medal – third place	2020 Tokyo	Singles C10
Bronze medal – third place	2024 Paris	Singles C10
World Championships
Bronze medal – third place	2018 Lasko	Singles C10
Bronze medal – third place	2022 Granada	Doubles WD20
Asian Para Games
Silver medal – second place	2018 Jakarta	Singles C10
Silver medal – second place	2018 Jakarta	Teams C8-10
Silver medal – second place	2022 Hangzhou	Singles C10
Silver medal – second place	2022 Hangzhou	Doubles C20

Tien Shiau-wen (Chinese: 田曉雯; born 14 December 1999) is a Taiwanese table tennis player.

== Personal life ==
Tien was born in Kaohsiung on 14 December 1999, and was raised on Liuqiu Island. The nerves in her right hand were damaged at birth, and she was bullied by classmates who noticed that she had limited use of that hand. Tien began playing table tennis at the age of nine.

== Career ==
She won two silver medals at the 2018 Asian Para Games, in the individual table tennis competition for class 10, and the women's class 8–10 team event alongside Lin Tzu-yu. At the 2020 Summer Paralympics, Tien medaled in the Class 10 individual women's table tennis, winning bronze.
