= Table tennis at the 2012 Summer Paralympics – Men's team – Class 6–8 =

Table tennis Men's team C6-8 at the XIV Paralympic Games
- Venue: ExCeL Exhibition Centre
- Dates: 5–7 September 2012

Medalists
1st place, gold medalist(s)		Piotr Grudzień; Marcin Skrzynecki	Poland
2nd place, silver medalist(s)		Álvaro Valera; Jordi Morales	Spain
3rd place, bronze medalist(s)		Ross Wilson; Will Bayley; Aaron McKibbin	Great Britain

The men's team class 6-8 table tennis event was part of the table tennis programme at the 2012 Summer Paralympics in London. The event took place from Wednesday 5 September to Friday 7 September.

== Bracket ==
The draw for team events took place on 28 August 2012.

First Round
1
16
Spain (ESP)	3
South Korea (KOR)	0
Germany (GER)	3
Slovakia (SVK)	1
Czech Republic (CZE)	2
Sweden (SWE)	3
Ukraine (UKR)	0
Poland (POL)	3
Belgium (BEL)	3
France (FRA)	2
Thailand (THA)	2
Italy (ITA)	3
15
2

Quarterfinals
China (CHN)	1
Spain (ESP)	3
Germany (GER)	3
Sweden (SWE)	1
Poland (POL)	3
Belgium (BEL)	2
Italy (ITA)	0
Great Britain (GBR)	3

Semifinals
Spain (ESP)	3
Germany (GER)	0
Poland (POL)	3
Great Britain (GBR)	2

Gold Medal Match
Spain (ESP)	0
Poland (POL)	3
Bronze Medal Match
Germany (GER)	0
Great Britain (GBR)	3

== Results ==
=== First round ===
5 September 2012; 09:00	Spain	3–0	South Korea

Report	Individual matches
Alvaro Valera	3–1	Park Hong Kyu	11–9, 3–11, 11–5, 11–5
Jordi Morales	3–0	Kim Young-sung	11–9, 11–7, 11–5
Jordi Morales	3–1	Park Hong Kyu	11–2, 10–12, 11–7, 11–5

5 September 2012; 09:00	Germany	3–1	Slovakia

Report	Individual matches
Thorsten Schwinn	2–3	Richard Csejtey	11–7, 11–5, 9–11, 8–11, 9–11
Jochen Wollmert	3–2	Miroslav Jambor	11–9, 8–11, 11–5, 4–11, 11–7
Jochen Wollmert	3–1	Richard Csejtey	9–11, 11–9, 11–6, 11–8
Thorsten Schwinn	3–0	Miroslav Jambor	11–7, 11–7, 11–8

5 September 2012; 09:00	Czech Republic	2–3	Sweden

Report	Individual matches
Zbynek Lambert	0–3	Emil Andersson	1–11, 4–11, 3–11
Daniel Horut	3–1	Fabian Rignell	11–9, 8–11, 11–9, 11–1
Daniel Horut	3–2	Emil Andersson	11–8, 6–11, 11–6, 8–11, 11–5
Zbynek Lambert	0–3	Fabian Rignell	9–11, 4–11, 4–11
Zbynek Lambert / Daniel Horut	1–3	Emil Andersson / Fabian Rignell	5–11, 4–11, 11–5, 13–15

5 September 2012; 09:00	Ukraine	0–3	Poland

Report	Individual matches
Maxym Nikolenko	2–3	Piotr Grudzien	7–11, 8–11, 12–10, 14–12, 12–14
Mykhaylo Popov	0–3	Marcin Skrzynecki	5–11, 8–11, 8–11
Mykhaylo Popov	2–3	Piotr Grudzien	11–5, 7–11, 4–11, 12–10, 9–11

5 September 2012; 09:00	Belgium	3–2	France

Report	Individual matches
Mathieu Loicq	3–1	Kevin Dourbecker	14–12, 11–8, 10–12, 11–7
Marc Ledoux	1–3	Stephane Messi	1–11, 11–7, 8–11, 10–12
Mathieu Loicq	2–3	Stephane Messi	9–11, 9–11, 11–4, 11–5, 13–15
Marc Ledoux	3–2	Kevin Dourbecker	13–11, 8–11, 11–2, 4–11, 11–6
Mathieu Loicq / Ben Despineux	3–1	Kevin Dourbecker / Stephane Messi	6–11, 11–4, 12–10, 11–8

5 September 2012; 09:00	Thailand	2–3	Italy

Report	Individual matches
Rungroj Thainiyom	3–2	Raimondo Alecci	5–11, 11–7, 11–6, 7–11, 11–8
Yuttana Namsaga	0–3	Davide Scazzieri	9–11, 9–11, 11–13
Rungroj Thainiyom	3–0	Davide Scazzieri	11–7, 11–6, 11–5
Yuttana Namsaga	2–3	Raimondo Alecci	12–10, 9–11, 10–12, 11–6, 7–11
Rungroj Thainiyom / Yuttana Namsaga	0–3	Raimondo Alecci / Davide Scazzieri	9–11, 8–11, 7–11

=== Quarter-finals ===
6 September 2012; 09:00	China	1–3	Spain

Report	Individual matches
Sun Churen	1–3	Álvaro Valera	4–11, 12–10, 11–13, 8–11
Ye Chaoqun	3–1	Jordi Morales	11–7, 8–11, 11–8, 11–8
Ye Chaoqun	0–3	Alvaro Valera	7–11, 8–11, 6–11
Sun Churen	2–3	Jordi Morales	16–14, 6–11, 6–11, 11–8, 11–13

6 September 2012; 09:00	Germany	3–1	Sweden

Report	Individual matches
Thorsten Schwinn	0–3	Emil Andersson	3–11, 8–11, 9–11
Jochen Wollmert	3–0	Fabian Rignell	11–5, 11–7, 13–11
Jochen Wollmert	3–2	Emil Andersson	6–11, 11–9, 11–9, 3–11, 11–9
Thorsten Schwinn	3–1	Fabian Rignell	11–13, 11–7, 11–9, 11–7

6 September 2012; 09:00	Poland	3–2	Belgium

Report	Individual matches
Piotr Grudzien	2–3	Mathieu Loicq	7–11, 4–11, 11–5, 11–5, 8–11
Marcin Skrzynecki	3–0	Marc Ledoux	11–4, 14–12, 12–10
Marcin Skrzynecki	2–3	Mathieu Loicq	11–7, 11–8, 10–12, 5–11, 9–11
Piotr Grudzien	3–0	Marc Ledoux	11–6, 11–8, 11–8
Piotr Grudzien / Marcin Skrzynecki	3–1	Mathieu Loicq / Marc Ledoux	8–11, 11–9, 14–12, 11–9

6 September 2012; 09:00	Italy	0–3	Great Britain

Report	Individual matches
Davide Scazzieri	0–3	Ross Wilson	5–11, 9–11, 2–11
Raimondo Alecci	1–3	Will Bayley	7–11, 11–13, 11–4, 6–11
Raimondo Alecci	1–3	Ross Wilson	11–5, 6–11, 8–11, 7–11

=== Semi-finals ===
6 September 2012; 19:00	Spain	3–0	Germany

Report	Individual matches
Álvaro Valera	3–0	Thorsten Schwinn	11–9, 11–9, 11–7
Jordi Morales	3–0	Jochen Wollmert	11–4, 11–2, 11–9
Álvaro Valera	3–0	Thorsten Schwinn	11–9, 11–9, 11–7

6 September 2012; 19:00	Poland	3–2	Great Britain

Report	Individual matches
Piotr Grudzień	3–1	Will Bayley	11–6, 10–12, 11–1, 11–6
Marcin Skrzynecki	2–3	Ross Wilson	8–11, 11–4, 7–11, 11–7, 8–11
Piotr Grudzień	2–3	Ross Wilson	11–5, 8–11, 11–3, 5–11, 4–11
Marcin Skrzynecki	3–2	Will Bayley	13–11, 11–7, 6–11, 10–12, 13–11
Piotr Grudzień / Marcin Skrzynecki	3–1	Aaron McKibbin / Will Bayley	8–11, 11–3, 11–7, 11–4

=== Finals ===
Gold medal match

7 September 2012; 17:00	Spain	0–3	Poland

Report	Individual matches
Álvaro Valera	1–3	Marcin Skrzynecki	4–11, 11–6, 5–11, 6–11
Jordi Morales	1–3	Piotr Grudzień	12–14, 11–8, 7–11, 5–11
Álvaro Valera	1–3	Piotr Grudzień	5–11, 13–11, 7–11, 6–11

Third place match

7 September 2012; 17:00	Germany	0–3	Great Britain

Report	Individual matches
Thorsten Schwinn	0–3	Ross Wilson	2–11, 7–11, 5–11
Jochen Wollmert	0–3	Will Bayley	9–11, 2–11, 8–11
Jochen Wollmert	0–3	Ross Wilson	10–12, 4–11, 10–12

== See also ==
- Table tennis at the 2012 Summer Paralympics
