= Table tennis at the 2012 Summer Paralympics – Men's individual – Class 8 =

Table tennis at the XIV Paralympic Games
- Venue: ExCeL Exhibition Centre
- Dates: August 30-September 3, 2012
- Competitors: 16 from 9 nations

Medalists
| 1st place, gold medalist(s) | | Zhao Shuai | China |
| 2nd place, silver medalist(s) | | Richard Csejtey | Slovakia |
| 3rd place, bronze medalist(s) | | Emil Andersson | Sweden |

The Men's individual table tennis – Class 8 tournament at the 2012 Summer Paralympics in London took place from 30 August to 3 September 2012 at ExCeL Exhibition Centre. Classes 6–10 were for athletes with a physical impairment who competed from a standing position; the lower the number, the greater the impact the impairment was on an athlete's ability to compete.

In the preliminary stage, athletes competed in four groups of three. Winners of each group qualified for the quarter-finals, together with four seeded players given byes for the preliminary round.

== Results ==
All times are local (BST/UTC+1)

=== Finals ===
Quarter-finals: 1 Sep 11:00
1 | Zhao Shuai (CHN) | 11 | 11 | 11
András Csonka (HUN) | 7 | 6 | 7
Marcin Skrzynecki (POL) | 2 | 11 | 5 | 7
4 | Ross Wilson (GBR) | 11 | 8 | 11 | 11
3 | Ye Chaoqun (CHN) | 9 | 14 | 11 | 9
Richard Csejtey (SVK) | 11 | 16 | 6 | 11
Sun Churen (CHN) | 9 | 11 | 11 | 5 | 8
2 | Emil Andersson (SWE) | 11 | 4 | 9 | 11 | 11

Semifinals: 1 Sep 19:00
1 | Zhao Shuai (CHN) | 9 | 9 | 12 | 11 | 11
4 | Ross Wilson (GBR) | 11 | 11 | 10 | 7 | 6
Richard Csejtey (SVK) | 14 | 14 | 7 | 11 | 11
2 | Emil Andersson (SWE) | 12 | 12 | 11 | 13 | 5

Gold medal match: 3 Sep 12:30
1 | Zhao Shuai (CHN) | 8 | 11 | 17 | 11
Richard Csejtey (SVK) | 11 | 5 | 15 | 4
Bronze medal match
4 | Ross Wilson (GBR) | 8 | 9 | 10
2 | Emil Andersson (SWE) | 11 | 11 | 12

=== Preliminary round ===
| Qualified for the quarter-finals |

==== Group A ====
| Athlete | Won | Lost | Games diff | Points diff |
|---|---|---|---|---|
| Richard Csejtey (SVK) | 1 | 1 | +1 | +2 |
| Saeed Ali (IRQ) | 1 | 1 | 0 | +4 |
| Piotr Grudzien (POL) | 1 | 1 | -1 | -6 |

30 August, 09:00

| Richard Csejtey (SVK) | 11 | 11 | 11 |
| Saeed Ali (IRQ) | 9 | 9 | 8 |

30 August, 18:00

| Saeed Ali (IRQ) | 11 | 12 | 11 |
| Piotr Grudzien (POL) | 8 | 10 | 5 |

31 August, 13:40

| Richard Csejtey (SVK) | 11 | 10 | 10 | 8 |
| Piotr Grudzien (POL) | 9 | 12 | 12 | 11 |

==== Group B ====
| Athlete | Won | Lost | Games diff | Points diff |
|---|---|---|---|---|
| Sun Churen (CHN) | 2 | 0 | +6 | +22 |
| Mathieu Loicq (BEL) | 1 | 1 | -2 | -12 |
| Aaron McKibbin (GBR) | 0 | 2 | -4 | -10 |

30 August, 09:00

| Sun Churen (CHN) | 11 | 11 | 11 |
| Aaron McKibbin (GBR) | 8 | 6 | 9 |

30 August, 18:00

| Aaron McKibbin (GBR) | 6 | 10 | 11 | 11 | 9 |
| Mathieu Loicq (BEL) | 11 | 12 | 7 | 6 | 11 |

31 August, 13:40

| Sun Churen (CHN) | 11 | 11 | 11 |
| Mathieu Loicq (BEL) | 9 | 5 | 7 |

==== Group C ====
| Athlete | Won | Lost | Games diff | Points diff |
|---|---|---|---|---|
| András Csonka (HUN) | 2 | 0 | +4 | +21 |
| Fabian Rignell (SWE) | 1 | 1 | -2 | -11 |
| Miroslav Jambor (SVK) | 0 | 2 | -2 | -10 |

30 August, 09:00

| András Csonka (HUN) | 11 | 9 | 8 | 11 | 11 |
| Miroslav Jambor (SVK) | 4 | 11 | 11 | 7 | 9 |

30 August, 18:40

| Miroslav Jambor (SVK) | 9 | 11 | 12 | 11 | 8 |
| Fabian Rignell (SWE) | 11 | 9 | 14 | 8 | 11 |

31 August, 13:40

| András Csonka (HUN) | 11 | 13 | 11 |
| Fabian Rignell (SWE) | 4 | 11 | 7 |

==== Group D ====
| Athlete | Won | Lost | Games diff | Points diff |
|---|---|---|---|---|
| Marcin Skrzynecki (POL) | 2 | 0 | +5 | +21 |
| Marc Ledoux (BEL) | 1 | 1 | +1 | +2 |
| Paulo Salmin (BRA) | 0 | 2 | -6 | -23 |

30 August, 09:00

| Marc Ledoux (BEL) | 11 | 11 | 11 |
| Paulo Salmin (BRA) | 9 | 7 | 8 |

30 August, 18:40

| Paulo Salmin (BRA) | 6 | 8 | 5 |
| Marcin Skrzynecki (POL) | 11 | 11 | 11 |

31 August, 13:40

| Marc Ledoux (BEL) | 9 | 12 | 6 | 9 |
| Marcin Skrzynecki (POL) | 11 | 10 | 11 | 11 |
