= Table tennis at the 2024 Summer Paralympics – Men's doubles MD18 =

Men's doubles MD18 at the XVII Paralympic Games
- Venue: South Paris Arena 4, Paris
- Dates: 29 August – 1 September 2024
- Competitors: 34 from 13 nations

Medalists
1st place, gold medalist(s)		Patryk Chojnowski; Piotr Grudzień	Poland
2nd place, silver medalist(s)		Liu Chaodong; Zhao Yiqing	China
3rd place, bronze medalist(s)		Lian Hao; Zhao Shuai	China
3rd place, bronze medalist(s)		Luiz Manara; Claudio Massad	Brazil

The men's doubles – Class 18 tournament at the 2024 Summer Paralympics in Paris will take place between 29 August and 1 September 2024 at South Paris Arena 4.

== Schedule ==
The schedule are as below:

P	Preliminary round	¼	Quarter-finals	½	Semi-finals	G	Gold medal match

Events	Dates							
Events	Thu 29 Aug		Fri 30 Aug		Sat 31 Aug		Sun 1 Sep	
Events	M	E	M	E	M	E	M	E
Men's doubles MD18	P			¼	½		G	

== Results ==
=== Medal matches ===
Semi-finals
15	L F Manara (BRA); C Massad (BRA)	5	4	11	8
17	Liu CD (CHN); Zhao YQ (CHN)	11	11	9	11
4	P Chojnowski (POL); P Grudzień (POL)	15	8	11	11
2	Lian H (CHN); Zhao S (CHN)	13	11	8	7

Gold medal match
17	Liu CD (CHN); Zhao YQ (CHN)	11	8	7
4	P Chojnowski (POL); P Grudzień (POL)	13	11	11

=== Top half ===
==== Section 1 ====
Round of 32

Round of 16
1	J Cardona (ESP); A Cepas (ESP)	11	9	9	6
15	L F Manara (BRA); C Massad (BRA)	9	11	11	11
13	Ma L (AUS); N Pellissier (AUS)	11	5	6	11	3
7	M Bohéas (FRA); T Bouvais (FRA)	7	11	11	8	11

Quarter-finals
15	L F Manara (BRA); C Massad (BRA)	5	11	11	11
7	M Bohéas (FRA); T Bouvais (FRA)	11	6	7	8

==== Section 2 ====
Round of 32
17	Liu CD (CHN); Zhao YQ (CHN)	11	11	11
16	T Leibovitz (USA); I Seidenfeld (USA)	7	9	9

Round of 16
5	L Kats (UKR); I Mai (UKR)	6	8	7
17	Liu CD (CHN); Zhao YQ (CHN)	11	11	11
10	M Chudzicki (POL); I Misztal (POL)	8	11	6	11	11
3	A McKibbin (GBR); J Stacey (GBR)	11	3	11	9	3

Quarter-finals
17	Liu CD (CHN); Zhao YQ (CHN)	11	8	11	11
10	M Chudzicki (POL); I Misztal (POL)	8	11	3	0

=== Bottom half ===
==== Section 3 ====
Round of 32

Round of 16
4	P Chojnowski (POL); P Grudzień (POL)	12	11	11	11
14	M Funayama (JPN); K Yagi (JPN)	14	7	9	0
9	E Andersson (SWE); D Gustafsson (SWE)	9	13	11	11
8	C Punpoo (THA); B Sillapakong (THA)	11	11	9	6

Quarter-finals
4	P Chojnowski (POL); P Grudzień (POL)	11	10	11	11
9	E Andersson (SWE); D Gustafsson (SWE)	7	12	3	4

==== Section 4 ====
Round of 32

Round of 16
6	L Devos (BEL); M Ledoux (BEL)	11	8	11	11
12	V Didukh (UKR); M Nikolenko (UKR)	5	11	2	8
11	A Díaz (ESP); J M Ruiz Reyes (ESP)	9	8	11	2
2	Lian H (CHN); Zhao S (CHN)	11	11	8	11

Quarter-finals
6	L Devos (BEL); M Ledoux (BEL)	4	13	5
2	Lian H (CHN); Zhao S (CHN)	11	15	11
