= Table tennis at the 2012 Summer Paralympics – Men's individual – Class 7 =

Table tennis Men's C7 at the XIV Paralympic Games
- Venue: ExCeL Exhibition Centre
- Dates: 30 August – 2 September 2012
- Competitors: 18 from 13 nations

Medalists
1st place, gold medalist(s)		Jochen Wollmert	Germany
2nd place, silver medalist(s)		Will Bayley	Great Britain
3rd place, bronze medalist(s)		Mykhaylo Popov	Ukraine

The Men's individual table tennis - Class 7 tournament at the 2012 Summer Paralympics in London took place from 30 August to 2 September 2012 at ExCeL Exhibition Centre. Classes 6–10 were for athletes with a physical impairment who competed from a standing position; the lower the number, the greater the impact the impairment was on an athlete's ability to compete.

In the preliminary stage, athletes competed in six groups of three. Winners of each group qualified for the knock-out stages.

== Results ==
All times are local (BST/UTC+1)

=== Finals ===
Quarter-finals: 1 Sep 13:15
E1	Jochen Wollmert (GER)	11	6	2	11	11
D1	Jordi Morales (ESP)	8	11	11	6	8
C1	Maksym Nikolenko (UKR)	11	11	11
F1	Stephane Messi (FRA)	7	4	5

Semifinals: 1 Sep 19:00
A1	Mykhaylo Popov (UKR)	11	7	11	5	10
E1	Jochen Wollmert (GER)	7	11	9	11	12
C1	Maksym Nikolenko (UKR)	8	3	13	5
B1	Will Bayley (GBR)	11	11	11	11

Gold medal match: 2 Sep 17:15
E1	Jochen Wollmert (GER)	11	4	11	11
B1	Will Bayley (GBR)	8	11	5	4
Bronze medal match
A1	Mykhaylo Popov (UKR)	9	13	11	11	11
C1	Maksym Nikolenko (UKR)	11	15	3	5	8

=== Preliminary round ===
Qualified for the knock-out stages

==== Group A ====
Athlete	Won	Lost	Games diff	Points diff
Mykhaylo Popov (UKR)	2	0	+6	+34
Paul Karabardak (GBR)	1	1	0	0
Kim Young-sung (KOR)	0	2	-6	-34

30 August, 17:20

Mykhaylo Popov (UKR)	11	11	11
Kim Young-sung (KOR)	6	5	4

31 August, 09:40

Kim Young-sung (KOR)	6	3	8
Paul Karabardak (GBR)	11	11	11

1 September, 09:00

Mykhaylo Popov (UKR)	11	11	11
Paul Karabardak (GBR)	8	3	6

==== Group B ====
Athlete	Won	Lost	Games diff	Points diff
Will Bayley (GBR)	2	0	+6	+24
Liao Keli (CHN)	1	1	-1	+2
Yuttana Namsaga (THA)	0	2	-5	-26

30 August, 17:20

Will Bayley (GBR)	11	11	11
Yuttana Namsaga (THA)	9	7	2

31 August, 09:40

Yuttana Namsaga (THA)	4	6	11	7
Liao Keli (CHN)	11	11	6	11

1 September, 09:00

Will Bayley (GBR)	11	11	11
Liao Keli (CHN)	9	7	8

==== Group C ====
Athlete	Won	Lost	Games diff	Points diff
Maksym Nikolenko (UKR)	2	0	+6	+20
Ben Despineux (BEL)	1	1	0	+2
Cristián Dettoni (CHI)	0	2	0	-22

30 August, 17:20

Maksym Nikolenko (UKR)	11	11	12
Cristián Dettoni (CHI)	7	7	10

31 August, 10:20

Cristián Dettoni (CHI)	10	11	3	7
Ben Despineux (BEL)	12	9	11	11

1 September, 09:00

Maksym Nikolenko (UKR)	12	11	11
Ben Despineux (BEL)	10	8	6

==== Group D ====
Athlete	Won	Lost	Games diff	Points diff
Jordi Morales (ESP)	2	0	+5	+13
Thorsten Schwinn (GER)	1	1	-1	+2
Kevin Dourbecker (FRA)	0	2	-4	-15

30 August, 17:20

Thorsten Schwinn (GER)	11	8	11	11
Kevin Dourbecker (FRA)	4	11	7	8

31 August, 10:20

Kevin Dourbecker (FRA)	8	11	7	8
Jordi Morales (ESP)	11	5	11	11

1 September, 09:00

Thorsten Schwinn (GER)	9	8	7
Jordi Morales (ESP)	11	11	11

==== Group E ====
Athlete	Won	Lost	Games diff	Points diff
Jochen Wollmert (GER)	2	0	+5	+20
Sayed Youssef (EGY)	1	1	-1	-6
Zbynek Lambert (CZE)	0	2	-4	-14

30 August, 18:00

Jochen Wollmert (GER)	11	11	11	11
Zbynek Lambert (CZE)	13	9	7	9

31 August, 10:20

Zbynek Lambert (CZE)	6	7	11	11
Sayed Youssef (EGY)	11	11	8	13

1 September, 09:40

Jochen Wollmert (GER)	11	11	11
Sayed Youssef (EGY)	8	9	2

==== Group F ====
Athlete	Won	Lost	Games diff	Points diff
Stephane Messi (FRA)	2	0	+6	+36
Daniel Horut (CZE)	1	1	0	+1
Davide Scazzieri (ITA)	0	2	-6	-37

30 August, 18:00

Stephane Messi (FRA)	11	11	11
Davide Scazzieri (ITA)	4	2	4

31 August, 10:20

Davide Scazzieri (ITA)	6	8	5
Daniel Horut (CZE)	11	11	11

1 September, 09:40

Stephane Messi (FRA)	11	11	11
Daniel Horut (CZE)	6	6	8
