= List of para table tennis tournaments =

This is a list of international para table tennis tournaments. The list also contains the most recent winners to have won titles in each event.

== Current events ==
As of 2019. Bold events are new para table tennis events.

Competition	Hosts	Year debut	Occurrence	Factor	Singles	Doubles	Teams	Most titles
Al-Watani Championships	(Jordan) Amman	2008	Annually	Fa20	Yes	No	Yes	(Jordan) Khetam Abuawad (17 titles)
Alukor Cup/Hungarian Open	(Hungary) Budapest (1997-2009); Eger (2011–present)	1997	Every 2 years		Yes	No	Yes	(Slovakia) Ján Riapoš (11 titles)
Arafura Games	(Australia) Darwin	2011			Yes	Yes	Yes	(Indonesia) Adyos Astan (3 titles)
Bangkok Open	(Thailand) Bangkok	2019		Fa20				
Bayreuth Open	(Germany) Bayreuth	2011	Every 2 years		Yes	No	Yes	(Denmark) Peter Rosenmeier (5 titles)
Belgian Open	(Belgium) Sint-Niklaas	2013	Every 2 years		Yes	No	Yes	(France) Fabien Lamirault (4 titles)
Copa Costa Rica	(Costa Rica) San Jose (2010, 2014-2019); Heredia (2011)	2010		Fa20	Yes	No	Yes	(Russia) Vladimir Toporkov (3 titles)
Copa Cristina Hoffmann	(Mexico) Cancún	2019		Fa20				
Copa Tango	(Argentina) Buenos Aires	2001	Annually	Fa20	Yes	No	Yes	(Argentina) Gabriel Copola (13 titles)
Copa Tango Junior	(Argentina) Buenos Aires	2016		Fa20	Yes	No	No	
Costa Brava Open	(Spain) Platja d'Aro	2019		Fa20				
Czech Open	(Czech Republic) Ostrava	1997	Annually	Fa20	Yes	No	Yes	(Poland) Rafal Czuper (6 titles)
Dutch Open	(Netherlands) Stadskanaal	2019		Fa20				
Egypt Open	(Egypt) Alexandria	2019		Fa20				
Finland Open	(Finland) Lahti	2019		Fa20				
Japan Open	(Japan) Tokyo	2019		Fa20				
Lignano Master Open	(Italy) Lignano	2007	Annually	Fa20	Yes	No	Yes	(Serbia) Borislava Perić (14 titles) (Ukraine) Viktor Didukh (12 titles)
Polish Open	(Poland) Wladyslawowo	2003	Annually	Fa20	Yes	No	Yes	(Norway) Tommy Urhaug (11 titles)
PTT China Open (formerly China Open)	(China) Beijing	2010	Annually	Fa40	Yes	No	Yes	(China) Feng Panfeng (8 titles)
PTT Indonesia Open	(Indonesia) Karanganyar (2016); Jakarta (2018)	2016	Every 2 years		Yes	No	Yes	(Thailand) Rungroj Thainiyom (6 titles)
PTT Korea Open	(South Korea) Incheon (2013); Ulsan (2015); Mungyeong (2017)	2013	Every 2 years		Yes	No	Yes	(South Korea) Kim Young Gun (3 titles)
PTT Spanish Open	(Spain) El Prat de Llobregat (2014-2017); Sant Cugat del Valles (June 2018); Almeria (November 2018); Girona (2019)	2014	Annually		Yes	No	Yes	(Spain) Jose Manuel Ruiz Reyes (6 titles)
PTT Thailand Open	(Thailand) Pattaya (2014-2016, 2018); Suphanburi (2017)	2014	Annually		Yes	No	Yes	(Thailand) Wanchai Chaiwut (6 titles)
Slovakia Open	(Slovakia) Piešťany (1998-2011); Bratislava (2012-2018)	1998	Annually		Yes	No	Yes	(Spain) Alvaro Valera (8 titles)
Slovenian Open (table tennis)	(Slovenia) Lasko (2004-2006, 2008-); Kranjska Gora (2007)	2004	Annually	Fa40	Yes	No	Yes	(Germany) Thomas Schmidberger (11 titles)
Taichung Open	(Taiwan) Taichung	2011	Every 2 years		Yes	No	Yes	
US Open	(United States) Houston (1997,1998); Fort Lauderdale (1999-2002); Colorado Springs (2003); Las Vegas (2005-2006, 2016-2017); Chicago (2007); Milwaukee (2011)	1997			Yes	No	Yes	(United States) Tahl Leibovitz

== Defunct events ==
These events feature the last winners of each tournament.

Competition	Host(s)	Year debut	Last year
Azur Open	(France) Frejus	2002	2003
Brazil Open	(Brazil) Brasília (2009); Rio de Janeiro (2010, 2011)	2009	2011
British Open	(United Kingdom) Sheffield	1997	2011
Cope Chile	(Chile) Santiago	2015	2016
French Open	(France) Nantes	2010	2012
German Open	(Germany) Wuppertal (2005–2008); Stuttgart (2009)	2005	2009
Ibero American Championships	(Spain) Granada (1998); La Coruna (2001)	1998	2001
International Etna Cup	(Italy) Catania	2004	2005
Irish Open	(Republic of Ireland) Dublin	1998	2007
Lignano Master Junior Open	Italy	2016	2017
Mike Dempsey Memorial Table Tennis Championships	(United States) San Diego	2012	2013
Norwegian Open	(Norway) Oslo	2003	2005
Romania International Table Tennis Junior Open	(Romania) Cluj-Napoca	2016	2017
Romania International Table Tennis Open	(Romania) Cluj-Napoca	2007	2017
Serbia Open	(Serbia) Novi Sad	2006	2007
T.T. International Master Italians Open	(Italy) Portogruaro (1997–1999); Bibione (2000–2002); Forte dei Marmi (2003); Jesolo (2004, 2005); Lignano (2006)	1988	2006
Tetra Open Cologne	(Germany) Cologne	2004	2010
Trofeo del Mediterraneo	(Italy) Agrigento	1998	2007
