= Tunde Adisa =

Nigerian para table tennis player

Personal information
- Born: 10 October 1970 (age 55)

Sport
- Country: Nigeria
- Sport: Para table tennis
Medal record
Men's para table tennis (class 9)
Representing Nigeria
Paralympic Games
Gold medal – first place	2000 Sydney	Teams C9
African Championships
Gold medal – first place	1999 Johannesburg	Open singles standing
Gold medal – first place	1999 Johannesburg	Teams C9
Gold medal – first place	2011 Ismailia	Singles C9
Gold medal – first place	2011 Ismailia	Teams C9
Silver medal – second place	1999 Johannesburg	Singles C9

Tunde Adisa (born 10 October 1970) is a Nigerian para table tennis player of class 9 and Paralympian.

He represented Nigeria at the 2000 Summer Paralympics held in Sydney, Australia and also at the 2012 Summer Paralympics held in London, United Kingdom.

In 2000, he won the gold medal at the team event together with Tajudeen Agunbiade and Femi Alabi. He also competed in the Men's individual event, but did not win a medal.

He also won the gold medals in the individual and team class 9 events in the 2011 African Para Table Tennis Championships held in Ismailia, Egypt.
