= Table tennis at the 2012 Summer Paralympics =

Table tennis at the XIV Paralympic Games
- Venue: ExCeL Exhibition Centre
- Dates: 30 August – 8 September 2012
- Competitors: 276 (174 men, 102 women) from 47 nations

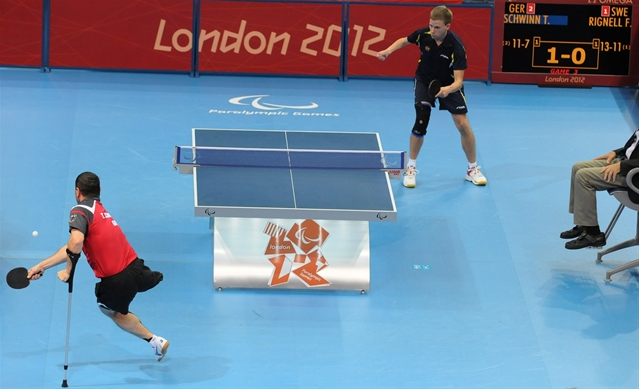

Table tennis at the 2012 Summer Paralympics in London took place from Thursday 30 August to Saturday 8 September 2012 at ExCeL Exhibition Centre. 276 athletes, 174 men and 102 women, competed in 29 events. Table tennis events have been held at the Paralympics since the first Games in Rome in 1960.

== Events ==
Twenty-nine events were contested. The events were men's and women's team and individual competitions for the various disability classifications.

- Men's singles
  - Class 1
  - Class 2
  - Class 3
  - Class 4
  - Class 5
  - Class 6
  - Class 7
  - Class 8
  - Class 9
  - Class 10
  - Class 11

- Men's team
  - Class 1–2
  - Class 3
  - Class 4–5
  - Class 6–8
  - Class 9–10

- Women's singles
  - Class 1–2
  - Class 3
  - Class 4
  - Class 5
  - Class 6
  - Class 7
  - Class 8
  - Class 9
  - Class 10
  - Class 11

- Women's team
  - Class 1–3
  - Class 4–5
  - Class 6–10

== Participating nations ==
- Argentina (4)
- Australia (2)
- Austria (6)
- Belgium (3)
- Brazil (14)
- Chile (1)
- China (28)
- Chinese Taipei (5)
- Croatia (4)
- Czech Republic (6)
- Denmark (1)
- Egypt (8)
- Finland (1)
- France (28)
- Germany (12)
- Great Britain (13)
- Hong Kong (5)
- Hungary (3)
- Indonesia (1)
- Iran (1)
- Iraq (1)
- Ireland (4)
- Israel (2)
- Italy (10)
- Japan (3)
- Jordan (3)
- Malaysia (2)
- Mexico (1)
- Netherlands (4)
- Nigeria (2)
- Norway (3)
- Philippines (1)
- Poland (12)
- Romania (1)
- Russia (9)
- Serbia (3)
- Slovakia (8)
- Slovenia (2)
- South Korea (23)
- Spain (6)
- Sweden (8)
- Switzerland (1)
- Thailand (4)
- Turkey (6)
- Ukraine (7)
- United States (3)
- Venezuela (1)

== Medal summary ==
=== Medal table ===
Rank	Nation	Gold	Silver	Bronze	Total
1	China (CHN)	14	5	2	21
2	Poland (POL)	3	1	1	5
3	Germany (GER)	2	1	1	4
3	Slovakia (SVK)	2	1	1	4
5	South Korea (KOR)	1	4	4	9
6	Sweden (SWE)	1	1	3	5
7	Russia (RUS)	1	1	1	3
8	Hong Kong (HKG)	1	1	0	2
9	Netherlands (NED)	1	0	1	2
10	Hungary (HUN)	1	0	0	1
10	Norway (NOR)	1	0	0	1
10	Thailand (THA)	1	0	0	1
13	France (FRA)	0	3	5	8
14	Spain (ESP)	0	2	1	3
15	Austria (AUT)	0	2	0	2
15	Serbia (SRB)	0	2	0	2
15	Turkey (TUR)	0	2	0	2
18	Great Britain (GBR)	0	1	3	4
18	Ukraine (UKR)	0	1	3	4
20	Italy (ITA)	0	1	0	1
21	Denmark (DEN)	0	0	1	1
21	Egypt (EGY)	0	0	1	1
21	Indonesia (INA)	0	0	1	1
Totals (23 entries)		29	29	29	87

=== Men's events ===
Event	Gold	Silver	Bronze
Men's Individual – Class 1	Holger Nikelis; Germany	Jean-François Ducay; France	Paul Davies; Great Britain
Men's Individual – Class 2	Ján Riapoš; Slovakia	Kyung-Mook Kim; South Korea	Fabien Lamirault; France
Men's Individual – Class 3	Feng Panfeng; China	Zlatko Kesler; Serbia	Thomas Schmidberger; Germany
Men's Individual – Class 4	Kim Young-Gun; South Korea	Zhang Yan; China	Sameh Saleh; Egypt
Men's Individual – Class 5	Tommy Urhaug; Norway	Cao Ningning; China	Jung Eun-Chang; South Korea
Men's Individual – Class 6	Rungroj Thainiyom; Thailand	Álvaro Valera; Spain	Peter Rosenmeier; Denmark
Men's Individual – Class 7	Jochen Wollmert; Germany	Will Bayley; Great Britain	Mykhaylo Popov; Ukraine
Men's Individual – Class 8	Zhao Shuai; China	Richard Csejtey; Slovakia	Emil Andersson; Sweden
Men's Individual – Class 9	Ma Lin; China	Stanislaw Fraczyk; Austria	Gerben Last; Netherlands
Men's Individual – Class 10	Patryk Chojnowski; Poland	Ge Yang; China	David Jacobs; Indonesia
Men's Individual – Class 11	Péter Pálos; Hungary	Son Byeong-jun; South Korea	Pascal Pereira-Leal; France
Men's Team Class 1–2	Slovakia (SVK); Ján Riapoš; Martin Ludrovský; Rastislav Revúcky	France (FRA); Vincent Boury; Fabien Lamirault; Stephane Molliens	South Korea (KOR); Kim Kong Yong; Kim Min-gyu; Kim Kyung Mook; Lee Chang-ho
Men's Team – Class 3	China (CHN); Feng Panfeng; Zhao Ping; Gao Yanming	Germany (GER); Thomas Schmidberger; Jan Gürtler; Thomas Brüchle; Holger Nikelis	France (FRA); Yann Guilhem; Florian Merrien; Jean-Philippe Robin
Men's Team – Class 4–5	China (CHN); Cao Ningning; Zhang Yan; Guo Xingyuan	South Korea (KOR); Jung Eun Chang; Kim Young Gun; Choi Il Sang; Kim Jung Gil	France (FRA); Maxime Thomas; Grégory Rosec; Nicolas Savant-Aira; Émeric Martin
Men's Team – Class 6–8	Poland (POL); Piotr Grudzień; Marcin Skrzynecki	Spain (ESP); Álvaro Valera; Jordi Morales	Great Britain (GBR); Ross Wilson; Will Bayley; Aaron McKibbin
Men's Team – Class 9–10	China (CHN); Ma Lin; Lian Hao; Lu Xiaolei; Ge Yang	Poland (POL); Patryk Chojnowski; Sebastian Powroźniak	Spain (ESP); Jorge Cardona; José Manuel Ruiz Reyes

=== Women's events ===
Event	Gold	Silver	Bronze
Women's Individual – Class 1–2	Jing Liu; China	Pamela Pezzutto; Italy	Isabelle Lafaye-Marziou; France
Women's Individual – Class 3	Anna-Carin Ahlquist; Sweden	Doris Mader; Austria	Alena Kánová; Slovakia
Women's Individual – Class 4	Zhou Ying; China	Borislava Perić; Serbia	Sung-Hye Moon; South Korea
Women's Individual – Class 5	Bian Zhang; China	Gai Gu; China	Ingela Lundbäck; Sweden
Women's Individual – Class 6	Raisa Chebanika; Russia	Antonina Khodzynska; Ukraine	Yuliya Klymenko; Ukraine
Women's Individual – Class 7	Kelly van Zon; Netherlands	Yulia Ovsyannikova; Russia	Viktoriia Safonova; Ukraine
Women's Individual – Class 8	Jingdian Mao; China	Thu Kamkasomphou; France	Josefin Abrahamsson; Sweden
Women's Individual – Class 9	Lina Lei; China	Neslihan Kavas; Turkey	Liu Meili; China
Women's Individual – Class 10	Natalia Partyka; Poland	Qian Yang; China	Fan Lei; China
Women's Individual – Class 11	Wong Ka Man; Hong Kong	Yeung Chi Ka; Hong Kong	Anzhelika Kosacheva; Russia
Women's Team – Class 1–3	China (CHN); Liu Jing; Li Qian	South Korea (KOR); Cho Kyoung Hee; Choi Hyun Ja; Jung Sang Sook	Great Britain (GBR); Jane Campbell; Sara Head
Women's Team – Class 4–5	China (CHN); Gu Gai; Zhang Bian; Zhang Miao; Zhou Ying	Sweden (SWE); Anna-Carin Ahlquist; Ingela Lundbäck	South Korea (KOR); Jung Ji Nam; Jung Young-A; Moon Sung Hye
Women's Team – Class 6–10	China (CHN); Fan Lei; Lei Lina; Liu Meili; Yang Qian	Turkey (TUR); Ümran Ertiş; Neslihan Kavas; Kübra Öçsoy	Poland (POL); Alicja Eigner; Małgorzata Jankowska; Natalia Partyka; Karolina Pek

== See also ==
- Table tennis at the 2012 Summer Olympics
