= Aaron McKibbin =

British table tennis player (born 1991)

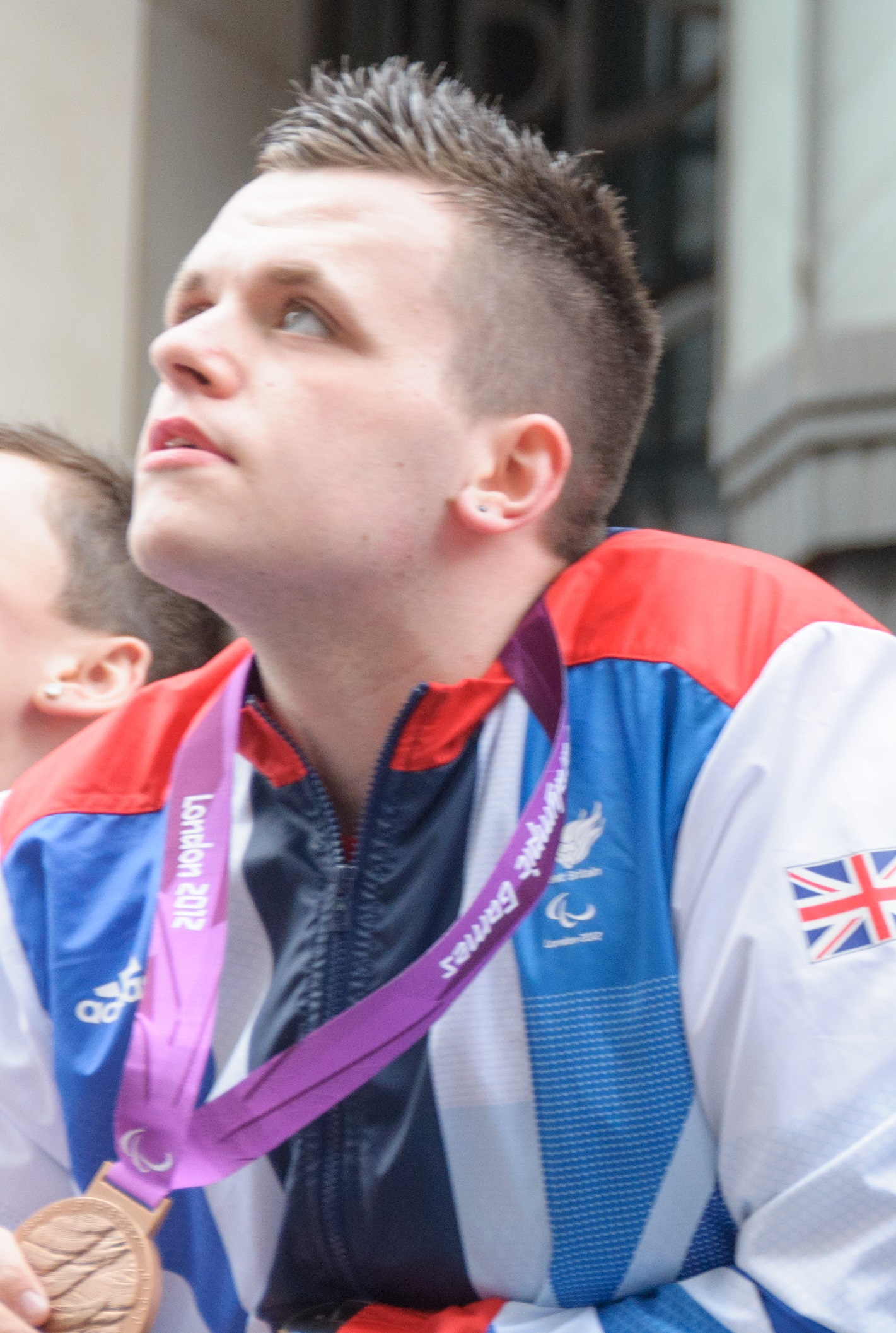
- McKibbin at the parade following the 2012 Summer Paralympics

Personal information
- Nationality: British
- Born: 27 August 1991 (age 34) London, England

Sport
- Country: Great Britain
- Sport: Table tennis
- Event: Class 8

Achievements and titles
- Paralympic finals: 2012
Medal record
Representing Great Britain
table tennis
Paralympic Games
Bronze medal – third place	2012 London	Team – Class 6–8
Bronze medal – third place	2016 Rio de Janeiro	Team – Class 6–8
Bronze medal – third place	2020 Tokyo	Team – Class 8
European Championships
Bronze medal – third place	2015 Vejle	Men's team – Class 8

Aaron McKibbin (born 27 August 1991) is an English Paralympic table tennis player. McKibben represented Great Britain at the 2012 Summer Paralympics and won a bronze medal in the Men's team – Class 6–8.

== Personal history ==
McKibben was born in London in 1991. McKibben was born with bilateral talipes (club foot) and underwent corrective surgery in the first weeks after his birth.

== Table tennis career ==
McKibbin began playing table tennis at the age of four and continued playing throughout his youth, competing in the UK school championships. At the age of 16 his coach suggested that he try out for the Great Britain Paralympic team, even though McKibben did not see himself as having a disability. He was classified as a Class 8 table tennis player and represented Britain in the European Championships in Split in 2011. There he finished fourth in the men's singles Class 8.

McKibbin qualified for the 2012 Summer Paralympics competing in both the Men's singles - Class 8 and the Men's team, Class 6-8. In the singles tournament, McKibbin was placed in Group B with China's Sun Churen and Belgium's Mathieu Loicq. McKibbin failed to progress through the preliminary rounds after losing both his matches. In the class 6-8 team event, McKibbin was joined by teammates Ross Wilson and Will Bayley. The British team were given a bye in the first round, facing Italy in the quarter-finals whom they beat 3-0. In the semi-finals Britain lost a close encounter to eventual gold medalists Poland, but a comprehensive win over Germany in the third place match saw the British team pick up the bronze medal, McKibbin's first major international medal.

In 2015 McKibbin again teamed up with Ross Wilson at the Para Table Tennis European Championship where they won the bronze in the Class 8 Men's team event. In November that year McKibbin travelled to Beijing to take part in a PTT Open. At the open he beat Arufuahirokazu Tateishi of Japan (3-0) and former European champion Marcin Skrzynecki from Poland (3-1) to set up a final against World number two Ye Chaoqun of China. A 3-1 victory over his opponent saw McKibbin take the gold medal and qualify for the 2016 Summer Paralympics in Rio.
