= Table tennis at the 2024 Summer Paralympics – Mixed doubles XD17 =

Mixed doubles XD17 at the XVII Paralympic Games
- Venue: South Paris Arena 4, Paris
- Dates: 29 – 31 August 2024
- Competitors: 46 from 16 nations
- Teams: 23

Medalists
1st place, gold medalist(s)		Zhao Shuai; Mao Jingdian	China
2nd place, silver medalist(s)		Peng Weinan; Xiong Guiyan	China
3rd place, bronze medalist(s)		Piotr Grudzień; Karolina Pęk	Poland
3rd place, bronze medalist(s)		Viktor Didukh; Iryna Shynkarova	Ukraine

The mixed doubles – Class 17 tournament at the 2024 Summer Paralympics in Paris will take place between 29 and 31 August 2024 at South Paris Arena 4.

== Schedule ==
The schedule are as below:

P	Preliminary round	¼	Quarter-finals	½	Semi-finals	G	Gold medal match

Events	Dates					
Events	Thu 29 Aug		Fri 30 Aug		Sat 31 Aug	
Events	M	E	M	E	M	E
Mixed doubles XD17	P		¼		½	G

== Results ==
=== Medal matches ===
Semi-finals
1	P Grudzień (POL); K Pęk (POL)	4	5	11	11	8
3	Peng WN (CHN); Xiong GY (CHN)	11	11	8	9	11
4	Zhao S (CHN); Mao JD (CHN)	9	9	11	11	12
5	V Didukh (UKR); I Shynkarova (UKR)	11	11	9	6	10

Gold medal match
3	Peng WN (CHN); Xiong GY (CHN)	9	6	8
4	Zhao S (CHN); Mao JD (CHN)	11	11	11

=== Top half ===
==== Section 1 ====
Round of 32
11	K Iwabuchi (JPN); Y Tomono (JPN)	11	11	11
23	B Simion (ROU); C Ciripan (ROU)	4	8	5

Round of 16
1	P Grudzień (POL); K Pęk (POL)	11	11	11
14	I Mai (UKR); M Lytovchenko (UKR)	8	6	6
11	K Iwabuchi (JPN); Y Tomono (JPN)	9	11	7	6
7	L F Manara (BRA); D Rauen (BRA)	11	7	11	11

Quarter-finals
1	P Grudzień (POL); K Pęk (POL)	8	8	13	11	11
7	L F Manara (BRA); D Rauen (BRA)	11	11	11	4	9

==== Section 2 ====
Round of 32
17	B Zohil (CRO); M Lučić (CRO)	11	11	13
16	T Rau (GER); J Wolf (GER)	8	2	11
9	M Bohéas (FRA); M Caillaud (FRA)	11	11	11
21	S Youssef (EGY); H Hammad (EGY)	8	2	7

Round of 16
8	N Pellissier (AUS); Lei LN (AUS)	10	11	6	11	9
17	B Zohil (CRO); M Lučić (CRO)	12	9	11	8	11
9	M Bohéas (FRA); M Caillaud (FRA)	6	5	1
3	Peng WN (CHN); Xiong GY (CHN)	11	11	11

Quarter-finals
17	B Zohil (CRO); M Lučić (CRO)	9	7	9
3	Peng WN (CHN); Xiong GY (CHN)	11	11	11

=== Bottom half ===
==== Section 3 ====
Round of 32
20	B Schnake (GER); S Grebe (GER)	2	3	6
12	J-P Montanus (NED); K van Zon (NED)	11	11	11
15	J Stacey (GBR); B Twomey (GBR)	11	7	11	11
22	K Alabi (NGR); F Obazuaye (NGR)	6	11	6	6

Round of 16
4	Zhao S (CHN); Mao JD (CHN)	11	9	10	11	11
12	J-P Montanus (NED); K van Zon (NED)	8	11	12	4	5
15	J Stacey (GBR); B Twomey (GBR)	11	11	11
6	P Chojnowski (POL); K Marszał (POL)	6	6	9

Quarter-finals
4	Zhao S (CHN); Mao JD (CHN)	11	12	11
15	J Stacey (GBR); B Twomey (GBR)	3	10	5

==== Section 4 ====
Round of 32
18	I Torres (CHI); F Pérez (CHI)	9	7	5
13	L Didier (FRA); T Kamkasomphou (FRA)	11	11	11
10	J Hansson (SWE); A Händén (SWE)	17	9	11	11
19	T Hirth (AUS); M Tapper (AUS)	15	11	9	7

Round of 16
5	V Didukh (UKR); I Shynkarova (UKR)	11	11	11
13	L Didier (FRA); T Kamkasomphou (FRA)	6	5	7
10	J Hansson (SWE); A Händén (SWE)	1	4	8
2	P Salmin (BRA); B Alexandre (BRA)	11	11	11

Quarter-finals
5	V Didukh (UKR); I Shynkarova (UKR)	11	11	11
2	P Salmin (BRA); B Alexandre (BRA)	7	4	9
