= Iryna Shynkarova =

Ukrainian para table tennis player

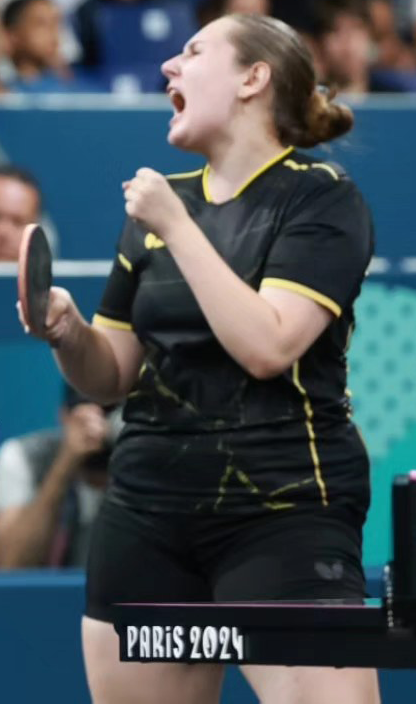
- Shynkarova at the 2024 Summer Paralympics

Personal information
- Nationality: Ukrainian
- Born: 10 March 2005 (age 21)
- Home town: Mykolaiv, Ukraine

Sport
- Sport: Para table tennis
- Disability class: C9
Medal record
Para table tennis
Representing Ukraine
Paralympic Games
| Bronze medal – third place | 2024 Paris | Mixed doubles XD17 |

Iryna Shynkarova (born 10 March 2005) is a Ukrainian para table tennis player. She represented Ukraine at the 2024 Summer Paralympics.

== Career ==
Shynkarova represented Ukraine at the 2024 Summer Paralympics in the mixed doubles XD17 event, along with Viktor Didukh, and won a bronze medal.
