= Sweden at the 2012 Summer Paralympics =

- IPC code: SWE
- NPC: Swedish Parasports Federation

in London
- Competitors: 59 in 12 sports
- Flag bearer: Jonas Jacobsson (opening)
- Medals Ranked 29th: Gold 4 Silver 4 Bronze 4 Total 12

Summer Paralympics appearances (overview)
- 1960; 1964; 1968; 1972; 1976; 1980; 1984; 1988; 1992; 1996; 2000; 2004; 2008; 2012; 2016; 2020; 2024

Sweden competed at the 2012 Summer Paralympics in London, United Kingdom, from 29 August to 9 September 2012.

== Medalists ==
Medal	Name	Sport	Event	Date
Gold	Anna-Carin Ahlquist	Table tennis	Women's singles class 3	3 September
Gold	Maja Reichard	Swimming	Women's 100 m breaststroke SB11	3 September
Gold	Jonas Jacobsson	Shooting	Men's 50 m rifle 3 positions SH1	5 September
Gold	Stefan Olsson; Peter Vikström	Wheelchair tennis	Men's doubles	7 September
Silver	Jonas Jacobsson	Shooting	Men's 10 m air rifle standing SH1	31 August
Silver	Anders Olsson	Swimming	Men's 400 m freestyle S6	1 September
Silver	Jeffrey Ige	Athletics	Men's shot put F20	7 September
Silver	Anna-Carin Ahlquist; Ingela Lundbäck	Table tennis	Women's team C4–5	8 September
Bronze	Josefin Abrahamsson	Table tennis	Women's singles class 8	2 September
Bronze	Ingela Lundbäck	Table tennis	Women's singles class 5	2 September
Bronze	Emil Andersson	Table tennis	Men's singles class 8	3 September
Bronze	Sweden women's national goalball team: Viktoria Andersson; Anna Dahlberg; Malin Gustavsson; Josefin Jälmestål; Sofia Naesström; Maria Wåglund	Goalball	Women's	7 September

Medals by sport
Sport	Gold medal	Silver medal	Bronze medal	Total
Table tennis	1	1	3	5
Shooting	1	1	0	2
Swimming	1	1	0	2
Wheelchair tennis	1	0	0	1
Athletics	0	1	0	1
Goalball	0	0	1	1
Total	4	4	4	12

== Archery ==
Men

Athlete	Event	Ranking round		Round of 32	Round of 16	Quarterfinals	Semifinals	Finals	
Athlete	Event	Score	Seed	Opposition score	Opposition score	Opposition score	Opposition score	Opposition score	Rank
Robert Larsson	Ind. compound open	636	19	Lee (KOR); W 7–3	Hancı (TUR); L 1–7	Did not advance			

Women

Athlete	Event	Ranking round		Round of 32	Round of 16	Quarterfinals	Semifinals	Finals	
Athlete	Event	Score	Seed	Opposition score	Opposition score	Opposition score	Opposition score	Opposition score	Rank
Zandra Reppe	Ind. compound open	642	7	—N/a	Polegaeva (RUS); L 4–6	Did not advance			

== Athletics ==
Athlete	Event	Heat		Final	
Athlete	Event	Result	Rank	Result	Rank
Niklas Almers	Men's 100 m T54	14.89	13	Did not advance	
Jeffrey Ige	Men's shot put F20	—N/a		15.50 ER	2nd place, silver medalist(s)
Per Jonsson	Men's 200 m T13	24.42	19	Did not advance	
Per Jonsson	Men's long jump F13	—N/a		6.48	4
Tobias Jonsson	Men's 200 m T13	Did not start		Did not advance	
Tobias Jonsson	Men's long jump F13	—N/a		5.83	10
Rickard Straht	Men's long jump F11	—N/a		5.67	7
Emma Eriksson	Women's long jump F20	—N/a		4.78	5
Gunilla Wallengren	Women's 400 m T54	58.24	8 q	58.74	8
Gunilla Wallengren	Women's 800 m T54	1:57.14	11	Did not advance	
Gunilla Wallengren	Women's 1500 m T54	3:33.53	6 q	3:39.02	9

== Boccia ==
Athlete	Event	Seeding Match	Round of 16	Quarterfinals	Semifinals	Final	Rank
Athlete	Event	Opposition Result	Opposition Result	Opposition Result	Opposition Result	Opposition Result	Rank
Christoffer Hagdahl	Individual BC3	Martins (BRA); L 2–6	Peña Cortes (ESP); L 2–3	Did not advance			

== Cycling ==
Athlete	Event	Final	
Athlete	Event	Result	Rank
Jessica Hedlund	Women's road race H4	1:48:42	4
Jessica Hedlund	Women's time trial H4	34:14.31	4

== Equestrian ==
Athlete	Horse	Event	Final	
Athlete	Horse	Event	Result	Rank
Anita Johnsson	Donar	Individual Championship test grade Ia	68.050	9
Anita Johnsson	Donar	Individual Freestyle test grade Ia	66.800	10

== Goalball ==
=== Men's tournament ===
Roster

Name	Date of birth (age)	Club	Residence
Stefan Gahne	15 January 1982 (aged 30)	Malmö FIFH	Malmö
Niklas Hultqvist	27 December 1982 (aged 29)	IFAS	Stockholm
Piotr Lawniczak	8 January 1981 (aged 31)	IFAS	Handen
Magnus Rendahl	25 November 1990 (aged 21)	IFAS	Nacka
Fatmir Seremeti	10 April 1983 (aged 29)	Malmö FIFH	Malmö
Mikael Åkerberg	1 July 1982 (aged 30)	Hammarby IF	Farsta

Group stage

Team	Pld	W	D	L	GF	GA	GD	Pts	Qualification
Turkey	5	4	1	0	26	6	+20	13	Quarterfinals
Brazil	5	3	0	2	30	20	+10	9	Quarterfinals
Lithuania	5	2	2	1	33	20	+13	8	Quarterfinals
Finland	5	2	0	3	16	24	−8	6	Quarterfinals
Sweden	5	1	2	2	16	25	−9	5	Eliminated
Great Britain	5	0	1	4	9	35	−26	1	Eliminated

Source: "London 2012 Paralympic Games - Goalball results" (PDF). Paralympic.org. 2012-10-03 – via Goalball.sport.

30 August 2012; 11:30	Turkey	9 – 2	Sweden	Copper Box, London; Referees: Shinji Mizuno (JPN), Carla Da Matta (BRA)
30 August 2012; 11:30	Alkan 3 Düzgün 3 Uçar 2 Karakaya 1	Report	Seremati 2	Copper Box, London; Referees: Shinji Mizuno (JPN), Carla Da Matta (BRA)

31 August 2012; 13:45	Brazil	4 – 5	Sweden	Copper Box, London; Referees: Christl Daentler (GER), Tony Connolly (USA)
31 August 2012; 13:45	Leo. Moreno da Silva 2 Marques 1 Santos Silvestre 1	Report	Hultqvist 4 Gahne 1	Copper Box, London; Referees: Christl Daentler (GER), Tony Connolly (USA)

1 September 2012; 10:15	Sweden	3 – 3	Great Britain	Copper Box, London; Referees: Bülent Kimyon (TUR), Kimberly Anderson (USA)
1 September 2012; 10:15	Hultqvist 2 Seremati 1	Report	Graham 1 Knott 1 Sharkey 1	Copper Box, London; Referees: Bülent Kimyon (TUR), Kimberly Anderson (USA)

2 September 2012; 19:45	Sweden	5 – 5	Lithuania	Copper Box, London; Referees: Janne Ahokas (FIN), Hooshang Shariati (IRI)
2 September 2012; 19:45	Seremati 5	Report	Pavliukianec 2 Panovas 2 Juchna 1	Copper Box, London; Referees: Janne Ahokas (FIN), Hooshang Shariati (IRI)

4 September 2012; 17:15	Finland	4 – 1	Sweden	Copper Box, London; Referees: Hooshang Shariati (IRI), Dawna Christy (CAN)
4 September 2012; 17:15	Mattila 4	Report	Seremeti 1	Copper Box, London; Referees: Hooshang Shariati (IRI), Dawna Christy (CAN)

=== Women's tournament ===
Roster

Name	Date of birth (age)	Club	Residence
Viktoria Andersson	16 January 1985 (aged 27)	IFAS	Farsta
Anna Dahlberg	12 September 1980 (aged 31)	Hammarby IF	Sundbyberg
Malin Gustavsson	17 November 1970 (aged 41)	MIS Göteborg	Gothenburg
Josefin Jälmestål	11 October 1978 (aged 33)	IFAS	Farsta
Sofia Naesström	29 April 1979 (aged 33)	Hammarby IF	Farsta
Maria Wåglund	26 March 1984 (aged 28)	IFAS	Stockholm

Group stage

Team	Pld	W	D	L	GF	GA	GD	Pts	Qualification
Canada	4	3	0	1	6	3	+3	9	Quarterfinals
Japan	4	2	1	1	5	3	+2	7	Quarterfinals
Sweden	4	2	1	1	11	11	0	7	Quarterfinals
United States	4	2	0	2	9	4	+5	6	Quarterfinals
Australia	4	0	0	4	7	17	−10	0	Eliminated

Source: "London 2012 Paralympic Games - Goalball results" (PDF). Paralympic.org. 2012-10-03 – via Goalball.sport.

30 August 2012; 21:00	United States	5 – 1	Sweden	Copper Box, London; Referees: Yasser Oman (EGY), Warrick Jackes (AUS)
30 August 2012; 21:00	Armbruster 3 Czechowski 1 Miller 1	Report	Jälmestål 1	Copper Box, London; Referees: Yasser Oman (EGY), Warrick Jackes (AUS)

1 September 2012; 13:45	Canada	1 – 2	Sweden	Copper Box, London; Referees: Bulent Kimyor (TUR), Thomas Bärz (GER)
1 September 2012; 13:45	Kneebone 1	Report	Gustavsson 2	Copper Box, London; Referees: Bulent Kimyor (TUR), Thomas Bärz (GER)

2 September 2012; 11:30	Sweden	0 – 0	Japan	Copper Box, London; Referees: Tony Collonny (USA), Christl Däntler (GER)
2 September 2012; 11:30		Report		Copper Box, London; Referees: Tony Collonny (USA), Christl Däntler (GER)

4 September 2012; 12:30	Sweden	8 – 5	Australia	Copper Box, London; Referees: Hooshang Shariati (IRI), Janne Ahokas (FIN)
4 September 2012; 12:30	Gustavsson 5 Naesström 2 Jälmestål 1	Report	Esdaile 3 Christensen 2	Copper Box, London; Referees: Hooshang Shariati (IRI), Janne Ahokas (FIN)

Quarter-final

5 September 2012; 12:45	Great Britain	1 – 2	Sweden	Copper Box, London; Referees: Carla Da Matta (BRA), Thomas Baerz (GER)
5 September 2012; 12:45	Sharkey 1	Report	Gustavsson 2	Copper Box, London; Referees: Carla Da Matta (BRA), Thomas Baerz (GER)

Semi-final

6 September 2012; 15:00	Sweden	3 – 4 (a.e.t.)	Japan	Copper Box, London; Referees: Dina Murdie (GBR), Launel Scott (CAN)
6 September 2012; 15:00	Gustavsson 1 Jälmestål 1 Wåglund 1	Report	Komiya 2 Adachi 1 Urata 1	Copper Box, London; Referees: Dina Murdie (GBR), Launel Scott (CAN)

Bronze medal match

7 September 2012; 13:30	Finland	1 – 5	Sweden	Copper Box, London; Referees: Carla Da Matta (BRA), Kimberly Anderson (USA)
7 September 2012; 13:30	Heikkinen 1	Report	Naesström 2 Gustavsson 2 Jälmestål 1	Copper Box, London; Referees: Carla Da Matta (BRA), Kimberly Anderson (USA)

== Judo ==
Athlete	Event	Quarterfinals	Semifinals	Repechage	Bronze medal	Final	
Athlete	Event	Opposition Result	Opposition Result	Opposition Result	Opposition Result	Opposition Result	Rank
Nicolina Pernheim	Women's 63 kg	Arce Payno (ESP); L 000-021	Did not advance	Soazo (VEN); L 000–110	Did not advance		

== Shooting ==
Athlete	Event	Qualification		Final		
Athlete	Event	Score	Rank	Score	Total	Rank
Jonas Jacobsson	Men's 10 m air rifle standing SH1	593	3 Q	103.5	696.5	2nd place, silver medalist(s)
Jonas Jacobsson	Men's 50 m rifle 3 positions SH1	1155	2 Q	100.9	1255.9	1st place, gold medalist(s)
Jonas Jacobsson	Mixed 10 m air rifle prone SH1	597	19	Did not advance		
Jonas Jacobsson	Mixed 50 m rifle prone SH1	591	2 Q	101.2	692.2	4
Håkan Gustafsson	Men's 10 m air rifle standing SH1	588	11	Did not advance		
Fredrik Larsson	Men's 10 m air rifle standing SH1	573	22	Did not advance		
Fredrik Larsson	Mixed 50 m rifle prone SH1	586	14	Did not advance		
Lotta Helsinger	Women's 10 m air rifle standing SH1	387	11	Did not advance		
Lotta Helsinger	Women's 50 m rifle 3 positions SH1	550	11	Did not advance		
Lotta Helsinger	Mixed 50 m rifle prone SH1	560	48	Did not advance		

== Swimming ==
Athlete	Event	Heat		Final	
Athlete	Event	Result	Rank	Result	Rank
Mikael Fredriksson	Men's 50 m backstroke S3	56.28	7 Q	55.81	6
Mikael Fredriksson	Men's 150 m individual medley SM3	3:27.11	9	Did not advance	
Christoffer Lindhe	Men's 50 m freestyle S4	41.52	8 Q	41.02	7
Christoffer Lindhe	Men's 100 m freestyle S4	1:29.11	6 Q	1:28.06	6
Christoffer Lindhe	Men's 200 m freestyle S4	3:06.60	5 Q	3:07.02	5
Christoffer Lindhe	Men's 150 m individual medley SM3	3:05.86	3 Q	3:04.12	4
Anders Olsson	Men's 50 m freestyle S6	33.88	12	Did not advance	
Anders Olsson	Men's 100 m freestyle S6	1:11.04	6 Q	1:10.12	6
Anders Olsson	Men's 400 m freestyle S6	5:06.90	2 Q	5:03.44	2nd place, silver medalist(s)
Anders Olsson	Men's 100 m breaststroke SB5	1:41.08	6 Q	1:41.59	6
Jennie Ekström	Women's 50 m backstroke S4	1:01.53	6 Q	1:00.37	6
Pernilla Lindberg	Women's 200 m freestyle S14	2:16.39 NR	5 Q	2:15.33 NR	5
Pernilla Lindberg	Women's 100 m breaststroke SB14	1:27.50	11	Did not advance	
Pernilla Lindberg	Women's 100 m backstroke S14	1:18.38	10	Did not advance	
Maja Reichard	Women's 50 m freestyle S11	33.17	=5 Q	32.66	5
Maja Reichard	Women's 100 m freestyle S11	1:16.20	7 Q	1:12.65	7
Maja Reichard	Women's 100 m breaststroke SB11	1:28.51 WR	1 Q	1:27.98 WR	1st place, gold medalist(s)
Maja Reichard	Women's 200 m individual medley SM11	3:03.72	5 Q	3:00.08	4

== Table tennis ==
Athlete	Event	Group			Round of 16	Quarterfinals	Semifinals	Final	Rank
Athlete	Event	Opposition Result	Opposition Result	Opposition Result	Opposition Result	Opposition Result	Opposition Result	Opposition Result	Rank
Emil Andersson	Men's individual C8	BYE			—N/a	Sun (CHN); W 3–2	Csejtej (SVK); L 2–3	Wilson (GBR); W 3–0	3rd place, bronze medalist(s)
Fredrik Andersson	Men's individual C10	Abdelwahab (EGY); L 2–3	Berecki (HUN); W 3–1	—N/a		Did not advance			
Linus Karlsson	Men's individual C9	Cabestany (FRA); L 2–3	Leibovitz (USA); L 1–3	—N/a		Did not advance			
Fabian Rignell	Men's individual C8	Jambor (SVK); W 3–2	Csonka (HUN); L 0-3	—N/a		Did not advance			
Alexander Öhgren	Men's individual C3	Makszin (ROU); L 2–3	Piñas (ESP); W 3–1	—N/a		Did not advance			
Emil Andersson; Fabian Rignell	Men's team C6–8	—N/a			Czech Republic (CZE); W 3–2	Germany (GER); L 1–3	Did not advance		
Fredrik Andersson; Linus Karlsson	Men's team C9–10	—N/a			France (FRA); W 3–2	Poland (POL); L 2–3	Did not advance		
Josefin Abrahamsson	Women's individual C8	Kamkasomphou (FRA); L 0–3	Mahmoud (EGY); W 3–1	Yu (CHN); W 3–2	—N/a		Mao (CHN); L 0–3	Medina (PHI); W 3–0	3rd place, bronze medalist(s)
Anna-Carin Ahlquist	Women's individual C3	BYE			—N/a	Campbell (GBR); W 3–0	Kanova (SVK); W 3–0	Mader (AUT); W 3–0	1st place, gold medalist(s)
Ingela Lundbäck	Women's individual C5	Hsiao (TPE); W 3–2	Wong (HKG); W 3–2	—N/a			Zhang (CHN); L 0–3	Abuawad (JOR); W 3–2	3rd place, bronze medalist(s)
Anna-Carin Ahlquist; Ingela Lundbäck	Women's team C4–5	—N/a			BYE	Jordan (JOR); W 3–0	South Korea (KOR); W 3–1	China (CHN); L 0–3	2nd place, silver medalist(s)

== Wheelchair rugby ==
Roster

The following is the Sweden roster in the wheelchair rugby tournament of the 2012 Summer Paralympics.

Name	Class.	Date of birth (age)	Club	Residence
Glenn Adaszak	1.0	9 January 1983 (aged 29)	Köping Hillbillies	Kungsör
Alfredo Alvarez	1.5	13 May 1982 (aged 30)	Nacka HI	Stockholm
Martin Bretz	0.5	18 January 1985 (aged 27)	Nacka HI	Solna
Andreas Collin	2.5	19 March 1986 (aged 26)	Rehab Alpin	Västra Frölunda
Tomas Hjert	2.5	22 June 1989 (aged 23)	Nacka HI	Trångsund
Stefan Jansson	1.5	6 March 1985 (aged 27)	Köping Hillbillies	Järfälla
Per-Arne Kulle	2.0	12 October 1976 (aged 35)	Malmö FIFH	Svängsta
Richard Löfgren	0.5	17 August 1971 (aged 41)	Nacka HI	Upplands Väsby
Mikael Norlin	3.5	20 February 1974 (aged 38)	Malmö FIFH	Malmö
Tobias Sandberg	3.5	28 June 1984 (aged 28)	Malmö FIFH	Lidingö
Per-Johan Uhlman	3.5	2 October 1974 (aged 37)	Malmö FIFH	Malmö
Mikael Wahlberg	0.5	18 February 1980 (aged 32)	Köping Hillbillies	Solna

Group stage

Team	Pld	W	D	L	GF	GA	GD	Pts	Qualification
Australia (AUS)	3	3	0	0	182	142	+40	6	Semifinals
Canada (CAN)	3	2	0	1	163	166	−3	4	Semifinals
Sweden (SWE)	3	1	0	2	151	155	−4	2	Eliminated
Belgium (BEL)	3	0	0	3	135	168	−33	0	Eliminated

5 September 2012
16:15

Sweden	52 – 42	Belgium
Uhlmann 15; Hjert 9 Jansson 7 Sandberg 6 Kulle 5 Norlin 4 Team 4 Collin 2	Report	Mertens 20; Verhaegen 9 Genyn 6 Vanacker 3 Team 2 Budeners 1 Meersschaut 1

Basketball Arena
Attendance: 4,404
Referee: Motoko Izumiya (JPN), Philip Washbourn (NZL)

6 September 2012
14:00

Sweden	47 – 60	Australia
Uhlmann 9 Norlin 8 Kulle 7 Hjelt 7 Collin 6 Team 4 Sandberg 3 Jansson 2 Wahlberg 1	Report	Batt 30; Bond 14; Team 4 Carr 3 Newton 2 Smith 2 Harrison 2 Hose 1 Lees 1 Meakin 1

Basketball Arena
Attendance: 5,622
Referee: Pierre-Alexandre Brière (CAN), Alexander Schreiner (GER)

7 September 2012
12:15

Canada	53 – 52	Sweden
	Report

Basketball Arena
Attendance: 5,469
Referee: Darren Roberts (USA), Alexander Schreiner (GER)

5th–8th place semi-final

8 September 2012
14:00

Sweden	58 – 48	France
	Report

Basketball Arena
Attendance: 2,994
Referee: Motoko Izumiya (JPN), Dave Woods (GBR)

Classification 5-6

8 September 2012
21:15

Great Britain	59 – 47	Sweden
	Report

Basketball Arena
Attendance: 2,484
Referee: Mitch Carr (USA), Alexander Schreiner (GER)

== Wheelchair tennis ==
Athlete	Event	Round of 64	Round of 32	Round of 16	Quarterfinals	Semifinals	Final	
Athlete	Event	Opposition Result	Opposition Result	Opposition Result	Opposition Result	Opposition Result	Opposition Result	Rank
Stefan Olsson	Men's singles	Denayer (BEL); W 6–0, 6–0	Lee (KOR); W 6–1, 6–2	Reid (GBR); L 5–7, 4–6	Did not advance			
Peter Vikström	Men's singles	Kellerman (AUS); L 4–6, 3–6	Did not advance					
Stefan Olsson; Peter Vikström	Men's doubles	—N/a	Baldwin / Yablong (USA); W 6–0, 6–1	Arzola / Blanch (ESP); W 6–1, 6–0	Egberink / Scheffers (NED); W 6–3, 6–2	Houdet / Jérémiasz (FRA); W 6–1, 7–6	Cattanéo / Peifer (FRA); W 6–1, 6–2	1st place, gold medalist(s)
Anders Hård	Quad singles	—N/a		Lapthorne (GBR); W 5–7, 6–3, 6–3	Taylor (USA); L 6–4, 4–6, 1–6	Did not advance		
Marcus Jonsson	Quad singles	—N/a		Weinberg (ISR); L 1–6, 2–6	Did not advance			
Anders Hård; Marcus Jonsson	Quad doubles	—N/a			Gershony / Weinberg (ISR); L 1–6, 4–6	Did not advance		

== Notes ==
- Official site

== See also ==
- Sweden at the 2012 Summer Olympics
