= Claudio Massad =

Brazilian table tennis player (born 1985)

Personal information
- Full name: Claudio Massad de Moura
- Nationality: Brazilian
- Born: 27 February 1985 (age 41) Bauru, São Paulo

Sport
- Country: Brazil
- Sport: Table tennis
- Event: C10, MD18 doubles
- Club: SESI Bauru
Medal record
Men's para table tennis
Representing Brazil
Summer Paralympics
Bronze medal – third place	2024 Paris	Men's doubles MD18
Parapan American Games
Gold medal – first place	2023 Santiago	Men's C10
Gold medal – first place	2019 Lima	Men's C9–C10 team
Silver medal – second place	2015 Toronto	Men's C10
Silver medal – second place	2019 Lima	Men's C10
Bronze medal – third place	2023 Santiago	Men's doubles MD18

Claudio Massad (born 27 February 1985) is a Brazilian table tennis player.

== Career ==
Victim of Blount's disease, Massad had malformations in his legs. As a child, he started playing table tennis, later becoming a para-athlete. He has represented Brazil since 2015, at the 2015 Parapan American Games in Toronto.

A debutant in the Paralympics games at the age of 39, he won the bronze medal alongside Luiz Manara in the MD18 men's doubles.
