= Peng Weinan =

Chinese para table tennis player

Personal information
- Born: 10 April 2002 (age 24) Zhejiang, China

Sport
- Sport: Table tennis
Medal record
Men's para table tennis
Representing China
Paralympic Games
Gold medal – first place	2020 Tokyo	Team C8
Silver medal – second place	2024 Paris	Doubles XD17
Bronze medal – third place	2020 Tokyo	Singles C8
Asian Para Games
Silver medal – second place	2022 Hangzhou	Singles C8
Bronze medal – third place	2022 Hangzhou	Doubles C14

Peng Weinan (born 10 April 2002) is a Chinese para table tennis player. He won one of the bronze medals in the men's individual C8 event at the 2020 Summer Paralympics held in Tokyo, Japan. He also won the gold medal in the men's team C8 event.
