= Zhao Yiqing =

Chinese para table tennis player

Personal information
- Native name: 赵裔卿
- Born: 25 January 1993 (age 33) Jinan, China

Sport
- Sport: Table tennis
Medal record
Para table tennis
Representing China
Paralympic Games
Gold medal – first place	2020 Tokyo	Teams C9-10
Silver medal – second place	2024 Paris	Doubles MD18
World Championships
Silver medal – second place	2014 Beijing	Teams C9-10
Bronze medal – third place	2014 Beijing	Singles C9
Asian Para Games
Gold medal – first place	2014 Incheon	Teams C9-10
Gold medal – first place	2018 Jakarta	Singles C9
Silver medal – second place	2010 Guangzhou	Singles C9
Silver medal – second place	2014 Incheon	Singles C9

Zhao Yiqing (Chinese: 赵裔卿; born 25 January 1993) is a Chinese para table tennis player. He competed at the 2024 Summer Paralympics, where he reached the gold medal match of the men's doubles MD18 tournament with Liu Chaodong.
