= Liu Chaodong =

Chinese para table tennis player

Personal information
- Native name: 刘朝栋
- Born: 23 January 2000 (age 26) Kunming, China

Sport
- Sport: Table tennis
Medal record
Para table tennis
Representing China
Paralympic Games
Silver medal – second place	2024 Paris	Men's doubles MD18
Asian Para Games
Bronze medal – third place	2022 Hangzhou	Singles C9

Liu Chaodong (Chinese: 刘朝栋; born 23 January 2000) is a Chinese para table tennis player. He competed at the 2024 Summer Paralympics, where he reached the gold medal match of the men's doubles MD18 tournament with Zhao Yiqing.
