= Grégory Rosec =

French para table tennis player

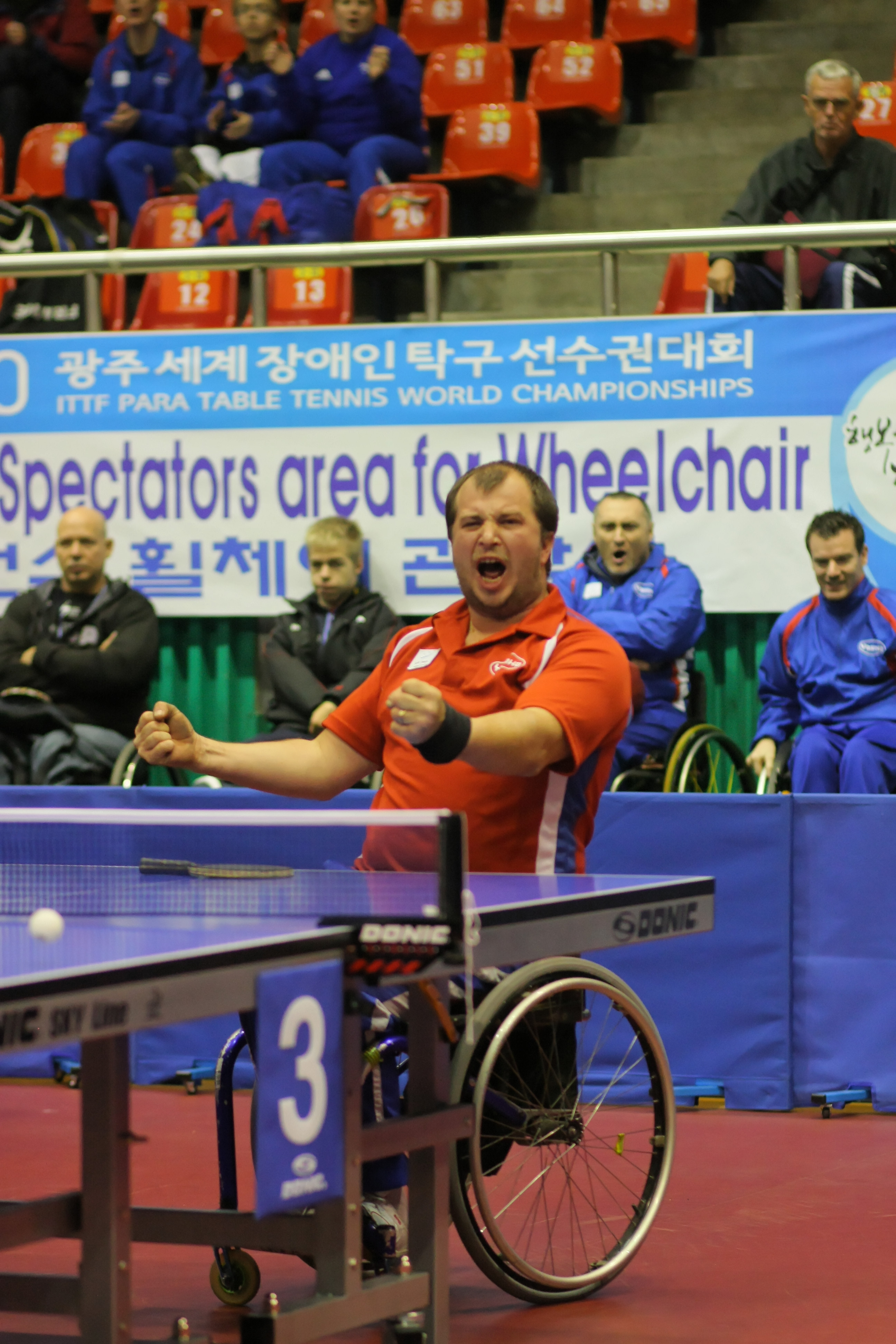
- Rosec at 2010 World Para Table Tennis Championships

Personal information
- Born: 18 March 1977 (age 49) Le Havre, France

Sport
- Country: France
- Sport: Para table tennis
- Disability class: C5
- Retired: 2015
Medal record
Para table tennis
Representing France
Paralympic Games
Bronze medal – third place	2004 Athens	Men's teams C5
Bronze medal – third place	2012 London	Men's teams C4-5
European Championships
Gold medal – first place	2007 Kranjska Gora	Men's teams C5
Gold medal – first place	2013 Lignano	Men's teams C5
Silver medal – second place	2005 Jesolo	Men's teams C5
Bronze medal – third place	2005 Jesolo	Men's singles C5
Bronze medal – third place	2011 Split	Men's teams C5

Grégory Rosec (born 18 March 1977) is a retired French para table tennis player who competed in international elite events. He is a double Paralympic bronze medalist and a double European champion in team events. After retirement, he became the head coach of the French para table tennis team.
