= Luiz Manara =

Brazilian table tennis player (born 1991)

Personal information
- Full name: Luiz Filipe Guarnieri Manara
- Nationality: Brazilian
- Born: 19 November 1991 (age 34) Mogi Mirim, São Paulo

Sport
- Country: Brazil
- Sport: Table tennis
- Event: C8, MD18 doubles
Medal record
Men's para table tennis
Representing Brazil
Summer Paralympics
Bronze medal – third place	2024 Paris	Men's doubles MD18
Parapan American Games
Gold medal – first place	2015 Toronto	Men's C8 single
Gold medal – first place	2019 Lima	Men's C8 single
Gold medal – first place	2023 Santiago	Men's C8 single
Gold medal – first place	2015 Toronto	Men's C6–C8 team
Gold medal – first place	2019 Lima	Men's C6–C8 team
Bronze medal – third place	2023 Santiago	Men's doubles MD18

Luiz Filipe Guarnieri Manara (born 19 November 1991) is a Brazilian table tennis player.

== Career ==
Having suffered from a lack of oxygenation during childbirth, Manara had cerebral palsy. As a form of therapeutic rehabilitation, table tennis also found a way to play sport competitively. He was three-time Parapanemerican champion in class C8, and in 2024 he won the bronze medal alongside Claudio Massad in the MD18 men's doubles at the 2024 Summer Paralympics.
