= Viktor Didukh =

Ukrainian Paralympic table tennis player

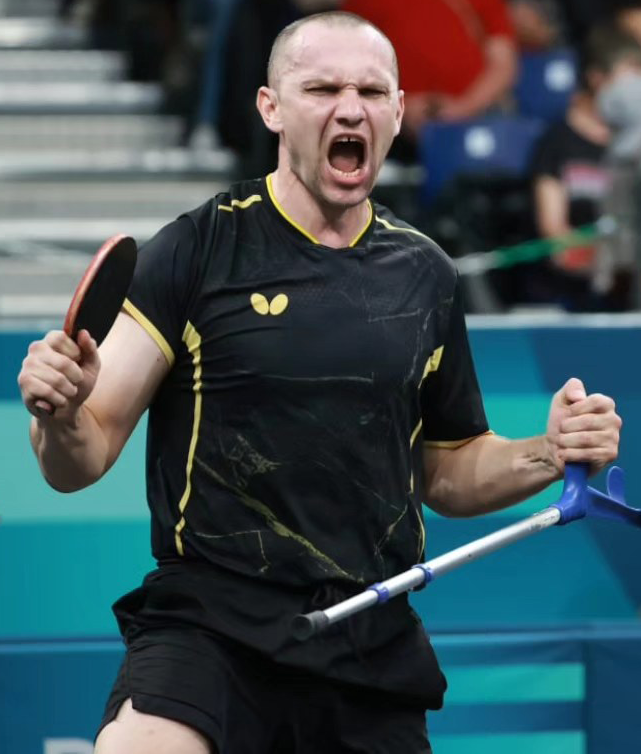
- Didukh at the 2024 Summer Paralympics

Personal information
- Born: 23 January 1987 (age 39) Lviv, Ukrainian SSR, Soviet Union

Sport
- Country: Ukraine
- Sport: Para table tennis
- Disability class: C8
Medal record
Para table tennis
Representing Ukraine
Paralympic Games
Gold medal – first place	2016 Rio de Janeiro	Men's team C6-8
Gold medal – first place	2024 Paris	Singles C8
Silver medal – second place	2020 Tokyo	men's C8
Silver medal – second place	2020 Tokyo	Men's team C8
Bronze medal – third place	2024 Paris	Mixed doubles XD17

Viktor Ihorovych Didukh (Ukrainian: Віктор Ігорович Дідух; born 23 January 1987) is a Ukrainian para table tennis player competing at singles (class 8) and team events (class 6–8).

== Career ==
Along with Maksym Nikolenko, he won a gold medal at the 2016 Summer Paralympics in Rio de Janeiro, defeating the Swedish team of Linus Karlsson and Emil Andersson at the men's team class 6-8 finals. Didukh also won a silver medal at the 2020 Summer Paralympics, having lost to Zhao Shuai in the men's class 8 final and won a gold medal at the 2024 games beating Zhao Shai in the class 8 final.
