= Will Bayley =

British para table tennis player

Will Bayley MBE
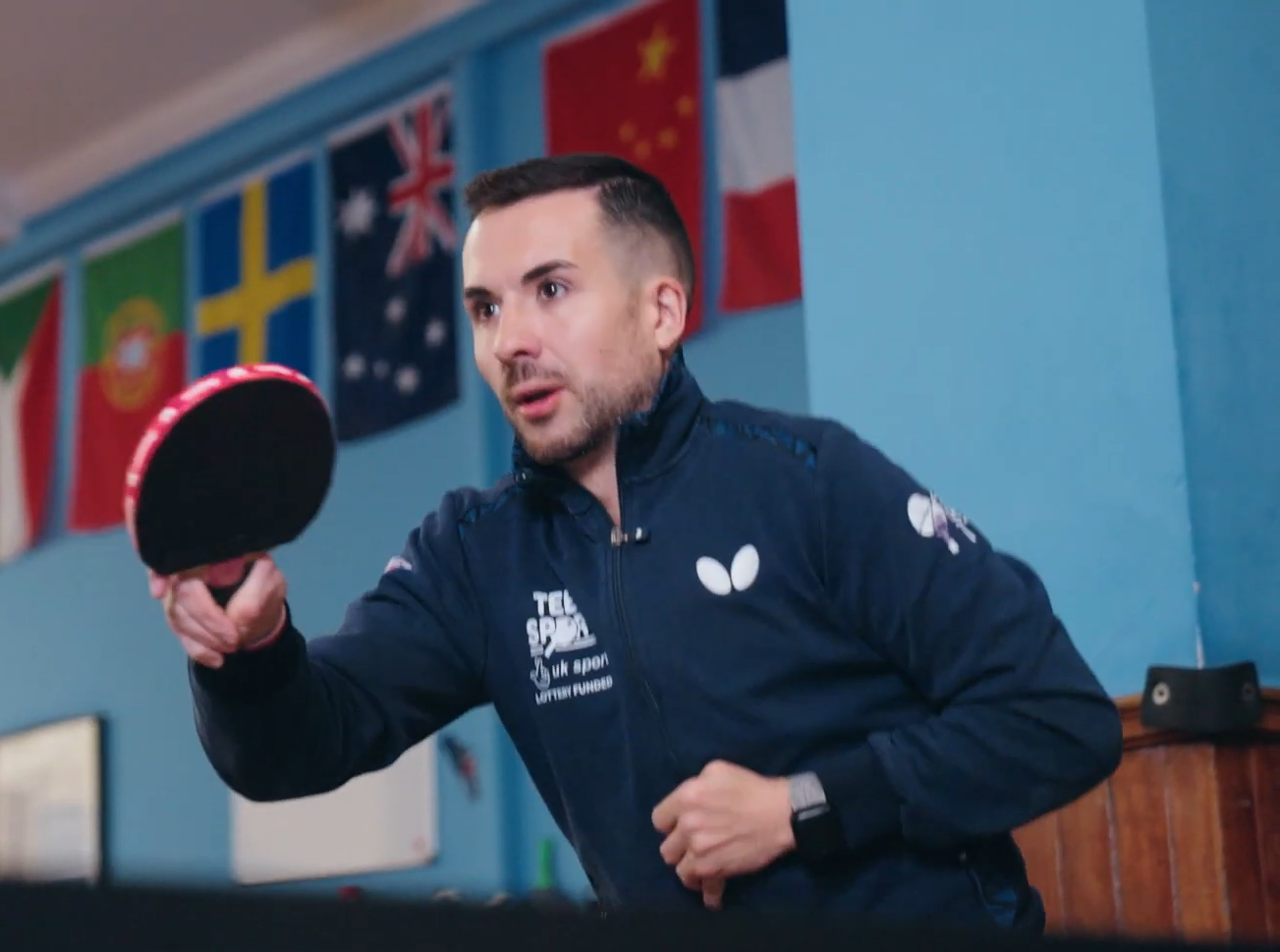
- Bayley in 2023

Personal information
- Full name: William John Bayley
- Born: 17 January 1988 (age 38) Royal Tunbridge Wells, Kent, England

Sport
- Sport: Table tennis
Medal record
Men's para table tennis
Representing Great Britain
Paralympic Games
Gold medal – first place	2016 Rio	Individual – Class 7
Silver medal – second place	2012 London	Individual – Class 7
Silver medal – second place	2020 Tokyo	Individual – Class 7
Silver medal – second place	2020 Tokyo	Team – Class 6-7
Silver medal – second place	2024 Paris	Singles C7

William John Bayley (born 17 January 1988) is a British professional Paralympic table tennis player, ranked world number 1. He is the 2016 Summer Paralympics Games gold medallist and the 2014 World Champion.

From September 2019 Bayley participated in the seventeenth series of Strictly Come Dancing, paired with professional dancer Janette Manrara.

== Personal life ==
Bayley was born on 17 January 1988 in Royal Tunbridge Wells, Kent, England. He was born with arthrogryposis which affects all four of his limbs.

At the age of seven he was diagnosed with cancer. During his recovery he began playing table tennis after his grandmother bought him his first table.

== Career ==
At the age of 12 he joined the Byng Hall Table Tennis Club in Tunbridge Wells, and went on to represent Kent's able bodied men's team. From the age of 17 he has lived and trained full-time at the English Institute of Sport in Sheffield.

He represented Great Britain at the 2008 Summer Paralympics in Beijing, China, where he was knocked out of the table tennis C7 singles in the preliminary round after defeats against Germany's Jochen Wollmert and Ukraine's Mykhaylo Popov and a single victory against Shumel Shur of Israel. He also competed in the C6-8 team event along with Paul Karabardak and David Wetherill; they were eliminated at the quarterfinal stage. In 2009, he won gold medals at the Czech and German opens, in 2010 he took golds in Lignano and Brazil.

Bayley won a gold medal in the singles at the 2011 European Championships in Split, Croatia. He also won a silver medal in the men's Team event class 7, playing alongside Karabardak. At the end of 2011 he was voted the European Players' Player of the Year and in January 2012 he achieved the world number one ranking.

Bayley won a silver medal in the London 2012 Summer Paralympics after losing to Germany's Jochen Wollmert in the class 7 final.

At the Rio 2016 Summer Paralympics, Bayley won his first Paralympic gold medal after beating home-favourite Brazilian Israel Pereira Stroh. He received a yellow card for jumping up onto the table in celebration.

Bayley again won silver at the delayed Tokyo 2020 games, his third successive Paralympic medal. He went on to win silver in the team event, where he had a rematch in the final against Yan Shuo, who he lost his olympic title to a week earlier.

Bayley was appointed Member of the Order of the British Empire (MBE) in the 2017 New Year Honours for services to table tennis.

== Strictly Come Dancing ==
From September 2019 Bayley participated in the seventeenth series of Strictly Come Dancing, paired with professional dancer Janette Manrara.

The couple's Contemporary dance, to Lukas Graham's song "7 Years", was dedicated to the patients and staff at Great Ormond Street Hospital, where Bayley had been treated for cancer, aged seven. Michael Hogan of The Daily Telegraph said the pair "... didn't leave a dry eye in the house after their beautiful, barefoot contemporary dance."

Due to a knee injury, sustained from a studio rehearsal, Bayley was unable to perform in week 6 (Halloween Week). Under the rules of the competition, he was given a "bye" to the following week, however, it was later confirmed that he had withdrawn from the competition. He said, "I'm gutted my Strictly journey has had to come to an end. I've loved being part of the show."

Week No.	Dance/song	Judges' score				Total	Result
Week No.	Dance/song	Horwood	Mabuse	Ballas	Tonioli	Total	Result
1	Quickstep / "Pencil Full of Lead"	5	7	7	7	26	No elimination
2	Salsa / "1-2-3"	6	6	6	6	24	Safe
3	Paso Doble / "Gotta Catch 'Em All"	6	6	5	6	23	Safe
4	Foxtrot / "Señorita"	6	6	6	6	24	Safe
5	Contemporary / "7 Years"	7	8	8	9	32^{A}	Safe
6	Jive / "Casper The Friendly Ghost"	—	—	—	—	—	Given bye
7	Waltz / "Weekend in New England"	—	—	—	—	—	Withdrew

^A Alfonso Ribeiro filled in for Tonioli
