= Piotr Grudzień =

Polish para table tennis player

Personal information
- Born: 27 September 1991 (age 34) Wolomin, Poland
- Height: 182 cm (6 ft 0 in)

Sport
- Country: Poland
- Sport: Para table tennis
- Disability class: C8
- Coached by: Lucjan Blaszczyk
Medal record
Para table tennis
Representing Poland
Paralympic Games
Gold medal – first place	2012 London	Men's teams C6-8
Gold medal – first place	2024 Paris	Men's doubles MD18
Silver medal – second place	2008 Beijing	Men's singles C8
Bronze medal – third place	2016 Rio de Janeiro	Men's singles C8
Bronze medal – third place	2016 Rio de Janeiro	Men's teams C9-10
Bronze medal – third place	2024 Paris	Mixed doubles XD17
World Championships
Gold medal – first place	2010 Gwangju	Men's teams C8
Silver medal – second place	2014 Beijing	Men's teams C8
Bronze medal – third place	2010 Gwangju	Men's singles C8
World Team Championships
Bronze medal – third place	2017 Bratislava	Men's teams C8
European Championships
Gold medal – first place	2009 Genoa	Men's teams C8
Silver medal – second place	2007 Kranjska Gora	Men's teams C8
Bronze medal – third place	2013 Lignano	Men's teams C8
Bronze medal – third place	2017 Lasko	Men's teams C8
Bronze medal – third place	2019 Helsingborg	Men's singles C8
Bronze medal – third place	2019 Helsingborg	Men's teams C8

Piotr Grudzień (born 27 September 1991) is a Polish para table tennis player who competes in international level events. He is a Paralympic and World champion and a multiple European medalist in team events. He has won medals alongside Patryk Chojnowski and his training partner Marcin Skrzynecki.
