= Davide Scazzieri =

Italian para table tennis player

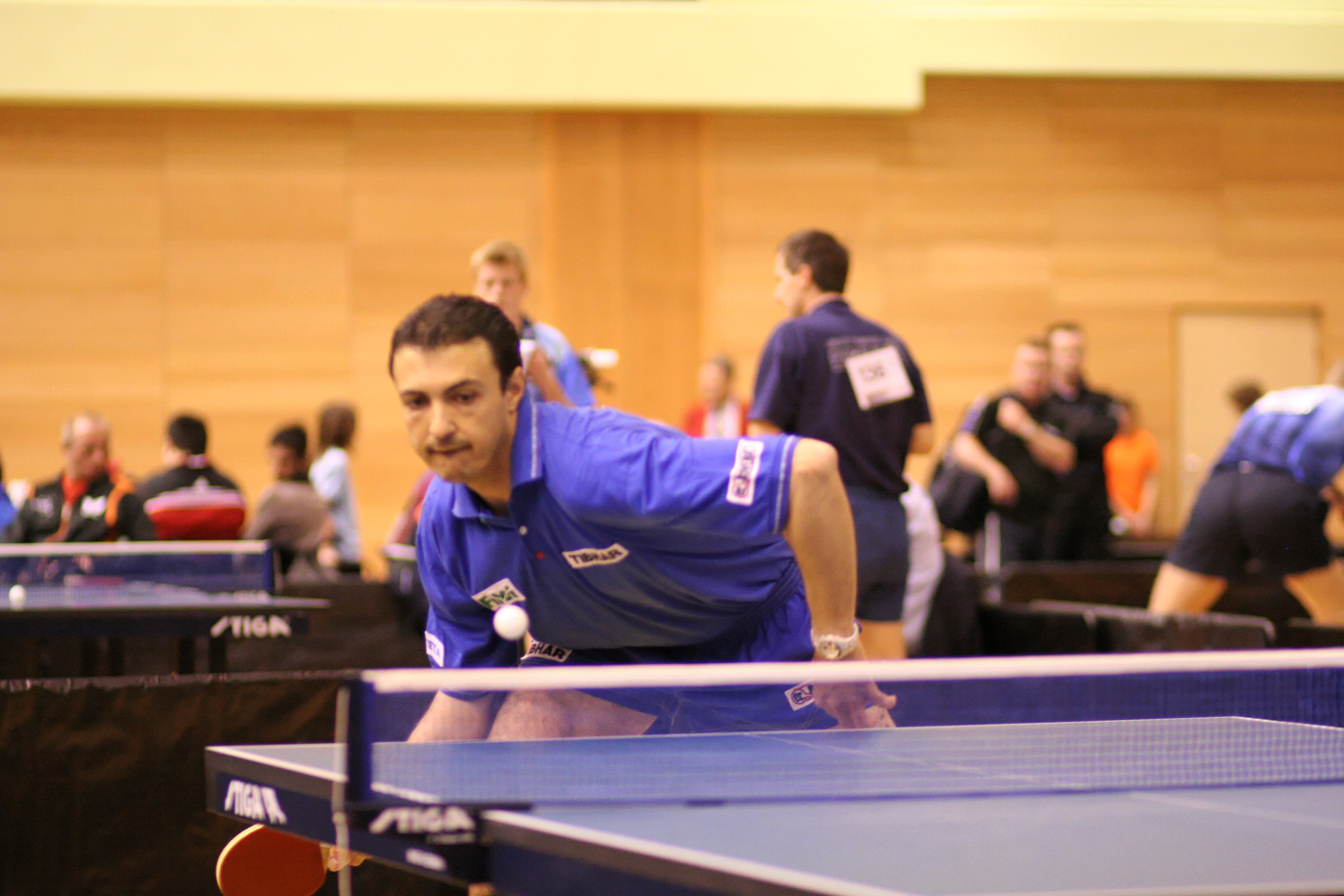
- Scazzieri at 2007 European Para Table Tennis Championships in Kranjska Gora

Personal information
- Nationality: Italian
- Born: August 8, 1972 (age 53) Bologna, Italy

Sport
- Country: Italy
- Sport: Para table tennis
- Club: L'Isola Che Non C'era Onlus
- Coached by: Alessandro Arcigli
Medal record
IWAS World Games
Gold medal – first place	2007 Taipei	Men's singles C6-7
European Championships
Gold medal – first place	2005 Gesolo	Men's team C7

Davide Scazzieri (born 8 August 1972 in Bologna) is an Italian para table tennis player who now competes in sports category 4.

He is disabled due to an accident.

== See also ==
- Italy at the 2012 Summer Paralympics
