= Jochen Wollmert =

German Paralympic table tennis player

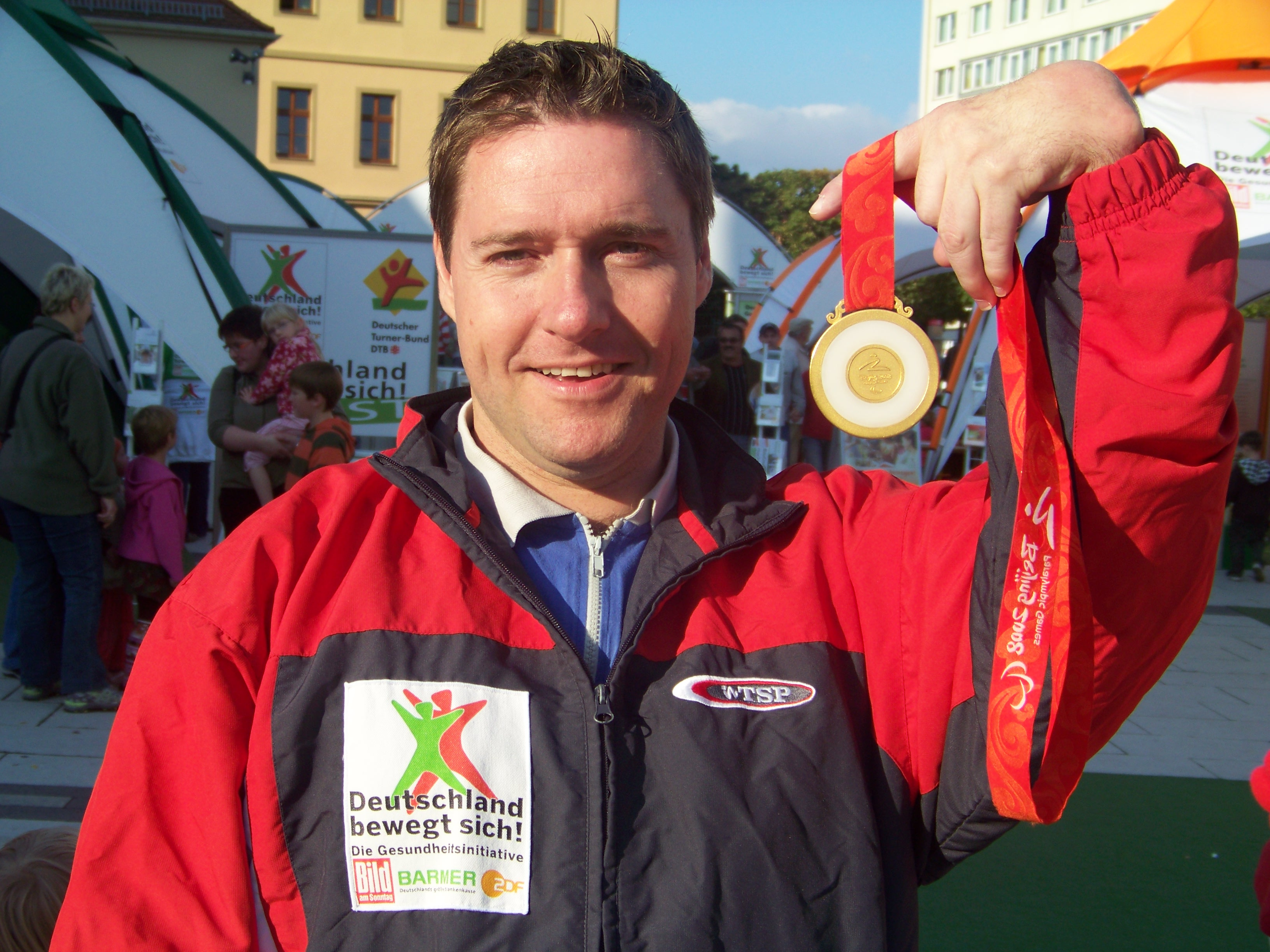

Personal information
- Nationality: German
- Born: 22 November 1964 (age 61) Wuppertal, West Germany
- Height: 180 cm (5 ft 11 in)

Sport
- Country: Germany
- Sport: Para table tennis
- Disability: Congenital disease
- Disability class: C7
- Club: Borussia Düsseldorf
- Coached by: Volker Ziegler
Medal record
Para table tennis
Representing Germany
Paralympic Games
Bronze medal – third place	1992 Barcelona	Men's singles C7
Bronze medal – third place	1992 Barcelona	Men's teams C8
Silver medal – second place	1996 Atlanta	Men's singles C7
Gold medal – first place	1996 Atlanta	Men's team C6-8
Gold medal – first place	2000 Sydney	Men's singles C7
Bronze medal – third place	2000 Sydney	Men's team C8
Silver medal – second place	2004 Athens	Men's singles C7
Gold medal – first place	2004 Athens	Men's team C6-7
Gold medal – first place	2008 Beijing	Men's singles C7
Gold medal – first place	2012 London	Men's singles C7
World Championships
Gold medal – first place	1990 Assen	Men's singles C7
Gold medal – first place	1990 Assen	Men's teams C6-7
Gold medal – first place	1998 Paris	Men's singles C7
Silver medal – second place	1998 Paris	Men's team C8
Gold medal – first place	2002 Taipei	Men's teams C6-7
Bronze medal – third place	2002 Taipei	Men's singles C7
Gold medal – first place	2006 Montreux	Men's singles C7
Gold medal – first place	2006 Montreux	Men's teams C6-7
European Championships
Gold medal – first place	1991 Salou	Men's teams C8
Bronze medal – third place	1991 Salou	Men's singles C7
Gold medal – first place	1995 Hillerød	Men's singles C7
Gold medal – first place	1995 Hillerød	Men's teams C8
Gold medal – first place	1997 Stockholm	Men's singles C7
Gold medal – first place	1997 Stockholm	Men's teams C7-8
Gold medal – first place	1999 Piešťany	Men's singles C7
Gold medal – first place	2001 Frankfurt	Men's singles C7
Silver medal – second place	2001 Frankfurt	Men's teams C8
Gold medal – first place	2005 Jesolo	Men's singles C7
Silver medal – second place	2005 Jesolo	Men's teams C7
Silver medal – second place	2007 Kranjska Gora	Men's teams C7
Bronze medal – third place	2007 Kranjska Gora	Men's singles C7
Silver medal – second place	2009 Genoa	Men's singles C7
Bronze medal – third place	2013 Lignano	Men's teams C7
Bronze medal – third place	2015 Vejle	Men's teams C7

Jochen Wollmert (born 22 November 1964) is a German Paralympic table tennis player.

He won his first individual Paralympic medal, a bronze, at the 1992 Summer Paralympics. Since then he has won individual gold at the 2000 and 2008 Summer Paralympics, along with other Paralympic medals and team golds. He won his third gold medal at the age of 47 at the 2012 Summer Paralympics.
