= African Para Table Tennis Championships =

African Para Table Tennis Championships are a biennial sport event for para table tennis players who represent an African country. It was originally called the Africa/Middle East Championships from 1999 to 2005. Players from the Middle East now compete in Asian Para Table Tennis Championships since 2005.

== Locations ==
Edition	Year	Host	Dates	Competitors	Countries	Top medalists	Ref
African/Middle East Para Table Tennis Championships
1	1999	(South Africa) Johannesburg	25 November - 2 December	51	6	Nigeria	
2	2003	(Jordan) Amman	4–11 December	61	7	Jordan	
3	2005	(Egypt) Cairo	2–11 December	65	7	Egypt	
African Para Table Tennis Championships
1	2007	(Egypt) Cairo	10–17 December	48	6	Egypt	
2	2009	(South Africa) Johannesburg	2–4 December	32	5	Egypt	
3	2011	(Egypt) Ismailia	4–11 November	77	5	Nigeria	
4	2013	(Egypt) Sharm el Sheikh	14–20 December	40	5	Egypt	
5	2015	(Morocco) Agadir	7–11 October	40	6	Egypt	
6	2019	(Egypt) Alexandria	30 June – 2 July	72	8	Egypt	
7	2023	(Egypt) Giza	20–23 September	112	9	Nigeria	
8	2025	(Egypt) Giza	20–23 November	52	5	Nigeria	

== All-time medal count ==
As of 2025.

Rank	Nation	Gold	Silver	Bronze	Total
1	Egypt (EGY)	57	73	71	201
2	Nigeria (NGR)	49	30	18	97
3	South Africa (RSA)	5	14	20	39
4	Libya (LBA)	1	3	4	8
5	Tunisia (TUN)	1	0	0	1
6	Ivory Coast (CIV)	0	2	1	3
7	Algeria (ALG)	0	1	5	6
8	Morocco (MAR)	0	0	4	4
9	Sierra Leone (SLE)	0	0	2	2
10	Cameroon (CMR)	0	0	1	1
10	Lesotho (LES)	0	0	1	1
Totals (11 entries)		113	123	127	363

== See also ==
- World Para Table Tennis Championships
- African Table Tennis Championships
