= Álvaro Valera =

Spanish para table tennis player

Alvaro Valera
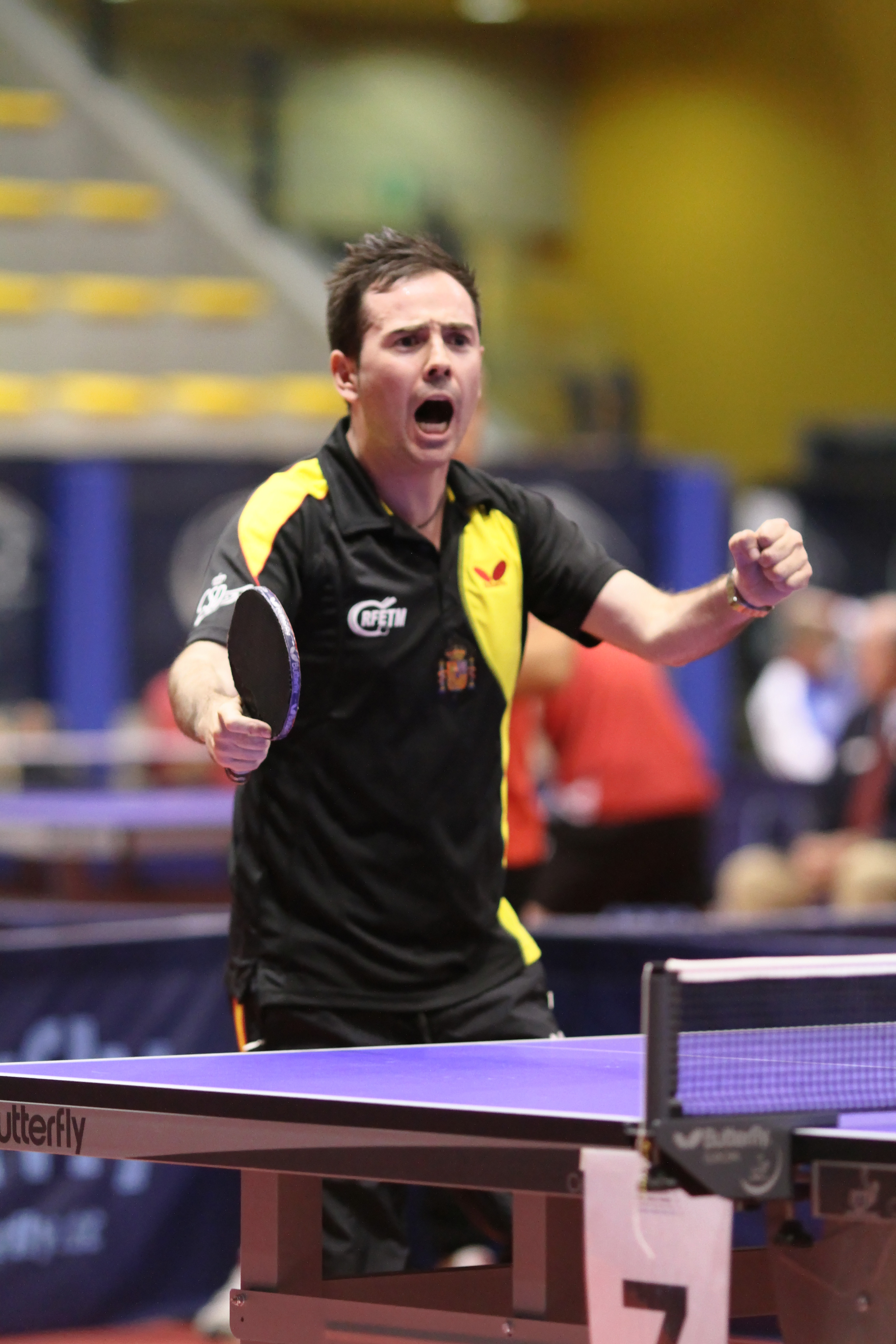

Personal information
- Full name: Alvaro Valera Muñoz-Vargas
- Nationality: Spanish
- Born: 16 October 1982 (age 43) Seville

Sport
- Country: Spain
- Sport: Table tennis (class 7)
Medal record
Para table tennis
Representing Spain
Paralympic Games
Gold medal – first place	2000 Sydney	Class 8 singles
Silver medal – second place	2016 Río	Class 6 singles
Silver medal – second place	2012 London	Class 6 singles
Silver medal – second place	2012 London	Team class 6–8
Bronze medal – third place	2008 Beijing	Class 7 singles
Bronze medal – third place	2020 Tokyo	Team class 6–7

Alvaro Valera Muñoz-Vargas (Note: In this Spanish name, the first or paternal surname is Valera and the second or maternal family name is Muñoz-Vargas.) (born 16 October 1986 in Seville) table tennis player from Spain.

== Personal ==
In 2012, he lived in Madrid. In 2013, he was awarded the silver Real Orden al Mérito Deportivo.

== Table tennis ==
He played table tennis at the 2000, 2004, 2008 and 2012 Summer Paralympics. He won a gold medal in Sydney in 2000, the only gold medal in table tennis in Spanish Paralympic history. In 2008, he finished third in the Class 7 men's singles.

In London 2012, he finished second in the Class 6 men's singles and in the team class 6–8 event.
