= Zhao Shuai (table tennis) =

Chinese para table tennis player

Personal information
- Born: November 28, 1994 (age 31) Yu County, Hebei, China
- Height: 175 cm (5 ft 9 in)

Sport
- Sport: Table tennis
- Playing style: Right-handed shakehand grip
- Disability class: 8
- Highest ranking: 1 (July 2012)
- Current ranking: 2 (February 2020)
Medal record
Men's para table tennis
Representing China
Paralympic Games
Gold medal – first place	2012 London	Singles C8
Gold medal – first place	2016 Rio de Janeiro	Singles C8
Gold medal – first place	2020 Tokyo	Singles C8
Gold medal – first place	2020 Tokyo	Teams C8
Gold medal – first place	2024 Paris	Mixed doubles XD17
Silver medal – second place	2024 Paris	Singles C8
Bronze medal – third place	2024 Paris	Doubles MD18
World Championships
Gold medal – first place	2014 Beijing	Teams C8
Silver medal – second place	2018 Laško	Singles C8
Bronze medal – third place	2014 Beijing	Singles C8
Asian Para Games
Gold medal – first place	2014 Incheon	Singles C8
Gold medal – first place	2014 Incheon	Teams C8
Gold medal – first place	2018 Jakarta	Singles C8
Gold medal – first place	2018 Jakarta	Teams C8
Gold medal – first place	2022 Hangzhou	Singles C8
Asian Championships
Gold medal – first place	2011 Hong Kong	Teams C8
Gold medal – first place	2013 Beijing	Teams C8
Gold medal – first place	2015 Amman	Teams C8
Gold medal – first place	2017 Beijing	Singles C8
Gold medal – first place	2017 Beijing	Teams C8
Gold medal – first place	2019 Taichung	Teams C8
Silver medal – second place	2015 Amman	Singles C8
Silver medal – second place	2019 Taichung	Singles C8
Bronze medal – third place	2013 Beijing	Singles C8

Zhao Shuai
- Traditional Chinese: 趙帥
- Simplified Chinese: 赵帅
Transcriptions
Standard Mandarin
- Hanyu Pinyin: Zhào Shuài

Zhao Shuai (Chinese: 赵帅, born 28 November 1994) is a Chinese para table tennis player. He won the C8 singles at the 2012 Summer Paralympics, and defended his title four years later at the 2016 Summer Paralympics. At the 2020 Summer Paralympics he won two gold medals.

== Personal life ==
Zhao's left arm was amputated when he was four years old, following a car accident.
