= Emil Andersson (table tennis) =

Swedish Paralympic table tennis player

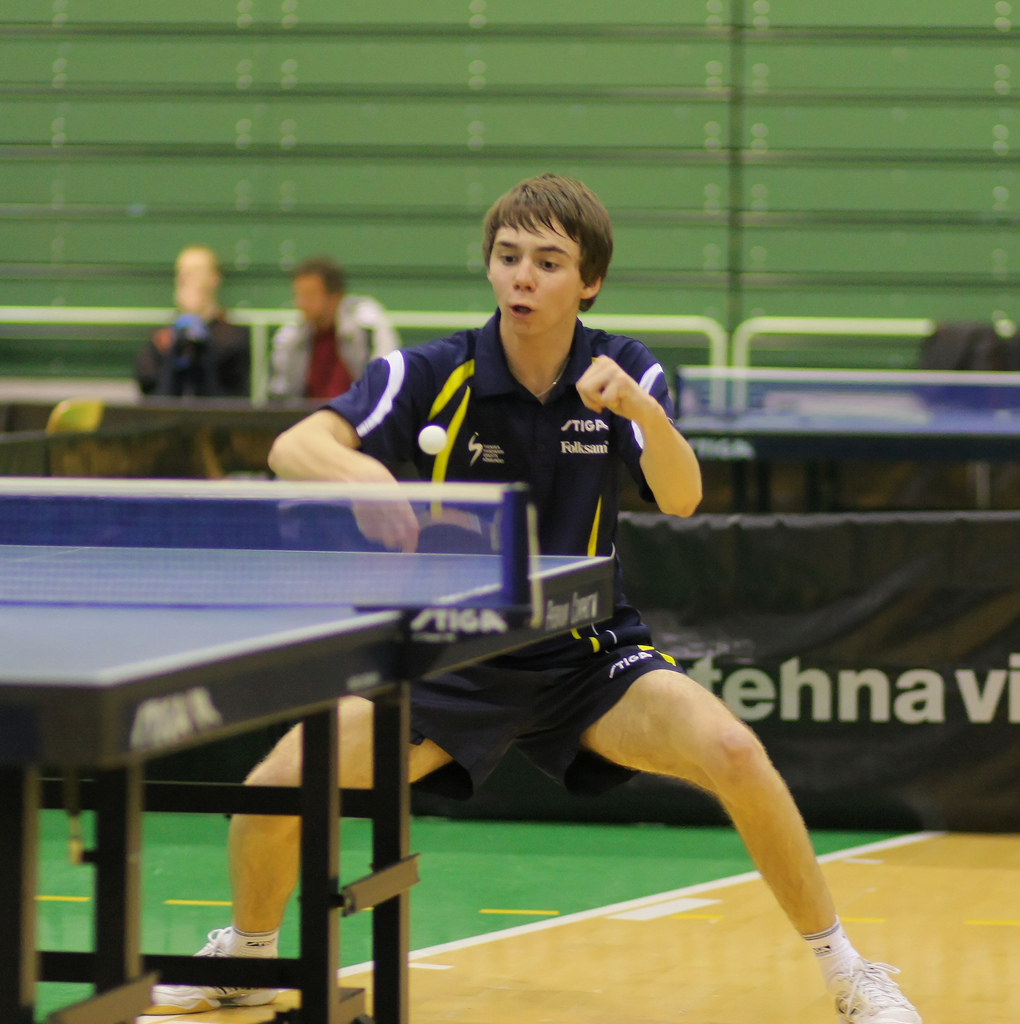
- Emil Andersson

Personal information
- Born: 29 April 1993 (age 33) Arboga, Sweden
- Home town: Örebro, Sweden

Sport
- Country: Sweden
- Sport: Para table tennis
- Disability class: Class 8
Medal record
Men's para table tennis
Representing Sweden
Paralympic Games
Silver medal – second place	2016 Rio de Janeiro	Team C6-8
Bronze medal – third place	2012 London	Singles C8

Emil Andersson (born 29 April 1993) is a Swedish male table tennis parasportist competing at singles (class 8) and team events (class 6-8).

Andersson participated at the 2012 Summer Paralympics in London, where he won a bronze medal at the men's singles class 8. Andersson and Linus Karlsson won a silver medal at the 2016 Summer Paralympics in Rio de Janeiro, playing against the Ukrainian team at the men's team class 6-8 finals.

At the 2024 Summer Paralympics in Paris, Andersson finished 5th in the men's singles MS8 event and 5th in the men's doubles MD18 event.
