= Maksym Nikolenko =

Ukrainian para table tennis player

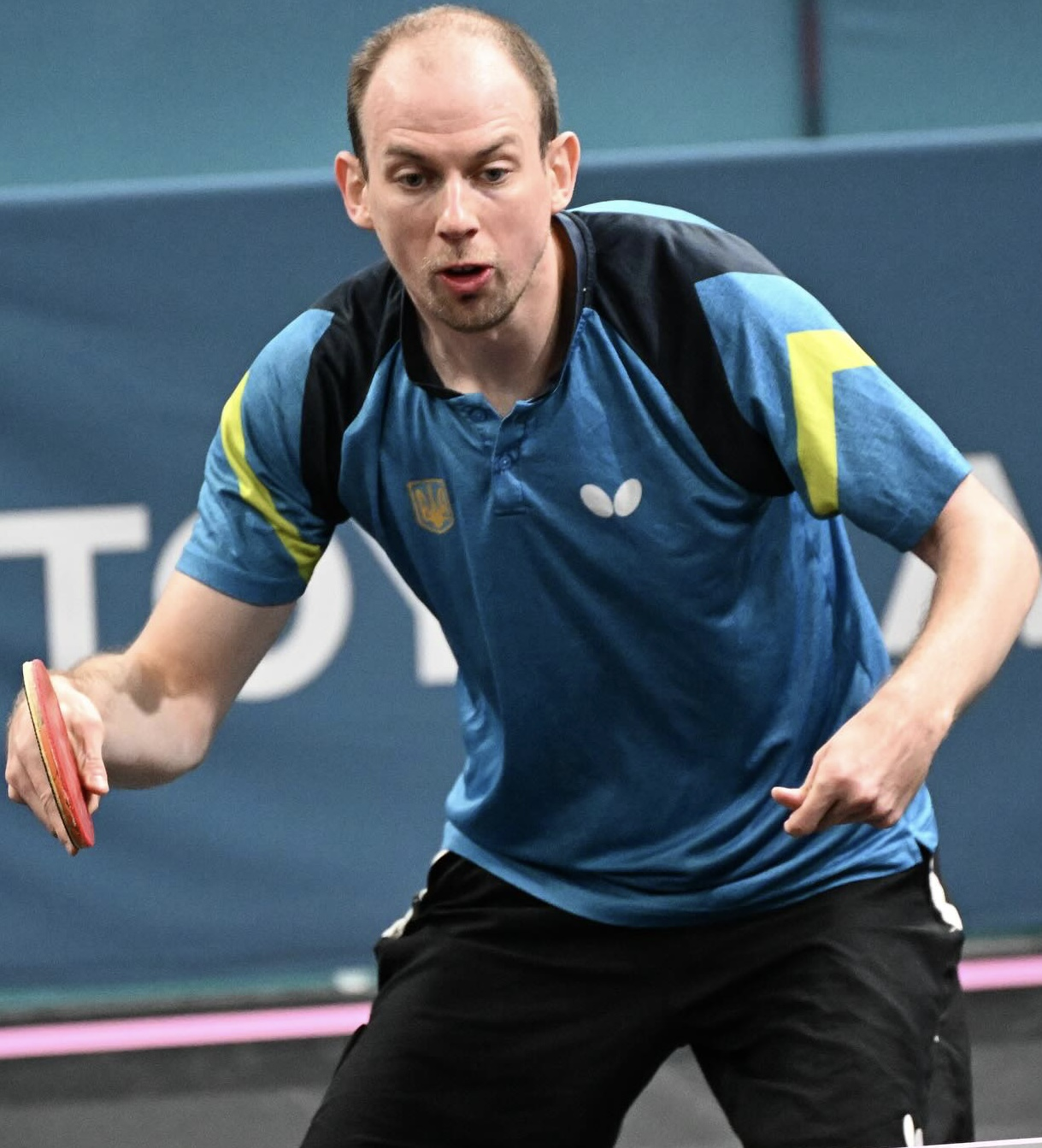
- Nikolenko at the 2024 Summer Paralympics

Personal information
- Born: 14 August 1993 (age 32) Zaporizhzhia, Ukraine

Sport
- Sport: Table tennis
Medal record
Men's para table tennis
Representing Ukraine
Paralympic Games
Gold medal – first place	2016 Rio de Janeiro	Team C6–8
Silver medal – second place	2020 Tokyo	Team C8
Bronze medal – third place	2020 Tokyo	Singles C8
Bronze medal – third place	2024 Paris	Singles C8

Maksym Vasyliovych Nikolenko (Ukrainian: Максим Васильович Ніколенко; born 14 August 1993) is a Ukrainian para table tennis player. He won the gold medal in the men's team C6–8 event at the 2016 Summer Paralympics held in Rio de Janeiro, Brazil.

In 2021, he won one of the bronze medals in the men's individual C8 event at the 2020 Summer Paralympics held in Tokyo, Japan. He also won the silver medal in the men's team C8 event.
