= Marcin Skrzynecki =

Paralympic para table tennis player

Personal information
- Born: 12 July 1986 (age 39) Warsaw, Poland
- Height: 1.92 m (6 ft 4 in)

Sport
- Country: Poland
- Sport: Para table tennis
- Disability class: C8
Medal record
Para table tennis
Representing Poland
Paralympic Games
Gold medal – first place	2012 London	Teams C6-8
Bronze medal – third place	2016 Rio de Janeiro	Teams C9-10
World Championships
Gold medal – first place	2010 Gwangju	Teams C8
Silver medal – second place	2010 Gwangju	Singles C8
Silver medal – second place	2014 Beijing	Teams C8
Bronze medal – third place	2018 Lasko	Singles C8
European Championships
Gold medal – first place	2009 Genoa	Singles C8
Gold medal – first place	2009 Genoa	Teams C8
Silver medal – second place	2007 Kranjska Gora	Teams C8
Bronze medal – third place	2013 Lignano	Teams C8
Bronze medal – third place	2017 Lasko	Teams C8
Bronze medal – third place	2019 Helsingborg	Teams C8

Marcin Skrzynecki (born 12 July 1986) is a Polish para table tennis player who competes at international table tennis competitions. He is a Paralympic and World champion and a double European champion in men's teams events. He has won his titles and medals with Piotr Grudzień.
