= Ross Wilson (table tennis) =

British table tennis player

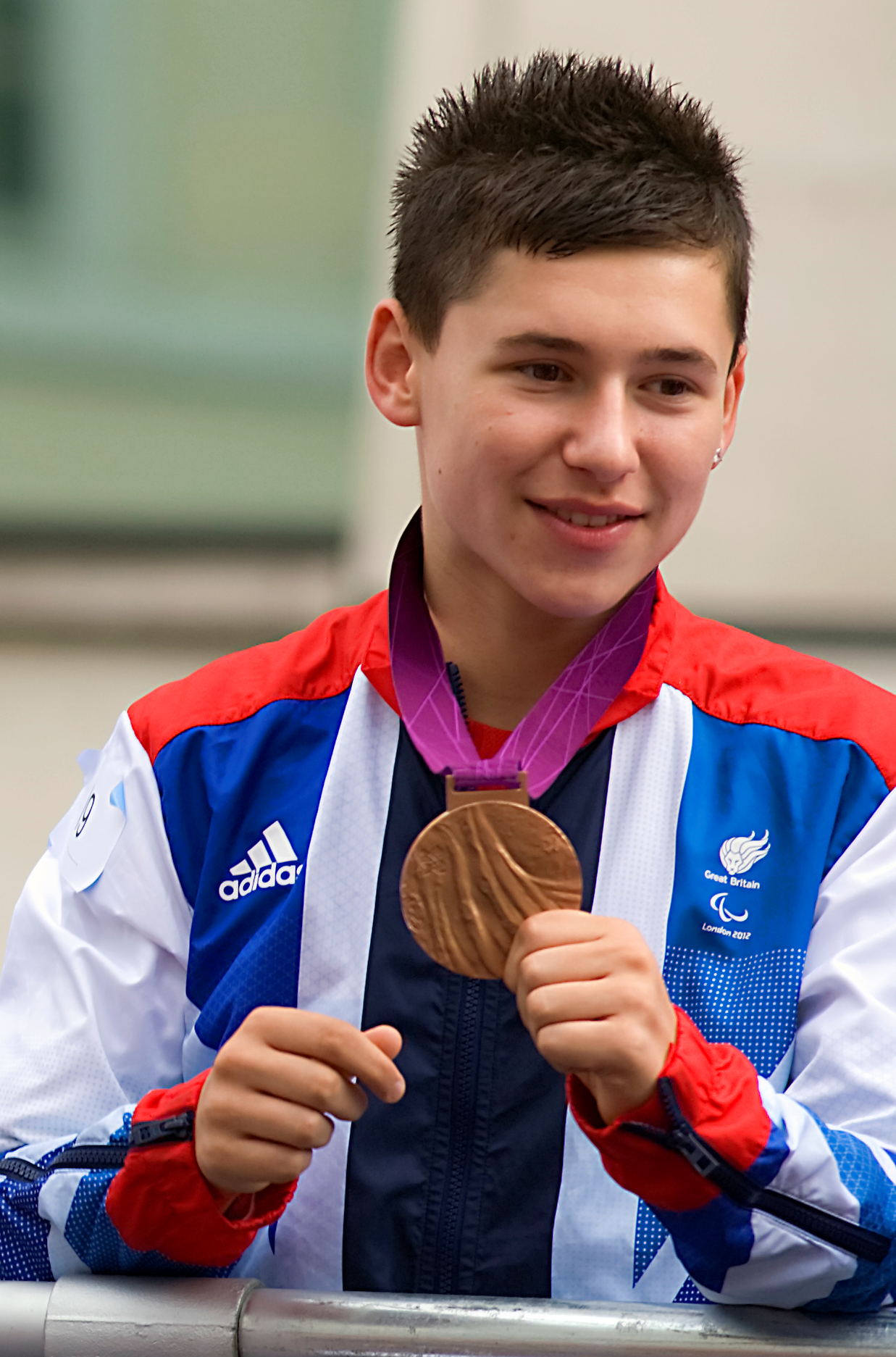
- Wilson after winning his 2012 Paralympic bronze

Personal information
- Nationality: British
- Born: 5 June 1995 (age 31) Minster, Isle of Sheppey, England

Sport
- Country: Great Britain
- Sport: Table tennis
- Event: Class 8

Achievements and titles
- Paralympic finals: 2012
Medal record
Men's table tennis
Representing Great Britain
Paralympic Games
Bronze medal – third place	2012 London	Team – Class 6–8
Bronze medal – third place	2016 Rio de Janeiro	Team – Class C6–8
Bronze medal – third place	2020 Tokyo	Team – Class 8
European Championships
Bronze medal – third place	2015 Vejle	Men's team – Class 8
Representing England
Commonwealth Games
Gold medal – first place	2018 Gold Coast	Singles – Class 6–10

Ross Wilson (born 5 June 1995) is a British paralympic table tennis player.

He competed at the 2011 European Championships in Split, Croatia, winning silver and gained another silver medal at the 2011 Bayreuth Open, Bayreuth, Germany, competing in the men's singles class 8. He has also been a two-time national doubles champion in non-disabled competition. In the 2012 Summer Paralympics he won a bronze medal in the men's team class 6–8.

== Personal life ==
Wilson was born in Minster, Kent. He has a genetic condition that affects his bones and their growth.
