= Para table tennis =

Disabled sport

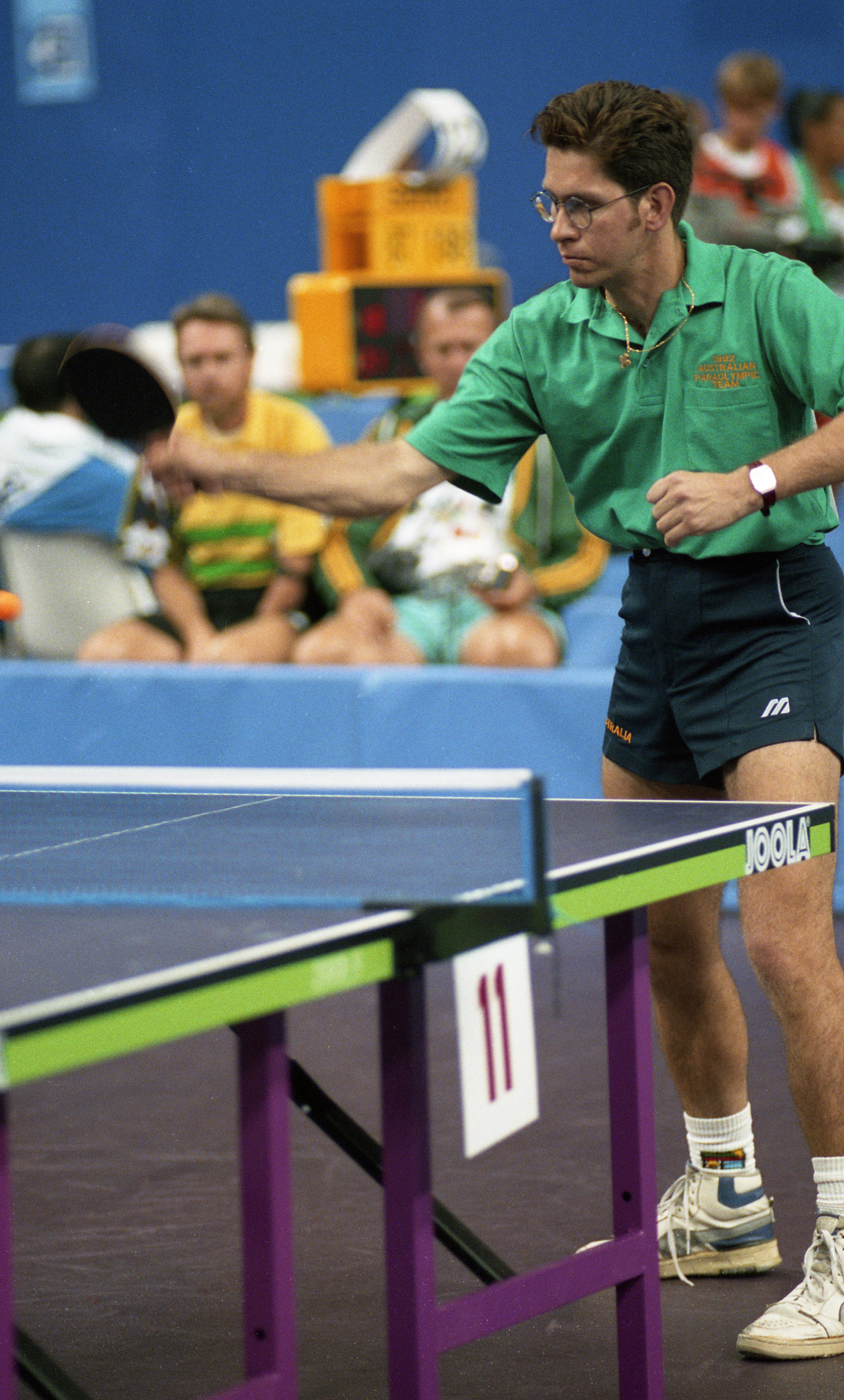
Table tennis at the 1992 Summer Paralympics.

Para table tennis is a Para sport that follows the rules set by the International Table Tennis Federation (ITTF). The usual table tennis rules are in effect with slight modifications for wheelchair athletes. Athletes from disability groups can take part. Athletes receive classifications between 1 and 11. Classes 1–5 are for those in wheelchairs and classes 6–10 for those who have disabilities that allow them to play standing. Within those groups, the higher classification means the more function the athlete has. Class 11 is defined for players with an intellectual disability.

== History ==
Para table tennis made its first appearance in the Paralympic Games in Rome 1960 and has been included in every Games since.

At the first Paralympic Games there were 11 medals which were contested by 35 athletes (20 men and 15 women) from 10 countries. Great Britain topped the medal table with a gold, followed by the Netherlands with a silver medal and Austria with a bronze. While Rome 1960 only featured athletes in wheelchairs, the growth in popularity of the sport meant a greater range of impairments were included for future Paralympic Games. Standing players were added in 1976, and in 1980 athletes with cerebral palsy and intellectual impairments were also included. The first Para table tennis World Championship was held in the Netherlands in 1990 with most gold medals won by Germany. Para table tennis has over 40 million competitive players and many recreational ones, marking it as the third largest played Paralympic sport, practiced in over 100 countries.

== Classification ==
The roles of classification are to determine eligibility to compete for athletes with disabilities and to group athletes equitably for competition purposes. Athletes are grouped by reference to functional ability, resulting from their impairment.

=== Sitting classes ===
Poland’s Natalia Partyka has competed at seven Paralympic Games winning 12 medals, including six gold in Class 10 events. She has also competed at four Olympic Games.

- Class 1:
  No sitting balance with severe reduction of function in the playing arm.
- Class 2:
  No sitting balance with reduction of function in the playing arm.
- Class 3:
  No sitting balance, although the upper part of the trunk may show activity.
  Normal arms, although some slight motor losses can be found in the playing hand without significant effect on table tennis skills.
  The non-playing arm keeps the trunk in position.
- Class 4:
  Existing sitting balance although not optimal because of non-existing anchorage (stabilisation) of the pelvis.
- Class 5:
  Normal function of trunk muscles.

=== Standing classes ===
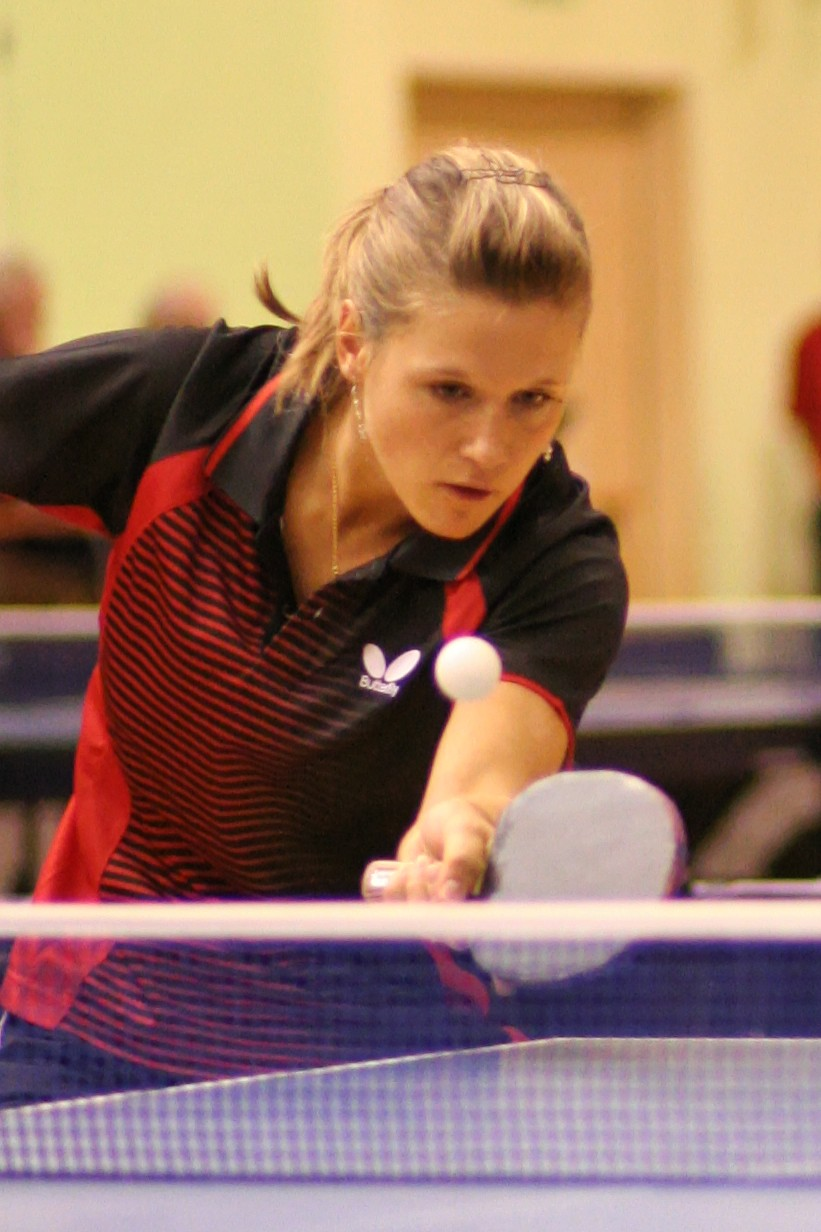
Poland’s Natalia Partyka has competed at seven Paralympic Games winning 12 medals, including six gold in Class 10 events. She has also competed at four Olympic Games.

- Class 6:
  Severe impairments of legs and arms.
- Class 7:
  Very severe impairments of legs (poor static and dynamic balance), or
  severe to moderate impairments of playing arm, or
  combination of arms and legs impairments less severe than in class 6.
- Class 8:
  Moderate impairments of the legs, or
  moderate impairments of playing arm (considering that elbow and shoulder control is very important), or
  moderate cerebral palsy, hemiplegia or diplegia with good playing arm.
- Class 9:
  Mild impairments of the leg(s), or
  mild impairments of playing arm, or
  severe impairments of non-playing arm, or
  mild cerebral palsy with hemiparesis or monoplegia.
- Class 10:
  Very mild impairments in legs, or
  very mild impairment of playing arm, or
  severe to moderate impairment of non-playing arm, or
  moderate impairment of the trunk.
- Class 11:
  For players with an intellectual disability.

== Laws of table tennis in wheelchair ==
There are no exceptions to the laws of table tennis for standing players with a disability. All players play according to the laws and regulations of the ITTF. The umpire may relax the requirements for a correct service if the compliance is prevented by physical disability.

=== Service ===
If the receiver is in a wheelchair, the service shall be a let under the following circumstances:

1. After touching the receiver's court, the ball returns in the direction of the net.
2. The ball comes to rest on the receiver's court.
3. In singles, the ball leaves the receiver's court after touching it by either of its sidelines.

If the receiver strikes the ball before it crosses a sideline or takes a second bounce on their side of the playing surface, the service is considered good and no let is called.

=== Doubles ===
When two players who are in wheelchairs are a pair playing doubles, the server shall first make a service, the receiver shall then make a return but thereafter either player of the disabled pair may make returns. However, no part of a player's wheelchair shall protrude beyond the imaginary extension of the center line of the table. If it does, the umpire shall award the point to the opposing pair.

=== Limb positions ===
If both players or pairs are in a wheelchair, the player or the pair score a point if:

1. the opponent does not maintain a minimum contact with the seat or cushion(s), with the back of the thigh, when the ball is struck.
2. the opponent touches the table with either hand before striking the ball.
3. the opponent's footrest or foot touches the floor during play.

=== Wheelchairs ===
Wheelchairs must have at least two large wheels and one small wheel. If the wheels on the player's wheelchair become dislodged and the wheelchair has no more than two wheels, then the rally must be stopped immediately and a point awarded to their opponent.

The height of one or maximum two cushions is limited to 15 cm in playing conditions with no other addition to the wheelchair. In team and class events, no part of the body above the knees may be attached to the chair as this could improve balance.

== Equipment and playing conditions ==
A player may not normally wear any part of a tracksuit during play. A player with a physical disability, either in a wheelchair or standing, may wear the trousers portion of a tracksuit during play, but jeans are not permitted.

Table legs shall be at least 40 cm from the end line of the table for wheelchair players. In international competitions, the playing space is not less than 14m long, 7m wide and the flooring shall not be concrete. The space for wheelchair events may be reduced to 8m long and 6m wide. The flooring may be of concrete for wheelchair events, which is prohibited on other occasions.

== Competitions ==
Five levels of international competitions are sanctioned. Factor of the tournament is counted in the tournament credit system used for qualification purpose of some tournaments. Players participate in regional championships (Fa50) earn 50 credit points. The tournament credit for the 2012 Summer Paralympics is 80 credit points must be met during a period starting on 4 November 2010 until 31 December 2011. It's also required a minimum tournament credit for the qualification of World Para Table Tennis Championships.

Competitions	Factor	Sanctioned by	Cycle of sanctioned competitions
Summer Paralympic Games	Fa100	IPC	Quadrennial, year 0
World Para Table Tennis Championships	Fa80	ITTF	Quadrennial, year 2
Regional Championships (Africa, Americas, Asia, Europe, Oceania)	Fa50	ITTF Para Table Tennis Division; Continental associations	Biennial, year 1 and 3
International Tournaments	Fa40	ITTF Para Table Tennis Division	Annual
International Tournaments	Fa20	ITTF Para Table Tennis Division	Annual

== Notable players ==
- Ibrahim Hamadtou, an Egyptian Class 6 Champion, is one of the most well-known Paralympic table tennis players, since his YouTube video went viral. Hamadtou has won many awards, including silver medals in African Para table tennis Championships held in 2013 and 2011. He holds his racket with his mouth.
- Natalia Partyka, a Four-time Olympian, participates in Class 10 events at the para table tennis tournaments, representing Poland. Born without a right hand and forearm, she participates in competitions for able-bodied athletes as well as in competitions for athletes with disabilities. Partyka reached the last 32 of the London 2012 Olympic women's table tennis.
