= Philippines at the 2012 Summer Paralympics =

- Flag of the Philippines
- IPC code: PHI
- NPC: Philippine Sports Association of the Differently Abled (PHILSPADA)

in London
- Competitors: 9 in 4 sports
- Flag bearer: Josephine Medina (opening)
- Medals Ranked 0th: Gold 0 Silver 0 Bronze 0 Total 0

Summer Paralympics appearances (overview)
- 1988; 1992; 1996; 2000; 2004; 2008; 2012; 2016; 2020; 2024

The Philippines competed at the 2012 Summer Paralympics in London, United Kingdom from August 29 to September 9, 2012. This was the nation's fifth time to send athletes to the Games. Philippine Sports Association for the Differently Abled-NPC Philippines fielded 9 athletes to compete in four sports. The 2012 Philippine Paralympic team was the biggest Philippine delegation since the 1988 Paralympics in Seoul, South Korea. Although no medals were won by the 9 athletes, Josephine Medina's performance in table tennis was the best finish for the Philippines, having ranked 4th overall in Paralympic Table Tennis standings.

== Athletics ==
Men's Track and Road Events

Athlete	Event	Heat		Final	
Athlete	Event	Result	Rank	Result	Rank
Roger Tapia	100m T46	11.75	6	did not advance	
Roger Tapia	200m T46	23.74	3	did not advance	
Isidro Vildosola	1500m T46	4:30.42	7	did not advance	

Men's Field Events

Athlete	Event	Distance	Rank
Andy Avellana	High Jump F42	1.55	6

Women's Field Events

Athlete	Event	Distance	Rank
Marites Burce	Javelin Throw F54-56	NM	

== Powerlifting ==
Men

Athlete	Event	Result	Rank
Agustin Kitan	-52kg	NMR	

Women

Athlete	Event	Result	Rank
Achelle Guion	-44kg	70	6
Adeline Ancheta	+82.5kg	120	6

== Swimming ==
Women

Athletes	Event	Heat		Final	
Athletes	Event	Time	Rank	Time	Rank
Bea Roble	50m freestyle S6	47.24	20	did not advance	
Bea Roble	100m freestyle S6	1:41.27	20	did not advance	

== Table tennis ==
Women

Athlete	Event	Group Stage				Semifinals	Final	
Athlete	Event	Opposition Result	Opposition Result	Opposition Result	Rank	Opposition Result	Opposition Result	Rank
Josephine Medina	Individual C8	Mao (CHN); L 0-3	Rodrigues (BRA); W 3-0	Dahlen (NOR); W 3-1	2 Q	Kamkasomphou (FRA); L 0-3	Bronze Medal Match; Abrahamsson (SWE); L 0-3	4

== See also ==
- Philippines at the Olympics
- Philippines at the Paralympics
- Philippines at the 2012 Summer Olympics
