= Philippines at the 2016 Summer Paralympics =

- Flag of the Philippines
- IPC code: PHI
- NPC: Paralympic Committee of the Philippines

in Rio de Janeiro
- Competitors: 5 in 4 sports
- Flag bearer: Josephine Medina
- Medals Ranked 76th: Gold 0 Silver 0 Bronze 1 Total 1

Summer Paralympics appearances (overview)
- 1988; 1992; 1996; 2000; 2004; 2008; 2012; 2016; 2020; 2024

The Philippines competed at the 2016 Summer Paralympics in Rio de Janeiro, Brazil, from 7 to 18 September 2016.

== Background ==
The Philippine Paralympic delegation was represented by 5 sportspeople in four sports. Table tennis player Josephine Medina was the delegation's flag bearer in the opening ceremony, for the second straight time.

The delegation included coaches, Ramond Debuque (powelifting), Joel Deriada (athletics), Louise Mark Eballa (table tennis), and Antonio Ong (swimming), with Dennis Esta as the Chef d' Mision and as well as the team doctor Raul Michael Cembrano. Philippine Sports Association of the Differently Abled President Michael Barredo and Secretary General Ral Rosario was also part of the Paralympic delegation.

== Athletics ==
The Philippines qualified 1 athlete for athletics. Long jumper Andy Avellana, was also among the athletes reportedly to have qualified but was not part of the Philippine delegation in later reports because he was not able to get a wildcard slot.

Track

Athlete	Events	Heat		Semifinal		Final	
Athlete	Events	Time	Rank	Time	Rank	Time	Rank
Jerrold Pete Mangliwan	100m - T52	20.04	7	did not advance			
Jerrold Pete Mangliwan	400m - T52	1:02.67	3 Q	—N/a		1:04.93	7

== Swimming ==
The Philippines has qualified 1 athlete for Swimming.

Athlete	Event	Heat		Final	
Athlete	Event	Time	Rank	Time	Rank
Ernie Gawilan	100m freestyle S8	1:06.64	15	did not advance	
Ernie Gawilan	400m freestyle S8	4:54.24	10	did not advance	
Ernie Gawilan	100m backstroke S8	1:19.75	9	did not advance	

== Table tennis ==
The Philippines qualified 1 athlete for table tennis.

Women

Athlete	Event	Preliminaries			Quarterfinals	Semifinals	Final / BM	
Athlete	Event	Opposition Result	Opposition Result	Rank	Opposition Result	Opposition Result	Opposition Result	Rank
Josephine Medina	Singles class 8	Mao (CHN); L 0–3	Dahlen (NOR); W 3–2	2 Q	—N/a	Kamkasomphou (FRA); L 0–3	Wolf (GER); W 3–0	3rd place, bronze medalist(s)

== Powerlifting ==
The Philippines qualified 2 athletes ( and ) for Powerlifting.

Athlete	Event	Total lifted	Rank
Agustin Kitan	Men's –59 kg	145	7
Adeline Dumapong-Ancheta	Women's +86 kg	NMR	–

== See also ==
- Philippines at the 2016 Summer Olympics
