= Philippines at the 2020 Summer Paralympics =

- IPC code: PHI
- NPC: Paralympic Committee of the Philippines

in Tokyo
- Competitors: 4 in 3 sports
- Flag bearer (opening): Jerrold Mangliwan
- Flag bearer (closing): Ernie Gawilan
- Medals: Gold 0 Silver 0 Bronze 0 Total 0

Summer Paralympics appearances (overview)
- 1988; 1992; 1996; 2000; 2004; 2008; 2012; 2016; 2020; 2024

The Philippines participated at the 2020 Summer Paralympics in Tokyo, Japan, from 24 August to 5 September 2021 which was postponed due to the COVID-19 pandemic. The country qualified six athletes, but only three in two sports were able to compete due to three athletes testing positive for COVID-19. The delegation did not win any medal for the first time since the 2012 edition.

== Background ==
Francis Carlos Diaz served as chef de mission prior to the Paralympics. The delegation was planned to compose of a total of 21 people, including six athletes, six coaches, two medical team members, and seven sports officials and executives.

The prevailing COVID-19 pandemic, which caused a one-year delay to the 2020 Summer Paralympics itself, affected the preparation of the Philippines' para-athletes due to their usual training venues converted to quarantine facilities and the lack of international competitions. The delegation itself was affected with COVID-19, with officials, coaches and athletes testing positive for the disease. Part of the delegation did not leave for Tokyo due to contracting COVID-19 on August 22, 2021. Achelle Guion, Jeanette Aceveda and Allain Ganapin were the athletes unable to compete due to testing positive for COVID-19. Paralympic Committee of the Philippines President Michael Barredo assumed the role of chef de mission after Francis Carlos Diaz also caught the disease.

In the Parade of Nations of the opening ceremony, the delegation was headed by flagbearer Jerrold Mangliwan. They wore barong Tagalog designed by Taal, Batangas outfitter Bordadao ni Apolonia and salakot.

== Competitors ==
The Philippines was supposed send a delegation of six athletes and be represented in four sports. Three are two-time athletes while the rest are making their debut in the Paralympics.

On 22 August 2021, Powerlifter Achelle Guion who qualified through a bi-partite invitation was unable to leave for Tokyo after testing positive for COVID-19 forcing her to withdraw. On August 29, para discus thrower Jeanette Aceveda and her coach both of which are already in Tokyo were announced to have tested positive for COVID-19. Like Guion, this forced Aceveda to withdraw as well. The Philippines saw its third withdrawal after Para taekwondo jin Allain Ganapin test positive for COVID-19 on September 2.

The following is the list of number of competitors in the Games.

Sport	Men	Women	Total
Athletics	1	0	1
Swimming	2	0	1
Taekwondo	1	0	0
Total	4	0	4

== Athletics ==
The Philippines initially qualified 2 athletes for athletics. Wheelchair athlete Jerrold Mangliwan and para discus thrower Jeanette Aceveda qualified through bipartite commission invitations. However, Aceveda was forced to withdraw after testing positive for COVID-19 on August 29.

Mangliwan competing in the T52 classification finished sixth in the men's 1500 m eight and last in the men's 100 m events. His finish in the 1500 m event was a new personal best. He also competed in the men's 400 m, the only event he took part which had a preliminary round. He qualified for that event's final, and where clocked one minute and .80 seconds which would have been a new Philippine national record. However Mangliwan was disqualified for a lane infringement infraction.

Track & road events

Athlete	Event	Heat		Final	
Athlete	Event	Result	Rank	Result	Rank
Jerrold Mangliwan	Men's 400 m T52	1:03.41	4 q	DQ	
Jerrold Mangliwan	Men's 1500 m T52	—N/a		3:58.24	6
Jerrold Mangliwan	Men's 100 m T52	—N/a		20.08	8

== Swimming ==
The Philippines has qualified 2 athletes for swimming. World Para Swimming has officially allocated one slot for the Philippines with Ernie Gawilan nominated to fill in the first slot after meeting the minimum qualifying time for the 400m freestyle S6 event. Gawilan formalized his qualification to the Olympics when he took part in a review classification race in the 2021 World Para Swimming World Series in Berlin held on June 18, 2021. Meanwhile, Gary Bejino earned his qualification after getting a bipartite place in para swimming.

Both swimmers failed to win a medal. Gawilan was able to reach the final in one event and Bejino was able to set new personal bests in two events. Gawilan set a new Philippine national record in the men's 200 m individual medley, surpassing his own record of 2:53.41 he set in the 2018 Asian Para Games. Gawilan became the first athlete representing the Philippines to qualify for a final in a Paralympic swimming event when he secured a place in the men's 400 m freestyle S7 final.

Athlete	Event	Heat		Final	
Athlete	Event	Time	Rank	Time	Rank
Ernie Gawilan	Men's 200 m individual medley SM7	2:50.49 NR	9	Did Not Advance	
Ernie Gawilan	Men's 400 m freestyle S7	4:58.58	6 Q	4:56.24	6
Ernie Gawilan	Men's 100 m backstroke S7	1:21.60	10	Did Not Advance	
Gary Bejino	Men's 200 m individual medley SM6	3:17.19	17	Did Not Advance	
Gary Bejino	Men's 100 m backstroke S6	1:28:87	20	Did Not Advance	
Gary Bejino	Men's 50 m butterfly S6	36.14	14	Did Not Advance	
Gary Bejino	Men's 400 m freestyle S6	5:52.28	13	Did Not Advance	

== Taekwondo ==
The Philippines qualified one jin to compete at the Paralympics. Allain Ganapin qualified by receiving a bipartite commission invitation allocation quota. Ganapin tested positive for COVID-19 forcing him to withdraw. Since Ganapin was already drawn to compete against Abulfaz Abuzarli of Azerbaijan in the Round of 16, the Filipino jin was officially disqualified from the tie.

Athlete	Event	First round	Quarterfinals	Semifinals	Final	
Athlete	Event	Opposition Result	Opposition Result	Opposition Result	Opposition Result	Rank
Allain Ganapin	Men's –75 kg	Abuzarli (AZE); DSQ	did not advance			

== See also ==
- Philippines at the 2020 Summer Olympics
