= Philippines at the 2000 Summer Paralympics =

- Flag of the Philippines
- IPC code: PHI
- NPC: Philippine Sports Association of the Differently Abled (PHILSPADA)

in Sydney
- Competitors: 2 in 2 sports
- Medals Ranked 64th: Gold 0 Silver 0 Bronze 1 Total 1

Summer Paralympics appearances (overview)
- 1988; 1992; 1996; 2000; 2004; 2008; 2012; 2016; 2020; 2024

The Philippines competed at the 2000 Summer Paralympics in Sydney. The country was represented by two athletes: Andres Lubin in the men's javelin (F57 category), and Adeline Dumapong in women's powerlifting, in the up to 82.5 kg category.

Mike Barredo was the chef de mission.

Lubin achieved a throw of 22.47m, and ranked 11th out of 12.

Dumapong lifted 110 kilograms to win the bronze in her event. She thus became the Philippines' first -and so far only- Paralympic medalist until table tennis paralympian Josephine Medina won another bronze medal in the Rio Paralympics 16 years later. Adeline Dumapong's bronze medal win was a momentous event for the Philippines as this was the first time the country failed to win a single medal in the 2000 Summer Olympics since 1984.

== Medallists ==
Medal	Name	Sport	Event
Bronze	Adeline Dumapong	Powerlifting	Women's -82.5 kg

== Athletics ==
Men's Field Events

Athlete	Event	Distance	Rank
Andres Lubin	Javelin F57	22.47	11

== Powerlifting ==
The Philippines qualified 1 athlete for Powerlifting.

Athlete	Event	Total lifted	Rank
Adeline Dumapong	Women's +86 kg	110.0	3rd place, bronze medalist(s)

== See also ==
- Philippines at the Paralympics
- Philippines at the 2000 Summer Olympics
