= Philippines at the Paralympics =

- Flag of the Philippines
- IPC code: PHI
- NPC: Paralympic Committee of the Philippines
- Medals: Gold 0 Silver 0 Bronze 2 Total 2

Summer appearances
- 1988; 1992; 1996; 2000; 2004; 2008; 2012; 2016; 2020; 2024

The Philippines made its Paralympic Games debut at the 1988 Summer Paralympics in Seoul and has been fielding athletes up to the 2020 Summer Paralympics in Tokyo. Its athletes has won two bronze medals; Adeline Dumapong in powerlifting (2000), and Josephine Medina in table tennis (2016). The country has never won a Paralympic gold medal.

The Philippines, being a tropical nation, has never competed in the Winter Paralympics.

== History ==
The Philippines made their Paralympic Games debut at the 1988 Summer Paralympics in Seoul, with three men competing in athletics and one in swimming. It returned for the 2000 Games in Sydney, with a male athlete in the javelin event and a female powerlifter, Adeline Dumapong. Dumapong won her country's first Paralympic medal when she took the bronze medal in the Up to 82.5 kg event, lifting 110 kg. In the 2004 Athens edition, the Philippines were represented by two powerlifters.

In the 2008 Beijing Paralympics, Dumapong was due to compete, but was a non-starter in her event. The country's other representatives were in Paralympic Sailing, in the Mixed Two Person SKUD18 keelboat event who likewise finished last. The much better funded Philippine Olympic athletes had likewise failed to win any medals in the 2008 Summer Olympics.

The 2012 London Paralympic Games saw 9 Filipino athletes competing in four sports. The Philippine Paralympic team was the biggest Philippine delegation since the 1988 Paralympics in South Korea. Just like the Filipino athletes who competed in the 2012 Summer Olympics, no medals were won by the 9 para athletes. However, Josephine Medina's table tennis game ranked 4th overall in Paralympic Table Tennis standings and was the best finish for the Philippines.

In the 2016 Rio de Janeiro Paralympic Games, the Philippines snared its second Paralympic medal, ending the country's 16-year medal drought. Medina bagged bronze medal at the women's single table tennis after defeating Juliane Wolf of Germany.

Starting in 2017, Paralympic athletes winning medals at the Paralympic games will be entitled to government incentives through the Philippines Sports Commission per R.A. 10699.

== Sports competed ==
- Archery (2024)
- Athletics (1988, 2000, 2012–2024)
- Powerlifting (2000, 2004–2016)
- Sailing (2008)
- Swimming (1988, 2012–2024)
- Table Tennis (2012–2016)
- Taekwondo (2020-2024)

== Medal table ==
=== Medals by Summer Games ===
Summer Paralympic Games
Games	Athletes	Gold	Silver	Bronze	Total	Rank
(South Korea) 1988 Seoul	4	0	0	0	0	-
(Spain) 1992 Barcelona	Did not compete (Note: Did not compete in the Paralympics in Barcelona, but did take part in the 1992 Paralympic Games for Persons with Mental Handicap in Madrid which immediately followed the games in Barcelona.)					
(United States) 1996 Atlanta	Did not compete					
(Australia) 2000 Sydney	2	0	0	1	1	64
(Greece) 2004 Athens	2	0	0	0	0	-
(China) 2008 Beijing	3	0	0	0	0	-
(United Kingdom) 2012 London	9	0	0	0	0	-
(Brazil) 2016 Rio de Janeiro	5	0	0	1	1	76
(Japan) 2020 Tokyo	4	0	0	0	0	0
(France) 2024 Paris	6	0	0	0	0	0
(United States) 2028 Los Angeles	Future event					
Total	-	0	0	2	2	119

== List of medalists ==
Medal	Name	Games	Sport	Event
Bronze	Adeline Dumapong	(Australia) Sydney 2000	Powerlifting	Women's −82.5 kg
Bronze	Josephine Medina	(Brazil) Rio de Janeiro 2016	Table tennis	Singles class 8

== See also ==
- Philippines at the Olympics
- Philippines at the Asian Games
