= Philippines at the 2024 Summer Paralympics =

- IPC code: PHI
- NPC: Paralympic Committee of the Philippines

in Paris, France August 28, 2024 – September 8, 2024
- Competitors: 6 in 4 sports
- Flag bearers (opening): Agustina Bantiloc; Ernie Gawilan
- Flag bearers (closing): Allain Ganapin; Cendy Asusano
- Officials: Ral Rosario (chef de mission)
- Medals: Gold 0 Silver 0 Bronze 0 Total 0

Summer Paralympics appearances (overview)
- 1988; 1992; 1996; 2000; 2004; 2008; 2012; 2016; 2020; 2024

The Philippines competed at the 2024 Summer Paralympics in Paris, France, from 28 August to 8 September. The country qualified six athletes in four sports. This was the second consecutive Paralympiad wherein the Philippines failed to win a medal. Its best finish was 4th in Women's Javelin Throw F54 courtesy of Cendy Asusano. Other close shaves included Jerrold Mangliwan's, Ernie Gawilan's, and Angel Otom's performances in the final of their respective events.

== Background ==
The Philippine delegation would arrive in France by August 12, ahead of the opening ceremony to train in Nimes. Gerardo Rosario was the chef de mission of the delegation.

At the opening ceremony the athletes wore outfits which were designed by women's fashion brand Ditta. Owner Ditta Sandico herself was involved and was assisted by Janinna Santos. The men, would wear black jackets adorned with traditional textile or habol handwoven individually by members of the Mangyan people. The women would wear a wrap or a pañuelo made of banana and abaca fibers with a design and colors inspired from the Philippine flag and a sun-motif brooch. The women wore wear yellow hats while the men wore wear blue. Ernie Gawilan and Agustina Bantiloc were the opening ceremony flagbearers.

Cendy Asusano would be named as closing ceremony flagbearer, a distinction initially assigned to Angel Otom. Allain Ganapin would join Asusano.

== Competitors ==
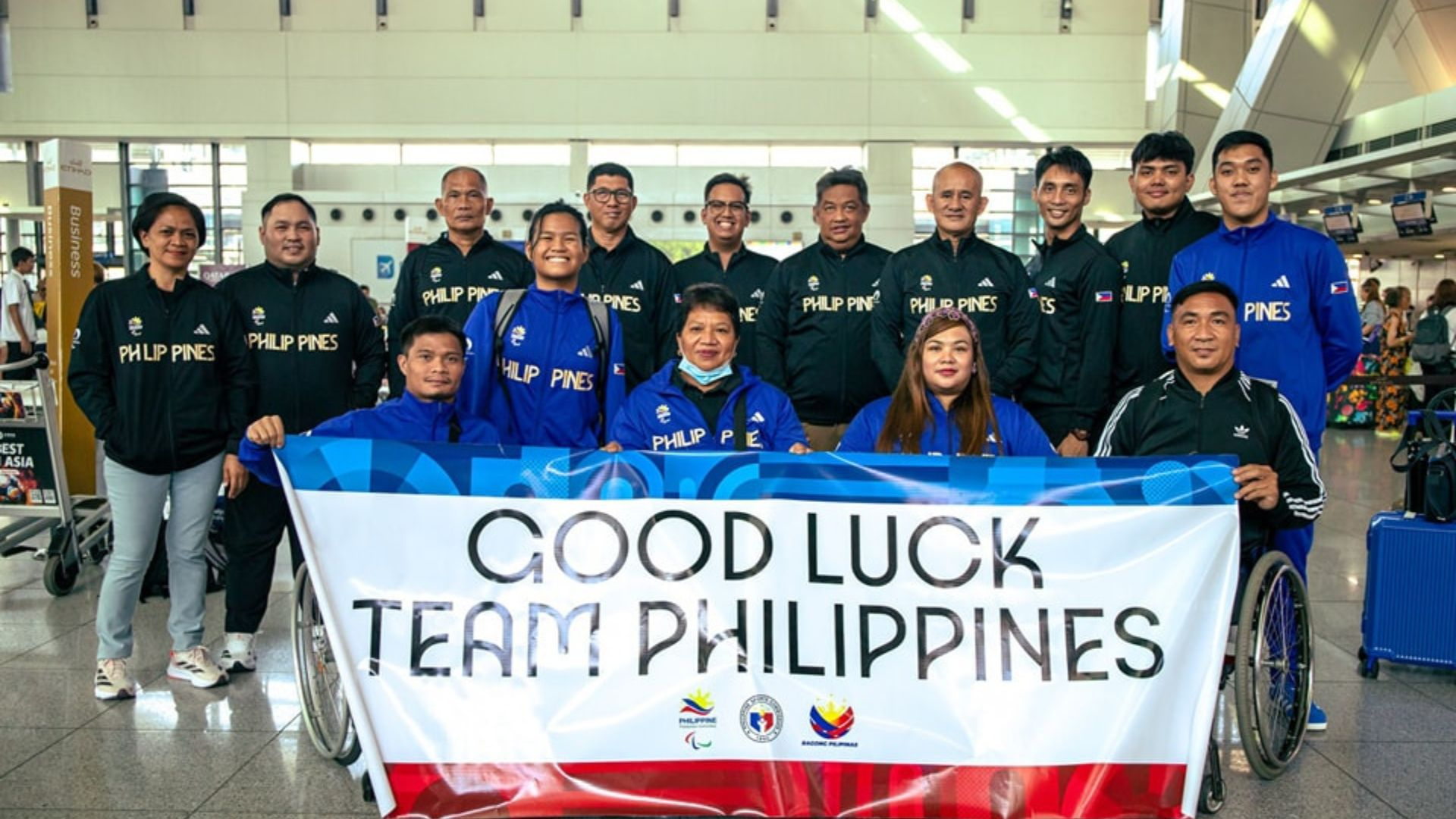
Philippine delegation in France.

The following is the list of number of competitors in the Games.

Sport	Men	Women	Total
Archery	0	1	1
Athletics	1	1	2
Swimming	1	1	2
Taekwondo	1	0	1
Total	3	3	6

== Archery ==
The Philippines entered one archer into the games after Agustina Bantiloc qualified through Bipartite Commission (BPC) Invitation in the women's compound event. Bantiloc also qualified by achieving the Minimum Qualification Standard (MQS). Bantiloc is the oldest competitor of the delegation at 55 years old.

Bantiloc scored 618 in the open ranking round, her season best but placed last among 28 competitors pitting her against fifth seed Jane Karla Gögel of Brazil in the round of 32. Bantiloc ended her campaign after losing 127–143 to Gögel.

Women

Athlete	Event	Ranking Round		Round of 32	Round of 16	Quarterfinals	Semifinals	Finals	
Athlete	Event	Score	Seed	Opposition Score	Opposition Score	Opposition Score	Opposition Score	Opposition Score	Rank
Agustina Bantiloc	Individual compound	618	28	Gögel (BRA); L 127–143	Did not advance				

== Athletics ==
The Philippines qualified two athletes in the Games. Jerrold Mangliwan was qualified after winning a gold medal in the men's 400 meter-T52 and silver in the men's 100 meter-T52 in the 2022 Asian Para Games in Hangzhou, China. Meanwhile, Filipina javelin thrower, Cendy Asusano will make her Paralympic debut and will represent the country in the Games. In the 2024 World Para Athletics Championships held in Kobe, Japan, Asusano finished in fourth place in the biennial event.

In the men's 400 m T52, Mangliwan would progress to the final where he finished eight place. His race was hampered by rain. In the 100 m, Mangliwan finished last overall among 12 racers. The 100 m race was his weaker event among the two.

Asusano registered a personal best in the women's javelin thro F54, but finished as fourth barely missing a place in the podium.

=== Men's track ===
Athlete	Event	Heat		Final	
Athlete	Event	Result	Rank	Result	Rank
Jerrold Mangliwan	Men's 400 m T52	1:05.79	4 q	1:04.55	8
Jerrold Mangliwan	Men's 100 m T52	19.44	6	Did not advance	

=== Women's field ===
Athlete	Event	Final	
Athlete	Event	Result	Rank
Cendy Asusano	Women's javelin throw F54	15.05 PB	4

== Swimming ==
The Philippines qualified two swimmers (one man and one woman) to compete at the games, by achieving the MQS allocation slots. This will be Gawilan's third consecutive Paralympics participation having taken part in the 2016 and 2020 editions.

Gawilan did not advance from the 200 m individual medley SM7 his first event at Paris 2024. He finished last among eleven swimmers. His time is slower than the 2:50.49 record he set in the 2020 Paralympics. Coach Tony Ong projected him to qualify for the 200 m final which they used as a tune up for the 400 m freestyle. His struggle in the breaststroke sequence was assessed to be the reason of his elimination in the heats.

He would perform better in the 400 m freestyle S7, his pet event. He would finish third overall in the heats to advance to the final. However he would miss the podium, finishing sixth place.

Otom shattered her previous personal best of 44.72 seconds with a 44.03 in the heats of the 50 m backstroke S5. She placed 4th in her heat and 7th overall to sneak in to the final. In the final, she was in bronze medal position until the 25-meter mark where she slowly faded to clock in at exactly 44 seconds and eventually wind up 6th in her Paralympic Games debut, smashing her short-lived personal best by three hundredths of a second.

It was more or less the same story in the 50 m butterfly S5. Otom placed third in her heat with a 46.85 which was good for fifth overall and another final. In the final, Otom started out strong but decelerated towards the finish to end her debut Paralympic campaign in 5th.

Men

Athlete	Events	Heats		Final	
Athlete	Events	Time	Rank	Time	Rank
Ernie Gawilan	400 m freestyle S7	5:00.13	3 Q	5:03.18	6
Ernie Gawilan	200 m individual medley SM7	2:56.39	11	Did not advance	

Women

Athlete	Events	Heats		Final	
Athlete	Events	Time	Rank	Time	Rank
Angel Otom	50 m backstroke S5	44.03	7 Q	44.00	6
Angel Otom	50 m butterfly S5	46.85	5 Q	45.78	5

== Taekwondo ==
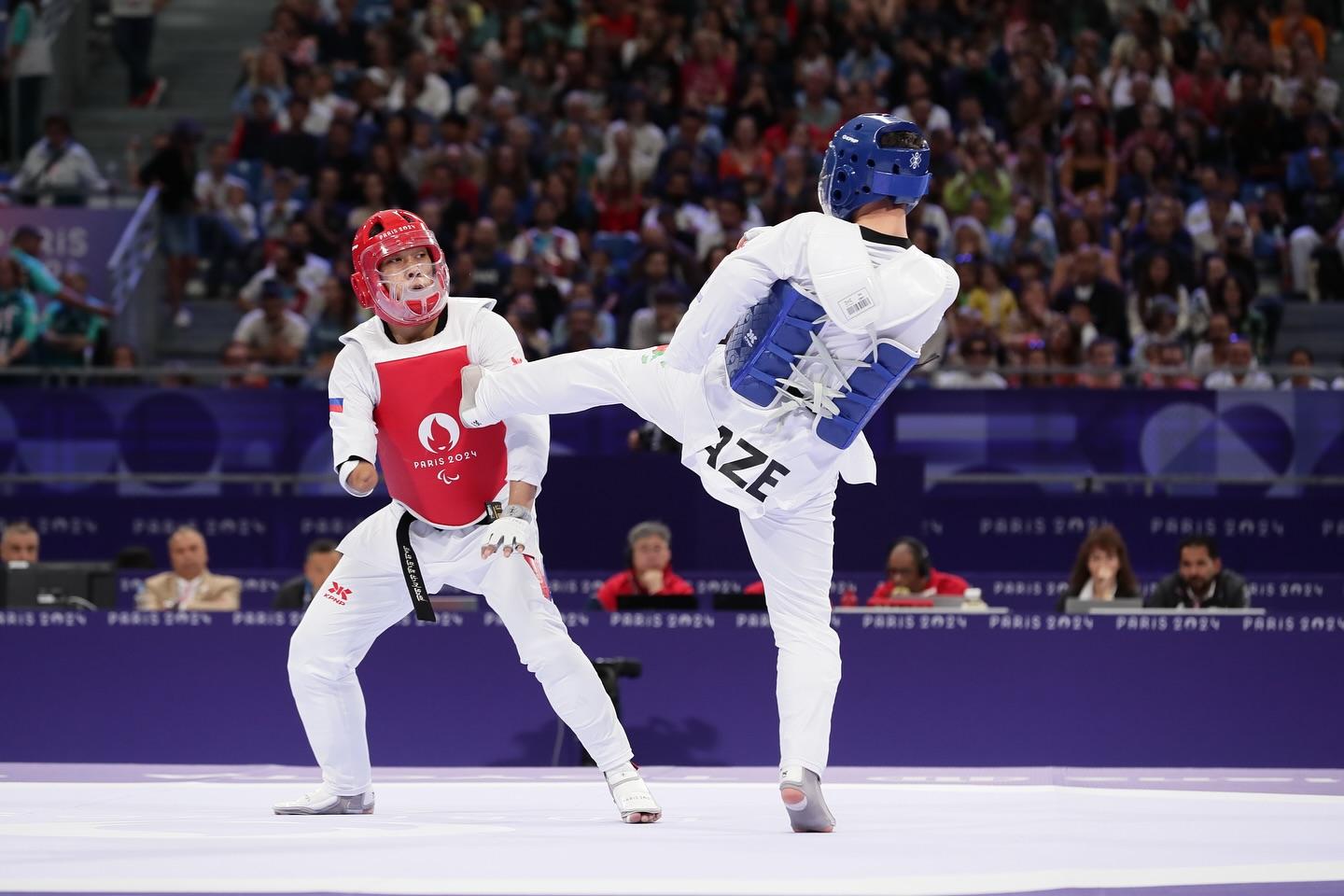
Ganapin (red) v. Abulfaz Abuzarli (blue).

Philippines entered one athlete to compete at the Paralympics competition. Allain Ganapin qualified for Paris 2024, after winning the gold medal results in his class, through the 2024 Asian Qualification Tournament in Tai'an, China. Ganapin have qualified previously for Tokyo 2020 but was unable to compete due to contracting COVID-19.

Ganapin won his first bout over Hadi Hassanzada of the Refugee Paralympic Team before ending his Olympic campaign to Abulfaz Abuzarli of Azerbaijan.

Athlete	Event	Preliminary round	First round	Quarterfinals	Semifinals	Repechage 1	Repechage 2	Final / BM	
Athlete	Event	Opposition Result	Opposition Result	Opposition Result	Opposition Result	Opposition Result	Opposition Result	Opposition Result	Rank
Allain Ganapin	Men's –80 kg	Hassanzada (RPT); W 22–13	Abuzarli (AZE); L 9–12	Did not advance					

== See also ==
- Philippines at the 2024 Summer Olympics
- Philippines at the Paralympics
