= Philippines at the 2004 Summer Paralympics =

- Flag of the Philippines
- IPC code: PHI
- NPC: Philippine Sports Association of the Differently Abled (PHILSPADA)

in Athens
- Competitors: 2 in 1 sport
- Medals: Gold 0 Silver 0 Bronze 0 Total 0

Summer Paralympics appearances (overview)
- 1988; 1992; 1996; 2000; 2004; 2008; 2012; 2016; 2020; 2024

The Philippines competed at the 2004 Summer Paralympics in Athens, Greece. The team had two Powerlifting athletes, one man and one woman, neither of whom won a medal. Previous to this edition of the Paralympics, the Philippines likewise failed to win an Olympic medal in Athens yet again.

== Powerlifting ==
Men

Athlete	Event	Result	Rank
Agustin Kitan	-52kg	120	14

Women

Athlete	Event	Result	Rank
Adeline Ancheta	+82.5kg	110	6

== See also ==
- Philippines at the Paralympics
- Philippines at the 2004 Summer Olympics
