= Nadia Ali (powerlifter) =

Egyptian Paralympic powerlifter (born 1974)

Personal information
- Born: 27 July 1974 (age 51) Cairo, Egypt

Sport
- Country: Egypt
- Sport: powerlifting
- Events: 67.5kg; +82.5kg; +86kg
Medal record
Women's powerlifting
Representing Egypt
Summer Paralympics
Silver medal – second place	2004 Athens	+82.5 kg
Silver medal – second place	2008 Beijing	+82.5 kg
Bronze medal – third place	2000 Sydney	-67.5 kg
Bronze medal – third place	2024 Paris	+86 kg
World Championships
Gold medal – first place	1998 Dubai	67.5kg
Silver medal – second place	2014 Dubai	+86 kg
Silver medal – second place	2023 Dubai	+86 kg
Bronze medal – third place	2002 Kuala Lumpur	67.5kg

Nadia Mohamed Ali (born 27 July 1974) is an Egyptian powerlifter. She has represented Egypt at the Summer Paralympics five times, in 2000, 2004, 2008, 2016 and 2024. In her first three appearances there, she had won a medal. She has also appeared in the World Para Powerlifting Championships six times, winning four medals.

== Early life and education ==
Nadia Ali was born in Cairo, on 27 July 1974. She attended Cairo University, where she obtained a degree in history.

== Career ==
Ali began her powerlifting career in 1997. Making her debut at the World Para Powerlifting Championships in 1998, she won the gold medal in the 67.5kg category. At the 2000 Summer Paralympics, she won the bronze medal in the -67.5 kg category. After winning a bronze medal in the 2002 World Championships, she competed in the 2004 Summer Paralympics, where she won the silver medal in the +82.5 kg event, a feat she repeated four years later.

At the 2014 IPC Powerlifting World Championships held in Dubai, United Arab Emirates, Ali won the silver medal in the women's +86 kg event. She then competed in the 2019 and 2021 World Para Powerlifting Championships, where she finished in fifth place in both. In 2023, Ali won the silver medal in her event at the 2023 World Para Powerlifting Championships held in Dubai, United Arab Emirates. At the 2024 Summer Paralympics, she won her fourth Paralympic medal by winning the bronze medal in the +86 kg event.

== Personal life ==
Ali is the mother of two sons.
