= Powerlifting at the 2016 Summer Paralympics – Men's 59 kg =

Powerlifting – Men's 59 kg at the XV Paralympic Games
- Venue: Riocentro
- Date: 9 September 2016
- Competitors: 10 from 10 nations
- Winning lift: 211.0 kg WR

Medalists
1st place, gold medalist(s)		Sherif Othman	Egypt
2nd place, silver medalist(s)		Ali Jawad	Great Britain
3rd place, bronze medalist(s)		Yang Quanxi	China

The men's 59 kg powerlifting event at the 2016 Summer Paralympics was contested on 9 September at Riocentro.

== Records ==
There are twenty powerlifting events, corresponding to ten weight classes each for men and women. The weight categories were significantly adjusted after the 2012 Games so most of the weights are new for 2016. As a result, no Paralympic record was available for this weight class prior to the competition. The existing world records were as follows.

Record Type	Weight	Country	Venue	Date
World record	210.5 kg	Sherif Othman (EGY)	Dubai	16 February 2016
Paralympic record	–	–	–	–

== Results ==
Rank	Name	Body weight (kg)	Attempts (kg)				Result (kg)
Rank	Name	Body weight (kg)	1	2	3	4	Result (kg)
1st place, gold medalist(s)	Sherif Othman (EGY)	57.83	203.0	~~211.0~~	~~211.0~~	211.0 WR PR	203.0
2nd place, silver medalist(s)	Ali Jawad (GBR)	58.66	190.0	~~194.0~~	~~194.0~~	–	190.0
3rd place, bronze medalist(s)	Yang Quanxi (CHN)	58.76	176.0	~~185.0~~	~~191.0~~		176.0
4	Narong Kasanun (THA)	57.70	165.0	~~175.0~~	~~176.0~~	–	165.0
5	Paschalis Kouloumoglou (GRE)	57.18	135.0	145.0	-	–	145.0
6	Juhani Kokko (FIN)	58.75	~~143.0~~	~~145.0~~	145.0	–	145.0
7	Agustin Kitan (PHI)	58.81	~~145.0~~	145.0	~~155.0~~	–	145.0
-	Gabriel Magu Wanjiku (KEN)	58.02	~~120.0~~	~~125.0~~	~~125.0~~	–	NMR
-	Mariusz Tomczyk (POL)	58.01	~~175.0~~	~~175.0~~	~~176.0~~	–	NMR
-	Juan Carlos Garrido (CHI)	58.86	~~185.0~~	~~185.0~~	~~186.0~~	–	NMR
