= Jin Yucheng (table tennis) =

Chinese para table tennis player

Personal information
- Born: 25 May 2008 (age 18) Sichuan, China

Sport
- Sport: Para table tennis
- Disability class: C6
Medal record
Para table tennis
Representing China
Paralympic Games
Gold medal – first place	2024 Paris	Doubles WD14
Asian Para Games
Bronze medal – third place	2022 Hangzhou	Singles C6

Jin Yucheng (born 25 May 2008) is a Chinese para table tennis player. She represented China at the 2024 Summer Paralympics.

== Career ==
Jin represented China at the 2022 Asian Para Games in table tennis and won a gold medal in the doubles C14 event, along with Huang Wenjuan, and a bronze medal in the singles C6 event.

Jin represented China at the 2024 Summer Paralympics in the women's doubles WD14 event, along with Huang. They defeated Felicity Pickard and Bly Twomey in the semifinals to advance to the gold medal match.
