= Ebere =

- Language: Igbo

Origin
- Word/name: Nigeria
- Meaning: Mercy, kindness

Ebere is a Nigerian Igbo unisex name meaning "mercy" or "kindness".

== Given name ==
- Ebere Eze, English footballer
- Ebere Onwudiwe, Nigerian political scientist and economist
- Ebere Orji, Nigerian footballer
- Ebere Paul Onuachu, Nigerian footballer
- Grace Ebere Anozie, Nigerian Paralympic powerlifter
- Peter Ebere Okpalaeke, Nigerian prelate

== Surname ==
- Christian Ebere, Nigerian footballer
- Ngozi Ebere, Nigerian footballer
