= Philippines at the 2008 Summer Paralympics =

- Flag of the Philippines
- IPC code: PHI
- NPC: Philippine Sports Association of the Differently Abled (PHILSPADA)

in Beijing
- Competitors: 3 in 2 sports
- Flag bearers: Adeline Dumapong (opening); Pedro Sollique (closing)
- Medals Ranked -th: Gold 0 Silver 0 Bronze 0 Total 0

Summer Paralympics appearances (overview)
- 1988; 1992; 1996; 2000; 2004; 2008; 2012; 2016; 2020; 2024

Three athletes represented the Philippines in the 2008 Summer Paralympics in Beijing, China. The 2-person keelboat sailing team of Pedro Sollique and Cherry Pinpin were based in the seaport city of Qingdao while Adeline Dumapong was in Beijing for the powerlifting event. The Philippine Paralympic delegation was headed by PhilSPADA-NPC, with support from the Philippine Sports Commission and the Philippine Olympic Committee.

== Powerlifting ==
Women

| Athlete | Event | Result | Rank |
|---|---|---|---|
| Adeline Dumapong | +82.5 kg | Did not start | |

== Sailing ==
The SKUD 18 - a highly technical, high performance keelboat. Photo: Jackie Kay, Sailability World. Boat Designers: Chris Mitchell and Julian Bethwaite

The Philippines first Paralympic Sailing Team competed on the 2-person keelboat (SKUD 18), which also made its official debut in the Paralympics. The only Paralympic class keelboat with a spinnaker, was, for this event, emblazoned with the national flag of each country. Pedro Sollique, paraw fisherman from Virac, Catanduanes was SKUD helm while crew Cherry Pinpin, a creative director from Quezon City trimmed sails and flew the spinnaker. The Philippine flag spinnaker was a generous, timely donation by an anonymous Australian businessman.

The Sailing competition of the Beijing 2008 Paralympic Games took place on the Yellow Sea, Qingdao, from September 8 to September 13. The Qingdao International Sailing Centre served as measuring and decal application area, boat workspace, dock, public viewing areas and awards area. Qingdao, in eastern Shandong province, a seaside sailing city famous for its Tsingtao Beer, seafood and white sand beaches, is an hour's flight SE of Beijing. The rest of the Qingdao-based team was composed of Philippine Sailing Association National Coach Rico Albeso plus PHI Sailing team manager and Sailability Philippines President, Claudio Altura.

The sailors had qualified the Philippines for the Summer Paralympics during the IFDS Two-Person Keelboat World Championship held March 2008, in Singapore. The SKUD 18 has already been approved for competition in the London 2012 Paralympics.

| Athlete | Position | Event | Race | | | | | | | | | | | Score | Rank |
| Athlete | Position | Event | 1 | 2 | 3 | 4 | 5 | 6 | 7 | 8 | 9 | 10 | 11 | Score | Rank |
|---|---|---|---|---|---|---|---|---|---|---|---|---|---|---|---|
| Pedro Sollique; Cherry Pinpin | helm crew | 2-person keelboat (SKUD18) | ~~11~~ | ~~11~~ | 10 | 11 | 11 | 10 | 11 | 10 | 11 | 10 | CAN | 84 | 11 |

Note: CAN - Race cancelled • Races Sailed: 10 • Score Discards: 2 • Races counted: 8

== See also ==
- 2008 Summer Paralympics
- Sailing at the 2008 Summer Paralympics
- Philippines at the 2008 Summer Olympics
- SKUD 18
- Sport in the Philippines
