= Powerlifting at the 2004 Summer Paralympics – Women's +82.5 kg =

Women's Over 82.5 kg at the XII Paralympic Games
- Paralympic Powerlifting
- Venue: Nikaia Olympic Weightlifting Hall
- Dates: 25 September 2004
- Competitors: 8 from 8 nations
- Winning weight(kg): 160.0

Medalists
1st place, gold medalist(s)		Li Rui Fang	China
2nd place, silver medalist(s)		Nadia Fekry	Egypt
3rd place, bronze medalist(s)		Grace Anozie	Nigeria

The Women's +82.5 kg powerlifting event at the 2004 Summer Paralympics was competed on 25 September. It was won by Li Rui Fang, representing China.

== Final round ==
25 Sept. 2004, 14:30

Rank	Athlete	Weight(kg)	Notes
1st place, gold medalist(s)	Li Rui Fang (CHN)	160.0	WR
2nd place, silver medalist(s)	Nadia Fekry (EGY)	145.0	
3rd place, bronze medalist(s)	Grace Anozie (NGR)	140.0	
4	Tetyana Frolova (UKR)	132.5	
5	Deahnne McIntyre (AUS)	130.0	
6	Liudmila Hreben (BLR)	125.0	
7	Adeline Ancheta (PHI)	110.0	
8	Marina Dyakonova (RUS)	107.5	
