= Powerlifting at the 2004 Summer Paralympics – Men's 52 kg =

Men's Up To 52 kg at the XII Paralympic Games
- Paralympic Powerlifting
- Venue: Nikaia Olympic Weightlifting Hall
- Dates: 21 September 2004
- Competitors: 16 from 16 nations
- Winning weight(kg): 177.5

Medalists
| 1st place, gold medalist(s) | | Osama El Serngawy | Egypt |
| 2nd place, silver medalist(s) | | Wu Guojing | China |
| 3rd place, bronze medalist(s) | | Gholamhossein Chaltoukkar | Iran |

The Men's 52 kg powerlifting event at the 2004 Summer Paralympics was competed on 21 September. It was won by Osama El Serngawy, representing Egypt.

== Final round ==
21 Sept. 2004, 17:15

| Rank | Athlete | Weight(kg) | Notes |
|---|---|---|---|
| 1st place, gold medalist(s) | Osama El Serngawy (EGY) | 177.5 | |
| 2nd place, silver medalist(s) | Wu Guojing (CHN) | 172.5 | |
| 3rd place, bronze medalist(s) | Gholamhossein Chaltoukkar (IRI) | 165.0 | |
| 4 | Mohammed Karim (IRQ) | 152.5 | |
| 5 | Andrzej Gren (POL) | 145.0 | |
| 6 | Roman Omurbekov (KGZ) | 135.0 | |
| 7 | Ayman Ali (SYR) | 132.5 | |
| 8 | Cesar Rubio Guerra (CUB) | 130.0 | |
| 9 | Ibrahim Al Brahim (KSA) | 130.0 | |
| 10 | Basha Farman (IND) | 127.5 | |
| 11 | Song Nam Kyou (KOR) | 127.5 | |
| 12 | Chia Chem Koh (MAS) | 127.5 | |
| 13 | Yusup Sapbiyev (TKM) | 125.0 | |
| 14 | Agustin Kitan (PHI) | 120.0 | |
| 15 | Alfred Adjetey Sowah (GHA) | 105.0 | |
| | Gerarco Merino (ECU) | NMR | |
