= Anozie (name) =

- Gender: Male
- Language: Igbo

Origin
- Origin: Igbo
- Meaning: We are now settled or well positioned
- Region of origin: Igboland

Anozie audiois an Igbo male name and surname. It means "We are now settled or well positioned". Anozie is distinctive, carrying a strong and meaningful undertone and is reserved for occasions of great importance.

== Notable individuals with the name ==
- Gloria Young (née Anozie, born 1967), Nigerian actress.
- Grace Anozie (born 1977), Nigerian athlete.
- Nonso Anozie (born 1978), British actor.
