= Merethe Tveiten =

Norwegian para table tennis player

Personal information
- Born: 10 July 1995 (age 31)
- Home town: Notodden, Norway

Sport
- Sport: Para table tennis
- Disability class: C6
Medal record
Para table tennis
Representing Norway
Paralympic Games
Bronze medal – third place	2024 Paris	Doubles WD14
European Championships
Gold medal – first place	2023 Sheffield	Doubles WD14

Merethe Tveiten (born 10 July 1995) is a Norwegian para table tennis player. She represented Norway at the 2024 Summer Paralympics where she won a bronze medal in the women's doubles WD14 event with Aida Dahlen. Tveiten is also a European champion in the doubles class 14 with Dahlen.

== Career ==
Tveiten won the gold medal in the women's doubles WD 14 event with Aida Dahlen at the European Championships in 2023. She represented Norway at the 2024 Summer Paralympics in the women's doubles WD14 event, where she won a bronze medal together with Dahlen.
