= Athletics at the 2020 Summer Paralympics – Men's 100 metres T52 =

Men's 100 metres T52 at the XVI Paralympic Games
- Venue: Tokyo National Stadium
- Dates: 3 September 2021 (final)
- Competitors: 8 from 6 nations
- Winning time: 16.99

Medalists
1st place, gold medalist(s)		Raymond Martin	United States
2nd place, silver medalist(s)		Yuki Oya	Japan
3rd place, bronze medalist(s)		Leonardo De Jesus Perez Juarez	Mexico

Men's 100 metres
T11 · T12 · T13 · T33 · T34 · T35 · T36 · T37 · T38 · T47 · T51 · T52 · T53 · T54 · T63 · T64

The men's 100 metres T52 event at the 2020 Summer Paralympics in Tokyo, took place on 3 September 2021.

The T52 category is for wheelchair athletes with damage to spinal cord in the higher parts of the back, substantially impaired or no trunk function, and minimal or no leg function. Pushing power comes from elbow extensions, and appears close to normal except for use of modified gloves to compensate for grip.

== Records ==
Prior to the competition, the existing records were as follows:

World Record	Raymond Martin (USA)	16.41	Arbon, Switzerland	30 May 2019
Paralympic Record	Raymond Martin (USA)	16.79	London, United Kingdom	2 September 2012

Area	Time	Athlete	Nation
Africa	17.89	Brandon Beack	South Africa
America	16.41 WR	Raymond Martin	United States
Asia	17.12	Yuki Oya	Japan
Europe	16.98	Beat Bösch	Switzerland
Oceania	17.39	Sam McIntosh	Australia

== Results ==
The final took place on 3 September 2021, at 11:07:

Rank	Lane	Name	Nationality	Time	Notes
1st place, gold medalist(s)	4	Raymond Martin	United States	16.99	
2nd place, silver medalist(s)	5	Yuki Oya	Japan	17.18	
3rd place, bronze medalist(s)	2	Leonardo De Jesus Perez Juarez	Mexico	17.44	PB
4	8	Sam McIntosh	Australia	17.82	
5	9	Beat Bösch	Switzerland	18.08	
6	6	Gianfranco Iannotta	United States	18.08	
7	7	Isaiah Rigo	United States	18.98	
8	3	Jerrold Mangliwan	Philippines	20.08	
