= Table tennis at the 2016 Summer Paralympics – Women's individual – Class 8 =

Table tennis at the XV Paralympic Games
- Venue: Riocentro Pavilion 3
- Dates: 8–12 September 2016
- Competitors: 7 from 6 nations

Medalists
1st place, gold medalist(s)		Mao Jingdian	China
2nd place, silver medalist(s)		Thu Kamkasomphou	France
3rd place, bronze medalist(s)		Josephine Medina	Philippines

The women's individual table tennis – Class 8 tournament at the 2016 Summer Paralympics in Rio de Janeiro took place during 8–12 September 2016 at Riocentro Pavilion 3. Classes 6–10 were for athletes with a physical impairment who competed from a standing position; the lower the number, the greater the impact the impairment was on an athlete’s ability to compete.

In the preliminary stage, athletes competed in two groups. Winners and runners-up of each group qualified to the semifinals.

== Results ==
Semifinals
A1	Thu Kamkasomphou (FRA)	11	11	11
B2	Josephine Medina (PHI)	5	8	9
A2	Juliane Wolf (GER)	7	11	7	8
B1	Mao Jingdian (CHN)	11	9	11	11

Final
A1	Thu Kamkasomphou (FRA)	6	8	3
B1	Mao Jingdian (CHN)	11	11	11
Bronze medal match
B2	Josephine Medina (PHI)	11	11	11
A2	Juliane Wolf (GER)	5	6	7

=== Preliminary round ===
Qualified for the semifinals

==== Group A ====
Athlete	Won	Lost	Games won	Points diff
Thu Kamkasomphou (FRA)	2	1	7	3
Juliane Wolf (GER)	2	1	6	3
Pan Mengyi (CHN)	1	2	6	3
Zsófia Arlóy (HUN)	1	2	4	3

8 September 2016

Thu Kamkasomphou (FRA)	9	7	12	5
Pan Mengyi (CHN)	11	11	10	11

8 September 2016

Juliane Wolf (GER)	11	11	8	13
Zsófia Arlóy (HUN)	5	7	11	11

8 September 2016

Pan Mengyi (CHN)	11	4	8	9
Zsofia Arlóy (HUN)	5	11	11	11

8 September 2016

Thu Kamkasomphou (FRA)	11	11	11
Juliane Wolf (GER)	7	9	9

9 September 2016

Thu Kamkasomphou (FRA)	11	11	12
Zsófia Arlóy (HUN)	2	5	10

9 September 2016

Juliane Wolf (GER)	7	11	11	8	11
Pan Mengyi (CHN)	11	2	5	11	7

==== Group B ====
Athlete	Won	Lost	Games won	Points diff
Mao Jingdian (CHN)	2	0	6	4
Josephine Medina (PHI)	1	1	3	1
Aida Dahlen (NOR)	0	2	2	1

8 September 2016

Mao Jingdian (CHN)	11	11	11
Josephine Medina (PHI)	3	4	6

8 September 2016

Mao Jingdian (CHN)	11	11	11
Aida Dahlen (NOR)	4	5	6

9 September 2016

Aida Dahlen (NOR)	5	11	11	2	8
Josephine Medina (PHI)	11	3	7	11	11
