= Table tennis at the 2024 Summer Paralympics – Women's doubles WD14 =

Women's doubles WD14 at the XVII Paralympic Games
- Venue: South Paris Arena 4, Paris
- Dates: 29 – 30 August 2024
- Competitors: 16 from 7 nations

Medalists
1st place, gold medalist(s)		Huang Wenjuan; Jin Yucheng	China
2nd place, silver medalist(s)		Stephanie Grebe; Juliane Wolf	Germany
3rd place, bronze medalist(s)		Aida Dahlen; Merethe Tveiten	Norway
3rd place, bronze medalist(s)		Felicity Pickard; Bly Twomey	Great Britain

The women's doubles – Class 14 table tennis tournament at the 2024 Summer Paralympics in Paris took place between 29 and 30 August 2024 at South Paris Arena 4.

== Schedule ==
The schedule are as below:

¼	Quarter-finals	½	Semi-finals	G	Gold medal match

Events	Dates			
Events	Thu 29 Aug		Fri 30 Aug	
Events	M	E	M	E
Women's doubles WD14	¼	½		G

== Results ==
Quarter-finals
1	Aida Dahlen (NOR); Merethe Tveiten (NOR)	11	11	11
8	Hagar Elsayed (EGY); Hanaa Hammad (EGY)	8	6	6
5	Morgen Caillaud (FRA); Lucie Hautière (FRA)	4	11	4	9
3	Stephanie Grebe (GER); Juliane Wolf (GER)	11	8	11	11
4	Huang Wenjuan (CHN); Jin Yucheng (CHN)	11	11	11	11
6	Maliak Alieva (NPA); Elena Litvinenko (NPA)	13	8	6	6
7	Nora Korneliussen (NOR); Jenny Helene Slettum (NOR)	10	9	3
2	Felicity Pickard (GBR); Bly Twomey (GBR)	12	11	11

Semi-finals
1	Aida Dahlen (NOR); Merethe Tveiten (NOR)	5	11	11	9	5
3	Stephanie Grebe (GER); Juliane Wolf (GER)	11	7	6	11	11
4	Huang Wenjuan (CHN); Jin Yucheng (CHN)	6	11	11	11
2	Felicity Pickard (GBR); Bly Twomey (GBR)	11	6	3	6

Gold medal match
3	Stephanie Grebe (GER); Juliane Wolf (GER)	4	11	8	8
4	Huang Wenjuan (CHN); Jin Yucheng (CHN)	11	9	11	11
