= Philippines at the 1988 Summer Paralympics =

- Flag of the Philippines
- IPC code: PHI

in Seoul
- Competitors: 4 in 2 sports
- Medals: Gold 0 Silver 0 Bronze 0 Total 0

Summer Paralympics appearances (overview)
- 1988; 1992; 1996; 2000; 2004; 2008; 2012; 2016; 2020; 2024

Philippines competed at the 1988 Summer Paralympics in Seoul, South Korea. 4 competitors from Philippines won no medals and so did not place in the medal table.

== Athletics ==
- Daniel Boldo
- Mauro Par
- Jolly Villota

== Swimming ==
Men

Athletes	Event	Heat		Final	
Athletes	Event	Time	Rank	Time	Rank
Leoncio Ochoa	100 m breaststroke 4	—N/a		2:56.11	8
Leoncio Ochoa	100 m backstroke 4	2:12.38	9	did not advance	
Leoncio Ochoa	100 m freestyle 4	—N/a		1:48.79	8

== See also ==
- Philippines at the Paralympics
- Philippines at the 1988 Summer Olympics
