= Powerlifting at the 2012 Summer Paralympics – Women's +82.5 kg =

Powerlifting – Women's +82.5 kg at the XIV Paralympic Games
- Venue: ExCeL London
- Date: 5 September 2012
- Competitors: 8 from 8 nations
- Winning lift: 162.0 kg

Medalists
1st place, gold medalist(s)		Grace Anozie	Nigeria
2nd place, silver medalist(s)		Heba Ahmed	Egypt
3rd place, bronze medalist(s)		Perla Bárcenas	Mexico

The women's +82.5 kg powerlifting event at the 2012 Summer Paralympics was contested on 5 September at ExCeL London.

== Records ==
Prior to the competition, the existing world and Paralympic records were as follows.

World record	168.0 kg	Grace Anozie (NGR)	Dubai, United Arab Emirates	25 February 2012
Paralympic record	165.0 kg	Grace Anozie (NGR)	Beijing, China	14 September 2008

== Results ==
Rank	Name	Body weight (kg)	Attempts (kg)				Result (kg)
Rank	Name	Body weight (kg)	1	2	3	4	Result (kg)
1st place, gold medalist(s)	Grace Anozie (NGR)	117.69	~~162.0~~	162.0	~~165.5~~	–	162.0
2nd place, silver medalist(s)	Heba Ahmed (EGY)	93.52	140.0	~~145.0~~	–	–	140.0
3rd place, bronze medalist(s)	Perla Bárcenas (MEX)	92.65	125.0	135.0	~~141.0~~	–	135.0
4	Mary Stack (USA)	102.41	129.0	~~134.0~~	~~137.0~~	–	129.0
5	Liudmila Hreben (BLR)	100.33	~~125.0~~	125.0	~~136.0~~	–	125.0
6	Adeline Ancheta (PHI)	101.59	~~120.0~~	120.0	~~129.0~~	–	120.0
7	Hyun-Jung Lee (KOR)	107.11	98.0	103.0	~~105.0~~	–	103.0
8	Emília Sládková (SVK)	107.17	90.0	~~96.0~~	~~99.0~~	–	90.0

Key: PR=Paralympic record; WR=World record; NMR=No marks recorded
