= Achelle Guion =

Filipino powerlifter (born 1971)

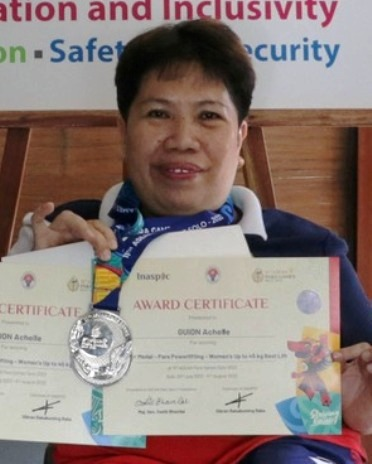
- Guion in 2022

Personal information
- Nickname: Jinky
- Nationality: Filipino
- Born: December 29, 1971 (age 54) Manila, Philippines

Sport
- Country: Philippines
- Sport: Powerlifting
- Event: -45 kg Category
Medal record
Representing Philippines
Women's powerlifting
Asian Para Games
Silver medal – second place	2010 Guangzhou	-45 kg
Silver medal – second place	2014 Incheon	-45 kg
Silver medal – second place	2018 Jakarta	-45 kg
ASEAN Para Games
Silver medal – second place	2022 Surakarta	-45 kg

Achelle Hofilena Guion (born December 29, 1971) is a Filipino powerlifter who has competed in the 2012 Summer Paralympics.

== Early life and education ==
Guion was born on December 29, 1971 in Manila, Philippines. She attended the Trinity University of Asia in Quezon City to pursue a course on business management and later worked as a production worker.

== Career ==
Guion started her powerlifting career in 2003. Her acquired impairment was caused by the effects of poliomyelitis. She was among the three powerlifters who represented the Philippines in the 2012 Summer Olympics in London along with Adeline Dumapong and Agustin Kitan. Guion herself competed in the women's -44kg event where she placed sixth among eight competitors by lifting 70 kilograms.

At the 2014 Asian Para Games in Incheon, Guion won a silver medal in the women's -45 kg event by lifting 70 kilograms and in the 2017 World Para Powerlifting Championships in Mexico City, Guion placed eight by lifting the same weight in the same weight category. She won another silver in the 2018 Asian Para Games in Jakarta in the women's -45 kg event behind China's Guo Lingling of China.

Guion qualified for the 2020 Summer Paralympics through a bi-partite invitation. However, she tested positive for COVID-19 amidst a pandemic of the disease, forcing her to withdraw from the games.
