= Yang Quanxi =

Chinese Paralympic powerlifter

Personal information
- Nationality: Chinese
- Born: 4 March 1982 Heze, China

Sport
- Sport: powerlifting
Medal record
Powerlifting
Representing China
Summer Paralympics
Bronze medal – third place	2012 London	Men's 60kg
Bronze medal – third place	2016 Rio de Janeiro	Men's 59 kg
Asian Para Games
Bronze medal – third place	2010 Guangzhou	Men's 52kg

Yang Quanxi (born 4 March 1982) is a Chinese powerlifter. He won the bronze medal at the Men's 59 kg event at the 2016 Summer Paralympics, with 176 kilograms.
