= Agustina Bantiloc =

Filipino para-archer (born 1979)

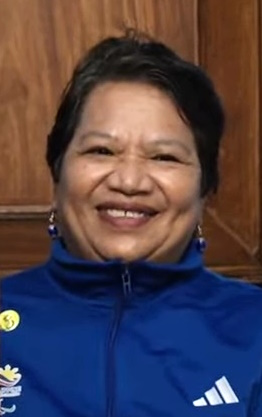
- Bantiloc in 2024

Personal information
- Full name: Agustina Maximo Bantiloc
- Born: August 8, 1968 (age 58)
- Home town: Baguio; Tanudan, Kalinga
- Years active: 2003–present

Sport
- Country: Philippines
- Sport: Para-archery; Powerlifting
Medal record
Representing Philippines
Mixed para archery
ASEAN Para Games
Bronze medal – third place	2019 Surakarta	Individual compound
Women's para archery
ASEAN Para Games
Bronze medal – third place	2011 Surakarta	Individual compound
Bronze medal – third place	2013 Naypyidaw	Individual compound
Bronze medal – third place	2025 Nakhon Ratchasima	Individual compound open
Bronze medal – third place	2025 Nakhon Ratchasima	Doubles compound open
Women's powerlifting
ASEAN Para Games
Bronze medal – third place	2003 Hanoi	Individual compound

Agustina Maximo Bantiloc (born August 8, 1968) is a Filipino para-archer. She is also formerly competed in powerlifting and para-athletics. She took part at the 2024 Summer Paralympics in Paris as a para-archer.

== Career ==
=== Archery ===
Bantiloc would first take up powerlifting in 2003, before shifting to para-archery in 2011. She would frequently train under John Hongitan, who is the national coach for the para-archery of the Philippines since that year. Archery coach Arthur Tampua would convince her of the switch.

She would represent the Philippines internationally and would play in the 2011 edition of the ASEAN Para Games. She would compete in 2014 edition. Bantiloc won two bronzes in that two iterations. She was to compete in the 2015 edition, but was disqualified over technicalities regarding the type of wheelchair she was using. At the 2019 ASEAN Para Games in Surakarta, Bantiloc would clinch a bronze with Marcel Burgos in the mixed compound event.

She also competed in the 2022 Asian Para Games in Hangzhou.

==== 2024 Summer Paralympics ====
Bantiloc would qualify for the 2024 Summer Paralympics in Paris via a bipartite invitation. She met the qualifying standard of 652 points at the 2022 Asian Para Games in Hangzhou. She would train under Jonathan Josol in preparation for the games in Paris. Bantiloc would be one of the flagbearers for the Philippines in the opening ceremony alongside swimmer Ernie Gawilan. Bantiloc is the oldest competitor of the delegation at 55 years old.

Bantiloc scored 618 in the open ranking round, her season best but placed last among 28 competitors pitting her against fifth seed Jane Karla Gögel of Brazil in the round of 32. Bantiloc ended her campaign after losing 127–143 to Gögel.

=== Powerlifting ===
Powerlifting is her first sport, taking it up in 2003. She debuted at the ASEAN Para Games as a powerlifter, winning a bronze in the 2003 edition in Vietnam.

She competed at the 2018 Philspada Para National Games.

== Personal life ==
Bantiloc has three children. She is associated with Baguio and Tanudan, Kalinga. She is a wheelchair user acquiring her disability at age six when she fractured her pelvic bone.
