= Wu Guojing =

Chinese Paralympic powerlifter

Sport
- Country: China
- Sport: Paralympic powerlifting
Medal record
Paralympic Games
Silver medal – second place	2004 Athens	52 kg
Gold medal – first place	2008 Beijing	52 kg

Wu Guojing is a Chinese Paralympic powerlifter. He represented China at the 2004 Summer Paralympics held in Athens, Greece and 2008 Summer Paralympics held in Beijing, China and he won two medals: the silver medal in the men's 52 kg event in 2004 and the gold medal in the men's 52 kg event in 2008.
