= Philippine National Para Games =

- Status: Active
- Genre: Multi-sport event
- Frequency: Annual (historical); Unclear (current)
- Location: Mostly in Metro Manila
- Country: Philippines
- Inaugurated: 2012; 14 years ago
- Organizer: Philippine Sports Commission; Philippine Paralympic Committee

The Philippine National Para Games (PNPG), formerly the PSC–PHILSPADA National Para Games, is the national games for parasports of the Philippines. It is organized by the Philippine Paralympic Committee (PPC) and is backed by state-agency Philippine Sports Commission (PSC).

The tournament serves as a basis for selection for athletes representing the Philippines in international tournaments such as the ASEAN Para Games, Asian Para Games and the Summer Paralympics.

== History ==
The National Para Games was established by the Philippine Sports Association for the Differently Abled (PHILSPADA; now the Philippine Paralympic Committee or PPC). PHILSPADA hosted its first national games in the Philippines in 2000 in Cebu.

However the first ever PSC–PHILSPADA National Para Games was held in 2012 in Marikina and is considered as the inaugural edition of the current national parasport games by the PPC which was still known as the PHILSPADA at that time. The next edition in 2013 was held in Santa Cruz, Laguna. However the third to fifth editions was held within Metro Manila; three of which in Marikina (2014, 2016, 2018) and one in the city of Manila (2015). The 2019 edition was held outside in Metro Manila again; in Malolos, Bulacan.

In 2016, PHILSPADA was renamed as the Philippine Paralympic Committee (PPC). However the national games continued to be referred to as the PSC–PHILSPADA National Para Games at least until the 2019 edition in Malolos.

However the national parasports games were put on hold due to the COVID-19 pandemic.

Efforts to revive the National Para Games were made after conditions improved. The games since the pandemic was originally planned to be held in Marikina was eventually organized starting 2024 in Manila. This also marks the first time that the competition now known simply as the Philippine National Para Games will feature athletes with dwarfism – after they were included in the Paralympic program.

== Editions ==
Edition	Year	Host	Ref.
1st	2012	Marikina, Metro Manila	
2nd	2013	Santa Cruz, Laguna	
3rd	2014	Marikina, Metro Manila	
4th	2015	Manila, Metro Manila	
5th	2016	Marikina, Metro Manila	
6th	2018	Marikina, Metro Manila	
7th	2019	Malolos, Bulacan	
8th	2024	Manila, Metro Manila	
