= Powerlifting at the 2008 Summer Paralympics – Women's +82.5 kg =

Powerlifting - Women's +82.5 kg at the XIII Paralympic Games
- Venue: Beihang University Gymnasium
- Date: 14 September 2008
- Competitors: 8 from 8 nations

Medalists
1st place, gold medalist(s)		Li Ruifang	China
2nd place, silver medalist(s)		Grace Ebere Anozie	Nigeria
3rd place, bronze medalist(s)		Nadia Mohamed Ali	Egypt

The women's +82.5 kg powerlifting event at the 2008 Summer Paralympics was contested on 14 September at the Beihang University Gymnasium in Beijing, China. This event was the heaviest of the women's powerlifting weight classes, allowing competitors with over 82.5 kilograms (181.9 lb) of body mass.

As with all Paralympic powerlifting events, lifters competed in the bench press. Each athlete was allowed three attempts to bench press as much weight as possible. Athletes attempting to break a record were allowed a fourth attempt. For the attempt to be valid, the competitor must have lowered the weighted bar to her chest, held it motionless for a moment, then pressed the bar upwards until her arms were fully extended. If the competitor failed to meet these requirements or any other rule infraction was committed, the attempt was declared invalid by a team of three referees and the result struck from the record.

== Results ==
Rank	Name	Body weight (kg)	Attempts (kg)				Result (kg)
Rank	Name	Body weight (kg)	1	2	3	4	Result (kg)
1st place, gold medalist(s)	Li Ruifang (CHN)	104.77	160.0	165.0 =PR	~~167.5~~	–	165.0
2nd place, silver medalist(s)	Grace Ebere Anozie (NGR)	110.77	157.5	165.0 PR	~~167.5~~	–	165.0
3rd place, bronze medalist(s)	Nadia Mohamed Ali (EGY)	93.87	150.0	~~157.5~~	~~157.5~~	–	150.0
4	Deahnne McIntyre (AUS)	117.55	122.5	~~127.5~~	127.5	–	127.5
5	Tetyana Frolova (UKR)	107.32	115.0	120.0	~~122.5~~	–	120.0
6	Kamilla Rusielewicz (POL)	99.63	105.0	110.0	115.0	–	115.0
7	Corina Viorica Custura (ROU)	106.93	90.0	95.0	~~100.0~~	–	95.0
–	Adeline Dumapong-Ancheta (PHI)	–	–	–	–	–	DNS

Key: PR=Paralympic record; DNS=Did not start
