= Bly Twomey =

British para table tennis player

Personal information
- Born: 27 April 2010 (age 16)
- Home town: Brighton, England

Sport
- Sport: Para table tennis
- Disability class: C7
Medal record
Women's para table tennis
Representing Great Britain
Paralympic Games
Bronze medal – third place	2024 Paris	Singles WS7
Bronze medal – third place	2024 Paris	Doubles WD14

Bly Twomey (born 27 April 2010), is a British para table tennis player. She represented Great Britain at the 2024 Summer Paralympics.

== Career ==
Twomey made her international debut in March 2023 at the Costa Brava Spanish Para Open.

Twomey represented Great Britain at the 2024 Summer Paralympics in the women's doubles WD14 event, along with Felicity Pickard, and won a bronze medal. She also won a bronze medal in the women's singles WD14 event at the same championship. At 14 years old, she became Great Britain's youngest medalist in table tennis.
