= Philippines at the 1992 Paralympic Games for Persons with Mental Handicap =

- Flag of the Philippines
- IPC code: PHI

in Madrid
- Medals: Gold 0 Silver 0 Bronze 0 Total 0

Summer appearances
- 1988; 1992; 1996; 2000; 2004; 2008; 2012; 2016; 2020; 2024

The Philippines participated in the Paralympic Games for Persons with Mental Handicap which was held in Madrid. The games followed the 1992 Summer Paralympics in Barcelona, in which the Philippines did not compete in. The Philippines sent a 20-people delegation to the Paralympic Games for Persons with Mental Handicap and its competitors competed at least in athletics and swimming.

== Athletics ==
The Philippines sent competitors in athletics.

Athlete	Events	Heat		Semifinal		Final	
Athlete	Events	Time	Rank	Time	Rank	Time	Rank
Alejandro Valles	100m	?				Did not advance	
Alejandro Valles	400m	Unknown (Non-podium result)					
Alejandro Valles	1500m	Unknown (Non-podium result)					
Alejandro Valles	4 × 100 m relay	Unknown (Non-podium result)					
No information for other competitors

== See also ==
- Philippines at the 1992 Summer Olympics
