= Felicity Pickard =

British para table tennis player

Fliss Pickard
Personal information
- Full name: Felicity Pickard
- Born: 17 July 1994 (age 31) Wordsley, England

Sport
- Sport: Para table tennis
- Disability class: Class 6
Medal record
Para table tennis
Representing Great Britain
Paralympic Games
Bronze medal – third place	2024 Paris	Women's doubles WD14

Felicity Pickard (born 17 July 1994) is a British para table tennis player. She represented Great Britain at the 2024 Summer Paralympics.

== Career ==
Pickard represented Great Britain at the 2024 Summer Paralympics in the women's doubles WD14 event, along with Bly Twomey, and won a bronze medal.
