= Andres Lubin =

Philippines Paralympic athlete

Personal information
- Born: 1970 or 1971 (age 54–55) Baguio, Philippines

Sport
- Country: Philippines
- Sport: Para-athletics
- Disability class: F57
Medal record
Men's para athletics
Representing Philippines
FESPIC Games
Silver medal – second place	1999 Bangkok	Javelin
Bronze medal – third place	1999 Bangkok	Discus

Andres Lubin (born 1970 or 1971) is a para-athlete who competed for the Philippines at the 2000 Summer Paralympics in Sydney.

Born in Baguio and a wheelchair athlete, Lubin also competed in the 1999 FESPIC Games in Bangkok, where he won silver in the javelin throw and bronze in the discus throw.

At the 2000 Summer Paralympics he took part in the men's javelin F57 event. Lubin was supposed to compete in the F54 classification but he was deemed ineligible after a test by the Linggo ng Games Medical Committee conclude that his left leg and abdominal muscle are still functional. To compete in the F54 both of his legs should not be functional. As of 2000, he also worked as a data encoder at the head office of Philippine Savings Bank.
