= Narong Kasanun =

Thai Paralympian

Personal information
- Nationality: Thai

Sport
- Country: Thailand
- Sport: Powerlifting
Medal record
Paralympic Games
Silver medal – second place	2008 Beijing	52 kg

Narong Kasanun is a Thai powerlifter. He has competed at four Paralympic Games from 2008 to 2020, winning bronze in 2008 in the men's 52kg category.
