= Ebere Onwudiwe =

Nigerian political scientist (1952–2021)

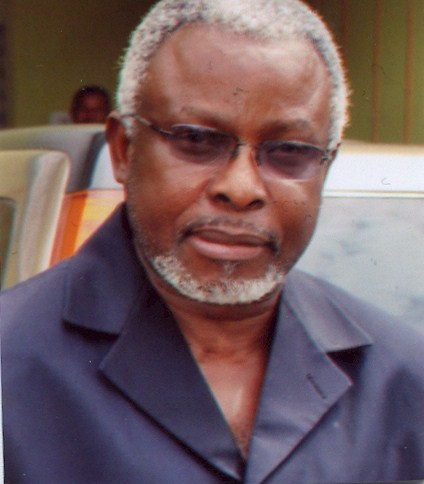
- Born: October 10, 1952 (68); Isu-Njaba, Nigeria
- Died: January 9, 2021; Abuja, Nigeria
- Occupations: Economist, political scientist

Ebere Onwudiwe was a Nigerian political scientist and economist. He was the CEO of the O-analytics Research and Development Initiative.

== Biography ==
Ebere Onwudiwe was born in the ancient town of Isu-Njaba in the old Owerri province of Eastern Nigeria to loving Catholic parents, Mazi Simon Onwudiwe Achigaonye and Magdalene Nwamgbede (Memme) Achigaonye. He spent some of his childhood with his uncle in Port Harcourt, Rivers State, and in Aba, Abia State where he attended Sacred Heart College, a Catholic secondary school. He left in class 2 as the Nigerian Civil War began in 1967 and joined the Biafran Airforce over a year later (Regimental Wing) serving at the Uli Airport. At the end of the war, he completed his secondary school. He died on January 9, 2021.

Onwudiwe was educated at the American College of Switzerland, 1979 and University of Science and Arts, 1980. He received an M.Sc. (Econs), M.A. (Int'l Relations) and Ph.D. in (Pol. Sci.) from Florida State University, Tallahassee.

He taught political science and economics at Central State University, Wilberforce, Ohio where he was at different times director of the National Resource Centre for African Studies, and the executive director of the Centre for International Studies. He has also been a visiting professor at the Ohio State University, Columbus, Ohio; Antioch College, Yellow Springs and the United Nations University of Peace, Costa Rica.

== Professional career ==
Onwudiwe was a Distinguished Fellow at the Centre for Democracy and Development, Abuja, and served as a member of the Governing Council of Igbinedion University, Okada, Edo State and a member of the Board of Ojukwu Center, Owerri, Imo State. He also served on the Board of Economic Advisers to the Office of the Adviser on Economic Matters to the President of Nigeria.

Onwudiwe was a governance consultant with the United Nations Economic Commission for Africa in Addis Ababa, Ethiopia, and was a co-writer of the 2007 African Governance Report recently published by the Oxford University Press. He served in national committees of the Federal Government of Nigeria and the Government of the Federal Capital Territory. He was a consultant to the Federal government-constituted Technical Committee on the Niger Delta.

He was a popular columnist for the Nigerian newspapers Newswatch and Business Day. His articles appeared in major Nigerian newspapers and in international media, including The Christian Science Monitor, The New York Times, International Herald Tribune, The Congressional Record, The United States Institute of Peace, US Senate, the Los Angeles Times, and The Guardian (Nigeria) where he is a regular contributor

=== Television Host ===
In 2013 Onwudiwe hosted his own show "The Conference" on Nigerian Television Authority (NTA), the show was also available internationally on Nigerian Television Authority International (NTAi). On the show he discussed important domestic issues with various stakeholders in Nigerian civil society and government.

== International Journal of African Studies ==
He revived the Journal of Human Relations changed its name to The International Journal of African Studies (IJAS), and became its editor from 1997 to 2007. The now-defunct IJAS has published over 100 peer-reviewed articles, 90 percent of them written by African academics whose scholarship often rarely make it into mainstream Eurocentric journals.

== Afro-Optimism ==
Onwudiwe expounded on the understanding of Afro-optimism and its implication to development discuss in his signature work 'Afro-Optimism: Perspectives on Africa's Advances', which he co-edited with Minabere Ibelema. The view that Africa regressed the moment that colonial governments left its shores is widespread. This volume is a counterpoint to the orthodoxy. Here 13 scholars with specializations ranging from literature and history to philosophy and economics argue that Africa has advanced since colonialism and is poised to march forward in spite of setbacks and disappointments. The contributors to the book contend that development is about human beings, so they do not rely exclusively on statistical estimates and projections.

Afro-Optimism is a book with a simple thesis: Africa is marching forward, even if at times haltingly and at a different pace from the rest of the world. A common view among journalists and academics alike is that African conditions declined the moment colonial governments left its shores. The chapters in this book cover Africa's progress in health, agriculture, transportation, cultural innovation, and economic advancement. The contributors to the book contend that development is about human beings, so they do not rely exclusively on statistical estimates and projections. The essays in this book discuss the advances African states have made in spite of, and at times because of, their experiences of European colonial rule. The contributors argue that in all facets of development, Africans had to overcome colonial obstacles or had to build on meager colonial foundations. Although the authors acknowledge Africa's disappointing performance in various respects, they stress throughout that exclusive concentration on African failures creates new and reinforces existing negative perceptions of contemporary Africa.

A review from African Studies Review stated - "Given the difficulty of their mission, the editors and contributors do a fairly good job in managing, against the odds, to create a reasonable space for measured hope against formulations of Afro-pessimism."

== Publications ==
Notable books are:

- (co-edited with Minabere Ibelema) Afro-Optimism: Perspectives on Africa's Advances Westport, Conn. : Praeger, 2003. ISBN 0-275-97586-X According to WorldCat, the book is held in 682 libraries
- (co-edited with Adigun A B Agbaje & Larry Jay Diamond) Nigeria's Struggle for Democracy and Good Governance Ibadan, Nigeria : Ibadan University Press, 2004 ISBN 978-9781214004
  - Review, by Rita Kiki Edozie, African Studies Review, v49 n1 (Apr. 2006): 182–183
- (co-edited with Eghosa E Osaghae) The Management of the National Question in Nigeria Igbenedion University Press, 2001 ISBN 9789783420397
- (co-edited with Rotimi T Suberu) Nigerian Federalism in Crisis: Critical Perspectives and Political Option.Ibadan : Programme on Ethnic and Federal Studies, Department of Political Science, University of Ibadan, 2005 ISBN 9789783642133

Most popular journal articles:

- "Africa's Other Story" Current History 101, no. 655, (2002): 225
- "How Oil Put Africa Back on the Map" Transition, n99 (2008): 148–152
- (with Minabere Ibelema; Mathurin C Houngnikpo) "Review Essays – Africa Between Despair and Hope – Afro-Optimism: Perspectives on Africa's Advances" African studies review. 47, no. 2, (2004): 131
- A Critique of Recent Writings on Ethnicity and Nationalism Research in African Literatures, v32 n3 (Autumn, 2001): 213–228
- (with Apollos O. Nwauwa) "Between Tradition and Change: Sociopolitical and Economic Transformation Among the Igbo of Nigeria" Glassboro, N.J. : Goldline & Jacobs Pub., 2012 ISBN 9789784949873
- "On the Sovereign National Conference" Issue: A Journal of Opinion, v27 n1 (1999): 66–68
- (with Chloe Berwind-Dart) "Breaking the Cycle of Electoral Violence in Nigeria" "Breaking the Cycle of Electoral Violence in Nigeria". United States Institute of Peace. Archived from the original on 8 January 2011.
- Between Tradition and Change: Sociopolitical and Economic Transformation Among the Igbo of Nigeria Glassboro, N.J. : Goldline & Jacobs Pub., 2012 ISBN 9789784949873
