= Juliane Wolf =

German para table tennis player

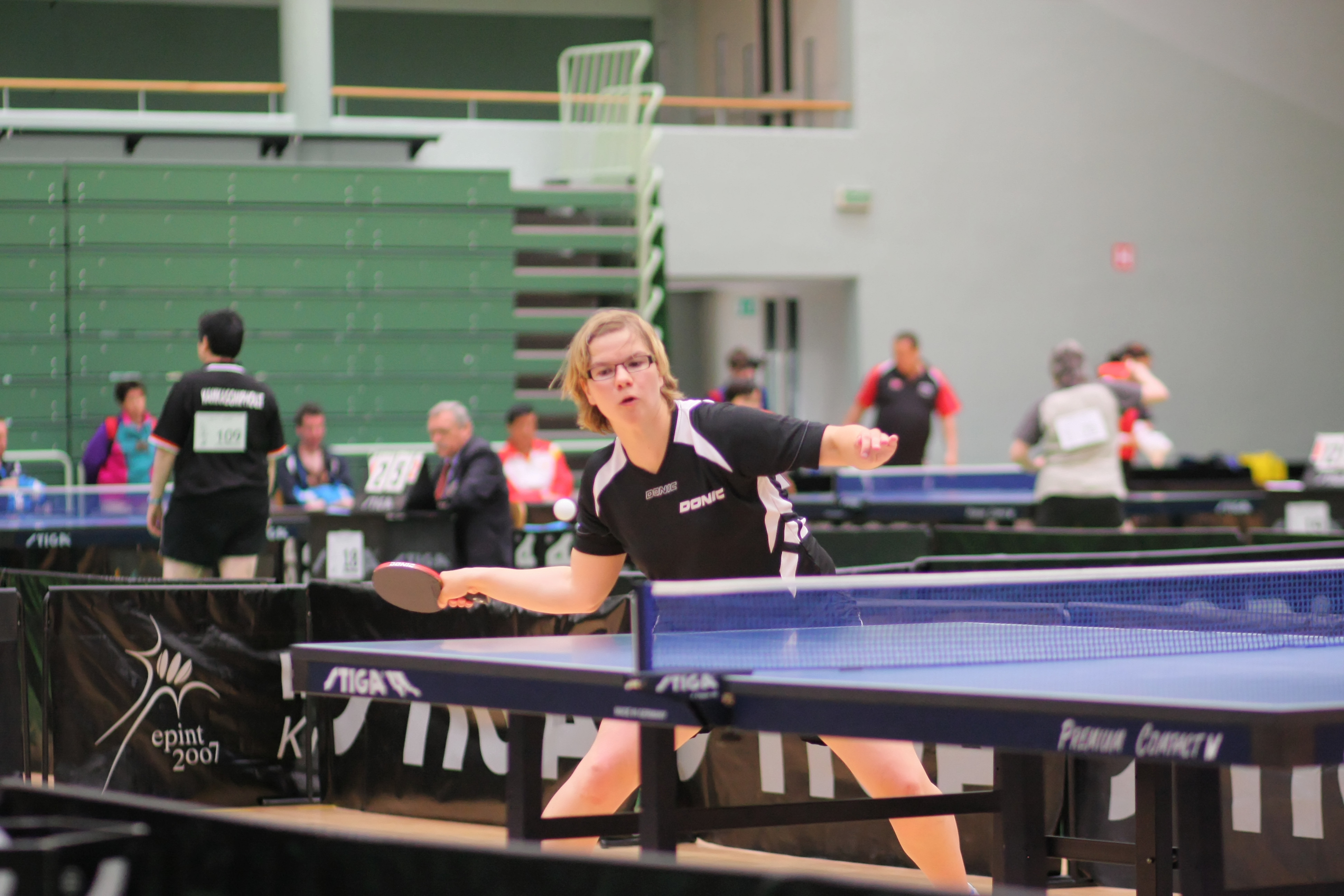
- at the Slovenia Open, 2011

Personal information
- Nickname: Jule
- Born: 26 February 1988 (age 38) Eisenhüttenstadt, Germany
- Height: 175 cm (5 ft 9 in)

Sport
- Country: Germany
- Sport: Para table tennis
- Disability: Cerebral palsy
- Disability class: C8
- Club: BSG Offenburg
- Coached by: Oliver Weber
Medal record
Para table tennis
Representing Germany
Paralympic Games
Silver medal – second place	2024 Paris	Doubles WD14
Bronze medal – third place	2024 Paris	Singles C8
World Championships
Silver medal – second place	2014 Beijing	Women's teams C6-8
Bronze medal – third place	2014 Beijing	Women's singles C8
European Championships
Gold medal – first place	2017 Lasko	Women's teams C6-8
Silver medal – second place	2011 Split	Women's singles C8
Silver medal – second place	2015 Vejle	Women's singles C8
Silver medal – second place	2015 Vejle	Women's teams C6-8
Silver medal – second place	2017 Lasko	Women's singles C8
Silver medal – second place	2019 Helsingborg	Women's teams C6-8
Bronze medal – third place	2011 Split	Women's teams C8

Juliane Wolf (born 26 February 1988) is a German para table tennis player who competes in international level events. She is a double World silver medalist and seven time European medalist. She competed at the 2016 Summer Paralympics where she lost in the bronze medal match to Josephine Medina.
