= Grace Anozie =

Nigerian Paralympic powerlifter

Personal information
- Full name: Grace Ebere Anozie
- Born: 16 July 1977 (age 48) Enugu, Nigeria
Medal record
Paralympic powerlifting
Representing Nigeria
Paralympic Games
Gold medal – first place	2012 London	+82.5 kg
Silver medal – second place	2008 Beijing	+82.5 kg
Bronze medal – third place	2004 Athens	+82.5 kg

Grace Ebere Anozie MON (born 16 July 1977) is a Nigerian Paralympian in powerlifting. Anozie's first Paralympic medal was a bronze at the 2004 Summer Paralympics in the 82.5 kg event. At subsequent Paralympics, Anozie won a silver medal in 2008 and gold in 2012. During her career, Anozie set a Paralympic record at the 2008 Summer Paralympics in the over 86 kg event. At the 2012 Fazza International Powerlifting Championships, Anozie broke the record for most weight by a woman Paralympian in the over 82.5 kg event with 168 kilograms. After the 2012 Summer Paralympics, Anozie became a Member of the Order of the Niger.

== Early life and education ==
Anozie became paralyzed from polio when she was two years old. She completed a university accounting program in 1998 but changed her career to sports when she could not find a job.

== Career ==
Anozie started powerlifting in 1998 and medalled in multiple Paralympic Games. In powerlifting, she was fourth in the 82.5 kg event at the 2000 Summer Paralympics. Changing to the over 82.5 kg event, Anozie won a bronze at the 2004 Summer Paralympics. She later won a silver at the 2008 Summer Paralympics and a gold at the 2012 Summer Paralympics. Prior to the 2012 Paralympics, Anozie had considered ending her powerlifting career due to her previous Paralympic medal performances. After the 2012 event, Anozie decided to take time off from powerlifting for a year before determining if she would compete at the 2016 Summer Paralympics. Outside of the Paralympics, Anozie won gold at the 2013 Powerlifting Asian Open Championships.

During her career, Anozie has held world records in powerlifting. At the Beijing Paralympics in 2008, she broke the Paralympic record in the over 82.5 kg powerlifting event. Later on, Anozie set the world record in the over 82.5 kg category during the 2012 Fazza International Powerlifting Championships. With 168 kilograms, Anozie set a Guinness World Record for the most weight lifted by a woman Paralympian in the over 82.5 kilograms category for powerlifting. The year later, she held the world record in the over 86 kg event at the 2013 Asian Open Championship, which was later broken by Precious Orji.

== Awards and achievements ==
Anozie was nominated for the International Paralympic Committee's athlete of the month in March 2012. Following the 2012 Summer Paralympics, Anozie became a Member of the Order of the Niger that year alongside her teammates that won gold at the Paralympics. At the end of 2012, Anozie was named Sportswoman of the Year by The Nation for Nigeria.

== Personal life ==
Anozie lived in Benin, Edo State, Nigeria before moving to the United States in 2014. She originally planned to visit Chicago for training tour for 2014 Commonwealth Games but ended up living in Shreveport, Louisiana after a conflict with her trainer.
