= Michael Barredo =

Filipino sports executive

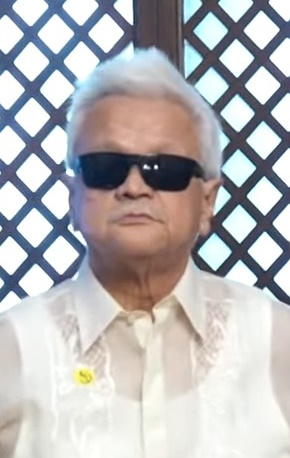
- Barredo in 2024

5th President of the International Blind Sports Federation
- In office June 2005 – August 2013
- Preceded by: Enrique Perrez
- Succeeded by: Jannie Hammershoi

1st President of the Paralympic Committee of the Philippines
- Incumbent
- Assumed office 1997
- Preceded by: Office created

Personal details
- Spouse: Barbara Barredo
- Children: 2

Michael I. Barredo is a Filipino sports executive who has served as the 5th president of the International Blind Sports Federation and the founding president of the Paralympic Committee of the Philippines.

== Career ==
=== Paralympic Committee of the Philippines ===
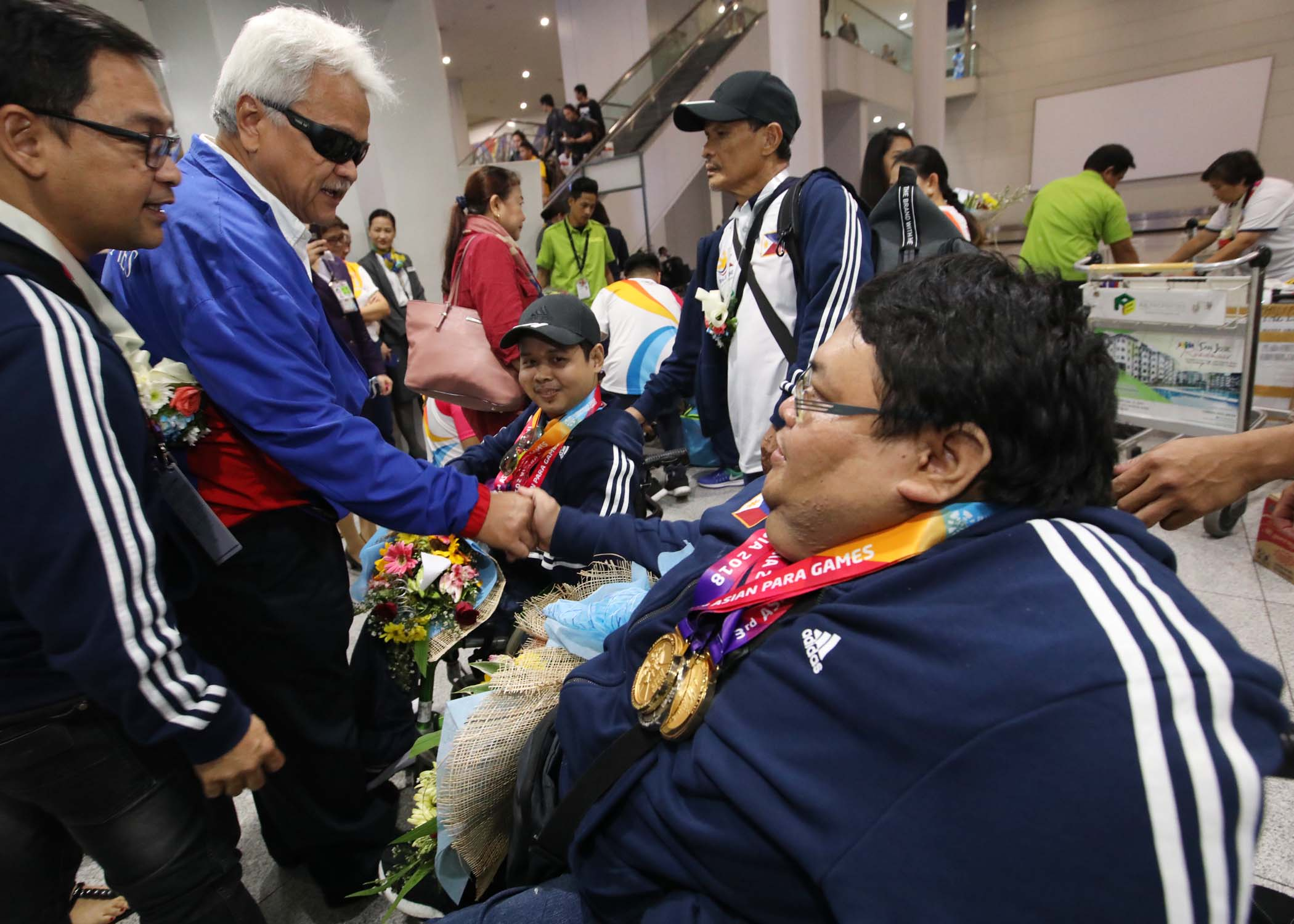
Barredo (left; wearing sunglasses) congratulating chess players Henry Lopez (right) and Sander Severino (center) who won gold medals at the 2018 Asian Para Games

Mike Barredo, a blind man himself, organized the Philippine Sports Association for the Differently Abled (PhilSPADA) in 1997, which became the National Paralympic Committee for the Philippines. He is part of the organization, which was later renamed as the Paralympic Committee of the Philippines (PPC), as its founding president.

As president of the disabled sports organization he campaigned for the amendment of National Athletes, Coaches and Trainers Benefits and Incentives Act of 2001 (Republic Act 9064) so that the government be legally obliged to give incentives to athletes competing in disabled sports, especially the Paralympics. The 2001 legislation was replaced by the National Athletes and Coaches Benefits and Incentives Act of 2015 (Republic Act. 10699) which recognized para-athletes as national athletes, although incentives for para-athletes amount to half of incentives for their able-bodied counterparts. Barredo failed in his lobbying efforts to have mandatory incentives for eligible para-athletes be equal to their non-disabled counterparts.

He has also overseen the participation of the Philippines in six editions of the Summer Paralympics.

=== Other ===
Barredo was the 5th president of the International Blind Sports Federation (IBSA) from June 2005 to August 2013. In November 2013, he was conferred the Paralympic Order for his former role with IBSA. He is the first Filipino to receive the distinction.

He has also served as a commissioner of the Philippine Sports Commission under the chairmanship of Eric Buhain in the early 2000s prior to becoming IBSA president in 2005. He was also a founding board member of the Asean Para Sports Federation and a founding board member and vice president of the Asian Paralympic Council (now the Asian Paralympic Committee).

== Personal life ==
Barredo is blind, having loss his eyesight in a vehicular accident in 1979. Prior to the accident, he was a student-athlete of De La Salle University playing in football, volleyball, basketball, track and field and chess. He is married to Barbara Barredo with whom he has two sons. Outside of sport, he is a businessman who founded his own insurance agency, a trucking business, and has been an executive of a car dealership.
