= Andy Avellana =

Filipino paratriathlete and high jumper

Sport
- Country: Philippines
- Sport: Para-athletics; Paratriathlon
- Disability class: F42 (parathletics); PT2 (paratriathlon)
- Event: High jump

Andy Avellana is a Filipino paratriathlete. He also competed in athletics at the 2012 Summer Paralympics in London.

Avellana has an acquired disability, having lost his left leg due to a bus accident at age 14. Prior to the accident, he aspired to be a boxer. He took up para-athletics, particularly high jump, in 2006 since he wanted to continue his sporting career. He also trained in paraswimming and wheelchair racing.

Avellana finished 6th among 7 competitors in the F42 class men's high jump at the 2012 Summer Paralympics in London After his Paralympics stint, Avellana took up paratriathlon in the same year. In 2013, he became the first Filipino to win a gold medal in a para-triathlon international race.
