= Allain Ganapin =

Filipino taekwondo para-athlete

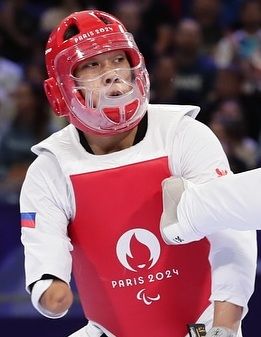
- Ganapin at the 2024 Summer Paralympics

Personal information
- Full name: Allain Keanu Ganapin
- Born: July 7, 1998 (age 27)
- Home town: Marikina, Philippines

Sport
- Country: Philippines
- Sport: Para Taekwondo
- Disability class: K44
- Weight class: –80 kg

Allain Keanu Ganapin (born July 7, 1998) is a Filipino taekwondo para-athlete.

== Background ==
A native of Marikina, Ganapin's right arm is amputated up to his elbow due to a congenital disorder. He took up taekwondo as a response against bullying upon the suggestion of his high school best friend who was concerned of his situation. His coach Crisanto Angeles, likewise encouraged him to take up taekwondo. In his early taekwondo career, Ganapin competed against athletes without disabilities.

Ganapin has been part of the Philippine national team since 2015. He took part in the 2017 Oceania Para Taekwondo Open in Auckland, New Zealand where he won a bronze medal.

He qualified for the 2020 Summer Paralympics in Tokyo, Japan, which was postponed by a year due to the COVID-19 pandemic. He joined the Asian Qualification Tournament in Amman, Jordan in May 2021, where he won a bronze in the men's K44 -75 kg division but failed to qualify since only the winner gains a berth to the Paralympics. He later qualified in June 2021 through a bipartite invitation. He is the first Filipino to qualify for taekwondo, a sport which made its debut in Tokyo. As part of his preparation, Ganapin trained with 2020 Summer Olympian Kurt Barbosa. However he was unable to compete because he tested positive for COVID-19.

On March 17, 2024, Ganapin became the country's third representative in the 2024 Summer Paralympics alongside swimmers Ernie Gawilan and Angel Otom. He defeated Sandeep Singh Maan in K44 men's - 80 kg clash at the Asian Qualifying Tournament in China.

He was able to compete in his second Summer Paralympics he qualified for. In Paris, Ganapin won his first bout over Hadi Hassanzada of the Refugee Paralympic Team before ending his Olympic campaign to Abulfaz Abuzarli of Azerbaijan
