= Aida Dahlen =

Norwegian para table tennis player

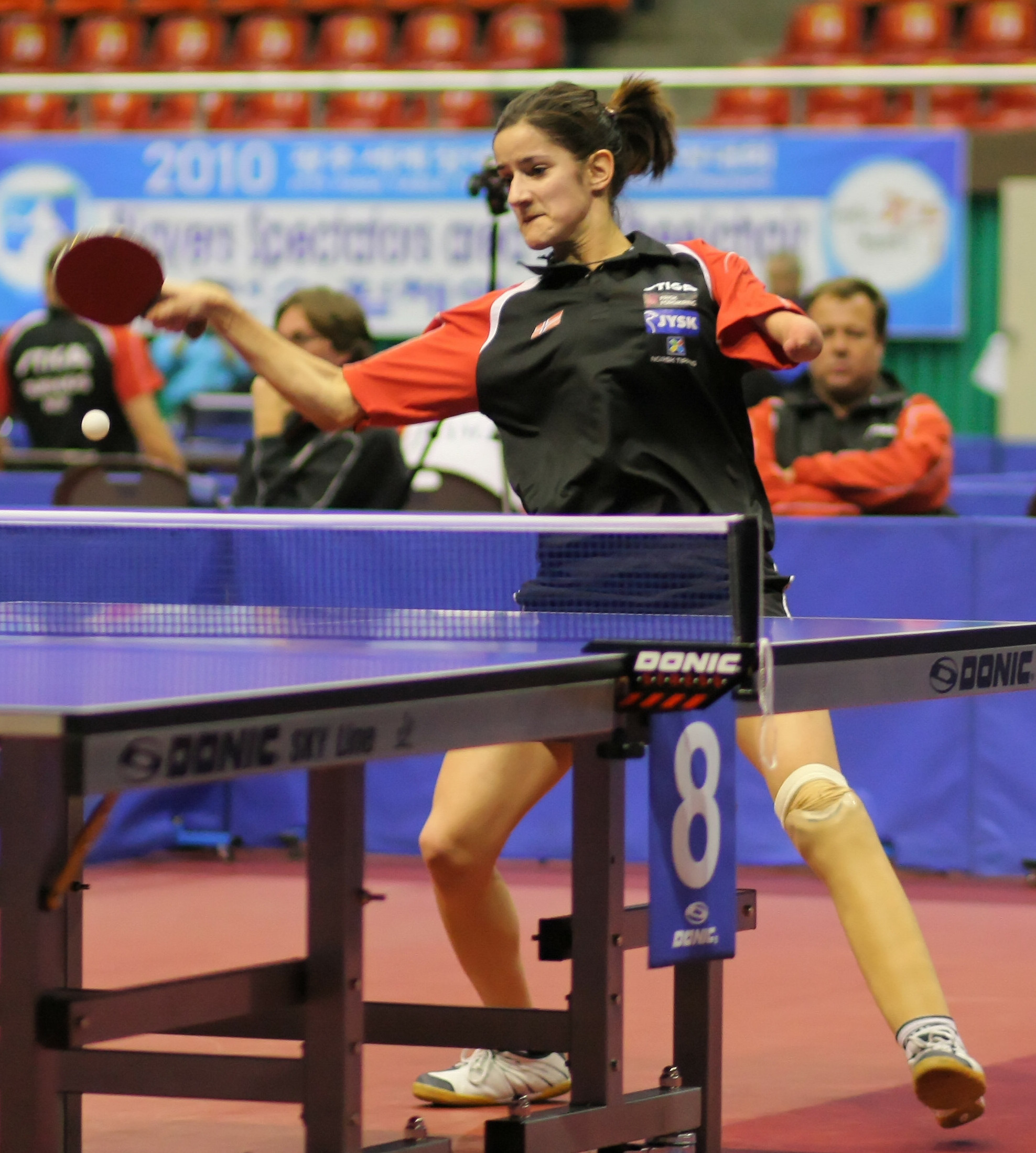
- Dahlen in 2010

Personal information
- Full name: Aida Husić Dahlen
- Nationality: Norwegian
- Born: 5 October 1990 (age 35) Sarajevo, SR Bosnia and Herzegovina, SFR Yugoslavia
- Height: 170 cm (5 ft 7 in)

Sport
- Country: Norway
- Sport: Para table tennis
- Disability class: Class 8
- Club: Randesund IL
Medal record
Para table tennis
Representing Norway
Paralympic Games
Silver medal – second place	2024 Paris	Singles C8
Bronze medal – third place	2020 Tokyo	Singles C8
Bronze medal – third place	2024 Paris	Doubles WD14
World Championships
Silver medal – second place	2014 Beijing	Singles C8
Silver medal – second place	2022 Granada	Singles C8
Bronze medal – third place	2018 Laško	Singles C8
European Championships
Gold medal – first place	2015 Vejle	Singles C8
Gold medal – first place	2017 Laško	Singles C8
Gold medal – first place	2023 Sheffield	Singles C8
Gold medal – first place	2023 Sheffield	Doubles WD14
Silver medal – second place	2013 Lignano	Singles C8
Bronze medal – third place	2011 Split	Singles C8
Bronze medal – third place	2017 Laško	Teams C6-8
Bronze medal – third place	2019 Helsingborg	Singles C8
Bronze medal – third place	2019 Helsingborg	Teams C6-8

Aida Husić Dahlen (born 5 October 1990) is a Norwegian para table tennis player, currently ranked world number one in women's sports class 8. Dahlen is a Paralympic silver and two-time bronze medallist, two-time World Championships silver medallist and a bronze medallist, and four-time European champion. She won the silver medal in the individual class 8 event and a bronze medal in the doubles class 14 event at the 2024 Summer Paralympics, and a bronze medal in the individual class 8 event at the 2020 Summer Paralympics. Dahlen is a four-time Paralympian and made her Paralympics debut at the 2012 Summer Paralympics.

== Life ==
Dahlen was born on 5 October 1990 in Sarajevo, before the outbreak of the Bosnian War. She was born without a left forearm and lower left leg. Dahlen was adopted by Norwegian parents at the age of six.

She took up table tennis at the age of 12 after being encouraged by a friend, and first competed internationally in 2008 at the age of 18.
