= Jerrold Mangliwan =

Filipino wheelchair racer (born 1979)

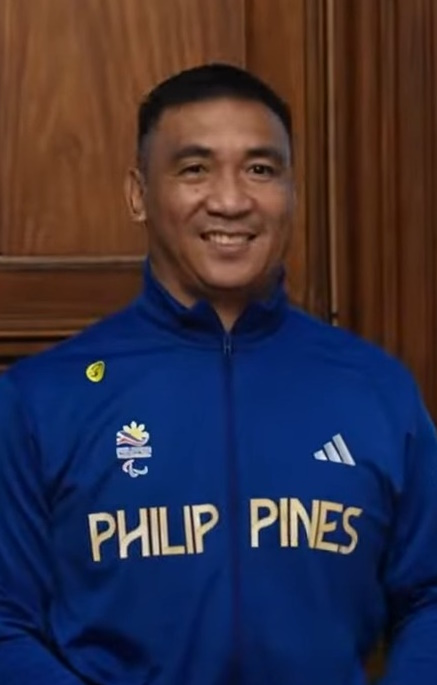
- Mangliwan in 2024

Personal information
- Born: Jerrold Pete Macabio Mangliwan; 17 October 1979 (age 46) Tabuk, Kalinga-Apayao, Philippines
- Education: Trinity University of Asia
- Years active: 2009–present

Sport
- Country: Philippines
- Sport: Wheelchair racing
- Disability: Paraplegia
- Disability class: T52
Medal record
Men's para athletics
Representing Philippines
Event	1st	2nd	3rd
Asian Para Games	1	1	0
ASEAN Para Games	6	1	0
Total	7	2	0
Asian Para Games
Gold medal – first place	2022 Hangzhou	400m T52
Silver medal – second place	2022 Hangzhou	100m T52
ASEAN Para Games
Gold medal – first place	2023 Cambodia	200m T52
Gold medal – first place	2023 Cambodia	400m T52
Gold medal – first place	2022 Surakarta	100m T52
Gold medal – first place	2022 Surakarta	400m T52
Gold medal – first place	2015 Singapore	200m T52
Gold medal – first place	2015 Singapore	100m T52
Silver medal – second place	2025 Nakhon Ratchasima	800m T52
Silver medal – second place	2025 Nakhon Ratchasima	400m T52
Silver medal – second place	2025 Nakhon Ratchasima	100m T52
Silver medal – second place	2015 Singapore	400m T52

Jerrold Pete Macabio Mangliwan (born 17 October 1979) is a Filipino wheelchair racer who is a two-time Paralympian for the Philippines who competed in the 2016 and 2020 editions. In wheelchair racing, he competes in the T52 classification.

== Early life and education ==
Jerrold Pete Mangliwan was born on October 17, 1979 in Tabuk which was then part of the Kalinga-Apayao province. He contracted polio when he was two years old which rendered him paraplegiac.

He studied at the Christian Learning Center and Saint Theresita's School Lubuagan for his secondary education. He moved to Metro Manila to attend the Trinity University of Asia in Quezon City to pursue his collegiate studies. He graduated with a degree in mass communication.

== Career ==
Mangliwan became a para-athlete when he was in college. He took up the sport of wheelchair racing in 2009 upon the encouragement of a friend. Within the past four years, he has tried other sports such as wheelchair basketball and sailing but found more success as a wheelchair racer.

Mangliwan with his friend would wheelchair race from Montalban to Cubao. He would secure a place in the Philippine national team. He also had to deal with transporting his wheelchair from Caloocan where he is residing with his sibling to the PhilSports Arena in Pasig.

He would first compete for his country at the 2009 ASEAN Para Games in Kuala Lumpur. At the 2015 edition in Singapore, he won gold medals at the 100m and 200m T52 race, and a silver in the 400m T52 race. In 2023 in Cambodia, he won two golds in the 200m and 400m T52 races.

Mangliwan is a two-time Paralympian, having competed in the 2016 Summer Paralympics in Rio de Janeiro and the 2020 Summer Paralympics in Tokyo. He was the flagbearer for the Philippines for the latter.

Mangliwan has also competed in the Asian Para Games four times. He would accomplish his first podium finish in the 2022 edition in Hangzhou, China by clinching the silver medal at the 100m T52 race. This was followed by a gold in the 400m race.
