= Josephine Medina =

Filipino Paralympic table tennis player (1970–2021)

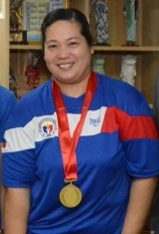
- Medina in 2016

Personal information
- Full name: Josephine Rebeta Medina
- Nationality: Filipino
- Born: March 20, 1970
- Died: September 2, 2021 (aged 51)

Sport
- Country: Philippines
- Sport: Para table tennis
Medal record
Table tennis
Representing Philippines
Event	1st	2nd	3rd
Paralympic Games	-	-	1
Asian Para Games	-	2	1
ASEAN Para Games	7	1	2
Total	7	3	4
Paralympic Games
Bronze medal – third place	2016 Rio de Janeiro	Singles class 8
Asian Para Games
Silver medal – second place	2018 Jakarta	Singles class TT 8
Silver medal – second place	2010 Guangzhou	Singles class 6–8
Bronze medal – third place	2014 Incheon	Singles class TT 8
ASEAN Para Games
Gold medal – first place	2008 Nakhon Ratchasima	Singles class 8
Gold medal – first place	2008 Nakhon Ratchasima	Singles class 6–10
Gold medal – first place	2008 Nakhon Ratchasima	Doubles open class 6–10
Gold medal – first place	2008 Nakhon Ratchasima	Team class 10
Gold medal – first place	2014 Naypyidaw	Singles class 9
Gold medal – first place	2015 Singapore	Singles class 7–8
Gold medal – first place	2017 Kuala Lumpur	Singles class 6-8
Silver medal – second place	2015 Singapore	Doubles class 10
Bronze medal – third place	2015 Singapore	Team class 10
Bronze medal – third place	2017 Kuala Lumpur	Team class 9–10

Josephine Rebeta Medina (March 20, 1970 – September 2, 2021) was a Filipino table tennis player. Medina represented the Philippines at the 2012 and 2016 Summer Paralympics.

== Early career ==
Medina was influenced to take up table tennis as a sport by her father who used to compete for the Philippines internationally. She was afflicted with poliomyelitis, which affected the length of her legs. She competed with able-bodied players as a varsity player during her collegiate studies in order to cope with her family's financial problems.

She managed to qualify for a place at the national table tennis team but was later told she could not compete due to her disabilities.

== International career ==
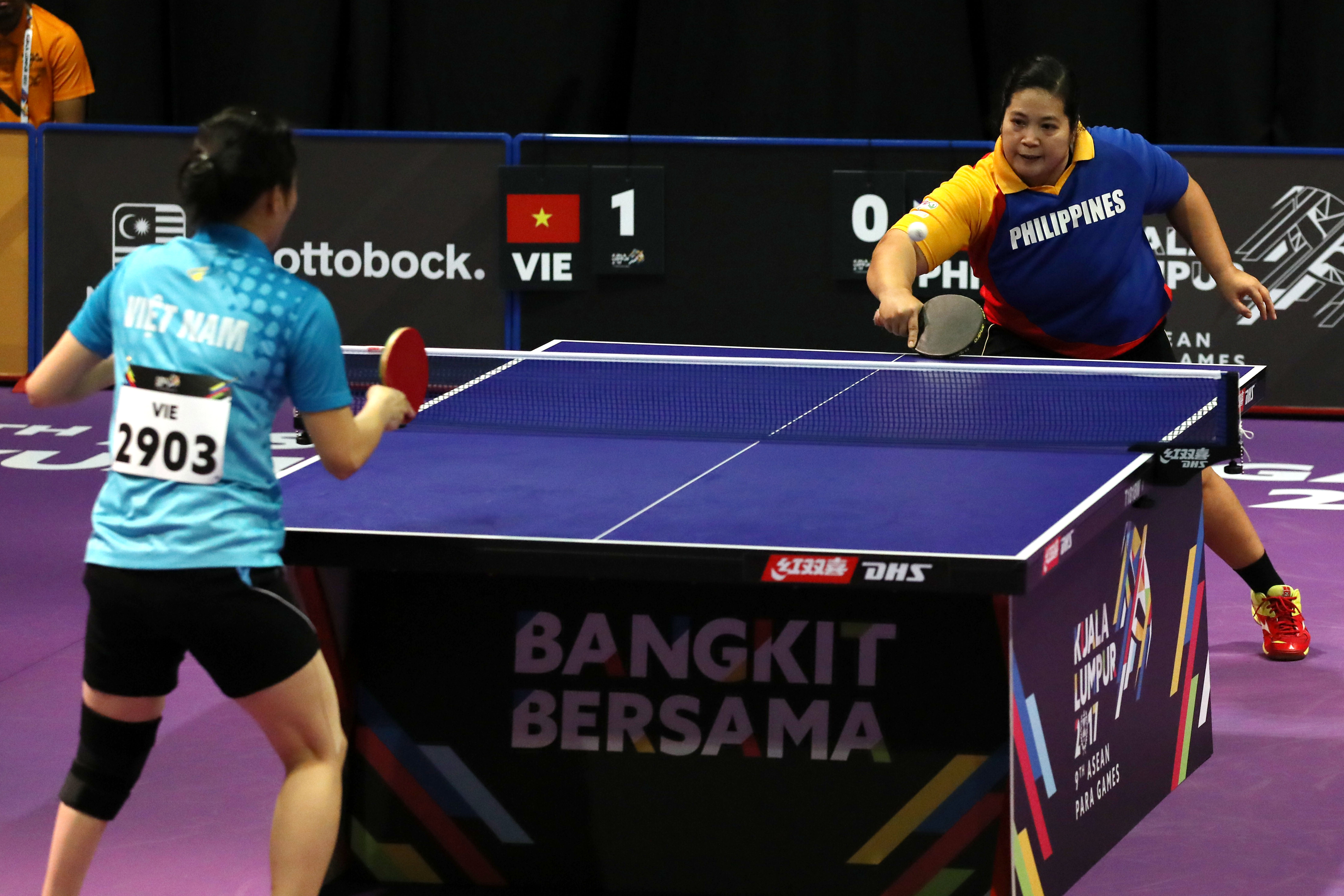
Medina (right) playing against a Vietnamese player (left) at the 2017 ASEAN ParaGames.

Medina subsequently competed in tournaments for disabled athletes instead and competed at her first international competition, the 2003 ASEAN Para Games. At the 2008 ASEAN Para Games, Medina achieved the most number of medals among the competitors for the Philippines winning 4 gold medals. She championed the single class 8 and single class 6-10 for the individual events, won the doubles open class 6-10 with Purificacion Mingarine, and the team class 10 with Minnie de Ramos and Mingarine.

Medina won a gold medal at the single class 9 event at the 2014 ASEAN Para Games. In 2015, Medina won gold for the Single Class 7-8 and a bronze in Double Class 10. In 2017, Medina won gold in the Singles Class SF6–8 and a bronze for Team Class TF9-10 with Minnie de Ramos Cadag.

She qualified for the 2018 World Para Table Tennis Championships by participating in qualifying tournaments using her own money for her expenses. After the 2016 Olympics in Rio de Janeiro she won a gold in a tournament in Thailand which was followed by another singles gold medal in a tournament in Las Vegas, Nevada. She garnered a silver and bronze in the 2017 Taichung Open in Taiwan securing qualification for the world para championships.

In March 2018, Medina was reportedly training without a coach for about six months until the Asian Para Games in Indonesia due to lack of time. To compensate for this, she practiced with the men's team of the member colleges of the University Athletic Association of the Philippines.

=== Paralympics ===
She competed at the 2012 Summer Paralympics but came short of achieving a podium finish. At the 2016 Summer Paralympics she won a bronze medal after defeating Juliane Wolf of Germany.

== Personal life ==
Medina's father, a former member of the national team, was Josephine's inspiration for taking up table tennis. Her father, who worked in Saudi Arabia last coaching the Royal Saudi Air Force, died in 2004. Medina dedicated her 2016 Summer Paralympic feat to her father.

Medina held a degree in industrial and organizational psychology from the Polytechnic University of the Philippines in Manila.

Medina died on September 2, 2021, at her home at age 51.
