= Agustin Kitan =

Filipino powerlifter

Personal information
- Nationality: Filipino
- Born: Agustin Podes Kitan; August 6, 1976 (age 49) Baguio, Philippines
- Height: 152 cm (4.99 ft) (2017)

Sport
- Country: Philippines
- Sport: Powerlifting
- Event(s): +52kg, +59kg, +65kg Category
- Coached by: Ramon Debuque

Achievements and titles
- Personal best: Men's -65 kg: 158kg (2017)
Medal record
Representing Philippines
Men's powerlifting
ASEAN Para Games
Bronze medal – third place	2017 Kuala Lumpur	-65 kg

Agustin Podes Kitan is a Filipino powerlifter who has competed at the Summer Paralympics.

== Early life ==
Kitan was born on August 6, 1976 in Baguio, Philippines though he is a native of Bauko, Mountain Province. He acquired an orthopedic impairment due to poliomyelitis.

== Career ==
Agustin Kitan took up the sport of powerlifting in 1996. He debuted at the Summer Paralympics in the 2004 edition which was hosted in Athens, Greece. He finished 14th among 16 athletes after he register a lift of 120 kg in the -52 kg event.

Kitan returned to the Summer Paralympics in the 2012 edition. He competed in the -52kg event but failed to record any mark. At the 2014 Asian Para Games he lifted 150 kg in the -59 kg event and was ranked 7th. He competed again in the Paralympics in 2016, now in the -59 kg event and finished 7th after lifting 145 kg.

At the 2017 Kuala Lumpur, Kitan lifted 158 kg in the -65 kg event to obtain a bronze medal. This result was best result so far. He then competed at the 2017 World Para Powerlifting Championships in Mexico. He finished 1st among 7 competitors in Group C of the -65 kg event though he was 14th among 22 athletes in the final ranking.

== Personal life ==
Agustin is married to Marivic with whom he has two sons.
