= Adeline Dumapong =

Filipina Paralympic powerlifter (born 1973)

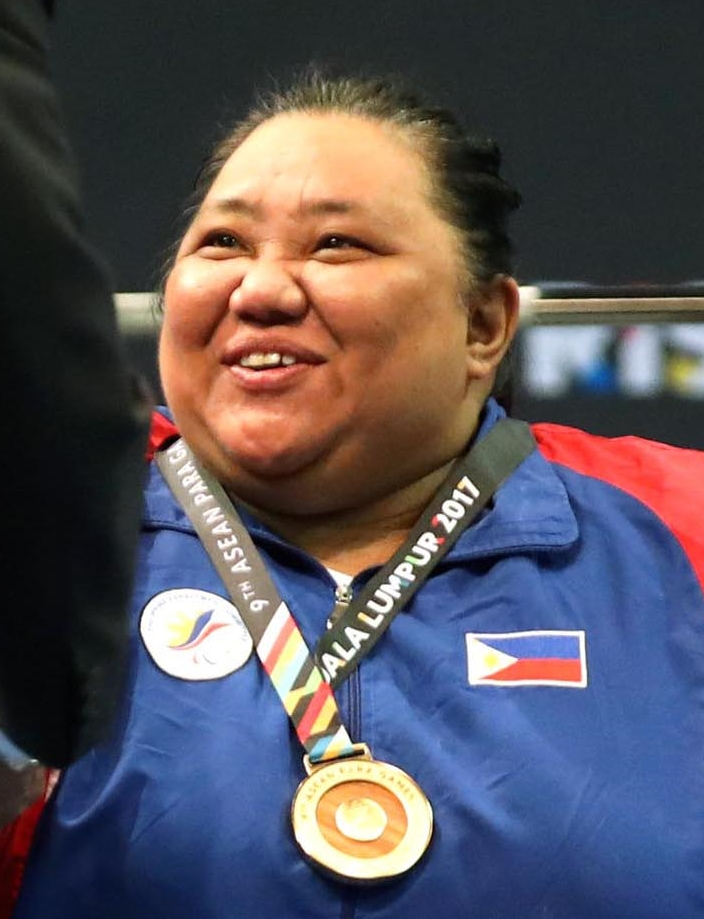
- Dumapong in 2017

Personal information
- Full name: Adeline Dumapong-Ancheta
- Nationality: Filipino
- Born: Adeline Dumapong; December 13, 1973 (age 52) Kiangan, Ifugao, Philippines
- Weight: 111.80 kg (246.5 lb) (2014)

Sport
- Country: Philippines
- Sport: Powerlifting
- Event: +82.5 kg Category
- Retired: 2024
Medal record
Event	1st	2nd	3rd
Paralympic Games	-	-	1
Paralympic Qualifier	1	-	-
IWAS World Games	1	-	-
Asian Para Games	-	2	1
FESPIC Games	-	2	-
ASEAN Para Games	5	3	-
Asian Powerlifting Open	1	-	-
Asian Benchpress Open	1	-	-
Malaysian Paralympiad	1	-	-
Total	10	7	2
Representing Philippines
Women's powerlifting
Paralympic Games
Bronze medal – third place	2000 Sydney	−82.5 kg
Paralympic Qualifier
Gold medal – first place	2000 Florida	+85 kg
IWAS World Games
Gold medal – first place	2009 Bangalore	+85 kg
Asian Para Games
Silver medal – second place	2014 Incheon	+85 kg
Silver medal – second place	2010 Guangzhou	+85 kg
Bronze medal – third place	2018 Jakarta	+86 kg
FESPIC Games
Silver medal – second place	1999 Bangkok	+85 kg
Silver medal – second place	2002 Busan	+82.5 kg
ASEAN Para Games
Gold medal – first place	2017 Kuala Lumpur	+85 kg
Gold medal – first place	2015 Singapore	+85 kg
Gold medal – first place	2011 Jakarta	+85 kg
Gold medal – first place	2008 Nakhon Ratchasima	+85 kg
Gold medal – first place	2005 Manila	+85 kg
Silver medal – second place	2022 Surakarta	+86 kg
Silver medal – second place	2014 Naypyidaw	+85 kg
Silver medal – second place	2001 Kuala Lumpur	+85 kg
Asian Powerlifting Open Championship
Gold medal – first place	2007 Manila	+85 kg
Asian Benchpress Championships
Gold medal – first place	1999 Manila	+85 kg
Malaysian Paralympiad
Gold medal – first place	2000 Kuala Lumpur	+85 kg

Adeline Dumapong-Ancheta (born December 13, 1973) is a Filipina retired Paralympic powerlifter and current coach. She became the first Filipina to win a Paralympic medal ever when she won bronze at the 2000 Summer Paralympics.

== Early life and education ==
Adeline Dumapong was born in Kiangan, Ifugao to a family of six children. She contracted polio when she was three years old. She spent her elementary and high school days in Bahay Mapagmahal, a housing institution for youth with disabilities and went to school at NOH School for Crippled Children inside the compound of Philippine Orthopedic Center, Quezon City.

She has a degree in computer secretarial from St. Paul University Quezon City.

== Career ==
Dumapong took up powerlifting in 1997 due to the encouragement of her male friends since she has a stocky build. She then went on to train at the Philippine Orthopedic Center in Banawe, Quezon City.

The International Paralympic Committee took notice of Dumapong when the Philippine Orthopedic Center's rehab department sent Dumapong's powerlifting record. Since then, she has won in tournaments outside the Philippines. She was also offered free training under Coach Ramon Debuque of the Zest Power Gym.

She competed at the 2000 Summer Paralympics in Sydney, Australia and competed at the women's −82.5 kg powerlifting event. She managed to win a bronze medal and became the first Paralympic representative of the Philippines to win a medal up until the 2016 Paralympics. She has also represented the country in the FESPIC Games, the precursor tournament of the Asian Para Games, where she won silver in the 1999 and 2000 editions. Her silver medal in the 2002 games was won in the −82.5 kg powerlifting event by lifting 105 kg.

Outside of competing, Dumapong has also joined Philippine Paralympic Committee President Mike Barredo in Congressional hearings to advocate for incentives and pay for para-athletes to be matched to their able-bodied counterparts.

Dumapong also competed at the 2014 Asian Para Games at the +86 kg event. She won a silver medal registering 115 kg. Her South Korean opponent, Lee Hyun-Jung, registered the same mark but won gold due to weighing 100.08 kg, lighter than Dumapong's 111.80 kg.

Dumapong announced her retirement in January 2024.

== Coach ==
Dumapong later became a coach of the Philippine para powerlifting team. She joined the delegation at the 2026 Asian Para Games.

== Personal life ==
After the 2000 Paralympics, Dumapong played and worked with a rondalla, an ensemble of stringed instruments composed of musically-inclined youth with disabilities. She also assists the Philippine Sports Association of the Differently Abled in various events. Dumapong gave birth to Alyssa Mei in May 2002, her first child and daughter.
