= Paralympic Committee of the Philippines =

National Paralympic Committee of the Philippines

Philippine Paralympic Committee

National Paralympic Committee
- Country: Philippines
- Code: PHI
- Created: August 1997
- Headquarters: Pasig
- President: Michael Barredo
- Secretary General: Godofredo "Goody" Custodio

The Philippine Paralympic Committee (PPC), formerly known as Philippine Sports Association for the Differently Abled—National Paralympic Committee of the Philippines, is the national sports association for physically impaired athletes, tasked to spearhead developing sport competency for Filipino persons with disabilities. It is the Philippine National Paralympic Committee which is duly recognized by the International Paralympic Committee.

The Philippine Sports Commission provides funding support for the PPC's operations and sport competitions. Just like the Philippine Olympic Committee, the PPC is the parallel organization sending qualified disabled national athletes to represent the country in international competitions, from regional to the elite, Paralympic level.

== History ==
The formation of the national sports association that focuses on sports played for Persons with Disabilities or PWDs started as an idea by Michael Barredo, then-former board member of the National Council for the Welfare of Disabled Persons (NCWDP) appointed by former president Fidel V. Ramos in December 1996, after the series of consultations between stakeholders of the sport together with the Philippine Sports Commission and the national strategic planning workshops through the help of then-PSC chairman Philip Ella Juico, NCWDP, and the consultants of Australian Sports Commission who involved in the development and promotion of olympic and paralympic sports in Australia. In 1997, the PHILSPADA was formed and registered with the Securities and Exchange Commission. 3 years later, PHILSPADA was one of the pioneer accredited member of the International Paralympic Committee. During the time when Butch Tuazon as appointed as PSC Chairman, Philspada inaugurated its main office in the Building E of the Philsports Complex in Pasig. Under the administration of Joseph Estrada, the President allocated funds for the promotion of paralympic sports in the country, including the formation of Philspada chapters across the 17 regions and established relationships with Deped, DILG, PSC, POC, other government agencies and the private sector.

PHILSPADA organized its first nationwide parasports tournament in Cebu in 2000.

In 2002, PHILSPADA became the founding member of the Asean Parasport Federation. In circa 2006–07, due to IPC requirement for those who considered as National Paralympic Committees, the name National Paralympic Committee of the Philippines was included in the organization's name.

Among the projects that successfully conceived by Philspada during the first years are 3-on-3 wheelchair basketball, powerlifting, the first national team in the 2000 Summer Paralympics and the hosting of the 3rd ASEAN Paragames in 2005, coinciding with the Southeast Asian Games.

In 2012, Philspada organized the first edition of the PSC–PHILSPADA National Para Games (Philippine National Para Games since 2024) in Marikina.

In 2016, PHILSPADA–NPC Philippines was renamed as the Philippine Paralympic Committee (PPC).

== Regional sporting events ==
Headed by Chief de Mission Gerardo "Ral" Rosario for PhilSPADA-NPC Philippines, the Philippine delegation of 65 Filipino disabled athletes competed in the 2015 ASEAN Para Games, a multi-sport event held from 3 to 9 December 2015, in Singapore. Among the athletes were Paralympians, seasoned veterans and a few debutants to the Games. The para athletes won a total 59 medals which placed the Philippines at 7th place out of 10 ASEAN nations, bringing home:

- 16 Gold medals (Athletics, Chess, Powerlifting, Swimming, Table Tennis)
- 17 Silver medals (Athletics, Chess, Sailing, Swimming, Table Tennis, Tenpin Bowling)
- 26 Bronze medals (Athletics, Chess, Sailing, Swimming, Table Tennis, Powerlifting, Tenpin Bowling, Wheelchair Basketball)

The national para athletes will compete in upcoming regional sports events aside from the Paralympics:

- 2017 ASEAN Para Games, Kuala Lumpur, Malaysia
- 2018 Asian Para Games in Jakarta - Palembang, Indonesia
- 2019 ASEAN Para Games slated to be held in home turf Metro Manila, the Philippines

== Recognition ==
The PPC as Philspada-NPC was named Disabled Group of the Year by the Apolinario Mabini Awards Committee on August 6, 2008. Philspada-NPC Phils. President Michael Barredo, former PSC commissioner, accepted the award from President Gloria Macapagal Arroyo in Malacañan Palace.

== See also ==
- Philippines at the Summer Paralympics
- Philippine National Para Games
- National Council on Disability Affairs (Philippines)
- Phil Sports Federation of the Deaf
- Philippine Olympic Committee
- PhilSports Complex
- Rizal Memorial Sports Complex
