= Swimming at the 2016 Summer Paralympics – Women's 50 metre freestyle S6 =

Women's 50 metre freestyle S6 at the XV Paralympic Games
- Venue: Olympic Aquatics Stadium
- Dates: 10 September 2016
- Competitors: 20 from 16 nations

Medalists
1st place, gold medalist(s)		Yelyzaveta Mereshko	Ukraine
2nd place, silver medalist(s)		Viktoriia Savtsova	Ukraine
3rd place, bronze medalist(s)		Tiffany Thomas Kane	Australia

The women's 50 metre freestyle S6 event at the 2016 Paralympic Games took place on 10 September 2016, at the Olympic Aquatics Stadium. Three heats were held. The swimmers with the eight fastest times advanced to the final.

== Heat 1 ==
9:54 10 September 2016:

Rank	Lane	Name	Nationality	Time	Notes
1	4	Tiffany Thomas Kane	Australia	35.27	Q
2	3	Nicole Turner	Ireland	36.70	Q
3	5	Emanuela Romano	Italy	37.04	Q
4	6	Sophia Elizabeth Herzog	United States	38.60	
5	2	Ayaallah Tewfick	Egypt	38.71	
6	7	Valeria Monserrat Lopez Gomez	Mexico	39.04	

== Heat 2 ==
9:57 10 September 2016:

Rank	Lane	Name	Nationality	Time	Notes
1	4	Yelyzaveta Mereshko	Ukraine	33.53	Q PR
2	3	Eleanor Simmonds	Great Britain	36.44	Q
3	6	Doramitzi Gonzalez	Mexico	37.89	
4	7	Vianney Trejo Delgadillo	Mexico	38.41	
5	5	Oksana Khrul	Ukraine	38.48	
6	2	Kate Wilson	Australia	39.81	
7	1	Maga Hovakimyan	Armenia	46.82	

== Heat 3 ==
10:00 10 September 2016:

Rank	Lane	Name	Nationality	Time	Notes
1	4	Viktoriia Savtsova	Ukraine	34.68	Q
2	5	Ellie Robinson	Great Britain	34.99	Q
3	3	Lingling Song	China	35.41	Q
4	7	Thi Bich Nhu Trinh	Vietnam	37.27	
5	6	Sabine Weber-Treiber	Austria	37.89	
6	2	Özlem Kaya	Turkey	39.20	
7	1	Thelma Bjorg Bjornsdottir	Iceland	42.14	

== Swim off ==
11:39 10 September 2016:

Rank	Lane	Name	Nationality	Time	Notes
1	4	Doramitzi Gonzalez	Mexico	37.98	
2	5	Sabine Weber-Treiber	Austria	38.12	

== Final ==
17:50 10 September 2016:

Rank	Lane	Name	Nationality	Time	Notes
1st place, gold medalist(s)	4	Yelyzaveta Mereshko	Ukraine	33.43	PR
2nd place, silver medalist(s)	5	Viktoriia Savtsova	Ukraine	33.68	
3rd place, bronze medalist(s)	6	Tiffany Thomas Kane	Australia	34.41	
4	3	Ellie Robinson	Great Britain	35.24	
5	2	Lingling Song	China	35.25	
6	7	Eleanor Simmonds	Great Britain	35.54	
7	1	Nicole Turner	Ireland	36.31	
8	8	Emanuela Romano	Italy	36.62	
