= Swimming at the 2016 Summer Paralympics – Women's 50 metre butterfly S6 =

Women's 50 metre butterfly S6 at the XV Paralympic Games
- Venue: Olympic Aquatics Stadium
- Dates: 9 September 2016
- Competitors: 10 from 8 nations

Medalists
1st place, gold medalist(s)		Ellie Robinson	Great Britain
2nd place, silver medalist(s)		Oksana Khrul	Ukraine
3rd place, bronze medalist(s)		Tiffany Thomas Kane	Australia

The women's 50 metre butterfly S6 event at the 2016 Paralympic Games took place on 9 September 2016, at the Olympic Aquatics Stadium in Rio de Janeiro. Two heats were held. The swimmers with the eight fastest times advanced to the final.

== Heats ==
=== Heat 1 ===
10:00 9 September 2016:

Rank	Lane	Name	Nationality	Time	Notes
1	4	Ellie Robinson	Great Britain	36.62	Q
2	5	Nicole Turner	Ireland	38.44	Q
3	6	Özlem Kaya	Turkey	40.65	Q
4	3	Olena Fedota	Ukraine	42.75	Q
5	2	Sophia Elizabeth Herzog	United States	43.14	

=== Heat 2 ===
10:03 9 September 2016:

Rank	Lane	Name	Nationality	Time	Notes
1	4	Oksana Khrul	Ukraine	37.16	Q
2	3	Tiffany Thomas Kane	Australia	37.81	Q
3	5	Dong Lu	China	39.11	Q
4	6	Thi Bich Nhu Trinh	Vietnam	42.08	Q
5	2	Tanya Huebner	Australia	42.80	

== Final ==
18:18 9 September 2016:

Rank	Lane	Name	Nationality	Time	Notes
1st place, gold medalist(s)	4	Ellie Robinson	Great Britain	35.58	PR
2nd place, silver medalist(s)	5	Oksana Khrul	Ukraine	36.45	
3rd place, bronze medalist(s)	3	Tiffany Thomas Kane	Australia	36.81	
4	2	Dong Lu	China	37.06	
5	6	Nicole Turner	Ireland	37.31	
6	7	Özlem Kaya	Turkey	40.60	
7	8	Olena Fedota	Ukraine	41.58	
8	1	Thi Bich Nhu Trinh	Vietnam	42.58	
