= Swimming at the 2016 Summer Paralympics – Women's 200 metre individual medley SM6 =

Women's 200 metre individual medley SM6 at the XV Paralympic Games
- Venue: Olympic Aquatics Stadium
- Dates: 12 September 2016
- Competitors: 13 from 10 nations

Medalists
1st place, gold medalist(s)		Eleanor Simmonds	Great Britain
2nd place, silver medalist(s)		Lingling Song	China
3rd place, bronze medalist(s)		Tiffany Thomas Kane	Australia

The women's 200 metre individual medley SM6 event at the 2016 Paralympic Games took place on 12 September 2016, at the Olympic Aquatics Stadium. Two heats were held. The swimmers with the eight fastest times advanced to the final.

== Heats ==
=== Heat 1 ===
11:30 12 September 2016:

Rank	Lane	Name	Nationality	Time	Notes
1	4	Yelyzaveta Mereshko	Ukraine	3:04.71	PR Q
2	5	Tiffany Thomas Kane	Australia	3:10.48	Q
3	3	Dong Lu	China	3:15.62	Q
4	6	Sophia Elizabeth Herzog	United States	3:16.41	Q
5	2	Reilly Boyt	United States	3:21.10	
6	7	Fanni Illes	Hungary	3:27.02	

=== Heat 2 ===
11:36 12 September 2016:

Rank	Lane	Name	Nationality	Time	Notes
1	4	Eleanor Simmonds	Great Britain	3:02.40	PR Q
2	5	Lingling Song	China	3:09.93	Q
3	3	Verena Schott	Germany	3:16.63	Q
4	6	Nicole Turner	Ireland	3:17.09	Q
5	7	Vianney Trejo Delgadillo	Mexico	3:22.83	
6	2	Kate Wilson	Australia	3:29.20	
7	1	Thelma Bjorg Bjornsdottir	Iceland	3:58.13	

== Final ==
19:39 12 September 2016:

Rank	Lane	Name	Nationality	Time	Notes
1st place, gold medalist(s)	4	Eleanor Simmonds	Great Britain	2:59.81	WR
2nd place, silver medalist(s)	3	Lingling Song	China	3:03.19	
3rd place, bronze medalist(s)	6	Tiffany Thomas Kane	Australia	3:09.78	
4	1	Verena Schott	Germany	3:10.44	
5	2	Dong Lu	China	3:13.47	
6	7	Sophia Elizabeth Herzog	United States	3:13.57	
7	8	Nicole Turner	Ireland	3:18.18	
	5	Yelyzaveta Mereshko	Ukraine		DSQ
