= Swimming at the 2016 Summer Paralympics – Women's 400 metre freestyle S6 =

Women's 400 metre freestyle S6 at the XV Paralympic Games
- Venue: Olympic Aquatics Stadium
- Dates: 13 September 2016
- Competitors: 14 from 10 nations

Medalists
1st place, gold medalist(s)		Yelyzaveta Mereshko	Ukraine
2nd place, silver medalist(s)		Lingling Song	China
3rd place, bronze medalist(s)		Eleanor Simmonds	Great Britain

The women's 400 metre freestyle S6 event at the 2016 Paralympic Games took place on 13 September 2016, at the Olympic Aquatics Stadium. Two heats were held. The swimmers with the eight fastest times advanced to the final.

== Heats ==
=== Heat 1 ===
9:46 13 September 2016:

Rank	Lane	Name	Nationality	Time	Notes
1	4	Eleanor Simmonds	Great Britain	5:37.75	Q
2	5	Ellie Robinson	Great Britain	5:41.04	Q
3	3	Vianney Trejo Delgadillo	Mexico	5:56.01	Q
4	7	Fanni Illes	Hungary	6:01.11	
5	6	Valeria Monserrat Lopez Gomez	Mexico	6:05.96	
6	1	Reilly Boyt	United States	6:23.45	
7	2	Thelma Bjorg Bjornsdottir	Iceland	6:34.71	

=== Heat 2 ===
9:55 13 September 2016:

Rank	Lane	Name	Nationality	Time	Notes
1	4	Yelyzaveta Mereshko	Ukraine	5:25.27	Q
2	5	Lingling Song	China	5:35.43	Q
3	3	Viktoriia Savtsova	Ukraine	5:43.05	Q
4	6	Nicole Turner	Ireland	5:51.99	Q
5	2	Emanuela Romano	Italy	5:58.53	Q
6	7	Ayaallah Tewfick	Egypt	6:01.32	
7	1	Sophia Elizabeth Herzog	United States	6:17.93	

== Final ==
17:41 13 September 2016:

Rank	Lane	Name	Nationality	Time	Notes
1st place, gold medalist(s)	4	Yelyzaveta Mereshko	Ukraine	5:17.01	PR
2nd place, silver medalist(s)	5	Lingling Song	China	5:21.37	
3rd place, bronze medalist(s)	3	Eleanor Simmonds	Great Britain	5:24.87	
4	6	Ellie Robinson	Great Britain	5:27.53	
5	2	Viktoriia Savtsova	Ukraine	5:36.07	
6	1	Vianney Trejo Delgadillo	Mexico	5:48.19	
7	8	Emanuela Romano	Italy	5:51.05	
8	7	Nicole Turner	Ireland	5:54.61	
