= Swimming at the 2012 Summer Paralympics – Women's 50 metre freestyle S6 =

Women's 50 metre freestyle S6 at the XIV Paralympic Games
- Venue: London Aquatics Centre
- Dates: 4 September
- Competitors: 21 from 14 nations

Medalists
1st place, gold medalist(s)		Mirjam de Koning-Peper	Netherlands
2nd place, silver medalist(s)		Victoria Arlen	United States
3rd place, bronze medalist(s)		Eleanor Simmonds	Great Britain

The women's 50 metre freestyle S6 event at the 2012 Paralympic Games took place on 4 September, at the London Aquatics Centre.

Three heats were held, with even swimmers at each. The swimmers with the eight fastest times advanced to the final.

== Heats ==
Rank	Heat	Lane	Name	Nationality	Time	Notes
1	3	4	Mirjam de Koning-Peper	Netherlands	35.05	Q, PR
2	2	4	Victoria Arlen	United States	35.48	Q
3	1	4	Tanja Groepper	Germany	35.76	Q
4	3	5	Eleanor Simmonds	Great Britain	36.45	Q
5	1	5	Olena Fedota	Ukraine	37.34	Q
6	2	5	Noga Nir-Kistler	United States	37.40	Q
7	3	6	Oksana Khrul	Ukraine	37.46	Q
8	3	2	Ozlem Baykiz	Turkey	38.04	Q
9	1	3	Erika Nara	Japan	38.36	
10	2	3	Natalie Jones	Great Britain	38.74	
11	3	3	Tanya Huebner	Australia	38.78	
12	2	6	Emanuela Romano	Italy	38.79	
13	3	7	Inbal Schwartz	Israel	39.02	
14	2	1	Sarah Rose	Australia	39.37	
15	1	2	Vianney Trejo Delgadillo	Mexico	39.60	
16	2	2	Sabine Weber-Treiber	Austria	39.84	
17	2	7	Anastasia Diodorova	Russia	40.07	
18	1	7	Ileana Rodriguez	United States	41.14	
19	3	1	Karina Domingo Bello	Mexico	42.46	
20	1	1	Bea Riza Ma Josephine Roble	Philippines	47.24	
–	1	6	Doramitzi Gonzalez	Mexico	DSQ	

== Final ==
Rank	Lane	Name	Nationality	Time	Notes
1st place, gold medalist(s)	4	Mirjam de Koning-Peper	Netherlands	34.77	PR
2nd place, silver medalist(s)	5	Victoria Arlen	United States	35.32	AM
3rd place, bronze medalist(s)	6	Eleanor Simmonds	Great Britain	36.11	
4	3	Tanja Groepper	Germany	36.28	
5	1	Oksana Khrul	Ukraine	36.77	
6	7	Noga Nir-Kistler	United States	36.38	
7	2	Olena Fedota	Ukraine	37.15	
8	8	Ozlem Baykiz	Turkey	37.39	
