= Swimming at the 2016 Summer Paralympics – Women's 100 metre freestyle S6 =

Women's 100 metre freestyle S6 at the XV Paralympic Games
- Venue: Olympic Aquatics Stadium
- Dates: 17 September 2016
- Competitors: 17 from 11 nations

Medalists
1st place, gold medalist(s)		Yelyzaveta Mereshko	Ukraine
2nd place, silver medalist(s)		Viktoriia Savtsova	Ukraine
3rd place, bronze medalist(s)		Ellie Robinson	Great Britain

The women's 100 metre freestyle S6 event at the 2016 Paralympic Games took place on 17 September 2016, at the Olympic Aquatics Stadium. Three heats were held. The swimmers with the eight fastest times advanced to the final.

== Heats ==
=== Heat 1 ===
9:40 17 September 2016:

Rank	Lane	Name	Nationality	Time	Notes
1	5	Ellie Robinson	Great Britain	1:16.76	Q
2	4	Tiffany Thomas Kane	Australia	1:17.75	Q
3	3	Olena Fedota	Ukraine	1:23.46	
4	2	Fanni Illes	Hungary	1:23.88	
5	7	Sophia Elizabeth Herzog	United States	1:25.89	

=== Heat 2 ===
9:45 17 September 2016:

Rank	Lane	Name	Nationality	Time	Notes
1	4	Viktoriia Savtsova	Ukraine	1:15.04	Q
2	5	Lingling Song	China	1:18.50	Q
3	6	Vianney Trejo Delgadillo	Mexico	1:22.39	Q
4	7	Kate Wilson	Australia	1:27.02	
5	2	Thelma Bjorg Bjornsdottir	Iceland	1:27.04	
6	1	Laxmi Kunwar	Nepal	3:11.76	

=== Heat 3 ===
9:48 17 September 2016:

Rank	Lane	Name	Nationality	Time	Notes
1	4	Yelyzaveta Mereshko	Ukraine	1:12.49	PR Q
2	5	Eleanor Simmonds	Great Britain	1:16.39	Q
3	3	Emanuela Romano	Italy	1:20.15	Q
4	6	Doramitzi Gonzalez	Mexico	1:24.32	
5	2	Valeria Monserrat Lopez Gomez	Mexico	1:24.78	
6	1	Sabine Weber-Treiber	Austria	1:27.88	

== Final ==
17:36 17 September 2016:

Rank	Lane	Name	Nationality	Time	Notes
1st place, gold medalist(s)	4	Yelyzaveta Mereshko	Ukraine	1:11.40	WR
2nd place, silver medalist(s)	5	Viktoriia Savtsova	Ukraine	1:13.47	
3rd place, bronze medalist(s)	6	Ellie Robinson	Great Britain	1:14.43	
4	7	Lingling Song	China	1:14.46	
5	3	Eleanor Simmonds	Great Britain	1:15.77	
6	2	Tiffany Thomas Kane	Australia	1:17.56	
7	1	Emanuela Romano	Italy	1:18.34	
8	8	Vianney Trejo Delgadillo	Mexico	1:22.05	
