= Swimming at the 2016 Summer Paralympics – Women's 100 metre breaststroke SB6 =

Women's 100 metre breaststroke SB6 at the XV Paralympic Games
- Venue: Olympic Aquatics Stadium
- Dates: 15 September 2016
- Competitors: 12 from 8 nations

Medalists
1st place, gold medalist(s)		Tiffany Thomas Kane	Australia
2nd place, silver medalist(s)		Sophia Elizabeth Herzog	United States
3rd place, bronze medalist(s)		Charlotte Henshaw	Great Britain

The women's 100 metre breaststroke SB6 event at the 2016 Paralympic Games took place on 15 September 2016, at the Olympic Aquatics Stadium. Two heats were held. The swimmers with the eight fastest times advanced to the final.

== Heats ==
=== Heat 1 ===
9:55 15 September 2016:

Rank	Lane	Name	Nationality	Time	Notes
1	4	Charlotte Henshaw	Great Britain	1:38.11	PR Q
2	5	Eleanor Simmonds	Great Britain	1:43.49	Q
3	3	Reilly Boyt	United States	1:44.35	Q
4	6	Kate Wilson	Australia	1:49.21	Q
5	7	Özlem Kaya	Turkey	1:52.15	
6	2	Nydia Langill	Canada	1:55.13	

=== Heat 2 ===
9:59 15 September 2016:

Rank	Lane	Name	Nationality	Time	Notes
1	4	Tiffany Thomas Kane	Australia	1:35.43	PR Q
2	5	Sophia Elizabeth Herzog	United States	1:38.22	Q
3	3	Tanya Huebner	Australia	1:42.66	Q
4	6	Nicole Turner	Ireland	1:48.13	Q
5	2	Nina Kozlova	Ukraine	1:50.49	
6	7	Arianna Talamona	Italy	1:52.14	

== Final ==
17:50 15 September 2016:

Rank	Lane	Name	Nationality	Time	Notes
1st place, gold medalist(s)	4	Tiffany Thomas Kane	Australia	1:35.39	PR
2nd place, silver medalist(s)	3	Sophia Elizabeth Herzog	United States	1:36.95	
3rd place, bronze medalist(s)	5	Charlotte Henshaw	Great Britain	1:37.79	
4	2	Eleanor Simmonds	Great Britain	1:39.46	
5	6	Tanya Huebner	Australia	1:40.54	
6	7	Reilly Boyt	United States	1:44.95	
7	1	Nicole Turner	Ireland	1:46.19	
8	8	Kate Wilson	Australia	1:46.87	
