= Swimming at the 2012 Summer Paralympics – Women's 200 metre individual medley SM6 =

Women's 200m Ind. Medley SM6 at the XIV Paralympic Games
- Venue: London Aquatics Centre
- Dates: 3 September
- Competitors: 16 from 12 nations
- Winning time: 3:05.39

Medalists
1st place, gold medalist(s)		Eleanor Simmonds	Great Britain
2nd place, silver medalist(s)		Verena Schott	Germany
3rd place, bronze medalist(s)		Natalie Jones	Great Britain

The women's 200m individual medley SM6 event at the 2012 Summer Paralympics took place at the London Aquatics Centre on 3 September. There were two heats; the swimmers with the eight fastest times advanced to the final.

== Results ==
=== Heats ===
Competed from 09:47.

==== Heat 1 ====
Rank	Lane	Name	Nationality	Time	Notes
1	4	Verena Schott	Germany	3:16.63	Q
2	5	Jiang Fuying	China	3:20.39	Q
3	3	Anastasia Diodorova	Russia	3:26.42	Q
4	2	Karina Domingo Bello	Mexico	3:34.52	
5	1	Sarah Rose	Australia	3:36.84	
6	6	Tanya Huebner	Australia	3:39.12	
7	7	Ozlem Baykiz	Turkey	3:39.14	
8	8	Ileana Rodriguez	United States	3:51.70	

==== Heat 2 ====
Rank	Lane	Name	Nationality	Time	Notes
1	4	Eleanor Simmonds	Great Britain	3:06.97	Q, WR
2	5	Natalie Jones	Great Britain	3:16.41	Q
3	3	Oksana Khrul	Ukraine	3:22.13	Q
4	6	Elizabeth Johnson	Great Britain	3:28.22	Q
5	2	Vianney Trejo Delgadillo	Mexico	3:32.78	Q
6	8	Emanuela Romano	Italy	3:34.03	
7	1	Fanni Illes	Hungary	3:40.66	
8	7	Julia Castello Farre	Spain	3:40.68	

=== Final ===
Competed at 17:39.

Rank	Lane	Name	Nationality	Time	Notes
1st place, gold medalist(s)	4	Eleanor Simmonds	Great Britain	3:05.39	WR
2nd place, silver medalist(s)	3	Verena Schott	Germany	3:14.28	
3rd place, bronze medalist(s)	5	Natalie Jones	Great Britain	3:14.29	
4	2	Oksana Khrul	Ukraine	3:17.10	
5	6	Jiang Fuying	China	3:19.18	
6	1	Elizabeth Johnson	Great Britain	3:25.64	
7	7	Anastasia Diodorova	Russia	3:26.77	
8	8	Vianney Trejo Delgadillo	Mexico	3:28.97	

'Q = qualified for final. WR = World Record.
