= Swimming at the 2016 Summer Paralympics – Women's 50 metre butterfly =

The women's 50 metre butterfly swimming events for the 2016 Summer Paralympics take place at the Rio Olympic Stadium from 8 to 15 September. A total of three events were contested for different classifications.

== Competition format ==
Each event consists of two rounds: heats and final. The top eight swimmers overall in the heats progress to the final. If there are eight or fewer swimmers in an event, no heats are held and all swimmers qualify for the final.

== Results ==
=== S5 ===
18:03 10 September 2016:

| Rank | Lane | Name | Nationality | Time | Notes |
|---|---|---|---|---|---|
| 1st place, gold medalist(s) | 4 | Xihan Xu | China | 43.62 | |
| 2nd place, silver medalist(s) | 1 | Sarah Louise Rung | Norway | 45.67 | |
| 3rd place, bronze medalist(s) | 6 | Giulia Ghiretti | Italy | 45.74 | |
| 4 | 5 | Reka Kezdi | Hungary | 45.82 | |
| 5 | 3 | Teresa Perales | Spain | 47.36 | |
| 6 | 8 | Joana Maria Silva | Brazil | 47.51 | |
| 7 | 2 | Natallia Shavel | Belarus | 47.55 | |
| 8 | 7 | Sevilay Ozturk | Turkey | 50.89 | |

=== S6 ===
18:18 9 September 2016:

| Rank | Lane | Name | Nationality | Time | Notes |
|---|---|---|---|---|---|
| 1st place, gold medalist(s) | 4 | Ellie Robinson | Great Britain | 35.58 | PR |
| 2nd place, silver medalist(s) | 5 | Oksana Khrul | Ukraine | 36.45 | |
| 3rd place, bronze medalist(s) | 3 | Tiffany Thomas Kane | Australia | 36.81 | |
| 4 | 2 | Dong Lu | China | 37.06 | |
| 5 | 6 | Nicole Turner | Ireland | 37.31 | |
| 6 | 7 | Ozlem Kaya | Turkey | 40.60 | |
| 7 | 8 | Olena Fedota | Ukraine | 41.58 | |
| 8 | 1 | Thi Bich Nhu Trinh | Vietnam | 42.58 | |

=== S7 ===
20:08 12 September 2016:

| Rank | Lane | Name | Nationality | Time | Notes |
|---|---|---|---|---|---|
| 1st place, gold medalist(s) | 5 | Susannah Rodgers | Great Britain | 35.07 | |
| 2nd place, silver medalist(s) | 3 | Cortney Jordan | United States | 35.46 | |
| 3rd place, bronze medalist(s) | 4 | Nikita Howarth | New Zealand | 35.97 | |
| 4 | 6 | Sarah Mehain | Canada | 36.46 | |
| 5 | 7 | Judit Rolo Marichal | Spain | 37.78 | |
| 6 | 2 | McKenzie Coan | United States | 37.87 | |
| 7 | 8 | Tess Routliffe | Canada | 39.17 | |
| 8 | 1 | Verônica Almeida | Brazil | 39.51 | |
