= Swimming at the 2012 Summer Paralympics – Women's 400 metre freestyle S6 =

Women's 400m Freestyle S6 at the XIV Paralympic Games
- Venue: London Aquatics Centre
- Dates: 1 September
- Competitors: 14 from 11 nations
- Winning time: 5:19.17

Medalists
1st place, gold medalist(s)		Eleanor Simmonds	Great Britain
2nd place, silver medalist(s)		Victoria Arlen	United States
3rd place, bronze medalist(s)		Song Lingling	China

The women's 400m freestyle S6 event at the 2012 Summer Paralympics took place at the London Aquatics Centre on 1 September. There were two heats; the swimmers with the eight fastest times advanced to the final.

== Results ==
=== Heats ===
Competed from 10:06.

==== Heat 1 ====
Rank	Lane	Name	Nationality	Time	Notes
1	4	Eleanor Simmonds	Great Britain	5:24.64	Q, PR
2	5	Song Lingling	China	5:44.68	Q, AS
3	3	Natalie Jones	Great Britain	6:03.95	Q
4	2	Doramitzi Gonzalez	Mexico	6:14.32	Q
5	6	Karina Domingo Bello	Mexico	6:23.41	
6	7	Tanja Groepper	Germany	6:24.56	
7	1	Lorena Homar Lopez	Spain	7:16.32	

==== Heat 2 ====
Rank	Lane	Name	Nationality	Time	Notes
1	4	Victoria Arlen	United States	5:25.19	Q
2	5	Mirjam de Koning-Peper	Netherlands	5:44.63	Q
3	6	Emanuela Romano	Italy	5:46.69	Q
4	3	Vianney Trejo Delgadillo	Mexico	5:47.07	Q
5	2	Fanni Illes	Hungary	6:21.11	
6	1	Ozlem Baykiz	Turkey	6:46.50	
7	7	Anastasia Diodorova	Russia	6:49.35	

=== Final ===
Competed at 17:56.

Rank	Lane	Name	Nationality	Time	Notes
1st place, gold medalist(s)	4	Eleanor Simmonds	Great Britain	5:19.17	WR
2nd place, silver medalist(s)	5	Victoria Arlen	United States	5:20.18	AM
3rd place, bronze medalist(s)	6	Song Lingling	China	5:33.73	AS
4	3	Mirjam de Koning-Peper	Netherlands	5:38.06	
5	2	Emanuela Romano	Italy	5:44.36	
6	7	Vianney Trejo Delgadillo	Mexico	5:47.85	
7	1	Natalie Jones	Great Britain	6:02.02	
8	8	Doramitzi Gonzalez	Mexico	6:29.51	

'Q = qualified for final. WR = World Record. PR = Paralympic Record. AM = Americas Record. AS = Asian Record.
