= Swimming at the 2012 Summer Paralympics – Women's 100 metre freestyle S6 =

Women's 100m Freestyle S6 at the XIV Paralympic Games
- Venue: London Aquatics Centre
- Dates: 8 September
- Competitors: 21 from 16 nations
- Winning time: 1:13.33

Medalists
1st place, gold medalist(s)		Victoria Arlen	United States
2nd place, silver medalist(s)		Eleanor Simmonds	Great Britain
3rd place, bronze medalist(s)		Tanja Gröpper	Germany

The women's 100m freestyle S6 event at the 2012 Summer Paralympics took place at the London Aquatics Centre on 8 September. There were three heats; the swimmers with the eight fastest times advanced to the final.

== Results ==
=== Heats ===
Competed from 09:57.

==== Heat 1 ====
Rank	Lane	Name	Nationality	Time	Notes
1	3	Erika Nara	Japan	1:22.32	Q
2	5	Natalie Jones	Great Britain	1:22.74	Q
3	6	Noga Nir-Kistler	United States	1:23.75	
4	2	Ileana Rodriguez	United States	1:31.35	
5	7	Inbal Schwartz	Israel	1:31.62	
6	1	Bea Riza Ma Josephine Roble	Philippines	1:41.27	
	4	Mirjam de Koning-Peper	Netherlands	DNS	

==== Heat 2 ====
Rank	Lane	Name	Nationality	Time	Notes
1	4	Eleanor Simmonds	Great Britain	1:16.68	Q, PR
2	5	Song Lingling	China	1:18.46	Q
3	3	Emanuela Romano	Italy	1:20.54	Q
4	6	Doramitzi González	Mexico	1:24.32	
5	7	Özlem Baykız	Turkey	1:29.64	
6	2	Fanni Illés	Hungary	1:30.14	
7	1	Luo Alice Hsiao Hung	Chinese Taipei	1:34.31	

==== Heat 3 ====
Rank	Lane	Name	Nationality	Time	Notes
1	4	Victoria Arlen	United States	1:14.74	Q, =WR
2	5	Tanja Gröpper	Germany	1:16.72	Q
3	3	Olena Fedota	Ukraine	1:21.92	Q
4	6	Vianney Trejo Delgadillo	Mexico	1:23.71	
5	2	Tanya Huebner	Australia	1:30.76	
6	7	Karina Domingo Bello	Mexico	1:32.19	
7	1	Sabine Weber-Treiber	Austria	1:32.37	

=== Final ===
Competed at 17:51.

Rank	Lane	Name	Nationality	Time	Notes
1st place, gold medalist(s)	4	Victoria Arlen	United States	1:13.33	WR
2nd place, silver medalist(s)	5	Eleanor Simmonds	Great Britain	1:14.82	EU
3rd place, bronze medalist(s)	3	Tanja Gröpper	Germany	1:16.83	
4	6	Song Lingling	China	1:16.84	AS
5	2	Emanuela Romano	Italy	1:19.54	
6	7	Olena Fedota	Ukraine	1:19.97	
7	8	Natalie Jones	Great Britain	1:22.64	
8	1	Erika Nara	Japan	1:25.16	

'Q = qualified for final. WR = World Record. PR = Paralympic Record. EU = European Record. AS = Asian Record. DNS = Did not start.
