= Swimming at the 2016 Summer Paralympics – Women's 100 metre backstroke S6 =

Women's 100 metre backstroke S6 at the XV Paralympic Games
- Venue: Olympic Aquatics Stadium
- Dates: 8 September 2016
- Competitors: 11 from 8 nations

Medalists
1st place, gold medalist(s)		Lingling Song	China
2nd place, silver medalist(s)		Dong Lu	China
3rd place, bronze medalist(s)		Oksana Khrul	Ukraine

The women's 100 metre backstroke S6 event at the 2016 Paralympic Games took place on 8 September, at the Olympic Aquatics Stadium. Two heats were held, one with six swimmers and one with five. The swimmers with the eight fastest times advanced to the final.

== Heats ==
=== Heat 1 ===
9:42 8 September 2016:

Rank	Lane	Name	Nationality	Time	Notes
1	4	Lingling Song	China	1:24.66	WR Q
2	5	Yelyzaveta Mereshko	Ukraine	1:27.64	Q
3	3	Emanuela Romano	Italy	1:32.42	Q
4	6	Natalya Zvyagintseva	Kazakhstan	1:36.82	Q
5	2	Fanni Illes	Hungary	1:38.64	

=== Heat 2 ===
9:42 8 September 2016:

Rank	Lane	Name	Nationality	Time	Notes
1	4	Dong Lu	China	1:26.43	Q
2	3	Tiffany Thomas Kane	Australia	1:31.58	Q
3	5	Oksana Khrul	Ukraine	1:31.66	Q
4	6	Vianney Trejo Delgadillo	Mexico	1:34.01	Q
5	7	Reilly Boyt	United States	1:37.22	
6	2	Doramitzi Gonzalez	Mexico	1:40.71	

== Final ==
17:37 8 September 2016:

Rank	Lane	Name	Nationality	Time	Notes
1st place, gold medalist(s)	4	Lingling Song	China	1:21.43	WR
2nd place, silver medalist(s)	5	Dong Lu	China	1:21.65	
3rd place, bronze medalist(s)	2	Oksana Khrul	Ukraine	1:26.82	
4	3	Yelyzaveta Mereshko	Ukraine	1:28.99	
5	7	Emanuela Romano	Italy	1:32.45	
6	1	Vianney Trejo Delgadillo	Mexico	1:33.56	
7	8	Natalya Zvyagintseva	Kazakhstan	1:34.59	
	6	Tiffany Thomas Kane	Australia		DSQ
