= Swimming at the 2020 Summer Paralympics – Women's 50 metre butterfly =

The Women's 50 metre butterfly swimming events for the 2020 Summer Paralympics took place at the Tokyo Aquatics Centre from August 27 to September 3, 2021. A total of three events were contested over this distance.

== Schedule ==
H	Heats	½	Semifinals	F	Final

Date	Fri 27		Sat 28		Sun 29		Mon 30		Tue 31		Wed 1		Thu 2		Fri 3	
Event	M	E	M	E	M	E	M	E	M	E	M	E	M	E	M	E
S5 50m	H	F														
S6 50m							H	F								
S7 50m															H	F

== Medal summary ==
The following is a summary of the medals awarded across all 50 metre butterfly events.

Classification	Gold		Silver		Bronze	
S5	Lu Dong; China	39.54 WR	Marta Fernández; Spain	40.22 WR	Cheng Jiao; China	43.04
S6	Jiang Yuyan; China	34.69	Nicole Turner; Ireland	36.30	Elizabeth Marks; United States	36.83
S7	Danielle Dorris; Canada	32.99 WR	Mallory Weggemann; United States	34.30	Giulia Terzi; Italy	34.32

== Results ==
The following were the results of the finals only of each of the Women's 50 metre butterfly events in each of the classifications. Further details of each event, including where appropriate heats and semi finals results, are available on that event's dedicated page.

=== S5 ===
The S5 category is for swimmers who have hemiplegia, paraplegia or short stature.

The final in this classification took place on 27 August 2021:

Rank	Lane	Name	Nationality	Time	Notes
1st place, gold medalist(s)	4	Lu Dong	China	39.54	WR (S5)
2nd place, silver medalist(s)	5	Marta Fernández Infante	Spain	40.22	WR (S4)
3rd place, bronze medalist(s)	3	Cheng Jiao	China	43.04	
4	7	Joana Maria da Silva Neves	Brazil	45.33	
5	6	Sevilay Öztürk	Turkey	45.81	
6	2	Yao Cuan	China	46.13	
7	1	Esthefany Rodrigues	Brazil	46.49	
8	8	Giulia Ghiretti	Italy	46.66	

=== S6 ===
The S6 category is for swimmers who have short stature, arm amputations, or some form of coordination problem on one side of their body.

The final in this classification took place on 30 August 2021:

Rank	Lane	Name	Nationality	Time	Notes
1st place, gold medalist(s)	4	Jiang Yuyan	China	34.69	
2nd place, silver medalist(s)	5	Nicole Turner	Ireland	36.30	
3rd place, bronze medalist(s)	3	Elizabeth Marks	United States	36.83	AM
4	7	Verena Schott	Germany	37.03	
5	6	Eleanor Robinson	Great Britain	37.08	
6	2	Sara Vargas Blanco	Colombia	37.33	
7	1	Liu Daomin	China	38.38	
8	8	Viktoriia Savtsova	Ukraine	41.04	

=== S7 ===
The S7 category is for swimmers who have one leg and one arm amputation on opposite side or paralysis on one side of their body. These swimmers have full control of their arms and trunk but variable function in their legs.

The final in this classification took place on 3 September 2021:

Rank	Lane	Name	Nationality	Time	Notes
1st place, gold medalist(s)	4	Danielle Dorris	Canada	32.99	WR
2nd place, silver medalist(s)	5	Mallory Weggemann	United States	34.30	
3rd place, bronze medalist(s)	3	Giulia Terzi	Italy	34.32	ER
4	6	Ani Palian	RPC	35.73	
5	2	Julia Gaffney	United States	35.74	
6	8	Nikita Howarth	New Zealand	36.92	
7	7	McKenzie Coan	United States	37.47	
8	1	An Nishida	Japan	37.98	
