= Swimming at the 2012 Summer Paralympics – Women's 100 metre backstroke S6 =

Women's 100 metre backstroke S6 at the XIV Paralympic Games
- Venue: London Aquatics Centre
- Dates: 30 August
- Competitors: 16 from 12 nations

Medalists
1st place, gold medalist(s)		Lu Dong	China
2nd place, silver medalist(s)		Nyree Kindred	Great Britain
3rd place, bronze medalist(s)		Mirjam de Koning-Peper	Netherlands

The women's 100 metre backstroke S6 event at the 2012 Paralympic Games took place on 30 August, at the London Aquatics Centre.

Two heats were held, with eight swimmers each. The swimmers with the eight fastest times advanced to the final.

== Heats ==
=== Heat 1 ===
Rank	Lane	Name	Nationality	Time	Notes
1	4	Lu Dong	China	1:28.18 PR	Q
2	3	Oksana Khrul	Ukraine	1:31.71	Q
3	5	Anastasia Diodorova	Russia	1:33.61	Q
4	6	Vianney Trejo Delgadillo	Mexico	1:36.64	
5	2	Fanni Illes	Hungary	1:39.74	
6	7	Inbal Schwartz	Israel	1:44.43	
7	1	Lorena Homar Lopez	Spain	1:49.63	
8	8	Karina Domingo Bello	Mexico	1:49.65	

=== Heat 2 ===
Rank	Lane	Name	Nationality	Time	Notes
1	5	Nyree Kindred	Great Britain	1:27.96 PR	Q
2	4	Mirjam de Koning-Peper	Netherlands	1:29.86	Q
3	3	Julia Castello Farre	Spain	1:31.78	Q
4	6	Fuying Jiang	China	1:32.22	Q
5	2	Emanuela Romano	Italy	1:34.78	Q
6	7	Doramitzi Gonzalez	Mexico	1:39.32	
7	8	Noga Nir-Kistler	United States	1:46.26	
8	1	Sabine Weber-Treiber	Austria	1:50.25	

== Final ==
Rank	Lane	Name	Nationality	Time	Notes
1st place, gold medalist(s)	5	Lu Dong	China	1:24.71	WR
2nd place, silver medalist(s)	4	Nyree Kindred	Great Britain	1:26.23	
3rd place, bronze medalist(s)	3	Mirjam de Koning-Peper	Netherlands	1:29.04	
4	6	Oksana Khrul	Ukraine	1:29.95	
5	2	Julia Castello Farre	Spain	1:31.67	
6	7	Fuying Jiang	China	1:33.32	
7	8	Emanuela Romano	Italy	1:33.90	
8	1	Anastasia Diodorova	Russia	1:34.48	
