= 2018 World Para Swimming European Championships – Women's 50 metres butterfly =

The women's 50 metres butterfly at the 2018 World Para Swimming European Championships was held at the National Aquatic Centre in Dublin from 13 to 19 August. 3 classification finals were held in all over this event.

== Medalists ==
Event	Gold		Silver		Bronze	
S5	Giulia Ghiretti (ITA)	46.68	Sevilay Ozturk (TUR)	48.29	Sumeyye Boyaci (TUR)	48.90
S6	Eleanor Robinson (GBR)	35.37	Nicole Turner (IRL)	36.75	Oksana Khrul (UKR)	36.99
S7	Denise Grahl (GER)	39.36	Judit Rolo Marichal (ESP)	40.42	Nicola St Clair Maitland (SWE)	45.17
WR world record | AR area record | CR championship record | GR games record | NR national record | OR Olympic record | PB personal best | SB season best | WL world leading (in a given season)

== See also ==
- List of IPC world records in swimming
