= Swimming at the 2012 Summer Paralympics – Women's 50 metre butterfly S6 =

Women's 50 metre butterfly S6 at the XIV Paralympic Games
- Venue: London Aquatics Centre
- Dates: 7 September
- Competitors: 15 from 9 nations

Medalists
1st place, gold medalist(s)		Oksana Khrul	Ukraine
2nd place, silver medalist(s)		Dong Lu	China
3rd place, bronze medalist(s)		Fuying Jiang	China

The women's 50 metre butterfly S6 event at the 2012 Paralympic Games took place on 7 September, at the London Aquatics Centre.

Two heats were held, one with seven swimmers and the other with eight. The swimmers with the eight fastest times advanced to the final.

== Heats ==
=== Heat 1 ===
Rank	Lane	Name	Nationality	Time	Notes
1	3	Dong Lu	China	38.28	Q, AS
2	5	Inbal Schwartz	Israel	39.26	Q
3	4	Fuying Jiang	China	40.18	Q
4	2	Ozlem Baykiz	Turkey	41.05	Q
5	7	Noga Nir-Kistler	United States	41.33	
6	1	Doramitzi Gonzalez	Mexico	44.41	
7	6	Tanya Huebner	Australia	44.78	

=== Heat 2 ===
Rank	Lane	Name	Nationality	Time	Notes
1	4	Oksana Khrul	Ukraine	36.96	Q, WR
2	5	Anastasia Diodorova	Russia	39.71	Q
3	6	Sarah Rose	Australia	40.39	Q, OC
4	3	Olena Fedota	Ukraine	40.71	Q
5	2	Natalie Jones	Great Britain	41.97	
6	7	Vianney Trejo Delgadillo	Mexico	44.54	
7	1	Ileana Rodriguez	United States	45.90	
8	8	Karina Domingo Bello	Mexico	48.54	

== Final ==
Rank	Lane	Name	Nationality	Time	Notes
1st place, gold medalist(s)	4	Oksana Khrul	Ukraine	36.05	WR
2nd place, silver medalist(s)	5	Dong Lu	China	37.65	AS
3rd place, bronze medalist(s)	2	Fuying Jiang	China	39.26	
4	1	Olena Fedota	Ukraine	39.74	
5	3	Inbal Schwartz	Israel	39.89	
6	7	Sarah Rose	Australia	40.43	
7	6	Anastasia Diodorova	Russia	40.47	
8	8	Ozlem Baykiz	Turkey	42.91	
