= Swimming at the 2012 Summer Paralympics – Women's 100 metre breaststroke SB6 =

Women's 100m Breaststroke SB6 at the XIV Paralympic Games
- Venue: London Aquatics Centre
- Dates: 5 September
- Competitors: 10 from 8 nations
- Winning time: 1:39.13

Medalists
1st place, gold medalist(s)		Viktoriia Savtsova	Ukraine
2nd place, silver medalist(s)		Charlotte Henshaw	Great Britain
3rd place, bronze medalist(s)		Elizabeth Johnson	Great Britain

The women's 100m breaststroke SB6 event at the 2012 Summer Paralympics took place at the London Aquatics Centre on 5 September. There were two heats; the swimmers with the eight fastest times advanced to the final.

== Results ==
=== Heats ===
Competed from 11:12.

==== Heat 1 ====
Rank	Lane	Name	Nationality	Time	Notes
1	4	Elizabeth Johnson	Great Britain	1:41.09	Q, PR
2	5	Viktoriia Savtsova	Ukraine	1:41.22	Q
3	3	Ozlem Baykiz	Turkey	1:53.95	Q
4	2	Karina Domingo Bello	Mexico	1:56.58	Q
	6	Ke Liting	China	DSQ	

==== Heat 2 ====
Rank	Lane	Name	Nationality	Time	Notes
1	4	Charlotte Henshaw	Great Britain	1:39.64	Q, PR
2	5	Tanya Huebner	Australia	1:43.64	Q
3	6	Katrina Porter	Australia	1:53.63	Q
4	3	Oxana Guseva	Russia	1:54.36	Q
5	2	Marianne Fredbo	Norway	1:58.99	

=== Final ===
Competed at 19:31.

Rank	Lane	Name	Nationality	Time	Notes
1st place, gold medalist(s)	3	Viktoriia Savtsova	Ukraine	1:39.13	PR
2nd place, silver medalist(s)	4	Charlotte Henshaw	Great Britain	1:39.16	
3rd place, bronze medalist(s)	5	Elizabeth Johnson	Great Britain	1:40.90	
4	6	Tanya Huebner	Australia	1:42.45	
5	1	Oxana Guseva	Russia	1:49.41	
6	2	Katrina Porter	Australia	1:54.54	
7	7	Ozlem Baykiz	Turkey	1:54.60	
8	8	Karina Domingo Bello	Mexico	1:56.17	

'Q = qualified for final. PR = Paralympic Record. DSQ = Disqualified.
