= Özlem Kaya =

Özlem Kaya may refer to:

- Özlem Kaya (athlete) (born 1990), Turkish runner
- Özlem Kaya (swimmer) (born 1992), Turkish Paralympic swimmer
