= Mount Saint Patrick College =

Mount St Patrick College

Location
- 143 Murwillumbah Street, Murwillumbah, New South Wales; Australia; 28°19′34″S 153°23′38″E

Information
- Other name: Mt St Patrick College
- Former name: Mt St Patrick Regional High School
- Type: Independent co-educational secondary day school
- Motto: Latin: In Hoc Signo Spes Mea (In this sign is my hope)
- Denomination: Roman Catholic
- Patron saint: Saint Patrick
- Established: 1926; 100 years ago
- Founders: Presentation Sisters
- Oversight: Roman Catholic Diocese of Lismore
- Principal: Gavin Dykes
- Years: 7–12
- Enrolment: 900+
- Colors: Blue and yellow
- Website: http://www.mursclism.catholic.edu.au/

Mount Saint Patrick College, also known as Mt Saint Patrick College, is an independent Roman Catholic co-educational secondary day school, located in Murwillumbah, New South Wales, Australia, operating within the system administered by the Lismore Catholic Education Office, a subsidiary of the Roman Catholic Diocese of Lismore.

== History ==
Mt St Patrick caters to students in Year 7 to Year 12. It was opened in 1926 by the Presentation Sisters and was administered and staffed by them until 1989. It derives its name from St Patrick, the patron saint of Ireland, whose feast day is celebrated by both the college and local communities. In 1966, following the closure of other local Catholic secondary schools, the school became known as Mt St Patrick Regional High School, with 192 enrolled students. The appointment of the school's first lay Principal in 1990 ended 64 years of leadership by the Presentation Sisters, leading to the renaming of the school in 1998 to Mt St Patrick College. In 2011 the Australian Government's Economic Stimulus Package enabled the opening of the St Mary of the Cross Science and Language Centre. A record enrolment of 695 students was recorded in 2012. On 15 March 2013, the Gilbey Multipurpose Centre was officially opened, costing $6,230,256.

== Notable alumni ==
- Luke Covell, a former rugby league football player, in the NRL and New Zealand international codes
- PJ Hogan, an Australian film director
- Anthony Laffranchi, a former rugby league football player, in the NRL, Super League and Italian international codes
- Damien Quinn, a former rugby league football player, in the NRL, Super League code
- Kate Wilson, an Australian Paralympic swimmer

== See also ==
- Catholic education in Australia
- List of non-government schools in New South Wales
- List of schools in the Northern Rivers and Mid North Coast
