= Liz Johnson (swimmer) =

British Paralympic swimmer (born 1985)

Personal information
- Born: Elizabeth Johnson; 3 December 1985 (age 40) Newport, Wales, United Kingdom
- Home town: Bath, England, United Kingdom
- Education: Swansea University
- Occupation: Swimmer
- Height: 1.64 m (5 ft 5 in)

Sport
- Country: Great Britain
- Sport: Paralympic swimming
- Disability: Cerebral palsy
- Disability class: S6 classification
- Event(s): Breaststroke, Freestyle
- Club: Team Bath
- Coached by: Mark Skimming
Medal record
Representing Great Britain
Paralympic Games
Gold medal – first place	2008 Beijing	Women's SB6 100 m breaststroke
Silver medal – second place	2004 Athens	Women's SB6 100 m breaststroke
Bronze medal – third place	2012 London	Women's SB6 100 m breaststroke
IPC World Championships
Gold medal – first place	2006 Durban	SB6 100 m breaststroke
Gold medal – first place	2006 Durban	4x50 m freestyle
Gold medal – first place	2006 Durban	4x50 m medley
Bronze medal – third place	2010 Eindhoven	SB6 100 m breaststroke
IPC World Championships (SC)
Gold medal – first place	2009 Rio de Janeiro	SB6 100 m breaststroke
Bronze medal – third place	2009 Rio de Janeiro	SM6 200 m individual medley
Bronze medal – third place	2009 Rio de Janeiro	SM6 100 m individual medley
IPC European Championships
Gold medal – first place	2011 Berlin	SB6 100 m breaststroke
Silver medal – second place	2009 Reykjavik	SB6 100 m breaststroke
Bronze medal – third place	2001 Stockholm	200 m individual medley
- Updated on 12 September 2016

Elizabeth Johnson (born 3 December 1985) is a British swimmer who has won gold medals in the Paralympic Games and International Paralympic Committee (IPC) world championships. She has cerebral palsy, placing her in the S6 classification.

== Personal life ==
Johnson was born in Newport on 3 December 1985. She has cerebral palsy, and, at the age of three, was encouraged by her mother to join a group for disabled swimmers to strengthen and relax her muscles. She came to love the sport, competing as an S6 swimmer, and was selected to swim for Team GB at the age of 14. Johnson attended Swansea University and in 2008, completed a degree in business management and finance. She currently lives in Bath, Somerset, and trains with the University of Bath training group, Team Bath.

While Johnson was on the aeroplane to the 2008 Summer Paralympics in Beijing, her mother died after a long battle with cervical cancer. She decided to continue with the Games when she was told that the funeral could be held when she returned home.

Johnson spends one day a week studying accountancy, and is considering a career in that field when she retires from competitive swimming.

She has been in a relationship with Brazilian para-swimmer Phelipe Rodrigues since 2011.

In July 2016, Johnson appeared in the eleventh series of Celebrity Masterchef on BBC One.

She is an athlete mentor for the Dame Kelly Holmes Trust.

== Career ==
=== Swimming ===
Johnson is significant within the British Para Swimming Team; specialising in breaststroke, she is one of a select few to have won gold medals in the Paralympics, World Championships, and European Championships.

At the 2006 IPC Swimming World Championships in Durban, South Africa, Johnson won an individual gold medal in the 100 metre breaststroke, and two relay golds. She repeated her breaststroke success at the 2009 event, breaking the world record in the process, and also picked up two individual medley bronze medals. She won gold in the 100 metre breaststroke at the 2008 Summer Paralympics, eleven days after the death of her mother, dedicating the victory to her memory.

Johnson's successes were recognised when, in April 2011, she was given the honour of laying the final tile in the competition pool at the London Aquatics Centre. She was also selected as the Paralympic Oath taker for the 2012 Paralympic Games.

Johnson added to her Paralympic medal collection at London 2012 Paralympics, as she set a new Paralympic record en route. Johnson recorded a season's best time of 1:40.90, to take the bronze medal in the SB6 100 m backstroke. In the buildup towards her fourth Paralympics at Rio, Johnson underwent an operation for a hernia. While recovering, she found herself falling behind in her training, which impacted on her preparation for the 2016 Paralympic trials. Her failure to make the trials resulted in her decision to retire from competitive swimming.

=== Entrepreneurship ===
In August 2018, Johnson announced starting "The Ability People" an organization that is aimed at recruiting disabled people beside the able-bodied people without discrimination. In 2018, she was listed as one of the BBC's 100 Women.

== TV Career ==
Johnson was a Channel 4 pundit during Rio Paralympics Games in 2016.

In 2024, she was appointed as executive producer by Whisper TV to cover the 2024 Paris Paralympic Games.
