= Tanja Gröpper =

German Paralympic swimmer

Personal information
- Born: 5 March 1976 (age 50) Dortmund, Germany
- Home town: Düsseldorf, Germany
- Height: 175 cm (5 ft 9 in)
- Weight: 60 kg (132 lb)

Sport
- Country: Germany
- Sport: Para swimming
- Disability: Paraplegia
- Disability class: S6, SB4
- Retired: 2014
Medal record
Women's para swimming
Representing Germany
Paralympic Games
Bronze medal – third place	2012 London	100m freestyle S6
World Championships
Bronze medal – third place	2013 Montreal	100m freestyle S6
European Championships
Silver medal – second place	2011 Berlin	50m freestyle S6
Bronze medal – third place	2009 Reykjavik	50m freestyle S6
Bronze medal – third place	2009 Reykjavik	100m breaststroke SB4

Tanja Gröpper (also spelled Groepper, born 5 March 1976) is a retired German Paralympic swimmer who competed in freestyle swimming events in international level events.
