= Viktoriia Savtsova =

Ukrainian Paralympic swimmer

Personal information
- Nationality: Ukrainian
- Born: 10 December 1997 (age 28)

Sport
- Sport: Paralympic swimming
Medal record
Women's para swimming
Representing Ukraine
Summer Paralympics
| Gold medal – first place | 2012 London | 100 metre breaststroke S6 |
| Silver medal – second place | 2016 Rio | 50 metre freestyle S6 |
| Silver medal – second place | 2016 Rio | 100 metre freestyle S6 |
World Championships
| Gold medal – first place | 2013 Montreal | 50 metre freestyle |
| Silver medal – second place | 2013 Montreal | 100 metre breaststroke |
| Silver medal – second place | 2013 Montreal | 4x50 metre freestyle relay |
| Silver medal – second place | 2015 Glasgow | 100 metre freestyle |
| Silver medal – second place | 2015 Glasgow | 50 metre freestyle |

Viktoriia Savtsova (born 10 December 1997) is a Ukrainian Paralympic swimmer.

She competed at the 2012 Summer Paralympics, winning a gold medal in the 100 metre breaststroke S6 event, and at the 2016 Summer Paralympics where she won silver medals in the 50 metre freestyle S6, 100 metre freestyle S6 and 100 metre breaststroke SB5 events.

Savtsova also competed at the 2013 IPC Swimming World Championships where she broke the world record and won a gold medal in the 50 metre freestyle event and won silver medals in the 100 metre breaststroke event and the 4 x 50 metre freestyle relay. She also won silver medals in the 100 metre freestyle and 50 metre freestyle events at the 2015 Championships.
