= Özlem Kaya (swimmer) =

Turkish Paralympic swimmer (born 1992)

Personal information
- Nationality: Turkish
- Born: Özlem Baykız; 25 February 1992 (age 34) Kahramanmaraş, Turkey
- Height: 1.32 m (4 ft 4 in)
- Weight: 55 kg (121 lb)

Sport
- Sport: Swimming
- Strokes: Breasttroke, butterfly, freestyle
- Classifications: S6
- Club: İstanbul Büyükşehir Belediyesi S.K.
- Coach: Osman Çullu
Medal record
Paralympic swimming
Representing Turkey
European Championships
Bronze medal – third place	2011 Berlin	100m Breaststroke SB6

Özlem Kaya (born Özlem Baykız, 25 February 1992) is a Turkish female Paralympic swimmer. She competes in the disability category of S6 in breaststroke, butterfly and freestyle. She competed in the 2012 and 2016 Summer Paralympics.

== Personal history ==
Özlem Baykız was born in Kahramanmaraş on 25 February 1992. She is of short stature by birth defect. On 6 December 2012, she married Bayram Kaya, and changed her surname to her spouse's.

== Swimming career ==
Özlem had a secluded life in her childhood. She did not leave her home until she was discovered for swimming by Osman Çullu. and She began with swimming in 2004. She internationally debuted at the 2006 IPC Swimming World Championships held in Durban, Republic of South Africa. She won her first medal, a bronze in the 100m Breaststroke SB6 event at the 2011 IPC Swimming European Championships in Berlin, Germany. She was qualified for the 2012 Summer Paralympics, and represented her country in London, United Kingdom. Kaya participated at the 2016 Summer Paralympics in Rio de Janeiro, Brazil. She took part at the World Championships in 3006, 3010, 3015 and competed at European Championships in 2011, 2014, 2016.

Kaya's disability swimming classification is S6 according to her short stature by birth defect. Currently, the 1.32 m (4 ft 4 in) tall Para swimmer at 55 kg (121 lb) competes for İstanbul Büyükşehir Belediyesi S.K. Before her marriage, end 2012, she was known in the competitions under her maiden name Baykız.

== Achievements ==
Competition	Place	Event	Rank	Time	Ref
2006 World Championships	South Africa, Durban	50m Butterflye S6	11	1:09.96	
2006 World Championships	South Africa, Durban	50m Freestyle S6	11	47.64	
2006 World Championships	South Africa, Durban	100m Backstroke S6	12	2:13.94	
2006 World Championships	South Africa, Durban	100m Freestyle S6	12	1:45.62	
2010 World Championships	Netherlands, Eindhoven	50m Butterflye S6	11	48.27	
2010 World Championships	Netherlands, Eindhoven	50m Freestyle S6	12	40.40	
2010 World Championships	Netherlands, Eindhoven	100m Breaststroke SB6	6	1:55.52	
2010 World Championships	Netherlands, Eindhoven	100m Freestyle S6	11	1:29.33	
2010 World Championships	Netherlands, Eindhoven	100m Individual Medley SM6	12	3:42.38	
2011 European Championships	Germany, Berlin	50m Freestyle S6	7	39.12	
2011 European Championships	Germany, Berlin	100m Breaststroke SB6	3rd place, bronze medalist(s)	1:51.10	
2011 European Championships	Germany, Berlin	200m Individual Medley SM6	8	3:39.63	
2012 Paralympic Games	United Kingdom, London	50 m Butterfly S6	8	42.91	
2012 Paralympic Games	United Kingdom, London	50 m Freestyle S6	8	37.39	
2012 Paralympic Games	United Kingdom, London	100 m Breaststroke SB6	7	1:54.60	
2012 Paralympic Games	United Kingdom, London	100m Freestyle S6	Heats	1:29.64	
2012 Paralympic Games	United Kingdom, London	200 m Individual Medley SM6	Heats	3:39.14	
2012 Paralympic Games	United Kingdom, London	400 m Freestyle S6	Heats	6:46.50	
2014 European Championships	Netherlands, Eindhoven	100m Freestyle S6	7	1:30.18	
2015 World Championships	United Kingdom, Glasgow	50m Butterfly S6	8	41.39	
2015 World Championships	United Kingdom, Glasgow	50m Freestyle S6	Heats	38.07	
2015 World Championships	United Kingdom, Glasgow	100m Breaststroke SB6	8	1:56.47	
2016 Paralympic Games	Brazil, Rio de Janeiro	50 m Butterfly S5	6	40.60	
2016 Paralympic Games	Brazil, Rio de Janeiro	50 m Freestyle S5	17	39.20	
2016 Paralympic Games	Brazil, Rio de Janeiro	100 m Breaststroke SB6	Heats	1:52.15	
2016 European Championships	Portugal, Funchal	50 m Butterfly S6	7	40.97	
2016 European Championships	Portugal, Funchal	50 m Freestyle S6	8	39.21	
2016 European Championships	Portugal, Funchal	100 m Breaststroke SB6	5	1:51.89	
