= Kate Wilson (swimmer) =

Australian Paralympic swimmer (born 1998)

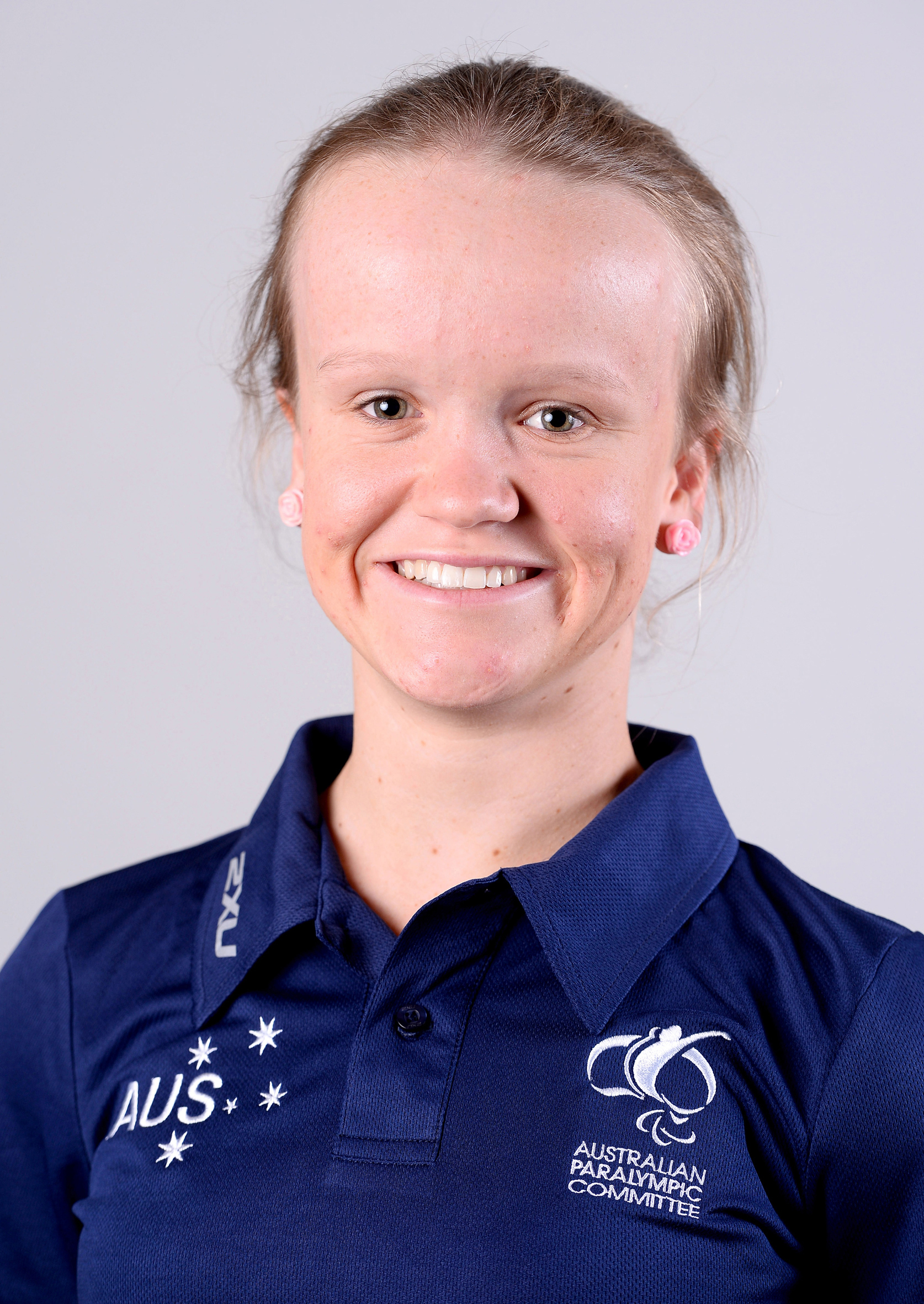
- 2016 Australian Paralympic team portrait

Personal information
- Full name: Katie Wilson
- Nationality: Australia
- Born: 4 June 1998 (age 28)

Sport
- Sport: Swimming
- Classifications: S6
- Club: Kingscliff Swimming Club
- Coach: Dwain Fitzsimmons

Katie (Kate) Wilson (born 4 June 1998) is an Australian Paralympic swimmer. She represented Australia at the 2016 Rio Paralympics.

== Personal ==
Wilson was born on 4 June 1998 with achondroplasia, a form of dwarfism that affects the upper and lower limbs. She is the oldest of three children and has one sister and one brother. For primary school, she attended St Anthony's Catholic Primary School in Kingscliff where she has lived for the majority of her life. For high school she attended Mount Saint Patrick's College Mount Saint Patrick College in Murwillumbah and undertook her HSC in 2016. As of 2018 she is undertaking a Bachelor of Vision Science/Master of Optometry at the University of New South Wales in Sydney.

Her grandfather Kevin Wilson played for the St George Dragons 1952 to 1955 and her uncle Martin O'Connell played for the Penrith Panthers from 1999 to 2001. Her mother Susan Wilson was also a member of the Australian University Netball Team.

== Swimming ==
Wilson took swimming as a child at the advice of a paediatrician and has been swimming all her life. At the age of 13, she began to take swimming more seriously. She is classified as a S6 swimmer. She is 129 cm tall and just qualifies for S6 limit of 130 cm. In 2012, she attended an AIS "Road to Rio" camp for junior developing swimmers that provided her with the motivation and the dream to strive for the 2016 Paralympics. At the 2013 Australian Swimming Championships she won a silver medal in the Women's 50m Breaststroke. In 2016, after three years, she recorded a personal best time in the same event and won a bronze medal. From 2013 to 2016 she trained Kingscliff Swimming Club under the guidance of Coach Dwain Fitzsimmons.

She made her international debut at the Berlin Open Swimming Championships in June 2016. At the 2016 Rio Paralympic Games, she competed in four individual events and one relay. Her individual events included the women's 50m freestyle S6, 100m freestyle S6, 100m breaststroke SB6 and 200m individual medley SM6. She was also a heat swimmer for the 4x50 freestyle relay 20pts. She made the final of the 100m Breaststroke and placed 7th.

In 2017 she was awarded Sportsperson of the Year for the Tweed Shire Council.
