= Oksana Khrul =

Ukrainian Paralympic swimmer (born 1995)

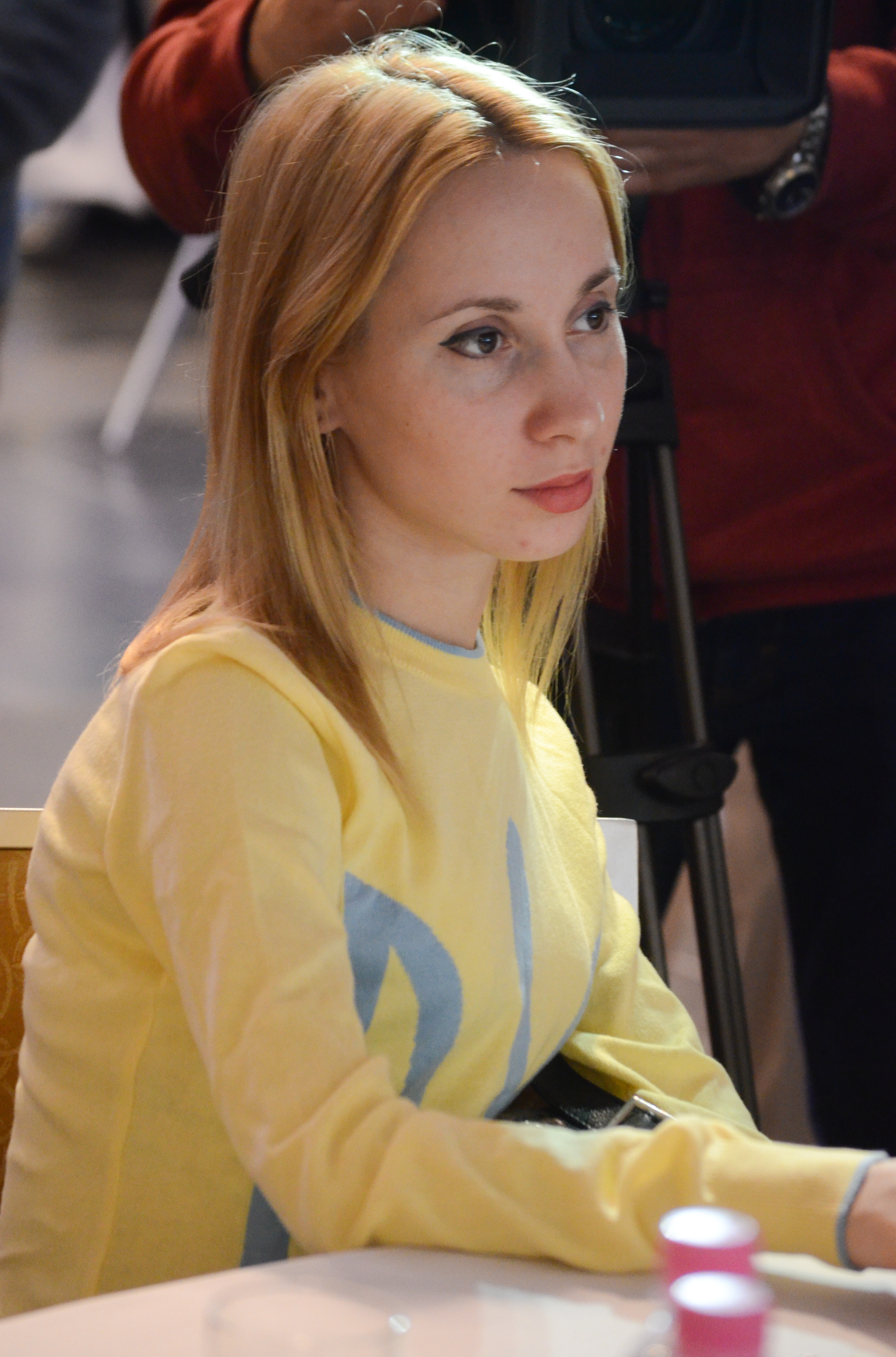
- Oksana Khrul in 2016

Personal information
- Nickname: Ksyusha
- Nationality: Ukrainian
- Born: 29 March 1995 (age 31)
- Height: 1.68 m (5 ft 6 in)
- Weight: 44 kg (97 lb)

Sport
- Sport: Swimming
- Strokes: Backstroke, Breaststroke, Butterfly, Freestyle
- Coach: Galyna Boyko
Medal record
Women's swimming
Representing Ukraine
Paralympic Games
Gold medal – first place	2012 London	50m butterfly S6
Silver medal – second place	2012 London	100m breaststroke SB7
Silver medal – second place	2016 Rio de Janeiro	50m butterfly S6
Bronze medal – third place	2016 Rio de Janeiro	100m backstroke S6
IPC Swimming World Championships
Gold medal – first place	2010 Eindhoven	50m butterfly S6
Silver medal – second place	2010 Eindhoven	4 x 50m Medley Relay
Gold medal – first place	2013 Montreal	50m butterfly S6
Gold medal – first place	2013 Montreal	4 x 50m Medley Relay
Bronze medal – third place	2013 Montreal	100m Breaststroke SB7
Bronze medal – third place	2013 Montreal	200m Individual Medley SM6
Gold medal – first place	2015 Glasgow	50m Butterfly S6
Silver medal – second place	2015 Glasgow	100m Backstroke S6
Bronze medal – third place	2015 Glasgow	100m Breaststroke SB7
IPC European Championships
Gold medal – first place	2016 Funchal	50m butterfly S6
Gold medal – first place	2016 Funchal	100m Breaststroke SB7
Gold medal – first place	2016 Funchal	4 x 50m Medley Relay
Silver medal – second place	2016 Funchal	100m Backstroke S6
Gold medal – first place	2018 Dublin	100m Breaststroke SB7
Bronze medal – third place	2018 Dublin	50m Butterfly S6

Oksana Khrul (born 29 March 1995) is a Ukrainian para-swimmer, competing in S6, SM6 and SB7 categories.

With limited use of her arms, Khrul has won medals in the World Para Swimming Championships, Paralympics, and the IPC European Championships. She set a World record at the 2012 Paralympics, and World and European records at the 2016 Paralympics, all in the 50m butterfly S6 event, and has three times received national honours in her native Ukraine.

== Personal life ==
Oksana Khrul was born with arthrogryposis, a congenital musculo-skeletal condition characterised by underdeveloped joints and muscles, which leaves her with limited use of her arms.

She started swimming at the age of nine after being taken to a pool by her mother.

== Career ==
Khrul made her senior competitive debut in 2009 at the European Championships in Reykjavic, Iceland.

=== Paralympic Games ===
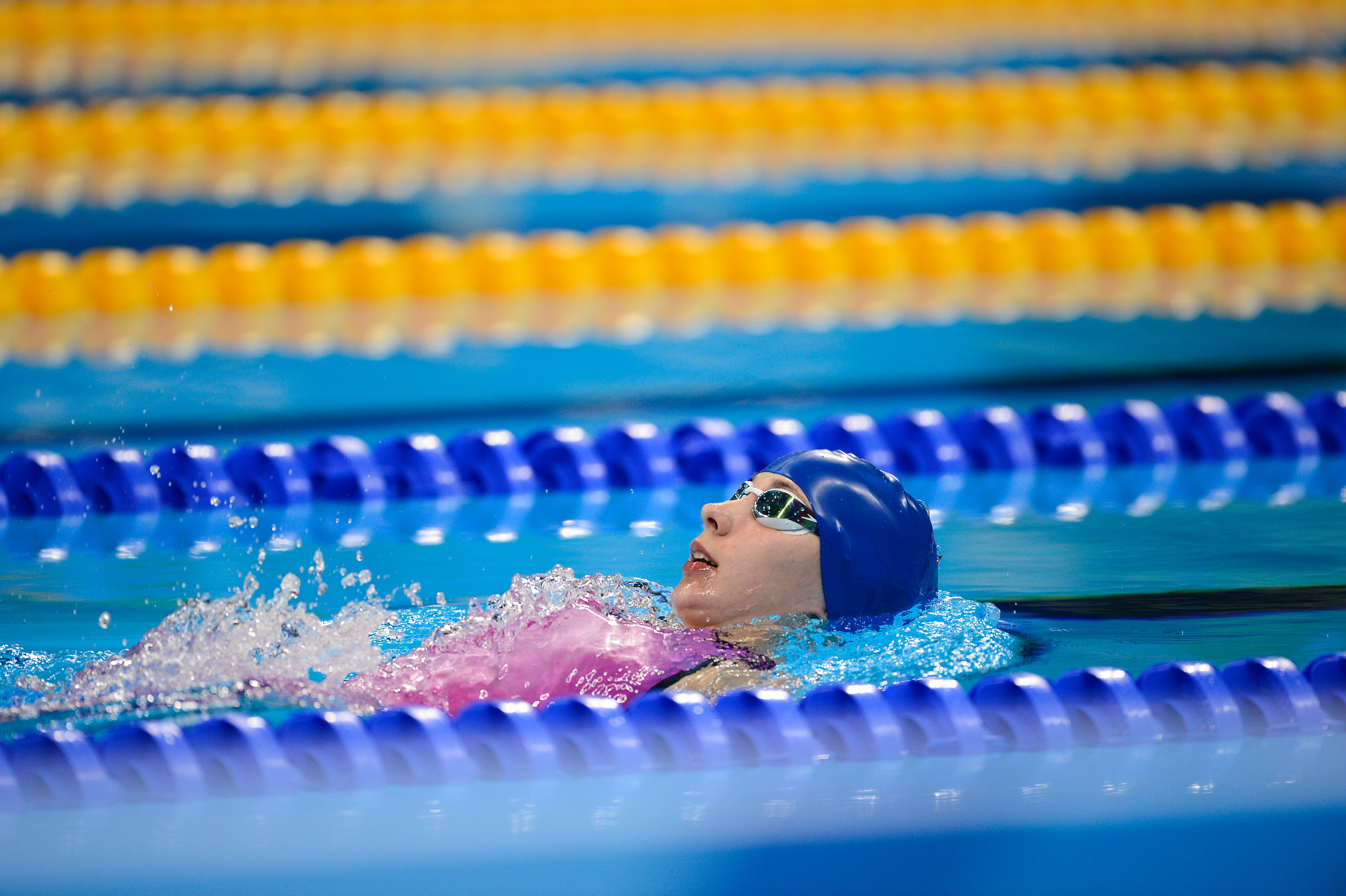
Oksana Khrul on her way to the 100m S6 bronze medal at the 2016 Paralympics

==== 2012 Paralympics ====
At the Paralympic Games, Khrul continued her dominance of the 50m butterfly S6 event by taking gold at the 2012 London games with a new World record of 36.05 seconds, ahead of China's Dong Lu and Fuying Jiang. In the final, Khrul beat her previous World record of 36.96 set in her heat at the same event.

Khrul also took the 2012 100m breaststroke SB7 silver medal, behind gold medal winner Jessica Long of the US and ahead of Lisa den Braber of The Netherlands.

==== 2016 Paralympics ====
At the 2016 Rio de Janeiro games, Khrul took the 50m butterfly S6 silver medal, beaten by 0.87 seconds by the UK's Ellie Robinson in gold medal position with a new Paralympics record, and ahead of Australia's Tiffany Thomas Kane.

Khrul also took the 100m backstroke S6 bronze medal at the Rio games, behind Chinese swimmers Song Lingling and Lu Dong in gold and silver positions respectively.

=== IPC Swimming World Championships ===
At the 2010 IPC Swimming World Championships in Eindhoven, Netherlands, Khrul won the gold medal in the individual 50m butterfly S6 event, and took silver as part of the Ukraine women's 4 x 50m Medley Relay squad.

At the 2013 Championships in Montreal, Canada, she successfully defended her 50m butterfly S6 title, and in the 4 x 50m Medley Relay her team beat their 2010 achievement to win the gold medal. Khrul also took bronze medals in the 100m Breaststroke SB7 and 200m Individual Medley SM6 events.

The 2015 Championships in Glasgow, Scotland, saw Khrul repeat her defence of her 50m butterfly S6 title to make it three in a row, and she added the 100m Backstroke S6 silver and 100m Breaststroke SB7 bronze medals to her wins that year.

=== IPC European Championships ===
At the 2016 IPC Swimming European Championships in Funchal, Portugal, Khrul once again won gold in the 50m butterfly S6, this time in world record pace. She finished ahead of Britain's Ellie Robinson in silver medal position, with Ireland's Nicole Turner taking bronze.

Khrul also took two more gold medals in the 100m Breaststroke SB7 and the 4 x 50m Medley Relay, and a silver medal in the 100m Backstroke S6 event.

At the renamed 2018 World Para Swimming European Championships in Dublin, Khrul won gold at the Women's 100m Breaststroke SB7, with Vendula Duskova of the Czech Republic in silver medal position and Great Britain's Megan Richter in bronze.

Khrul won bronze in the Women's 50m Butterfly S6, behind Great Britain's Ellie Robinson on gold and Nicole Turner of Ireland who took silver.

=== Records ===
Khrul first set a new World record of 36.96 seconds in her heat at the 50m butterfly S6 at the 2012 London Paralympic games, and then broke that record again in the final with a time of 36.05 seconds.

In winning the Women's 50m Butterfly S6 at the 2016 IPC Swimming European Championships in Funchal, she set new European and World records with a time of 35.48 seconds.

== National awards ==
In 2012, Khrul was awarded the Order of Merit third class for her achievements at the 2012 Paralympic Games in London, and in 2016 she was awarded the Order of Merit second class for her achievements at the 2016 Paralympic Games in Rio de Janeiro, both by decree of President Petro Poroshenko of Ukraine.

In 2018, Khrul received the Honoured Master of Sport in Ukraine title.
