= Ellie Robinson =

British Paralympic swimmer (born 2001)

Ellie Robinson MBE
Personal information
- Full name: Eleanor Robinson
- Nickname: Ellie
- Nationality: British
- Born: 30 August 2001 (age 25) Northampton, England
- Height: 1.22 m (4 ft)

Sport
- Sport: Swimming
- Strokes: Butterfly, Freestyle
- Club: Northampton Swimming Club
- Coach: Andy Sharp (club)
Medal record
Women's para swimming
Representing Great Britain
Paralympic Games
Gold medal – first place	2016 Rio de Janeiro	50m butterfly S6
Bronze medal – third place	2016 Rio de Janeiro	100m freestyle S6
European Championships
Silver medal – second place	2016 Funchal	50m butterfly S6
Bronze medal – third place	2016 Funchal	50m freestyle S6
Bronze medal – third place	2016 Funchal	100m freestyle S6
Bronze medal – third place	2016 Funchal	400m freestyle S6
Gold medal – first place	2018 Dublin	50m butterfly S6
Silver medal – second place	2018 Dublin	100m freestyle S6
Representing England
Commonwealth Games
Gold medal – first place	2018 Gold Coast	50m butterfly S7

Eleanor "Ellie" Robinson (born 30 August 2001) is an English retired swimmer. Competing in SB6 and S6 classification events, Robinson holds the World record and the Paralympic record in the S6 50m butterfly and the World record in the 100m, setting both at the age of 13.

In 2016, Robinson won four medals at the 2016 IPC Swimming European Championships. She followed this success at the Rio Paralympics in 2016, where she won the gold medal in the women's S6 50m butterfly event and bronze in the women's S6 100m freestyle event. She became known for her "gangsta swagger" as she entered the pool in her oversized coat with its hood up.

On 14 December 2016, it was announced that she had won the BBC Young Sports Personality of the Year.

Robinson was recognised in the 2017 New Year Honours, being appointed Member of the Most Excellent Order of the British Empire (MBE) for services to swimming.

Having competed at the delayed 2020 Paralympics, Robinson announced her retirement from competitive swimming in October 2021.

== Personal life ==
Robinson was born in 2001 with a rare type of dwarfism cartilage hair hypoplasia and lives in Northampton, England, where she was formerly a pupil of Northampton High School. In November 2012 she was diagnosed with Perthes hip disease which requires her to undergo daily physiotherapy.

== Swimming career ==
Robinson learned to swim at the age of four, and joined Northampton Swimming Club in 2012. She stopped training after 2 months (having been diagnosed with Perthes disease), but returned to the pool in 2014. In 2014 Robinson was enrolled into the British Swimming's World Class Podium Potential Programme.

She made her senior international debut for Great Britain at the 2015 International Deutsche Meisterschaften in Berlin. At the tournament she set a world record in the 100m butterfly, with a time of 1:26.30. She followed this with a silver in the 50m butterfly, in which she improved on her own British record, and a bronze in the 200m butterfly.

In 2016, in the build up to the Summer Paralympics in Rio, Robinson again improved upon her British 50m butterfly record, finishing in 36.34 and taking the gold medal. This was also under the time for consideration for Paralympic qualification. She followed this with her first major international tournament, representing Great Britain at the 2016 IPC Swimming European Championships in Funchal. There Robinson entered five events, winning medals in four of them. In the 200m Individual Medley (SM6) she finished fourth, but took bronze medals in the 50m, 100m and 400m freestyle events. In the 50m butterfly she was beaten into second place by the then Paralympic champion, Oksana Khrul of Ukraine. Khrul, who set the then 50m world record of 36.05 at the 2012 Summer Paralympics in London, improved her time with a result of 35.48. Robinson's silver medal time was 35.66, also under the 2012 World record.

Robinson won the gold medal in the women's S6 50m butterfly event at the 2016 Paralympics in Rio de Janeiro, in a new Paralympics record time of 35.58 seconds, beating 2012 champion Oksana Khrul into second place. She also won a bronze in the 100m equivalent at the same Games.

Robinson won the gold medal in the women's S7 50m butterfly event at the 2018 Commonwealth Games, beating Canadian Sarah Mehainl into second place.

At the 2018 World Para Swimming European Championships in Dublin, Robinson won the women's S6 50m butterfly gold, ahead of Ireland's Nicole Turner and Ukraine's Oksana Khrul.
