= Victoria Arlen =

American sports television personality and former Paralympic swimmer (born 1994)

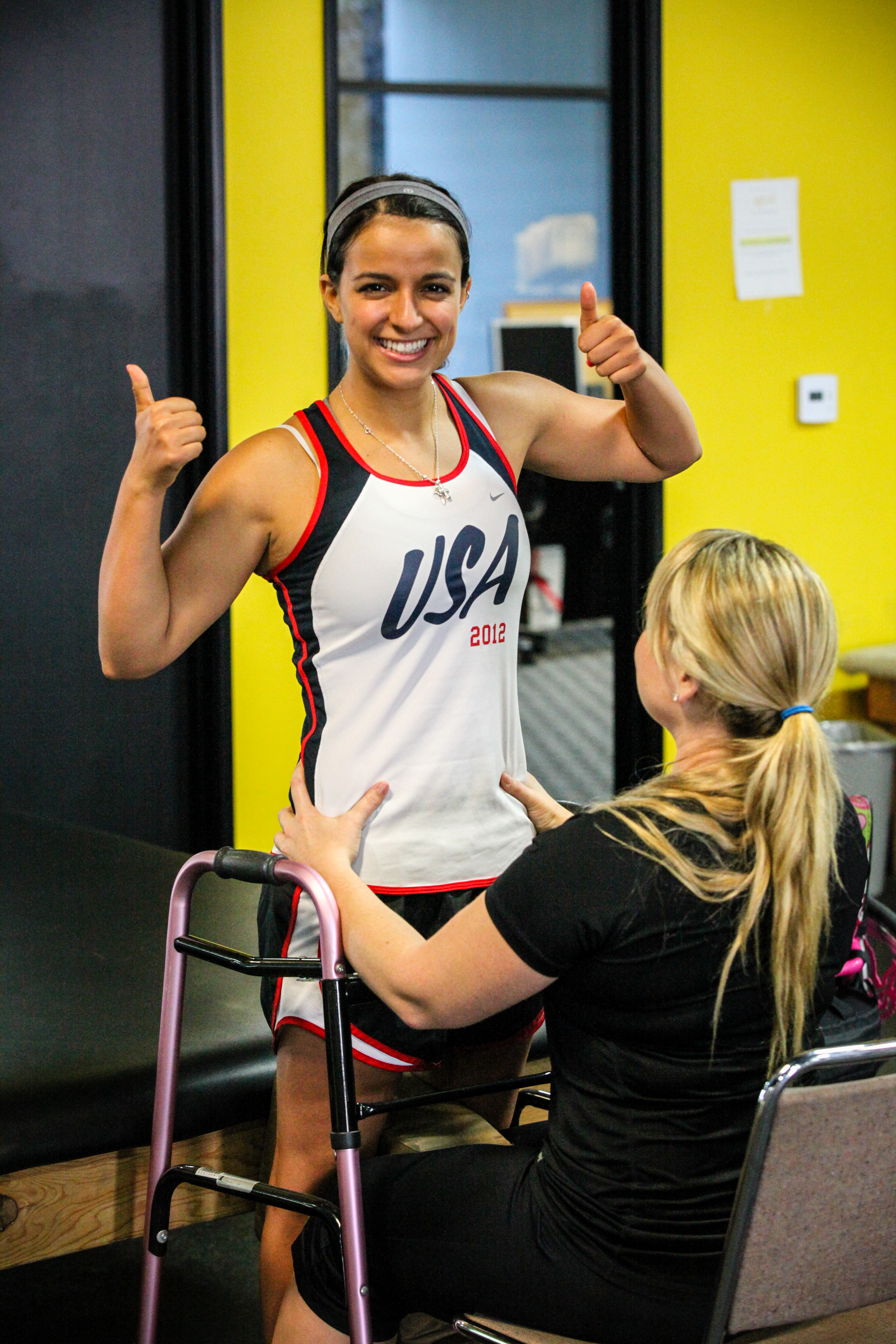
- Arlen on her road to recovery at Project Walk in San Diego in 2013

Personal information
- Born: September 26, 1994 (age 32) Exeter, New Hampshire, U.S.

Sport
- Sport: Swimming
- Strokes: Freestyle, breaststroke
- Club: North Shore Sharks
Medal record
Women's swimming
Representing United States
Paralympic Games
Gold medal – first place	2012 London	100 m freestyle S6
Silver medal – second place	2012 London	400 m freestyle S6
Silver medal – second place	2012 London	4x100 m freestyle relay – 34 points
Silver medal – second place	2012 London	50 m freestyle S6

Victoria Arlen (born September 26, 1994) is an American television personality for ESPN, as well as an actress, speaker, model, and former American paralympian swimmer.

== Early life ==
Victoria was born in New Hampshire, USA, to Larry and Jacqueline Arlen on September 26, 1994, as one of triplets; she has two brothers. Her father played hockey for the Quinnipiac Bobcats, and her brothers grew up playing it as well.

Arlen, at the age of eleven, developed two rare conditions known as transverse myelitis and acute disseminated encephalomyelitis. This was an extremely rare scenario, and Victoria quickly lost the ability to speak, eat, walk, and move. She slipped into a vegetative state from which recovery was thought unlikely. Arlen spent nearly four years "locked" inside her own body, completely aware of what was going on, just unable to move or communicate. Doctors believed there was little hope of survival, and recovery was unlikely.

In 2010, at age 15, after almost four years, a new medication eased the seizures and Arlen began to communicate. Arlen began re-learning how to speak, eat, and move.

BBC Outlook Weekend related her story in an interview with Harry Graham; Arlen described being able to hear what others said while she herself could not communicate in any way during her years of the worst phases of the diseases. Strangers were often negative in their assessment of her chance of survival, which words she heard. She described the support of her family as essential in every phase of the diseases and her recovery; they never gave up on her. After a doctor tried a medication that eased the seizures she endured, she gained her first ability to respond in communication with her mother. She had loved to swim before the diseases struck; her brothers took her to a pool to restart her in swimming, well before she could walk. She took up the challenge of swimming in the Paralympics in Summer of 2012, just over a year after her brothers first put her in a pool.

In June 2012, after a world record-breaking performance at the 2012 Summer Paralympics US swimming trials, Arlen qualified for the 2012 Summer Paralympics held in London, as a member of Team USA. In London, she won four medals: one gold and three silver.

In 2013, she was deemed not disabled enough to compete in the Paralympics because she did not provide significant proof that she has a permanent disability. The decision came as she was in Montreal, ready to compete. Paralympic rules include competitors with permanent disability, which is a complex decision. Her doctor thought there was a chance she might recover in the future, and the Paralympic committee decided evidence of permanent disability was lacking. It was difficult for Arlen not to be allowed to compete, her family contested it, but the decision stood. She was allowed to keep the medals she won in 2012, an acknowledgement that there was no deception by the athlete.

== Career ==
In April 2015, Arlen made the transition from professional athlete to sportscaster and joined ESPN as one of the youngest on-air talents hired by the company.

By April 2016, she had learned to walk after spending nearly a decade paralyzed from the waist down. In 2017, she reported having no sensation in her legs.

On September 6, 2017, Arlen was announced as one of the celebrities who would compete on the 25th season of Dancing with the Stars. She was partnered with professional dancer, Valentin Chmerkovskiy. The couple managed to reach the semi-finals, but was ultimately eliminated and placed fifth in the competition.

In 2020, Arlen became a co-host of American Ninja Warrior Junior for its second season, replacing Laurie Hernandez as the latter prepared for the 2020 Summer Olympics before it was postponed to 2021. She is one of the co-hosts of SportsNation.

== Personal life ==
Arlen is a Christian. She grew up as a Christian. When she was in her ‘locked-in’ state from her rare conditions, she prayed to God on a daily basis. She made a promise to God in prayer for her recovery. She has spoken of the importance of her faith in her life.
