= Lu Dong =

Chinese Paralympic swimmer (born 1991)

Lu Dong 卢冬
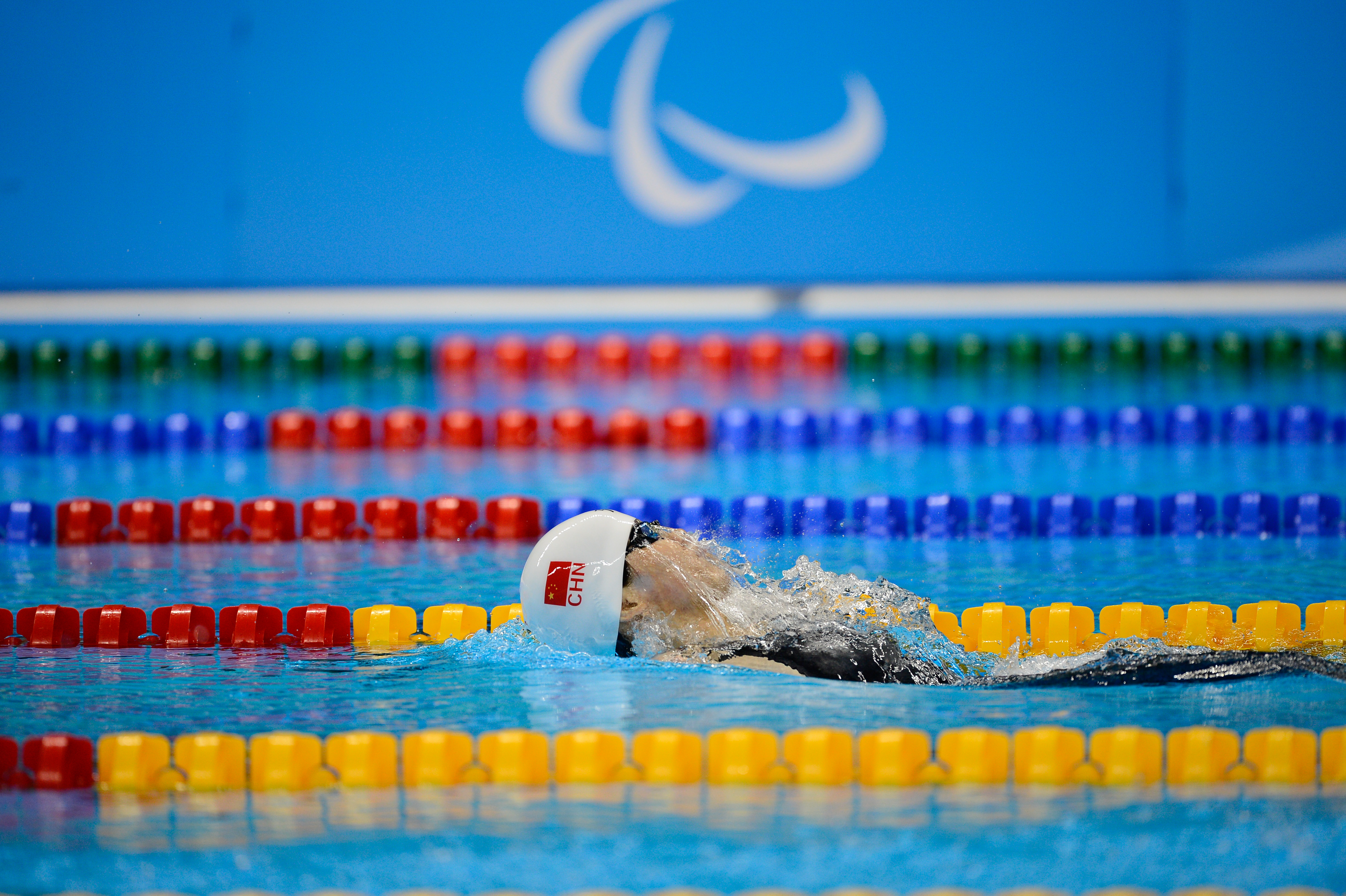
- Lu at the Rio 2016 Summer Paralympics

Personal information
- Nickname: Armless Mermaid
- National team: China
- Born: 19 December 1991 (age 34) Chaoyang

Sport
- Sport: Swimming
- Classifications: S5/SB6/SM5
- Club: Liaoning Province
- Coach: Li Jianhui
Medal record
Women's Paralympic swimming
Representing China
Summer Paralympics
Gold medal – first place	2012 London	100 m backstroke S6
Gold medal – first place	2020 Tokyo	Mixed 4 × 50 m freestyle relay 20pts
Gold medal – first place	2020 Tokyo	50 m Butterfly S5
Gold medal – first place	2020 Tokyo	50 m backstroke S5
Gold medal – first place	2020 Tokyo	200 m ind. medley SM5
Gold medal – first place	2024 Paris	50 m backstroke S5
Gold medal – first place	2024 Paris	50 m butterfly S5
Gold medal – first place	2024 Paris	Mixed 4×50 m freestyle relay 20 pts
Gold medal – first place	2024 Paris	Mixed 4×50 m medley relay 20pts
Silver medal – second place	2012 London	50 m butterfly S6
Silver medal – second place	2016 Rio de Janeiro	100 m backstroke S6
Silver medal – second place	2024 Paris	200 m ind. medley SM5
World Championships
Gold medal – first place	2010 Eindhoven	4 x 50m Medley Relay 20 Points
Gold medal – first place	2015 Glasgow	100m backstroke S6
Gold medal – first place	2023 Manchester	50m backstroke S5
Gold medal – first place	2023 Manchester	50m butterfly S5
Silver medal – second place	2013 Montreal	100m backstroke S6
Silver medal – second place	2015 Glasgow	50m butterfly S6
Bronze medal – third place	2013 Montreal	4×100m medley relay - 34 points
Bronze medal – third place	2023 Manchester	50m freestyle S5
Bronze medal – third place	2023 Manchester	200m medley SM5

Lu Dong (born 19 December 1991) is a Chinese Paralympic swimmer, who won gold and silver medals at the 2012 Summer Paralympics and a silver medal at the 2016 Summer Paralympics. She recorded 38.28 seconds in the 50m butterfly. At the 2020 Summer Paralympics she won four gold medals with three world records. Lu lost both her arms after being hit by a motorist at age six.

== Swimming career ==
During her career, Lu has received the May 1st Labour Medal, the May 4th Youth Medal and has been named a March 8 Red Banner Pacesetter in the People's Republic of China.

Major achievements:

WR: World Record

- 2012: Won gold at the 2012 Paralympics in London in the Women's 100 metre backstroke S6, and silver in the Women's 50m butterfly S6.
- 2016: Won silver in the Women's 100 metre backstroke S6 at the 2016 Rio de Janeiro Paralympics.
- 2021 Won Gold in the Mixed 4 × 50 metre freestyle relay 20pts alongside team members Zhang Li 36.22, Toe Zheng 1:06.70, Yuan Weiyi 1:38.08, Lu Dong 2:15.49 with comdined team WR 2:15.49 at the 2020 Summer Paralympics in Tokyo, Japan. Won Gold in the Women's 50 metre butterfly S5 with WR 39.54. Won Gold in the Women's 50 metre backstroke S5 with WR 37.18.
