= Nicole Turner =

Irish Paralympic swimmer (born 2002)

Personal information
- Nationality: Irish
- Born: 14 June 2002 (age 24) Portarlington, County Laois, Ireland

Sport
- Country: Ireland
- Sport: Para-swimming
- Disability class: S6, SB6, SM6
- Events: freestyle, butterfly, individual medley, breaststroke
Medal record
Women's para-swimming
Representing Ireland
Summer Paralympics
Silver medal – second place	2020 Tokyo	50 m butterfly S6
World Championships
Bronze medal – third place	2022 Madeira	50 m butterfly S6
European Championships
Gold medal – first place	2024 Madeira	50m freestyle S6
Silver medal – second place	2024 Madeira	50m butterfly S6
Bronze medal – third place	2024 Madeira	200m IM SM6
Bronze medal – third place	2024 Madeira	100m breastroke SB6

Nicole Turner (born 14 June 2002), of Portarlington, County Laois, is a retired Irish para-swimmer, competing mainly in the S6, short stature category.

Turner has won medals in the youth category at the 2015 British International, senior at the 2016 IPC Swimming European Open Championships and the 2018 European Para-Swimming Championships, and in the youth final in the World Para Swimming Series in 2019.

== Personal life ==
Turner was born with hypochondroplasia, making her of short stature. Nicole started swimming with her local club, Portarlington Piranhas, before moving to Laois Marlins in Portlaoise. She moved to train with Ireland's top swimmers at the National Aquatic Centre in Dublin in 2017. In 2019, after completing transition year, she deferred her secondary school studies to train fulltime for Tokyo. Nicole was the flagbearer for Team Ireland at the Rio Paralympics closing ceremony.

== Career ==
Turner represented Ireland for the first time at a senior level at the 2015 British Para-Swimming International Meet, 26–29 March, where she placed fifth in the women's MC 50m butterfly. She won a silver medal in the Youth category in the 50m butterfly.

=== Paralympic Games ===
Turner competed in five events at the 2016 Summer Paralympics in Rio de Janeiro. Her best placing was fifth in 50m butterfly S6, an event in which Ellie Robinson won gold, Oksana Khrul silver, and Australia's Tiffany Thomas Kane bronze. She was the youngest member of the Ireland team and was selected as the closing ceremony flag-bearer.

Turner competed at the 2020 Summer Paralympics in Tokyo and won a silver medal in the women's 50 metre butterfly S6.

=== IPC Swimming World Championships ===
At the IPC Swimming World Championships in Glasgow in July 2015, at the age of 13, Turner reached the final in each of the six events she entered, setting personal bests in each. She finished fifth in the S6 400m freestyle, fifth in the SB6 100m breaststroke, sixth in the S6 50m butterfly, sixth in the S6 50m freestyle, eighth in the S6 200m individual medley, and seventh in the S6 100m freestyle.

=== IPC Swimming European Championships ===
At the 2016 IPC Swimming European Championships in Funchal, 30 April - 7 May, Turner reach the finals in six events and took home three medals. She won silver in the 200m Individual Medley SM6 behind Ukraine's Yelyzaveta Mereshko, silver in the 100m Breaststroke SB6 behind Charlotte Henshaw of Great Britain, and bronze in the 50m Butterfly S6 behind Oksana Khrul (Ukraine) in gold medal position and Ellie Robinson (Great Britain) on bronze. In her other events, she placed fifth in the 100m Freestyle S6, sixth in the 50m Freestyle S6, and fourth in the 400m Freestyle S6.

==== World Para Swimming European Championships ====
In the 2018 World Para Swimming European Championships (renamed that year), Turner won silver in the 50m butterfly, as Ellie Robinson took gold.

=== 2024 ===
To begin the Paralympic year Nicole took part in Para Swimming European Championships 2024 Nicole in the 200m IM won Bronze while teammate Dearbhaile Brady Finished 5th two days later in the 50m freestyle Nicole became European champion winning gold finishing tied 1st with Nora Meister while Dearbhaile Brady won her first major championship medal winning bronze. One day later Nicole won a Bronze in the 100m Breastroke.

Nicole Retired Professionally from Para Swimming in January 2025 at the age of 22
