= Sophia Herzog =

American Paralympic swimmer (born 1997)

Personal information
- Full name: Sophia Elizabeth Herzog
- Nationality: United States
- Born: March 20, 1997 (age 29) Denver, Colorado, U.S.

Sport
- Sport: Swimming
- Strokes: Breaststroke
Medal record
Women's swimming
Representing United States
Paralympic Games
Silver medal – second place	2016 Rio de Janeiro	100 m breaststroke SB6
Bronze medal – third place	2020 Tokyo	100 m breaststroke SB6
World Championships
Gold medal – first place	2017 Mexico City	100m breaststroke SB6
Gold medal – first place	2017 Mexico City	4x100m medley relay
Silver medal – second place	2017 Mexico City	200m individual medley SM6
Silver medal – second place	2022 Madeira	100m breaststroke SB6
Bronze medal – third place	2017 Mexico City	100m freestyle S6
Bronze medal – third place	2017 Mexico City	100m backstroke S6
Parapan American Games
Silver medal – second place	2015 Toronto	100m breaststroke SB6
Silver medal – second place	2015 Toronto	200m individual medley SM6
Silver medal – second place	2015 Toronto	4x50m freestyle relay
Bronze medal – third place	2015 Toronto	50m freestyle S6

Sophia Elizabeth Herzog (born March 20, 1997) is an American swimmer. She won a medal at the 2016 Paralympic Games. She competes in the Paralympic class SB6. She was named to the US National team in 2019.

== Career ==
On April 14, 2022, Herzog was named to the roster to represent the United States at the 2022 World Para Swimming Championships.
