= Tanya Huebner =

Australian Paralympic swimmer

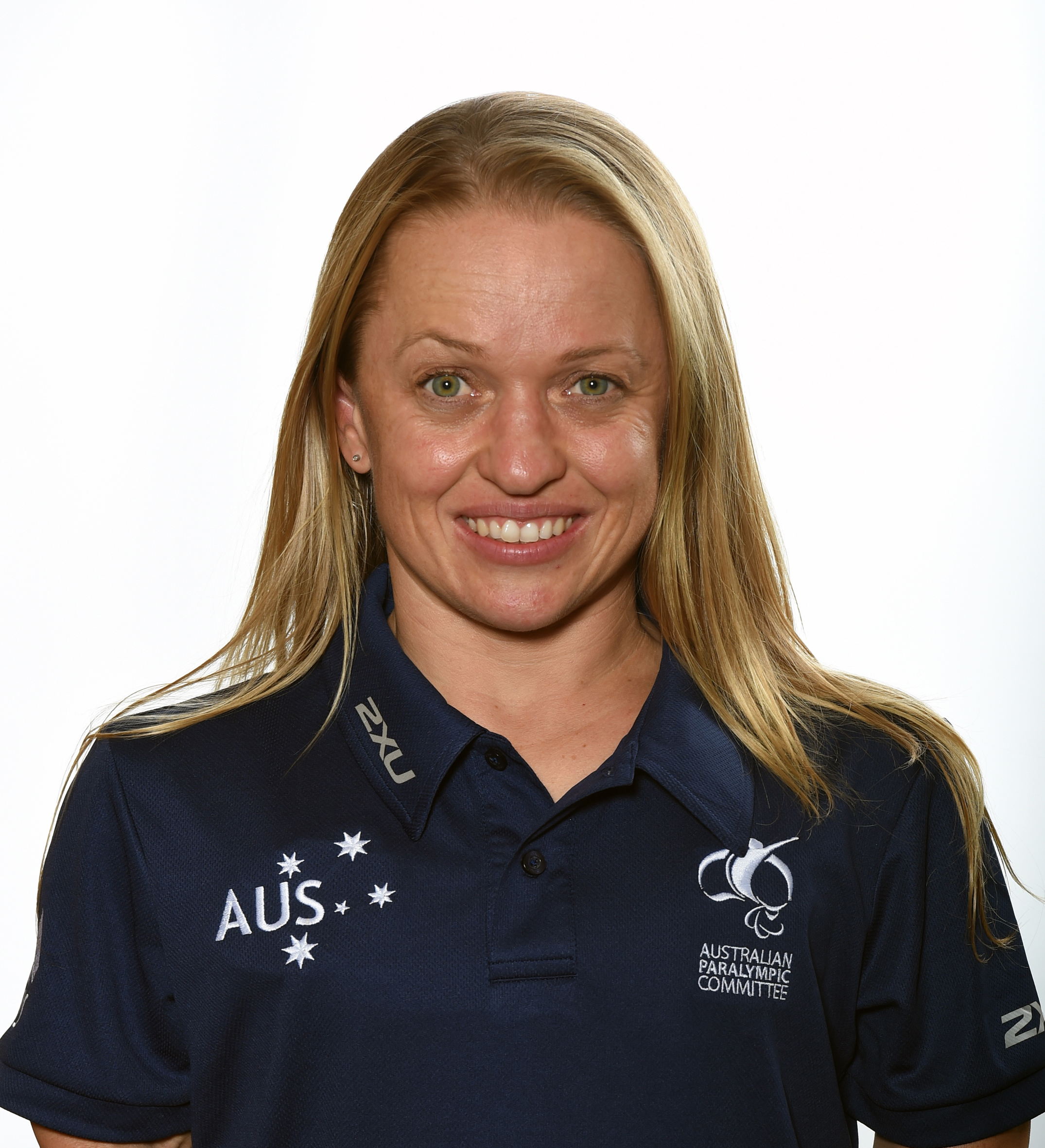
- 2016 Australian Paralympic team portrait of Huebner

Personal information
- Full name: Tanya Huebner
- Nationality: Australia

Sport
- Sport: Swimming
- Strokes: Freestyle, butterfly, medley
- Classifications: S6, SB5, SM6
Medal record
Women's paralympic swimming
Representing Australia
World Championships (LC)
Gold medal – first place	2015 Glasgow	Women's 4x100m Freestyle Relay 34pts (heats)
Silver medal – second place	2015 Glasgow	Women's 4x100m Medley Relay 34pts (heats)

Tanya Huebner is an Australian swimmer. She has represented Australia at the 2012 London and the 2016 Rio Paralympics.

== Swimming ==
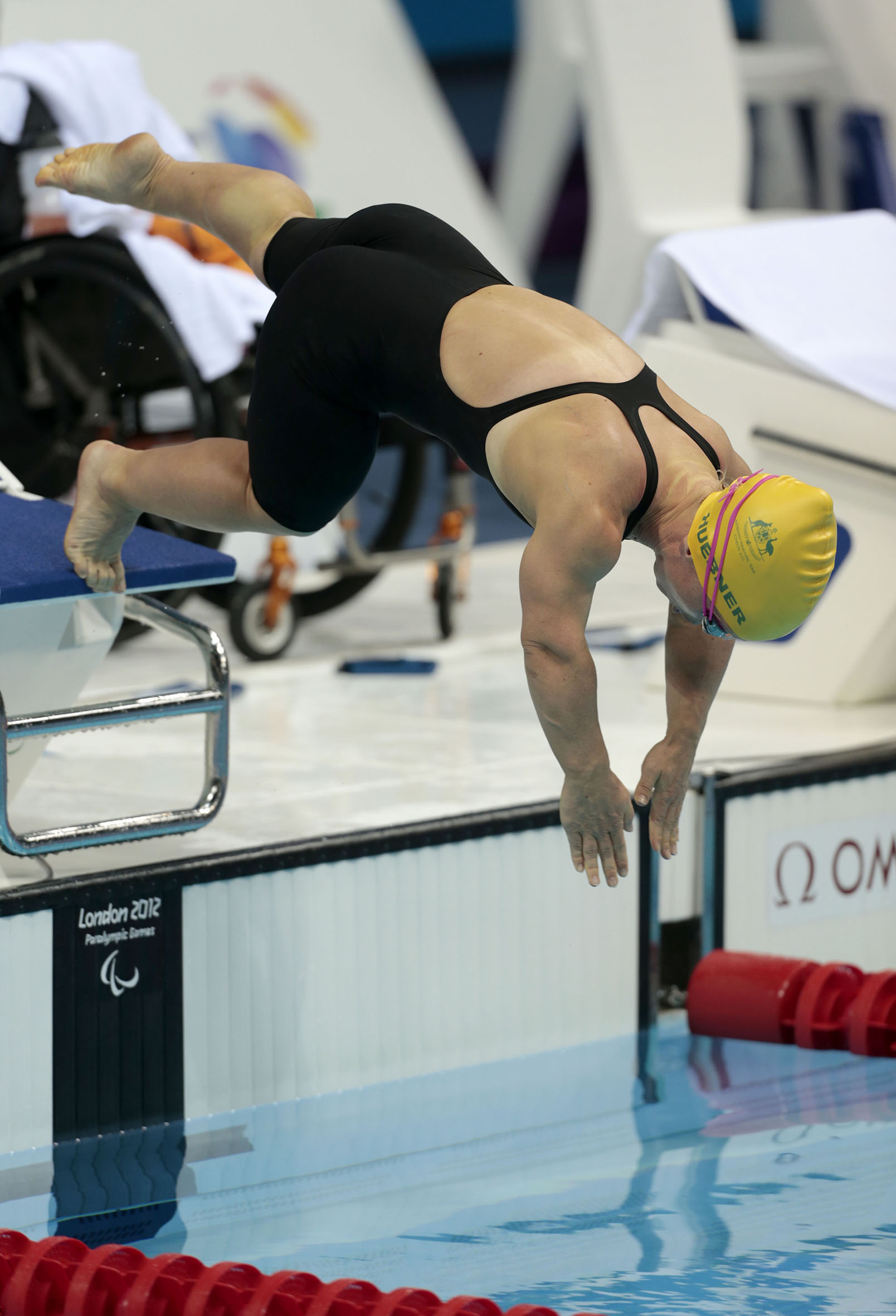
Huebner at the 2012 London Paralympics

Huebner is an S6 classified swimmer. She is a member of Melbourne Vicentre Swimming Club.

She started swimming when she was extraordinarily young. In 2008, Huebner competed in Rock2Ramp. That year, she also competed in the Club-to-Club swim from Edithvale Life Saving Club to Aspendale Life Saving Club. In 2010, she woke up at 4:30am daily in order to train. She competed in the 2010 International Paralympic Committee swimming world championships. She took up a swimming scholarship at the Australian Institute of Sport in July 2011. She swam for Bayside at the 2011 Australian Open Championships. She competed in the 2011 Pan Pacific Swimming Championships in the 200 metres individual medley SM6 event, where she finished first with a time of 3:31:36. In 2011, she also competed at the Can-Am Championships in California. She was selected to represent Australia at the 2012 Summer Paralympics in swimming in the 50m Freestyle, 100m Freestyle, 100m Breaststroke, 50m Butterfly and 200m Individual Medley events. The Games were her first.

At the 2015 IPC Swimming World Championships, Glasgow, Scotland, she won gold medal in the Women's 4 × 100 m Freestyle Relay 34pt as a heat swimmer, silver medal in the 4 × 100-metre Medley Relay 34pts as a heat swimmer, fourth in the 100-metre Breaststroke SB6, seventh in the Mixed 4 x 50-metre freestyle relay 20pts, ninth in the Women's 50m Butterfly S6 and thirteenth in the Women's 50-metre Freestyle S6.

At the 2016 Rio Paralympics, she competed and placed fifth in her heat for 50-metre butterfly S6 and didn't qualify for the finals. She was fifth in the finals of the 100-metre Breaststroke SB6, and placed sixth in the Mixed 4 x 50-metre Freestyle Relay 20 points alongside Rachael Watson, Tiffany Thomas Kane, Ahmed Kelly and Matthew Haanappel.
