= Emanuela Romano =

Italian Paralympic swimmer

Personal information
- Born: Naples, Italy
- Height: 1.60 m (5 ft 3 in)
- Weight: 48 kg (106 lb)

Sport
- Country: Italy
- Sport: Paralympic swimming
- Disability: Arthrogryposis
- Disability class: S6
- Club: ASD Nuotatori Campani, Naples
- Coached by: Vincenzo Allocco; Riccardo Vernole
Medal record
Paralympic swimming
Representing Italy
World Championships
Gold medal – first place	2013 Montreal	Women's 50m freestyle S6
Silver medal – second place	2013 Montreal	Women's 100m freestyle S6
Silver medal – second place	2013 Montreal	Women's 4x50m freestyle relay 20pts
European Championships
Bronze medal – third place	2016 Funchal	Women's 4x50m freestyle relay 20pts

Emanuela Romano is an Italian Paralympic swimmer who competes in international level events. She has won three medals at the 2013 IPC Swimming World Championships in Montreal, a bronze medalist at the 2016 IPC Swimming European Championships and has competed at the 2012 and 2016 Summer Paralympics. She also holds the Italian record for the 100m backstroke in her sports category.
