= Tiffany Thomas Kane =

Australian Paralympic swimmer (born 2001)

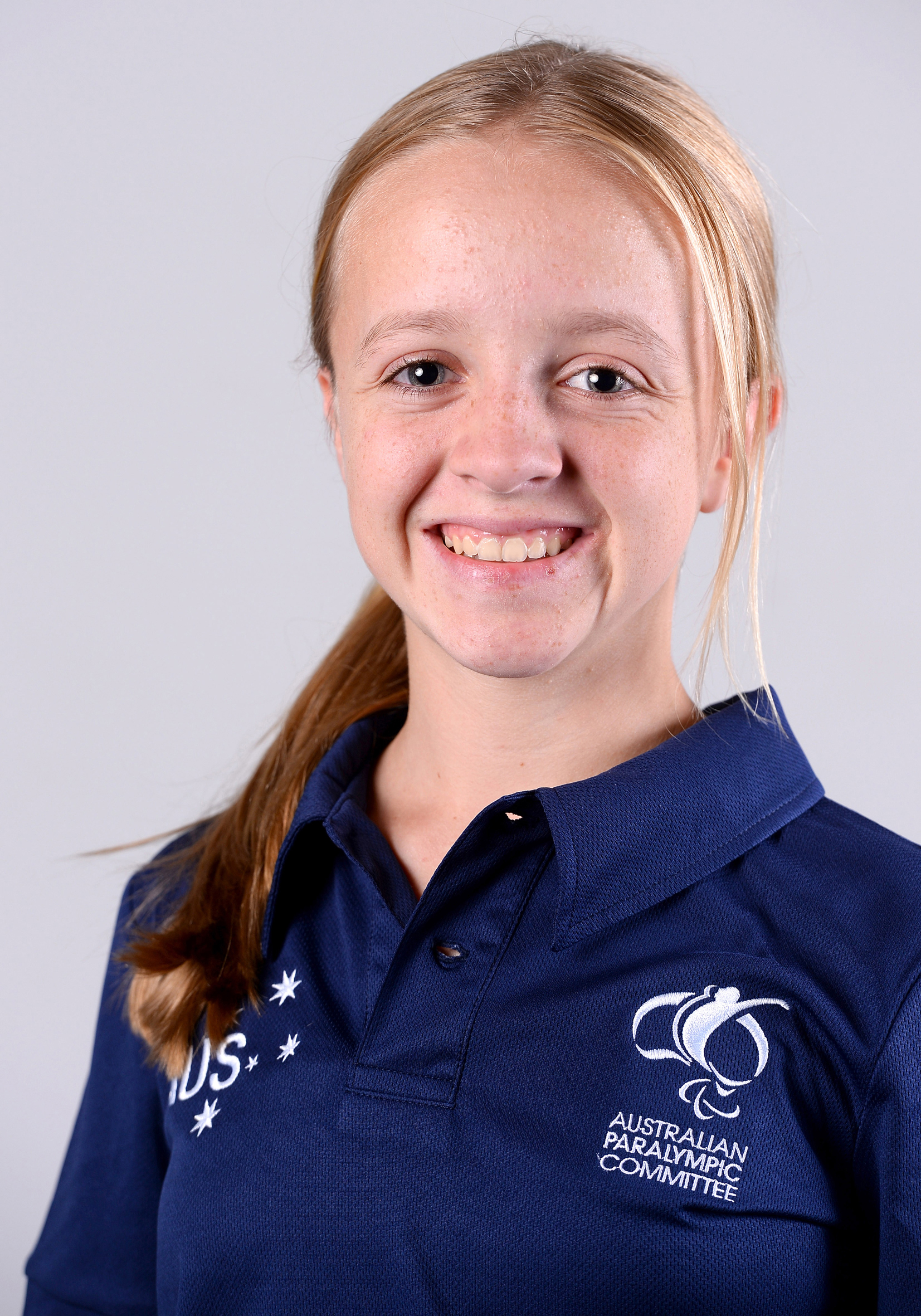
- 2016 Australian Paralympic team portrait

Personal information
- Full name: Tiffany Thomas Kane
- Nationality: Australian
- Born: 9 August 2001 (age 25)

Sport
- Sport: Swimming
- Classifications: S7, SB7, SM7
- Club: Warringah Aquatic
- Coach: Jon Bell
Medal record
Paralympic swimming
Representing Australia
Summer Paralympic Games
Gold medal – first place	2016 Rio de Janeiro	100 m breaststroke SB6
Bronze medal – third place	2016 Rio de Janeiro	50 m freestyle S6
Bronze medal – third place	2016 Rio de Janeiro	50 m butterfly S6
Bronze medal – third place	2016 Rio de Janeiro	200 m medley SM6
Bronze medal – third place	2020 Tokyo	200 m medley SM7
Bronze medal – third place	2020 Tokyo	100 m breaststroke SB7
World Para Swimming Championships
Gold medal – first place	2015 Glasgow	100 m breaststroke SB6
Gold medal – first place	2019 London	100 m breaststroke SB7
Silver medal – second place	2015 Glasgow	50 m butterfly S6
Bronze medal – third place	2015 Glasgow	50 m freestyle S6
Bronze medal – third place	2015 Glasgow	100 m freestyle S6

Tiffany Thomas Kane, OAM (born 9 August 2001) is a retired Australian Paralympic swimmer. She represented Australia at the 2016 Rio Paralympics, winning a gold and three bronze medals, and at the 2020 Tokyo Paralympics, winning a further two bronze medals.

== Personal ==
Thomas Kane was born on 9 August 2001 with hypochondroplasia, a developmental disorder causing short stature. She attended Ravenswood School for Girls in Sydney, New South Wales.

== Career ==
Thomas Kane took up swimming at the age of 3. She is an S6 swimmer. In 2015, she trains under Lach Falvey at Ravenswood Swim Club, the same club as dual world champion and Olympic silver medallist James Magnussen. She was the youngest Australian swimmer selected to compete at the 2015 IPC Swimming World Championships in Glasgow, Scotland after breaking world records at the 2015 Australian Swimming Championships. At the age of 13, at 2015 IPC Swimming Championships, she won a gold medal in the Women's 100m breaststroke SB6 in a world record time of 1:34.95, silver medal in the Women's 50 m Butterfly S6 and bronze medals in the Women's 50 m Freestyle S6 and Women's 100 m Freestyle S6. She finished fifth in the Women's 100m Backstroke S6 and seventh in the Mixed 4x50m Freestyle Relay 20pts. She was awarded Swimming Australia's 2015 AIS Discovery of the Year Award. In 2015, she is a New South Wales Institute of Sport scholarship holder.

At the 2016 Australian Swimming Championships in Adelaide, Thomas Kane set a world record of 43.06in Women's S6 in winning the Women's 50 breast multi-class event.

At the 2016 Rio Paralympics, Thomas Kane won the gold medal in the Women's 100 m Breaststroke SB6 with Paralympic record time of 1:35.39. She also won bronze medals in the Women's 50 m Freestyle, 50 m Butterfly S6 and 200 m Individual Medley SM6.

In reflection on racing at Rio, Thomas Kane says "It's taken everything away. Just to think that I'm here competing for my country, I've just not stopped trying every time. It's just been such a good time and I've enjoyed it every second." She continues to say "I wanted that gold medal in my race; I knew I had to go my best and it’s just such an amazing thing to have around me." Tiffany was officially awarded an Order of Australia medal in January 2017 for her "service to sport" following her accomplishments in Rio de Janeiro the previous year.

At the 2018 Commonwealth Games, Gold Coast, Thomas Kane finished fourth in two events – Women's S8 50m Freestyle and Women's S7 50m Butterfly.

At the 2019 World Para Swimming Championships in London, Thomas Kane won the gold medal in the Women's 100 m Breaststroke SB7 and placed fifth in four other events.

At the 2020 Tokyo Paralympics, Thomas Kane won bronze medals in the Women's 100 m Breaststroke SB7 (with a time of 1:35.02) and the Women's 200 m Individual Medley SM7 (with a time of 3:03.02). She also swam in the 50 m butterfly S7 but failed to advance to the final.

Her retirement was announced through twitter in April 2022.

== Recognition ==
- 2015 – Discovery of the Year Award from Swimming Australia
- 2017 – Medal of the Order of Australia (OAM)
- 2019 – Swimming Australia Paralympic Program Swimmer of the Year (joint winner with Lakeisha Patterson)
