= Ellie Simmonds =

British Paralympic swimmer (born 1994)

Ellie Simmonds OBE
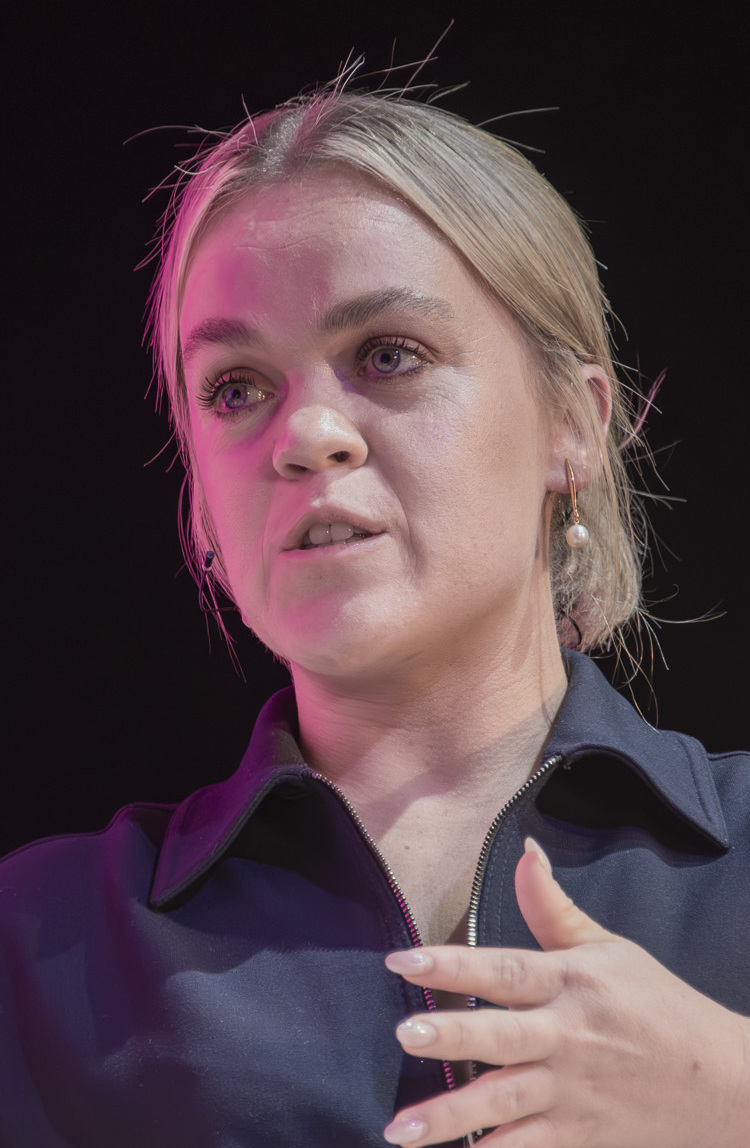
- Simmonds in 2025

Personal information
- Full name: Eleanor May Simmonds
- Nickname: Ellie
- Born: 11 November 1994 (age 31) Glossop, Derbyshire, England

Sport
- Sport: Para swimming
- Disability: Achondroplasia
- Disability class: S6, SM6, SB6
- Events: freestyle, individual medley, breaststroke
- Club: Camden Swiss Cottage Swimming Club, London
- Coached by: Steve Bayley
Medal record
Women's para swimming
Representing Great Britain
Event	1st	2nd	3rd
Paralympic Games	5	1	2
World Championships	8	3	4
World Championships (25 m)	6	1	0
European Championships	7	2	0
Paralympic Games
Gold medal – first place	2008 Beijing	100 m freestyle S6
Gold medal – first place	2008 Beijing	400 m freestyle S6
Gold medal – first place	2012 London	400 m freestyle S6
Gold medal – first place	2012 London	200 m individual medley SM6
Gold medal – first place	2016 Rio de Janeiro	200 m individual medley SM6
Silver medal – second place	2012 London	100m freestyle S6
Bronze medal – third place	2012 London	50m freestyle S6
Bronze medal – third place	2016 Rio de Janeiro	400 m freestyle S6
World Championships
Gold medal – first place	2010 Eindhoven	100 m freestyle S6
Gold medal – first place	2010 Eindhoven	200 m individual medley SM6
Gold medal – first place	2010 Eindhoven	50 m freestyle S6
Gold medal – first place	2010 Eindhoven	400 m freestyle S6
Gold medal – first place	2013 Montreal	100 m freestyle S6
Gold medal – first place	2013 Montreal	400 m freestyle S6
Gold medal – first place	2013 Montreal	200 m medley SM6
Gold medal – first place	2015 Glasgow	200 m medley SM6
Silver medal – second place	2010 Eindhoven	4x100 m freestyle relay 34pts
Silver medal – second place	2010 Eindhoven	4x100 m medley relay 34pts
Silver medal – second place	2015 Glasgow	400 m freestyle S6
Bronze medal – third place	2010 Eindhoven	4x50 m medley relay 20pts
Bronze medal – third place	2013 Montreal	50 m freestyle S6
Bronze medal – third place	2015 Glasgow	100 m breaststroke SB6
Bronze medal – third place	2015 Glasgow	4x100 m Freestyle Relay 34pts
World Championships (25m)
Gold medal – first place	2009 Rio de Janeiro	100 m freestyle S6
Gold medal – first place	2009 Rio de Janeiro	400 m freestyle S6
Gold medal – first place	2009 Rio de Janeiro	200 m individual medley SM6
Gold medal – first place	2009 Rio de Janeiro	4x100 m medley S6
Gold medal – first place	2009 Rio de Janeiro	4x100 m freestyle S6
Gold medal – first place	2009 Rio de Janeiro	50 m freestyle S6
Silver medal – second place	2009 Rio de Janeiro	200 m individual medley SM6
European Championships
Gold medal – first place	2009 Reykjavik	50 m freestyle S6
Gold medal – first place	2009 Reykjavik	100 m freestyle S6
Gold medal – first place	2009 Reykjavik	400 m freestyle – S6
Gold medal – first place	2009 Reykjavik	200 m individual medley SM6
Gold medal – first place	2009 Reykjavik	4x100 m freestyle S6
Gold medal – first place	2014 Eindhoven	400m freestyle S6
Gold medal – first place	2014 Eindhoven	100m breaststroke S6
Silver medal – second place	2014 Eindhoven	50m freestyle S6
Silver medal – second place	2014 Eindhoven	100m freestyle S6
Paralympic World Cup
Gold medal – first place	2010 Manchester	200 m individual medley SM6

Eleanor May Simmonds (born 11 November 1994) is a British retired Paralympian swimmer who competed in S6 events. She came to national attention when she competed in the 2008 Summer Paralympics in Beijing, winning two gold medals for Great Britain. She was the youngest member of the team, at the age of 13.

In 2012, Simmonds was again selected for the Great Britain squad, this time swimming at a home games in London. She won another two golds in London, including setting a World Record in the 400m freestyle, and a further gold medal at the Rio Paralympics in 2016, this time setting a world record for the 200m medley.

== Early and personal life ==
Simmonds was born in Glossop, Derbyshire, and is an adoptee. She grew up in Aldridge, a part of the Metropolitan Borough of Walsall, and completed her primary education at Cooper and Jordan CofE Primary before attending Aldridge School and later Olchfa School in Swansea.

Simmonds, who has achondroplasia, became interested in swimming at the age of five. She swam for Boldmere Swimming Club in Sutton Coldfield, under Head Coach Ashley Cox, but she and her mother moved to Swansea when Simmonds was 11 to take advantage of the city's world-class swimming pool. Simmonds has three sisters and a brother.

She studied Psychology at Loughborough University in England. She was in a relationship with Matt Dean until 2023.

== Career ==
At the age of 13, Simmonds was the youngest British athlete at the 2008 Summer Paralympics in Beijing, competing in the 50m, 100m and 400m freestyle, 50m butterfly, and 200m Individual Medley. She won gold medals in the 100m and 400m freestyle events.

On 1 September 2012, Simmonds repeated her gold performance to win the 400m freestyle at the 2012 Summer Paralympics in London, in which she took five seconds off the World Record time. Two days later, on the evening of 3 September, she took Gold in the 200m Individual Medley, breaking the World Record that she had set in the qualifying round that morning.

On 12 September 2016, at the Rio Paralympics, Simmonds defended her gold medal for the 200m individual medley setting a new world record, the first below 3 minutes at 2:59.81 Simmonds also won a bronze medal in the 400m freestyle at the 2016 Summer Paralympics.

In addition, Simmonds has won ten gold World Championship titles, and swims in the S6 disability category.

On 2 September 2021, Simmonds announced her Paralympic retirement after missing out on a medal in the Tokyo 2020 Paralympics.

After retiring from competitive swimming, Simmonds has gone on to present for BBC Sport, including for the Birmingham 2022 Commonwealth Games and the 2024 Paralympics.

Since 2023, Simmonds has been one of several British Olympians and Paralympians to feature in adverts for British Gas.

In August 2024, Simmonds was a guest on the How to Fail podcast, hosted by Elizabeth Day.

== Television career ==
On 7 August 2022, it was announced that Simmonds would be participating in the twentieth series of the BBC One show Strictly Come Dancing with her professional dance partner being Nikita Kuzmin. She was eliminated in Week 7 after losing the dance off to Molly Rainford and Carlos Gu.

Also, Simmonds competed on TV show The Great Celebrity Bake-Off (series 2, episode 2) and has appeared on a number of other television programmes including Saturday Night Takeaway, Ellie Simmonds: Swimming with Dolphins, Would I Lie to You? and The Crystal Maze.

Her documentaries include A World without Dwarfism (2022), Finding My Secret Family (2023), and Should I Have Children? (2025).

Simmonds' 2023 documentary Ellie Simmonds: Finding My Secret Family won Best Single Documentary at the 2024 British Academy Television Awards.

In August 2024, Simmonds won the fourth series of Cooking with the Stars.

== Honours and awards ==
Simmonds won the 2008 BBC Young Sports Personality of the Year award.

Simmonds was appointed Member of the Order of the British Empire (MBE) in the 2009 New Year Honours. At 14 years old, she became the youngest person ever to have received this honour. She received the honour from Queen Elizabeth II on 18 February 2009. In March 2012, in the 200 m individual medley, she became the first swimmer to break a world record at London's Aquatics Centre. Her victory in a time of 3:08.14 broke her own previous best time by over half a second.

In 2011, Simmonds won the award for "Best British Sporting Performance for an Athlete with Disability" at the Jaguar Academy of Sport Annual Awards. At the 2012 Summer Paralympics in London Simmonds won four medals, two golds, a silver and a bronze. She took gold in the S6 400m with a new world record; gold in the S6 200m again with a new world record; silver in the S6 100m and a bronze in the S6 50m. In celebration of her two gold medals, two Royal Mail postboxes were painted gold in her honour, one in Aldridge and one in Swansea.

Simmonds was elevated to Officer of the Order of the British Empire (OBE) in the 2013 New Year Honours for services to Paralympic sport.

=== Sport ===
Simmonds is a patron of the Dwarf Sports Association UK, along with swimmer Matthew Whorwood. Simmonds said of the charity, "It's a charity that supports people of short stature and helps them get into sport. One of the highlights of the year is the convention we have in the spring. There's everything from power lifting to athletics."

In January 2019, Simmonds was appointed to the Birmingham 2022 Commonwealth Games Organising Committee board.

=== Young people ===
Simmonds is an ambassador for The Scout Association.

She is also a Girlguiding leader in Manchester, where her pack name is Aqua Owl.

Simmonds is an ambassador for The King's Trust.

=== Water ===
Simmonds is a WaterAid ambassador.

== See also ==
- Swimming at the 2008 Summer Paralympics
- Swimming at the 2012 Summer Paralympics
- Swimming at the 2016 Summer Paralympics
- 2012 Olympics gold post boxes in the United Kingdom

Awards and achievements
Preceded by Tom Daley	BBC Young Sports Personality of the Year; 2008	Succeeded by Tom Daley
