= Vianney Trejo Delgadillo =

Mexican Paralympic swimmer

Vianney Marlen Trejo Delgadillo
Personal information
- Nickname: Golden Siren
- Born: 2 August 1994 (age 31) Mexico City, Mexico
- Education: Anahuac University
- Height: 1.50 m (4 ft 11 in)

Sport
- Country: Mexico
- Sport: Paralympic swimming
- Disability class: S6, SB5, SM6
- Club: Mexican National Paralympic Training Centre
- Coached by: Jose Pelaez Ampudia
Medal record
Paralympic swimming
Representing Mexico
World Championships
Gold medal – first place	2017 Mexico City	100m freestyle S6
Silver medal – second place	2013 Montreal	400m freestyle S6
Silver medal – second place	2017 Mexico City	100m backstroke S6
Silver medal – second place	2017 Mexico City	400m freestyle S6
Bronze medal – third place	2010 Eindhoven	4x50m freestyle relay
Bronze medal – third place	2015 Glasgow	400m freestyle S6
Bronze medal – third place	2017 Mexico City	50m freestyle S6
Bronze medal – third place	2017 Mexico City	4x50m freestyle relay
Parapan American Games
Gold medal – first place	2011 Guadalajara	400m freestyle S6
Gold medal – first place	2011 Guadalajara	100m backstroke S6
Gold medal – first place	2011 Guadalajara	50m butterfly S6
Gold medal – first place	2011 Guadalajara	200m individual medley SM6
Gold medal – first place	2015 Toronto	100m backstroke S6
Gold medal – first place	2019 Lima	400m freestyle S6
Gold medal – first place	2019 Lima	4x100m freestyle relay
Silver medal – second place	2011 Guadalajara	50m freestyle S6
Silver medal – second place	2011 Guadalajara	100m freestyle S6
Silver medal – second place	2015 Toronto	400m freestyle S6
Silver medal – second place	2019 Lima	100m backstroke S6
Silver medal – second place	2019 Lima	200m individual medley SM6
Silver medal – second place	2023 Santiago	100m backstroke S6
Bronze medal – third place	2015 Toronto	100m freestyle S6
Bronze medal – third place	2015 Toronto	200m individual medley SM6
Bronze medal – third place	2023 Santiago	400m freestyle S6
Bronze medal – third place	2023 Santiago	100m breaststroke SB5

Vianney Marlen Trejo Delgadillo (born 2 August 1994) is a Mexican Paralympic swimmer who competes in international level events.

== Personal life ==
She was born with a right arm malformation and underdeveloped legs.
