= S6 (classification) =

Para-swimming classification

S6, SB5, SM6 are Para swimming classifications used for categorising swimmers based on their level of disability. This class includes people with a number of different types of disability including short stature, major limb impairment or loss in two limbs. This includes people with cerebral palsy, people with dwarfism and amputees. The class competes at the Paralympic Games.

== Definition ==
This classification is for swimming. In the classification title, S represents Freestyle, Backstroke and Butterfly strokes. SB means breaststroke. SM means individual medley. Swimming classifications are on a gradient, with one being the most severely physically impaired to ten having the least amount of physical disability. Jane Buckley, writing for the Sporting Wheelies, describes the swimmers in this classification as having: "full use of their arms and hands, some trunk control but no useful leg muscles; Swimmers with coordination problems (usually these athletes walk); Swimmers with major limb loss of 2 limbs; Little People / Dwarfs (O 130cm females & O 137cm males)." The class "...includes swimmers with short stature, amputations of both arms or moderate coordination problems on one side of their body."

== Disability groups ==
This class includes people with several disability types including cerebral palsy, short stature and amputations.

=== Amputee ===
ISOD amputee A1 and A5 swimmers may be found in this class. Prior to the 1990s, A1 and A5 were often grouped with other amputee classes in swimming competitions, including the Paralympic Games.

==== Upper body amputations ====
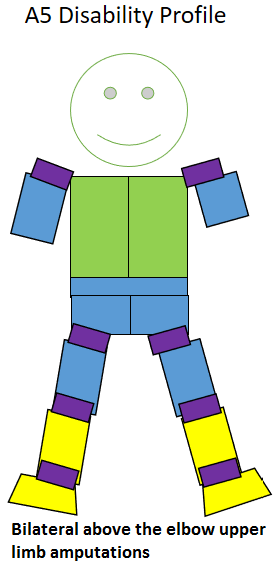
Type of amputation for an A5 classified sportsperson.

ISOD amputee A5 swimmers may be found in this class. Because their legs are their greatest strength, they modify their entry into the water to take advantage of this. Compared to able bodied swimmers, swimmers in this class have a shorter stroke length and increased stroke rate.

The nature of a person's amputations in this class can affect their physiology and sports performance. Because they are missing a limb, amputees are more prone to overuse injuries in their remaining limbs. Common problems for intact upper limbs for people in this class include rotator cuffs tearing, shoulder impingement, epicondylitis and peripheral nerve entrapment.

A study was done comparing the performance of swimming competitors at the 1984 Summer Paralympics. It found there was no significant difference in performance in times between women in A4, A5 and A6 the 100 meter 100 meter freestyle, men in A4 and A5 in the 100 meter freestyle, men in A5 and A6 in the 100 meter freestyle, women in A5 and A6 in the 50 meter butterfly, women in A4, A5 and A6 in the 4 x 50 meter individual medley, men in A5 and A6 in the 4 x 50 meter individual medley, and men and women in A4, A5 and A6 in the 100 meter backstroke.

==== Lower body amputations ====
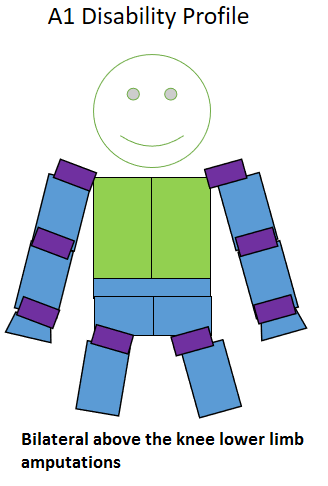
Type of amputation for an A1 classified sportsperson.

A1 swimmers including S4, S5 and S6. Swimmers in this class have a similar stroke length and stroke rate to able bodied swimmers. Lower limb amputations effect a person's energy cost for being mobile. To keep their oxygen consumption rate similar to people without lower limb amputations, they need to walk slower. People in this class use around 120% more oxygen to walk or run the same distance as someone without a lower limb amputation.

Because of the potential for balance issues related to having an amputation, during weight training, amputees are encouraged to use a spotter when lifting more than 15 pounds (6.8 kg).

=== Cerebral palsy ===
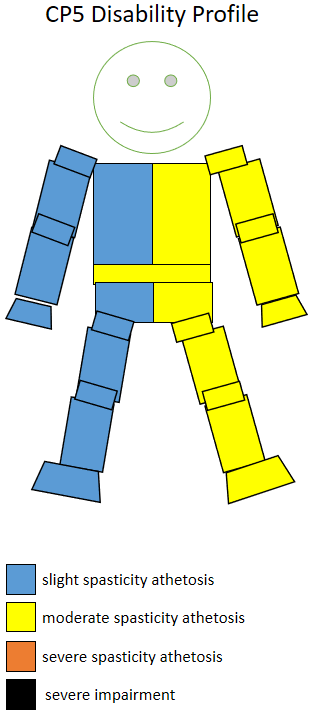
The spasticity athetosis level and location of a CP5 sportsperson.

One of the disability groups in this classification is swimmers with cerebral palsy, including CP5 classified swimmers. CP5 sportspeople in this class have greater functional control of their upper body. They may require the use of an assistive device when walking but they do not require use of a wheelchair. They often have problems with their dynamic equilibrium but not their static equilibrium. Quick movements can upset their balance.

Because of their balance issues, swimmers in this class can find the starting block problematic and often have slower times entering the water than other competitors in their class. Because the disability of swimmers in this class involves in a loss of function in specific parts of their body, they are more prone to injury than their able-bodied counterparts as a result of overcompensation in other parts of their body.

When fatigued, CP5 asymmetry in their stroke becomes a problem for swimmers in this class, more so than others in their class. The integrated classification system used for swimming, where swimmers with CP compete against those with other disabilities, is subject to criticisms has been that the nature of CP is that greater exertion leads to decreased dexterity and fine motor movements. This puts competitors with CP at a disadvantage when competing against people with amputations who do not lose coordination as a result of exertion.

CP5 swimmers tend to have a passive normalized drag in the range of 0.6 to 1.0. This puts them into the passive drag band of PDB5, PDB6, PDB7, PDB8, and PDB9.

=== Short stature ===
==== SS1 ====
S6 swimmers with short stature have Achondroplasia and men are no taller than 137 cm while women are not taller than 130 cm. They can maintain the correct catch phase when swimming. They also are capable of doing a full arm cycle while swimming. They normally start from the starting platform and can execute a standard turn in the water.

==== SS2 ====
SS2 swimmers may be found S6. Men in this class are 145 centimetres (57 in) tall or less, with an arm length equal to or less than 66 centimetres (26 in). When their standing height and arm length are added together, the distance is equal to or less than 200 centimetres (79 in). For women in this class, the same measurements are 137 centimetres (54 in), 63 centimetres (25 in) and 190 centimetres (75 in).

There are generally two types of syndromes that cause short stature. One is disproportionate limb size on a normal size torso. The second is proportionate, where they are generally small for their average age. There are a variety of causes including skeletal dysplasia, chondrodysrophy, and growth hormone deficiencies. Short stature can cause a number of other disabilities including eye problems, joint defects, joint dislocation or limited range of movement.

=== Spinal cord injuries ===
People with spinal cord injuries compete in this class, including F5 sportspeople.

==== F5 ====
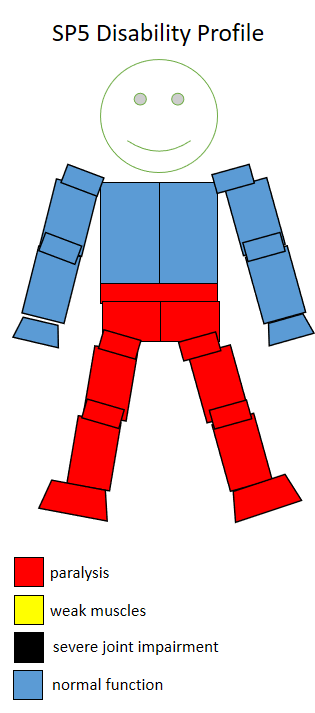
Functional profile of a wheelchair sportsperson in the F5 class.

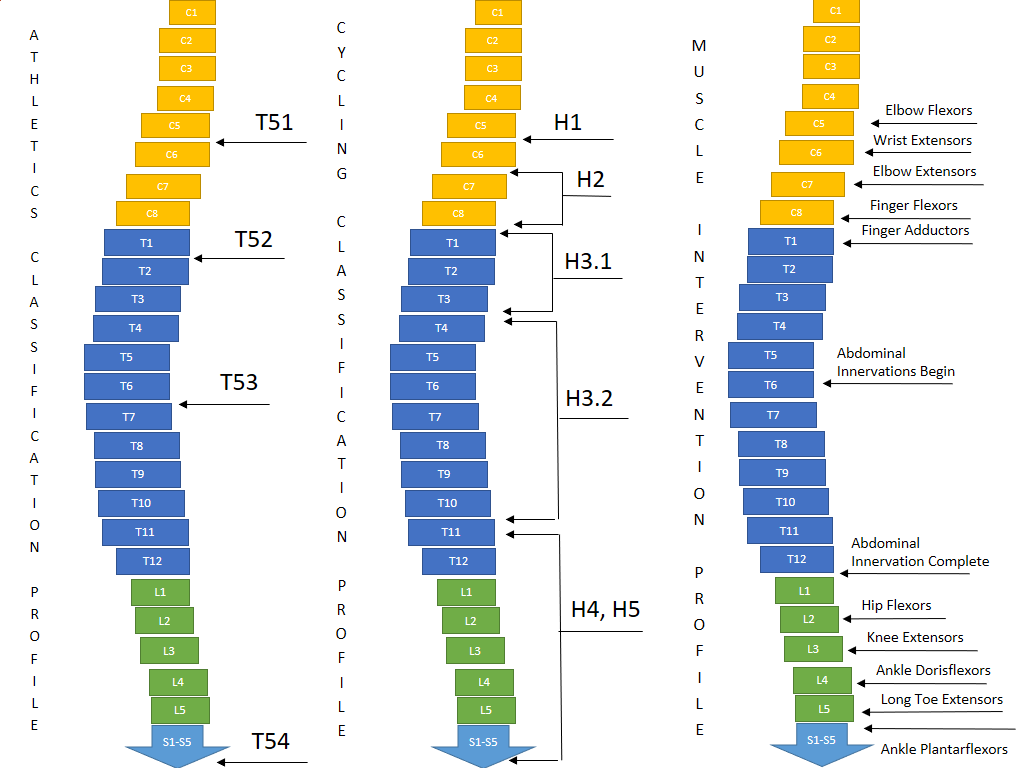
Comparing key muscle innervations for spinal cord levels compared to cycling and athletics classifications.

This is wheelchair sport classification that corresponds to the neurological level T8 - L1. In the past, this class was known as Lower 3, or Upper 4. Disabled Sports USA defined the anatomical definition of this class in 2003 as, "Normal upper limb function. Have abdominal muscles and spinal extensors (upper or more commonly upper and lower). May have non-functional hip flexors (grade 1). Have no abductor function."

People in this class have good sitting balance. People with lesions located between T9 and T12 have some loss of abdominal muscle control. Disabled Sports USA defined the functional definition of this class in 2003 as, "Three trunk movements may be seen in this class: 1) Off the back of a chair (in an upwards direction). 2) Movement in the backwards and forwards plane. 3) Some trunk rotation. They have fair to good sitting balance. They cannot have functional hip flexors, i.e. ability to lift the thigh upwards in the sitting position. They may have stiffness of the spine that improves balance but reduces the ability to rotate the spine."

Swimming classification is done based on a total points system, with a variety of functional and medical tests being used as part of a formula to assign a class. Part of this test involves the Adapted Medical Research Council (MRC) scale. For upper trunk extension, T6 - T10 are given 3 - 5 points.

S6 swimmers with spinal cord injuries tend to be complete paraplegics with lesions below T9 to L1 and where their leg function does not assist them in swimming. S6 swimmers of this type have effect arm cycling and can use their hands and fingers to gain propulsion during the catch phase. Their hips may ride slightly lower in the water, but their legs are not in a V position. They may start either in the water or from a sitting dive position. They turn using their hands.

A study of was done comparing the performance of athletics competitors at the 1984 Summer Paralympics. It found there was little significant difference in performance times between women in 2 (SP4) and 3 (SP4, SP5) in the 50m breaststroke. It found there was little significant difference in performance times between men in 2 (SP4) and 3 (SP4, SP5) in the 50m breaststroke. It found there was little significant difference in performance times between women in 2 (SP4) and 3 (SP4, SP5) in the 50m freestyle. It found there was little significant difference in performance times between men in 2 (SP4) and 3 (SP4, SP5) in the 50m freestyle. It found there was little significant difference in performance times between men in 2 (SP4) and 3 (SP4, SP5) in the 50m backstroke. It found there was little significant difference in performance times between women in 4 (SP5, SP6), 5 (SP6, SP7) and 6 (SP7) in the 100m breaststroke. It found there was little significant difference in performance times between women in 4 (SP5, SP6), 5 (SP6, SP7) and 6 (SP7) in the 100m backstroke. It found there was little significant difference in performance times between women in 4 (SP5, SP6), 5 (SP6, SP7) and 6 (SP7) in the 100m freestyle. It found there was little significant difference in performance times between women in 4 (SP5, SP6), 5 (SP6, SP7) and 6 (SP7) in the 14 x 50 m individual medley. It found there was little significant difference in performance times between men in 4 (SP5, SP6), 5 (SP6, SP7) and 6 (SP7) in the 100m backstroke. It found there was little significant difference in performance times between men in 4 (SP5, SP6), 5 (SP6, SP7) and 6 (SP7) in the 100m breaststroke. It found there was little significant difference in performance times between women in 2 (SP4), 3 (SP4, SP5) and 4 (SP5, SP6) in the 25 m butterfly. It found there was little significant difference in performance times between men in 2 (SP4), 3 (SP4, SP5) and 4 (SP5, SP6) in the 25 m butterfly.

== History ==
The classification was created by the International Paralympic Committee. In 2003 the committee approved a plan which recommended the development of a universal classification code. The code was approved in 2007, and defines the "objective of classification as developing and implementing accurate, reliable and consistent sport focused classification systems", which are known as "evidence based, sport specific classification". In November 2015, they approved the revised classification code, which "aims to further develop evidence based, sport specific classification in all sports".

== Events ==
Events that are open to a swimmer from this class include 50m and 100m Freestyle, 200m Freestyle, 400m Freestyle, 100m Backstroke, 50m Butterfly, 100m Breaststroke and 200m Individual Medley events.

== At the Paralympic Games ==
For this classification, organisers of the Paralympic Games have the option of including the following events on the Paralympic programme: 50m and 100m Freestyle, 200m Freestyle, 400m Freestyle, 100m Backstroke, 50m Butterfly, 100m Breaststroke and 200m Individual Medley events.

For the 2016 Summer Paralympics in Rio, the International Paralympic Committee had a zero classification at the Games policy. This policy was put into place in 2014, with the goal of avoiding last minute changes in classes that would negatively impact athlete training preparations. All competitors needed to be internationally classified with their classification status confirmed prior to the Games, with exceptions to this policy being dealt with on a case-by-case basis.

== Records ==
In the S6 50 m Freestyle Long Course, the men's world record is held by China's Xu Qing with a time of 00:29.78 and the women's world record is held by the Netherlands' Mirjam de Koning-Peper with a time of 00:34.94. In the S6 100 m Freestyle Long Course, the men's world record is held by Sweden's Anders Olsson and the women's world record is held by Great Britain's Eleanor Simmonds.

=== Paralympic records ===
The table below records the fastest ever Paralympic record in this class for specific events.

Event	Class	Time		Name	Nation	Date	Games	Ref
50 m freestyle	S6	29.78	WR	Qing Xu	China	15 September 2008	2008 Beijing	
100 m freestyle	S6	1:05.95	WR	Anders Olsson	Sweden	8 September 2008	2008 Beijing	
400 m freestyle	S6	4:48.31		Anders Olsson	Sweden	14 September 2008	2008 Beijing	
50 m butterfly	S6	30.79	WR	Qing Xu	China	13 September 2008	2008 Beijing	

Legend: # – Record awaiting ratification by IPC; WR – World record;
Records not set in finals: h – heat; r – relay 1st leg; rh – relay heat 1st leg; so – swim-off

== Getting classified ==
Swimming classification generally has three components. The first is a bench press. The second is water test. The third is in competition observation. As part of the water test, swimmers are often required to demonstrate their swimming technique for all four strokes. They usually swim a distance of 25 meters for each stroke. They are also generally required to demonstrate how they enter the water and how they turn in the pool.

Classification generally has four phase. The first stage of classification is a health examination. For amputees in this class, this is often done on site at a sports training facility or competition. The second stage is observation in practice, the third stage is observation in competition and the last stage is assigning the sportsperson to a relevant class. Sometimes the health examination may not be done on site for amputees in this class because the nature of the amputation could cause not physically visible alterations to the body.

In Australia, to be classified in this category, athletes contact the Australian Paralympic Committee or their state swimming governing body. In the United States, classification is handled by the United States Paralympic Committee on a national level. The classification test has three components: "a bench test, a water test, observation during competition." American swimmers are assessed by four people: a medical classified, two general classified and a technical classifier.

== Competitors ==
Swimmers who have competed in this classification include Briton Liz Johnson, other nationals including Olena Akopyan and Anastasia Diodorova and Maria Goetze who all won medals in their class at the 2008 Paralympics. American swimmers who have been classified by the United States Paralympic Committee as being in this class include Arden Adams, Anna Amend, Victoria Arlen and Abby Abby.
