= China at the 2016 Summer Paralympics =

- IPC code: CHN
- NPC: China Administration of Sports for Persons with Disabilities
- Website: www.caspd.org.cn

in Rio de Janeiro
- Competitors: 327 in 17 sports
- Flag bearer: Rong Jing
- Medals Ranked 1st: Gold 107 Silver 81 Bronze 51 Total 239

Summer Paralympics appearances (overview)
- 1984; 1988; 1992; 1996; 2000; 2004; 2008; 2012; 2016; 2020; 2024

China has qualified to send athletes to the 2016 Summer Paralympics in Rio de Janeiro, Brazil, from 7 September to 18 September 2016. Sports China competed in include blind football, archery, boccia, cycling, goalball, judo, paracanoeing, sitting volleyball and wheelchair basketball.

== Disability classifications ==
Every participant at the Paralympics has their disability grouped into one of five disability categories; amputation, the condition may be congenital or sustained through injury or illness; cerebral palsy; wheelchair athletes, there is often overlap between this and other categories; visual impairment, including blindness; Les autres, any physical disability that does not fall strictly under one of the other categories, for example dwarfism or multiple sclerosis. Each Paralympic sport then has its own classifications, dependent upon the specific physical demands of competition. Events are given a code, made of numbers and letters, describing the type of event and classification of the athletes competing. Some sports, such as athletics, divide athletes by both the category and severity of their disabilities, other sports, for example swimming, group competitors from different categories together, the only separation being based on the severity of the disability.

== Medalists ==
The following Chinese competitors won medals at the Games.

Medal	Athlete	Sport	Event	Date
Gold	Dong Chao	Shooting	Men's 10 metre air rifle standing SH1	September 8
Gold	Li Liqing	Judo	Women's -48kg	September 8
Gold	Zheng Tao	Swimming	Men's 100m Backstroke S6	September 8
Gold	Song Lingling	Swimming	Women's 100m Backstroke S6	September 8
Gold	Huang Lisha	Athletics	Women's 100m T53	September 8
Gold	Zhang Li	Swimming	Women's 200m Freestyle S5	September 8
Gold	Ke Liting	Swimming	Women's 100m Backstroke S7	September 8
Gold	Hu Dandan	Powerlifting	Women's -45kg	September 9
Gold	Yang Chao	Shooting	Men's 10 metre air pistol standing SH1	September 9
Gold	Zou Liankang	Swimming	Men's 100m Backstroke S2	September 9
Gold	Li Zhangyu	Cycling	Men's C1 3000m Individual Pursuit	September 9
Gold	Pan Shiyun	Swimming	Men's 50m Freestyle S7	September 9
Gold	Xu Qing	Swimming	Men's 50m Butterfly S6	September 9
Gold	Liang Guihua	Cycling	Men's C2 3000m Individual Pursuit	September 9
Gold	Zhang Liangmin	Athletics	Women's Discus Throw F11	September 9
Gold	Liu Wenjun	Athletics	Women's 100m T54	September 9
Gold	Sun Qichao	Athletics	Men's 400m T12	September 9
Gold	Zou Lijuan	Athletics	Women's Javelin Throw F34	September 9
Gold	Song Maodang	Swimming	Men's 100m Butterfly S8	September 9
Gold	China: Peng Qiuping; Jiang Shengnan; Huang Wenpan; Xu Qing; Li Hanhua*; Zhang Li*; Zou Liankang*; Chen Yi*	Swimming	Mixed 4x50metre freestyle relay-20 Points	September 9
Gold	Yang Liwan	Athletics	Women's Shot Put F54	September 10
Gold	Yuan Yanping	Judo	Women's +70kg	September 10
Gold	Xu Qing	Swimming	Men's 100m Freestyle S6	September 10
Gold	Li Zhangyu	Cycling	Men's C1-2-3 1000m Time Trial	September 10
Gold	Xu Xihan	Swimming	Women's 100m Butterfly S5	September 10
Gold	Peng Qiuping	Swimming	Women's 100m Backstroke S3	September 10
Gold	Yao Juan	Athletics	Women's Discus Throw F44	September 11
Gold	Huang Xing	Shooting	Mixed 25 metre pistol standing SH1	September 11
Gold	Liu Lei	Powerlifting	Men's -72kg	September 11
Gold	Tan Yujiao	Powerlifting	Women's -67kg	September 11
Gold	Zhou Hongzhuan	Athletics	Women's 400m T53	September 11
Gold	Lin Ping	Swimming	Women's 200m Medley SM9	September 11
Gold	Feng Panfeng	Table Tennis	Men's Singles C3	September 11
Gold	China: Wu Chunyan; Zhao Lixue; Yu He*; Shi Xucheng*; Lin Dandan*; Ye Jinyan*	Archery	Mixed Team Recurve Open	September 11
Gold	Wang Yinan	Swimming	Men's 100m Freestyle S8	September 11
Gold	Chen Junfei	Athletics	Women's Long Jump T38	September 11
Gold	Liu Jing	Table Tennis	Women's Singles C1-2	September 11
Gold	Li Junsheng	Swimming	Men's 100m Breaststroke SB4	September 11
Gold	Liu Benying	Swimming	Men's 200m Freestyle S2	September 11
Gold	Cao Ningning	Table Tennis	Men's Singles C5	September 12
Gold	Mao Jingdian	Table Tennis	Women's Singles C8	September 12
Gold	China: Ai Xinliang; Zhou Jiamin; Cao Hanwen*; Lin Yueshan*	Archery	Mixed Team Compound Open	September 12
Gold	Xue Juan	Table Tennis	Women's Singles C3	September 12
Gold	Cheng Jiao	Swimming	Women's 150m Individual Medlay SM4	September 12
Gold	Li Guizhi	Swimming	Women's 50m Freestyle S11	September 12
Gold	Fu Xinhan	Athletics	Men's Shot Put F35	September 12
Gold	Zhang Bian	Table Tennis	Women's Singles C5	September 12
Gold	Ge Yang	Table Tennis	Men's Singles C10	September 12
Gold	Pan Shiyun	Swimming	Men's 50m Butterfly S7	September 12
Gold	Zhang Li	Swimming	Women's 50m Freestyle S5	September 12
Gold	Hu Jianwen	Athletics	Men's 100m T38	September 13
Gold	Shi Yiting	Athletics	Women's 200m T36	September 13
Gold	Zhao Shuai	Table Tennis	Men's Singles C8	September 13
Gold	Shang Guangxu	Athletics	Men's Long Jump T37	September 13
Gold	Zhang Cuiping	Shooting	Women's 50 metre rifle 3 positions SH1	September 13
Gold	Zhou Jingjing	Wheelchair Fencing	Women's Individual épée B	September 13
Gold	Zou Xufeng	Wheelchair Fencing	Women's Individual épée A	September 13
Gold	Liu Meng	Table Tennis	Women's Singles C9	September 13
Gold	Sun Gang	Wheelchair Fencing	Men's Individual épée A	September 13
Gold	Yang Bozun	Swimming	Men's 100m Breaststroke SB11	September 13
Gold	Zhang Xiaotong	Swimming	Women's 100m Breaststroke SB11	September 13
Gold	Zhou Cong	Swimming	Men's 100m Backstroke S8	September 13
Gold	Huang Wenpan	Swimming	Men's 50m Freestyle S8	September 13
Gold	Zhou Xia	Athletics	Women's 100m T35	September 14
Gold	Wen Xiaoyan	Athletics	Women's Long Jump T37	September 14
Gold	Zhang Cuiping	Shooting	Mixed 50 metre rifle prone SH1	September 14
Gold	Feng Yanke	Wheelchair Fencing	Men's Individual Foil B	September 14
Gold	Rong Jing	Wheelchair Fencing	Women's Individual Foil A	September 14
Gold	Ye Ruyi	Wheelchair Fencing	Men's Individual Foil A	September 14
Gold	Li Lu	Athletics	Women's 400m T47	September 14
Gold	China: Zhou Guohua; Shen Yaqin; Jia Juntingxian; Liu Cuiqing; Zheng Jin*	Athletics	Women's 4*100m Relay T11-13	September 14
Gold	Huang Wenpan	Swimming	Men's 50m Breaststroke SB2	September 14
Gold	Zou Lijuan	Athletics	Women's Shot Put F34	September 14
Gold	Jin Zhipeng	Swimming	Men's 50m Breaststroke SB3	September 14
Gold	Cheng Jiao	Swimming	Women's 50m Breaststroke SB3	September 14
Gold	Xu Jialiang	Swimming	Women's 100m Butterfly S9	September 15
Gold	Wang Jun	Athletics	Women's Shot Put F35	September 15
Gold	Huang Wenpan	Swimming	Men's 200m Freestyle S3	September 15
Gold	Xie Qing	Swimming	Women's 100m Freestyle S11	September 15
Gold	China: Jiang Fenfen; Chen Junfei; Li Yingli; Wen Xiaoyan; Shi Yiting*	Athletics	Women's 4*100m Relay T35-38	September 15
Gold	Zou Liankang	Swimming	Men's 50m Backstroke S2	September 15
Gold	Hu Jianwen	Athletics	Men's Long Jump T38	September 15
Gold	China: Rong Jing; Zhou Jingjing; Zou Xufeng	Wheelchair Fencing	Women's Team épée	September 15
Gold	China: Li Yingjie; Liu Wenjun; Zhou Hongzhuan; Zou Lihong; Huang Lisha*; Ma Jing*	Athletics	Women's 4*400m Relay T53-54	September 15
Gold	Zhou Jiamin	Archery	Women's Individual Compound Open	September 16
Gold	Pan Shiyun	Swimming	Men's 100m Freestyle S7	September 16
Gold	Liu Cuiqing	Athletics	Women's 400m T11	September 16
Gold	Wang Yinan	Swimming	Men's 50m Freestyle S8	September 16
Gold	Cheng Jiao	Swimming	Women's 50m Backstroke S4	September 16
Gold	China: Liu Jing; Xue Juan; Li Qian	Table Tennis	Women's Team C1-3	September 16
Gold	China: Zhao Ping; Feng Panfeng; Zhai Xiang	Table Tennis	Men's Team C3	September 16
Gold	China: Sun Gang; Ye Ruyi; Hu Daoliang	Wheelchair Fencing	Men's Team Foil	September 16
Gold	Huang Wenpan	Swimming	Men's 150m Individual Medlay SM3	September 16
Gold	China: Rong Jing; Zhou Jingjing; Zhang Chuncui	Wheelchair Fencing	Women's Team Foil	September 16
Gold	China: Zhang Bian; Gu Gai; Zhou Ying	Table Tennis	Women's Team C4-5	September 17
Gold	Zhou Xia	Athletics	Women's 200m T35	September 17
Gold	Wu Guoshan	Athletics	Men's Shot Put F57	September 17
Gold	Dong Feixia	Athletics	Women's Discus Throw F55	September 17
Gold	Zheng Jin	Athletics	Women's 1500m T11	September 17
Gold	Zhou Hongzhuan	Athletics	Women's 800m T53	September 17
Gold	Mi Na	Athletics	Women's Discus Throw F38	September 17
Gold	Zhang Li	Swimming	Women's 100m Freestyle S5	September 17
Gold	China: Zhou Cong; Lin Furong; Song Maodang; Wang Yinan	Swimming	Men's 4*100m Medley Relay - 34 Points	September 17
Gold	China: Ge Yang; Lian Hao; Ma Lin	Table Tennis	Men's Team C8-10	September 17
Gold	China: Cui Yanfeng; Liu Yang; Li Huzhao; Liu Chengming; Zhao Yufei*	Athletics	Men's 4*400m Relay T53-54	September 17
Gold	Li Chaoyan	Athletics	Men's Marathon T46	September 18
Gold	Zou Lihong	Athletics	Women's Marathon T54	September 18
Silver	Zhang Cuiping	Shooting	Women's 10 metre air rifle standing SH1	September 8
Silver	Cui Zhe	Powerlifting	Women's -41kg	September 8
Silver	Jia Hongguang	Swimming	Men's 100m Backstroke S6	September 8
Silver	Lu Dong	Swimming	Women's 100m Backstroke S6	September 8
Silver	Xu Haijiao	Swimming	Men's 400m Freestyle S8	September 8
Silver	Jin Zhipeng	Swimming	Men's 100m Freestyle S4	September 8
Silver	Peng Qiuping	Swimming	Women's 100m Freestyle S3	September 8
Silver	Zhou Hongzhuan	Athletics	Women's 100m T53	September 8
Silver	Zhang Ying	Swimming	Women's 100m Backstroke S7	September 8
Silver	Wang Jian	Powerlifting	Men's -54kg	September 9
Silver	Liu Benying	Swimming	Men's 100m Backstroke S2	September 9
Silver	Zheng Tao	Swimming	Men's 50m Butterfly S6	September 9
Silver	Feng Yazhu	Swimming	Women's 100m Backstroke S2	September 9
Silver	Zhou Guohua	Athletics	Women's 100m T11	September 9
Silver	Tang Hongxia	Athletics	Women's Discus Throw F11	September 9
Silver	Cai Liwen	Swimming	Women's 100m Backstroke S11	September 9
Silver	Xu Haijiao	Swimming	Men's 100m Butterfly S8	September 9
Silver	Hu Peng	Powerlifting	Men's -65kg	September 10
Silver	Yang Yiwei	Athletics	Women's 100m T36	September 10
Silver	He Shiwei	Swimming	Men's 50m Butterfly S5	September 10
Silver	Huang Wenpan	Swimming	Men's 50m Backstroke S3	September 10
Silver	Zhou Jufang	Cycling	Women's C4-5 500m Time Trial	September 10
Silver	Mi Na	Athletics	Women's Javelin Throw F37	September 10
Silver	Meng Guofen	Swimming	Women's 50m Backstroke S3	September 10
Silver	Wang Lili	Rowing	Women's single sculls	September 11
Silver	Fei Tianming; Liu Shuang	Rowing	Mixed double sculls	September 11
Silver	Yang Yue	Athletics	Women's Discus Throw F44	September 11
Silver	China: Liu Xinyang; Wei Guoping; Xie Hao	Cycling	Mixed Team Sprint C1-5	September 11
Silver	Song Maodang	Swimming	Men's 100m Freestyle S8	September 11
Silver	Zhou Liankang	Swimming	Men's 200m Freestyle S2	September 11
Silver	Liu Yang	Athletics	Men's 400m T54	September 12
Silver	Zhang Miao	Table Tennis	Women's Singles C4	September 12
Silver	Xu Lili	Powerlifting	Women's -79kg	September 12
Silver	Gu Xiaofei	Powerlifting	Men's -80kg	September 12
Silver	Li Qian	Table Tennis	Women's Singles C3	September 12
Silver	Jin Zhipeng	Swimming	Men's 150m Individual Medlay SM4	September 12
Silver	Gu Gai	Table Tennis	Women's Singles C5	September 12
Silver	Chen Yi	Swimming	Women's 100m Butterfly S10	September 12
Silver	Jia Hongguang	Swimming	Men's 200m Individual Medlay SM6	September 12
Silver	Cheng Jiao	Swimming	Women's 200m Individual Medlay SM6	September 12
Silver	Wen Xiaoyan	Athletics	Women's 400m T37	September 13
Silver	China: Di Dongdong; Sun Qichao; Chen Mingyu; Liu Wei; Fan Zetan*	Athletics	Men's 4*100m Relay T11-13	September 13
Silver	Bian Jing	Wheelchair Fencing	Women's Individual épée A	September 13
Silver	Qi Dong	Powerlifting	Men's -97kg	September 13
Silver	Lei Lina	Table Tennis	Women's Singles C9	September 13
Silver	Song Lingling	Swimming	Women's 400m Freestyle S6	September 13
Silver	Guo Xingyuan	Table Tennis	Men's Singles C4	September 13
Silver	Mi Na	Athletics	Women's Shot Put F37	September 13
Silver	Yang Qian	Table Tennis	Women's Singles C10	September 13
Silver	Guo Chunliang	Athletics	Men's Javelin Throw F46	September 13
Silver	Liu Cuiqing	Athletics	Women's 200m T11	September 13
Silver	Chen Junfei	Athletics	Women's 400m T38	September 14
Silver	Yang Chao	Shooting	Mixed 50 metre pistol SH1	September 14
Silver	Zhou Jingjing	Wheelchair Fencing	Women's Individual Foil B	September 14
Silver	Hu Daoliang	Wheelchair Fencing	Men's Individual Foil B	September 14
Silver	Xia Dong	Athletics	Men's Shot Put F37	September 14
Silver	Li Tingshen	Swimming	Men's 50m Breaststroke SB2	September 14
Silver	Wang Hao	Athletics	Men's Long Jump T47	September 14
Silver	Wu Chunyan	Archery	Women's Individual Recurve Open	September 15
Silver	China: Sun Gang; Tian Jianquan; Hu Daoliang	Wheelchair Fencing	Men's Team épée	September 15
Silver	Yang Bozun	Swimming	Men's 100m Freestyle S11	September 15
Silver	Wang Yanzhang	Athletics	Men's Javelin Throw F34	September 15
Silver	Li Guizhi	Swimming	Women's 100m Freestyle S11	September 15
Silver	Feng Yazhu	Swimming	Women's 50m Backstroke S2	September 15
Silver	Liu Benying	Swimming	Men's 50m Backstroke S2	September 15
Silver	Zhong Huanghao	Athletics	Men's Long Jump T38	September 15
Silver	Zeng Sini	Cycling	Women's C1-2-3 Road Race	September 16
Silver	Chen Zhenyu	Athletics	Men's Shot Put F40	September 16
Silver	Lin Yueshan	Archery	Women's Individual Compound Open	September 16
Silver	Liu Xiaobing	Swimming	Men's 100m Backstroke S9	September 16
Silver	Liu Yuntao	Swimming	Men's 50m Backstroke S4	September 16
Silver	Deng Yue	Swimming	Women's 50m Backstroke S4	September 16
Silver	China: Chen Fengqing; Sun Le; Zhang Wei; Ju Zhen; Zhang Huiwen; Zhang Kaimei	Goalball	Women's Team	September 16
Silver	Chen Hongjie	Athletics	Men's High Jump T47	September 16
Silver	Wu Qing	Athletics	Women's Shot Put F36	September 17
Silver	China: Yang Qian; Lei Lina; Xiong Guiyan	Table Tennis	Women's Team C6-10	September 17
Silver	Song Maodang	Swimming	Men's 200m Individual Medley SM8	September 17
Silver	Liu Wenjun	Athletics	Women's 800m T54	September 17
Silver	Hu Jianwen	Athletics	Men's 400m T38	September 17
Silver	Liu Yang	Athletics	Men's 100m T54	September 17
Silver	China women's national sitting volleyball team: Li Ting; Lyu Hongqin; Jiang Jixiu; Su Limei; Gong Bin; Wang Yanan; Li Liping; Zhang Xufei; Xu Jie; Zhang Lijun; Sheng Yuhong; Zhao Meiling	Sitting Volleyball	Women's Team	September 17
Bronze	Yan Yaping	Shooting	Women's 10 metre air rifle standing SH1	September 8
Bronze	Wang Yinan	Swimming	Men's 400m Freestyle S8	September 8
Bronze	Xia Zhiwei	Athletics	Men's Shot Put F41	September 8
Bronze	Xia Dong	Athletics	Men's Discus Throw F37	September 8
Bronze	Yang Quanxi	Powerlifting	Men's -59kg	September 9
Bronze	Wang Lichao	Swimming	Men's 50m Butterfly S6	September 9
Bronze	Chen Yi	Swimming	Women's 50m Freestyle S10	September 9
Bronze	Liu Cuiping	Athletics	Women's 100m T11	September 9
Bronze	Li Yingjie	Athletics	Women's 100m T54	September 9
Bronze	Li Huzhao	Athletics	Men's 100m T53	September 9
Bronze	Xu Jialing	Swimming	Women's 400m Freestyle S9	September 9
Bronze	Yang Guanglong	Swimming	Men's 100m Butterfly S8	September 9
Bronze	Song Zhenling	Cycling	Women's C1-2-3 500m Time Trial	September 10
Bronze	Xiao Cuijuan	Powerlifting	Men's -55kg	September 10
Bronze	Yang Hong	Swimming	Men's 100m Breaststroke SB7	September 10
Bronze	Jia Hongguang	Swimming	Men's 50m Freestyle S6	September 10
Bronze	Ruan Jianping	Cycling	Women's C4-5 500m Time Trial	September 10
Bronze	Jia Qianqian	Athletics	Women's Javelin Throw F37	September 10
Bronze	Xie Qing	Swimming	Women's 400m Freestyle S11	September 10
Bronze	Yang Yan	Powerlifting	Women's -61kg	September 11
Bronze	Sun Pengxiang	Athletics	Men's Javelin Throw F41	September 11
Bronze	Zou Lihong	Athletics	Women's 400m T54	September 11
Bronze	Song Lingling	Swimming	Women's 100m Breaststroke SB5	September 11
Bronze	Yan Shuo	Table Tennis	Men's Singles C7	September 12
Bronze	Tian Jianquan	Wheelchair Fencing	Men's Individual Sabre A	September 12
Bronze	Deng Yue	Swimming	Women's 150m Individual Medlay SM4	September 12
Bronze	Yang Bozun	Swimming	Men's 50m Freestyle S11	September 12
Bronze	Wang Jingang	Swimming	Men's 50m Butterfly S7	September 12
Bronze	Tian Jianquan	Wheelchair Fencing	Men's Individual Épée A	September 13
Bronze	Zhou Guohua	Athletics	Women's 200m T11	September 13
Bronze	Wang Jiexin	Swimming	Women's 50m Freestyle S9	September 13
Bronze	Li Hanhua	Swimming	Men's 50m Freestyle S3	September 13
Bronze	Jin Zhipeng	Swimming	Men's 200m Freestyle S4	September 13
Bronze	Liang Guihua	Cycling	Men's C2 Time Trial	September 14
Bronze	Zeng Sini	Cycling	Women's C1-2-3 Time Trial	September 14
Bronze	Yao Fang	Wheelchair Fencing	Women's Individual Foil B	September 14
Bronze	Sun Gang	Wheelchair Fencing	Men's Individual Foil A	September 14
Bronze	Huang Chaowen	Swimming	Men's 50m Breaststroke SB2	September 14
Bronze	China: Song Maodang; Xu Haijiao; Lin Furong; Wang Yinan	Swimming	Men's 4*100m Freestyle Relay - 34 Points	September 14
Bronze	Li Hanhua	Swimming	Men's 200m Freestyle S3	September 15
Bronze	China: Song Lingling; Chen Yi; Lin Ping; Xu Jialing	Swimming	Women's 4*100m Freestyle Relay - 34 Points	September 15
Bronze	Li Lu	Athletics	Women's 200m T47	September 16
Bronze	Yan Zhiqiang	Boccia	Mixed Individual BC2	September 16
Bronze	Huang Yajing	Swimming	Women's 100m Freestyle S7	September 16
Bronze	Jiang Shengnan	Swimming	Women's 50m Freestyle S8	September 16
Bronze	Li Cuiqing	Athletics	Men's Shot Put F36	September 16
Bronze	Yang Bozun	Swimming	Men's 200m Individual Medlay SM11	September 16
Bronze	Xie Qing	Swimming	Women's 200m Individual Medlay SM11	September 16
Bronze	Du Jianping	Swimming	Men's 150m Individual Medlay SM3	September 16
Bronze	Xu Haijiao	Swimming	Men's 200m Individual Medlay SM8	September 17
Bronze	Li Yingli	Athletics	Women's 800m T54	September 17

* – Indicates ①track&field athlete only sign up in the heats, but not ran in the final race.②swimming athlete only swam in the heats but not in the final race.③archer athlete only shoot in the ranking round, but not in the Olympic rounds.

Medals by sport
Sport	1st place, gold medalist(s)	2nd place, silver medalist(s)	3rd place, bronze medalist(s)	Total
Swimming	37	30	25	92
Athletics	32	23	12	67
Table Tennis	13	7	1	21
Wheelchair Fencing	9	4	4	17
Shooting	5	2	1	8
Powerlifting	3	6	3	12
Cycling	3	3	4	10
Archery	3	2	0	5
Judo	2	0	0	2
Rowing	0	2	0	2
Goalball	0	1	0	1
Sitting Volleyball	0	1	0	1
Boccia	0	0	1	1
Total	107	81	51	239

Medals by day
Day	Date	1st place, gold medalist(s)	2nd place, silver medalist(s)	3rd place, bronze medalist(s)	Total
1	September 8	7	9	4	20
2	September 9	13	8	8	29
3	September 10	6	7	7	20
4	September 11	13	6	4	23
5	September 12	11	10	5	26
6	September 13	13	11	5	29
7	September 14	12	7	6	25
8	September 15	9	8	2	19
9	September 16	10	8	8	26
10	September 17	11	7	2	20
11	September 18	2	0	0	2
	Total	107	81	51	239

Medals by gender^{(Comparison graphs)}
Gender	1st place, gold medalist(s)	2nd place, silver medalist(s)	3rd place, bronze medalist(s)	Total	Percentage
Male	46	39	26	111	46.4%
Female	58	41	25	124	51.9%
Mixed	3	1	0	4	1.7%
Total	107	81	51	239	100%

== 5-a-side football ==
China qualified for the Paralympics after finishing second at the 2015 IBSA Blind Football Aaian Championships.

=== Rosters ===
Coach: Zou Hongmou (CHN), Xu Tao (CHN) Guide: Wang Guishun (CHN) The following is the China squad in the football 5-a-side tournament of the 2016 Summer Paralympics.

No.	Pos.	Player	Class	Date of birth (age)
1	GK	Song Zhe	Sighted	7 January 1993 (aged 23)
3	DF	Liu Meng	B1	1 July 1995 (aged 21)
4	MF	Wei Jiansen	B1	11 October 1991 (aged 24)
5	DF	Gao Kai	B1	26 January 1987 (aged 29)
6	FW	Lin Dongdong	B1	12 May 1990 (aged 26)
7	FW	Yu Yutan	B1	1 January 1989 (aged 27)
8	DF	Zhang Lijing	B1	25 August 1994 (aged 22)
9	MF	Wang Zhoubin	B1	14 October 1989 (aged 26)
11	MF	Wang Yafeng	B1	25 March 1990 (aged 26)
12	GK	Xu Huachu	Sighted	4 May 1991 (aged 25)

=== Group B ===
Pos	Team	Pld	W	D	L	GF	GA	GD	Pts	Qualification
1	Argentina	3	2	1	0	3	0	+3	7	Semi finals
2	China	3	2	1	0	3	0	+3	7	Semi finals
3	Spain	3	1	0	2	1	2	−1	3	5th–6th place match
4	Mexico	3	0	0	3	0	5	−5	0	7th–8th place match

Source: Paralympic.org
9 September 2016
11:00

Spain	0–1	China
	Report	Wang Z. 43'

Olympic Tennis Centre, Rio de Janeiro
Attendance: 2,569
Referee: Germi Guimaraes (Brazil)

11 September 2016
20:00

China	2–0	Mexico
Wei 4'; Wang Y. 9'	Report

Olympic Tennis Centre, Rio de Janeiro
Attendance: 3,099
Referee: Germi Guimaraes (Brazil)

13 September 2016
11:00

China	0–0	Argentina
	Report

Olympic Tennis Centre, Rio de Janeiro
Attendance: 2,355
Referee: François Carcouët (France)

=== Semi-final ===
15 September 2016
16:00

Brazil	2–1	China
Jefinho 20', 30'	Report	Wang Y. 14'

Olympic Tennis Centre, Rio de Janeiro
Attendance: 3,026
Referee: Mariano Travaglino (Argentina)

=== Bronze-medal match ===
17 September 2016
14:00

China	0–0	Argentina
	Report
Penalties
Wei (penalty missed); Liu (penalty missed); Wang Y. (penalty missed)	0–1	(penalty scored) Espinillo; (penalty missed) Velo

Olympic Tennis Centre, Rio de Janeiro
Attendance: 2,900
Referee: Germi Guimaraes (Brazil)

== Archery ==
With the 2015 World Archery Para Championships serving as a Paralympic qualifying event, several Chinese archers assisted the country in earning spots for Rio. This included the Chinese recurve open mixed team, and China's W1 pair claimed the first two spots for China at the event. Yu He and Zhao Lixue claimed the maximum two spots per nation for China in the recurve men's open event. Gao Fangxia claimed a spot for China as a result of her win in the women's Paralympic secondary tournament. China claimed a pair of spots in the mixed team compound open event after one of their teams set a world record of 157 points on their way to claiming gold in the finals. Zhou Jiamin earned China an additional spot with her sixth-place finish in the women's event. China earned a pair of spots in the W1 women's event after Guo Ying won gold and Zhang Lu finished fourth.

Men

Athlete	Event	Ranking round		Round of 32	Round of 16	Quarterfinals	Semifinals	Finals	
Athlete	Event	Score	Seed	Opposition score	Opposition score	Opposition score	Opposition score	Opposition score	Rank
Ai Xinliang	Men's individual compound open	668	14	Matteo Bonacina (ITA); W 143-135	Hadi Nori (IRI); W 138-134	Marcel Pavlik (SVK); W 142-138	Alberto Luigi Simonelli (ITA); L 144-146	Jonathon Milne (AUS); L 142-145	4
Cao Hanwen	Men's individual compound open	666	16	Erdoğan Aygan (TUR); L 142-143	Did Not Advance				
Liu Huanan	Men's individual compound W1	475	15	David Drahonínský (CZE); L 84-142	Did Not Advance				
Shi Xucheng	Men's individual recurve open	602	14	Maxime Guerin (FRA); W 7-1	Maik Szarszewski (GER); L 3-7	Did Not Advance			
Yu He	Men's individual recurve open	583	21	Sampath Bandara Megahamulea (SRI); W 7-3	Gholamreza Rahimi (IRI); L 0-6	Did Not Advance			
Zhao Lixue	Men's individual recurve open	609	11	Jawad Al-Musawi (IRQ); W 6-0	Luciano Rezende (BRA); L 4-6	Did Not Advance			

Women

Athlete	Event	Ranking round		Round of 32	Round of 16	Quarterfinals	Semifinals	Finals	
Athlete	Event	Score	Seed	Opposition score	Opposition score	Opposition score	Opposition score	Opposition score	Rank
Lin Dandan	Women's Individual Recurve Open	618	5	Thais Silva Carvalho (BRA); L 3-7	Did Not Advance				
Wu Chunyan	Women's Individual Recurve Open	637	1	Patricia Layolle (BRA); W 6-0	Oyun-Erdene Buyanjargal (MGL); W 7-3	Roksolana Dzoba-Balyan (UKR); W 6-4	Milena Olszewska (POL); W 7-1	Zahra Nemati (IRI); L 4-6	2nd place, silver medalist(s)
Ye Jinyan	Women's Individual Recurve Open	622	3	Ha Sam Suk (KOR); W 7-1	Zehra Ozbey Torun (TUR); L 2-6	Did Not Advance			
Lin Yueshan	Women's Individual Compound Open	651	6	Bye	Choi Yuen Lung (HKG); W 141-130	Jane Karla Gogel (BRA); W 141-139	Somayeh Abbaspour (IRI); W 137-129	Zhou Jiamin (CHN); L 138-138	2nd place, silver medalist(s)
Zhou Jiamin	Women's Individual Compound Open	674	1	Bye	Maria Carmen Rubio Larrion (ESP); W 144-136	Handan Biroglu (TUR); W 144-132	Kim Mi Soon (KOR); W 138-132	Lin Yueshan (CHN); W 138-138	1st place, gold medalist(s)
Lu Liang	Women's individual compound W1	598	4	—N/a	Bye	Vicky Jenkins (GBR); L 128-130	Did Not Advance		

Mixed

Athlete	Event	Ranking round		Round of 32	Round of 16	Quarterfinals	Semifinals	Finals	
Athlete	Event	Score	Seed	Opposition score	Opposition score	Opposition score	Opposition score	Opposition score	Rank
Wu Chunyan; Zhao Lixue; Shi Xucheng*; Lin Dandan*; Yu He*; Ye Jinyan*	Team Recurve Open	1246	2	—N/a	Czech Republic (CZE); W 6-0	Thailand (THA); W 6-0	Mongolia (MGL); W 6-0	Iran (IRI); W 5-3	1st place, gold medalist(s)
Ai Xinliang; Zhou Jiamin; Cao Hanwen*; Lin Yueshan*	Team Compound Open	1342	2	—N/a	Bye	Canada (CAN); W 155-143	Turkey (TUR); W 149-139	Great Britain (GBR); W 151-143	1st place, gold medalist(s)
Liu Huanan; Lu Liang	Team Compound W1	1073	7	—N/a		South Korea (KOR); L 95-137	Did Not Advance		

* – Indicates athlete only shoot in the Ranking Round but not in the Olympic Rounds.

== Athletics ==
=== T/F 11-13 ===
Men's Track

Athlete	Guide	Events	Heat		Semifinal		Final	
Athlete	Guide	Events	Time	Rank	Time	Rank	Time	Rank
Di Dongdong	Wang Lin	100 m T11	11.21	2 q	11.28	1 Q	11.32	4
Chen Mingyu	-	100 m T12	11.42	2	Did Not Advance			
Liu Wei	-	100 m T13	11.03	2Q	—N/a		11.05	6
Di Dongdong	Wang Lin	200 m T11	23.39	3 q	23.22	3	Did Not Advance	
Fan Zetan	Huang Zhihui	200 m T11	23.33	2 q	23.15	2 q	23.24	4
Sun Qichao		200 m T12	23.06	4	Did Not Advance			
Fan Zetan	Huang Zhihui	400 m T11	DQ		Did Not Advance			
Sun Qichao	-	400 m T12	49.58	2q	49.28	1Q	48.57	1st place, gold medalist(s)
Zhang Zhen	-	1500 m T11	4:16.88	4	—N/a		Did Not Advance	
Zhang Zhen	Zhang Mingyang	5000 m T11	—N/a				15:53.47	5
Di Dongdong; Sun Qichao; Chen Mengyu; Liu Wei; Fan Zetan*	Wang Lin; Huang Zhihui*	4 × 100 m Relay T11-13	43.01	1Q	—N/a		43.05	2nd place, silver medalist(s)

Men's Field

Athlete	Events	Mark(m)	Rank
Chen Xingyu	Long Jump T11	5.74	7
Chen Mingyu	Long Jump T12	7.01	4
Zhu Pengkai	Javalin Throw F13	57.96	6

Women's Track

Athlete	Guide	Events	Heat		Semifinal		Final	
Athlete	Guide	Events	Time	Rank	Time	Rank	Time	Rank
Jia Juntingxian	Shi Yang	100 m T11	12.58	2q	12.56	4	Did Not Advance	
Zhou Guohua	Jia Dengpu	100 m T11	12.17	=1Q	12.08	2 q	11.98	2nd place, silver medalist(s)
Liu Cuiqing	Xu Donglin	100 m T11	12.03	1Q	11.96 WR	1Q	12.07	3rd place, bronze medalist(s)
Shen Yaqin	Li Wen	100 m T12	12.64	2q	12.55	4	Did Not Advance	
Liu Cuiqing	Xu Donglin	200 m T11	25.17	1Q	25.21	1Q	24.85	2nd place, silver medalist(s)
Zhou Guohua	Jia Dengpu	200 m T11	25.21	2 q	25.07	2 q	24.99	3rd place, bronze medalist(s)
Liu Cuiqing	Xu Donglin	400 m T11	56.31	1 Q	—N/a		56.71	1st place, gold medalist(s)
Zhou Guohua	Jia Dengpu	400 m T11	58.87	2	—N/a		Did Not Advance	
Shen Yaqin	Li Wen	400 m T12	DQ		—N/a		Did Not Advance	
Zheng Jin	Jin Yubo	1500 m T11	4:47.36	1Q	—N/a		4:38.92 WR	1st place, gold medalist(s)
Zheng Jin	-	Marathon T12	—N/a				3:19:46 WR	4
Zhou Guohua; Shen Yaqin; Jia Juntingxian; Liu Cuiqing; Zheng Jin*	Jia Dengpu; Li Wen; Shiyang; Xu Donglin; Jin Yubo*	4 × 100 m Relay T11-13	—N/a				47.18 WR	1st place, gold medalist(s)

Women's Field

Athlete	Events	Mark(m)	Rank
Zhang Liangmin	Discus Throw F11	36.65	1st place, gold medalist(s)
Tang Hongxia	Discus Throw F11	35.01	2nd place, silver medalist(s)
Zhao Yuping	Shot Put F12	12.19	5
Zhang Liangmin	Shot Put F12	11.12	7
Tang Hongxia	Shot Put F12	10.94	9
Jia Juntingxian	Long Jump T11	4.63	4
Zhao Yuping	Javalin Throw F13	39.59	4

=== T/F 31-38 ===
Men's Track

Athlete	Events	Heat		Final	
Athlete	Events	Time	Rank	Time	Rank
Fu Xinhan	100 m T35	13.21	2 Q	13.08	4
Che Mian	100 m T36	—N/a		12.72	4
Xu Ran	100 m T36	—N/a		12.96	7
Yang Yifei	100 m T36	—N/a		12.20	2nd place, silver medalist(s)
Shang Guangxu	100 m T37	11.53	3 Q	11.76	5
Hu Jianwen	100 m T38	10.93	1 Q	10.74 WR	1st place, gold medalist(s)
Zhou Wenjun	100 m T38	11.34	3 Q	11.34	5
Zhong Huanghao	100 m T38	11.65	4 q	11.66	6
Fu Xinhan	200 m T35	DQ		Did Not Advance	
Che Mian	400 m T36	—N/a		57.26	5
Wu Jialong	400 m T37	55.54	2 Q	55.51	6
Shang Guangxu	400 m T37	58.12	6	Did Not Advance	
Hu Jianwen	400 m T38	58.37	3 Q	50.27	2nd place, silver medalist(s)
Zhou Wenjun	400 m T38	54.53	2 Q	52.43	5
Zhong Huanghao	400 m T38	55.99	4 q	55.06	8

Men's Field

Athlete	Events	Mark(m)	Rank
Xia Dong	Discus Throw F37	52.15	3rd place, bronze medalist(s)
Wang Yanzhang	Shot Put F34	10.86	4
Fu Xinhan	Shot Put F35	15.19	1st place, gold medalist(s)
Li Cuiqing	Shot Put F36	14.02	3rd place, bronze medalist(s)
Xia Dong	Shot Put F37	16.06	2nd place, silver medalist(s)
Wang Yanzhang	Javalin Throw F34	34.15	2nd place, silver medalist(s)
An Dongquan	Javalin Throw F38	47.90	4
Yang Yifei	Long Jump T36	5.12	7
Xu Ran	Long Jump T36	4.95	8
Shang Guangxu	Long Jump T37	6.77 WR	1st place, gold medalist(s)
Wu Jialong	Long Jump T37	5.34	11
Hu Jianwen	Long Jump T38	6.64	1st place, gold medalist(s)
Zhong Huanghao	Long Jump T38	6.59	2nd place, silver medalist(s)

Women's Track

Athlete	Events	Heat		Final	
Athlete	Events	Time	Rank	Time	Rank
Zhou Xia	100 m T35	—N/a		13.66	1st place, gold medalist(s)
Li Yingli	100 m T37	14.25	4 q	14.05	5
Chen Junfei	100 m T38	13.03	3 q	13.06	4
Zhou Xia	200 m T35	—N/a		28.22 WR	1st place, gold medalist(s)
Shi Yiting	200 m T36	30.87	1 Q	28.74	1st place, gold medalist(s)
Jiang Fenfen	400 m T37	1:05.68	3 Q	1:05.66	4
Wen Xiaoyan	400 m T37	1:03.73	1 Q	1:03.28	2nd place, silver medalist(s)
Li Yingli	400 m T37	1:08.84	4 q	1:07.45	6
Chen Junfei	400 m T38	—N/a		1:01.34	2nd place, silver medalist(s)
Jiang Fenfen; Chen Junfei; Li Yingli; Wen Xiaoyan; Shi Yiting*	4 × 100 m Relay T35-38	—N/a		50.81 WR	1st place, gold medalist(s)

Women's Field

Athlete	Events	Mark(m)	Rank
Wen Xiaoyan	Long Jump T37	5.14 WR	1st place, gold medalist(s)
Chen Junfei	Long Jump T38	4.77	1st place, gold medalist(s)
Zou Lijuan	Javelin Throw F34	21.86 WR	1st place, gold medalist(s)
Jia Qianqian	Javelin Throw F37	29.47	3rd place, bronze medalist(s)
Mi Na	Javelin Throw F37	30.18	2nd place, silver medalist(s)
Zou Lijuan	Shot Put F34	8.75 WR	1st place, gold medalist(s)
Wang Jun	Shot Put F35	13.91 WR	1st place, gold medalist(s)
Wu Qing	Shot Put F36	10.33	2nd place, silver medalist(s)
Jia Qianqian	Shot Put F37	9.85	5
Mi Na	Shot Put F37	13.73	2nd place, silver medalist(s)
Mi Na	Discus Throw F38	37.60 WR	1st place, gold medalist(s)
Jia Qianqian	Discus Throw F38	26.65	10

=== F40-41 ===
Men's Field

Athlete	Events	Mark(m)	Rank
Sun Pengxiang	Javelin Throw F41	41.81	3rd place, bronze medalist(s)
Shen Tongqing	Javelin Throw F41	40.19	4
Lin Keli	Shot Put F40	9.16	4
Chen Zhenyu	Shot Put F40	10.10	2nd place, silver medalist(s)
Wang Wei	Shot Put F40	8.50	7
Sun Pengxiang	Shot Put F41	10.85	6
Xia Zhiwei	Shot Put F41	12.33	3rd place, bronze medalist(s)

Women's Field

Athlete	Events	Mark(m)	Rank
Zhang Fengju	Discus Throw F41	17.52	11
Zhang Fengju	Shot Put F40	7.06	4

=== T/F 42-47 ===
Men's Track

Athlete	Events	Heat		Final	
Athlete	Events	Time	Rank	Time	Rank
Wang Hao	100 m T47	10.95	3 Q	11.03	4
Li Chaoyan	1500 m T46	—N/a		did not finish	
Li Chaoyan	Marathon T46	—N/a		2:33:35	1st place, gold medalist(s)

Men's Field

Athlete	Events	Mark(m)	Rank
Wang Hao	Long Jump T47	7.30	2nd place, silver medalist(s)
Liu Fuliang	Long Jump T47	7.09	4
Chen Hongjie	Long Jump T47	6.59	9
Chen Hongjie	High Jump T47	1.99	2nd place, silver medalist(s)
Zhao Yalong	High Jump T47	1.80	8
Zhou Wu	High Jump T47	1.93	5
Guo Chunliang	Javelin Throw F46	59.93	2nd place, silver medalist(s)
Kang Guofen	Shot Put F42	12.84	9

Women's Track

Athlete	Events	Heat		Final	
Athlete	Events	Time	Rank	Time	Rank
Li Lu	200 m T47	27.20	3 Q	26.26	3rd place, bronze medalist(s)
Li Lu	400 m T47	1:00.77	1Q	58.09	1st place, gold medalist(s)

Women's Field

Athlete	Events	Mark(m)	Rank
Yang Yue	Discus Throw F44	43.47	2nd place, silver medalist(s)
Yao Juan	Discus Throw F44	44.53 WR	1st place, gold medalist(s)
Zhao Hongmei	Javalin Throw F44	39.82	4

=== T/F 51-58 ===
Men's Track

Athlete	Events	Heat		Final	
Athlete	Events	Time	Rank	Time	Rank
Li Huzhao	100 m T53	14.97	3 q	14.85	3rd place, bronze medalist(s)
Yu Shiran	100 m T53	15.24	3	Did Not Advance	
Zhao Yufei	100 m T53	15.17	4	Did Not Advance	
Cui Yanfeng	100 m T54	14.39	2 Q	14.32	5
Liu Yang	100 m T54	14.11	1 Q	14.10	2nd place, silver medalist(s)
Li Huzhao	400 m T53	49.48	2 q	50.11	4
Yu Siran	400 m T53	51.51	3	Did Not Advance	
Zhao Yufei	400 m T53	49.99	2 Q	50.42	6
Cui Yanfeng	400 m T54	47.61	2 Q	47.63	6
Liu Chengming	400 m T54	46.87	1 Q	47.69	8
Liu Yang	400 m T54	46.42	1 Q	46.79	2nd place, silver medalist(s)
Li Huzhao	800 m T53	1:37.77	2 q	1:41.91	6
Zhao Yufei	800 m T53	1:44.46	5	Did Not Advance	
Cui Yanfeng	800 m T54	1:37.84	2 Q	1:35.03	4
Liu Chengming	800 m T54	1:38.54	3	Did Not Advance	
Liu Yang	800 m T54	1:36.51	4 q	1:35.18	5
Liu Chengming	1500 m T54	3:05.41	3 Q	3:01.84	7
Liu Yang	5000 m T54	10:38.46	4	Did Not Advance	
Liu Chengming	Marathon T54	—N/a		1:30:09	4
Cui Yanfeng; Liu Yang; Li Huzhao; Liu Chengming; Zhao Yufei*	4 × 400 m Relay T53-54	3:04.77 WR	1 Q	3:04.58 (1st race 3:03.12 WR)	1st place, gold medalist(s)

Men's Field

Athlete	Events	Mark(m)	Rank
Wu Guoshan	Javelin Throw F57	32.31	11
Wu Guoshan	Shot Put F57	14.42	1st place, gold medalist(s)

Women's Track

Athlete	Events	Heat		Final	
Athlete	Events	Time	Rank	Time	Rank
Huang Lisha	100 m T53	16.19 WR	1 Q	16.28	1st place, gold medalist(s)
Zhou Hongzhuan	100 m T53	16.64	1 Q	16.51	2nd place, silver medalist(s)
Liu Wenjun	100 m T54	16.00	1 Q	16.00	1st place, gold medalist(s)
Li Yingjie	100 m T54	16.42	1 Q	16.22	3rd place, bronze medalist(s)
Huang Lisha	400 m T53	55.63	3 Q	55.52	4
Zhou Hongzhuan	400 m T53	55.42	1 Q	54.43 WR	1st place, gold medalist(s)
Liu Wenjun	400 m T54	54.90	2 Q	54.72	4
Ma Jing	400 m T54	56.38	3 Q	55.83	6
Zou Lihong	400 m T54	54.93	2 Q	54.70	2nd place, silver medalist(s)
Huang Lisha	800 m T53	1:53.76	2 Q	1:52.15	7
Zhou Hongzhuan	800 m T53	1:48.37	1 Q	1:47.45 WR	1st place, gold medalist(s)
Liu Wenjun	800 m T54	1:48.27	2 Q	1:45.02	2nd place, silver medalist(s)
Li Yingjie	800 m T54	1:48.66	4 q	1:45.23	3rd place, bronze medalist(s)
Zou Lihong	800 m T54	1:49.62	2 Q	1:46.18	6
Ma Jing	1500 m T54	3:28.63	5 q	3:24.88	7
Zou Lihong	5000 m T54	11:49.52	3 Q	11:55.10	5
Ma Jing	5000 m T54	12:08.49	3 Q	11:57.20	6
Zou Lihong	Marathon T54	—N/a		1:38:44	1st place, gold medalist(s)
Ma Jing	Marathon T54	—N/a		1:51:48	11
Li Yingjie; Liu Wenjun; Zhou Hongzhuan; Zou Lihong; Huang Lisha*; Ma Jing*	4 × 400 m Relay T53-54	—N/a		3:32.11 WR	1st place, gold medalist(s)

Women's Field

Athlete	Events	Mark(m)	Rank
Yang Liwan	Javelin Throw F54	17.52	4
Dong Feixia	Javelin Throw F55-56	14.33	9
Yang Liwan	Shot Put F54	7.89	1st place, gold medalist(s)
Dong Feixia	Discus Throw F55	25.03	1st place, gold medalist(s)
Yang Liwan	Discus Throw F55	19.08	5

Qualifiers for the latter rounds (Q or q) of track events were decided on time, therefore positions shown are results versus competitors in their own heats.
* – Indicates athlete only sign up in the heats but not ran in the final race.

== Boccia ==
China qualified for the 2016 Summer Paralympics in this sport at the Hong Kong hosted 2015 BISFed Asia and Oceania Boccia Team and Pairs Championships in the BC4 Pair event. They claimed gold ahead of silver medalist South Korea and bronze medalists Hong Kong. They blanked South Korea 5 - 0 in the gold medal game. The pair team included Yuansen Zheng and ximei Lin, and they were ranked second in the world at the time. They entered qualification as the number two seed in Asia in their event, behind eventual bronze medalists Hong Kong who were then ranked third in the world.

Individual

Athlete	Event	Pool Matches				Quarterfinals	Semifinals	Final/BM	
Athlete	Event	Opposition Result	Opposition Result	Opposition Result	Rank	Opposition Result	Opposition Result	Opposition Result	Rank
Sun Kai	Individual BC1	Jose Carlos Chagas (BRA); L 2-3	Pattaya Tadtong (THA); L 2-6	Fujll Yuriko (JPN); W 4-4	3	Did Not Advance			
Zhang Qi	Individual BC1	Antonio Marques (POR); L 2-3	David Smith (GBR); L 2-4	Jakub Nagy (SVK); W 5-3	3	Did Not Advance			
Yan Zhiqiang	Individual BC2	Fernando Ferreira (POR); W 8-1	Yeung Hiu Lam (HKG); W 8-0	—N/a	1 Q	Sohn Jeong Min (KOR); W 4-2	Vongsa Watcharaphon (THA); L 0-11	Jeong So Yeong (KOR); W 5-4	3rd place, bronze medalist(s)
Zhong Kai	Individual BC2	Lucas de Araujo (BRA); L 0-9	Abilio Valente (POR); L 2-2	—N/a	3	Did Not Advance			
Lin Ximei	Individual BC4	Zheng Yuansen (CHN); L 3-4	Marco Dispaltro (CAN); W 6-1	Alison Levine (CAN); L 1-6	3	Did Not Advance			
Zheng Yuansen	Individual BC4	Lin Ximei (CHN); W 4-3	Alison Levine (CAN); W 5-2	Marco Dispaltro (CAN); W 9-0	1 Q	Samuel Andrejcik (SVK); L 0-5	Did Not Advance		

Pairs

Athlete	Event	Group Stage				Semifinals	Final	
Athlete	Event	Opposition Result	Opposition Result	Opposition Result	Rank	Opposition Result	Opposition Result	Rank
Lin Ximei; Zheng Yuansen	Pairs BC4	Thailand (THA); L 2-6	Canada (CAN); L 2-3	Brazil (BRA); L 4-4	4	Did Not Advance		

Teams

Athlete	Event	Group Stage			Quarterfinals	Semifinals	Final	
Athlete	Event	Opposition Result	Opposition Result	Rank	Opposition Result	Opposition Result	Opposition Result	Rank
Sun Kai; Zhang Qi; Yan Zhiqiang; Zhong Kai	Team BC1-2	South Korea (KOR); W 5-5	Thailand (THA); L 4-11	2 Q	Japan (JPN); L 5-5	Did Not Advence		

== Cycling ==
With one pathway for qualification being one highest ranked NPCs on the UCI Para-Cycling male and female Nations Ranking Lists on 31 December 2014, China qualified for the 2016 Summer Paralympics in Rio, assuming they continued to meet all other eligibility requirements.

=== Track ===
Time Trial

Athlete	Event	Results	
Athlete	Event	Time	Rank
Li Zhangyu	Men's Time Trial C1-3	1:06.678 WR	1st place, gold medalist(s)
Liang Guihua	Men's Time Trial C1-3	1:10.347	4
Xie Hao	Men's Time Trial C1-3	1:12.409	9
Li Jieli	Women's Time Trial C1-3	Did Not Start	
Song Zhenling	Women's Time Trial C1-3	40.020	3rd place, bronze medalist(s)
Zeng Sini	Women's Time Trial C1-3	41.114	4
Ruan Jianping	Women's Time Trial C4-5	36.557	3rd place, bronze medalist(s)
Zhou Jufang	Women's Time Trial C4-5	36.004 WR	2nd place, silver medalist(s)

Individual Pursuit

Athlete	Event	Qualification		Final		
Athlete	Event	Time	Rank	Opposition	Time	Rank
Li Zhangyu	Men's Individual Pursuit C1	3:50.373 WR	1 Q	Ross Wilson (CAN) W	2:28.789(OVL)	1st place, gold medalist(s)
Liang Guihua	Men's Individual Pursuit C2	3:42.916	1 Q	Tristen Chernove (CAN) W	3:44.553	1st place, gold medalist(s)
Liu Xinyang	Men's Individual Pursuit C5	4:43.304	5	Did Not Advance		
Li Jieli	Women's Individual Pursuit C1-3	4:43.367	10	Did Not Advance		
Song Zhenling	Women's Individual Pursuit C1-3	4:28.102	7	Did Not Advance		
Zeng Sini	Women's Individual Pursuit C1-3	4:15.386	4 Q	Alyda Norbruis (NED); L	4.17.730	4
Ruan Jianping	Women's Individual Pursuit C4	4:11.283	7	Did Not Advance		
Zhou Jufang	Women's Individual Pursuit C5	3:56.486	5	Did Not Advance		

Sprint

Athlete	Event	Qualification		Final		
Athlete	Event	Time	Rank	Opposition	Time	Rank
Liu Xinyang; Wei Guoping; Xie Hao	Mixed Team Sprint C1-5	50.084	2 Q	Great Britain (GBR); L	49.914	2nd place, silver medalist(s)

=== Road ===
Time Trial

Athlete	Event	Results	
Athlete	Event	Time	Rank
Liang Guihua	Men's Time Trial C2	28:17.77	3rd place, bronze medalist(s)
Zhou Jufang	Women's Time Trial C5	Did Not Start	
Ruan Jianping	Women's Time Trial C4	32:46.66	7
Li Zhangyu	Men's Time Trial C1	30:00.77	6
Zeng Sini	Women's Time Trial C1-2-3	30:41.42	3rd place, bronze medalist(s)
Song Zhenling	Women's Time Trial C1-2-3	32:36.92	9
Li Huaxian	Women's Time Trial H1-2-3	36:09.52	7
Liu Xinyang	Men's Time Trial C5	39:55.90	7

Road Race

Athlete	Event	Results	
Athlete	Event	Time	Rank
Li Huaxian	Women's Road Race H1-2-3-4	1:22:17	6
Liang Guihua	Men's Road Race C1-2-3	2:01:55	26
Xie Hao	Men's Road Race C1-2-3	Did Not Finish	
Li Zhangyu	Men's Road Race C1-2-3	Did Not Finish	
Zeng Sini	Women's Road Race C1-2-3	1:30:14	2nd place, silver medalist(s)
Song Zhenling	Women's Road Race C1-2-3	1:30:40	6
Ruan Jianping	Women's Road Race C4-5	2:28:54	11
Zhou Jufang	Women's Road Race C4-5	Did Not Finish	
Wei Guoping	Men's Road Race C4-5	Did Not Finish	
Liu Xinyang	Men's Road Race C4-5	Did Not Finish	

== Goalball ==
=== Men ===
The China men's national goalball team qualified for the Rio Games after finishing first at the 2015 IBSA Goalball Asian-Pacific Championships. China's men enter the tournament ranked 3rd in the world.

==== Rosters ====
The following is the China roster in the men's goalball tournament of the 2016 Summer Paralympics.

No.	Player	Class	Date of birth (age)
1	Shao Shuai	B1	7 January 1987 (aged 29)
2	Cai Changgui	B1	15 April 1983 (aged 33)
3	Yang Mingyuan	B2	13 January 1998 (aged 18)
4	Chen Liangliang	B1	28 September 1984 (aged 31)
5	Hu Mingyao	B2	14 January 1995 (aged 21)
6	Yu Qinquan	B1	19 April 1996 (aged 20)

==== Group B ====
Pos	Team	Pld	W	D	L	GF	GA	GD	Pts	Qualification
1	Lithuania	4	4	0	0	35	22	+13	12	Quarter-finals
2	United States	4	2	0	2	21	18	+3	6	Quarter-finals
3	Turkey	4	2	0	2	20	23	−3	6	Quarter-finals
4	China	4	1	0	3	25	28	−3	3	Quarter-finals
5	Finland	4	1	0	3	24	34	−10	3	

Source: Paralympic.org

9 September 2016; 09:00	United States	5–2	China	Future Arena, Rio de Janeiro; Referees: Rudi Janssen (BEL), Raquel Aguado (ESP)
9 September 2016; 09:00	Hamilton 3 Kusku 2	Report	Cai 2	Future Arena, Rio de Janeiro; Referees: Rudi Janssen (BEL), Raquel Aguado (ESP)

11 September 2016; 13:15	China	10–3	Turkey	Future Arena, Rio de Janeiro; Referees: Vilma Basinkaite (LTU), Patricia Fras (SLO)
11 September 2016; 13:15	Chen 4 Cai 4 Hu 1 Shao 1	Report	Karakaya 2 Gündoğdu 1	Future Arena, Rio de Janeiro; Referees: Vilma Basinkaite (LTU), Patricia Fras (SLO)

12 September 2016; 14:15	Lithuania	3–1	China	Future Arena, Rio de Janeiro; Referees: Patricia Fras (SLO), Joelle Boulet (CAN)
12 September 2016; 14:15	Pavliukianec 2 Pazarauskas 1	Report	Chen 1	Future Arena, Rio de Janeiro; Referees: Patricia Fras (SLO), Joelle Boulet (CAN)

13 September 2016; 18:15	China	7–11	Finland	Future Arena, Rio de Janeiro; Referees: Joelle Boulet (CAN), Alexander Knecht (GER)
13 September 2016; 18:15	Yang 4 Chen 1 Hu 1 Cai 1	Report	Mattila 6 Miinala 5	Future Arena, Rio de Janeiro; Referees: Joelle Boulet (CAN), Alexander Knecht (GER)

==== Quarter-finals ====
14 September 2016; 09:00	Brazil	10–3	China	Future Arena, Rio de Janeiro; Referees: Yoshinori Nii (JPN), Rudi Janssen (BEL)
14 September 2016; 09:00	Moreno 8 Sousa 2	Report	Shao 2 Yang 1	Future Arena, Rio de Janeiro; Referees: Yoshinori Nii (JPN), Rudi Janssen (BEL)

=== Women ===
China's women enter the tournament ranked 1st in the world.

==== Rosters ====
The following is the China roster in the women's goalball tournament of the 2016 Summer Paralympics.

No.	Player	Class	Date of birth (age)
1	Chen Fengqing	B1	17 July 1985 (aged 31)
2	Ju Zhen	B2	10 May 1989 (aged 27)
3	Zhang Wei	B1	22 December 1989 (aged 26)
4	Zhao Kaimei	B2	10 November 1987 (aged 28)
5	Zhang Huiwen	B1	12 June 1993 (aged 23)
6	Sun Le	B1	17 August 1993 (aged 23)

==== Group D ====
Pos	Team	Pld	W	D	L	GF	GA	GD	Pts	Qualification
1	Turkey	4	4	0	0	37	11	+26	12	Quarter-finals
2	China	4	3	0	1	21	14	+7	9	Quarter-finals
3	Canada	4	2	0	2	16	22	−6	6	Quarter-finals
4	Ukraine	4	0	1	3	9	17	−8	1	Quarter-finals
5	Australia	4	0	1	3	6	25	−19	1	

Source: Paralympic.org

8 September 2016; 18:45	Australia	2–5	China	Future Arena, Rio de Janeiro; Referees: Vilma Basinkaite (LTU), Yoshinori Nii (JPN)
8 September 2016; 18:45	Horsburgh 1 Esdaile 1	Report	Zhang W. 4 Chen 1	Future Arena, Rio de Janeiro; Referees: Vilma Basinkaite (LTU), Yoshinori Nii (JPN)

10 September 2016; 14:30	China	2–7	Turkey	Future Arena, Rio de Janeiro; Referees: Dawna Christy (CAN), Nejc Jakic (SLO)
10 September 2016; 14:30	Zhang W. 1 Ju 1	Report	Altunoluk 7	Future Arena, Rio de Janeiro; Referees: Dawna Christy (CAN), Nejc Jakic (SLO)

12 September 2016; 18:15	China	8–3	Canada	Future Arena, Rio de Janeiro; Referees: Vilma Basinkaite (LTU), Yoshinori Nii (JPN)
12 September 2016; 18:15	Zhang W. 7 Ju 1	Report	Andrews 2 Morin 1	Future Arena, Rio de Janeiro; Referees: Vilma Basinkaite (LTU), Yoshinori Nii (JPN)

13 September 2016; 19:30	Ukraine	2–6	China	Future Arena, Rio de Janeiro; Referees: Bülent Kimyon (TUR), Vilma Basinkaite (LTU)
13 September 2016; 19:30	Rud 1 Miroshnyk 1	Report	Zhang W. 3 Chen 3	Future Arena, Rio de Janeiro; Referees: Bülent Kimyon (TUR), Vilma Basinkaite (LTU)

==== Quarter-finals ====
14 September 2016; 14:15	China	5–3	Japan	Future Arena, Rio de Janeiro; Referees: Joelle Boulet (CAN), Nejc Jakic (SLO)
14 September 2016; 14:15	Zhang W. 2 Chen 1 Zhang H. 1 Ju 1	Report	Kakehata 1 Adachi 1 Komiya 1	Future Arena, Rio de Janeiro; Referees: Joelle Boulet (CAN), Nejc Jakic (SLO)

==== Semi-finals ====
15 September 2016; 15:00	Brazil	3–4	China	Future Arena, Rio de Janeiro; Referees: Dawna Christy (CAN), Alexander Knecht (GER)
15 September 2016; 15:00	Custodio 2 Amorim 1	Report	Chen 3 Zhang W. 1	Future Arena, Rio de Janeiro; Referees: Dawna Christy (CAN), Alexander Knecht (GER)

==== Gold-medal match ====
16 September 2016; 18:30	China	1–4	Turkey	Future Arena, Rio de Janeiro; Referees: Vilma Basinkaite (LTU), Raili Sipura (FIN)
16 September 2016; 18:30	Chen 1	Report	Altunoluk 3 Yıldız 1	Future Arena, Rio de Janeiro; Referees: Vilma Basinkaite (LTU), Raili Sipura (FIN)

== Judo ==
With one pathway for qualification being having a top finish at the 2014 IBSA Judo World Championships, China earned a qualifying spot in Rio base on the performance of Liqing Li in the women's -48 kg event. The B2 Judoka finished first in her class. Yanping Yuan earned China a second spot with her gold medal in the women's +70 kg event.

Athlete	Event	Quarterfinals	Semifinals	First Repechage Round	Final/BM	
Athlete	Event	Opposition Result	Opposition Result	Opposition Result	Opposition Result	Rank
Li Liqing	Women's 48 kg	Hangai Shizuka (JPN); W 100-0s1	Lee Kai-Lin (TPE); W 000-0s1	Bye	Carmen Brussig (GER); W 102-000	1st place, gold medalist(s)
Wang Lijing	Women's 57 kg	Lucia da Silva (BRA); L 0s3-000	Did Not Advance	Sabina Abdullayeva (AZE); W 100-000	Seo Hana (KOR); L 000-1s1	=5
Zhou Tong	Women's 63 kg	Tursunpashsha Nurmetova (UZB); L 000-110	Did Not Advance	Yoneda Mayumi (JPN); W 110-0s1	Jin Songlee (KOR); L 000-100	=5
Zhou Qian	Women's 70 kg	Naomi Soazo (VEN); L 0s1-100	Did Not Advance	Gulruh Rahimova (UZB); L 000-100	Did Not Advance	=7
Yuan Yanping	Women's +70 kg	Mesme Tasbag (TUR); W 111-000	Deanne Silva de Almeida (BRA); W 100-000	Bye	Khayitjon Alimova (UZB); W 101-000	1st place, gold medalist(s)

== Paracanoeing ==
China earned a qualifying spot at the 2016 Summer Paralympics in this sport following their performance at the 2015 ICF Canoe Sprint & Paracanoe World Championships in Milan, Italy where the top six finishers in each Paralympic event earned a qualifying spot for their nation. Danqin Wang earned the spot for China after finishing seventh in the women's KL2 event because Great Britain had two people in the top six but could only get one slot.

Athlete	Event	Heats		Semi Final		Final	
Athlete	Event	Time	Rank	Time	Rank	Time	Rank
Yu Xiaowei	Men's KL1	54.524	3 SF	54.630	2 FA	53.008	7
Wang Danqin	Women's KL2	59.987	2 FA	Bye		59.587	6

== Powerlifting ==
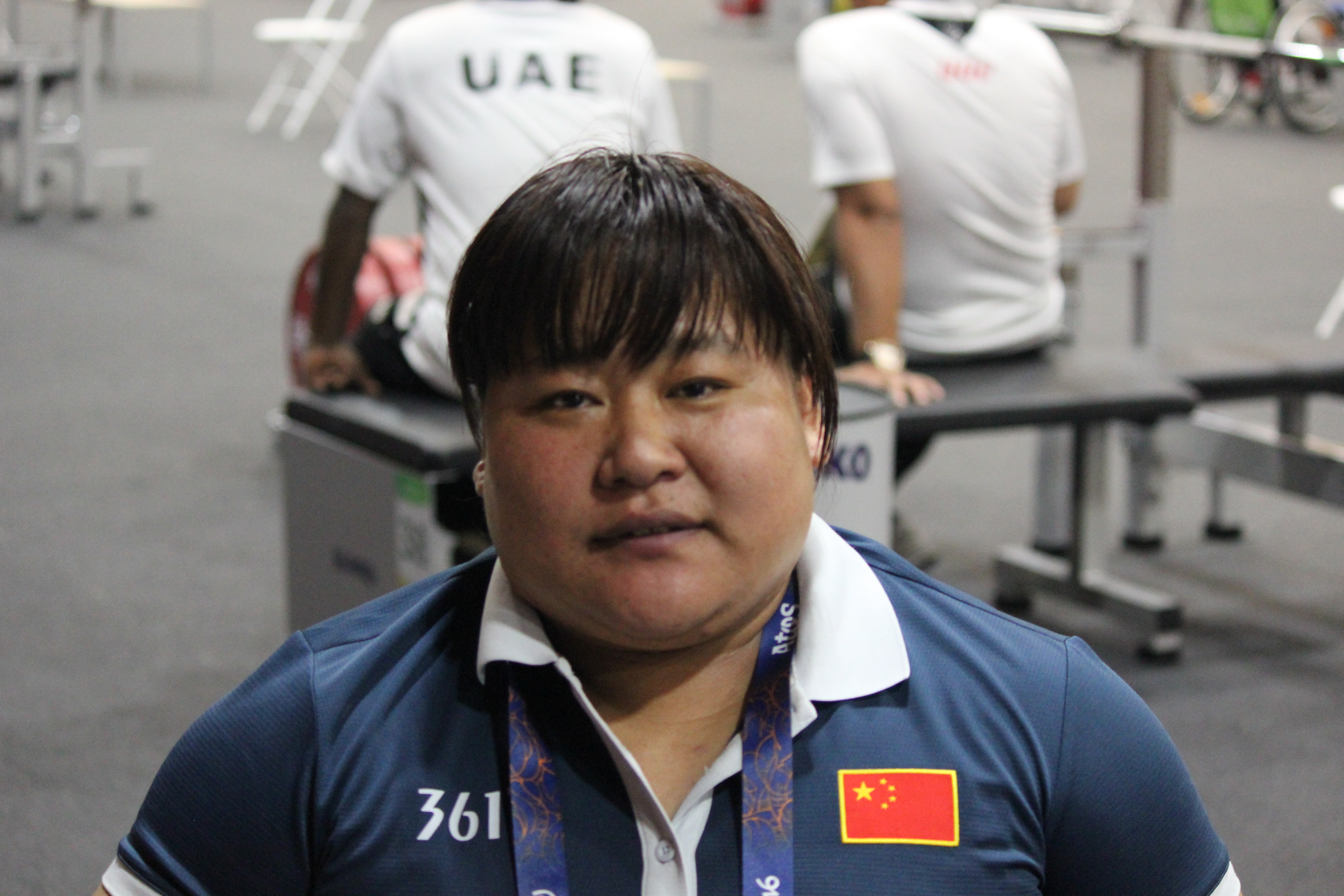
Xu Lili of China in Rio

China is competing at powerlifting in Rio.

Men

Athlete	Event	Result	Rank
Wang Jian	-54kg	170	2nd place, silver medalist(s)
Yang Quanxi	-59kg	176	3rd place, bronze medalist(s)
Hu Peng	-65kg	200	2nd place, silver medalist(s)
Liu Lei	-72kg	221	1st place, gold medalist(s)
Gu Xiaofei	-80kg	228	2nd place, silver medalist(s)
Ye Jixiong	-88kg	DNF	
Qi Dong	-97kg	233	2nd place, silver medalist(s)
Cai Huichao	-107kg	215	4

Women

Athlete	Event	Result	Rank
Cui Zhe	-41kg	102	2nd place, silver medalist(s)
Hu Dandan	-45kg	107 WR	1st place, gold medalist(s)
Shi Shanshan	-50kg	100	4
Xiao Cuijuan	-55kg	115	3rd place, bronze medalist(s)
Yang Yan	-61kg	128	3rd place, bronze medalist(s)
Tan Yujiao	-67kg	135 WR	1st place, gold medalist(s)
Xu Lili	-79kg	135	2nd place, silver medalist(s)
Li Fengmei	-86kg	116	4

== Rowing ==
Athlete	Event	Heats		Repechage		Final	
Athlete	Event	Time	Rank	Time	Rank	Time	Rank
Huang Cheng	Men's single sculls	4:59.61	2 R	4:59.50	1 FA	4:54.43	5
Wang Lili	Women's single sculls	5:21.04	1 FA	Bye		5:16.65	2nd place, silver medalist(s)
Fei Tianming; Liu Shuang	Mixed Double Sculls	3:54.70	2 R	4:01.00	1 FA	3:58.45	2nd place, silver medalist(s)
Wang Qian; Zhao Hui; Chen Xinxin; Wu Yunlong; Yu Li (Cox)	Mixed Coxed Four	3:29.66	2 R	3:36.38	2 FA	3:31.12	6

== Sitting volleyball ==
=== Men ===
China men's national sitting volleyball team qualified for the 2016 Summer Paralympics at the 2014 Asian Para Games, winning the gold-medal match in sets of 25-12, 25-20, 29-27 against the Iran men's national sitting volleyball team.

==== Rosters ====
Name	Date of birth
Ding Xiaochao	1987-07-13
Gao Hui	1987-09-17
Jin Heng	1982-02-04
Li Ji	1985-08-12
Li Lei	1991-03-23
Li Mingfa	1984-12-17
Wang Shuo	1987-12-11
Xu Zengbing	1996-08-29
Zhang Lianglin	1995-10-08
Zhang Zhongmin	1978-08-25
Zou Canming	1982-03-03
Zhu Kebo	1983-09-16

==== Group B ====
Pos	Team	Pld	W	L	Pts	SW	SL	SR	SPW	SPL	SPR	Qualification
1	Iran	3	3	0	6	9	0	MAX	228	173	1.318	Semi-finals
2	Bosnia and Herzegovina	3	2	1	5	6	3	2.000	206	184	1.120	Semi-finals
3	Ukraine	3	1	2	4	3	8	0.375	237	265	0.894	Classification 5th / 6th
4	China	3	0	3	3	2	9	0.222	216	265	0.815	Classification 7th / 8th

Source: Paralympic.org

10 September 2016; 10:00	Iran	3–0	China	Riocentro - Pavilion 6, Rio de Janeiro
10 September 2016; 10:00	(25–22, 25–13, 25–14); Report			Riocentro - Pavilion 6, Rio de Janeiro

12 September 2016; 14:00	China	2–3	Ukraine	Riocentro - Pavilion 6, Rio de Janeiro
12 September 2016; 14:00	(28–26, 25–23, 23–25, 22–25, 14–16); Report			Riocentro - Pavilion 6, Rio de Janeiro

14 September 2016; 18:30	Bosnia and Herzegovina	3–0	China	Riocentro - Pavilion 6, Rio de Janeiro
14 September 2016; 18:30	(25–14, 25–22, 25–19); Report			Riocentro - Pavilion 6, Rio de Janeiro

==== Classification 7th / 8th ====
16 September 2016; 13:30	United States	0–3	China	Riocentro - Pavilion 6, Rio de Janeiro
16 September 2016; 13:30	(15–25, 16–25, 17–25); Report			Riocentro - Pavilion 6, Rio de Janeiro

=== Women ===
China women's national sitting volleyball team qualified to compete at the 2016 Games after finishing first at the 2014 World Championships. Later that year, the team competed in the 2014 Asian Para Games where they lost to Iran women's national sitting volleyball team in the final with sets of 25-15, 25-12, and 25-15 in Iran's favor.

==== Rosters ====
Name	Date of birth
Gong Bin	1981-02-02
Jiang Jixiu	1979-07-16
Li Liping	1982-07-03
Li Ting	1989-10-25
Lyu Hongqin	1980-10-04
Sheng Yuhong	1971-03-21
Su Limei	1988-10-16
Wang Yanan	1991-09-08
Zhang Lijun	1985-08-31
Zhang Yufei	1984-08-28
Zhao Meiling	1987-03-16
Zhu Kebo	1983-09-16
Li Mingfa	1984-12-17

==== Group B ====
Pos	Team	Pld	W	L	Pts	SW	SL	SR	SPW	SPL	SPR	Qualification
1	China	3	3	0	6	9	2	4.500	246	169	1.456	Semi-finals
2	United States	3	2	1	5	8	3	2.667	256	156	1.641	Semi-finals
3	Iran	3	1	2	4	3	6	0.500	160	197	0.812	Classification 5th / 6th
4	Rwanda	3	0	3	3	0	9	0.000	85	225	0.378	Classification 7th / 8th

Source: Paralympic.org

10 September 2016; 10:00	China	3-0	Rwanda	Riocentro - Pavilion 6, Rio de Janeiro
10 September 2016; 10:00	(25–3, 25–8, 25–6); Report			Riocentro - Pavilion 6, Rio de Janeiro

12 September 2016; 18:30	China	3–2	United States	Riocentro - Pavilion 6, Rio de Janeiro
12 September 2016; 18:30	(25–17, 14–25, 14–25, 28–26, 15–13); Report			Riocentro - Pavilion 6, Rio de Janeiro

14 September 2016; 14:00	Iran	0–3	China	Riocentro - Pavilion 6, Rio de Janeiro
14 September 2016; 14:00	(16–25, 19–25, 11–25); Report			Riocentro - Pavilion 6, Rio de Janeiro

==== Semi-finals ====
15 September 2016; 18:30	Ukraine	0–3	China	Riocentro - Pavilion 6, Rio de Janeiro
15 September 2016; 18:30	(14–25, 23–25, 20–25); Report			Riocentro - Pavilion 6, Rio de Janeiro

==== Final ====
17 September 2016; 16:30	United States	3–0	China	Riocentro - Pavilion 6, Rio de Janeiro
17 September 2016; 16:30	(25–12, 25–12, 25–18); Report			Riocentro - Pavilion 6, Rio de Janeiro

== Shooting ==
The first opportunity to qualify for shooting at the Rio Games took place at the 2014 IPC Shooting World Championships in Suhl. Shooters earned spots for their NPC. China earned a qualifying spot at this event in the R8 – 50m rifle 3 positions women SH1 event as a result of Cuiping Zhang winning a gold medal. China qualified a pair of shooters in the P3 – 25m Pistol Mixed SH1 event based on the performances of Jianfei Li and Hedong Ni. Cuiping Zhang grabbed the fourth qualifying spot for China at this competition in the R6 – 50m Rifle Prone Mixed SH1 event.

The country sent shooters to 2015 IPC IPC Shooting World Cup in Osijek, Croatia, where Rio direct qualification was also available. They earned a qualifying spot at this event based on the performance of Yaping Yan in the R3 – 10m Air Rifle Prone Mixed SH1 event. Chao Yang earned China a second spot at the event in the P1 – 10m Air Pistol Men SH1 event. Xing Huang's performance gave China its third and final qualifying spot at this competition with his finish in the P3 – 25m Pistol Mixed SH1.

The third opportunity for direct qualification for shooters to the Rio Paralympics took place at the 2015 IPC IPC Shooting World Cup in Sydney, Australia. At this competition, Dingchao Gou earned a qualifying spot for their country in the R1 - Men's 10m Air Rifle Standing SH1 event. Xiao Hong Bai earned a second spot for China at this event based on her performance in the R2 - Women's 10m Air Rifle Standing SH1 event. Huan He had China's third spot earned for Rio at this competition with her performance in the R3 - Mixed 10m Air Rifle Prone SH1 event. Hongxiang Yuan grabbed a fourth spot for China in the R4- Mixed 10m Air Rifle Standing SH2 event.

Men

Athlete	Event	Qualification		Final	
Athlete	Event	Score	Rank	Score	Rank
Dong Chao	10 m air rifle standing SH1	618.6	5 Q	205.8	1st place, gold medalist(s)
Gou Dingchao	10 m air rifle standing SH1	617.2	8 Q	79.9	8
Huang Xing	10 m air pistol standing SH1	559	11	Did Not Advance	
Li Jianfei	10 m air pistol standing SH1	554	21	Did Not Advance	
Yang Chao	10 m air pistol standing SH1	571	1 Q	198.2	1st place, gold medalist(s)
Dong Chao	50 m rifle 3 positions SH1	1154	3 Q	404.7	6
Gou Dingchao	50 m rifle 3 positions SH1	1148	8 Q	392.5	8

Women

Athlete	Event	Qualification		Final	
Athlete	Event	Score	Rank	Score	Rank
Zhang Cuiping	10 m air rifle standing SH1	413.4	1 Q	206.3	2nd place, silver medalist(s)
Yan Yaping	10 m air rifle standing SH1	409.7	4 Q	183.6	3rd place, bronze medalist(s)
Bai Xiaohong	10 m air rifle standing SH1	409.4	5 Q	98.1	7
Bai Xiaohong	10 m air pistol standing SH1	361	11	Did Not Advance	
Zhang Cuiping	50 m rifle 3 positions SH1	583	1 Q	455.4	1st place, gold medalist(s)
Yan Yaping	50 m rifle 3 positions SH1	576	3 Q	401.6	6
Bai Xiaohong	50 m rifle 3 positions SH1	551	10	Did Not Advance	

Mixed

Athlete	Event	Qualification		Semifinal		Final/BM	
Athlete	Event	Score	Rank	Score	Rank	Score	Rank
Bai Xiaohong	10 m air rifle prone SH1	629.7	19	—N/a		Did Not Advance	
Dong Chao	10 m air rifle prone SH1	632.3	9	—N/a		Did Not Advance	
Zhang Cuiping	10 m air rifle prone SH1	634.7	2 Q	—N/a		147.2	5
Yuan Hongxiang	10 m air rifle standing SH2	629.7	10	—N/a		Did Not Advance	
Yuan Hongxiang	10 m air rifle prone SH2	633.1	11	—N/a		Did Not Advance	
Huang Xing	25m pistol SH1	584	1 Q	11	2 QG	Joackim Norberg (SWE); W 7-5	1st place, gold medalist(s)
Li Jianfei	25m pistol SH1	549	19	Did Not Advance			
Yang Chao	25m pistol SH1	564	9	Did Not Advance			
Yan Yaping	50 m rifle prone SH1	607.1	26	—N/a		Did Not Advance	
Dong Chao	50 m rifle prone SH1	609.5	23	—N/a		Did Not Advance	
Zhang Cuiping	50 m rifle prone SH1	617.7	5 Q	—N/a		206.8	1st place, gold medalist(s)
Li Jianfei	50 m pistol SH1	514	22	—N/a		Did Not Advance	
Huang Xing	50 m pistol SH1	520	17	—N/a		Did Not Advance	
Yang Chao	50 m pistol SH1	546	1 Q	—N/a		186.5	2nd place, silver medalist(s)

== Swimming ==
The top two finishers in each Rio medal event at the 2015 IPC Swimming World Championships earned a qualifying spot for their country for Rio. Shiyun Pan earned China a spot after winning gold in the Men's 100m Freestyle S7.

=== Men ===
Athletes	Event	Heat		Final	
Athletes	Event	Time	Rank	Time	Rank
Du Jianping	50 m freestyle S3	46.95	3 Q	45.62	4
Huang Wenpan	50 m freestyle S3	40.51 WR	1 Q	39.24 WR	1st place, gold medalist(s)
Li Hanhua	50 m freestyle S3	50.55	2 Q	42.18	3rd place, bronze medalist(s)
He Shiwei	50 m freestyle S5	35.41	3 Q	35.60	6
Jia Hongguang	50 m freestyle S6	29.66	1 Q	29.87	3rd place, bronze medalist(s)
Xu Qing	50 m freestyle S6	30.82	1 Q	28.81	1st place, gold medalist(s)
Zheng Tao	50 m freestyle S6	32.05	3	Did Not Advance	
Pan Shiyun	50 m freestyle S7	29.81	4 Q	27.35 WR	1st place, gold medalist(s)
Wang Jingang	50 m freestyle S7	28.89	1 Q	29.50	5
Wang Yinan	50 m freestyle S8	26.80	1 Q	26.24	1st place, gold medalist(s)
Song Maodang	50 m freestyle S8	27.79	3 Q	27.25	5
Yang Guanglong	50 m freestyle S8	27.65	3 Q	27.43	7
Lin Furong	50 m freestyle S10	25.36	3	Did Not Advance	
Yang Bozun	50 m freestyle S11	26.36	1 Q	26.72	2nd place, silver medalist(s)
Lou Chenquan	50 m freestyle S11	27.63	5	Did Not Advance	
Jin Zhipeng	100 m freestyle S4	1:26.77	1 Q	1.26.05	2nd place, silver medalist(s)
Jia Hongguang	100 m freestyle S6	1:08.38	2 Q	1:06.28	4
Xu Qing	100 m freestyle S6	1:10.36	2	Did Not Advance	
Luo Jinbiao	100 m freestyle S6	1:10.55	4	Did Not Advance	
Pan Shiyun	100 m freestyle S7	1:04.51	2 Q	1:00.82	1st place, gold medalist(s)
Wang Jingang	100 m freestyle S7	1:07.40	5	Did Not Advance	
Song Maodang	100 m freestyle S8	59.68	2 Q	58.13	2nd place, silver medalist(s)
Wang Yinan	100 m freestyle S8	59.03	1 Q	56.80	1st place, gold medalist(s)
Yang Guanglong	100 m freestyle S8	59.33	2 Q	59.17	5
Yang Bozun	100 m freestyle S11	59.74	2 Q	59.51	2nd place, silver medalist(s)
Liu Benying	200 m freestyle S2	4:00.02	1 Q	3:41.54 WR	1st place, gold medalist(s)
Yang Yang	200 m freestyle S2	4:13.42	2 Q	4:11.20	4
Zou Liankang	200 m freestyle S2	3:49.37 WR	1 Q	3:42.58	2nd place, silver medalist(s)
Huang Chaowen	200 m freestyle S3	—N/a		3:39.41	5
Huang Wenpan	200 m freestyle S3	—N/a		3:09.04 WR	1st place, gold medalist(s)
Li Hanhua	200 m freestyle S3	—N/a		3:23.10	3rd place, bronze medalist(s)
Jin Zhipeng	200 m freestyle S4	3:13.42	4 Q	3:03.94	3rd place, bronze medalist(s)
Liu Yuntao	200 m freestyle S4	3:42.10	5	Did Not Advance	
Li Junsheng	200 m freestyle S5	3:03.55	5	Did Not Advance	
Luo Jinbiao	400 m freestyle S6	5:20.77	2 Q	5:21.34	5
Yang Hong	400 m freestyle S6	5:44.82	4 Q	5:33.71	8
Wang Yinan	400 m freestyle S8	4:41.10	1 Q	4:32.78	3rd place, bronze medalist(s)
Xu Haijiao	400 m freestyle S8	4:41.18	2 Q	4:25.65	2nd place, silver medalist(s)
Liu Benying	50 m backstroke S2	52.14	1 Q	48.84	2nd place, silver medalist(s)
Yang Yang	50 m backstroke S2	58.63	1 Q	57.27	4
Zou Liankang	50 m backstroke S2	54.36	2 Q	47.17 WR	1st place, gold medalist(s)
Du Jianping	50 m backstroke S3	47.35	2 Q	47.02	4
Huang Wenpan	50 m backstroke S3	49.24	3 Q	46.11	2nd place, silver medalist(s)
Li Hanhua	50 m backstroke S3	55.29	3 Q	51.48	5
Liu Yuntao	50 m backstroke S4	44.42	2 Q	45.01	2nd place, silver medalist(s)
Liu Benying	100 m backstroke S2	1:50.67 WR	1 Q	1:48.29	2nd place, silver medalist(s)
Yang Yang	100 m backstroke S2	2:02.34	3 Q	2:00.06	4
Zou Liankang	100 m backstroke S2	1:58.29 WR	1 Q	1:45.25 WR	1st place, gold medalist(s)
Jia Hongguang	100 m backstroke S6	1:12.27 WR	1 Q	1:13.42	2nd place, silver medalist(s)
Luo Fangyu	100 m backstroke S6	1:21.56	4 Q	1:20.54	6
Zheng Tao	100 m backstroke S6	1:13.59	1 Q	1:10.84 WR	1st place, gold medalist(s)
Gao Nan	100 m backstroke S7	1:15.70	4 Q	1:15.67	6
Zhou Cong	100 m backstroke S8	1:07.72	3 Q	1:02.90 WR	1st place, gold medalist(s)
Liu Xiaobing	100 m backstroke S9	1:05.13	2 Q	1:04.46	2nd place, silver medalist(s)
Lou Chenquan	100 m backstroke S11	1:11.64	4 Q	1:12.20	7
Yang Bozun	100 m backstroke S11	1:10.40	2 Q	1:09.89	6
Li Tingshen	50 m breaststroke SB2	55.16	1 Q	51.78	2nd place, silver medalist(s)
Huang Wenpan	50 m breaststroke SB2	52.48 WR	1 Q	50.65 WR	1st place, gold medalist(s)
Huang Chaowen	50 m breaststroke SB2	55.74	2 Q	54.29	3rd place, bronze medalist(s)
Jin Zhipeng	50 m breaststroke SB3	49.52	1 Q	47.54 WR	1st place, gold medalist(s)
Li Junsheng	100 m breaststroke SB4	—N/a		1:35.96	1st place, gold medalist(s)
He Shiwei	100 m breaststroke SB4	—N/a		DSQ	
Di Yingbin	50 m breaststroke SB6	1:29.70	3 Q	1:27.43	6
Chen Jianfeng	100 m breaststroke SB7	1:22.45	3 Q	1:21.37	5
Yang Hong	100 m breaststroke SB7	1:21.27	2 Q	1:20.21	3rd place, bronze medalist(s)
Zhao Xueming	100 m breaststroke SB8	—N/a		1:15.35	6
Xu Haijiao	100 m breaststroke SB8	—N/a		1:27.56	7
Lin Furong	100 m breaststroke SB9	1:09.34	4 Q	1:07.12	4
Yang Bozun	100 m breaststroke SB11	1:15.17	2 Q	1:10.06 WR	1st place, gold medalist(s)
He Shiwei	50 m butterfly S5	35.74	1 Q	35.25	2nd place, silver medalist(s)
Wang Lichao	50 m butterfly S6	31.74	3 Q	30.95	3rd place, bronze medalist(s)
Xu Qing	50 m butterfly S6	30.89	1 Q	29.89 WR	1st place, gold medalist(s)
Zheng Tao	50 m butterfly S6	31.25	2 Q	29.93	2nd place, silver medalist(s)
Pan Shiyun	50 m butterfly S7	31.85	3 Q	28.41 WR	1st place, gold medalist(s)
Wang Jingang	50 m butterfly S7	31.61	1 Q	30.07	3rd place, bronze medalist(s)
Song Maodang	100 m butterfly S8	1:01.56	2 Q	59.19 WR	1st place, gold medalist(s)
Xu Haijiao	100 m butterfly S8	1:01.01	1 Q	1:00.08	2nd place, silver medalist(s)
Yang Guanglong	100 m butterfly S8	1:01.02	1 Q	1:01.18	3rd place, bronze medalist(s)
Lou Chenquan	100 m butterfly S11	—N/a		1:06.99	5
Du Jianping	150 m Individual Medley SM3	2:59.45	2 Q	2:52.32	3rd place, bronze medalist(s)
Li Tingshen	150 m Individual Medley SM3	2:58.54	1 Q	2:55.29	4
Huang Wenpan	150 m Individual Medley SM3	2:59.23	2 Q	2:40.19 WR	1st place, gold medalist(s)
Jin Zhipeng	150 m Individual Medley SM4	2:32.86	2 Q	2:26.91	2nd place, silver medalist(s)
Jia Hongguang	200 m Individual Medley SM6	2:45.45	2 Q	2:39.47	2nd place, silver medalist(s)
Xu Qing	200 m Individual Medley SM6	2:53.88	3 Q	2:42.57	4
Yang Hong	200 m Individual Medley SM6	2:43.19	2 Q	2:42.92	5
Wang Jingang	200 m Individual Medley SM7	2:49.56	3 Q	2:38.30	5
Yang Guanglong	200 m Individual Medley SM8	2:32.77	3 Q	2:27.87	5
Song Maodang	200 m Individual Medley SM8	2:28.21	1 Q	2:20.79	2nd place, silver medalist(s)
Xu Haijiao	200 m Individual Medley SM8	2:28.88	2 Q	2:21.19	3rd place, bronze medalist(s)
Yang Bozun	200 m Individual Medley SM11	2:35.11	2 Q	2:27.82	2nd place, silver medalist(s)
Lou Chenquan	200 m Individual Medley SM11	2:34.66	1 Q	2:32.42	6
Song Maodang; Xu Haijiao; Lin Furong; Wang Yinan	4 × 100 m freestyle relay-34 Points	—N/a		3:50.41	3rd place, bronze medalist(s)
Zhou Cong; Lin Furong; Song Maodang; Wang Yinan	4 × 100 m medley relay-34 Points	—N/a		4:06.44	1st place, gold medalist(s)

=== Women ===
Athletes	Event	Heat		Final	
Athletes	Event	Time	Rank	Time	Rank
Cheng Jiao	50 m freestyle S4	44.62	3 Q	43.13	5
Deng Yue	50 m freestyle S4	48.50	5	Did Not Advance	
Zhang Li	50 m freestyle S5	37.37	2 Q	36.87	1st place, gold medalist(s)
Yao Cuan	50 m freestyle S5	41.87	5	Did Not Advance	
Xu Xihan	50 m freestyle S5	44.12	6	Did Not Advance	
Song Lingling	50 m freestyle S6	35.41	3 Q	35.25	5
Huang Yajing	50 m freestyle S7	34.50	3 Q	34.12	6
Ke Liting	50 m freestyle S7	34.81	4 Q	35.62	8
Jiang Shengnan	50 m freestyle S8	30.89	2 Q	30.53	3rd place, bronze medalist(s)
Jin Xiaoqin	50 m freestyle S8	31.70	4 Q	32.09	8
Lin Ping	50 m freestyle S9	29.26	2 Q	29.62	6
Wang Jiexin	50 m freestyle S9	29.55	1 Q	29.30	3rd place, bronze medalist(s)
Chen Yi	50 m freestyle S10	28.20	2 Q	28.21	3rd place, bronze medalist(s)
Zhang Meng	50 m freestyle S10	29.29	3	Did Not Advance	
Cai Liwen	50 m freestyle S11	32.86 (swim-off 32.20)	3 q	32.31	8
Li Guizhi	50 m freestyle S11	30.89	1 Q	30.73 WR	1st place, gold medalist(s)
Xie Qing	50 m freestyle S11	31.95	3 Q	32.00	7
Meng Guofen	100 m freestyle S3	1:45.11	4 Q	1:42.64	5
Peng Qiuping	100 m freestyle S3	1:39.16	2 Q	1:34.17	2nd place, silver medalist(s)
Zhang Li	100 m freestyle S5	1:22.83	1 Q	1:18.85	1st place, gold medalist(s)
Xu Xihan	100 m freestyle S5	1:40.88	7	Did Not Advance	
Yao Cuan	100 m freestyle S5	1:24.44	3 Q	1:23.99	4
Song Lingling	100 m freestyle S6	1:18.50	2 Q	1:14.46	4
Huang Yajing	100 m freestyle S7	1:13.50	2 Q	1:12.85	3rd place, bronze medalist(s)
Ke Liting	100 m freestyle S7	1:15.15	3 Q	1:16.26	7
Lin Ping	100 m freestyle S9	1:05.08	2 Q	1:06.18	8
Wang Jiexin	100 m freestyle S9	1:05.23	5	Did Not Advance	
Xu Jialing	100 m freestyle S9	1:04.74	2 Q	1:04.32	5
Chen Yi	100 m freestyle S10	1:02.79	2 Q	1:01.76	4
Li Guizhi	100 m freestyle S11	1:09.22	2 Q	1:08.31	2nd place, silver medalist(s)
Xie Qing	100 m freestyle S11	1:10.73	2 Q	1:08.03	1st place, gold medalist(s)
Yao Cuan	200 m freestyle S5	3:04.17	2 Q	3:00.93	4
Zhang Li	200 m freestyle S5	2:55.67	2 Q	2:48.33	1st place, gold medalist(s)
Song Lingling	400 m freestyle S6	5:35.43	2 Q	5:21.37	2nd place, silver medalist(s)
Huang Yajing	400 m freestyle S7	—N/a		5:44.72	6
Xu Jialing	400 m freestyle S9	4:51.19	2 Q	4:43.66	3rd place, bronze medalist(s)
Cai Liwen	400 m freestyle S11	5:43.41	3 Q	5:35.82	6
Li Guizhi	400 m freestyle S11	5:42.18	4 Q	5:52.79	8
Xie Qing	400 m freestyle S11	5:34.81	3 Q	5:25.14	3rd place, bronze medalist(s)
Feng Yazhu	50 m backstroke S2	—N/a		1:02.66	2nd place, silver medalist(s)
Meng Guofen	50 m backstroke S3	52.64	1 Q	51.42	2nd place, silver medalist(s)
Peng Qiuping	50 m backstroke S3	49.91 WR	1 Q	48.49 WR	1st place, gold medalist(s)
Deng Yue	50 m backstroke S4	51.94	2 Q	50.01	2nd place, silver medalist(s)
Cheng Jiao	50 m backstroke S4	47.68 WR	1 Q	48.11	1st place, gold medalist(s)
Wu Qi	50 m backstroke S5	52.52	4	Did Not Advance	
Zhang Li	50 m backstroke S5	48.30	2 Q	47.07	4
Lu Dong	100 m backstroke S6	1:26.43	1 Q	1:21.65	2nd place, silver medalist(s)
Song Lingling	100 m backstroke S6	1:24.66 WR	1 Q	1:21.43WR	1st place, gold medalist(s)
Huang Yajing	100 m backstroke S7	1:25.34	3 Q	1:24.53	4
Ke Liting	100 m backstroke S7	1:22.72	1 Q	1:23.06	1st place, gold medalist(s)
Zhang Ying	100 m backstroke S7	1:24.97	2 Q	1:23.34	2nd place, silver medalist(s)
Lu Weiyuan	100 m backstroke S8	1:22.47	3 Q	1:22.17	7
Jin Xiaoqin	100 m backstroke S8	1:26.65	5	Did Not Advance	
Wang Jiexin	100 m backstroke S9	1:14.14	2 Q	1:13.54	4
Xu Jialing	100 m backstroke S9	1:18.74	3	Did Not Advance	
Cai Liwen	100 m backstroke S11	1:20.59	1 Q	1:20.29	2nd place, silver medalist(s)
Li Guizhi	100 m backstroke S11	1:23.34	4 Q	1:22.97	6
Peng Qiuping	50 m breaststroke SB3	1:13.95	6	Did Not Advance	
Deng Yue	50 m breaststroke SB3	1:07.32	3 Q	1:08.49	7
Cheng Jiao	50 m breaststroke SB3	59.87	1 Q	58.28	1st place, gold medalist(s)
Wu Qi	100 m breaststroke SB4	2:11.18	4	Did Not Advance	
Yao Cuan	100 m breaststroke SB4	2:05.00	4 Q	2:07.64	8
Zhang Li	100 m breaststroke SB4	2:02.84	3 Q	1:58.13	4
Xu Jialing	100 m breaststroke SB8	1:32.48	4 Q	1:30.47	6
Zhang Meng	100 m breaststroke SB9	1:20.84	1 Q	1:19.46	5
Zhang Xiaotong	100 m breaststroke SB11	—N/a		1:23.02	1st place, gold medalist(s)
Xu Xihan	50 m butterfly S5	43.90	1 Q	43.62	1st place, gold medalist(s)
Lu Dong	50 m butterfly S6	39.11	3 Q	37.06	4
Jiang Shengnan	100 m butterfly S8	1:28.19	7	Did Not Advance	
Jin Xiaoqin	100 m butterfly S8	1:16.94	3 Q	1:13.52	5
Lu Weiyuan	100 m butterfly S8	1:12.29	2 Q	1:11.68	4
Lin Ping	100 m butterfly S9	1:14.73	4	Did Not Advance	
Xu Jialing	100 m butterfly S9	1:09.43	1 Q	1:07.90	1st place, gold medalist(s)
Wang Jiexin	100 m butterfly S9	1:12.18	4	Did Not Advance	
Chen Yi	100 m butterfly S10	1:08.62	2 Q	1:06.92	2nd place, silver medalist(s)
Cheng Jiao	150 m individual medley SM4	2:47.57 WR	1 Q	2:49.69	1st place, gold medalist(s)
Deng Yue	150 m individual medley SM4	2:58.54	2 Q	2:57.26	3rd place, bronze medalist(s)
Wu Qi	200 m individual medley SM5	3:49.44	4 Q	3:51.08	8
Lu Dong	200 m individual medley SM6	3:15.62	3 Q	3:13.47	5
Song Lingling	200 m individual medley SM6	3:09.93	2 Q	3:03.19	2nd place, silver medalist(s)
Ke Liting	200 m individual medley SM7	DSQ		Did Not Advance	
Zhang Ying	200 m individual medley SM7	3:13.95	3 Q	3:09.28	4
Jiang Shengnan	200 m individual medley SM8	2:54.81	3 Q	2:47.15	4
Lu Weiyuan	200 m individual medley SM8	2:55.25	4 Q	2:50.96	7
Lin Ping	200 m individual medley SM9	2:37.50	1 Q	2:35.64	1st place, gold medalist(s)
Xu Jialing	200 m individual medley SM9	2:39.61	2 Q	2:36.48	4
Chen Yi	200 m individual medley SM10	2:37.33	5 Q	2:33.06	5
Zhang Meng	200 m individual medley SM10	2:36.94	4 Q	2:36.53	8
Xie Qing	200 m individual medley SM11	2:55.75	1 Q	2:51.98	3rd place, bronze medalist(s)
Cai Liwen	200 m individual medley SM11	DSQ		Did Not Advance	
Song Lingling; Chen Yi; Lin Ping; Xu Jialing	4 × 100 m freestyle relay-34 Points	—N/a		4:24.22	3rd place, bronze medalist(s)
Song Lingling; Zhang Meng; Xu Jialing; Chen Yi	4 × 100 m medley relay-34 Points	—N/a		4:53.57	4

=== Mixed ===
Athletes	Event	Heat		Final	
Athletes	Event	Time	Rank	Time	Rank
Peng Qiuping; Jiang Shengnan; Huang Wenpan; Xu Qing; Li Hanhua*; Zhang Li*; Zou Liankang*; Chen Yi*	4x50m freestyle relay-20 Points	2:41.29	3 Q	2:18.03 WR	1st place, gold medalist(s)

Qualifiers for the latter rounds (Q or q) of all events were decided on a time only basis, therefore positions shown are results versus competitors in their own heats.
* – Indicates athlete swam in the heats but not in the final race.

== Table tennis ==
Men's individual

Athlete	Event	Group stage			Round 1	Quarterfinals	Semifinals	Final/BM	
Athlete	Event	Opposition Result	Opposition Result	Rank	Opposition Result	Opposition Result	Opposition Result	Opposition Result	Rank
Gao Yanming	Individual C2	Rafal Czuper (POL); L 0-3	Iranildo Conceicao Espindola (BRA); W 3-2	2 Q	Cha Soo Yong (KOR); W 3-2	Fabien Lamirault (FRA); L 1-3	Did Not Advance		
Feng Panfeng	Individual C3	Yuttajak Glinbancheun (THA); W 3-0	Egon Kramminger (AUT); W 3-0	1 Q	Maciej Nalepka (POL); W 3-0	Jan Guertler (GER); W 3-1	Thomas Bruchle (GER); W 3-1	Thomas Schumidberger (GER); W 3-1	1st place, gold medalist(s)
Zhai Xiang	Individual C3	Welder Knaf (BRA); W 3-2	Victor Sjoqvist (SWE); W 3-0	1 Q	Anurak Laowong (THA); W 3-0	Thomas Bruchle (GER); L 2-3	Did Not Advance		
Zhao Ping	Individual C3	Yoshida Shinichi (JPN); W 3-0	Jan Guertler (GER); W 3-2	1 Q	Yuttajak Glinbancheun (THA); W 3-1	Florian Merrien (FRA); L 0-3	Did Not Advance		
Guo Xingyuan	Individual C4	Abdullah Ozturk (TUR); L 1-3	Shay Siada (ISR); W 3-0	2 Q	Wanchai Chaiwut (THA); W 3-1	Kim Young Gun (KOR); W 3-0	Nesim Turan (TUR); W 3-1	Abdullah Ozturk (TUR); L 1-3	2nd place, silver medalist(s)
Zhang Yan	Individual C4	George Wyndham (SLE); W 3-1	Wanchai Chaiwut (THA); W 3-2	1 Q	Peter Mihalik (SVK); W 3-0	Maxime Thomas (FRA); L 1-3	Did Not Advance		
Cao Ningning	Individual C5	Bilal El Baqqali Talibi (ESP); W 3-1	Kim Kiyoung (KOR); W 3-1	1 Q	Bye	Lin Yen-hung (TPE); W 3-0	Tommy Urhaug (NOR); W 3-0	Valentin Baus (GER); W 3-0	1st place, gold medalist(s)
Liao Keli	Individual C7	Willian Bayley (GBR); L 0-3	Israel Pereira Stroh (BRA); W 3-1	3	Did Not Advance				
Yan Shuo	Individual C7	Miroslav Jambor (SVK); W 3-1	Kevin Dourbecker (FRA); W 3-0	1 Q	Bye	Jean-Paul Montanus (NED); W 3-2	Israel Pereira Stroh (BRA); L 2-3	Jordi Morales Garcia (ESP); W 3-1	3rd place, bronze medalist(s)
Sun Churen	Individual C8	Victor Didukh (UKR); L 1-3	Gyula Zborai (HUN); L 1-3	3	Did Not Advance				
Ye Chaoqun	Individual C8	Barak Mizrachi (AUS); W 3-0	Piotr Grudzien (POL); L 2-3	2 Q	Richard Csejtey (SVK); W 3-2	Victor Didukh (UKR); W 3-0	Csonka Andras (HUN); L 0-3	Piotr Grudzien (POL); L 2-3	4
Zhao Shuai	Individual C8	Mathieu Loicq (BEL); W 3-1	Richard Csejtey (SVK); W 3-0	1 Q	Bye	Emil Andersson (SWE); W 3-0	Piotr Grudzien (POL); W 3-2	Csonka Andras (HUN); W 3-0	1st place, gold medalist(s)
Ma Lin	Individual C9	Berecki Dezso (HUN); W 3-0	Tahl Leibovitz (USA); W 3-0	1 Q	Bye	Mohamed Amine Kalem (ITA); L 2-3	Did Not Advance		
Zhao Yiqing	Individual C9	Diego Moreira (BRA); W 3-1	Mohamed Amine Kalem (ITA); L 2-3	1 Q	Bye	Juan Bautista Perez Gonzalez (ESP); L 2-3	Did Not Advance		
Ge Yang	Individual C10	Mateo Boheas (FRA); W 3-0	Mohamad Azwar Bakar (MAS); W 3-0	1 Q	Bye	Jorge Cardona Marquez (ESP); W 3-0	Lian Hao (CHN); W 3-2	Patryk Chojnowski (POL); W 3-2	1st place, gold medalist(s)
Lian Hao	Individual C10	Abdelrahman Ahmed (EGY); W 3-0	Denislav Kodjabashev (BUL); L 1-3	2 Q	Jose Manuel Ruiz Reyes (ESP); W 3-1	Kim Daybell (GBR); W 3-1	Ge Yang (CHN); L 2-3	Krisztian Gardos (AUT); L 0-3	4

Men's team

Athlete	Event	Round of 16	Quarterfinals	Semifinals	Final/BM	
Athlete	Event	Opposition Result	Opposition Result	Opposition Result	Opposition Result	Rank
Feng Panfeng; Zhai Xiang; Zhao Ping	Team C3	—N/a	Ukraine (UKR); W 2-0	Thailand (THA); W 2-0	Germany (GER); W 2-1	1st place, gold medalist(s)
Cao Ningning; Zhang Yan; Guo Xingyuan	Team C4-5	Bye	Egypt (EGY); W 2-0	South Korea (KOR); L 1-2	Turkey (TUR); L 1-2	4
Zhao Shuai; Ye Chaoqun; Sun Churen	Team C6-8	Bye	Hungary (HUN); W 2-0	Sweden (SWE); L 1-2	Great Britain (GBR); L 1-2	4
Ge Yang; Lian Hao; Ma Lin	Team C9-10	Bye	Great Britain (GBR); W 2-0	France (FRA); W 2-0	Spain (ESP); W 2-1	1st place, gold medalist(s)

Women's individual

Athlete	Event	Group stage				Round 1	Quarterfinals	Semifinals	Final/BM	
Athlete	Event	Opposition Result	Opposition Result	Opposition Result	Rank	Opposition Result	Opposition Result	Opposition Result	Opposition Result	Rank
Liu Jing	Individual C1-2	Maha Bargouthi (JOR); W 3-0	Rena McCarron Rooney (IRL); W 3-0	—N/a	1 Q	—N/a	Clara Podda (ITA); W 3-0	Chilchiparyak Bootwansirina (THA); W 3-0	Seo Su-Yeon (KOR); W 3-1	1st place, gold medalist(s)
Li Qian	Individual C3	Jane Lara Campbell (GBR); W 3-0	Hatice Duman (TUR); W 3-0	—N/a	1 Q	Bye	Sara Head (GBR); W 3-0	Yoon Jiyu (KOR); W 3-0	Xue Juan (CHN); L 0-3	2nd place, silver medalist(s)
Xue Juan	Individual C3	Helena Dretar Karic (CRO); W 3-1	Dararat Asayut (THA); W 3-0	—N/a	1 Q	Bye	Alena Kanova (SVK); W 3-2	Anna-Carin Ahlquist (SWE); W 3-1	Li Qian (CHN); W 3-0	1st place, gold medalist(s)
Zhang Miao	Individual C4	LU Pi-Chun (TPE); W 3-0	Susan Gilroy (GBR); W 3-0	—N/a	1 Q	—N/a	Nergis Altintas (TUR); W 3-0	Nada Matic (SRB); W 3-0	Borislava Perić-Ranković (SRB); L 2-3	2nd place, silver medalist(s)
Zhou Ying	Individual C4	Kang Oejeong (KOR); W 3-1	Nergis Altintas (TUR); W 3-0	—N/a	1 Q	—N/a	Borislava Perić-Ranković (SRB) L 0-3	Did Not Advance		
Gu Gai	Individual C5	Faith Chinenye Obiora (NGR); W 3-0	Wei Mei-Hui (TPE); W 3-0	—N/a	1 Q	—N/a	Caroline Odaia Tabib (ISR); W 3-0	Jung Young-A (KOR); W 3-1	Zhang Bian (CHN); L 0-3	2nd place, silver medalist(s)
Zhang Bian	Individual C5	Wong Pui Yi (HKG); W 3-0	Kimie Bessho (JPN); W 3-0	—N/a	1 Q	—N/a	Faith Chinenye Obiora (NGR); W 3-0	Ingela Lundbaeck (SWE); W 3-1	Gu Gai (CHN); W 3-0	1st place, gold medalist(s)
Wang Rui	Individual C7	Stephanie Chan (CAN); W 3-2	Kim Seong-Ok (KOR); L 0-3	Anne Barneoud (FRA); L 0-3	4	—N/a		Did Not Advance		
Mao Jingdian	Individual C8	Josephine Medina (PHI); W 3-0	Aida Dahlen (NOR); W 3-0	—N/a	1 Q	—N/a		Juliane Wolf (GER)W 3-1	Thu Kamkasomphou (FRA); W 3-0	1st place, gold medalist(s)
Pan Mengyi	Individual C8	Thu Kamkasomphou (FRA); W 3-1	Arloy Zsofia (HUN); L 1-3	Juliane Wolf (GER); L 2-3	4	—N/a		Did Not Advance		
Lei Lina	Individual C9	Liu Meng (CHN); W 3-0	Neslihan Kavas (TUR); W 3-1	Jennyfer Parinos Marques (BRA); W 3-0	1 Q	—N/a		Danielle Rauen (BRA); W 3-0	Liu Meng (CHN); L 0-3	2nd place, silver medalist(s)
Liu Meng	Individual C9	Lei (CHN); L 0-3	Jennyfer Parinos Marques (BRA); W 3-0	Kavas (TUR); W 3-2	2 Q	—N/a		Karolina Pek (POL); W 3-2	Lei Lina (CHN); W 3-0	1st place, gold medalist(s)
Xiong Guiyan	Individual C9	Danielle Rauen (BRA); L 2-3	Karolina Pek (POL); L 2-3	Lena Kramm (GER); W 3-0	3	—N/a		Did Not Advance		
Yang Qian	Individual C10	Mirjana Lucic (CRO); W 3-0	Bruna Costa Alexandre (BRA); W 3-0	Andrea McDonnell (AUS); W 3-0	1 Q	—N/a		Sophie Walloe (DEN); W 3-0	Natalia Partyka (POL); L 0-3	2nd place, silver medalist(s)

Women's team

Athlete	Event	Round of 16	Quarterfinals	Semifinals	Final/BM	
Athlete	Event	Opposition Result	Opposition Result	Opposition Result	Opposition Result	Rank
Li Qian; Xue Juan; Liu Jing	Team C1-3	—N/a	Bye	Italy (ITA); W 2-0	Croatia (CRO); W 2-0	1st place, gold medalist(s)
Zhang Bian; Gu Gai; Zhou Ying	Team C4-5	Bye	Turkey (TUR); W 2-0	South Korea (KOR); W 2-0	Serbia (SRB); W 2-0	1st place, gold medalist(s)
Yang Qian; Lei Lina; Xiong Guiyan	Team C6-10	Bye	Croatia (CRO); W 2-0	Australia (AUS); W 2-0	Poland (POL); L 1-2	2nd place, silver medalist(s)

== Wheelchair basketball ==
The China women's national wheelchair basketball team has qualified for the 2016 Rio Paralympics.

As hosts, Brazil got to choose which group they were put into. They were partnered with Algeria, who would be put in the group they did not choose. Brazil chose Group A, which included Canada, Germany, Great Britain and Argentina. Algeria ended up in Group B with the United States, the Netherlands, France and China.

=== Rosters ===
Name	Date of birth
Chen Damei	1986-12-03
Chen Xuejing	1993-09-01
Chen Haizhen	1986-03-09
Dai Jiameng	1995-07-07
Deng Mingzhu	1987-10-11
Huang Siting	1993-03-27
Lei Tianjiao	1993-10-31
Li Yanhua	1982-09-21
Lin Suiling	1991-02-26
Long Yun	1989-08-01
Lyu Guidi	1993-05-06
Wang Xiaoyan	1978-11-11
Li Mingfa	1984-12-17

=== Group B ===
Pos	Team	Pld	W	L	PF	PA	PD	Pts	Qualification
1	United States	4	4	0	288	138	+150	8	Quarter-finals
2	Netherlands	4	3	1	300	148	+152	7	Quarter-finals
3	China	4	2	2	212	187	+25	6	Quarter-finals
4	France	4	1	3	178	266	−88	5	Quarter-finals
5	Algeria	4	0	4	93	332	−239	4	9th/10th place playoff

Source: Paralympic.org
Rules for classification: 1) Points; 2) Head-to-head results; 3) Points difference; 4) Points scored.

8 September 2016
21:00

Report

Algeria	16–88	China
Scoring by quarter: 6–23, 0–18, 2–30, 8–17
Pts: Khemgani 6 Rebs: Khemgani 8		Pts: Lyu 19; Rebs: Lei 8 Asts: Long, Deng 7

Rio Olympic Arena, Rio de Janeiro
Referees: Nurredin Bilmez

9 September 2016
21:30

Report

China	59–39	France
Scoring by quarter: 16–4, 11–14, 18–13, 14–8
Pts: Dai 25; Rebs: Dai 10; Asts: Dai, Long 6		Pts: Buso 14; Rebs: Saint Omer Delepine 8 Asts: Buso 3

Carioca Arena 1, Rio de Janeiro
Referees: Max Kindervater

10 September 2016
18:00

Report

United States	70–36	China
Scoring by quarter: 21–8, 18–12, 20–6, 11–10
Pts: Miller, Murray 24; Rebs: Murray 12; Asts: Murray 6		Pts: Lyu, Dai 14; Rebs: Lyu 9 Asts: Long 6

Carioca Arena 1, Rio de Janeiro
Referees: Mati Quintana

12 September 2016
11:15

Report

China	29–62	Netherlands
Scoring by quarter: 13–14, 3–17, 3–15, 10–16
Pts: Lei, Lin 6 Rebs: Chen, Lyu 5 Asts: Long, Lin 4		Pts: Huitzing 22; Rebs: Beijer 8 Asts: Korver 4

Carioca Arena 1, Rio de Janeiro
Referees: Juan Uruneula

=== Quarter-final ===
13 September 2016
17:30

Report

Great Britain	57–38	China
Scoring by quarter: 18–12, 17–7, 14–7, 8–12
Pts: Freeman 24; Rebs: Conroy 12; Asts: Freeman 11		Pts: Lei 13; Rebs: Lyu 7 Asts: Long 11

Rio Olympic Arena, Rio de Janeiro
Referees: Sebastien Gauthier

=== 5th/6th place playoff ===
16 September 2016
15:15

Report

Canada	63–52	China
Scoring by quarter: 17–12, 9–8, 14–19, 23–13
Pts: Ouellet 20; Rebs: McLachlan 25; Asts: McLachlan 8		Pts: Lei, Dai 17; Rebs: Deng 4 Asts: Long 6

Rio Olympic Arena, Rio de Janeiro
Referees: Gustavo Mathias

== Wheelchair fencing ==
Men

Athlete	Event	Group stage			Quarterfinals	Semifinals	Final/BM	
Athlete	Event	Opposition	Result	Rank	Opposition Result	Opposition Result	Opposition Result	Rank
Sun Gang	Individual Foil A	Emanuele Lambertini (ITA)	W 5-1	1 Q	Matteo Betti (ITA); W 15-5	Osvach Richard (HUN); L 10-15	Pender Dariusz (POL); W 15-11	3rd place, bronze medalist(s)
Sun Gang	Individual Foil A	Chan Wing Kin (HKG)	W 5-2	1 Q	Matteo Betti (ITA); W 15-5	Osvach Richard (HUN); L 10-15	Pender Dariusz (POL); W 15-11	3rd place, bronze medalist(s)
Sun Gang	Individual Foil A	Martyn Kavalenia (BLR)	W 5-0	1 Q	Matteo Betti (ITA); W 15-5	Osvach Richard (HUN); L 10-15	Pender Dariusz (POL); W 15-11	3rd place, bronze medalist(s)
Sun Gang	Individual Foil A	Damien Tokatlian (FRA)	W 5-1	1 Q	Matteo Betti (ITA); W 15-5	Osvach Richard (HUN); L 10-15	Pender Dariusz (POL); W 15-11	3rd place, bronze medalist(s)
Sun Gang	Individual Foil A	Pender Dariusz (POL)	W 5-3	1 Q	Matteo Betti (ITA); W 15-5	Osvach Richard (HUN); L 10-15	Pender Dariusz (POL); W 15-11	3rd place, bronze medalist(s)
Ye Ruyi	Individual Foil A	Matteo Betti (ITA)	W 5-3	1 Q	Damien Tokatlian (FRA); W 15-5	Pender Dariusz (POL); W 15-2	Osvach Richard (HUN); W 15-8	1st place, gold medalist(s)
Ye Ruyi	Individual Foil A	Osvach Richard (HUN)	W 5-3	1 Q	Damien Tokatlian (FRA); W 15-5	Pender Dariusz (POL); W 15-2	Osvach Richard (HUN); W 15-8	1st place, gold medalist(s)
Ye Ruyi	Individual Foil A	Piers Gilliver (GBR)	W 5-1	1 Q	Damien Tokatlian (FRA); W 15-5	Pender Dariusz (POL); W 15-2	Osvach Richard (HUN); W 15-8	1st place, gold medalist(s)
Ye Ruyi	Individual Foil A	Cheong Meng Chai (HKG)	W 5-3	1 Q	Damien Tokatlian (FRA); W 15-5	Pender Dariusz (POL); W 15-2	Osvach Richard (HUN); W 15-8	1st place, gold medalist(s)
Ye Ruyi	Individual Foil A	Michal Nalewajek (POL)	W 5-1	1 Q	Damien Tokatlian (FRA); W 15-5	Pender Dariusz (POL); W 15-2	Osvach Richard (HUN); W 15-8	1st place, gold medalist(s)
Feng Yanke	Individual Foil B	Anton Datsko (UKR)	L 3-5	4 Q	Anton Datsko (UKR); W 15-6	Marco Cima (ITA); W 15-14	Hu Daoliang (CHN); W 15-11	1st place, gold medalist(s)
Feng Yanke	Individual Foil B	Maxime Valet (FRA)	L 3-5	4 Q	Anton Datsko (UKR); W 15-6	Marco Cima (ITA); W 15-14	Hu Daoliang (CHN); W 15-11	1st place, gold medalist(s)
Feng Yanke	Individual Foil B	Dimitri Coutya (GBR)	W 5-3	4 Q	Anton Datsko (UKR); W 15-6	Marco Cima (ITA); W 15-14	Hu Daoliang (CHN); W 15-11	1st place, gold medalist(s)
Feng Yanke	Individual Foil B	Alessio Sarri (ITA)	L 2-5	4 Q	Anton Datsko (UKR); W 15-6	Marco Cima (ITA); W 15-14	Hu Daoliang (CHN); W 15-11	1st place, gold medalist(s)
Hu Daoliang	Individual Foil B	Jacek Gaworski (POL)	L 4-5	3 Q	Dimitri Coutya (GBR); W 15-12	Maxime Valet (FRA); W 15-7	Feng Yanke (CHN); W 11-15	2nd place, silver medalist(s)
Hu Daoliang	Individual Foil B	Marco Cima (ITA)	L 4-5	3 Q	Dimitri Coutya (GBR); W 15-12	Maxime Valet (FRA); W 15-7	Feng Yanke (CHN); W 11-15	2nd place, silver medalist(s)
Hu Daoliang	Individual Foil B	Vanderson Luis Chaves (BRA)	W 5-1	3 Q	Dimitri Coutya (GBR); W 15-12	Maxime Valet (FRA); W 15-7	Feng Yanke (CHN); W 11-15	2nd place, silver medalist(s)
Hu Daoliang	Individual Foil B	Jovane Guissone (BRA)	W 5-2	3 Q	Dimitri Coutya (GBR); W 15-12	Maxime Valet (FRA); W 15-7	Feng Yanke (CHN); W 11-15	2nd place, silver medalist(s)
Sun Gang	Individual épée A	Zainulabdeen Al-Madhkhoori (IRQ)	W 5-3	1 Q	Dariusz Pender (POL); W 15-10	Tian Jianquan (CHN); W 15-11	Piers Gilliver (GBR); W 15-13	1st place, gold medalist(s)
Sun Gang	Individual épée A	Romain Noble (FRA)	W 5-0	1 Q	Dariusz Pender (POL); W 15-10	Tian Jianquan (CHN); W 15-11	Piers Gilliver (GBR); W 15-13	1st place, gold medalist(s)
Sun Gang	Individual épée A	Matthieu Hebert (CAN)	W 5-2	1 Q	Dariusz Pender (POL); W 15-10	Tian Jianquan (CHN); W 15-11	Piers Gilliver (GBR); W 15-13	1st place, gold medalist(s)
Sun Gang	Individual épée A	Fabio Luiz Damasceno (BRA)	W 5-1	1 Q	Dariusz Pender (POL); W 15-10	Tian Jianquan (CHN); W 15-11	Piers Gilliver (GBR); W 15-13	1st place, gold medalist(s)
Sun Gang	Individual épée A	Matteo Betti (ITA)	W 5-1	1 Q	Dariusz Pender (POL); W 15-10	Tian Jianquan (CHN); W 15-11	Piers Gilliver (GBR); W 15-13	1st place, gold medalist(s)
Tian Jianquan	Individual épée A	Dariusz Pender (POL)	W 5-4	2 Q	Romain Noble (FRA); W 15-6	Sun Gang (CHN); L 11-15	Zainulabdeen Al-Madhkhoori (IRQ); W 15-11	3rd place, bronze medalist(s)
Tian Jianquan	Individual épée A	Mato Gyula (HUN)	W 5-1	2 Q	Romain Noble (FRA); W 15-6	Sun Gang (CHN); L 11-15	Zainulabdeen Al-Madhkhoori (IRQ); W 15-11	3rd place, bronze medalist(s)
Tian Jianquan	Individual épée A	Sandro Colaco (BRA)	W 5-1	2 Q	Romain Noble (FRA); W 15-6	Sun Gang (CHN); L 11-15	Zainulabdeen Al-Madhkhoori (IRQ); W 15-11	3rd place, bronze medalist(s)
Tian Jianquan	Individual épée A	Robert Citerne (FRA)	W 5-3	2 Q	Romain Noble (FRA); W 15-6	Sun Gang (CHN); L 11-15	Zainulabdeen Al-Madhkhoori (IRQ); W 15-11	3rd place, bronze medalist(s)
Tian Jianquan	Individual épée A	Piers Gilliver (GBR)	L 2-5	2 Q	Romain Noble (FRA); W 15-6	Sun Gang (CHN); L 11-15	Zainulabdeen Al-Madhkhoori (IRQ); W 15-11	3rd place, bronze medalist(s)
Chen Yijun	Individual Sabre A	Alberto Pellegrini (ITA)	W 5-3	5 q	Vasileios Ntounis (GRE); L 12-15	Did Not Advance		
Chen Yijun	Individual Sabre A	Vasileios Ntounis (GRE)	L 4-5	5 q	Vasileios Ntounis (GRE); L 12-15	Did Not Advance		
Chen Yijun	Individual Sabre A	Osvath Richard (HUN)	L 3-5	5 q	Vasileios Ntounis (GRE); L 12-15	Did Not Advance		
Chen Yijun	Individual Sabre A	Romain Noble (FRA)	L 3-5	5 q	Vasileios Ntounis (GRE); L 12-15	Did Not Advance		
Chen Yijun	Individual Sabre A	Vadym Tsedryk (UKR)	W 5-2	5 q	Vasileios Ntounis (GRE); L 12-15	Did Not Advance		
Tian Jianquan	Individual Sabre A	Gerasimos Pylarinos Markantonatos (GRE)	W 5-0	1 Q	Alberto Pellegrini (ITA); W 15-5	DEMCHUK Andrii (UKR); L 10-15	Vasileios Ntounis (GRE); W 15-5	3rd place, bronze medalist(s)
Tian Jianquan	Individual Sabre A	Andrii Demchuk (UKR)	L 2-5	1 Q	Alberto Pellegrini (ITA); W 15-5	DEMCHUK Andrii (UKR); L 10-15	Vasileios Ntounis (GRE); W 15-5	3rd place, bronze medalist(s)
Tian Jianquan	Individual Sabre A	Ludovic Lemoine (FRA)	W 5-2	1 Q	Alberto Pellegrini (ITA); W 15-5	DEMCHUK Andrii (UKR); L 10-15	Vasileios Ntounis (GRE); W 15-5	3rd place, bronze medalist(s)
Tian Jianquan	Individual Sabre A	Chan Wing Kin (HKG)	W 5-2	1 Q	Alberto Pellegrini (ITA); W 15-5	DEMCHUK Andrii (UKR); L 10-15	Vasileios Ntounis (GRE); W 15-5	3rd place, bronze medalist(s)
Tian Jianquan	Individual Sabre A	Cheong Meng Chai (HKG)	W 5-0	1 Q	Alberto Pellegrini (ITA); W 15-5	DEMCHUK Andrii (UKR); L 10-15	Vasileios Ntounis (GRE); W 15-5	3rd place, bronze medalist(s)
Feng Yanke	Individual Sabre B	Balwinder Cheema (GER)	W 5-2	3 Q	Adrian Castro (POL); L 11-15	Did Not Advance		
Feng Yanke	Individual Sabre B	Pierre Mainville (CAN)	W 5-2	3 Q	Adrian Castro (POL); L 11-15	Did Not Advance		
Feng Yanke	Individual Sabre B	Adrian Castro (POL)	L 1-5	3 Q	Adrian Castro (POL); L 11-15	Did Not Advance		
Feng Yanke	Individual Sabre B	Panagiotis Triantafyllou (GRE)	L 1-5	3 Q	Adrian Castro (POL); L 11-15	Did Not Advance		
Hu Daoliang; Sun Gang; Tan Jianquan	Team épée	Italy (ITA)	W 45-28	1 Q	—N/a	Greece (GRE); W 45-33	France (FRA); L 41-41	2nd place, silver medalist(s)
Hu Daoliang; Sun Gang; Tan Jianquan	Team épée	Poland (POL)	W 45-38	1 Q	—N/a	Greece (GRE); W 45-33	France (FRA); L 41-41	2nd place, silver medalist(s)
Hu Daoliang; Sun Gang; Ye Ruyi	Team Foil	Brazil (BRA)	W 45-9	1 Q	—N/a	Hong Kong (HKG); W 45-26	Poland (POL); W 45-27	1st place, gold medalist(s)
Hu Daoliang; Sun Gang; Ye Ruyi	Team Foil	France (FRA)	W 45-40	1 Q	—N/a	Hong Kong (HKG); W 45-26	Poland (POL); W 45-27	1st place, gold medalist(s)

Women

Athlete	Event	Group stage			Quarterfinals	Semifinals	Final/BM	
Athlete	Event	Opposition	Result	Rank	Opposition Result	Opposition Result	Opposition Result	Rank
Rong Jing	Individual Foil A	Hajmasi Eva Andrea (HUN)	W 5-2	1 Q	Andreea Mogos (ITA); W 15-7	Zhang Chuncui (CHN); W 15-8	Yu Chui Yee (HKG); W 15-8	1st place, gold medalist(s)
Rong Jing	Individual Foil A	Andreea Mogos (ITA)	W 5-4	1 Q	Andreea Mogos (ITA); W 15-7	Zhang Chuncui (CHN); W 15-8	Yu Chui Yee (HKG); W 15-8	1st place, gold medalist(s)
Rong Jing	Individual Foil A	Delphine Bernard (FRA)	W 5-0	1 Q	Andreea Mogos (ITA); W 15-7	Zhang Chuncui (CHN); W 15-8	Yu Chui Yee (HKG); W 15-8	1st place, gold medalist(s)
Rong Jing	Individual Foil A	Aliona Halkina (BLR)	W 5-2	1 Q	Andreea Mogos (ITA); W 15-7	Zhang Chuncui (CHN); W 15-8	Yu Chui Yee (HKG); W 15-8	1st place, gold medalist(s)
Rong Jing	Individual Foil A	Ng Justine Charissa (HKG)	L 4-5	1 Q	Andreea Mogos (ITA); W 15-7	Zhang Chuncui (CHN); W 15-8	Yu Chui Yee (HKG); W 15-8	1st place, gold medalist(s)
Zhang Chuicui	Individual Foil A	Monica Santos (BRA)	W 5-2	2 Q	Delphine Bernard (FRA); W 15-7	Rong Jing (CHN); L 8-15	Krajnyak Zsuzsanna (HUN); L 12-15	4
Zhang Chuicui	Individual Foil A	Yu Chui Yee (HKG)	L 4-5	2 Q	Delphine Bernard (FRA); W 15-7	Rong Jing (CHN); L 8-15	Krajnyak Zsuzsanna (HUN); L 12-15	4
Zhang Chuicui	Individual Foil A	Nataliia Morkvych (UKR)	W 5-0	2 Q	Delphine Bernard (FRA); W 15-7	Rong Jing (CHN); L 8-15	Krajnyak Zsuzsanna (HUN); L 12-15	4
Zhang Chuicui	Individual Foil A	Loredana Trigilla (ITA)	W 5-1	2 Q	Delphine Bernard (FRA); W 15-7	Rong Jing (CHN); L 8-15	Krajnyak Zsuzsanna (HUN); L 12-15	4
Zhang Chuicui	Individual Foil A	Krajnyak Zsuzsanna (HUN)	L 4-5	2 Q	Delphine Bernard (FRA); W 15-7	Rong Jing (CHN); L 8-15	Krajnyak Zsuzsanna (HUN); L 12-15	4
Yao Fang	Individual Foil B	Chung Yuen Ping (HKG)	W 5-1	2 Q	Alesia Makrytskaya (BLR); W 15-11	Beatrice Vio (ITA); L 1-15	Chung Yuen Ping (HKG); W 15-11	3rd place, bronze medalist(s)
Yao Fang	Individual Foil B	Irma Khetsuriani (GEO)	W 5-3	2 Q	Alesia Makrytskaya (BLR); W 15-11	Beatrice Vio (ITA); L 1-15	Chung Yuen Ping (HKG); W 15-11	3rd place, bronze medalist(s)
Yao Fang	Individual Foil B	Simone Briese-Baetke (GER)	W 5-3	2 Q	Alesia Makrytskaya (BLR); W 15-11	Beatrice Vio (ITA); L 1-15	Chung Yuen Ping (HKG); W 15-11	3rd place, bronze medalist(s)
Yao Fang	Individual Foil B	Alesia Makrytskaya (BLR)	W 5-0	2 Q	Alesia Makrytskaya (BLR); W 15-11	Beatrice Vio (ITA); L 1-15	Chung Yuen Ping (HKG); W 15-11	3rd place, bronze medalist(s)
Yao Fang	Individual Foil B	Beatrice Vio (ITA)	L 0-5	2 Q	Alesia Makrytskaya (BLR); W 15-11	Beatrice Vio (ITA); L 1-15	Chung Yuen Ping (HKG); W 15-11	3rd place, bronze medalist(s)
Zhou Jingjing	Individual Foil B	Tetiana Pozniak (UKR)	W 5-2	2 Q	Dani Gyongyi (HUN); W 15-5	Chung Yuen Ping (HKG); W 15-9	Beatrice Vio (ITA); L 7-15	2nd place, silver medalist(s)
Zhou Jingjing	Individual Foil B	Cecile Demaude (FRA)	W 5-3	2 Q	Dani Gyongyi (HUN); W 15-5	Chung Yuen Ping (HKG); W 15-9	Beatrice Vio (ITA); L 7-15	2nd place, silver medalist(s)
Zhou Jingjing	Individual Foil B	Chan Yui Chong (HKG)	L 1-5	2 Q	Dani Gyongyi (HUN); W 15-5	Chung Yuen Ping (HKG); W 15-9	Beatrice Vio (ITA); L 7-15	2nd place, silver medalist(s)
Zhou Jingjing	Individual Foil B	Marta Makowska (POL)	W 5-1	2 Q	Dani Gyongyi (HUN); W 15-5	Chung Yuen Ping (HKG); W 15-9	Beatrice Vio (ITA); L 7-15	2nd place, silver medalist(s)
Zhou Jingjing	Individual Foil B	Dani Gyongyi (HUN)	W 5-0	2 Q	Dani Gyongyi (HUN); W 15-5	Chung Yuen Ping (HKG); W 15-9	Beatrice Vio (ITA); L 7-15	2nd place, silver medalist(s)
Bian Jing	Individual épée A	Marta Fidrych (POL)	L 3-5	3 Q	Marta Fidrych (POL); W 15-12	Yevheniia Breus (UKR); W 15-8	Zou Xufeng (CHN); L 11-15	2nd place, silver medalist(s)
Bian Jing	Individual épée A	Veres Amarilla (HUN)	L 4-5	3 Q	Marta Fidrych (POL); W 15-12	Yevheniia Breus (UKR); W 15-8	Zou Xufeng (CHN); L 11-15	2nd place, silver medalist(s)
Bian Jing	Individual épée A	Yevheniia Breus (UKR)	W 5-2	3 Q	Marta Fidrych (POL); W 15-12	Yevheniia Breus (UKR); W 15-8	Zou Xufeng (CHN); L 11-15	2nd place, silver medalist(s)
Bian Jing	Individual épée A	Yu Chui Yee (HKG)	L 3-5	3 Q	Marta Fidrych (POL); W 15-12	Yevheniia Breus (UKR); W 15-8	Zou Xufeng (CHN); L 11-15	2nd place, silver medalist(s)
Bian Jing	Individual épée A	Polina Rozkova (LAT)	W 5-1	3 Q	Marta Fidrych (POL); W 15-12	Yevheniia Breus (UKR); W 15-8	Zou Xufeng (CHN); L 11-15	2nd place, silver medalist(s)
Zou Xufeng	Individual épée A	Lauryn Deluca (USA)	W 5-1	1 Q	Gemma Collis (GBR); W 15-2	Krajnyak Zsuzsanna (HUN); W 15-7	Bian Jing (CHN); W 15-11	1st place, gold medalist(s)
Zou Xufeng	Individual épée A	Krajnyak Zsuzsanna (HUN)	W 5-1	1 Q	Gemma Collis (GBR); W 15-2	Krajnyak Zsuzsanna (HUN); W 15-7	Bian Jing (CHN); W 15-11	1st place, gold medalist(s)
Zou Xufeng	Individual épée A	Aliona Halkina (BLR)	W 5-3	1 Q	Gemma Collis (GBR); W 15-2	Krajnyak Zsuzsanna (HUN); W 15-7	Bian Jing (CHN); W 15-11	1st place, gold medalist(s)
Zou Xufeng	Individual épée A	Gemma Collis (GBR)	W 5-0	1 Q	Gemma Collis (GBR); W 15-2	Krajnyak Zsuzsanna (HUN); W 15-7	Bian Jing (CHN); W 15-11	1st place, gold medalist(s)
Zou Xufeng	Individual épée A	Renata Burdon (POL)	W 5-1	1 Q	Gemma Collis (GBR); W 15-2	Krajnyak Zsuzsanna (HUN); W 15-7	Bian Jing (CHN); W 15-11	1st place, gold medalist(s)
Yao Fang	Individual épée B	Simone Briese-Baetke (GER)	L 3-5	2 Q	Chan Yui Chong (HKG); L 13-15	Did Not Advance		
Yao Fang	Individual épée B	Marta Makowska (POL)	W 5-3	2 Q	Chan Yui Chong (HKG); L 13-15	Did Not Advance		
Yao Fang	Individual épée B	Cecile Demaude (FRA)	W 5-4	2 Q	Chan Yui Chong (HKG); L 13-15	Did Not Advance		
Yao Fang	Individual épée B	Tetiana Pozniak (UKR)	W 5-1	2 Q	Chan Yui Chong (HKG); L 13-15	Did Not Advance		
Yao Fang	Individual épée B	Kalliopi Loufaki (GRE)	W 5-2	2 Q	Chan Yui Chong (HKG); L 13-15	Did Not Advance		
Zhou Jingjing	Individual épée B	Dani Gyongyi (HUN)	W 5-1	3 Q	Anastasiya Kastsiuchkova (BLR); W 15-4	Chan Yui Chong (HKG); W 15-14	Saysunee Jana (THA); W 15-10	1st place, gold medalist(s)
Zhou Jingjing	Individual épée B	Saysunee Jana (THA)	W 5-4	3 Q	Anastasiya Kastsiuchkova (BLR); W 15-4	Chan Yui Chong (HKG); W 15-14	Saysunee Jana (THA); W 15-10	1st place, gold medalist(s)
Zhou Jingjing	Individual épée B	Alesia Makrytskaya (BLR)	W 5-4	3 Q	Anastasiya Kastsiuchkova (BLR); W 15-4	Chan Yui Chong (HKG); W 15-14	Saysunee Jana (THA); W 15-10	1st place, gold medalist(s)
Zhou Jingjing	Individual épée B	Chan Yui Chong (HKG)	L 3-5	3 Q	Anastasiya Kastsiuchkova (BLR); W 15-4	Chan Yui Chong (HKG); W 15-14	Saysunee Jana (THA); W 15-10	1st place, gold medalist(s)
Zhou Jingjing	Individual épée B	Anastasiya Kastsiuchkova (BLR)	L 4-5	3 Q	Anastasiya Kastsiuchkova (BLR); W 15-4	Chan Yui Chong (HKG); W 15-14	Saysunee Jana (THA); W 15-10	1st place, gold medalist(s)
Rong Jing; Zhou Jingjing; Zou Xufeng	Team épée	Hungary (HUN)	W 45-35	1 Q	—N/a	Poland (POL); W 45-39	Hong Kong (HKG); W 45-35	1st place, gold medalist(s)
Rong Jing; Zhou Jingjing; Zou Xufeng	Team épée	Belarus (BLR)	W 45-29	1 Q	—N/a	Poland (POL); W 45-39	Hong Kong (HKG); W 45-35	1st place, gold medalist(s)
Rong Jing; Zhang Chuncui; Zhou Jingjing	Team Foil	Belarus (BLR)	W 45-11	1 Q	—N/a	Italy (ITA); W 45-37	Hungary (HUN); W 45-28	1st place, gold medalist(s)
Rong Jing; Zhang Chuncui; Zhou Jingjing	Team Foil	Hungary (HUN)	W 45-34	1 Q	—N/a	Italy (ITA); W 45-37	Hungary (HUN); W 45-28	1st place, gold medalist(s)

== Wheelchair tennis ==
China qualified two competitors in the men's single event. Zujun Wei qualified through the standard route. Dong Shunjiang qualified via a Doubles World Ranking Allocation place. China qualified two players in the women's singles event. Zhenzhen Zhu qualified via the standard route. Hui Min Huang earned a spot via a Bipartite Commission Invitation place.

Athlete	Event	Round of 64	Round of 32	Round of 16	Quarterfinals	Semifinals	Final / BM	
Athlete	Event	Opposition Score	Opposition Score	Opposition Score	Opposition Score	Opposition Score	Opposition Score	Rank
Dong Shunjiang	Men's singles	Nico Langmann (AUT); W 6-0, 6-3	Tom Egberink (NED); W 6-1,6-1	Kunieda Shingo (JPN); L 1-6,4-6	Did Not Advance			
Wei Zujun	Men's singles	Daniel Caverzaschi (ESP); L 2-6,6-1,3-6	Did Not Advance					
Huang Huimin	Women's singles	—N/a	Emmanuelle Morch (FRA); W 6-2,6-0	Katharina Krüger (GER); W 6-0,6-3	Jiske Griffioen (NED); L 0-6,0-6	Did Not Advance		
Zhu Zhenzhen	Women's singles	—N/a	Sarah Calati (AUS); W 6-0,6-1	Kgpthatso Montjane (RSA); W 6-4,4-6,7-5	Aniek van Koot (NED); L 1-6,7-5,1-6	Did Not Advance		
Dong Shunjiang; Wei Zujun	Men's doubles	—N/a	Marc McCarroll, David Phillipson (GBR); L 4-6,6(3)-7	Did Not Advance				
Huang Huimin, Zhu Zhenzhen	Women's doubles	—N/a		Bye	Kamaji Yui, Nijo Miho (JPN); L 3-6,0-6	Did Not Advance		

== See also ==
- China at the 2016 Summer Olympics
