= Swimming at the 2016 Summer Paralympics – Men's 100 metre breaststroke SB4 =

Paralympic swimming event

Men's 100 metre breaststroke SB4 at the XV Paralympic Games
- Venue: Olympic Aquatics Stadium
- Dates: 11 September 2016
- Competitors: 8 from 7 nations

Medalists
1st place, gold medalist(s)		Li Junsheng	China
2nd place, silver medalist(s)		Daniel Dias	Brazil
3rd place, bronze medalist(s)		Moisés Fuentes	Colombia

The Men's 100 metre breaststroke SB4 event at the 2016 Paralympic Games took place on 11 September 2016, at the Olympic Aquatics Stadium. No heats were held. The swimmers with the eight fastest times advanced to the final.

== Final ==
19:56 11 September 2016:

Rank	Lane	Name	Nationality	Time	Notes
1st place, gold medalist(s)	2	Li Junsheng	China	1:35.96	
2nd place, silver medalist(s)	3	Daniel Dias	Brazil	1:36.13	
3rd place, bronze medalist(s)	5	Moisés Fuentes	Colombia	1:37.40	
4	4	Antonios Tsapatakis	Greece	1:37.69	
5	6	Ricardo Ten	Spain	1:38.07	
6	1	Thanh Trung Nguyen	Vietnam	1:49.67	
7	8	Andrea Massussi	Italy	1:51.96	
	7	He Shiwei	China		DSQ
