= Swimming at the 2016 Summer Paralympics – Women's 150 metre individual medley =

The women's 150 metre individual medley swimming events for the 2016 Summer Paralympics take place at the Rio Olympic Stadium on 12 September. Only one event was contested for one classification.

== Competition format ==
Each event consists of two rounds: heats and final. The top eight swimmers overall in the heats progress to the final. If there are eight or fewer swimmers in an event, no heats are held and all swimmers qualify for the final.

== Results ==
=== SM4 ===
17:58 12 September 2016:

Rank	Lane	Name	Nationality	Time	Notes
1st place, gold medalist(s)	4	Jiao Cheng	China	2:49.69	
2nd place, silver medalist(s)	6	Olga Sviderska	Ukraine	2:54.14	WR
3rd place, bronze medalist(s)	3	Yue Deng	China	2:57.26	
4	7	Nely Miranda Herrera	Mexico	2:57.76	
5	2	Arjola Trimi	Italy	2:57.91	
6	5	Mariia Lafina	Ukraine	3:01.30	
7	8	Zulfiya Gabidullina	Kazakhstan	3:25.30	
	1	Karolina Hamer	Poland		DSQ
