= Delphine Bernard =

French wheelchair fencer

Delphine Bernard (born 14 May 1986 in Quimper, Brittany, France) is a wheelchair fencer, practising in fencing three categories, foil, épée and sabre.

She started fencing in 2007, after meeting Serge Laher, who became her master of arms at Quimper club Cornouaille, in Finistère until 2013, when she left to Toulouse University Club (TUC), where she is directed by Brigitte Aragou.

== Sports ==
Delphine Bernard finished her scientific Baccalaureate, Earth and life Sciences mention, at Kerneuzec high school, Quimperlé, in 2005. In 2009, she finishes her common studies so as to get her degree as a sports educator at Quimper.

In 2006, by chance, Delphine Bernard meets master Serge Laher, in an associations forum where she participated searching to practice sports in her own town. Mr. Laher teaches her fencing handisport, paralympic domain open to physically disabled people since 1960. She started practicing in 2007. Under Mr. Laher direction, she participates at the World Cup, then in 2012, she gets the fifth place at the foil tournament 2012 Summer Paralympics in London. She goes afterward to the 2013 Budapest World Cup.

In November 2013, she moves to Toulouse University Club (TUC), where she exercises with Brigitte Aragou direction. She had trained nine hours a week under Serge Laher direction at Quimper club. Now she trains four times a week at TUC, with disabled and non-disabled athletes. She also has personal training articulated with group training with her new master of arms, Brigitte Arago.

In 2014, she participates of the European Cup at Strasbourg, when she gets again a fifth place.

In February 2016, she is chosen, with her teammate Maxime Valet, fencing for the disabled at the 2016 Rio Summer Paralympic Games.

=== Extra-sports life ===
Delphine Bernard is a member of HOPE association, which aims to promote motor disabled people through competitions, as well as to help athletes who participate in paralympic games.

=== Style ===
Delphine aims to develop sports in such a way as to integrate disabled people and promote a true "cultural revolution", according to her, in the world of sports.

== Paralympics games ==
- Fencing for the disabled at 2012 London Summer paralympic games : 5th at foil

== World Cup ==
- Bronze medal at 2015 Doha World Cup

== Europe Cup ==
- 5th at Strasbourg 2014 European Cup
- * 2009 and 2011, Europe foil team, vice-champion

== World Cup ==
- Her first World Cup participation, in 2007, Manchester
- 3rd épée, 2007
- 3rd épée, Montréal, 2008
- 2nd épée, Montréal, 2010
- 1st foil, Montréal, 2010

== France Cup ==
- 2010 France champion, foil, épée and sabre
- 2011 France champion, épée
- 2011 France Vice champion, foil and sabre and foil team
- 1 gold and 1 bronze 2014 France Cup
