= Xu Jie (sitting volleyball) =

Chinese Paralympic sitting volleyball player (born 1983)

Personal information
- Nationality: Chinese
- Born: 4 August 1983 (age 43)
Honours
Women's sitting volleyball
Representing China
Paralympic Games
Silver medal – second place	2016 Rio	Team

Xu Jie (born 4 August 1983) is a Chinese Paralympic sitting volleyball player. She is part of the China women's national sitting volleyball team.

She competed at the 2016 Summer Paralympics, winning a silver medal. and 2017 World ParaVolley Women's World Super 6.

== See also ==
- China at the 2016 Summer Paralympics
