= Wang Jiexin =

Chinese swimmer

Personal information
- Born: Shanghai, China

Sport
- Sport: Swimming
- Strokes: freestyle
Medal record
Women's swimming
Representing China
2016 Paralympic Games
Bronze medal – third place	2016 Rio de Janeiro	50m freestyle S9

Wang Jiexin is a Chinese swimmer. She won a bronze medal at the 2016 Paralympic Games. She competes in the Paralympic class S9. She also placed 4th in the Women's 100 backstroke S9 in Rio. In 2020, she was ranked in the top 10 in the world in multiple events in the S9 classification.
