= Shang Guangxu =

Chinese Paralympic athlete

Personal information
- Nationality: Chinese
- Born: 8 May 1995 (age 31) Tianjin, China

Sport
- Country: China
- Sport: Athletics
- Disability class: T37
- Event: sprint
- Club: Tianjin
- Coached by: Li Jiansheng
Medal record
Paralympic athletics
Representing China
Paralympic Games
Silver medal – second place	2012 London	200 m – T37
Gold medal – first place	2016 Rio	Long jump – T37
IPC World Championships
Gold medal – first place	2015 Doha	Long jump – T37
Silver medal – second place	2015 Doha	200 m – T37
Asian Para Games
Gold medal – first place	2014 Incheon	100 m – T37
Gold medal – first place	2014 Incheon	200 m – T37
Gold medal – first place	2014 Incheon	400 m – T37
Silver medal – second place	2014 Incheon	Long jump – T36–38

Shang Guangxu (born 8 May 1995) is a Paralympian athlete from China competing mainly in T37 classification track and field events. Liang represented his country at the 2012 Summer Paralympics in London where he won a silver medal in the men's 200m sprint. He has also competed at the IPC World Championships in 2015 winning a silver in the 200m and a gold in the long jump.
