= Jiang Jixiu =

Chinese sitting volleyball player (born 1979)

Personal information
- Nationality: Chinese
- Born: 16 July 1979 (age 47)

Career
Years	Teams
2016	Shanghai
Honours
Women's sitting volleyball
Representing China
Paralympic Games
Silver medal – second place	2016 Rio	Team

Jiang Jixiu (Chinese: 蒋继秀, born 16 July 1979) is a Chinese sitting volleyball player. She won a silver medal at the 2016 Summer Paralympics.
