= Li Junsheng =

Chinese Paralympic swimmer

Personal information
- Born: 19 January 2000 (age 26) Beihai, China

Sport
- Country: China
- Sport: Paralympic swimming
- Disability: Cerebral palsy
- Disability class: S5
- Coached by: Liu Tao
Medal record
Paralympic swimming
Representing China
Paralympic Games
Gold medal – first place	2016 Rio de Janeiro	Men's 100m breaststroke SB4
World Championships
Gold medal – first place	2017 Mexico City	Men's 100m breaststroke SB4
Silver medal – second place	2019 London	Men's 100m breaststroke SB5
Bronze medal – third place	2017 Mexico City	Men's 200m freestyle S5
Asian Para Games
Bronze medal – third place	2018 Jakarta	Men's 50m freestyle S5

Li Junsheng (born 19 January 2000) is a Chinese swimmer from Beihai, Guangxi. He was diagnosed with cerebral palsy when he was one year old, which caused palsy of his lower limbs. At the 2016 Summer Paralympics won the gold medal in Men's 100m Breaststroke SB4, defeating Daniel Dias, who was swimming for Brazil, the hosting country.
