= Maxime Valet =

French wheelchair fencer (born 1987)

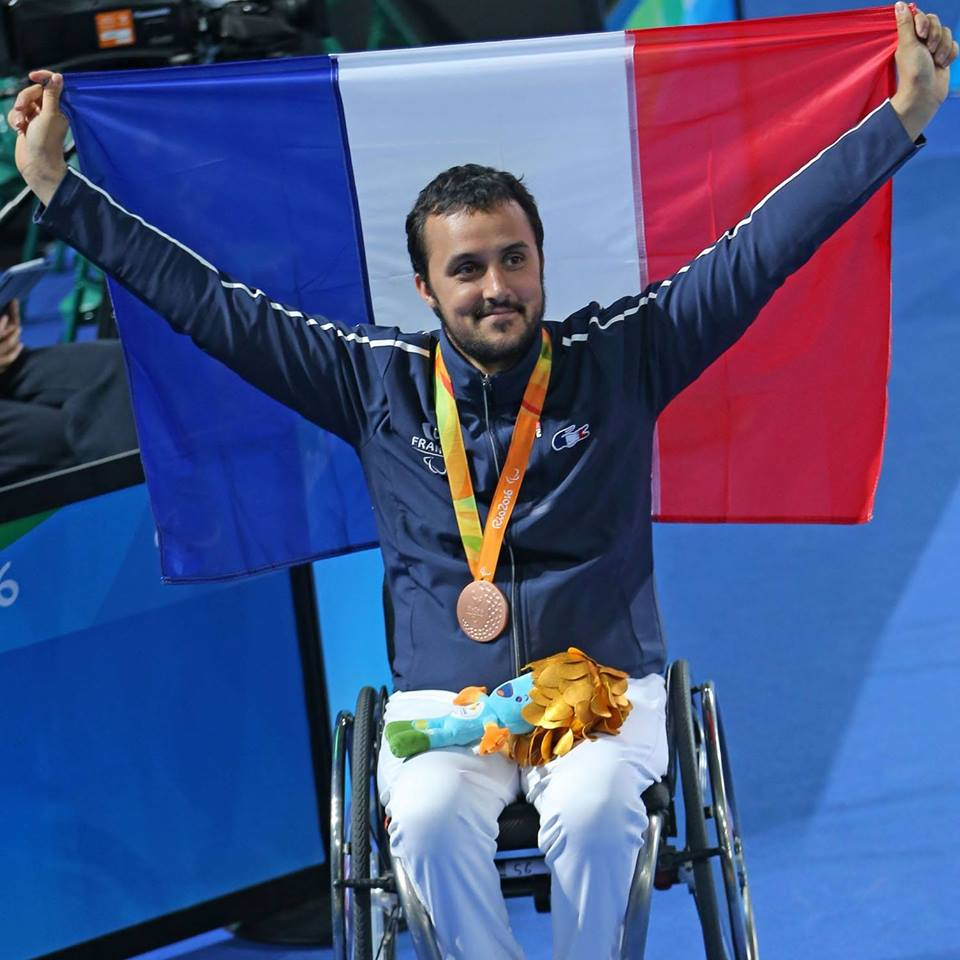
- Valet in 2016

Personal information
- Born: 18 May 1987 (age 39) Toulouse, Haute-Garonne, France

Sport
- Country: France
- Sport: Wheelchair fencing
Medal record
Paralympic Games
Bronze medal – third place	2016 Rio de Janeiro	Foil B
Bronze medal – third place	2016 Rio de Janeiro	Foil team
Bronze medal – third place	2020 Tokyo	Foil team
Bronze medal – third place	2024 Paris	Foil team

Maxime Valet (born 18 May 1987 in Toulouse) is a French wheelchair fencer. He represented France at the 2016 Summer Paralympics in Rio de Janeiro, Brazil and he won two medals: the bronze medal in the men's foil B event and the bronze medal in the men's team foil event. He also won the bronze medal in the men's team foil event at the 2020 Summer Paralympics held in Tokyo, Japan.

In 2009, Valet became paraplegic after falling into a hole at a construction site.
