= He Shiwei =

Chinese paralympic swimmer

Sport
- Country: China
- Sport: Swimming
Medal record
Representing China
Paralympic Games
Swimming
| Silver medal – second place | 2016 Rio de Janeiro | Men's 50 metre butterfly S5 |

He Shiwei is a Chinese paralympic swimmer. He competed at the 2016 Summer Paralympics in the swimming competition, being awarded the silver medal in the men's 50 metre butterfly S5 event.
