= List of Paralympic medalists in archery =

Archery is one of the first sports to be competed at 1960 Summer Paralympics. Its competing athletes are wheelchair users

== Medal table ==
Updated to the 2016 Summer Paralympics.

Summer Paralympics Archery medal table
Rank	NPC	Gold	Silver	Bronze	Total
1	United States (USA)	19	8	18	45
2	Great Britain (GBR)	17	22	21	60
3	France (FRA)	15	12	12	39
4	South Korea (KOR)	15	10	13	38
5	West Germany (FRG)	15	9	9	33
6	Italy (ITA)	8	10	10	28
7	China (CHN)	7	6	4	17
8	South Africa (RSA)	7	4	1	12
9	Japan (JPN)	5	12	9	26
10	Belgium (BEL)	5	6	2	13
11	Australia (AUS)	4	9	3	16
12	Finland (FIN)	4	5	3	12
12	Sweden (SWE)	4	5	3	12
14	Rhodesia (RHO)	4	0	0	4
15	Norway (NOR)	3	3	3	9
16	Austria (AUT)	3	2	1	6
16	Iran (IRI)	3	2	1	6
18	Germany (GER)	3	1	3	7
19	Canada (CAN)	3	0	2	5
20	Netherlands (NED)	2	9	3	14
21	Poland (POL)	2	4	4	10
22	Switzerland (SUI)	2	3	4	9
23	Czech Republic (CZE)	2	2	2	6
24	Russia (RUS)	2	1	2	5
25	Denmark (DEN)	2	0	2	4
26	Ireland (IRL)	1	1	0	2
26	New Zealand (NZL)	1	1	0	2
28	Slovakia (SVK)	1	0	2	3
29	Turkey (TUR)	1	0	1	2
30	Mexico (MEX)	1	0	0	1
30	Mongolia (MGL)	1	0	0	1
30	Unified Team (EUN)	1	0	0	1
33	Spain (ESP)	0	2	1	3
34	Thailand (THA)	0	2	0	2
35	Malaysia (MAS)	0	1	0	1
35	Ukraine (UKR)	0	1	0	1
37	Chinese Taipei (TPE)	0	0	2	2
Totals (37 entries)		163	153	141	457

== Medalists ==
=== Defunct events ===
- List of defunct archery events
- Advanced metric round open (held between 1976 and 1984)
- Albion round open (held between 1964 and 1968)
- Columbia round open (held between 1960 and 1968)
- FITA round open (held between 1960 and 1988)
- Novice round open (held in 1976)
- Short metric round open (held in 1972 to 1984)
- St. Nicholas round open (held between 1960 and 1976)
- Windsor round open (held in 1960)

=== Men's events ===
==== Men's individual wheelchair 1 (W1) ====
Event	Gold	Silver	Bronze
1992 Barcelona	Koichi Minami; Japan	Richard Spizzirri; United States	Giampiero Mercandelli; Italy
1996 Atlanta	Ouk Soo Lee; South Korea	Jappie Walstra; Netherlands	Udo Wolf; Germany
2000 Sydney	Zdenek Sebek; Czech Republic	Olivier Hatem; France	Dejan Miladinovic; France
2004 Athens	John Cavanagh; Great Britain	Anders Groenberg; Sweden	Jeffrey Fabry; United States
2008 Beijing	David Drahonisky; Czech Republic	John Cavanagh; Great Britain	Jeffrey Fabry; United States

==== Men's individual wheelchair 2 (W2) ====
Event	Gold	Silver	Bronze
1992 Barcelona	Orazio Pizzorni; Italy	Hermann Nortmann; Germany	Udo Wolf; Germany
1996 Atlanta	Martti Rantavouri; Finland	Kurt MacCaferri; Switzerland	Koichi Minami; Japan
2000 Sydney	Hong Gu Lee; South Korea	Young Joo Jung; South Korea	Oscar De Pellegrin; Italy
2004 Athens	Mario Oehme; Germany	Young Joo Jung; South Korea	Hong Gu Lee; South Korea
2008 Beijing	Cheng Changjie; China	Marco Vitale; Italy	Tseng Lung-Hui; Chinese Taipei

==== Men's individual open (standing) ====
Event	Gold	Silver	Bronze
1992 Barcelona	Jens Fudge; Denmark	Kenichi Nishii; Japan	Hyun Kwan Cho; South Korea
1996 Atlanta	Ryszard Olejnik; Poland	Jean-François Garcia; France	Tae Sung An; South Korea
2000 Sydney	Tae Sung An; South Korea	Serhiy Atamanenko; Ukraine	Imrich Lycosa; Slovakia
2004 Athens	Imrich Lycosa; Slovakia	Tomasz Lezanski; Poland	Tae Sung An; South Korea
2008 Beijing	Baatarjav Dambadondog; Mongolia	Fabrice Meunier; France	Chen Yegang; China

==== Men's wheelchair team (W1/2) ====
Event	Gold	Silver	Bronze
1992 Barcelona	Germany (GER)	Italy (ITA)	South Korea (KOR)
1996 Atlanta	Germany (GER)	Italy (ITA)	South Korea (KOR)
2000 Sydney	Italy (ITA)	France (FRA)	South Korea (KOR)
2004 Athens	South Korea (KOR)	Japan (JPN)	United States (USA)
2008 Beijing	South Korea (KOR)	China (CHN)	Italy (ITA)

==== Men's teams open (standing) ====
Event	Gold	Silver	Bronze
1992 Barcelona	South Korea (KOR)	Spain (ESP)	France (FRA)
1996 Atlanta	South Korea (KOR)	Poland (POL)	Japan (JPN)

=== Women's events ===
==== Women's wheelchair (W1/2) ====
Event	Gold	Silver	Bronze
1992 Barcelona	Paola Fantato; Italy	Elli Korva; Finland	Hifumi Suzuki; Japan
1996 Atlanta	Hifumi Suzuki; Japan	Sandra Truccolo; Italy	Paola Fantato; Italy
2000 Sydney	Paola Fantato; Italy	Kathleen Smith; Great Britain	Hee Sook Ko; South Korea
2004 Athens	Paola Fantato; Italy	Naomi Isozaki; Japan	Nako Hirasawa; Japan

==== Women's individual open (standing) ====
Event	Gold	Silver	Bronze
1992 Barcelona	Tatiana Grishko; Unified Team	Siv Thulin; Sweden	Hanne Tved; Denmark
1996 Atlanta	Małgorzata Olejnik; Poland	Anita Chapman; Great Britain	Marie-Francoise Hybois; France
2000 Sydney	Anita Chapman; Great Britain	Małgorzata Olejnik; Poland	Malgorzata Korzeniowska; Poland
2004 Athens	Yanhong Wang; China	Wasana Karpmaichan; Thailand	Małgorzata Olejnik; Poland

==== Women's teams open (W1/2) ====
Event	Gold	Silver	Bronze
1996 Atlanta	Italy (ITA)	Japan (JPN)	Great Britain (GBR)
2000 Sydney	Italy (ITA)	Great Britain (GBR)	Japan (JPN)
2004 Athens	Great Britain (GBR)	Italy (ITA)	South Korea (KOR)
