= Canada at the 2015 Parapan American Games =

- Flag of Canada
- IPC code: CAN
- NPC: Canadian Paralympic Committee
- Website: http://www.paralympic.ca/

in Toronto, Canada August 7, 2015 – August 15, 2015
- Competitors: 216 in 14 sports
- Flag bearer (opening): Marco Dispaltro
- Flag bearer (closing): Zak Madell
- Medals Ranked 2nd: Gold 50 Silver 63 Bronze 55 Total 168

Parapan American Games appearances (overview)
- 1999; 2003; 2007; 2011; 2015; 2019; 2023

Canada participated in the 2015 Parapan American Games held at home in Toronto, Canada, from August 7 to 15, 2015.

== Competitors ==
The following table lists Canada's delegation per sport and gender.

| Sport | Men | Women | Total |
|---|---|---|---|
| Archery | 3 | 1 | 4 |
| Athletics | 24 | 10 | 34 |
| Boccia | 7 | 3 | 10 |
| Cycling | 10 | 10 | 20 |
| Football 7-a-side | 14 | 0 | 14 |
| Goalball | 6 | 6 | 12 |
| Judo | 3 | 1 | 4 |
| Powerlifting | 1 | 0 | 1 |
| Sitting volleyball | 11 | 10 | 21 |
| Swimming | 24 | 16 | 40 |
| Table tennis | 9 | 1 | 10 |
| Wheelchair basketball | 12 | 12 | 24 |
| Wheelchair rugby | 11 | 0 | 11 |
| Wheelchair tennis | 2 | 2 | 4 |
| Total | 134 | 71 | 205 |

== Medalists ==
| Medal | Name | Sport | Event | Date |
|---|---|---|---|---|
| Gold | Mark Ledo | Cycling | Men's Road Race H3-5 | August 8 |
| Gold | Eric Bussiere; Bruno Garneau; Paul Gauthier | Boccia | Pairs BC3 | August 8 |
| Gold | Nicolas Turbide | Swimming | Men's 200m IM SM13(SM12-13) | August 8 |
| Gold | James Leroux | Swimming | Men's 100m Breaststroke SB9 | August 9 |
| Gold | Morgan Bird | Swimming | Women's 400m Freestyle S8(S7-8) | August 9 |
| Gold | Nicolas Turbide | Swimming | Men's 100m Backstroke S13(S12-13) | August 9 |
| Gold | Zack Mcallister | Swimming | Men's 50m Freestyle S8 | August 9 |
| Gold | Morgan Bird | Swimming | Women's 50m Freestyle S8 | August 9 |
| Gold | Stephanie Chan | Table Tennis | Women's Singles Class 6-7 | August 10 |
| Gold | Gordie Michie | Swimming | Men's 100m Backstroke S14 | August 10 |
| Gold | Aurelie Rivard | Swimming | Women's 100m Butterfly S10(S8-10) | August 10 |
| Gold | Tess Routliffe | Swimming | Women's 50m Freestyle S7 | August 10 |
| Gold | Jason Dunkerley | Athletics | Men's 5000m T11 | August 10 |
| Gold | Diane Roy | Athletics | Women's 800m T54 | August 10 |
| Gold | Daniel Chalifour; Alexandre Cloutier | Cycling | Mixed Time Trial B | August 11 |
| Gold | Brent Lakatos | Athletics | Men's 100m T53 | August 10 |
| Gold | Josh Farrell | Athletics | Men's Shot Put F20 | August 10 |
| Gold | Aurelie Rivard | Swimming | Women's 50m Freestyle S10 | August 10 |
| Gold | Kevin Strybosch | Athletics | Men's Discus Throw F37 | August 10 |
| Gold | Becky Richter | Athletics | Women's Club Throw F31/32/51 | August 10 |
| Gold | Michelle Stilwell | Athletics | Women's 100m T52 | August 11 |
| Gold | Daniel Chalifour; Alexandre Cloutier | Cycling | Mixed Individual Pursuit B | August 11 |
| Gold | Benoît Huot | Swimming | Men's 400m Freestyle S10 | August 11 |
| Gold | Katarina Roxon | Swimming | Women's 100m Breaststroke SB8 | August 11 |
| Gold | Katarina Roxon | Swimming | Women's 400m Freestyle S10 | August 11 |
| Gold | Guillaume Ouellet | Athletics | Men's 1500m T13 | August 12 |
| Gold | Mitchell Chase | Athletics | Men's 1500m T38 | August 12 |
| Gold | Alexandre Dupont | Athletics | Men's 400m T54 | August 12 |
| Gold | Jason Roberts | Athletics | Men's Shot Put F32/33/34 | August 12 |
| Gold | Renee Foessel | Athletics | Women's Discus Throw F37/38/44 | August 12 |
| Gold | Jennifer Brown | Athletics | Women's Shot Put F20/37/38 | August 12 |
| Gold | Pamela Legean | Athletics | Women's Shot Put F53/54/55 | August 12 |
| Gold | Devin Gotell | Swimming | Men's 400m Freestyle S13(S11-13) | August 12 |
| Gold | Justine Morrier | Swimming | Women's 100m Breaststroke SB14 | August 12 |
| Gold | Tess Routliffe | Swimming | Women's 100m Breaststroke SB7 | August 12 |
| Gold | Tess Routliffe | Swimming | Women's 100m Freestyle S7 | August 12 |
| Gold | Aurelie Rivard | Swimming | Women's 200m IM SM10(SM9-10) | August 12 |
| Gold | Kyle Whitehouse | Athletics | Men's 200m T38 | August 13 |
| Gold | Brent Lakatos | Athletics | Men's 800m T53 | August 13 |
| Gold | Alexandre Dupont | Athletics | Men's 800m T54 | August 13 |
| Gold | Daniel Chalifour; Alexandre Cloutier | Cycling | Mixed Time Trial B | August 13 |
| Gold | Aurelie Rivard | Swimming | Women's 100m Backstroke S10 | August 13 |
| Gold | Sarah Mehain | Swimming | Women's 50m Butterfly S7(S6-7) | August 13 |
| Gold | Alexandre Dupont | Athletics | Men's 1500m T54 | August 14 |
| Gold | Brent Lakatos | Athletics | Men's 400m T53 | August 14 |
| Gold | Nicolas Turbide | Swimming | Men's 100m Butterfly S13(S11-13) | August 14 |
| Gold | Tess Routliffe | Swimming | Women's 100m Backstroke S7 | August 14 |
| Gold | Aurelie Rivard | Swimming | Women's 100m Freestyle S10 | August 14 |
| Gold | Justine Morrier | Swimming | Women's 200m IM SM14 | August 14 |
| Gold | Travis Murao; Jason Crone; Byron Green; Mike Whitehead; Cody Caldwell; Trevor Hirschfield; Fabien Lavoie; Patrice Dagenais; David Willsie; Patrice Simard; Zak Madell | Wheelchair rugby | Mixed Gender | August 14 |
| Silver | Daniel Chalifour; Alexandre Cloutier | Cycling | Mixed Road Race B | August 8 |
| Silver | Marco Dispaltro; Alison Levine; Caroline Vietnieks | Boccia | Pairs BC4 | August 8 |
| Silver | Maxime Rousselle | Swimming | Men's 200m Freestyle S14 | August 8 |
| Silver | Devin Gotell | Swimming | Men's 200m IM SM13(SM12-13) | August 8 |
| Silver | Camille Berube | Swimming | Women's 100m Backstroke S8 | August 8 |
| Silver | Kirstie Kasko | Swimming | Women's 200m Freestyle S14 | August 8 |
| Silver | Isaac Bouckley | Swimming | Men's 100m Breaststroke SB9 | August 9 |
| Silver | Zack Mcallister | Swimming | Men's 400m Freestyle S8 | August 9 |
| Silver | Aurelie Rivard | Swimming | Women's 100m Breaststroke SB9 | August 9 |
| Silver | Katarina Roxon | Swimming | Women's 400m Freestyle S9 | August 9 |
| Silver | Devin Gotell | Swimming | Men's 100m Backstroke S13(S12-13) | August 9 |
| Silver | Karen Van Nest | Archery | Compound Women's Open | August 10 |
| Silver | Nathan Stein | Swimming | Men's 100m Butterfly S10 | August 10 |
| Silver | Josh Cassidy | Athletics | Men's 5000m T54 | August 10 |
| Silver | Adam Rahier | Swimming | Men's 100m Backstroke S14 | August 10 |
| Silver | Tyler Mrak | Swimming | Men's 100m Breaststroke SB13(12–13) | August 10 |
| Silver | Jean-Michel Lavallière | Swimming | Men's 50m Freestyle S7 | August 10 |
| Silver | Kirstie Kasko | Swimming | Women's 100m Backstroke S14 | August 10 |
| Silver | Samantha Ryan | Swimming | Women's 100m Butterfly S10(S8-10) | August 10 |
| Silver | Sarah Mehain | Swimming | Women's 50m Freestyle S7 | August 10 |
| Silver | Katarina Roxon | Swimming | Women's 50m Freestyle S9 | August 10 |
| Silver | Kyle Whitehouse | Athletics | Men's 100m T38 | August 11 |
| Silver | Dustin Walsh | Athletics | Men's 400m T11 | August 11 |
| Silver | Hanif Mawji | Boccia | Individual BC1 | August 11 |
| Silver | Adam Dukovich | Boccia | Individual BC2 | August 11 |
| Silver | Eric Bussiere | Boccia | Individual BC3 | August 11 |
| Silver | Mike Semetz | Cycling | Men's Individual Pursuit C1-3 | August 11 |
| Silver | Jean-Michel Lavallière | Swimming | Men's 200m IM SM7 | August 11 |
| Silver | Isaac Bouckley | Swimming | Men's 400m Freestyle S10 | August 11 |
| Silver | Jonathan Dieleman | Swimming | Men's 50m Breaststroke SB3(SB1-3) | August 11 |
| Silver | Nicolas Turbide | Swimming | Men's 50m Freestyle S13 | August 11 |
| Silver | Jennifer Brown | Athletics | Women's Discus Throw F37/38/44 | August 12 |
| Silver | Renee Foessel | Athletics | Women's Shot Put F20/37/38 | August 12 |
| Silver | Priscilla Gagne | Judo | Women's -52 kg | August 12 |
| Silver | Jean-Michel Lavallière | Swimming | Men's 100m Freestyle S7 | August 12 |
| Silver | Benoît Huot | Swimming | Men's 200m IM | August 12 |
| Silver | Nicolas Turbide | Swimming | Men's 400m Freestyle S13(S11-13) | August 12 |
| Silver | Sarah Mehain | Swimming | Women's 100m Freestyle S7 | August 12 |
| Silver | Katarina Roxon | Swimming | Women's 200m IM SM10(SM9-10) | August 12 |
| Silver | Josh Cassidy | Athletics | Men's 1500m T54 | August 14 |
| Silver | Josh Cassidy | Athletics | Men's 800m T54 | August 13 |
| Silver | Ilana Dupont | Athletics | Women's 100m T53 | August 13 |
| Silver | Robbi Weldon; Audrey Lemieux | Cycling | Mixed Time Trial B | August 13 |
| Silver | Shelley Gautier | Cycling | Mixed Time Trial T1-2 | August 13 |
| Silver | Benoît Huot | Swimming | Men's 100m Backstroke S10(S9-10) | August 13 |
| Silver | Nicolas Turbide | Swimming | Men's 100m Freestyle S13 | August 13 |
| Silver | Zack Mcallister | Swimming | Men's 100m Freestyle S8 | August 13 |
| Silver | Alexander Elliot; Jean-Michel Lavallière; Zack Mcallister; Nathan Stein; Zach Zona; Adam Purdy; Nathan Clement | Swimming | Men's 4x100m Freestyle Relay 34pts | August 13 |
| Silver | Jean-Michel Lavallière | Swimming | Men's 50m Butterfly S7 | August 13 |
| Silver | Morgan Bird | Swimming | Women's 100m Freestyle S8 | August 13 |
| Silver | Curtis Caron; Ian Kent; Masoud Mojahed | Table Tennis | Men's Team Class 6-8 | August 13 |
| Silver | Jason Dunkerley | Athletics | Men's 1500m T11 | August 14 |
| Silver | Josh Cassidy | Athletics | Men's 1500m T54 | August 14 |
| Silver | Leah Ainslie Robinson | Athletics | Women's 400m T38 | August 14 |
| Silver | Ness Murby | Athletics | Women's Javelin Throw F11/12 | August 14 |
| Silver | Adam Purdy | Swimming | Men's 100m Backstroke S6 | August 14 |
| Silver | Gordie Michie | Swimming | Men's 200m IM SM14 | August 14 |
| Silver | Benoît Huot; James Leroux; Zack Mcallister; Adam Purdy; Zach Zona; Jean-Michel Lavallière; Alexander Elliot; Nathan Clement | Swimming | Men's 4x100m Medley Relay 34pts | August 14 |
| Silver | Sarah Mehain | Swimming | Women's 100m Backstroke S7 | August 14 |
| Silver | Tammy Cunnington | Swimming | Women's 200m Freestyle S4(S1-4) | August 14 |
| Silver | Kirstie Kasko | Swimming | Women's 200m IM SM14 | August 14 |
| Silver | Elaine Allard; Janet McLachlan; Arinn Young; Cindy Ouellet; Rosalie Lalonde; Maude Jaques; Katie Harnock; Darda Sales; Tracey Ferguson; Jamey Jewells; Erica Gavel; Melanie Hawtin | Wheelchair Basketball | Women's Team | August 14 |
| Silver | Deion Green; Peter Won; Bo Hedges; Vincent Dallaire; Liam Hickey; Adam Lancia; Abdi Dini; Chad Jassman; Nikola Goncin; Jonathan Vermette; Tyler Miller; David Eng | Wheelchair Basketball | Men's Team | August 15 |
| Bronze | Charles Moreau | Cycling | Men's Road Race H3-5 | August 8 |
| Bronze | Nicole Clermont | Cycling | Women's Road Race C1-5 | August 8 |
| Bronze | Robert Labbe | Cycling | Mixed Road Race H1-2M/H1-5W | August 8 |
| Bronze | Louis-Albert Corriveau-Jolin | Cycling | Mixed Road Race T1-2 | August 8 |
| Bronze | Chris Halpen; Hanif Mawji; Adam Dukovich; Tammy McLeod | Boccia | Team BC1/BC2 | August 8 |
| Bronze | Gordie Michie | Swimming | Men's 200m Freestyle S14 | August 8 |
| Bronze | Tammy Cunnington | Swimming | Women's 100m Freestyle S4(S1-4) | August 8 |
| Bronze | Alexander Elliot | Swimming | Men's 100m Breaststroke SB9 | August 9 |
| Bronze | Tyler Mrak | Swimming | Men's 100m Backstroke S13(S12-13) | August 9 |
| Bronze | Zach Zona | Swimming | Men's 400m Freestyle S8 | August 9 |
| Bronze | Christopher Sergeant | Swimming | Men's 50m Freestyle S8 | August 9 |
| Bronze | Sarah Girard | Swimming | Women's 100m Breaststroke SB9 | August 9 |
| Bronze | Sabrina Duchesne | Swimming | Women's 400m Freestyle S8(S7-8) | August 9 |
| Bronze | Andrew Cooke; Tammy Cunnington; Jonathan Dieleman; Valerie Drapeau; Danial Murphy; Adam Purdy | Swimming | Mixed 4x50m Freestyle Relay 20pts | August 9 |
| Bronze | Alexander Elliot | Swimming | Men's 100m Butterfly S10 | August 9 |
| Bronze | Jean-Philippe Maranda | Athletics | Men's 100m T53 | August 10 |
| Bronze | Zach Zona | Swimming | Men's 100m Butterfly S8 | August 10 |
| Bronze | Nathan Stein | Swimming | Men's 50m Freestyle S10 | August 10 |
| Bronze | Justine Morrier | Swimming | Women's 100m Backstroke S14 | August 10 |
| Bronze | Ian Kent | Table Tennis | Men's Singles Class 8 | August 10 |
| Bronze | Kenneth Trudgeon | Athletics | Men's Shot Put F46 | August 11 |
| Bronze | Diane Roy | Athletics | Women's 400m T54 | August 11 |
| Bronze | Becky Richter | Athletics | Women's Discus Throw F51/52 | August 11 |
| Bronze | Renee Foessel | Athletics | Women's Javelin Throw F37/38 | August 11 |
| Bronze | Zach Zona | Swimming | Men's 200m IM SM8 | August 11 |
| Bronze | Alexander Elliot | Swimming | Men's 400m Freestyle S10 | August 11 |
| Bronze | Camille Berube | Swimming | Women's 200m IM SM8(SM7-8) | August 11 |
| Bronze | Kenneth Trudgeon | Athletics | Men's Discus Throw F46 | August 12 |
| Bronze | Kyle Pettey | Athletics | Men's Shot Put F32/33/34 | August 12 |
| Bronze | Leah Ainslie Robinson | Athletics | Women's 200m T37 | August 12 |
| Bronze | Ness Murby | Athletics | Women's Discus Throw F11/12 | August 12 |
| Bronze | Gordie Michie | Swimming | Men's 100m Breaststroke SB14 | August 12 |
| Bronze | Alexander Elliot | Swimming | Men's 200m IM SM10 | August 12 |
| Bronze | Tyler Mrak | Swimming | Men's 400m Freestyle S13(S11-13) | August 12 |
| Bronze | Kirstie Kasko | Swimming | Women's 100m Breaststroke SB14 | August 12 |
| Bronze | Camille Berube | Swimming | Women's 100m Breaststroke SB7 | August 12 |
| Bronze | Jessica Frotten | Athletics | Women's 100m T53 | August 13 |
| Bronze | Ilana Dupont | Athletics | Women's 800m T53 | August 13 |
| Bronze | Shawna Ryan; Joanie Caron | Cycling | Mixed Time Trial B | August 13 |
| Bronze | Charles Moreau | Cycling | Mixed Time Trial H1-5 | August 13 |
| Silver | Alex Radoman | Judo | Men's -81 kg | August 13 |
| Bronze | Alexander Elliot | Swimming | Men's 100m Backstroke S10(S9-10) | August 13 |
| Bronze | Adam Purdy | Swimming | Men's 50m Butterfly S6 | August 13 |
| Bronze | Nathan Clement | Swimming | Men's 50m Butterfly S7 | August 13 |
| Bronze | Katarina Roxon | Swimming | Women's 100m Backstroke S9 | August 13 |
| Bronze | Philippe Bedard; Joel Dembe | Wheelchair Tennis | Men's Doubles | August 13 |
| Bronze | Jessica Frotten | Athletics | Women's 400m T53 | August 14 |
| Bronze | Pamela Lejean | Athletics | Women's Javelin Throw F53/54 | August 14 |
| Bronze | Ashlie Andrews; Whitney Bogart; Tiana Knight; Jill Macsween; Nancy Morin; Cassie Orgeles | Goalball | Women's Team | August 14 |
| Bronze | Jesse Ward; Austin Hinchey; Larry Matthews; Jason Naval; Doug Learoyd; Andrew Tucker; José Ebelo; Jamoi Anderson; Ray Gauthier; Dave Marchand; Jesse G. Buckingham | Sitting Volleyball | Men's Team | August 14 |
| Bronze | Tessa Popoff; Angelena Dolezar; Shacarra Orr; Chantal Beauchesne; Anne Fergusson; Jolan Wong; Heidi Peters; Amber Skypran; Kate Wright; Felicia Shafiq | Sitting Volleyball | Women's Team | August 14 |
| Bronze | Nathan Stein | Swimming | Men's 100m Freestyle S10 | August 14 |
| Bronze | Adam Rahier | Swimming | Men's 200m IM SM14 | August 14 |
| Bronze | Katarina Roxon | Swimming | Women's 100m Freestyle S9 | August 14 |
| Bronze | Brendan Gaulin; Aron Ghebreyohannes; Bruno Hache; Blair Nesbitt; Simon Richard; Ahmad Zeividavi | Goalball | Men's Team | August 14 |

== Archery ==
Men

- Alec Denys
- Kevin Evans
- Robert Hudson

Women

- Karen Van Nest

== Athletics ==
- Ben Brown
- Jennifer Brown
- Josh Cassidy
- Mitchell Chase
- Isaiah Christophe
- Earle Connor
- Braedon Dolfo
- Jason Dunkerley
- Alexandre Dupont
- Ilana Dupont
- Josh Farrell
- Renee Foessel
- Jessica Frotten
- Holden Gill
- Brent Lakatos
- Pamela LeJean
- Jean-Philippe Maranda
- Alister McQueen
- Vanessa Murby
- Guillaume Ouellet
- Kyle Pettey
- George Quarcoo
- Becky Richter
- Jason Roberts
- Leah Robinson
- Diane Roy
- Cody Salomons
- Tristan Smyth
- Basile Soulama
- Michelle Stilwell
- Kevin Strybosch
- Kenneth Trudgeon
- Wes Vick
- Dustin Walsh
- Kyle Whitehouse
- Adam Johnson (Guide)
- Joshua Karanja (Guide)
- Dylan Williamson (Guide)

== Boccia ==
- Eric Bussiere
- Marco Dispaltro
- Adam Dukovich
- Bruno Garneau
- Paul Gauthier
- Chris Halpen
- Alison Levine
- Hanif Mawji
- Tammy McLeod
- Caroline Vietnieks
- Ginette Beliveau (Guide)
- Kelly Halpen (Guide)
- Francine Hébert (Guide)
- Hussein Mawji (Guide)
- Shiela Soroten (Guide)

== Cycling ==
- Daniel Chalifour
- Nicole Clermont
- Louis-Albert Corriveau-Jolin
- Marie-Eve Croteau
- Shelley Gautier
- Robert Labbe
- Mark Ledo
- Marie-Claude Molnar
- Charles Moreau
- Shawna Ryan
- Michael Sametz
- Robbi Weldon
- Ross Wilson
- Joanie Caron (Guide)
- Alexandre Cloutier (Guide)
- Audrey Lemieux (Guide)

== Football 7-a-side ==
- Matthew Brown
- Lucas Bruno
- Sam Charron
- Matt Gilbert
- Nicholas Heffernan
- Dustin Hodgson
- Cory Johnson
- Kyle Payne
- John Phillips
- Vito Proietti
- Joseph Resendes
- Liam Stanley
- Trevor Stiles
- Damien Wojtiw

== Goalball ==
Men

- Brendan Gaulin
- Aron Ghebreyohannes
- Bruno Hache
- Blair Nesbitt
- Simon Richard
- Ahmad Zeividavi

| Team | Pld | W | D | L | GF | GA | GD | Pts | Qualification |
|---|---|---|---|---|---|---|---|---|---|
| Brazil | 5 | 5 | 0 | 0 | 52 | 10 | +42 | 15 | Qualified for the semifinals |
| Canada | 5 | 4 | 0 | 1 | 36 | 20 | +16 | 12 | Qualified for the semifinals |
| United States | 5 | 3 | 0 | 2 | 40 | 27 | +13 | 9 | Qualified for the semifinals |
| Argentina | 5 | 2 | 0 | 3 | 44 | 35 | +9 | 6 | Qualified for the semifinals |
| Venezuela | 5 | 1 | 0 | 4 | 23 | 53 | −30 | 3 | |
| Puerto Rico | 5 | 0 | 0 | 5 | 4 | 54 | −50 | 0 | |

Source: results.toronto2015.org

| Team | Semifinals | Bronze Medal Round | Rank |
| Team | Opposition Result | Opposition Result | Rank |
|---|---|---|---|
| Canada | United States L 2–3 | Argentina W 13–3 | 3rd place, bronze medalist(s) |

Women

- Ashlie Andrews
- Whitney Bogart
- Tiana Knight
- Jillian MacSween
- Nancy Morin
- Cassandra Orgeles

| Team | Pld | W | D | L | GF | GA | GD | Pts | Qualification |
|---|---|---|---|---|---|---|---|---|---|
| Brazil | 5 | 5 | 0 | 0 | 36 | 2 | +34 | 15 | Qualified for the semifinals |
| United States | 5 | 4 | 0 | 1 | 36 | 5 | +31 | 12 | Qualified for the semifinals |
| Canada | 5 | 3 | 0 | 2 | 33 | 8 | +25 | 9 | Qualified for the semifinals |
| Guatemala | 5 | 2 | 0 | 3 | 19 | 36 | −17 | 6 | Qualified for the semifinals |
| Nicaragua | 5 | 1 | 0 | 4 | 15 | 44 | −29 | 3 | |
| El Salvador | 5 | 0 | 0 | 5 | 6 | 50 | −44 | 0 | |

Source: results.toronto2015.org

| Team | Semifinals | Bronze Medal Round | Rank |
| Team | Opposition Result | Opposition Result | Rank |
|---|---|---|---|
| Canada | United States L 6–7 | Guatemala W 11–1 | 3rd place, bronze medalist(s) |

== Judo ==
- Priscilla Gagné
- Justin Karn
- Alexander Radoman
- Tony Walby

== Powerlifting ==
Men

| Athlete | Event | Result | Rank |
|---|---|---|---|
| Dylan Sparks | −59 kg | 80.0 | 7 |

== Sitting volleyball ==
Men

- Jamoi Anderson
- Jesse Buckingham
- Raymond Gauthier
- Austin Hinchey
- Douglas Learoyd
- David Marchand
- Larry Matthews
- Jason Naval
- José Rebelo
- Andrew Tucker
- Jesse Ward

Women

- Chantal Beauchesne
- Angelena Dolezar
- Anne Fergusson
- Shacarra Orr
- Heidi Peters
- Tessa Popoff
- Amber Skyrpan
- Jolan Wong
- Katelyn Wright

== Swimming ==
- Camille Berube
- Morgan Bird
- Dalton Boon
- Isaac Bouckley
- Nathan Clement
- Andrew Cooke
- Tammy Cunnington
- Christian Daniel
- Jonathan Dieleman
- Valerie Drapeau
- Sabrina Duchesne
- Alexander Elliot
- Sarah Girard
- Devin Gotell
- Benoit Huot
- Kirstie Kasko
- Nydia Langill
- Jean-Michel Lavallière
- James Leroux
- Sarah Mailhot
- Zachary McAllister
- Riley McLean
- Sarah Mehain
- Gordie Michie
- Justine Morrier
- Tyler Mrak
- Danial Murphy
- Scott Patterson
- Adam Purdy
- Adam Rahier
- Aurelie Rivard
- Maxime Rousselle
- Tess Routliffe
- Katarina Roxon
- Samantha Ryan
- Christopher Sergeant-Tsonos
- Nathan Stein
- Abi Tripp
- Nicolas Turbide
- Zachary Zona

== Table tennis ==
- Curtis Caron
- Stephanie Chan
- Mikhail Drozdowski
- Steven Dunn
- Ian Kent
- Masoud Mojtahed
- Muhammad Mudassar
- Asad Murtaza
- Martin Pelletier
- Asad Syed

== Wheelchair basketball ==
Men

- Vincent Dallaire
- Abdi Dini
- David Eng
- Nikola Goncin
- Deion Green
- Bo Hedges
- Liam Hickey
- Chad Jassman
- Adam Lancia
- Tyler Miller
- Jonathan Vermette
- Peter Won

Women

- Elaine Allard
- Tracey Ferguson
- Erica Gavel
- Katie Harnock
- Melanie Hawtin
- Maude Jacques
- Jamey Jewells
- Rosalie Lalonde
- Janet McLachlan
- Cindy Ouellet
- Darda Sales
- Arinn Young

Pool A
| Team | Pld | W | L | PF | PA | PD | Pts | Qualification |
|---|---|---|---|---|---|---|---|---|
| Canada | 3 | 3 | 0 | 240 | 108 | +132 | 6 | Qualified for the semifinals |
| Brazil | 3 | 2 | 1 | 175 | 140 | +35 | 5 | Qualified for the semifinals |
| Mexico | 3 | 1 | 2 | 143 | 171 | −28 | 4 | |
| Guatemala | 3 | 0 | 3 | 78 | 217 | −139 | 3 | |

| Team | Semifinals | Gold Medal Round | Rank |
| Team | Opposition Result | Opposition Result | Rank |
|---|---|---|---|
| Canada | Guatemala W 82–28 | United States L 72–80 | 2nd place, silver medalist(s) |

== Wheelchair rugby ==
- Miranda Biletski
- Cody Caldwell
- Jason Crone
- Patrice Dagenais
- Byron Green
- Trevor Hirschfield
- Fabien Lavoie
- Zach Madell
- Travis Murao
- Patrice Simard
- Michael Whitehead
- David Willsie

== Wheelchair tennis ==
- Philippe Bedard
- Yuka Chokyu
- Joel Dembe
- Mika Ishikawa

== See also ==
- Canada at the 2016 Summer Paralympics
- Canada at the 2015 Pan American Games
