= Archery at the 1984 Summer Paralympics – Men's double short metric round paraplegic =

Men's double short metric round paraplegic at the VII Paralympic Games
- Paralympic Archery
- Competitors: 7 from 10 nations

Medalists
1st place, gold medalist(s)		Michel Baudois	Switzerland
2nd place, silver medalist(s)		H. S. Kin	South Korea
3rd place, bronze medalist(s)		Pasquale de Masi	Italy

The Men's double short round paraplegic was an archery competition at the 1984 Summer Paralympics.

The Swiss archer Michel Baudois won the gold medal.

== Results ==
Rank	Athlete	Points
1st place, gold medalist(s)	Michel Baudois (SUI)	1206
2nd place, silver medalist(s)	H. S. Kim (KOR)	1171
3rd place, bronze medalist(s)	Pasquale de Masi (ITA)	1164
4	S. Soda (JPN)	1164
5	J. Y. Koo (KOR)	1160
6	J. Aratto (FRA)	1153
7	Alec Denys (CAN)	1131
8	P. Pages (FRA)	1115
9	J. Thion (FRA)	1048
10	J. de Loera (MEX)	805
