= South Korea at the 1976 Summer Paralympics =

- IPC code: KOR
- NPC: Korean Paralympic Committee
- Website: www.kosad.or.kr (in Korean)

in Toronto
- Competitors: 9 in 4 sports
- Medals Ranked 27th: Gold 1 Silver 2 Bronze 1 Total 4

Summer Paralympics appearances (overview)
- 1968; 1972; 1976; 1980; 1984; 1988; 1992; 1996; 2000; 2004; 2008; 2012; 2016; 2020; 2024

South Korea competed at the 1976 Summer Paralympics in Toronto, Ontario, Canada.

== Medalists ==
Medal	Name	Sport	Event
Gold	Choi Tae-Am	Table tennis	Men's Singles 2
Silver	Kim Yoon-Bae	Archery	Men's Short metric round open
Silver	Choi Tae-Am; Kim Young-Tae; Ko Gun-Hong	Table tennis	Men's Teams 2
Bronze	Son Kum-Du	Table tennis	Men's Singles 2

== Archery ==
Athlete	Event	Final	
Athlete	Event	Points	Rank
Kim Yoon-Bae	Men's Short metric round open	596	2nd place, silver medalist(s)
Tu Sung-Kou	Men's Short metric round open	520	7

== Athletics ==
Athlete	Event	Heats		Final	
Athlete	Event	Result	Rank	Result	Rank
Kim So-Boo	Men's Precision javelin throw 1C-5	n/a		60	38

== Dartchery ==
Athlete	Event	Final	
Athlete	Event	Victories	Rank
Kim Yoon-Bae; Tu Sung-Kou	Mixed pairs open	0	15

== Table tennis ==
- Men's Singles 1C — Kim Young-Tae (7th)
- Men's Singles 2 — Choi Tae-Am ( (gold) )
- Men's Singles 2 — Ko Gun-Hong (36th)
- Men's Singles 3 — Son Kum-Du ( (bronze) )
- Men's Singles 4-5 — Kim So-Boo (7th)
- Men's Teams 2 — Choi Tae-Am, Kim Young-Tae, Ko Gun-Hong ( (silver) )
- Men's Teams 4-5 — Kim So-Boo, Son Kum-Du (7th)
