= Archery at the 2000 Summer Paralympics – Men's individual W2 =

Men's individual W2 at the XI Paralympic Games
- Venue: Sydney, Australia
- Dates: 20 to 25 October 2000

Medalists
1st place, gold medalist(s)		Lee Hong Gu	South Korea
2nd place, silver medalist(s)		Jung Young Joo	South Korea
3rd place, bronze medalist(s)		Oscar De Pellegrin	Italy

The men's individual W2 archery event was held from 20 to 25 October 2000 in Sydney, Australia.

== Ranking round ==
Rank	Competitor	Points	Notes
1	Lee Hong Gu (KOR)	636	
2	Lee Ouk Soo (KOR)	617	
3	Giuseppe Gabelli (ITA)	613	
4	Oscar De Pellegrin (ITA)	610	
5	Roman Hutnyk (UKR)	606	
6	Wim Nales (NED)	605	
7	Jung Young Joo (KOR)	604	
8	Alec Denys (CAN)	602	
9	Jiri Klich (CZE)	602	
10	Sandy Gregory (GBR)	601	
11	Charles Est (FRA)	598	
12	Ping Sun Wong (HKG)	594	
13	Manuel Candela (ESP)	593	
14	James Buchanan (GBR)	590	
15	John Marshall (AUS)	583	
16	Ebrahim Ranjbarkivaj (IRI)	576	
17	Robert Anderson (GBR)	574	
18	Hermann Nortmann (GER)	573	
19	Arthur Fisk (AUS)	572	
20	Salvatore Carrubba (ITA)	563	
21	Majid Kehtari (IRI)	563	
22	Vincent Turchi (FRA)	557	
23	Norbert Murphy (CAN)	555	
24	Frantisek Velcic (SVK)	552	
25	Jappie Walstra (NED)	548	
26	Toshikatsu Iljima (JPN)	545	
27	Pertti Pulkkinen (FIN)	543	
28	Miroslav Kacina (SVK)	539	
29	Tak Fai Lai (HKG)	535	
30	Roger Eriksson (SWE)	498	
31	Tam Chi Ming (HKG)	494	
32	Keijo Kallunki (FIN)	202	

== Competition bracket ==
Round of 32
Keijo Kallunki (FIN)	105
Lee Hong Gu (KOR)	170
Robert Anderson (GBR)	145
Ebrahim Ranjbarkivaj (IRI)	148
Jappie Walstra (NED)	134
Alec Denys (CAN)	156
Frantisek Velcic (SVK)	127
Jiri Klich (CZE)	154
Miroslav Kacina (SVK)	132
Roman Hutnyk (UKR)	147
Majid Kehtari (IRI)	137
Ping Sun Wong (HKG)	143
Tak Fai Lai (HKG)	137
Oscar De Pellegrin (ITA)	150
Salvatore Carrubba (ITA)	145
Manuel Candela (ESP)	156
Roger Eriksson (SWE)	122
Giuseppe Gabelli (ITA)	158
Arthur Fisk (AUS)
James Buchanan (GBR)	150
Pertti Pulkkinen (FIN)	152
Wim Nales (NED)	139
Vincent Turchi (FRA)	138
Charles Est (FRA)	151
Toshikatsu Iljima (JPN)	149
Jung Young Joo (KOR)	156
Norbert Murphy (CAN)	134 (5)
Sandy Gregory (GBR)	134 (8)
Tam Chi Ming (HKG)	117
Lee Ouk Soo (KOR)	152
Hermann Nortmann (GER)	130
John Marshall (AUS)	138

Round of 16
Lee Hong Gu (KOR)	156
Ebrahim Ranjbarkivaj (IRI)	139
Alec Denys (CAN)	148
Jiri Klich (CZE)	141
Roman Hutnyk (UKR)	161
Ping Sun Wong (HKG)	148
Oscar De Pellegrin (ITA)	148
Manuel Candela (ESP)	125
Giuseppe Gabelli (ITA)	152
James Buchanan (GBR)	150
Pertti Pulkkinen (FIN)	152 (8)
Charles Est (FRA)	152 (9)
Jung Young Joo (KOR)	162
Sandy Gregory (GBR)	150
Lee Ouk Soo (KOR)	156
John Marshall (AUS)	147

Quarterfinals
Lee Hong Gu (KOR)	105
Alec Denys (CAN)	99
Roman Hutnyk (UKR)	95
Oscar De Pellegrin (ITA)	107
Giuseppe Gabelli (ITA)	93
Charles Est (FRA)	101
Jung Young Joo (KOR)	99
Lee Ouk Soo (KOR)	92

Semifinals
Lee Hong Gu (KOR)	113
Oscar De Pellegrin (ITA)	104
Charles Est (FRA)	99
Jung Young Joo (KOR)	106

Final
Lee Hong Gu (KOR)	113
Jung Young Joo (KOR)	103
Third place
Oscar De Pellegrin (ITA)	101
Charles Est (FRA)	99
