= Swimming at the 2015 Parapan American Games – Men's 50 metre freestyle S7 =

Men's 50 metre freestyle S7 at the 2015 Parapan American Games
- Venue: Toronto Pan Am Sports Centre
- Dates: 10 August 2015
- Competitors: 12 from 7 nations
- Winning time: 29.93

Medalists
| 1st place, gold medalist(s) | | Carlos Serrano Zárate | Colombia |
| 2nd place, silver medalist(s) | | Jean-Michel Lavallière | Canada |
| 3rd place, bronze medalist(s) | | Italo Gomes | Brazil |

The men's S7 50 metres freestyle competition of the swimming events at the 2015 Parapan American Games was held on August 12, 2015, at the Toronto Pan Am Sports Centre.

== Schedule ==
All times are Eastern Standard Time (UTC-5).

| Date | Time | Round |
|---|---|---|
| 10 August | 9:30 | Heats |
| 10 August | 17:57 | Final |

== Results ==
=== Heats ===
==== Heat 1 ====
| Rank | Lane | Name | Nationality | Time | Notes |
|---|---|---|---|---|---|
| 1 | 4 | Jean-Michel Lavallière | Canada | 31.52 | PR |
| 2 | 5 | Italo Gomes | Brazil | 32.54 | |
| 3 | 2 | Facundo Arregui | Argentina | 33.98 | |
| 4 | 6 | Fabiano De Toledo | Brazil | 34.23 | |
| 5 | 7 | Emmanuel Enrique Diaz | Honduras | 41.40 | |
| 6 | 3 | Ivan Esquivel | Mexico | DNS | |

==== Heat 2 ====
| Rank | Lane | Name | Nationality | Time | Notes |
|---|---|---|---|---|---|
| 1 | 4 | Carlos Serrano Zárate | Colombia | 30.42 | PR |
| 2 | 3 | Enrique Pérez | Mexico | 32.43 | |
| 3 | 6 | Nathan Clement | Canada | 33.22 | |
| 4 | 2 | Ronaldo Souza | Brazil | 34.79 | |
| 5 | 7 | Guillermo Marro | Argentina | 35.63 | |
| 6 | 5 | Lucas McCrory | United States | DNS | |

=== Final ===
| Rank | Lane | Name | Nationality | Time | Notes |
|---|---|---|---|---|---|
| 1st place, gold medalist(s) | 4 | Carlos Serrano Zárate | Colombia | 32.41 | PR |
| 2nd place, silver medalist(s) | 5 | Jean-Michel Lavallière | Canada | 34.94 | |
| 3rd place, bronze medalist(s) | 6 | Italo Gomes | Brazil | 38.52 | |
| 4 | 3 | Enrique Pérez | Mexico | 39.57 | |
| 5 | 2 | Nathan Clement | Canada | 42.15 | |
| 6 | 7 | Facundo Arregui | Argentina | 42.30 | |
| 7 | 1 | Fabiano De Toledo | Brazil | 44.08 | |
| 8 | 8 | Ronaldo Souza | Brazil | 46.15 | |
