= Athletics at the 2015 Parapan American Games – Men's 100 metres T53 =

Athletics – Men's 100 metres T53 at the 2015 Parapan American Games
- Venue: CIBC Athletics Stadium
- Dates: August 10
- Competitors: 8 from 5 nations

Medalists
| 1st place, gold medalist(s) | | Brent Lakatos | Canada |
| 2nd place, silver medalist(s) | | Ariovaldo Fernandes da Silva | Brazil |
| 3rd place, bronze medalist(s) | | Jean-Philippe Maranda | Canada |

The men's T53 100 metres competition of the athletics events at the 2015 Parapan American Games was held on August 10 at the CIBC Athletics Stadium. The defending Parapan American Games champion was Ariosvaldo Fernandes Silva of Brazil.

== Records ==
Prior to this competition, the existing world and Americas records were as follows:

| World record | Brent Lakatos (CAN) | 14.17 | Nottwil, Switzerland | 17 May 2014 |
| Americas Record | Brent Lakatos (CAN) | 14.17 | Nottwil, Switzerland | 17 May 2014 |
| Parapan Am Record | Ariosvaldo Fernandes Silva (BRA) | 15.08 | Guadalajara, Mexico | 15 November 2011 |

== Schedule ==
All times are Central Standard Time (UTC-6).

| Date | Time | Round |
|---|---|---|
| 10 August | 19:12 | Final |

== Results ==
All times are shown in seconds.

| KEY: | q | Fastest non-qualifiers | Q | Qualified | PR | Parapan American Games record | AR | Area record | NR | National record | PB | Personal best | SB | Seasonal best | DSQ | Disqualified | FS | False start |

=== Final ===
Wind -0.1 m/s

| Rank | Name | Nation | Time | Notes |
|---|---|---|---|---|
| 1st place, gold medalist(s) | Brent Lakatos | Canada | 15.11 | |
| 2nd place, silver medalist(s) | Ariosvaldo Fernandes da Silva | Brazil | 15.82 | |
| 3rd place, bronze medalist(s) | Jean-Philippe Maranda | Canada | 16.99 | |
| 4 | Ben Brown | Canada | 17.06 | |
| 5 | Jesus Aguilar | Venezuela | 17.70 | |
| 6 | Arturo Torres | United States | 18.97 | |
| 7 | Edisson Andres Martinez Sarmiento | Colombia | 20.28 | |
| 8 | Spencer Kimbro | United States | 22.24 | |
