= South Korea at the 1992 Winter Paralympics =

- IPC code: KOR
- NPC: Korean Paralympic Committee
- Website: www.kosad.or.kr (in Korean)

in Tignes-Albertville
- Competitors: 2
- Medals: Gold 0 Silver 0 Bronze 0 Total 0

Winter Paralympics appearances (overview)
- 1992; 1994; 1998; 2002; 2006; 2010; 2014; 2018; 2022; 2026

South Korea competed at the 1992 Winter Paralympics in Tignes/Albertville, France. Two competitors from South Korea won no medals and therefore did not place in the medal table.

== See also ==
- South Korea at the Paralympics
- South Korea at the 1992 Winter Olympics
