= South Korea at the 2010 Winter Paralympics =

- IPC code: KOR
- NPC: Korean Paralympic Committee
- Website: www.kosad.or.kr (in Korean)

in Vancouver
- Competitors: 25 in 5 sports
- Flag bearer: Han Min-Su
- Medals Ranked 18th: Gold 0 Silver 1 Bronze 0 Total 1

Winter Paralympics appearances (overview)
- 1992; 1994; 1998; 2002; 2006; 2010; 2014; 2018; 2022; 2026

The Republic of Korea (South Korea) competed, under the name Korea, at the 2010 Winter Paralympics in Vancouver.

== Alpine skiing ==
Men

Athlete	Event	Final					
Athlete	Event	Run 1	Run 2	Run 3	Total Time	Calculated Time	Rank
Sang-Min Han	Downhill sitting						
Sang-Min Han	Slalom sitting	52.58	1:04.0	n/a	1:53.60		11
Hwan-Kyung Lee	Slalom sitting	Did not finish					
Jong-Seork Park	Downhill sitting						
Jong-Seork Park	Slalom sitting	57.54	DSQ				

== Biathlon ==
Athlete	Events	Factor %	Qualification			Final		
Athlete	Events	Factor %	Missed shots	Finish time	Rank	Missed shots	Finish time	Rank
Hak-Su Im								

== Cross-country skiing ==
Athlete	Event	Final		
Athlete	Event	Time	Calculated Time	Rank
Hak-Su Im				
Vo-Ra-Mi Seo				

== Ice sledge hockey ==
South Korea competed in ice sledge hockey.

== Wheelchair curling ==
South Korea competed in wheelchair curling, placing second, which earned them a silver medal.

== See also ==
- South Korea at the 2010 Winter Olympics
- South Korea at the Paralympics
