= Swimming at the 2000 Summer Paralympics – Men's 200 metre individual medley SM6 =

Men's 200m individual medley SM6 at the XI Paralympic Games
- Paralympic Swimming
- Venue: Sydney International Aquatics Centre
- Dates: 20 October 2000

Medalists
| 1st place, gold medalist(s) | | Sascha Kindred | Great Britain |
| 2nd place, silver medalist(s) | | Tadhg Slattery | South Africa |
| 3rd place, bronze medalist(s) | | Thomas Grimm | Germany |

The men's 200 metre individual medley SM6 event took place on 20 October 2000 in Sydney, Australia.

== Results ==
=== Heat 1 ===
| Rank | Athlete | Time | Notes |
|---|---|---|---|
| 1 | Tadhg Slattery (RSA) | 3:03.44 | Q |
| 2 | Thomas Grimm (GER) | 3:03.83 | Q |
| 3 | Sebastian Xhrouet (BEL) | 3:17.38 | Q |
| 4 | Prajim Rieangsantiea (THA) | 3:33.07 | |
| | Swen Michaelis (GER) | | DQ |

=== Heat 2 ===
| Rank | Athlete | Time | Notes |
|---|---|---|---|
| 1 | Sascha Kindred (GBR) | 3:03.19 | Q |
| 2 | Li Peng (CHN) | 3:10.20 | Q |
| 3 | Adam Purdy (CAN) | 3:13.76 | Q |
| 4 | Adriano Gomes de Lima (BRA) | 3:17.03 | Q |
| 5 | Kasper Engel (NED) | 3:19.19 | Q |

=== Final ===
| Rank | Athlete | Time | Notes |
|---|---|---|---|
| 1st place, gold medalist(s) | Sascha Kindred (GBR) | 2:57.42 | WR |
| 2nd place, silver medalist(s) | Tadhg Slattery (RSA) | 2:59.37 | |
| 3rd place, bronze medalist(s) | Thomas Grimm (GER) | 3:02.79 | |
| 4 | Adam Purdy (CAN) | 3:10.34 | |
| 5 | Adriano Gomes de Lima (BRA) | 3:11.73 | |
| 6 | Li Peng (CHN) | 3:12.93 | |
| 7 | Sebastian Xhrouet (BEL) | 3:17.22 | |
| 8 | Kasper Engel (NED) | 3:17.73 | |
