= South Korea at the 2006 Winter Paralympics =

- IPC code: KOR
- NPC: Korean Paralympic Committee
- Website: www.kosad.or.kr (in Korean)

in Turin
- Competitors: 3 in 1 sport
- Medals Ranked 20th: Gold 0 Silver 0 Bronze 0 Total 0

Winter Paralympics appearances (overview)
- 1992; 1994; 1998; 2002; 2006; 2010; 2014; 2018; 2022; 2026

South Korea participated as Korea in the ninth Winter Paralympics in Turin, Italy.

Korea entered three athletes in the following sports:

- Alpine skiing: 3 male

== Medalists ==
	(gold)	(silver)	(bronze)	Total
South Korea	0	0	0	0

== See also ==
- 2006 Winter Paralympics
- South Korea at the 2006 Winter Olympics
