= Swimming at the 2015 Parapan American Games =

- Venue: CIBC Aquatics Centre
- Dates: August 8 - August 14

Swimming contests were held at the 2015 Parapan American Games from August 8 to 14 at the CIBC Aquatics Centre in Toronto, Canada.

== Medal table ==
Rank	Nation	Gold	Silver	Bronze	Total
1	Brazil (BRA)	38	29	37	104
2	Canada (CAN)	24	39	28	91
3	Mexico (MEX)	19	20	18	57
4	Colombia (COL)	13	6	6	25
5	Argentina (ARG)	9	7	9	25
6	United States (USA)	7	11	14	32
7	Cuba (CUB)	3	3	0	6
8	Venezuela (VEN)	3	2	2	7
9	Puerto Rico (PUR)	0	0	1	1
Totals (9 entries)		116	117	115	348

== Medalists ==
=== Men's events ===
Event	Gold	Silver	Bronze
Men's 50m freestyle S3	Cristopher Tronco; Mexico	Luis Burgos; Mexico	Fredy Diaz; Colombia
Men's 50m freestyle S4	Gustavo Sanchez; Mexico	Ronystony Cordeiro; Brazil	Juan Reyes; Mexico
Men's 50m freestyle S5	Daniel Dias; Brazil	Clodoaldo da Silva; Brazil	Edgar Pineda; Mexico
Men's 50m freestyle S6	Nelson Crispín; Colombia	Lorenzo Perez Escalona; Cuba	Talisson Glock; Brazil
Men's 50m freestyle S7	Carlos Serrano Zárate; Colombia	Jean-Michel Lavallière; Canada	Italo Gomes; Brazil
Men's 50m freestyle S8	Zack McAllister; Canada	Armando Andrade; Mexico	Christopher Sergeant; Canada
Men's 50m freestyle S9	Matheus da Silva; Brazil	Vanilton do Nascimento; Brazil	Ruiter Silva; Brazil
Men's 50m freestyle S10	Phelipe Melo; Brazil	Andre Brasil; Brazil	Nathan Stein; Canada
Men's 50m freestyle S11	Matheus Rheine; Brazil	Alex Palhares; Brazil; Brayan Urbano; Canada	none awarded
Men's 50m freestyle S12	Diego Cuesta; Colombia	Filipe de Abreu; Brazil	Darvin Baez; Puerto Rico
Men's 50m freestyle S13	Carlos Farrenberg; Brazil	Nicolas Turbide; Canada	Guilherme Batista; Brazil
Men's 100m freestyle S4	Gustavo Sanchez; Mexico	Ronystony Cordeiro; Brazil	Jesus Hernandez; Mexico
Men's 100m freestyle S5	Daniel Dias; Brazil	Clodoaldo da Silva; Brazil	Diego Lopez; Mexico
Men's 100m freestyle S6	Lorenzo Perez Escalona; Cuba	Nelson Crispín; Colombia	Talisson Glock; Brazil
Men's 100m freestyle S7	Carlos Serrano Zárate; Colombia	Jean-Michel Lavallière; Canada	Italo Gomes; Brazil
Men's 100m freestyle S8	Armando Andrade; Mexico	Zack McAllister; Canada	Caio Amorim Muniz; Brazil
Men's 100m freestyle S9	Vanilton do Nascimento; Brazil	Ruiter Silva; Brazil	Matheus da Silva; Brazil
Men's 100m freestyle S10	Andre Brasil; Brazil	Phelipe Melo; Brazil	Nathan Stein; Canada
Men's 100m freestyle S11	Matheus Rheine; Brazil	Brayan Urbano; Colombia	Alex Palhares; Brazil
Men's 100m freestyle S12	Diego Cuesta; Colombia	Filipe de Abreu; Brazil	Renato Nunes; Brazil
Men's 100m freestyle S13	Carlos Farrenberg; Brazil	Nicolas Turbide; Canada	Guilherme Batista; Brazil
Men's 200m freestyle S5	Daniel Dias; Brazil	Clodoaldo da Silva; Brazil	Diego Lopez; Mexico
Men's 200m freestyle S14	Felipe Caltran; Brazil	Maxime Rousselle; Canada	Gordie Michie; Canada
Men's 400m freestyle S6	Lorenzo Perez Escalona; Cuba	Talisson Glock; Brazil	Nelson Crispín; Colombia
Men's 400m freestyle S7	Facundo Arregui; Argentina	Carlos Serrano Zárate; Colombia	Italo Gomes; Brazil
Men's 400m freestyle S8	Caio Amorim Muniz; Brazil	Zack McAllister; Canada	Zach Zona; Canada
Men's 400m freestyle S9	Ruiter Silva; Brazil	Vanilton do Nascimento; Brazil	Marco Pulleiro; Argentina
Men's 400m freestyle S10	Benoît Huot; Canada	Isaac Bouckley; Canada	Alexander Elliot; Canada
Men's 400m freestyle S13	Devin Gotell; Canada	Nicolas Turbide; Canada	Tyler Mrak; Canada
Men's 50m backstroke S4	Juan Reyes; Mexico	Gustavo Sanchez; Mexico	Ronystony Cordeiro; Brazil
Men's 50m backstroke S5	Daniel Dias; Brazil	Diego Lopez; Mexico	Gerardo Castro; Mexico
Men's 100m backstroke S6	Talisson Glock; Brazil	Adam Purdy; Canada	Zachary Shattuck; United States
Men's 100m backstroke S7	Italo Gomes; Brazil	Matias de Andrade; Argentina	Guillermo Marro; Argentina
Men's 100m backstroke S8	Pipo Carlomagno; Argentina	Tom Miazga; United States	Lucas Poggi; Argentina
Men's 100m backstroke S10	Andre Brasil; Brazil	Benoît Huot; Canada	Alexander Elliot; Canada
Men's 100m backstroke S11	Sergio Zayas; Argentina	Brayan Urbano; Colombia	Leider Lemus; Colombia
Men's 100m backstroke S13	Nicolas Turbide; Canada	Devin Gotell; Canada	Tyler Mrak; Canada
Men's 100m backstroke S14	Gordie Michie; Canada	Adam Rahier; Canada	Alberto Jesus Vera; Canada
Men's 50m breaststroke SB3	Gustavo Sanchez; Mexico	Jonathan Dieleman; Canada	Ronystony Cordeiro; Brazil
Men's 100m breaststroke SB4	Moisés Fuentes; Colombia	Ronystony Cordeiro; Argentina	Francisco Avelino; Brazil
Men's 100m breaststroke SB5	Roberto Alcalde; Brazil	Pedro Rangel; Mexico	Humberto Romero; Mexico
Men's 100m breaststroke SB6	Nelson Crispín; Colombia	Fabiano de Toledo; Brazil	Roderick Sewell; United States
Men's 100m breaststroke SB7	Carlos Serrano Zárate; Colombia	Pipo Carlomagno; Argentina	Lucas McCrory; United States
Men's 100m breaststroke SB8	Facundo Lazo; Argentina	Armando Andrade; Mexico	Carlos Lopes Maciel; Brazil
Men's 100m breaststroke SB9	James Leroux; Canada	Isaac Bouckley; Canada	Alexander Elliot; Canada
Men's 100m breaststroke SB11	Brayan Urbano; Colombia	Yunerki Ortega; Cuba	Leider Lemus; Colombia
Men's 100m breaststroke SB13	Guilherme Batista; Brazil	Tyler Mrak; Canada	Renato Nunes; Brazil
Men's 100m breaststroke SB14	Elian Araya; Argentina	Felipe Caltran; Brazil	Gordie Michie; Canada
Men's 50m butterfly S5	Daniel Dias; Brazil	Edgar Pineda; Mexico	Juan Reyes; Mexico
Men's 50m butterfly S6	Nelson Crispín; Colombia	Talisson Glock; Brazil	Adam Purdy; Canada
Men's 50m butterfly S7	Carlos Serrano Zárate; Colombia	Jean-Michel Lavallière; Canada	Nathan Clement; Canada
Men's 100m butterfly S8	Armando Andrade; Mexico	Angel Buitian; Mexico	Zach Zona; Canada
Men's 100m butterfly S9	Juan Castillo; Cuba	Marco Pulleiro; Argentina	Vanilton do Naascimento; Brazil
Men's 100m butterfly S10	Andre Brasil; Brazil	Nathan Stein; Canada	Alexander Elliot; Canada
Men's 100m butterfly S13	Nicolas Turbide; Canada	Carlos Farrenberg; Brazil	Diego Cuesta; Canada
Men's 150m individual medley SM4	Gustavo Sanchez; Mexico	Juan Reyes; Mexico	Ronystony Cordeiro; Brazil
Men's 200m individual medley SM6	Talisson Glock; Brazil	Nelson Crispín; Colombia	Roberto Alcalde; Brazil
Men's 200m individual medley SM7	Carlos Serrano Zárate; Colombia	Jean-Michel Lavallière; Canada	Lucas McCrory; United States
Men's 200m individual medley SM8	Armando Andrade; Mexico	Angel Buitian; Mexico	Zach Zona; Canada
Men's 200m individual medley SM9	Ruiter Silva; Brazil	Lucas Mozela; Brazil	Marco Pulleiro; Argentina
Men's 200m individual medley SM10	Andre Brasil; Brazil	Benoît Huot; Canada	Alexander Elliot; Canada
Men's 200m individual medley SM11	Brayan Urbano; Colombia	Yunerki Ortega; Cuba	Leider Lemus; Colombia
Men's 200m individual medley SM13	Nicolas Turbide; Canada	Devin Gotell; Canada	Guilherme Batista; Brazil
Men's 200m individual medley SM14	Alberto Jesus Vera; Venezuela	Gordie Michie; Canada	Adam Rahier; Canada
Men's 4×100m freestyle relay 34pts	Brazil (BRA) Phelipe Melo; Daniel Dias; Ruiter Silva; Andre Brasil	Canada (CAN) Nathan Stein; Zack McAllister; Zach Zona; Jean-Michel Lavallière	Argentina (ARG) Marco Pulleiro; Pipo Carlomagno; Facundo Arregui; Bruno Lemaire
Men's 4×100m medley relay 34pts	Brazil (BRA) Daniel Dias; Matheus da Silva; Andre Brasil; Phelipe Melo	Canada (CAN) Benoît Huot; James Leroux; Jean-Michel Lavallière; Zack McAllister	Argentina (ARG) Matias de Andrade; Facundo Lazo; Marco Pulleiro; Bruno Lemaire

=== Women's events ===
Event	Gold	Silver	Bronze
Women's 50m freestyle S4	Nely Miranda; Mexico	Edenia Garcia; Brazil	Patricia Valle; Mexico
Women's 50m freestyle S5	Joana da Silva; Brazil	Esthefany de Oliveira; Brazil	Haley Beranbaum; United States
Women's 50m freestyle S6	Doramitzi Hernández; Mexico	Naomi Somellera; Mexico	Sophia Elizabeth Herzog; United States
Women's 50m freestyle S7	Tess Routliffe; Canada	Sarah Mehain; Canada	Veronica Almeida; Brazil
Women's 50m freestyle S8	Morgan Bird; Canada	Mallory Weggemann; United States	Cecilia Jeronimo; Brazil
Women's 50m freestyle S9	Daniela Gimenez; Argentina	Katarina Roxon; Canada	Camille Rodrigues; Brazil
Women's 50m freestyle S10	Aurelie Rivard; Canada	Rubi Cristino; Mexico	Mariana Gesteira; Brazil
Women's 50m freestyle S12	Belkys Mota; Venezuela	Anabel Moro; Argentina	Raquel Viel; Brazil
Women's 100m freestyle S4	Nely Miranda; Mexico	Edenia Garcia; Brazil	Tammy Cunnington; Canada
Women's 100m freestyle S5	Joana da Silva; Brazil	Esthefany de Oliveira; Brazil	Haley Beranbaum; United States
Women's 100m freestyle S6	Doramitzi Hernández; Mexico	Valeria López; Mexico	Vianney Trejo; Mexico
Women's 100m freestyle S7	Tess Routliffe; Canada	Sarah Mehain; Canada	Jessica Hernandez; Mexico
Women's 100m freestyle S8	Mallory Weggemann; United States	Morgan Bird; Canada	Cecilia Jeronimo; Brazil
Women's 100m freestyle S9	Camille Rodrigues; Brazil	Daniela Gimenez; Argentina	Katarina Roxon; Canada
Women's 100m freestyle S10	Aurelie Rivard; Canada	Rubi Cristino; Mexico	Mariana Gesteira; Brazil
Women's 100m freestyle S12	Anabel Moro; Argentina	Belkys Mota; Venezuela	Raquel Viel; Brazil
Women's 200m freestyle S4	Nely Miranda; Mexico	Tammy Cunnington; Canada	Claudia da Silva; Brazil
Women's 200m freestyle S5	Joana da Silva; Brazil	Esthefany de Oliveira; Brazil	Sofia Olmos; Mexico
Women's 200m freestyle S14	Beatriz Resendiz; Mexico	Kirstie Kasko; Canada	Leslie Cichocki; United States
Women's 400m freestyle S6	Valeria López; Mexico	Vianney Trejo; Mexico	Doramitzi Hernández; Mexico
Women's 400m freestyle S8	Morgan Bird; Canada	Mallory Weggemann; United States	Sabrina Duchesne; Canada
Women's 400m freestyle S9	Camille Rodrigues; Brazil	Katarina Roxon; Canada	Anna Johannes; United States
Women's 400m freestyle S10	Aurelie Rivard; Canada	Rubi Cristino; Mexico	Serafina King; United States
Women's 400m freestyle S13	Belkys Mota; Venezuela	Raquel Viel; Brazil	McClain Hermes; United States
Women's 50m backstroke S4	Edenia Garcia; Brazil	Nely Miranda; Mexico	Haidee Aceves; Mexico
Women's 50m backstroke S5	Haley Beranbaum; United States	Esthefany de Oliveira; Brazil	Leticia Lucas; Brazil
Women's 100m backstroke S6	Vianney Trejo; Mexico	Doramitzi Hernández; Mexico	Reilly Boyt; United States
Women's 100m backstroke S7	Tess Routliffe; Canada	Sarah Mehain; Canada	Jessica Hernandez; United States
Women's 100m backstroke S8	Ahalya Lettenberger; United States	Camille Bérubé; Canada	Mallory Weggemann; United States
Women's 100m backstroke S9	Camille Rodrigues; Brazil	Anna Johannes; United States	Katarina Roxon; Canada
Women's 100m backstroke S10	Aurelie Rivard; Canada	Mariana Gesteira; Brazil	Mitzi Mijares; Mexico
Women's 100m backstroke S13	Raquel Viel; Brazil	Ana Pellitero; Argentina	Anabel Moro; Argentina
Women's 100m backstroke S14	Leslie Cichocki; United States	Kirstie Kasko; Canada	Justine Morrier; Canada
Women's 50m breaststroke SB3	Patricia Valle; Mexico	Nely Miranda; Mexico	Rildene Fonseca; Brazil
Women's 100m breaststroke SB5	Paloma Garcia; Brazil	Haley Beranbaum; United States	Esthefany de Oliveira; Brazil
Women's 100m breaststroke SB6	Reilly Boyt; United States	Sophia Elizabeth Herzog; United States	Naomi Somellera; Mexico
Women's 100m breaststroke SB7	Tess Routliffe; Canada	Veronica Almeida; Brazil	Camille Bérubé; Canada
Women's 100m breaststroke SB8	Katarina Roxon; Canada	Anna Johannes; United States	Gabriela Cantagallo; Brazil
Women's 100m breaststroke SB9	Daniela Gimenez; Argentina	Aurelie Rivard; Canada	Sarah Girard; Canada
Women's 100m breaststroke SB13	Anabel Moro; Argentina	Raquel Viel; Brazil	Belkys Mota; Venezuela
Women's 100m breaststroke SB14	Justine Morrier; Canada	Vivana Moraes; Venezuela	Kirstie Kasko; Canada
Women's 50m butterfly S5	Joana da Silva; Brazil	Haley Berabaum; United States	Letícia Lucas; Brazil
Women's 50m butterfly S7	Sarah Mehain; Canada	Nelya Stary Schasfoort; United States	Veronica Almeida; Brazil
Women's 100m butterfly S10	Aurelie Rivard; Canada	Samantha Ryan; Canada	Daniela Gimenez; Argentina
Women's 150m individual medley SM4	Nely Miranda; Mexico	Patricia Valle; Mexico	Rildene Fonseca; Brazil
Women's 200m individual medley SM6	Reilly Boyt; United States	Sophia Elizabeth Herzog; United States	Vianney Trejo; Mexico
Women's 200m individual medley SM8	Mallory Weggemann; United States	Tess Routliffe; Canada	Camille Bérubé; Canada
Women's 200m individual medley SM10	Aurelie Rivard; Canada	Katarina Roxon; Canada	Daniela Gimenez; Argentina
Women's 200m individual medley SM14	Justine Morrier; Canada	Kirstie Kasko; Canada	Leslie Cichocki; United States

=== Mixed events ===
==== Relay ====
Event	Gold	Silver	Bronze
Mixed 4x50m freestyle relay 20pts	Brazil (BRA) Clodoaldo da Silva; Joana da Silva; Esthefany de Oliveira; Daniel Dias	United States (USA) Curtis Lovejoy; Sophia Elizabeth Herzog; Zachary Shattuck; Reilly Boyt	Canada (CAN) Adam Purdy; Daniel Murphy; Valerie Drapeau; Tammy Cunnington
