= South Korea at the 1968 Summer Paralympics =

- IPC code: KOR (COR used at these Games)
- NPC: Korean Paralympic Committee
- Website: www.kosad.or.kr (in Korean)

in Tel Aviv
- Competitors: 5 in 3 sports
- Medals: Gold 0 Silver 0 Bronze 0 Total 0

Summer Paralympics appearances (overview)
- 1968; 1972; 1976; 1980; 1984; 1988; 1992; 1996; 2000; 2004; 2008; 2012; 2016; 2020; 2024

South Korea competed at the 1968 Summer Paralympics in Tel Aviv, Israel. They were the third paralympics to be held and were originally meant to take place alongside the 1968 Summer Olympics in Mexico City, Mexico. However, in 1966 the Mexican government decided against it due to difficulties.

== Archery ==
Athlete	Event	Final	
Athlete	Event	Points	Rank
Kim	Men's St. Nicholas round paraplegic	704	4
Han	Men's St. Nicholas round paraplegic	686	6
Park	Men's St. Nicholas round paraplegic	590	19

== Athletics ==
Athlete	Event	Qualification		Final	
Athlete	Event	Result	Rank	Result	Rank
Choi	Men's Precision javelin throw open	68	10	DNQ	10
Park	Men's Precision javelin throw open	60	44	DNQ	44

== Table tennis ==
Athlete	Event	Round 1	Round 2	Round 3	Quarterfinals	Semifinals	Final
Athlete	Event	Opposition Result	Opposition Result	Opposition Result	Opposition Result	Opposition Result	Opposition Result
Park	Men's Singles B	Andre Hennaert (FRA); Lose					
Lee	Men's Singles B	Hofstad (NOR); Won	Giovanni Ferraris (ITA); Lose				
