= Swimming at the 2012 Summer Paralympics – Men's 50 metre freestyle S10 =

Event at the 2012 Summer Paralympics

Men's 50m Freestyle S10 at the XIV Paralympic Games
- Venue: London Aquatics Centre
- Dates: 31 August 2012
- Competitors: 20 from 15 nations
- Winning time: 23.16

Medalists
1st place, gold medalist(s)		André Brasil	Brazil
2nd place, silver medalist(s)		Nathan Stein	Canada
3rd place, bronze medalist(s)		Andrew Pasterfield	Australia

The men's 50m freestyle S10 event at the 2012 Summer Paralympics took place at the London Aquatics Centre on 31 August. There were three heats; the swimmers with the eight fastest times advanced to the final.

== Results ==
=== Heats ===
Competed from 10:14.

==== Heat 1 ====
Rank	Lane	Name	Nationality	Time	Notes
1	4	Nathan Stein	Canada	23.89	Q
2	6	Dmitry Grigorev	Russia	25.07	Q
3	5	Justin Zook	United States	25.22	Q
4	3	Graham Edmunds	Great Britain	25.28	
5	2	Isaac Bouckley	Canada	26.06	
6	7	Kardo Ploomipuu	Estonia	26.50	

==== Heat 2 ====
Rank	Lane	Name	Nationality	Time	Notes
1	4	Phelipe Andrews Melo Rodrigues	Brazil	24.12	Q
2	6	Ian Jaryd Silverman	United States	24.64	Q
3	5	Lin Furong	China	25.25	Q, AS
4	3	Michael Anderson	Australia	25.32	
5	2	Shahin Izadyar	Iran	25.97	
6	7	Rick Pendleton	Australia	26.26	
7	1	Matthew Sultana	Malta	31.12	

==== Heat 3 ====
Rank	Lane	Name	Nationality	Time	Notes
1	4	André Brasil	Brazil	23.50	Q, PR
2	5	Andrew Pasterfield	Australia	24.14	Q, OC
3	3	David Levecq	Spain	25.27	
4	6	Kevin Paul	South Africa	25.49	AF
5	1	Filip Coufal	Czech Republic	26.18	
6	7	Lasse Winther Andersen	Denmark	26.19	
7	2	Maksym Isaiev	Ukraine	26.76	

=== Final ===
Source: Competed at 18:06.

Rank	Lane	Name	Nationality	Time	Notes
1st place, gold medalist(s)	4	André Brasil	Brazil	23.16	WR
2nd place, silver medalist(s)	5	Nathan Stein	Canada	23.58	
3rd place, bronze medalist(s)	6	Andrew Pasterfield	Australia	23.89	OC
4	3	Phelipe Andrews Melo Rodrigues	Brazil	23.99	
5	7	Dmitry Grigorev	Russia	24.61	EU
6	2	Ian Jaryd Silverman	United States	24.65	
7	8	Lin Furong	China	24.86	AS
8	1	Justin Zook	United States	26.00	

Q = qualified for final. WR = World Record. PR = Paralympic Record. EU = European Record. AS = Asian Record. AF = African Record. OC = Oceania Record.
