= South Korea at the 2002 Winter Paralympics =

- IPC code: KOR
- NPC: Korean Paralympic Committee
- Website: www.kosad.or.kr (in Korean)

in Salt Lake City
- Competitors: 6
- Medals Ranked 21st: Gold 0 Silver 1 Bronze 0 Total 1

Winter Paralympics appearances (overview)
- 1992; 1994; 1998; 2002; 2006; 2010; 2014; 2018; 2022; 2026

South Korea competed at the 2002 Winter Paralympics in Salt Lake City, United States. 6 competitors from South Korea (5 men and 1 woman) participated, all in the Alpine Skiing event. Sang Min Han won the nation's only medal, clinching the silver in the Men's Giant Slalom LW12 event in Alpine Skiing. Han would go on to represent South Korea at the 2006, 2010, 2018, and 2022 Winter Paralympics.

Overall, South Korea finished 21st in the medal table.

== Results by Sport ==
=== Alpine Skiing ===
Sang Min Han won the only Korean medal in the Men's Giant Slalom (LW12), while Mi Jeong Kim narrowly missed out on a bronze, finishing 3.67 seconds behind 3rd place Austrian Gabriele Huemer in the Women's Downhill (B2-3). She also lost a bronze to France's Pascale Casanova in the Women's Super-G by 4.44 seconds.

Athlete	Event	Time	Rank
Young Jin Jeon	Men's Downhill LW3,5/7,9	1:37.63	9
Young Jin Jeon	Men's Giant Slalom LW3,5/7,9	-	DNF
Young Jin Jeon	Men's Super-G LW3,5/7,9	1:30.16	8
Young Jin Jeon	Men's Slalom LW3,5/7,9	1:50.64	7
Hongbin Kim	Men's Downhill LW3,5/7,9	-	DQ
Hongbin Kim	Men's Giant Slalom LW3,5/7,9	-	DNF
Hongbin Kim	Men's Super-G LW3,5/7,9	1:30.61	9
Hongbin Kim	Men's Slalom LW3,5/7,9	2:03.54	9
Nam Je Kim	Men's Downhill LW11	1:48.39	9
Nam Je Kim	Men's Giant Slalom LW11	-	DNF
Nam Je Kim	Men's Super-G LW11	1:39.00	9
Nam Je Kim	Men's Slalom LW11	-	DNF
Sang Min Han	Men's Downhill LW12	1:47.33	12
Sang Min Han	Men's Giant Slalom LW12	2:52.31	2
Sang Min Han	Men's Super-G LW12	1:34.58	7
Sang Min Han	Men's Slalom LW12	2:16.04	7
Hwan Kyung Lee	Men's Giant Slalom LW2	-	DNF
Hwan Kyung Lee	Men's Slalom LW2	2:30.90	22
Mi Jeong Kim	Women's Downhill B2-3	1:51.17	4
Mi Jeong Kim	Women's Giant Slalom B2-3	3:09.12	5
Mi Jeong Kim	Women's Super-G B2-3	1:37.22	4
Mi Jeong Kim	Women's Slalom B2-3	2:28.32	4

== See also ==
- South Korea at the Paralympics
- South Korea at the 2002 Winter Olympics
