= Archery at the 1992 Summer Paralympics – Men's individual AR2 =

Men's individual AR2 at the IX Paralympic Games
- Paralympic Archery
- Venue: Camp Olímpic de Tir amb Arc
- Dates: September 1992
- Competitors: 36 from 18 nations

Medalists
1st place, gold medalist(s)		Orazio Pizzorni	Italy
2nd place, silver medalist(s)		Hermann Nortmann	Germany
3rd place, bronze medalist(s)		Udo Wolf	Germany

The Men's Individual AR2 was an archery competition in the 1992 Summer Paralympics.

Italian gold medalist, Orazio Pizzorni, defeated the German archer Hermann Nortmann in the final. The bronze medal match was won by Nortmann's countryman Udo Wolf.

== Results ==
=== Qualifying round ===
Rank	Archer	Points	Notes
1	Ouk Soo Lee (KOR)	1259	
2	Udo Wolf (GER)	1242	
3	Orazio Pizzorni (ITA)	1230	
4	Luciano Malovini (ITA)	1222	
5	Alexander Gregory (GBR)	1220	
6	Pertti Pulkkinen (FIN)	1213	
7	Alec Denys (CAN)	1213	
8	Joseph Grejdus (USA)	1204	
9	Shigetoshi Yoshida (JPN)	1191	
10	Jang Sub Choi (KOR)	1191	
11	Giuseppe Gabelli (ITA)	1189	
12	Eric Klein (AUS)	1184	
13	Hermann Nortmann (GER)	1178	
14	Carlton Ray Clark (USA)	1177	
15	Antonio Millan (MEX)	1176	
16	Takatoshi Sato (JPN)	1174	
17	Arthur Fisk (AUS)	1168	
18	Alan Corrie (GBR)	1164	
19	Ping Sun Wong (HKG)	1161	
20	Heikki Laukkanen (FIN)	1155	
21	Masanori Morita (JPN)	1147	
22	Roger Eriksson (SWE)	1137	
23	Karl Bahls (GER)	1132	
24	Paavo Grekula (SWE)	1115	
25	Ki Ki Jang (KOR)	1112	

=== Finals ===
Quarter-finals
Arthur Fisk (AUS)	87
Joseph Grejdus (USA)	101
Masanori Morita (JPN)	98
Hermann Nortmann (GER)	101
Orazio Pizzorni (ITA)	106
Giuseppe Gabelli (ITA)	91
Alec Denys (CAN)	91
Udo Wolf (GER)	93

Semi-finals
Joseph Grejdus (USA)	88
Hermann Nortmann (GER)	100
Orazio Pizzorni (ITA)	105
Udo Wolf (GER)	99

Gold medal match
Hermann Nortmann (GER)	96
Orazio Pizzorni (ITA)	100
Bronze medal match
Joseph Grejdus (USA)	89
Udo Wolf (GER)	91
