= South Korea at the 2016 Summer Paralympics =

- IPC code: KOR
- NPC: Korea Paralympic Committee
- Website: www.koreanpc.kr (in Korean)

in Rio de Janeiro
- Competitors: 82 in 11 sports
- Flag bearer: Lee Ha-gel
- Medals Ranked 20th: Gold 7 Silver 11 Bronze 17 Total 35

Summer Paralympics appearances (overview)
- 1968; 1972; 1976; 1980; 1984; 1988; 1992; 1996; 2000; 2004; 2008; 2012; 2016; 2020; 2024

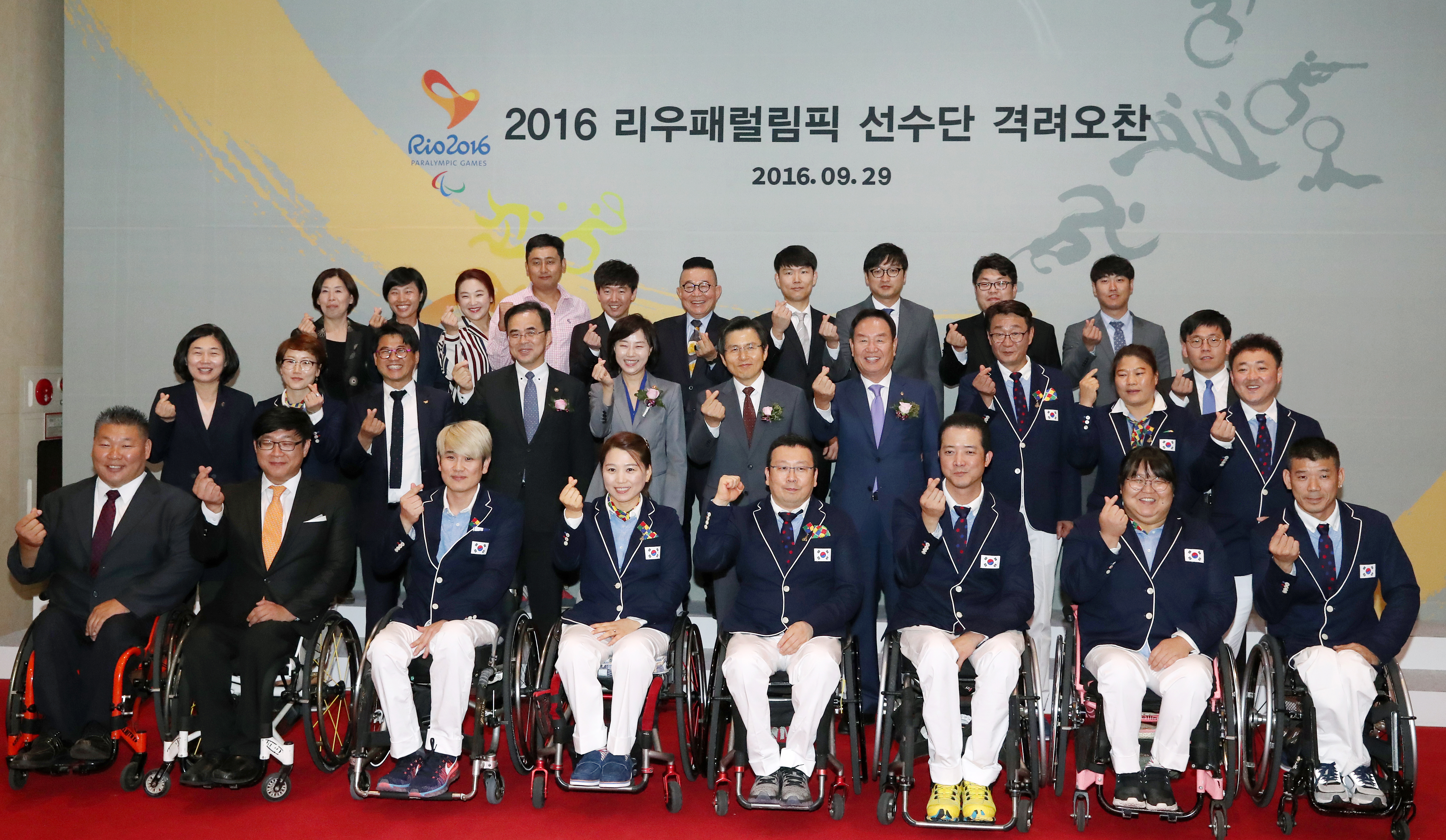
Part of the South Korean Paralympic team, taken after returning from Brazil.

South Korea competed at the 2016 Summer Paralympics in Rio de Janeiro, Brazil, from 7 to 18 September 2016.

== Disability classifications ==
Every participant at the Paralympics has their disability grouped into one of five disability categories; amputation, the condition may be congenital or sustained through injury or illness; cerebral palsy; wheelchair athletes, there is often overlap between this and other categories; visual impairment, including blindness; Les autres, any physical disability that does not fall strictly under one of the other categories, for example dwarfism or multiple sclerosis. Each Paralympic sport then has its own classifications, dependent upon the specific physical demands of competition. Events are given a code, made of numbers and letters, describing the type of event and classification of the athletes competing. Some sports, such as athletics, divide athletes by both the category and severity of their disabilities, other sports, for example swimming, group competitors from different categories together, the only separation being based on the severity of the disability.

== Medalists ==
Medal	Name	Sport	Event
Gold	Jeong Ho-won	Boccia	Mixed individual BC3
Gold	Choi Gwang-geun	Judo	Men's 100 kg
Gold	Jo Gi-seong	Swimming	Men's 50m freestyle S4
Gold	Jo Gi-seong	Swimming	Men's 100m freestyle S4
Gold	Jo Gi-seong	Swimming	Men's 200m freestyle S4
Gold	Lee In-kook	Swimming	Men's 100m backstroke S14
Gold	Choi Ilsang; Kim Jung-gil; Kim Young Gun	Table tennis	Men's teams - Class 4-5
Silver	Koo Dong-sub; Kim Ok-guem	Archery	Team compound W1
Silver	Jeon Min-Jae	Athletics	Women's 200m T36
Silver	Choi Ye-jin; Jeong Ho-won; Kim Han-soo	Boccia	Mixed pairs BC3
Silver	Lee Do-yeon	Cycling	Women's road race H1-4
Silver	Lee Jung-min	Judo	Men's 81 kg
Silver	Lee Ju-hee	Shooting	Men's 10m air pistol SH1
Silver	Kim Geun-soo	Shooting	Mixed 10m air rifle prone SH2
Silver	Woo Geun Lim	Swimming	Men's 100m breaststroke SB5
Silver	Joo Young-dae	Table tennis	Men's individual - Class 1
Silver	Cha Soo Yong; Joo Young Dae; Kim Kyung Mook	Table tennis	Men's team - Class 1-2
Silver	Seo Su-yeon	Table tennis	Women's individual - Class 1-2
Bronze	Kim Mi-soon	Archery	Women's individual compound open
Bronze	Lee Ouk Soo; Kim Mi-soon	Archery	Team compound open
Bronze	Kim Gyu Dae	Athletics	Men's 800m T54
Bronze	Kim Gyu Dae	Athletics	Men's marathon T54
Bronze	Yoo Won Jeong	Boccia	Mixed individual BC1
Bronze	Seo Ha-na	Judo	Women's 57 kg
Bronze	Jin Song-lee	Judo	Women's 63 kg
Bronze	Kim Su-wan	Shooting	Men's 10m air rifle standing SH1
Bronze	Lee Yun-ri	Shooting	Women's 50m rifle 3 positions SH1
Bronze	Lee Ju-hee	Shooting	Mixed 25m pistol SH1
Bronze	Lee Jang-ho	Shooting	Mixed 10m air rifle prone SH1
Bronze	Kim Geun-soo	Shooting	Mixed 10m air rifle standing SH2
Bronze	Nam Ki-won	Table tennis	Men's individual - Class 1
Bronze	Jung Young-A	Table tennis	Women's individual - Class 5
Bronze	Kim Seong-ok	Table tennis	Women's individual - Class 7
Bronze	Women's team	Table tennis	Women's team - Class 1-3
Bronze	Women's team	Table tennis	Women's team - Class 4-5

== Archery ==
South Korea qualified seven archers for the Rio Games following their performance at the 2015 World Archery Para Championships. This included two spots in the compound open, 1 for a man and 1 for a woman, four spots in the recurve open with 3 for men and 1 for a woman, and 1 spot for a woman in the W1 event.

== Boccia ==
South Korea qualified for the 2016 Summer Paralympics in this sport at the Hong Kong hosted 2015 BISFed Asia and Oceania Boccia Team and Pairs Championships in the BC3 Pair event. They claimed gold ahead of silver medalist Thailand and bronze medalists Singapore. The pair team included Jeong Ho-won, Kim Han-soo, and Kim Jun-yup, and they were ranked second in the world at the time. They entered qualification as the number one seed in Asia in their event.

== Cycling ==
With one pathway for qualification being one highest ranked NPCs on the UCI Para-Cycling male and female Nations Ranking Lists on 31 December 2014, South Korea qualified for the 2016 Summer Paralympics in Rio, assuming they continued to meet all other eligibility requirements.

== Judo ==
Athlete	Event	Quarterfinals	Semifinals	Repechage	Bronze medal	Final	
Athlete	Event	Opposition Result	Opposition Result	Opposition Result	Opposition Result	Opposition Result	Rank
Songlee Jin	Women's 63 kg	Pernheim (SWE)					

== Shooting ==
The first opportunity to qualify for shooting at the Rio Games took place at the 2014 IPC Shooting World Championships in Suhl. Shooters earned spots for their NPC. South Korea earned a qualifying spot at this event in the R1 – 10m Air Rifle standing men SH1 event as a result of Seungchul Lee winning a silver medal. Teammate Jinho Park set an Asian record in the R1 – 10m Air Rifle standing men SH1 qualifying round. South Korea qualified another shooter in the R7 – 50m rifle 3 positions Men SH1 event after Jinho Park won a bronze medal in this event. South Korea earned a spot in the P1 – 10m Air Pistol Men SH1 event after Heejung Lee won gold in the event. Jinho Park qualified South Korea for the R3 – 10Mm Air Rifle Prone Mix SH1 event.

== Swimming ==
The top two finishers in each Rio medal event at the 2015 IPC Swimming World Championships earned a qualifying spot for their country for Rio. Giseong Jo earned South Korea a spot after winning gold in the Men's 200m Freestyle S4.

== Wheelchair tennis ==
South Korea qualified two competitors in the men's single event, Im Ho-won and Ha-Gel Lee.The slots came about via a Bipartite Commission Invitation place. South Korea qualified one player in the women's singles event, Ju-Youn Park.

== See also ==
- South Korea at the Paralympics
- South Korea at the 2016 Summer Olympics
