= Andrew Pasterfield =

Australian Paralympic swimmer

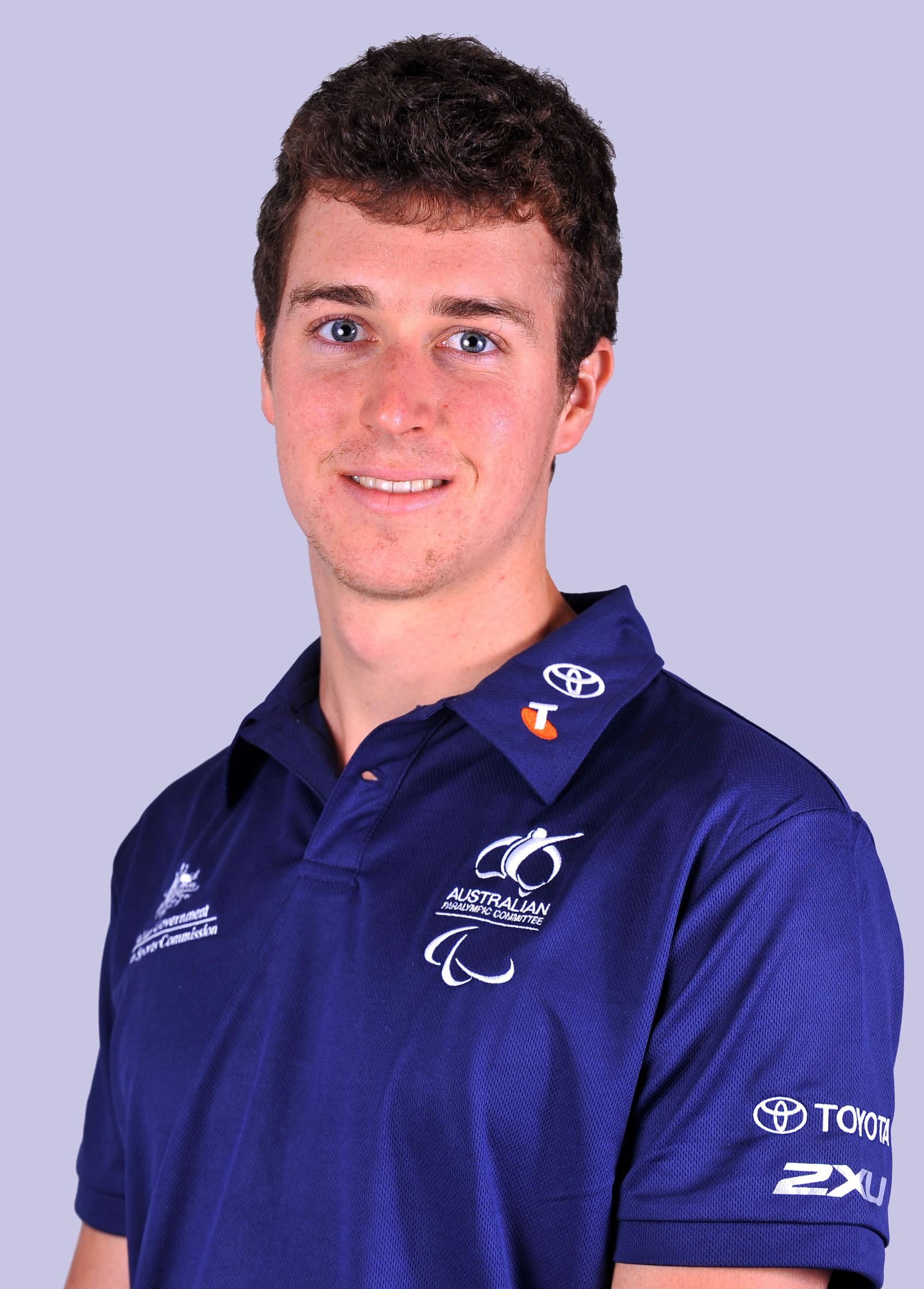
- 2012 Australian Paralympic team portrait of Pasterfield

Personal information
- Full name: Andrew Bruce Pasterfield
- Nickname: Pasty
- Nationality: Australia
- Born: 23 November 1989 (age 36) Brisbane, Queensland, Australia

Sport
- Sport: Swimming
- Strokes: Freestyle, backstroke
- Classifications: S10, SB9, SM10
- Club: Castle Hill RSL; Cranbrook Eastern Edge
- Coach: Greg Morrison
Medal record
Men's paralympic swimming
Representing Australia
Paralympic Games
Gold medal – first place	2012 London	4×100 m freestyle
Bronze medal – third place	2012 London	50 m freestyle S10
Bronze medal – third place	2012 London	100 m freestyle S10
Bronze medal – third place	2012 London	4×100 m medley
World Championships (LC)
Gold medal – first place	2010 Eindhoven	4×100 m freestyle
Gold medal – first place	2010 Eindhoven	4×100 m medley
Silver medal – second place	2010 Eindhoven	50 m freestyle S10
Commonwealth Games
Silver medal – second place	2010 Delhi	100 m freestyle S10

Andrew Bruce Pasterfield, OAM (born 23 November 1989) is a Paralympic swimmer from Australia.

== Swimming ==
Andrew Bruce Pasterfield competed in the 2010 IPC Swimming World Championships, held in Eindhoven, Netherlands where he won a gold medal in the men's 4 × 100 m freestyle relay event.

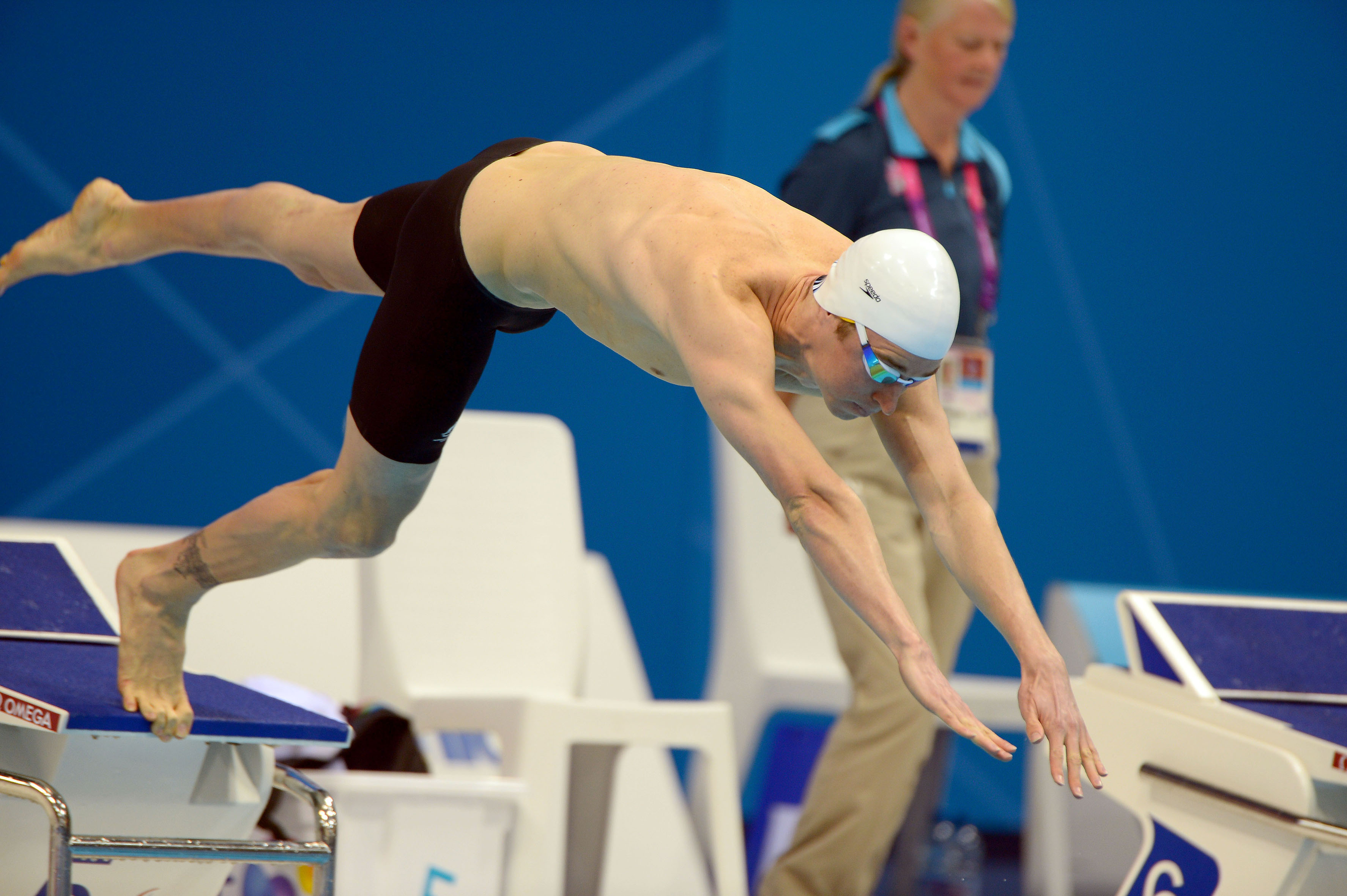
Pasterfield at the 2012 London Paralympics

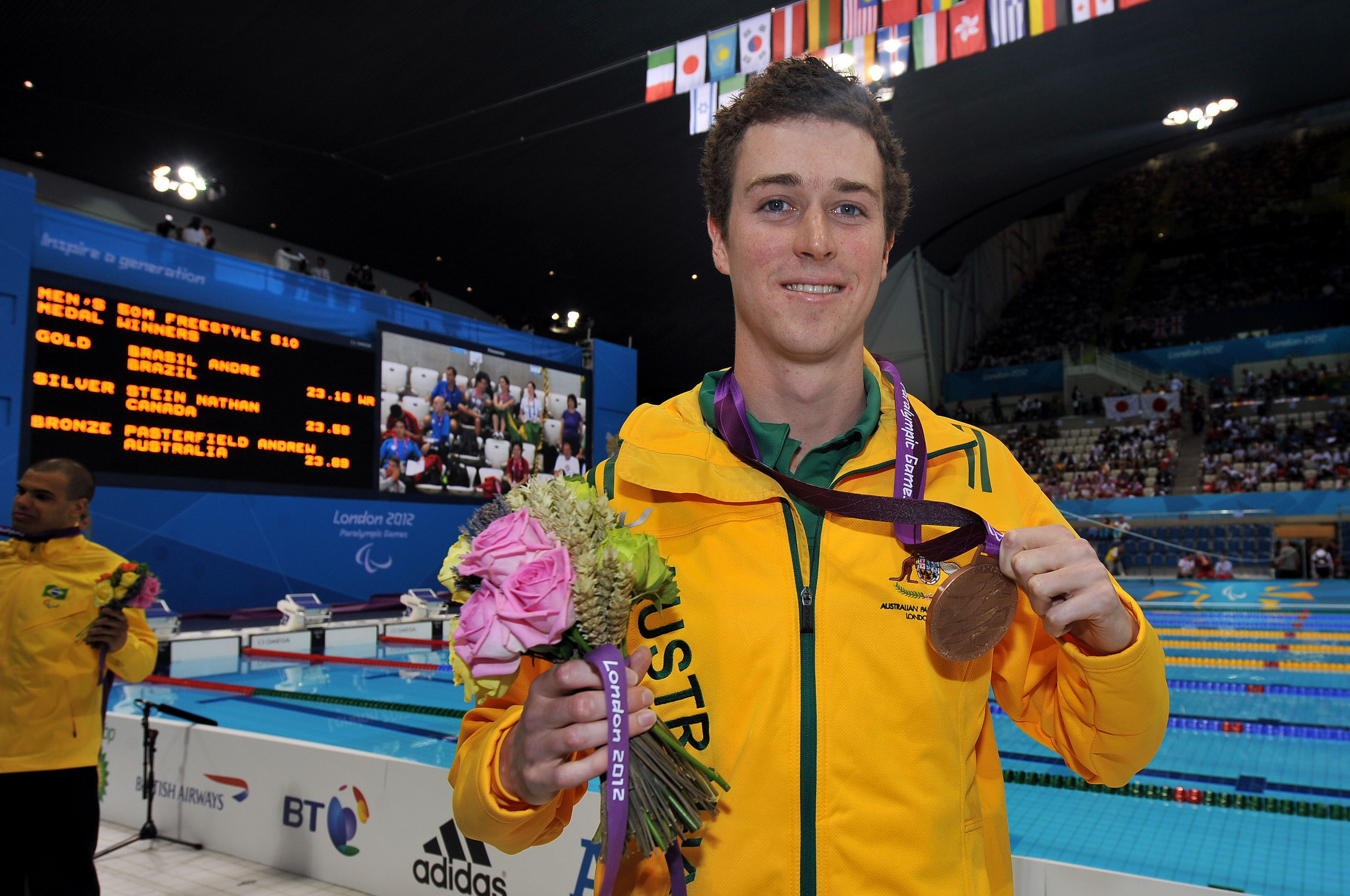
Pasterfield at the 2012 London Paralympics

At the 2012 Summer Paralympics Pasterfield won a gold in the Men's 4 × 100 m Freestyle Relay 34 points, and three bronzes in the Men's 50 m Freestyle S10, 100 m Freestyle S10 and Men's 4 × 100 m Medley Relay 34 points. He also participated in the Men's 100 m Backstroke S10 and Men's 100 m Butterfly S10 events.

He was awarded an Order of Australia Medal in the 2014 Australia Day Honours "for service to sport as a Gold Medallist at the London 2012 Paralympic Games."

In 2016, he was awarded Speedo Services to the Australian Swim Team at the Swimming Australia Awards.

== See also ==
- Australia at the Paralympics
- Disabled sports

== Bibliography ==
- Wake, Rebekka (September 2010). "Golden Glow Over Australian Swimming". Australian Paralympian. 2. Australia: Australian Paralympic Committee.
