= South Korea at the 1972 Summer Paralympics =

- IPC code: KOR (COR used at these Games)
- NPC: Korean Paralympic Committee
- Website: www.kosad.or.kr (in Korean)

in Heidelberg
- Medals Ranked 16th: Gold 4 Silver 2 Bronze 1 Total 7

Summer Paralympics appearances (overview)
- 1968; 1972; 1976; 1980; 1984; 1988; 1992; 1996; 2000; 2004; 2008; 2012; 2016; 2020; 2024

South Korea competed at the 1972 Summer Paralympics in Heidelberg, West Germany.

== Medalists ==
Medal	Name	Sport	Event
Gold	Cho Keum-Im	Archery	Women's St. Nicholas round paraplegic
Gold	Song Sin-Nam	Table tennis	Men's Singles 1B
Gold	Choi Tae-Am	Table tennis	Men's Singles 2
Gold	South Korea	Table tennis	Men's Teams 3
Silver	Heo Yong; Cho Keum-Im; Lee Hae-Sik	Archery	Mixed St. Nicholas round team paraplegic
Silver	Kim Keun-Soo; Cho Keum-Im	Dartchery	Mixed pairs open
Bronze	Kim Keun-Soo	Archery	Men's short western round open

== Archery ==
Athlete	Event	Final	
Athlete	Event	Points	Rank
Kim Keun-Soo	Men's short western round open	741	3rd place, bronze medalist(s)
Kim Yoon-Bae	Men's short western round open	734	T4
Lee Hae-Sik	Men's St. Nicholas round paraplegic	680	9
Heo Yong	Men's St. Nicholas round paraplegic	676	13
Cho Keum-Im	Women's St. Nicholas round paraplegic	680	1st place, gold medalist(s)
Heo Yong; Cho Keum-Im; Lee Hae-Sik	Mixed St. Nicholas round team paraplegic	2036	2nd place, silver medalist(s)

== Athletics ==
Athlete	Event	Heats		Final	
Athlete	Event	Result	Rank	Result	Rank
Park Yeon-Kyu	Men's 100 m wheelchair 4	34.1	41	DNQ	41
Song Sin-Nam	Men's 60 m wheelchair 1B	40.7	24	DNQ	24
Song Sin-Nam	Men's Discus throw 1B	n/a		9.60	8
Song Sin-Nam	Men's Shot put 1B	n/a		4.01	6

== Dartchery ==
Athlete	Event	Rank
Kim Keun-Soo; Cho Keum-Im	Mixed pairs open	2nd place, silver medalist(s)

== Table tennis ==
=== Individual competition ===
Athlete	Event	Quarterfinals	Semifinals	Final
Athlete	Event	Opposition Result	Opposition Result	Opposition Result
Song Sin-Nam	Men's Singles 1B	Pimmelar (NED); W 2–0	S. Bradshaw (GBR); W 2–0	Daniel Jeannin (FRA); W 2–0
Choi Tae-Am	Men's Singles 2	Manfred Emmel (FRG); W 2–0	Giuseppe Trieste (ITA); W 2–0	Lesli Lam (HKG); W 2–0
Choi Keum-Im	Women's Singles 4	I. Schmidt (NED); L 0–2		

=== Team competition ===
Men's Teams 2 — Preliminaries

South Korea	1–3	Sweden

Team (Group A)	Pld	W	L	Pts
Sweden	2	2	0	6:2
Denmark	1	0	1	1:3
South Korea	1	0	1	1:3

Men's Teams 3 — Preliminaries

South Korea	0–3	France
South Korea	3–0	Switzerland

Team (Group B)	Pld	W	L	Pts
France	2	2	0	6:0
South Korea	2	1	1	3:3
Switzerland	2	0	2	0:6

Men's Teams 4

(gold) — South Korea
