= South Korea at the 1984 Summer Paralympics =

- IPC code: KOR
- NPC: Korean Paralympic Committee
- Website: www.kosad.or.kr (in Korean)

in Stoke Mandeville/New York
- Competitors: 18
- Medals Ranked 37th: Gold 0 Silver 2 Bronze 2 Total 4

Summer Paralympics appearances (overview)
- 1968; 1972; 1976; 1980; 1984; 1988; 1992; 1996; 2000; 2004; 2008; 2012; 2016; 2020; 2024

South Korea competed at the 1984 Summer Paralympics in Stoke Mandeville, Great Britain and New York City, United States. 18 competitors from South Korea won 4 medals, 2 silver and 2 bronze, and finished joint 37th in the medal table with India.

== See also ==
- South Korea at the Paralympics
- South Korea at the 1984 Summer Olympics
