= St. Nicholas round open medalists =

St. Nicholas round open is a form of archery at the Summer Paralympics, which was held between 1960 and 1976. Both men and women competed in the event.

== Men's events ==
=== Men's St. Nicholas round open ===
Event	Gold	Silver	Bronze
1960 Rome	Ross Sutton; Australia	Gérard Figoni; France	Paul Sones; United States
1964 Tokyo	G. P. Marais; South Africa	Roy Fowler; Australia	David; France

=== Men's St. Nicholas round team open ===
Event	Gold	Silver	Bronze
1964 Tokyo	France (FRA)	Japan (JPN)	None

=== Men's St. Nicholas round (cervical) ===
Event	Gold	Silver	Bronze
1968 Tel Aviv	Nicholson; Great Britain	Allan McLucas; Australia	S. Bradshaw; Great Britain

=== Men's St. Nicholas round (paraplegic) ===
Event	Gold	Silver	Bronze
1968 Tel Aviv	Arballo; United States	Nadal; France	Guenson; France
1972 Heidelberg	R. Schmidberger; West Germany	Nakamura; Japan	Busch; West Germany

=== Men's St. Nicholas round open (tetraplegic) ===
Event	Gold	Silver	Bronze
1972 Heidelberg	Steiner; West Germany	Konkel; West Germany	Ohashi; Japan
1976 Toronto	Casper Caspersen; Norway	L. Smith; Great Britain	R. Thibodeau; Canada

== Mixed events ==
=== Mixed St. Nicholas round open (paraplegic) ===
Event	Gold	Silver	Bronze
1972 Heidelberg	West Germany (FRG)	South Korea (KOR)	Italy (ITA)

=== Mixed St. Nicholas round open (tetraplegic) ===
Event	Gold	Silver	Bronze
1972 Heidelberg	West Germany (FRG)	Great Britain (GBR)	None

== Women's events ==
=== Women's St. Nicholas round open ===
Event	Gold	Silver	Bronze
1960 Rome	Joan Horan; Ireland	Daphne Ceeney; Australia	Zander; Belgium
1964 Tokyo	I. Marincowitz; South Africa	Caroline Troxler-Kung; Switzerland	Irene Preslipski; United States

=== Women's St. Nicholas round open (cervical) ===
Event	Gold	Silver	Bronze
1968 Tel Aviv	Ruth Brooks; Great Britain	Rosaleen Gallagher; Ireland	None

=== Women's St. Nicholas round open (paraplegic) ===
Event	Gold	Silver	Bronze
1968 Tel Aviv	Girard; France	Johansson; Sweden	Moore; United States
1972 Heidelberg	Keum Im Cho; South Korea	E. Wolvaardt; South Africa	Yamahata; Japan

=== Women's St. Nicholas round open (tetraplegic) ===
Event	Gold	Silver	Bronze
1972 Heidelberg	Liebrecht; West Germany	Anderson; Great Britain	Jane Blackburn; Great Britain
1976 Toronto	Liebrecht; West Germany	None	None
