= South Korea at the 1996 Summer Paralympics =

- IPC code: KOR
- NPC: Korean Paralympic Committee
- Website: www.kosad.or.kr (in Korean)

in Atlanta
- Competitors: 65 (56 men and 9 women)
- Medals Ranked 12th: Gold 13 Silver 2 Bronze 15 Total 30

Summer Paralympics appearances (overview)
- 1968; 1972; 1976; 1980; 1984; 1988; 1992; 1996; 2000; 2004; 2008; 2012; 2016; 2020; 2024

65 athletes (56 men and 9 women) from South Korea competed at the 1996 Summer Paralympics in Atlanta, United States.

== Medallists ==
Medal	Name	Sport	Event
Gold	Ouk Soo Lee	Archery	Men's individual W2
Gold	Tae Sung An; Hyeon Cho; Hak Young Lee	Archery	Men's team standing
Gold	Du Chun Kim	Athletics	Men's 100m T35
Gold	Du Chun Kim	Athletics	Men's 400m T34-35
Gold	Hae Ryong Kim	Boccia	Mixed individual C1
Gold	Jeong Yong Kwak	Powerlifting	Men's 48 kg
Gold	Keum Jong Jung	Powerlifiting	Men's 52 kg
Gold	Im Yeon Kim	Shooting	Women's air rifle 3x20 SH1
Gold	Tae Ho Han	Shooting	Men's air rifle standing SH1
Gold	Hae Gon Lee	Table tennis	Men's singles 1
Gold	Kyung Mook Kim	Table tennis	Men's singles 2
Gold	Im Yeon Kim	Shooting	Women's standard rifle 3x20 SH1
Gold	Young Soo Kim; Jong Dae An; Ki Hoon Kim	Table tennis	Men's teams 3
Silver	Jong Kil Kim	Cycling	Mixed 20k bicycle CP3
Silver	Jong Park	Powerlifting	Men's 75 kg
Bronze	Tae Sung An	Archery	Men's individual standing
Bronze	In You; Doo Oh; Ouk Soo Lee	Archery	Men's teams W1/W2
Bronze	Du Chun Kim	Athletics	Men's 200m T34-35
Bronze	Yeon Choi	Athletics	Men's javelin F35
Bronze	Joon Kim; Won You; Hae Ryong Kim; Yu Seok Jung	Boccia	Mixed team C1-C2
Bronze	Il Keun Kim	Judo	Men's 60 kg
Bronze	Yu Sung An	Judo	Men's 86 kg
Bronze	Chul Lim	Lawn bowls	Men's singles LB2
Bronze	Sang Jin Yoon	Powerlifting	Men's 56 kg
Bronze	Im Yeon Kim	Shooting	Women's air rifle standing SH1
Bronze	Soo Bok Kim	Swimming	Men's 100m backstroke S7
Bronze	Kang Sung-hoon	Table tennis	Men's singles 1
Bronze	Kwang Hoon Jung	Table tennis	Men's singles 10
Bronze	Kyung Mook Kim; Haun Park; Hae Gon Lee; Kang Sung-hoon	Table tennis	Men's team 1-2
Bronze	Tae Hoon Park	Table tennis	Men's épée individual B

== See also ==
- South Korea at the Paralympics
- South Korea at the 1996 Summer Olympics
