= Luis Armando Andrade Guillen =

Mexican Paralympic swimmer (born 1995)

Personal information
- Born: 10 March 1995 (age 31) La Paz, Baja California Sur, Mexico
- Height: 1.75 m (5 ft 9 in)

Sport
- Country: Mexico
- Sport: Paralympic swimming
- Disability class: S8, SB8, SM8
Medal record
Paralympic swimming
Representing Mexico
World Championships
| Bronze medal – third place | 2015 Glasgow | 100m butterfly S8 |
| Bronze medal – third place | 2017 Mexico City | 50m freestyle S8 |
| Bronze medal – third place | 2017 Mexico City | 100m freestyle S8 |
| Bronze medal – third place | 2017 Mexico City | 100m butterfly S8 |
| Bronze medal – third place | 2017 Mexico City | 4x50m freestyle relay |
Parapan American Games
| Gold medal – first place | 2011 Guadalajara | 50m freestyle S8 |
| Gold medal – first place | 2011 Guadalajara | 100m freestyle S8 |
| Gold medal – first place | 2011 Guadalajara | 100m butterfly S8 |
| Gold medal – first place | 2011 Guadalajara | 200m individual medley SM8 |
| Gold medal – first place | 2015 Toronto | 100m freestyle S8 |
| Gold medal – first place | 2015 Toronto | 100m butterfly S8 |
| Gold medal – first place | 2015 Toronto | 200m individual medley SM8 |
| Gold medal – first place | 2019 Lima | 100m freestyle S8 |
| Gold medal – first place | 2019 Lima | 200m individual medley SM8 |
| Silver medal – second place | 2011 Guadalajara | 100m breaststroke SB8 |
| Silver medal – second place | 2011 Guadalajara | 4x50m freestyle relay |
| Silver medal – second place | 2011 Guadalajara | 4x100m freestyle relay |
| Silver medal – second place | 2015 Toronto | 50m freestyle S8 |
| Silver medal – second place | 2015 Toronto | 100m breaststroke SB8 |
| Silver medal – second place | 2019 Lima | 50m freestyle S8 |
| Silver medal – second place | 2019 Lima | 100m breaststroke SB8 |
| Silver medal – second place | 2019 Lima | 100m butterfly S8 |
| Bronze medal – third place | 2011 Guadalajara | 4x100m medley relay |
| Bronze medal – third place | 2019 Lima | 100m backstroke S8 |

Luis Armando Andrade Guillen (born March 10, 1995) is a Mexican Paralympic swimmer. He was born in Baja California Sur, Mexico.

When Armando was 6 years old, in a car accident, he lost his arm. At that time, he started swimming as a form of therapy. Eventually, Armando earned the opportunity to compete in some competitions in Mexico and then in the Paralympics. From the age of eleven, Armando participated in the Paralympics. He went on to compete in the 2011 Pan American Games in Guadalajara and the IPC World Swimming Championships in Glasgow 2015.

For being a very young competitor, Armando in January 2016 he was nominated for the FaceNews Youth Leadership Award.

== Personal life ==
Luis Armando Andrade Guillen is a Mexican athlete who was born on March 10, 1995, in Baja California Sur, Mexico.

His parents instilled a love of swimming to him and his brothers from an early age. When Armando was one year old, he could swim and float by himself in the sea.

=== Accident ===
On the way back from his older brother's football game in San José del Cabo, there was an accident where the driver lost control of the truck. Armando's arm was trapped under the truck and permanently injured.

Armando was in intensive care before going under an operation by the doctor Martin Abaroa. The doctor said that with the operation he can only save Armando's shoulder and a small stump which can help him to use the prosthesis. The operation lasted 72 hours.

=== Legal and economic issues ===
After Armando was discharged by the doctor, his parents did not have economic resources for his medical bills.

They met with the secretary of Baja California Sur, Víctor Guluarte Castro. They proposed that the state should assume the payment of medical expenses. Armando's parents explained that the driver was working for the state and that the truck was the property of the state. There was no support from the government, and then Armando's mother decided to sue the state. Attorney Rafael Ortega Cruz agreed to help the family at no cost.

In November 2001, Bertha was threatened with death for having made the demand against the state government. After 10 years of litigation, the local judge ordered the state government to pay damages.

== Career ==
After Armando's surgery, he began swimming as a form of therapy to strengthen the stump. At nine years old, Armando and his twin brother came to a public swimming pool. There they met the coach Francisco Guillen Patino, who saw potential in the children to compete.

=== First Appearances ===
One of his first appearances was in 2006 at the State Olympiad where he competed against conventional swimmers. His performance opened the door for the National Olympiad 2007 in Puebla, where the child of 11 years won three gold medals in the competition.

For problems with the coach, the young athlete did not compete in 2008, but a year later returned to the National Olympiad in Sonora. The parents of Armando sold items to be with him at that competition because the money that they earned was not enough for the expenses.

In that competition, Armando became part of the national team of Mexico. Coach Fernando Vélez was fascinated by his swimming style and immediately summoned to the Parapan Youth Games in Bogotá, Colombia, where he won five golds and a bronze. In 2010 he participated in the World Championships in the Netherlands, and in 2011 was declared as the best swimmer in the Parapan.

=== Guadalajara 2011 Parapan American Games ===
==== Career support ====
Despite his success, Armando has been ignored by the state government as the Instituto SudCaliforniano del Deporte, which only gives him monthly support of 400 pesos and allows him to train for free at the pool at the Multipurpose Gymnasium.

To attend Parapan American Games, the family had to borrow to pay for transportation, lodging, meals and tickets to the competitions, because the organizers only give them tickets for a proof.

==== Competition ====
He participated in Guadalajara 2011 Parapan American Games with 16 years old and as a representative of Mexico. In that event, Armando won eight medals: four gold, three silvers and one bronze.

The young athlete won gold medals in several proofs wherein all he implanted Pan American records:

- 100-meter freestyle (1 minute 04 seconds 28 hundredths)
- 100-meter butterfly style (1 minute 08 seconds 22 hundredths)
- 200-meter individual medley (2 minutes 38 seconds 86 hundredths)
- 50 meters freestyle (29 seconds 74 hundredths).

The three silver medals that he won were in 100-meter breaststroke individually, as a member of the relay 4x100 meter freestyle and 4×50 meter freestyle, while the bronze medal was won in the proof of 4×100 meter medley relay.

=== Achievements ===
His first Paralympics was in Puebla 2007. Armando was 11 years old and he won three gold medals in the three proofs he participated.

He competed in the discipline of 100-meter butterfly style, 100-meter freestyle, 200 meters combined, 50-meter freestyle, 100-meter chest, and in relays at the Parapan American Games in Guadalajara, Jal. in November 2011.

He was the last relay and in charge of lighting the incense burner Olympic to begin the Paralympic Games in Guadalajara, Jalisco, in which he won 8 medals (4 gold, 3 silver, and 1 bronze), participating individually and in groups.

In the individual competitions of 50-meter freestyle, 200-meter medley, and 100-meter butterfly style, he imposed new record.

At 16 years old, in Guadalajara 2011, he became the highest medalist with 8 medals, including four gold.

He participated in the Paralympic Games, realized in London 2012 at the London Aquatics Center, in the 100 meters freestyle (S8), Butterfly (S8), Chest (S8) and 200 meters Individual (SM8 ).

On the second day of competition of the fifth Parapan American Games (Toronto, Canada, August 2015), Luis Armando established a new brand for the continent in the preliminary 50 meter freestyle, S8 category. The record was 27.75 seconds in the qualifying round.

He won the silver medal in the competition of the 50-meter freestyle swimming of Toronto 2015 Parapan American Games, where the winner was the Canadian Zack McAllister, who also broke the record of the event (27.75 Mexican Armando Andrade). In the end, Andrade stopped the clock in 27.81 seconds to keep the silver and leave the gold with 27.69 to the local McAllister.

He won the gold medal and 4 silver medals in Edmonton, Canada.

He debuted in IPC World Swimming Championships (Glasgow 2015) and won his first World Cup medal: bronze in 100 meters in butterfly style.

=== Nominated for the FaceNews Youth Leadership Award ===
Luis Armando Andrade received on January 13, 2016, the FacesNews Award nomination, which provides a magazine, for its Youth Leadership.

In response Armando Andrade said: "It is something very important and an honor, is what I want, that the generations of today consider me a leader and a role model, for that I work: to serve as motivation and show that when you have perseverance you can accomplish many things", said the swimmer of S8 category and a native of Baja California Sur.
