= Windsor round open medalists =

Windsor round open was one of the first events to be held in archery. Both men and women competed in the event in 1960.

== Men's Windsor round open ==
Event	Gold	Silver	Bronze
1960 Rome	Jack Whitman; United States	Bradley; Great Britain	van Puymbroeck; Belgium

== Women's Windsor round open ==
Event	Gold	Silver	Bronze
1960 Rome	Margaret Harriman; Rhodesia	R. Irvine; Great Britain	Comley; Great Britain
