= South Korea at the 1992 Summer Paralympics =

- IPC code: KOR
- NPC: Korean Paralympic Committee
- Website: www.kosad.or.kr (in Korean)

in Barcelona
- Competitors: 66
- Medals Ranked 15th: Gold 11 Silver 15 Bronze 18 Total 44

Summer Paralympics appearances (overview)
- 1968; 1972; 1976; 1980; 1984; 1988; 1992; 1996; 2000; 2004; 2008; 2012; 2016; 2020; 2024

South Korea competed at the 1992 Summer Paralympics in Barcelona, Spain. 66 competitors from South Korea won 44 medals, 11 gold, 15 silver and 18 bronze and finished 12th in the medal table.

== See also ==
- South Korea at the Paralympics
- South Korea at the 1992 Summer Olympics
