= Nathan Stein =

Canadian para swimmer

Personal information
- Born: March 28, 1992 (age 34) Maple Ridge, British Columbia, Canada
- Home town: Port Coquitlam, British Columbia, Canada
- Height: 190.5 cm (6 ft 3 in)

Sport
- Country: Canada
- Sport: Para swimming
- Disability class: S10
- Event(s): butterfly, freestyle, medley
- Club: Surrey Knights Swim Club
- Coach: Reg Shaw
Medal record
Men's para swimming
Representing Canada
Paralympic Games
Silver medal – second place	2012 London	50 m freestyle S10
IPC World Championships
Bronze medal – third place	2015 Glasgow	50 m freestyle S10
Bronze medal – third place	2015 Glasgow	100 m freestyle S10
Parapan American Games
Silver medal – second place	2015 Toronto	100m butterfly S10
Silver medal – second place	2015 Toronto	4x100m medley relay
Bronze medal – third place	2015 Toronto	50m freestyle S10
Bronze medal – third place	2015 Toronto	100m freestyle S10

Nathan Stein (born March 28, 1992) is a para swimmer from Canada. He competes in S10 classification events.

== Swimming career ==
Stein represented Canada at the 2012 Summer Paralympics in London, where he entered three events: the 50m and 100m freestyle (S10), the 100m butterfly and the 100m breaststroke. He made the finals of both the freestyle events, finishing fifth in the 100m, and in the 50m, his time of 23.58 saw him finish in second place to collect the silver medal.

As well as Paralympic Success, Stein has also won medals at both the World Championships and the Parapan American Games.

== Personal history ==
Stein was born in Maple Ridge, Canada in 1992. Stein has the condition osteochondritis dissecans in one of his knees, which is bone deficiency. He has had multiple operations on his knee since first breaking it at the age of 11.

== Honours ==
In 2012 Stein was awarded the Queen Elizabeth II Diamond Jubilee Medal.
