= South Korea at the Paralympics =

- IPC code: KOR
- NPC: Korean Paralympic Committee
- Website: www.koreanpc.kr
- Medals Ranked 22nd: Gold 137 Silver 132 Bronze 138 Total 407

Summer appearances
- 1968; 1972; 1976; 1980; 1984; 1988; 1992; 1996; 2000; 2004; 2008; 2012; 2016; 2020; 2024

Winter appearances
- 1992; 1994; 1998; 2002; 2006; 2010; 2014; 2018; 2022; 2026

The Republic of Korea (South Korea) first participated at the Paralympic Games in 1968, and has sent athletes to compete in every Summer Paralympic Games since then. South Korea has also participated in every Winter Paralympic Games since the 1992 Games.

With 343 medals, of which 126 gold, 108 silver and 109 bronze, South Korea (following the 2016 Summer Paralympics) has been ranked among the top twenty nations around the world in the all-time Paralympic Games medal tally.

== Medals ==
=== Medals by Summer Games ===
Games	Gold	Silver	Bronze	Total
1968 Tel-Aviv	0	0	0	0
1972 Heidelberg	4	2	1	7
1976 Toronto	1	2	1	4
1980 Arnhem	2	2	1	5
1984 Stoke Mandeville and New York City	0	2	2	4
1988 Seoul*	40	35	19	94
1992 Barcelona	11	15	18	44
1996 Atlanta	13	2	15	30
2000 Sydney	18	7	7	32
2004 Athens	11	11	6	28
2008 Beijing	10	8	13	31
2012 London	9	9	9	27
2016 Rio	7	11	17	35
2020 Tokyo	2	10	12	24
2024 Paris	6	10	14	30
Totals (15 entries)	134	126	135	395

=== Medals by Winter Games ===
Games	Gold	Silver	Bronze	Total
1992 Tignes-Albertville	0	0	0	0
1994 Lillehammer	0	0	0	0
1998 Nagano	0	0	0	0
2002 Salt Lake City	0	1	0	1
2006 Turin	0	0	0	0
2010 Vancouver-Whistler	0	1	0	1
2014 Sochi	0	0	0	0
2018 PyeongChang*	1	0	2	3
2022 Beijing	0	0	0	0
2026 Milan Cortina	2	4	1	7
Totals (10 entries)	3	6	3	12

=== Medals by Summer Sport ===
Games	Gold	Silver	Bronze	Total
Archery	15	10	13	38
Athletics	27	23	21	71
Boccia	10	5	6	20
Cycling	3	6	5	14
Dartchery	0	1	0	1
Judo	4	2	8	14
Lawn Bowls	0	1	2	3
Powerlifting	7	8	5	20
Shooting	23	19	15	57
Swimming	7	2	6	15
Table Tennis	27	35	36	98
Weightlifting	2	0	1	3
Wheelchair Fencing	3	1	1	5
Total	128	116	121	365

=== Medals by Winter Sport ===
Games	Gold	Silver	Bronze	Total
Alpine skiing	0	1	0	1
Biathlon	1	1	0	2
Cross-country skiing	2	2	1	5
Para ice hockey	0	0	1	1
Snowboarding	0	0	1	1
Wheelchair curling	0	2	0	2
Total	3	6	3	12

== Multi-medalists ==
South Korean athletes who have won at least three gold medals or five or more medals of any colour.

No.	Athlete	Sport	Years	Games	Gender	Gold	Silver	Bronze	Total
1	Lee Hae-gon	Table tennis	1988-2008	6	M	7	1	4	12
2	Kim Young-gun	Table tennis	2004-2024	6	M	5	2	0	7
3	Kim Kyung-mook	Table tennis	1992-2016	6	M	4	3	6	13
4	Jeong Ho-won	Boccia	2008-2024	5	M	4	2	1	7
5	Kim Du-chun	Athletics	1988-2000	4	M	4	1	1	6
6	Hong Suk-man	Athletics	2004-2012	3	M	3	1	3	7
7	Kim Byoung-young	Table tennis	2000-2008	3	M	3	1	0	4
8	Park Sea-kyun	Shooting	2008-2012	2	M	3	0	0	3
9	Jung Eun-chang	Table tennis	2000-2012	4	M	2	4	1	7
10	Kim Yun-ji	Biathlon; Cross-country skiing	2026	1	F	2	3	0	5
11	Choi Kyoung-sik	Table tennis	2000-2008	3	M	2	2	1	5
12	Seo Su-yeon	Table tennis	2016-2024	3	F	0	4	2	6

== See also ==
- Category:Paralympic competitors for South Korea
- South Korea at the Asian Para Games
- South Korea at the Olympics
- South Korea at the Asian Games
