= Kim Young-tae =

South Korean weightlifter

Personal information
- Nationality: South Korean
- Born: 15 May 1975 (age 50)

Sport
- Sport: Weightlifting

Kim Young-tae (born 15 May 1975) is a South Korean weightlifter. He competed in the men's featherweight event at the 2000 Summer Olympics.
