= Audrey Lemieux =

Canadian cyclist

Personal information
- Born: 9 May 1985 (age 41) Canada

Cycling career
- Sport: Cycling
- Disciplines: Road cycling Para-cycling (guide)

Professional teams
- 2007: Team Expresscopy.com
- 2008–2010: Esgl 93-Gsd Gestion
Medal record
Paracycling (guide)
Representing Canada
Parapan American Games
Gold medal – first place	2015 Toronto	Mixed Time Trial B

Audrey Lemieux (born 9 May 1985) is a road cyclist from Canada. She represented her nation at the 2005 UCI Road World Championships. Lemieux joined Canada's para-cycling program in 2014 after a 12-year road-racing career. Before switching to para-cycling, she was a five-time Canadian champion between 2002 and 2005, competed at the 2005 UCI Road World Championships, and was a member of Canada's team at the 2006 Commonwealth Games.
