= South Korea at the 2000 Summer Paralympics =

- IPC code: KOR
- NPC: Korean Paralympic Committee
- Website: www.kosad.or.kr (in Korean)

in Sydney
- Competitors: 89 (82 male, 7 female)
- Medals Ranked 9th: Gold 18 Silver 7 Bronze 7 Total 32

Summer Paralympics appearances (overview)
- 1968; 1972; 1976; 1980; 1984; 1988; 1992; 1996; 2000; 2004; 2008; 2012; 2016; 2020; 2024

There were 7 female and 82 male athletes representing the country at the 2000 Summer Paralympics.

== Medal table ==
Medal	Name	Sport	Event
Gold	Tae Sung An	Archery	Men's individual standing
Gold	Hong Gu Lee	Archery	Men's individual W2
Gold	Jung Hoon Moon	Athletics	Men's 400m T53
Gold	Yong Jin Choi	Athletics	Men's 1500m T36
Gold	Keun Ho Goo; Hae Ryong Kim; Lee Jin-woo; Jung Ho Lee	Boccia	Mixed team BC1-BC2
Gold	Yong Sik Jin	Cycling	Mixed bicycle time trial CP div 3
Gold	Keum Jong Jung	Powerlifting	Men's -52 kg
Gold	Jong Chul Park	Powerlifting	Men's -82.5 kg
Gold	Hee Jeong Lee	Shooting	Men's air pistol SH1
Gold	Jin Owan Jung	Shooting	Men's air rifle standing SH1
Gold	Im Yeon Kim	Shooting	Women's air rifle standing SH1
Gold	Im Yeon Kim	Shooting	Women's sport rifle 3x20 SH1
Gold	Jong In Choi	Shooting	Mixed free pistol SH1
Gold	Hae Gon Lee	Table tennis	Men's singles 1
Gold	Kyung Mook Kim	Table tennis	Men's singles 2
Gold	Seong Hoon Kang; Hae Gon Lee; Kong Yong Kim; Kyung Mook Kim	Table tennis	Men's teams 1-2
Gold	Eun Chang Jung; Byoung Young Kim	Table tennis	Men's teams 5
Gold	Kwang Jin Kim; Cheon Sik Lee	Table tennis	Men's teams 8
Silver	Young Joo Jung	Archery	Men's individual W2
Silver	Yong Jin Choi	Athletics	Men's 800m T36
Silver	Lee Jin-woo	Boccia	Mixed individual BC2
Silver	Jung Yong Kwak	Powerlifting	Men's -48 kg
Silver	Kong Yong Kim	Table tennis	Men's singles 2
Silver	Tae Hyung Um	Table tennis	Men's singles 4
Silver	Tae Hyung Um; Park Jun-young; Kyoung Sik Choi	Table tennis	Men's teams 4
Bronze	Hong Gu Lee; Ouk Soo Lee; Hyun Kwan Cho	Archery	Men's team open
Bronze	Hee Sook Ko	Archery	Women's individual W1/W2
Bronze	Yong Sik Jin	Cycling	Mixed bicycle road race CP div 3
Bronze	Yu Sung An	Judo	Men's -90 kg
Bronze	Jin Owan Jung	Shooting	Men's free rifle 3x40 SH1
Bronze	Kyoung Sik Choi	Table tennis	Men's singles 4
Bronze	Heung Sik Yang; Ji Yong Son; Young Soo Kim	Table tennis	Men's teams 3

== See also ==
- South Korea at the Paralympics
- South Korea at the 2000 Summer Olympics

== Bibliography ==
- International Paralympic Committee (2000). "Appendix C: Athlete Numbers - By Delegation". Sydney 2000 Paralympic Games Post Games Report. Sydney.
