= Novice round open medalists =

The novice round open was only held in the 1976 Summer Paralympics. Both men and women competed.

== Men's novice round open ==
Event	Gold	Silver	Bronze
1976 Toronto	J. M. Chapuis; France	A. Galea; France	Jack Hautle; Switzerland

== Men's novice and tetraplegics round team A-C ==
Event	Gold	Silver	Bronze
1976 Toronto	France (FRA)	Switzerland (SUI)	United States (USA)

== Women's novice round open ==
Event	Gold	Silver	Bronze
1976 Toronto	Tomoko Yamazaki; Japan	R. Alexander; South Africa	Noreen Vollbach; United States
