= Erica Gavel =

Canadian wheelchair basketball player

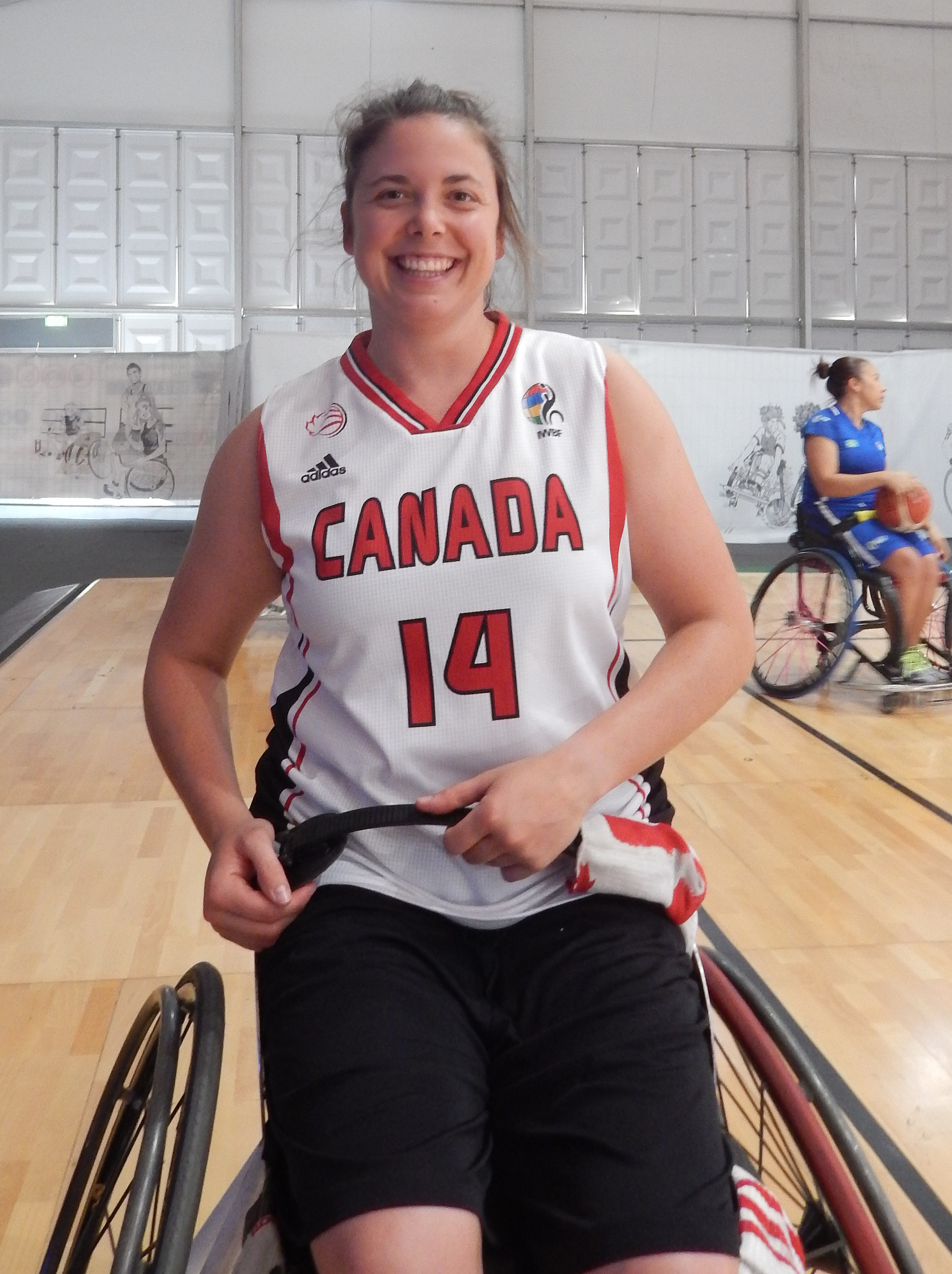
- Team Canada – Erica Gavel

Personal information
- Nationality: Canada
- Born: May 25, 1991 (age 35) Prince Albert, Saskatchewan
- Height: 180 cm (5 ft 11 in)

Sport
- Sport: Wheelchair basketball
- Disability class: 4.5
- Event: Women's team
- College team: University of Alabama
- Coached by: Bill Johnson
Medal record
Women's wheelchair basketball
Representing Canada
Parapan American Games
Gold medal – first place	2019 Lima	Team
Silver medal – second place	2015 Toronto	Team

Erica Gavel (born May 25, 1991) is a Canadian 4.5 point wheelchair basketball player who won a silver medal at the 2015 Parapan American Games in Toronto. In 2016, she was selected as part of the team for the 2016 Summer Paralympics in Rio de Janeiro.

== Biography ==
Erica Gavel was born in Prince Albert, Saskatchewan, on May 25, 1991. She attended Carlton Comprehensive High School, where she was a promising basketball player. She went on to play for the University of Saskatchewan Huskies. Towards the end of her first year, she suffered a serious knee injury that required surgery. Like most young and fit people, she recovered quickly, and was ready to play again at the start of her second year. She played for most of the season but then tore her cartilage in the same knee. This benched her for 18 months. She had no sooner recovered than she injured the knee a third time. This time it required microfracture surgery. There was no cartilage between her femur and tibia. Doctors told her that she would never play competitive sport again.

Gavel remembered that a classmate played wheelchair basketball, and decided to give it a try. She was classified as a 4.5 point player. On March 30, 2014, Gavel led Team Saskatchewan to their first Junior National Championship. Her passion and performance earned her a five-year athletic scholarship to play at the University of Alabama Crimson Tide, which was placed second in the National Intercollegiate Championship in 2014. Gavel was named the team's Most Improved Player. That year she selected for the Canadian national team, which went on to win Silver at 2015 Parapan American Games in Toronto, Ontario). In 2016, she was selected as part of the side for the 2016 Summer Paralympic Games in Rio de Janeiro.

When Canadian professional sports started resuming play during the 2020 Covid-19 Pandemic, Gavel advocated for women's sports and specifically athletes with disabilities be considered when designing and funding precautionary measures.

In 2023, Gavel was elected chair of Canadian Paralympic Athletes' Council.

== Awards ==
- 2015 – Silver at 2015 Parapan American Games (Toronto, Ontario)
- 2023 - The Prince Albert Sports Hall of Fame (Prince Albert, Saskatchewan)
