= Kirstie Kasko =

Canadian Paralympic swimmer (born 1992)

Personal information
- Born: October 13, 1992 (age 33) High River, AB, Canada
- Education: Northwest College; Red Deer College; Holy Trinity Academy
- Height: 1.67 m (5 ft 6 in)
- Weight: 65 kg (143 lb)

Sport
- Country: Canada
- Sport: Paralympic swimming
- Disability: Intellectual impairment
- Disability class: S14
- Club: Okotoks Masters Swim Club
Medal record
Paralympic swimming
Representing Canada
INAS Global Games
Bronze medal – third place	2011 Liguria	Women's 200m backstroke
Parapan American Games
Gold medal – first place	2011 Guadalajara	Women's 200m freestyle S14
Gold medal – first place	2011 Guadalajara	Women's 100m backstroke S14
Silver medal – second place	2015 Toronto	Women's 200m freestyle S14
Silver medal – second place	2015 Toronto	Women's 100m backstrokes S14
Silver medal – second place	2015 Toronto	Women's 200m individual medley SM14
Bronze medal – third place	2015 Toronto	Women's 100m breaststroke SB14

Kirstie Kasko (born October 13, 1992) is a Canadian Paralympic swimmer who competes in international level events.

Kasko took a break from swimming in 2014 when she had blackouts and epileptic seizures at a swimming pool in Calgary. She was diagnosed with epilepsy at age 21. However this was not a surprise as Kirstie had six grand mal seizures at age 2.
