= Jean-Michel Lavallière =

Canadian para swimmer

Personal information
- Born: December 10, 1990 (age 35) Quebec City, Quebec, Canada
- Height: 173 cm (5 ft 8 in)

Sport
- Country: Canada
- Sport: Para swimming
- Disability: Cerebral palsy
- Disability class: S7
- Retired: 2018
- Club: High Performance Centre – Québec
- Coach: Mike Thompson
Medal record
Men's para swimming
Representing Canada
Parapan American Games
Silver medal – second place	2015 Toronto	50m freestyle S7
Silver medal – second place	2015 Toronto	50m butterfly S7
Silver medal – second place	2015 Toronto	100m freestyle S7
Silver medal – second place	2015 Toronto	200m individual medley SM7
Silver medal – second place	2015 Toronto	4x100m freestyle relay
Silver medal – second place	2015 Toronto	4x100m medley relay

Jean-Michel Lavallière (born December 10, 1990) is a Canadian retired para swimmer who competed at international swimming competitions. He is a six-time Parapan American Games silver medalist and has competed at the 2016 Summer Paralympics and 2018 Commonwealth Games.

Lavallière announced his retirement shortly after the 2018 Commonwealth Games due to planning to complete his university studies at Laval University.
