= Adam Purdy =

Canadian Paralympic swimmer

Personal information
- Born: 22 January 1981 (age 45) London, Ontario, Canada
- Education: University of Prince Edward Island
- Height: 170 cm (5 ft 7 in)

Sport
- Country: Canada
- Sport: Paralympic swimming
- Disability: Arthrogryposis
- Disability class: S6
- Club: London Aquatics Club
- Coached by: Andrew Craven; Craig McCord
- Retired: 2016
Medal record
Paralympic swimming
Representing Canada
Paralympic Games
Gold medal – first place	2000 Sydney	Men's 100m backstroke S6
Gold medal – first place	2000 Sydney	Men's 4x100m medley relay
World Championships
Gold medal – first place	1998 Christchurch	Men's 100m backstroke S6
Gold medal – first place	1998 Christchurch	Men's 4x100m medley open
Bronze medal – third place	1998 Christchurch	Men's 200m individual medley SM6
Parapan American Games
Silver medal – second place	2015 Toronto	Men's 100m backstroke S6
Bronze medal – third place	2015 Toronto	Men's 50m butterfly S6
Bronze medal – third place	2015 Toronto	Mixed 4x50m freestyle relay

Adam Purdy (born 22 January 1981) is a retired Canadian Paralympic swimmer. He is a double Paralympic champion, double World champion and four-time Parapan American Games medalist. He works for a Danish IT company, KIMIK iT, which provides a web-based hosting platform for sporting events.
