= Isaac Bouckley =

Canadian Paralympic swimmer (born 1994)

Personal information
- Born: 18 April 1994 (age 32) Oshawa, Ontario, Canada
- Home town: Port Hope, Ontario
- Height: 1.72 m (5 ft 8 in)
- Weight: 70 kg (154 lb)

Sport
- Country: Canada
- Sport: Paralympic swimming
- Disability: Club foot
- Disability class: S10
- Retired: 2017
Medal record
Paralympic swimming
Representing Canada
Parapan American Games
Silver medal – second place	2015 Toronto	400m freestyle S10
Silver medal – second place	2015 Toronto	100m breaststroke SB10

Isaac Bouckley (born 18 April 1994) is a Canadian retired Paralympic swimmer who competed at international swimming competitions. He is a double Parapan American Games silver medalist and competed at the 2012 and 2016 Summer Paralympics.
