= Alec Denys =

Archer that gave canada a pride in archery

Personal information
- Born: 19 July 1951 (age 73); Douro-Dummer, Ontario, Canada

Sport
- Country: Canada
- Sport: Para archery
- Disability: Spinal cord injury
- Coached by: Vladimir Kopecky
- Retired: 2004

Alec Denys (born July 19, 1951) is a Canadian retired archer who competed in international archery competitions. He competed at five Paralympic Games from 1984 to 2000, his highest achievement was reaching the quarterfinals at the 1992 and 2000 Summer Paralympics.

Denys began archery in 1982 when he competed at the Ontario Games for the Physically Disabled.
