= Korean Paralympic Committee =

National Paralympic Committee of Korea

National Paralympic Committee
- Country: South Korea
- Code: KOR
- Created: May 12, 2006
- Recognized: 2006
- Continental association: APC
- Headquarters: Olympic Park, Seoul
- President: Jin Owan Jung
- Secretary General: Jeon Hye-ja
- Website: koreanpc.kr

Korean Paralympic Committee (KPC; Korean: 대한장애인체육회; Hanja: 大韓障碍人體育會; RR: Daehan Jangaein Cheyughoe; lit. Korea Sports Association for the Disabled) is a National Paralympic Committee (NPC) of South Korea. The committee was established on May 12, 2006, and is recognized by International Paralympic Committee (IPC) and Asian Paralympic Committee (APC).

== See also ==
- Korean Sport & Olympic Committee
- Disabled sports
- South Korea at the Paralympics
- South Korea women's national goalball team
