= Swimming at the 2016 Summer Paralympics – Men's 200 metre freestyle S4 =

Event at the 2016 Paralympic Games

Men's 200 metre freestyle S4 at the XV Paralympic Games
- Venue: Olympic Aquatics Stadium
- Dates: 13 September 2016
- Competitors: 11 from 9 nations

Medalists
1st place, gold medalist(s)		Giseong Jo	South Korea
2nd place, silver medalist(s)		Michael Schoenmaker	Netherlands
3rd place, bronze medalist(s)		Zhipeng Jin	China

The men's 200 metre freestyle S4 event at the 2016 Paralympic Games took place on 13 September 2016, at the Olympic Aquatics Stadium. Two heats were held. The swimmers with the eight fastest times advanced to the final.

== Heats ==
=== Heat 1 ===
11:51 13 September 2016:

Rank	Lane	Name	Nationality	Time	Notes
1	4	Michael Schoenmaker	Netherlands	3:05.13	Q
2	5	Gustavo Sanchez Martinez	Mexico	3:09.56	Q
3	6	Jan Povysil	Czech Republic	3:13.02	Q
4	3	Zhipeng Jin	China	3:13.42	Q
5	2	Yuntao Liu	China	3:42.10	

=== Heat 2 ===
11:58 13 September 2016:

Rank	Lane	Name	Nationality	Time	Notes
1	4	Giseong Jo	South Korea	3:03.64	Q
2	3	Darko Duric	Slovenia	3:05.03	Q
3	5	David Smetanine	France	3:05.38	Q
4	6	Andrii Derevinskyi	Ukraine	3:18.59	Q
5	2	Jesús Hernández Hernández	Mexico	3:25.76	
6	7	Nelson Lopes	Portugal	3:51.29	

== Final ==
20:30 13 September 2016:

Rank	Lane	Name	Nationality	Time	Notes
1st place, gold medalist(s)	4	Giseong Jo	South Korea	3:01.67	
2nd place, silver medalist(s)	3	Michael Schoenmaker	Netherlands	3:03.81	
3rd place, bronze medalist(s)	1	Zhipeng Jin	China	3:03.94	
4	5	Darko Duric	Slovenia	3:05.02	
5	6	David Smetanine	France	3:06.39	
6	2	Gustavo Sanchez Martinez	Mexico	3:10.58	
7	7	Jan Povysil	Czech Republic	3:15.72	
8	8	Andrii Derevinskyi	Ukraine	3:17.53	
