= Swimming at the 2012 Summer Paralympics – Men's 200 metre freestyle S4 =

Event at the 2012 Summer Paralympics

Men's 200m Freestyle S4 at the XIV Paralympic Games
- Venue: London Aquatics Centre
- Dates: 8 September 2012
- Competitors: 12 from 11 nations
- Winning time: 2:58.09

Medalists
1st place, gold medalist(s)		Gustavo Sánchez Martínez	Mexico
2nd place, silver medalist(s)		David Smétanine	France
3rd place, bronze medalist(s)		Richard Oribe	Spain

The men's 200m freestyle S4 event at the 2012 Summer Paralympics took place at the London Aquatics Centre on 8 September. There were two heats; the swimmers with the eight fastest times advanced to the final.

== Results ==
=== Heats ===
Competed from 11:31.

==== Heat 1 ====
Rank	Lane	Name	Nationality	Time	Notes
1	4	Gustavo Sánchez Martínez	Mexico	3:02.79	Q
2	6	Kim Kyunghyun	South Korea	3:05.65	Q
3	3	Christoffer Lindhe	Sweden	3:06.60	Q
4	2	Arnost Petracek	Czech Republic	3:39.58	
5	7	Michael Demarco	United States	4:31.31	
	5	Jan Povysil	Czech Republic	DNS	

==== Heat 2 ====
Rank	Lane	Name	Nationality	Time	Notes
1	4	David Smétanine	France	3:03.82	Q
2	5	Richard Oribe	Spain	3:05.71	Q
3	6	Darko Duric	Slovenia	3:06.75	Q
4	3	Michael Schoenmaker	Netherlands	3:14.16	Q
5	2	Eskender Mustafaiev	Ukraine	3:26.92	Q
6	7	Ronystony Cordeiro da Silva	Brazil	3:55.54	

=== Final ===
Competed at 19:58.

Rank	Lane	Name	Nationality	Time	Notes
1st place, gold medalist(s)	4	Gustavo Sánchez Martínez	Mexico	2:58.09	AM
2nd place, silver medalist(s)	5	David Smétanine	France	3:01.38	
3rd place, bronze medalist(s)	6	Richard Oribe	Spain	3:01.62	
4	7	Darko Duric	Slovenia	3:06.84	
5	2	Christoffer Lindhe	Sweden	3:07.02	
6	3	Kim Kyunghyun	South Korea	3:07.74	
7	1	Michael Schoenmaker	Netherlands	3:12.22	
8	8	Eskender Mustafaiev	Ukraine	3:21.12	

'Q = qualified for final. AM = Americas Record. DNS = Did not start.
