= Swimming at the 2016 Summer Paralympics – Men's 150 metre individual medley SM4 =

Men's 150 metre individual medley SM4 at the XV Paralympic Games
- Venue: Olympic Aquatics Stadium
- Dates: 12 September 2016
- Competitors: 10 from 10 nations

Medalists
1st place, gold medalist(s)		Cameron Leslie	New Zealand
2nd place, silver medalist(s)		Zhipeng Jin	China
3rd place, bronze medalist(s)		Jonas Larsen	Denmark

The Men's 150 metre individual medley SM4 event at the 2016 Paralympic Games took place on 12 September 2016, at the Olympic Aquatics Stadium. Two heats were held. The swimmers with the eight fastest times advanced to the final.

== Heats ==
=== Heat 1 ===
9:59 12 September 2016:

Rank	Lane	Name	Nationality	Time	Notes
1	4	Jonas Larsen	Denmark	2:35.95	Q
2	3	Efrem Morelli	Italy	2:41.32	Q
3	5	Takayuki Suzuki	Japan	2:43.15	Q
4	6	Gustavo Sanchez Martinez	Mexico	2:46.34	Q
5	2	Andrii Derevinskyi	Ukraine	3:14.21	

=== Heat 2 ===
10:05 12 September 2016:

Rank	Lane	Name	Nationality	Time	Notes
1	4	Cameron Leslie	New Zealand	2:29.36	Q
2	5	Zhipeng Jin	China	2:32.86	Q
3	3	Jan Povysil	Czech Republic	2:45.72	Q
4	6	Miguel Luque	Spain	2:47.33	Q
5	2	Ahmed Kelly	Australia	3:07.81	

== Final ==
17:50 12 September 2016:

Rank	Lane	Name	Nationality	Time	Notes
1st place, gold medalist(s)	4	Cameron Leslie	New Zealand	2:23.12	WR
2nd place, silver medalist(s)	5	Zhipeng Jin	China	2:26.91	
3rd place, bronze medalist(s)	3	Jonas Larsen	Denmark	2:33.67	
4	2	Takayuki Suzuki	Japan	2:38.71	
5	6	Efrem Morelli	Italy	2:43.75	
6	8	Miguel Luque	Spain	2:45.34	
7	7	Jan Povysil	Czech Republic	2:45.79	
8	1	Gustavo Sanchez Martinez	Mexico	2:54.95	
