= Swimming at the 2016 Summer Paralympics – Men's 50 metre backstroke S4 =

Event at the 2016 Summer Paralympics

Men's 50 metre backstroke S4 at the XV Paralympic Games
- Venue: Olympic Aquatics Stadium
- Dates: 16 September 2016
- Competitors: 11 from 8 nations

Medalists
| 1st place, gold medalist(s) | | Arnost Petracek | Czech Republic |
| 2nd place, silver medalist(s) | | Yuntao Liu | China |
| 3rd place, bronze medalist(s) | | Jesús Hernández Hernández | Mexico |

The Men's 50 metre backstroke S4 event at the 2016 Paralympic Games took place on 16 September 2016, at the Olympic Aquatics Stadium. Two heats were held. The swimmers with the eight fastest times advanced to the final.

== Heats ==
=== Heat 1 ===
10:16 16 September 2016:

| Rank | Lane | Name | Nationality | Time | Notes |
|---|---|---|---|---|---|
| 1 | 4 | Juan Reyes | Mexico | 45.96 | Q |
| 2 | 3 | Jan Povysil | Czech Republic | 48.00 | Q |
| 3 | 5 | Ronystony Cordeiro | Brazil | 49.07 | Q |
| 4 | 6 | Efrem Morelli | Italy | 49.75 | Q |
| 5 | 2 | Somchai Doungkaew | Thailand | 55.21 | |

=== Heat 2 ===
10:19 16 September 2016:

| Rank | Lane | Name | Nationality | Time | Notes |
|---|---|---|---|---|---|
| 1 | 4 | Arnost Petracek | Czech Republic | 43.69 | Q |
| 2 | 6 | Yuntao Liu | China | 44.42 | Q |
| 3 | 5 | Jesús Hernández Hernández | Mexico | 44.49 | Q |
| 4 | 3 | Gustavo Sanchez Martinez | Mexico | 47.95 | Q |
| 5 | 2 | Nelson Lopes | Portugal | 53.51 | |
| 6 | 7 | Ahmed Kelly | Australia | 59.55 | |

== Final ==
18:23 16 September 2016:

| Rank | Lane | Name | Nationality | Time | Notes |
|---|---|---|---|---|---|
| 1st place, gold medalist(s) | 4 | Arnost Petracek | Czech Republic | 43.12 | |
| 2nd place, silver medalist(s) | 5 | Yuntao Liu | China | 45.01 | |
| 3rd place, bronze medalist(s) | 3 | Jesús Hernández Hernández | Mexico | 45.30 | |
| 4 | 6 | Juan Reyes | Mexico | 45.46 | |
| 5 | 7 | Jan Povysil | Czech Republic | 46.21 | |
| 6 | 2 | Gustavo Sanchez Martinez | Mexico | 49.41 | |
| 7 | 1 | Ronystony Cordeiro | Brazil | 50.84 | |
| 8 | 8 | Efrem Morelli | Italy | 52.54 | |
