= Swimming at the 2016 Summer Paralympics – Men's 50 metre freestyle S4 =

Men's 50 metre freestyle S4 at the XV Paralympic Games
- Venue: Olympic Aquatics Stadium
- Dates: 17 September 2016
- Competitors: 8 from 7 nations

Medalists
1st place, gold medalist(s)		Jo Giseong	South Korea
2nd place, silver medalist(s)		David Smétanine	France
3rd place, bronze medalist(s)		Andrii Derevinskyi	Ukraine

The men's 50 metre freestyle S4 event at the 2016 Paralympic Games took place on 17 September 2016, at the Olympic Aquatics Stadium. No heats were held. The swimmers with the eight fastest times advanced to the final.

== Final ==
18:26 17 September 2016:

Rank	Lane	Name	Nationality	Time	Notes
1st place, gold medalist(s)	4	Giseong Jo	South Korea	39.30	
2nd place, silver medalist(s)	5	David Smétanine	France	40.58	
3rd place, bronze medalist(s)	7	Andrii Derevinskyi	Ukraine	40.94	
4	2	Darko Duric	Slovenia	41.21	
5	8	Arnošt Petráček	Czech Republic	41.55	
6	3	Gustavo Sanchez Martinez	Mexico	41.99	
7	1	Jan Povýšil	Czech Republic	42.73	
8	6	Ronystony Cordeiro	Brazil	43.51	
