= Swimming at the 2012 Summer Paralympics – Men's 100 metre freestyle S4 =

Event at the 2012 Summer Paralympics

Men's 100m Freestyle S4 at the XIV Paralympic Games
- Venue: London Aquatics Centre
- Dates: 5 September 2012
- Competitors: 16 from 13 nations
- Winning time: 1:24.28

Medalists
1st place, gold medalist(s)		Gustavo Sánchez Martínez	Mexico
2nd place, silver medalist(s)		Richard Oribe	Spain
3rd place, bronze medalist(s)		David Smétanine	France

The men's 100m freestyle S4 event at the 2012 Summer Paralympics took place at the London Aquatics Centre on 5 September. There were two heats; the swimmers with the eight fastest times advanced to the final.

== Results ==
=== Heats ===
Competed from 11:46.

==== Heat 1 ====
Rank	Lane	Name	Nationality	Time	Notes
1	4	Gustavo Sánchez Martínez	Mexico	1:24.79	Q
2	3	Eskender Mustafaiev	Ukraine	1:27.44	Q
3	6	Michael Schoenmaker	Netherlands	1:30.23	Q
4	5	Kim Kyunghyun	South Korea	1:31.03	
5	7	Arnost Petracek	Czech Republic	1:36.66	
6	2	Andrey Meshcheryakov	Russia	1:40.66	
7	8	Mark Chirino	Venezuela	2:06.34	
8	1	Ahmed Kelly	Australia	2:10.72	

==== Heat 2 ====
Rank	Lane	Name	Nationality	Time	Notes
1	4	David Smétanine	France	1:24.66	Q
2	5	Richard Oribe	Spain	1:25.25	Q
3	2	Darko Duric	Slovenia	1:26.93	Q
4	6	Christoffer Lindhe	Sweden	1:29.11	Q
5	3	Jan Povysil	Czech Republic	1:29.55	Q
6	7	Aleksei Lyzhikhin	Russia	1:39.39	
7	1	Ronystony Cordeiro da Silva	Brazil	1:48.16	
8	8	Grant Patterson	Australia	1:54.53	

=== Final ===
Competed at 20:51.

Rank	Lane	Name	Nationality	Time	Notes
1st place, gold medalist(s)	5	Gustavo Sánchez Martínez	Mexico	1:24.28	AM
2nd place, silver medalist(s)	3	Richard Oribe	Spain	1:25.33	
3rd place, bronze medalist(s)	4	David Smétanine	France	1:25.76	
4	2	Eskender Mustafaiev	Ukraine	1:25.82	
5	6	Darko Duric	Slovenia	1:26.12	
6	7	Christoffer Lindhe	Sweden	1:28.06	
7	1	Jan Povysil	Czech Republic	1:28.39	
8	8	Michael Schoenmaker	Netherlands	1:28.63	

Q = qualified for final. AM = Americas Record.
