= Swimming at the 2016 Summer Paralympics – Men's 100 metre freestyle S4 =

Men's 100 metre freestyle S4 at the XV Paralympic Games
- Venue: Olympic Aquatics Stadium
- Dates: 8 September 2016
- Competitors: 10 from 9 nations

Medalists
1st place, gold medalist(s)		Giseong Jo	South Korea
2nd place, silver medalist(s)		Zhipeng Jin	China
3rd place, bronze medalist(s)		Michael Schoenmaker	Netherlands

The Men's 100 metre freestyle S4 event at the 2016 Paralympic Games took place on 8 September 2016, at the Olympic Aquatics Stadium. Two heats were held. The swimmers with the eight fastest times advanced to the final.

== Heats ==
=== Heat 1 ===
10:32 8 September 2016:

Rank	Lane	Name	Nationality	Time	Notes
1	3	Zhipeng Jin	China	1:26.77	Q
2	5	Michael Schoenmaker	Netherlands	1:28.96	Q
3	4	Gustavo Sanchez Martinez	Mexico	1:30.06	Q
4	6	Jan Povysil	Czech Republic	1:33.23	Q
5	2	Arnost Petracek	Czech Republic	1:37.52	

=== Heat 2 ===
10:37 8 September 2016:

Rank	Lane	Name	Nationality	Time	Notes
1	4	Giseong Jo	South Korea	1:26.82	Q
2	5	David Smetanine	France	1:28.10	Q
3	3	Darko Duric	Slovenia	1:28.26	Q
4	6	Andrii Derevinskyi	Ukraine	1:30.36	Q
5	2	Vincenzo Boni	Italy	1:39.66	

== Final ==
18:33 8 September 2016:

Rank	Lane	Name	Nationality	Time	Notes
1st place, gold medalist(s)	5	Giseong Jo	South Korea	1:23.36	
2nd place, silver medalist(s)	4	Zhipeng Jin	China	1:26.05	
3rd place, bronze medalist(s)	2	Michael Schoenmaker	Netherlands	1:26.87	
4	3	David Smetanine	France	1:26.88	
5	6	Darko Duric	Slovenia	1:27.17	
6	7	Gustavo Sanchez Martinez	Mexico	1:28.57	
7	1	Andrii Derevinskyi	Ukraine	1:30.59	
8	8	Jan Povysil	Czech Republic	1:34.26	
