= Swimming at the 2004 Summer Paralympics – Men's 100 metre freestyle S4 =

Men's 100m Freestyle S4 at the XII Paralympic Games
- Paralympic Swimming
- Venue: Olympic Aquatic Centre
- Dates: 19 September 2004
- Competitors: 13 from 10 nations
- Winning time: 1:19.51

Medalists
1st place, gold medalist(s)		Clodoaldo Silva	Brazil
2nd place, silver medalist(s)		Yuji Hanada	Japan
3rd place, bronze medalist(s)		Ricardo Oribe	Spain

The Men's 100 metre freestyle S4 swimming event at the 2004 Summer Paralympics was competed on 19 September. It was won by Clodoaldo Silva, representing Brazil.

== 1st round ==
Qualified for final round

Heat 1

19 Sept. 2004, morning session

Rank	Athlete	Time	Notes
1	Yuji Hanada (JPN)	1:22.77	PR
2	David Smétanine (FRA)	1:29.53	
3	Luca Mazzone (ITA)	1:39.05	
4	Joe McCarthy (USA)	1:44.66	
5	Joon Sok Seo (BRA)	1:52.73	
	Kestutis Skucas (LTU)	DNS	

Heat 2

19 Sept. 2004, morning session

Rank	Athlete	Time	Notes
1	Clodoaldo Silva (BRA)	1:19.36	WR
2	Ricardo Oribe (ESP)	1:29.38	
3	Jan Povysil (CZE)	1:31.72	
4	Juan Ignacio Reyes (MEX)	1:34.70	
5	Jose Arnulfo Castorena (MEX)	1:44.19	
6	Fotios Zafeiris (GRE)	1:46.95	
7	Gaetan Dautresire (FRA)	1:53.42	

== Final round ==
19 Sept. 2004, evening session

Rank	Athlete	Time	Notes
1st place, gold medalist(s)	Clodoaldo Silva (BRA)	1:19.51	
2nd place, silver medalist(s)	Yuji Hanada (JPN)	1:24.62	
3rd place, bronze medalist(s)	Ricardo Oribe (ESP)	1:26.58	
4	David Smétanine (FRA)	1:28.98	
5	Luca Mazzone (ITA)	1:37.01	
6	Juan Ignacio Reyes (MEX)	1:37.04	
7	Jan Povysil (CZE)	1:38.38	
8	Jose Arnulfo Castorena (MEX)	1:43.09	
