= Swimming at the 2008 Summer Paralympics – Men's 200 metre freestyle S4 =

Men's 200m Freestyle S4 at the XIII Paralympic Games
- Venue: Beijing National Aquatics Center
- Dates: 9 September
- Competitors: 10 from 10 nations
- Winning time: 2:55.81

Medalists
1st place, gold medalist(s)		Richard Oribe	Spain
2nd place, silver medalist(s)		David Smétanine	France
3rd place, bronze medalist(s)		Jan Povysil	Czech Republic

The men's 200m freestyle S4 event at the 2008 Summer Paralympics took place at the Beijing National Aquatics Center on 9 September. There were two heats; the swimmers with the eight fastest times advanced to the final.

== Results ==
=== Heats ===
Competed from 10:02.

==== Heat 1 ====
Rank	Name	Nationality	Time	Notes
1	David Smétanine	France	3:02.09	Q, PR
2	Ivan Khmelnitskiy	Russia	3:16.67	Q
3	Luca Mazzone	Italy	3:36.63	Q
4	Kestutis Skucas	Lithuania	3:55.82	
5	Joon Seo	Brazil	3:59.65	

==== Heat 2 ====
Rank	Name	Nationality	Time	Notes
1	Richard Oribe	Spain	3:00.45	Q, PR
2	Jan Povysil	Czech Republic	3:04.58	Q
3	Christoffer Lindhe	Sweden	3:11.81	Q
4	Juan Reyes	Mexico	3:28.73	Q
5	Stylianos Tsakonas	Greece	3:43.87	Q

=== Final ===
Competed at 18:40.

Rank	Name	Nationality	Time	Notes
1st place, gold medalist(s)	Richard Oribe	Spain	2:55.81	WR
2nd place, silver medalist(s)	David Smétanine	France	3:04.47	
3rd place, bronze medalist(s)	Jan Povysil	Czech Republic	3:06.74	
4	Christoffer Lindhe	Sweden	3:11.84	
5	Luca Mazzone	Italy	3:14.81	
6	Ivan Khmelnitskiy	Russia	3:15.79	
7	Juan Reyes	Mexico	3:25.57	
8	Stylianos Tsakonas	Greece	3:40.20	

Q = qualified for final. WR = World Record. PR = Paralympic Record.
