= Swimming at the 2016 Summer Paralympics – Men's 50 metre breaststroke SB3 =

Men's 50 metre breaststroke SB3 at the XV Paralympic Games
- Venue: Olympic Aquatics Stadium
- Dates: 14 September 2016
- Competitors: 11 from 10 nations

Medalists
1st place, gold medalist(s)		Zhipeng Jin	China
2nd place, silver medalist(s)		Miguel Luque	Spain
3rd place, bronze medalist(s)		Efrem Morelli	Italy

The Men's 50 metre breaststroke SB3 event at the 2016 Paralympic Games took place on 14 September 2016, at the Olympic Aquatics Stadium. Two heats were held. The swimmers with the eight fastest times advanced to the final.

== Heats ==
=== Heat 1 ===
10:26 14 September 2016:

Rank	Lane	Name	Nationality	Time	Notes
1	6	Zhipeng Jin	China	49.52	Q
2	4	Miguel Luque	Spain	49.79	Q
3	5	Jonathan Dieleman	Canada	50.08	Q
4	3	Michael Schoenmaker	Netherlands	52.77	Q
	2	Gustavo Sanchez Martinez	Mexico		DSQ

=== Heat 2 ===
10:32 14 September 2016:

Rank	Lane	Name	Nationality	Time	Notes
1	5	Takayuki Suzuki	Japan	49.71	Q
2	4	Efrem Morelli	Italy	49.88	Q
3	3	Ahmed Kelly	Australia	51.91	Q
4	6	Vicente Gil	Spain	53.07	Q
5	2	Konstantinos Karaouzas	Greece	54.37	
6	7	Jonas Larsen	Denmark	54.77	

== Final ==
19:17 14 September 2016:

Rank	Lane	Name	Nationality	Time	Notes
1st place, gold medalist(s)	4	Zhipeng Jin	China	47.54	WR
2nd place, silver medalist(s)	3	Miguel Luque	Spain	49.47	
3rd place, bronze medalist(s)	6	Efrem Morelli	Italy	49.92	
4	5	Takayuki Suzuki	Japan	49.96	
5	2	Jonathan Dieleman	Canada	50.21	
6	1	Michael Schoenmaker	Netherlands	51.88	
7	7	Ahmed Kelly	Australia	51.90	
8	8	Vicente Gil	Spain	56.56	
