= Swimming at the 2008 Summer Paralympics – Men's 50 metre freestyle S4 =

Men's 50m Freestyle S4 at the XIII Paralympic Games
- Venue: Beijing National Aquatics Center
- Dates: 15 September
- Competitors: 12 from 10 nations
- Winning time: 37.89

Medalists
1st place, gold medalist(s)		David Smétanine	France
2nd place, silver medalist(s)		Richard Oribe	Spain
3rd place, bronze medalist(s)		Jan Povysil	Czech Republic

The men's 50m freestyle S4 event at the 2008 Summer Paralympics took place at the Beijing National Aquatics Center on 15 September. There were two heats; the swimmers with the eight fastest times advanced to the final.

== Results ==
=== Heats ===
Competed from 09:54.

==== Heat 1 ====
Rank	Name	Nationality	Time	Notes
1	Richard Oribe	Spain	39.30	Q
2	Luca Mazzone	Italy	42.47	Q
3	Juan Reyes	Mexico	44.02	Q
4	Stylianos Tsakonas	Greece	44.31	
5	Arnost Petracek	Czech Republic	46.75	
6	Jose Castorena	Mexico	50.79	

==== Heat 2 ====
Rank	Name	Nationality	Time	Notes
1	David Smétanine	France	37.79	Q
2	Jan Povysil	Czech Republic	39.75	Q
3	Joe McCarthy	United States	40.85	Q
4	Christoffer Lindhe	Sweden	43.09	Q
5	Ivan Khmelnitskiy	Russia	44.21	Q
6	Kestutis Skucas	Lithuania	49.56	

=== Final ===
Competed at 18:17.

Rank	Name	Nationality	Time	Notes
1st place, gold medalist(s)	David Smétanine	France	37.89	
2nd place, silver medalist(s)	Richard Oribe	Spain	38.69	
3rd place, bronze medalist(s)	Jan Povysil	Czech Republic	39.35	
4	Luca Mazzone	Italy	39.60	
5	Joe McCarthy	United States	39.95	
6	Christoffer Lindhe	Sweden	42.75	
7	Juan Reyes	Mexico	43.07	
8	Ivan Khmelnitskiy	Russia	43.93	

Q = qualified for final.
