= Swimming at the 2004 Summer Paralympics – Men's 200 metre freestyle S4 =

Men's 200m Freestyle S4 at the XII Paralympic Games
- Paralympic Swimming
- Venue: Olympic Aquatic Centre
- Dates: 21 September 2004
- Competitors: 15 from 9 nations
- Winning time: 2:55.75

Medalists
1st place, gold medalist(s)		Clodoaldo Silva	Brazil
2nd place, silver medalist(s)		Ricardo Oribe	Spain
3rd place, bronze medalist(s)		Yuji Hanada	Japan

The Men's 200 metre freestyle S4 swimming event at the 2004 Summer Paralympics was competed on 21 September. It was won by Clodoaldo Silva, representing Brazil.

== 1st round ==
Qualified for final round

Heat 1

21 Sept. 2004, morning session

Rank	Athlete	Time	Notes
1	Clodoaldo Silva (BRA)	2:58.81	PR
2	Juan Ignacio Reyes (MEX)	3:23.05	
3	Jan Povysil (CZE)	3:24.27	
4	Luca Mazzone (ITA)	3:31.03	
5	Stylianos Tsakonas (GRE)	3:46.12	
6	Gaetan Dautresire (FRA)	3:49.35	
7	Arkaitz Garcia (ESP)	4:05.58	

Heat 2

21 Sept. 2004, morning session

Rank	Athlete	Time	Notes
1	Yuji Hanada (JPN)	3:02.97	
2	Ricardo Oribe (ESP)	3:08.74	
3	David Smétanine (FRA)	3:10.67	
4	Jose Arnulfo Castorena (MEX)	3:40.70	
5	Fotios Zafeiris (GRE)	3:45.52	
6	Kestutis Skucas (LTU)	3:48.21	
7	Joon Sok Seo (BRA)	4:03.00	
8	Ivan Fernandez (ESP)	4:08.83	

== Final round ==
21 Sept. 2004, evening session

Rank	Athlete	Time	Notes
1st place, gold medalist(s)	Clodoaldo Silva (BRA)	2:55.75	WR
2nd place, silver medalist(s)	Ricardo Oribe (ESP)	3:02.25	
3rd place, bronze medalist(s)	Yuji Hanada (JPN)	3:05.65	
4	David Smétanine (FRA)	3:12.81	
5	Jan Povysil (CZE)	3:22.85	
6	Juan Ignacio Reyes (MEX)	3:26.96	
7	Luca Mazzone (ITA)	3:39.05	
8	Jose Arnulfo Castorena (MEX)	3:42.06	
