= Swimming at the 2008 Summer Paralympics – Men's 100 metre freestyle S4 =

Men's 100 metre freestyle S4 at the XIII Paralympic Games
- Venue: Beijing National Aquatics Center
- Dates: September 7
- Competitors: 9 from 9 nations

Medalists
1st place, gold medalist(s)		David Smetanine	France
2nd place, silver medalist(s)		Richard Oribe	Spain
3rd place, bronze medalist(s)		Jan Povysil	Czech Republic

The men's 100 metre freestyle S4 event at the 2008 Paralympic Games took place on September 7, at the Beijing National Aquatics Center.

Two heats were held, with four swimmers in the first heat and five swimmers in the second heat. The swimmers with the eight fastest times advanced to the final; there, they all competed in a single final heat to earn final placements.

== Heats ==
=== Heat 1 ===
Rank	Lane	Name	Nationality	Time	Notes
1	4	Richard Oribe	Spain	1:26.96	Q
2	3	Ivan Khmelnitskiy	Russia	1:32.66	Q
3	5	Luca Mazzone	Italy	1:37.23	Q
4	6	Stylianos Tsakonas	Greece	1:40.63	

=== Heat 2 ===
Rank	Lane	Name	Nationality	Time	Notes
1	4	David Smetanine	France	1:23.87	Q
2	5	Jan Povysil	Czech Republic	1:25.72	Q
3	2	Christoffer Lindhe	Sweden	1:32.98	Q
4	6	Juan Reyes	Mexico	1:36.25	Q
5	3	Joe McCarthy	United States	1:40.19	Q

== Final ==
Rank	Lane	Name	Nationality	Time	Notes
1	4	David Smetanine	France	1:24.67	
2	3	Richard Oribe	Spain	1:26.62	
3	5	Jan Povysil	Czech Republic	1:26.75	
4	6	Christoffer Lindhe	Sweden	1:30.92	
5	1	Luca Mazzone	Italy	1:31.21	
6	2	Ivan Khmelnitskiy	Russia	1:33.37	
7	8	Joe McCarthy	United States	1:34.37	
8	7	Juan Reyes	Mexico	1:37.30	
