= Swimming at the 2004 Summer Paralympics – Men's 50 metre freestyle S4 =

Men's 50m Freestyle S4 at the XII Paralympic Games
- Paralympic Swimming
- Venue: Olympic Aquatic Centre
- Dates: 27 September 2004
- Competitors: 12 from 10 nations
- Winning time: 35.41

Medalists
1st place, gold medalist(s)		Clodoaldo Silva	Brazil
2nd place, silver medalist(s)		Yuji Hanada	Japan
3rd place, bronze medalist(s)		David Smétanine	France

The Men's 50 metre freestyle S4 swimming event at the 2004 Summer Paralympics was competed on 27 September. It was won by Clodoaldo Silva, representing Brazil.

== 1st round ==
Qualified for final round

Heat 1

27 Sept. 2004, morning session

Rank	Athlete	Time	Notes
1	Yuji Hanada (JPN)	38.43	PR
2	David Smétanine (FRA)	41.75	
3	Luca Mazzone (ITA)	43.17	
4	Fotios Zafeiris (GRE)	44.77	
5	Juan Ignacio Reyes (MEX)	45.82	
6	Arkaitz Garcia (ESP)	52.61	

Heat 2

27 Sept. 2004, morning session

Rank	Athlete	Time	Notes
1	Clodoaldo Silva (BRA)	36.40	PR
2	Ricardo Oribe (ESP)	40.31	
3	Jan Povysil (CZE)	41.61	
4	Joe McCarthy (USA)	44.80	
5	Jose Arnulfo Castorena (MEX)	47.72	
	Kestutis Skucas (LTU)	DNS	

== Final round ==
27 Sept. 2004, evening session

Rank	Athlete	Time	Notes
1st place, gold medalist(s)	Clodoaldo Silva (BRA)	35.41	WR
2nd place, silver medalist(s)	Yuji Hanada (JPN)	37.54	
3rd place, bronze medalist(s)	David Smétanine (FRA)	39.51	
4	Ricardo Oribe (ESP)	39.67	
5	Luca Mazzone (ITA)	39.78	
6	Jan Povysil (CZE)	42.33	
7	Joe McCarthy (USA)	44.39	
8	Fotios Zafeiris (GRE)	44.87	
