= Swimming at the 2012 Summer Paralympics – Men's 150 metre individual medley SM4 =

Event at the 2012 Summer Paralympics

Men's 150m Ind. Medley SM4 at the XIV Paralympic Games
- Venue: London Aquatics Centre
- Dates: 2 September 2012
- Competitors: 11 from 10 nations
- Winning time: 2:25.98

Medalists
1st place, gold medalist(s)		Cameron Leslie	New Zealand
2nd place, silver medalist(s)		Gustavo Sánchez Martínez	Mexico
3rd place, bronze medalist(s)		Takayuki Suzuki	Japan

The men's 150-metre individual medley SM4 event at the 2012 Summer Paralympics took place at the London Aquatics Centre on 2 September. There were two heats; the swimmers with the eight fastest times advanced to the final.

== Results ==
=== Heats ===
Competed from 11:04.

==== Heat 1 ====
Rank	Lane	Name	Nationality	Time	Notes
1	4	Jan Povysil	Czech Republic	2:43.33	Q
2	5	Xavier Torres	Spain	2:48.72	Q
3	2	Aleksei Lyzhikhin	Russia	2:51.85	Q
4	7	Ahmed Kelly	Australia	3:08.32	
	3	Michael Schoenmaker	Netherlands	DSQ	

==== Heat 2 ====
Rank	Lane	Name	Nationality	Time	Notes
1	4	Cameron Leslie	New Zealand	2:32.96	Q, PR
2	3	Gustavo Sánchez Martínez	Mexico	2:37.48	Q, AM
3	5	Takayuki Suzuki	Japan	2:41.12	Q
4	2	Jonas Larsen	Denmark	2:47.11	Q
5	6	Miguel Luque	Spain	2:49.31	Q
6	7	Nicolo Bensi	Italy	3:04.41	

=== Final ===
Competed at 19:30.

Rank	Lane	Name	Nationality	Time	Notes
1st place, gold medalist(s)	4	Cameron Leslie	New Zealand	2:25.98	WR
2nd place, silver medalist(s)	5	Gustavo Sánchez Martínez	Mexico	2:39.55	
3rd place, bronze medalist(s)	3	Takayuki Suzuki	Japan	2:40.24	AS
4	6	Jan Povysil	Czech Republic	2:42.01	
5	7	Xavier Torres	Spain	2:42.21	
6	2	Jonas Larsen	Denmark	2:46.15	
7	1	Miguel Luque	Spain	2:48.53	
8	8	Aleksei Lyzhikhin	Russia	2:50.31	

'Q = qualified for final. WR = World Record. PR = Paralympic Record. AM = Americas Record. AS = Asian Record. DSQ = Disqualified.
