= Swimming at the 2012 Summer Paralympics – Men's 50 metre backstroke S4 =

Event at the 2012 Summer Paralympics

Men's 50m Backstroke S4 at the XIV Paralympic Games
- Venue: London Aquatics Centre
- Dates: 6 September 2012
- Competitors: 10 from 8 nations
- Winning time: 45.75

Medalists
1st place, gold medalist(s)		Juan Reyes	Mexico
2nd place, silver medalist(s)		Aleksei Lyzhikhin	Russia
3rd place, bronze medalist(s)		Gustavo Sánchez Martínez	Mexico

The men's 50m backstroke S4 event at the 2012 Summer Paralympics took place at the London Aquatics Centre on 6 September. There were two heats; the swimmers with the eight fastest times advanced to the final.

== Results ==
=== Heats ===
Competed from 10:44.

==== Heat 1 ====
Rank	Lane	Name	Nationality	Time	Notes
1	4	Arnost Petracek	Czech Republic	45.16	Q, EU
2	3	Gustavo Sánchez Martínez	Mexico	46.48	Q
3	5	Jan Povysil	Czech Republic	47.33	Q
4	6	Ronystony Cordeiro da Silva	Brazil	50.95	Q
5	2	Ahmed Kelly	Australia	57.91	

==== Heat 2 ====
Rank	Lane	Name	Nationality	Time	Notes
1	3	Aleksei Lyzhikhin	Russia	46.57	Q
2	4	Juan Reyes	Mexico	47.40	Q
3	5	David Smétanine	France	49.33	Q
4	6	Eskender Mustafaiev	Ukraine	51.92	Q
5	2	Kestutis Skucas	Lithuania	52.38	

=== Final ===
Competed at 18:52.

Rank	Lane	Name	Nationality	Time	Notes
1st place, gold medalist(s)	2	Juan Reyes	Mexico	45.75	
2nd place, silver medalist(s)	3	Aleksei Lyzhikhin	Russia	46.73	
3rd place, bronze medalist(s)	5	Gustavo Sánchez Martínez	Mexico	47.17	
4	6	Jan Povysil	Czech Republic	48.41	
5	4	Arnost Petracek	Czech Republic	49.49	
6	7	David Smétanine	France	50.30	
7	1	Ronystony Cordeiro da Silva	Brazil	51.75	
8	8	Eskender Mustafaiev	Ukraine	52.51	

Q = qualified for final. EU = European Record.
