= Swimming at the 2016 Summer Paralympics – Men's 50 metre breaststroke =

The men's 50 m breaststroke swimming events for the 2016 Summer Paralympics took place at the Olympic Aquatics Stadium from 8 to 17 September. A total of eleven events were contested for different classifications.

== Competition format ==
Each event consisted of two rounds: heats and final. The top eight swimmers overall in the heats progressed to the final. If there were less than eight swimmers in an event, no heats were held and all swimmers qualify for the final.

== Results ==
=== SB2 ===
19:09 14 September 2016:

Rank	Lane	Name	Nationality	Time	Notes
1st place, gold medalist(s)	4	Wenpan Huang	China	50.65	WR
2nd place, silver medalist(s)	5	Tingshen Li	China	51.78	
3rd place, bronze medalist(s)	3	Chaowen Huang	China	54.29	
4	6	Dmytro Vynohradets	Ukraine	55.03	
5	2	Somchai Doungkaew	Thailand	56.52	
6	7	Arnulfo Castorena	Mexico	57.70	
7	8	Ioannis Kostakis	Greece	1:07.48	
	1	Cristopher Tronco	Mexico		DSQ

=== SB3 ===
19:17 14 September 2016:

Rank	Lane	Name	Nationality	Time	Notes
1st place, gold medalist(s)	4	Zhipeng Jin	China	47.54	WR
2nd place, silver medalist(s)	3	Miguel Luque	Spain	49.47	
3rd place, bronze medalist(s)	6	Efrem Morelli	Italy	49.92	
4	5	Takayuki Suzuki	Japan	49.96	
5	2	Jonathan Dieleman	Canada	50.21	
6	1	Michael Schoenmaker	Netherlands	51.88	
7	7	Ahmed Kelly	Australia	51.90	
8	8	Vicente Gil	Spain	56.56	
