= 2018 World Para Swimming European Championships – Men's 50 metres breaststroke =

The men's 50 metres breaststroke at the 2018 World Para Swimming European Championships was held at the National Aquatic Centre in Dublin from 13 to 19 August. A single classification final was held in all over this event.

== Medalists ==
Event	Gold		Silver		Bronze	
SB3	Efrem Morelli (ITA)	49.03	Ami Omer Dadaon (ISR)	55.06	Andreas Ernhoffer (AUT)	59.44
WR world record | AR area record | CR championship record | GR games record | NR national record | OR Olympic record | PB personal best | SB season best | WL world leading (in a given season)

== See also ==
- List of IPC world records in swimming
