= Swimming at the 2015 Parapan American Games – Men's 50 metre freestyle S4 =

Men's 50 metre freestyle S4 at the 2015 Parapan American Games
- Venue: Toronto Pan Am Sports Centre
- Dates: 8 August 2015
- Competitors: 8 from 6 nations
- Winning time: 59.68

Medalists
1st place, gold medalist(s)		Gustavo Sanchez	Mexico
2nd place, silver medalist(s)		Ronystony Cordeiro	Brazil
3rd place, bronze medalist(s)		Juan Reyes	Mexico

The men's S4 50 metres freestyle competition of the swimming events at the 2015 Parapan American Games was held on August 8, 2015 at the Toronto Pan Am Sports Centre.

== Schedule ==
All times are Eastern Standard Time (UTC-5).

Date	Time	Round
8 August	19:26	Final

== Results ==
=== Final ===
Rank	Lane	Name	Nationality	Time	Notes
1st place, gold medalist(s)	4	Gustavo Sanchez	Mexico	40.64	
2nd place, silver medalist(s)	5	Ronystony Cordeiro	Brazil	43.60	
3rd place, bronze medalist(s)	3	Juan Reyes	Mexico	44.23	
4	6	Jesus Hernandez	Mexico	48.78	
5	2	Riley McLean	Canada	58.66	
6	7	Luis Uni	Colombia	1:02.08	
7	1	Gabriel Campero	Venezuela	1:14.55	
8	8	Maximillano Matto	Argentina	1:26.73	
