= Mexico at the 2012 Summer Paralympics =

- IPC code: MEX
- NPC: Federacion Mexicana de Deporte

in London
- Competitors: 81 in 21 sports
- Medals Ranked 23rd: Gold 6 Silver 4 Bronze 11 Total 21

Summer Paralympics appearances (overview)
- 1972; 1976; 1980; 1984; 1988; 1992; 1996; 2000; 2004; 2008; 2012; 2016; 2020; 2024

Mexico competed at the 2012 Summer Paralympics in London, United Kingdom, from 29 August to 9 September 2012.

== Medallists ==
The following Mexican competitors won medals at the Games.

| Medal | Name | Sport | Event | Date |
|---|---|---|---|---|
| Gold | Amalia Pérez | Powerlifting | Women's 60 kg | 2 September |
| Gold | Gustavo Sánchez Martínez | Swimming | Men's 100 m freestyle S4 | 5 September |
| Gold | Juan Ignacio Reyes | Swimming | Men's 50 m backstroke S4 | 6 September |
| Gold | María de los Ángeles Ortíz | Athletics | Women's shot put F57/58 | 8 September |
| Gold | Luis Alberto Zepeda Félix | Athletics | Men's javelin throw F54/55/56 | 8 September |
| Gold | Gustavo Sánchez Martínez | Swimming | Men's 200 m freestyle S4 | 8 September |
| Silver | Arnulfo Castorena | Swimming | Men's 50 m breaststroke SB2 | 30 August |
| Silver | Salvador Mondragón | Athletics | Men's 100 m T52 | 2 September |
| Silver | Gustavo Sánchez Martínez | Swimming | Men's 150m individual medley | 2 September |
| Silver | Mauro De Jesús | Athletics | Men's shot put F52/53 | 1 September |
| Bronze | Patricia Valle | Swimming | Women's 100 m freestyle S3 | 3 September |
| Bronze | Eduardo Ávila | Judo | Men's 73 kg | 30 August |
| Bronze | Mauro Máximo de Jesús | Athletics | Men's javelin throw F52/53 | 4 September |
| Bronze | Daniela Eugenia Velasco Maldonado | Athletics | Women's 400 m T12 | 4 September |
| Bronze | Perla Bárcenas | Powerlifting | Women's +82.5 kg | 5 September |
| Bronze | Pedro Rangel | Swimming | Men's 100 m breaststroke SB5 | 5 September |
| Bronze | Gustavo Sánchez Martínez | Swimming | Men's 50 m backstroke S4 | 6 September |
| Bronze | Jorge Benjamin González Sauceda | Athletics | Men's 400 m T12 | 6 September |
| Bronze | Patricia Valle | Swimming | Women's 50 m freestyle S3 | 7 September |
| Bronze | Leonardo De Jesús Pérez Juárez | Athletics | Men's 800 m T52 | 7 September |
| Bronze | Salvador Hernández Mondragón | Athletics | Men's 800 m T52 | 8 September |

== Archery ==
Mexico qualified one athlete in Archery.

Men

| Athlete | Event | Ranking round | | Round of 32 | Round of 16 | Quarterfinals | Semifinals | Finals | |
| Athlete | Event | Score | Seed | Opposition score | Opposition score | Opposition score | Opposition score | Opposition score | Rank |
|---|---|---|---|---|---|---|---|---|---|
| Jose Baez | Individual recurve W1/W2 | 555 | 21 | Szarszewski (GER) (12) L 0–6 | Did not advance | | | | |

== Athletics ==
Key

- Note – Ranks given for track events are within the athlete's heat only
- Q = Qualified for the next round
- q = Qualified for the next round as a fastest loser
- WR = World record
- PR = Paralympic record
- RR = Regional record
- NR = National record
- N/A = Round not applicable for the event
- Bye = Athlete not required to compete in round

Men–track

| Athlete | Events | Heat | | Semifinal | | Final | |
| Athlete | Events | Time | Rank | Time | Rank | Time | Rank |
|---|---|---|---|---|---|---|---|
| Juan Carlos Arcos | 1500 m T13 | 4:04.34 | 9 | —N/a | | Did not advance | |
| Juan Carlos Arcos | 800 m T13 | 1:55,82 | 4 q | —N/a | | 1:58.11 | 7 |
| Josue Benitez | 400 m T44 | 59.79 | 6 | —N/a | | Did not advance | |
| Benjamin Cardozo | 100 m T37 | 12.63 | 15 | —N/a | | Did not advance | |
| Juan Pablo Cervantes | 100 m T54 | 15.10 | 5 | —N/a | | Did not advance | |
| Juan Pablo Cervantes | 400 m T54 | 52.83 | 7 | —N/a | | Did not advance | |
| Pedro Gandarilla | 100 m T54 | 14.93 | 5 | —N/a | | Did not advance | |
| Pedro Gandarilla | 200 m T54 | 1:40.84 | 5 | —N/a | | Did not advance | |
| Jorge Gonzalez | 100 m T12 | 11.60 | 2 | —N/a | | Did not advance | |
| Jorge Gonzalez | 200 m T12 | 22:96 | 2 | —N/a | | Did not advance | |
| Jorge Gonzalez | 1500 m T13 | 50.83 | 1 Q | 50.43 | 2 q | 50.41 | 3rd place, bronze medalist(s) |
| Aaron Gordian | 5000 m T54 | 11:32.27 | 3 Q | —N/a | | 11:09.54 | 7 |
| Aaron Gordian | Marathon T54 | —N/a | | | | 1:35:32 | 15 |
| Salvador Hernandez | 100 m T52 | 17.34 | 2 Q | —N/a | | 17.64 | 2nd place, silver medalist(s) |
| Salvador Hernandez | 200 m T52 | 32.69 | 3 Q | —N/a | | 31.81 | 3rd place, bronze medalist(s) |
| Salvador Hernandez | 400 m T52 | DQ | | —N/a | | Did not advance | |
| Pedro Marquez Jr. | 100 m T35 | 15.14 | 6 | —N/a | | Did not advance | |
| Pedro Marquez Jr. | 200 m T35 | 31.51 | 5 | —N/a | | Did not advance | |
| Saúl Mendoza | Marathon T54 | —N/a | | | | 1:44:16 | 23 |
| Pedro Meza | Marathon T46 | —N/a | | | | 2:41:59 | 6 |
| Edgar Navarro | 100 m T51 | —N/a | | | | 23.35 | 4 |
| Leonardo de Jesus Perez | 200 m T52 | 32.78 | 3 Q | —N/a | | 33.16 | 5 |
| Leonardo de Jesus Perez | 400 m T52 | DQ | | —N/a | | Did not advance | |
| Leonardo de Jesus Perez | 800 m T52 | —N/a | | | | 2:01.18 | 3rd place, bronze medalist(s) |
| Jaime Ramirez | 200 m T53 | 28.74 | 8 | —N/a | | Did not advance | |
| Jaime Ramirez | 400 m T53 | DQ | | —N/a | | Did not advance | |
| Jaime Ramirez | 800 m T53 | 1:50.37 | 7 | —N/a | | Did not advance | |
| Fernando Sanchez | 400 m T54 | DQ | | —N/a | | Did not advance | |
| Fernando Sanchez | 800 m T54 | 1:38.82 | 5 | —N/a | | Did not advance | |
| Fernando Sanchez | 1500 m T54 | 3:17.16 | 7 | —N/a | | Did not advance | |
| Mario Santillan | Marathon T46 | —N/a | | | | 2:48:55 | 9 |
| Martin Velasco | 800 m T54 | 1:43.88 | 8 | —N/a | | Did not advance | |
| Martin Velasco | 5000 m T54 | 10:58.97 | 7 | —N/a | | Did not advance | |
| Luis Zapien | 800 m T11 | 4:24.52 | 5 | —N/a | | Did not advance | |
| Luis Zapien | Marathon T11 | —N/a | | | | 16:27.46 | 8 |
| Norberto Zertuche | 100 m T36 | 13.72 | 6 | —N/a | | Did not advance | |
| Fernando Sanchez; Pedro Gandarilla; Juan Pablo Cervantes; Jaime Ramirez | 4 × 400 metres relay T53/T54 | 3:23.04 | 8 | —N/a | | Did not advance | |

Men–field

| Athlete | Events | Result | Rank |
|---|---|---|---|
| Benjamin Cardozo | Long jump F37/F38 | 5.71 m | 7 |
| Fernando Del Rosario | Javelin throw F57/F58 | 42.97 m | 9 |
| Fernando Del Rosario | Discus throw F57/F58 | 49.38 m | 8 |
| Mauro Maximo De Jesus | Shot put F52/F53 | 8.68 m | 2nd place, silver medalist(s) |
| Mauro Maximo De Jesus | Javelin throw F52/F53 | 20.14 m | 3rd place, bronze medalist(s) |
| Luis Zepeda | Javelin throw F54/F55/F56 | 28.07 m RR | 1st place, gold medalist(s) |
| Norberto Zertuche | Discus throw F35/F36 | 29.95 m | 11 |

Women–track

| Athlete | Events | Heat | | Semifinal | | Final | |
| Athlete | Events | Time | Rank | Time | Rank | Time | Rank |
|---|---|---|---|---|---|---|---|
| Yazmith Bataz | 100 m T54 | 18.40 | 4 q | —N/a | | 17.93 | 7 |
| Yazmith Bataz | 400 m T54 | 1:04.81 | 7 | —N/a | | Did not advance | |
| Yazmith Bataz | 200 m T54 | 2:06.97 | 5 | —N/a | | Did not advance | |
| Casandra Cruz | 200 m T11 | 27.11 | 2 q | 26.96 | 3 | Did not advance | |
| Casandra Cruz | 400 m T12 | 1:05.10 | 3 | —N/a | | Did not advance | |
| Grabriela Gonzalez | 100 m T11 | 14.53 | 4 | —N/a | | Did not advance | |
| Tania Jimenez | 100 m T11 | 13.38 | 2 | —N/a | | Did not advance | |
| Fatima Perez | 100 m T35 | —N/a | | | | 17.51 | 7 |
| Fatima Perez | 200 m T35 | —N/a | | | | 37.60 | 8 |
| Ana Isabel Talavera | 100 m T12 | —N/a | | | | DQ | |
| Daniela Velasco; Jose Fuentes (guide) | 200 m T12 | 26.97 | 4 | —N/a | | Did not advance | |
| Daniela Velasco; Jose Fuentes (guide) | 400 m T12 | 58.33 | 2 q | 58.86 | 2 q | 58.51 | 3rd place, bronze medalist(s) |

Women–field

| Athlete | Events | Result | Rank |
|---|---|---|---|
| Gabriela Gonzalez | Long jump F11/F12 | 4.38 m | 4 |
| Yeni Hernandez | Javelin throw F57/F58 | 17.96 m 719 pts | 12 |
| Tania Jimenez | Shot put F11/F12 | 9.24 m 981 pts | 4 |
| Leslie Mendoza | Shot put F20 | 9.32 m | 10 |
| Angeles Ortiz | Shot put F57/F58 | 11.43 m WR; 1015 pts | 1st place, gold medalist(s) |
| Rita Osorio | Shot put F11/F12 | 7.80 m 921 pts | 10 |
| Rita Osorio | Discus throw F11/F12 | 19.60 m 404 pts | 11 |
| Esther Rivera | Javelin throw F33/F34/F53/F54 | 11.07 | 9 |
| Catalina Rosales | Shot put F57/F58 | 9.32 m 857 pts | 8 |
| Catalina Rosales | Discus throw F57/F58 | 27.52 m 621 pts | 12 |
| Estela Salas | Javelin throw F33/F34/F53/F54 | 11.40 | 7 |
| Estela Salas | Discus throw F51-F53 | 12.33 m 591 pts | 6 |
| Rebeca Valezuela | Shot put F11/F12 | 9.95 m 772 pts | 14 |
| Rebeca Valezuela | Javelin throw F11/F12 | 34.17 m RR | 4 |
| Jeny Velazco | Javelin throw F57/F58 | 22.37; 728 pts | 11 |

== Boccia ==
Individual

| Athlete | Event | Seeding matches | Round of 32 | Round of 16 | Quarterfinals | Semifinals | Final / BM | |
| Athlete | Event | Opposition Score | Opposition Score | Opposition Score | Opposition Score | Opposition Score | Opposition Score | Rank |
|---|---|---|---|---|---|---|---|---|
| Eduardo Ventura | Mixed individual BC1 | Nagy (SVK); W 6–1 | Leung (HKG); L 2–6 | Did not advance | | | | |

== Equestrian ==
The only equestrian events held in the Paralympic Games are in the Dressage discipline. Mexico sent a team of three riders to the Games.

Individual

| Athlete | Horse | Event | Total | |
| Athlete | Horse | Event | Score | Rank |
|---|---|---|---|---|
| Erika Baitenmann | Casablanca | Individual championship test grade II | 68.095 | 12 |
| Erika Baitenmann | Casablanca | Individual freestyle test grade II | 65.900 | 12 |
| Fernando Figueroa | Uwannabemine | Individual championship test grade II | 58.810 | 21 |
| Fernando Figueroa | Uwannabemine | Individual freestyle test grade II | 60.100 | 19 |
| Maria Fernanda Otheguy | Welton Adonis | Individual championship test grade II | 61.667 | 20 |
| Maria Fernanda Otheguy | Welton Adonis | Individual freestyle test grade II | 63.500 | 15 |

Team

| Athlete | Horse | Event | Individual score | | | Total | |
| Athlete | Horse | Event | TT | CT | Total | Score | Rank |
|---|---|---|---|---|---|---|---|
| Erika Baitenmann | See above | Team | 66.000 | 68.095 | 134.059 | 369.858 | 15 |
| Fernando Figueroa | See above | Team | 54.905 | 58.810 | 113.715 | 369.858 | 15 |
| Maria Fernanda Otheguy | See above | Team | 60.318 | 61.667 | 121.985 | 369.858 | 15 |

== Judo ==
Three Mexican judokas qualified for the Games.

Men

| Athlete | Event | Preliminaries | Quarterfinals | Semifinals | Repechage First round | Repechage Final | Final / BM | |
| Athlete | Event | Opposition Result | Opposition Result | Opposition Result | Opposition Result | Opposition Result | Opposition Result | Rank |
|---|---|---|---|---|---|---|---|---|
| Eduardo Ávila | Men's 73 kg | Bye | Takahashi (JPN); W 0001–0021 | Solovey (UKR); L 1023–0102 | Bye | | Briceno (VEN); W 0013–0101 | 3rd place, bronze medalist(s) |
| Alejandro Gonzalez | Men's 90 kg | Kretsul (RUS); L 000–100 | Did not advance | | Asakereh (IRI); L 000–100 | Did not advance | | |

Women

| Athlete | Event | Preliminaries | Quarterfinals | Semifinals | Repechage First round | Repechage Final | Final / BM | |
| Athlete | Event | Opposition Result | Opposition Result | Opposition Result | Opposition Result | Opposition Result | Opposition Result | Rank |
|---|---|---|---|---|---|---|---|---|
| Lenia Ruvalcaba | Women's 70 kg | Bye | Herrera Gomez (ESP); L 0002–004 | Did not advance | Bye | Garcia (USA); W 112–0002 | Szabo (HUN); L 000–020 | 5 |

== Powerlifting ==
| Athlete | Event | Total lifted | Rank |
|---|---|---|---|
| Porfirio Francisco Arredondo Luna | Men's 82.5 kg | 195 kg | 5 |
| Perla Barcenas | Women's 82.5 kg | 135 kg | 3rd place, bronze medalist(s) |
| Jose de Jesus Castillo | Men's 90 kg | NM | |
| Laura Cerero | Women's 44 kg | NM | |
| Catalina Diaz | Men's 82.5 kg | 128 kg | 4 |
| Amalia Perez | Women's 60 kg | 135 kg | 1st place, gold medalist(s) |

== Swimming ==
Men

| Athlete | Events | Heats | | Final | |
| Athlete | Events | Time | Rank | Time | Rank |
|---|---|---|---|---|---|
| Luis Armando Andrade Guillen | 100 m freestyle S8 | 1:04.39 | 6 | Did not advance | |
| Luis Armando Andrade Guillen | 200 m individual medley SM8 | 2:36.73 | 5 | Did not advance | |
| Luis Armando Andrade Guillen | 100 m breaststroke SB8 | 1:22.35 | 7 | Did not advance | |
| Luis Armando Andrade Guillen | 100 m butterfly S8 | 1:08.06 | 5 | Did not advance | |
| Arnulfo Castorena | 50 m freestyle S4 | 1:03.27 | 8 | Did not advance | |
| Arnulfo Castorena | 100 m breaststroke SB2 | 59.01 | 1 Q | 58.23 | 2nd place, silver medalist(s) |
| Arnulfo Castorena | 150 m individual medley SM3 | DNS | | Did not advance | |
| Enrique Perez Davila | 50 m freestyle S7 | 32.41 | 6 | Did not advance | |
| Enrique Perez Davila | 100 m freestyle S7 | 1:09.65 | 6 | Did not advance | |
| Enrique Perez Davila | 50 m butterfly S7 | 39.21 | 6 | Did not advance | |
| Enrique Perez Davila | 100 m backstroke S7 | 1:25.87 | 8 | Did not advance | |
| Enrique Perez Davila | 400 m freestyle S7 | 5:25.31 | 8 | Did not advance | |
| Pedro Rangel | 100 m breaststroke SB5 | 1:37.97 | 2 Q | 1:36.85 | 3rd place, bronze medalist(s) |
| Juan Ignacio Reyes | 50 m backstroke S4 | 47.40 | 2 Q | 45.75 | 1st place, gold medalist(s) |
| Gustavo Sánchez Martínez | 50 m freestyle S4 | 39.48 | 1 Q | 39.97 | 5 |
| Gustavo Sánchez Martínez | 100 m freestyle S4 | 1:24.79 | 1 Q | 1:24.28 | 1st place, gold medalist(s) |
| Gustavo Sánchez Martínez | 200 m freestyle S4 | 3:02.79 | 1Q | 2:58.09 | 1st place, gold medalist(s) |
| Gustavo Sánchez Martínez | 50 m backstroke S4 | 46.48 | 2 Q | 47.17 | 3rd place, bronze medalist(s) |
| Gustavo Sánchez Martínez | 100 m breaststroke SB8 | 53.26 | 4 Q | 52.67 | 5 |
| Gustavo Sánchez Martínez | 150 m individual medley SM4 | 2:37.48 | 2 Q | 2:39.55 | 2nd place, silver medalist(s) |
| Alejandro Silva | 100 m breaststroke SB5 | 1:50.13 | 4 | Did not advance | |
| Cristopher Tronco | 50 m backstroke S3 | 1:04.32 | 6 | Did not advance | |
| Cristopher Tronco | 150 m individual medley SM3 | DNS | | Did not advance | |
| Cristopher Tronco | 50 m breaststroke SB2 | 1:00.12 | 3 Q | 1:01.12 | 4 |

Women

| Athlete | Events | Heats | | Final | |
| Athlete | Events | Time | Rank | Time | Rank |
|---|---|---|---|---|---|
| Haideé Aceves | 50 m freestyle S3 | —N/a | | 1:09.99 | 6 |
| Haideé Aceves | 100 m freestyle S3 | 2:28.16 | 4 Q | 2:28.96 | 7 |
| Matilde Alcázar | 100 m backstroke S12 | 1:35.43 | 12 | Did not advance | |
| Matilde Alcázar | 100 m backstroke S12 | 1:34.39 | 6 | Did not advance | |
| Matilde Alcázar | 200 m individual medley SM12 | 3:07.19 | 7 | Did not advance | |
| Matilde Alcázar | 400 m freestyle S12 | 5:49.15 | 6 | Did not advance | |
| Jessica Aviles | 400 m freestyle S7 | 6:05.13 | 6 | Did not advance | |
| Jessica Aviles | 50 m freestyle S7 | 39.45 | 8 | Did not advance | |
| Jessica Aviles | 100 m freestyle S7 | 1:23.87 | 7 | Did not advance | |
| Jessica Aviles | 100 m backstroke S7 | 1:37.28 | 6 | Did not advance | |
| Jessica Aviles | 200 m individual medley SM7 | 3:51.37 | 6 | Did not advance | |
| Mariana Díaz de la Vega | 100 m breaststroke SB14 | 1:26.72 | 4 | Did not advance | |
| Mariana Díaz de la Vega | 100 m freestyle S14 | 2:33.09 | 6 | Did not advance | |
| Mariana Díaz de la Vega | 100 m backstroke S14 | 1:24.26 | 6 | Did not advance | |
| Karina Domingo | 100 m freestyle S6 | 1:32.19 | 17 | Did not advance | |
| Karina Domingo | 50 m butterfly S6 | 48.54 | 8 | Did not advance | |
| Karina Domingo | 200 m individual medley SM6 | 3:34.52 | 4 | Did not advance | |
| Karina Domingo | 400 m freestyle S6 | 6:23.41 | 5 | Did not advance | |
| Karina Domingo | 100 m breaststroke SB6 | 1:56.58 | 4 Q | 1:56.17 | 8 |
| Karina Domingo | 50 m freestyle S6 | 42.46 | 7 | Did not advance | |
| Karina Domingo | 100 m backstroke S6 | 1:49.65 | 8 | Did not advance | |
| Doramitzi Gonzalez | 50 m freestyle S6 | DSQ | | Did not advance | |
| Doramitzi Gonzalez | 100 m freestyle S6 | 1:24.32 | 11 | Did not advance | |
| Doramitzi Gonzalez | 400 m freestyle S6 | 6:14.32 | 4 Q | 6:29.51 | 8 |
| Doramitzi Gonzalez | 50 m butterfly S6 | 44.41 | 6 | Did not advance | |
| Doramitzi Gonzalez | 100 m backstroke S6 | 1:39.32 | 6 | Did not advance | |
| Vianney Trejo | 50 m freestyle S6 | 39.60 | 4 | Did not advance | |
| Vianney Trejo | 100 m backstroke S6 | 1:36.64 | 4 | Did not advance | |
| Vianney Trejo | 200 m individual medley SM6 | 3:32.78 | 5 Q | 3:28.97 | 8 |
| Vianney Trejo | 50 m butterfly S6 | 44.54 | 6 | Did not advance | |
| Vianney Trejo | 400 m freestyle S6 | 5:47.07 | 4 Q | 5:47.85 | 6 |
| Vianney Trejo | 100 m freestyle S6 | 1:23.71 | 9 Q | Did not advance | |
| Patricia Valle | 50 m freestyle S3 | —N/a | | 55.72 | 3rd place, bronze medalist(s) |
| Patricia Valle | 100 m freestyle S3 | 2:07.22 | 2 Q | 1:59.76 | 3rd place, bronze medalist(s) |
| Patricia Valle | 200 m freestyle S5 | 4:19.57 | 5 | Did not advance | |

== Table tennis ==
Women

| Athlete | Event | Preliminaries | | | Quarterfinals | Semifinals | Final / BM | |
| Athlete | Event | Opposition Result | Opposition Result | Rank | Opposition Result | Opposition Result | Opposition Result | Rank |
|---|---|---|---|---|---|---|---|---|
| Edith Sigala | Singles class 3 | Campbell (GBR); L 2–3 | Altintas (TUR); L 2–3 | 3 | Did not advance | | | |

== Wheelchair basketball ==
=== Women's tournament ===
| Squad list | Group stage | | Quarter-final | Semi-final | Final | |
| Squad list | Opposition Result | Rank | Opposition Result | Opposition Result | Opposition Result | Rank |
|---|---|---|---|---|---|---|
| From: Floralia Estrada Bernal; Wendy Garcia Amador; Maria Hernandez Medrano; Isabel Lopez Chavez; Clara Marquez Gonzalez; Claudia Miranda Orantes; Maria del Carmen Montano Mejia; Anaisa Perez Pacheco; Yasmina Suarez Ramos; Rocio Torres Lopez; Lucia Vazquez Delgadillo; Rosa Vera Gallardo | China; L 46–53 | 4 Q | Australia; L 37–62 | 5th–8th place semi-final Canada; L 53–74 | 7th/8th place match Great Britain; L 37–59 | 8 |
| From: Floralia Estrada Bernal; Wendy Garcia Amador; Maria Hernandez Medrano; Isabel Lopez Chavez; Clara Marquez Gonzalez; Claudia Miranda Orantes; Maria del Carmen Montano Mejia; Anaisa Perez Pacheco; Yasmina Suarez Ramos; Rocio Torres Lopez; Lucia Vazquez Delgadillo; Rosa Vera Gallardo | United States; L 33–67 | 4 Q | Australia; L 37–62 | 5th–8th place semi-final Canada; L 53–74 | 7th/8th place match Great Britain; L 37–59 | 8 |
| From: Floralia Estrada Bernal; Wendy Garcia Amador; Maria Hernandez Medrano; Isabel Lopez Chavez; Clara Marquez Gonzalez; Claudia Miranda Orantes; Maria del Carmen Montano Mejia; Anaisa Perez Pacheco; Yasmina Suarez Ramos; Rocio Torres Lopez; Lucia Vazquez Delgadillo; Rosa Vera Gallardo | France; W 50–42 | 4 Q | Australia; L 37–62 | 5th–8th place semi-final Canada; L 53–74 | 7th/8th place match Great Britain; L 37–59 | 8 |
| From: Floralia Estrada Bernal; Wendy Garcia Amador; Maria Hernandez Medrano; Isabel Lopez Chavez; Clara Marquez Gonzalez; Claudia Miranda Orantes; Maria del Carmen Montano Mejia; Anaisa Perez Pacheco; Yasmina Suarez Ramos; Rocio Torres Lopez; Lucia Vazquez Delgadillo; Rosa Vera Gallardo | Germany; L 28–68 | 4 Q | Australia; L 37–62 | 5th–8th place semi-final Canada; L 53–74 | 7th/8th place match Great Britain; L 37–59 | 8 |

Group play

| Team | Pld | W | L | PF | PA | PD | Pts | Qualification |
|---|---|---|---|---|---|---|---|---|
| Germany | 4 | 4 | 0 | 254 | 158 | +96 | 8 | Quarter-finals |
| United States | 4 | 3 | 1 | 246 | 176 | +70 | 7 | Quarter-finals |
| China | 4 | 2 | 2 | 240 | 204 | +36 | 6 | Quarter-finals |
| Mexico | 4 | 1 | 3 | 157 | 230 | −73 | 5 | Quarter-finals |
| France | 4 | 0 | 4 | 132 | 261 | −129 | 4 | Eliminated |

30 August 2012
21:15

Report

| Mexico | 46–53 | China |
Scoring by quarter: 21–11, 9–11, 11–13, 5–18
| Pts: Estrada Bernal 18; Rebs: Estrada Bernal 14; Asts: Estrada Bernal 4 | | Pts: Cheng 19; Rebs: Cheng 13; Asts: Zhang 3 |

North Greenwich Arena, London
Referees: Ian Pursglove (GBR)

1 September 2012
10:45

Report

| United States | 67–33 | Mexico |
Scoring by quarter: 22–9, 10–9, 14–6, 21–9
| Pts: Murray 22; Rebs: Murray 7 Asts: Murray 6 | | Pts: Estrada Bernal 10; Rebs: Estrada Bernal 10; Asts: Estrada Bernal 4 |

North Greenwich Arena, London
Referees: Eisuke Kanno (JPN)

2 September 2012
13:00

Report

| Mexico | 50–42 | France |
Scoring by quarter: 13–12, 13–8, 11–6, 13–16
| Pts: Vázquez Delgadillo 18; Rebs: Estrada Bernal 13; Asts: Pérez Pacheco 8 | | Pts: Quemener-Pichon 22; Rebs: Saint-Omer-Delépine 8 Asts: Glemp-Etavard 7 |

North Greenwich Arena, London
Referees: Philip Haines (AUS)

3 September 2012
10:45

Report

| Mexico | 28–68 | Germany |
Scoring by quarter: 5–10, 14–24, 5–19, 4–15
| Pts: Estrada Bernal 12; Rebs: Pérez Pacheco 3 Asts: Estrada Bernal 10 | | Pts: Adermann 18; Rebs: Adermann 10; Asts: Müller 6 |

Basketball Arena, London
Referees: Shu Fei Hsieh (TPE)

Quarter-final

4 September 2012
13:00

Report

| Australia | 62–37 | Mexico |
Scoring by quarter: 21–10, 23–10, 6–9, 12–8
| Pts: Merritt 14; Rebs: Kean 5 Asts: Gauci 7 | | Pts: Estrada Bernal 11; Rebs: Estrada Bernal 4 Asts: Estrada Bernal 16 |

North Greenwich Arena, London
Referees: Valerie Farrugia (FRA)

5th–8th place semi-final

6 September 2012
8:30

Report

| Canada | 74–53 | Mexico |
Scoring by quarter: 30–4, 12–20, 18–12, 14–17
| Pts: McLachlan 24; Rebs: McLachlan 13; Asts: Ouellet 10 | | Pts: Estrada Bernal 15; Rebs: Estrada Bernal 12; Asts: Vázquez Delgadillo 6 |

North Greenwich Arena, London
Referees: Philip Haines (AUS)

7th/8th place match

7 September 2012
8:30

Report

| Mexico | 37–59 | Great Britain |
Scoring by quarter: 11–6, 8–12, 7–22, 11–19
| Pts: Estrada Bernal, Pérez Pacheco 9 Rebs: Pérez Pacheco 4 Asts: Estrada Bernal 6 | | Pts: Conroy 22; Rebs: Freeman 9 Asts: Freeman 9 |

North Greenwich Arena, London
Referees: Matt Wells (AUS)
