= Yuji Hanada =

Japanese Paralympic swimmer

Medal record

Men's swimming

Representing Japan

Paralympic Games
Silver medal – second place	2004 Athens	50 metre freestyle - S4
Silver medal – second place	2004 Athens	100 metre freestyle - S4
Silver medal – second place	2004 Athens	4x50 metre medley relay - 20pts
Bronze medal – third place	2004 Athens	200 metre freestyle - S4

Yuji Hanada (花田 裕治, Hanada Yūji) is a Paralympic swimmer from Japan. He competed mainly in S4 freestyle events.

Yuji competed as part of the Japanese Paralympic swimming team at the 2004 Summer Paralympics where he was part of the 4x50m freestyle squad that finished fourth and also the squad that finished second in the 4x50m medley behind the games record set by Brazil. He picked up a further two silver medals in the 50m and 100m freestyle on both occasions behind Brazilian Clodoaldo Silva he also finished third in the 200m freestyle that was again won by Silva. Silva has since been reclassified to S5, a class for more able-bodied swimmers.

As of January 2013, Hanada is recognised by the International Paralympic Committee as S4 world record holder in the 50 metre freestyle event, a record time he set at the Athens Paralympics in 2004.
