= Jin Zhipeng =

Chinese Paralympic swimmer

Personal information
- Nationality: Chinese

Sport
- Sport: Swimming
Medal record
Representing China
Men's Paralympic swimming
Summer Paralympics
Gold medal – first place	2016 Rio de Janeiro	Men's 50 metre breaststroke SB3
Silver medal – second place	2016 Rio de Janeiro	Men's 100 metre freestyle S4
Silver medal – second place	2016 Rio de Janeiro	Men's 150 metre individual medley SM4
Bronze medal – third place	2016 Rio de Janeiro	Men's 200 metre freestyle S4

Jin Zhipeng is a Chinese swimmer. He won a gold medal at the Men's 50 metre breaststroke SB3 event at the 2016 Summer Paralympics with a world record and paralympic record of 47.54. He also won a silver medal at the Men's 100 metre freestyle S4 event with 1:26.05, another silver medal at the Men's 150 metre individual medley SM4 event with 2:26.91 and a bronze medal at the Men's 200 metre freestyle S4 event with 3:03.94.
