= Liu Yuntao =

Chinese Paralympic swimmer

Personal information
- Nationality: Chinese
- Born: November 9, 1995 (age 30)

Sport
- Sport: Swimming
Medal record
Men's paralympic swimming
Representing China
Summer Paralympics
Silver medal – second place	2016 Rio de Janeiro	Men's 50 metre backstroke S4

Liu Yuntao (born November 9, 1995) is a Chinese swimmer. He won a silver medal at the Men's 50 metre backstroke S4 event at the 2016 Summer Paralympics with 45.01.
