= Ronystony Cordeiro =

Brazilian paralympic swimmer

Personal information
- Full name: Ronystony Cordeiro da Silva
- Born: 19 June 1980 (age 46) João Pessoa, Paraíba, Brazil

Sport
- Country: Brazil
- Sport: Swimming
Medal record
Swimming
Representing Brazil
Parapan American Games
Bronze medal – third place	2011 Guadalajara	Men's 50 metre freestyle S4
Gold medal – first place	2011 Guadalajara	Men's 4x50 metre freestyle relay
Silver medal – second place	2015 Toronto	Men's 50 metre freestyle S4
Silver medal – second place	2015 Toronto	Men's 100 metre freestyle S5
Silver medal – second place	2015 Toronto	Men's 50 metre freestyle S5
Bronze medal – third place	2015 Toronto	Men's 50 metre breaststroke SB3
Silver medal – second place	2015 Toronto	Men's 100 metre breaststroke SB4
Bronze medal – third place	2015 Toronto	Men's 150 metre individual medley SM4
World Championships
Gold medal – first place	2013 Montreal	Men's 4 × 50 metre freestyle relay

Ronystony Cordeiro da Silva (born 19 June 1980) is a Brazilian paralympic swimmer. He competed at the 2011 and 2015 Parapan American Games, winning one gold medal, four silver medals and three bronze medals in the breaststroke, freestyle and medley events. Cordeiro also won a gold medal at the 2013 World Championships in the men's 4 × 50 metre freestyle relay event. He also competed at the 2012, 2016 and 2020 Summer Paralympics.
