= Andrii Derevinskyi =

Ukrainian Paralympic swimmer

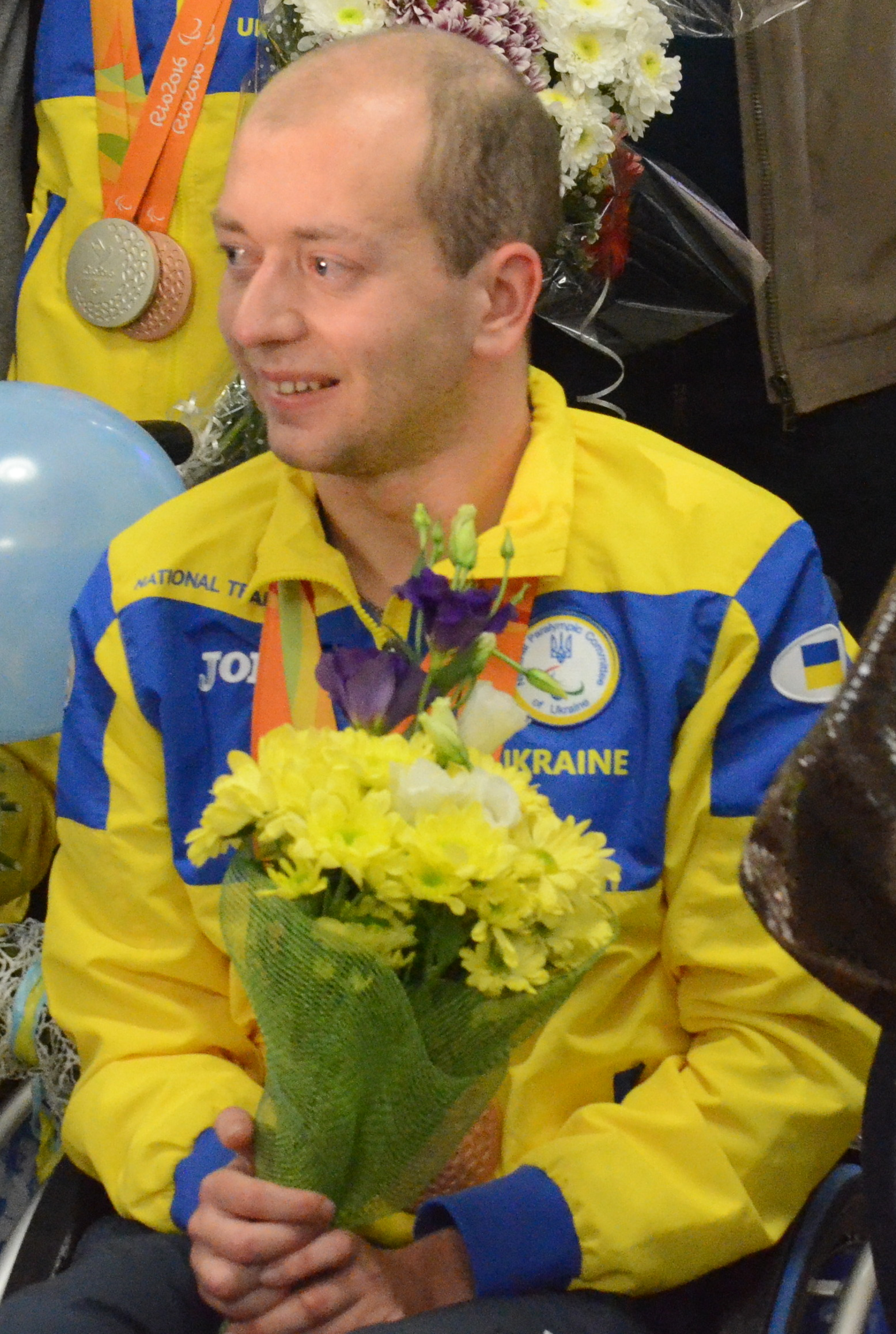
- Derevinskyi in 2016

Personal information
- Born: 28 March 1988 (age 38)

Sport
- Country: Ukraine
- Sport: Paralympic swimming
Medal record
Paralympic Games
Bronze medal – third place	2016 Rio de Janeiro	50 m freestyle S4
Bronze medal – third place	2016 Rio de Janeiro	Mixed 4 x 50 m freestyle relay

Andrii Derevinskyi (Ukrainian: Андрій Юрійович Деревінський; born 28 March 1988) is a Ukrainian Paralympic swimmer. He represented Ukraine at the 2016 Summer Paralympics and he won two bronze medals: in the men's 50 metre freestyle S4 event and in the mixed 4 x 50 metre freestyle relay 20pts event.

He won six medals at the 2014 IPC Swimming European Championships; three individual medals and three medals in team events.

At the 2018 World Para Swimming European Championships he won the gold medal in the 4 x 50 metres medley relay event.
