= Efrem Morelli =

Italian Paralympic swimmer (born 1979)

Personal information
- Born: 25 November 1979 (age 46)

Sport
- Country: Italy
- Sport: Paralympic swimming
- Disability: Paraplegia
- Disability class: S4, SB3, SM4
Medal record
Men's para swimming
Representing Italy
Paralympic Games
Silver medal – second place	2024 Paris	50 m breaststroke SB3
Bronze medal – third place	2016 Rio de Janeiro	50 m breaststroke SB3
World Championships
Gold medal – first place	2019 London	50 m breaststroke SB3
Gold medal – first place	2022 Madeira	50 m breaststroke SB3
Bronze medal – third place	2025 Singapore	50 m breaststroke SB3
European Championships
Gold medal – first place	2016 Funchal	50 m breaststroke SB3
Gold medal – first place	2018 Dublin	50 m breaststroke SB3
Silver medal – second place	2014 Eindhoven	Mixed 4 x 50 m freestyle relay
Silver medal – second place	2018 Dublin	150 m individual medley S4
Silver medal – second place	2018 Dublin	4 x 50 m medley relay
Bronze medal – third place	2014 Eindhoven	100 m breaststroke SB4

Efrem Morelli (born 25 November 1979) is an Italian Paralympic swimmer. He represented Italy at the Summer Paralympics in 2008, 2012, 2016, 2021 and 2024. He won the silver medal in the 50 m breaststroke SB3 event in 2024. He also won the bronze medal in the 50 m breaststroke SB3 event in 2016.

== Career ==
At the 2019 World Para Swimming Championships held in London, United Kingdom, he set a new record in the men's 50 metre breaststroke SB3 event with a time of 47.49s.
