= Gustavo Sánchez Martínez =

Mexican Paralympic swimmer (born 1994)

Gustavo Sánchez
Personal information
- Full name: Gustavo Ramón Sánchez Martínez
- Born: 3 May 1994 (age 32) Mexico City, Mexico
Medal record
Men's para swimming
Representing Mexico
Paralympic Games
Gold medal – first place	2012 London	100 m freestyle S4
Gold medal – first place	2012 London	200 m freestyle S4
Silver medal – second place	2012 London	150 m medley SM4
Bronze medal – third place	2012 London	50 m backstroke S4
IPC World Championships
Gold medal – first place	2013 Montreal	200 m freestyle S4
Silver medal – second place	2013 Montreal	50 m freestyle S4
Bronze medal – third place	2013 Montreal	100 m freestyle S4
Bronze medal – third place	2013 Montreal	50 m backstroke S4
Bronze medal – third place	2013 Montreal	50 m butterfly S4
Bronze medal – third place	2010 Eindhoven	50 m freestyle S4
Bronze medal – third place	2010 Eindhoven	100 m freestyle S4
Bronze medal – third place	2010 Eindhoven	200 m freestyle S4
Parapan American Games
Gold medal – first place	2011 Guadalajara	50m freestyle S4
Gold medal – first place	2011 Guadalajara	50m breaststroke SB3
Gold medal – first place	2015 Toronto	50 m freestyle S4
Gold medal – first place	2015 Toronto	100m freestyle S4
Gold medal – first place	2015 Toronto	50m breaststroke SB3
Gold medal – first place	2019 Lima	50m freestyle S4
Gold medal – first place	2019 Lima	100m freestyle S4
Gold medal – first place	2019 Lima	50m breaststroke SB3
Gold medal – first place	2019 Lima	50m butterfly S4
Silver medal – second place	2015 Toronto	50m backstroke S4
Silver medal – second place	2019 Lima	200m freestyle S5
Silver medal – second place	2019 Lima	50m backstroke S4
Bronze medal – third place	2011 Guadalajara	100m freestyle S5
Bronze medal – third place	2011 Guadalajara	200m freestyle S5

Gustavo Sánchez Martínez (Note: In this Spanish name, the first or paternal surname is Sánchez and the second or maternal family name is Martínez.) (born 3 May 1994) is a Mexican competitive swimmer, born without left hand and both legs, who won four medals for Mexico at the 2012 Summer Paralympics. He competed in five events, 50m freestyle (5th place), 100m freestyle (1st place), 200m freestyle (1st place), 150m medley (2nd place), 50m backstroke (3rd place). Gustavo became well known at World Championships in Eindhoven, Netherlands, 2010, where he won three bronze medals. His biggest rivals in the pools are David Smetanine from France and Richard Oribe from Spain.

At the Rio 2016 Paralympic Games, his five swim finals resulted in no medals.
