= Michael Schoenmaker =

Dutch Paralympic swimmer (born 1983)

Personal information
- Born: 3 February 1983 (age 43) Roosendaal, Netherlands

Sport
- Sport: Swimming
Medal record
Representing Netherlands
Paralympic swimming
Paralympic Games
Gold medal – first place	2012 London	50m breaststroke SB3
Silver medal – second place	2016 Rio de Janeiro	200m freestyle S4
Bronze medal – third place	2016 Rio de Janeiro	100m freestyle S4
World Championships
Bronze medal – third place	2013 Montreal	200m freestyle S4
Bronze medal – third place	2013 Montreal	50m breaststroke SB3

Michael Schoenmaker (born 3 February 1983) is a Dutch Paralympic swimmer. He represented the Netherlands at the 2012 Summer Paralympics and at the 2016 Summer Paralympics.

At the 2012 Summer Paralympics held in London, United Kingdom, he won the gold medal in the men's 50 metre breaststroke SB3 event.

At the 2016 Summer Paralympics held in Rio de Janeiro, Brazil, he won the silver medal in the men's 200 metre freestyle S4 event and the bronze medal in the men's 100 metre freestyle S4 event.
