= Christoffer Lindhe =

Swedish Paralympic swimmer

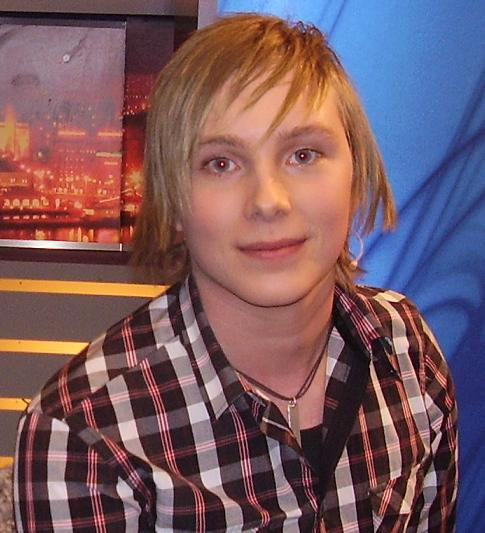
- Lindhe in 2008

Personal information
- Full name: Bernt Erik Christoffer Lindhe
- Born: 1 February 1989 (age 37) Ulricehamn, Sweden

Sport
- Country: Sweden
- Sport: Paralympic swimming
- Disability class: S4
Medal record
Paralympic swimming
Representing Sweden
World Championships (SC)
Bronze medal – third place	2009 Rio de Janeiro	50m freestyle S4
Bronze medal – third place	2009 Rio de Janeiro	100m freestyle S4
Bronze medal – third place	2009 Rio de Janeiro	200m freestyle S4

Bernt Erik Christoffer Lindhe (born 1 February 1989) is a Swedish Paralympic swimmer. He is a triple World bronze medalist and has Swedish records in 50, 100 and 200 m freestyle swimming and 50 m butterfly stroke. He competed in the 2008 and 2012 Summer Paralympics.

Lindhe lost an arm and both of his legs in a train accident in the summer of 2006.
