= Richard Oribe =

Spanish Paralympic swimmer

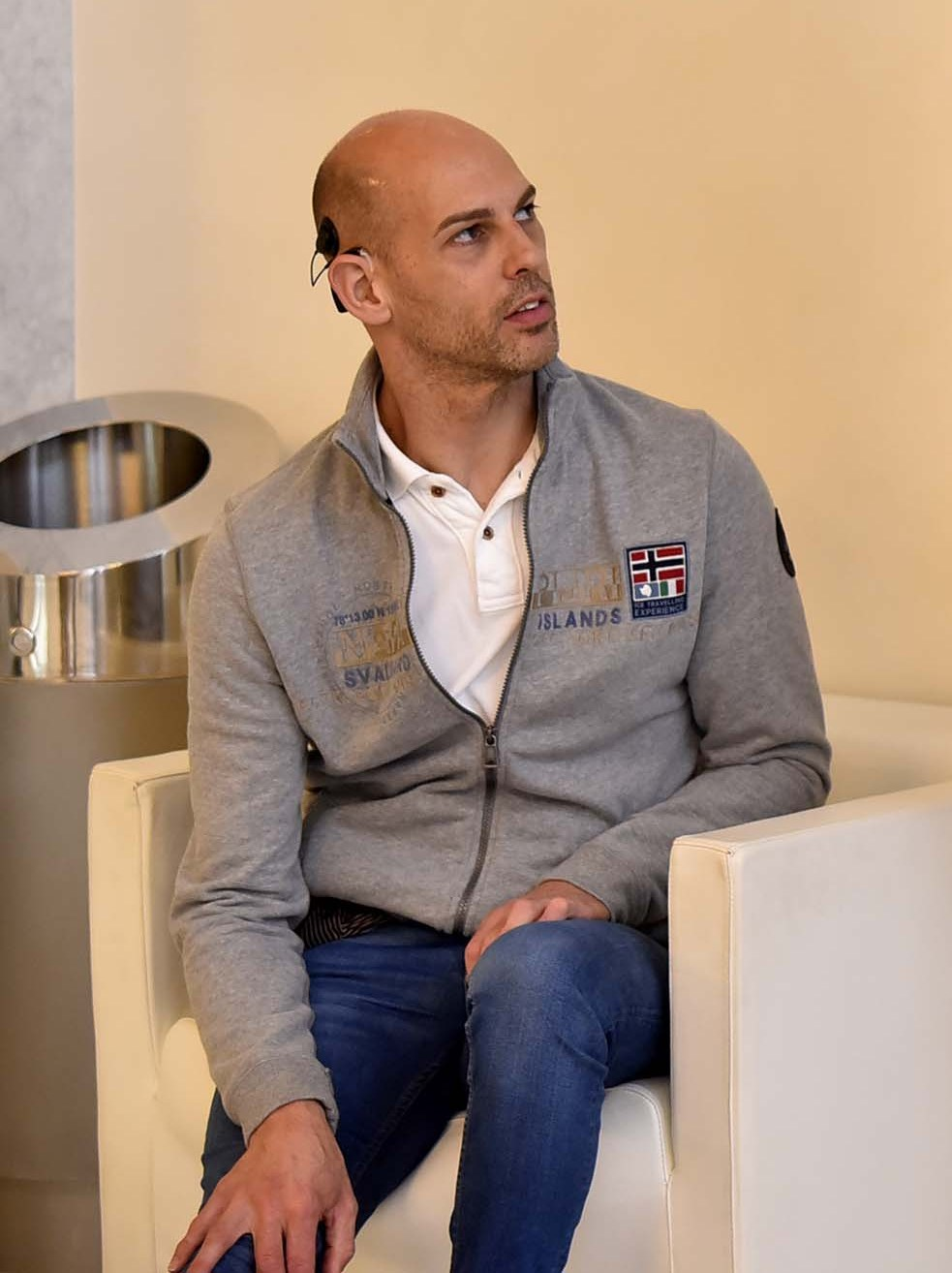
- Oribe in 2016

Personal information
- Nationality: Spanish
- Born: 22 February 1974 (age 52) San Sebastián, Spain

Sport
- Country: Spain
- Sport: Swimming

Richard Oribe Lumbreras (born 22 February 1974) is a Basque Spanish Paralympic swimmer. He started swimming very soon as a treatment for his congenital mental disability. He is one of the most awarded Spanish athletes of all time.

== Personal ==
Oribe was born in San Sebastián. he has cerebral palsy.

== Swimming ==
In 2007, he competed at the IDM German Open.

=== Paralympics ===
He won a silver medal in the 100 metres freestyle — S4 event at the 2008 Paralympics, and at the 2012 Paralympics won a silver medal in the same event and a bronze in the 200 metres freestyle — S4.

=== Achievements ===
Championship	Place	Year	Medals
Paralympic games	London	2012	2
Paralympic games	Beijing	2008	4
World Championship	Durban	2006	4
European Championship	Berlin	2006	3
European Championship	Berlin	2005	4
Paralympic games	Athens	2004	3
World Championship	Mar del Plata	2002	4
European Championship	Stockholm	2001	4
Paralympic games	Sydney	2000	4
European Championship	Germany	1999	5
World Championship	New Zealand	1998	5
European Championship	Badajoz	1997	5
Paralympic Games	Atlanta	1996	4
European Championship	Perpignan	1995	4
Paralympic Games	Barcelona	1992	–
