= Jan Povýšil =

Czech Paralympic swimmer

Personal information
- Nationality: Czech Republic
- Born: 11 April 1982 (age 44) Prague, Czechoslovakia
- Height: 1.90 m (6 ft 3 in)
- Weight: 80 kg (176 lb)

Sport
- Sport: Swimming
- Strokes: freestyle
Medal record
Men's swimming
Representing Czech Republic
Paralympic Games
Bronze medal – third place	2000 Sydney	50 m freestyle S4
Bronze medal – third place	2008 Beijing	50 m freestyle S4
Bronze medal – third place	2008 Beijing	100 m freestyle S4
Bronze medal – third place	2008 Beijing	200 m freestyle S4
Bronze medal – third place	2012 London	100 m freestyle S4
World Championships
Gold medal – first place	2017 Mexico City	50m freestyle S4
Silver medal – second place	2002 Mar del Plata	4x50m freestyle relay 20pts
Silver medal – second place	2010 Eindhoven	150m individual medley SM4
Bronze medal – third place	2002 Mar del Plata	50m freestyle S4
Bronze medal – third place	2006 Durban	50m backstroke S4
Bronze medal – third place	2006 Durban	100m freestyle S4
Bronze medal – third place	2017 Mexico City	150m individual medley SM4
European Championships
Bronze medal – third place	2016 Madeira	50m backstroke S4
Bronze medal – third place	2016 Madeira	150m individual medley SM4

Jan Povýšil (born 11 April 1982) is a Czech former Paralympic swimmer. He has competed in five Paralympic games from 2000 through 2016. He competes in the S4 class and has won five bronze medals in freestyle events.

Povýšil was paralysed following an accident at a water park in Italy in 1997.
