= David Smétanine =

French Paralympic swimmer

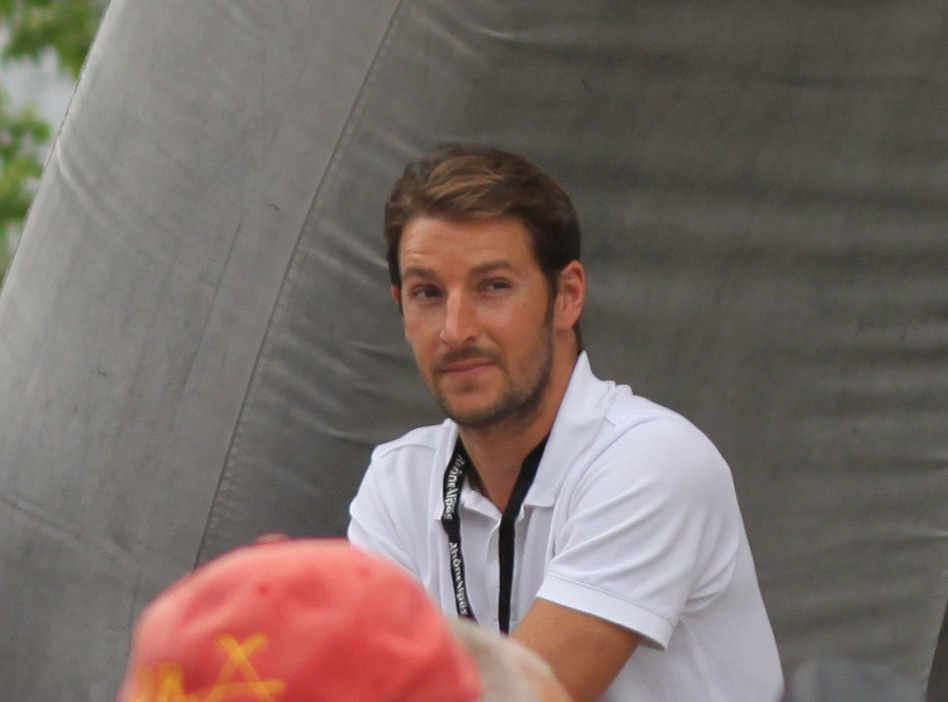
- Smétanine in 2010

Personal information
- Born: 21 October 1974 (age 51) Grenoble, France
Medal record
Men's para swimming
Representing France
Paralympic Games
Gold medal – first place	2008 Beijing	100 m freestyle S4
Gold medal – first place	2008 Beijing	50 m freestyle S4
Silver medal – second place	2008 Beijing	200 m freestyle S4
Silver medal – second place	2008 Beijing	50 m backstroke S4
Silver medal – second place	2012 London	50 m freestyle S4
Silver medal – second place	2012 London	200 m freestyle S4
Silver medal – second place	2016 Rio	50 m freestyle S4
Bronze medal – third place	2004 Athens	50 m freestlye S4
Bronze medal – third place	2012 London	100 m freestlye S4
World Championships
Gold medal – first place	2010 Eindhoven	50 m freestyle S4
Gold medal – first place	2010 Eindhoven	100 m freestyle S4
Gold medal – first place	2010 Eindhoven	200 m freestyle S4
Silver medal – second place	2006 Durban	100 m freestyle S4
Silver medal – second place	2006 Durban	200 m freestyle S4
Bronze medal – third place	2010 Eindhoven	50 m backstroke S4
Bronze medal – third place	2010 Eindhoven	4x50 m freestyle 20pts
Bronze medal – third place	2013 Montreal	50 m freestyle S4
Bronze medal – third place	2015 Glasgow	50 m freestyle S4
Bronze medal – third place	2015 Glasgow	100 m freestyle S4
European Championships
Gold medal – first place	2009 Reykjavik	50 m freestyle S4
Gold medal – first place	2009 Reykjavik	100 m freestyle S4
Gold medal – first place	2009 Reykjavik	50 m backstroke S4
Silver medal – second place	2009 Reykjavik	200 m freestyle S2
Silver medal – second place	2014 Eindhoven	100 m freestyle S4
Silver medal – second place	2016 Funchal	50 m freestyle S4
Silver medal – second place	2016 Funchal	200 m freestyle S4

David Smétanine (born 21 October 1974) is a French Paralympic swimmer.

== Personal history ==
Smétanine was born in Grenoble, France in 1974. He has paraplegia caused by spinal damage after he was involved in a car accident at the age of 21.

In 2008 he was made a Chevalier of the Légion d'honneur, for his services to his sport and his country after his performance at the 2008 Beijing Paralympic Games.

In 2010 he was elected to the Regional Council of the Rhône-Alpes, representing the Socialist Party.

== Swimming career ==
Smétanine first represented France at the 2004 Summer Paralympics in Athens, winning a bronze medal in the 50 metre freestyle event in his category. At the 2008 Summer Paralympics, he won gold in the 100 metre freestyle event and gold in the 50m freestyle, as well as two silver, in the 50m backstroke and 200m freestyle. At the 2012 Games, he won two silver and a bronze.

As of 2008, he was the European record holder in the 50m, 100m and 200m freestyle events, as well as the 50m backstroke.
