= Shooting at the 2004 Summer Paralympics – Mixed 50 metre pistol SH1 =

Pistol shooting competition

Mixed 50m Free Pistol SH1 at the XII Paralympic Games
- Paralympic Shooting
- Venue: Markopoulo Olympic Shooting Centre
- Dates: 23 September 2004
- Competitors: 27 from 17 nations
- Winning points: 621.7

Medalists
1st place, gold medalist(s)		Andrey Lebedinsky	Russia
2nd place, silver medalist(s)		Roland Hartmann	Germany
3rd place, bronze medalist(s)		Muharrem Korhan Yamac	Turkey

The Mixed 50m Free Pistol SH1 shooting event at the 2004 Summer Paralympics was competed on 23 September. It was won by Andrey Lebedinsky, representing Russia.

== Preliminary ==
Qualified for next round

23 Sept. 2004, 11:45

Rank	Athlete	Points	Notes
1	Roland Hartmann (GER)	535	Q
2	Andrey Lebedinsky (RUS)	533	Q
3	Hubert Aufschnaiter (AUT)	530	Q
4	Ivano Borgato (ITA)	528	Q
5	Branimir Jovanovski (MKD)	525	Q
6	Muharrem Korhan Yamac (TUR)	524	Q
7	Kai Uwe Liebehenz (GER)	524	Q
8	Damir Bosnjak (CRO)	523	Q
9	Jamal Asadi (IRI)	521	
10	Blaz Beljan (CRO)	518	
10	Jan Boonen (BEL)	518	
10	Zhao Shan Yuan (CHN)	518	
13	Yelena Taranova (AZE)	517	
14	Giancarlo Iori (ITA)	515	
15	Eliahu Chabra (ISR)	513	
16	Oskar Kreuzer (AUT)	512	
17	Kenji Ohashi (JPN)	511	
17	Choi Jong In (KOR)	511	
19	Nayyereh Akef (IRI)	506	
20	Otto Koller (SUI)	504	
21	Patrik Plattner (SUI)	503	
22	Vanco Karanfilov (MKD)	498	
23	Victor Stepanov (RUS)	496	
24	Kenneth Pettersson (SWE)	495	
24	Francisco Angel Soriano (ESP)	495	
26	Ilan Zaltsman (ISR)	490	
26	Olivera Nakovska (MKD)	490	

== Final round ==
23 Sept. 2004, 15:30

Rank	Athlete	Points	Notes
1st place, gold medalist(s)	Andrey Lebedinsky (RUS)	621.7	WR
2nd place, silver medalist(s)	Roland Hartmann (GER)	620.8	
3rd place, bronze medalist(s)	Muharrem Korhan Yamac (TUR)	619.1	
4	Kai Uwe Liebehenz (GER)	617.9	
5	Branimir Jovanovski (MKD)	613.5	
6	Hubert Aufschnaiter (AUT)	612.6	
7	Damir Bosnjak (CRO)	612.2	
8	Ivano Borgato (ITA)	599.6	
