= Shooting at the 2012 Summer Paralympics – Mixed 50 metre pistol SH1 =

Woolwich pistol shooting Event

Mixed 50 metre pistol SH1 at the XIV Paralympic Games
- Venue: Royal Artillery Barracks
- Dates: 6 September 2012

Medalists
1st place, gold medalist(s)		Park Sea-Kyun	South Korea
2nd place, silver medalist(s)		Valery Ponomarenko	Russia
3rd place, bronze medalist(s)		Hedong Ni	China

The Mixed 50 metre pistol SH1 event at the 2012 Summer Paralympics took place on 6 September at the Royal Artillery Barracks in Woolwich.

The event consisted of two rounds: a qualifier and a final. In the qualifier, each shooter fired 60 shots with a pistol at 50 metres distance from the "standing" (interpreted to include seated in wheelchairs) position. Scores for each shot were in increments of 1, with a maximum score of 10.

The top 8 shooters in the qualifying round moved on to the final round. There, they fired an additional 10 shots. These shots scored in increments of .1, with a maximum score of 10.9. The total scored from all 70 shots were used to determine the final ranking.

== Qualification round ==
Rank	Athlete	Country	1	2	3	4	5	6	Total	Notes
1	Park Sea-Kyun	South Korea	91	90	92	93	92	92	550	Q
2	Valery Ponomarenko	Russia	92	89	87	90	93	93	544	Q
3	Li Jianfei	China	86	88	93	87	94	87	535	Q
4	Ni Hedong	China	91	92	92	78	90	92	535	Q
5	Wojciech Kosowski	Poland	88	89	90	84	92	90	533	Q
6	Ru Decheng	China	88	86	92	90	92	84	532	Q
7	Muharrem Korhan Yamaç	Turkey	90	81	90	92	92	87	532	Q
8	Sergey Malyshev	Russia	90	88	88	86	90	89	531	Q
9	Giancarlo Iori	Italy	87	85	89	90	89	90	530	
10	Marco Pusinich	Italy	88	84	90	93	83	91	529	
11	Paul Schnider	Switzerland	87	90	89	84	89	87	526	
12	Seo Young-Kyun	South Korea	92	84	81	88	89	88	522	
13	Gyula Gurisatti	Hungary	87	91	84	82	88	88	520	
14	Cevat Karagöl	Turkey	83	86	89	89	84	88	519	
15	Soriano San Martín	Spain	86	84	87	85	87	90	519	
16	Krisztina Dávid	Hungary	90	86	85	88	83	85	517	
17	Olivera Nakovska-Bikova	Macedonia	88	84	87	84	88	84	515	
18	Akbar Muradov	Azerbaijan	82	90	84	90	88	81	515	
19	Lee Ju-Hee	South Korea	85	80	85	79	96	89	514	
20	Yelena Taranova	Ukraine	83	86	82	87	85	90	513	
21	Vadym Nesterenko	Ukraine	86	79	90	82	86	88	511	
22	Živko Papaz	Serbia	75	81	86	90	89	89	510	
23	Eric Hollen	United States	85	83	80	80	81	90	499	
24	Yunus Bahceci	Turkey	83	75	79	86	83	89	495	
25	Hubert Aufschnaiter	Austria	84	79	83	84	77	87	494	
26	Marino Heredia	Cuba	78	87	84	76	82	86	493	
27	Vanco Karanfilov	Macedonia	80	87	81	82	77	85	492	
28	Bjørn Morten Hagen	Norway	78	76	82	80	87	88	491	
29	Frank Heitmeyer	Germany	83	69	87	72	79	80	470	

Q Qualified for final

== Final ==
Rank	Athlete	Country	Qual	1	2	3	4	5	6	7	8	9	10	Final	Total
1	Park Sea-Kyun	South Korea	550	8.7	10.2	8.3	7.4	9.1	8.7	10.2	9.1	10.4	10.3	92.4	642.4
2	Valery Ponomarenko	Russia	544	8.1	8.1	8.7	8.3	9.6	7.9	8.8	10.5	9.2	10.0	89.2	633.2
3	Ni Hedong	China	535	9.5	6.5	7.0	10.3	9.9	9.1	9.1	10.3	9.9	8.7	90.3	625.3
4	Li Jianfei	China	535	9.3	7.7	9.6	8.3	8.8	8.7	9.1	10.1	8.3	9.6	89.5	624.5
5	Muharrem Korhan Yamaç	Turkey	532	10.2	7.1	9.3	10.5	10.4	9.4	8.6	10.2	8.6	7.5	91.8	623.8
6	Sergey Malyshev	Russia	531	10.4	8.7	10.6	9.6	9.1	8.0	10.7	9.3	7.1	8.8	92.3	623.3
7	Wojciech Kosowski	Poland	533	9.0	9.4	9.8	7.0	9.5	9.3	10.2	8.5	9.1	8.5	90.3	623.3
8	Ru Decheng	China	532	0.0	8.9	9.5	8.0	8.8	8.2	8.9	8.6	9.3	10.4	80.6	612.6
