= Shooting at the 2004 Summer Paralympics – Mixed 25 metre pistol SH1 =

Mixed 25m Sport Pistol SH1 at the XII Paralympic Games
- Paralympic Shooting
- Venue: Markopoulo Olympic Shooting Centre
- Dates: 21 September 2004
- Competitors: 23 from 15 nations
- Winning points: 672.4

Medalists
1st place, gold medalist(s)		Muharrem Korhan Yamac	Turkey
2nd place, silver medalist(s)		Hubert Aufschnaiter	Austria
3rd place, bronze medalist(s)		Andrey Lebedinsky	Russia

The Mixed 25m Sport Pistol SH1 shooting event at the 2004 Summer Paralympics was competed on 21 September. It was won by Muharrem Korhan Yamac, representing Turkey.

== Preliminary ==
Qualified for next round

21 Sept. 2004, 09:00

Rank	Athlete	Points	Notes
1	Muharrem Korhan Yamac (TUR)	574	WR Q
2	Hubert Aufschnaiter (AUT)	574	Q
3	Andrey Lebedinsky (RUS)	567	Q
4	Seppo Jolkkonen (FIN)	565	Q
5	Vonnie Koehne (RSA)	563	Q
6	Li Jian Fei (CHN)	563	Q
7	Huang Wei (CHN)	560	Q
8	Kenneth Pettersson (SWE)	560	Q
9	Zhao Shan Yuan (CHN)	558	
10	James Nomarhas (AUS)	557	
11	Jan Boonen (BEL)	555	
12	Vanco Karanfilov (MKD)	553	
13	Giancarlo Iori (ITA)	549	
14	Olivera Nakovska (MKD)	547	
15	Pavel Zachensky (SVK)	546	
15	Oskar Kreuzer (AUT)	546	
17	Karen van Nest (CAN)	540	
18	Francisco Angel Soriano (ESP)	539	
18	Victor Stepanov (RUS)	539	
20	Ivano Borgato (ITA)	538	
21	Christine Stoeckl (GER)	537	
22	Branimir Jovanovski (MKD)	531	
23	Roland Hartmann (GER)	519	

== Final round ==
21 Sept. 2004, 13:00

Rank	Athlete	Points	Notes
1st place, gold medalist(s)	Muharrem Korhan Yamac (TUR)	672.4	
2nd place, silver medalist(s)	Hubert Aufschnaiter (AUT)	672.0	
3rd place, bronze medalist(s)	Andrey Lebedinsky (RUS)	666.6	
4	Li Jian Fei (CHN)	662.7	
5	Seppo Jolkkonen (FIN)	661.6	
6	Vonnie Koehne (RSA)	660.4	
7	Huang Wei (CHN)	659.2	
8	Kenneth Pettersson (SWE)	648.5	
