= Shooting at the 2008 Summer Paralympics – Mixed 50 metre pistol SH1 =

Mixed 50 metre pistol SH1 at the XIII Paralympic Games
- Venue: Beijing Shooting Range Hall
- Dates: September 12, 2008
- Competitors: 30 from 17 nations

Medalists
1st place, gold medalist(s)		Park Sea-kyun	South Korea
2nd place, silver medalist(s)		Lee Ju-hee	South Korea
3rd place, bronze medalist(s)		Valeriy Ponomarenko	Russia

The Mixed 50 metre pistol SH1 event at the 2008 Summer Paralympics took place on September 12 at the Beijing Shooting Range Hall.

== Qualification round ==
Rank	Athlete	Country	1	2	3	4	5	6	Total	Notes
1	Park Sea-kyun	South Korea	90	91	92	93	89	97	552	Q
2	Valeriy Ponomarenko	Russia	89	90	91	93	90	89	542	Q
3	Lee Ju-hee	South Korea	88	89	91	92	90	91	541	Q
4	Bahman Karimi	Iran	88	84	93	90	96	85	536	Q
5	Ru Decheng	China	86	87	97	92	90	83	535	Q
6	M Korhan Yamac	Turkey	88	87	88	87	90	92	532	Q
7	Huang Wei	China	92	81	86	90	93	90	532	Q
8	Sergey Malyshev	Russia	88	84	93	90	91	86	532	Q
9	Li Jianfei	China	87	89	82	92	88	93	531	
10	Cevat Karagol	Turkey	85	85	88	82	92	90	522	
11	Hubert Aufschnaiter	Austria	84	87	82	89	91	89	522	
12	Damir Bosnjak	Croatia	84	88	91	87	89	82	521	
13	Kenji Ohashi	Japan	83	85	84	93	85	89	519	
14	Andrey Lebedinskiy	Russia	88	86	91	87	85	81	518	
15	Olivera Nakovska-Bikova	Macedonia	87	89	90	85	87	80	518	
16	Yelena Taranova	Azerbaijan	85	89	85	89	80	89	517	
17	Bernard Lamoureux	France	84	90	86	80	83	90	513	
18	Harald Hack	Germany	88	79	88	82	92	84	513	
19	Francisco Angel Soriano	Spain	86	89	82	85	89	81	512	
20	Giancarlo Iori	Italy	85	88	89	81	88	80	511	
21	Gyula Gurisatti	Hungary	80	91	87	80	88	84	510	
22	Vanco Karanfilov	Macedonia	84	83	81	84	88	87	507	
23	Nayyereh Akef	Iran	88	91	82	89	79	78	507	
24	Jose Luis Martinez	Spain	82	88	83	85	80	86	504	
25	Ivano Borgato	Italy	83	84	87	84	85	77	500	
26	Bae Young-ee	South Korea	80	84	84	86	78	87	499	
27	Zivko Papaz	Serbia	83	83	84	84	85	80	499	
28	Aleksandar Janda	Serbia	87	79	82	80	81	86	495	
29	Antonio Martella	Italy	80	66	88	73	83	84	474	
30	Tetiana Podziuban	Ukraine	75	77	79	75	86	78	470	

Q Qualified for final

== Final ==
Rank	Athlete	Country	Qual	1	2	3	4	5	6	7	8	9	10	Final	Total	Shoot-off
1	Park Sea-kyun	South Korea	552	9.3	10.0	7.6	8.6	9.7	9.4	10.0	8.7	10.3	9.3	92.9	644.9	
2	Lee Ju-hee	South Korea	541	8.3	9.2	9.0	7.0	8.0	8.8	10.4	9.7	9.4	9.3	89.1	630.1	
3	Valeriy Ponomarenko	Russia	542	6.5	6.5	9.1	7.3	10.1	9.0	10.6	8.4	7.8	10.5	85.8	627.8	
4	Ru Decheng	China	535	8.8	7.6	10.3	8.0	8.5	9.4	9.9	9.9	9.6	10.0	92.0	627.0	
5	Sergey Malyshev	Russia	532	9.2	7.3	9.8	10.3	9.8	10.6	8.0	8.4	8.9	9.5	91.8	623.8	
6	Bahman Karimi	Iran	536	8.5	10.0	9.7	9.4	9.0	7.0	8.8	8.1	9.2	7.0	86.7	622.7	8.1
7	M Korhan Yamac	Turkey	532	10.2	8.8	8.3	9.7	9.2	8.2	9.5	7.4	9.8	9.6	90.7	622.7	7.3
8	Huang Wei	China	532	10.5	8.5	8.3	8.1	10.0	8.4	8.6	9.8	7.8	9.5	89.5	621.5	
