= Shooting at the 2008 Summer Paralympics – Mixed 25 metre pistol SH1 =

Mixed 25 metre pistol SH1 at the XIII Paralympic Games
- Venue: Beijing Shooting Range Hall
- Dates: September 10, 2008
- Competitors: 27 from 17 nations

Medalists
1st place, gold medalist(s)		Andrey Lebedinskiy	Russia
2nd place, silver medalist(s)		Li Jianfei	China
3rd place, bronze medalist(s)		Valeriy Ponomarenko	Russia

The Mixed 25 metre pistol SH1 event at the 2008 Summer Paralympics took place on September 10 at the Beijing Shooting Range Hall. In the qualification round groups 1-3 were precision, 4-6 rapid-fire.

== Qualification round ==
Rank	Athlete	Country	1	2	3	4	5	6	Total	Notes
1	Andrey Lebedinskiy	Russia	89	94	97	98	97	99	574	Q
2	Valeriy Ponomarenko	Russia	97	95	95	93	96	97	573	Q
3	Li Jianfei	China	96	97	93	96	96	95	573	Q
4	Lee Ju-hee	South Korea	97	98	96	95	90	95	571	Q
5	Antonio Martella	Italy	94	98	97	90	95	96	570	Q
6	Sergey Malyshev	Russia	96	96	95	91	96	95	569	Q
7	Huang Wei	China	96	91	98	98	90	94	567	Q
8	Hubert Aufschnaiter	Austria	97	94	91	95	94	90	561	Q
9	Harald Hack	Germany	95	93	93	94	92	91	558	
10	Giancarlo Iori	Italy	94	93	93	91	94	91	556	
11	Patrik Plattner	Switzerland	91	97	95	89	90	93	555	
12	Kenneth Pettersson	Sweden	93	94	99	91	85	92	554	
13	Vanco Karanfilov	Macedonia	96	93	94	91	95	85	554	
14	Damir Bosnjak	Croatia	91	97	93	91	93	88	553	
15	Olivera Nakovska-Bikova	Macedonia	97	97	93	94	85	87	553	
16	M Korhan Yamac	Turkey	95	86	96	94	91	90	552	
17	Ni Hedong	China	94	90	89	87	94	97	551	
18	Oliviero Tiso	Italy	91	95	93	90	88	94	551	
19	Gyula Gurisatti	Hungary	95	90	93	92	91	90	551	
20	Manuel Kruger	Germany	89	94	92	89	93	93	550	
21	Zivko Papaz	Serbia	97	90	90	91	88	93	549	
22	Bernard Lamoureux	France	94	93	86	92	90	91	546	
23	Frank Heitmeyer	Germany	93	86	94	90	92	90	545	
24	Jose Luis Martinez	Spain	90	87	94	94	88	88	541	
25	Yelena Taranova	Azerbaijan	91	94	94	89	77	82	527	
26	Vladimir Marcan	Czech Republic	78	85	84	84	83	88	502	
	Francisco Angel Soriano	Spain								DNS

Q Qualified for final

== Final ==
Rank	Athlete	Country	Qual	1 11	2 12	3 13	4 14	5 15	6 16	7 17	8 18	9 19	10 20	Final	Total
1	Andrey Lebedinskiy	Russia	574	8.0; 9.5	10.0; 9.9	10.1; 10.5	10.2; 10.1	10.1; 9.1	10.2; 9.4	10.6; 10.6	10.8; 10.4	10.7; 10.3	10.3; 9.9	200.7	774.7
2	Li Jianfei	China	573	10.7; 10.0	10.0; 10.3	10.3; 10.3	10.3; 10.4	10.3; 10.4	8.8; 9.5	10.2; 10.2	10.1; 9.1	10.1; 10.5	9.8; 10.0	201.3	774.3
3	Valeriy Ponomarenko	Russia	573	9.5; 7.1	10.3; 10.1	9.2; 10.1	10.1; 10.3	9.8; 9.8	10.0; 10.7	9.5; 9.2	10.8; 10.3	10.6; 10.6	8.3; 9.6	195.9	768.9
4	Lee Ju-hee	South Korea	571	10.3; 9.7	8.7; 9.5	10.4; 9.5	10.8; 9.6	10.8; 8.5	10.2; 9.4	9.9; 9.5	10.8; 9.5	10.6; 7.2	10.8; 9.7	195.4	766.4
5	Huang Wei	China	567	9.7; 10.3	9.5; 8.4	10.4; 10.4	9.7; 10.6	10.6; 10.3	8.1; 10.6	9.4; 9.5	9.7; 10.3	9.6; 10.3	9.9; 10.2	197.5	764.5
6	Sergey Malyshev	Russia	569	9.5; 7.9	9.2; 10.8	10.3; 9.5	10.1; 10.3	10.7; 8.8	9.6; 9.4	9.4; 9.9	10.3; 8.9	8.2; 10.6	10.2; 10.3	193.9	762.9
7	Antonio Martella	Italy	570	9.6; 9.1	9.4; 10.1	9.5; 9.7	9.1; 10.1	10.3; 7.0	10.6; 10.2	9.8; 10.4	10.5; 10.1	10.4; 10.6	8.1; 7.4	192.0	762.0
8	Hubert Aufschnaiter	Austria	561	10.0; 10.0	10.5; 8.3	10.4; 10.4	8.2; 9.8	10.2; 10.6	9.6; 10.3	10.0; 10.5	10.1; 10.5	10.5; 10.1	10.5; 10.3	200.8	761.8
