= Shooting at the 2008 Summer Paralympics – Men's 10 metre air pistol SH1 =

Men's 10 metre air pistol standing SH1 at the XIII Paralympic Games
- Venue: Beijing Shooting Range Hall
- Dates: September 7, 2008
- Competitors: 34 from 20 nations

Medalists
1st place, gold medalist(s)		Valeriy Ponomarenko	Russia
2nd place, silver medalist(s)		Sergey Malyshev	Russia
3rd place, bronze medalist(s)		Lee Ju-hee	South Korea

The Men's 10 metre air pistol standing SH1 event at the 2008 Summer Paralympics took place on September 7 at the Beijing Shooting Range Hall.

== Qualification round ==
Rank	Athlete	Country	1	2	3	4	5	6	Total	Notes
1	Valeriy Ponomarenko	Russia	99	97	93	96	94	99	578	Q
2	Sergey Malyshev	Russia	93	95	94	96	95	96	569	Q
3	Park Sea-kyun	South Korea	95	91	96	96	95	95	568	Q
4	Lee Ju-hee	South Korea	94	96	94	95	95	94	568	Q
5	Li Jianfei	China	97	95	96	92	94	93	567	Q
6	Ru Decheng	China	92	94	98	92	94	96	566	Q
7	Andrey Lebedinskiy	Russia	93	95	93	94	93	96	564	Q
8	M Korhan Yamac	Turkey	96	93	93	96	94	91	563	Q
9	Damir Bosnjak	Croatia	93	93	94	93	95	94	562	
10	Hubert Aufschnaiter	Austria	97	95	93	87	97	93	562	
11	Ni Hedong	China	92	93	95	95	95	92	562	
12	Bernard Lamoureux	France	91	91	93	93	98	95	561	
13	Evripides Georgiou	Cyprus	91	88	93	96	95	97	560	
14	Bahman Karimi	Iran	94	94	94	90	95	93	560	
15	Cevat Karagol	Turkey	91	93	97	90	93	95	559	
16	Kenneth Pettersson	Sweden	91	92	91	95	95	94	558	
17	Giancarlo Iori	Italy	91	94	91	95	94	92	557	
18	Harald Hack	Germany	95	93	89	91	92	96	556	
19	Wojciech Kosowski	Poland	93	90	93	92	93	95	556	
20	Antonio Martella	Italy	91	91	93	94	93	93	555	
21	Kenji Ohashi	Japan	94	94	96	91	91	89	555	
22	Sebastian Hume	Australia	93	90	92	94	92	92	553	
23	Patrik Plattner	Switzerland	90	92	92	88	95	95	552	
24	Slawomir Okoniewski	Poland	96	90	89	90	94	92	551	
25	Gyula Gurisatti	Hungary	93	90	95	94	88	91	551	
26	Manuel Kruger	Germany	91	94	93	92	91	90	551	
27	Vanco Karanfilov	Macedonia	90	93	88	92	92	94	549	
28	Frank Heitmeyer	Germany	89	93	92	89	95	91	549	
29	Francisco Angel Soriano	Spain	92	94	92	88	94	88	548	
30	Filip Rodzik	Poland	93	89	94	85	89	94	544	
31	Aleksandar Janda	Serbia	87	91	92	89	90	92	541	
32	Jose Luis Martinez	Spain	83	93	90	91	88	93	538	
33	Zivko Papaz	Serbia	90	87	90	91	89	91	538	
34	Oliviero Tiso	Italy	91	87	86	85	89	89	527	

Q Qualified for final

== Final ==
Rank	Athlete	Country	Qual	1	2	3	4	5	6	7	8	9	10	Final	Total
1	Valeriy Ponomarenko	Russia	578	8.3	10.6	9.8	9.5	8.6	9.7	8.7	8.1	10.5	10.6	94.4	672.4
2	Sergey Malyshev	Russia	569	8.5	10.0	9.6	9.8	9.7	8.8	9.5	10.6	9.7	10.6	96.8	665.8
3	Lee Ju-hee	South Korea	568	9.4	9.7	10.2	9.6	9.7	9.5	9.9	7.6	10.3	10.7	96.6	664.6
4	Andrey Lebedinskiy	Russia	564	10.8	9.0	10.0	9.4	10.2	10.2	10.5	9.5	10.3	9.8	99.7	663.7
5	Ru Decheng	China	566	9.4	10.2	9.3	10.2	9.8	9.8	8.9	10.0	9.5	9.7	96.8	662.8
6	Li Jianfei	China	567	9.9	9.6	8.9	10.0	9.3	9.4	10.6	9.4	10.0	8.1	95.2	662.2
7	Park Sea-kyun	South Korea	568	9.3	8.5	10.0	9.1	9.6	8.9	8.5	10.1	10.0	8.9	92.9	660.9
8	M Korhan Yamac	Turkey	563	8.2	10.2	10.5	9.9	10.7	9.9	7.4	8.5	9.3	10.8	95.4	658.4
