= Shooting at the 2016 Summer Paralympics – Women's 10 metre air pistol SH1 =

Women's 10 metre air pistol SH1 at the XV Paralympic Games
- Venue: Rio Olympic Shooting Centre
- Dates: 9 September 2016
- Competitors: 19 from 14 nations

Medalists
1st place, gold medalist(s)		Sareh Javanmardi	Iran
2nd place, silver medalist(s)		Olga Kovalchuk	Ukraine
3rd place, bronze medalist(s)		Aysegul Pehlivanlar	Turkey

The Women's 10 metre air pistol SH1 event at the 2016 Summer Paralympics took place on 9 September at the Olympic Shooting Centre in Rio.

The event consisted of two rounds: a qualifier and a final. In the qualifier, each shooter fired 40 shots with an air rifle at 10 metres distance from the "standing" (interpreted to include seated in wheelchairs) position. Scores for each shot were in increments of 1, with a maximum score of 10.

The top 8 shooters in the qualifying round moved on to the final round. There, they fired an additional 10 shots. These shots scored in increments of .1, with a maximum score of 10.9. The total score from all 50 shots were used to determine the final ranking.

== Qualification round ==
Rank	Athlete	Country	1	2	3	4	Total	Notes
1	Alieh Mahmoudikordkheili	Iran	95	94	92	95	376	Q
2	Sareh Javanmardi	Iran	97	91	93	95	376	Q
3	Olivera Nakovska-Bikova	Macedonia	94	93	94	93	374	Q
4	Krisztina David	Hungary	90	91	94	96	371	Q
5	Yelena Taranova	Azerbaijan	92	96	92	90	370	Q
6	Aysegul Pehlivanlar	Turkey	91	94	89	94	368	Q
7	Aysel Ozgan	Turkey	95	90	91	90	366	Q
8	Olga Kovalchuk	Ukraine	89	91	92	92	364	Q
9	Kim Youn-mi	South Korea	93	89	89	93	364	
10	Anne-Cathrine Kruger	Norway	93	88	94	87	362	
11	Bai Xiaohong	China	91	90	87	93	361	
12	Nadia Fario	Italy	92	87	93	88	360	
13	Debora Campos	Brazil	92	89	88	90	359	
14	Issy Bailey	Great Britain	89	90	89	91	359	
15	Iryna Liakhu	Ukraine	85	90	90	93	358	
16	Samira Eram	Iran	90	90	92	86	358	
17	Somporn Muangsiri	Thailand	91	85	90	90	356	
18	Ahn Kyoung Hee	South Korea	89	92	91	83	355	
19	Tricia Downing	United States	86	87	77	87	337	

Q – Qualified for final

== Final ==
Rank	Athlete	Country	1	2	3	4	5	6	7	8	9	Total	Notes
1st place, gold medalist(s)	Sareh Javanmardi	Iran	30.0	28.5	20.5	17.0	19.7	19.3	19.1	19.4	19.9	193.4	FPR
2nd place, silver medalist(s)	Olga Kovalchuk	Ukraine	26.7	28.8	18.8	19.4	20.2	19.6	19.8	19.3	18.6	191.2	
3rd place, bronze medalist(s)	Aysegul Pehlivanlar	Turkey	29.3	28.3	19.0	17.4	18.9	20.3	20.2	18.9		172.3	
4	Yelena Taranova	Azerbaijan	27.0	28.8	19.3	18.1	18.7	20.2	16.7			148.8	
5	Krisztina David	Hungary	25.2	28.2	20.2	19.5	18.7	17.0				128.8	
6	Aysel Ozgan	Turkey	26.3	30.0	20.3	16.4	17.1					110.1	
7	Olivera Nakovska-Bikova	Macedonia	30.0	27.6	19.1	16.1						92.8	
8	Alieh Mahmoudikordkheili	Iran	25.6	28.9	18.2							72.7	
