= Shooting at the 2008 Summer Paralympics – Women's 10 metre air pistol SH1 =

Women's 10 metre air pistol SH1 at the XIII Paralympic Games
- Venue: Beijing Shooting Range Hall
- Dates: September 8, 2008
- Competitors: 17 from 15 nations

Medalists
1st place, gold medalist(s)		Lin Haiyan	China
2nd place, silver medalist(s)		Moon Aee-kyung	South Korea
3rd place, bronze medalist(s)		Natalia Dalekova	Russia

The Women's 10 metre air pistol SH1 event at the 2008 Summer Paralympics took place on September 8 at the Beijing Shooting Range Hall.

== Qualification round ==
Rank	Athlete	Country	1	2	3	4	Total	Notes
1	Lin Haiyan	China	92	94	95	93	374	Q
2	Moon Aee-kyung	South Korea	93	94	94	93	374	Q
3	Anastasia Panteleeva	Russia	92	95	93	89	369	Q
4	Olivera Nakovska-Bikova	Macedonia	89	91	94	94	368	Q
5	Natalia Dalekova	Russia	91	90	91	94	366	Q
6	Aysel Ozgan	Turkey	95	92	91	88	366	Q
7	Bae Young-ee	South Korea	87	88	93	96	364	Q
8	Yelena Taranova	Azerbaijan	89	92	90	93	364	Q
9	Eleni Zampoura	Greece	88	92	88	92	360	
10	Karen Van Nest	Canada	89	91	91	89	360	
11	Nayyereh Akef	Iran	93	93	86	88	360	
12	Lin Chin-mei	Chinese Taipei	92	88	89	88	357	
13	Tetiana Podziuban	Ukraine	91	87	86	90	354	
14	Barbara Doppler	Austria	88	87	90	89	354	
15	Leung Yuk Chun	Hong Kong	89	83	91	81	344	
16	Nasanbat Yadamsuren	Mongolia	86	88	85	82	341	
	Doris Kustner	Germany						DSQ

Q Qualified for final

== Final ==
Rank	Athlete	Country	Qual	1	2	3	4	5	6	7	8	9	10	Final	Total	Shoot-off
1	Lin Haiyan	China	374	9.1	9.6	9.4	8.5	9.7	8.8	10.3	9.8	10.2	8.3	93.7	467.7	
2	Moon Aee-kyung	South Korea	374	10.2	10.2	8.8	9.0	6.6	8.9	8.7	10.0	9.3	7.5	89.2	463.2	
3	Natalia Dalekova	Russia	366	10.2	9.1	10.1	8.1	9.4	9.8	9.9	10.5	9.6	9.9	96.6	462.6	
4	Anastasia Panteleeva	Russia	369	8.9	10.9	9.4	9.1	7.9	10.3	8.7	9.5	10.5	8.3	93.5	462.5	
5	Olivera Nakovska-Bikova	Macedonia	368	9.0	9.8	10.1	8.1	8.6	9.5	10.2	9.4	10.5	8.9	94.1	462.1	
6	Yelena Taranova	Azerbaijan	364	10.9	9.8	8.7	9.3	8.9	9.7	8.9	9.9	10.5	9.5	96.1	460.1	
7	Aysel Ozgan	Turkey	366	7.7	8.9	9.5	9.4	8.4	8.5	8.1	10.3	10.8	8.6	90.2	456.2	10.6
8	Bae Young-ee	South Korea	364	8.7	9.4	9.9	9.8	8.0	9.1	7.0	9.8	10.6	9.9	92.2	456.2	9.2
