= North Macedonia at the Paralympics =

- Flag of North Macedonia
- IPC code: MKD
- NPC: Macedonian Paralympic Committee
- Website: www.fsrim.org.mk
- Medals: Gold 1 Silver 1 Bronze 0 Total 2

Summer appearances
- 1996; 2000; 2004; 2008; 2012; 2016; 2020; 2024

Other related appearances
- Yugoslavia (1972–2000)

North Macedonia, following its independence from Yugoslavia in 1991, made its Paralympic Games début at the 1996 Summer Paralympics in Atlanta, where it sent a single athlete (Branimir Jovanovski) to compete in shooting. The country has competed in every subsequent edition of the Summer Paralympics, with very small delegations. They will be participating at the Winter Paralympics for the first time at the 2026 Winter Paralympics in Milan and Cortina d'Ampezzo, sending a wild card invitation for a single competitor to compete in para alpine skiing. It had never taken part in the Winter Paralympics before that. The only athletes to have represented North Macedonia at the Paralympic Games are Branimir Jovanovski (1996–2004), Vanco Karanfilov (2000–2016) and Olivera Nakovska (2004–2020), all three in shooting events.

At the 2004 Games in Athens, Karanfilov won North Macedonia's first Paralympic medal as independent country: a silver in the men's air pistol event (category SH1).

At the 2012 Games in London, Olivera Nakovska-Bikova won North Macedonia's first gold Paralympic medal as independent country: a gold medal in women's air pistol event (category SH1), setting new world and Paralympic record at qualifiers for Women's P2-10m Air Pistol-SH1 with 381 points, and also setting new Paralympic finals record for Women's P2-10m Air Pistol-SH1 with 475.7 points.

== Medallists ==
Medal	Name	Games	Sport	Event	Score
Silver	Vanco Karanfilov	2004 Athens	Shooting	Men's Air Pistol SH1	661.6 points
Gold	Olivera Nakovska-Bikova	2012 London	Shooting	Women's Air Pistol SH1	475.7 points

Several other athletes from the Socialist Republic of Macedonia (a constituent country of the former SFR Yugoslavia) have also won Olympic medals, competing as part of Yugoslavia, and as Independent Paralympic Participants

As part of SFR Yugoslavia:

Medal	Name	Games	Sport	Event
Bronze	Vangel Zabev	1980 Arnhem	Swimming	50 m freestyle E1
Bronze	Vangel Zabev	1980 Arnhem	Swimming	3x50 m individual medley E1

As Independent Paralympic Participants:

Medal	Name	Games	Sport	Event
Gold	Branimir Jovanovski	1992 Barcelona	Shooting	Men's air pistol SH1

== See also ==
- North Macedonia at the Olympics
