= Shooting at the 2012 Summer Paralympics – Mixed 25 metre pistol SH1 =

Mixed 25 metre pistol SH1 at the XIV Paralympic Games
- Venue: Royal Artillery Barracks
- Dates: 3 September 2012
- Competitors: 22 from 14 nations

Medalists
1st place, gold medalist(s)		Li Jianfei	China
2nd place, silver medalist(s)		Sergey Malyshev	Russia
3rd place, bronze medalist(s)		Valery Ponomarenko	Russia

The Mixed 25 metre pistol SH1 event at the 2012 Summer Paralympics took place on 3 September at the Royal Artillery Barracks in Woolwich.

The event consisted of two rounds: a qualifier and a final. In the qualifier, each shooter fired 60 shots with a pistol at 25 metres distance from the "standing" (interpreted to include seated in wheelchairs) position. Scores for each shot are in increments of 1, with a maximum score of 10. In the qualification round groups 1-3 were shot under precision rules, 4-6 under rapid-fire rules.

The top 8 shooters in the qualifying round moved on to the final round. There, they fired an additional 20 shots. These shots scored in increments of 0.1, with a maximum score of 10.9. The total score from all 80 shots were used to determine the final ranking.

== Qualification round ==
Rank	Athlete	Country	G	1	2	3	4	5	6	Total	Shoot-off	Notes
1	Sergey Malyshev	Russia	M	91	99	96	99	92	97	574-20x		Q
2	M Korhan Yamac	Turkey	M	99	95	95	96	98	90	573- 6x		Q
3	Li Jianfei	China	M	94	97	96	93	94	93	567-11x		Q
4	Valery Ponomarenko	Russia	M	94	92	96	94	92	96	564-10x		Q
5	Ni Hedong	China	M	92	95	95	95	90	96	563- 9x		Q
6	Lee Juhee	South Korea	M	90	91	95	99	93	94	562-10x		Q
7	Zivko Papaz	Serbia	M	90	93	93	92	95	97	560-15x		Q
8	Park Seakyun	South Korea	M	94	97	97	97	84	90	559- 9x	46.0	Q
9	Bjorn Morten Hagen	Norway	M	93	90	96	90	96	94	559- 5x	45.0	
10	Vanco Karanfilov	Macedonia	M	96	92	90	96	90	92	556- 9x		
11	Francisco Ángel Soriano San Martin	Spain	M	90	94	95	93	91	91	554- 9x		
12	Nakovska-Bikova Olivera	Macedonia	W	89	93	95	93	94	89	553-10x		
13=	Frank Heitmeyer	Germany	M	90	91	90	93	94	93	551-10x		
13=	Paul Schnider	Switzerland	M	93	93	95	88	90	92	551-10x*		
15	Hubert Aufschnaiter	Austria	M	95	93	97	86	91	89	551- 7x		
16	Akbar Muradov	Azerbaijan	M	95	95	96	84	88	91	549-10x		
17	Andrey Lebedinskiy	Russia	M	92	93	94	96	88	84	547- 9x		
18	Gyula Gurisatti	Hungary	M	92	95	93	85	88	92	545- 4x		
19	Giancarlo Iori	Italy	M	97	96	97	83	82	89	544-12x		
20	Krisztina David	Hungary	W	85	96	93	90	88	90	542- 5x		
21	Yunus Bahceci	Turkey	M	86	93	88	89	91	88	535- 2x		
	Yelena Taranova	Azerbaijan	W									DNS

Q = Qualified for final. DNS = Did Not Start. * Penalised under ISSF Rule 8.6.6.1.1.1 - Too many shots fired.

== Final ==
All qualifiers were male.

Rank	Athlete	Country	Qual	1 11	2 12	3 13	4 14	5 15	6 16	7 17	8 18	9 19	10 20	Final	Total
1st place, gold medalist(s)	Li Jianfei	China	567	10.7; 10.5	9.5; 10.5	10.5; 10.6	9.9; 9.2	10.9; 9.7	9.8; 9.8	10.0; 10.8	9.6; 10.5	9.8; 10.0	10.4; 10.6	203.3	770.3
2nd place, silver medalist(s)	Sergey Malyshev	Russia	574	10.4; 9.4	9.9; 6.4	9.6; 10.2	8.7; 10.1	10.2; 10.4	8.0; 10.2	10.7; 8.0	10.2; 10.4	9.9; 8.7	9.9; 10.2	191.5	765.5
3rd place, bronze medalist(s)	Valery Ponomarenko	Russia	564	9.7; 9.9	9.5; 10.2	10.7; 10.8	10.1; 10.4	10.2; 10.1	9.2; 10.5	9.4; 9.7	10.4; 10.3	9.9; 10.8	10.1; 9.0	200.9	764.9
4	M Korhan Yamac	Turkey	573	10.6; 10.5	9.9; 7.3	10.5; 8.6	8.1; 10.0	10.5; 8.5	9.6; 10.0	8.7; 10.1	10.2; 8.4	8.0; 10.1	9.9; 10.6	190.1	763.1
5	Lee Juhee	South Korea	562	8.6; 10.4	9.0; 10.1	10.8; 10.8	10.3; 10.5	9.9; 10.4	9.9; 8.5	9.8; 10.8	9.4; 10.2	10.2; 10.0	10.7; 10.3	200.6	762.6
6	Ni Hedong	China	563	8.7; 10.1	10.1; 9.9	10.2; 9.1	9.6; 9.7	10.1; 9.9	9.3; 10.4	10.6; 10.1	10.8; 10.5	10.5; 8.9	10.0; 10.5	199.0	762.0
7	Zivko Papaz	Serbia	560	9.2; 10.6	8.7; 10.4	10.4; 10.3	9.6; 10.6	9.1; 10.8	10.6; 10.9	8.7; 10.4	10.0; 9.4	8.1; 8.8	10.4; 8.5	195.5	755.5
8	Park Seakyun	South Korea	559	10.0; 10.0	10.5; 9.2	10.5; 10.4	0.0; 10.3	9.0; 10.0	9.2; 10.4	9.1; 9.8	10.4; 8.7	10.1; 9.6	9.1; 9.5	185.8	744.8
