= Shooting at the 2012 Summer Paralympics =

Shooting at the XIV Paralympic Games
- Venue: Royal Artillery Barracks, Woolwich
- Dates: 30 August – 6 September 2012
- Competitors: 140 (99 men and 41 women) from 44 nations

Shooting at the 2012 Summer Paralympics consisted of twelve events. The competition was held in the Royal Artillery Barracks in Woolwich from 30 August to 6 September.

== Classification ==
Paralympic shooters were classified according to the extent of their disability. The classification system allowed shooters to compete against others with a similar level of function.

Shooting classifications are:

- SH1 - competitors who do not need a shooting stand
- SH2 - competitors who use a shooting stand to support the firearm's weight

== Events ==
For each of the events below, medals were contested for one or both of the above classifications. After each classification was given the date that the event was contested.

- P1 Men's 10 m air pistol
  - SH1 - 30 August
- R1 Men's 10 m air rifle standing
  - SH1 - 31 August
- R7 Men's 50 m rifle 3 positions
  - SH1 - 5 September
- P2 Women's 10 m air pistol
  - SH1 - 31 August
- R2 Women's 10 m air rifle standing
  - SH1 - 30 August
- R8 Women's 50 m rifle 3 positions
  - SH1 - 6 September
- P3 Mixed 25 m pistol
  - SH1 - 3 September
- P4 Mixed 50 m pistol
  - SH1 - 6 September
- R3/R5 Mixed 10 m air rifle prone
  - SH1 - 1 September
  - SH2 - 1 September
- R4 Mixed 10 m air rifle standing
  - SH2 - 2 September
- R6 Mixed 50 m rifle prone
  - SH1 - 4 September

== Participating nations ==
There were 140 athletes (99 male, 41 female) taking part in this sport.

- Argentina (1)
- Australia (6)
- Austria (1)
- Azerbaijan (2)
- Brazil (1)
- Canada (2)
- China (9)
- Chinese Taipei (1)
- Croatia (2)
- Cuba (1)
- Cyprus (1)
- Denmark (2)
- Finland (2)
- France (5)
- Germany (8)
- Great Britain (12)
- Greece (2)
- Hong Kong (1)
- Hungary (2)
- India (1)
- Iran (2)
- Iraq (1)
- Ireland (1)
- Israel (1)
- Italy (5)
- Japan (2)
- Macedonia (2)
- Mongolia (1)
- New Zealand (1)
- Norway (3)
- Poland (2)
- Russia (7)
- Serbia (5)
- Slovakia (3)
- Slovenia (3)
- South Korea (12)
- Spain (3)
- Sweden (4)
- Switzerland (1)
- Thailand (4)
- Turkey (5)
- Ukraine (6)
- United Arab Emirates (2)
- United States (2)

== Medal summary ==
=== Medal table ===
This ranking sorts countries by the number of gold medals earned by their shooters (in this context a nation is an entity represented by a National Paralympic Committee). The number of silver medals is taken into consideration next and then the number of bronze medals. If, after the above, countries are still tied, equal ranking is given and they are listed alphabetically.

Rank	Nation	Gold	Silver	Bronze	Total
1	China (CHN)	4	1	3	8
2	South Korea (KOR)	3	0	1	4
3	France (FRA)	1	1	0	2
3	Sweden (SWE)	1	1	0	2
5	Macedonia (MKD)	1	0	0	1
5	Ukraine (UKR)	1	0	0	1
5	United Arab Emirates (UAE)	1	0	0	1
8	Russia (RUS)	0	3	1	4
9	Great Britain (GBR)	0	1	2	3
10	Germany (GER)	0	1	1	2
11	Israel (ISR)	0	1	0	1
11	Slovenia (SLO)	0	1	0	1
11	Spain (ESP)	0	1	0	1
11	Turkey (TUR)	0	1	0	1
15	Australia (AUS)	0	0	1	1
15	Iran (IRI)	0	0	1	1
15	New Zealand (NZL)	0	0	1	1
15	Slovakia (SVK)	0	0	1	1
Totals (18 entries)		12	12	12	36

=== Medalists ===
Event	Gold	Silver	Bronze
P1 Men's 10m air pistol SH1	Park Sea-Kyun; South Korea	Muharrem Korhan Yamaç; Turkey	Lee Ju-Hee; South Korea
R1 Men's 10m air rifle standing SH1	Dong Chao; China	Jonas Jacobsson; Sweden	Josef Neumaier; Germany
R7 Men's 50m rifle 3 positions SH1	Jonas Jacobsson; Sweden	Doron Shaziri; Israel	Dong Chao; China
P2 Women's 10m air pistol SH1	Olivera Nakovska-Bikova; Macedonia	Marina Klimenchenko; Russia	Sareh Javanmardi; Iran
R2 Women's 10m air rifle standing SH1	Cuiping Zhang; China	Manuela Schmermund; Germany	Natalie Smith; Australia
R8 Women's 50m rifle 3 positions SH1	Cuiping Zhang; China	Shibei Dang; China	Veronika Vadovičová; Slovakia
P3 Mixed 25m pistol SH1	Jianfei Li; China	Sergey Malyshev; Russia	Valery Ponomarenko; Russia
P4 Mixed 50m pistol SH1	Park Sea-Kyun; South Korea	Valery Ponomarenko; Russia	Hedong Ni; China
R3 Mixed 10m air rifle prone SH1	Cédric Fèvre; France	Matt Skelhon; Great Britain	Cuiping Zhang; China
R5 Mixed 10m air rifle prone SH2	Vasyl Kovalchuk; Ukraine	Raphaël Voltz; France	James Bevis; Great Britain
R4 Mixed 10m air rifle standing SH2	Ju-Young Kang; South Korea	Franček Gorazd Tiršek; Slovenia	Michael Johnson; New Zealand
R6 Mixed 50m rifle prone SH1	Abdullah Sultan Alaryani; United Arab Emirates	Juan Antonio Saavedra Reinaldo; Spain	Matthew Skelhon; Great Britain

== See also ==
- Paralympic shooting
- Shooting at the 2012 Summer Olympics
