= Shooting at the 2012 Summer Paralympics – Women's 10 metre air pistol SH1 =

Women's 10 metre air pistol standing SH1 at the XIV Paralympic Games
- Venue: Royal Artillery Barracks
- Dates: 31 August 2012
- Competitors: 14 from 11 nations

Medalists
1st place, gold medalist(s)		Olivera Nakovska-Bikova	Macedonia
2nd place, silver medalist(s)		Marina Klimchenko	Russia
3rd place, bronze medalist(s)		Sareh Javanmardi	Iran

The Women's 10 metre air pistol SH1 event at the 2012 Summer Paralympics took place on 31 August at the Royal Artillery Barracks in Woolwich.

The event consists of two rounds: a qualifier and a final. In the qualifier, each shooter fires 40 shots with an air pistol at 10 metres distance from the "standing" (interpreted to include seated in wheelchairs) position. Scores for each shot are in increments of 1, with a maximum score of 10.

The top 8 shooters in the qualifying round move on to the final round. There, they fire an additional 10 shots. These shots score in increments of .1, with a maximum score of 10.9. The total score from all 50 shots is used to determine final ranking.

== Qualification round ==
Rank	Athlete	Country	1	2	3	4	Total	Notes
1	Olivera Nakovska-Bikova	Macedonia	94	97	95	95	381	WR, PR, Q
2	Marina Klimenchenko	Russia	96	95	93	94	378	
3	Sareh Javanmardi	Iran	96	92	94	94	376	
4	Alieh Mahmoudi	Iran	94	92	91	97	374	
5	Yelena Taranova	Azerbaijan	94	98	88	92	372	
6	Myungsoon Park	South Korea	92	93	91	93	369	
7	Olga Mustafeiva	Ukraine	90	91	93	94	368	
8	Natalia Dalekova	Russia	92	92	91	92	367	QS: 51.5
9	Krisztina David	Hungary	90	92	92	93	367	QS: 43.7
10	Aysel Ozgan	Turkey	92	91	89	89	361	
11	Mirjana Ilic-Djuricin	Serbia	90	91	87	90	358	
12	Yuk Chun Leung	Hong Kong	91	89	89	86	355	
13	Anastasiia Skok	Ukraine	93	87	84	84	348	
14	Lkhamsuren Tsedendash	Mongolia	85	79	82	81	327	

Q Qualified for final

== Final ==
Rank	Athlete	Country	Qual	1	2	3	4	5	6	7	8	9	10	Final	Total
1	Olivera Nakovska-Bikova	Macedonia	381	9.5	9.4	9.6	10.2	10.5	10.4	8.3	9.7	8.2	8.9	94.7	475.7 PR
2	Marina Klimchenko	Russia	378	8.3	9.3	9.2	9.4	8.3	10.3	7.0	10.0	9.3	10.5	91.6	469.6
3	Sareh Javanmardi	Iran	376	9.6	9.8	10.9	10.1	7.7	8.0	8.6	9.7	9.6	9.0	93.0	469.0
4	Olga Mustafaieva	Ukraine	368	10.4	10.8	10.4	10.0	9.8	10.7	8.6	9.8	10.6	9.5	100.6	468.6
5	Myungsoon Park	South Korea	369	9.9	9.7	10.4	9.4	9.7	10.4	10.3	10.6	9.6	9.6	99.6	468.6
6	Alieh Mahmoudi	Iran	374	8.7	8.2	8.7	9.2	9.9	9.8	9.0	9.8	9.2	10.6	93.1	467.1
7	Yelena Taranova	Azerbaijan	372	9.6	10.5	9.5	8.5	10.1	10.0	7.3	9.9	9.3	9.2	93.9	465.9
8	Natalia Dalekova	Russia	367	10.6	10.3	9.7	9.1	10.2	9.7	7.4	10.4	10.1	8.9	96.4	463.4
