= 2014 IPC Shooting World Championships =

Competitive shooting tournament for people with disabilities

- Venue: Schießsportzentrum
- Location: Suhl, Germany
- Dates: 18 – 26 July 2014
- Competitors: 265 from 53 nations

The 2014 IPC Shooting World Championships was an international shooting competition for athletes with a disability. It consisted of twelve events and was held at the Schießsportzentrum in Suhl, Germany from 18 to 26 July. The Championships were contested by 265 competitors from 53 nations, with South Korea finishing top of the medal table with most gold medals (10) and medals won (17). During the qualification and finals, nine world records were equaled or broken and multiple regional records were set.

The 2014 Championship was a qualifying event for the 2016 Summer Paralympics in Rio, Brazil. It was the first individual sport to assign competitors to the 2016 Games with 28 countries winning a total of 63 spots. South Korea were the most successful nation, claiming 11 places while China, Norway, Russia and Ukraine took four a-piece.

This proved to be the final event branded as the "IPC Shooting World Championships". On 30 November 2016, the IPC, which serves as the international federation for 10 disability sports, including shooting, adopted the "World Para" brand for all 10 sports. The world championship events in all of these sports were immediately rebranded as "World Para" championships. At the same time, the IPC changed the official name of the sport to "shooting Para sport". Accordingly, future IPC shooting championships are known as "World Shooting Para Sport Championships".

== Classification ==
Paralympic shooters were classified according to the extent of their disability. The classification system allowed shooters to compete against others with a similar level of function.

Shooting classifications are:

- SH1 - competitors who do not need a shooting stand
- SH2 - competitors who use a shooting stand to support the firearm's weight

== World records ==
At the championships eight new world records were set and one was equaled.

| Event | Competitor | Nationality | Old record | New record | Phase | Date |
|---|---|---|---|---|---|---|
| Men's 10m Air Rifle Standing SH1 | Park Jinho | South Korea | 623.1 | 626.8 | Qual | 19 July |
| Team Men's 10m Air Rifle Standing SH1 | Park Jinho; Jeon Jinhwa; Lee Seugchul | South Korea | 1838.9 | 1864.5 | Qual | 19 July |
| Team Women's 10m Air Rifle Standing SH1 | Mandy Pankhurst; Deanna Coates; Karen Butler | Great Britain | 1173.0 | 1215.9 | Qual | 19 July |
| Mixed 10m Air Rifle Prone SH1 | Park Jinho | South Korea | 211.9 | 211.9 | Final | 21 July |
| Team Mixed 10m Air Rifle Standing SH2 | Kim Geunsoo; Jeon Youngjun; Kang Juyong | South Korea | 1883 | 1894.7 | Qual | 21 July |
| Mixed 10m Air Rifle Standing SH2 | Jeon Youngjun | South Korea | 210.6 | 210.7 | Final | 21 July |
| Mixed 50m Rifle Prone SH1 | Matt Skelhon | Great Britain | 206.9 | 209.5 | Final | 22 July |
| Men's 50m Rifle 3 Positions SH1 | Abdulla Sultan Alaryani | United Arab Emirates | 1172 | 1175 | Qual. | 25 July |
| Team Men's 50m Rifle 3 Positions SH1 | Park Jinho; Jeon Jinhwa; Sim Jae Yong | South Korea | 3417 | 3460 | Qual. | 25 July |

== Medal summary ==
=== Medal table ===
This ranking sorts countries by the number of gold medals earned by their shooters (in this context a nation is an entity represented by a National Paralympic Committee). The number of silver medals is taken into consideration next and then the number of bronze medals. If, after the above, countries are still tied, equal ranking is given and they are listed alphabetically.

* Host nation (Germany)

| Rank | Nation | Gold | Silver | Bronze | Total |
|---|---|---|---|---|---|
| 1 | South Korea (KOR) | 10 | 3 | 4 | 17 |
| 2 | Sweden (SWE) | 5 | 2 | 2 | 9 |
| 3 | Russia (RUS) | 2 | 5 | 2 | 9 |
| 4 | Great Britain (GBR) | 2 | 2 | 4 | 8 |
| 5 | Iran (IRI) | 2 | 1 | 0 | 3 |
| 6 | China (CHN) | 2 | 0 | 2 | 4 |
| 6 | Ukraine (UKR) | 2 | 0 | 2 | 4 |
| 8 | Turkey (TUR) | 1 | 1 | 2 | 4 |
| 9 | Slovenia (SLO) | 1 | 1 | 1 | 3 |
| 10 | Slovakia (SVK) | 1 | 1 | 0 | 2 |
| 11 | Finland (FIN) | 1 | 0 | 0 | 1 |
| 12 | Germany (GER)* | 0 | 6 | 2 | 8 |
| 13 | United Arab Emirates (UAE) | 0 | 2 | 2 | 4 |
| 14 | Serbia (SRB) | 0 | 2 | 0 | 2 |
| 15 | Azerbaijan (AZE) | 0 | 1 | 1 | 2 |
| 16 | Hungary (HUN) | 0 | 1 | 0 | 1 |
| 16 | Poland (POL) | 0 | 1 | 0 | 1 |
| 18 | Croatia (CRO) | 0 | 0 | 1 | 1 |
| 18 | France (FRA) | 0 | 0 | 1 | 1 |
| 18 | Israel (ISR) | 0 | 0 | 1 | 1 |
| 18 | Macedonia | 0 | 0 | 1 | 1 |
| 18 | New Zealand (NZL) | 0 | 0 | 1 | 1 |
| Totals (22 entries) | | 29 | 29 | 29 | 87 |

== Medalists ==
=== Pistol ===
==== Men's ====
| Pos | Individual | | | Team | |
|---|---|---|---|---|---|
P1 Men's 10 m Air Pistol SH1
| Gold | Lee Heejung | South Korea | 193.4 | South Korea | 1677 |
| Silver | Sergey Malyshev | Russia | 192.9 | Azerbaijan | 1665 |
| Bronze | Cevat Karagol | Turkey | 172.6 | Turkey | 1660 |

==== Women's ====
| Pos | Individual | | | Team | |
|---|---|---|---|---|---|
P2 Women's 10 m Air Pistol SH1
| Gold | Sareh Javanmardidodmani | Iran | 195.6 | Ukraine | 1089 |
| Silver | Krisztina Dávid | Hungary | 192.0 | Iran | 1081 |
| Bronze | Olivera Nakovska-Bikova | Macedonia | 164.5 | Russia | 1071 |

==== Mixed ====
| Pos | Individual | | | Team | |
|---|---|---|---|---|---|
P3 Mixed 25 metre pistol SH1
| Gold | Joackim Norberg | Sweden | 577 | Russia | 1689 |
| Silver | Sergey Malyshev | Russia | 576 | South Korea | 1663 |
| Bronze | Ni Hedong | China | 576 | Sweden | 1653 |
P4 Mixed 50 metre pistol SH1
| Gold | Cevat Karagol | Turkey | 181.4 | South Korea | 1576 |
| Silver | Valeriy Ponomarenko | Russia | 179.4 | Russia | 1540 |
| Bronze | Lee Juhee | South Korea | 159.2 | Azerbaijan | 1532 |
P5 Mixed 10 metre air pistol SH1
| Gold | Joackim Norberg | Sweden | 364 | | |
| Silver | Frank Heitmeyer | Germany | 353 | | |
| Bronze | Andrey Lebedinskiy | Russia | 353 | | |
FTP Mixed Falling Targets SH1
| Gold | Mahdi Zamanishurabi | Iran | 5 | | |
| Silver | Frank Heitmeyer | Germany | 4 | | |
| Bronze | Andrey Lebedinskiy | Russia | 3 | | |

=== Rifle ===
==== Men's ====
| Pos | Individual | | | Team | |
|---|---|---|---|---|---|
R1 Men's 10 metre air rifle SH1
| Gold | Janos Jakobsson | Sweden | 204.2 | South Korea | 1864.5 WR |
| Silver | Lee Seungchul | South Korea | 203.8 | Sweden | 1842.9 |
| Bronze | Andrii Doroshenko | Ukraine | 182.7 | Germany | 1842.2 |
R7 Men's 50 metre rifle three positions SH1
| Gold | Janos Jakobsson | Sweden | 454.6 | South Korea | 3460 WR |
| Silver | Abdulla Sultan Alaryani | United Arab Emirates | 452.8 | United Arab Emirates | 3457 |
| Bronze | Park Jinho | South Korea | 440.6 | Sweden | 3393 |

==== Women's ====
| Pos | Individual | | | Team | |
|---|---|---|---|---|---|
R2 Women's 10 metre air rifle SH1
| Gold | Veronika Vadovicova | Slovakia | 202.7 | United Kingdom | 1215.9 WR |
| Silver | Çağla Baş | Turkey | 201.6 | Germany | 1210.3 |
| Bronze | Lee Yunri | South Korea | 180.8 | China | 1209.6 |
R8 Women's 50 metre rifle three positions SH1
| Gold | Zhang Cuiping | China | 445.2 | China | 1678 |
| Silver | Veronika Vadovicova | Slovakia | 441.0 | Germany | 1647 |
| Bronze | Lee Yunri | South Korea | 431.3 | United Kingdom | 1631 |

==== Mixed ====
| Pos | Individual | | | Team | |
|---|---|---|---|---|---|
R3 Mixed 10 metre air rifle prone SH1
| Gold | Jinho Park | South Korea | 211.9 | South Korea | 1892.7 |
| Silver | Matt Skelhon | Great Britain | 211.3 | Russia | 1888.5 |
| Bronze | Abdulla Sultan Alaryani | United Arab Emirates | 189.1 | Germany | 1888.3 |
R4 Mixed 10 metre air rifle standing SH2
| Gold | Jeon Youngjun | South Korea | 210.7 | South Korea | 1894.7 WR |
| Silver | Kang Juyoung | South Korea | 209.9 | Slovenia | 1890.4 |
| Bronze | Tanguy de la Forest | France | 188.3 | Great Britain | 1883.2 |
R5 Mixed 10 metre air rifle prone SH2
| Gold | Minna Sinikka Leinonen | Finland | 212.0 | South Korea | 1900.5 |
| Silver | Dragan Ristic | Serbia | 211.9 | Serbia | 1899.4 |
| Bronze | Michael Johnson | New Zealand | 189.9 | Great Britain | 1899.2 |
R6 Mixed 50 metre rifle prone SH1
| Gold | Matt Skelhon | Great Britain | 209.5 | Russia | 1838.8 |
| Silver | Jonas Jakobsson | Sweden | 205.9 | Germany | 1828.7 |
| Bronze | Doron Shaziri | Israel | 184.5 | United Arab Emirates | 1828.0 |
R9 Mixed 50 metre rifle prone SH2
| Gold | Vasyl Kovalchuk | Ukraine | 621.0 | | |
| Silver | James Bevis | Great Britain | 615.2 | | |
| Bronze | Ivica Bratanovic | Croatia | 613.5 | | |
FTR1 Mixed Falling Target rifle SH1
| Gold | Martin Hall | Sweden | 6 | | |
| Silver | Kevin Zimmerman | Germany | 4 | | |
| Bronze | Karen Butler | Great Britain | 3 | | |
FTR2 Mixed Falling Target rifle SH2
| Gold | Veselka Pevec | Slovenia | 9 | | |
| Silver | Kazimierz Bysiek | Poland | 8 | | |
| Bronze | Gorazd Francek Tirsek | Slovenia | 7 | | |

== Participating nations ==
Below is the list of countries who took part in the 2014 Shooting World Championships and in brackets behind are the number of competitors each country sent.

- Argentina (1)
- Australia (20)
- Austria (15)
- Azerbaijan (13)
- Brazil (31)
- Bulgaria (2)
- Canada (5)
- China (26)
- Chinese Taipei (9)
- Croatia (14)
- Cyprus (1)
- Czech Republic (2)
- Denmark (10)
- Estonia (1)
- Finland (6)
- France (16)
- Germany (47)
- Greece (11)
- Great Britain (34)
- Hong Kong (3)
- Hungary (8)
- India (6)
- Iran (11)
- Ireland (5)
- Israel (2)
- Italy (25)
- Japan (5)
- Kenya (2)
- Kuwait (2)
- Lithuania (1)
- Mongolia (5)
- North Macedonia (12)
- Netherlands (2)
- New Zealand (7)
- Norway (19)
- Poland (22)
- Portugal (2)
- Russia (37)
- San Marino (1)
- Serbia (29)
- Slovakia (20)
- Slovenia (14)
- South Africa (2)
- South Korea (40)
- Spain (4)
- Sweden (30)
- Switzerland (3)
- Turkey (31)
- Ukraine (43)
- United Arab Emirates (15)
- United States (24)
- Uruguay (1)
- Uzbekistan (1)
