= 2008 Summer Paralympics national flag bearers =

During the Parade of Nations at the opening ceremony of the 2008 Summer Paralympic Games, athletes from each participating country paraded in the stadium, preceded by their flag. The flag was borne by a sportsperson from that country chosen either by the National Paralympic Committee or by the athletes themselves to represent their country. It is considered a great honour to bear the country's flag in the Parade of Nations.

== Parade order ==
Per tradition, the host country, in this case the People's Republic of China, marched last however contrary to tradition in the Olympic Games the national team of Greece did not enter first. All other nations marched in name order in the language of the host nation, which in this case is the Chinese language. As Chinese is written in characters and not letters, the order of the teams' entry was determined by the number of strokes in the first character of their respective countries' Simplified Chinese names. Countries with the same number of strokes in the first character are sorted by those of the next character. This made Guinea (几内亚) the first country to enter, as it takes two strokes to write the first character in the country's name (几), and Zambia (赞比亚) last-but-one, ahead of China.

== List ==
The following is a list of each country's flag bearer.

Order	Nation	Chinese name	Pinyin	Flag bearer	Sport
1	Guinea (GUI)	几内亚	Jīnèiyà	Ahmed Barry	Athletics
2	Turkey (TUR)	土耳其	Tǔěrqí	Korhan Yamac	Shooting
3	Turkmenistan (TKM)	土库曼斯坦	Tǔkùmànsītǎn	Ovezgeldy Ordjiyev	Powerlifting
4	Malta (MLT)	马耳他	Mǎěrtā	Atonio Flores	Athletics
5	Madagascar (MAD)	马达加斯加	Mǎdájiāsījiā	Josefa Harijaona Randrianony	Swimming
6	Malaysia (MAS)	马来西亚	Mǎláixīyà	Mariappan Perumal	Powerlifting
7	Mali (MLI)	马里	Mǎlǐ	Sissoko Facourou	Powerlifting
8	Macedonia (MKD)	前南斯拉夫马其顿共和国	Qián Nánsīlāfū Mǎqídùn Gònghéguó	Vanco Karanfilov	Shooting
9	Ecuador (ECU)	厄瓜多尔	Èguāduōěr	Jose Marino	Powerlifting
10	Jamaica (JAM)	牙买加	Yámǎijiā	Tanto Campbell	Athletics
11	Belgium (BEL)	比利时	Bǐlìshí	Nico Vergeylen	Table tennis
12	Vanuatu (VAN)	瓦努阿图	Wǎnǔātú	Tom Tete	Powerlifting
13	Israel (ISR)	以色列	Yǐsèliè	Yizhar Cohen	Swimming
14	Japan (JPN)	日本	Rìběn	Toru Suzuki	Athletics
15	Chinese Taipei (TPE)	中华台北	Zhōnghuá Táiběi	Hou Ting-Sung	Table tennis
16	Central African Republic (CAF)	中非	Zhōngfēi	Rosel-Clemariot-Christian Nikona	Athletics
17	Hong Kong (HKG)	中国香港	Zhōngguó Xiānggǎng	So Wa Wai	Athletics
18	Macau (MAC)	中国澳门	Zhōngguó Àomén	Kuong Sio Ieng	Athletics
19	Benin (BEN)	贝宁	Bèiníng	Blandine Sahenou	Powerlifting
20	Mauritius (MRI)	毛里求斯	Máolǐqiúsī	Richard Souci	Athletics
21	Denmark (DEN)	丹麦	Dānmài	Jackie Christiansen	Athletics
22	Uganda (UGA)	乌干达	Wūgāndá	Billy Ssengendo	Powerlifting
23	Ukraine (UKR)	乌克兰	Wūkèlán	Andrii Komar	Wheelchair fencing
24	Uruguay (URU)	乌拉圭	Wūlāguī	Henry Borges	Judo
25	Uzbekistan (UZB)	乌兹别克斯坦	Wūzībiékèsītǎn	Ravil Diganshin	Athletics / Powerlifting
26	Barbados (BAR)	巴巴多斯	Bābāduōsī	David Taylor	Swimming
27	Papua New Guinea (PNG)	巴布亚新几内亚	Bābùyà Xīn Jǐnèiyà	Francis Kompaon	Athletics
28	Brazil (BRA)	巴西	Bāxī	Antonio Tenorio Silva	Judo
29	Bahrain (BRN)	巴林	Bālín	Ahmed Meshaimaa	Athletics
30	Panama (PAN)	巴拿马	Bānámǎ	Said Gomez	Athletics
31	Pakistan (PAK)	巴基斯坦	Bājīsītǎn	Haider Ali	Athletics
32	Palestine (PLE)	巴勒斯坦	Bālèsītǎn	Husam Azzam	Athletics
33	Cuba (CUB)	古巴	Gǔbā	Yunidis Castillo	Athletics
34	Burkina Faso (BUR)	布基纳法索	Bùjīnà Fǎsuǒ	Lassane Gasbeogo	Cycling
35	Burundi (BDI)	布隆迪	Bùlóngdí	Remy Nikobimeze	Athletics
36	Timor-Leste (TLS)	东帝汶	Dōngdìwèn	Liliana da Costa Silva	Powerlifting
37	Qatar (QAT)	卡塔尔	Kǎtǎěr	Ali Abdulla Mohamed	Powerlifting
38	Rwanda (RWA)	卢旺达	Lúwàngdá	Jean de Dieu Nkundabera	Athletics
39	Luxembourg (LUX)	卢森堡	Lúsēnbǎo	Peter Lorkowski	Cycling
40	Belarus (BLR)	白俄罗斯	Báiéluósī	Ihar Fartunau	Athletics
41	India (IND)	印度	Yìndù	Rajinder Singh Rahelu	Powerlifting
42	Indonesia (INA)	印度尼西亚	Yìndùníxīyà	Billy Zeth Makal	Powerlifting
43	Lithuania (LTU)	立陶宛	Lìtáowǎn	Rolandas Urbonas	Athletics
44	Niger (NIG)	尼日尔	Nírìěr	Zakari Amadou	Powerlifting
45	Nigeria (NGR)	尼日利亚	Nírìlìyà	Adekunle Adesoji	Athletics
46	Nepal (NEP)	尼泊尔	Níbóěr	Jit Bahadur Khadka	Athletics
47	Ghana (GHA)	加纳	Jiānà	Nkegbe Botsyo	Athletics
48	Canada (CAN)	加拿大	Jiānádà	Donovan Tildesley	Swimming
49	Gabon (GAB)	加蓬	Jiāpéng	Thierry Mabicka	Athletics
50	Kyrgyzstan (KGZ)	吉尔吉斯斯坦	Jíěrjísīsītǎn	Roman Omurbekov	Powerlifting
51	Laos (LAO)	老挝	Lǎowō	Eay Simay	Powerlifting
52	Armenia (ARM)	亚美尼亚	Yàměiníyà	Greta Khndzrtsyan	Powerlifting
53	Spain (ESP)	西班牙	Xībānyá	David Casinos	Athletics
54	Bermuda (BER)	百慕大	Bǎimùdà	Jennifer Southern	Secretary General
55	Iraq (IRQ)	伊拉克	Yīlākè	Faris Al-Ajeeli	Powerlifting
56	Iran (IRI)	伊朗	Yīlǎng	Mohammad Reza Mirzaei	Athletics
57	Guatemala (GUA)	危地马拉	Wēidìmǎlā	Cesar Arturo Lopez Ivajera	Athletics
58	Hungary (HUN)	匈牙利	Xiōngyálì	Judit Horvathne Palfi	Wheelchair fencing
59	Dominican Republic (DOM)	多米尼加共和国	Duōmǐníjiā Gònghéguó	Alfonso Olibero Encarnacion	Athletics
60	Iceland (ISL)	冰岛	Bīngdǎo	Jon Oddur Haldorsson	Athletics
61	Angola (ANG)	安哥拉	Āngēlā	Jose Armando	Athletics
62	Tonga (TGA)	汤加	Tāngjiā	Mounga Okusitino	Athletics
63	Jordan (JOR)	约旦	Yuēdàn	Jamil Elshebli	Athletics
64	Finland (FIN)	芬兰	Fēnlán	Minna Leinonen	Shooting
65	Croatia (CRO)	克罗地亚	Kèluódìyà	Marija Ivekovic	Athletics
66	Suriname (SUR)	苏里南	Sūlǐnán	Biondi Misasi	Athletics
67	Libya (LBA)	利比亚	Lìbǐyǎ	Sahar Mostafa M El Gnemi	Powerlifting
68	Cape Verde (CPV)	佛得角	Fódéjiǎo	Artimeza Helena Sequiera	Athletics
69	Greece (GRE)	希腊	Xīlà	Charalampos Taiganidis	Swimming
70	Saudi Arabia (KSA)	沙特	Shātè	Osamah Alshanqiti	Athletics
71	Algeria (ALG)	阿尔及利亚	Āěrjílìyà	Mohamed Allek	Athletics
72	United Arab Emirates (UAE)	阿联酋	Āliánqiú	Abdullah al Aryani	Shooting
73	Argentina (ARG)	阿根廷	Āgēntíng	Silvio Velo	Football 5-A-Side
74	Oman (OMA)	阿曼	Āmàn	Badar al-Harthi	Powerlifting
75	Afghanistan (AFG)	阿富汗	Āfùhàn	Mohammad Fahim Rahimi	Powerlifting
76	Azerbaijan (AZE)	阿塞拜疆	Āsāibàijiān	Ilham Zakiyev	Judo
77	Namibia (NAM)	纳米比亚	Nàmǐbǐyà	Reginald Benade	Athletics
78	Tanzania (TAN)	坦桑尼亚	Tǎnsāngníyà	Ernest Nyabalale	Athletics
79	Latvia (LAT)	拉脱维亚	Lātuōwéiyà	Edgars Bergs	Athletics
80	Great Britain (GBR)	英国	Yīngguó	Danny Crates	Athletics
81	Kenya (KEN)	肯尼亚	Kěnníyà	Henry Wanyioke	Athletics
82	Romania (ROU)	罗马尼亚	Luōmǎníyà	Eduard Novak	Cycling
83	Venezuela (VEN)	委内瑞拉	Wěinèiruìlā	Reinaldo Carvallo	Judo
84	France (FRA)	法国	Fǎguó	Assia El Hannouni	Athletics
85	Faroe Islands (FRO)	法罗群岛	Fǎluó Qúndǎo	Heidi Andreasen	Swimming
86	Poland (POL)	波兰	Bōlán	Krzysztof Smorszczewski	Athletics
87	Puerto Rico (PUR)	波多黎各	Bōduō Lígè	Nilda Gomez Lopez	Shooting
88	Bosnia and Herzegovina (BIH)	波黑	Bōhēi	Sabahudin Delalić	Sitting volleyball
89	Bangladesh (BAN)	孟加拉国	Mèngjiālāguó	Abdul Quader Sumon	Athletics
90	Norway (NOR)	挪威	Nuówēi	Cecilie Drabsch-Norland	Swimming
91	South Africa (RSA)	南非	Nánfēi	Natalie du Toit	Swimming
92	Cambodia (CAM)	柬埔寨	Jiǎnpǔzhài	Vanna Kim	Athletics
93	Kazakhstan (KAZ)	哈萨克斯坦	Hāsàkèsītǎn	Liazat Salimzenova	Powerlifting
94	Kuwait (KUW)	科威特	Kēwēitè	Hamad Aladwani	Athletics
95	Ivory Coast (CIV)	科特迪瓦	Kētè Díwǎ	Oumar Basakoulba Kone	Athletics
96	Bulgaria (BUL)	保加利亚	Bǎojiālìyà	Stela Eneva	Athletics
97	Russia (RUS)	俄罗斯	Éluósī	Alexey Ashapatov	Athletics
98	Syria (SYR)	叙利亚	Xùlìyà	Rasha Alshikh	Powerlifting
99	United States (USA)	美国	Měiguó	Jennifer Armbruster	Goalball
100	Honduras (HON)	洪都拉斯	Hóngdūlāsī	Luis Carlos Hernandez Oliva	Athletics
101	Zimbabwe (ZIM)	津巴布韦	Jīnbābùwéi	Elliot Mujaji	Athletics
102	Tunisia (TUN)	突尼斯	Tūnísī	Ahmed Benhaj Ali	Athletics
103	Thailand (THA)	泰国	Tàiguó	Supachai Koysub	Athletics
104	Egypt (EGY)	埃及	Aījí	Metwaly Ibrahim Mathna	Powerlifting
105	Ethiopia (ETH)	埃塞俄比亚	Aīsāiébǐyà	Tesfalem Gebru	Athletics
106	Lesotho (LES)	莱索托	Láisuǒtuō	Thato Mohasoa	Athletics
107	Netherlands (NED)	荷兰	Hélán	Esther Vergeer	Wheelchair tennis
108	Georgia (GEO)	格鲁吉亚	Gélǔjíyà	Yago Gorgadze	Powerlifting
109	Colombia (COL)	哥伦比亚	Gēlúnbǐyà	Moisés Fuentes	Swimming
110	Costa Rica (CRC)	哥斯达黎加	Gēsīdá Líjiā	Giovanny Rodriguez	Table tennis
111	Peru (PER)	秘鲁	Bìlǔ	Jose Gonzales-Mugaburu	Swimming
112	Ireland (IRL)	爱尔兰	Aìěrlán	Patrice Dockery	Athletics
113	Estonia (EST)	爱沙尼亚	Aìshāníyà	Kristo Ringas	Swimming
114	Haiti (HAI)	海地	Hǎidì	Nephtalie Jean Louis	Powerlifting
115	Czech Republic (CZE)	捷克	Jiékè	Marketa Sidkova	Archery
116	Philippines (PHI)	菲律宾	Fēilǜbīn	Adeline Dumapong-Ancheta	Powerlifting
117	El Salvador (ESA)	萨尔瓦多	Sàěrwǎduō	Zulma Cruz	Athletics
118	Samoa (SAM)	萨摩亚	Sàmóyà	Mose Faatamala	Athletics
119	Tajikistan (TJK)	塔吉克斯坦	Tǎjíkèsītǎn	Khayrullo Abdurahimov	Powerlifting
120	Vietnam (VIE)	越南	Yuènán	Nguyen Quang Vuong	Swimming
121	Sri Lanka (SRI)	斯里兰卡	Sīlǐ Lánkǎ	Sandun Wasana Perera	Powerlifting
122	Slovenia (SLO)	斯洛文尼亚	Sīluòwénníyà	Franc Pinter	Shooting
123	Slovakia (SVK)	斯洛伐克	Sīluòfákè	Ladislav Gaspar	Table tennis
124	Portugal (POR)	葡萄牙	Pútáoyá	Filomena Franco	Rowing
125	South Korea (KOR)	韩国	Hánguó	Park Jong-Chul	Powerlifting
126	Fiji (FIJ)	斐济	Fěijì	Ranjesh Prakash	Athletics
127	Montenegro (MNE)	黑山	Hēishān	Dusan Dragovic	Swimming
128	Chile (CHI)	智利	Zhìlì	Robinson Mendez	Wheelchair tennis
129	Austria (AUT)	奥地利	Aòdìlì	Christoph Etzlstorfer	Athletics
130	Myanmar (MYA)	缅甸	Miǎndiàn	Myint Win	Athletics
131	Switzerland (SUI)	瑞士	Ruìshì	Heinz Frei	Athletics / Cycling
132	Sweden (SWE)	瑞典	Ruìdiǎn	Anders Olsson	Swimming
133	Mongolia (MGL)	蒙古	Měnggǔ	Bazarsuren Choyondorj	Judo
134	Singapore (SIN)	新加坡	Xīnjiāpō	Rui Si Theresa Goh	Swimming
135	New Zealand (NZL)	新西兰	Xīn Xīlán	Sholto Taylor	Wheelchair rugby
136	Italy (ITA)	意大利	Yìdàlì	Francesca Porcellato	Athletics
137	Senegal (SEN)	塞内加尔	Sàinèijiāěr	Nidiaye Mor	Athletics
138	Serbia (SRB)	塞尔维亚	Sàiěrwéiyà	Zlatko Kesler	Table tennis
139	Cyprus (CYP)	塞浦路斯	Sàipǔlùsī	Karolina Pelendritou	Swimming
140	Mexico (MEX)	墨西哥	Mòxīgē	Saul Mendoza	Athletics
141	Lebanon (LIB)	黎巴嫩	Líbānèn	Edward Maalouf	Cycling
142	Germany (GER)	德国	Déguó	Conny Dietz	Goalball
143	Moldova (MDA)	摩尔多瓦	Móěrduōwǎ	Larisa Marinenkova	Powerlifting
144	Morocco (MAR)	摩洛哥	Móluògē	Abdelilah Mame	Athletics
145	Australia (AUS)	澳大利亚	Àodàlìyǎ	Russell Short	Athletics
146	Zambia (ZAM)	赞比亚	Zànbǐyà	Lassam Katongo	Athletics
147	China (CHN)	中国	Zhōngguó	Wang Xiaofu	Swimming

== See also ==
- 2008 Summer Olympics national flag bearers

== Sources ==
- Official list on the website of the International Paralympic Committee
