= Shooting at the 2000 Summer Paralympics =

Shooting at the XI Paralympic Games
- Paralympic Shooting
- Venue: Sydney International Shooting Centre
- Dates: 19 to 24 October
- Competitors: 139 from 36 nations

Paralympic symbol (1994-2004)

Shooting at the 2000 Summer Paralympics consisted of twelve events spread over two main classes:

- Class SH 1 - Pistol and rifle competitors who don't require a shooting stand
- Class SH 2 - Rifle competitors who require a shooting stand due to disability in the upper limbs

== Medal table ==
Rank	Nation	Gold	Silver	Bronze	Total
1	South Korea (KOR)	5	0	1	6
2	Sweden (SWE)	4	0	2	6
3	China (CHN)	1	2	0	3
4	Great Britain (GBR)	1	0	1	2
4	Iran (IRI)	1	0	1	2
6	Germany (GER)	0	5	1	6
7	Australia (AUS)	0	1	0	1
7	Azerbaijan (AZE)	0	1	0	1
7	Finland (FIN)	0	1	0	1
7	Israel (ISR)	0	1	0	1
7	Slovenia (SLO)	0	1	0	1
12	France (FRA)	0	0	3	3
13	Austria (AUT)	0	0	1	1
13	Russia (RUS)	0	0	1	1
13	Spain (ESP)	0	0	1	1
Totals (15 entries)		12	12	12	36

=== Participating nations ===
- Australia (11)
- Austria (4)
- Azerbaijan (1)
- Belgium (3)
- Canada (4)
- China (4)
- Croatia (1)
- Denmark (4)
- Estonia (1)
- Finland (6)
- France (7)
- Germany (16)
- Great Britain (6)
- Hong Kong (1)
- India (1)
- Iran (6)
- Israel (3)
- Italy (5)
- Japan (4)
- Macedonia (2)
- Netherlands (1)
- New Zealand (1)
- Norway (1)
- Poland (1)
- Puerto Rico (1)
- Russia (5)
- Slovakia (2)
- Slovenia (3)
- South Africa (1)
- South Korea (12)
- Spain (5)
- Sweden (5)
- Switzerland (5)
- Thailand (2)
- United States (3)
- Yugoslavia (1)

== Medallists ==
Event	Gold	Silver	Bronze
Men's air pistol SH1	Hee Jeong Lee; South Korea	Jian Fei Li; China	Hubert Aufschnaiter; Austria
Men's air rifle standing SH1	Jin Owan Jung; South Korea	Franc Pinter; Slovenia	Jonas Jacobsson; Sweden
Men's free rifle 3×40 SH1	Jonas Jacobsson; Sweden	Josef Neumaier; Germany	Jin Owan Jung; South Korea
Women's air pistol SH1	Isabel Newstead; Great Britain	Hai Yan Lin; China	Nayyereh Akef; Iran
Women's air rifle standing SH1	Im Yeon Kim; South Korea	Sabine Brogle; Germany	Deanna Coates; Great Britain
Women's sport rifle 3×20 SH1	Im Yeon Kim; South Korea	Sabine Brogle; Germany	Nicole Michoux; France
Mixed air rifle prone SH1	Enayatollah Bokharaei; Iran	Erkki Pekkala; Finland	Jonas Jacobsson; Sweden
Mixed air rifle prone SH2	Thomas Johansson; Sweden	Wolfgang Stoeckl; Germany	Eric Lacaze; France
Mixed air rifle standing SH2	Thomas Johansson; Sweden	Christiane Latzke; Germany	Raphaël Voltz; France
Mixed free pistol SH1	Jong In Choi; South Korea	Yelena Taranova; Azerbaijan	Francisco Angel Soriano; Spain
Mixed free rifle prone SH1	Jonas Jacobsson; Sweden	Doron Shaziri; Israel	Alfred Beringer; Germany
Mixed sport pistol SH1	Wei Huang; China	Peter Tait; Australia	Andrey Lebedinsky; Russia
