= North Macedonia at the 2024 Summer Paralympics =

- Flag of North Macedonia
- IPC code: MKD
- NPC: Macedonian Paralympic Committee
- Website: www.fsrim.org.mk

in Paris, France August 28, 2024 – September 8, 2024
- Competitors: 1 in 1 sport
- Flag bearer: Volunteer
- Medals: Gold 0 Silver 0 Bronze 0 Total 0

Summer Paralympics appearances (overview)
- 1996; 2000; 2004; 2008; 2012; 2016; 2020; 2024

Other related appearances
- Yugoslavia (1972–2000)

North Macedonia competed at the 2024 Summer Paralympics in Paris, France, from 28 August to 8 September.

== Competitors ==
The following is the list of number of competitors in the Games.

Sport	Men	Women	Total
Shooting	0	1	1
Total	0	1	1

== Shooting ==
North Macedonia entered one para-shooter after achieved quota places for the following events by virtue of their best finishes at the 2022 World Championships, as long as they obtained a minimum qualifying score (MQS) by May 31, 2024.

Mixed

Athlete	Event	Qualification		Final	
Athlete	Event	Points	Rank	Points	Rank
Olivera Nakovska-Bikova	P4 – 50 m pistol SH1	526	17	did not advance	

== See also ==
- North Macedonia at the Paralympics
