= Turkey at the 2008 Summer Paralympics =

- IPC code: TUR
- NPC: Turkish Paralympic Committee
- Website: www.tmpk.org.tr (in Turkish)

in Beijing
- Competitors: 16 in 7 sports
- Flag bearer: Korhan Yamaç
- Medals Ranked 58th: Gold 1 Silver 0 Bronze 1 Total 2

Summer Paralympics appearances (overview)
- 1992; 1996; 2000; 2004; 2008; 2012; 2016; 2020; 2024

Turkey sent a delegation to compete at the 2008 Summer Paralympics in Beijing. The country represented by sixteen athletes, competing in shooting, archery, powerlifting, table tennis, wheelchair tennis, athletics and judo.

== Medalists ==
Medal	Name	Sport	Event
Gold	Gizem Girişmen	Archery	Women's individual recurve
Bronze	Neslihan Kavas	Table tennis	Women's single class 9

== Sports ==
=== Archery ===
==== Men ====
Athlete	Event	Ranking round		Round of 32	Round of 16	Quarterfinals	Semifinals	Finals	
Athlete	Event	Score	Seed	Opposition score	Opposition score	Opposition score	Opposition score	Opposition score	Rank
Mustafa Demir	Men's individual recurve W1/W2	600	14	Browne (GBR); L 90-104	did not advance				
Ozgur Ozen	Men's individual recurve W1/W2	591	16	Candela (ESP); W 96-87	Chopyk (UKR); W 107-100	Jung (KOR); W 103-102	Cheng C (CHN); L 98-112	Tseng L H (TPE); L 91-92	4

==== Women ====
Athlete	Event	Ranking round		Round of 32	Round of 16	Quarterfinals	Semifinals	Finals	
Athlete	Event	Score	Seed	Opposition score	Opposition score	Opposition score	Opposition score	Opposition score	Rank
Gülbin Su	Women's individual compound	650	3	—		Nilsson (SWE); W 112-102	Kamiya (JPN); L 104-106	Clarke (GBR); L 109-113	4
Gizem Girismen	Women's individual recurve W1/W2	590	4	Bye	Kuncova (CZE); W 103-85	Dzoba (UKR); W 99-83	Xiao Y (CHN); W 95-93	Fu (CHN); W 91-85	1st place, gold medalist(s)
Hanife Ozturk	Women's individual recurve W1/W2	503	14	Nakanishi (JPN); L 78-82	did not advance				

=== Athletics ===
==== Men's track ====
Athlete	Class	Event	Heats		Final	
Athlete	Class	Event	Result	Rank	Result	Rank
Kemal Ozdemir	T46	Marathon	—		3:11:12	13

=== Judo ===
Athlete	Event	First Round	Semifinals	Repechage	Final/ Bronze medal contest
Athlete	Event	Opposition Result	Opposition Result	Opposition Result	Opposition Result
Duygu Cete	Women's 57kg	Brussig (GER); L 0000–0010	—	Keramida (GRE); L 0010-1000	Did not advance

=== Powerlifting ===
==== Men ====
Athlete	Event	Result	Rank
Turan Mutlu	52kg	137.5	9
Levent Tutgun	100kg	185.0	9

==== Women ====
Athlete	Event	Result	Rank
Nazmiye Muslu	40kg	90.0	4

=== Shooting ===
Athlete	Event	Qualification		Final		
Athlete	Event	Score	Rank	Score	Total	Rank
Cevat Karagol	Men's 10m air pistol SH1	559	15	did not advance		
Cevat Karagol	Mixed 50m pistol SH1	522	10	did not advance		
Muharrem Korhan Yamac	Men's 10m air pistol SH1	563	8 Q	95.4	658.4	8
Muharrem Korhan Yamac	Mixed 25m pistol SH1	552	16	did not advance		
Muharrem Korhan Yamac	Mixed 50m pistol SH1	532	6 Q	90.7	622.7	7

==== Women ====
Athlete	Event	Qualification		Final		
Athlete	Event	Score	Rank	Score	Total	Rank
Aysel Ozgan	Women's 10m air pistol SH1	366	6 Q	90.2	456.2	7
Suzan Tekin	Women's 10m air rifle standing SH1	379	15	did not advance		

=== Table tennis ===
Athlete	Event	Preliminaries				Semifinals	Final / BM	
Athlete	Event	Opposition Result	Opposition Result	Opposition Result	Rank	Opposition Result	Opposition Result	Rank
Neslihan Kavas	Women's singles C9	Lei L (CHN); L 0–3	Maldonado (BRA); W 3–0	Belavic (SLO); W 3–0	2 Q	Liu M (CHN); L 1–3	Grzelak (POL); W 3-0	3rd place, bronze medalist(s)

=== Wheelchair tennis ===
Athlete	Event	Round of 64	Round of 32	Round of 16	Quarterfinals	Semifinals	Finals
Athlete	Event	Opposition Result	Opposition Result	Opposition Result	Opposition Result	Opposition Result	Opposition Result
Kemal Okur	Men's singles	Tenhunen (FIN); L 5–7, 3-6	did not advance				

== See also ==
- 2008 Summer Paralympics
- Turkey at the Paralympics
- Turkey at the 2008 Summer Olympics
