= North Macedonia at the 2020 Summer Paralympics =

- Flag of North Macedonia
- IPC code: MKD
- NPC: Macedonian Paralympic Committee
- Website: www.fsrim.org.mk
- Medals: Gold 0 Silver 0 Bronze 0 Total 0

Summer Paralympics appearances (overview)
- 1996; 2000; 2004; 2008; 2012; 2016; 2020; 2024

Other related appearances
- Yugoslavia (1972–2000)

North Macedonia competed at the 2020 Summer Paralympics in Tokyo, Japan, from 24 August to 5 September 2021. This was their seventh consecutive appearance at the Summer Paralympics since 1996.

== Shooting ==
North Macedonia entered one athletes into the Paralympic competition. Olivera Nakovska-Bikova successfully break the Paralympic qualification at the 2018 WSPS World Championships which was held in Cheongju, South Korea.

Athlete	Event	Qualification		Final	
Athlete	Event	Score	Rank	Score	Rank
Olivera Nakovska-Bikova	Mixed P3 – 25 m pistol SH1				

== See also ==
- North Macedonia at the Paralympics
- North Macedonia at the 2020 Summer Olympics
