= Macedonia at the 1996 Summer Paralympics =

- Flag of the Republic of Macedonia
- IPC code: MKD
- NPC: Macedonian Paralympic Committee
- Website: www.fsrim.org.mk

in Atlanta
- Competitors: 1
- Medals: Gold 0 Silver 0 Bronze 0 Total 0

Summer Paralympics appearances (overview)
- 1996; 2000; 2004; 2008; 2012; 2016; 2020; 2024

Other related appearances
- Yugoslavia (1972–2000)

One male athlete from Macedonia competed at the 1996 Summer Paralympics in Atlanta, United States.

== See also ==
- North Macedonia at the Paralympics
- Macedonia at the 1996 Summer Olympics
