= Macedonia at the 2016 Summer Paralympics =

- Flag of the Republic of Macedonia
- IPC code: MKD
- NPC: Macedonian Paralympic Committee
- Website: www.fsrim.org.mk

in Rio de Janeiro
- Competitors: 2 in 1 sports
- Medals: Gold 0 Silver 0 Bronze 0 Total 0

Summer Paralympics appearances (overview)
- 1996; 2000; 2004; 2008; 2012; 2016; 2020; 2024

Other related appearances
- Yugoslavia (1972–2000)

Macedonia competed at the 2016 Summer Paralympics in Rio de Janeiro, Brazil, from 7 to 18 September 2016.

== Disability classifications ==
Every participant at the Paralympics has their disability grouped into one of five disability categories; amputation, the condition may be congenital or sustained through injury or illness; cerebral palsy; wheelchair athletes, there is often overlap between this and other categories; visual impairment, including blindness; Les autres, any physical disability that does not fall strictly under one of the other categories, for example dwarfism or multiple sclerosis. Each Paralympic sport then has its own classifications, dependent upon the specific physical demands of competition. Events are given a code, made of numbers and letters, describing the type of event and classification of the athletes competing. Some sports, such as athletics, divide athletes by both the category and severity of their disabilities, other sports, for example swimming, group competitors from different categories together, the only separation being based on the severity of the disability.

== Shooting ==
The first opportunity to qualify for shooting at the Rio Games took place at the 2014 IPC Shooting World Championships in Suhl. Shooters earned spots for their NPC. Macedonia earned a qualifying spot at this event in the P2 – 10m Air Pistol Women SH1 event as a result of Olivera Nakovska-Bikova winning a bronze medal.

Athlete	Event	Qualification		Semifinal		Final	
Athlete	Event	Score	Rank	Score	Rank	Score	Rank
Vanco Karanfilov	Men's 10m air pistol SH1	556	16	—N/a		did not advance	
Vanco Karanfilov	Mixed 25 metre pistol SH1	542	24	did not advance			
Vanco Karanfilov	Mixed 50 metre pistol SH1	500	30	—N/a		did not advance	
Olivera Nakovska-Bikova	Women's 10m air pistol SH1	374	3 Q	—N/a		92.8	7
Olivera Nakovska-Bikova	Mixed 25 metre pistol SH1	558	14	did not advance			
Olivera Nakovska-Bikova	Mixed 50 metre pistol SH1	528	8 Q	—N/a		138.1	4

== See also ==
- Macedonia at the 2016 Summer Olympics
