= Olga Kovalchuk =

Ukrainian Paralympic sport shooter

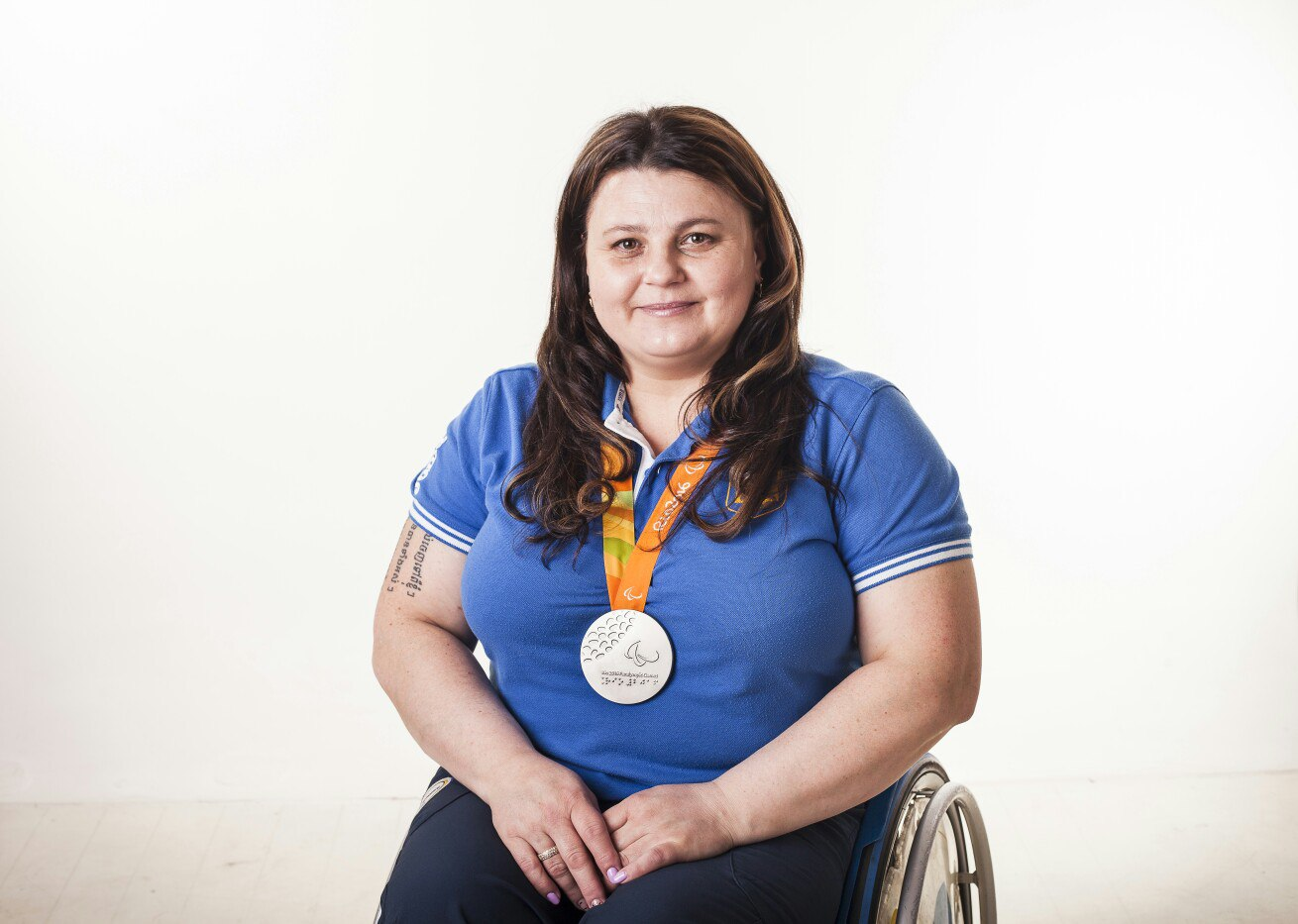
- Olga Kovalchuk

Sport
- Country: Ukraine
- Sport: Paralympic shooting
- Disability class: SH1
Medal record
Representing Ukraine
Paralympic Games
| Silver medal – second place | 2016 Rio de Janeiro | 10 m air pistol SH1 |

Olga Kovalchuk is a Ukrainian Paralympic sport shooter. She represented Ukraine at the 2012 Summer Paralympics and at the 2016 Summer Paralympics and she won the silver medal in the women's 10 metre air pistol SH1 event in 2016.
