= Michael Johnson (sport shooter) =

New Zealand Paralympic shooter

Michael Johnson MNZM
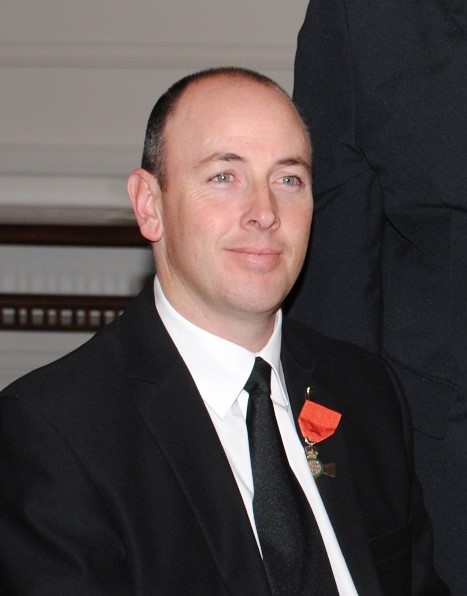
- Johnson in 2011

Personal information
- Born: 15 October 1973 (age 52) Auckland, New Zealand
Medal record
Men's shooting para sport
Representing New Zealand
Paralympic Games
Gold medal – first place	2004 Athens	Men's Mixed air rifle standing SH2
Bronze medal – third place	2008 Beijing	Men's Mixed 10 m air rifle standing SH2
Bronze medal – third place	2012 London	Men's Mixed 10 m air rifle standing SH2
World Championships
Gold medal – first place	2006 Sargans	Men's Mixed air rifle prone SH2
Gold medal – first place	2010 Zagreb	Men's Mixed 50m rifle prone SH2
Bronze medal – third place	2010 Zagreb	Men's Mixed air rifle standing SH2
Bronze medal – third place	2014 Suhl	Men's Mixed air rifle prone SH2
Silver medal – second place	2018 South Korea	Men's Mixed air rifle standing SH2

Michael Johnson MNZM (born 15 October 1973) is a New Zealand Paralympic shooter who won a gold medal at the 2004 Summer Paralympics.

== Career ==
Johnson started target shooting in 2002 and his first international competition was the 2002 Oceania championships, competing against other SH2 shooters, where he finished fourth. At the 2004 Summer Paralympics in the SH2 Standing Air event, Johnson shot a perfect 600 out of 600 points in the preliminaries and then equalled the world record for a gold medal in the finals with 704.3.

Johnson later became the first New Zealand world champion, when in July 2006 he won the gold medal in the SH2 Prone Air event at the IPC World Championships in Switzerland, shooting 600 out of 600 points In 2007, Johnson attended the Jikji Cup in South Korea, competing in and winning four events: the SH2 Standing, Prone, Falling Targets and 50m Small-bore. He was awarded the MVP award and the Jikji Cup. In 2008, Johnson competed in The Hessian Trophy; after shooting 600 out of 600 along with four other shooters, he shot a final score of 105.8 to win.

Later that year, Johnson represented his country in the 2008 Summer Paralympics in Beijing. Johnson secured a bronze medal in the Mixed R4-10 m air rifle standing SH2 with a score of 701.2 after a shoot-off with South Korean shooter Ho-Gyoung You.

2009 started well with Johnson building towards London 2012 competing again at the Jikji Cup (now called The Open Asian Shooting Championships) in South Korea. Johnson won three medals: gold in the R9 50m event; silver in the R4 10m Air rifle standing; and bronze in the R5 10m Air rifle prone.

At the 2010 world championships in Zagreb, Croatia, Johnson won the bronze medal in the air rifle standing event after shooting a perfect 600 / 600 points. He went on to win the gold medal in the R9 50m prone .22 event, setting a new world record with 593 points.

At the World Championships in Suhl, Germany, Johnson won the bronze medal in the R5 mixed 10m air rifle prone.

In 2018, Johnson won the silver medal in the R4 mixed 10m air rifle standing at the World Championships in Cheongju, South Korea.

== Honours ==
In the 2011 Queen's Birthday Honours, Johnson was appointed a Member of the New Zealand Order of Merit, for services to Paralympic sport.
