= Doron Shaziri =

Israeli Paralympic shooter

Personal information
- Native name: דורון שזירי
- Born: 21 February 1967 (age 59)

Sport
- Country: Israel
- Sport: Paralympic shooting
- Disability class: SH1
- Coached by: Guy Starik
Medal record
Men's shooting para sport
Representing Israel
Paralympic Games
Silver medal – second place	1996 Atlanta	Mixed English
Silver medal – second place	1996 Atlanta	Free 3X40
Silver medal – second place	2000 Sydney	Mixed Prone
Silver medal – second place	2008 Beijing	Free 3X40
Silver medal – second place	2012 London	3 positions
Bronze medal – third place	2004 Athens	Free Prone
Bronze medal – third place	2004 Athens	Free 3X40
Bronze medal – third place	2016 Rio	3 positions
World Para Championships
Gold medal – first place	2006 Sargans	R6 Mixed 50m Rifle Prone
Silver medal – second place	2006 Sargans	R7 Men's 50m Rifle 3 Positions
Bronze medal – third place	2010 Zagreb	R7 Men's 50m Rifle 3 Positions
Bronze medal – third place	2014 Suhl	R6 Mixed 50m Rifle Prone

Doron Shaziri (Hebrew: דורון שזירי; born 21 February 1967) is an Israeli Paralympic shooter.

== Early life ==
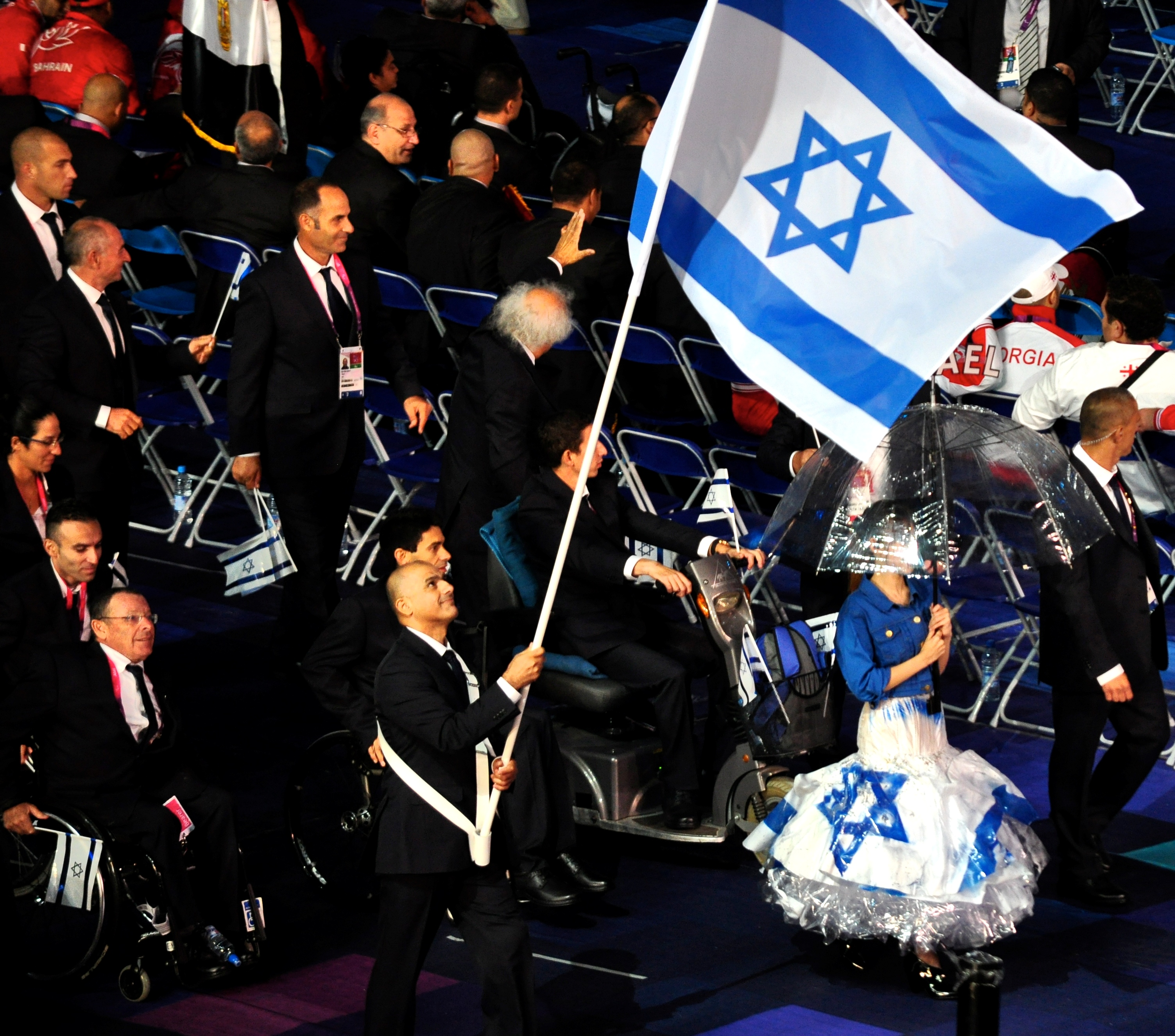
2012 Paralympics Opening Ceremony

In 1987, Shaziri was working as an Israel Defense Forces recruit while patrolling the Israeli-Lebanon border, when he tried to rescue his comrades but was hit by a mine. After the incident, he was taken to a military hospital where he was given a prosthetic leg. In 1994, he realized that he was a good engineer, and established his own business in which he was constructed wheelchairs for injured vets.

== Shooting career ==
Shaziri was selected to be a flag bearer at the 2012 Paralympics opening ceremony; he also won a silver medal at these games. Prior to the London Paralympics, he also won silver and bronze medals in such competitions as the 1996 Atlanta, 2000 Sydney, 2004 Athens, and 2008 Beijing Paralympic Games.
