= Macedonia at the 2008 Summer Paralympics =

- Flag of the Republic of Macedonia
- IPC code: MKD
- NPC: Macedonian Paralympic Committee
- Website: www.fsrim.org.mk

in Beijing
- Competitors: 2 in 1 sport
- Medals: Gold 0 Silver 0 Bronze 0 Total 0

Summer Paralympics appearances (overview)
- 1996; 2000; 2004; 2008; 2012; 2016; 2020; 2024

Other related appearances
- Yugoslavia (1972–2000)

Macedonia competed at the 2008 Summer Paralympics in Beijing, China.

== Shooting ==
Athlete	Event	Qualification		Final		
Athlete	Event	Score	Rank	Score	Total	Rank
Vanco Karanfilov	Men's 10m air pistol SH1	549	27	did not advance		
Vanco Karanfilov	Mixed 25m pistol SH1	554	13	did not advance		
Vanco Karanfilov	Mixed 50m pistol SH1	508	22	did not advance		
Olivera Nakovska-Bikova	Women's 10m air pistol SH1	368	4 Q	94.1	462.1	5
Olivera Nakovska-Bikova	Mixed 25m pistol SH1	553	15	did not advance		
Olivera Nakovska-Bikova	Mixed 50m pistol SH1	518	15	did not advance		

== See also ==
- North Macedonia at the Paralympics
- Macedonia at the 2008 Summer Olympics
