= Serbia at the 2008 Summer Paralympics =

- IPC code: SRB
- NPC: Paralympic Committee of Serbia
- Website: www.paralympic.rs

in Beijing
- Competitors: 14 in 3 sports
- Flag bearer: Zlatko Kesler
- Medals Ranked 56th: Gold 0 Silver 2 Bronze 0 Total 2

Summer Paralympics appearances (overview)
- 2008; 2012; 2016; 2020; 2024

Other related appearances
- Yugoslavia (1972–2000); Independent Paralympic Participants (1992); Serbia and Montenegro (2004)

Serbia competed at the 2008 Summer Paralympics in Beijing for the first time as independent country. Serbian competitors took part in table tennis and athletics events. They won 2 silver medals, Borislava Perić in table tennis event and Draženko Mitrović in athletics.

== Medalists ==
Medal	Name	Sport	Event
Silver	Draženko Mitrović	Athletics	Men's discus throw - F53/54
Silver	Borislava Perić	Table Tennis	Women's single class 4

== Sports ==
=== Athletics ===
==== Men's track ====
Athlete	Class	Event	Heats		Semifinal		Final	
Athlete	Class	Event	Result	Rank	Result	Rank	Result	Rank
Željko Čeliković	T46	Marathon	—N/a				2:56:53	12
Nemanja Savković	T12	100m	11.53	15	did not advance			
Nemanja Savković	T12	200m	23.37	13	did not advance			

==== Men's field ====
Athlete	Class	Event	Final		
Athlete	Class	Event	Result	Points	Rank
Jovica Brkić	F53-54	Discus throw	24.57	893	8
Milos Grlica	F11-12	Javelin throw	49.19	869	8
Draženko Mitrović	F53-54	Discus throw	29.09	1058	2nd place, silver medalist(s)
Draženko Mitrović	F53-54	Javelin throw	27.42	1040	4

==== Women's track ====
Athlete	Class	Event	Heats		Semifinal		Final	
Athlete	Class	Event	Result	Rank	Result	Rank	Result	Rank
Tanja Dragić	T12	100m	13.80	13	did not advance			
Tanja Dragić	T12	200m	DNF		did not advance			

==== Women's field ====
Athlete	Class	Event	Final		
Athlete	Class	Event	Result	Points	Rank
Tanja Dragić	F12	Long jump	5.07	-	9

=== Shooting ===
==== Men ====
Athlete	Event	Qualification		Final		
Athlete	Event	Score	Rank	Score	Total	Rank
Aleksandar Janda	Men's 10m air pistol SH1	541	31	did not advance		
Aleksandar Janda	Mixed 50m pistol SH1	495	28	did not advance		
Zivko Papaz	Men's 10m air pistol SH1	538	33	did not advance		
Zivko Papaz	Mixed 25m pistol SH1	549	21	did not advance		
Zivko Papaz	Mixed 50m pistol SH1	499	28	did not advance		

==== Women ====
Athlete	Event	Qualification		Final		
Athlete	Event	Score	Rank	Score	Total	Rank
Snežana Nikolić	Women's 10m air rifle standing SH1	384	12	did not advance		
Snežana Nikolić	Women's 50m rifle 3 positions SH1	542	15	did not advance		
Snežana Nikolić	Mixed 10m air rifle prone SH1	594	31	did not advance		
Sinisa Vidic	Mixed 10m air rifle prone SH2	593	20	did not advance		
Sinisa Vidic	Mixed 10m air rifle standing SH2	589	18	did not advance		

=== Table tennis ===
==== Men ====
Athlete	Event	Preliminaries			Round of 16	Quarterfinals	Semifinals	Final / BM	
Athlete	Event	Opposition Result	Opposition Result	Rank	Opposition Result	Opposition Result	Opposition Result	Opposition Result	Rank
Ilija Đurašinović	Men's singles C4-5	Urhaug (NOR); L 0–3	Starl (AUT); L 2–3	3	did not advance				
Zlatko Kesler	Men's singles C3	Molitierno (ITA); W 3–1	G Rodriguez (CRC); W 3–1	1 Q	—N/a	Robin (FRA); L 2–3	did not advance		
Ilija Đurašinović; Zlatko Kesler	Men's team C4-5	—N/a			Italy (ITA); W 3–2	Norway (NOR); L 0–3	did not advance		

==== Women ====
Athlete	Event	Preliminaries				Round of 16	Quarterfinals	Semifinals	Final / BM	
Athlete	Event	Opposition Result	Opposition Result	Opposition Result	Rank	Opposition Result	Opposition Result	Opposition Result	Opposition Result	Rank
Nada Matić	Women's singles C4	Zhou Y (CHN); L 0–3	Gilroy (GBR); L 1–3	Almeida (RSA); W 3–0	3	did not advance				
Borislava Perić	Women's singles C4	Al-Azzam (JOR); W 3–2	Dolinar (SLO); W 3–0	Rozmiej (POL); W 3–0	1 Q	—N/a		Weinmann (GER); W 3–2	Zhou Y (CHN); L 0–3	2nd place, silver medalist(s)
Nada Matić; Borislava Perić	Women's team C4-5	—N/a				Great Britain (GBR); W 3–0	Italy (ITA); W 3–1	Germany (GER); L 1–3	Jordan (JOR); L 1–3	4

== See also ==
- 2008 Summer Paralympics
- Serbia at the Paralympics
- Serbia at the 2008 Summer Olympics
