= Macedonia at the 2012 Summer Paralympics =

- Flag of the Republic of Macedonia
- IPC code: MKD
- NPC: Macedonian Paralympic Committee
- Website: www.fsrim.org.mk

in London
- Competitors: 2 in 1 sport
- Medals: Gold 1 Silver 0 Bronze 0 Total 1

Summer Paralympics appearances (overview)
- 1996; 2000; 2004; 2008; 2012; 2016; 2020; 2024

Other related appearances
- Yugoslavia (1972–2000)

Macedonia competed at the 2012 Summer Paralympics in London, United Kingdom from August 29 to September 9, 2012.

== Medallists ==
Medal	Name	Sport	Event	Date
Gold	Olivera Nakovska-Bikova	Shooting	Women's 10 metre air pistol SH1	31 August

== Shooting ==
Athlete	Event	Qualification		Final	
Athlete	Event	Score	Rank	Score	Rank
Vanco Karanfilov	Men's 10m Air Pistol SH1	553	22	did not advance	
Vanco Karanfilov	Mixed 25m Pistol SH1	556	10	did not advance	
Vanco Karanfilov	Mixed 50m Pistol SH1	492	27	did not advance	
Olivera Nakovska-Bikova	Women's 10m Air Pistol SH1	381 WR	1	475.7 FPR	1st place, gold medalist(s)
Olivera Nakovska-Bikova	Mixed 25m Pistol SH1	553	12	did not advance	
Olivera Nakovska-Bikova	Mixed 50m Pistol SH1	515	17	did not advance	

== See also ==
- Macedonia at the 2012 Summer Olympics
