= Raphaël Voltz =

French Paralympic sport shooter

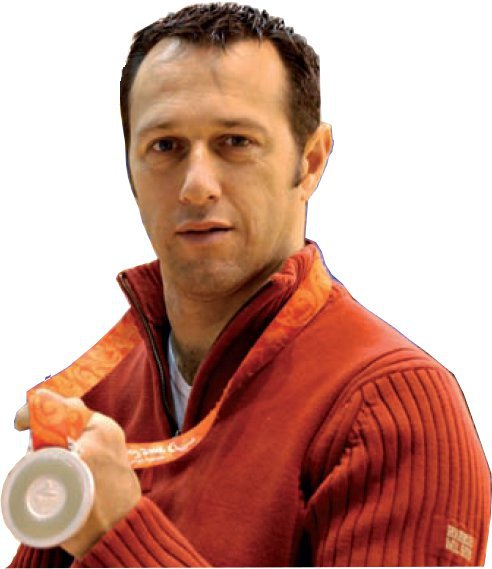

Personal information
- Born: 2 March 1971 (age 55) Strasbourg, France
- Height: 1.85 m (6 ft 1 in)
- Weight: 78 kg (172 lb)

Sport
- Country: France
- Sport: Shooting para sport
- Disability: Quadriplegia
Medal record
Shooting para sport
Representing France
Paralympic Games
Silver medal – second place	2008 Beijing	Mixed air rifle prone SH2
Silver medal – second place	2008 Beijing	Mixed air rifle standing SH2
Silver medal – second place	2012 London	Men's air rifle prone SH2
Bronze medal – third place	2000 Sydney	Men's air rifle standing SH2
World Championships
Gold medal – first place	2006 Sargans	Men's team
Gold medal – first place	2010 Zagreb	Men's air rifle standing SH2
Silver medal – second place	2010 Zagreb	Men's air rifle prone SH2
Bronze medal – third place	2010 Zagreb	Men's team
European Championships
Gold medal – first place	2007 Sohl	Men's air rifle standing SH2

Raphaël Voltz (born 2 March 1971) is a former French Paralympic sports shooter who has competed in international elite events. He is a four-time Paralympic medalist, a double World champion and European champion. He was paralysed from the waist down after a diving accident.
