= Sareh Javanmardi =

Iranian Paralympic shooter

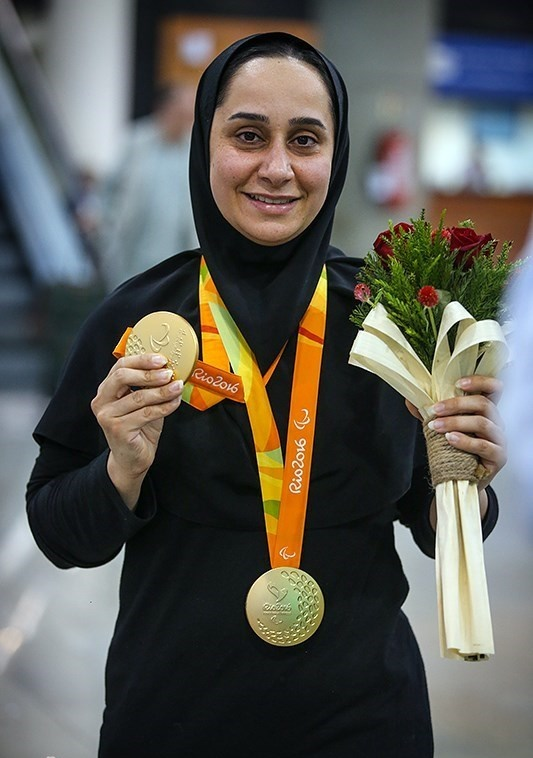
- Javanmardi in 2016

Personal information
- Native name: ساره جوانمردی
- Born: 5 December 1984 (age 41)
Medal record
Women's shooting para sport
Representing Iran
Paralympic Games
Gold medal – first place	2016 Rio de Janeiro	10 m air pistol SH1
Gold medal – first place	2016 Rio de Janeiro	Mixed 50 m pistol SH1
Gold medal – first place	2020 Tokyo	10 m air pistol SH1
Gold medal – first place	2024 Paris	10 m air pistol SH1
Bronze medal – third place	2012 London	10 m air pistol SH1
Asian Para Games
Gold medal – first place	2018 Jakarta	10 m air pistol
Silver medal – second place	2018 Jakarta	50 m free pistol
Silver medal – second place	2022 Hangzhou	10 m air pistol
Silver medal – second place	2026 Aichi–Nagoya	10 m air pistol

Sareh Javanmardi (Persian: ساره جوانمردی, born 5 December 1984) is an Iranian Paralympic shooter from Shiraz, Iran. Also known as Sareh Javanmardidodmani or Sareh Javanmardi Dodmani, she is the first ever female gold medalist from Iran to win in the shooting category of the Paralympics Games.

== Career ==
In 2012 Paralympic Games held in London, she won a bronze medal in P2 (10m air pistol SH1).

Later in 2014, she was chosen as the best Asian female athlete with impairments by the Asian Paralympic Committee. It was due to the two gold medals she won at the 2014 Asian Para Games held in Incheon, South Korea.

At the 2016 Summer Paralympics on 9 September, she scored 193.4 points to win the gold medal at the Rio de Janeiro in the P2 10m air pistol competition.

According to the Islamic Republic News Agency she won her first medal on Friday. In 2014, she took part at the 2014 IPC Shooting World Cup which takes place in Szczecin, Poland. There, she competed against Olivera Nakovska-Bikova of Macedonia.

== Awards ==
- Voted as the Allianz Best Female Athlete of the Rio 2016 Paralympic Games
- Chosen as best Asian female athlete with impairments in 2014 by the Asian Paralympic Committee.

== Results ==
Paralympic Games

1 P2 - Women's 10m Air Pistol SH1 2016 Rio de Janeiro, BRA 193.4

1 P4 - Mixed 50m Pistol SH1 2016 Rio de Janeiro, BRA 189.5

3 P2 - Women's 10m Air Pistol SH1 2012 London, GBR 469.0

World Championships

1 P2 - Women's 10m Air Pistol SH1 2018 Cheongju, KOR 237.6

1 P4 - Mixed 50m Pistol SH1 2018 Cheongju, KOR 224.5

1 P2 - Women's 10m Air Pistol SH1 2014 Suhl, GER 195.6

2 P2 - Women's 10m Air Pistol SH1 2019 Sydney, NSW, AUS 233.6

2 Women's P2 - 10m Air Pistol SH1 - Team 2014 Suhl, GER 1081

4 P4 - Mixed 50m Pistol SH1 2019 Sydney, NSW, AUS 183.8

4 Mixed P6 - 10m Air Pistol SH1 - Team 2019 Sydney, NSW, AUS 360.1

Asian Para Games

1 P2 - Women's 10m Air Pistol SH1 2018 Jakarta, INA 237.6

1 P4 - Mixed 50m Pistol SH1 2018 Jakarta, INA 220.5
