= Macedonia at the 2000 Summer Paralympics =

- Flag of the Republic of Macedonia
- IPC code: MKD
- NPC: Macedonian Paralympic Committee
- Website: www.fsrim.org.mk

in Sydney
- Medals: Gold 0 Silver 0 Bronze 0 Total 0

Summer Paralympics appearances (overview)
- 1996; 2000; 2004; 2008; 2012; 2016; 2020; 2024

Other related appearances
- Yugoslavia (1972–2000)

There were 0 female and 2 male athletes representing Macedonia at the 2000 Summer Paralympics.

== See also ==
- 2000 Summer Paralympics

== Bibliography ==
- International Paralympic Committee (2000). "Appendix C: Athlete Numbers - By Delegation". Sydney 2000 Paralympic Games Post Games Report. Sydney.
