= Macedonia at the 2004 Summer Paralympics =

- Flag of the Republic of Macedonia
- IPC code: MKD
- NPC: Macedonian Paralympic Committee
- Website: www.fsrim.org.mk

in Athens
- Competitors: 3 in 1 sport
- Medals Ranked 66th: Gold 0 Silver 1 Bronze 0 Total 1

Summer Paralympics appearances (overview)
- 1996; 2000; 2004; 2008; 2012; 2016; 2020; 2024

Other related appearances
- Yugoslavia (1972–2000)

Macedonia competed at the 2004 Summer Paralympics in Athens, Greece. The team included three athletes—two men and one woman. Macedonian competitors won a single silver medal at the Games, to finish 66th in the medal table.

== Medallists ==
Medal	Name	Sport	Event
Silver	Vanco Karanfilov	Shooting	Men's 10m air pistol SH1

== Sports ==
=== Shooting ===
==== Men ====
Athlete	Event	Qualification		Final		
Athlete	Event	Score	Rank	Score	Total	Rank
Branimir Jovanovski	Men's 10m air pistol SH1	557	11	did not advance		
Branimir Jovanovski	Mixed 25m pistol SH1	531	22	did not advance		
Branimir Jovanovski	Mixed 50m pistol SH1	525	5 Q	88.5	613.5	5
Vanco Karanfilov	Men's 10m air pistol SH1	570	1 Q	91.6	661.6	2nd place, silver medalist(s)
Vanco Karanfilov	Mixed 25m pistol SH1	553	12	did not advance		
Vanco Karanfilov	Mixed 50m pistol SH1	498	22	did not advance		

==== Women ====
Athlete	Event	Qualification		Final		
Athlete	Event	Score	Rank	Score	Total	Rank
Olivera Nakovska	Mixed 25m pistol SH1	547	14	did not advance		
Olivera Nakovska	Mixed 50m pistol SH1	490	26	did not advance		
Olivera Nakovska	Women's 10 air pistol SH1	365	3 Q	86.0	451.0	6

== See also ==
- North Macedonia at the Paralympics
- Macedonia at the 2004 Summer Olympics
