= Turkey at the 2004 Summer Paralympics =

- IPC code: TUR
- NPC: Turkish Paralympic Committee
- Website: www.tmpk.org.tr (in Turkish)

in Athens
- Competitors: 8 in 4 sports
- Medals Ranked 53rd: Gold 1 Silver 0 Bronze 1 Total 2

Summer Paralympics appearances (overview)
- 1992; 1996; 2000; 2004; 2008; 2012; 2016; 2020; 2024

Turkey competed at the 2004 Summer Paralympics in Athens. The country was represented by eight athletes, who won a total of one gold medal and one bronze.

== Medallists ==
Medal	Name	Sport	Event
Gold	Muharrem Korhan Yamac	Shooting	Mixed 25m pistol SH1
Bronze	Muharrem Korhan Yamac	Shooting	Mixed 50m pistol SH1

== Sports ==
=== Athletics ===
==== Men's track ====
Athlete	Class	Event	Heats		Semifinal		Final	
Athlete	Class	Event	Result	Rank	Result	Rank	Result	Rank
Omer Cantay	T54	100m	16.44	26	did not advance			
Omer Cantay	T54	Marathon	—				2:06:02	29

=== Powerlifting ===
==== Men ====
Athlete	Event	Result	Rank
Murat Ceylan	60kg	NMR	
Turan Mutlu	48kg	125.0	8

=== Shooting ===
Athlete	Event	Qualification		Final		
Athlete	Event	Score	Rank	Score	Total	Rank
Muhiddin Cemiloglu	Mixed 50m rifle prone SH1	574	25	did not advance		
Muharrem Korhan Yamac	Men's 10m air pistol SH1	560	7 Q	98.1	658.1	4
Muharrem Korhan Yamac	Mixed 25m pistol SH1	574 WR	1 Q	98.4	672.4	1st place, gold medalist(s)
Muharrem Korhan Yamac	Mixed 50m pistol SH1	524	6 Q	95.1	619.1	3rd place, bronze medalist(s)

=== Swimming ===
==== Men ====
Athlete	Class	Event	Heats		Final	
Athlete	Class	Event	Result	Rank	Result	Rank
Ismet Ayik	S10	100m backstroke	1:12.95	16	did not advance	
Ali Uzun	S8	100m backstroke	1:22.53	11	did not advance	

=== Table tennis ===
Athlete	Event	Preliminaries				Quarterfinals	Semifinals	Final / BM	
Athlete	Event	Opposition Result	Opposition Result	Opposition Result	Rank	Opposition Result	Opposition Result	Opposition Result	Rank
Neslihan Kavas	Women's singles 9	Lei L (CHN); L 1–3	Komleva (RUS); L 2–3	Mairie (FRA); W 3–1	3	did not advance			

== See also ==
- 2004 Summer Paralympics
- Turkey at the Paralympics
- Turkey at the 2004 Summer Olympics
