= Marina Klimenchenko =

Russian Paralympic sport shooter

Personal information
- Native name: Марина Клименченко
- Born: January 24, 1966 (age 60) Khabarovsk, Soviet Union
- Height: 1.62 m (5 ft 4 in)
- Weight: 65 kg (143 lb)
Medal record
Women's shooting para sport
Representing Russia
Paralympic Games
Bronze medal – third place	2012 London	Women's 10 metre air pistol SH1

Marina Klimenchenko (Russian: Марина Клименченко; born January 24, 1966) is a Russian Paralympic shooter from Khabarovsk who won a silver medal at the 2012 Summer Paralympics. She has Cerebral palsy and is studying medicine at Khabarovsk State Medical Institute.
