= Shooting at the 2004 Summer Paralympics =

Paralympic Games

Shooting at the XII Paralympic Games
- Paralympic Shooting
- Venue: Markopoulo Olympic Shooting Centre
- Dates: 18–23 September 2004
- Competitors: 142 from 35 nations

Shooting in the 2004 Summer Paralympics consisted of twelve events spread over two main classes:

- Class SH 1 - Pistol and rifle competitors who don't require a shooting stand
- Class SH 2 - Rifle competitors who require a shooting stand due to disability in the upper limbs

The contests were held at the Markopoulo Olympic Shooting Centre.

== Participating countries ==
- Australia (5)
- Austria (4)
- Azerbaijan (1)
- Belgium (3)
- Canada (5)
- China (7)
- Chinese Taipei (4)
- Croatia (2)
- Denmark (3)
- Estonia (1)
- Finland (6)
- France (3)
- Germany (14)
- Great Britain (3)
- Greece (2)
- Hong Kong (1)
- Iran (9)
- Israel (4)
- Italy (5)
- Japan (6)
- Macedonia (3)
- New Zealand (2)
- Poland (4)
- Puerto Rico (1)
- Russia (6)
- Slovakia (3)
- Slovenia (4)
- South Africa (1)
- South Korea (11)
- Spain (3)
- Sweden (6)
- Switzerland (5)
- Thailand (1)
- Turkey (3)
- United States (1)

== Medal table ==
Rank	Nation	Gold	Silver	Bronze	Total
1	Sweden (SWE)	4	1	1	6
2	South Korea (KOR)	1	4	0	5
3	Germany (GER)	1	1	2	4
4	Russia (RUS)	1	0	1	2
4	Turkey (TUR)	1	0	1	2
6	China (CHN)	1	0	0	1
6	Finland (FIN)	1	0	0	1
6	Great Britain (GBR)	1	0	0	1
6	New Zealand (NZL)	1	0	0	1
10	Australia (AUS)	0	1	1	2
10	Austria (AUT)	0	1	1	2
12	Chinese Taipei (TPE)	0	1	0	1
12	Macedonia (MKD)	0	1	0	1
12	Slovenia (SLO)	0	1	0	1
12	United States (USA)	0	1	0	1
16	Denmark (DEN)	0	0	2	2
16	Israel (ISR)	0	0	2	2
18	Azerbaijan (AZE)	0	0	1	1
Totals (18 entries)		12	12	12	36

== Medal summary ==
Event	Gold	Silver	Bronze
Men's air pistol SH1	Jian Fei Li; China	Vanco Karanfilov; Macedonia	Hubert Aufschnaiter; Austria
Men's air rifle standing SH1	Jonas Jacobsson; Sweden	Franc Pinter; Slovenia	Ashley Adams; Australia
Men's free rifle 3x40 SH1	Jonas Jacobsson; Sweden	Dan Jordan; United States	Doron Shaziri; Israel
Women's air pistol SH1	Isabel Newstead; Great Britain	Chin Mei Lin; Chinese Taipei	Yelena Taranova; Azerbaijan
Women's air rifle standing SH1	Manuela Schmermund; Germany	Myung Sook Her; South Korea	Sabine Brogle; Germany
Women's sport rifle 3x20 SH1	Myung Sook Her; South Korea	Im Yeon Kim; South Korea	Manuela Schmermund; Germany
Mixed air rifle prone SH1	Jonas Jacobsson; Sweden	Jae Yong Sim; South Korea	Kazimierz Mechula; Denmark
Mixed air rifle prone SH2	Minna Leinonen; Finland	Gyoung You Ho; South Korea	Johnny Andersen; Denmark
Mixed air rifle standing SH2	Michael Johnson; New Zealand	Thomas Johansson; Sweden	Viktoria Wedin; Sweden
Mixed free pistol SH1	Andrey Lebedinskiy; Russia	Roland Hartmann; Germany	Muharrem Korhan Yamac; Turkey
Mixed free rifle prone SH1	Jonas Jacobsson; Sweden	Ashley Adams; Australia	Doron Shaziri; Israel
Mixed sport pistol SH1	Muharrem Korhan Yamac; Turkey	Hubert Aufschnaiter; Austria	Andrey Lebedinskiy; Russia

== See also ==
- Shooting at the 2004 Summer Olympics
