= Aysel Özgan =

Turkish Paralympic sport shooter

Personal information
- Born: 5 May 1978 (age 48) Giresun, Turkey
- Home town: Bursa, Turkey
- Years active: 2004 – Present

Sport
- Sport: Paralympic pistol shooting
- Event: P2 Women's 10m air pistol SH1, P4 Mixed 50m air pistol SH1
- Club: Yıldırım Belediyespor
Medal record
Paralympic pistol shooting
Representing Turkey
Paralympic Games
Silver medal – second place	2024 Paris	P2 SH1
IPC World Cup
Gold medal – first place	2017 Hannover	P4 SH1
Silver medal – second place	2016 Bangkok	P4 SH1
Silver medal – second place	2015 Fort Benning	P2 SH1
Gold medal – first place	2012 Szczecin	P2 SH1

Aysel Özgan (born 5 May 1978) is a Turkish female paralympic shooter competing in the pistol events. She took part at the 2008, 2012 and 2016 Summer Paralympic Games.

== Early life ==
Aysel Özgan was born in Giresun, Turkey on 5 May 1978. When she was 12 years old, she was forced to interrupt her education because of health problems. She twice underwent surgery on her neck following a separation of the vertebrae due to an aneurysmal bone cyst. She was paralyzed below her chest due to complications that arose from the second surgery and is unable to walk, with restricted movement in her right arm. She uses a wheelchair.

After passing a special exam for physically disabled persons, she was appointed a government official.

In 2015, Özgan moved to Bursa, Turkey. She is an employee of the provincial Youth Services and Sports Administration.

== Sporting career ==
Özgan's shooting sport career began in 2004 when the Turkish Shooting Championships were hosted in her hometown of Giresun, Upon urging of her friends, she applied for a license to shoot, and took part in the competition as the only female athlete. She won the championship on her first attempt even though she had not used a firearm before.

She was called up to the qualifiers, and was selected for the national Paralympic shooting team one year after the first tournament in which she participated.

Özgan competes in the P2 women's 10m air pistol SH1 and P4 Mixed 50m air pistol SH1 events. Paralympic shooters, who do not need a shooting stand to support the firearm, are categorized in the SH1 class. Özgan is a member of Yıldırım Belediyespor in Bursa.

She represented her country at the 2008 Beijing Paralympics and 2012 London Paralympics. At the 2015 IPC Shooting World Cup held in Fort Benning, USA, she qualified to participate at the 2016 Rio Paralympics.

Özgan took the gold medal in the P2 SH1 event at the 2012 IPC Shooting World Cup held in Szczecin, Poland.

In 2015, Özgan won the silver medal in the P2 10m air pistol SH1 event at the IPC Shooting World Cup held in Fort Benning, United States. This success brought her a quota spot for the 2016 Summer Paralympics. She placed seventh in the P2 10m air pistol SH1 qualification event at the 2015 IPC Shooting World Cup in Osijek, Croatia.

She won the 2016 Turkish Shooting Championship in the 10m air pistol event. At the 2016 IPC Shooting World Cup in Bangkok, Thailand, she took the silver medal with her teammates in the P4 SH1 event.

She became gold medalist in the P4 50m air pistol event of SH1 category at the 2017 IPC World Cup held in Hannover, Germany.
