= Sergey Malyshev (sport shooter) =

Russian Paralympic sport shooter

Personal information
- Native name: Сергей Малышев
- Born: 5 March 1976 (age 50) Balashov, Soviet Union

Sport
- Coached by: Marina Moiseeva
Medal record
Men's shooting para sport
Representing Russia
Paralympic Games
Silver medal – second place	2008 Beijing	Men's 10 metre air pistol SH1
Silver medal – second place	2012 London	Mixed 25 metre pistol SH1
Bronze medal – third place	2020 Tokyo	Mixed 50 m pistol SH1
IPC Shooting World Championships
Gold medal – first place	2014 Suhl	Men's 10m Air Rifle Standing SH1
Silver medal – second place	2006 Sargans	Mixed 50m Pistol SH1
Silver medal – second place	2006 Sargans	10m Air Pistol Standard SH1
Silver medal – second place	2014 Suhl	Men's 10m Air Pistol SH1
Silver medal – second place	2014 Suhl	Mixed 25m Pistol SH1
Silver medal – second place	2014 Suhl	Mixed 50m Pistol SH1 - Team
Silver medal – second place	2019 Sydney	Men's 10m Air Pistol SH1

Sergey Malyshev (Russian: Сергей Малышев; born 5 March 1976) is a Russian Paralympic shooter from Balashov who won a silver medal at the 2008 and 2012 Summer Paralympics, and also represented the nation at the 1996 and 2020 Summer Paralympics.

== Awards ==
- Medal of the Order "For Merit to the Fatherland" II class (30 September 2009)
- Medal of the Order "For Merit to the Fatherland" I class (10 September 2012)
- Russian Federation Presidential Certificate of Honour (19 September 2016)
