= Francisco Ángel Soriano San Martin =

Spanish sport shooter (born 1949)

Francisco Ángel Soriano
Personal information
- Full name: Francisco Ángel Soriano San Martín
- Nationality: Spanish
- Born: 28 March 1949 (age 77) Langreo, Spain

Sport
- Country: Spain
- Sport: Shooting (SH1-SH2)
Medal record
Sport shooting
Representing Spain
Paralympic Games
Gold medal – first place	1996 Atlanta	Free Pistol .50 P4, Mixed SH1
Bronze medal – third place	2000 Sydney	Free Pistol .50 P4, Mixed SH1

Francisco Ángel Soriano San Martín (born 28 March 1949 in Langreo, Asturias) is a SH1 shooter from Spain. In 2012, he was retired and a pensioner. Soriano competed at the 1988 Summer Paralympics, 1992 Summer Paralympics, 1996 Summer Paralympics, 2000 Summer Paralympics, 2004 Summer Paralympics, 2008 Summer Paralympics and 2012 Summer Paralympics. In 1996, he won a gold medal in the Free Pistol .50 P4, Mixed SH1 competition. In 2000, he won a bronze in the Free Pistol .50 P4, Mixed SH1 competition.

== Personal ==
Soriano was born on March 28, 1949, in Las Tejeras-Langreo, Asturias. As a 16-year-old, he emigrated to Belgium. When living and working in Belgium for an elevator company as a 26 years old, he was injured in an accident at work that left him a paraplegic. The accident damaged his 9th and 10 vertebrae. He rehabilitated for a year in Brussels, with the first few months spent in bed. By 1982, he was married. Together, they decided to move to Spain in 1982. In 2012, he was based in Elche, and a retired pensioner. Prior to taking up shooting, he tried a number of disability sports including wheelchair basketball, wheelchair fencing, swimming and archery. He spent three years participating in archery.

== Shooting ==
Soriano is a SH1 shooter. After initially trying several sports following his accident, he tried shooting following the suggestion of a teacher. He tried the sport several times before making the decision to purchase a gun.

Competing at the 1981 Belgian Championship, Soriano finished in first place. He won a silver medal at the 1986 Stoke Mandeville Games in the P1 event. He made his Paralympic debut at the 1988 Summer Paralympics. Ghent hosted 1989 European Championships, where he won a silver medal in the P4 50 meter Mixed pistol SH1 event. At the Stoke Mandeville Games in 1990, he came away with a gold medal in the 10 meter air pistol event.

Soriano represented Spain at the 1992 Summer Paralympics and the 2012 Summer Paralympics. He was one of only seven Spanish Paralympians to do so. At the Barcelona Games in 1992, he finished fifth. Competing at the Linz, Austria hosted world championsions in 1994, he won a gold medal in the P4 event. The 1995 European Championships were held in Järvenpää, Finland. He failed to medal at the event, finishing fourth in the P3 25 meter Sport Pistol SH1 mixed event, seventh in the P4 50 meter Mixed pistol SH1 event and eighth in the 10 meter Men's air pistol SH1 event.

Soriano competed at the 1996 Summer Paralympics. In 1996, he won a gold medal in the Pistol 50 meter P4, Mixed SH1 competition. European Championship 1997 saw Chatenoy Le Royal, France host the European Championships, with Soriano winning a pair of bronze medals in the P1 10 meter Men's air pistol SH1 and P4 50 meter Mixed pistol SH1 events. At the 1998 World Championships in Santander, he won a bronze medal in the team event.

Soriano competed at the 2000 Summer Paralympics. In 2000, he won a bronze in the P4 Pistol 50 meter Mixed SH1 competition. The 2001 European Championship were held in Vingsted, Denmark, with Soriano picking up a gold medal in the P4 50 meter Pistol SH1 event, while having a fifth-place finish in the P1 10 m. Men's air pistol SH1 and a twenty-fourth-place finish in the P3 25 meter mixed sporting pistol SH1 event. The World Championships were held in Seoul, South Korea in 2002, with Soriano picking up a gold in the P4 event. The 2003 European Championship took place in Brno, Czech Republic, with Soriano finishing first in the P4 50 meter Mixed pistol SH1 event and ninth in the P3 SH1 event.

Soriano competed at the 2004 Summer Paralympics. Suhl, Germany hosted the 2007 European Championships, where he won a silver medal in the P1 10 meter men's air pistol SH1 event.

Soriano competed at the 2008 Summer Paralympics.

The May 2012 Copa del Rey held at the Catalan Shooting Federation's range in Mollet del Vallés was an opportunity for him to set qualifying marks for the 2012 Paralympic Games, which he did in the 50 meter SH1 men's pistol event. The scores won him the event. He also earned a first-place finish in the 25 meter sport pistol, while having a third-place finish in the P1 10 meter men's air pistol event. As a sixty-three-year-old, he competed at the 2012 Summer Paralympics. He was the most experienced Paralympian on the Spanish team and was the oldest member of the Spanish team. Going into the 2012 Games, he was Spain's most decorated Paralympic shooter, and one of the country's best Paralympic shooters period. During the 2012 Games, he was already thinking about trying to qualify for the 2016 Summer Paralympics as his next dream. In his own words, "I view life as a challenge every single day. If I don't have a dream, the torch's fire will burn out. I know people who leave the job and have no more dreams, and head to an early grave". The Lucentum de Alicante Shooting Club hosted 2013 European Championships in October. He participated in the event.
