= Hubert Aufschnaiter =

Austrian Paralympic shooter

Personal information
- Born: 7 June 1963 (age 63) Wörgl, Austria

Sport
- Country: Austria
- Sport: Paralympic shooting
Medal record
Paralympic shooting
Representing Austria
Paralympic Games
Gold medal – first place	1988 Seoul	Air pistol team open
Silver medal – second place	1988 Seoul	Air pistol 2-6
Silver medal – second place	1996 Atlanta	Air pistol SH1
Silver medal – second place	2004 Athens	Sport pistol SH1
Bronze medal – third place	1992 Barcelona	Sport pistol SH1-3
Bronze medal – third place	2000 Sydney	Air pistol SH1
Bronze medal – third place	2004 Athens	Air pistol SH1

Hubert Aufschnaiter (born 7 June 1963) is an Austrian retired Paralympic shooter who competed at international shooting sports competitions. He has competed at the Paralympic Games seven times consecutively and has won seven medals.
