= Muharrem Korhan Yamaç =

Turkish Paralympic shooter

Personal information
- Nationality: Turkish
- Born: 31 October 1972 (age 53) Edirne, Turkey

Sport
- Event: 10m air pistol SH1
- Club: Ağasar Sport Club
- Coached by: Nevzat Yamaç
Medal record
Shooting
Representing Turkey
Summer Paralympics
Gold medal – first place	2004 Athens	Mixed sport pistol SH1
Silver medal – second place	2012 London	Men's 10m air pistol SH1
Bronze medal – third place	2004 Athens	Mixed free pistol SH1
IPC World Championships
Bronze medal – third place	2011 Zagreb	50m free pistol
IPC World Cup
Gold medal – first place	2010 Antalya	10m air pistol P1
Gold medal – first place	2011 Alicante	10m air pistol SH1
Gold medal – first place	2012 Antalya	10m air pistol P1
IPC European Championships
Gold medal – first place	2005 Poland	50m free pistol
Silver medal – second place	2003 Czech Rep	25m free pistol
Silver medal – second place	2007 Germany	25m air pistol
Bronze medal – third place	2003 Czech Rep	50m free pistol
Bronze medal – third place	2005 Poland	25m sport pistol
- Updated on 30 August 2012

Muharrem Korhan Yamaç (born 31 October 1972, in Edirne, Turkey) is a Paralympics, world and European champion disabled sport shooter from Turkey competing in the air pistol events of 10m, 25m and 50m.

He was an army officer at the rank of a lieutenant as he stepped onto a land mine and lost his right foot.

Yamaç competed at the 2004 Summer Paralympics winning a gold and a bronze medal. At the 2008 Summer Paralympics, he was the flagbearer of his nation.

He won gold, silver and bronze medals at world and European events. He qualified again for his third time participation at the Summer Paralympics.

== Achievements ==
Year	Competition	Venue	Position	Event	Notes
Representing Turkey
2003	IPC European Championships	Czech Republic	2nd	25m free pistol	
2003	IPC European Championships	Czech Republic	3rd	50m free pistol	
2004	Paralympics	Athens, Greece	3rd	Mixed free pistol SH1	
2004	Paralympics	Athens, Greece	1st	Mixed sport pistol SH1	
2005	IPC European Championships	Poland	3rd	25m sport pistol	
2005	IPC European Championships	Poland	1st	50m free pistol	
2006	IPC World Championships	Switzerland	4th	25m sport pistol	
2006	IPC World Championships	Switzerland	4th	50m free pistol	
2007	IPC European Championships	Germany	2nd	25 m sport pistol	ER
2008	Paralympics	Beijing, China	8th	10m air pistol SH1	
2008	Paralympics	Beijing, China	6th	50m air pistol	
2010	IPC World Cup Turkey	Antalya, Turkey	1st	10m air pistol P1	657.5
2011	IPC World Cup Spain	Alicante, Spain	1st	10m air pistol SH1	662.7
2011	IPC World Championships	Zagreb, Croatia	3rd	50m free pistol	623.7
2012	IPC World Cup Turkey	Antalya, Turkey	1st	10m air pistol P1	671.7
2012	Summer Paralympics	London, United Kingdom	2nd	10m air pistol SH1	664.7

Paralympics
Preceded by unknown	Flagbearer for Turkey; Beijing 2008	Succeeded by Gizem Girişmen
