= Yelena Taranova =

Azerbaijani Paralympic shooter

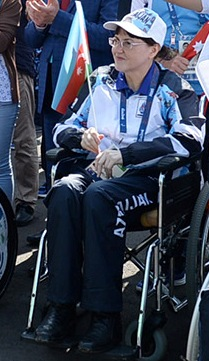
- Taranova in 2016

Personal information
- Born: August 23, 1961 (age 64) Baku, Azerbaijan

Sport
- Country: Azerbaijan
- Club: Neftchi
Medal record
Shooting para sport
Representing Azerbaijan
Paralympic Games
Silver medal – second place	2000 Sydney	50m free pistol
Bronze medal – third place	2004 Athens	10m air pistol
World Cup
Silver medal – second place	2010 Antalya	10m air pistol
Bronze medal – third place	2010 Bad Orb	10m air pistol
Gold medal – first place	2010 Volmerange-les-Mines	10m air pistol
Bronze medal – third place	2010 Volmerange-les-Mines	50m pistol team
Gold medal – first place	2011 Columbus	10m air pistol
Gold medal – first place	2011 Columbus	50m free pistol
Bronze medal – third place	2012 Antalya	10m air pistol
European Championships
Bronze medal – third place	2001 Vingsted	10m air pistol
Silver medal – second place	2001 Vingsted	50m free pistol

Yelena Taranova (born 23 August 1961 in Baku) is an Azerbaijani paralympic sport shooter. A silver medalist of the 2000 Summer Paralympics and bronze medalist of the 2004 Summer Paralympics, 2010 Volmerange-les-Mines and 2011 Columbus World Cup winner, she represented Azerbaijan in the 2012 Summer Paralympics.

Yelena Taranova is the 1st in World Ranking List in Women's 10m Air Pistol SH1 and Mixed 50m Free Pistol SH1 categories.

== Results ==
Paralympic Games

2 Mixed Free Pistol SH1 2000 Sydney, NSW, AUS 622.7

3 Women's Air Pistol SH1 2004 Athens, GRE 457.3

4 P2 - Women's 10m Air Pistol SH1 2016 Rio de Janeiro, BRA 148.8

6 Women's Air Pistol SH1 2008 Beijing, CHN 460.1

7 P2 - Women's 10m Air Pistol SH1 2012 London, GBR 465.9

7 Women's Air Pistol SH1 2000 Sydney, NSW, AUS 454.2

13 P3 - Mixed 25m Pistol SH1 2016 Rio de Janeiro, BRA 560

13 Mixed Free Pistol SH1 2004 Athens, GRE 517

16 Mixed Free Pistol SH1 2008 Beijing, CHN 517

20 P4 - Mixed 50m Pistol SH1 2012 London, GBR 513

25 Mixed Sport Pistol SH1 2008 Beijing, CHN 527

27 P4 - Mixed 50m Pistol SH1 2016 Rio de Janeiro, BRA 503

DNS P3 - Mixed 25m Pistol SH1 2012 London, GBR DNS

World Championships

3 Mixed P4 - 50m Pistol SH1 - Team 2014 Suhl, GER 1532

5 P2 - Women's 10m Air Pistol SH1 2006 Sargans, SUI 456.9

8 P2 - Women's 10m Air Pistol SH1 2010 Zagreb, CRO 453.2

14 P2 - Women's 10m Air Pistol SH1 2014 Suhl, GER 357

17 P2 - Women's 10m Air Pistol SH1 2019 Sydney, NSW, AUS 543

20 P3 - Mixed 25m Pistol SH1 2019 Sydney, NSW, AUS 557

24 P3 - Mixed 25m Pistol SH1 2018 Cheongju, KOR 539

24 P3 - Mixed 25m Pistol SH1 2006 Sargans, SUI

26 P2 - Women's 10m Air Pistol SH1 2018 Cheongju, KOR 526

26 P4 - Mixed 50m Pistol SH1 2014 Suhl, GER 506

39 P4 - Mixed 50m Pistol SH1 2019 Sydney, NSW, AUS 500

40 P4 - Mixed 50m Pistol SH1 2010 Zagreb, CRO

== Education ==
Azerbaijan State Oil and Industry University, Baku, AZE

Languages spoken:Russian

Coach: Akbar Muradov [national], AZE

Start: 1999 in Baku, Azerbaijan.
