= Olivera Nakovska-Bikova =

Macedonian sports shooter

Personal information
- National team: North Macedonia
- Born: 22 November 1974 (age 51) Bitola, SR Macedonia, SFR Yugoslavia
- Occupation: Athlete
- Spouse: Zlatko Bikov

Sport
- Country: North Macedonia
- Sport: Shooting sports
- Disability: SH1
- Club: SSRI Bitola [North Macedonia]
- Coached by: Branimir Jovanovski
Medal record
Women's shooting para sport
Representing Macedonia
Paralympic Games
| Gold medal – first place | 2012 London | Individual 10 m air pistol SH1 |
IPC World Championships
| Silver medal – second place | 2002 Seoul | Team 10 m air pistol SH1 |
| Bronze medal – third place | 2013 Suhl | Individual 10 m air pistol SH1 |
ISSF European Championships
| Gold medal – first place | 2001 Zagreb | Individual 10 m air pistol SH1 |
- Updated on 14 November 2017

Olivera Nakovska-Bikova (born 11 November 1974) is a Macedonian paralympian and sports shooter who won the gold medal in the women's 10 metre air pistol SH1 at the 2012 Summer Paralympics in London, England. Olivera is also competing in the Tokyo 2020 Paralympics Games.

== Career ==
Olivera Nakovska-Bikova was born in Bitola, SR Macedonia. She went on to compete in shooting sports, becoming successful specifically with air pistols, winning the European Championships in 2001 and being part of the team who won the silver medal at the 2002 IPC Shooting World Championships. She attended her first Summer Paralympics in Athens, Greece, in 2004, where she finished sixth in the competition.

She qualified for the 2012 Summer Paralympics in London, England, following a third-place result at a World Cup event in Zagreb in 2010. At the Paralympics, she competed in the 10 metre air pistol SH1 and sets a new Paralympic Record to win the gold medal. After her win, Nakovska-Bikova was telephoned by Gjorge Ivanov, President of Macedonia, to congratulate her, while Prime Minister Nikola Gruevski sent her a messaging praising her achievement. Online commentators were critical of the lack of priority given in the media to Nakovska-Bikova's victory, with none of the national news programmes including it as the lead story. The Government of Macedonia subsequently awarded Nakovska-Bikova with €30,000.

She was selected once again for Macedonia for the 2016 Summer Paralympics in Rio de Janeiro, Brazil. Nakovska-Bikova's best result at the 2016 was the fourth place she achieved in the mixed 50 metre air pistol SH1.
