= Table tennis at the 2008 Summer Paralympics =

Table tennis at the XIII Paralympic Games
- Venue: Peking University Gymnasium
- Dates: 7–15 September 2008

Table tennis at the 2008 Summer Paralympics was held in the Peking University Gymnasium from September 7 to September 15.

== Classification ==
Players are given a classification depending on the type and extent of their disability. The classification system allows players to compete against others with a similar level of function. Table tennis has ten numbered classes, with lower numbers corresponding to more severe disability. Classes one through five compete in wheelchairs and classes six through ten compete while standing.

== Events ==
Twenty-four events were contested. The events are men's and women's team and individual competitions for the various disability classifications.

- Men's individual
  - Class 1
  - Class 2
  - Class 3
  - Class 4–5
  - Class 6
  - Class 7
  - Class 8
  - Class 9–10

- Men's team
  - Class 1–2
  - Class 3
  - Class 4–5
  - Class 6–8
  - Class 9–10

- Women's individual
  - Class 1–2
  - Class 3
  - Class 4
  - Class 5
  - Class 6–7
  - Class 8
  - Class 9
  - Class 10

- Women's team
  - Class 1–3
  - Class 4–5
  - Class 6–10

== Participating countries ==
264 athletes (168 male, 96 female) took part in this sport.

- Argentina (2)
- Australia (2)
- Austria (8)
- Belgium (3)
- Brazil (11)
- Canada (1)
- China (26)
- Costa Rica (2)
- Chinese Taipei (8)
- Croatia (4)
- Cuba (4)
- Czech Republic (6)
- Denmark (3)
- Egypt (4)
- Finland (1)
- France (26)
- Germany (12)
- Great Britain (11)
- Hong Kong (4)
- Hungary (3)
- Iran (2)
- Ireland (2)
- Israel (4)
- Italy (13)
- Japan (2)
- Jordan (3)
- Libya (2)
- Mexico (2)
- Netherlands (4)
- Nigeria (5)
- Norway (2)
- Poland (10)
- Russia (9)
- Serbia (4)
- Slovakia (10)
- Slovenia (5)
- South Africa (4)
- South Korea (14)
- Spain (5)
- Sweden (9)
- Thailand (2)
- Turkey (1)
- Ukraine (6)
- United States (4)
- Venezuela (1)

== Medal summary ==
=== Medal table ===
This ranking sorts countries by the number of gold medals earned by their players (in this context a country is an entity represented by a National Paralympic Committee). The number of silver medals is taken into consideration next, and then the number of bronze medals. If, after the above, countries are still tied, equal ranking is given and they are listed alphabetically.

Rank	Nation	Gold	Silver	Bronze	Total
1	China (CHN)	13	6	3	22
2	France (FRA)	4	3	5	12
3	South Korea (KOR)	1	2	4	7
4	Germany (GER)	1	2	1	4
4	Slovakia (SVK)	1	2	1	4
6	Poland (POL)	1	2	0	3
7	Russia (RUS)	1	1	0	2
8	Austria (AUT)	1	0	0	1
8	Denmark (DEN)	1	0	0	1
10	Italy (ITA)	0	2	1	3
11	Spain (ESP)	0	1	2	3
12	Sweden (SWE)	0	1	1	2
13	Brazil (BRA)	0	1	0	1
13	Serbia (SRB)	0	1	0	1
15	Netherlands (NED)	0	0	2	2
16	Jordan (JOR)	0	0	1	1
16	Norway (NOR)	0	0	1	1
16	Slovenia (SLO)	0	0	1	1
16	Turkey (TUR)	0	0	1	1
Totals (19 entries)		24	24	24	72

=== Men's events ===
Event	Gold	Silver	Bronze
Men's Individual – Class 1	Andreas Vevera; Austria	Cho Jae-Kwan; South Korea	Lee Hae-Kon; South Korea
Men's Individual – Class 2	Vincent Boury; France	Stephane Molliens; France	Kim Kyung-Mook; South Korea
Men's Individual – Class 3	Feng Panfeng; China	Jean-Philippe Robin; France	Tomas Piñas; Spain
Men's Individual – Class 4–5	Christophe Durand; France	Jung Eun-Chang; South Korea	Tommy Urhaug; Norway
Men's Individual – Class 6	Peter Rosenmeier; Denmark	Daniel Arnold; Germany	Nico Blok; Netherlands
Men's Individual – Class 7	Jochen Wollmert; Germany	Ye Chaoqun; China	Álvaro Valera; Spain
Men's Individual – Class 8	Chen Gang; China	Piotr Grudzien; Poland	Miroslav Jambor; Slovakia
Men's Individual – Class 9–10	Ge Yang; China	Ma Lin; China	Fredrick Andersson; Sweden
Team Class 1–2	Slovakia (SVK); Rastislav Revúcky; Jan Riapos	France (FRA); Vincent Boury; Jean-François Ducay; Damien Mennella; Stephane Molliens	South Korea (KOR); Cho Jae-Kwan; Kim Kong-Yong; Kim Kyung-Mook; Lee Hae-Kon
Team Class 3	France (FRA); Yann Guilhem; Florian Merrien; Jean-Phillipe Robin	Brazil (BRA); Welder Knaf; Luiz Algacir Silva	China (CHN); Feng Panfeng; Gao Yanming; Zhao Ping
Team Class 4–5	South Korea (KOR); Jung Eun-chang; Kim Byoung-young	China (CHN); Guo Xingyuan; Zhang Yan	France (FRA); Christophe Durand; Emeric Martin
Team Class 6–8	China (CHN); Ye Chaoqun; Chen Gang	Slovakia (SVK); Miroslav Jambor; Richard Csejtey	France (FRA); Stephane Messi; François Sérignat
Team Class 9–10	China (CHN); Ge Yang; Ma Lin	Spain (ESP); José Manuel Ruiz Reyes; Jorge Cardona	France (FRA); Gilles de la Bourdonnaye; Jeremy Rousseau

=== Women's events ===
Event	Gold	Silver	Bronze
Women's Individual – Class 1–2	Liu Jing; China	Pamela Pezzutto; Italy	Clara Podda; Italy
Women's Individual – Class 3	Li Qian; China	Alena Kánová; Slovakia	Mateja Pintar; Slovenia
Women's Individual – Class 4	Zhou Ying; China	Borislava Perić; Serbia	Moon Sung-Hye; South Korea
Women's Individual – Class 5	Ren Guixiang; China	Gu Gai; China	Andrea Zimmerer; Germany
Women's Individual – Class 6–7	Natalia Martyasheva; Russia	Yulia Ovsyannikova; Russia	Kelly van Zon; Netherlands
Women's Individual – Class 8	Thu Kamkasomphou; France	Josefin Abrahamsson; Sweden	Zhang Xiaoling; China
Women's Individual – Class 9	Lei Lina; China	Liu Meili; China	Neslihan Kavas; Turkey
Women's Individual – Class 10	Natalia Partyka; Poland	Fan Lei; China	Hou Chunxiao; China
Team Class 1–3	China (CHN); Li Qian; Liu Jing	Italy (ITA); Michela Brunelli; Federica Cudia; Pamela Pezzutto; Clara Podda	France (FRA); Fanny Bertrand; Marie-Christine Fillou; Isabelle Lafaye; Stephanie Mariage
Team Class 4–5	China (CHN); Ren Guixiang; Gu Gai	Germany (GER); Monika Sikora-Weinmann; Andrea Zimmerer	Jordan (JOR); Khetam Abuawad; Fatmeh Al-Azzam
Team Class 6–10	China (CHN); Lei Lina; Fan Lei	Poland (POL); Natalia Partyka; Malgorzata Grzelak	France (FRA); Thu Kamkasomphou; Audrey Le Morvan; Claire Mairie

== See also ==
- Table tennis at the 2008 Summer Olympics
