= France at the 2008 Summer Paralympics =

- IPC code: FRA
- NPC: French Paralympic and Sports Committee
- Website: france-paralympique.fr

in Beijing
- Competitors: 119 in 13 sports
- Flag bearer: Assia El'Hannouni
- Medals Ranked 12th: Gold 12 Silver 21 Bronze 19 Total 52

Summer Paralympics appearances (overview)
- 1960; 1964; 1968; 1972; 1976; 1980; 1984; 1988; 1992; 1996; 2000; 2004; 2008; 2012; 2016; 2020; 2024

France sent a delegation to compete at the 2008 Summer Paralympics in Beijing. France sent 119 athletes, who competed in 13 sports: archery, athletics, cycling, equestrian, wheelchair fencing, powerlifting, judo, sailing, shooting, swimming, table tennis, wheelchair tennis. There were some competitors that competed in rowing which made its debut in the Games.

The country's flagbearer during the Games' opening ceremony was Assia El'Hannouni, who won four gold medals at the 2004 Summer Paralympics.

== Medalists ==
Medal	Name	Sport	Event
Gold	David Smétanine	Swimming	Men's 100m freestyle S4
Gold	Arnaud Assoumani	Athletics	Men's long jump F46
Gold	Thu Kamkasomphou	Table tennis	Women's singles class 8
Gold	Christophe Durand	Table tennis	Men's singles class 4/5
Gold	Vincent Boury	Table tennis	Men's singles class 2
Gold	Laurent Thirionet	Cycling	Men's cycling, road time trial
Gold	Laurent François	Wheelchair fencing	Men's individual sabre, category B
Gold	Stéphane Houdet; Michael Jeremiasz	Wheelchair tennis	Men's doubles
Gold	David Smétanine	Swimming	Men's 50m freestyle S4
Gold	Florian Merrien; Yan Guilhem; Jean-Philippe Robin	Table tennis	Men's team class 3
Gold	Assia El'Hannouni	Athletics	Women's 200m T12
Gold	Assia El'Hannouni	Athletics	Women's 400m T12
Silver	Sandrine Martinet	Judo	Women's -52 kg
Silver	Cyril Jonard	Judo	Men's -81 kg
Silver	David Smétanine	Swimming	Men's 50m backstroke S4
Silver	David Smétanine	Swimming	Men's 200m freestyle S4
Silver	Assia El'Hannouni	Athletics	Women's 800m sprint T13/12
Silver	Marie-Amélie Le Fur	Athletics	Women's long jump F44
Silver	Raphaël Voltz	Shooting	Men's mixed R5 10m rifle prone SH2
Silver	Jean-Philippe Robin	Table tennis	Men's singles class 3
Silver	Raphaël Voltz	Shooting	Men's mixed R4-10m air rifle standing SH2
Silver	Elodie Lorandi	Swimming	Women's 200m individual medley SM10
Silver	Stéphane Molliens	Table tennis	Men's singles class 2
Silver	Laurent François	Wheelchair fencing	Men's individual foil, category B
Silver	Damien Séguin	Sailing	Men's 1-Person Keelboat (2.4mR)
Silver	Bruno Jourdren; Hervé Larhant; Nicolas Vimont-Vicary	Sailing	Men's 3-Person Keelboat (Sonar)
Silver	David Mercier	Cycling	Men's individual road race, LC 1/LC 2/CP 4
Silver	Rachel Lardière	Swimming	Women's 100m breaststroke SB5
Silver	Vincent Boury; Damien Mennella; Jean-François Ducay; Stéphane Molliens	Table tennis	Men's team, classes 1/2
Silver	Fabrice Meunier	Archery	Men's individual recurve, standing
Silver	Nantenin Keita	Athletics	Women's 200m T13
Silver	Marie-Amélie Le Fur	Athletics	Women's 100m T44
Silver	Assia El'Hannouni	Athletics	Women's 1500m T13
Bronze	Angélique Quessandier	Judo	Women's -63 kg
Bronze	Gautier Trésor	Athletics	Men's 100m T11
Bronze	Olivier Cugnon de Sevricourt	Judo	Men's -90 kg
Bronze	Julien Taurines	Judo	Men's +100 kg
Bronze	Djamel Mastouri	Athletics	Men's 800m T37
Bronze	Souhad Ghazouani	Powerlifting	Women's -48 kg: 112,5 kg
Bronze	Alain Quittet	Cycling	Men's cycling, handbike time trial
Bronze	Florence Gravellier	Wheelchair tennis	Women's singles
Bronze	Florence Gravellier; Arlette Racineux	Wheelchair tennis	Women's doubles
Bronze	Olivier Donval; John Saccomandi	Cycling	Men's individual road race B&VI 1-3
Bronze	François Sérignat; Stéphane Messi; Alain Pichon	Table tennis	Men's team, classes 6-8
Bronze	Jérémie Rousseau; Christophe Rozier; Gilles de la Bourdonnaye	Table tennis	Men's team, classes 9-10
Bronze	Marie-Christine Fillou; Stéphanie Mariage; Fanny Bertrand; Isabelle Lafaye	Table tennis	Women's team, classes 1-5
Bronze	Thu Kamkasomphou; Claire Mairie; Audrey le Morvan; Anne Barneoud	Table tennis	Women's team, classes 6-10
Bronze	Jean-Pierre Talatini	Athletics	Men's javelin throw F33/34/52
Bronze	Trésor Makunda; Pasquale Gallo; Stéphane Bozzolo; Ronan Pallier	Athletics	Men's 4 × 100 m relay T11-13
Bronze	Christophe Durand; Emeric Martin; Maxime Thomas	Table tennis	men's team, classes 4/5
Bronze	Julien Casoli; Pierre Fairbank; Alain Fuss; Denis Lemeunier	Athletics	men's 4 × 400 m relay, T53/54
Bronze	Nantenin Keita	Athletics	Women's 400m T13

== Sports ==
=== Archery ===
==== Men ====
Athlete	Event	Ranking round		Round of 32	Round of 16	Quarterfinals	Semifinals	Finals	
Athlete	Event	Score	Seed	Opposition score	Opposition score	Opposition score	Opposition score	Opposition score	Rank
Maurice Champey	Men's individual compound open	674	12	Bye	Horner (SUI); L 109-113	Did not advance			
Olivier Hatem	Men's individual compound W1	616	7	—	Azzolini (ITA); L 101-107	Did not advance			
Fabrice Meunier	Men's individual recurve standing	597	13	Haraguchi (JPN); W 109-83	Cho (KOR); W 101-96	Inkaew (THA); W 103-99	Esposito (ITA); W 95-91	Baatarjav (MGL); L 90-94	2nd place, silver medalist(s)
Stephane Gilbert	Men's individual recurve W1/W2	602	13	Naganuma (JPN); W 93-80	de Pellegrin (ITA); W 101-99	Cheng C (CHN); L 95-99	Did not advance		

==== Women ====
Athlete	Event	Ranking round		Round of 32	Round of 16	Quarterfinals	Semifinals	Finals	
Athlete	Event	Score	Seed	Opposition score	Opposition score	Opposition score	Opposition score	Opposition score	Rank
Brigitte Duboc	Women's individual recurve standing	572	3	Bye	Nikitenko (UKR); W 99-78	Olejnik (POL); L 88-101	Did not advance		
Lelia Maufras du Chatelliet	Women's individual recurve W1/W2	557	6	Bye	Mijno (ITA); W 98-94	Nakanishi (JPN); L 84-90	Did not advance		

=== Athletics ===
==== Men's track ====
Athlete	Class	Event	Heats		Semifinal		Final	
Athlete	Class	Event	Result	Rank	Result	Rank	Result	Rank
Arnaud Assoumani	T46	100m	11.07	1 Q	—		11.34	5
Arnaud Assoumani	T46	200m	22.81	5 Q	—		22.56	6
Aladji Ba	T11	400m	54.98	9	Did not advance			
Julien Casoli	T54	800m	1:40.13	11 Q	1:35.11	4 q	1:37.56	6
Julien Casoli	T54	1500m	3:14.33	20 Q	3:09.11	5 Q	DNF	
Pierre Fairbank	T53	200m	28.27	8 Q	—		27.94	8
Pierre Fairbank	T53	400m	51.76	2 Q	—		50.40	6
Pierre Fairbank	T53	800m	1:41.67	11	Did not advance			
Alain Fuss	T54	1500m	DNF q		3:02.71	11	Did not advance	
Alain Fuss	T54	5000m	10:53.54	22	Did not advance			
Alain Fuss	T54	Marathon	—				1:30:30	18
Pasquale Gallo	T12	100m	11.72	20	Did not advance			
Pasquale Gallo	T12	200m	23.64	17	Did not advance			
Clavel Kayitaré	T42	100m	—				DSQ	
Denis Lemeunier	T54	1500m	3:18.11	25 Q	3:01.95	4 q	3:16.43	5
Denis Lemeunier	T54	5000m	10:24.05	15	Did not advance			
Denis Lemeunier	T54	Marathon	—				DNF	
Trésor Makunda	T11	100m	11.48	3 Q	11.51	3 Q	11.46	3rd place, bronze medalist(s)
Trésor Makunda	T11	200m	23.84	7 q	23.34	6 B	25.55	3
Trésor Makunda	T11	400m	52.89	6 q	51.99	5	Did not advance	
Djamel Mastouri	T37	800m	—				2:03.04	3rd place, bronze medalist(s)
Serge Ornem	T46	200m	23.36	11	Did not advance			
Hugues Quiatol	T35	100m	—				14.12	8
Stéphane Bozzolo; Pasquale Gallo; Trésor Makunda; Ronan Pallier	T11–13	4 × 100 m relay	44.54	2 Q	—		44.49	3rd place, bronze medalist(s)
Arnaud Assoumani; Clavel Kayitaré; Xavier le Draoullec; Serge Ornem	T42–46	4 × 100 m relay	—				46.68	4
Julien Casoli; Pierre Fairbank; Alain Fuss; Denis Lemeunier	T53–54	4 × 400 m relay	3:20.11	4 Q	—		3:17.93	3rd place, bronze medalist(s)

==== Men's field ====
Athlete	Class	Event	Final		
Athlete	Class	Event	Result	Points	Rank
Arnaud Assoumani	F46	Long jump	7.23 WR	-	1st place, gold medalist(s)
Stéphane Bozzolo	F12	Long jump	6.53	-	7
Stéphane Bozzolo	P12	Pentathlon	3111		4
Thierry Cibone	F35–36	Discus throw	41.22	861	9
Thierry Cibone	F35–36	Shot put	14.03 SB	971	5
Tony Falelavaki	F42/44	Javelin throw	48.75	895	11
Tony Falelavaki	F44	Shot put	12.47	778	8
Xavier le Draoullec	F42/44	Long jump	NM		
Ronan Pallier	F12	Long jump	6.66	-	6
Antoine Perel	F12	Long jump	6.37	-	9
Antoine Perel	P12	Pentathlon	2834		2834
Pasilione Tafilagi	F57–58	Discus throw	50.93 SB	954	5
Pasilione Tafilagi	F57–58	Shot put	12.49	835	14
Jean-Pierre Talatini	F33–34/52	Javelin throw	31.19	1169	3rd place, bronze medalist(s)
Jean-Pierre Talatini	F33–34/52	Shot put	11.04	1021	4

==== Women's track ====
Athlete	Class	Event	Heats		Semifinal		Final	
Athlete	Class	Event	Result	Rank	Result	Rank	Result	Rank
Melanie Barthe	T37	100m	15.53	14	Did not advance			
Assia El'Hannouni	T12	200m	25.58	2 Q	25.27	1 Q	24.84 WR	1st place, gold medalist(s)
Assia El'Hannouni	T12	400m	55.41	1 Q	—		55.06	1st place, gold medalist(s)
Assia El'Hannouni	T12-13	800m	2:09.21	1 Q	—		2:04.96	2nd place, silver medalist(s)
Assia El'Hannouni	T13	1500m	—				4:19.20	2nd place, silver medalist(s)
Nantenin Keita	T13	100m	12.61	3 Q	—		12.57	4
Nantenin Keita	T13	400m	57.71	4 Q	—		56.28	3rd place, bronze medalist(s)
Marie-Amélie le Fur	T44	100m	13.82	4 Q	—		13.73	2nd place, silver medalist(s)
Marie-Amélie le Fur	T44	200m	—				31.09	8

==== Women's field ====
Athlete	Class	Event	Final		
Athlete	Class	Event	Result	Points	Rank
Melanie Barthe	F37–38	Shot put	9.67	943	9
Nantenin Keita	F13	Long jump	5.49	-	4
Marie-Amélie Le Fur	F44	Long jump	4.71	-	2nd place, silver medalist(s)
Patricia Marquis	F40	Discus throw	17.84 SB	-	8
Patricia Marquis	F40	Shot put	5.51	-	11

=== Cycling ===
==== Men's road ====
Athlete	Event	Time	Rank
Stephane Bahier	Men's road race LC3/LC4/CP3	1:38:01	7
Stephane Bahier	Men's road time trial LC3	39:13.55	6
Yvon Buchmann	Men's road time trial HC A	37:51.29	5
David Mercier	Men's road race LC1/LC2/CP4	1:46:03	2nd place, silver medalist(s)
David Mercier	Men's road time trial LC1	36:13.31	7
Alain Quittet	Men's road time trial HC A	31:17.72	3rd place, bronze medalist(s)
Damien Severi	Men's road race LC1/LC2/CP4	1:47:05	15
Damien Severi	Men's road time trial LC1	38:32.86	13
Laurent Thirionet	Men's road race LC3/LC4/CP3	1:38:01	6
Laurent Thirionet	Men's road time trial LC3	38:00.31	1st place, gold medalist(s)
Olivier Donval; John Saccomondi (pilot)	Men's road race B&VI 1–3	2:14:49	3rd place, bronze medalist(s)

==== Men's track ====
Athlete	Event	Qualification		1st round		Final	
Athlete	Event	Time	Rank	Time	Rank	Opposition Time	Rank
Stephane Bahier	Men's individual pursuit LC3	4:12.02	9	Did not advance			
Stephane Bahier	Men's time trial LC3–4	—				1:22.5	11
Maurice Eckhard	Men's individual pursuit CP3	4:09.119	4 q	—		Quevillon (CAN); L 4:08.430	4
David Mercier	Men's individual pursuit LC1	5:08.64	10	Did not advance			
Damien Severi	Men's individual pursuit LC1	5:10.59	11	Did not advance			
Damien Severi	Men's time trial LC1	—				1:17.22	13
Laurent Thirionet	Men's individual pursuit LC3	3:57.23	4 q	—		Graf (GER); L 3:55.54	4
Laurent Thirionet	Men's time trial LC3-4	—				1:20.6	8
Olivier Donval; John Saccamondi (pilot)	Men's individual pursuit B&VI 1–3	4:44.890	11	Did not advance			
Olivier Donval; John Saccamondi (pilot)	Men's time trial B&VI 1-3	—				1:10.667	14

==== Women's road ====
Athlete	Event	Time	Rank
Catherine Martin	Women's road race HC A/B/C	1:17:14	7
Catherine Martin	Women's road time trial HC A/HC B/HC C	27:14.60	10

=== Equestrian ===
Athlete	Horse	Event	Total	
Athlete	Horse	Event	Score	Rank
Nathalie Bizet	Mephisto	Mixed individual championship test grade IV	66.387	5
Nathalie Bizet	Mephisto	Mixed individual freestyle test grade Ib	68.453	5
Celine Gerny	Jeudi D'Avril	Mixed individual championship test grade Ib	61.524	10
Celine Gerny	Jeudi D'Avril	Mixed individual freestyle test grade Ib	61.666	11

=== Judo ===
==== Men ====
Athlete	Event	First round	Quarterfinals	Semifinals	Repechage round 1	Repechage round 2	Final/ Bronze medal contest
Athlete	Event	Opposition Result	Opposition Result	Opposition Result	Opposition Result	Opposition Result	Opposition Result
Olivier Cugnon de Servicourt	Men's 90kg	Ingram (GBR); W 0021-0011	Hatsuse (JPN); W 0010-0001	Mammadov (AZE); L 0001-1100	—		Shevchenko (RUS); W 0002-0001 (bronze)
Cyril Jonard	Men's 81kg	Mirhassan Nattaj (IRI); W 1001-0000	Vincze (HUN); W 1100–0001	Carvallo (VEN); W 1010-0000	—		Cruz (CUB); L 0000-0010 (silver)
Gerald Rollo	Men's 100kg	Cortada (CUB); L 0000-1000	—		Vlasov (RUS); W 0010-0000	Hirose (JPN); L 0010-0100	Did not advance
Julien Taurines	Men's +100kg	Zilian (GER); W 1000-0000	Zakiyev (AZE); L 0000-1000	—	Bye	Moreno (ESP); W 1000-0010	Papp (HUN); W 1000-0000 (bronze)

==== Women ====
Athlete	Event	Quarterfinals	Semifinals	Repechage round 1	Repechage round 2	Final/ Bronze medal contest
Athlete	Event	Opposition Result	Opposition Result	Opposition Result	Opposition Result	Opposition Result
Sandrine Aurieres-Martinet	Women's 52kg	Thi (VIE); W 1000-0000	Stepanyuk (RUS); W 1000-0000	—		Cui (CHN); L 0011-0103 (silver)
Celine Manzuoli	Women's +70kg	Komatsu (JPN); L 0010-1011	—		de Pinies (ESP); L 0000-1030	Did not advance
Karima Medjeded	Women's 48kg	M Gonzalez (CUB); L 0000–0002	—	Akatsuka (JPN); W 0200-0000	Halinska (UKR); L 0010-1010	Did not advance
Angelique Quessandier	Women's 63kg	Arce (ESP); L 0000-0200	—	Teixeira (BRA); W 1001-0100	Aimthisung (THA); W 1000-0000	Kivi (SWE); W 1010-0000 (bronze)

=== Powerlifting ===
==== Men ====
Athlete	Event	Result	Rank
Charly Castel	90kg	190.0	6
David Nard	60kg	140.0	11

==== Women ====
Athlete	Event	Result	Rank
Carine Burgy	82.5kg	127.5	5
Souhad Ghazouani	48kg	112.5	3rd place, bronze medalist(s)

=== Rowing ===
Athlete	Event	Heats		Repechage		Final	
Athlete	Event	Time	Rank	Time	Rank	Time	Rank
Patrick Laureau	Men's single sculls	5:33.39	5 R	6:03.75	5 FB	5:44.29	1

=== Sailing ===
Athlete	Event	Race											Total points	Net points Total	Rank
Athlete	Event	1	2	3	4	5	6	7	8	9	10	11	Total points	Net points Total	Rank
Damien Seguin	2.4mR	4	4	5	4	6	(17); OCS	(11)	1	1	2	—	39	21	2nd place, silver medalist(s)
Bruno Jourdren; Herve Larhant; Nicolas Vimont-Vicary	Sonar	4	1	1	2	7	1	(10)	5	8	7	(15); DNF	61	36	2nd place, silver medalist(s)

=== Shooting ===
==== Men ====
Athlete	Event	Qualification		Final		
Athlete	Event	Score	Rank	Score	Total	Rank
Tanguy de la Forest	Mixed 10m air rifle prone SH2	599	10	Did not advance		
Tanguy de la Forest	Mixed 10m air rifle standing SH2	598	8 Q	103.7	699.7	7
Cedric Friggeri	Men's 10m air rifle standing SH1	587	8 Q	102.6	689.6	7
Cedric Friggeri	Men's 50m rifle 3 positions SH1	1127	12	Did not advance		
Cedric Friggeri	Mixed 10m air rifle prone SH1	598	14	Did not advance		
Bernard Lamoureux	Men's 10m air pistol SH1	561	12	Did not advance		
Bernard Lamoureux	Mixed 25m pistol SH1	546	22	Did not advance		
Bernard Lamoureux	Mixed 50m pistol SH1	513	17	Did not advance		
Didier Richard	Men's 50m rifle 3 positions SH1	1127	11	Did not advance		
Didier Richard	Mixed 10m air rifle prone SH1	594	33	Did not advance		
Didier Richard	Mixed 50m rifle prone SH1	581	24	Did not advance		
Cedric Rio	Mixed 10m air rifle prone SH2	596	17	Did not advance		
Cedric Rio	Mixed 10m air rifle standing SH2	590	17	Did not advance		
Raphael Voltz	Mixed 10m air rifle prone SH2	599	7 Q	106.1	705.1	2nd place, silver medalist(s)
Raphael Voltz	Mixed 10m air rifle standing SH2	598	2 Q	105.5	703.5	2nd place, silver medalist(s)

==== Women ====
Athlete	Event	Qualification		Final		
Athlete	Event	Score	Rank	Score	Total	Rank
Michele Amiel	Women's 10m air rifle standing SH1	386	7 Q	97.8	483.8	8
Michele Amiel	Women's 50m rifle 3 positions SH1	549	11	Did not advance		
Michele Amiel	Mixed 50m rifle prone SH1	569	37	Did not advance		

=== Swimming ===
==== Men ====
Athlete	Class	Event	Heats		Final	
Athlete	Class	Event	Result	Rank	Result	Rank
Yann Bourdier	S10	400m freestyle	4:33.32	12	Did not advance	
Sami El Gueddari	S9	50m freestyle	26.70	6 Q	26.65	7
Sami El Gueddari	S9	100m freestyle	58.72	8 Q	58.68	8
Yann Nouard	S8	100m backstroke	1:17.14	11	Did not advance	
Yann Nouard	S8	400m freestyle	5:16.01	10	Did not advance	
Vincent Rupp	SB9	100m breaststroke	1:14.31	8 Q	1:14.54	7
David Smétanine	S4	50m backstroke	47.39	2 Q	48.66	2nd place, silver medalist(s)
David Smétanine	S4	50m freestyle	37.79	1 Q	37.89	1st place, gold medalist(s)
David Smétanine	S4	100m freestyle	1:23.87	1 Q	1:24.67	1st place, gold medalist(s)
David Smétanine	S4	200m freestyle	3:02.09 PR	2 Q	3:04.47	2nd place, silver medalist(s)
David Smétanine	SM4	150m individual medley	2:54.70	5 Q	2:46.19	5

==== Women ====
Athlete	Class	Event	Heats		Final	
Athlete	Class	Event	Result	Rank	Result	Rank
Maud Didier	S10	100m backstroke	1:20.84	13	Did not advance	
Maud Didier	SB9	100m breaststroke	1:26.17	3 Q	1:26.56	6
Maud Didier	SM10	200m individual medley	2:48.18	8 Q	2:47.62	8
Emilie Gral	S9	100m backstroke	1:16.06	7 Q	1:16.42	8
Emilie Gral	S9	100m butterfly	1:14.50	9	Did not advance	
Emilie Gral	S9	50m freestyle	31.36	11	Did not advance	
Emilie Gral	S9	100m freestyle	1:07.36	14	Did not advance	
Emilie Gral	SM9	200m individual medley	2:44.82	6 Q	2:42.48	5
Florence Lancial	SB5	100m breaststroke	1:54.99	3 Q	1:56.73	5
Florence Lancial	SM6	200m individual medley	3:54.35	11	Did not advance	
Rachel Lardiere	SB5	100m breaststroke	1:53.90	2 Q	1:52.34	2nd place, silver medalist(s)
Élodie Lorandi	S10	100m backstroke	1:18.05	10	Did not advance	
Élodie Lorandi	S10	100m butterfly	1:11.34	3 Q	1:12.03	4
Élodie Lorandi	S10	50m freestyle	29.87	6 Q	29.59	6
Élodie Lorandi	S10	400m freestyle	4:51.46	5 Q	4:48.47	6
Élodie Lorandi	SM10	200m individual medley	2:40.73	2 Q	2:39.28	2nd place, silver medalist(s)
Genevieve Pairoux-Lagardere	S5	50m backstroke	1:02.65	12	Did not advance	
Genevieve Pairoux-Lagardere	S5	50m freestyle	45.83	10	Did not advance	
Genevieve Pairoux-Lagardere	S5	100m freestyle	1:42.80	10	Did not advance	
Genevieve Pairoux-Lagardere	S5	200m freestyle	3:31.97	8 Q	3:34.02	8
Eztitxu Vivanco	S9	100m backstroke	1:17.28	10	Did not advance	
Eztitxu Vivanco	S9	50m freestyle	32.45	15	Did not advance	
Eztitxu Vivanco	S9	100m freestyle	1:09.81	19	Did not advance	

=== Table tennis ===
==== Men's singles ====
Athlete	Event	Preliminaries				Round of 16	Quarterfinals	Semifinals	Final / BM	
Athlete	Event	Opposition Result	Opposition Result	Opposition Result	Rank	Opposition Result	Opposition Result	Opposition Result	Opposition Result	Rank
Vincent Boury	Men's singles C2	Espindola (BRA); L 1-3	Ruep (AUT); W 3-0	Vella (ITA); W 3-2	1 Q	—		Kim K M (KOR); W 3-1	Molliens (FRA); W 3-0	1st place, gold medalist(s)
Gilles de la Bourdonnaye	Men's singles C9–10	Lukyanov (RUS); W 3-0	Manso (CUB); W 3-0	—	1 Q	Bye	Ge (CHN); L 0-3	Did not advance		
Jean-François Ducay	Men's singles C1	Lee H K (KOR); L 2-3	Nikelis (GER); W 3-2	Trujillo (CUB); W 2–0	2 Q	—		Cho J K (KOR); L 1-3	Lee H K (KOR); L 1-3	4
Christophe Durand	Men's singles C4–5	Bai (CHN); W 3-2	Sule (NGR); W 3-0	—	1 Q	Choi K S (KOR); W 3-1	Mihalik (SVK); W 3-0	Urhaug (NOR); W 3-2	Jung E C (KOR); W 3-2	1st place, gold medalist(s)
Yann Guilhem	Men's singles C3	Robinson (GBR); L 1-3	Abuajela (LBA); W 3-0	—	2	Did not advance				
Emeric Martin	Men's singles C4–5	Oka (JPN); W 3-0	Kwong K S (HKG); W 3-1	—	1 Q	Bye	Jung E C (KOR); L 2–3	Did not advance		
Damien Mennella	Men's singles C2	Kim K M (KOR); L 2–3	Riapos (SVK); L 0–3	Gao Y (CHN); W 3–1	3	Did not advance				
Florian Merrien	Men's singles C3	Jeyoung (KOR); W 3–0	Lukezic (SLO); W 3–0	—	1 Q	Bye	Algacir Silva (BRA); L 0-3	Did not advance		
Stephane Messi	Men's singles C7	Seidenfeld (USA); L 0-3	Jurasz (POL); W 3–0	J du Plooy (RSA); W 3–0	2	Did not advance				
Stephane Molliens	Men's singles C2	Poddubnyy (RUS); W 3-0	Kim K Y (KOR); W 3-1	Ahmed (LBA); W 3-0	1 Q	—		L Hansen (DEN); W 3-1	Boury (FRA); L 0-3	2nd place, silver medalist(s)
Alain Pichon	Men's singles C8	Grudzien (POL); L 1-3	Loicq (BEL); L 1-3	Hu M F (TPE); W 3-2	4	Did not advance				
Jean-Philippe Robin	Men's singles C3	Kosco (SVK); W 3-0	Quijada (VEN); W 3-0	—	1 Q	Geva (ISR); W 3-0	Kesler (SRB); W 3-2	Piñas (ESP); W 3-0	Feng (CHN); L 0-3	2nd place, silver medalist(s)
Jeremy Rousseau	Men's singles C9-10	Ge (CHN); L 0-3	Zborai (HUN); W 3-2	—	2	Did not advance				
Christophe Rozier	Men's singles C9–10	Ruiz (ESP); L 0-3	Korn (GER); W 3-1	—	2	Did not advance				
François Serignat	Men's singles C8	Li M (CHN); L 1-3	Csejtey (SVK); W 3-2	Hou T S (TPE); W 3-2	3	Did not advance				
Maxime Thomas	Men's singles C4–5	Saleh (EGY); L 1-3	D Rodriguez (ARG); W 3-0	—	2	Did not advance				

==== Women's singles ====
Athlete	Event	Preliminaries				Semifinals	Final / BM	
Athlete	Event	Opposition Result	Opposition Result	Opposition Result	Rank	Opposition Result	Opposition Result	Rank
Anne Barneoud	Women's singles C6–7	Martyasheva (RUS); L 0-3	Khodzynska (UKR); L 0-3	—	3	Did not advance		
Fanny Bertrand	Women's singles C3	Pintar (SLO); L 2-3	Mader (AUT); L 0-3	Cudia (ITA); W 3-0	3	Did not advance		
Genevieve Clot	Women's singles C1–2	Podda (ITA); L 1-3	Neil (GBR); W 3–0	—	2	Did not advance		
Marie-Christine Fillou	Women's singles C3	Brunelli (ITA); L 0-3	Ahlquist (SWE); W 3-2	Moll (RSA); W 3-0	3	Did not advance		
Thu Kamkasomphou	Women's singles C8	Abrahamsson (SWE); W 3-0	Barbusova (SVK); W 3-0	Janeckova (CZE); W 3-0	1 Q	Mairie (FRA); W 3-1	Abrahamsson (SWE); W 3-0	1st place, gold medalist(s)
Isabelle Lafaye	Women's singles C1–2	Khazaei (IRI); W 3-1	Bargouthi (JOR); W 3-1	—	1 Q	Pezzutto (ITA); L 2-3	Podda (ITA); L 1-3	4
Audrey le Morvan	Women's singles C10	Partyka (POL); L 0-3	Hou C (CHN); L 1-3	Li Yuq (CHN); W 3-2	4	Did not advance		
Claire Mairie	Women's singles C8	Zhang X (CHN); L 1-3	Bengtsson (SWE); W 3-0	J Rodrigues (BRA); W 3-0	2 Q	Kamkasomphou (FRA); L 1-3	Zhang X (CHN); L 0-3	4
Stephanie Mariage	Women's singles C3	Kanova (SVK); L 0-3	Bakhtiary (IRI); W 3-2	Ploner (ITA); L 2-3	3	Did not advance		
Florence Sireau-Gossiaux	Women's singles C1–2	Liu J (CHN); L 0-3	Mitton (GBR); L 1-3	—	3	Did not advance		

==== Men's teams ====
Athlete	Event	Quarterfinals	Semifinals	Final / BM	
Athlete	Event	Opposition Result	Opposition Result	Opposition Result	Rank
Vincent Boury; Jean-François-Ducay; Damien Mennella; Stephane Molliens	Men's team C1-2	Germany (GER); W 3–0	Austria (AUT); W 3-1	Slovakia (SVK); L 0-3	2nd place, silver medalist(s)
Yann Guilhem; Florian Merrien; Jean-Philippe Robin	Men's team C3	Slovenia (SLO); W 3-0	Great Britain (GBR); W 3-0	Brazil (BRA); W 3-1	1st place, gold medalist(s)
Christophe Durand; Emeric Martin; Maxime Thomas	Men's team C4–5	Germany (GER); W 3-0	South Korea (KOR); L 2-3	Norway (NOR); W 3-0	3rd place, bronze medalist(s)
Stephane Messi; Alain Pichon; François Serignat	Men's team C6–8	Poland (POL); W 3-1	Slovakia (SVK); L 1-3	Israel (ISR); W 3-2	3rd place, bronze medalist(s)
Gilles de la Bourdonnaye; Jeremy Rousseau; Christophe Rozier	Men's team C9–10	Hungary (HUN); W 3-1	China (CHN); L 0-3	Czech Republic (CZE); W 3-1	3rd place, bronze medalist(s)

==== Women's teams ====
Athlete	Event	Quarterfinals	Semifinals	Final / BM	
Athlete	Event	Opposition Result	Opposition Result	Opposition Result	Rank
Fanny Bertrand; Marie-Christine Fillou; Isabelle Lafaye; Stephanie Mariage	Women's team C1–3	Ireland (IRL); W 3-1	China (CHN); L 1-3	Great Britain (GBR); W 3-0	3rd place, bronze medalist(s)
Anne Barneoud; Thu Kamkasomphou; Audrey le Morvan; Claire Mairie	Women's team C6–10	Brazil (BRA); W 3-0	China (CHN); L 0-3	Russia (RUS); W 3-0	3rd place, bronze medalist(s)

=== Wheelchair fencing ===
==== Men ====
Athlete	Event	Qualification			Round of 16	Quarterfinal	Semifinal	Final / BM	
Athlete	Event	Opposition	Score	Rank	Opposition Score	Opposition Score	Opposition Score	Opposition Score	Rank
Robert Citerne	Men's épée A	Zhang L (CHN)	L 3–5	2 Q	Pender (POL); W 15–13	Tian (CHN); L 12-15	Did not advance		
Robert Citerne	Men's épée A	Pender (POL)	W 5-2	2 Q	Pender (POL); W 15–13	Tian (CHN); L 12-15	Did not advance		
Robert Citerne	Men's épée A	Bazhukov (UKR)	L 4-5	2 Q	Pender (POL); W 15–13	Tian (CHN); L 12-15	Did not advance		
Robert Citerne	Men's épée A	Granell (ESP)	W 5-2	2 Q	Pender (POL); W 15–13	Tian (CHN); L 12-15	Did not advance		
Robert Citerne	Men's épée A	Andree (GER)	W 5-1	2 Q	Pender (POL); W 15–13	Tian (CHN); L 12-15	Did not advance		
Robert Citerne	Men's sabre A	Ye R (CHN)	L 0-5	4 Q	Chan W K (HKG); L 13-15	Did not advance			
Robert Citerne	Men's sabre A	Stanczuk (POL)	L 3-5	4 Q	Chan W K (HKG); L 13-15	Did not advance			
Robert Citerne	Men's sabre A	Mato (HUN)	W 5-2	4 Q	Chan W K (HKG); L 13-15	Did not advance			
Robert Citerne	Men's sabre A	Andreev (RUS)	L 4-5	4 Q	Chan W K (HKG); L 13-15	Did not advance			
Robert Citerne	Men's sabre A	Alexakis (GRE)	W 5-1	4 Q	Chan W K (HKG); L 13-15	Did not advance			
Marc-Andre Cratere	Men's épée B	Rodgers (USA)	L 3-5	1 Q	Bye	Kim G H (KOR); W 15-13	Bezyazychny (BLR); L 6-15	Shenkevych (UKR); L 12-15	4
Marc-Andre Cratere	Men's épée B	Mainville (CAN)	W 5-1	1 Q	Bye	Kim G H (KOR); W 15-13	Bezyazychny (BLR); L 6-15	Shenkevych (UKR); L 12-15	4
Marc-Andre Cratere	Men's épée B	Hu D (CHN)	W 5-3	1 Q	Bye	Kim G H (KOR); W 15-13	Bezyazychny (BLR); L 6-15	Shenkevych (UKR); L 12-15	4
Marc-Andre Cratere	Men's épée B	Soler (ESP)	W 5-2	1 Q	Bye	Kim G H (KOR); W 15-13	Bezyazychny (BLR); L 6-15	Shenkevych (UKR); L 12-15	4
Marc-Andre Cratere	Men's épée B	Hisakawa (JPN)	W 5-1	1 Q	Bye	Kim G H (KOR); W 15-13	Bezyazychny (BLR); L 6-15	Shenkevych (UKR); L 12-15	4
Marc-Andre Cratere	Men's sabre B	Bogdos (GRE)	W 5-4	1 Q	Bye	Sarri (ITA); W 15-13	Hui C H (HKG); L 14-15	Shenkevych (UKR); L 8-15	4
Marc-Andre Cratere	Men's sabre B	Datsko (UKR)	W 5-1	1 Q	Bye	Sarri (ITA); W 15-13	Hui C H (HKG); L 14-15	Shenkevych (UKR); L 8-15	4
Marc-Andre Cratere	Men's sabre B	Sarri (ITA)	W 5-4	1 Q	Bye	Sarri (ITA); W 15-13	Hui C H (HKG); L 14-15	Shenkevych (UKR); L 8-15	4
Marc-Andre Cratere	Men's sabre B	Czop (POL)	W 5-3	1 Q	Bye	Sarri (ITA); W 15-13	Hui C H (HKG); L 14-15	Shenkevych (UKR); L 8-15	4
Marc-Andre Cratere	Men's sabre B	B Williams (USA)	W 5-2	1 Q	Bye	Sarri (ITA); W 15-13	Hui C H (HKG); L 14-15	Shenkevych (UKR); L 8-15	4
Laurent François	Men's foil B	Czop (POL)	W 5-2	1 Q	Bye	Datsko (UKR); W 15-10	Komar (UKR); W 15-8	Hu D (CHN); L 8-15	2nd place, silver medalist(s)
Laurent François	Men's foil B	Datsko (UKR)	W 5-0	1 Q	Bye	Datsko (UKR); W 15-10	Komar (UKR); W 15-8	Hu D (CHN); L 8-15	2nd place, silver medalist(s)
Laurent François	Men's foil B	Rodgers (USA)	W 5-2	1 Q	Bye	Datsko (UKR); W 15-10	Komar (UKR); W 15-8	Hu D (CHN); L 8-15	2nd place, silver medalist(s)
Laurent François	Men's foil B	Alsaedi (KUW)	W 5-3	1 Q	Bye	Datsko (UKR); W 15-10	Komar (UKR); W 15-8	Hu D (CHN); L 8-15	2nd place, silver medalist(s)
Laurent François	Men's foil B	Fawcett (GBR)	W 5-1	1 Q	Bye	Datsko (UKR); W 15-10	Komar (UKR); W 15-8	Hu D (CHN); L 8-15	2nd place, silver medalist(s)
Laurent François	Men's sabre B	Shenkevych (UKR)	W 5-3	1 Q	Bye	Yusupov (RUS); W 15-9	Shenkevych (UKR); W 15-8	Hui C H (HKG); W 15-9	1st place, gold medalist(s)
Laurent François	Men's sabre B	Szekeres (HUN)	W 5-3	1 Q	Bye	Yusupov (RUS); W 15-9	Shenkevych (UKR); W 15-8	Hui C H (HKG); W 15-9	1st place, gold medalist(s)
Laurent François	Men's sabre B	Fawcett (GBR)	W 5-0	1 Q	Bye	Yusupov (RUS); W 15-9	Shenkevych (UKR); W 15-8	Hui C H (HKG); W 15-9	1st place, gold medalist(s)
Laurent François	Men's sabre B	Arnau (ESP)	W 5-3	1 Q	Bye	Yusupov (RUS); W 15-9	Shenkevych (UKR); W 15-8	Hui C H (HKG); W 15-9	1st place, gold medalist(s)
Laurent François	Men's sabre B	Mainville (CAN)	W 5-1	1 Q	Bye	Yusupov (RUS); W 15-9	Shenkevych (UKR); W 15-8	Hui C H (HKG); W 15-9	1st place, gold medalist(s)
Alim Latreche	Men's épée B	Komar (UKR)	W 5-3	2 Q	Mari (ITA); W 15-10	Shenkevych (UKR); L 13-15	Did not advance		
Alim Latreche	Men's épée B	Poleshchuk (RUS)	L 1-5	2 Q	Mari (ITA); W 15-10	Shenkevych (UKR); L 13-15	Did not advance		
Alim Latreche	Men's épée B	Bogdos (GRE)	W 5-3	2 Q	Mari (ITA); W 15-10	Shenkevych (UKR); L 13-15	Did not advance		
Alim Latreche	Men's épée B	Williams (USA)	W 5-3	2 Q	Mari (ITA); W 15-10	Shenkevych (UKR); L 13-15	Did not advance		
Alim Latreche	Men's épée B	Alsaedi (KUW)	W 5-2	2 Q	Mari (ITA); W 15-10	Shenkevych (UKR); L 13-15	Did not advance		
Alim Latreche	Men's foil B	Sarri (ITA)	W 5-4	2 Q	Yusupov (RUS); W 15-8	Komar (UKR); L 14-15	Did not advance		
Alim Latreche	Men's foil B	Wyganowski (POL)	L 4-5	2 Q	Yusupov (RUS); W 15-8	Komar (UKR); L 14-15	Did not advance		
Alim Latreche	Men's foil B	Hisakawa (JPN)	W 5-3	2 Q	Yusupov (RUS); W 15-8	Komar (UKR); L 14-15	Did not advance		
Alim Latreche	Men's foil B	Yusupov (RUS)	W 5-2	2 Q	Yusupov (RUS); W 15-8	Komar (UKR); L 14-15	Did not advance		
Alim Latreche	Men's foil B	Bezyazychny (BLR)	W 5-4	2 Q	Yusupov (RUS); W 15-8	Komar (UKR); L 14-15	Did not advance		
David Maillard	Men's épée A	Pylarinos Markantonatos (GRE)	L 4-5	1 Q	Alqallaf (KUW); W 15-7	Bazhukov (UKR); W 15-14	Zhang L (CHN); L 10-15	Stanczuk (POL); L 12-15	4
David Maillard	Men's épée A	Alhaddad (KUW)	W 5-4	1 Q	Alqallaf (KUW); W 15-7	Bazhukov (UKR); W 15-14	Zhang L (CHN); L 10-15	Stanczuk (POL); L 12-15	4
David Maillard	Men's épée A	Davydenko (UKR)	W 5-4	1 Q	Alqallaf (KUW); W 15-7	Bazhukov (UKR); W 15-14	Zhang L (CHN); L 10-15	Stanczuk (POL); L 12-15	4
David Maillard	Men's épée A	Saengsawang (THA)	W 5-4	1 Q	Alqallaf (KUW); W 15-7	Bazhukov (UKR); W 15-14	Zhang L (CHN); L 10-15	Stanczuk (POL); L 12-15	4
David Maillard	Men's épée A	L Sanchez (ESP)	W 5-3	1 Q	Alqallaf (KUW); W 15-7	Bazhukov (UKR); W 15-14	Zhang L (CHN); L 10-15	Stanczuk (POL); L 12-15	4
David Maillard	Men's épée A	Serafini (ITA)	W 5-2	1 Q	Alqallaf (KUW); W 15-7	Bazhukov (UKR); W 15-14	Zhang L (CHN); L 10-15	Stanczuk (POL); L 12-15	4
David Maillard	Men's foil A	Pender (POL)	L 4-5	3 Q	Horvath (HUN); W 15-3	Zhang L (CHN); L 3-15	Did not advance		
David Maillard	Men's foil A	Pellegrini (ITA)	L 1-5	3 Q	Horvath (HUN); W 15-3	Zhang L (CHN); L 3-15	Did not advance		
David Maillard	Men's foil A	Mato (HUN)	W 5-2	3 Q	Horvath (HUN); W 15-3	Zhang L (CHN); L 3-15	Did not advance		
David Maillard	Men's foil A	Alhaddad (KUW)	W 5-1	3 Q	Horvath (HUN); W 15-3	Zhang L (CHN); L 3-15	Did not advance		
David Maillard	Men's foil A	Andreev (RUS)	L 4-5	3 Q	Horvath (HUN); W 15-3	Zhang L (CHN); L 3-15	Did not advance		
Cyril More	Men's sabre A	Pellegrini (ITA)	W 5-1	2 Q	Davydenko (UKR); L 13-15	Did not advance			
Cyril More	Men's sabre A	Makowski (POL)	L 2-5	2 Q	Davydenko (UKR); L 13-15	Did not advance			
Cyril More	Men's sabre A	Calhoun (USA)	W 5-2	2 Q	Davydenko (UKR); L 13-15	Did not advance			
Cyril More	Men's sabre A	Frolov (RUS)	W 5-1	2 Q	Davydenko (UKR); L 13-15	Did not advance			
Cyril More	Men's sabre A	L Sanchez (ESP)	W 5-3	2 Q	Davydenko (UKR); L 13-15	Did not advance			
Cyril More	Men's sabre A	Altabbakh (KUW)	W 5-3	2 Q	Davydenko (UKR); L 13-15	Did not advance			

==== Women ====
Athlete	Event	Qualification			Quarterfinal	Semifinal	Final / BM	
Athlete	Event	Opposition	Score	Rank	Opposition Score	Opposition Score	Opposition Score	Rank
Sylvie Magnat	Women's épée B	Vasilyeva (RUS)	L 3-5	3 Q	Vasilyeva (RUS); L 13-15	Did not advance		
Sylvie Magnat	Women's épée B	Yao F (CHN)	L 2-5	3 Q	Vasilyeva (RUS); L 13-15	Did not advance		
Sylvie Magnat	Women's épée B	Vettraino (ITA)	W 5-2	3 Q	Vasilyeva (RUS); L 13-15	Did not advance		
Sylvie Magnat	Women's épée B	Palfi (HUN)	W 5-4	3 Q	Vasilyeva (RUS); L 13-15	Did not advance		
Sylvie Magnat	Women's épée B	Demello (USA)	L 2-5	3 Q	Vasilyeva (RUS); L 13-15	Did not advance		
Sylvie Magnat	Women's foil B	Yao F (CHN)	L 4-5	4 Q	Vasilyeva (RUS); L 9-15	Did not advance		
Sylvie Magnat	Women's foil B	Dani (HUN)	L 3-5	4 Q	Vasilyeva (RUS); L 9-15	Did not advance		
Sylvie Magnat	Women's foil B	Lukianenko (UKR)	L 1-5	4 Q	Vasilyeva (RUS); L 9-15	Did not advance		
Sylvie Magnat	Women's foil B	Hassen Bey (ESP)	L 4-5	4 Q	Vasilyeva (RUS); L 9-15	Did not advance		
Sylvie Magnat	Women's foil B	Vettraino (ITA)	W 5-3	4 Q	Vasilyeva (RUS); L 9-15	Did not advance		
Patricia Picot	Women's épée A	Zhang C (CHN)	L 1-5	6	Did not advance			
Patricia Picot	Women's épée A	Gorlina (UKR)	L 2-5	6	Did not advance			
Patricia Picot	Women's épée A	Krajnyak (HUN)	L 0-5	6	Did not advance			
Patricia Picot	Women's épée A	Fan P S (HKG)	L 3-5	6	Did not advance			
Patricia Picot	Women's épée A	Trigilia (ITA)	L 2-5	6	Did not advance			
Patricia Picot	Women's foil A	Zhang C (CHN)	L 1-5	4 Q	Poignet (FRA); L 7-15	Did not advance		
Patricia Picot	Women's foil A	Yu C Y (HKG)	L 3-5	4 Q	Poignet (FRA); L 7-15	Did not advance		
Patricia Picot	Women's foil A	Trigilia (ITA)	L 4-5	4 Q	Poignet (FRA); L 7-15	Did not advance		
Patricia Picot	Women's foil A	Halkina (BLR)	W 5-2	4 Q	Poignet (FRA); L 7-15	Did not advance		
Patricia Picot	Women's foil A	Juhasz (HUN)	W 5-3	4 Q	Poignet (FRA); L 7-15	Did not advance		
Sabrina Poignet	Women's épée A	Yu C Y (HKG)	L 4-5	6	Did not advance			
Sabrina Poignet	Women's épée A	Juhasz (HUN)	L 4-5	6	Did not advance			
Sabrina Poignet	Women's épée A	Witos-Eze (POL)	L 4-5	6	Did not advance			
Sabrina Poignet	Women's épée A	Halkina (BLR)	W 5-4	6	Did not advance			
Sabrina Poignet	Women's épée A	Zhang W (CHN)	L 1-5	6	Did not advance			
Sabrina Poignet	Women's foil A	Fan P S (HKG)	W 5-1	1 Q	Picot (FRA); W 15-7	Yu C Y (HKG); L 6-15	Fan P S (HKG); L 12-15	4
Sabrina Poignet	Women's foil A	Krajnyak (HUN)	W 5-3	1 Q	Picot (FRA); W 15-7	Yu C Y (HKG); L 6-15	Fan P S (HKG); L 12-15	4
Sabrina Poignet	Women's foil A	Zhang X (CHN)	W 5-1	1 Q	Picot (FRA); W 15-7	Yu C Y (HKG); L 6-15	Fan P S (HKG); L 12-15	4
Sabrina Poignet	Women's foil A	Gorlina (UKR)	W 5-0	1 Q	Picot (FRA); W 15-7	Yu C Y (HKG); L 6-15	Fan P S (HKG); L 12-15	4
Sabrina Poignet	Women's foil A	Witos-Eze (POL)	W 5-2	1 Q	Picot (FRA); W 15-7	Yu C Y (HKG); L 6-15	Fan P S (HKG); L 12-15	4

=== Wheelchair tennis ===
==== Men ====
Athlete	Class	Event	Round of 64	Round of 32	Round of 16	Quarterfinals	Semifinals	Finals
Athlete	Class	Event	Opposition Result	Opposition Result	Opposition Result	Opposition Result	Opposition Result	Opposition Result
Stéphane Houdet	Open	Men's singles	Chabrecek (CZE); W 6–2, 6–0	Khulongrua (THA); W 6–1, 6–0	Wikstrom (SWE); W 6–0, 6-3	Vink (NED); L 2–6, 1-6	Did not advance	
Michaël Jérémiasz	Open	Men's singles	Mendez (CHI); W 6–1, 6-0	Gatelli (ITA); W 6–0, 6-2	Gérard (BEL); W 6–4, 6-1	Scheffers (NED); L 3–6, 3-6	Did not advance	
Lahcen Majdi	Open	Men's singles	Lazaridis (GRE); W 6–0, 6-0	Welch (USA); L 1–6, 0-6	Did not advance			
Nicolas Peifer	Open	Men's singles	Kruamai (THA); W 6–2, 6-2	Batycki (POL); W 6–1, 6-3	Olsson (SWE); L 6–7, 0-6	Did not advance		
Stéphane Houdet; Michaël Jérémiasz	Open	Men's doubles	—	Bye	Fujimoto (JPN) / Ikenoya (JPN); W 6–2, 6-2	Lee H G (KOR) / Oh S-h (KOR); W 6–0, 6-0	Scheffers (NED) / Vink (NED); W 6–3, 6-1	Olsson (SWE) / Wikstrom (SWE); W 6–1, 7-6 (gold)
Lahcen Majdi; Nicolas Peifer	Open	Men's doubles	—	Bye	Legner (AUT) / Mossier (AUT); L 3–6, 4-6	Did not advance		

==== Women ====
Athlete	Class	Event	Round of 32	Round of 16	Quarterfinals	Semifinals	Finals
Athlete	Class	Event	Opposition Result	Opposition Result	Opposition Result	Opposition Result	Opposition Result
Florence Gravellier	Open	Women's singles	Tugui (ROU); W 6–0, 6–0	Shuker (GBR); W 2–6, 6–1, 6–4	Walraven (NED); W 6–1, 6-4	Homan (NED); L 4–6, 2–6	Bronze medal match Griffioen (NED); W 6–3, 6-4 (bronze)
Arlette Racineux	Open	Women's singles	Whiley (GBR); W 6–2, 6-4	Dong (CHN); L 0–6, 2-6	Did not advance		
Florence Gravellier; Arlette Racineux	Open	Women's doubles	—	Bye	Domori (JPN) / Ohmae (JPN); W 6–4, 7-5	Homan (NED) / Walraven (NED); L 4–6, 3-6	Bronze medal match Arnoult (USA) / Verfuerth (USA); W 5–7, 6–3, 6–2 (bronze)

== See also ==
- France at the Paralympics
- France at the 2008 Summer Olympics
