= Italy at the 2008 Summer Paralympics =

- IPC code: ITA
- NPC: Comitato Italiano Paralimpico
- Website: www.comitatoparalimpico.it (in Italian)

in Beijing
- Competitors: 86 in 12 sports
- Flag bearer: Francesca Porcellato
- Medals Ranked 28th: Gold 4 Silver 7 Bronze 7 Total 18

Summer Paralympics appearances (overview)
- 1960; 1964; 1968; 1972; 1976; 1980; 1984; 1988; 1992; 1996; 2000; 2004; 2008; 2012; 2016; 2020; 2024

Italy sent a delegation of 86 athletes and 6 guides to compete at the 2008 Summer Paralympics in Beijing. Italian competitors took part in 12 sports: athletics, rowing, cycling, judo, swimming, wheelchair fencing, equestrian, wheelchair tennis, shooting, archery, table tennis and sailing.

== Medallists ==
Medal	Athlete	Sport	Event
Gold	Fabio Triboli	Cycling	Men's road race LC1-2/CP4
Gold	Paolo Viganò	Cycling	Men's individual pursuit LC4
Gold	Paola Protopapa; Luca Agoletto; Daniele Signore; Graziana Saccocci; Alessandro Franzetti (cox)	Rowing	Mixed coxed four
Gold	Maria Poiani Panigati	Swimming	Women's 50m freestyle S11
Silver	Alberto Simonelli	Archery	Men's individual compound open
Silver	Marco Vitale	Archery	Men's individual recurve W1/W2
Silver	Vittorio Podestà	Cycling	Men's time trial HC B
Silver	Cecilia Camellini	Swimming	Women's 50m freestyle S11
Silver	Cecilia Camellini	Swimming	Women's 100m freestyle S11
Silver	Pamela Pezzutto	Table tennis	Women's singles class 1-2
Silver	Michela Brunelli; Federica Cudia; Pamela Pezzutto; Clara Podda	Table tennis	Women's team class 1-3
Bronze	Oscar De Pellegrin; Mario Esposito; Marco Vitale	Archery	Men's team recurve
Bronze	Walter Endrizzi	Athletics	Men's marathon T46
Bronze	Fabio Triboli	Cycling	Men's time trial LC1
Bronze	Fabio Triboli	Cycling	Men's individual pursuit LC1
Bronze	Giorgio Farroni	Cycling	Mixed road race CP1-2
Bronze	Clara Podda	Table tennis	Women's singles class 1-2
Bronze	Alberto Pellegrini	Wheelchair fencing	Men's sabre A

== Sports ==
=== Archery ===
==== Men ====
Athlete	Event	Ranking round		Round of 32	Round of 16	Quarterfinals	Semifinals	Finals	
Athlete	Event	Score	Seed	Opposition score	Opposition score	Opposition score	Opposition score	Opposition score	Rank
Alberto Simonelli	Men's individual compound standing	667	15	Gronberg (SWE); W 112-107	Lee O S (KOR); W 115-112	Klich (CZE); W 111-110	Pemberton (USA); W 116-110	Stubbs (GBR); L 111-116	2nd place, silver medalist(s)
Fabio Luca Azzolini	Men's individual compound W1	593	10	—N/a	Hatem (FRA); W 107-101	Fabry (USA); L 97-113	did not advance		
Mario Esposito	Men's individual recurve standing	631	1	Bye	An (KOR); W 101-98	Zarzuela (ESP); W 102-95	Meunier (FRA); L 91-95	Chen Y (CHN); L 93-98	4
Oscar de Pellegrin	Men's individual recurve W1/W2	629	4	Wolfe (USA); W 107-76	Gilbert (FRA); L 99-101	did not advance			
Antonino Lisotta	Men's individual recurve W1/W2	556	25	Sidik (MAS); L 90-97	did not advance				
Marco Vitale	Men's individual recurve W1/W2	624	7	Chen W Y (TPE); W 104-99	Stone (USA); W 101-97	Sawicki (POL); W 102-98	Tseng L H (TPE); W 103-101	Cheng C (CHN); L 104-108	2nd place, silver medalist(s)
Oscar de Pellegrin; Mario Esposito; Marco Vitale	Men's team recurve	1884	2	—N/a		Thailand (THA); W 206-202	China (CHN); L 201-208	Japan (JPN); W 207-194	3rd place, bronze medalist(s)

==== Women ====
Athlete	Event	Ranking round		Round of 32	Round of 16	Quarterfinals	Semifinals	Finals	
Athlete	Event	Score	Seed	Opposition score	Opposition score	Opposition score	Opposition score	Opposition score	Rank
Elisabetta Mijno	Women's individual recurve W1/W2	519	11	—N/a	Maufras du Chatellier (FRA); L 94-98	did not advance			

=== Athletics ===
==== Men's track ====
Athlete	Class	Event	Heats		Semifinal		Final	
Athlete	Class	Event	Result	Rank	Result	Rank	Result	Rank
Walter Endrizzi	T46	Marathon	—N/a				2:32.51	3rd place, bronze medalist(s)
Samuele Gobbi	T46	200m	23.70	18	did not advance			
Samuele Gobbi	T46	400m	51.60	12	did not advance			
Stefano Lippi	T42	100m	—N/a				13.50	4
Heros Marai	T44	100m	12.05	8 q	—N/a		12.25	7
Heros Marai	T44	200m	24.95	9	did not advance			

==== Men's field ====
Athlete	Class	Event	Final		
Athlete	Class	Event	Result	Points	Rank
Germano Bernardi	F53-54	Discus throw	25.78 SB	937	6
Germano Bernardi	F53-54	Javelin throw	23.23 SB	881	9
Germano Bernardi	F53-54	Shot put	9.46 SB	974	7
Roberto la Barbera	F42/44	Long jump	6.14	949	8
Roberto la Barbera	P44	Pentathlon	DNF		
Stefano Lippi	F42/44	Long jump	5.32	901	10
Heros Marai	F42/44	Long jump	5.78	893	11

==== Women's track ====
Athlete	Class	Event	Heats		Final	
Athlete	Class	Event	Result	Rank	Result	Rank
Giuseppina Gargano	T44	100m	14.68	10	did not advance	
Giuseppina Gargano	T44	200m	—N/a		30.17	6
Francesca Porcellato	T53	100m	17.60	4 Q	17.86	4
Francesca Porcellato	T53	200m	32.20	6 Q	31.61	6
Francesca Porcellato	T53	400m	1:01.05	7 q	58.83	5
Francesca Porcellato	T53	800m	—N/a		2:01.99	5
Francesca Porcellato	T54	Marathon	—N/a		1:54:27	9

=== Cycling ===
==== Men's road ====
Athlete	Event	Time	Rank
Pierpaolo Addesi	Men's road race LC1/LC2/CP4	1:47:18	16
Pierpaolo Addesi	Men's road time trial LC1	36:49.94	10
Giorgio Farroni	Mixed road race	48:34	3rd place, bronze medalist(s)
Giorgio Farroni	Mixed road time trial	24:26.57	6
Fabrizio Macchi	Men's road race LC3/LC4/CP3	DNF	
Fabrizio Macchi	Men's road time trial LC3	39:38.98	7
Vittorio Podestà	Men's road race HC B	1:28:31	5
Vittorio Podestà	Men's road time trial HC B	22:12.06	2nd place, silver medalist(s)
Fabio Triboli	Men's road race LC1/LC2/CP4	1:46:03	1st place, gold medalist(s)
Fabio Triboli	Men's road time trial LC1	35:23.70	3rd place, bronze medalist(s)
Paolo Viganò	Men's road race LC3/LC4/CP3	DNS	
Paolo Viganò	Men's road time trial LC4	DNF	

==== Men's track ====
Athlete	Event	Qualification		Final	
Athlete	Event	Time	Rank	Opposition Time	Rank
Pierpaolo Addesi	Men's individual pursuit LC1	4:58.19	7	did not advance	
Fabrizio Macchi	Men's individual pursuit LC3	4:00.40	5	did not advance	
Fabio Triboli	Men's individual pursuit LC1	4:46.90	3 q	Gohr (BRA); W 4:45.68	3rd place, bronze medalist(s)
Paolo Viganò	Men's individual pursuit LC4	3:59.74 WR	1 Q	4:02.78	1st place, gold medalist(s)
Paolo Viganò	Men's time trial LC3-4	—N/a		1:17.0	4

==== Women's road ====
Athlete	Event	Time	Rank
Silvana Vinci	Women's road time trial LC1/LC2/CP4	47:28.24	8
Cinzia Coluzzi; Melissa Merloni	Women's road race B&VI 1-3	DNF	
Cinzia Coluzzi; Melissa Merloni	Women's road time trial B&VI 1-3	39:36.06	6

==== Women's track ====
Athlete	Event	Qualification		Final	
Athlete	Event	Time	Rank	Opposition Time	Rank
Silvana Vinci	Women's individual pursuit LC1-2/CP4	4:02.148	7	did not advance	
Silvana Vinci	Women's time trial LC1-2/CP4	—N/a		39.9	7

=== Equestrian ===
==== Individual events ====
Athlete	Horse	Event	Total	
Athlete	Horse	Event	Score	Rank
Mauro Caredda	Garfielt	Mixed individual championship test grade Ia	55.800	11
Mauro Caredda	Garfielt	Mixed individual freestyle test grade Ia	62.944	9
Silvia Veratti	Balla Coi Lupi	Mixed individual championship test grade III	64.560	6
Silvia Veratti	Balla Coi Lupi	Mixed individual freestyle test grade III	69.834	5
Andrea Vigon	Priool	Mixed individual championship test grade Ia	63.800	4
Andrea Vigon	Priool	Mixed individual freestyle test grade Ia	69.667	4

==== Team ====
Athlete	Horse	Event	Individual score			Total	
Athlete	Horse	Event	TT	CT	Total	Score	Rank
Mauro Caredda	See above	Team	62.471	59.800	122.271	379.903	8
Silvia Veratti	See above	Team	67.154	64.560	131.714	379.903	8
Andrea Vigon	See above	Team	66.118	63.800	129.918	379.903	8

=== Judo ===
==== Men ====
Athlete	Event	First Round	Quarterfinals	Semifinals	Repechage round 1	Repechage round 2	Final/ Bronze medal contest
Athlete	Event	Opposition Result	Opposition Result	Opposition Result	Opposition Result	Opposition Result	Opposition Result
Matteo Ardit	Men's 81kg	—N/a	Carvallo (VEN); L 0000–0011	—N/a		Pominov (UKR); L 0000-1000	did not advance

=== Rowing ===
Athlete	Event	Heats		Repechage		Final	
Athlete	Event	Time	Rank	Time	Rank	Time	Rank
Simone Miramonti	Men's single sculls	5:44.14	7 R	6:07.65	6 FB	5:45.86	2
Agnese Moro	Women's single sculls	6:26.38	10 R	7:01.36	6 FB	7:01.24	1
Daniele Stefanoni; Stefania Toscano	Mixed double sculls	4:23.36	4 R	4:35.24	2 FA	4:32.30	4
Luca Agoletto; Alessandro Franzetti; Paola Protopapa; Graziana Saccocci; Daniele Signore	Mixed coxed four	3:34.59	1 Q	—N/a		3:33.13	1st place, gold medalist(s)

=== Sailing ===
Athlete	Event	Race											Total points	Net points Total	Rank
Athlete	Event	1	2	3	4	5	6	7	8	9	10	11	Total points	Net points Total	Rank
Fabrizio Olmi	2.4mR	8	9	8	(16)	12	11	13	(16)	3	6	—N/a	102	70	10

=== Shooting ===
==== Men ====
Athlete	Event	Qualification		Final		
Athlete	Event	Score	Rank	Score	Total	Rank
Ivano Borgato	Mixed 50m pistol SH1	500	25	did not advance		
Giancarlo Iori	Men's 10m air pistol SH1	557	17	did not advance		
Giancarlo Iori	Mixed 25m pistol SH1	556	10	did not advance		
Giancarlo Iori	Mixed 50m pistol SH1	511	20	did not advance		
Antonio Martella	Men's 10m air pistol SH1	555	20	did not advance		
Antonio Martella	Mixed 25m pistol SH1	570	5 Q	192.0	762.0	7
Antonio Martella	Mixed 50m pistol SH1	474	29	did not advance		
Oliviero Tiso	Men's 10m air pistol SH1	527	34	did not advance		
Oliviero Tiso	Mixed 25m pistol SH1	551	18	did not advance		

==== Women ====
Athlete	Event	Qualification		Final		
Athlete	Event	Score	Rank	Score	Total	Rank
Azzurra Ciani	Women's 10m air rifle standing SH1	376	18	did not advance		
Azzurra Ciani	Mixed 10m air rifle prone SH1	598	15	did not advance		
Azzurra Ciani	Mixed 50m rifle prone SH1	583	20	did not advance		

=== Swimming ===
==== Men ====
Athlete	Class	Event	Heats		Final	
Athlete	Class	Event	Result	Rank	Result	Rank
Filippo Bonacini	S5	50m butterfly	DSQ		did not advance	
Filippo Bonacini	SB3	50m breaststroke	55.75	4 Q	55.76	5
Filippo Bonacini	SM4	150m individual medley	2:58.06	6 Q	2:53.49	6
Luca Mazzone	S4	50m freestyle	42.47	5 Q	38.60	4
Luca Mazzone	S4	100m freestyle	1:37.23	7 Q	1:31.21	5
Luca Mazzone	S4	200m freestyle	3:36.63	7 Q	3:14.81	5
Efrem Morelli	SB5	100m breaststroke	1:47.88	10	did not advance	
Andrea Palantrani	S13	50m freestyle	26.71	16	did not advance	
Andrea Palantrani	S13	100m freestyle	1:00.12	16	did not advance	
Andrea Palantrani	SB13	100m breaststroke	1:13.33	8 Q	1:12.82	8
Carlo Piccoli	S3	100m freestyle	2:38.72	10	did not advance	
Alessandro Serpico	S12	100m backstroke	1:08.91	9	did not advance	
Alessandro Serpico	S12	100m freestyle	58.47	10	did not advance	
Alessandro Serpico	S12	400m freestyle	4:31.38	4 Q	4:32.03	5

==== Women ====
Athlete	Class	Event	Heats		Final	
Athlete	Class	Event	Result	Rank	Result	Rank
Cecilia Camellini	S11	50m freestyle	33.08	4 Q	31.95	2nd place, silver medalist(s)
Cecilia Camellini	S11	100m freestyle	1:12.74	4 Q	1:09.65	2nd place, silver medalist(s)
Immacolata Cerasuolo	S8	100m butterfly	1:17.50	7 Q	1:17.14	6
Immacolata Cerasuolo	SM8	200m individual medley	2:56.16	5 Q	2:56.24	5
Maria Poiani Panigati	S11	50m freestyle	31.21 WR	1 Q	31.39	1st place, gold medalist(s)
Maria Poiani Panigati	S11	100m freestyle	1:13.22	5 Q	1:12.71	5
Francesca Secci	S9	100m butterfly	1:13.25	6 Q	1:12.81	7
Francesca Secci	S9	100m freestyle	1:09.15	12	did not advance	
Francesca Secci	S9	400m freestyle	5:08.76	10	did not advance	

=== Table tennis ===
==== Men ====
Athlete	Event	Preliminaries				Round of 16	Quarterfinals	Semifinals	Final / BM
Athlete	Event	Opposition Result	Opposition Result	Opposition Result	Rank	Opposition Result	Opposition Result	Opposition Result	Rank
Manfredi Baroncelli	Men's singles C9-10	Andersson (SWE); L 0-3	Cardona (ESP); W 3-1	—N/a	2	did not advance			
Salvatore Caci	Men's singles C4-5	Jung E C (KOR); L 0-3	Tsang T H (HKG); L 2-3	—N/a	3	did not advance			
Andrea Furlan	Men's singles C7	Valera (ESP); L 1-3	Youssef (EGY); W 3-1	Qin X (CHN); W 3-0	4	did not advance			
Nicola Molitierno	Men's singles C3	Kesler (SRB); L 1-3	G Rodriguez (CRC); W 3-1	—N/a	2	did not advance			
Giuseppe Vella	Men's singles C2	Boury (FRA); L 2-3	Espindola (BRA); L 2–3	Ruep (AUT); L 1–3	4	did not advance			
Salvatore Caci; Nicola Molitierno	Men's team C4-5	—N/a				Serbia (SRB); L 2-3	did not advance		
Manfredi Baroncelli; Andrea Furlan	Men's team C9-10	—N/a				Sweden (SWE); L 0-3	did not advance		

==== Women ====
Athlete	Event	Preliminaries				Round of 16	Quarterfinals	Semifinals	Final / BM	
Athlete	Event	Opposition Result	Opposition Result	Opposition Result	Rank	Opposition Result	Opposition Result	Opposition Result	Opposition Result	Rank
Michela Brunelli	Women's singles C3	Ahlquist (SWE); L 1-3	Fillou (FRA); W 3-0	Moll (RSA); W 3-0	1 Q	—N/a		Kanova (SVK); L 1-3	Pintar (SLO); L 0-3	4
Federica Cudia	Women's singles C3	Pintar (SLO); L 0-3	Mader (AUT); L 1-3	Bertrand (FRA); L 0-3	4	did not advance				
Maria Nardelli	Women's singles C5	Abuawad (JOR); L 1-3	Bessho (JPN); L 0-3	Nir Kistler (USA); W 3-1	3	did not advance				
Pamela Pezzutto	Women's singles C1-2	Pushpasheva (RUS); W 3–1	Breathnach (IRL); W 3–1	—N/a	1 Q	—N/a		Lafaye (FRA); W 3–2	Liu J (CHN); L 1-3	2nd place, silver medalist(s)
Christina Ploner	Women's singles C3	Kanova (SVK); L 0-3	Bakhtiary (IRI); L 0-3	Mariage (FRA); W 3-2	4	did not advance				
Clara Podda	Women's singles C1-2	Clot (FRA); W 3-1	Neil (GBR); W 3-2	—N/a	1 Q	—N/a		Liu J (CHN); L 1-3	Lafaye (FRA); W 3-1	3rd place, bronze medalist(s)
Patrizia Sacca	Women's singles C4	Weinmann (GER); L 0-3	Jung J N (KOR); L 1-3	Arenales (MEX); W 3-1	3	did not advance				
Valeria Zorzetto	Women's singles C4	Moon S H (KOR); L 0-3	Obiora (NGR); W 3-1	Robertson (GBR); W 3-1	2	did not advance				
Michela Brunelli; Federica Cudia; Pamela Pezzutto; Clara Podda	Women's team C1-3	—N/a				Bye		Great Britain (GBR); W 3-0	China (CHN); L 1-3	2nd place, silver medalist(s)
Maria Nardelli; Valeria Zorzetto	Women's team C4-5	—N/a				South Korea (KOR); W 3-1	Serbia (SRB); L 1-3	did not advance		

=== Wheelchair fencing ===
==== Men ====
Athlete	Event	Qualification			Round of 16	Quarterfinal	Semifinal	Final / BM	
Athlete	Event	Opposition	Score	Rank	Opposition Score	Opposition Score	Opposition Score	Opposition Score	Rank
Matteo Betti	Men's épée A	Tian (CHN)	L 4-5	3 Q	Markantonatos (GRE); W 15–12	Stanczuk (POL); L 9-15	did not advance		
Matteo Betti	Men's épée A	Wong T T (HKG)	L 4-5	3 Q	Markantonatos (GRE); W 15–12	Stanczuk (POL); L 9-15	did not advance		
Matteo Betti	Men's épée A	Stanczuk (POL)	L 3-5	3 Q	Markantonatos (GRE); W 15–12	Stanczuk (POL); L 9-15	did not advance		
Matteo Betti	Men's épée A	Alqallaf (KUW)	W 5-0	3 Q	Markantonatos (GRE); W 15–12	Stanczuk (POL); L 9-15	did not advance		
Matteo Betti	Men's épée A	Horvath (HUN)	W 5-0	3 Q	Markantonatos (GRE); W 15–12	Stanczuk (POL); L 9-15	did not advance		
Matteo Betti	Men's foil A	Zhang L (CHN)	L 0-5	2 Q	Granell (ESP); W 15-5	Chan W K (HKG); L 14-15	did not advance		
Matteo Betti	Men's foil A	Alqallaf (KUW)	W 5-0	2 Q	Granell (ESP); W 15-5	Chan W K (HKG); L 14-15	did not advance		
Matteo Betti	Men's foil A	Horvath (HUN)	W 5-0	2 Q	Granell (ESP); W 15-5	Chan W K (HKG); L 14-15	did not advance		
Matteo Betti	Men's foil A	Granell (ESP)	W 5-0	2 Q	Granell (ESP); W 15-5	Chan W K (HKG); L 14-15	did not advance		
Matteo Betti	Men's foil A	Saengsawang (THA)	W 5-2	2 Q	Granell (ESP); W 15-5	Chan W K (HKG); L 14-15	did not advance		
Matteo Betti	Men's foil A	Andree (GER)	W 5-2	2 Q	Granell (ESP); W 15-5	Chan W K (HKG); L 14-15	did not advance		
Gerardo Mari	Men's épée B	Shenkevych (UKR)	L 3-5	4 Q	Latreche (FRA); L 10-15	did not advance			
Gerardo Mari	Men's épée B	Bezyazychny (BLR)	W 5-4	4 Q	Latreche (FRA); L 10-15	did not advance			
Gerardo Mari	Men's épée B	Kim G H (KOR)	L 2-5	4 Q	Latreche (FRA); L 10-15	did not advance			
Gerardo Mari	Men's épée B	Baozhong (CHN)	L 4-5	4 Q	Latreche (FRA); L 10-15	did not advance			
Gerardo Mari	Men's épée B	Pluta (POL)	W 5-2	4 Q	Latreche (FRA); L 10-15	did not advance			
Gerardo Mari	Men's sabre B	Hui C H (HKG)	W 5-4	1 Q	Arnau (ESP); W 15-7	Shenkevych (UKR); L 5-15	did not advance		
Gerardo Mari	Men's sabre B	Pluta (POL)	L 3-5	1 Q	Arnau (ESP); W 15-7	Shenkevych (UKR); L 5-15	did not advance		
Gerardo Mari	Men's sabre B	Yusupov (RUS)	W 5-1	1 Q	Arnau (ESP); W 15-7	Shenkevych (UKR); L 5-15	did not advance		
Gerardo Mari	Men's sabre B	Soler (ESP)	W 5-3	1 Q	Arnau (ESP); W 15-7	Shenkevych (UKR); L 5-15	did not advance		
Gerardo Mari	Men's sabre B	Moreno (USA)	W 5-2	1 Q	Arnau (ESP); W 15-7	Shenkevych (UKR); L 5-15	did not advance		
Alberto Pellegrini	Men's foil A	Pender (POL)	L 2-5	2 Q	Makowski (POL); W 15-10	Pender (POL); L 9-15	did not advance		
Alberto Pellegrini	Men's foil A	Maillard (FRA)	W 5-1	2 Q	Makowski (POL); W 15-10	Pender (POL); L 9-15	did not advance		
Alberto Pellegrini	Men's foil A	Mato (HUN)	W 5-1	2 Q	Makowski (POL); W 15-10	Pender (POL); L 9-15	did not advance		
Alberto Pellegrini	Men's foil A	Alhaddad (KUW)	W 5-4	2 Q	Makowski (POL); W 15-10	Pender (POL); L 9-15	did not advance		
Alberto Pellegrini	Men's foil A	Andreev (RUS)	W 5-1	2 Q	Makowski (POL); W 15-10	Pender (POL); L 9-15	did not advance		
Alberto Pellegrini	Men's sabre A	More (FRA)	L 1-5	1 Q	Andreev (RUS); W 15-6	Frolov (RUS); W 15-3	Tian (CHN); L 8-15	Chan W K (HKG); W 15-5	3rd place, bronze medalist(s)
Alberto Pellegrini	Men's sabre A	Makowski (POL)	W 5-4	1 Q	Andreev (RUS); W 15-6	Frolov (RUS); W 15-3	Tian (CHN); L 8-15	Chan W K (HKG); W 15-5	3rd place, bronze medalist(s)
Alberto Pellegrini	Men's sabre A	Calhoun (USA)	W 5-0	1 Q	Andreev (RUS); W 15-6	Frolov (RUS); W 15-3	Tian (CHN); L 8-15	Chan W K (HKG); W 15-5	3rd place, bronze medalist(s)
Alberto Pellegrini	Men's sabre A	Frolov (RUS)	W 5-0	1 Q	Andreev (RUS); W 15-6	Frolov (RUS); W 15-3	Tian (CHN); L 8-15	Chan W K (HKG); W 15-5	3rd place, bronze medalist(s)
Alberto Pellegrini	Men's sabre A	L Sanchez (ESP)	W 5-0	1 Q	Andreev (RUS); W 15-6	Frolov (RUS); W 15-3	Tian (CHN); L 8-15	Chan W K (HKG); W 15-5	3rd place, bronze medalist(s)
Alberto Pellegrini	Men's sabre A	Altabbakh (KUW)	W 5-1	1 Q	Andreev (RUS); W 15-6	Frolov (RUS); W 15-3	Tian (CHN); L 8-15	Chan W K (HKG); W 15-5	3rd place, bronze medalist(s)
Alessio Sarri	Men's foil B	Latreche (FRA)	L 4-5	1 Q	Komar (UKR); L 9-15	did not advance			
Alessio Sarri	Men's foil B	Wyganowski (POL)	W 5-3	1 Q	Komar (UKR); L 9-15	did not advance			
Alessio Sarri	Men's foil B	Hisakawa (JPN)	W 5-3	1 Q	Komar (UKR); L 9-15	did not advance			
Alessio Sarri	Men's foil B	Yusupov (RUS)	W 5-2	1 Q	Komar (UKR); L 9-15	did not advance			
Alessio Sarri	Men's foil B	Bezyazychny (BLR)	W 5-2	1 Q	Komar (UKR); L 9-15	did not advance			
Alessio Sarri	Men's sabre B	Cratere (FRA)	L 4-5	4 Q	Pluta (POL); W 15-14	Cratere (FRA); L 13-15	did not advance		
Alessio Sarri	Men's sabre B	Bogdos (GRE)	L 3-5	4 Q	Pluta (POL); W 15-14	Cratere (FRA); L 13-15	did not advance		
Alessio Sarri	Men's sabre B	Datsko (UKR)	L 3-5	4 Q	Pluta (POL); W 15-14	Cratere (FRA); L 13-15	did not advance		
Alessio Sarri	Men's sabre B	Czop (POL)	W 5-3	4 Q	Pluta (POL); W 15-14	Cratere (FRA); L 13-15	did not advance		
Alessio Sarri	Men's sabre B	Williams (USA)	W 5-0	4 Q	Pluta (POL); W 15-14	Cratere (FRA); L 13-15	did not advance		
Alberto Serafini	Men's épée A	Maillard (FRA)	L 2-5	7	did not advance				
Alberto Serafini	Men's épée A	Markantonatos (GRE)	L 2-5	7	did not advance				
Alberto Serafini	Men's épée A	Alhaddad (KUW)	L 1-5	7	did not advance				
Alberto Serafini	Men's épée A	Davydenko (UKR)	L 2-5	7	did not advance				
Alberto Serafini	Men's épée A	Saengsawang (THA)	L 3-5	7	did not advance				
Alberto Serafini	Men's épée A	L Sanchez (ESP)	L 1-5	7	did not advance				
Alberto Serafini	Men's sabre A	Tian (CHN)	L 1-5	5 Q	Tian (CHN); L 3-15	did not advance			
Alberto Serafini	Men's sabre A	Chan W K (HKG)	L 3-5	5 Q	Tian (CHN); L 3-15	did not advance			
Alberto Serafini	Men's sabre A	Markantonatos (GRE)	L 4-5	5 Q	Tian (CHN); L 3-15	did not advance			
Alberto Serafini	Men's sabre A	Davydenko (UKR)	L 3-5	5 Q	Tian (CHN); L 3-15	did not advance			
Alberto Serafini	Men's sabre A	Redondo (ESP)	W 5-2	5 Q	Tian (CHN); L 3-15	did not advance			

==== Women ====
Athlete	Event	Qualification			Round of 16	Quarterfinal	Semifinal	Final / BM	
Athlete	Event	Opposition	Score	Rank	Opposition Score	Opposition Score	Opposition Score	Opposition Score	Rank
Loredana Trigilia	Women's épée A	Zhang C (CHN)	L 25	5	did not advance				
Loredana Trigilia	Women's épée A	Gorlina (UKR)	L 3-5	5	did not advance				
Loredana Trigilia	Women's épée A	Krajnyak (HUN)	L 2-5	5	did not advance				
Loredana Trigilia	Women's épée A	Fan P S (HKG)	L 3-5	5	did not advance				
Loredana Trigilia	Women's épée A	Picot (FRA)	W 5-2	5	did not advance				
Loredana Trigilia	Women's foil A	Zhang C (CHN)	L 0-5	3 Q	—N/a	Fan P S (HKG); L 13-15	did not advance		
Loredana Trigilia	Women's foil A	Yu C Y (HKG)	L 2-5	3 Q	—N/a	Fan P S (HKG); L 13-15	did not advance		
Loredana Trigilia	Women's foil A	Picot (FRA)	W 5-4	3 Q	—N/a	Fan P S (HKG); L 13-15	did not advance		
Loredana Trigilia	Women's foil A	Halkina (BLR)	W 5-3	3 Q	—N/a	Fan P S (HKG); L 13-15	did not advance		
Loredana Trigilia	Women's foil A	Juhasz (HUN)	W 5-3	3 Q	—N/a	Fan P S (HKG); L 13-15	did not advance		
Rosalba Vettraino	Women's épée B	Vasilyeva (RUS)	L 1-5	4 Q	Palfi (HUN); L 9-15	did not advance			
Rosalba Vettraino	Women's épée B	Yao F (CHN)	L 1-5	4 Q	Palfi (HUN); L 9-15	did not advance			
Rosalba Vettraino	Women's épée B	Magnat (FRA)	L 2-5	4 Q	Palfi (HUN); L 9-15	did not advance			
Rosalba Vettraino	Women's épée B	Palfi (HUN)	W 5-1	4 Q	Palfi (HUN); L 9-15	did not advance			
Rosalba Vettraino	Women's épée B	Demello (USA)	W 5-4	4 Q	Palfi (HUN); L 9-15	did not advance			
Rosalba Vettraino	Women's foil B	Yao F (CHN)	L 1-5	6	did not advance				
Rosalba Vettraino	Women's foil B	Dani (HUN)	L 3-5	6	did not advance				
Rosalba Vettraino	Women's foil B	Lukianenko (UKR)	L 0-5	6	did not advance				
Rosalba Vettraino	Women's foil B	Magnat (FRA)	L 3-5	6	did not advance				
Rosalba Vettraino	Women's foil B	Hassen Bey (ESP)	W 5-4	6	did not advance				

=== Wheelchair tennis ===
==== Men ====
Athlete	Class	Event	Round of 64	Round of 32	Round of 16	Quarterfinals	Semifinals	Finals
Athlete	Class	Event	Opposition Result	Opposition Result	Opposition Result	Opposition Result	Opposition Result	Opposition Result
Mario Gatelli	Open	Men's singles	Simpson (GBR); W 6–1, 6–7, 6-4	Jeremiasz (FRA); L 0–6, 2-6	did not advance			
Fabian Mazzei	Open	Men's singles	Khulongrua (THA); L 7–6, 2–6, 3-6	did not advance				
Mario Gatelli; Fabian Mazzei	Open	Men's doubles	—N/a	Jewitt (GBR) / Simpson (GBR); W 6–4, 6-4	Jaroszewski (POL) / Kruszelnicki (POL); L 0–6, 0-6	did not advance		

==== Women ====
Athlete	Class	Event	Round of 32	Round of 16	Quarterfinals	Semifinals	Finals
Athlete	Class	Event	Opposition Result	Opposition Result	Opposition Result	Opposition Result	Opposition Result
Silvia di Maria	Open	Women's singles	Hwang M H (KOR); L 2–6, 2-6	did not advance			
Mariana Lauro	Open	Women's singles	Hu D (CHN); L 2–6, 4-6	did not advance			
Silvia di Maria; Mariana Lauro	Open	Women's doubles	—N/a	Okabe (JPN) / Yaosa (JPN); L 4–6, 0-6	did not advance		

==== Quads ====
Athlete	Class	Event	Round of 16	Quarterfinals	Semifinals	Finals
Athlete	Class	Event	Opposition Result	Opposition Result	Opposition Result	Opposition Result
Giuseppe Polidori	Open	Quad singles	Timmermans van Hall (NED); L 1–6, 6–3, 3-6	did not advance		
Antonio Raffaele	Open	Quad singles	van Erp (NED); L 1–6, 1-6	did not advance		
Giuseppe Polidori; Antonio Raffaele	Open	Quad doubles	—N/a	Timmermans van Hall (NED) / van Erp (NED); L 0–6, 2-6	did not advance	

== See also ==
- Italy at the Paralympics
- Italy at the 2008 Summer Olympics
