= Table tennis at the 2008 Summer Paralympics – Women's individual – Class 3 =

Women's Individual Class 3 at the XIII Paralympic Games
- Venue: Peking University Gymnasium
- Dates: 7–11 September 2008
- Competitors: 16 from 12 nations

Medalists
1st place, gold medalist(s)		Li Qian	China
2nd place, silver medalist(s)		Alena Kanova	Slovakia
3rd place, bronze medalist(s)		Mateja Pintar	Slovenia

The women's individual class 3 table tennis competition at the 2008 Summer Paralympics was held between 7 September and 11 September at the Peking University Gymnasium.

Classes 1–5 in para-athletics are designated for athletes with physical impairments that predominantly affect their lower limbs, necessitating competition in a seated position. Lower class numbers indicate a higher level of impairment that significantly affects the athlete's ability to compete effectively.

The event was won by Li Qian, representing China.

== Results ==
=== Preliminary round ===
Qualified for the knock-out stages

==== Group A ====
Rank	Competitor	MP	W	L	Points	SLO	AUT	FRA	ITA
1	Mateja Pintar (SLO)	3	3	0	9:4	x	3:2	3:2	3:0
2	Doris Mader (AUT)	3	2	1	8:4	2:3	x	3:0	3:1
3	Fanny Bertrand (FRA)	3	1	2	5:6	2:3	0:3	x	3:0
4	Federica Cudia (ITA)	3	0	3	1:9	0:3	1:3	0:3	x

7 September, 18:00

Doris Mader (AUT)	11	12	13
Fanny Bertrand (FRA)	8	10	11
Mateja Pintar (SLO)	11	11	11
Federica Cudia (ITA)	4	8	6

8 September, 16:40

Doris Mader (AUT)	8	11	17	11	
Federica Cudia (ITA)	11	8	15	4	
Mateja Pintar (SLO)	8	9	11	11	11
Fanny Bertrand (FRA)	11	11	5	9	6

9 September, 16:00

Fanny Bertrand (FRA)	12	11	11		
Federica Cudia (ITA)	10	7	7		
Mateja Pintar (SLO)	10	11	11	9	11
Doris Mader (AUT)	12	7	7	11	7

==== Group B ====
Rank	Competitor	MP	W	L	Points	SVK	IRI	FRA	ITA
1	Alena Kanova (SVK)	3	3	0	9:0	x	3:0	3:0	3:0
2	Forough Bakhtiary (IRI)	3	1	2	5:6	0:3	x	2:3	3:0
3	Stephanie Mariage (FRA)	3	1	2	5:8	0:3	3:2	x	2:3
4	Christina Ploner (ITA)	3	1	2	3:8	0:3	0:3	3:2	x

7 September, 18:00

Christina Ploner (ITA)	10	11	6	11	13
Stephanie Mariage (FRA)	12	6	11	8	11
Alena Kanova (SVK)	11	11	11		
Forough Bakhtiary (IRI)	6	4	6		

8 September, 16:40

Stephanie Mariage (FRA)	6	7	11	11	11
Forough Bakhtiary (IRI)	11	11	9	8	8
Alena Kanova (SVK)	11	11	11		
Christina Ploner (ITA)	4	4	9		

9 September, 16:00

Forough Bakhtiary (IRI)	11	11	11
Christina Ploner (ITA)	6	6	5
Alena Kanova (SVK)	11	11	12
Stephanie Mariage (FRA)	3	5	10

==== Group C ====
Rank	Competitor	MP	W	L	Points	CHN	KOR	CUB	IRL
1	Li Qian (CHN)	3	3	0	9:2	x	3:1	3:0	3:1
2	Choi Hyun Ja (KOR)	3	2	1	7:4	1:3	x	3:0	3:1
3	Yanelis Silva (CUB)	3	1	2	3:8	0:3	0:3	x	3:2
4	Kathleen Reynolds (IRL)	3	0	3	4:9	1:3	1:3	2:3	x

8 September, 16:40

Choi Hyun-ja (KOR)	11	11	11	
Yanelis Silva (CUB)	9	9	3	
Li Qian (CHN)	11	9	11	11
Kathleen Reynolds (IRL)	8	11	5	4

9 September, 16:00

Choi Hyun-ja (KOR)	8	11	11	11
Kathleen Reynolds (IRL)	11	6	5	5
Li Qian (CHN)	11	11	11	
Yanelis Silva (CUB)	6	3	8	

9 September, 17:20

Yanelis Silva (CUB)	11	3	11	8	11
Kathleen Reynolds (IRL)	4	11	6	11	5
Li Qian (CHN)	11	11	11	11	
Choi Hyun-ja (KOR)	13	9	3	8	

==== Group D ====
Rank	Competitor	MP	W	L	Points	ITA	SWE	FRA	RSA
1	Michela Brunelli (ITA)	3	2	1	7:3	x	1:3	3:0	3:0
2	Anna-Carin Ahlquist (SWE)	3	2	1	8:5	3:1	x	2:3	3:1
3	Marie-Christine Fillou (FRA)	3	2	1	6:5	0:3	3:2	x	3:0
4	Alet Moll (RSA)	3	0	3	1:9	0:3	1:3	0:3	x

8 September, 16:40

Anna-Carin Ahlquist (SWE)	11	11	9	11
Alet Moll (RSA)	4	5	11	7
Michela Brunelli (ITA)	14	11	11	
Marie-Christine Fillou (FRA)	12	6	7	

9 September, 16:00

Marie-Christine Fillou (FRA)	8	2	13	11	11
Anna-Carin Ahlquist (SWE)	11	11	11	8	8
Michela Brunelli (ITA)	11	11	11		
Alet Moll (RSA)	2	6	3		

9 September, 17:20

Marie-Christine Fillou (FRA)	11	11	11	
Alet Moll (RSA)	5	6	4	
Anna-Carin Ahlquist (SWE)	11	9	13	11
Michela Brunelli (ITA)	8	11	11	9

=== Competition bracket ===
Semifinals: 10 Sep 10:00
Mateja Pintar (SLO)	3	8	11	8
Li Qian (CHN)	11	11	9	11
Michela Brunelli (ITA)	6	11	9	3
Alena Kanova (SVK)	11	9	11	11

Gold medal match: 10 Sep 16:45
Li Qian (CHN)	11	16	11
Alena Kanova (SVK)	4	14	7
Bronze medal match: 10 Sep 16:45
Mateja Pintar (SLO)	11	12	11
Michela Brunelli (ITA)	7	10	3
