= Slovenia at the 2008 Summer Paralympics =

- IPC code: SLO
- NPC: Sports Federation for the Disabled of Slovenia
- Website: www.zsis.si

in Beijing
- Competitors: 30 in 7 sports
- Medals Ranked 59th: Gold 0 Silver 1 Bronze 2 Total 3

Summer Paralympics appearances (overview)
- 1992; 1996; 2000; 2004; 2008; 2012; 2016; 2020; 2024

Other related appearances
- Yugoslavia (1972–2000)

Slovenia competed at the 2008 Summer Paralympics in Beijing. The country was represented by thirty athletes competing in seven sports. The delegation was Slovenia's largest in its history as an independent country.

== Medalists ==
Medal	Name	Sport	Event
Silver	Jože Flere	Athletics	Men's discus throw F32/51
Bronze	Mateja Pintar	Table tennis	Women's individual Class 3
Bronze	Franc Pinter	Shooting	Men's 10 m air rifle standing SH1

== Sports ==
=== Athletics ===
==== Men's field ====
Athlete	Class	Event	Final		
Athlete	Class	Event	Result	Points	Rank
Jože Flere	F32/51	Club throw	21.37	888	9
Jože Flere	F32/51	Discus throw	10.99	1119	2nd place, silver medalist(s)
Henrik Plank	F33-34/52	Discus throw	14.47	775	9
Henrik Plank	F33-34/52	Javelin throw	14.49	828	10
Henrik Plank	F33-34/52	Shot put	8.06	883	13

==== Women's ====
Athlete	Class	Event	Final		
Athlete	Class	Event	Result	Points	Rank
Tanja Cerkvenik	F54-56	Javelin throw	18.69	1053	5
Tatjana Majcen Ljubič	F54-56	Discus throw	14.78	876	7
Tatjana Majcen Ljubič	F54-56	Javelin throw	12.78	873	12
Tatjana Majcen Ljubič	F54-56	Shot put	6.27	1010	5

=== Cycling ===
==== Men's road ====
Athlete	Event	Time	Rank
David Kuster	Men's road race LC1/LC2/CP4	2:01:50	27
David Kuster	Men's road time trial LC2	42:53.77	11

==== Men's track ====
Athlete	Event	Qualification		1st round		Final	
Athlete	Event	Time	Rank	Time	Rank	Opposition Time	Rank
David Kuster	Men's individual pursuit LC2	5:50.39	10	did not advance			
David Kuster	Men's time trial LC2	—				1:19.76	11

=== Goalball ===
The men's goalball team didn't win any medals; they were 7th out of 12 teams.

==== Players ====
- Gorazd Dolanc
- Matej Ledinek
- Dejan Pirc
- Simon Podobnikar
- Ivan Vinkler
- Boštjan Vogrinčič

==== Tournament ====
7 September 2008

Slovenia	7–2	Finland

Beijing Institute of Technology Gymnasium
8 September 2008

Denmark	2–4	Slovenia

Beijing Institute of Technology Gymnasium
9 September 2008

Slovenia	6–5	Belgium

Beijing Institute of Technology Gymnasium
10 September 2008

Spain	9–11	Slovenia

Beijing Institute of Technology Gymnasium
11 September 2008

Slovenia	7–6	Lithuania

Beijing Institute of Technology Gymnasium

Quarterfinals

12 September 2008

United States	4–2	Slovenia

Beijing Institute of Technology Gymnasium

5th-8th classification

13 September 2008

Slovenia	4–6	Denmark

Beijing Institute of Technology Gymnasium

7/8th classification

14 September 2008

Finland	6–5	Slovenia

Beijing Institute of Technology Gymnasium

=== Shooting ===
Athlete	Event	Qualification		Final		
Athlete	Event	Score	Rank	Score	Total	Rank
Damjan Pavlin	Mixed 10m air rifle prone SH2	599	4	105.0	704.0	5
Damjan Pavlin	Mixed 10m air rifle standing SH2	596	12	did not advance		
Franc Pinter	Men's 10m air rifle standing SH1	590	6 Q	103.2	693.2	3rd place, bronze medalist(s)
Franc Pinter	Men's 50m rifle 3 positions SH1	1148	4 Q	95.6	1243.6	4
Franc Pinter	Mixed 10m air rifle prone SH1	596	22	did not advance		
Franc Pinter	Mixed 50m rifle prone SH1	579	29	did not advance		

=== Swimming ===
Athlete	Class	Event	Heats		Final	
Athlete	Class	Event	Result	Rank	Result	Rank
Dejan Fabčič	S7	50m freestyle	33.80	9	did not advance	
Dejan Fabčič	S7	100m freestyle	1:11.85	12	did not advance	
Dejan Fabčič	SM7	200m individual medley	3:05.24	11	did not advance	

=== Table tennis ===
Slovenian competitors, including Mateja Pintar, took part in table tennis events who won the gold medal in her category in 2004 Summer Paralympics.

==== Men ====
Athlete	Event	Preliminaries			Quarterfinals	Semifinals	Final / BM	
Athlete	Event	Opposition Result	Opposition Result	Rank	Opposition Result	Opposition Result	Opposition Result	Rank
Ivan Lisac	Men's singles C3	Kim Y G (KOR); L 2–3	Zhao P (CHN); L 0–3	3	did not advance			
Bojan Lukežič	Men's singles C3	Merrien (FRA); L 0–3	Jeyoung (KOR); L 2–3	3	did not advance			
Ivan Lisac; Bojan Lukežič	Men's team C3	—			France (FRA); L 0–3	did not advance		

==== Women ====
Athlete	Event	Preliminaries				Round of 16	Quarterfinals	Semifinals	Final / BM	
Athlete	Event	Opposition Result	Opposition Result	Opposition Result	Rank	Opposition Result	Opposition Result	Opposition Result	Opposition Result	Rank
Jolanda Belavič	Women's singles C9	Lei L (CHN); L 0–3	Kavas (TUR); L 0–3	Maldonado (BRA); L 1–3	4	did not advance				
Andreja Dolinar	Women's singles C4	Perić (SRB); L 0–3	Al-Azzam (JOR); L 0–3	Rozmiej (POL); W 3–2	3	did not advance				
Mateja Pintar	Women's singles C3	Mader (AUT); W 3–2	Bertrand (FRA); W 3–2	Cudia (ITA); W 3–0	1 Q	—		Li Q (CHN); L 1–3	Brunelli (ITA); W 3–0	3rd place, bronze medalist(s)
Andreja Dolinar; Mateja Pintar	Women's team C4-5	—				Hong Kong (HKG); W 3–1	Germany (GER); L 1–3	did not advance		

=== Volleyball ===
==== Women's tournament ====
The women's volleyball team didn't win any medals; they were defeated by the Netherlands in the bronze medal match.

Players

- Marinka Cencelj
- Danica Gošnak
- Emilie Gradišek
- Bogomira Jakin
- Ana Justin
- Saša Kotnik
- Boža Kovačič
- Suzana Ocepek
- Alenka Šart
- Štefka Tomič
- Anita Urnaut

Group A matches

8 September 2008; 9:00	Japan (JPN)	1–3	Slovenia (SLO)	China Agricultural University Gymnasium
8 September 2008; 9:00	(19–25, 25–21, 19–19, 9–25)			China Agricultural University Gymnasium

9 September 2008; 16:00	Slovenia (SLO)	3–1	Ukraine (UKR)	China Agricultural University Gymnasium
9 September 2008; 16:00	(11–25, 25–18, 25–17, 25–22)			China Agricultural University Gymnasium

10 September 2008; 16:00	Netherlands (NED)	3–2	Slovenia (SLO)	China Agricultural University Gymnasium
10 September 2008; 16:00	(23–25, 25–17, 25–16, 22–25, 15–11)			China Agricultural University Gymnasium

Semifinals

11 September 2008; 19:00	Slovenia (SLO)	0–3	China (CHN)	China Agricultural University Gymnasium
11 September 2008; 19:00	(21–25, 12–25, 19–25)			China Agricultural University Gymnasium

Bronze medal match

14 September 2008; 14:00	Netherlands (NED)	3–0	Slovenia (SLO)	China Agricultural University Gymnasium
14 September 2008; 14:00	(25–17, 25–16, 25–24)			China Agricultural University Gymnasium

== See also ==
- 2008 Summer Paralympics
- Slovenia at the Paralympics
- Slovenia at the 2008 Summer Olympics
