= Table tennis at the 2008 Summer Paralympics – Women's team – Class 1–3 =

Women's team 2008

Women's Team Class 1–3 at the XIII Paralympic Games
- Venue: Peking University Gymnasium
- Dates: 13 – 16 September 2008
- Competitors: 6

Medalists
1st place, gold medalist(s)		Li Qian; Liu Jing	China
2nd place, silver medalist(s)		Michela Brunelli; Federica Cudia; Pamela Pezzutto; Clara Podda	Italy
3rd place, bronze medalist(s)		Isabelle Lafaye; Fanny Bertrand; Stephanie Mariage; Marie-Christine Fillou	France

The Women's Team Class 1–3 table tennis competition at the 2008 Summer Paralympics was held between 13 September and 16 September at the Peking University Gymnasium. Classes 6–10 were for athletes with a physical impairment who competed from a standing position; the lower the number, the greater the impact the impairment had on an athlete's ability to compete.

The competition was a straight knock-out format. Each tie was decided by the best of a potential five matches, two singles, a doubles (not necessarily the same players) and two reverse singles.

The event was won by the team representing China.

== Competition bracket ==
Quarterfinals
Iran	2
Great Britain	3
France	3
Ireland	1

Semifinals
Italy	3
Great Britain	0
France	1
China	3

Final
Italy	1
China	3
Third place
Great Britain	0
France	3

== Quarter-finals ==
13 September 2008; 19:00	Iran	2–3	Great Britain

Report	Individual matches
Forough Bakhtiary	3–1	Dzaier Neil	3–11, 11–7, 11–7, 16–14
Narges Khazaei	0–3	Cathy Mitton	5–11, 3–11, 11–13
Forough Bakhtiary / Narges Khazaei	2–3	Dzaier Neil / Cathy Mitton	11–7, 11–9, 5–11, 11–13, 9–11
Forough Bakhtiary	3–0	Cathy Mitton	11–6, 11–5, 12–10
Narges Khazaei	0–3	Dzaier Neil	6–11, 6–11, 6–11

13 September 2008; 19:00	Ireland	1–3	France

Report	Individual matches
Kathleen Reynolds	3–0	Marie-Christine Fillou	11–6, 11–6, 11–8
Eimear Breathnach	0–3	Fanny Bertrand	5–11, 5–11, 6–11
Kathleen Reynolds / Eimear Breathnach	0–3	Isabelle Lafaye / Stephanie Mariage	9–11, 4–11, 7–11
Kathleen Reynolds	1–3	Fanny Bertrand	4–11, 5–11, 11–4, 5–11

== Semi-finals ==
14 September 2008; 19:00	Italy	3–0	Great Britain

Report	Individual matches
Michela Brunelli	3–0	Dzaier Neil	12–10, 11–5, 11–3
Federica Cudia	3–1	Cathy Mitton	9–11, 11–8, 11–4, 11–9
Pamela Pezzutto / Clara Podda	3–0	Dzaier Neil / Cathy Mitton	11–7, 11–8, 11–8

14 September 2008; 19:00	China	3–1	France

Report	Individual matches
Li Qian	3–0	Stephanie Mariage	11–6, 11–5, 11–6
Liu Jing	2–3	Fanny Bertrand	7–11, 11–7, 9–11, 11–6, 7–11
Li Qian / Liu Jing	3–2	Stephanie Mariage / Isabelle Lafaye	3–11, 9–11, 11–7, 11–5, 11–8
Li Qian	3–1	Fanny Bertrand	11–7, 8–11, 11–9, 11–8

== Finals ==
Gold medal match

15 September 2008; 16:30	Italy	1–3	China

Report	Individual matches
Michela Brunelli	3–1	Liu Jing	3–11, 11–7, 11–5, 11–7
Clara Podda	0–3	Li Qian	5–11, 7–11, 3–11
Michela Brunelli / Clara Podda	1–3	Liu Jing / Li Qian	14–12, 3–11, 7–11, 4–11
Michela Brunelli	1–3	Li Qian	7–11, 11–8, 9–11, 10–12

Bronze medal match

15 September 2008; 16:30	Great Britain	0–3	France

Report	Individual matches
Cathy Mitton	2–3	Isabelle Lafaye	9–11, 13–11, 11–7, 9–11, 3–11
Dzaier Neil	0–3	Fanny Bertrand	9–11, 7–11, 5–11
Cathy Mitton / Dzaier Neil	0–3	Isabelle Lafaye / Stephanie Mariage	1–11, 7–11, 4–11

== Team Lists ==
China; Li Qian; Liu Jing	Italy; Michela Brunelli; Federica Cudia; Pamela Pezzutto; Clara Podda	France; Isabelle Lafaye; Fanny Bertrand; Stephanie Mariage; Marie-Christine Fillou	Great Britain; Cathy Mitton; Dzaier Neil
Iran; Forough Bakhtiary; Narges Khazaei	Ireland; Kathleen Reynolds; Eimear Breathnach		
