= Athletics at the 2008 Summer Paralympics – Men's 100 metres T42 =

The Men's 100m T42 had its Final held on September 14 at 11:00.

== Medalists ==
Gold	Earle Connor; Canada
Silver	Heinrich Popow; Germany
Bronze	John McFall; Great Britain

== Results ==
Place	Athlete	Final
1	Earle Connor (CAN)	12.32 PR
2	Heinrich Popow (GER)	12.98
3	John McFall (GBR)	13.08
4	Stefano Lippi (ITA)	13.50
5	Atsushi Yamamoto (JPN)	13.68
	Clavel Kayitare (FRA)	DSQ
