= Shooting at the 2008 Summer Paralympics – Mixed 10 metre air rifle standing SH2 =

Mixed 10 metre air rifle standing SH2 at the XIII Paralympic Games
- Venue: Beijing Shooting Range Hall
- Dates: September 11, 2008
- Competitors: 22 from 15 nations

Medalists
1st place, gold medalist(s)		Lee Ji-seok	South Korea
2nd place, silver medalist(s)		Raphael Voltz	France
3rd place, bronze medalist(s)		Michael Johnson	New Zealand

The Mixed 10 metre air rifle standing SH2 event at the 2008 Summer Paralympics took place on September 11 at the Beijing Shooting Range Hall.

== Qualification round ==
Rank	Athlete	Country	1	2	3	4	5	6	Total	Notes
1	Lee Ji-seok	South Korea	100	100	100	100	100	100	600	Q
2	Raphael Voltz	France	99	100	99	100	100	100	598	Q
3	Michael Brengmann	Germany	100	99	99	100	100	100	598	Q
4	Liu Jie	China	100	100	100	98	99	100	597	Q
5	Jason Maroney	Australia	100	99	100	100	99	99	597	Q
6	You Ho-gyoung	South Korea	100	100	100	99	99	99	597	Q
7	Michael Johnson	New Zealand	100	100	99	100	100	98	597	Q
8	Tanguy de la Forest	France	99	99	100	99	99	100	596	Q
9	Sergey Nochevnoy	Russia	99	99	100	99	99	100	596	
10	Viktoria Wedin	Sweden	99	99	100	99	99	100	596	
11	Yuan Hongxiang	China	99	99	99	100	100	99	596	
12	Damjan Pavlin	Slovenia	99	99	100	100	99	99	596	
13	Evangelos Kakosaios	Greece	99	100	100	99	100	98	596	
14	Johnny Andersen	Denmark	98	100	99	100	100	98	595	
15	Ivica Bratanovic	Croatia	100	100	100	99	97	98	594	
16	Panagiotis Giannoukaris	Greece	98	100	99	98	100	97	592	
17	Cedric Rio	France	97	99	99	99	98	98	590	
18	Sinisa Vidic	Serbia	98	98	96	99	99	99	589	
19	James Bevis	Great Britain	98	100	97	99	97	98	589	
20	Lone Overbye	Denmark	99	97	98	97	100	97	588	
21	Rudolf Petrovic	Croatia	98	97	96	98	98	96	583	
22	Yukiko Kinoshita	Japan	95	96	98	96	93	97	575	

Q Qualified for final

== Final ==
Rank	Athlete	Country	Qual	1	2	3	4	5	6	7	8	9	10	Final	Total	Shoot-off
1	Lee Ji-seok	South Korea	600	10.3	10.6	10.1	10.6	10.4	10.6	10.3	10.7	10.1	10.6	104.3	704.3	
2	Raphael Voltz	France	598	10.3	10.3	10.8	10.5	10.9	10.8	9.7	10.7	10.8	10.7	105.5	703.5	
3	Michael Johnson	New Zealand	597	10.4	10.7	10.6	10.4	10.7	10.4	10.7	10.1	9.9	10.3	104.2	701.2	10.6
4	You Ho-gyoung	South Korea	597	10.7	10.9	10.2	10.1	10.4	10.6	10.7	10.5	10.3	9.8	104.2	701.2	10.2
5	Jason Maroney	Australia	597	10.6	10.3	10.4	10.4	10.7	10.7	9.7	9.7	10.7	10.4	103.6	700.6	
6	Michael Brengmann	Germany	598	10.5	9.5	10.8	10.2	9.4	9.8	10.6	10.6	10.5	10.5	102.4	700.4	
7	Tanguy de la Forest	France	596	10.5	9.6	10.5	10.4	10.0	10.6	10.3	10.9	10.6	10.3	103.7	699.7	
8	Liu Jie	China	597	10.1	9.9	10.3	9.8	10.5	10.2	10.1	10.4	10.1	10.2	101.6	698.6	
