= Li Qian (Paralympian) =

Chinese para table tennis player

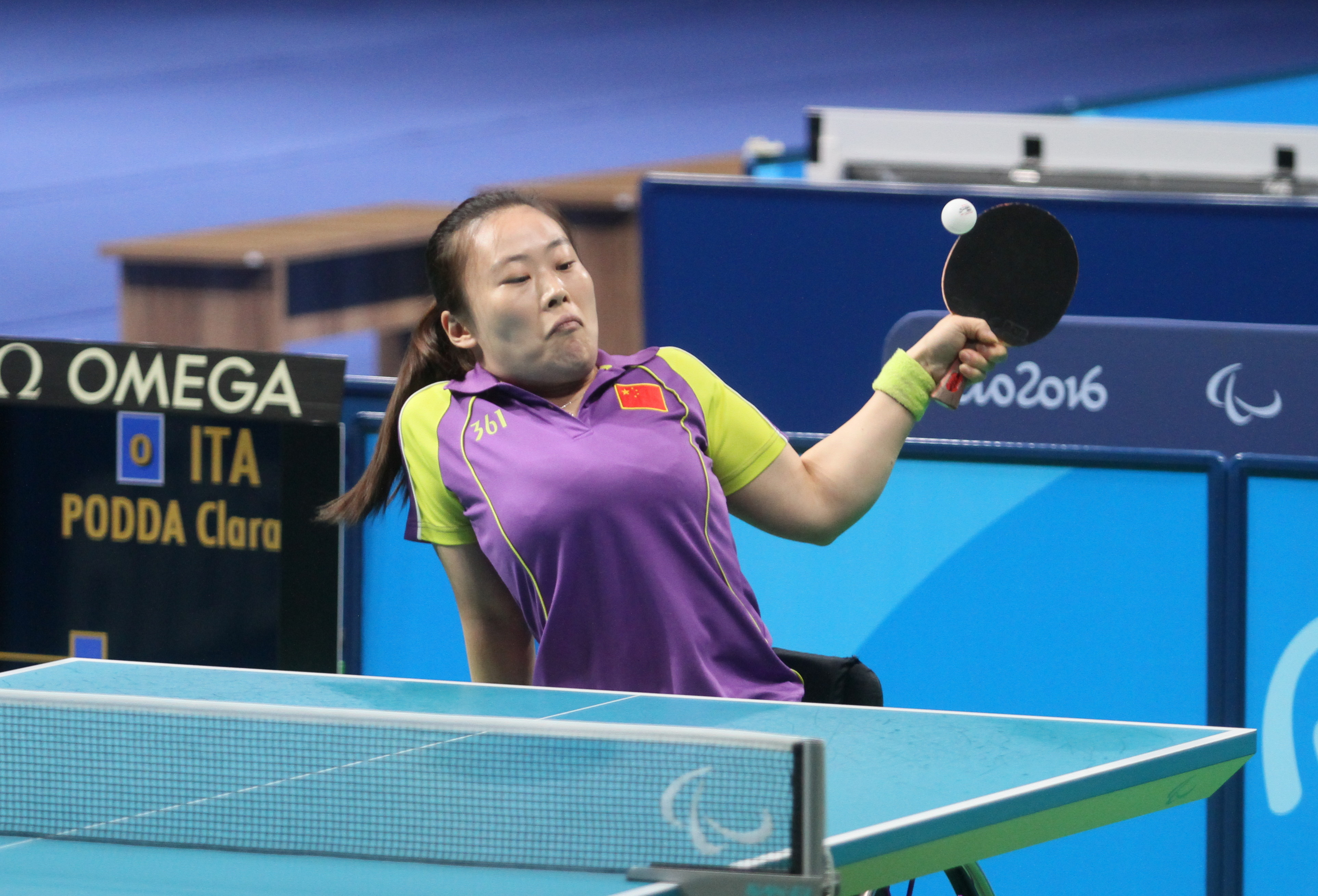
- Li at the 2016 Summer Paralympics

Personal information
- Born: February 13, 1989 (age 37) Pizhou, Jiangsu, China
- Height: 160 cm (5 ft 3 in)
- Weight: 40 kg (88 lb)

Sport
- Sport: Table tennis
- Playing style: Left-handed shakehand grip
- Disability class: 3
- Highest ranking: 1 (July 2011)
- Current ranking: 5 (February 2020)
Medal record
Women's para table tennis
Representing China
Paralympic Games
Gold medal – first place	2008 Beijing	Singles C3
Gold medal – first place	2008 Beijing	Teams C1–3
Gold medal – first place	2012 London	Teams C1–3
Gold medal – first place	2016 Rio de Janeiro	Teams C1–3
Gold medal – first place	2020 Tokyo	Teams C1-3
Silver medal – second place	2016 Rio de Janeiro	Singles C3
World Championships
Gold medal – first place	2006 Montreux	Singles C3
Gold medal – first place	2006 Montreux	Teams C1–3
Gold medal – first place	2010 Gwangju	Singles C3
Gold medal – first place	2010 Gwangju	Teams C3
Gold medal – first place	2014 Beijing	Singles C3
Gold medal – first place	2014 Beijing	Teams C3
Silver medal – second place	2018 Lasko	Singles C3
Bronze medal – third place	2010 Gwangju	Open singles in wheelchair
Asian Para Games
Gold medal – first place	2010 Guangzhou	Singles C1–3
Gold medal – first place	2010 Guangzhou	Teams C1–3
Gold medal – first place	2014 Incheon	Teams C1–3
Silver medal – second place	2018 Jakarta	Singles C1–3
Silver medal – second place	2018 Jakarta	Teams C2–5
Bronze medal – third place	2014 Incheon	Singles C3
FESPIC Games
Gold medal – first place	2006 Kuala Lumpur	Singles C3
Bronze medal – third place	2006 Kuala Lumpur	Open Singles standing
Asian Championships
Gold medal – first place	2007 Seoul	Singles C3
Gold medal – first place	2007 Seoul	Teams C1–3
Gold medal – first place	2009 Amman	Singles C3
Gold medal – first place	2009 Amman	Teams C1–3
Gold medal – first place	2011 Hong Kong	Singles C3
Gold medal – first place	2013 Beijing	Singles C3
Gold medal – first place	2013 Beijing	Teams C1–3
Gold medal – first place	2015 Amman	Singles C3
Gold medal – first place	2015 Amman	Teams C1–3
Gold medal – first place	2017 Beijing	Teams C1–3
Silver medal – second place	2019 Taichung	Singles C3

Li Qian (Chinese: 李倩; pinyin: Lǐ Qiàn, born 13 February 1989) is a Chinese para table tennis player who has won four gold medals and one silver medal from three Paralympic Games (2008, 2012, and 2016). She has won international team titles with Liu Jing.

Like many of her teammates, Li was a polio victim from Pizhou who attended New Hope Center as a child. That's where coach Heng Xin developed her into a star.
