= Isabelle Lafaye Marziou =

French para table tennis player

Isabelle Lafaye
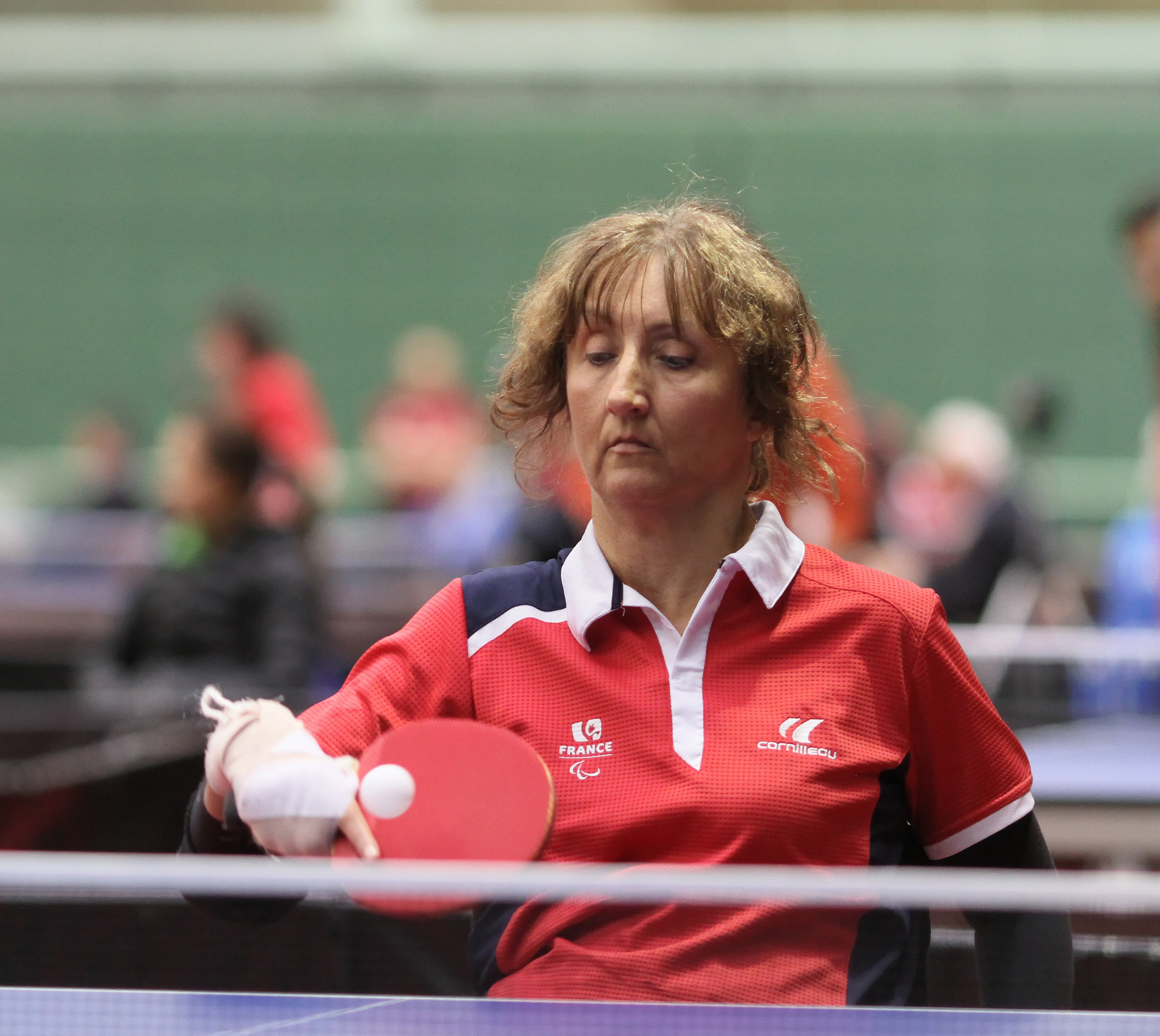
- Lafaye in 2017

Personal information
- Full name: Isabelle Lafaye Marziou
- Nickname: Isa
- Born: 9 July 1963 (age 62) Saint-Jean-du-Gard, France
- Height: 169 cm (5 ft 7 in)
- Spouse: Gaël Marziou

Sport
- Country: France
- Sport: Para table tennis
- Disability: Spinal cord injury
- Disability class: C2
- Club: CS Charcot TT
- Coached by: Nicolas Gras
Medal record
Para table tennis
Representing France
Paralympic Games
Gold medal – first place	1996 Atlanta	Women's singles C1-2
Gold medal – first place	2000 Sydney	Women's teams C1-3
Gold medal – first place	2004 Athens	Women's singles C1-2
Gold medal – first place	2004 Athens	Women's teams C2-3
Silver medal – second place	2000 Sydney	Women's singles C1-2
Bronze medal – third place	2008 Beijing	Women's teams C1-3
Bronze medal – third place	2012 London	Women's singles C1-2
World Championships
Gold medal – first place	1990 Assen	Women's singles C1-2
Gold medal – first place	1998 Paris	Women's singles C1-2
Gold medal – first place	2002 Taipei	Women's teams C1-3
Gold medal – first place	2006 Montreux	Women's singles C1-2
Silver medal – second place	2006 Montreux	Women's teams C1-3
Bronze medal – third place	1998 Paris	Women's teams C1-3
Bronze medal – third place	2002 Taipei	Women's singles C1-2
Bronze medal – third place	2014 Beijing	Women's singles C1-2
European Championships
Gold medal – first place	1997 Stockholm	Women's singles C1-2
Gold medal – first place	2001 Frankfurt	Women's singles C1-2
Gold medal – first place	2001 Frankfurt	Women's teams C2-3
Gold medal – first place	2003 Zagreb	Women's singles C2
Gold medal – first place	2003 Zagreb	Women's teams C1-2
Gold medal – first place	2005 Jesolo	Women's singles C1-2
Gold medal – first place	2007 Kranjska Gora	Women's teams C2-3
Silver medal – second place	1991 Salou	Women's singles C1-2
Silver medal – second place	1997 Stockholm	Women's teams C1-3
Silver medal – second place	2005 Jesolo	Women's teams C1-3
Silver medal – second place	2007 Kranjska Gora	Women's singles C2
Silver medal – second place	2011 Split	Women's team C2
Bronze medal – third place	2013 Lignano	Women's singles C1-2
Bronze medal – third place	2013 Lignano	Women's teams C1-3
Bronze medal – third place	2015 Vejle	Women's singles C1-2
Bronze medal – third place	2017 Lasko	Women's singles C1-2
Bronze medal – third place	2019 Helsingborg	Women's singles C2

Isabelle Lafaye Marziou (born 9 July 1963) is a French para table tennis player who plays in international level in both singles and team events. Lafaye is a four time Paralympic champion and World champion and is a seven time European champion in para table tennis. She is married to sports photographer Gaël Marziou.
