= Dzaier Neil =

Paramlympic athlete and activist

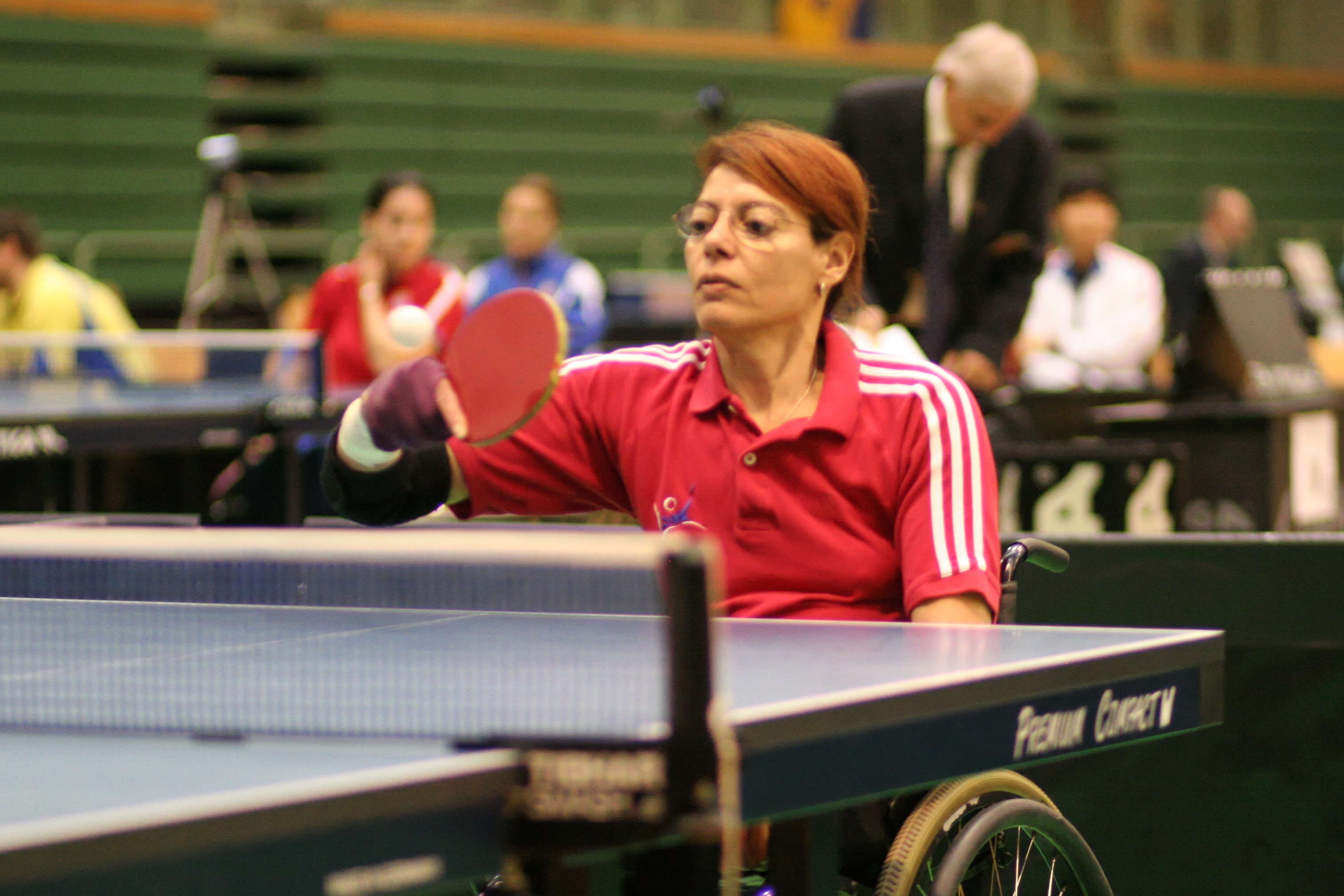
- Neil in 2008

Personal information
- Born: 1957 (age 68–69) Algeria

Sport
- Sport: Paralympic athletics Para table tennis
Medal record
Representing Great Britain
Paralympic Games
Paralympic athletics
Gold medal – first place	1984 New York	Javelin throw 1B
Bronze medal – third place	1984 New York	Shot put 1B
Paralympic Games
Para table tennis
Gold medal – first place	1984 New York	Teams 1A-C
Silver medal – second place	1984 New York	Singles 1C
European Championships
Bronze medal – third place	2005 Jesolo	Teams C4

Dzaier Djarmilia Belgasmi Neil (born 1957) is an Algerian-born British disability rights activist and former Paralympic athlete who competed internationally in track and field and table tennis. She was a convenor of the Green Party Disability Group for the Green Party of England and Wales.

Neil was born in Algeria and was orphaned at a young age. She had a spinal cord injury when a bullet struck her when crossing the border between Algeria and Tunisia. Following a short period in hospital, Neil was transferred to Stoke Mandeville in the United Kingdom to continue her rehabilitation.
