= Pamela Pezzutto =

Italian Paralympic athlete

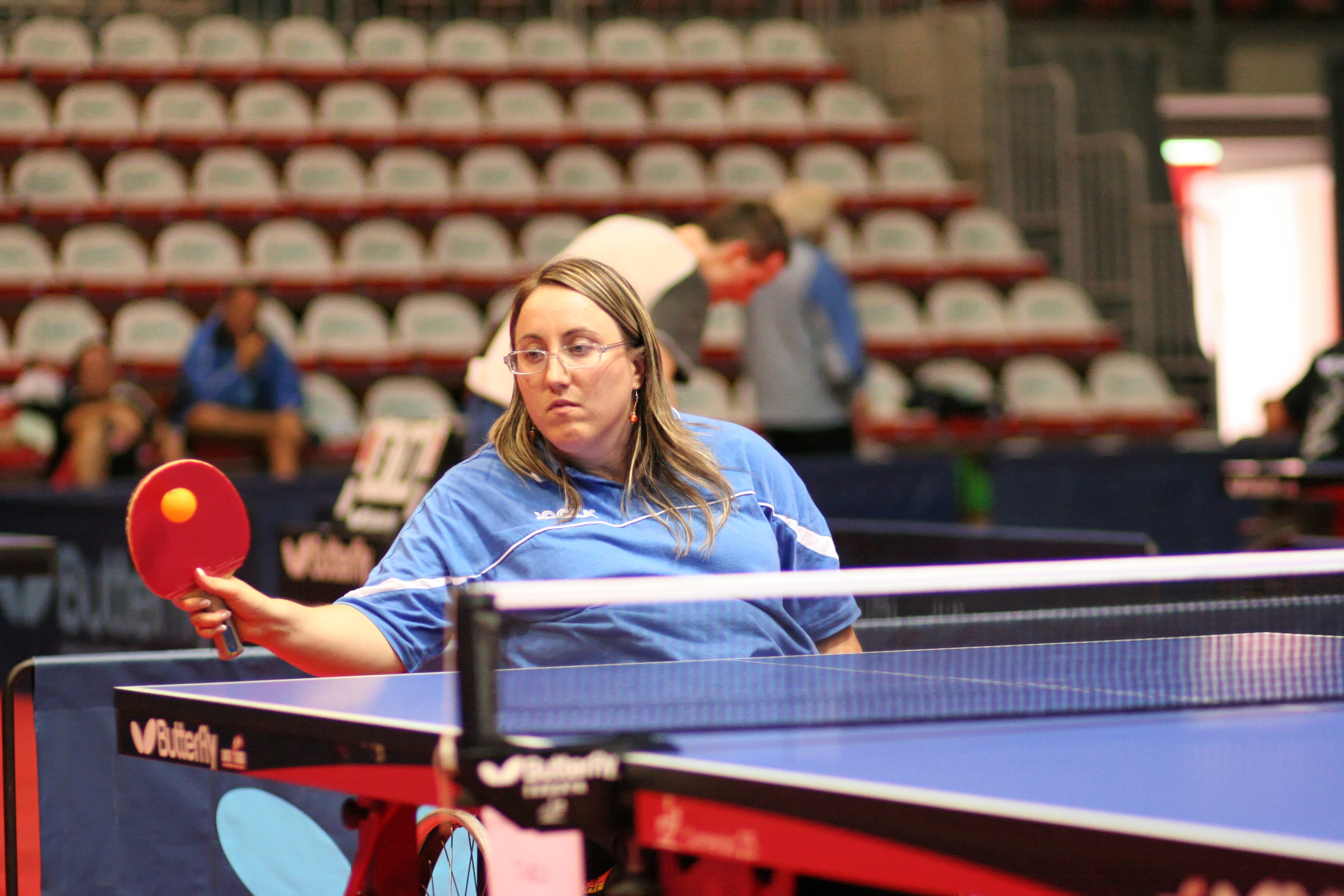

Personal information
- Nationality: Italian
- Born: 17 July 1981 (age 44) Sacile, Italy

Sport
- Country: Italy
- Sport: Para table tennis
Medal record
Women's para table tennis
Representing Italy
Paralympic Games
Silver medal – second place	2008 Beijing	Individual class 1–2
Silver medal – second place	2008 Beijing	Team class 1–3
Silver medal – second place	2012 London	Individual class 1–2
World Championships
Silver medal – second place	2010 Gwangju	Team class 1–3
Bronze medal – third place	2010 Gwangju	Individual class 1–2

Pamela Pezzutto (born 17 July 1981 in Sacile) is an Italian Paralympic athlete who has won three silver medals at Summer Paralympics.

== Biography ==
As a result of an accident she is on a wheelchair.

== See also ==
- Italy at the 2008 Summer Paralympics
- Italy at the 2012 Summer Paralympics
