= Fanny Bertrand =

French para table tennis player

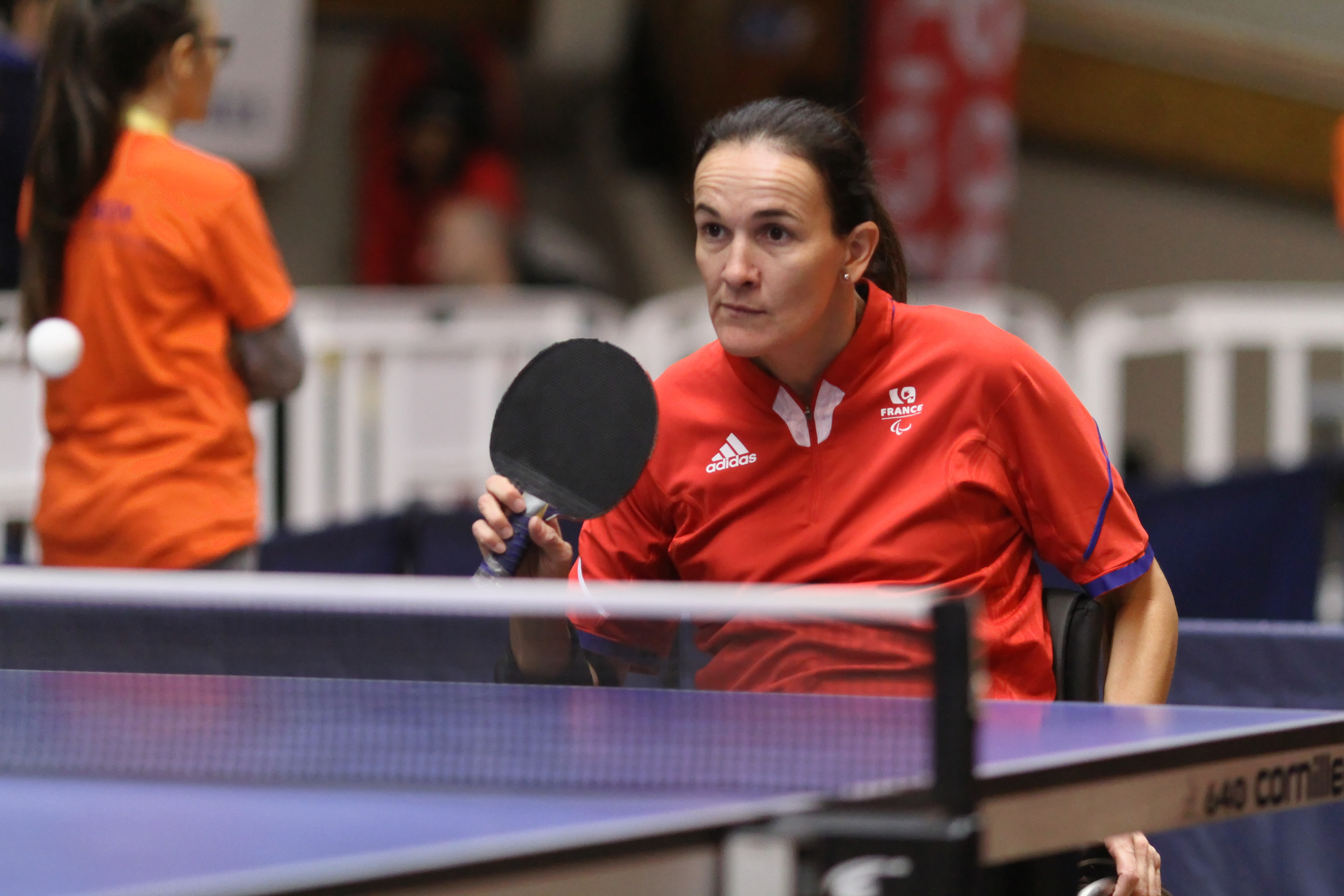
- Fanny Bertrand in 2014.

Personal information
- Born: 28 December 1976 (age 49) Orange, Vaucluse, France

Sport
- Country: France
- Sport: Para table tennis
- Disability: Paraplegia
- Disability class: C3
- Coached by: Guillaume Jean
Medal record
Para table tennis
Representing France
Paralympic Games
Bronze medal – third place	2008 Beijing	Women's team C1-3
European Championships
Gold medal – first place	2007 Kranjska Gora	Women's team C2-3
Gold medal – first place	2009 Genoa	Women's team C3
Silver medal – second place	2011 Split	Women's teams C3
Silver medal – second place	2013 Lignano	Women's singles C3
Bronze medal – third place	2007 Kranjska Gora	Women's singles C3
Bronze medal – third place	2013 Lignano	Women's teams C1-3

Fanny Bertrand (born 28 December 1976) is a French para table tennis player. She took up table tennis in 2002 as part of her rehabilitation after sustaining a spinal injury in a road accident in 2000. She has won team titles with Marie-Christine Fillou.

Her grandfather Robert Bertrand founded the eponymous basketball club FRJ Saint Blaise.
