= Federica Cudia =

Italian para table tennis player

Personal information
- Born: 16 December 1989 (age 36) Mazara del Vallo, Italy

Sport
- Country: Italy
- Sport: Para table tennis
- Disability: Spina bifida
- Disability class: C3
Medal record
Para table tennis
Representing Italy
Paralympic Games
Silver medal – second place	2008 Beijing	Women's team C1-3
World Championships
Silver medal – second place	2010 Gwangju	Women's teams C1-3
European Championships
Silver medal – second place	2009 Genoa	Women's teams C1-3
Silver medal – second place	2013 Lignano	Women's teams C1-3
Bronze medal – third place	2007 Kranjska Gora	Women's teams C4

Federica Cudia (born 16 December 1989) is a former Italian para table tennis player who competed at international level events. She is a silver medalist at the 2008 Summer Paralympics and the 2010 World Championships where she competed along with Michela Brunelli, Pamela Pezzutto and Clara Podda, she is also a three-time European team medalist.
