= Stéphanie Mariage =

French para table tennis player

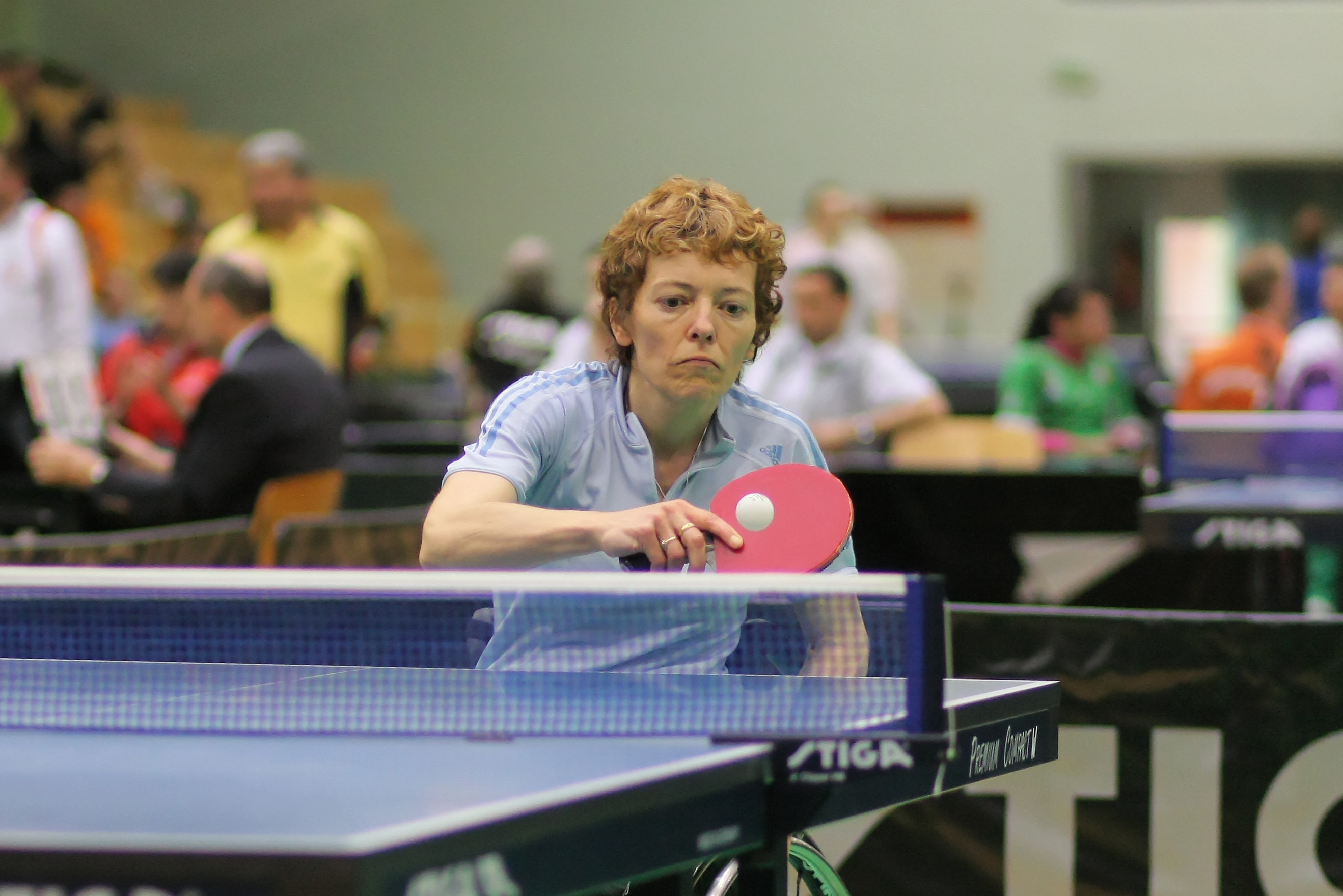

Personal information
- Born: 3 April 1966 (age 60) Villers-Semeuse, France

Sport
- Country: France
- Sport: Para table tennis
- Disability class: C3
- Retired: 2013
Medal record
Para table tennis
Representing France
Paralympic Games
Gold medal – first place	2000 Sydney	Women's team C1-3
Gold medal – first place	2004 Athens	Women's team C2-3
Silver medal – second place	2004 Athens	Women's singles C3
Bronze medal – third place	2008 Beijing	Women's team C1-3
World Championships
Gold medal – first place	2002 Taipei	Women's team C1-3
Silver medal – second place	2006 Montreux	Women's team C1-3
Bronze medal – third place	1998 Paris	Women's team C1-3
European Championships
Gold medal – first place	2001 Frankfurt	Women's singles C3
Gold medal – first place	2001 Frankfurt	Women's team C2-3
Gold medal – first place	2003 Zagreb	Women's team C1-3
Gold medal – first place	2007 Kranjska Gora	Women's team C2-3
Gold medal – first place	2009 Genoa	Women's team C3
Silver medal – second place	1997 Stockholm	Women's team C1-3
Silver medal – second place	1999 Piešťany	Women's singles C3
Silver medal – second place	1999 Piešťany	Women's team C2-3
Silver medal – second place	2003 Zagreb	Open singles standing
Silver medal – second place	2005 Jesolo	Women's team C1-3
Bronze medal – third place	1999 Piešťany	Women's team C1-3

Stéphanie Mariage (born 3 April 1966) is a French retired para table tennis player who is a double Paralympic champion and a five time European champion in both singles and team events.
