= Marie-Christine Fillou =

French para table tennis player

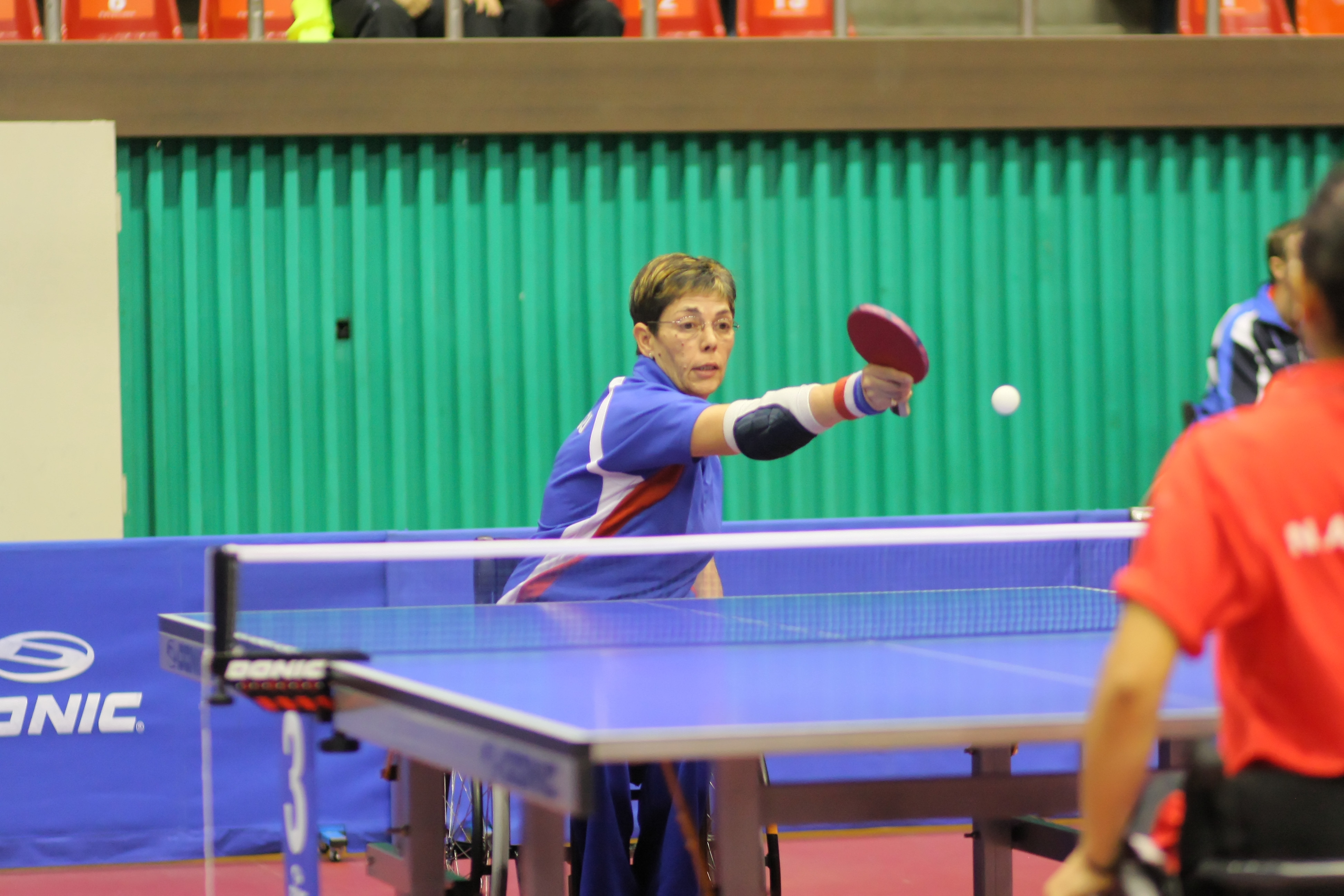
- Marie-Christine Fillou WPTTC 2010

Personal information
- Born: 3 July 1961 (age 64) Tours, France

Sport
- Country: France
- Sport: Para table tennis
- Disability class: C3
- Club: St. Avertin Tennis de Table
- Retired: 2015
Medal record
Para table tennis
Representing France
Paralympic Games
Bronze medal – third place	2008 Beijing	Women's team C1-3
European Championships
Silver medal – second place	2005 Jesolo	Women's team C1-3
Silver medal – second place	2011 Split	Women's team C3

Marie-Christine Fillou née Bourbon (born 3 July 1961) is a retired French para table tennis player. She is a Paralympic bronze medalist and a double European silver medalist.
