= Shooting at the 2008 Summer Paralympics – Mixed 50 metre rifle prone SH1 =

Fifty metre competition

Mixed 50 metre rifle prone SH1 at the XIII Paralympic Games
- Venue: Beijing Shooting Range Hall
- Dates: September 11, 2008
- Competitors: 42 from 24 nations

Medalists
1st place, gold medalist(s)		Jonas Jacobsson	Sweden
2nd place, silver medalist(s)		Zhang Cuiping	China
3rd place, bronze medalist(s)		Dong Chao	China

The Mixed 50 metre rifle prone SH1 event at the 2008 Summer Paralympics took place on September 11 at the Beijing Shooting Range Hall.

== Qualification round ==
Rank	Athlete	Country	1	2	3	4	5	6	Total	Notes
1	Jonas Jacobsson	Sweden	99	100	99	100	98	96	592	Q
2	Ashley Adams	Australia	98	98	97	99	98	100	590	Q
3	Zhang Cuiping	China	98	98	98	99	98	99	590	Q
4	Sergey Nochevnoy	Russia	96	97	99	100	97	98	587	Q
5	Naresh Sharma	India	99	99	99	95	97	98	587	Q
6	Lee Yoo-jeong	South Korea	99	99	98	97	98	96	587	Q
7	Veronika Vadovičová	Slovakia	96	99	96	96	100	99	586	Q
8	Dong Chao	China	94	97	98	100	98	99	586	Q
9	Simon Voit	Germany	95	97	100	98	97	99	586	
10	Doron Shaziri	Israel	98	99	96	97	100	96	586	
11	Josef Johann Neumaier	Germany	97	97	97	99	98	97	585	
12	Erkki Pekkala	Finland	98	97	98	97	97	97	584	
13	Yuriy Stoyev	Ukraine	97	98	97	100	96	96	584	
14	Ab Dulla Al Aryani	United Arab Emirates	97	99	98	99	95	96	584	
15	Christos Trifonidis	Canada	98	96	99	97	99	95	584	
16	Han Tae-ho	South Korea	97	98	96	99	100	94	584	
17	Waldemar Andruszkiewicz	Poland	95	95	98	97	100	98	583	
18	Aki Taguchi	Japan	96	98	97	100	95	97	583	
19	Manuela Schmermund	Germany	97	99	99	95	97	96	583	
20	Azzurra Ciani	Italy	98	97	100	99	94	95	583	
21	Hakan Gustafsson	Sweden	99	96	98	95	96	98	582	
22	Ramezan Salehnejad	Iran	98	98	96	98	95	97	582	
23	Lotta Helsinger	Sweden	95	95	97	98	98	98	581	
24	Didier Richard	France	98	98	98	96	94	97	581	
25	Jozef Siroky	Slovakia	99	96	97	97	97	95	581	
26	Radoslav Malenovsky	Slovakia	95	96	98	98	98	95	580	
27	Jang Sung-won	South Korea	99	96	99	98	94	94	580	
28	Kiyoto Matayoshi	Japan	94	96	96	97	99	97	579	
29	Franc Pinter	Slovenia	95	97	97	98	95	97	579	
30	Veikko Palsamaki	Finland	95	99	96	96	97	96	579	
31	Wang Hongzhi	China	94	95	97	97	97	98	578	
32	Mykola Ovcharenko	Ukraine	94	97	97	95	97	97	577	
33	Libby Kosmala	Australia	96	98	95	96	97	95	577	
34	Carlos Garletti	Brazil	98	93	95	97	94	96	573	
35	Werner Mueller	Austria	94	96	95	94	96	96	571	
36	Miguel Orobitg	Spain	92	97	92	96	95	98	570	
37	Michele Amiel	France	97	96	92	94	95	95	569	
38	Liu Wen-chang	Chinese Taipei	95	92	97	97	93	95	569	
39	Tapani Merilainen	Finland	94	97	93	86	98	98	566	
40	Jolanta Szulc	Poland	90	94	96	95	97	93	565	
41	Helmut Mand	Estonia	94	91	94	95	95	94	563	
42	Iurii Samoshkin	Ukraine	92	91	92	94	91	89	549	

Q Qualified for final

== Final ==
Rank	Athlete	Country	Qual	1	2	3	4	5	6	7	8	9	10	Final	Total	Shoot-off
1	Jonas Jacobsson	Sweden	592	10.4	10.6	10.6	10.4	10.5	9.9	10.8	10.1	10.0	10.5	103.8	695.8	
2	Zhang Cuiping	China	590	10.3	10.9	9.9	10.0	10.4	10.2	10.3	9.9	10.6	10.4	102.9	692.9	
3	Dong Chao	China	586	10.4	10.7	10.6	10.4	10.4	10.2	9.6	10.5	10.1	10.4	103.3	689.3	
4	Ashley Adams	Australia	590	9.2	10.4	9.8	10.7	9.8	9.8	8.9	9.8	10.0	10.1	98.5	688.5	
5	Naresh Sharma	India	587	10.2	10.4	10.6	10.4	10.7	9.4	9.9	9.5	10.1	10.0	101.2	688.2	
6	Sergey Nochevnoy	Russia	587	10.4	9.8	10.1	10.2	10.6	9.9	10.8	9.7	9.2	10.1	100.8	687.8	9.5+10.6
7	Lee Yoo-jeong	South Korea	587	10.5	8.8	10.5	9.8	10.3	9.3	9.9	10.3	10.8	10.6	100.8	687.8	9.5+10.5
8	Veronika Vadovičová	Slovakia	586	10.2	10.5	10.3	9.3	9.7	10.2	10.5	10.3	10.5	9.9	101.4	687.4	
