= Shooting at the 2008 Summer Paralympics – Men's 10 metre air rifle standing SH1 =

Men's 10 metre air rifle standing SH1 at the XIII Paralympic Games
- Venue: Beijing Shooting Range Hall
- Dates: September 8, 2008
- Competitors: 26 from 17 nations

Medalists
1st place, gold medalist(s)		Jonas Jacobsson	Sweden
2nd place, silver medalist(s)		Norbert Gau	Germany
3rd place, bronze medalist(s)		Franc Pinter	Slovenia

The Men's 10 metre air rifle standing SH1 event at the 2008 Summer Paralympics took place on September 8 at the Beijing Shooting Range Hall.

== Qualification round ==
Rank	Athlete	Country	1	2	3	4	5	6	Total	Notes
1	Jonas Jacobsson	Sweden	100	99	99	100	98	100	596	Q
2	Ashley Adams	Australia	98	98	98	100	100	99	593	Q
3	Norbert Gau	Germany	96	99	98	100	99	100	592	Q
4	Josef Johann Neumaier	Germany	98	100	97	99	99	99	592	Q
5	Gou Dingchao	China	97	100	96	99	100	99	591	Q
6	Franc Pinter	Slovenia	98	98	98	99	97	100	590	Q
7	Nathan Milgate	Great Britain	97	95	98	99	99	99	587	Q
8	Cedric Friggeri	France	99	98	97	98	96	99	587	Q
9	Sim Jae-yong	South Korea	98	99	96	97	99	98	587	
10	Jang Sung-won	South Korea	95	99	100	96	98	98	586	
11	Ramezan Salehnejad	Iran	98	99	96	98	97	98	586	
12	Dong Chao	China	97	97	96	97	98	100	585	
13	Didier Richard	France	97	96	100	98	97	94	582	
14	Werner Mueller	Austria	98	95	99	95	95	98	580	
15	Yuriy Stoyev	Ukraine	99	98	98	94	97	94	580	
16	Hakan Gustafsson	Sweden	96	95	97	97	96	98	579	
17	Han Tae-ho	South Korea	94	97	97	95	99	96	578	
18	Matt Skelhon	Great Britain	96	97	96	99	95	95	578	
19	Simon Voit	Germany	96	96	98	95	97	94	576	
20	Kiyoto Matayoshi	Japan	94	93	98	95	97	98	575	
21	Kazimierz Mechula	Denmark	97	95	97	92	98	95	574	
22	Miguel Orobitg	Spain	96	96	95	92	96	98	573	
23	Iurii Samoshkin	Ukraine	94	93	94	97	95	97	570	
24	Liu Wen-chang	Chinese Taipei	95	96	93	94	91	97	566	
25	Jozef Siroky	Slovakia	92	90	95	96	95	97	565	
26	Waldemar Andruszkiewicz	Poland	95	96	88	93	95	96	563	

Q Qualified for final

== Final ==
Rank	Athlete	Country	Qual	1	2	3	4	5	6	7	8	9	10	Final	Total
1	Jonas Jacobsson	Sweden	596	10.6	10.5	10.5	10.1	10.4	10.7	10.9	10.2	10.1	10.5	104.5	700.5
2	Norbert Gau	Germany	592	10.3	10.6	10.5	9.4	10.7	10.4	10.1	9.7	10.0	10.0	101.7	693.7
3	Franc Pinter	Slovenia	590	10.7	10.4	10.3	10.7	10.2	10.1	10.2	9.9	10.7	10.0	103.2	693.2
4	Ashley Adams	Australia	593	10.8	8.4	10.3	10.6	10.2	10.1	10.3	9.4	10.3	9.6	100.0	693.0
5	Josef Johann Neumaier	Germany	592	8.3	9.8	10.4	10.3	10.0	10.1	9.9	9.8	10.9	10.5	100.0	692.0
6	Gou Dingchao	China	591	10.4	9.8	10.3	9.0	10.7	9.3	9.7	10.4	10.6	10.3	100.5	691.5
7	Cedric Friggeri	France	587	10.6	10.2	9.7	10.4	10.3	10.9	9.9	10.5	10.6	9.5	102.6	689.6
8	Nathan Milgate	Great Britain	587	9.3	9.8	9.7	10.6	10.0	10.2	10.6	9.5	9.9	10.3	99.9	686.9
