= Shooting at the 2008 Summer Paralympics – Men's 50 metre rifle 3 positions SH1 =

Men's 50 metre rifle 3 positions at the XIII Paralympic Games
- Venue: Beijing Shooting Range Hall
- Dates: September 10, 2008
- Competitors: 27 from 18 nations

Medalists
1st place, gold medalist(s)		Jonas Jacobsson	Sweden
2nd place, silver medalist(s)		Doron Shaziri	Israel
3rd place, bronze medalist(s)		Dong Chao	China

The Men's 50 metre rifle 3 positions event at the 2008 Summer Paralympics took place on September 10 at the Beijing Shooting Range Hall.

== Qualification round ==
Rank	Athlete	Country	Prone	Standing	Kneeling	Total	Notes
1	Jonas Jacobsson	Sweden	396	375	392	1163	Q
2	Doron Shaziri	Israel	395	383	380	1158	Q
3	Dong Chao	China	393	375	389	1157	Q
4	Franc Pinter	Slovenia	387	374	387	1148	Q
5	Sim Jae-yong	South Korea	392	370	384	1146	Q
6	Jang Sung-won	South Korea	388	377	377	1142	Q
7	Josef Johann Neumaier	Germany	383	376	381	1140	Q
8	Gou Dingchao	China	388	376	375	1139	Q
9	Ashley Adams	Australia	391	374	372	1137	
10	Kiyoto Matayoshi	Japan	386	372	377	1135	
11	Didier Richard	France	387	364	376	1127	
12	Cedric Friggeri	France	384	380	363	1127	
13	Liu Wen-chang	Chinese Taipei	376	372	378	1126	
14	Ab Dulla Al Aryani	United Arab Emirates	388	361	375	1124	
15	Simon Voit	Germany	388	362	373	1123	
16	Hakan Gustafsson	Sweden	387	370	365	1122	
17	Carlos Garletti	Brazil	383	372	361	1116	
18	Miguel Orobitg	Spain	380	363	370	1113	
19	Werner Mueller	Austria	382	364	367	1113	
20	Mykola Ovcharenko	Ukraine	379	363	368	1110	
21	Michael Dickey	United States	382	355	369	1106	
22	Yuriy Stoyev	Ukraine	378	351	376	1105	
23	Norbert Gau	Germany	377	370	357	1104	
24	Jozef Siroky	Slovakia	383	353	359	1095	
25	Iurii Samoshkin	Ukraine	373	354	363	1090	
26	Naresh Sharma	India	384	342	362	1088	
27	Radoslav Malenovsky	Slovakia	389	321	364	1074	

Q Qualified for final

== Final ==
Rank	Athlete	Country	Qual	1	2	3	4	5	6	7	8	9	10	Final	Total
1	Jonas Jacobsson	Sweden	1163	10.4	10.7	9.6	9.8	9.6	9.9	10.6	9.6	10.4	10.7	101.3	1264.3
2	Doron Shaziri	Israel	1158	8.9	10.3	10.3	10.9	10.6	10.2	9.9	10.4	10.5	9.9	101.9	1259.9
3	Dong Chao	China	1157	10.3	9.7	8.8	9.4	8.6	9.6	9.3	10.6	9.4	10.8	96.5	1253.5
4	Franc Pinter	Slovenia	1148	8.5	9.4	10.2	10.5	9.0	9.6	10.0	9.4	9.5	9.5	95.6	1243.6
5	Sim Jae-yong	South Korea	1146	9.9	9.8	8.7	9.7	9.1	10.1	9.9	10.3	9.4	9.2	96.1	1242.1
6	Jang Sung-won	South Korea	1142	9.8	9.9	9.7	9.9	9.7	10.2	10.3	9.1	10.7	9.3	98.6	1240.6
7	Josef Johann Neumaier	Germany	1140	9.2	9.7	10.7	10.3	10.0	10.0	10.0	9.1	9.9	10.0	98.9	1238.9
8	Gou Dingchao	China	1139	9.7	9.1	10.0	10.1	9.9	9.4	10.1	10.7	9.5	9.6	98.1	1237.1
