= Shooting at the 2008 Summer Paralympics – Women's 10 metre air rifle standing SH1 =

Women's 10 metre air rifle standing SH1 at the XIII Paralympic Games
- Venue: Beijing Shooting Range Hall
- Dates: September 7, 2008
- Competitors: 20 from 15 nations

Medalists
1st place, gold medalist(s)		Veronika Vadovičová	Slovakia
2nd place, silver medalist(s)		Manuela Schmermund	Germany
3rd place, bronze medalist(s)		Nilda Gómez López	Puerto Rico

The Women's 10 metre air rifle standing SH1 event at the 2008 Summer Paralympics took place on September 7 at the Beijing Shooting Range Hall. It was the first medal awarded at the 2008 Paralympics Games.

== Qualification round ==
Rank	Athlete	Country	1	2	3	4	Total	Notes
1	Veronika Vadovičová	Slovakia	98	97	99	98	392	Q
2	Libby Kosmala	Australia	97	100	99	94	390	Q
3	Monica Lillehagen	Norway	97	95	97	100	389	Q
4	Manuela Schmermund	Germany	97	95	99	97	388	Q
5	Nilda Gómez López	Puerto Rico	96	95	100	96	387	Q
6	Kim Im-yeon	South Korea	96	96	95	99	386	Q
7	Michele Amiel	France	94	98	97	97	386	Q
8	Lotta Helsinger	Sweden	95	97	97	97	386	Q
9	Lee Yoo-jeong	South Korea	96	96	100	94	386	
10	Deanna Coates	Great Britain	94	98	96	97	385	
11	Zhang Nan	China	97	99	94	95	385	
12	Snežana Nikolić	Serbia	98	97	94	95	384	
13	Zhang Cuiping	China	98	91	98	96	383	
14	Sabine Brogle	Germany	95	96	97	95	383	
15	Suzan Tekin	Turkey	96	94	94	95	379	
16	Wang Tingting	China	93	97	94	94	378	
17	LEE Yun-ri	South Korea	93	98	98	89	378	
18	Azzurra Ciani	Italy	88	95	95	98	376	
19	Danielle Fong	United States	94	94	95	93	376	
20	Izumi Takehi	Japan	93	95	93	94	375	

Q Qualified for final

== Final ==
Rank	Athlete	Country	Qual	1	2	3	4	5	6	7	8	9	10	Final	Total
1	Veronika Vadovičová	Slovakia	392	10.4	10.4	10.5	10.8	10.2	10.4	10.0	10.4	10.2	9.5	102.8	494.8
2	Manuela Schmermund	Germany	388	10.5	10.2	10.2	10.6	9.8	10.7	9.7	10.5	9.9	10.1	102.2	490.2
3	Nilda Gómez López	Puerto Rico	387	9.9	10.6	9.7	10.5	10.8	10.5	10.1	9.5	10.2	10.4	102.2	489.2
4	Libby Kosmala	Australia	390	9.2	10.2	10.0	9.7	10.3	9.4	10.3	9.7	10.2	10.1	99.1	489.1
5	Monica Lillehagen	Norway	389	9.4	9.9	10.5	10.3	9.2	8.8	10.5	10.2	10.0	10.5	99.3	488.3
6	Lotta Helsinger	Sweden	386	9.9	10.5	10.4	10.2	10.5	9.8	10.2	8.9	10.6	10.2	101.2	487.2
7	Kim Im-yeon	South Korea	386	10.7	9.7	9.4	10.1	10.1	10.0	10.3	10.2	10.0	9.8	100.3	486.3
8	Michele Amiel	France	386	9.5	10.2	9.4	9.6	10.3	9.8	9.7	10.3	9.2	9.8	97.8	483.8
