= Shooting at the 2008 Summer Paralympics – Women's 50 metre rifle 3 positions SH1 =

Women's 50 metre rifle 3 positions SH1 at the XIII Paralympic Games
- Venue: Beijing Shooting Range Hall
- Dates: September 9, 2008
- Competitors: 17 from 12 nations

Medalists
1st place, gold medalist(s)		Lee Yun-ri	South Korea
2nd place, silver medalist(s)		Kim Im-yeon	South Korea
3rd place, bronze medalist(s)		Zhang Cuiping	China

The Women's 50 metre rifle 3 positions SH1 event at the 2008 Summer Paralympics took place on September 9 at the Beijing Shooting Range Hall.

== Qualification round ==
Rank	Athlete	Country	1	2	PR	3	4	ST	5	6	KN	Total	Notes
1	Lee Yun-ri	South Korea	98	97	195	95	93	188	98	98	196	579	Q
2	Zhang Cuiping	China	99	95	194	94	95	189	96	96	192	575	Q
3	Kim Im-yeon	South Korea	98	97	195	95	93	188	90	98	188	571	Q
4	Veronika Vadovičová	Slovakia	96	96	192	91	92	183	97	98	195	570	Q
5	Lee Yoo-jeong	South Korea	97	96	193	97	96	193	92	92	184	570	Q
6	Lotta Helsinger	Sweden	97	96	193	91	93	184	96	95	191	568	Q
7	Manuela Schmermund	Germany	96	98	194	94	98	192	90	91	181	567	Q
8	Zhang Nan	China	94	99	193	93	93	186	97	88	185	564	Q
9	Libby Kosmala	Australia	98	94	192	91	90	181	89	94	183	556	
10	Wang Tingting	China	95	97	192	94	86	180	90	92	182	554	
11	Michele Amiel	France	98	94	192	82	92	174	91	92	183	549	
12	Sabine Brogle	Germany	93	96	189	89	95	184	94	81	175	548	
13	Izumi Takehi	Japan	96	94	190	89	87	176	93	86	179	545	
14	Jolanta Szulc	Poland	92	96	188	89	89	178	87	90	177	543	
15	Snežana Nikolić	Serbia	96	97	193	78	83	161	94	94	188	542	
16	Danielle Fong	United States	95	98	193	85	86	171	90	88	178	542	
17	Nilda Gómez López	Puerto Rico	94	93	187	90	92	182	85	82	167	536	

Q Qualified for final

== Final ==
Rank	Athlete	Country	Qual	1	2	3	4	5	6	7	8	9	10	Final	Total
1	Lee Yun-ri	South Korea	579	9.3	10.6	10.2	10.2	10.0	10.0	9.3	9.2	9.0	10.1	97.9	676.9
2	Kim Im-yeon	South Korea	571	9.6	10.5	10.3	10.4	10.6	9.0	9.7	9.0	10.5	10.4	100.0	671.0
3	Zhang Cuiping	China	575	8.1	9.0	9.8	10.1	10.4	9.4	10.4	8.3	9.1	9.0	93.6	668.6
4	Veronika Vadovičová	Slovakia	570	9.7	10.0	9.3	10.3	10.1	9.8	9.8	8.7	10.0	10.1	97.8	667.8
5	Lee Yoo-jeong	South Korea	570	9.5	10.6	9.0	9.3	10.5	10.5	8.2	10.5	10.4	7.6	96.1	666.1
6	Manuela Schmermund	Germany	567	9.4	10.1	9.0	9.3	9.6	10.5	9.6	8.8	10.5	9.4	96.2	663.2
7	Lotta Helsinger	Sweden	568	8.3	10.6	7.3	9.1	9.5	8.7	9.0	10.0	9.4	10.0	91.9	659.9
8	Zhang Nan	China	564	9.6	8.2	7.9	9.7	9.5	10.1	8.9	9.3	8.0	10.1	91.3	655.3
