= Shooting at the 2008 Summer Paralympics =

Shooting at the XIII Paralympic Games
- Paralympic Shooting
- Venue: Beijing Shooting Range Hall
- Dates: 7–12 September 2008

Shooting at the 2008 Summer Paralympics consisted of twelve events. The competition was held in the Beijing Shooting Range Hall from 7 September to 12 September.

== Classification ==
Paralympic shooters are classified according to the extent of their disability. The classification system allows shooters to compete against others with a similar level of function.

Shooting classifications are:

- SH1 - competitors who do not need a shooting stand
- SH2 - competitors who use a shooting stand to support the firearm's weight.

== Events ==
For each of the events below, medals were contested for one or more of the above classifications. After each classification is given the date that the event was contested.

- Men's 10 m air pistol
  - SH1 - 7 September
- Men's 10 m air rifle standing
  - SH1 - 8 September
- Men's 50 m free rifle 3×40
  - SH1 - 10 September
- Women's 10 m air pistol
  - SH1 - 8 September
- Women's 10 m air rifle standing
  - SH1 - 7 September
- Women's 50 m sport rifle 3×20
  - SH1 - 9 September
- Mixed 25 m sport pistol
  - SH1 - 10 September
- Mixed 50 m free pistol
  - SH1 - 12 September
- Mixed 10 m air rifle prone
  - SH1 - 11 September
  - SH2 - 9 September
- Mixed 10 m air rifle standing
  - SH2 - 11 September
- Mixed 50 m free rifle prone
  - SH1 - 12 September

== Participating countries ==
There were 140 athletes (96 male, 44 female) from 44 nations taking part in this sport.

- Australia (4)
- Austria (3)
- Azerbaijan (1)
- Bosnia and Herzegovina (1)
- Brazil (1)
- Canada (2)
- China (13)
- Chinese Taipei (2)
- Croatia (3)
- Cyprus (1)
- Czech Republic (1)
- Denmark (3)
- Estonia (1)
- Finland (4)
- France (7)
- Germany (10)
- Great Britain (4)
- Greece (3)
- Hong Kong (1)
- Hungary (1)
- India (1)
- Iran (3)
- Israel (1)
- Italy (5)
- Japan (5)
- Macedonia (2)
- Mongolia (1)
- New Zealand (1)
- Norway (1)
- Poland (5)
- Puerto Rico (1)
- Russia (6)
- Serbia (4)
- Slovakia (3)
- Slovenia (2)
- South Korea (12)
- Spain (3)
- Sweden (5)
- Switzerland (1)
- Thailand (1)
- Turkey (4)
- Ukraine (4)
- United Arab Emirates (1)
- United States (2)

== Medal summary ==
=== Medal table ===
This ranking sorts countries by the number of gold medals earned by their shooters (in this context a nation is an entity represented by a National Paralympic Committee). The number of silver medals is taken into consideration next and then the number of bronze medals. If, after the above, countries are still tied, equal ranking is given and they are listed alphabetically.

| Rank | Nation | Gold | Silver | Bronze | Total |
|---|---|---|---|---|---|
| 1 | South Korea (KOR) | 4 | 3 | 2 | 9 |
| 2 | Sweden (SWE) | 3 | 0 | 1 | 4 |
| 3 | Russia (RUS) | 2 | 1 | 3 | 6 |
| 4 | China (CHN) | 1 | 3 | 3 | 7 |
| 5 | Great Britain (GBR) | 1 | 0 | 0 | 1 |
| 5 | Slovakia (SVK) | 1 | 0 | 0 | 1 |
| 7 | France (FRA) | 0 | 2 | 0 | 2 |
| 7 | Germany (GER) | 0 | 2 | 0 | 2 |
| 9 | Israel (ISR) | 0 | 1 | 0 | 1 |
| 10 | New Zealand (NZL) | 0 | 0 | 1 | 1 |
| 10 | Puerto Rico (PUR) | 0 | 0 | 1 | 1 |
| 10 | Slovenia (SLO) | 0 | 0 | 1 | 1 |
| Totals (12 entries) | | 12 | 12 | 12 | 36 |

=== Medalists ===
| Event | Gold | Silver | Bronze |
|---|---|---|---|
| Men's 10 m air pistol SH1 | Valeriy Ponomarenko; Russia | Sergey Malyshev; Russia | Lee Ju-Hee; South Korea |
| Men's 10 m air rifle standing SH1 | Jonas Jacobsson; Sweden | Norbert Gau; Germany | Franc Pinter; Slovenia |
| Men's 50 m rifle 3×40 | Jonas Jacobsson; Sweden | Doron Shaziri; Israel | Dong Chao; China |
| Women's 10 m air pistol SH1 | Lin Haiyan; China | Moon Aee-Kyung; South Korea | Natalia Dalekova; Russia |
| Women's 10 m air rifle standing SH1 | Veronika Vadovicova; Slovakia | Manuela Schmermund; Germany | Nilda Gomez Lopez; Puerto Rico |
| Women's 50 m rifle 3×20 SH1 | Lee Yun-Ri; South Korea | Kim In-Yeon; South Korea | Zhang Cuiping; China |
| Mixed 25 m pistol SH1 | Andrey Lebedinskiy; Russia | Li Jianfei; China | Valeriy Ponomarenko; Russia |
| Mixed 50 m pistol SH1 | Park Sea-Kyun; South Korea | Lee Ju-Hee; South Korea | Valeriy Ponomarenko; Russia |
| Mixed 10 m air rifle prone SH1 | Matt Skelhon; Great Britain | Zhang Cuiping; China | Sim Jae-Yong; South Korea |
| Mixed 10 m air rifle prone SH2 | Lee Ji-Seok; South Korea | Raphael Voltz; France | Viktoria Wedin; Sweden |
| Mixed 10 m air rifle standing SH2 | Lee Ji-Seok; South Korea | Raphael Voltz; France | Michael Johnson; New Zealand |
| Mixed 50 m rifle prone SH1 | Jonas Jacobsson; Sweden | Zhang Cuiping; China | Dong Chao; China |
