= Shooting at the 2008 Summer Paralympics – Mixed 10 metre air rifle prone SH2 =

Mixed 10 metre air rifle prone SH2 at the XIII Paralympic Games
- Venue: Beijing Shooting Range Hall
- Dates: September 9, 2008
- Competitors: 23 from 16 nations

Medalists
1st place, gold medalist(s)		Lee Ji-seok	South Korea
2nd place, silver medalist(s)		Raphael Voltz	France
3rd place, bronze medalist(s)		Viktoria Wedin	Sweden

The Mixed 10 metre air rifle prone SH2 event at the 2008 Summer Paralympics took place on September 9 at the Beijing Shooting Range Hall.

== Qualification round ==
Rank	Athlete	Country	1	2	3	4	5	6	Total	Notes
1	You Ho-gyoung	South Korea	100	100	100	100	100	100	600	Q
1	Viktoria Wedin	Sweden	100	100	100	100	100	100	600	Q
1	Lee Ji-seok	South Korea	100	100	100	100	100	100	600	Q
4	Damjan Pavlin	Slovenia	99	100	100	100	100	100	599	Q
5	Johnny Andersen	Denmark	100	99	100	100	100	100	599	Q
6	Liu Jie	China	100	100	99	100	100	100	599	Q
7	Raphael Voltz	France	100	100	100	99	100	100	599	Q
8	Jason Maroney	Australia	100	100	100	99	100	100	599	Q
9	Michael Johnson	New Zealand	100	100	100	99	100	100	599	
10	Tanguy de la Forest	France	100	100	100	100	99	100	599	
11	Minna Leinonen	Finland	99	100	99	100	100	100	598	
12	Michael Brengmann	Germany	100	100	99	99	100	100	598	
13	Ivica Bratanovic	Croatia	100	99	99	99	100	100	597	
14	Evangelos Kakosaios	Greece	98	100	100	100	99	100	597	
15	Lone Overbye	Denmark	100	99	100	99	99	100	597	
16	Panagiotis Giannoukaris	Greece	99	100	100	100	99	99	597	
17	Cedric Rio	France	99	100	100	100	98	99	596	
18	Yuan Hongxiang	China	99	99	100	99	100	98	595	
19	James Bevis	Great Britain	100	99	99	100	98	98	594	
20	Sinisa Vidic	Serbia	98	100	100	98	98	99	593	
21	Rudolf Petrovic	Croatia	98	98	98	99	99	99	591	
22	Izudin Husanovic	Bosnia and Herzegovina	97	97	99	97	98	97	585	
23	Yukiko Kinoshita	Japan	98	97	99	96	98	97	585	

Q Qualified for final

== Final ==
Rank	Athlete	Country	Qual	1	2	3	4	5	6	7	8	9	10	Final	Total	Shoot-off
1	Lee Ji-seok	South Korea	600	10.4	10.8	10.6	10.4	10.5	10.3	10.5	10.5	10.7	10.6	105.3	705.3	
2	Raphael Voltz	France	599	10.7	10.6	10.2	10.3	10.4	10.8	10.6	10.9	10.9	10.7	106.1	705.1	
3	Viktoria Wedin	Sweden	600	10.2	10.8	10.3	10.4	10.3	10.4	10.1	10.9	10.2	10.5	104.1	704.1	10.7
4	You Ho-gyoung	South Korea	600	10.8	10.2	10.1	10.5	10.1	10.3	10.6	10.4	10.6	10.5	104.1	704.1	10.6
5	Damjan Pavlin	Slovenia	599	10.9	10.6	10.2	10.6	10.6	10.3	10.6	10.4	10.5	10.3	105.0	704.0	
6	Jason Maroney	Australia	599	10.6	10.6	10.4	10.5	10.7	9.9	10.7	10.4	10.5	10.6	104.9	703.9	
7	Johnny Andersen	Denmark	599	10.0	10.4	10.3	10.4	10.7	10.8	10.4	10.6	10.3	10.9	104.8	703.8	
8	Liu Jie	China	599	10.2	10.4	10.1	10.3	10.7	10.1	10.7	10.3	10.5	10.6	103.9	702.9	
