= Shooting at the 2012 Summer Paralympics – Women's 50 metre rifle 3 positions SH1 =

Women's 50 metre rifle 3 positions SH1 at the XIV Paralympic Games
- Venue: Royal Artillery Barracks
- Dates: 6 September 2012
- Competitors: 14 from 10 nations

Medalists
1st place, gold medalist(s)		Zhang Cuiping	China
2nd place, silver medalist(s)		Dang Shibei	China
3rd place, bronze medalist(s)		Veronika Vadovičová	Slovakia

The Women's 50 metre rifle 3 positions SH1 event at the 2012 Summer Paralympics took place on 6 September at the Royal Artillery Barracks in Woolwich.

The event consisted of two rounds: a qualifier and a final. In the qualifier, each shooter fired 20 shots with a rifle at 50 metres distance from each of the prone, "standing" and kneeling positions. Scores for each shot were in increments of 1, with a maximum score of 10.

The top 8 shooters in the qualifying round moved on to the final round. There, they fired an additional 10 shots in the standing position. These shots scored in increments of .1, with a maximum score of 10.9. The total score from all 70 shots was used to determine final ranking.

== Qualification round ==
Rank	Athlete	Country	1	2	PR	3	4	ST	5	6	KN	Total	Notes
1	Zhang Cuiping	China	97	99	196	96	94	190	94	97	191	577	Q
2	Dang Shibei	China	96	96	192	94	98	192	95	97	192	576	Q
2	Veronika Vadovičová	Slovakia	97	99	196	92	97	189	96	95	191	576	Q
4	Lee Yunri	South Korea	96	100	196	84	96	180	95	96	191	567	Q
5	Manuela Schmermund	Germany	97	95	192	93	91	184	94	96	190	566	Q
6	Jolanta Szulc	Poland	97	97	194	91	90	181	92	94	186	561	Q
7	Karen Butler	Great Britain	99	96	195	87	87	174	95	95	190	559	Q
8	Lee Yoojeong	South Korea	95	96	191	89	89	178	92	95	187	556	Q
9	Wasana Keatjaratkul	Thailand	99	96	195	92	87	179	91	90	181	555	
10	He Huan	China	94	96	190	89	93	182	91	88	179	551	
11	Natascha Hiltrop	Germany	98	97	195	90	85	175	89	86	175	545	
12	Azzurra Ciani	Italy	94	97	191	89	85	174	92	86	178	543	
13	Delphine Fischer	France	95	99	194	80	83	163	78	92	170	527	

Q Qualified for final

== Final ==
Rank	Athlete	Country	Qual	1	2	3	4	5	6	7	8	9	10	Final	Total
1st place, gold medalist(s)	Zhang Cuiping	China	577	8.8	9.5	9.9	10.1	9.4	10.6	10.4	10.3	10.0	10.6	89.0	676.6
2nd place, silver medalist(s)	Dang Shibei	China	576	10.0	10.0	10.0	9.9	8.6	10.0	9.7	10.3	7.7	9.5	86.2	671.7
3rd place, bronze medalist(s)	Veronika Vadovičová	Slovakia	576	10.8	9.6	9.7	8.3	9.5	10.1	8.8	8.9	8.3	9.6	84.0	669.6
4	Lee Yunri	South Korea	567	10.0	10.2	10.1	10.0	10.1	10.2	9.4	10.4	10.6	10.6	91.0	668.6
5	Manuela Schmermund	Germany	566	10.0	9.9	10.3	8.2	9.3	10.4	7.5	8.4	10.5	9.8	84.5	660.3
6	Jolanta Szulc	Poland	561	10.4	7.8	8.4	9.1	9.8	7.4	9.1	9.3	7.0	10.0	78.3	649.3
7	Karen Butler	Great Britain	559	8.9	9.5	8.6	7.2	8.9	10.2	10.0	10.6	9.5	8.4	83.4	650.8
8	Lee Yoojeong	South Korea	556	9.7	6.9	10.0	10.6	8.3	8.6	9.2	9.7	9.7	9.8	82.7	648.5
