= South Korea at the 2008 Summer Paralympics =

- IPC code: KOR
- NPC: Korean Paralympic Committee
- Website: www.kosad.or.kr (in Korean)

in Beijing
- Competitors: 79 in 13 sports
- Flag bearer: Park Jong-Chul
- Officials: 54
- Medals Ranked 13th: Gold 10 Silver 8 Bronze 13 Total 31

Summer Paralympics appearances (overview)
- 1968; 1972; 1976; 1980; 1984; 1988; 1992; 1996; 2000; 2004; 2008; 2012; 2016; 2020; 2024

South Korea competed at the 2008 Summer Paralympics in Beijing, China. The country's delegation consisted of 79 competitors and 54 officials.

Among the competitors were world record holders Park Jong-chul in powerlifting, Min Byeong-eon in swimming and Hong Suk-man in athletics. The team's athletics (track and field) director was Yu Hee-sang. Other members of the team included wheelchair racers Hong Duk-ho and Yoo Byung-hoon. The group left for Beijing on September 1, five days before the start of the games.

== Medallists ==
Medal	Name	Sport	Event
Gold	Cho Hyun-kwan; Kim Hong-kyu; Lee Hong-gu	Archery	Men's team recurve
Gold	Lee Hwa-sook	Archery	Women's individual recurve standing
Gold	Hong Suk-man	Athletics	Men's 400m T53
Gold	Park Keon-woo	Boccia	Mixed individual BC3
Gold	Jeong Ho-won; Park Keon-woo; Shin Bo-Mee	Boccia	Mixed pairs BC3
Gold	Lee Yun-ri	Shooting	Women's 50m rifle 3 positions SH1
Gold	Park Sea-kyun	Shooting	Mixed 50m pistol SH1
Gold	Lee Ji-seok	Shooting	Mixed 10m air rifle prone SH2
Gold	Lee Ji-seok	Shooting	Mixed 10m air rifle standing SH2
Gold	Jung Eun-chang; Kim Byoung-Young	Table tennis	Men's team class 4-5
Silver	Kim Ki-hee; Kim Ran-Sook; Lee Hwa-Sook	Archery	Women's team recurve
Silver	Yong-Sik Jin	Cycling	Men's individual pursuit CP3
Silver	Moon Aee-kyung	Shooting	Women's 10m air pistol SH1
Silver	Kim Im-yeon	Shooting	Women's 50m rifle 3 positions SH1
Silver	Lee Ju-hee	Shooting	Mixed 50m pistol SH1
Silver	Min Byeong-eon	Swimming	Men's 50m backstroke S3
Silver	Cho Jae-kwan	Table tennis	Men's singles class 1
Silver	Jung Eun-chang	Table tennis	Men's singles class 4-5
Bronze	Hong Suk-man	Athletics	Men's 200m T53
Bronze	Hong Suk-man	Athletics	Men's 800m T53
Bronze	Hong Suk-man; Jung Dong-ho; Kim Gyu-dae; Yoo Byung-hoon	Athletics	Men's 4x100m relay T53-54
Bronze	Jeong Ho-won	Boccia	Mixed individual BC3
Bronze	Yong-Sik Jin	Cycling	Men's time trial CP3
Bronze	Jung Keum-jong	Powerlifting	Men's 56kg
Bronze	Lee Ju-hee	Shooting	Men's 10m air pistol SH1
Bronze	Sim Jae-yong	Shooting	Mixed 10m air rifle prone SH1
Bronze	Min Byeong-eon	Swimming	Men's 50m freestyle S3
Bronze	Lee Hae-kon	Table tennis	Men's singles class 1
Bronze	Kim Kyung-mook	Table tennis	Men's singles class 2
Bronze	Cho Jae-kwan; Kim Kong-yong; Kim Kyung-mook; Lee Hae-kon	Table tennis	Men's team class 1-2
Bronze	Moon Sung-hye	Table tennis	Women's singles class 4

== Sports ==
=== Archery ===
==== Men ====
Athlete	Event	Ranking round		Round of 32	Round of 16	Quarterfinals	Semifinals	Finals	
Athlete	Event	Score	Seed	Opposition score	Opposition score	Opposition score	Opposition score	Opposition score	Rank
Go Sung Kil	Men's individual compound open	680	4	Bye	Heary (IRL); L 112-113	did not advance			
Kweon Hyun Ju	Men's individual compound open	662	17	Bennett (USA); L 106-106*	did not advance				
Lee Ouk Soo	Men's individual compound open	686	2	Bye	Simonelli (ITA); L 112-115	did not advance			
An Seong Pyo	Men's individual compound W1	619	6	—N/a	Sebek (CZE); W 104-100	Cavanagh (GBR); L 104-106	did not advance		
An Tae Sung	Men's individual recurce standing	580	17	Zhu W (CHN); W 96-95	Esposito (ITA); L 98-101	did not advance			
Cho Hyun Kwan	Men's individual recurce standing	625	4	Bye	Meunier (FRA); L 96-101	did not advance			
Yoon Young Bae	Men's individual recurce standing	594	15	Kopiy (UKR); L 91-102	did not advance				
Jung Young Joo	Men's individual recurve W1/W2	616	9	Marin (ESP); W 102-88	Sidik (MAS); W 106-94	Ozen (TUR); L 102-103	did not advance		
Kim Hong Kyu	Men's individual recurve W1/W2	632	2	Bye	Sawicki (POL); L 99-104	did not advance			
Lee Hong Gu	Men's individual recurve W1/W2	629	3	Karaphillides (GBR); W 105-80	Browne (GBR); W 108-103	Tseng L H (TPE); L 104-105	did not advance		
Cho Hyun Kwan; Kim Hong Kyu; Lee Hong Gu	Men's team recurve	1886 WR	1	—N/a	Bye	Ukraine (UKR); W 188-187	Japan (JPN); W 201-188	China (CHN); W 209-206	1st place, gold medalist(s)

* - Kweon Hyun Ju's round of 32 match against Eric Bennett was decided by additional arrows: Kweon won 9, 8 while Bennett scored 9, 9. Bennett succeeded through to the next round.

==== Women ====
Athlete	Event	Ranking round		Round of 32	Round of 16	Quarterfinals	Semifinals	Finals	
Athlete	Event	Score	Seed	Opposition score	Opposition score	Opposition score	Opposition score	Opposition score	Rank
Kim Ki Hee	Women's individual recurve standing	567	5	Bye	Konishi (JPN); W 85-79	Carmichael (USA); L 85-86	did not advance		
Kim Ran Sook	Women's individual recurve standing	564	6	Bye	Olejnik (POL); L 85-98	did not advance			
Lee Hwa Sook	Women's individual recurve standing	614 WR	1	Bye	Yan H (CHN); W 101-97	Salden-Otten (NED); W 107-96	Carmichael (USA); W 101-100	Gao (CHN); W 103-92	1st place, gold medalist(s)
Kim Ki Hee; Kim Ran Sook; Lee Hwa Sook	Women's team recurve	1745	2	—N/a		Great Britain (GBR); W 178-161	Czech Republic (CZE); W 199-184	China (CHN); L 177-205	2nd place, silver medalist(s)

=== Athletics ===
==== Men's track ====
Athlete	Class	Event	Heats		Semifinal		Final	
Athlete	Class	Event	Result	Rank	Result	Rank	Result	Rank
Hong Duk-Ho	T53	800m	1:41.59	10	did not advance			
Hong Suk-Man	T53	200m	27.02	3 Q	—N/a		26.87	3rd place, bronze medalist(s)
Hong Suk-Man	T53	400m	49.13 PR	1 Q	—N/a		47.67 WR	1st place, gold medalist(s)
Hong Suk-Man	T53	800m	1:39.52	5 Q	—N/a		1:37.45	3rd place, bronze medalist(s)
Jung Dong-Ho	T53	100m	15.82	9	did not advance			
Jung Dong-Ho	T53	400m	53.47	9	did not advance			
Kim Gyu-Dae	T54	200m	26.12	10	did not advance			
Lee Yun-Oh	T54	Marathon	—N/a				1:38:44	31
Yoo Byung-Hoon	T53	400m	52.19	3 Q	—N/a		49.84	4
Yoo Byung-Hoon	T53	800m	1:38.65	3 Q	—N/a		1:37.80	7
Yoo Byung-Hoon	T53	1500m	3:10.24	16 q	DNS		did not advance	
Hong Suk-Man; Jung Dong-Ho; Kim Gyu-Dae; Yoo Byung-Hoon	T53-T54	4x100m relay	52.67	4 Q	—N/a		53.52	3rd place, bronze medalist(s)
Hong Suk-Man; Jung Dong-Ho; Kim Gyu-Dae; Yoo Byung-Hoon	T53-T54	4x400m relay	3:18.98	3 Q	—N/a		DSQ	

==== Men's field ====
Athlete	Class	Event	Final		
Athlete	Class	Event	Result	Points	Rank
Park Se Ho	F32	Shot put	6.93	-	5

==== Women's track ====
Athlete	Class	Event	Heats		Final	
Athlete	Class	Event	Result	Rank	Result	Rank
Jeon Min-Jae	T36	100m	—N/a		15.67	6
Jeon Min-Jae	T36	200m	—N/a		32.62	4

=== Boccia ===
Athlete	Event	Preliminaries			Quarterfinals	Semifinals	Final	
Athlete	Event	Opponent	Opposition Score	Rank	Opposition Score	Opposition Score	Opposition Score	Rank
Park Jae Suk	Mixed individual BC1	Shelly (IRL)	W 5-3	2 Q	J P Fernandes (POR); L 2-3	did not advance		
Park Jae Suk	Mixed individual BC1	Richardson (CAN)	L 0-7	2 Q	J P Fernandes (POR); L 2-3	did not advance		
Park Jae Suk	Mixed individual BC1	Ibarbure (ARG)	W 5-2	2 Q	J P Fernandes (POR); L 2-3	did not advance		
Park Jae Suk	Mixed individual BC1	Kitani (JPN)	W 8-4	2 Q	J P Fernandes (POR); L 2-3	did not advance		
Jeong Ho Won	Mixed individual BC3	Peixoto (POR)	W 6-0	1 Q	Pesquera (ESP); W 8-0	Polychronidis (GRE); L 1-4	Peixoto (POR); W 12-0	3rd place, bronze medalist(s)
Jeong Ho Won	Mixed individual BC3	Visaratanunta (THA)	W 5-3	1 Q	Pesquera (ESP); W 8-0	Polychronidis (GRE); L 1-4	Peixoto (POR); W 12-0	3rd place, bronze medalist(s)
Jeong Ho Won	Mixed individual BC3	Slade (NZL)	W 14-0	1 Q	Pesquera (ESP); W 8-0	Polychronidis (GRE); L 1-4	Peixoto (POR); W 12-0	3rd place, bronze medalist(s)
Park Keon Woo	Mixed individual BC3	Shen (CHN)	W 5-2	1 Q	Shin (KOR); W 8-0	Peixoto (POR); W 4-3	Polychronidis (GRE); W 3-2	1st place, gold medalist(s)
Park Keon Woo	Mixed individual BC3	Martino (CAN)	W 7-2	1 Q	Shin (KOR); W 8-0	Peixoto (POR); W 4-3	Polychronidis (GRE); W 3-2	1st place, gold medalist(s)
Park Keon Woo	Mixed individual BC3	Punsnit (THA)	W 8-2	1 Q	Shin (KOR); W 8-0	Peixoto (POR); W 4-3	Polychronidis (GRE); W 3-2	1st place, gold medalist(s)
Shin Bo Mee	Mixed individual BC3	J M Rodriguez (ESP)	W 14-0	1 Q	Park K W (KOR); L 0-8	did not advance		
Shin Bo Mee	Mixed individual BC3	Jackson (NZL)	W 6-2	1 Q	Park K W (KOR); L 0-8	did not advance		
Shin Bo Mee	Mixed individual BC3	Zhu J (CHN)	W 3-2	1 Q	Park K W (KOR); L 0-8	did not advance		
Jeong Ho Won; Park Keon Woo; Shin Bo Mee	Mixed pairs BC3	Martin (ESP); Pesquera (ESP); J M Rodriguez (ESP)	W 9-3	1 Q	—N/a	Thailand (THA) (Punsnit, Sukkarath, Visaratanunta); W 15-0	Spain (ESP) (Martin, Pesquera, J M Rodriguez); W 8-1	1st place, gold medalist(s)
Jeong Ho Won; Park Keon Woo; Shin Bo Mee	Mixed pairs BC3	P Gauthier (CAN); Kabush (CAN); Martino (CAN)	W 9-1	1 Q	—N/a	Thailand (THA) (Punsnit, Sukkarath, Visaratanunta); W 15-0	Spain (ESP) (Martin, Pesquera, J M Rodriguez); W 8-1	1st place, gold medalist(s)
Jeong Ho Won; Park Keon Woo; Shin Bo Mee	Mixed pairs BC3	Shen (CHN); Zhu H (CHN); Zhu J (CHN)	W 9-2	1 Q	—N/a	Thailand (THA) (Punsnit, Sukkarath, Visaratanunta); W 15-0	Spain (ESP) (Martin, Pesquera, J M Rodriguez); W 8-1	1st place, gold medalist(s)

=== Cycling ===
==== Men's road ====
Athlete	Event	Time	Rank
Cho Hang-duk	Men's road race HC B	1:38:09	13
Cho Hang-duk	Men's road time trial HC B	25:50.09	15
Jin Yong-sik	Men's road race LC3/LC4/CP3	1:38:13	9
Jin Yong-sik	Men's road time trial CP3	38:45.83	3rd place, bronze medalist(s)

==== Men's track ====
Athlete	Event	Qualification		1st round		Final	
Athlete	Event	Time	Rank	Time	Rank	Opposition Time	Rank
Jin Yong-sik	Men's individual pursuit CP3	3:58.817	2 Q	—N/a		Kenny (GBR); L OVL	2nd place, silver medalist(s)

=== Football 5-a-side ===
The men's football team didn't win any medals; they were 6th out 6 teams.

==== Players ====
- Hur Suk
- Ji Jun Min
- Jo Woo Hyung
- Kim Jae Sik
- Kim Jung Hoon
- Kim Kyung Ho
- Lee Jin Won
- Oh Yong Kyun
- Park Meong Su
- Yoon Jong Suk

==== Tournament ====
7 September 2008
13:30

Brazil	3 - 0	South Korea

Olympic Green Hockey Field
9 September 2008
9:00

South Korea	1 - 2	Great Britain

Olympic Green Hockey Field
11 September 2008
11:00

China	1 - 0	South Korea

Olympic Green Hockey Field
Attendance: 1,995
Referee: Ricardo Torino (Argentina)
13 September 2008
13:00

South Korea	0 - 2	Argentina

Olympic Green Hockey Field
15 September 2008
11:00

Spain	2 - 2	South Korea

Olympic Green Hockey Field

5th-6th classification

17 September 2008
9:00

South Korea	1 - 1 (a.e.t.)	Great Britain
Penalties
	1 - 0

Olympic Green Hockey Field

=== Judo ===
==== Men ====
Athlete	Event	First Round	Quarterfinals	Semifinals	Repechage round 1	Repechage round 2	Final/ Bronze medal contest
Athlete	Event	Opposition Result	Opposition Result	Opposition Result	Opposition Result	Opposition Result	Opposition Result
Park Jung Min	Men's +100kg	Moreno (ESP); W 1100-000	Bye	Zakiyev (AZE); L 0001-1000	—N/a		Dewall (USA); L 0110-1001

=== Powerlifting ===
==== Men ====
Athlete	Event	Result	Rank
Bong Duk-Hwan	75kg	170.0	11
Jung Keum-Jong	56kg	180.0	3rd place, bronze medalist(s)
Park Jong-Chul	90kg	NMR	

==== Women ====
Athlete	Event	Result	Rank
Yun Jin-Kyoung	60kg	72.5	7

=== Rowing ===
Athlete	Event	Heats		Repechage		Final	
Athlete	Event	Time	Rank	Time	Rank	Time	Rank
Lee Jong Rye	Women's single sculls	6:24.04	9 R	7:15.70	8 FB	7:11.48	3

=== Shooting ===
==== Men ====
Athlete	Event	Qualification		Final		
Athlete	Event	Score	Rank	Score	Total	Rank
Han Tae-ho	Men's 10m air rifle standing SH1	578	17	did not advance		
Han Tae-ho	Mixed 10m air rifle prone SH1	598	18	did not advance		
Han Tae-ho	Mixed 50m rifle prone SH1	584	16	did not advance		
Jang Sung-won	Men's 10m air rifle standing SH1	586	10	did not advance		
Jang Sung-won	Men's 50m rifle 3 positions SH1	1142	6 Q	98.6	1240.6	6
Jang Sung-won	Mixed 50m rifle prone SH1	580	27	did not advance		
Lee Ji-seok	Mixed 10m air rifle prone SH2	600	1 Q	105.3	705.3	1st place, gold medalist(s)
Lee Ji-seok	Mixed 10m air rifle standing SH2	600	1 Q	104.3	704.3	1st place, gold medalist(s)
Lee Ju-Hee	Men's 10m air pistol SH1	568	4 Q	96.6	664.6	3rd place, bronze medalist(s)
Lee Ju-Hee	Mixed 25m pistol SH1	571	4 Q	195.4	766.4	4
Lee Ju-Hee	Mixed 50m pistol SH1	541	3 Q	89.1	630.1	2nd place, silver medalist(s)
Park Sea-kyun	Men's 10m air pistol SH1	568	3 Q	92.9	660.9	7
Park Sea-kyun	Mixed 50m pistol SH1	552	1 Q	92.9	644.9	1st place, gold medalist(s)
Sim Jae-yong	Men's 10m air rifle standing SH1	587	9	did not advance		
Sim Jae-yong	Men's 50m rifle 3 positions SH1	1146	5 Q	96.1	1242.1	5
Sim Jae-yong	Mixed 10m air rifle prone SH1	599	3 Q	104.8	703.8	3rd place, bronze medalist(s)
You Ho-gyoung	Mixed 10m air rifle prone SH2	600	1 Q	104.1	704.1	4
You Ho-gyoung	Mixed 10m air rifle standing SH2	597	6 Q	104.2	701.2	4

==== Women ====
Athlete	Event	Qualification		Final		
Athlete	Event	Score	Rank	Score	Total	Rank
Bae Young-ee	Women's 10m air pistol SH1	364	7 Q	92.2	456.2	8
Bae Young-ee	Mixed 50m pistol SH1	499	26	did not advance		
Kim Im-yeon	Women's 10m air rifle standing SH1	386	6 Q	100.3	486.3	7
Kim Im-yeon	Women's 50m rifle 3 positions SH1	571	3 Q	100.0	671.0	2nd place, silver medalist(s)
Kim Im-yeon	Mixed 10m air rifle prone SH1	595	30	did not advance		
Lee Yoo-jeong	Women's 10m air rifle standing SH1	386	9	did not advance		
Lee Yoo-jeong	Women's 50m rifle 3 positions SH1	570	5 Q	96.1	666.1	5
Lee Yoo-jeong	Mixed 50m rifle prone SH1	587	6 Q	100.8	687.8	7
Lee Yun-ri	Women's 10m air rifle standing SH1	378	17	did not advance		
Lee Yun-ri	Women's 50m rifle 3 positions SH1	579	1 Q	97.9	676.9	1st place, gold medalist(s)
Moon Aee-kyung	Women's 10m air pistol SH1	374	2 Q	89.2	463.2	2nd place, silver medalist(s)

=== Swimming ===
==== Men ====
Athlete	Class	Event	Heats		Final	
Athlete	Class	Event	Result	Rank	Result	Rank
Lee Kwon Sik	SB4	100m breaststroke	1:52.39	7 Q	2:13.37	8
Lim Woo Guen	SB5	100m breaststroke	1:40.51	5 Q	1:38.98	5
Min Byeong-Eon	S3	50m backstroke	45.85 WR	1 Q	44.80	2nd place, silver medalist(s)
Min Byeong-Eon	S3	50m freestyle	46.71	1 Q	45.75	3rd place, bronze medalist(s)

==== Women ====
Athlete	Class	Event	Heats		Final	
Athlete	Class	Event	Result	Rank	Result	Rank
Choi Na Mi	SB5	100m breaststroke	2:10.96	12	did not advance	
Kim Ji Eun	S7	100m backstroke	1:35.28	8 Q	1:34.31	8
Kim Ji Eun	S7	50m freestyle	37.31	7 Q	DSQ	
Kim Ji Eun	S7	100m freestyle	—N/a		1:18.54	5
Kim Ji Eun	S7	400m freestyle	5:54.76	7 Q	5:51.52	7

=== Table tennis ===
==== Men ====
Athlete	Event	Preliminaries				Round of 16	Quarterfinals	Semifinals	Final / BM	
Athlete	Event	Opposition Result	Opposition Result	Opposition Result	Rank	Opposition Result	Opposition Result	Opposition Result	Opposition Result	Rank
Cho Jae Kwan	Men's singles C1	Vevera (AUT); W 3–2	Y Fernandez (CUB); W 3–2	Kilger (GER); W 3–0	1 Q	—N/a		Ducay (FRA); W 3–1	Vevera (AUT); L 0-3	2nd place, silver medalist(s)
Choi Kyoung Sik	Men's singles C4-5	Segatto (BRA); W 3-0	Krizanec (CRO); W 3-0	—N/a	1 Q	Durand (FRA); L 1-3	did not advance			
Jeyoung Young Ill	Men's singles C3	Merrien (FRA); L 0-3	Lukezic (SLO); W 3-2	—N/a	2	did not advance				
Jung Eun Chang	Men's singles C4-5	Tsang (HKG); W 3-0	Caci (ITA); W 3-0	—N/a	1 Q	Paulsen (NOR); W 3-1	Martin (FRA); W 3-2	Saleh (EGY); W 3-1	Durand (FRA); L 2-3	2nd place, silver medalist(s)
Kim Byoung Young	Men's singles C4-5	Mihalik (SVK); L 2-3	Chang C J (TPE); W 3-0	—N/a	2	did not advance				
Kim Jeong Seok	Men's singles C3	Gurtler (GER); L 1-3	Wu C S (TPE); W 3-1	—N/a	2	did not advance				
Kim Kong Yong	Men's singles C2	Molliens (FRA); L 1-3	Poddubnyy (RUS); L 2-3	Ahmed (LBA); W 3-0	3	did not advance				
Kim Kyung Mook	Men's singles C2	Riapos (SVK); W 3-0	Mennella (FRA); W 3-2	Gao Y (CHN); W 3-0	1 Q	—N/a		Boury (FRA); L 1-3	Hansen (DEN); W 3-1	3rd place, bronze medalist(s)
Kim Young Gun	Men's singles C3	Zhao P (CHN); W 3-2	Lisav (SLO); W 3-2	—N/a	1 Q	—N/a	Feng P (CHN); L 2-3	did not advance		
Lee Hae Kon	Men's singles C1	Ducay (FRA); W 3-2	Nikelis (GER); W 3-2	Trujillo (CUB); W 3-0	1 Q	—N/a		Vevera (AUT); L 1-3	Ducay (FRA); W 3-1	3rd place, bronze medalist(s)

==== Women ====
Athlete	Event	Preliminaries				Semifinals	Final / BM	
Athlete	Event	Opposition Result	Opposition Result	Opposition Result	Rank	Opposition Result	Opposition Result	Rank
Choi Hyun Ja	Women's singles C3	Li Q (CHN); L 1–3	Y Silva (CUB); W 3–0	Reynolds (IRL); W 3-1	2	did not advance		
Jung Ji Nam	Women's singles C4	Weinmann (GER); L 0-3	Sacca (ITA); W 3-1	Arenales (MEX); W 3-1	2	did not advance		
Moon Sung Hye	Women's singles C4	Zorzetto (ITA); W 3-0	Obiora (NGR); W 3-0	Robertson (GBR); W 3-0	1 Q	Zhou Y (CHN); L 0-3	Weinmann (GER); W 3-1	3rd place, bronze medalist(s)
Na Yu Rim	Women's singles C6-7	Ovsyannikova (RUS); L 0-3	Safonova (UKR); L 1-3	—N/a	3	did not advance		

==== Teams ====
Athlete	Event	Round of 16	Quarterfinals	Semifinals	Final / BM	
Athlete	Event	Opposition Result	Opposition Result	Opposition Result	Opposition Result	Rank
Cho Jae Kwan; Kim Kong Yong; Kim Kyung Mook; Lee Hae Kon	Men's team C1-2	—N/a	Bye	Slovakia (SVK); L 2-3	Austria (AUT); W 3-0	3rd place, bronze medalist(s)
Kim Jeong Seok; Kim Young Gun	Men's team C3	—N/a	China (CHN); L 1-3	did not advance		
Choi Kyoung Sik; Jung Eun Chang; Kim Byoung Young	Men's team C4-5	—N/a	Sweden (SWE); W 3-2	France (FRA); W 3-2	China (CHN); W 3-1	1st place, gold medalist(s)
Choi Hyun Ja; Jung Ji Nam; Moon Sung Hye	Women's team C4-5	Italy (ITA); L 1-3	did not advance			

=== Wheelchair fencing ===
==== Men ====
Athlete	Event	Qualification			Round of 16	Quarterfinal	Semifinal	Final / BM	
Athlete	Event	Opposition	Score	Rank	Opposition Score	Opposition Score	Opposition Score	Opposition Score	Rank
Kim Gi Hong	Men's épée B	Shenkevych (UKR)	L 1–5	3 Q	Poleshchuk (RUS); W 15–13	Cratere (FRA); L 13-15	did not advance		
Kim Gi Hong	Men's épée B	Bezyazychny (BLR)	L 3-5	3 Q	Poleshchuk (RUS); W 15–13	Cratere (FRA); L 13-15	did not advance		
Kim Gi Hong	Men's épée B	Mari (ITA)	W 5-2	3 Q	Poleshchuk (RUS); W 15–13	Cratere (FRA); L 13-15	did not advance		
Kim Gi Hong	Men's épée B	Ding (CHN)	W 5-4	3 Q	Poleshchuk (RUS); W 15–13	Cratere (FRA); L 13-15	did not advance		
Kim Gi Hong	Men's épée B	Pluta (POL)	W 5-3	3 Q	Poleshchuk (RUS); W 15–13	Cratere (FRA); L 13-15	did not advance		
Kim Gi Hong	Men's foil B	Hu D (CHN)	L 1-5	6	did not advance				
Kim Gi Hong	Men's foil B	Hui (HKG)	L 0-5	6	did not advance				
Kim Gi Hong	Men's foil B	Szekeres (HUN)	L 1-5	6	did not advance				
Kim Gi Hong	Men's foil B	Komar (UKR)	L 4-5	6	did not advance				
Kim Gi Hong	Men's foil B	Moreno (USA)	L 4-5	6	did not advance				

=== Wheelchair tennis ===
==== Men ====
Athlete	Class	Event	Round of 64	Round of 32	Round of 16	Quarterfinals	Semifinals	Finals
Athlete	Class	Event	Opposition Result	Opposition Result	Opposition Result	Opposition Result	Opposition Result	Opposition Result
Lee Ha-gel	Open	Men's singles	Shevchik (RUS); W 6–1, 6–1	Scheffers (NED); L 2-6, 1-6	did not advance			
Oh Sang-ho	Open	Men's singles	Kruszelnicki (POL); L 2-6, 4-6	did not advance				
Lee Ha-gel; Oh Sang-ho	Open	Men's doubles	—N/a	Pellegrina (SUI) / Schmaeh (SUI); W 6-0, 6-1	Khulongrua (THA) / Kruamai (THA); W 6-2, 6-3	Houdet (FRA) / Jeremiasz (FRA); L 0-6, 0-6	did not advance	

==== Women ====
Athlete	Class	Event	Round of 32	Round of 16	Quarterfinals	Semifinals	Finals
Athlete	Class	Event	Opposition Result	Opposition Result	Opposition Result	Opposition Result	Opposition Result
Hong Young-Suk	Open	Women's singles	Suter-Erath (SUI); W 6–1, 6–1	Homan (NED); L 0-6, 1-6	did not advance		
Hwang Myung-Hee	Open	Women's singles	de Maria (ITA); W 6-2, 6-2	Griffioen (NED); L 1-6, 0-6	did not advance		
Hong Young-Suk; Hwang Myung-Hee	Open	Women's doubles	—N/a	Dong (CHN) / Hu D (CHN); L 1-6, 3-6	did not advance		
