= Slovakia at the 2008 Summer Paralympics =

- IPC code: SVK
- NPC: Slovak Paralympic Committee
- Website: www.spv.sk

in Beijing
- Competitors: 36 in 10 sports
- Medals Ranked 39th: Gold 2 Silver 3 Bronze 1 Total 6

Summer Paralympics appearances (overview)
- 1996; 2000; 2004; 2008; 2012; 2016; 2020; 2024

Other related appearances
- Czechoslovakia (1972–1992)

Slovakia competed at the 2008 Summer Paralympics in Beijing.

Slovak competitors won medals in table tennis, shooting, and cycling.

== Medallists ==
Medal	Name	Sport	Event	Date
Gold	Veronika Vadovicova	Shooting	Women's 10m air rifle standing SH1	September 7
Gold	Rastislav Revucky; Jan Riapos	Table tennis	Men's team class 1-2	September 15
Silver	Rastislav Turecek	Cycling	Men's time trial HC A	September 12
Silver	Miroslav Jambor; Richard Csejtey	Table tennis	Men's team class 6-8	September 16
Silver	Alena Kanova	Table tennis	Women's individual class 3	September 10
Bronze	Miroslav Jambor	Table tennis	Men's individual class 8	September 11

== Sports ==
=== Archery ===
==== Men ====
Athlete	Event	Ranking round		Round of 32	Round of 16	Quarterfinals	Semifinals	Finals	
Athlete	Event	Score	Seed	Opposition score	Opposition score	Opposition score	Opposition score	Opposition score	Rank
Imrich Lyocsa	Men's individual recurve standing	602	10	Atamanenko (UKR); W 95-73	Hasegawa (JPN); W 100-94	Chen Y (CHN); L 95-98	did not advance		
Vladimir Majercak	Men's individual recurve standing	546	22	Beard (GBR); L 87-88	did not advance				
Miroslav Kacina	Men's individual recurve W1/W2	566	21	Mat Zin (MAS); L 83-96	did not advance				
Miroslav Kacina; Imrich Lyocsa; Vladimir Majercak	Men's team recurve	1714	9	—N/a	Ukraine (UKR); L 181-185	did not advance			

=== Athletics ===
==== Men's field ====
Athlete	Class	Event	Final		
Athlete	Class	Event	Result	Points	Rank
Andrej Germic	F53-54	Shot put	8.84 SB	910	13
Julius Hutka	F57-58	Javelin throw	35.98 SB	927	8
Julius Hutka	F57-58	Shot put	12.21	910	9
Marek Margoc	F40	Shot put	9.90	-	6
Adrian Vasko	F55-56	Shot put	10.88 SB	938	10

==== Women's track ====
Athlete	Class	Event	Heats		Semifinal		Final	
Athlete	Class	Event	Result	Rank	Result	Rank	Result	Rank
Hana Kolníková	T12	100m	13.08	8 q	12.87	5 B	12.87	5
Hana Kolníková	T12	200m	26.25	7 q	26.45	7	did not advance	

=== Boccia ===
Athlete	Event	Preliminaries			Quarterfinals	Semifinals	Final	
Athlete	Event	Opponent	Opposition Score	Rank	Opposition Score	Opposition Score	Opposition Score	Rank
Robert Durkovic	Mixed individual BC4	Ni (CHN)	L 1-5	3	did not advance			
Robert Durkovic	Mixed individual BC4	Leung Y K (HKG)	L 4-7	3	did not advance			
Robert Durkovic	Mixed individual BC4	Streharsky (SVK)	W 4-3	3	did not advance			
Martin Streharsky	Mixed individual BC4	Ni (CHN)	L 2-8	4	did not advance			
Martin Streharsky	Mixed individual BC4	Leung Y K (HKG)	L 3-4	4	did not advance			
Martin Streharsky	Mixed individual BC4	Durkovic (SVK)	L 3-4	4	did not advance			
Robert Durkovic; Martin Streharsky	Pairs BC4	Dueso (ESP) / Desamparados Baixauli (ESP)	L 1-6	3	did not advance			
Robert Durkovic; Martin Streharsky	Pairs BC4	Pinto (BRA) / E Santos (BRA)	L 0-6	3	did not advance			
Robert Durkovic; Martin Streharsky	Pairs BC4	Beres (HUN) / Gyurkota (HUN)	W 5-4	3	did not advance			

=== Cycling ===
==== Men's road ====
Athlete	Event	Time	Rank
Patrick Chlebo	Men's road race LC1/LC2/CP4	1:46:18	13
Patrick Chlebo	Men's road time trial LC1	38:19.29	12
Rastislav Turecek	Men's road time trial HC A	30:53.09	2nd place, silver medalist(s)
Vladislav Janovjak; Robert Mitosinka (pilot)	Men's road race B&VI 1-3	2:16:54	4
Vladislav Janovjak; Robert Mitosinka (pilot)	Men's road time trial B&VI 1-3	32:57.06	4

==== Men's track ====
Athlete	Event	Qualification		Final	
Athlete	Event	Time	Rank	Opposition Time	Rank
Vladislav Janovjak; Robert Mitosinka (pilot)	Men's individual pursuit B&VI 1-3	4:32.236	7	did not advance	

=== Equestrian ===
Athlete	Horse	Event	Total	
Athlete	Horse	Event	Score	Rank
Katarina Jobbagyova	Timpex Libbeno	Mixed individual championship test grade Ia	61.300	7
Katarina Jobbagyova	Timpex Libbeno	Mixed individual freestyle test grade Ia	58.666	12

=== Powerlifting ===
==== Men ====
Athlete	Event	Result	Rank
Lubos Jancek	100kg	147.5	11

==== Women ====
Athlete	Event	Result	Rank
Maria Bartosova	56kg	70.0	8

=== Shooting ===
==== Men ====
Athlete	Event	Qualification		Final		
Athlete	Event	Score	Rank	Score	Total	Rank
Radoslav Malenovsky	Men's 50m rifle 3 positions SH1	1074	27	did not advance		
Radoslav Malenovsky	Mixed 10m air rifle prone SH1	599	3 Q	104.8	703.8	5
Radoslav Malenovsky	Mixed 50m rifle prone SH1	581	26	did not advance		
Jozef Siroky	Men's 10m air rifle standing SH1	565	25	did not advance		
Jozef Siroky	Men's 50m rifle 3 positions SH1	1095	24	did not advance		
Jozef Siroky	Mixed 10m air rifle prone SH1	596	26	did not advance		
Jozef Siroky	Mixed 50m rifle prone SH1	581	25	did not advance		

==== Women ====
Athlete	Event	Qualification		Final		
Athlete	Event	Score	Rank	Score	Total	Rank
Veronika Vadovičová	Mixed 10m air rifle prone SH1	599	8 Q	104.7	703.7	6
Veronika Vadovičová	Mixed 50m rifle prone SH1	586	7 Q	101.4	687.4	8
Veronika Vadovičová	Women's 10m air rifle standing SH1	392	1 Q	102.8	494.8	1st place, gold medalist(s)
Veronika Vadovičová	Women's 50m rifle 3 positions SH1	570	4 Q	97.8	667.8	4

=== Swimming ===
==== Women ====
Athlete	Class	Event	Heats		Final	
Athlete	Class	Event	Result	Rank	Result	Rank
Viera Mikulasikova	S10	50m freestyle	30.16	8 Q	29.94	8
Viera Mikulasikova	S10	100m freestyle	1:06.57	10	did not advance	
Viera Mikulasikova	S10	100m butterfly	1:16.00	7 Q	1:17.10	8
Viera Mikulasikova	SB9	100m breaststroke	1:29.57	10	did not advance	
Viera Mikulasikova	SM10	200m individual medley	2:44.06	5 Q	2:40.43	4
Karina Petrikovicova	SB12	100m breaststroke	1:35.25	10	did not advance	
Margita Prokeinova	S7	50m butterfly	41.88	7 Q	40.70	7
Margita Prokeinova	S7	50m freestyle	39.23	9	did not advance	
Margita Prokeinova	SM7	200m individual medley	3:29.86	8 Q	3:19.01	5

=== Table tennis ===
==== Men ====
Athlete	Event	Preliminaries				Quarterfinals	Semifinals	Final / BM	
Athlete	Event	Opposition Result	Opposition Result	Opposition Result	Rank	Opposition Result	Opposition Result	Opposition Result	Rank
Richard Csejtey	Men's singles C8	Li M (CHN); W 3-2	Serignat (FRA); L 2-3	Hou T S (TPE); W 3-0	2	did not advance			
Ladislav Gaspar	Men's singles C9-10	Last (NED); L 0-3	Karlsson (SWE); L 1-3	—N/a	3	did not advance			
Miroslav Jambor	Men's singles C8	Glikman (ISR); W 3-2	Ledoux (BEL); L 2-3	Kent (CAN); W 3-2	1 Q	—N/a	Grudzien (POL); L 0-3	Li M (CHN); W 3-2	3rd place, bronze medalist(s)
Jan Kosco	Men's singles C3	Robin (FRA); L 0-3	Quijada (VEN); W 3-0	—N/a	2	did not advance			
Andrej Mészáros	Men's singles C4-5	Paulsen (NOR); L 0-3	Cetin (GER); L 0-3	—N/a	3	did not advance			
Peter Mihalik	Men's singles C4-5	Kim B Y (KOR); W 3-2	Chang C J (TPE); W 3-1	—N/a	1 Q	Durand (FRA); L 0-3	did not advance		
Rastislav Revucky	Men's singles C2	Hansen (DEN); L 1–3	Vilsmaier (GER); W 3–2	Kovalski (BRA); W 3–0	2	did not advance			
Jan Riapos	Men's singles C2	Kim K M (KOR); L 0-3	Mennella (FRA); W 3-0	Gao Y (CHN); W 3-0	2	did not advance			

==== Women ====
Athlete	Event	Preliminaries				Semifinals	Final / BM	
Athlete	Event	Opposition Result	Opposition Result	Opposition Result	Rank	Opposition Result	Opposition Result	Rank
Olga Barbusova	Women's singles C8	Kamkasomphou (FRA); L 0-3	Abrahamsson (SWE); L 0-3	Janeckova (CZE); W 3-1	3	did not advance		
Alena Kanova	Women's singles C3	Bakhtiary (IRI); W 3–0	Mariage (FRA); W 3–0	Ploner (ITA); W 3–0	1 Q	Brunelli (ITA); W 3–1	Li Q (CHN); L 0-3	2nd place, silver medalist(s)

==== Teams ====
Athlete	Event	Round of 16	Quarterfinals	Semifinals	Final / BM	
Athlete	Event	Opposition Result	Opposition Result	Opposition Result	Opposition Result	Rank
Rastislav Revucky; Jan Riapos	Men's team C1-2	—N/a	Cuba (CUB); W 3–0	South Korea (KOR); W 3-2	France (FRA); W 3-0	1st place, gold medalist(s)
Jan Kosco; Andrej Mészáros; Peter Mihalik	Men's team C4-5	Sweden (SWE); L 0-3	did not advance			
Richard Csejtey; Miroslav Jambor	Men's team C6-8	Bye	Spain (ESP); W 3-0	France (FRA); W 3-1	China (CHN); L 0-3	2nd place, silver medalist(s)

=== Wheelchair tennis ===
Athlete	Event	Round of 64	Round of 32	Round of 16	Quarterfinals	Semifinals	Finals
Athlete	Event	Opposition Result	Opposition Result	Opposition Result	Opposition Result	Opposition Result	Opposition Result
David Chabrecek	Men's singles	Houdet (FRA); L 2-6, 0-6	did not advance				
Jozef Felix	Men's singles	Carter (CAN); W 6-4, 6-3	Rydberg (USA); L 4-6, 3-6	did not advance			
Marek Gergely	Men's singles	Gérard (BEL); L 1-6, 0-6	did not advance				
Jozef Felix; Marek Gergely	Men's doubles	—N/a	Phillipson (GBR) / Reid (GBR); W 6-2, 6-2	Ammerlaan (NED) / Stuurman (NED); L 2-6, 2-6	did not advance		

== See also ==
- Slovakia at the Paralympics
- Slovakia at the 2008 Summer Olympics
