= 2008 Summer Paralympics medal table =

List of medals won by Paralympic delegations

2008 Summer Paralympics medals
- Location: Beijing, China

Highlights
- Most gold medals: China (89)
- Most total medals: China (211)
- Medalling NPCs: 76
- Website: http://results.beijing2008.cn/WRMP/ENG/INF/GL/95A/GL0000000.shtml

The front and reverse of each medal from the 2008 Summer Paralympics

The medal table of the 2008 Summer Paralympics ranks the participating National Paralympic Committees (NPCs) by the number of gold medals won by their athletes during the competition. The 2008 Paralympics was the thirteenth Games to be held, a quadrennial competition open to athletes with physical and intellectual disabilities. The games were held in Beijing, People's Republic of China, from 6 September to 17 September 2008.

Some 3,951 athletes from 146 NPCs participated in 472 events in 20 sports, with Burundi, Gabon, Georgia, Haiti and Montenegro making their Paralympic debuts. This set new records for both the number of NPCs competing and the number of athletes overall. The design of the medals was similar to those awarded in the 2008 Summer Olympics, featuring jade discs inserted into the medals themselves, with different color discs included for the three types of medals. A total of 21 designs were submitted from designers from the China Central Academy of Fine Arts, Tsinghua University and the China Banknote Printing and Minting Corporation, with the final design approved in the autumn of 2007.

Athletes from a record 76 NPCs won medals, leaving 70 NPCs without a medal. Athletes from Croatia, Mongolia, Saudi Arabia, Singapore and Venezuela won their first ever gold medals. Host China topped the medal table with 211 medals in total, including 89 gold medals, while Great Britain placed second with 102 medals, including 42 golds. Canadian wheelchair racer Chantal Petitclerc, S9 swimmers Natalie du Toit and Matthew Cowdrey, from South Africa and Australia respectively, each won five gold medals at the 2008 Games. Brazilian S5 swimmer Daniel Dias won the most individual medals overall, a total of nine medals, comprising four golds, four silvers and a bronze.

== Medal table ==
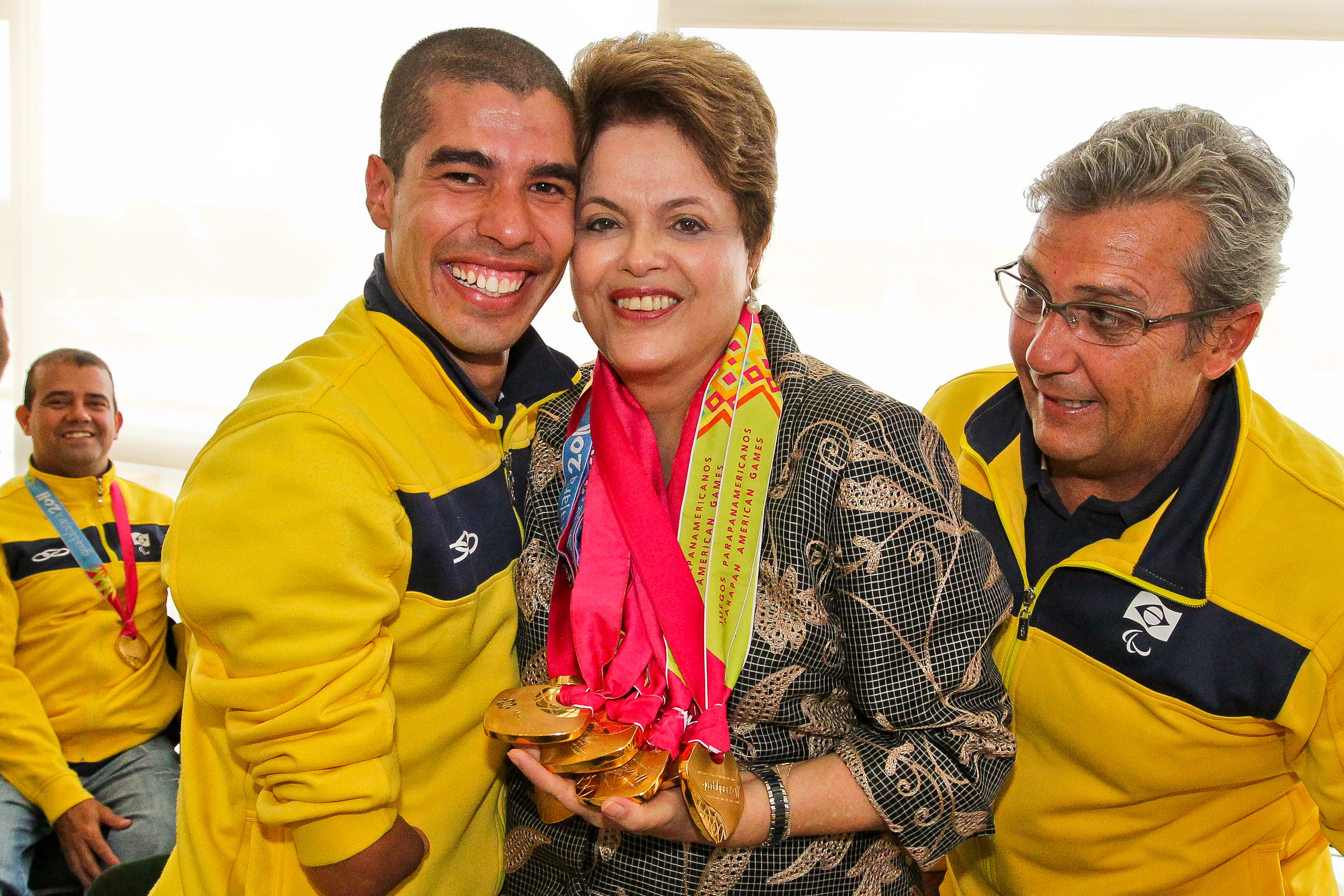
Daniel Dias (center left), who won nine medals overall at the 2008 Games, with President of Brazil Dilma Rousseff

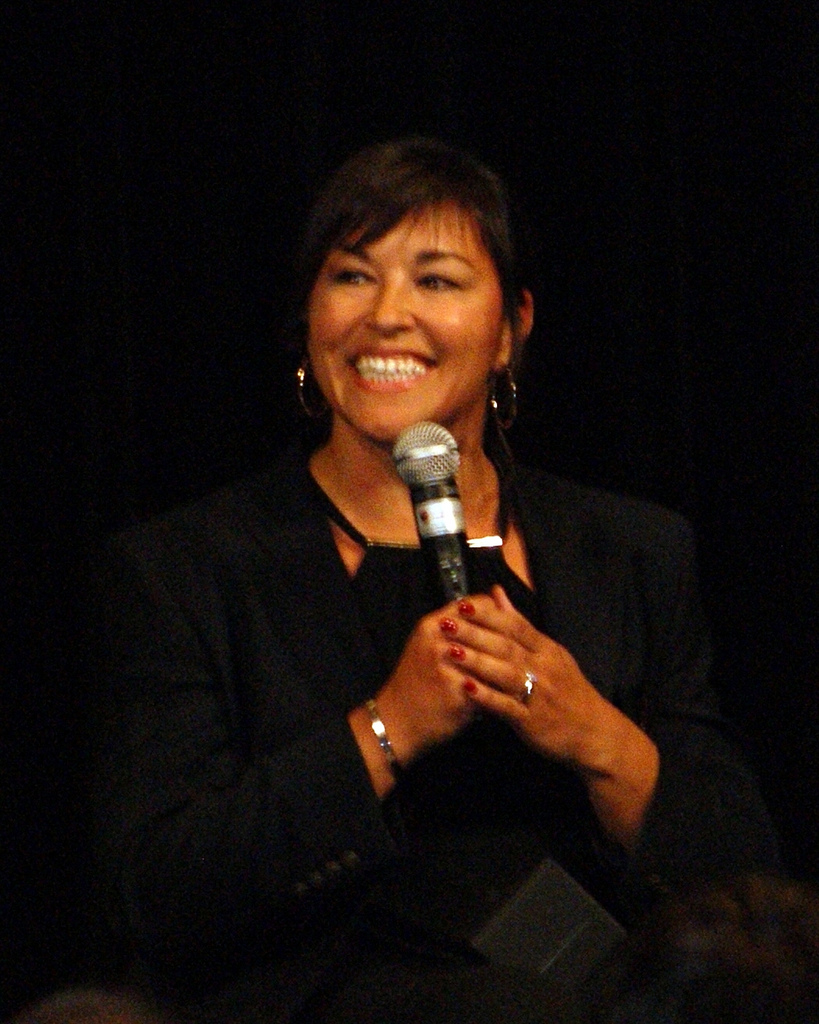
Canadian wheelchair racer Chantal Petitclerc won five gold medals at the 2008 Games.

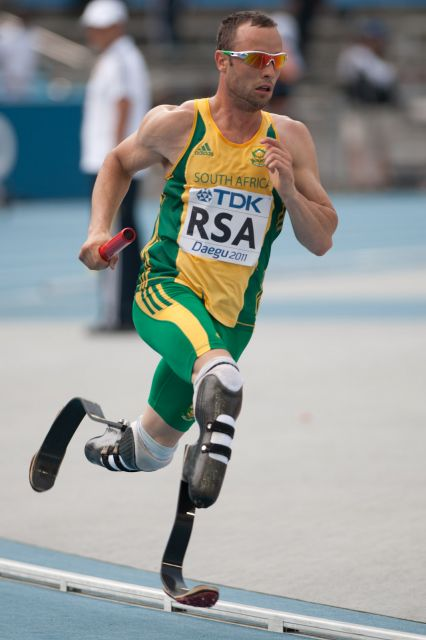
Sprinter Oscar Pistorius won three gold medals for South Africa at the 2008 Paralympics.

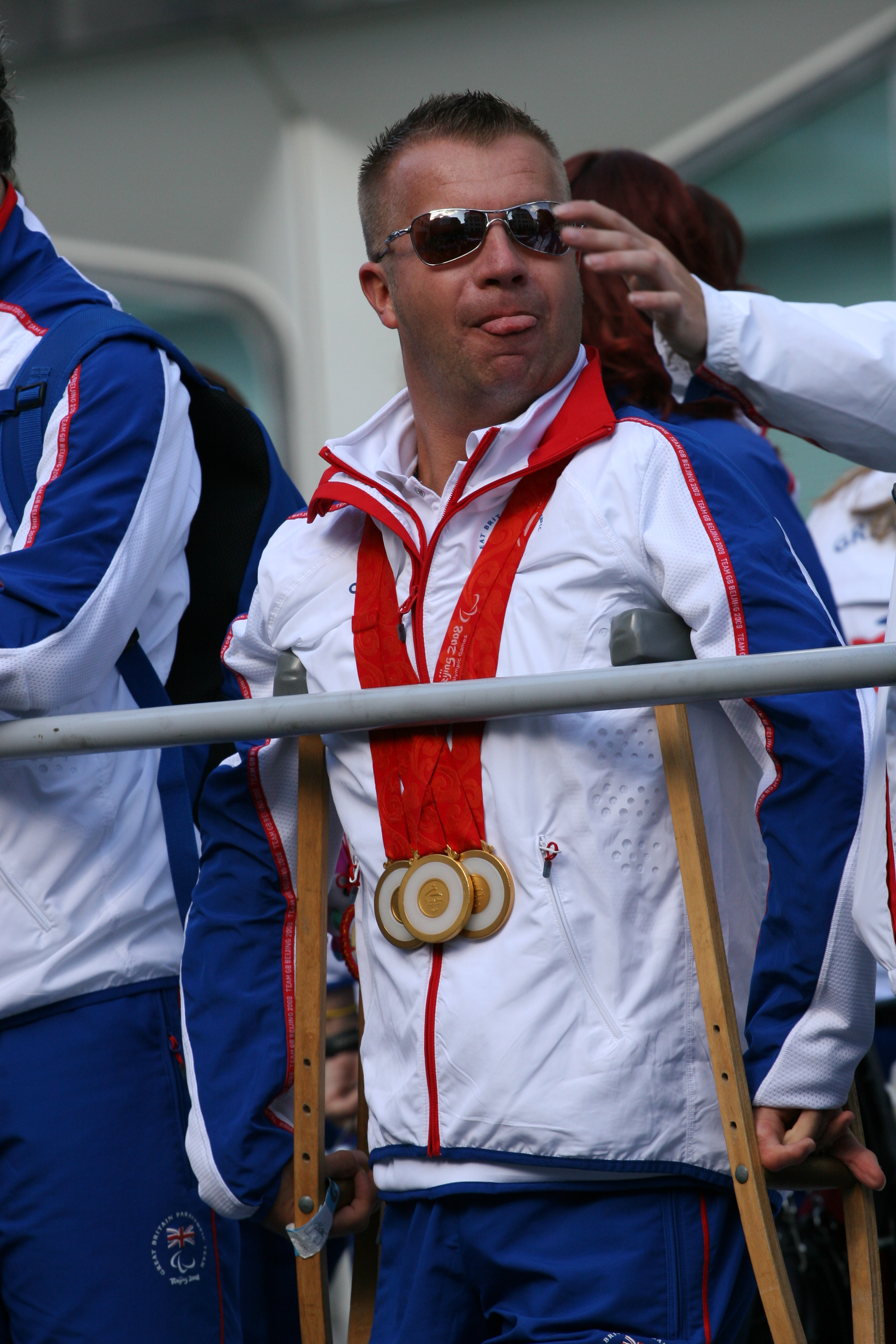
British para-dressage rider Lee Pearson wearing his medals from the 2008 Paralympics

The ranking in this table is based on information provided by the International Paralympic Committee (IPC) and is consistent with IPC convention in its published medal tables. By default, the table is ordered by the number of gold medals the athletes from a nation have won (in this context, a "nation" is an entity represented by a National Paralympic Committee). The number of silver medals is next considered, followed by the number of bronze medals. If nations remain tied, they are ranked equally and listed alphabetically by IPC country code.

In the judo competition, an additional thirteen bronze medals were awards as the losing competitors in both of the semi-finals were each awarded a medal rather than having a playoff bout to decide the medallist. The swimming also saw multiple instances of the same medals being awarded, in the women's 100m backstroke S10, both Sophie Pascoe and Shireen Sapiro swam a dead heat in the final and were both awarded a gold medal, resulting in no silver medal being given that for event. In both the women's 400, freestyle S13 and the men's 100m butterfly S11, two bronze medals were awarded each as two swimmers set the same time in third place.

* Host nation (Host nation (China))

2008 Summer Paralympics medal table
Rank	NPC	Gold	Silver	Bronze	Total
1	China (CHN)*	89	70	52	211
2	Great Britain (GBR)	42	29	31	102
3	United States (USA)	36	35	28	99
4	Ukraine (UKR)	24	18	32	74
5	Australia (AUS)	23	29	27	79
6	South Africa (RSA)	21	3	6	30
7	Canada (CAN)	19	10	21	50
8	Russia (RUS)	18	23	22	63
9	Brazil (BRA)	16	14	17	47
10	Spain (ESP)	15	21	22	58
11	Germany (GER)	14	25	20	59
12	France (FRA)	12	21	19	52
13	South Korea (KOR)	10	8	13	31
14	Mexico (MEX)	10	3	7	20
15	Tunisia (TUN)	9	9	3	21
16	Czech Republic (CZE)	6	3	18	27
17	Japan (JPN)	5	14	8	27
18	Poland (POL)	5	12	13	30
19	Netherlands (NED)	5	10	7	22
20	Greece (GRE)	5	9	10	24
21	Belarus (BLR)	5	7	1	13
22	Iran (IRI)	5	6	3	14
23	Cuba (CUB)	5	3	6	14
24	New Zealand (NZL)	5	3	4	12
24	Sweden (SWE)	5	3	4	12
26	Hong Kong (HKG)	5	3	3	11
27	Kenya (KEN)	5	3	1	9
28	Italy (ITA)	4	7	7	18
29	Egypt (EGY)	4	4	4	12
30	Nigeria (NGR)	4	4	1	9
31	Algeria (ALG)	4	3	8	15
32	Morocco (MAR)	4	1	2	7
33	Austria (AUT)	4	1	1	6
34	Switzerland (SUI)	3	2	6	11
35	Denmark (DEN)	3	2	4	9
36	Ireland (IRL)	3	1	1	5
37	Croatia (CRO)	3	1	0	4
38	Azerbaijan (AZE)	2	3	5	10
39	Slovakia (SVK)	2	3	1	6
40	Finland (FIN)	2	2	2	6
41	Thailand (THA)	1	5	7	13
42	Portugal (POR)	1	4	2	7
43	Norway (NOR)	1	3	3	7
44	Cyprus (CYP)	1	2	1	4
45	Latvia (LAT)	1	2	0	3
46	Singapore (SIN)	1	1	2	4
46	Venezuela (VEN)	1	1	2	4
48	Saudi Arabia (KSA)	1	1	0	2
49	Hungary (HUN)	1	0	5	6
50	Chinese Taipei (TPE)	1	0	1	2
50	Turkey (TUR)	1	0	1	2
52	Mongolia (MGL)	1	0	0	1
53	Israel (ISR)	0	5	1	6
54	Angola (ANG)	0	3	0	3
55	Jordan (JOR)	0	2	2	4
56	Lithuania (LTU)	0	2	0	2
56	Serbia (SRB)	0	2	0	2
58	Argentina (ARG)	0	1	5	6
59	Slovenia (SLO)	0	1	2	3
60	Bulgaria (BUL)	0	1	1	2
60	Colombia (COL)	0	1	1	2
60	Iraq (IRQ)	0	1	1	2
63	Bosnia and Herzegovina (BIH)	0	1	0	1
63	Pakistan (PAK)	0	1	0	1
63	Papua New Guinea (PNG)	0	1	0	1
63	Romania (ROU)	0	1	0	1
63	United Arab Emirates (UAE)	0	1	0	1
68	Lebanon (LIB)	0	0	2	2
69	Belgium (BEL)	0	0	1	1
69	Estonia (EST)	0	0	1	1
69	Jamaica (JAM)	0	0	1	1
69	Laos (LAO)	0	0	1	1
69	Malaysia (MAS)	0	0	1	1
69	Namibia (NAM)	0	0	1	1
69	Puerto Rico (PUR)	0	0	1	1
69	Syria (SYR)	0	0	1	1
Totals (76 entries)		473	471	487	1,431

== Changes in medal standings ==
List of changes in medal standings
Ruling date	Sport	Event	NPC	Gold	Silver	Bronze	Total	Notes
14 September 2008	Athletics	Women's discus throw F37–38	Great Britain		−1		−1	On 14 September 2008, Rebecca Chin was stripped of the silver medal she had won in the F37-38 discus competition. The IPC overruled a change in her classification made earlier in the month, making her ineligible to have won the medal as she was reclassified as a F44 competitor.
14 September 2008	Athletics	Women's discus throw F37–38	Australia		+1	−1		On 14 September 2008, Rebecca Chin was stripped of the silver medal she had won in the F37-38 discus competition. The IPC overruled a change in her classification made earlier in the month, making her ineligible to have won the medal as she was reclassified as a F44 competitor.
14 September 2008	Athletics	Women's discus throw F37–38	China			+1	+1	On 14 September 2008, Rebecca Chin was stripped of the silver medal she had won in the F37-38 discus competition. The IPC overruled a change in her classification made earlier in the month, making her ineligible to have won the medal as she was reclassified as a F44 competitor.

== See also ==
- 2008 Summer Olympics medal table
