= Swimming at the 2008 Summer Paralympics – Women's 50 metre freestyle S7 =

Women's 50m Freestyle S7 at the XIII Paralympic Games
- Venue: Beijing National Aquatics Center
- Dates: 14 September
- Competitors: 9 from 7 nations
- Winning time: 33.84

Medalists
1st place, gold medalist(s)		Cortney Jordan	United States
2nd place, silver medalist(s)		Erin Popovich	United States
3rd place, bronze medalist(s)		Kirsten Bruhn	Germany

The women's 50m freestyle S7 event at the 2008 Summer Paralympics took place at the Beijing National Aquatics Center on 14 September. There were two heats; the swimmers with the eight fastest times advanced to the final.

== Results ==
=== Heats ===
Competed from 10:23.

==== Heat 1 ====
Rank	Name	Nationality	Time	Notes
1	Erin Popovich	United States	34.22	Q, PR
2	Chantal Boonacker	Netherlands	34.98	Q
3	Huang Min	China	35.68	Q
4	Kim Ji Eun	South Korea	37.31	Q

==== Heat 2 ====
Rank	Name	Nationality	Time	Notes
1	Kirsten Bruhn	Germany	34.77	Q
2	Cortney Jordan	United States	35.57	Q
3	Laura Jensen	Canada	36.70	Q
4	Brianna Nelson	Canada	37.76	Q
5	Margita Prokeinova	Slovakia	39.23	

=== Final ===
Competed at 19:12.

Rank	Name	Nationality	Time	Notes
1st place, gold medalist(s)	Cortney Jordan	United States	33.84	PR
2nd place, silver medalist(s)	Erin Popovich	United States	33.92	
3rd place, bronze medalist(s)	Kirsten Bruhn	Germany	34.50	
4	Chantal Boonacker	Netherlands	34.54	
5	Huang Min	China	34.85	
6	Laura Jensen	Canada	36.10	
7	Brianna Nelson	Canada	37.96	
	Kim Ji Eun	South Korea		DQ

Q = qualified for final. PR = Paralympic Record. DQ = Disqualified.
