= Switzerland at the 2008 Summer Paralympics =

- IPC code: SUI
- NPC: Swiss Paralympic Committee
- Website: www.swissparalympic.ch

in Beijing
- Competitors: 26 in 6 sports
- Flag bearer: Heinz Frei
- Officials: Ruedi Spitzli
- Medals Ranked 34th: Gold 3 Silver 2 Bronze 6 Total 11

Summer Paralympics appearances (overview)
- 1960; 1964; 1968; 1972; 1976; 1980; 1984; 1988; 1992; 1996; 2000; 2004; 2008; 2012; 2016; 2020; 2024

Switzerland sent a delegation of 26 athletes (17 male, 9 female) to compete at the 2008 Summer Paralympics in Beijing. The stated goal was to win a minimum of 11 medals and finish the games among the top 50 nations. Swiss athletes competed in 6 sports at the Beijing games and performed as follows:

== Medallists ==
Medal	Name	Sport	Event	Date
Gold	Edith Hunkeler	Athletics	Women's Marathon - T54	17th
Gold	Heinz Frei	Cycling	Men's Individual Road Race - HC B	14th
Gold	Heinz Frei	Cycling	Men's Individual Road Time Trial - HC B	12th
Silver	Beat Bösch	Athletics	Men's 100 m - T52	13th
Silver	Beat Bösch	Athletics	Men's 200 m - T52	10th
Bronze	Philippe Horner	Archery	Men's individual compound – open	13th
Bronze	Urs Kolly	Athletics	Men's Pentathlon - P44	11th
Bronze	Sandra Graf	Athletics	Women's Marathon - T54	17th
Bronze	Edith Hunkeler	Athletics	Women's 1500 m - T54	16th
Bronze	Manuela Schar	Athletics	Women's 200 m - T54	14th
Bronze	Pia Schmid	Athletics	Women's 200 m - T52	11th

== Archery ==
3 competitors:

Men

Athlete	Class	Event	Ranking Round		1/16 Finals	1/8 Finals	Quarterfinals	Semifinals	Final/ Bronze medal contest
Athlete	Class	Event	Score	Seed	Opposition Score	Opposition Score	Opposition Score	Opposition Score	Opposition Score
Philippe Horner	Open	Individual compound	679	5	Bye	Champey (FRA); W 113-109	Heary (IRL); W 113-99	Stubbs (GBR); L 109-114	Pemberton (USA); W 115-111
Robert Lehner	W1	Individual compound	603	9	N/A	Antonios (FIN); W 94-89	Drahoninsky (CZE); L 102-106	Did not advance	

Women

Athlete	Class	Event	Ranking Round		1/16 Finals	1/8 Finals	Quarterfinals	Semifinals	Final/ Bronze medal contest
Athlete	Class	Event	Score	Seed	Opposition Score	Opposition Score	Opposition Score	Opposition Score	Opposition Score
Magali Comte	St	Individual recurve	571	4	Bye	Carmichael (USA); L 76-87	Did not advance		

== Athletics ==
14 competitors:

Men

Athlete	Class	Event	Heats		Semifinal		Final		
Athlete	Class	Event	Result	Rank	Result	Rank	Result	Points	Rank
Maurice Amacher	T54	400 m	52.53	7	Did not advance				
Maurice Amacher	T54	1500 m	3:14.50	5	Did not advance				
Maurice Amacher	T54	5000 m	10:51.41	8	Did not advance				
Christoph Bausch	T44	100 m	12.03	3 Q	N/A		12.03	-	6
Christoph Bausch	T44	200 m	24.89	4 q	N/A		24.61	-	8
Manuel Beeler	T13	400 m	55.42	6	Did not advance				
Manuel Beeler	T13	800 m	N/A				2:03.08	-	8
Beat Bösch	T52	100 m	N/A				17.51	-	Silver medal
Beat Bösch	T52	200 m	N/A				31.41	-	Silver medal
Beat Bösch	T52	400 m	1:05.60	5	Did not advance				
Heinz Frei	T53	800 m	1:38.96	4 q	N/A		1:37.68	-	6
Heinz Frei	T54 (T53)	5000 m	10:23.24	4	Did not advance				
Heinz Frei	T54 (T53)	Marathon	N/A				1:25:43	-	14
Lukas Hendry	T11	100 m	12.39	4	Did not advance				
Lukas Hendry	T11	200 m	25.38	4	Did not advance				
Lukas Hendry	F11	Long jump	N/A				5.54	-	7
Marcel Hug	T54	400 m	47.78	2 Q	49.40	4 q	47.67	-	5
Marcel Hug	T54	800 m	1:40.16	2 Q	1:35.24	5 q	1:37.51	-	5
Marcel Hug	T54	1500 m	3:17.27	1 Q	3:10.33	1 Q	Did not finish		
Marcel Hug	T54	5000 m	10:51.19	1 Q	N/A		10:23.20	-	4
Marcel Hug	T54	Marathon	N/A				Did not finish		
Urs Kolly	F42-44 (F44)	Long jump	N/A				6.36	983	5
Urs Kolly	F42-44 (F44)	Javelin throw	N/A				39.68	728	14
Tobias Lotscher	T54	800 m	1:41.00	6	Did not advance				
Tobias Lotscher	T54	1500 m	3:09.24	4 Q	3:13.98	8	Did not advance		
Tobias Lotscher	T54	Marathon	N/A				1:32:36	-	27
Christoph Sommer	T46	1500 m	4:12.45	9	Did not advance				
Christoph Sommer	T46	5000 m	N/A				15:28.19	-	7

12-time Paralympic gold medallist Heinz Frei also competed in cycling.
Sprinter Simon Vögeli was excluded after a pre-games classification concluded that his disability did not fit Paralympic criteria. A protest by the Swiss delegation was rejected. As a consequence of that decision, Switzerland also had to withdraw their respective 4 × 100 m relay team for lack of participants.

Pentathlon

Athlete	Class	Event	Long jump			Shot put			100 m			Discus throw			400 m			Total	Rank
Athlete	Class	Event	Result	Points	Rank	Result	Points	Rank	Time	Points	Rank	Result	Points	Rank	Time	Points	Rank	Total	Rank
Urs Kolly	P44	Pentathlon	6.30	927	3	12.25	778	3	12.60	862	4	40.15	728	3	1:00.29	823	2	4118	Bronze medal

Women

Athlete	Class	Event	Heats		Semifinal		Final		
Athlete	Class	Event	Result	Rank	Result	Rank	Result	Points	Rank
Sandra Graf	T54	800 m	1:58.67	5	Did not advance				
Sandra Graf	T54	1500 m	3:30.69	4 q	N/A		3:42.26	-	6
Sandra Graf	T54	5000 m	N/A				12:30.55	-	5
Sandra Graf	T54	Marathon	N/A				1:40:01	-	Bronze medal
Edith Hunkeler	T54	400 m	55.33	4 q	N/A		55.25	-	4
Edith Hunkeler	T54	800 m	1:53.08	2 Q	N/A		1:49.11	-	4
Edith Hunkeler	T54	1500 m	3:34.68	3 Q	N/A		3:41.03	-	Bronze medal
Edith Hunkeler	T54	Marathon	N/A				1:39:59	-	Gold medal
Pia Schmid	T52	100 m	N/A				21.53	-	4
Pia Schmid	T52	200 m	N/A				39.95	-	Bronze medal
Manuela Schar	T54	100 m	16.62	3 Q	N/A		16.35	-	4
Manuela Schar	T54	200 m	29.24	1 Q	N/A		28.84	-	Bronze medal
Manuela Schar	T54	400 m	56.31	3 Q	N/A		56.24	-	6

== Cycling ==
5 competitors:

Men

Time trials & Road races

Athlete	Class	Event	Time	Class Factor	Factorized Time	Rank
Heinz Frei	HC B	Road Time Trial	22:06.23	-	-	Gold medal
Heinz Frei	HC B	Road Race	1:28:25	-	-	Gold medal
Franz Nietlispach	HC C	Road Time Trial	21:53.12 (+ 1:36.60)	-	-	6
Franz Nietlispach	HC C	Road Race	1:33:49 (+ 12:09)	-	-	8
Ivan Renggli	LC1	Track Time Trial	1:13.725	-	-	10
Ivan Renggli	LC1	Road Time Trial	35:25.66 (+ 0:44.04)	-	-	4
Ivan Renggli	LC1-2/CP4 (LC1)	Road Race	1:46:13 (+ 0:10)	-	-	11
Lukas Weber	HC B	Road Time Trial	22:50.12 (+ 0:43.89)	-	-	6
Lukas Weber	HC B	Road Race	1:30:24 (+ 1:59)	-	-	7

Pursuits

Athlete(s)	Class	Event	Qualifying		Final/ Bronze medal race	
Athlete(s)	Class	Event	Time Speed (km/h)	Rank	Opposition Time Speed (km/h)	Rank
Ivan Renggli	LC1	Track pursuit	5:06.912; 46.918	9	Did not advance	

Women

Time trials & Road races

Athlete	Class	Event	Time	Class Factor	Factorized Time	Rank
Ursula Schwaller	HC A-C (HC B)	Road time trial	29:29.66	0.81671	24:05.29	4
Ursula Schwaller	HC A-C (HC B)	Road race	1:34:49 (+ 21:49)	-	-	9

== Shooting ==
1 competitor:

Men

Athlete	Class	Event	Qualification		Final		Rank
Athlete	Class	Event	Score	Rank	Score	Total	Rank
Patrick Plattner	SH1	P1-10 m air pistol	552	23	Did not advance		23
Patrick Plattner	SH1	Mixed P3-25 m sport pistol	555	11	Did not advance		11

== Swimming ==
1 competitor:

Women

Athlete	Class	Event	Heats		Final	
Athlete	Class	Event	Result	Rank	Result	Rank
Chantal Cavin	S11	50 m freestyle	33.29	5 Q	32.58	4
Chantal Cavin	S11	100 m freestyle	1:12.09	3 Q	1:12.16	4

== Wheelchair Tennis ==
3 competitors:

Men

Athlete	Class	Event	Round of 64	Round of 32	Round of 16	Quarterfinals	Semifinals	Final
Athlete	Class	Event	Opposition Score	Opposition Score	Opposition Score	Opposition Score	Opposition Score	Opposition Score
Daniel dalla Peregrina	Open	Singles	Illobre (ESP); W 1–6, 6–2, 6-2	Fujimoto (JPN); L 4–6, 6–3, 4-6	Did not advance			
Konstantin Schmäh	Open	Singles	Dobbie (AUS); L 3–6, 4-6	Did not advance				
Daniel dalla Peregrina; Konstantin Schmäh	Open	Doubles	N/A	Oh - Lee (KOR); L 0–6, 1-6	Did not advance			

Women

Athlete	Class	Event	Round of 64	Round of 32	Round of 16	Quarterfinals	Semifinals	Final
Athlete	Class	Event	Opposition Score	Opposition Score	Opposition Score	Opposition Score	Opposition Score	Opposition Score
Karin Suter-Erath	Open	Singles	N/A	Hong (KOR); L 1–6, 1-6	Did not advance			

== See also ==
- 2008 Summer Paralympics
- Switzerland at the Paralympics
- Switzerland at the 2008 Summer Olympics
