= Zhang Cuiping =

Chinese Paralympic shooter

Medal record

Women's shooting para sport

Representing China

Paralympic Games
Gold medal – first place	2012 London	10 m air rifle standing SH1
Gold medal – first place	2012 London	50 m rifle 3 positions SH1
Gold medal – first place	2020 Tokyo	50m air rifle SH1
Silver medal – second place	2008 Beijing	Mixed 10 m air rifle prone SH1
Silver medal – second place	2008 Beijing	Mixed 50 m rifle prone SH1
Silver medal – second place	2016 Rio	10 m air rifle standing SH1
Silver medal – second place	2020 Tokyo	10m air rifle SH1
Bronze medal – third place	2008 Beijing	50 m rifle 3 positions SH1
Bronze medal – third place	2012 London	Mixed 10 m air rifle prone SH1
Bronze medal – third place	2024 Paris	50 m rifle 3 positions SH1

Asian Para Games
Gold medal – first place	2018 Jakarta	50 m rifle 3 positions
Gold medal – first place	2022 Hangzhou	50 m rifle 3 positions
Bronze medal – third place	2018 Jakarta	10 m air rifle
Bronze medal – third place	2022 Hangzhou	10 m air rifle

Zhang Cuiping (Chinese: 张翠平; pinyin: Zhāng Cuìpíng; born 23 September 1987) is a Chinese sport shooter.

== Career ==
At the 2008 Summer Paralympics, she won a silver medal in the Mixed 10 metre air rifle prone SH1 event, a bronze medal in the Women's 50 metre rifle 3 positions SH1 event and a silver medal in the Mixed 50 metre rifle prone SH1 event.

She won a gold medal in the Women's 10 metre air rifle standing SH1 event at the 2012 Summer Paralympics.
