= Lee Yun-ri =

South Korean paralympic sport shooter

Sport
- Country: South Korea
- Sport: Paralympic shooting
Medal record
Women's shooting para sport
Representing South Korea
Paralympic Games
Gold medal – first place	2008 Beijing	50 m rifle 3×20 SH1
Silver medal – second place	2024 Paris	10 m air rifle standing SH1
Bronze medal – third place	2016 Rio de Janeiro	50 m rifle 3 positions

Lee Yun-ri, also known as Yunri Lee, is a South Korean paralympic sport shooter. She competed at the 2024 Summer Paralympics, winning the silver medal in the women's 10 metre air rifle standing SH1 event.
