= Austria at the 2008 Summer Paralympics =

- IPC code: AUT
- NPC: Austrian Paralympic Committee
- Website: www.oepc.at (in German)

in Beijing
- Competitors: 38 in 8 sports
- Flag bearer: Christoph Etzlstorfer
- Officials: Petra Huber
- Medals Ranked 33rd: Gold 4 Silver 1 Bronze 1 Total 6

Summer Paralympics appearances (overview)
- 1960; 1964; 1968; 1972; 1976; 1980; 1984; 1988; 1992; 1996; 2000; 2004; 2008; 2012; 2016; 2020; 2024

Austria sent a delegation to the 2008 Summer Paralympics in Beijing, and unsuccessfully tried to improve on the 23 medals (8 of them gold) won in 2004. 38 Austrian athletes competed in 8 sports as follows:

== Medallists ==
Medal	Name	Sport	Event	Date
Gold	Thomas Geierspichler	Athletics	Men's Marathon - T52	17
Gold	Andrea Scherney	Athletics	Women's Long Jump - F44	9
Gold	Wolfgang Schattauer	Cycling	Men's Individual Road Time Trial - HC A	12
Gold	Andreas Vevera	Table tennis	Men's Singles - TT1	11
Silver	Wolfgang Eibeck	Cycling	Men's Individual Road Time Trial - LC1	12
Bronze	Thomas Geierspichler	Athletics	Men's 800 m - T52	16

== Athletics ==
Men

Athlete	Class	Event	Heats		Semifinal		Final		
Athlete	Class	Event	Result	Rank	Result	Rank	Result	Points	Rank
Michael Linhart	T44	100 m	12.11	5	did not advance				
Michael Linhart	T44	400 m	N/A				55.76	-	6
Günther Matzinger	T46	200 m	23.27	3 q	N/A		23.12	-	7
Günther Matzinger	T46	400 m	49.43	1 Q	N/A		49.56	-	5
Thomas Geierspichler	T52	200 m	N/A				32.31	-	5
Thomas Geierspichler	T52	400 m	1:00.86	2 Q	N/A		1:01.03	-	4
Thomas Geierspichler	T52	800 m	1:59.39	3 Q	N/A		1:56.26	-	Bronze medal
Thomas Geierspichler	T52	Marathon	N/A				1:40:07 WR	-	Gold medal
Bil Marinkovic	F11-12 (F11)	Discus throw	N/A				37.24	910	6
Bil Marinkovic	F11-12 (F11)	Javelin throw	N/A				46.44	949	4
Andreas Gratt	F53-54 (F54)	Shot put	N/A				9.62	990	5
Andreas Gratt	F53-54 (F54)	Javelin throw	N/A				18.48	701	10
Georg Tischler	F53-54 (F54)	Shot put	N/A				9.61	989	6
Georg Tischler	F53-54 (F54)	Discus throw	N/A				21.70	789	9

Women

Athlete	Class	Event	Heats		Semifinal		Final		
Athlete	Class	Event	Result	Rank	Result	Rank	Result	Points	Rank
Andrea Scherney	T44	100 m	14.49	3 Q	N/A		14.48	-	8
Andrea Scherney	F44	Long jump	N/A				4.82	-	Gold medal
Andrea Scherney	F42-46 (F44)	Discus throw	N/A				32.29	855	6

== Cycling ==
Men

Time trials & Road races

Athlete	Class	Event	Time	Class Factor	Factorized Time	Rank
Christoph Etzlstorfer	HC A	Road Time Trial	40:40.36 (+ 10:42.59)	-	-	6
Wolfgang Schattauer	HC A	Road Time Trial	29:57.77	-	-	Gold medal
Manfred Putz	HC B	Road Time Trial	22:44.88 (+ 0:38.65)	-	-	5
Manfred Putz	HC B	Road Race	1:28:31 (+ 0:06)	-	-	4
Elmar Sternath	HC C	Road Time Trial	24:33.70 (+ 4:17.18)	-	-	9
Elmar Sternath	HC C	Road Race	1:27:35 (+ 5:55)	-	-	5
Helmut Winterleitner	CP1-2 (CP2)	Mixed road time trial	28:34.12	1.00000	28:34.12	11
Helmut Winterleitner	CP1-2 (CP2)	Mixed road race	49:47 (+ 4:42)	-	-	5
Wolfgang Eibeck	LC1	Track time trial	1:11.238	-	-	5
Wolfgang Eibeck	LC1	Road time trial	34:52.20 (+ 0:10.58)	-	-	Silver medal
Wolfgang Eibeck	LC1-2/CP4 (LC1)	Road race	1:46:13 (+ 0:10)	-	-	7
Manfred Gattringer	LC1	Track time trial	1:12.173	-	-	8
Manfred Gattringer	LC1	Road time trial	36:26.50 (+ 1:44.88)	-	-	8
Manfred Gattringer	LC1-2/CP4 (LC1)	Road race	did not start			
Erich Stauffer	LC3-4 (LC3)	Track time trial	1:27.934	1.00000	1:27.934	18
Erich Stauffer	LC3	Road time trial	41:00.76 (+ 3:00.45)	-	-	10
Erich Stauffer	LC3-4/CP3 (LC3)	Road race	1:39.15 (+ 2:15)	-	-	13
Wolfgang Dabernik	LC3-4 (LC4)	Track time trial	1:31.787	0.95718	1:27.856	17
Wolfgang Dabernik	LC4	Road time trial	47:57.44 (+ 9:10.65)	-	-	7
Wolfgang Dabernik	LC3-4/CP3 (LC4)	Road race	did not finish			
Alexander Hohlrieder	LC3-4 (LC4)	Track time trial	1:27.690	0.95718	1:23.935	14
Alexander Hohlrieder	LC4	Road time trial	41:20.07 (+ 2:33.28)	-	-	4
Alexander Hohlrieder	LC3-4/CP3 (LC4)	Road race	1:39.15 (+ 2:15)	-	-	15

Pursuits & Sprints

Athlete(s)	Class	Event	Qualifying		Final/ Bronze medal race	
Athlete(s)	Class	Event	Time Speed (km/h)	Rank	Opposition Time Speed (km/h)	Rank
Wolfgang Eibeck	LC1	Track pursuit	4:58.890; 48.178	8	did not advance	
Manfred Gattringer	LC1	Track pursuit	4:54.721; 48.859	6	did not advance	
Erich Stauffer	LC3	Track pursuit	4:06.174; 43.871	7	did not advance	
Wolfgang Dabernik	LC4	Track pursuit	4:40.614; 38.487	7	did not advance	
Alexander Hohlrieder	LC4	Track pursuit	did not start			

Women

Time trials & Road races

Athlete	Class	Event	Time	Class Factor	Factorized Time	Rank
Anita Ruetz	LC1-2/CP4 (CP4)	Track time trial	49.884	0.85236	42.519	10
Anita Ruetz	LC1-2/CP4 (CP4)	Road time trial	50:25.44	0.94950	47:52.65	9

Pursuits & Sprints

Athlete	Class	Event	Qualifying				Final/ Bronze medal race			
Athlete	Class	Event	Time	Class Factor	Factorized Time	Rank	Time	Class Factor	Factorized Time	Rank
Anita Ruetz	LC1-2/CP4 (CP4)	Track pursuit	4:56.779	0.89335	4:25.127	10	did not advance			

== Equestrian ==
Athlete	Horse	Class	Event	Result	Rank
Thomas Haller	Haller's Diorella	Grade II	Championship Test	59.727	14
Thomas Haller	Haller's Diorella	Grade II	Freestyle Test	63.665	11

== Sailing ==
Men

Athletes	Class	Event	Race											Score	Rank
Athletes	Class	Event	1	2	3	4	5	6	7	8	9	10	Medal	Score	Rank
Edmund Rath; Sven Reiger; Helmut Seewald	3 Points; 6 Points; 4 Points	Sonar	~~13~~	8	11	11	~~13~~	12	11	7	12	12	4	88	13

== Shooting ==
Athlete	Class	Event	Qualification		Final		Rank
Athlete	Class	Event	Score	Rank	Score	Total	Rank
Hubert Aufschnaiter	SH1	P1-10m air pistol	562	10	did not advance		10
Hubert Aufschnaiter	SH1	Mixed P3-25m sport pistol	561	8 Q	200.8	761.8	8
Hubert Aufschnaiter	SH1	Mixed P4-50m free pistol	522	11	did not advance		11
Werner Müller	SH1	R1-10m air rifle standing	580	14	did not advance		14
Werner Müller	SH1	Mixed R6-50m free rifle prone	571	35	did not advance		35
Werner Müller	SH1	R7-50m free rifle 3x40	1113	19	did not advance		19

Women

Athlete	Class	Event	Qualification		Final		Rank
Athlete	Class	Event	Score	Rank	Score	Total	Rank
Barbara Doppler	SH1	P2-10m air pistol	354	14	did not advance		14

== Swimming ==
Men

Athlete	Class	Event	Heats		Final	
Athlete	Class	Event	Result	Rank	Result	Rank
Andreas Daniel Onea	SB8	100 m breaststroke	1:17.76	6 Q	1:17.71	6
Thomas Seidling	SB11	100 m breaststroke	1:30.65	13	did not advance	

== Table tennis ==
Men
Individual

Athlete	Class	Event	Round 1	Round 2	Round 3	1/8 Finals	Quarterfinals	Semifinals	Final/ Bronze medal contest
Athlete	Class	Event	Opposition Result	Opposition Result	Opposition Result	Opposition Result	Opposition Result	Opposition Result	Opposition Result
Andreas Vevera	TT1	Singles	Cho (KOR); L 2-3	Kilger (GER); W 3-0	Fernandez (CUB); W 3-0	N/A		Lee (KOR); W 3-1	Cho (KOR); W 3-0
Hans Ruep	TT2	Singles	Vella (ITA); W 3-1	Espindola (BRA); W 3-1	Boury (FRA); L 0-3	did not advance			
Manfred Dollmann	TT3	Singles	Knaf (BRA); W 3-1	Feng (CHN); L 1-3	did not advance				
Egon Kramminger	TT3	Singles	Egbinola (NGR); W 3-1	Geva (ISR); L 1-3	did not advance				
Günther Unger	TT3	Singles	Rawson (GBR); W 3-0	Silva (BRA); L 0-3	did not advance				
Peter Starl	TT4-5	Singles	Durasinovic (SRB); W 3-2	Urhaug (NOR); L 0-3	did not advance				
Stanislaw Fraczyk	TT9-10	Singles	Cieslar (CZE); W 3-0	Powrozniak (POL); W 3-2	N/A	Andersson (SWE); L 0-3	did not advance		
Andreas Vevera; Hans Ruep	TT1-2	Team	N/A				Brazil; W 3-1	France; L 1-3	South Korea; L 0-3
Manfred Dollmann; Egon Kramminger; Günther Unger	TT3	Team	N/A				Brazil; L 0-3	did not advance	

Women

Athlete	Class	Event	Round 1	Round 2	Round 3	1/8 Finals	Quarterfinals	Semifinals	Final
Athlete	Class	Event	Opposition Result	Opposition Result	Opposition Result	Opposition Result	Opposition Result	Opposition Result	Opposition Result
Doris Mader	TT3	Singles	Bertrand (FRA); W 3-0	Cudia (ITA); W 3-1	Pintar (SLO); L 2-3	did not advance			

== Wheelchair Tennis ==
Men

Athlete	Class	Event	Round of 64	Round of 32	Round of 16	Quarterfinals	Semifinals	Final
Athlete	Class	Event	Opposition Score	Opposition Score	Opposition Score	Opposition Score	Opposition Score	Opposition Score
Martin Legner	Open	Singles	Ikenoya (JPN); W 6-1, 6-0	Phillipson (GBR); W 6-0, 6-0	Vink (NED); L 4-6, 3-6	did not advance		
Thomas Mossier	Open	Singles	Santos (BRA); L 6-7(2), 5-7	did not advance				
Harald Pfundner	Open	Singles	Rydberg (USA); L 2-6, 0-6	did not advance				
Martin Legner; Thomas Mossier	Open	Doubles	N/A	Weekes - Dobbie (AUS); W 6-4, 6-1	Majdi - Peifer (FRA); W 6-3, 6-4	Saida - Kunieda (JPN); L 2-6, 1-6	did not advance	

== See also ==
- 2008 Summer Paralympics
- Austria at the Paralympics
- Austria at the 2008 Summer Olympics
