= Sweden at the 2008 Summer Paralympics =

- IPC code: SWE
- NPC: Swedish Parasports Federation

in Beijing
- Flag bearer: Anders Olsson
- Medals Ranked 24th: Gold 5 Silver 3 Bronze 4 Total 12

Summer Paralympics appearances (overview)
- 1960; 1964; 1968; 1972; 1976; 1980; 1984; 1988; 1992; 1996; 2000; 2004; 2008; 2012; 2016; 2020; 2024

Sweden sent a delegation to compete at the 2008 Summer Paralympics in Beijing.

== Medalists ==
| Medal | Name | Sport | Event |
|---|---|---|---|
| Gold | Jonas Jacobsson | Shooting | Men's R1 10m Air Rifle Standing SH1 |
| Gold | Jonas Jacobsson | Shooting | Men's R7 50m Free Rifle 3x40 SH1 |
| Gold | Jonas Jacobsson | Shooting | Mixed R6 50m Free Rifle Prone SH1 |
| Gold | Anders Olsson | Swimming | Men's 100m freestyle S6 |
| Gold | Anders Olsson | Swimming | Men's 400m freestyle S6 |
| Silver | Josefin Abrahamsson | Table Tennis | Women's individual – Class 8 |
| Silver | Johan Andersson | Wheelchair Tennis | Quad Singles |
| Silver | Stefan Olsson; Peter Wikström | Wheelchair Tennis | Quad Doubles |
| Bronze | Viktoria Wedin | Shooting | Mixed R5 10m Air Rifle Prone SH2 |
| Bronze | Fredrik Andersson | Table Tennis | Men's Individual – Class 9/10 |
| Bronze | Jimmy Björkstrand; Stefan Gahne; Niklas Hultkvist; Oskar Kuus; Fatmir Seremeti; Mikael Åkerberg | Goalball | Men's tournament |
| Bronze | Anders Olsson | Swimming | Men's 50m freestyle S6 |

== Archery ==
Women

| Athlete | Event | Ranking Round | | Quarterfinals | Semifinals | Final | |
| Athlete | Event | Score | Seed | Opposition Score | Opposition Score | Opposition Score | Rank |
|---|---|---|---|---|---|---|---|
| Anders Grönberg | Men's individual compound open | 657 | 18 | Simonelli (ITA); L 107–112 | Did not advance | | |
| Håkan Törnström | Men's individual compound open | 675 | 10 | Bye | Klich (CZE); L 103–106 | Did not advance | |
| Ann-Christin Nilsson | Women's individual compound open | 641 | 6 | Su (TUR); L 102–112 | Did not advance | | |
| Zandra Reppe | Women's individual compound open | 658 | 2 | Kamiya (JPN); L 106–107 | Did not advance | | |

== Athletics ==
Men's track

| Athlete | Event | Heat | | Final | |
| Athlete | Event | Result | Position | Result | Position |
|---|---|---|---|---|---|
| Aron Andersson | 800m T54 | 1:46.42 | 6 | Did not advance | |
| Aron Andersson | 1500m T54 | 3:21.00 | 7 | Did not advance | |
| Aron Andersson | 5000m T54 | 11:30.79 | 10 | Did not advance | |
| Aron Andersson | Marathon T54 | — | | 1:32:36 | 26 |
| Per Jonsson | 100m T13 | 11.71 | 6 | Did not advance | |
| Per Jonsson | 200m T13 | 23.73 | 8 | Did not advance | |
| Henrik Rüffel (companion: Cedric Schwartzler) | Marathon T12 | — | | 2:57:50 | 22 |

Women's track

| Athlete | Event | Heat | | Final | |
| Athlete | Event | Result | Rank | Result | Rank |
|---|---|---|---|---|---|
| Nathalie Nilsson | 100m T13 | 14.01 | 4 | Did not advance | |
| Nathalie Nilsson | 800m T13 | 2:32.76 | 8 | Did not advance | |
| Madelene Nordlund | 100m T53 | 18.66 | 3 Q | 18.40 | 7 |
| Madelene Nordlund | 200m T53 | 32.66 | 5 q | 32.31 | 8 |
| Madelene Nordlund | 400m T53 | DNS | | Did not advance | |
| Madelene Nordlund | 800m T53 | — | | DNS | |
| Gunilla Wallengren | 100m T54 | 31.23 | 3 | Did not advance | |
| Gunilla Wallengren | 400m T54 | 57.48 | 5 q | 58.20 | 8 |
| Gunilla Wallengren | 800m T54 | 1:56.43 | 4 q | 1:50.09 | 6 |
| Gunilla Wallengren | 1500m T54 | 3:35.40 | 4 | Did not advance | |

Women's field

| Athlete | Event | Final | |
| Athlete | Event | Result | Rank |
|---|---|---|---|
| Nathalie Nilsson | Long jump F13 | 4.43 | 11 |

== Equestrian ==
| Athlete | Classification | Event | Team Test | | Championship Test | | Freestyle Test | |
| Athlete | Classification | Event | Score | Rank | Score | Rank | Score | Rank |
|---|---|---|---|---|---|---|---|---|
| Lotten Aronsson (Busy Lizzy) | Grade IV | Individual | 61.857 | 10 | 64.839 | 6 | 68.362 | 6 |
| Gabriella Löf (Oleander) | Grade III | Individual | 60.231 | 6 | 56.960 | 11 | 65.055 | 9 |
| Carolin Rutberg (Weltini) | Grade II | Individual | 64.667 | 5 | 65.182 | 7 | 61.167 | 13 |

== Goalball ==
=== Women ===
- Åsa Alverstedt
- Malin Gustavsson
- Maria Juliusson
- Josefine Jälmestål
- Sofia Naesström
- Anna Nilsson.

Preliminary

| Team | Pld | W | D | L | GF | GA | GD | Points |
|---|---|---|---|---|---|---|---|---|
| China (CHN) | 7 | 6 | 1 | 0 | 21 | 7 | 14 | 19 |
| United States (USA) | 7 | 4 | 2 | 1 | 18 | 11 | 7 | 14 |
| Denmark (DEN) | 7 | 4 | 2 | 1 | 13 | 9 | 4 | 14 |
| Sweden (SWE) | 7 | 3 | 1 | 3 | 30 | 27 | 3 | 10 |
| Canada (CAN) | 7 | 2 | 3 | 2 | 15 | 13 | 2 | 9 |
| Brazil (BRA) | 7 | 2 | 1 | 4 | 21 | 24 | -3 | 7 |
| Japan (JPN) | 7 | 2 | 0 | 5 | 8 | 16 | -8 | 6 |
| Germany (GER) | 7 | 0 | 0 | 7 | 8 | 27 | -19 | 0 |

| 7 September; 13:00 | Canada (CAN) | 3–3 | Sweden (SWE) | Beijing Institute of Technology Gymnasium; Referees: Nejc Jakic (SLO), Lena Bonke (DEN) |
| 7 September; 13:00 | | (Report) | Jalmestal 2 | Beijing Institute of Technology Gymnasium; Referees: Nejc Jakic (SLO), Lena Bonke (DEN) |

| 8 September; 21:00 | Sweden (SWE) | 4–1 | Japan (JPN) | Beijing Institute of Technology Gymnasium; Referees: Patricia Fras(SLO), Nejc Jakic (SLO) |
| 8 September; 21:00 | Gustavsson 2 | (Report) | | Beijing Institute of Technology Gymnasium; Referees: Patricia Fras(SLO), Nejc Jakic (SLO) |

| 9 September; 18:00 | Sweden (SWE) | 1–2 | Denmark (DEN) | Beijing Institute of Technology Gymnasium; Referees: Kari Rasanen (FIN), Keith Lound (GBR) |
| 9 September; 18:00 | | (Report) | Ryding 2 | Beijing Institute of Technology Gymnasium; Referees: Kari Rasanen (FIN), Keith Lound (GBR) |

| 10 September; 18:00 | Sweden (SWE) | 3–5 | China (CHN) | Beijing Institute of Technology Gymnasium; Referees: Balint Benko (HUN), Lena Bonke (DEN) |
| 10 September; 18:00 | Gustavsson 2 | (Report) | Wang 4 | Beijing Institute of Technology Gymnasium; Referees: Balint Benko (HUN), Lena Bonke (DEN) |

| 11 September; 13:00 | Brazil (BRA) | 4–5 | Sweden (SWE) | Beijing Institute of Technology Gymnasium; Referees: Claude Dagenais (CAN), Patrick Gafney (USA) |
| 11 September; 13:00 | Silva, Custodio 2 | (Report) | Gustavsson 3 | Beijing Institute of Technology Gymnasium; Referees: Claude Dagenais (CAN), Patrick Gafney (USA) |

| 12 September; 19:00 | Germany (GER) | 5–10 | Sweden (SWE) | Beijing Institute of Technology Gymnasium; Referees: Lena Bonke (DEN), Kari Rasanen(FIN) |
| 12 September; 19:00 | Fischer, Schindler 2 | (Report) | Gustavsson, Jalmestal 5 | Beijing Institute of Technology Gymnasium; Referees: Lena Bonke (DEN), Kari Rasanen(FIN) |

| 13 September; 11:00 | United States (USA) | 7–4 | Sweden (SWE) | Beijing Institute of Technology Gymnasium; Referees: Christl Daentler (GER), Lena Bonke (DEN) |
| 13 September; 11:00 | Armbruster 2, Miller 5 | (Report) | Gustavsson 3 | Beijing Institute of Technology Gymnasium; Referees: Christl Daentler (GER), Lena Bonke (DEN) |

Semifinal

| 14 September; 10:00 | China (CHN) | 1–1 (3–2) | Sweden (SWE) | Beijing Institute of Technology Gymnasium; Referees: Patrick Gafney (USA), Rudi Janssen (BEL) |
| 14 September; 10:00 | Wang 2 | (Report) | Gustavsson 3 | Beijing Institute of Technology Gymnasium; Referees: Patrick Gafney (USA), Rudi Janssen (BEL) |

Bronze medal match

| 14 September; 10:00 | Denmark (DEN) | 3–2 | Sweden (SWE) | Beijing Institute of Technology Gymnasium; Referees: Pieter Westerhout (NED), Patricia Fras (SLO) |
| 14 September; 10:00 | Vedsted 2 | (Report) | Gustavsson 2 | Beijing Institute of Technology Gymnasium; Referees: Pieter Westerhout (NED), Patricia Fras (SLO) |

=== Men ===
- Jimmy Björkstrand
- Stefan Gahne
- Niklas Hultkvist
- Oskar Kuus
- Fatmir Seremeti
- Mikael Åkerberg

Preliminary

| Team | P | W | D | L | GF | GA | GD | Points |
|---|---|---|---|---|---|---|---|---|
| China (CHN) | 5 | 4 | 0 | 1 | 57 | 25 | 32 | 12 |
| Sweden (SWE) | 5 | 4 | 0 | 1 | 41 | 30 | 11 | 12 |
| Canada (CAN) | 5 | 2 | 0 | 3 | 27 | 30 | 3 | 6 |
| United States (USA) | 5 | 2 | 0 | 3 | 16 | 37 | -21 | 6 |
| Iran (IRI) | 5 | 2 | 0 | 3 | 29 | 34 | -5 | 6 |
| Brazil (BRA) | 5 | 1 | 0 | 4 | 25 | 39 | -14 | 3 |

| 7 September; 10:00 | Sweden (SWE) | 8–6 | Brazil (BRA) | Beijing Institute of Technology Gymnasium; Attendance: Patricia Fras (SLO), Balint Benko (HUN) |
| 7 September; 10:00 | | (report) | | Beijing Institute of Technology Gymnasium; Attendance: Patricia Fras (SLO), Balint Benko (HUN) |

| 8 September; 10:00 | China (CHN) | 13–8 | Sweden (SWE) | Beijing Institute of Technology Gymnasium; Referees: Pieter Westerhout (NED), Claude Dagenais (CAN) |
| 8 September; 10:00 | | (Report) | | Beijing Institute of Technology Gymnasium; Referees: Pieter Westerhout (NED), Claude Dagenais (CAN) |

| 9 September; 17:00 | Sweden (SWE) | 10–5 | Iran (IRI) | Beijing Institute of Technology Gymnasium; Referees: Lena Bonke (DEN), Dan Parisi(USA) |
| 9 September; 17:00 | Hultqvist 6, Björkstrand 4 | (Report) | Jalilvand 4 | Beijing Institute of Technology Gymnasium; Referees: Lena Bonke (DEN), Dan Parisi(USA) |

| 10 September; 20:00 | Canada (CAN) | 5–6 | Sweden (SWE) | Beijing Institute of Technology Gymnasium; Referees: Keith Lound (GBR), Patrick Gafney (USA) |
| 10 September; 20:00 | Caron 4 | (Report) | Hultqvist 5 | Beijing Institute of Technology Gymnasium; Referees: Keith Lound (GBR), Patrick Gafney (USA) |

| 11 September; 17:00 | Sweden (SWE) | 9–1 | United States (USA) | Beijing Institute of Technology Gymnasium; Referees: Christl Daentler (GER), Allan Wareham (CAN) |
| 11 September; 17:00 | Björkstrand 6, Hultqvist 2 | (Report) | | Beijing Institute of Technology Gymnasium; Referees: Christl Daentler (GER), Allan Wareham (CAN) |

Quarterfinal

| 12 September; 10:00 | Denmark (DEN) | 2–4 | Sweden (SWE) | Beijing Institute of Technology Gymnasium; Referees: Eeva Sorkkila (FIN), Aurora Zanolin (ITA) |
| 12 September; 10:00 | | (Report) | Hultqvist 3 | Beijing Institute of Technology Gymnasium; Referees: Eeva Sorkkila (FIN), Aurora Zanolin (ITA) |

Semifinal

| 13 September; 19:00 | Lithuania (LTU) | 10–3 | Sweden (SWE) | Beijing Institute of Technology Gymnasium; Referees: Clive Spencer (GBR), Pieter Westerhout (NED) |
| 13 September; 19:00 | Leonavicius 7, Montvydas 2 | (Report) | Seremeti 2 | Beijing Institute of Technology Gymnasium; Referees: Clive Spencer (GBR), Pieter Westerhout (NED) |

Bronze medal match

| 14 September; 18:00 | Sweden (SWE) | 5–2 | United States (USA) | Beijing Institute of Technology Gymnasium; Referees: Claude Dagenais (CAN), Eeva Sorkkila (FIN) |
| 14 September; 18:00 | Seremeti 2, Björkstrand 3 | (Report) | | Beijing Institute of Technology Gymnasium; Referees: Claude Dagenais (CAN), Eeva Sorkkila (FIN) |

== Judo ==
| Athlete | Event | Quarterfinals | Semifinals | Repechage Quarterfinals | Repechage Semifinals | Final | Rank |
| Athlete | Event | Opposition Result | Opposition Result | Opposition Result | Opposition Result | Opposition Result | Rank |
|---|---|---|---|---|---|---|---|
| Elvira Kivi | Women's -63 kg | Batsukh (MGL); W 1000–0010 | Soazo (VEN); L 0120–0240 | — | | Quessandier (FRA); L 0000–1010 | 5 |
| Nicolina Pernheim | Women's -70 kg | — | Ruvalcaba (MEX); L 0000–0200 | — | | Vermeulen (NED); L 0001–0113 | 5 |

== Sailing ==
| Athlete | Event | Race | | | | | | | | | | | Score | Rank |
| Athlete | Event | 1 | 2 | 3 | 4 | 5 | 6 | 7 | 8 | 9 | 10 | M | Score | Rank |
|---|---|---|---|---|---|---|---|---|---|---|---|---|---|---|
| Carl-Gustaf Fresk; Birgitta Jacobsson Nilén | SKUD 18 | 6 | (9) | 4 | 4 | 7 | (12) | 3 | 5 | 9 | 7 | | 45 | 7 |

== Shooting ==
Men

| Athlete | Event | Qualification | | Final | | |
| Athlete | Event | Score | Rank | Score | Total | Rank |
|---|---|---|---|---|---|---|
| Jonas Jacobsson | 10m Air Rifle Stand SH1 | 596 WR | 1 Q | 104.5 | 700.5 FWR | 1st place, gold medalist(s) |
| Jonas Jacobsson | 50m Free Rifle 3x40 SH1 | 1163 WR | 1 Q | 101.3 | 1264.3 FWR | 1st place, gold medalist(s) |
| Jonas Jacobsson | 10m Air Rifle Prone SH1 | 598 | 13 | Did not advance | | |
| Jonas Jacobsson | 50m Free Rifle Prone SH1 | 592 | 1 Q | 103.8 | 695.8 | 1st place, gold medalist(s) |
| Håkan Gustavsson | 10m Air Rifle Stand SH1 | 579 | 16 | Did not advance | | |
| Håkan Gustavsson | 50m Free Rifle 3x40 SH1 | 1122 | 16 | Did not advance | | |
| Håkan Gustavsson | 10m Air Rifle Prone SH1 | 578 | 44 | Did not advance | | |
| Håkan Gustavsson | 50m Free Rifle Prone SH1 | 582 | 21 | Did not advance | | |
| Kenneth Pettersson | 10m Air Pistol SH1 | 558 | 16 | Did not advance | | |
| Kenneth Pettersson | 25m Sport Pistol SH1 | 554 | 12 | Did not advance | | |

Women

| Athlete | Event | Qualification | | Final | | |
| Athlete | Event | Score | Rank | Score | Total | Rank |
|---|---|---|---|---|---|---|
| Lotta Helsinger | 10m Air Rifle Stand SH1 | 386 | 8 Q | 101.2 | 487.2 | 6 |
| Lotta Helsinger | 50m Sport Rifle 3x20 SH1 | 568 | 6 Q | 91.9 | 659.9 | 7 |
| Lotta Helsinger | 10m Air Rifle Prone SH1 | 596 | 21 | Did not advance | | |
| Lotta Helsinger | 50m Free Rifle Prone SH1 | 581 | 23 | Did not advance | | |
| Viktoria Wedin | 10m Air Rifle Prone SH2 | 600 | 1 Q | 104.1 | 704.1 | 3rd place, bronze medalist(s) |
| Viktoria Wedin | 10m Air Rifle Stand SH2 | 596 | 10 | Did not advance | | |

== Swimming ==
Men

| Athlete | Event | Heat | | Final | |
| Athlete | Event | Time | Rank | Time | Rank |
|---|---|---|---|---|---|
| Christoffer Lindhe | 50m freestyle S4 | 43.09 | 6 Q | 42.75 | 6 |
| Christoffer Lindhe | 100m freestyle S4 | 1:32.98 | 3 Q | 1:30.92 | 4 |
| Christoffer Lindhe | 200m freestyle S4 | 3:11.81 | 3 Q | 3:11.84 | 4 |
| Anders Olsson | 50m freestyle S6 | 31.48 | 4 Q | 31.07 | 3rd place, bronze medalist(s) |
| Anders Olsson | 100m freestyle S6 | 1:07.68 | 1 Q | 1:05.95 WR | 1st place, gold medalist(s) |
| Anders Olsson | 400m freestyle S6 | 5:00.41 WR | 1 Q | 4:48.31 WR | 1st place, gold medalist(s) |
| Anders Olsson | 200m individual medley SM6 | 3:03.35 | 3 Q | 2:57.30 | 6 |

Women

| Athlete | Event | Heat | | Final | |
| Athlete | Event | Time | Rank | Time | Rank |
|---|---|---|---|---|---|
| Jennie Ekström | 50m freestyle S4 | — | | 53.74 | 4 |
| Jennie Ekström | 100m freestyle S4 | 2:00.22 | 2 Q | 2:00.68 | 6 |
| Jennie Ekström | 150m individual medley SM4 | — | | 3:55.59 | 5 |
| Lalita Loureiro | 50m butterfly S7 | 39.47 | 3 Q | 38.55 | 4 |
| Lalita Loureiro | 100m breaststroke SB6 | 1:59.00 | 5 | Did not advance | |
| Lalita Loureiro | 200m individual medley SM7 | 3:33.05 | 5 | Did not advance | |

== Table tennis ==
Men

| Athlete | Event | Group | | | Round of 16 | Quarterfinals | Semifinals | Final | Rank |
| Athlete | Event | Opposition Result | Opposition Result | Opposition Result | Opposition Result | Opposition Result | Opposition Result | Opposition Result | Rank |
|---|---|---|---|---|---|---|---|---|---|
| Fredrik Andersson | Singles – C9/10 | Baroncelli (ITA); W 3–0 | Cardona (ESP); W 3–0 | — | Fraczyk (AUT); W 3–0 | Ruiz Reyes (ESP); W 3–2 | Ma (CHN); L 0–3 | Last (NED); W 3–1 | 3rd place, bronze medalist(s) |
| Ernst Bolldén | Singles – Class 4/5 | Ank (BRA); W 3–0 | Lin (TPE); W 3–0 | — | Saleh (EGY); L 2–3 | Did not advance | | | |
| Simon Itkonen | Singles – Class 6 | Thainiyom (THA); L 0–3 | Blok (NED); L 2–3 | Jensen (DEN); L 1–3 | Did not advance | | | | |
| Linus Karlsson | Singles – Class 9/10 | Gáspár (SVK); W 3–1 | Last (NED); L 0–3 | Did not advance | | | | | |
| Örjan Kylevik | Singles – Class 3 | Chan (GBR); W 3–0 | Piñas (ESP); L 1–3 | Did not advance | | | | | |
| Örjan Kylevik; Ernst Bolldén | Team – Class 4-5 | — | | | Slovakia; W 3–0 | South Korea; L 2–3 | Did not advance | | |
| Linus Karlsson; Fredrik Andersson | Team – Class 9-10 | — | | | Italy; W 3–0 | China; L 2–3 | Did not advance | | |

Women

| Athlete | Event | Group | | | Round of 16 | Quarterfinals | Semifinals | Final | Rank |
| Athlete | Event | Opposition Result | Opposition Result | Opposition Result | Opposition Result | Opposition Result | Opposition Result | Opposition Result | Rank |
|---|---|---|---|---|---|---|---|---|---|
| Josefin Abrahamsson | Singles – Class 8 | Janeckova (CZE); W 3–1 | Kamkasomphou (FRA); L 0–3 | Barbušová (SVK); W 3–0 | — | | Zhang (CHN); W 3–2 | Kamkasomphou (FRA); L 0–3 | 2nd place, silver medalist(s) |
| Anna-Carin Ahlquist | Singles – Class 3 | Moll (RSA); W 3–1 | Fillou (FRA); L 2–3 | Brunelli (ITA); W 3–1 | Did not advance | | | | |
| Marléen Bengtsson-Kovacs | Singles – Class 8 | Mairie (FRA); L 0–3 | Zhang (CHN); L 0–3 | Rodrigues (BRA); W 3–0 | Did not advance | | | | |
| Ingela Lundbäck | Singles – Class 5 | Tsai (TPE); W 3–0 | Passos (BRA); W 3–0 | Ren (CHN); L 0–3 | Did not advance | | | | |
| Ingela Lundbäck; Anna-Carin Ahlquist | Team – Class 4-5 | — | | | Poland; W 3–1 | China; L 2–3 | Did not advance | | |

== Wheelchair basketball ==
- Men:

Enoch Ablorh, Joachim Gustavsson, Hussein Haidari, Peter Kohlström, Joakim Lindén, Patrik Nylander, Tomas Åkerberg, Niclas Larsson, Per Byquist, Dan Wallin, Thomas Larsson, Robin Meng.

| Team | P | W | D | L | GF | GA | GD | Points |
|---|---|---|---|---|---|---|---|---|
| Canada (CAN) | 5 | 5 | 0 | 0 | 372 | 276 | 96 | 15 |
| Iran (IRI) | 5 | 3 | 0 | 2 | 357 | 344 | 13 | 9 |
| Germany (GER) | 5 | 2 | 0 | 3 | 322 | 292 | 30 | 6 |
| Japan (JPN) | 5 | 2 | 0 | 3 | 265 | 319 | -54 | 6 |
| Sweden (SWE) | 5 | 2 | 0 | 3 | 305 | 305 | 0 | 6 |
| South Africa (RSA) | 5 | 1 | 0 | 4 | 282 | 367 | -85 | 3 |

Group A

September 7
11:15

(Report)

| Japan (JPN) | 49–61 | Sweden (SWE) |

Beijing National Indoor Stadium
Attendance: 1200
Referees: Sebastien Gauthier (CAN)

September 8
15:30

(Report)

| Sweden (SWE) | 66–92 | Iran (IRI) |

Beijing Science and Technology University Gymnasium
Attendance: 1376
Referees: Bill Kuerzi (USA)

September 9
18:30

(Report)

| Canada (CAN) | 62–52 | Sweden (SWE) |

Beijing Science and Technology University Gymnasium
Attendance: 8162
Referees: Gabriele Caligiuri (AUS)

September 10
11:15

(Report)

| Sweden (SWE) | 58–64 | South Africa (RSA) |

Beijing National Indoor Stadium
Attendance: 7262
Referees: Sergio Giordano (CAN)

September 11
13:30

(Report)

| Germany (GER) | 78–72 | Sweden (SWE) |

Beijing National Indoor Stadium
Referees: Antonia Gomez Ruf (ESP)

Classification 9TH-12TH

September 12
09:00

(Report)

| Brazil (BRA) | 75–56 | Sweden (SWE) |

Beijing National Indoor Stadium
Referees: Sebastien Gauthier (CAN)

Classification 11TH-12TH

September 14
15:45

(Report)

| Sweden (SWE) | 63–45 | China (CHN) |

Beijing National Indoor Stadium
Referees: Jorg-Ulrich Otto (GER)

== Wheelchair tennis ==
| Athlete | Event | Round of 64 | Round of 32 | Round of 16 | Quarterfinals | Semifinals | Final | |
| Athlete | Event | Opposition Result | Opposition Result | Opposition Result | Opposition Result | Opposition Result | Opposition Result | Rank |
|---|---|---|---|---|---|---|---|---|
| Stefan Olsson | Men's singles | Yusuf (NGR); W 2–0 | Tenhunen (FIN); W 2–0 | Peifer (FRA); W 2–0 | Kunieda (JPN); L 0–2 | Did not advance | | |
| Peter Wikström | Men's singles | Jaroszewski (POL); W 2–0 | Dobbie (AUS); W 2–0 | Houdet (FRA); L 0–2 | Did not advance | | | |
| Johan Andersson | Quad Singles | — | | Poppen (USA); W 2–0 | Timmermans (NED); W 2–0 | Wagner (USA); W 2–1 | Norfolk (GBR); L 0–2 | 2nd place, silver medalist(s) |
| Christer Jansson | Quad Singles | — | | Kimura (JPN); L 1–2 | Did not advance | | | |
| Stefan Olsson; Peter Wikström | Men's doubles | — | | Hinson / Moran (USA); W 2–0 | Stuurman / Ammerlaan (NED); W 2–0 | Kunieda / Saida (JPN); W 2–1 | Houdet / Jeremaiasz (FRA); L 0–2 | 2nd place, silver medalist(s) |
| Johan Andersson; Christer Jansson | Quad doubles | — | | | Kramer / Weinberg (ISR); L 0–2 | Did not advance | | |

== See also ==
- Sweden at the Paralympics
- Sweden at the 2008 Summer Olympics
