= Beijing Shooting Range Hall =

Sport shooting venue in Beijing, China

Coordinates: 39°56′38″N 116°12′6″E

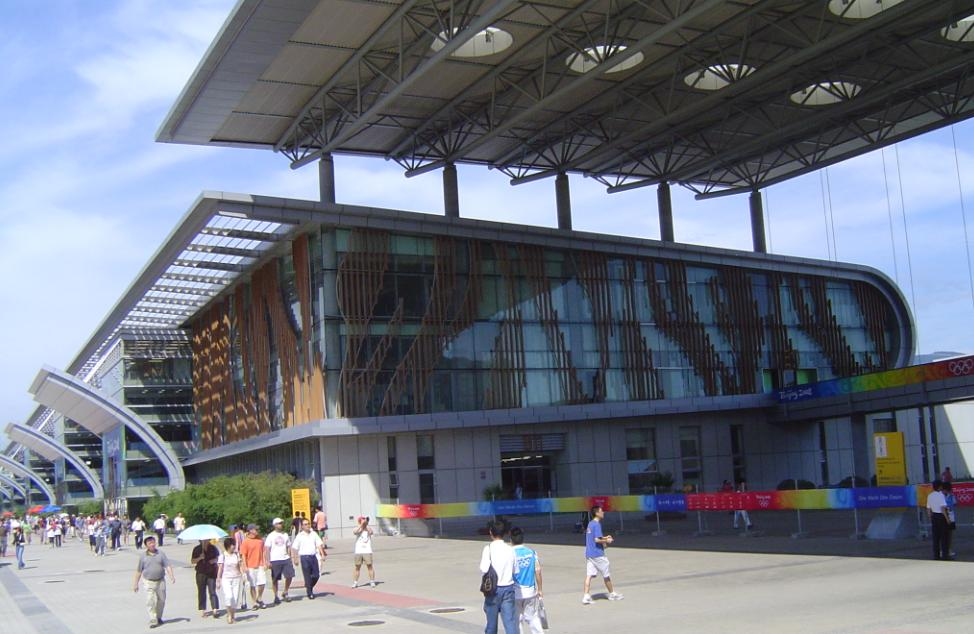
- The Beijing Shooting Range Hall used for the qualification rounds
- Interactive map of Beijing Shooting Range Hall
- Location: Shijingshan District, Beijing
- Owner: State General Administration of Sport
- Capacity: 8,600 (2,170 permanent 6,430 removable)

Construction
- Groundbreaking: July 2004
- Opened: July 2007

The Beijing Shooting Range Hall (simplified Chinese: 北京射击馆; traditional Chinese: 北京射擊館; pinyin: Běijīng Shèjīguǎn) is a shooting hall located in Shijingshan District, Beijing. It hosted the qualifying rounds and finals of ten shooting sports events at the 2008 Summer Olympics, consisting of all 10-, 25- and 50-metre events. It was the venue of the first gold medal awarded at the Beijing 2008 Olympic Games. The entire shooting sports events for the 2008 Summer Paralympics were also held at this venue.

== Overview ==
Construction of the venue broke ground on July 13, 2004 and was completed on July 28, 2007. It was used for a pre-Olympic test event in April 2008 as part of the 2008 ISSF World Cup. The venue, with a total surface area of 45,645 square meters, contains qualification competition halls, a final competition hall, a storehouse, a room for armed police use, a heating and ventilation equipment room, and an electric transformer room.

The qualification competition hall contains 10m, 25m, and 50 m target ranges. The final competition hall contains sealed 10m, 25m, and 50m target ranges.

The venue has a total seating capacity for 8,600 spectators, with 2,170 permanent seats and 6,430 removable seats. The qualification competition halls can seat 6,100 and the final competition hall can seat 2,500.

The Beijing Shooting Range Hall was designed to reflect the shape of a hunting bow. This design takes into consideration the origins of the sport of shooting—hunting in the forest. The Shooting Hall's qualification competition halls and the final competition hall are connected by the venue's main entrance, which contributes to the venue's "bow" shape.

Post-Games, the venue will host important international and Chinese shooting competitions and serve as the training base for the Chinese national shooting team and youth training grounds. Parts of the venue might be used as a national defense teaching facility. Additionally, the venue may be used to promote shooting as a sport to the public and to promote the Olympic spirit.
