= Table tennis at the 2012 Summer Paralympics – Women's individual – Class 3 =

Table tennis Women's C3 at the XIV Paralympic Games
- Venue: ExCeL Exhibition Centre
- Dates: 30 August – 3 September 2012
- Competitors: 20 from 14 nations

Medalists
1st place, gold medalist(s)		Anna-Carin Ahlquist	Sweden
2nd place, silver medalist(s)		Doris Mader	Austria
3rd place, bronze medalist(s)		Alena Kanova	Slovakia

The Women's individual table tennis - Class 3 tournament at the 2012 Summer Paralympics in London took place from 30 August to 3 September 2012 at ExCeL Exhibition Centre. Classes 1-5 were for athletes with a physical impairment that affects their legs, and who competed in a sitting position. The lower the number, the greater the impact the impairment was on an athlete’s ability to compete.

In the preliminary stage, athletes competed in six groups of three. Winners of each group qualified for the quarter-finals, together with two seeded players, who were given byes from the preliminary round.

== Results ==
All times are local (BST/UTC+1)

=== Finals ===
Quarter-finals: 1 Sep 11:45
1	Li Qian (CHN)	11	7	8	11	5
Doris Mader (AUT)	6	11	11	4	11
Sara Head (GBR)	11	10	7	11	11
Mateja Pintar (SLO)	6	12	11	9	3
Alena Kanova (SVK)	13	11	11
Jung Sang Sook (KOR)	11	5	5
Jane Campbell (GBR)	3	3	8
2	Anna-Carin Ahlquist (SWE)	11	11	11

Semifinals: 1 Sep 16:00
Doris Mader (AUT)	11	11	12
Sara Head (GBR)	8	6	10
Alena Kanova (SVK)	4	3	6
2	Anna-Carin Ahlquist (SWE)	11	11	11

Gold medal match: 3 Sep 10:15
Doris Mader (AUT)	4	6	5
2	Anna-Carin Ahlquist (SWE)	11	11	11
Bronze medal match
Sara Head (GBR)	11	5	5	3
Alena Kanova (SVK)	2	11	11	11

=== Preliminary round ===
Qualified for the knock-out stages

==== Group A ====
Athlete	Won	Lost	Games diff	Points diff
Alena Kanova (SVK)	2	0	+6	+36
Helena Dretar Karic (CRO)	1	1	-1	-11
Cho Kyoung Hee (KOR)	0	2	-5	-25

30 August, 10:20

Alena Kanova (SVK)	11	11	11
Cho Kyoung Hee (KOR)	9	4	3

31 August, 10:20

Cho Kyoung Hee (KOR)	7	9	13	7
Helena Dretar Karic (CRO)	11	11	11	11

31 August, 20:00

Alena Kanova (SVK)	11	11	11
Helena Dretar Karic (CRO)	3	6	5

==== Group B ====
Athlete	Won	Lost	Games diff	Points diff
Mateja Pintar (SLO)	2	0	+6	+4
Marie-Christine Fillou (FRA)	1	1	-2	+10
Hatice Duman (TUR)	0	2	-4	-14

30 August, 10:20

Mateja Pintar (SLO)	4	6	13	13	11
Marie-Christine Fillou (FRA)	11	11	11	11	7

31 August, 10:20

Marie-Christine Fillou (FRA)	11	14	9	11
Hatice Duman (TUR)	7	12	11	9

31 August, 20:00

Mateja Pintar (SLO)	9	11	11	11
Hatice Duman (TUR)	11	8	8	7

==== Group C ====
Athlete	Won	Lost	Games diff	Points diff
Jung Sang Sook (KOR)	2	0	+5	+18
Andela Muzinic (CRO)	1	1	-2	-13
Pamela Fontaine (USA)	0	2	-3	-5

30 August, 10:20

Jung Sang Sook (KOR)	11	5	11	12
Pamela Fontaine (USA)	8	11	7	10

31 August, 11:00

Pamela Fontaine (USA)	11	8	7	12	7
Andela Muzinic (CRO)	4	11	11	10	11

31 August, 20:00

Jung Sang Sook (KOR)	11	11	11
Andela Muzinic (CRO)	9	8	1

==== Group D ====
Athlete	Won	Lost	Games diff	Points diff
Sara Head (GBR)	2	0	+2	0
Michela Brunelli (ITA)	1	1	+2	+7
Choi Hyun Ja (KOR)	0	2	-4	-7

30 August, 10:20

Sara Head (GBR)	8	11	5	11	11
Choi Hyun Ja (KOR)	11	9	11	9	5

31 August, 11:00

Choi Hyun Ja (KOR)	11	9	15
Michela Brunelli (ITA)	13	11	17

31 August, 20:00

Sara Head (GBR)	13	6	11	9	11
Michela Brunelli (ITA)	11	11	9	11	9

==== Group E ====
Athlete	Won	Lost	Games diff	Points diff
Jane Campbell (GBR)	2	0	+3	+7
Nergiz Altintas (TUR)	1	1	-1	-4
Edith Sigala (MEX)	0	2	-2	-3

30 August, 11:00

Nergiz Altintas (TUR)	11	8	11	11	11
Edith Sigala (MEX)	8	11	13	7	9

31 August, 11:00

Edith Sigala (MEX)	9	11	11	8	9
Jane Campbell (GBR)	11	8	6	11	11

31 August, 20:40

Nergiz Altintas (TUR)	9	11	5	6
Jane Campbell (GBR)	11	6	11	11

==== Group F ====
Athlete	Won	Lost	Games diff	Points diff
Doris Mader (AUT)	2	0	+4	+21
Fanny Bertrand (FRA)	1	1	+2	+2
Pattaravadee Wararitdamrongkul (THA)	0	2	-6	-23

30 August, 11:00

Doris Mader (AUT)	11	11	11
Pattaravadee Wararitdamrongkul (THA)	7	4	8

31 August, 11:00

Pattaravadee Wararitdamrongkul (THA)	7	9	8
Fanny Bertrand (FRA)	11	11	11

31 August, 20:40

Doris Mader (AUT)	8	11	12	13	11
Fanny Bertrand (FRA)	11	13	10	11	3
