= South Korea at the 2012 Summer Paralympics =

- IPC code: KOR
- NPC: Korean Paralympic Committee
- Website: www.kosad.or.kr (in Korean)

in London
- Competitors: 88 in 13 sports
- Medals Ranked 12th: Gold 9 Silver 9 Bronze 9 Total 27

Summer Paralympics appearances (overview)
- 1968; 1972; 1976; 1980; 1984; 1988; 1992; 1996; 2000; 2004; 2008; 2012; 2016; 2020; 2024

South Korea competed in the 2012 Summer Paralympics in London, United Kingdom, from 29 August to 9 September 2012.

== Medalists ==
Medal	Name	Sport	Event	Date
Gold	Kim Ran Sook; Ko Hee Sook; Lee Hwa Sook	Archery	Women's team recurve	5 September
Gold	Choi Ye-Jin	Boccia	Individual BC3	8 September
Gold	Gwang-Geun Choi	Judo	Men's 100 kg	1 September
Gold	Park Sea-Kyun	Shooting	Men's 10m air pistol SH1	30 August
Gold	Park Sea-Kyun	Shooting	Mixed 50m pistol SH1	6 September
Gold	Kang Ju-Young	Shooting	Mixed 10m air rifle standing SH2	2 September
Gold	Min Byeong-Eon	Swimming	Men's 50 metre backstroke S3	8 September
Gold	Lim Woo-Geun	Swimming	Men's 100 metre breaststroke SB5	5 September
Gold	Kim Young-Gun	Table tennis	Men's individual - Class 4	3 September
Silver	Jung Young Joo; Kim Suk Ho; Lee Myeong-Gu	Archery	Men's team recurve	5 September
Silver	Lee Hwa Sook	Archery	Women's individual recurve standing	4 September
Silver	Jeon Min-Jae	Athletics	Women's 100 metres T36	8 September
Silver	Jeon Min-Jae	Athletics	Women's 200 metres T36	1 September
Silver	Ho-Won Jeong	Boccia	Individual BC3	8 September
Silver	Kim Kyung-Mook	Table tennis	Men's individual - Class 2	3 September
Silver	Song Byung-Jun	Table tennis	Men's individual - Class 11	3 September
Silver	Choi Il Sang; Jung Eun Chang; Kim Jung Gil; Kim Young Gun	Table tennis	Men's team - Class 4-5	8 September
Silver	Cho Kyoung Hee; Choi Hyun Ja; Jung Sang Sook	Table tennis	Women's team - Class 1-3	7 September
Bronze	Kim Gyu Dae	Athletics	Men's 1500 metres T54	4 September
Bronze	So-Yeong Jeong	Boccia	Individual BC2	8 September
Bronze	Chun Keun-Bae	Powerlifting	Men's +100 kg	5 September
Bronze	Lee Ju-Hee	Shooting	Men's 10m air pistol SH1	30 August
Bronze	Wonsang Cho	Swimming	Men's 200 metre freestyle S14	2 September
Bronze	Jung Eun-Chang	Table tennis	Men's individual - Class 5	2 September
Bronze	Kim Kong Yong; Kim Kyung Mook; Kim Min-gyu; Lee Chang Ho	Table tennis	Men's team - Class 1-2	7 September
Bronze	Moon Sung-Hye	Table tennis	Women's individual - Class 4	2 September
Bronze	Jung Ji Nam; Jung Young-A; Moon Sung-Hye	Table tennis	Women's team - Class 4-5	8 September

== Archery ==
Men

Athlete	Event	Ranking round		Round of 32	Round of 16	Quarterfinals	Semifinals	Finals	
Athlete	Event	Score	Seed	Opposition score	Opposition score	Opposition score	Opposition score	Opposition score	Rank
Ouk Soo Lee	Men's individual compound open	647	14	Larsson (SWE); L 3-7	did not advance				
Jung Young Joo	Men's individual recurve W1/W2	607	6	Bye	Marin Rodriguez (ESP); W 6-2	Sanawi (MAS); L 4-6	did not advance		
Lee Myeong-Gu	Men's individual recurve W1/W2	610	5	Bye	Szarszewski (GER); W 6-0	de Pellegrin (ITA); L 4-6	did not advance		
You In Sik	Men's individual recurve W1/W2	581	14	Sanawi (MAS); L 2-6	did not advance				
Jung Young Joo; Kim Suk Ho; Lee Myeong-Gu	Men's team recurve	1811	5	—N/a		Iran (IRI); W 195-192	Great Britain (GBR); W 197-190	Russia (RUS); L 200-206	2nd place, silver medalist(s)

Women

Athlete	Event	Ranking round		Round of 32	Round of 16	Quarterfinals	Semifinals	Finals	
Athlete	Event	Score	Seed	Opposition score	Opposition score	Opposition score	Opposition score	Opposition score	Rank
Ko Hee Sook	Women's individual recurve W1/W2	548	5	Bye	Floreno (ITA); L 2-6	did not advance			
Lee Hwa Sook	Women's individual recurve standing	555	4	Bye	Tzika (GRE); W 6-0	Comte (SUI); W 6-4	Byambasuren (MGL); W 7-3	Yan H (CHN); L 4-6	2nd place, silver medalist(s)
Kim Ran Sook	Women's individual recurve standing	536	7	Bye	Batorova (RUS); L 4-6	did not advance			
Kim Ran Sook; Ko Hee Sook; Lee Hwa Sook	Women's team recurve	1639	3	—N/a		Great Britain (GBR); W 188-153	Iran (IRI); W 192-186	China (CHN); W 199-193	1st place, gold medalist(s)

== Athletics ==
=== Men's track ===
Athlete	Event	Heats		Final	
Athlete	Event	Result	Rank	Result	Rank
Hong Suk Man	800m T54	1:39.88	16	did not advance	
Hong Suk Man	1500m T54	3:19.72	16	did not advance	
Hong Suk Man	5000m T54	11:29.32	7 Q	11:10.23	9
Jung Dong-Ho	100m T53	16.24	11	did not advance	
Jung Dong-Ho	200m T53	26.94 PB	11	did not advance	
Jung Dong-Ho	400m T53	50.02 PB	3 q	51.45	7
Kim Gyu Dae	800m T54	1:37.90	4 q	1:39.03	4
Kim Gyu Dae	1500m T54	3:14.90	4 Q	3:12.57	3rd place, bronze medalist(s)
Kim Gyu Dae	5000m T54	10:56.94	4 q	11:08.95	6
Yoo Byung-Hoon	200m T53	27.32 SB	12	did not advance	
Yoo Byung-Hoon	400m T53	52.06	8 q	51.30	6
Yoo Byung-Hoon	800m T53	1:42.20 SB	2 Q	1:42.44	5
Hong Suk Man; Jung Dong-Ho; Kim Gyu Dae; Yoo Byung-Hoon	4x400m relay T53-54	—N/a		3:13.82	4

=== Women's track ===
Athlete	Event	Heats		Final	
Athlete	Event	Result	Rank	Result	Rank
Jeon Min-Jae	100m T36	14.81	2 Q	14.70	2nd place, silver medalist(s)
Jeon Min-Jae	200m T36	30.67	2 Q	31.08	2nd place, silver medalist(s)

=== Women's field ===
Athlete	Event	Final		
Athlete	Event	Result	Points	Rank
Kim Sun Jeong	Club throw F31/32/51	10.98	800	9

== Boccia ==
Athlete	Event	Seeding matches	Round of 32	Round of 16	Quarterfinals	Semifinals	Finals	
Athlete	Event	Opposition Score	Opposition Score	Opposition Score	Opposition Score	Opposition Score	Opposition Score	Rank
Kwang-Min Ji	Mixed individual BC1	Bye		Chagas de Oliveira (BRA); L 3-3	did not advance			
Myeong-Su Kim	Mixed individual BC1	Bye		Soulanis (GRE); W 5-0	Chagas de Oliveira (BRA); L 1-7	5-8th place matches Fernandes (POR); L 2-3	7-8th place match Haudpradit (THA); L 0-11	8
So-Yeong Jeong	Mixed individual BC2	Bye		Ferreira (POR); W 5-4	Hiu (HKG); W 5-4	Yan Z (CHN); L 2-5	Bronze medal match Zhong K (CHN); W 5-1	3rd place, bronze medalist(s)
Jeong-Min Sohn	Mixed individual BC2	Bye	Jitsa Ngiem (THA); W 5-4	Vongsa (THA); W 7-2	Sousa Santos (BRA); L 5-5	5-8th place matches Valente (POR); L 2-3	7-8th place match Murray (GBR); L 2-7	8
Ye-Jin Choi	Mixed individual BC3	Bye	Pananos (GRE); W 10-0	L Silva (POR); W 10-1	Polychronidis (GRE); W 7-2	Kim H-S (KOR); W 8-0	Jeong H-W (KOR); W 4-3	1st place, gold medalist(s)
Ho-Won Jeong	Mixed individual BC3	Bye		McCowan (GBR); W 6-1	Costa (POR); W 5-1	Macedo (POR); W 2-2	Choi (KOR); L 3-4	2nd place, silver medalist(s)
Kim Han-soo	Mixed individual BC3	Bye		Cilissen (BEL); W 5-2	Taha (SIN); W 3-3	Choi (KOR); L 0-8	Macedo (POR); L 2-3	4

=== Pairs and team events ===
Athlete	Event	Pool matches				Quarterfinals	Semifinals	Finals	
Athlete	Event	Opposition Score	Opposition Score	Opposition Score	Rank	Opposition Score	Opposition Score	Opposition Score	Rank
Ye-Jin Choi; Ho-Won Jeong; Kim Han-soo	Pairs BC3	Greece (GRE); W 11-0	Canada (CAN); L 4-5	Great Britain (GBR); W 6-2	1 Q	—N/a	Portugal (POR); L 3-4	Belgium (BEL); L 3-4	4
So-Yeong Jeong; Kwang-Min Ji; Myeong-Su Kim; Jeong-Min Sohn	Team BC1-2	Brazil (BRA); W 10-3	Ireland (IRL); W 14-3	—N/a	1 Q	China (CHN); L 6-6	did not advance		

== Cycling ==
Road cycling

Athlete	Event	Time	Rank
Jin Yong Sik	Men's road time trial C3	25:38.03	12
Jin Yong Sik	Men's road race C1-3	1:48:13	22
Kim Jung Im	Women's road time trial H3	43:25.32	7
Kim Jung Im	Women's road race H1-3	Lapped (8 km)	

Track cycling

Athlete	Event	Qualification		1st round		Final	
Athlete	Event	Time	Rank	Time	Rank	Opposition Time	Rank
Jin Yong Sik	Men's individual pursuit C3	3:57.694	11	did not advance			

== Goalball ==
South Korea qualified a men's team of six players.

=== Men's tournament ===
Group B

Team	Pld	W	D	L	GF	GA	GD	Pts	Qualification
Iran	5	4	0	1	32	20	+12	12	Quarterfinals
China	5	3	1	1	20	14	+6	10	Quarterfinals
Belgium	5	3	1	1	19	16	+3	10	Quarterfinals
Algeria	5	2	0	3	18	17	+1	6	Quarterfinals
South Korea	5	1	0	4	18	28	−10	3	Eliminated
Canada	5	1	0	4	16	28	−12	3	Eliminated

Source: "London 2012 Paralympic Games - Goalball results" (PDF). Paralympic.org. 2012-10-03 – via Goalball.sport.

30 August 2012; 15:00	South Korea	4 – 3	Algeria	Copper Box, London; Referees: Kimberly Anderson (USA), Carla Da Matta (BRA)
30 August 2012; 15:00	Hong 4	Report	Mokrane 2 Larbi 1	Copper Box, London; Referees: Kimberly Anderson (USA), Carla Da Matta (BRA)

31 August 2012; 18:30	China	11 – 4	South Korea	Copper Box, London; Referees: Morten Hammershoi (DEN), Christl Daentler (GER)
31 August 2012; 18:30	Yao 6 Chen 5	Report	C-H Kim 2 N-O Kim 1 Hong 1	Copper Box, London; Referees: Morten Hammershoi (DEN), Christl Daentler (GER)

1 September 2012; 16:15	Canada	5 – 4	South Korea	Copper Box, London; Referees: Kimberly Anderson (USA), Shinji Mizuno (JPN)
1 September 2012; 16:15	Gaulin 3 Caron 2	Report	C-H Kim 2 Hong 1 J-W Oh 1	Copper Box, London; Referees: Kimberly Anderson (USA), Shinji Mizuno (JPN)

2 September 2012; 13:45	Iran	4 – 3	South Korea	Copper Box, London; Referees: Janne Ahokas (FIN), Dawna Christy (CAN)
2 September 2012; 13:45	Sayahi 4	Report	Hong SW 2 Kim CH 1	Copper Box, London; Referees: Janne Ahokas (FIN), Dawna Christy (CAN)

3 September 2012; 09:00	South Korea	3 – 5	Belgium	Copper Box, London; Referees: Juha Vuokila (FIN), Morten Hammershoi (DEN)
3 September 2012; 09:00	Kim C.-H. 2 Hong 1	Report	B. Vanhove 2 Bihi 2 Mapreni 1	Copper Box, London; Referees: Juha Vuokila (FIN), Morten Hammershoi (DEN)

== Judo ==
Athlete	Event	Preliminary	Quarterfinals	Semifinals	Repechage round 1	Repechage round 2	Final/ Bronze medal contest
Athlete	Event	Opposition Result	Opposition Result	Opposition Result	Opposition Result	Opposition Result	Opposition Result
Lee Min-jae	Men's 60kg	—N/a			Karn (CAN); W 0100–0004	—N/a	Noura (ALG); L 0010-0110
Choi Gwang-Guen	Men's 100kg	Bye	Ingram (GBR); W 0132-0011	Alizadeh (IRI); W 0100-0001	—N/a		Porter (USA); W 0100-0001 (gold)
Park Jung-Min	Men's +100kg	—N/a	Song W (CHN); L 0000-0100	—N/a	Nadri (IRI); L 0004-0100	did not advance	

== Powerlifting ==
Men

Athlete	Event	Result	Rank
Chun Keun Bae	+100kg	232.0	3rd place, bronze medalist(s)

Women

Athlete	Event	Result	Rank
Choi Hyun Hee	-60kg	85.0	7
Lee Hyun-Jung	+82.5kg	103.0	7
Shin Jeong Hee	-48kg	NMR	

== Rowing ==
Athlete	Event	Heats		Repechage		Final	
Athlete	Event	Time	Rank	Time	Rank	Time	Rank
Park Jun-Ha	Men’s Single Sculls	5:01.70	2 R	5:00.72	2 FA	5:02.22	5
Lee Jongrye	Women’s Single Sculls	5:45.82	4 R	5:52.74	3 FB	5:57.86	1

== Shooting ==
Men

Athlete	Event	Qualification		Final		
Athlete	Event	Score	Rank	Score	Total	Rank
Jae Yong Sim	Men's 10m air rifle standing SH1	583	14	did not advance		
Jeon Youngjun	Mixed 10m air rifle prone SH2	600	1 Q	104.6	704.6	8
Jeon Youngjun	Mixed 10m air rifle standing SH2	598	8 Q	104.9	702.9	6
Kang Juyoung	Mixed 10m air rifle prone SH2	599	12	did not advance		
Kang Juyoung	Mixed 10m air rifle standing SH2	600	3 Q	105.5	705.5 PR	1st place, gold medalist(s)
Lee Jiseok	Mixed 10m air rifle prone SH2	600	1 Q	105.4	705.4	6
Lee Jiseok	Mixed 10m air rifle standing SH2	598	10	did not advance		
Lee Ju-Hee	Men's 10m air pistol SH1	568	2 Q	94.7	662.7	3rd place, bronze medalist(s)
Lee Ju-Hee	Mixed 25m pistol SH1	562	6 Q	200.6	762.6	5
Lee Ju-Hee	Mixed 50m pistol SH1	514	19	did not advance		
Lee Seung-Chul	Men's 10m air rifle standing SH1	591	5 Q	102.4	693.4	4
Park Sea-Kyun	Men's 10m air pistol SH1	567	3 Q	97.7	664.7	1st place, gold medalist(s)
Park Sea-Kyun	Mixed 25m pistol SH1	559	8 Q	185.8	744.8	8
Park Sea-Kyun	Mixed 50m pistol SH1	550	1 Q	92.4	642.4	1st place, gold medalist(s)
Seo Young-Kyun	Men's 10m air pistol SH1	554	19	did not advance		
Seo Young-Kyun	Mixed 50m pistol SH1	522	12	did not advance		
Shim Young-Jip	Men's 10m air rifle standing SH1	593	4 Q	99.9	692.9	5
Shim Young-Jip	Men's 50m rifle 3 positions SH1	1148	4 Q	97.7	1245.7	4
Shim Young-Jip	Mixed 50m rifle prone SH1	589	8 Q	99.7	688.7	8
Sim Jae Yong	Men's 50m rifle 3 positions SH1	1136	5 Q	99.9	1235.9	5
Sim Jae Yong	Mixed 10m air rifle prone SH1	—N/a		105.6	705.6	4
Sim Jae Yong	Mixed 50m rifle prone SH1	589	4 Q	103.1	692.1	5

Women

Athlete	Event	Qualification		Final		
Athlete	Event	Score	Rank	Score	Total	Rank
Lee Yoojeong	Women's 10 m air rifle standing SH1	391	5 Q	100.9	491.9	6
Lee Yoojeong	Women's 50m rifle 3 positions SH1	556	8 Q	82.7	648.5	8
Lee Yun-ri	Women's 10 m air rifle standing SH1	391	6 Q	101.3	492.3	4
Lee Yun-ri	Women's 50m rifle 3 positions SH1	567	4 Q	91.0	668.6	4
Lee Yun-ri	Mixed 50m rifle prone SH1	578	30	did not advance		
Park Myung-soon	Women's 10 m air pistol SH1	369	6 Q	99.6	468.6	5

== Swimming ==
Men

Athletes	Event	Heat		Final	
Athletes	Event	Time	Rank	Time	Rank
Cho Wonsang	200m freestyle S14	2:00.47	3 Q	1:59.93	3rd place, bronze medalist(s)
Jung Yang Mook	200m freestyle S14	2:09.98	18	did not advance	
Jung Yang Mook	100m breaststroke SB14	1:10.16	5 Q	1:09.74	4
Kim Kyung Hyun	50m freestyle S4	40.37	6 Q	42.49	8
Kim Kyung Hyun	100m freestyle S4	1:31.03	9	did not advance	
Kim Kyung Hyun	200m freestyle S4	3:05.65	3 Q	3:07.74	6
Lee In Kook	200m freestyle S14	2:08.18	14	did not advance	
Lim Woo-Geun	100m breaststroke SB5	1:34.94	1 Q	1:34.06	1st place, gold medalist(s)
Min Byeong-Eon	50m backstroke S3	45.65	1 Q	42.51	1st place, gold medalist(s)
Min Byeong-Eon	50m breaststroke SB2	1:10.22	12	did not advance	
Min Byeong-Eon	150m individual medley SM3	3:10.18	5 Q	3:09.96	7

Women

Athletes	Event	Heat		Final	
Athletes	Event	Time	Rank	Time	Rank
Jeon Mik Young	50m backstroke S4	1:06.97	9	did not advance	
Kim Jieun	50m freestyle S7	36.25	9	did not advance	
Kim Jieun	100m freestyle S7	1:17.80	7 Q	1:18.03	8
Kim Jieun	100m backstroke S7	1:33.41	11	did not advance	
Park Semi	50m freestyle S10	31.02	16	did not advance	
Park Semi	100m freestyle S10	1:08.13	15	did not advance	

== Table tennis ==
=== Men ===
Athlete	Event	Preliminaries			Quarterfinals	Semifinals	Final / BM	
Athlete	Event	Opposition Result	Opposition Result	Rank	Opposition Result	Opposition Result	Opposition Result	Rank
Cho Jae Kwan	Men's singles C1	Nikelis (GER); L 1-3	Keller (SUI); L 1-3	3	did not advance			
Lee Chang Ho	Men's singles C1	Eberhardt (ARG); W 3-1	Guezenec (FRA); W 3-1	1 Q	—N/a	Ducay (FRA); L 0-3	P Davies (GBR); L 2-3	4
Kim Kong Yong	Men's singles C2	Riapoš (SVK); L 1-3	Vella (ITA); W 3-1	2	did not advance			
Kim Kyung Mook	Men's singles C2	Janfeshan (IRI); W 3-0	Ruep (AUT); W 3-0	1 Q	Bye	Poddubnyy (RUS); W 3-0	Riapoš (SVK); L 1-3	2nd place, silver medalist(s)
Kim Min-gyu	Men's singles C2	Gao Y (CHN); W 3-0	Espindola (BRA); W 3-0	1 Q	Lamirault (FRA); L 0-3	did not advance		
Jeyoung Young Ill	Men's singles C3	Zhao P (CHN); L 1-3	Guertler (GER); W 3-0	2	did not advance			
Kim Jeong Seok	Men's singles C3	Schmidberger (GER); L 0-3	Guilhem (FRA); W 3-1	2	did not advance			
Kim Jin-sung	Men's singles C3	Feng (CHN); L 0-3	Hadrava (CZE); W 3-2	2	did not advance			
Choi Il Sang	Men's singles C4	Siada (ISR); W 3-0	Caci (ITA); L 0-3	1 Q	Zhang Y (CHN); L 2-3	did not advance		
Kim Jung Gil	Men's singles C4	Martin (FRA); L 1-3	Ko (TPE); W 3-0	2	did not advance			
Kim Young Gun	Men's singles C4	Bye			Martin (FRA); W 3-0	Saleh (EGY); W 3-1	Zhang Y (CHN); W 3-1	1st place, gold medalist(s)
Jung Eun Chang	Men's singles C5	Lin (TPE); W 3-2	Fetir (EGY); W 3-1	1 Q	—N/a	Urhaug (NOR); L 0-3	Rosec (FRA); W 3-0	3rd place, bronze medalist(s)
Kim Byoung Young	Men's singles C5	Cetin (GER); L 2-3	Rosec (FRA); L 1-3	3	did not advance			
Park Hong Kyu	Men's singles C6	Esaulov (RUS); L 1-3	Michell (BRA); W 3-0	2	did not advance			
Kim Young Sung	Men's singles C7	Popov (UKR); L 0-3	Karabardak (GBR); L 0-3	2	did not advance			
Son Byeongjun	Men's singles C11	Palos (HUN); W 3-1	Kinoshita (JPN); W 3-0	1 Q	—N/a	Olejarski (POL); W 3-1	Palos (HUN); L 1-3	2nd place, silver medalist(s)

=== Women ===
Athlete	Event	Preliminaries				Quarterfinals	Semifinals	Final / BM	
Athlete	Event	Opposition Result	Opposition Result	Opposition Result	Rank	Opposition Result	Opposition Result	Opposition Result	Rank
Cho Kyoung Hee	Women's singles C3	Kánová (SVK); L 0-3	Dretar Karic (CRO); L 1-3	—N/a	3	did not advance			
Choi Hyun Ja	Women's singles C3	Head (GBR); L 2-3	Brunelli (ITA); L 1-3	—N/a	3	did not advance			
Jung Sang Sook	Women's singles C3	Muzinic (CRO); W 3-0	Fontaine (USA); W 3-1	—N/a	1 Q	Kánová (SVK); L 0-3	did not advance		
Jung Ji Nam	Women's singles C4	Perić-Ranković (SRB); L 0-3	Al-Azzam (JOR); L 0-3	—N/a	3	did not advance			
Moon Sung Hye	Women's singles C4	Gilroy (GBR); W 3-1	Ahmed (EGY); W 3-0	—N/a	1 Q	—N/a	Zhou Y (CHN); L 0-3	Zhang M (CHN); W 3-2	3rd place, bronze medalist(s)
Jung Young-a	Women's singles C5	Zhang B (CHN); L 2-3	Passos (BRA); W 3-0	—N/a	2	did not advance			
Jang Eun Bong	Women's singles C6	Khodzynska (UKR); L 0-3	Chebankia (RUS); L 1-3	Marszal (POL); L 0-3	4	did not advance			

=== Teams ===
Athlete	Event	First Round	Quarterfinals	Semifinals	Final / BM	
Athlete	Event	Opposition Result	Opposition Result	Opposition Result	Opposition Result	Rank
Kim Kong Yong; Kim Kyung Mook; Kim Min-gyu	Men's team C1-2	Bye		France (FRA); L 2-3	Austria (AUT); W 3-0	3rd place, bronze medalist(s)
Kim Jeong Seok; Kim Jin-sung	Men's team C3	—N/a	Austria (AUT); W 3-1	China (CHN); L 0-3	France (FRA); L 1-3	4
Choi Il Sang; Jung Eun Chang; Kim Jung Gil; Kim Young Gun	Men's team C4-5	Bye	Czech Republic (CZE); W 3-0	Chinese Taipei (TPE); W 3-0	China (CHN); L 1-3	2nd place, silver medalist(s)
Kim Young Sung; Park Hong Kyu	Men's team 6-8	Spain (ESP); L 0-3	did not advance			
Cho Kyoung Hee; Choi Hyun Ja; Jung Sang Sook	Women's team C1-3	Bye	Croatia (CRO); W 3-1	Great Britain (GBR); W 3-0	China (CHN); L 0-3	2nd place, silver medalist(s)
Jung Ji Nam; Jung Young-a; Moon Sung Hye	Women's team C4-5	Bye	Slovenia (SLO); W 3-0	Sweden (SWE); L 1-3	Serbia (SRB); W 3-1	3rd place, bronze medalist(s)

== Wheelchair Fencing ==
Athlete	Event	Qualification			Quarterfinal	Semifinal	Final / BM	
Athlete	Event	Opposition	Score	Rank	Opposition Score	Opposition Score	Opposition Score	Rank
Kim Sun-Mi	Women's épée A	Efimova (RUS)	L 2-5	4 Q	Yu CY (HKG); L 9-15	did not advance		
Kim Sun-Mi	Women's épée A	Yu CY (HKG)	L 4-5	4 Q	Yu CY (HKG); L 9-15	did not advance		
Kim Sun-Mi	Women's épée A	Juhasz (HUN)	W 5-4	4 Q	Yu CY (HKG); L 9-15	did not advance		
Kim Sun-Mi	Women's épée A	Poignet (FRA)	W 5-4	4 Q	Yu CY (HKG); L 9-15	did not advance		
Kim Sun-Mi	Women's épée A	Morel (CAN)	W 5-2	4 Q	Yu CY (HKG); L 9-15	did not advance		

== Wheelchair Tennis ==
Men

Athlete	Event	Round of 64	Round of 32	Round of 16	Quarterfinals	Semifinals	Finals
Athlete	Event	Opposition Result	Opposition Result	Opposition Result	Opposition Result	Opposition Result	Opposition Result
Lee Ha-Gel	Men's singles	Pellegrina (SUI); W 6–1, 6–1	Olsson (SWE); L 1-6, 2-6	did not advance			
Oh Sang-ho	Men's singles	Legner (AUT); L 1-6, 1-6	did not advance				
Lee Ha-Gel; Oh Sang-ho	Men's doubles	—N/a	Alves Rodrigues (BRA) / Medeiros Gomes (BRA); W 6-4, 7-6	Egberink (NED) / Scheffers (NED); L 2-6, 3-6	did not advance		

Women

Athlete	Event	Round of 32	Round of 16	Quarterfinals	Semifinals	Finals
Athlete	Event	Opposition Result	Opposition Result	Opposition Result	Opposition Result	Opposition Result
Hwang Myung-Hee	Women's singles	Kaiser (USA); L 2-6, 6-3, 5-7	did not advance			
Park Ju-Youn	Women's singles	Okabe (JPN); W 6-2, 6-0	Ellerbrock (GER); L 1-6, 4-6	did not advance		
Hwang Myung-Hee; Park Ju-Youn	Women's Doubles	—N/a	Jacinto Velez (ESP) / Ochoa Ribes (ESP); W 6-1, -5	Griffioen (NED) / van Koot (NED); L 0-6, 2-6	did not advance	

== See also ==
- South Korea at the Paralympics
- South Korea at the 2012 Summer Olympics
