= Croatia at the 2020 Summer Paralympics =

- IPC code: CRO
- NPC: Croatian Paralympic Committee
- Website: www.hpo.hr

in Tokyo
- Competitors: 22 in 8 sports
- Medals: Gold 0 Silver 3 Bronze 4 Total 7

Summer Paralympics appearances (overview)
- 1992; 1996; 2000; 2004; 2008; 2012; 2016; 2020; 2024

Other related appearances
- Yugoslavia (1972–2000)

Croatia competed at the 2020 Summer Paralympics in Tokyo, Japan, from 24 August to 5 September 2021.

== Medalists ==
Medal	Name	Sport	Event	Date
Silver	Velimir Šandor	Athletics	Men's discus throw F52	29 August
Silver	Ivan Katanušić	Athletics	Men's discus throw F64	2 September
Silver	Ivan Mikulić	Taekwondo	Men's +75 kg	4 September
Bronze	Anđela Mužinić; Helena Dretar Karić	Table tennis	Women's team – Class 1–3	1 September
Bronze	Dino Sinovčić	Swimming	Men's 100 metre backstroke S6	3 September
Bronze	Mikela Ristoski	Athletics	Women's long jump T20	3 September
Bronze	Deni Černi	Athletics	Men's shot put F33	4 September

== Competitors ==
The following is the list of number of competitors participating in the Games:

Sport	Men	Women	Total
Athletics	8	2	10
Boccia	1	0	1
Judo	0	1	1
Shooting	1	0	1
Swimming	3	1	4
Table tennis	1	2	3
Taekwondo	1	0	1
Triathlon	1	0	1
Total	16	6	22

== Athletics ==
Three Croatian athletes (Ivan Katanušić, Miljenko Vučić, Matija Sloup and Mikela Ristoski) qualified for the 2020 Paralympics after breaking the qualification limit. Zoran Talić, Deni Černi, Velimir Šandor, Marijan Presečan, Ana Gradečak and Vladimir Gašpar will also compete.

Field events

Athlete	Event	Final	
Athlete	Event	Distance	Position
Miljenko Vučić	Men's shot put F11	13.17	4
Deni Černi	Men's shot put F33	11.25	3rd place, bronze medalist(s)
Matija Sloup	Men's shot put F40	10.60	4
Marijan Presečan	Men's shot put F53	7.53	6
Velimir Šandor	Men's discus throw F52	19.98	2nd place, silver medalist(s)
Ivan Katanušić	Men's discus throw F64	55.06	2nd place, silver medalist(s)
Vladimir Gašpar	Men's javelin throw F41	36.54	7
Zoran Talić	Men's long jump T20	6.82	5
Ana Gradečak	Women's shot put F41	8.07	8
Mikela Ristoski	Women's long jump T20	5.46	3rd place, bronze medalist(s)

== Boccia ==
Davor Komar get a ticker for Croatia in Individual BC4 events.

Athlete	Event	Group stage				Quarterfinal	Semifinal	Final / BM	
Athlete	Event	Opposition Score	Opposition Score	Opposition Score	Rank	Opposition Score	Opposition Score	Opposition Score	Rank
Davor Komar	Mixed individual BC4	Lau (HKG); L 3–4	Strehársky (SVK); W 5–2	Levine (CAN); W 8–2	2	Did not advance			

== Judo ==
Lucija Brešković received invitation from IBSA.

Athlete	Event	Round of 16	Quarterfinals	Semifinals	Repechage 1	Repechage 2	Final / BM	
Athlete	Event	Opposition Result	Opposition Result	Opposition Result	Opposition Result	Opposition Result	Opposition Result	Rank
Lucija Brešković	−70 kg	Uluçam (TUR); L 00–10	Did not advance		Zabrodskaia (RPC); L 00–10	Did not advance		7

== Paratriathlon ==
Antonio Franko qualified for PTS4 event as one of the top nine ranked athletes on the ITU Paralympic Qualification Ranking List.

Athlete	Event	Swim (0.75 km)	Trans 1	Bike (20 km)	Trans 2	Run (5 km)	Total Time	Rank
Antonio Franko	Men's PTS4	11:16	2:08	31:47	1:19	19:19	1:05:49	5

== Shooting ==
Athlete	Event	Qualification		Final	
Athlete	Event	Score	Rank	Score	Rank
Damir Bošnjak	P1 Men's 10m air pistol SH1	544 - 6x	22	Did not advance	
Damir Bošnjak	P3 Mixed 25m air pistol SH1	554 - 12x	17	Did not advance	
Damir Bošnjak	P4 Mixed 50m air pistol SH1	497 - 5x	32	Did not advance	

== Swimming ==
Three Croatian swimmer has successfully entered the paralympic slot after breaking the MQS (Dino Sinovčić, Kristijan Vincetić, Tomi Brajša). In July 2021, Paula Novina received invitation from World Para Swimming for 100m breaststroke SB8 event.

Athlete	Event	Heats		Final	
Athlete	Event	Result	Rank	Result	Rank
Dino Sinovčić	Men's 100 m freestyle S6	1:13.26	14	Did not advance	
Dino Sinovčić	Men's 100 m backstroke S6	1:16.74	3 Q	1:15.74	3rd place, bronze medalist(s)
Tomi Brajša	Men's 50 m freestyle S4	48.33	17	Did not advance	
Tomi Brajša	Men's 200 m freestyle S4	3:32.14	12	Did not advance	
Kristijan Vincetić	Men's 100 m butterfly S9	1:02.68	9	Did not advance	
Paula Novina	Women's 100 m breaststroke SB8	1:31.62	9	Did not advance	

== Table tennis ==
Croatia entered three athletes into the table tennis competition at the games. Anđela Mužinić qualified via World Ranking allocation. In May 2021, after withdrawal of current European champion in M7, the Regional Slot has been reallocated to Pavao Jozić. In June 2021, Helena Dretar Karić received invitation from International Table Tennis Federation.

Men

Athlete	Event	Group stage			Round of 16	Quarterfinals	Semifinals	Final	
Athlete	Event	Opposition Result	Opposition Result	Rank	Opposition Result	Opposition Result	Opposition Result	Opposition Result	Rank
Pavao Jozić	Individual C7	Shuo (CHN); L 0–3	Salmin (BRA); L 2–3	3	Did not advance				

Women

Athlete	Event	Group stage				Round of 16	Quarterfinals	Semifinals	Final	
Athlete	Event	Opposition Result	Opposition Result	Opposition Result	Rank	Opposition Result	Opposition Result	Opposition Result	Opposition Result	Rank
Helena Dretar Karić	Individual C3	Xue Juan (CHN); L 1–3	Duman (TUR); W 3–1	—	2	Kánová (SVK); L 1–3	Did not advance			
Anđela Mužinić	Individual C3	Sigala (MEX); W 3–0	Brunelli (ITA); W 3–1	Blanco (ARG); W 3–0	1	Bye	Ji-yu (KOR); L 1–3	Did not advance		
Helena Dretar Karić; Anđela Mužinić	Team C1–3	—					Turkey (TUR); W 2–0	South Korea (KOR); L 0–2	Did not advance	3rd place, bronze medalist(s)

== Taekwondo ==
Para taekwondo makes its debut appearance in the Paralympic programme, Ivan Mikulić qualified to compete at the 2020 Summer Paralympics via World Ranking.

Athlete	Event	First round	Quarterfinals	Semifinals	Repechage 1	Repechage 2	Final / BM	
Athlete	Event	Opposition Result	Opposition Result	Opposition Result	Opposition Result	Opposition Result	Opposition Result	Rank
Ivan Mikulić	Men's +75 kg	Bye	Alaoui (MAR); W 28–11	Medell (USA); W 28–9	—		Aziziaghdam (IRI); L 10–12	2nd place, silver medalist(s)

== See also ==
- Croatia at the Paralympics
- Croatia at the 2020 Summer Olympics
