= Table tennis at the 2020 Summer Paralympics – Women's individual – Class 3 =

Table tennis at the XVI Paralympic Games
- Venue: Tokyo Metropolitan Gymnasium
- Dates: 25–29 August
- Competitors: 16 from 12 nations

Medalists
1st place, gold medalist(s)		Xue Juan	China
2nd place, silver medalist(s)		Alena Kánová	Slovakia
3rd place, bronze medalist(s)		Lee Mi-gyu	South Korea
3rd place, bronze medalist(s)		Yoon Ji-yu	South Korea

The Women's individual table tennis – Class 3 tournament at the 2020 Summer Paralympics in Tokyo took place between 25 and 29 August 2021 at Tokyo Metropolitan Gymnasium. Classes 1–5 were for athletes with a physical impairment that affected their legs, and who competed in a sitting position. The lower the number, the greater the impact the impairment was on an athlete's ability to compete.

In the preliminary stage, athletes competed in seven groups of three. Winners and runners-up of each group qualified for the knock-out stage. In this edition of the Games, no bronze medal match was held. Losers of each semifinal were automatically awarded a bronze medal.

== Results ==
All times are local time in UTC+9.

=== Preliminary round ===
The first two matches were played on 25 August, and the third on 26 August.

Qualified for the knock-out stage

==== Group A ====
Seed	Athlete	Matches won	Matches lost	Games won	Games lost	Points diff	Rank
1	Anna-Carin Ahlquist (SWE)	2	0	6	2	+31	1
9	Dararat Asayut (THA)	1	1	4	4	+3	2
12	Nergiz Altıntaş (TUR)	0	2	2	6	–34	3

Nergiz Altıntaş (TUR)	1	11	4	3
Anna-Carin Ahlquist (SWE)	11	7	11	11

Dararat Asayut (THA)	7	5	13	9
Anna-Carin Ahlquist (SWE)	11	11	11	11

Dararat Asayut (THA)	8	11	11	11
Nergiz Altıntaş (TUR)	11	5	4	8

==== Group B ====
Seed	Athlete	Matches won	Matches lost	Games won	Games lost	Points diff	Rank
2	Xue Juan (CHN)	2	0	6	1	+23	1
11	Helena Dretar Karić (CRO)	1	1	4	4	–3	2
10	Hatice Duman (TUR)	0	2	1	6	–20	3

Helena Dretar Karić (CRO)	5	11	12	10
Xue Juan (CHN)	11	13	10	12

Hatice Duman (TUR)	11	5	4
Xue Juan (CHN)	13	11	11

Hatice Duman (TUR)	9	10	11	6
Helena Dretar Karić (CRO)	11	12	6	11

==== Group C ====
Seed	Athlete	Matches won	Matches lost	Games won	Games lost	Points diff	Rank
3	Yoon Ji-yu (KOR)	2	0	6	0	+42	1
7	Alena Kánová (SVK)	1	1	3	3	–6	2
15	Marliane Amaral Santos (BRA)	0	2	0	6	–36	3

Marliane Amaral Santos (BRA)	2	6	1
Yoon Ji-yu (KOR)	11	11	11

Alena Kánová (SVK)	5	3	7
Yoon Ji-yu (KOR)	11	11	11

Alena Kánová (SVK)	14	11	11
Marliane Amaral Santos (BRA)	12	5	7

==== Group D ====
Seed	Athlete	Matches won	Matches lost	Games won	Games lost	Points diff	Rank
6	Lee Mi-gyu (KOR)	2	0	6	1	+20	1
4	Li Qian (CHN)	1	1	3	5	+9	2
14	Sonalben Patel (IND)	0	2	3	6	–29	3

Sonalben Patel (IND)	11	3	17	7	4
Li Qian (CHN)	9	11	15	11	11

Lee Mi-gyu (KOR)	14	15	12
Li Qian (CHN)	12	13	10

Lee Mi-gyu (KOR)	10	11	11	11
Sonalben Patel (IND)	12	5	3	9

==== Group E ====
Seed	Athlete	Matches won	Matches lost	Games won	Games lost	Points diff	Rank
5	Anđela Mužinić (CRO)	3	0	9	1	+56	1
8	Michela Brunelli (ITA)	2	1	7	3	+21	2
13	Edith Sigala (MEX)	1	2	3	7	–27	3
16	Veronica Soledad Blanco (ARG)	0	3	1	9	–50	4

Edith Sigala (MEX)	1	7	2
Anđela Mužinić (CRO)	11	11	11

Michela Brunelli (ITA)	13	9	13	3
Anđela Mužinić (CRO)	15	11	11	11

Michela Brunelli (ITA)	11	11	11
Veronica Soledad (ARG)	6	6	5

Veronica Soledad (ARG)	5	11	6	9
Edith Sigala (MEX)	11	9	11	11

Michela Brunelli (ITA)	11	11	11
Edith Sigala (MEX)	9	3	6

Anđela Mužinić (CRO)	11	11	11
Veronica Soledad (ARG)	6	2	2

=== Knockout stage ===
Round of 16
Alena Kánová (SVK)	9	11	11	11
Helena Dretar Karić (CRO)	11	4	4	6
Dararat Asayut (THA)	5	12	11	11
Li Qian (CHN)	11	10	8	2

Quarter-finals
Anna-Carin Ahlquist (SWE)	4	9	9
Alena Kánová (SVK)	11	11	11
Michela Brunelli (ITA)	10	6	7
Lee Mi-gyu (KOR)	12	11	11
Yoon Ji-yu (KOR)	9	11	13	11
Anđela Mužinić (CRO)	11	4	11	8
Dararat Asayut (THA)	5	2	11	5
Xue Juan (CHN)	11	11	5	11

Semi-finals
Alena Kánová (SVK)	11	12	2	11
Lee Mi-gyu (KOR) (bronze)	7	10	11	9
Yoon Ji-yu (KOR) (bronze)	12	11	9	11	8
Xue Juan (CHN)	14	9	11	6	11

Gold medal match
Alena Kánová (SVK) (silver)	2	6	9
Xue Juan (CHN) (gold)	11	11	11
