= Croatia at the 2012 Summer Paralympics =

- IPC code: CRO
- NPC: Croatian Paralympic Committee
- Website: www.hpo.hr

in London
- Competitors: 25 in 5 sports
- Flag bearer: Darko Kralj
- Medals Ranked 58th: Gold 0 Silver 2 Bronze 3 Total 5

Summer Paralympics appearances (overview)
- 1992; 1996; 2000; 2004; 2008; 2012; 2016; 2020; 2024

Other related appearances
- Yugoslavia (1972–2000)

Croatia competed at the 2012 Summer Paralympics in London, United Kingdom from August 29 to September 9, 2012.

== Medalists ==
Medal	Name	Sport	Event	Date
Silver	Darko Kralj	Athletics	Men's Shot Put F42-44	31 August
Silver	Zoran Talić	Athletics	Long Jump F20	4 September
Bronze	Mihovil Španja	Swimming	Men's 100m Backstroke S7	30 August
Bronze	Mikela Ristoski	Athletics	Women's Long Jump F20	3 September
Bronze	Branimir Budetić	Athletics	Javelin Throw F12-13	5 September

== Athletics ==
Men's Field Events

Athlete	Event	Final	
Athlete	Event	Distance	Rank
Darko Kralj	Shot Put F42-44	14.21 (987 pts)	2nd place, silver medalist(s)
Josip Silvar	Shot Put F42-44	15.07 (812 pts)	7
Josip Silvar	Discus Throw F44	46.70	5
Mladen Tomić	Shot Put F42-44	13.00 (903 pts)	5
Mladen Tomić	Javelin Throw F42	39.07	10
Boro Rađenović	Shot Put F57-58	11.67 (797 pts)	10
Slaven Hudina	Discus Throw F32-34	17.09 (791 pts)	13
Slaven Hudina	Club Throw F31-32/51	23.09 (733 pts)	14
Albin Vidović	Discus Throw F35-36	36.20	7
Miroslav Matić	Discus Throw F51-53	NM	-
Miroslav Matić	Club Throw F31-32/51	24.03 (909 pts)	7
Branimir Budetić	Javelin Throw F12-13	56.78	3rd place, bronze medalist(s)
Zoran Talić	Long Jump F20	7.09	2nd place, silver medalist(s)

Women's Field Events

Athlete	Event	Final	
Athlete	Event	Distance	Rank
Mikela Ristoski	Long Jump F20	5.28	3rd place, bronze medalist(s)
Jelena Vuković	Shot Put F42-44	7.85 (683 pts)	5
Milka Milinković	Shot Put F54-56	6.46 (647 pts)	15
Milka Milinković	Javelin Throw F54-56	14.50	10
Marija Iveković-Meštrović	Discus Throw F11-12	33.77 (776 pts)	9
Marija Vidaček	Javelin Throw F12-13	27.05	7

== Cycling ==
=== Road ===
Men

Athlete	Event	Time	Rank
Gracijano Turčinović	Road Race H2	LAP	
Gracijano Turčinović	Time Trial H2	35:23.81	13

Mixed

Athlete	Event	Time	Rank
Mario Alilović	Road Race T1-2	1:07:44	12
Mario Alilović	Time Trial T1-2	17:18.53	14

== Shooting ==
Athlete	Event	Qualification		Final	
Athlete	Event	Score	Rank	Score	Rank
Ivica Bratanović	Mixed 10m Air Rifle Prone SH2	597	22	did not advance	
Ivica Bratanović	Mixed 10m Air Rifle Standing SH2	592	22	did not advance	
Stanko Piljak	Mixed 10m Air Rifle Prone SH2	589	30	did not advance	
Stanko Piljak	Mixed 10m Air Rifle Standing SH2	588	25	did not advance	

== Swimming ==
Men

Athletes	Event	Heat		Final	
Athletes	Event	Time	Rank	Time	Rank
Matija Grebenić	100m freestyle S5	1:30.23	10	did not advance	
Matija Grebenić	200m freestyle S5	3:06.43	8 Q	3:05.15	7
Matija Grebenić	50m backstroke S5	49.36	15	did not advance	
Matija Grebenić	50m butterfly S5	52.12	18	did not advance	
Kristijan Vincetić	100m freestyle S9	1:00.86	18	did not advance	
Kristijan Vincetić	400m freestyle S9	4:37.39	10	did not advance	
Kristijan Vincetić	100m butterfly S9	1:03.25	10	did not advance	
Mihovil Španja	400m freestyle S7	4:52.99	4 Q	4:52.22	5
Mihovil Španja	100m backstroke S7	1:13.36	3 Q	1:12.53	3rd place, bronze medalist(s)
Mihovil Španja	100m breaststroke SB6	1:28.96	5 Q	1:28.45	5
Mihovil Španja	200m individual medley SM7	2:40.14	3 Q	2:41.52	5

== Table tennis ==
Men

Athlete	Event	Group Stage			Quarterfinals	Semifinals	Final	
Athlete	Event	Opposition Result	Opposition Result	Rank	Opposition Result	Opposition Result	Opposition Result	Rank
Tomislav Špalj	Individual C4	Burkhardt (GER); W 3-2	Thomas (FRA); L 2-3	2	did not advance			
Vjekoslav Gregorović	Individual C6	Choy (HKG); L 0-3	Rau (GER); L 2-3	3	did not advance			

Women

Athlete	Event	Group Stage			Quarterfinals	Semifinals	Final	
Athlete	Event	Opposition Result	Opposition Result	Rank	Opposition Result	Opposition Result	Opposition Result	Rank
Helena Dretar Karić	Individual C3	Cho (KOR); W 3-1	Kanova (SVK); L 0-3	2	did not advance			
Anđela Mužinić	Individual C3	Fontaine (USA); W 3-2	Jung (KOR); L 0-3	2	did not advance			
Helena Dretar Karić; Anđela Mužinić	Team C1-3	—N/a			South Korea; L 1-3	did not advance		

== See also ==
- Croatia at the 2012 Summer Olympics
