= Table tennis at the 2012 Summer Paralympics – Women's team – Class 1–3 =

Table tennis Women's team C1-3 at the XIV Paralympic Games
- Venue: ExCeL Exhibition Centre
- Dates: September 5 - September 7, 2016
- Competitors: 10 from 10 nations

Medalists
1st place, gold medalist(s)		Liu Jing; Li Qian	China
2nd place, silver medalist(s)		Cho Kyoung Hee; Choi Hyun Ja; Jung Sang Sook	South Korea
3rd place, bronze medalist(s)		Jane Campbell; Sara Head	Great Britain

The Women's team table tennis - Class 1-3 tournament at the 2012 Summer Paralympics in London took place from 5 September to 7 September 2012 at ExCeL Exhibition Centre. Classes 1-3 were for athletes with a physical impairment that affects their legs, and who compete in a sitting position. The lower the number, the greater the impact the impairment was on an athlete's ability to compete.

== Bracket ==
First round
1
16
United States (USA)	1
France (FRA)	3
5
12
13
4
3
14
11
6
Turkey (TUR)	3
Thailand (THA)	1
15
2

Quarter finals
China (CHN)	3
France (FRA)	1
Ireland (IRL)	0
Italy (ITA)	3
South Korea (KOR)	3
Croatia (CRO)	1
Turkey (TUR)	2
Great Britain (GBR)	3

Semifinals
China (CHN)	3
Italy (ITA)	0
South Korea (KOR)	3
Great Britain (GBR)	0

Gold Medal
China (CHN)	3
South Korea (KOR)	0
Bronze Medal
Italy (ITA)	2
Great Britain (GBR)	3

== Results ==
=== First round ===
5 September 2012; 16:30	United States	1–3	France

Report	Individual matches
Tara Profitt	0–3	Fanny Bertrand	1–11, 3–11, 3–11
Pamela Fontaine	3–0	Marie-Christine Fillou	11–7, 11–9, 11–8
Pamela Fontaine	0–3	Fanny Bertrand	8–11, 7–11, 11–13
Tara Profitt	0–3	Marie-Christine Fillou	5–11, 3–11, 5–11

5 September 2012; 16:30	Turkey	3–1	Thailand

Report	Individual matches
Hatice Duman	0–3	P Wararitdamrongkul	7–11, 9–11, 6–11
Nergiz Altintas	3–0	Wachirapond Maenpuak	11–5, 11–7, 11–4
Nergiz Altintas	3–2	P Wararitdamrongkul	8–11, 11–9, 10–12, 11–2, 11–7
Hatice Duman	3–1	Wachirapond Maenpuak	10–12, 11–5, 12–10, 11–9

=== Quarter-finals ===
6 September 2012; 11:30	China	3–1	France

Report	Individual matches
Li Qian	3–0	Marie-Christine Fillou	11–3, 11–2, 11–6
Liu Jing	1–3	Fanny Bertrand	7–11, 11–8, 6–11, 12–14
Li Qian	3–2	Fanny Bertrand	9–11, 11–9, 11–4, 9–11, 11–4
Liu Jing	3–1	Marie-Christine Fillou	11–8, 11–8, 5–11, 11–6

6 September 2012; 11:30	Ireland	0–3	Italy

Report	Individual matches
Eimear Breathnach	0–3	Michela Brunelli	6–11, 3–11, 6–11
Rena McCarron Rooney	1–3	Pamela Pezzutto	11–8, 4–11, 7–11, 2–11
Rena McCarron Rooney	0–3	Michela Brunelli	4–11, 4–11, 6–11

6 September 2012; 11:30	South Korea	3–1	Croatia

Report	Individual matches
Jung Sang Sook	3–1	Andela Muzinic	9–11, 11–9, 11–7, 12–10
Cho Kyoung Hee	1–3	Helena Dretar Karic	10–12, 5–11, 14–12, 10–12
Jung Sang Sook	3–1	Helena Dretar Karic	9–11, 11–9, 11–8, 11–8
Cho Kyoung Hee	3–1	Andela Muzinic	9–11, 11–9, 11–9, 11–5

6 September 2012; 11:30	Turkey	2–3	Great Britain

Report	Individual matches
Nergiz Altintas	3–1	Jane Campbell	11–6, 11–4, 9–11, 12–10
Hatice Duman	3–1	Sara Head	9–11, 12–10, 12–10, 11–7
Nergiz Altintas	0–3	Sara Head	7–11, 8–11, 7–11
Hatice Duman	2–3	Jane Campbell	8–11, 11–8, 11–9, 8–11, 10–12
Nergiz Altintas / Hatice Duman	0–3	Jane Campbell / Sara Head	4–11, 10–12, 8–11

=== Semifinals ===
6 September 2012; 19:00	China	3–0	Italy

Report	Individual matches
Li Qian	3–0	Clara Podda	11–3, 11–2, 11–5
Liu Jing	3–1	Michela Brunelli	11–8, 9–11, 11–7, 11–9
Li Qian	3–1	Michela Brunelli	11–3, 9–11, 12–10, 11–5

6 September 2012; 19:00	South Korea	3–0	Great Britain

Report	Individual matches
Cho Kyoung Hee	3–1	Sara Head	11–9, 11–8, 7–11, 13–11
Jung Sang Sook	3–0	Jane Campbell	11–5, 11–1, 11–7
Jung Sang Sook	3–1	Sara Head	11–6, 6–11, 11–9, 16–14

=== Finals ===
Gold medal match

7 September 2012; 17:00	China	3–0	South Korea

Report	Individual matches
Liu Jing	3–0	Jung Sang Sook	11–7, 6–11, 12–10, 8–11, 11–5
Li Qian	3–0	Choi Hyun Ja	11–4, 11–4, 11–9
Li Qian	3–1	Jung Sang Sook	13–15, 11–4, 11–3, 13–11

Third place match

7 September 2012; 17:00	Italy	2–3	Great Britain

Report	Individual matches
Michela Brunelli	3–1	Jane Campbell	12–10, 8–11, 11–9, 11–3
Pamela Pezzutto	3–1	Sarah Head	11–7, 17–15, 9–11, 12–10
Michela Brunelli	1–3	Sarah Head	16–14, 9–11, 8–11, 7–11
Pamela Pezzutto	0–3	Jane Campbell	7–11, 8–11, 7–11
Pamela Pezzutto / Clara Podda	2–3	Jane Campbell / Sarah Head	6–11, 11–7, 11–7, 3–11, 4–11
