= Sara Head =

British table tennis player

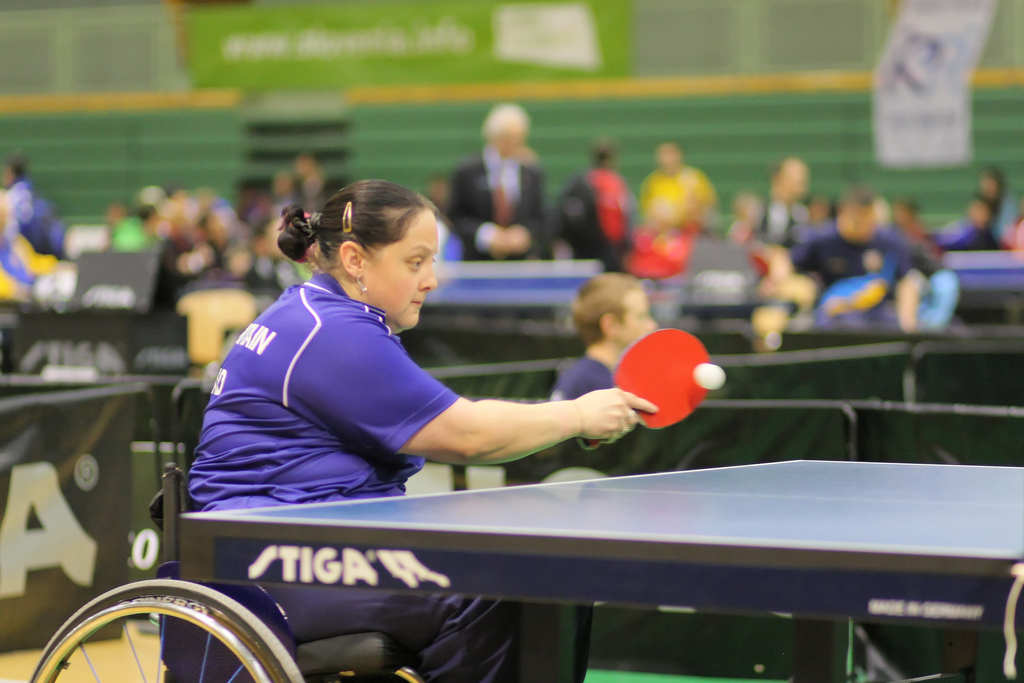
- Head in 2012

Personal information
- Full name: Sara Head
- Nationality: British
- Born: 12 April 1980 (age 46) Cardiff, Wales

Sport
- Country: Great Britain
- Sport: Table tennis
- Event: Class 3 singles / doubles

Achievements and titles
- Paralympic finals: 2012
Medal record
Table tennis
Representing Great Britain
Paralympic Games
Bronze medal – third place	2012 London	Team class 1–3
World Championships
Gold medal – first place	2010 Gwangju	Team class 1–3

Sara Head (born 12 April 1980) is a Welsh Paralympic table tennis player. Head has represented Wales at two Commonwealth Games and was selected for the 2012 Paralympic Games, where she took the bronze medal in the women's team class 1–3 event with team-mate Jane Campbell.

== Career history ==
Head was born in Cardiff, Wales, in 1980 and grew up in Beddau near Pontypridd. She was educated at Bryn Celynnog Comprehensive School. At the age of 15 Head became paraplegic after contracting a virus. She initially took up wheelchair basketball, but switched to table tennis after her then boyfriend introduced her to the sport around 2000. Head's ability at the sport brought her to the attention of Disability Sport Wales who encouraged her to keep training at the sport and also introduced her to Paralympian Jim Munkley. By 2002, under the coaching of Munkley, she had shown enough talent to be selected for the Wales team at the 2002 Commonwealth Games in Manchester.

Although Head did not medal in Manchester, by 2004 she had won the Hungarian Open and two years later she again represented Wales at the 2006 Commonwealth Games. By 2009 she had teamed up with Jane Campbell and along with Leanne Stephen the three women took the women's team class 3 bronze at the 2009 European Championships in Genoa, Italy. Head and Campbell were joined by Cathy Mitton for the 2010 World Para Table Tennis Championships in Gwangju, Korea, and on this occasion they took the gold medal in the women's team class 1–3. Head and Campbell took another gold medal in the women's team class 3 event at the 2011 European Championships in Croatia and the following year the two won silver at the China Open. In 2012 Head picked up two bronze medals at the Lignano Open in Italy, in the team and the individual class 3 women's events.

After the disappointment of failing to qualify for the 2008 Paralympics in Beijing, Head made the Great Britain team for the 2012 Paralympic Games in London. In the individual class 3 event, Head came from 2–1 down to beat Slovenia's Mateja Pintar to take her to the semi-finals. There she faced Doris Mader of Austria, who proved too big a challenge, beating Head 3–0. Although missing out on the final, it set up a bronze medal decider with Alena Kanova of Slovakia, and despite taking the first game, Head lost 3–1 to finish just outside the medal table in fourth. In the women's class 1–3 team event at London, Head and Campbell faced the Turkish team made up of pairing Nergiz Altintas and Hatice Duman. Both Head and Campbell lost their opening individual matches, but then turned that result around when they switched opponents to level the game 2–2. The British team won the deciding doubles set to win the match 3–2 and advanced to the semi-finals. Their semi-final opponents, Kyoung Hee Cho and Sang Sook Jung of South Korea were too strong, winning in a 3–0 white-wash, with Head only taking two games from her opponents. As losing semi-finalists, Head and Campbell were placed into the bronze medal decider, against Italy's Michela Brunelli, Pamela Pezzutto and Clara Podda. Just like their first round match against Turkey, Head and Campbell lost both opening matches before winning their next two individual matches and then came from 2–1 down in the doubles match to win 3–2 and took the bronze medal.
