= Jane Campbell (table tennis) =

British para table tennis player

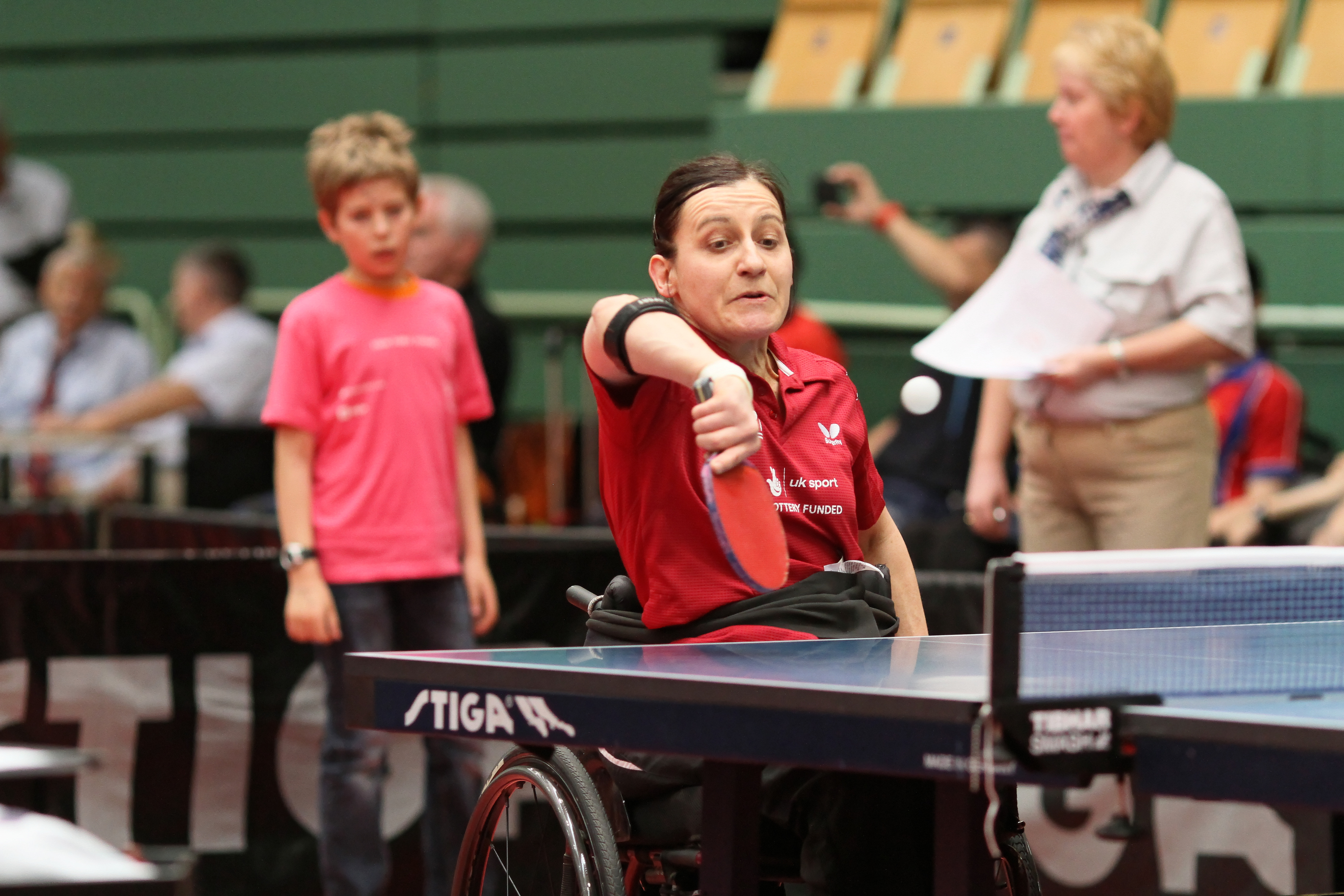

Personal information
- Full name: Jane Campbell
- Nationality: British
- Born: 18 August 1968 (age 57) Barnsley, West Riding of Yorkshire, England

Sport
- Country: Great Britain
- Sport: Table tennis
- Event: Class 3 singles / doubles

Achievements and titles
- Paralympic finals: 2012
Medal record
Athletics
Representing Great Britain
Paralympic Games
Bronze medal – third place	2012 London	Team class 1–3

Jane Campbell (born 18 June 1968) is an English Paralympic table tennis player. Campbell was selected for the 2012 Paralympic Games, where she took the bronze medal in the women's team class 1–3 event with team-mate Sara Head.

== Career history ==
Campbell was born in Barnsley. She has used a wheelchair since 1983 when she broke her back in a car accident. Campbell started playing table tennis socially in 2000 and shortly afterwards decided one of her aims was to play the game at Paralympic level. After the disappointment of failing to qualify for the 2008 Paralympics in Beijing, Campbell made the Great Britain team for the 2012 Paralympic Games in London. In the women's class 1–3 team event at London, Campbell and Head faced the Turkish team made up of pairing Nergiz Altintas and Hatice Duman. They both lost their opening individual matches, but then turned that result around when they switched opponents to level the game 2–2. The British team won the deciding doubles set to win the match 3–2 and take them into the semi-finals. Their semi-final opponents, Kyoung Hee Cho and Sang Sook Jung of South Korea were too strong, winning in a 3–0 white-wash, with Head only taking two games from her opponents. As losing semi-finalists, they were placed into the bronze medal decider, against Italy's Michela Brunelli, Pamela Pezzutto and Clara Podda. As in their first round match against Turkey, Campbell and Head lost both opening matches before winning their next two individual matches and then game from 2–1 down in the doubles match to win 3–2 and take the bronze medal.
