= Mužinić =

Mužinić is a Serbo-Croatian surname. Notable people with the surname include:

- Anđela Mužinić (born 1992), Croatian table tennis player
- Dražen Mužinić (born 1953), Croatian footballer
