= Doris Mader =

Austrian para table tennis player

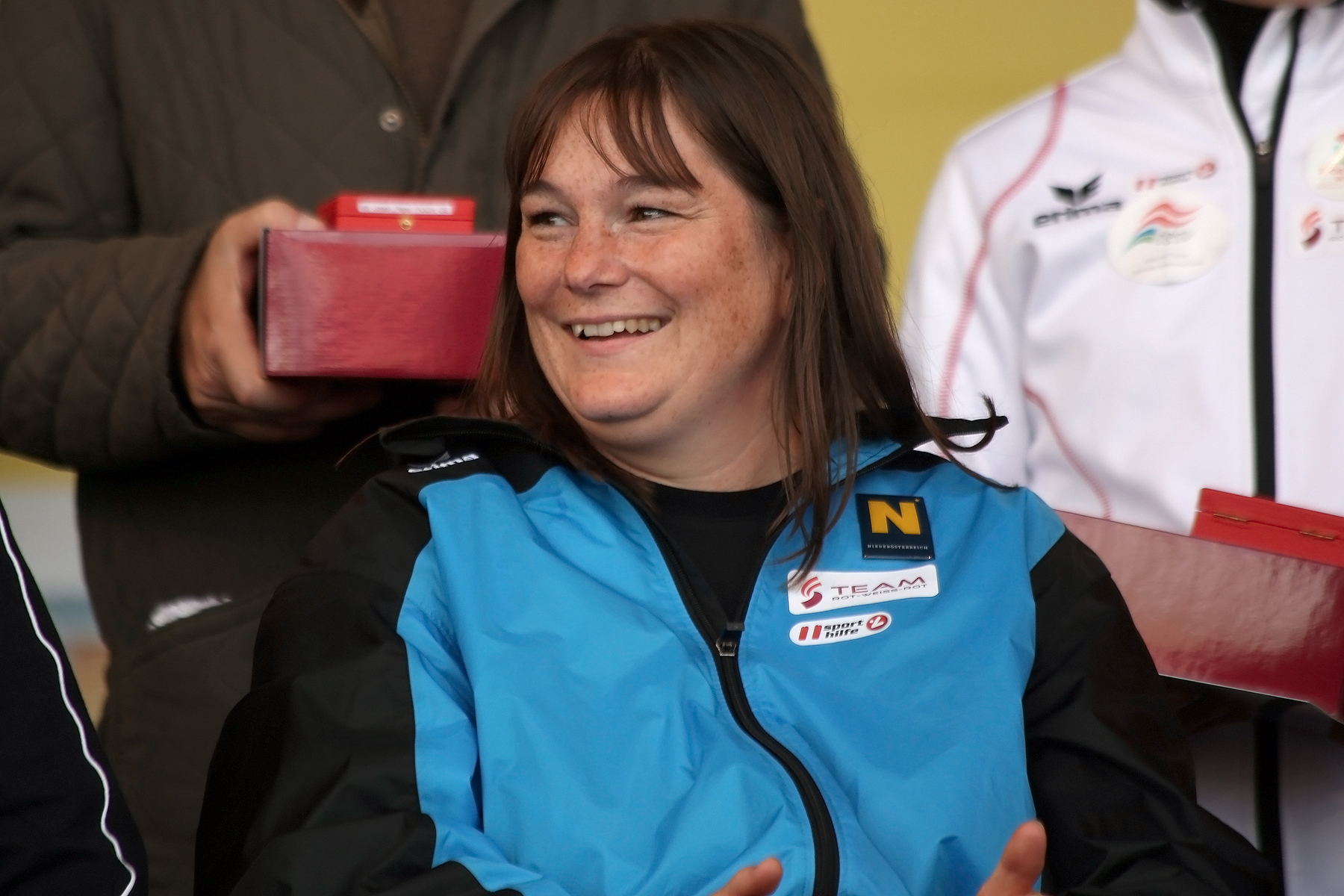
- Doris Mader in 2013

Personal information
- National team: Austria
- Born: 3 February 1976 (age 50)

Sport
- Country: Austria
- Sport: Table tennis
- Disability class: Class 3
Medal record
Women's table tennis
Representing Austria
Paralympic Games
Silver medal – second place	2012 London	Individual class 3

Doris Mader (born 3 February 1976) is an Austrian table tennis player who has competed for her country at the national level. She won the silver medal in the women's individual class 3 table tennis at the 2012 Summer Paralympics.

== Career ==
Doris Mader started playing table tennis when she was seven, in part due to her father who was a table tennis instructor. In 2002, while studying veterinary medicine, she lost motion in her legs. This was caused by a 2.5 centimetres (0.98 in) tumour on her spine. Following surgery, she underwent rehabilitation at the Weißer Hof facility in Klosterneuburg.

Following her disability, she took up wheelchair table tennis, competing for Austria. She met Andreas Vevera while at Weißer Hof, and the two trained together in the sport. Both competed at the 2008 Summer Paralympics in Beijing, China, where Vevera won the gold medal in the men's individual class 1, while Mader finished fifth in women's individual class 3. Those roles were reversed at the 2012 Games in London, England, where Vevera was eliminated early. He then coached Mader as she won the silver medal in her class, following defeat by Sweden's Anna-Carin Ahlquist in the final.

Mader competed again at the 2016 Summer Paralympics in Rio de Janeiro, Brazil, but without Vevera for the first time. However, Mader failed to win any medals after being eliminated from the tournament in the round of 16.
