= Shooting at the 2012 Summer Paralympics – Mixed 10 metre air rifle standing SH2 =

Mixed 10 metre air rifle standing SH2 at the XIV Paralympic Games
- Venue: Royal Artillery Barracks
- Dates: 2 September 2012
- Competitors: 28 from 16 nations

Medalists
1st place, gold medalist(s)		Kang Ju-young	South Korea
2nd place, silver medalist(s)		Franček Gorazd Tiršek	Slovenia
3rd place, bronze medalist(s)		Michael Johnson	New Zealand

The Mixed 10 metre air rifle standing SH2 event at the 2012 Summer Paralympics took place on 2 September at the Royal Artillery Barracks in Woolwich.

The event consisted of two rounds: a qualifier and a final. In the qualifier, each shooter fired 60 shots with an air rifle at 10 metres distance from the "standing" (interpreted to include seated in wheelchairs) position, using a spring-mounted stand to replicate the movement of the front hand. Scores for each shot were in increments of 1, with a maximum score of 10.

The top 8 shooters in the qualifying round moved on to the final round. There, they fired an additional 10 shots. These shots scored in increments of .1, with a maximum score of 10.9. The total score from all 70 shots were used to determine the final ranking.

== Qualification round ==
Rank	Athlete	Country	G	1	2	3	4	5	6	Total	Shoot-off	Notes
1=	Tanguy de la Forest	France	M	100	100	100	100	100	100	600-58x		Q EWR
1=	Michael Johnson	New Zealand	M	100	100	100	100	100	100	600-58x		Q EWR
3	Kang Ju-young	South Korea	M	100	100	100	100	100	100	600-54x		Q EWR
4	Sinisa Vidić	Serbia	M	100	100	100	99	100	100	599-58x		Q
5	Franček Gorazd Tiršek	Slovenia	M	100	100	100	99	100	100	599-57x		Q
6	Raphael Voltz	France	M	100	100	99	99	100	100	598-57x	52.7	Q
7	Jason Maroney	Australia	M	100	98	100	100	100	100	598-57x	52.6	Q
8	Jeon Young-jun	South Korea	M	100	99	100	100	100	99	598-53x	52.2	Q
9	Bradley Mark	Australia	M	100	100	99	99	100	100	598-56x	52.1	
10	Lee Ji-seok	South Korea	M	100	100	98	100	100	100	598-55x	52.0	
11	Vasyl Kovalchuk	Ukraine	M	100	99	100	100	100	99	598-55x	51.9	
12	Yuan Hongxiang	China	M	99	100	100	100	99	100	598-54x	51.0	
13	Evangelos Kakosaios	Greece	M	99	100	99	100	99	100	597-50x		
14	Sergey Nochevnoy	Russia	M	100	100	100	100	99	98	597-49x		
15=	Richard Davies	Great Britain	M	99	99	99	100	99	100	596-52x		
15=	Juan Antonio Saavedra Reinaldo	Spain	M	98	99	100	99	100	100	596-52x		
17	Damjan Pavlin	Slovenia	M	100	100	99	99	99	99	596-51x		
18	Cedric Rio	France	M	99	99	100	99	99	100	596-49x		
19	Dragan Ristic	Serbia	M	99	100	99	98	98	100	594-50x		
20	Adam Fontain	Great Britain	M	98	99	100	99	98	99	593-44x		
21	Ryan Cockbill	Great Britain	M	99	97	99	99	99	99	592-49x		
22	Ivica Bratanovic	Croatia	M	100	99	100	97	99	97	592-41x		
23	Theodora Moutsiou	Greece	W	99	100	98	98	97	99	591-43x		
24	Doug Blessin	Canada	M	99	96	98	98	99	100	590-41x		
25	Stanko Piljak	Croatia	M	97	100	97	98	99	97	588-36x		
26	Sonja Jennie Tobiassen	Norway	W	97	96	98	99	98	98	586-39x		
27	Luke Cain	Australia	M	98	96	100	100	96	96	586-37x		
28	Massimo Dalla Casa	Italy	M	99	99	98	99	94	95	584-36x		

Q = Qualified for final. EWR = Equal World Record.

== Final ==
All the qualifiers were male.

Rank	Athlete	Country	Qual	1	2	3	4	5	6	7	8	9	10	Final	Total	Shoot-off	Notes
1st place, gold medalist(s)	Kang Ju-young	South Korea	600	10.8	10.5	10.9	10.2	10.6	10.6	10.8	10.6	10.1	10.4	105.5	705.5		FPR
2nd place, silver medalist(s)	Franček Gorazd Tiršek	Slovenia	599	10.7	10.7	10.5	10.8	10.5	10.1	10.6	10.4	10.6	10.8	105.7	704.7	10.8	
3rd place, bronze medalist(s)	Michael Johnson	New Zealand	600	10.7	10.7	10.5	10.1	10.8	10.6	9.8	10.6	10.4	10.5	104.7	704.7	10.3	
4	Sinisa Vidić	Serbia	599	10.2	10.7	10.6	10.9	10.7	10.5	10.9	10.5	9.8	10.7	105.5	704.5		
5	Tanguy de la Forest	France	600	10.4	10.1	10.2	10.7	10.4	10.5	10.1	10.5	10.8	10.1	103.8	703.8		
6	Jeon Young-jun	South Korea	598	10.5	10.3	10.6	10.7	10.3	10.5	10.5	10.7	10.4	10.4	104.9	702.9		
7	Jason Maroney	Australia	598	10.9	10.5	10.6	10.8	10.1	10.8	10.0	10.3	10.4	10.2	104.6	702.6		
8	Raphael Voltz	France	598	10.9	10.2	10.8	10.1	10.1	10.3	10.5	10.6	10.5	10.5	104.5	702.5		

FPR = Final Paralympic record.
