= Table tennis at the 2016 Summer Paralympics – Women's team – Class 1–3 =

Table tennis at the XV Paralympic Games
- Venue: Riocentro Pavilion 3
- Dates: 14–16 September 2016
- Competitors: 6 teams from 6 nations

Medalists
1st place, gold medalist(s)		Li Qian; Liu Jing; Xue Juan	China
2nd place, silver medalist(s)		Helena Dretar Karić; Anđela Mužinić	Croatia
3rd place, bronze medalist(s)		Seo Su-yeon; Yoon Ji-yu; Lee Mi-gyu	South Korea

The Women's team table tennis – 1–3 tournament at the 2016 Summer Paralympics in Rio de Janeiro took place during 14–16 September 2016 at Riocentro Pavilion 3. Classes 1–5 were for athletes with a physical impairment that affected their legs, and who competed in a sitting position. The lower the number, the greater the impact the impairment was on an athlete's ability to compete.

== Results ==
All times are local time in UTC-3.

=== Competition bracket ===
Quarter-finals
5	Great Britain (GBR)	3	1	1
3	Italy (ITA)	0	3	3
4	Croatia (CRO)	3	3
6	Thailand (THA)	1	0

Semi-finals
1	China (CHN)	3	3
3	Italy (ITA)	0	0
4	Croatia (CRO)	3	3
2	South Korea (KOR)	2	2

Finals
1	China (CHN)	3	3
4	Croatia (CRO)	0	1
Bronze medal match
3	Italy (ITA)	3	0	2
2	South Korea (KOR)	2	3	3
