= Table tennis at the 2012 Summer Paralympics – Men's individual – Class 6 =

Table tennis Men's C6 at the XIV Paralympic Games
- Venue: ExCeL Exhibition Centre
- Dates: August 30-September 2, 2012
- Competitors: 16 from 14 nations

Medalists
| 1st place, gold medalist(s) | | Rungroj Thainiyom | Thailand |
| 2nd place, silver medalist(s) | | Álvaro Valera | Spain |
| 3rd place, bronze medalist(s) | | Peter Rosenmeier | Denmark |

The Men's individual table tennis - Class 6 tournament at the 2012 Summer Paralympics in London took place from 30 August to 2 September 2012 at ExCeL Exhibition Centre. Classes 6–10 are for athletes with a physical impairment who compete from a standing position; the lower the number, the greater the impact the impairment has on an athlete’s ability to compete.

In the preliminary stage, athletes competed in four groups of three. Winners of each group qualified for the quarter-finals, joined by four seeded players.

== Seeds ==
All seeds received a bye into the quarter-finals.

1. Alvaro Valera (ESP)
2. Peter Rosenmeier (DEN)
3. Rungroj Thainiyom (THA)
4. Bastien Grundeler (FRA)

== Results ==
All times are local (BST/UTC+1)

=== Finals ===
Quarterfinals: 1 Sep 11:45
1 | Álvaro Valera (ESP) | 11 | 16 | 11
Chen Chao (CHN) | 3 | 14 | 4
Raimondo Alecci (ITA) | 5 | 3 | 9
4 | Bastien Grundeler (FRA) | 11 | 11 | 11
3 | Rungroj Thainiyom (THA) | 11 | 11 | 13
Alexander Esaulov (RUS) | 6 | 7 | 11
Choy Hing Lam (HKG) | 2 | 3 | 7
2 | Peter Rosenmeier (DEN) | 11 | 11 | 11

Semifinals: 1 Sep 18:15
1 | Álvaro Valera (ESP) | 11 | 11 | 11
4 | Bastien Grundeler (FRA) | 3 | 9 | 4
3 | Rungroj Thainiyom (THA) | 11 | 5 | 7 | 11 | 11
2 | Peter Rosenmeier (DEN) | 9 | 11 | 11 | 9 | 6

Final: 2 Sep 11:00
1 | Álvaro Valera (ESP) | 8 | 8 | 10
3 | Rungroj Thainiyom (THA) | 11 | 11 | 12
Third place
4 | Bastien Grundeler (FRA) | 9 | 8 | 13 | 5
2 | Peter Rosenmeier (DEN) | 11 | 11 | 11 | 11

=== Preliminary round ===
| Qualified for the quarter-finals |

==== Group A ====
| Athlete | Won | Lost | Games diff | Points diff |
|---|---|---|---|---|
| Raimondo Alecci (ITA) | 1 | 1 | +1 | +4 |
| Thomasz Kusiak (GER) | 1 | 1 | 0 | +3 |
| David Wetherill (GBR) | 1 | 1 | -1 | -7 |

30 August, 11:40

| David Wetherill (GBR) | 7 | 4 | 11 | 11 | 11 |
| Raimondo Alecci (ITA) | 11 | 11 | 8 | 4 | 9 |

30 August, 19:20

| Raimondo Alecci (ITA) | 5 | 11 | 11 | 11 |
| Thomasz Kusiak (GER) | 11 | 7 | 7 | 8 |

31 August, 18:00

| David Wetherill (GBR) | 11 | 5 | 23 | 7 |
| Thomasz Kusiak (GER) | 7 | 11 | 25 | 11 |

==== Group B ====
| Athlete | Won | Lost | Games diff | Points diff |
|---|---|---|---|---|
| Chen Chao (CHN) | 2 | 0 | +6 | +43 |
| Thomas Fernandez (FRA) | 1 | 1 | -2 | -16 |
| Junki Itai (JPN) | 0 | 2 | -4 | -27 |

30 August, 11:40

| Thomas Fernandez (FRA) | 6 | 11 | 9 | 12 | 11 |
| Junki Itai (JPN) | 11 | 7 | 11 | 10 | 7 |

30 August, 19:20

| Junki Itai (JPN) | 2 | 4 | 3 |
| Chen Chao (CHN) | 11 | 11 | 11 |

31 August, 18:00

| Thomas Fernandez (FRA) | 3 | 7 | 4 |
| Chen Chao (CHN) | 11 | 11 | 11 |

==== Group C ====
| Athlete | Won | Lost | Games diff | Points diff |
|---|---|---|---|---|
| Alexander Esaulov (RUS) | 2 | 0 | +5 | +31 |
| Park Hong Kyu (KOR) | 1 | 1 | +1 | +8 |
| Carlo Michell (BRA) | 0 | 2 | -6 | -39 |

30 August, 11:40

| Alexander Esaulov (RUS) | 11 | 11 | 11 |
| Carlo Michell (BRA) | 4 | 3 | 2 |

30 August, 20:00

| Carlo Michell (BRA) | 5 | 4 | 9 |
| Park Hong Kyu (KOR) | 11 | 11 | 11 |

31 August, 18:00

| Alexander Esaulov (RUS) | 9 | 11 | 12 | 11 |
| Park Hong Kyu (KOR) | 11 | 9 | 10 | 6 |

==== Group D ====
| Athlete | Won | Lost | Games diff | Points diff |
|---|---|---|---|---|
| Choy Hing Lam (HKG) | 2 | 0 | +5 | +19 |
| Thomas Rau (GER) | 1 | 1 | -1 | -7 |
| Vjekoslav Gregorovic (CRO) | 0 | 2 | -4 | -12 |

30 August, 11:40

| Thomas Rau (GER) | 8 | 11 | 6 | 6 |
| Choy Hing Lam (HKG) | 11 | 7 | 11 | 11 |

30 August, 20:00

| Choy Hing Lam (HKG) | 12 | 11 | 11 |
| Vjekoslav Gregorovic (CRO) | 10 | 7 | 7 |

31 August, 18:00

| Thomas Rau (GER) | 10 | 20 | 11 | 10 | 14 |
| Vjekoslav Gregorovic (CRO) | 12 | 18 | 9 | 12 | 12 |
