= Anna-Carin Ahlquist =

Swedish Paralympic table tennis player

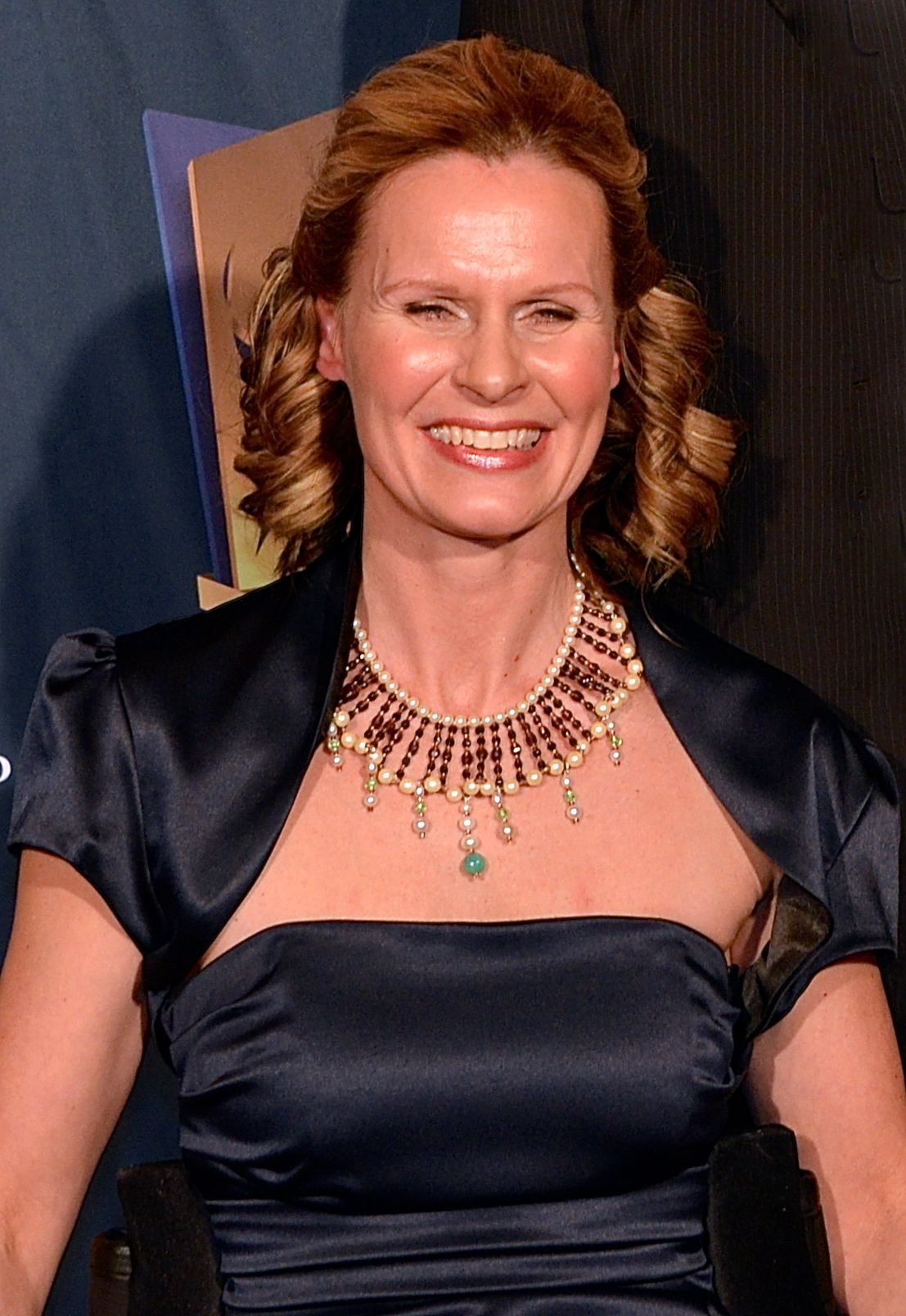

Personal information
- Born: 5 June 1972 (age 54)

Sport
- Country: Sweden
- Sport: Table tennis
- Events: Individual Class 3; Team Class 4–5
Medal record
Representing Sweden
Paralympic Games
Gold medal – first place	2012 London	Women's singles C3
Silver medal – second place	2012 London	Women's team C4–5
Silver medal – second place	2020 Tokyo	Women's team C4–5
Bronze medal – third place	2016 Rio de Janeiro	Women's singles C3

Anna-Carin Ahlquist (born 5 June 1972) is a Swedish in wheelchair table tennis player and paralympic champion. Ahlquist represented Sweden at the 2008, 2012, 2016 Summer Paralympics, and 2020 Summer Paralympics.

She won a gold medal in single and a silver medal in team at the 2012 Summer Paralympics. She also won a bronze medal in single at the 2016 Summer Paralympics behind double gold medallist Xue Juan and Li Qian.

She won a silver medal in Team C4–5, at the 2020 Summer Paralympics.
