= Yoon Ji-yu =

South Korean para table tennis player

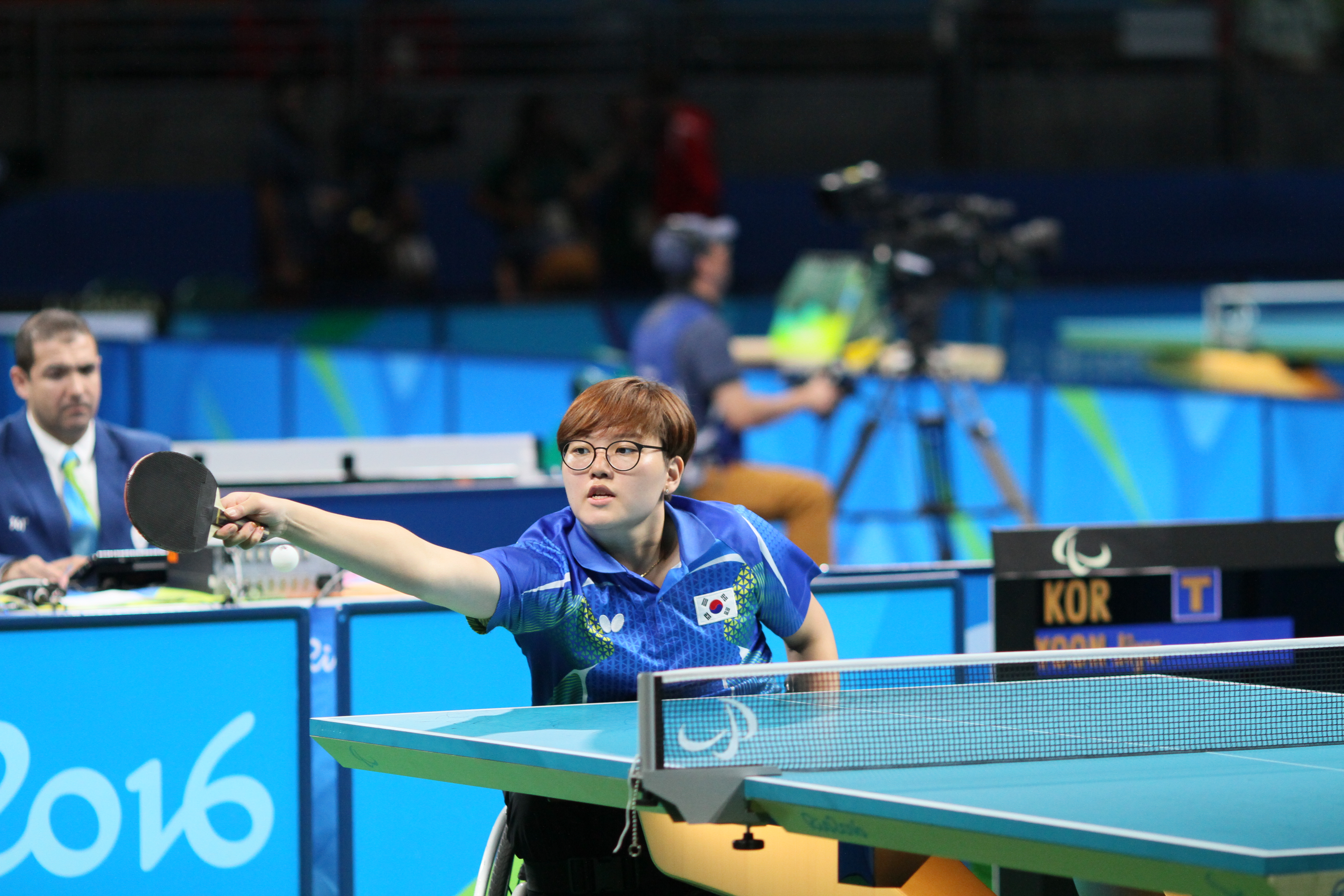
- Yoon at the 2016 Summer Paralympics

Personal information
- Born: 28 December 2000 (age 25) Yongin, Gyeonggi, South Korea
- Height: 165 cm (5 ft 5 in)
- Weight: 65 kg (143 lb)

Sport
- Sport: Table tennis
- Playing style: Right-handed shakehand grip
- Disability class: 3
- Highest ranking: 2 (October 2019)
- Current ranking: 3 (February 2020)
Medal record
Women's para table tennis
Representing South Korea
Paralympic Games
Bronze medal – third place	2016 Rio de Janeiro	Teams C1–3
Silver medal – second place	2024 Paris	Singles C3
Silver medal – second place	2024 Paris	Doubles WD5
Asian Championships
Silver medal – second place	2017 Beijing	Teams C1–3
Bronze medal – third place	2017 Beijing	Singles C1–3
Bronze medal – third place	2019 Taichung	Singles C3
Asian Para Games
Gold medal – first place	2022 Hangzhou	Singles C3

Yoon Ji-yu (Korean: 윤지유; RR: Yun Jiyu, born 28 December 2000) is a South Korean para table tennis player. She won a bronze medal at the 2016 Summer Paralympics, before her 16th birthday.

== Personal life ==
She became paralyzed when she was 28 months old. Her paralysis was caused by spinal cord infarction. She has a twin sibling.
