= Choi Hyun-ja =

South Korean para table tennis player (born 1959)

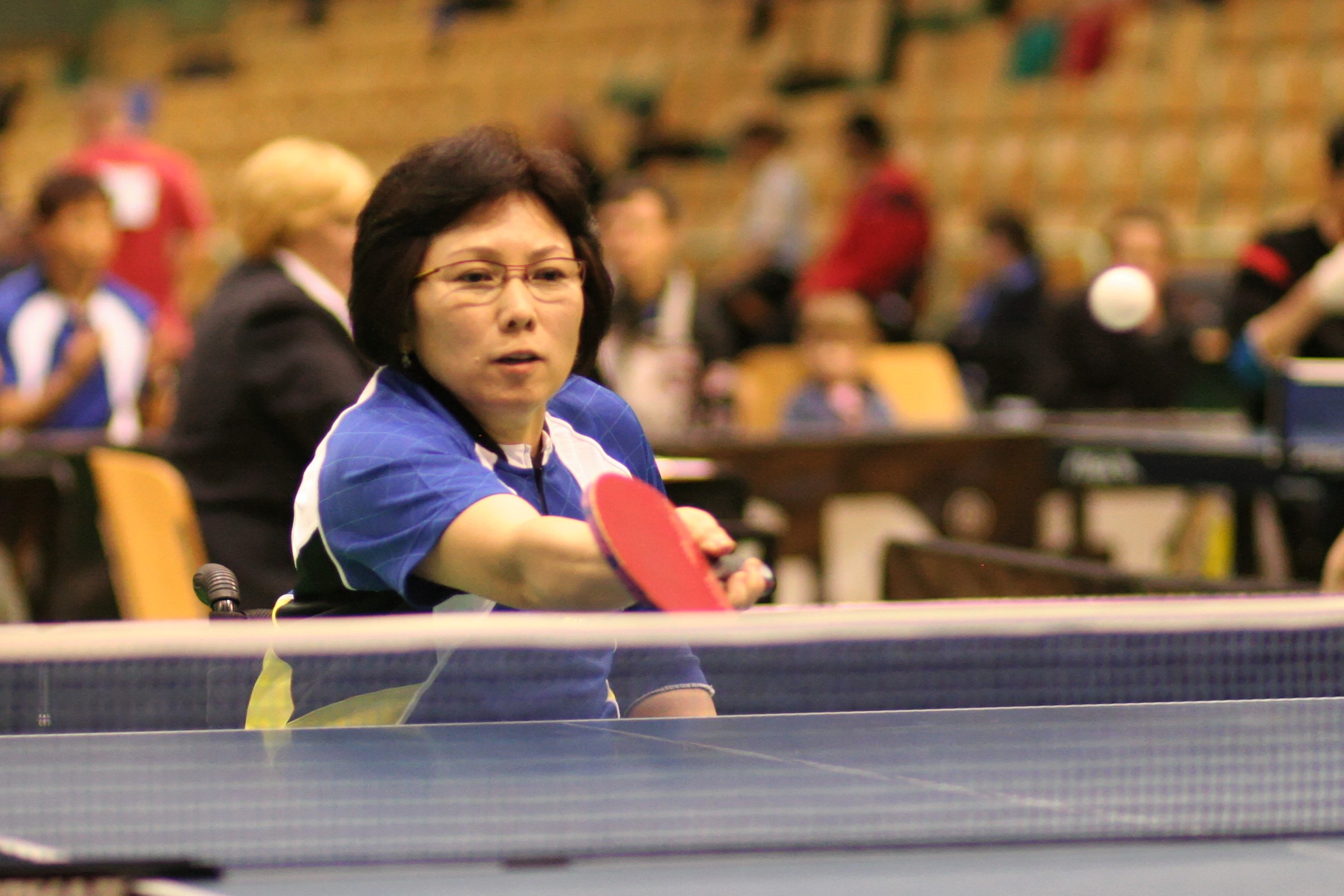
- Choi in 2008

Personal information
- Born: 16 February 1959 (age 67) South Korea

Sport
- Sport: Table tennis
- Playing style: Right-handed shakehand grip
- Disability class: 3
- Highest ranking: 7 (January 2008)
Medal record
Women's para table tennis
Representing South Korea
Paralympic Games
Silver medal – second place	2012 London	Teams C1–3
World Championships
Silver medal – second place	2006 Montreux	Teams C4
Bronze medal – third place	2014 Beijing	Teams C1–3
Asian Para Games
Silver medal – second place	2010 Guangzhou	Teams C1–3
FESPIC Games
Silver medal – second place	2002 Busan	Singles C2–3
Asian and Oceanic Championships
Silver medal – second place	2011 Hong Kong	Singles C3
Bronze medal – third place	2005 Kuala Lumpur	Singles C1–3
Bronze medal – third place	2007 Seoul	Singles C3

Korean name
- Hangul: 최현자
- RR: Choe Hyeonja
- MR: Ch'oe Hyŏnja

Choi Hyun-ja (Korean: 최현자; born 16 February 1959) is a South Korean retired para table tennis player. She won a silver medal at the 2012 Summer Paralympics at age 53.

Her disability was caused by an accident when she was around ten years old. She began playing in 1992, and was the first female para table tennis player in South Korea.
