= Xue Juan (table tennis) =

Chinese para table tennis player

Personal information
- Born: October 20, 1989 (age 36) Pizhou, Jiangsu, China
- Height: 160 cm (5 ft 3 in)
- Weight: 48 kg (106 lb)

Sport
- Sport: Table tennis
- Playing style: Right-handed shakehand grip
- Disability class: 3
- Highest ranking: 1 (November 2018)
- Current ranking: 2 (February 2020)
Medal record
Women's para table tennis
Representing China
Paralympic Games
Gold medal – first place	2016 Rio de Janeiro	Singles C3
Gold medal – first place	2016 Rio de Janeiro	Teams C1–3
Gold medal – first place	2020 Tokyo	Singles C3
Gold medal – first place	2020 Tokyo	Teams C1-3
Gold medal – first place	2024 Paris	Doubles WD5
Bronze medal – third place	2024 Paris	Singles C3
World Championships
Gold medal – first place	2014 Beijing	Teams C1–3
Gold medal – first place	2018 Laško	Singles C3
Silver medal – second place	2014 Beijing	Singles C3
Asian Para Games
Gold medal – first place	2014 Incheon	Teams C1–3
Gold medal – first place	2018 Jakarta	Singles C1–3
Silver medal – second place	2014 Incheon	Singles C3
Silver medal – second place	2018 Jakarta	Teams C2–5
Silver medal – second place	2022 Hangzhou	Singles C3
Asian Championships
Gold medal – first place	2013 Beijing	Teams C1–3
Gold medal – first place	2015 Amman	Teams C1–3
Gold medal – first place	2017 Beijing	Singles C1–3
Gold medal – first place	2017 Beijing	Teams C1–3
Silver medal – second place	2013 Beijing	Singles C3
Silver medal – second place	2015 Amman	Singles C3
Bronze medal – third place	2019 Taichung	Singles C3

Xue Juan (Chinese: 薛娟; pinyin: Xuē Juān, born 20 October 1989) is a Chinese para table tennis player. She won two gold medals at the 2016 Summer Paralympics.

== Personal life ==
Like many of her teammates, Xue was a polio survivor from Pizhou who attended New Hope Center as a child. That's where coach Heng Xin developed her into a star.
