= Alena Kánová =

Slovak para table tennis player and wheelchair curler

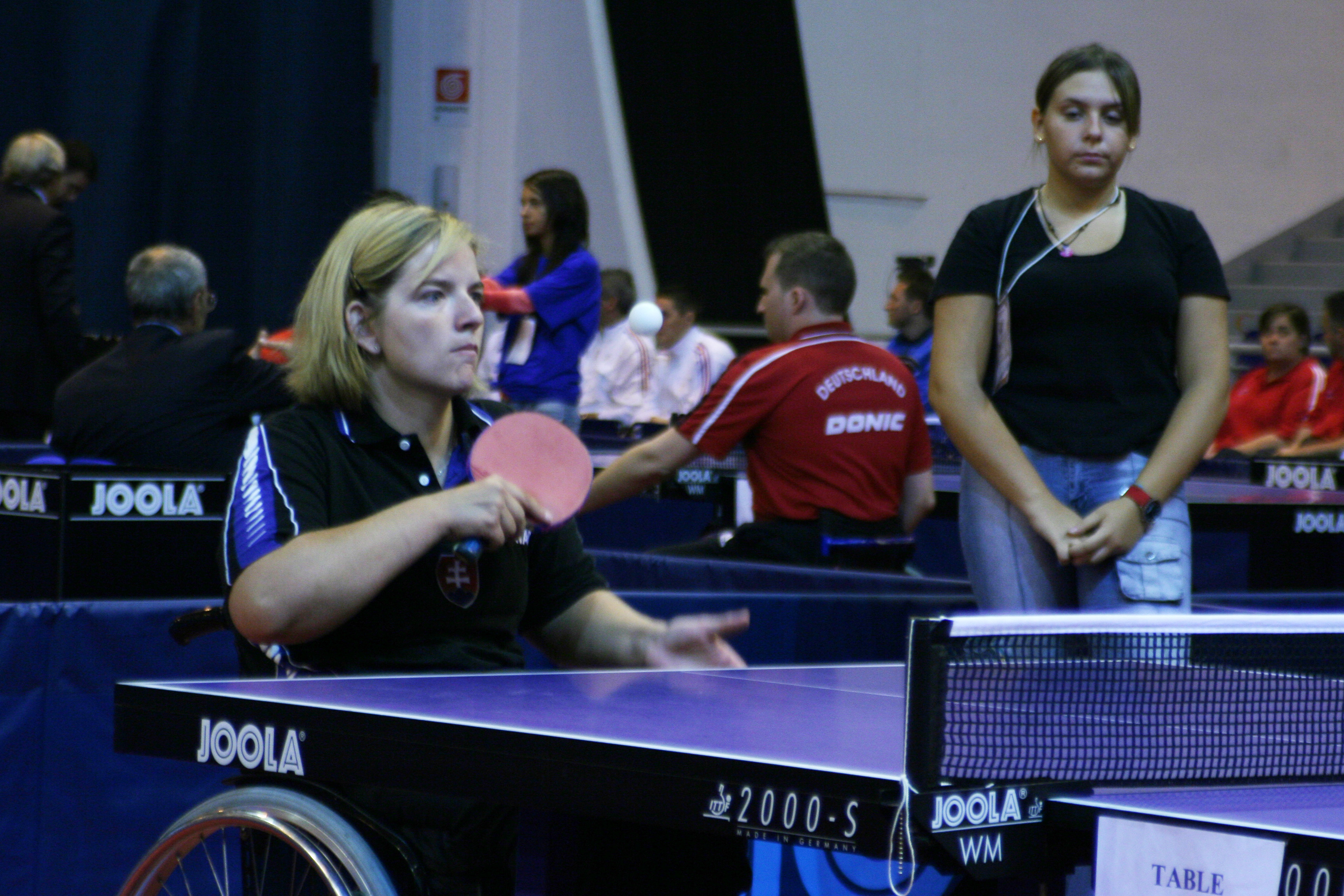
- Kánová in 2015

Personal information
- National team: Slovakia
- Born: 29 March 1980 (age 46) Liptovský Mikuláš, Czechoslovakia

Sport
- Country: Slovakia
- Sport: Table tennis, Wheelchair curling
- Disability class: Class 3
Medal record
Women's table tennis
Representing Slovakia
Paralympic Games
Gold medal – first place	2000 Sydney	Individual class 3
Silver medal – second place	2008 Beijing	Individual class 3
Silver medal – second place	2020 Tokyo	Individual class 3
Bronze medal – third place	2004 Athens	Individual class 3
Bronze medal – third place	2012 London	Individual class 3

Alena Kánová (born 29 March 1980) is a Slovak table tennis player who has played at the Summer Paralympics for her country, winning gold at the 2000 Summer Paralympics, and silver at the 2020 Summer Paralympics. She also competed at the 2014 Winter Paralympics in wheelchair curling.

== Career ==
Alena Kánová was born on 29 March 1980 in Liptovský Mikuláš, Czechoslovakia (now Slovakia). At the age of 14, she was paralysed following a road accident and has used a wheelchair since. After the accident, she attended the Slovak National Rehabilitation Center for a year, before returning to school. She tried several sports, but focused on table tennis as she had a table at home on which she could practice.

Kánová competed in her first Summer Paralympics at the 2000 Games in Sydney, Australia, where she won the gold medal in the individual class 3 tournament. She continued to compete at successive Paralympic Games, winning a bronze in 2004 in Athens, Greece, and a silver at the Beijing Games in 2008. Her most recent medal came at the 2012 Summer Paralympics, when she defeated Welsh athlete Sara Head in the bronze medal match and won her nation's first medal of the competition. She does not keep her Paralympic medals, instead giving them away to those who have helped her compete.

Outside of table tennis, she also competes in wheelchair curling, making the Paralympic team for the Winter Paralympics in 2014 in Sochi, Russia.

== Wheelchair curling teams and events ==
Season	Skip	Third	Second	Lead	Alternate	Coach	Events
2008–09	Radoslav Ďuriš	Dušan Pitoňák	Branislav Jakubec	Alena Kánová	Imrich Lyócsa	Pavol Pitoňák	WWhCQ 2008 (10th)
2010–11	Radoslav Ďuriš	Dušan Pitoňák	Branislav Jakubec	Alena Kánová	Monika Kunkelová	František Pitoňák	WWhCQ 2010 (6th)
2011–12	Radoslav Ďuriš	Branislav Jakubec	Dušan Pitoňák	Monika Kunkelová	Alena Kánová	František Pitoňák	WWhCC 2012 (4th)
2012–13	Radoslav Ďuriš	Branislav Jakubec	Dušan Pitoňák	Monika Kunkelová	Alena Kánová	František Pitoňák	WWhCC 2013 (7th)
2013–14	Radoslav Ďuriš	Branislav Jakubec	Dušan Pitoňák	Monika Kunkelová	Alena Kánová	František Pitoňák	WPG 2014 (6th)
