= Pamela Fontaine =

American para table tennis player

Personal information
- Nationality: United States
- Born: 16 December 1964 (age 61) Columbus, Ohio, U.S.

Sport
- Sport: Table tennis
Medal record
Wheelchair basketball
Paralympic Games
Bronze medal – third place	1996 Atlanta	Women's wheelchair basketball
Para table tennis
Paralympic Games
Silver medal – second place	1984 New York/Stoke Mandeville	Table tennis teams 1A-C
Parapan American Games
Silver medal – second place	2007 Rio de Janeiro	Women's singles C1-3
Silver medal – second place	2007 Rio de Janeiro	Women's teams C4-5
Silver medal – second place	2011 Guadalajara	Women's teams C1-3
Bronze medal – third place	2015 Toronto	Women's singles C3
Pan American Championships
Gold medal – first place	2009 Margarita Island	Women's singles C1-3
Gold medal – first place	2009 Margarita Island	Women's teams C1-3

Pamela Fontaine (born 1964 in Columbus, Ohio) is an American Paralympic table tennis player.

She participated in the 1984 Summer Paralympics but decided to retire three years later. She took up wheelchair basketball and won a bronze medal at the 1996 Summer Paralympics. Five years later she returned to table tennis and became a 3-time silver medalist at both the 2007 and 2011 Parapan American Games for both singles and doubles. In 2009 she won 2 gold medals for the same reasons and at the same place. In 2016 she participated in 2016 Summer Paralympics. Prior to participation at the Paralympic games in Rio, she participated at the Slovakian and Slovenian Opens.
