= Jung Sang-sook =

South Korean para table tennis player

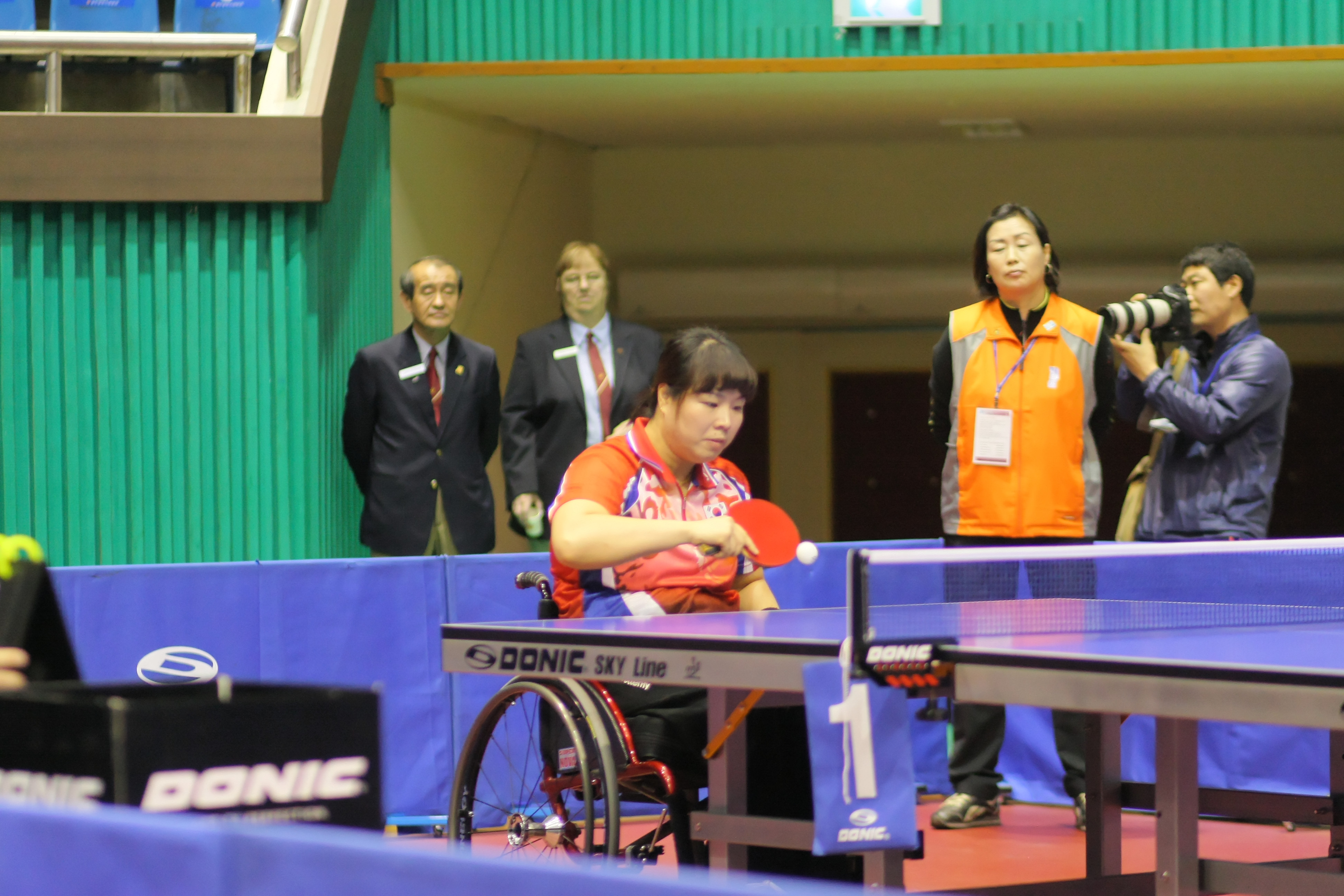
- Jung at the 2010 World Para Table Tennis Championships

Personal information
- Born: 26 February 1980 (age 46) Siheung, Gyeonggi, South Korea

Sport
- Sport: Table tennis
- Playing style: Right-handed shakehand grip
- Disability class: 3
- Highest ranking: 5 (July 2012)
Medal record
Women's para table tennis
Representing South Korea
Paralympic Games
Silver medal – second place	2012 London	Teams C1–3
World Championships
Bronze medal – third place	2010 Gwangju	Singles C3
Asian Para Games
Silver medal – second place	2010 Guangzhou	Teams C1–3
Bronze medal – third place	2010 Guangzhou	Singles C1–3
Asian and Oceanic Championships
Silver medal – second place	2009 Amman	Singles C3
Bronze medal – third place	2009 Amman	Teams C1–3
Bronze medal – third place	2011 Hong Kong	Singles C3

Jung Sang-sook (Korean: 정상숙; RR: Jeong Sangsuk, born 26 February 1980) is a South Korean retired para table tennis player. She won a silver medal at the 2012 Summer Paralympics.

She was disabled in an accident when she was in high school. She began playing in 2007.
