= Nergiz Altıntaş =

Turkish para table tennis player

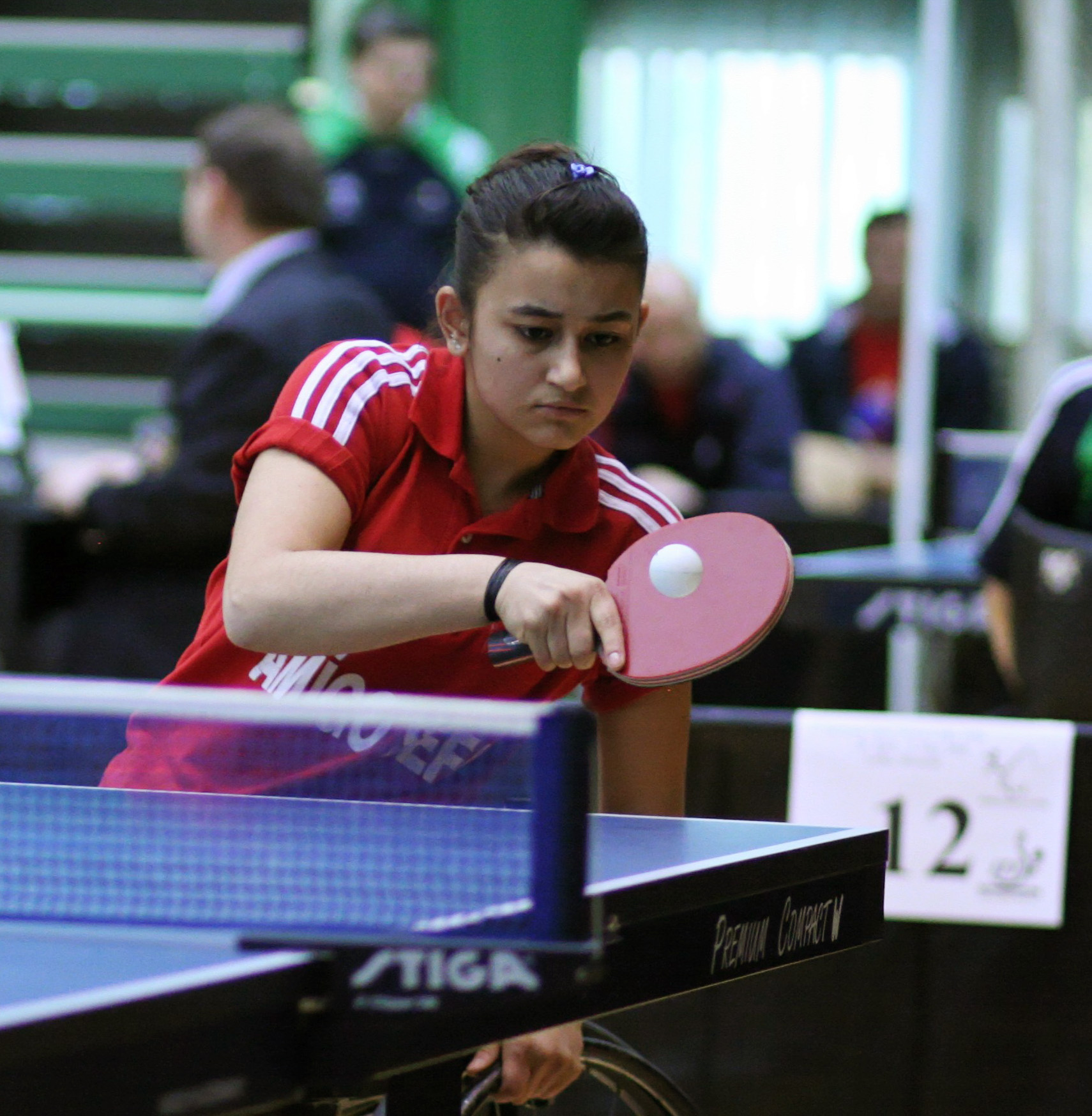
- Altıntaş in 2008

Personal information
- Born: 16 August 1990 (age 35) Nevşehir, Turkey
- Height: 1.70 m (5 ft 7 in)

Sport
- Country: Turkey
- Sport: Para table tennis
- Disability class: C3
Medal record
Para table tennis
Representing Turkey
World Championships
Silver medal – second place	2014 Beijing	Teams C1-3
World Team Championships
Bronze medal – third place	2017 Bratislava	Teams C3
European Championships
Silver medal – second place	2015 Vejle	Teams C1-3
Silver medal – second place	2017 Laško	Teams C2-3
Silver medal – second place	2019 Helsingborg	Teams C1-3
Bronze medal – third place	2015 Vejle	Singles C3

Nergiz Altıntaş (born 16 August 1990) is a Turkish para table tennis player who competes at international table tennis competitions. She is a World silver medalist and a three-time European silver medalist. She has also competed at the 2012 and 2016 Summer Paralympics. In June 2021 she was in Lasko in Slovenia where she beat the Japanese player Yukimi Chada. She and her Turkish teammate, Merve Cansu Demir who also won her match, were awarded quota places for the postponed 2020 Summer Paralympics.
