= Cho Kyoung-hee =

South Korean para table tennis player

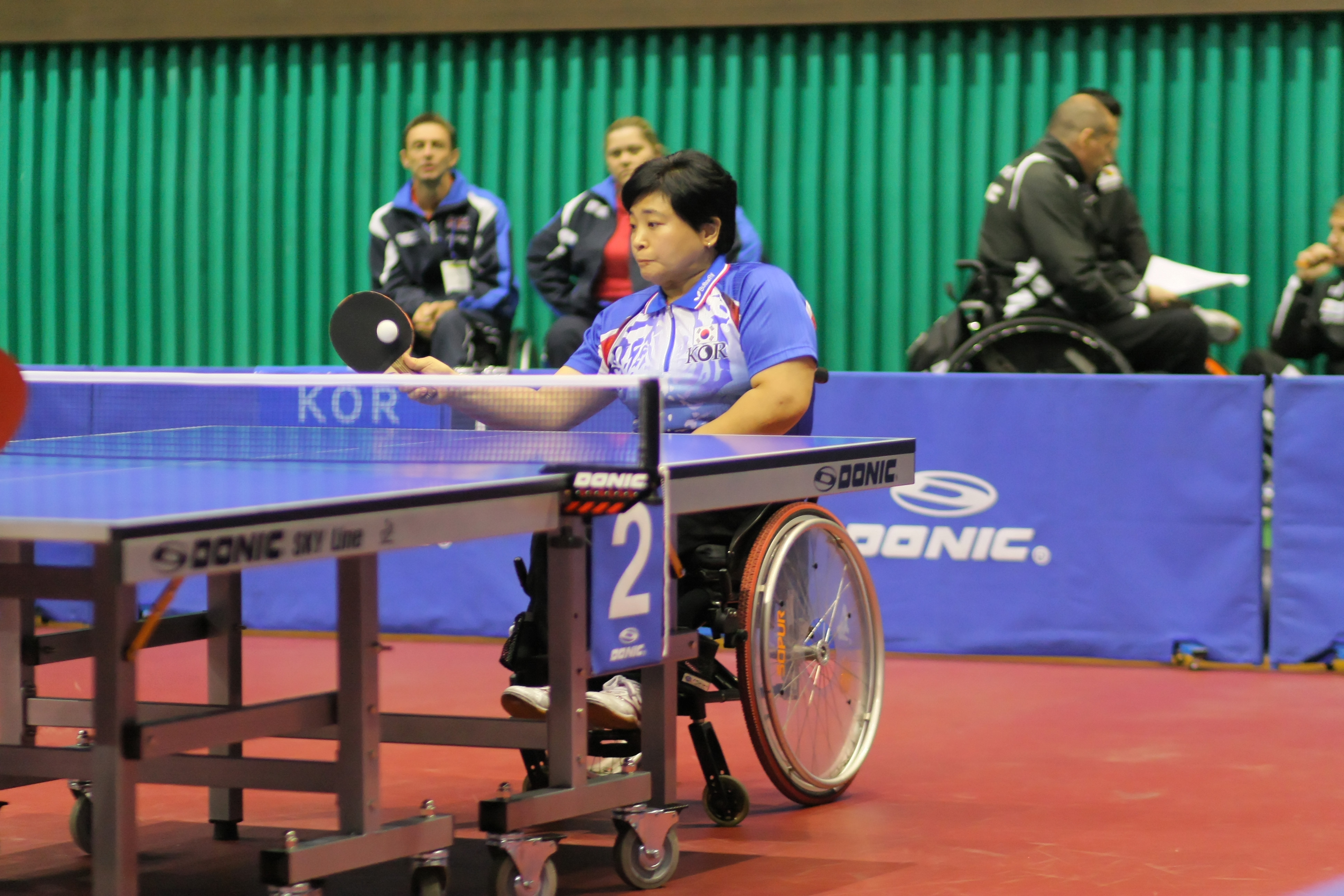
- Cho at the 2010 World Para Table Tennis Championships

Personal information
- Born: 26 August 1962 (age 63) Bucheon, Gyeonggi, South Korea

Sport
- Sport: Table tennis
- Playing style: Right-handed shakehand grip
- Disability class: 3
- Highest ranking: 10 (July 2011)
Medal record
Women's para table tennis
Representing South Korea
Paralympic Games
| Silver medal – second place | 2012 London | Teams C1–3 |
Asian Championships
| Silver medal – second place | 2015 Amman | Teams C1–3 |
| Bronze medal – third place | 2009 Amman | Singles C3 |
| Bronze medal – third place | 2009 Amman | Teams C1–3 |

Cho Kyoung-hee (Korean: 조경희; RR: Jo Gyeonghui, born 26 August 1962) is a South Korean retired para table tennis player. She won a silver medal at the 2012 Summer Paralympics at age 50.

She began playing table tennis in 2005 at age 43, when a doctor advised her to exercise.
