= Michela Brunelli =

Italian paralympic athlete

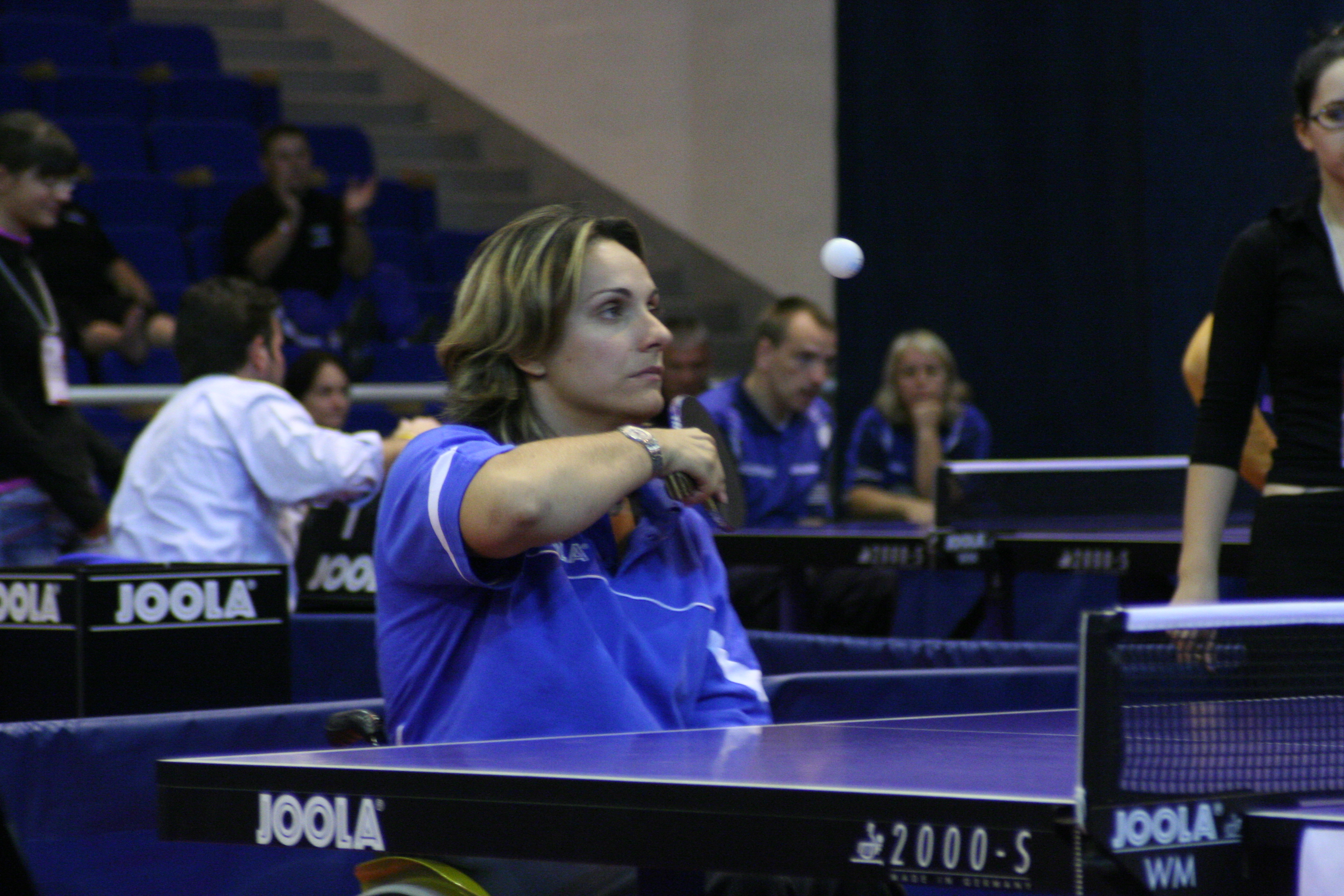
- Brunelli in 2005

Personal information
- Nationality: Italian
- Born: 4 July 1974 (age 52) Bussolengo, Italy

Sport
- Country: Italy
- Sport: Para table tennis
Medal record
Women's para table tennis
Representing Italy
Paralympic Games
Silver medal – second place	2008 Beijing	Team class 1–3
Bronze medal – third place	2020 Tokyo	Team class 1–3

Michela Brunelli (born 5 July 1974 in Bussolengo) is an Italian paralympic athlete who won a silver medal at the 2008 Summer Paralympics. She competed at the 2020 Summer Paralympics, in Women's team – Class 1–3, winning a bronze medal.

== Biography ==
As a result of an accident she is paraplegic from the age of 17. She competed at the 2017 Romanian Para International Open.

== Others achievements ==
Year	Competition	Venue	Position	Event	Notes
2008	Summer Paralympics	(China) Beijing	2nd	Team class 1–3	
2012	Summer Paralympics	(United Kingdom) London	Qual.	Individual class 3	
2012	Summer Paralympics	(United Kingdom) London	4th	Team class 1-3	
2016	Summer Paralympics	(Brazil) Rio de Janeiro	Quarterfinal	Team class 1–3	
2016	Summer Paralympics	(Brazil) Rio de Janeiro	4th	Individual class 3	
2020	Summer Paralympics	(Japan) Tokyo	3rd	Team class 1–3	

== See also ==
- Italy at the 2012 Summer Paralympics
