= Hatice Duman (table tennis) =

Turkish para table tennis player

Personal information
- Nationality: Turkish
- Born: 12 August 1994 (age 31) Balıkesir, Turkey

Sport
- Country: Turkey
- Sport: Para table tennis
Medal record
Women's table tennis (class 3)
Representing Turkey
World Championships
Bronze medal – third place	2014 Beijing	Individual C3
European Championships
Bronze medal – third place	20147 Laško	Individual C3

Hatice Duman (born 12 August 1994) is a Turkish female para table tennis player of class 3 and Paralympian. She is a native of Balıkesir, Turkey.

Duman won the bronze medal at the 2012 International Para Table Tennis Tournament in Germany. She took the bronze medal in the Individual C3 event of the 2014 World Para Table Tennis Championships in Beijing, China. She became bronze medalist at the 2017 European Para Table Tennis Championships in Laško, Slovenia. She won the bronze medal at the 2018 International Tournament in Laško, Slovenia. At the 2019 International Para Table Tennis Tournament held in Amman, Jordan, she took the bronze medal.

She participated at the 2012 and 2016 Paralympics. She obtained a quota for the 2020 Paralympics.
