= Helena Dretar Karić =

Croatian para table tennis player (born 1979)

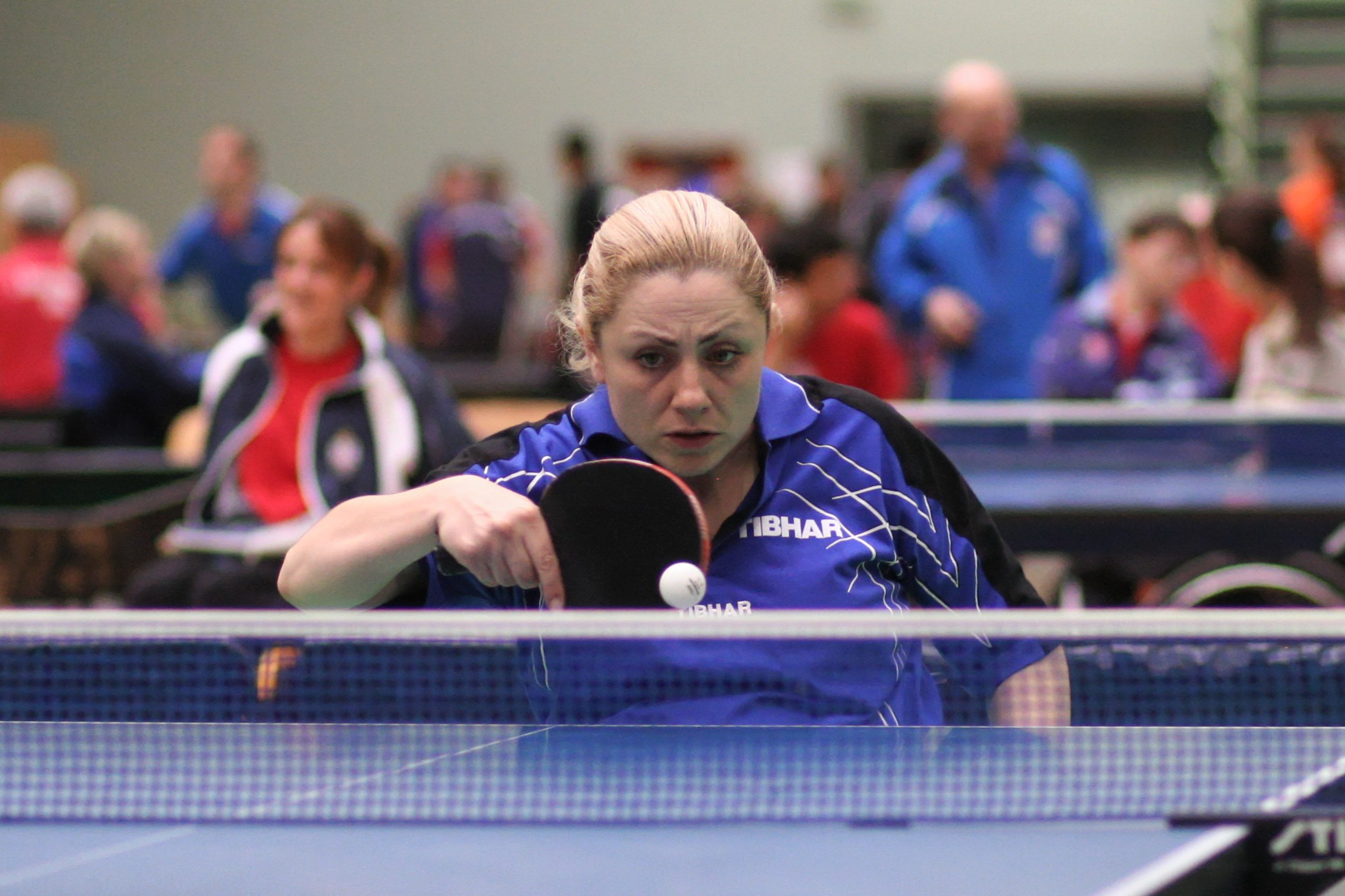
- Dretar Karić in 2009

Personal information
- Born: 28 November 1979 (age 46) Varaždin, SR Croatia, Yugoslavia

Sport
- Country: Croatia
- Sport: Para table tennis
- Disability class: C3
Medal record
Women's para table tennis
Representing Croatia
Paralympic Games
| Silver medal – second place | 2016 Rio de Janeiro | Teams C1–3 |
| Bronze medal – third place | 2020 Tokyo | Teams C1–3 |
World Championships
| Silver medal – second place | 2017 Bratislava | Teams C3 |
| Bronze medal – third place | 2014 Beijing | Teams C1–3 |
European Championships
| Gold medal – first place | 2013 Lignano | Teams C1–3 |
| Gold medal – first place | 2015 Vejle | Teams C1–3 |
| Gold medal – first place | 2017 Laško | Teams C2–3 |
| Gold medal – first place | 2019 Helsingborg | Teams C1–3 |
| Gold medal – first place | 2023 Sheffield | Doubles WD5-10 |
| Bronze medal – third place | 2011 Split | Teams C3 |
| Bronze medal – third place | 2019 Helsingborg | Singles C3 |

Helena Dretar Karić (born 28 November 1979) is a Croatian para table tennis player who competes in the C3 category.

== Background ==
Dretar Karić was born in Varaždin on 28 November 1979. She was a talented handball player, who was hit by a car as a pedestrian at the age of 17 and has been in a wheelchair ever since. While recuperating in Varaždinske Toplice, she met the Croatian Paralympic table tennis team, and after that, she started playing the sport more intensively in 2008. She played in several clubs, mostly in the Zagreb club STKOI "Uriho".

== Career ==
Together with Anđela Mužinić, Dretar Karić won numerous medals, including medals at the Paralympic Games (2016, 2020), at the World Championships (2014, 2017) and at the European Championships, of which five were gold at the European Championships (2013–2023) and one bronze (2011). At the 2016 Summer Paralympics, Dretar Karić won silver in a pair with Muzinić. Four years later, at the 2020 Summer Paralympics, they won bronze.

== Awards and honors ==
Dretar Karić received the "Franjo Bučar" State Sports Award and the Order of the Croatian Danica with the image of Franjo Bučar. As part of the Croatian Paralympic table tennis team, she received the Sportske novosti award in 2015 and 2021, in the category of women's team of the year.
