= Anđela Mužinić =

Croatian para table tennis player

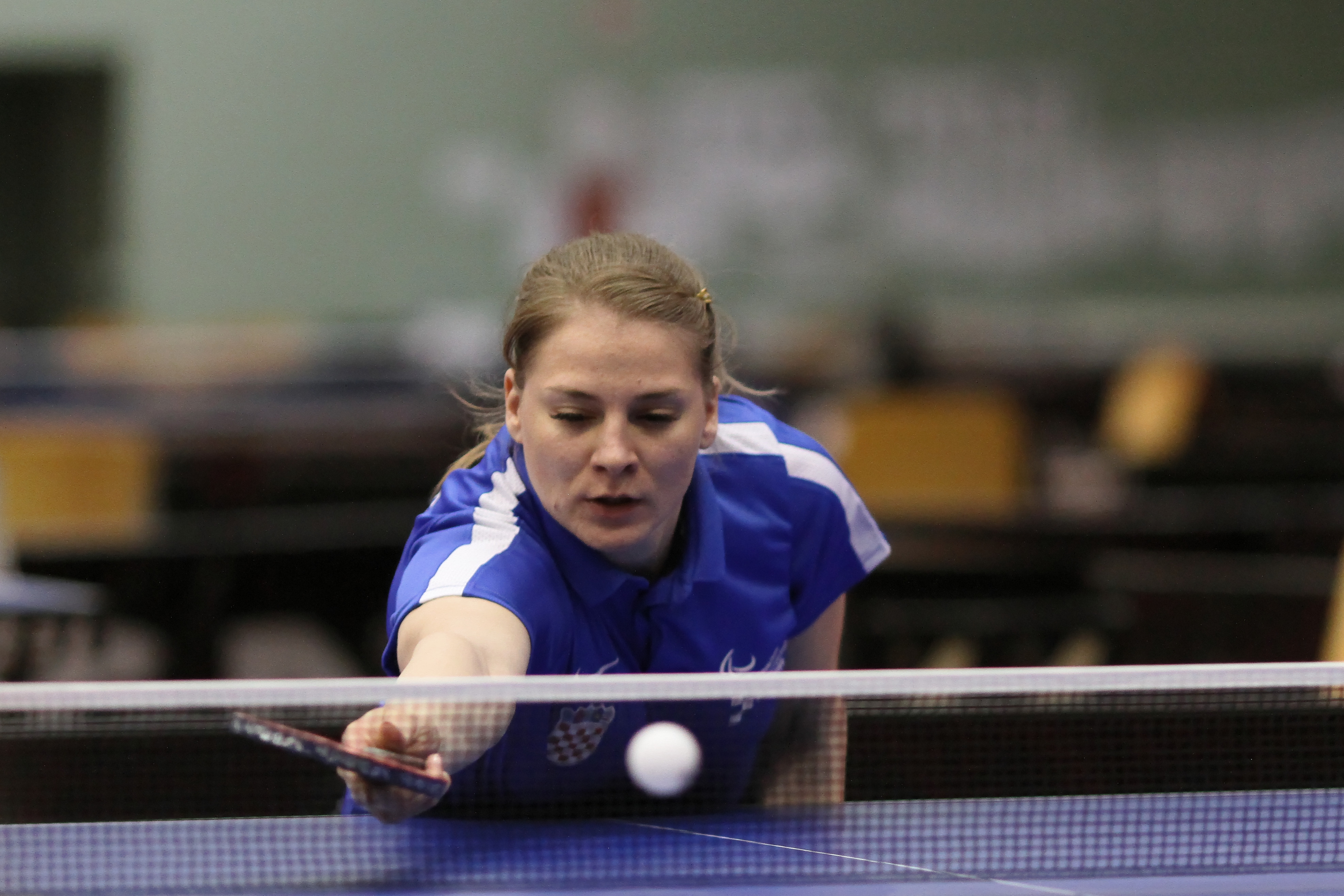
- Mužinić in 2017

Personal information
- Born: 1 January 1992 (age 34) Split, Croatia

Sport
- Country: Croatia
- Sport: Para-athletics
- Disability class: C3
- Event: Para table tennis
Medal record
Women's para table tennis
Representing Croatia
Paralympic Games
Gold medal – first place	2024 Paris	Singles C3
Silver medal – second place	2016 Rio de Janeiro	Teams C1–3
Bronze medal – third place	2020 Tokyo	Teams C1–3
World Championships
Silver medal – second place	2017 Bratislava	Teams C3
Silver medal – second place	2022 Granada	Singles C3
Bronze medal – third place	2014 Beijing	Teams C1–3
Bronze medal – third place	2018 Laško	Singles C3
European Championships
Gold medal – first place	2013 Lignano	Teams C1–3
Gold medal – first place	2015 Vejle	Teams C1–3
Gold medal – first place	2017 Laško	Teams C2–3
Gold medal – first place	2019 Helsingborg	Teams C1–3
Gold medal – first place	2023 Sheffield	Singles C3
Gold medal – first place	2023 Sheffield	Doubles WD5-10
Silver medal – second place	2015 Vejle	Singles C3
Silver medal – second place	2017 Laško	Singles C3
Bronze medal – third place	2011 Split	Teams C3
Bronze medal – third place	2019 Helsingborg	Singles C3

Anđela Mužinić Vincetić is a Croatian table tennis Paralympic player. In pair with Helena Dretar Karić in doubles, they won two medals both in the Paralympics (2016, 2020) and World Championships (2014, 2017) as well as six medals at the European Championships, five of which were gold (2013–2023) and one bronze (2011). She also won two medals at the World Championships (2014, 2017) and three at the European Championships (2015–2019) in singles.

She won a silver medal with her partner Helena Dretar Karić in Class 1–3 table tennis during the 2016 Summer Paralympics.

Until the traffic accident in Srinjine (near Split), in which she suffered fracture of the seventh and eighth thoracic vertebrae with her legs being completely taken away, she played volleyball. While recuperating in Varaždinske Toplice, she was visited by Helena Dretar Karić and introduced to para table tennis. After four months, she returned to elementary school and started playing table tennis.
