= Iran at the 2010 Asian Para Games =

- IOC code: IRI
- NPC: I.R. Iran National Paralympic Committee

in Guangzhou 12–19 December 2010
- Competitors: 156 in 14 sports
- Flag bearer: Shahabeddin Bassamtabar
- Medals Ranked 4th: Gold 27 Silver 24 Bronze 29 Total 80

Asian Para Games appearances (overview)
- 2010; 2014; 2018; 2022

Youth appearances
- 2009; 2013; 2017; 2021

Iran participated in the 2010 Asian Para Games in Guangzhou, China on 13–19 December 2010. 156 athletes represented Iran in the first Asian Para Games. Shahabeddin Bassamtabar was the flag bearer for Iran in the opening ceremony.

== Competitors ==
Sport	Men	Women	Total
Archery	6	3	9
Athletics	32	3	35
Boccia	3	3	6
Cycling	7		7
Football 5-a-side	10		10
Football 7-a-side	12		12
Goalball	6	6	12
Judo	6		6
Powerlifting	10		10
Shooting	2	3	5
Sitting volleyball	12	12	24
Swimming	10		10
Table tennis	4	4	8
Wheelchair tennis	2		2
Total	122	34	156

== Medal summary ==
=== Medal table ===
Sport	Gold	Silver	Bronze	Total
Archery	2	1	2	5
Athletics	14	10	10	34
Cycling			1	1
Football 5-a-side		1		1
Football 7-a-side	1			1
Goalball			2	2
Judo	2	2	2	6
Powerlifting	3	5	1	9
Shooting	1	1	2	4
Sitting volleyball	1		1	2
Swimming	3	3	7	13
Table tennis		1	1	2
Total	27	24	29	80

=== Medalists ===
Medal	Name	Sport	Event
Gold	Ebrahim Ranjbar	Archery	Men's individual recurve W1/W2
Gold	Razieh Shirmohammadi	Archery	Women's individual recurve standing
Gold	Abbas Dayani	Athletics	Men's 800 m T46
Gold	Abbas Dayani	Athletics	Men's 1500 m T46
Gold	Salman Ab-Bariki	Athletics	Men's shot put F34
Gold	Farhad Raiga	Athletics	Men's shot put F42
Gold	Jalil Bagheri Jeddi	Athletics	Men's shot put F54/55/56
Gold	Javad Hardani	Athletics	Men's discus throw F37/38
Gold	Mehrdad Karamzadeh	Athletics	Men's discus throw F42
Gold	Farzad Sepahvand	Athletics	Men's discus throw F44
Gold	Javid Ehsani	Athletics	Men's discus throw F57/58
Gold	Erfan Hosseini	Athletics	Men's javelin throw F13
Gold	Siamak Saleh-Farajzadeh	Athletics	Men's javelin throw F33/34
Gold	Kamran Shokri	Athletics	Men's javelin throw F42
Gold	Ali Naderi	Athletics	Men's javelin throw F54/55/56
Gold	Marzieh Sedghi	Athletics	Women's javelin throw F54/55/56
Gold	Mehran Nikouei; Jasem Bakhshi; Hashem Rastegari; Sadegh Hassani; Farzad Mehri; Behnam Sohrabi; Nasser Hosseinifar; Morteza Heidari; Bahman Ansari; Ehsan Gholamhosseinpour; Moslem Akbari; Ardeshir Mahini	Football 7-a-side	Men
Gold	Saeid Rahmati	Judo	Men's 66 kg
Gold	Hamzeh Nadri	Judo	Men's +100 kg
Gold	Hamzeh Mohammadi	Powerlifting	Men's 60 kg
Gold	Majid Farzin	Powerlifting	Men's 75 kg
Gold	Siamand Rahman	Powerlifting	Men's +100 kg
Gold	Ramezan Salehnejad	Shooting	Men's 10 m air rifle standing SH1
Gold	Ramezan Salehi; Mohammad Reza Rahimi; Arash Khormali; Davoud Alipourian; Hadi Sajedinia; Nasser Hassanpour; Majid Lashgari; Jalil Imeri; Ahmad Eiri; Issa Zirahi; Abolfazl Moharramkhani; Meisam Alipour	Sitting volleyball	Men
Gold	Shahin Izadyar	Swimming	Men's 50 m freestyle S10
Gold	Shahin Izadyar	Swimming	Men's 100 m freestyle S10
Gold	Vahid Keshtkar	Swimming	Men's 400 m freestyle S12
Silver	Roham Shahabipour; Ebrahim Ranjbar; Heshmatollah Kazemi	Archery	Men's ream recurve open
Silver	Ahmad Reza Kazemi	Athletics	Men's 400 m T13
Silver	Hassan Askari	Athletics	Men's 800 m T12
Silver	Mehdi Asghari	Athletics	Men's shot put F42
Silver	Mehdi Moradi	Athletics	Men's shot put F57/58
Silver	Jalal Khakzadieh	Athletics	Men's discus throw F32/33/34
Silver	Mohammad Ali Malekpour	Athletics	Men's discus throw F54/55/56
Silver	Mehdi Moradi	Athletics	Men's discus throw F57/58
Silver	Mohsen Kaedi	Athletics	Men's javelin throw F35/36
Silver	Marzieh Sedghi	Athletics	Women's shot put F54/55/56
Silver	Leila Maleki	Athletics	Women's javelin throw F54/55/56
Silver	Morteza Maboudi; Amir Pourrazavi; Kambiz Mohkam; Maghsoud Gholizadeh; Mohammad Reza Jalili; Hamid Shalhavizadeh; Mohammad Heidari; Ahmad Shahhosseini; Hossein Rajabpour; Asghar Rouhi	Football 5-a-side	Men
Silver	Hani Asakereh	Judo	Men's 81 kg
Silver	Hamed Alizadeh	Judo	Men's 100 kg
Silver	Yousef Yousefi	Powerlifting	Men's 56 kg
Silver	Nader Moradi	Powerlifting	Men's 60 kg
Silver	Ali Hosseini	Powerlifting	Men's 67.5 kg
Silver	Hamed Solhipour	Powerlifting	Men's 82.5 kg
Silver	Kazem Rajabi	Powerlifting	Men's +100 kg
Silver	Sareh Javanmardi	Shooting	Women's 10 m air pistol SH1
Silver	Shahin Izadyar	Swimming	Men's 100 m breaststroke SB9
Silver	Vahid Keshtkar	Swimming	Men's 100 m breaststroke SB12
Silver	Vahid Keshtkar	Swimming	Men's 200 m individual medley SM13
Silver	Javad Fouladi	Table tennis	Men's singles 5
Bronze	Roham Shahabipour	Archery	Men's individual recurve W1/W2
Bronze	Zahra Nemati	Archery	Women's individual recurve W1/W2
Bronze	Ali Elahi	Athletics	Men's 5000 m T12
Bronze	Siamak Saleh-Farajzadeh	Athletics	Men's shot put F34
Bronze	Siamak Saleh-Farajzadeh	Athletics	Men's discus throw F32/33/34
Bronze	Jalil Bagheri Jeddi	Athletics	Men's discus throw F54/55/56
Bronze	Sajjad Nikparast	Athletics	Men's javelin throw F13
Bronze	Javad Hardani	Athletics	Men's javelin throw F37/38
Bronze	Ali Omidi	Athletics	Men's javelin throw F44
Bronze	Leila Maleki	Athletics	Women's shot put F54/55/56
Bronze	Fatemeh Montazeri	Athletics	Women's shot put F57/58
Bronze	Fatemeh Montazeri	Athletics	Women's discus throw F57/58
Bronze	Bahman Golbarnezhad	Cycling	Men's road race C4–5
Bronze	Mehdi Sayyahi; Javad Shirdel; Mohsen Jalilvand; Behzad Jahangiri; Mostafa Shahbazi; Mohammad Soranji	Goalball	Men
Bronze	Saeideh Ghamsari; Tayyebeh Esteki; Maryam Kouhfallah; Maryam Devisti; Samira Jalilvand; Zeinab Ghanbari	Goalball	Women
Bronze	Mohammad Alishanani	Judo	Men's 73 kg
Bronze	Amir Mirhassan Nattaj	Judo	Men's 90 kg
Bronze	Ali Sadeghzadeh	Powerlifting	Men's 90 kg
Bronze	Alieh Mahmoudi	Shooting	Women's 10 m air pistol SH1
Bronze	Azam Rezaei	Shooting	Women's 10 m air rifle standing SH1
Bronze	Masoumeh Zareei; Zeinab Maleki; Azam Amouei; Zahra Delkhosh; Zahra Gol; Safieh Alighorchi; Nasrin Farhadi; Sakineh Keshvari; Eshrat Kordestani; Tayyebeh Jafari; Mehri Fallahi; Zahra Abdi	Sitting volleyball	Women
Bronze	Ali Nikoo Hosseinabadi	Swimming	Men's 100 m freestyle S6
Bronze	Vahid Keshtkar	Swimming	Men's 100 m freestyle S12
Bronze	Vahid Keshtkar	Swimming	Men's 100 m backstroke S12
Bronze	Mohammad Dalir	Swimming	Men's 100 m backstroke S13
Bronze	Shahin Izadyar	Swimming	Men's 200 m individual medley SM10
Bronze	Hassan Ghamkhah; Ali Nikoo Hosseinabadi; Mehdi Akbarinejad; Shahin Izadyar	Swimming	Men's 4 × 100 m freestyle relay 34 pts
Bronze	Hassan Ghamkhah; Shahin Izadyar; Reza Azarshab; Ali Nikoo Hosseinabadi	Swimming	Men's 4 × 100 m medley relay 34 pts
Bronze	Forough Bakhtiari; Elham Chazani	Table tennis	Women's team 1–3

== Results by event ==
=== Archery ===
Men's recurve

Athlete	Event	Ranking round		1/16 eliminations	1/8 eliminations	Quarterfinal	Semifinal	Final	Rank
Athlete	Event	Score	Rank	1/16 eliminations	1/8 eliminations	Quarterfinal	Semifinal	Final	Rank
Heshmatollah Kazemi	Individual standing	579	10 Q	Shukurov (UZB); W 4–0; 49–42, 49–31	Onodera (JPN); L 0–4; 44–54, 49–52	Did not advance			9
Ebrahim Ranjbar	Individual W1/W2	620	4 Q	Bye	Kim (KOR); W 4–0; 50–46, 54–50	Sidik (MAS); W 6–4; 20–24, 26–24, 26–20, 26–27, 25–21	Lee (KOR); W 7–3; 27–26, 27–30, 26–26, 24–18, 29–28	Cheng (CHN); W 7–3; 23–26, 24–21, 25–22, 27–27, 22–21	1st place, gold medalist(s)
Roham Shahabipour	Individual W1/W2	605	10 Q	Bye	Saleh (MAS); W 4–0; 53–48, 54–50	Jung (KOR); W 6–4; 27–26, 26–27, 24–27, 24–22, 27–26	Cheng (CHN); L 0–6; 26–28, 23–26, 23–28	3rd place match Lee (KOR); W 6–4; 25–26, 21–22, 26–19, 24–22, 26–16	3rd place, bronze medalist(s)
Roham Shahabipour; Ebrahim Ranjbar; Heshmatollah Kazemi	Team open	1804	3 Q		Bye	Japan; W 191–175	Malaysia; W 189–188	China; L 184–203	2nd place, silver medalist(s)

Men's compound

Athlete	Event	Ranking round		1/8 eliminations	Quarterfinal	Semifinal	Final	Rank
Athlete	Event	Score	Rank	1/8 eliminations	Quarterfinal	Semifinal	Final	Rank
Hassan Aboutalebi	Individual open	630	13 Q	Hsu (TPE); L 2–4; 56–55, 54–55, 50–51	Did not advance			9
Shahabeddin Bassamtabar	Individual open	646	8 Q	Huang (CHN); W 4–3; 51–51, 52–54, 55–53, 9–8	Lee (KOR); L 3–7; 26–28, 28–27, 27–27, 24–29, 27–28	Did not advance		8
Shahab Reihani	Individual open	654	6 Q	Ching (HKG); W 4–2; 56–47, 51–54, 58–48	Kweon (KOR); L 3–7; 27–29, 28–27, 27–27, 27–28, 24–26	Did not advance		7

Women's recurve

Athlete	Event	Ranking round		1/8 eliminations	Quarterfinal	Semifinal	Final	Rank
Athlete	Event	Score	Rank	1/8 eliminations	Quarterfinal	Semifinal	Final	Rank
Razieh Shirmohammadi	Individual standing	581	6 Q	Wen (CHN); W 4–0; 43–39, 51–44	Yan (CHN); W 6–2; 18–22, 27–20, 20–17, 25–21	Lee (KOR); W 6–5; 26–26, 20–28, 25–25, 23–23, 26–24, 10–8	Kim (KOR); W 6–2; 21–27, 23–20, 25–21, 24–23	1st place, gold medalist(s)
Zahra Nemati	Individual W1/W2	593	2 Q		Abd Wahab (MAS); W 6–2; 25–26, 25–16, 24–22, 26–22	Xiao (CHN); L 1–7; 19–22, 24–24, 25–26, 25–26	3rd place match Yuan (CHN); W 6–4; 21–23, 22–15, 21–24, 23–20, 26–22	3rd place, bronze medalist(s)

Women's compound

Athlete	Event	Ranking round		Quarterfinal	Semifinal	Final	Rank
Athlete	Event	Score	Rank	Quarterfinal	Semifinal	Final	Rank
Nafiseh Ahmadi	Individual open	612	6 Q	Nagano (JPN); L 2–6; 25–27, 28–26, 25–28, 22–24	Did not advance		8

=== Athletics ===
Men

Athlete	Event	Round 1			Semifinal			Final		Rank
Athlete	Event	Heat	Time	Rank	Heat	Time	Rank	Time	Rank	Rank
Hamid Imanpour	100 m T11	1	12.43	3 q	1	12.22	3 q	12.47	4	4
Hamid Imanpour	200 m T11	4	25.22	1 Q	2	25.42	3	Did not advance		5
Hamid Imanpour	400 m T11				2	59.71	2 q	1:04.15	4	4
Ahmad Reza Kazemi	100 m T13				3	13.76	7	Did not advance		18
Ahmad Reza Kazemi	200 m T13				1	23.84	2 Q	Disqualified		—
Ahmad Reza Kazemi	400 m T13				1	54.54	2 Q	53.49	2	2nd place, silver medalist(s)
Mohammad Barrangi	100 m T46				3	11.44	2 Q	11.49	4	4
Mohammad Barrangi	200 m T46				3	23.73	2 Q	23.66	4	4
Hassan Askari	400 m T12				1	1:16.60	4	Did not advance		7
Hassan Askari	800 m T12				3	2:06.72	2 q	2:05.72	2	2nd place, silver medalist(s)
Abbas Dayani	400 m T46				2	53.94	2 Q	56.99	8	8
Abbas Dayani	800 m T46				2	2:13.29	2 Q	2:03.11	1	1st place, gold medalist(s)
Abbas Dayani	1500 m T46							4:17.93	1	1st place, gold medalist(s)
Ali Elahi	5000 m T12							16:28.69	3	3rd place, bronze medalist(s)

Athlete	Event	Result	Score	Rank
Salman Ab-Bariki	Shot put F34	10.47	941	1st place, gold medalist(s)
Siamak Saleh-Farajzadeh	Shot put F34	9.05	794	3rd place, bronze medalist(s)
Siamak Saleh-Farajzadeh	Discus throw F32/33/34	38.26	984	3rd place, bronze medalist(s)
Siamak Saleh-Farajzadeh	Javelin throw F33/34	26.34	872	1st place, gold medalist(s)
Javad Hardani	Shot put F37/38	12.56	803	5
Javad Hardani	Discus throw F37/38	44.39	960	1st place, gold medalist(s)
Javad Hardani	Javelin throw F37/38	46.28	914	3rd place, bronze medalist(s)
Mehdi Asghari	Shot put F42	12.69		2nd place, silver medalist(s)
Mehdi Asghari	Discus throw F42	32.73		8
Farhad Raiga	Shot put F42	12.81		1st place, gold medalist(s)
Abdolnabi Navaser	Shot put F44/46	13.56	848	5
Jalil Bagheri Jeddi	Shot put F54/55/56	10.89	961	1st place, gold medalist(s)
Jalil Bagheri Jeddi	Discus throw F54/55/56	35.42	964	3rd place, bronze medalist(s)
Mahmoud Panahi	Shot put F54/55/56	8.66	782	6
Mehdi Moradi	Shot put F57/58	13.20	928	2nd place, silver medalist(s)
Mehdi Moradi	Discus throw F57/58	41.03	874	2nd place, silver medalist(s)
Jalal Khakzadieh	Discus throw F32/33/34	39.68	1000	2nd place, silver medalist(s)
Mohsen Kaedi	Discus throw F35/36	40.91	881	4
Mohsen Kaedi	Javelin throw F35/36	42.47	870	2nd place, silver medalist(s)
Mehrdad Karamzadeh	Discus throw F42	39.81		1st place, gold medalist(s)
Kamran Shokri	Discus throw F42	29.74		9
Kamran Shokri	Javelin throw F42	46.84		1st place, gold medalist(s)
Farzad Sepahvand	Discus throw F44	52.60		1st place, gold medalist(s)
Abdolreza Jokar	Discus throw F51/52/53	17.50	648	3
Abdolreza Jokar	Javelin throw F52/53	20.00	931	1
Mohammad Ali Malekpour	Discus throw F54/55/56	36.11	971	2nd place, silver medalist(s)
Ali Mohammadyari	Discus throw F54/55/56	39.29	961	4
Javid Ehsani	Discus throw F57/58	43.21	915	1st place, gold medalist(s)
Habibollah Naderloo	Discus throw F57/58	45.52	764	7
Erfan Hosseini	Javelin throw F13	59.50 WR		1st place, gold medalist(s)
Sajjad Nikparast	Javelin throw F13	55.98		3rd place, bronze medalist(s)
Ali Omidi	Javelin throw F44	50.99		3rd place, bronze medalist(s)
Ali Naderi	Javelin throw F54/55/56	30.09	973	1st place, gold medalist(s)
Mohammad Reza Mirzaei	Javelin throw F57/58	38.00	880	5
Hamid Moghaddam	Javelin throw F57/58	37.91	878	6
Abdolkazem Saki	Javelin throw F57/58	34.08	783	9

Women

Athlete	Event	Result	Score	Rank
Leila Maleki	Shot put F54/55/56	5.87	709	3rd place, bronze medalist(s)
Leila Maleki	Javelin throw F54/55/56	14.66	724	2nd place, silver medalist(s)
Marzieh Sedghi	Shot put F54/55/56	5.47	738	2nd place, silver medalist(s)
Marzieh Sedghi	Javelin throw F54/55/56	12.69	776	1st place, gold medalist(s)
Fatemeh Montazeri	Shot put F57/58	8.33	821	3rd place, bronze medalist(s)
Fatemeh Montazeri	Discus throw F57/58	27.98	633	3rd place, bronze medalist(s)

=== Boccia ===
Open

Athlete	Event	Preliminary		Quarterfinal	Semifinal	Final	Rank
Athlete	Event	Groups	Rank	Quarterfinal	Semifinal	Final	Rank
Masoumeh Abdi	Individual BC1	Leung (HKG); L 1–9	Group B 3	Did not advance			10
Masoumeh Abdi	Individual BC1	Tang (MAC); W 6–4	Group B 3	Did not advance			10
Masoumeh Abdi	Individual BC1	Ng (SIN); W 18–0	Group B 3	Did not advance			10
Abbas Abbasi	Individual BC2	Lee (MAS); L 3–7	Group B 5	Did not advance			16
Abbas Abbasi	Individual BC2	Kwok (HKG); L 1–8	Group B 5	Did not advance			16
Abbas Abbasi	Individual BC2	Sugimura (JPN); L 1–5	Group B 5	Did not advance			16
Abbas Abbasi	Individual BC2	Yeung (HKG); L 2–4	Group B 5	Did not advance			16
Reza Mohammadipanah	Individual BC3	Kato (JPN); L 2–7	Group B 5	Did not advance			13
Reza Mohammadipanah	Individual BC3	Taha (SIN); L 2–11	Group B 5	Did not advance			13
Reza Mohammadipanah	Individual BC3	Chan (HKG); W 5–1	Group B 5	Did not advance			13
Reza Mohammadipanah	Individual BC3	Visaratanunta (THA); L 0–14	Group B 5	Did not advance			13
Leila Niazi	Individual BC3	Jeong (KOR); L 0–16	Group A 5	Did not advance			14
Leila Niazi	Individual BC3	Ching (HKG); L 0–13	Group A 5	Did not advance			14
Leila Niazi	Individual BC3	Dong (CHN); L 0–12	Group A 5	Did not advance			14
Leila Niazi	Individual BC3	Sivapragasam (MAS); W 3–2	Group A 5	Did not advance			14
Hossein Esmaeili	Individual BC4	Kim (KOR); L 4–8	Group A 5	Did not advance			14
Hossein Esmaeili	Individual BC4	Leung (HKG); L 0–9	Group A 5	Did not advance			14
Hossein Esmaeili	Individual BC4	Lim (MAS); L 1–6	Group A 5	Did not advance			14
Hossein Esmaeili	Individual BC4	Bamrungphakdee (THA); L 0–5	Group A 5	Did not advance			14
Maryam Maleki	Individual BC4	Zheng (CHN); L 1–7	Group B 4	Did not advance			12
Maryam Maleki	Individual BC4	Lau (HKG); L 3–6	Group B 4	Did not advance			12
Maryam Maleki	Individual BC4	Ko (TPE); W 6–5	Group B 4	Did not advance			12
Maryam Maleki	Individual BC4	Yoojaroen (THA); L 2–6	Group B 4	Did not advance			12

=== Cycling ===
Men's road

Athlete	Event	Time	Rank
Bahman Golbarnezhad	Road race C4–5	2:12:03	3rd place, bronze medalist(s)

Men's track

Athlete	Event	Qualifying		Final	Rank
Athlete	Event	Time	Rank	Final	Rank
Bahman Golbarnezhad	Individual pursuit C4–5	Disqualified		Did not advance	—

Mixed road

Athlete	Event	Real time	Result	Rank
Mohammad Ebrahimpour	Road race C1–3M & C1–5W	1:44:11		6
Mohammad Ebrahimpour	Individual time trial C1–5	35:44.00	34:33.24	17
Shahab Seyed-Ghaleh	Road race C1–3M & C1–5W	1:44:11		7
Shahab Seyed-Ghaleh	Individual time trial C1–5	38:41.02	35:28.60	19
Bahman Golbarnezhad	Individual time trial C1–5	33:29.99	33:06.27	14
Jamshid Molaei; Behzad Ghorbanloo	Tandem road race	2:22:26		7
Jamshid Molaei; Behzad Ghorbanloo	Tandem individual time trial	32:00.84	32:00.84	6
Behzad Zadaliasghar; Yousef Khalili	Tandem road race	2:17:33		4
Behzad Zadaliasghar; Yousef Khalili	Tandem individual time trial	30:08.82	30:08.82	4

Mixed track

Athlete	Event	Real time	Result	Rank
Mohammad Ebrahimpour	Time trial M1km & W500m C1–5	1:20.518	1:18.488	17
Shahab Seyed-Ghaleh	Time trial M1km & W500m C1–5	1:28.236	1:19.985	19
Bahman Golbarnezhad	Time trial M1km & W500m C1–5	1:17.884	1:17.767	16
Jamshid Molaei; Behzad Ghorbanloo	Tandem 1 km time trial	Did not start		
Behzad Zadaliasghar; Yousef Khalili	Tandem 1 km time trial	Did not start		

Athlete	Event	Qualifying		Final	Rank
Athlete	Event	Time	Rank	Final	Rank
Mohammad Ebrahimpour	Individual pursuit C1–3M & C1–5W	4:17.022	6	Did not advance	6
Shahab Seyed-Ghaleh	Individual pursuit C1–3M & C1–5W	4:40.361	14	Did not advance	14
Jamshid Molaei; Behzad Ghorbanloo	Tandem individual pursuit	5:07.355	4 q	3rd place match Bao (CHN); Sun (CHN); L Overlapped	4
Behzad Zadaliasghar; Yousef Khalili	Tandem individual pursuit	Did not finish		Did not advance	—

=== Football 5-a-side ===
Men

Squad list	Preliminaries		Final	Rank
Squad list	Round robin	Rank	Final	Rank
Morteza Maboudi; Amir Pourrazavi; Kambiz Mohkam; Maghsoud Gholizadeh; Mohammad Reza Jalili; Hamid Shalhavizadeh; Mohammad Heidari; Ahmad Shahhosseini; Hossein Rajabpour; Asghar Rouhi; Coach: Javad Felfeli	Thailand; W 3–0	2 Q	China; L 0–1	2nd place, silver medalist(s)
Morteza Maboudi; Amir Pourrazavi; Kambiz Mohkam; Maghsoud Gholizadeh; Mohammad Reza Jalili; Hamid Shalhavizadeh; Mohammad Heidari; Ahmad Shahhosseini; Hossein Rajabpour; Asghar Rouhi; Coach: Javad Felfeli	South Korea; W 2–0	2 Q	China; L 0–1	2nd place, silver medalist(s)
Morteza Maboudi; Amir Pourrazavi; Kambiz Mohkam; Maghsoud Gholizadeh; Mohammad Reza Jalili; Hamid Shalhavizadeh; Mohammad Heidari; Ahmad Shahhosseini; Hossein Rajabpour; Asghar Rouhi; Coach: Javad Felfeli	Japan; W 2–0	2 Q	China; L 0–1	2nd place, silver medalist(s)
Morteza Maboudi; Amir Pourrazavi; Kambiz Mohkam; Maghsoud Gholizadeh; Mohammad Reza Jalili; Hamid Shalhavizadeh; Mohammad Heidari; Ahmad Shahhosseini; Hossein Rajabpour; Asghar Rouhi; Coach: Javad Felfeli	China; L 1–3	2 Q	China; L 0–1	2nd place, silver medalist(s)

=== Football 7-a-side ===
Men

Squad list	Preliminary		Semifinal	Final	Rank
Squad list	Round robin	Rank	Semifinal	Final	Rank
Mehran Nikouei; Jasem Bakhshi; Hashem Rastegari; Sadegh Hassani; Farzad Mehri; Behnam Sohrabi; Nasser Hosseinifar; Morteza Heidari; Bahman Ansari; Ehsan Gholamhosseinpour; Moslem Akbari; Ardeshir Mahini; Coach: Hossein Saleh	Japan; W 7–0	1 Q	South Korea; W 7–0	China; W 7–0	1st place, gold medalist(s)
Mehran Nikouei; Jasem Bakhshi; Hashem Rastegari; Sadegh Hassani; Farzad Mehri; Behnam Sohrabi; Nasser Hosseinifar; Morteza Heidari; Bahman Ansari; Ehsan Gholamhosseinpour; Moslem Akbari; Ardeshir Mahini; Coach: Hossein Saleh	China; W 8–0	1 Q	South Korea; W 7–0	China; W 7–0	1st place, gold medalist(s)
Mehran Nikouei; Jasem Bakhshi; Hashem Rastegari; Sadegh Hassani; Farzad Mehri; Behnam Sohrabi; Nasser Hosseinifar; Morteza Heidari; Bahman Ansari; Ehsan Gholamhosseinpour; Moslem Akbari; Ardeshir Mahini; Coach: Hossein Saleh	South Korea; W 8–0	1 Q	South Korea; W 7–0	China; W 7–0	1st place, gold medalist(s)

=== Goalball ===
Men

Squad list	Preliminaries		Semifinal	Final	Rank
Squad list	Group B	Rank	Semifinal	Final	Rank
Mehdi Sayyahi; Javad Shirdel; Mohsen Jalilvand; Behzad Jahangiri; Mostafa Shahbazi; Mohammad Soranji; Coach: Mohammad Bidgoli	Jordan; W 11–1	2 Q	China; L 4–13	3rd place match Japan; W 8–2	3rd place, bronze medalist(s)
Mehdi Sayyahi; Javad Shirdel; Mohsen Jalilvand; Behzad Jahangiri; Mostafa Shahbazi; Mohammad Soranji; Coach: Mohammad Bidgoli	Pakistan; W 10–0	2 Q	China; L 4–13	3rd place match Japan; W 8–2	3rd place, bronze medalist(s)
Mehdi Sayyahi; Javad Shirdel; Mohsen Jalilvand; Behzad Jahangiri; Mostafa Shahbazi; Mohammad Soranji; Coach: Mohammad Bidgoli	Iraq; W 4–3	2 Q	China; L 4–13	3rd place match Japan; W 8–2	3rd place, bronze medalist(s)
Mehdi Sayyahi; Javad Shirdel; Mohsen Jalilvand; Behzad Jahangiri; Mostafa Shahbazi; Mohammad Soranji; Coach: Mohammad Bidgoli	South Korea; L 7–9	2 Q	China; L 4–13	3rd place match Japan; W 8–2	3rd place, bronze medalist(s)

Women

Squad list	Round 1	Round 2	Round 3	Round 4	Rank
Saeideh Ghamsari; Tayyebeh Esteki; Maryam Kouhfallah; Maryam Devisti; Samira Jalilvand; Zeinab Ghanbari; Coach: Roghayeh Fatehi	China; L 2–12	Japan; L 0–6	South Korea; W 11–1	Laos; W 12–2	3rd place, bronze medalist(s)

=== Judo ===
Men

Athlete	Event	1/8 final	Quarterfinal	Semifinal	Repechage final	Final	Rank
Saeid Rahmati	66 kg	Bye	Padilla (PHI); W 100–000	Hirose (JPN); W 100–000		Mönkhbat (MGL); W 100–000	1st place, gold medalist(s)
Mohammad Alishanani	73 kg		Khalilov (UZB); L 000–101	Did not advance	Repechage; Al-Haraz (KUW); W 100–000	3rd place match Wong (HKG); W 111–000	3rd place, bronze medalist(s)
Hani Asakereh	81 kg		Atarbayan (MGL); W 100–000	Kosimov (UZB); W 100–001		Kato (JPN); L 001–101	2nd place, silver medalist(s)
Amir Mirhassan Nattaj	90 kg		Raknak (THA); W 100–000	Ganbat (MGL); L 000–000		3rd place match Kasimov (UZB); W 100–000	3rd place, bronze medalist(s)
Hamed Alizadeh	100 kg	Round robin Kaeoka (THA); W 100–000	Round robin Ochirkhuyag (MGL); W 120–000	Round robin Choi (KOR); L 001–100		Round robin Hirose (JPN); W 100–000	2nd place, silver medalist(s)
Hamzeh Nadri	+100 kg	Round robin Wang (CHN); W 001–000	Round robin Srijarung (THA); W 100–000	Round robin Park (KOR); W 001–000		Round robin Looi (MAS); W 120–000	1st place, gold medalist(s)

=== Powerlifting ===
Men

Athlete	Event	Result	Rank
Samad Abbasi	48 kg	150.0	5
Yousef Yousefi	56 kg	175.0	2nd place, silver medalist(s)
Hamzeh Mohammadi	60 kg	197.5	1st place, gold medalist(s)
Nader Moradi	60 kg	195.0	2nd place, silver medalist(s)
Ali Hosseini	67.5 kg	210.0	2nd place, silver medalist(s)
Majid Farzin	75 kg	220.0	1st place, gold medalist(s)
Hamed Solhipour	82.5 kg	215.0	2nd place, silver medalist(s)
Ali Sadeghzadeh	90 kg	205.0	3rd place, bronze medalist(s)
Siamand Rahman	+100 kg	287.5 WR	1st place, gold medalist(s)
Kazem Rajabi	+100 kg	260.0	2nd place, silver medalist(s)

=== Shooting ===
Men

Athlete	Event	Qualification		Final		
Athlete	Event	Score	Rank	Score	Total	Rank
Ramezan Salehnejad	10 m air rifle standing SH1	590	2 Q	104.4	694.4	1st place, gold medalist(s)

Women

Athlete	Event	Qualification		Final		
Athlete	Event	Score	Rank	Score	Total	Rank
Sareh Javanmardi	10 m air pistol SH1	372	3 Q	97.4	469.4	2nd place, silver medalist(s)
Alieh Mahmoudi	10 m air pistol SH1	373	2 Q	93.0	466.0	3rd place, bronze medalist(s)
Azam Rezaei	10 m air rifle standing SH1	391	4 Q	100.2	491.2	3rd place, bronze medalist(s)

Mixed

Athlete	Event	Qualification		Final		
Athlete	Event	Score	Rank	Score	Total	Rank
Hassan Akbari	10 m air rifle prone SH1	595	9	Did not advance		
Hassan Akbari	50 m rifle prone SH1	568	14	Did not advance		
Ramezan Salehnejad	10 m air rifle prone SH1	589	16	Did not advance		
Ramezan Salehnejad	50 m rifle prone SH1	550	19	Did not advance		

=== Sitting volleyball ===
Men

Squad list	Preliminary		Semifinal	Final	Rank
Squad list	Pool B	Rank	Semifinal	Final	Rank
Ramezan Salehi; Mohammad Reza Rahimi; Arash Khormali; Davoud Alipourian; Hadi Sajedinia; Nasser Hassanpour; Majid Lashgari; Jalil Imeri; Ahmad Eiri; Issa Zirahi; Abolfazl Moharramkhani; Meisam Alipour; Coach: Hadi Rezaei	Japan; W 3–0; 25–10, 25–11, 25–13	1 Q	Iraq; W 3–0; 25–18, 25–9, 25–20	China; W 3–1; 20–25, 25–21, 25–21, 25–14	1st place, gold medalist(s)
Ramezan Salehi; Mohammad Reza Rahimi; Arash Khormali; Davoud Alipourian; Hadi Sajedinia; Nasser Hassanpour; Majid Lashgari; Jalil Imeri; Ahmad Eiri; Issa Zirahi; Abolfazl Moharramkhani; Meisam Alipour; Coach: Hadi Rezaei	Myanmar; W 3–0; 25–6, 25–5, 25–9	1 Q	Iraq; W 3–0; 25–18, 25–9, 25–20	China; W 3–1; 20–25, 25–21, 25–21, 25–14	1st place, gold medalist(s)
Ramezan Salehi; Mohammad Reza Rahimi; Arash Khormali; Davoud Alipourian; Hadi Sajedinia; Nasser Hassanpour; Majid Lashgari; Jalil Imeri; Ahmad Eiri; Issa Zirahi; Abolfazl Moharramkhani; Meisam Alipour; Coach: Hadi Rezaei	South Korea; W 3–0; 25–9, 25–10, 25–5	1 Q	Iraq; W 3–0; 25–18, 25–9, 25–20	China; W 3–1; 20–25, 25–21, 25–21, 25–14	1st place, gold medalist(s)

Women

Squad list	Round robin		Semifinal	Final	Rank
Squad list	Round robin	Rank	Semifinal	Final	Rank
Masoumeh Zareei; Zeinab Maleki; Azam Amouei; Zahra Delkhosh; Zahra Gol; Safieh Alighorchi; Nasrin Farhadi; Sakineh Keshvari; Eshrat Kordestani; Tayyebeh Jafari; Mehri Fallahi; Zahra Abdi; Coach: Fariba Soleimani	Mongolia; W 3–0; 25–10, 25–12, 25–16	2 Q	Japan; L 1–3; 22–25, 23–25, 25–21, 29–31	3rd place match Mongolia; W 3–0; 25–11, 25–7, 25–12	3rd place, bronze medalist(s)
Masoumeh Zareei; Zeinab Maleki; Azam Amouei; Zahra Delkhosh; Zahra Gol; Safieh Alighorchi; Nasrin Farhadi; Sakineh Keshvari; Eshrat Kordestani; Tayyebeh Jafari; Mehri Fallahi; Zahra Abdi; Coach: Fariba Soleimani	Pakistan; W 3–0; 25–4, 25–4, 25–1	2 Q	Japan; L 1–3; 22–25, 23–25, 25–21, 29–31	3rd place match Mongolia; W 3–0; 25–11, 25–7, 25–12	3rd place, bronze medalist(s)
Masoumeh Zareei; Zeinab Maleki; Azam Amouei; Zahra Delkhosh; Zahra Gol; Safieh Alighorchi; Nasrin Farhadi; Sakineh Keshvari; Eshrat Kordestani; Tayyebeh Jafari; Mehri Fallahi; Zahra Abdi; Coach: Fariba Soleimani	China; L 0–3; 9–25, 15–25, 13–25	2 Q	Japan; L 1–3; 22–25, 23–25, 25–21, 29–31	3rd place match Mongolia; W 3–0; 25–11, 25–7, 25–12	3rd place, bronze medalist(s)
Masoumeh Zareei; Zeinab Maleki; Azam Amouei; Zahra Delkhosh; Zahra Gol; Safieh Alighorchi; Nasrin Farhadi; Sakineh Keshvari; Eshrat Kordestani; Tayyebeh Jafari; Mehri Fallahi; Zahra Abdi; Coach: Fariba Soleimani	Japan; W 3–0; 26–24, 25–18, 25–23	2 Q	Japan; L 1–3; 22–25, 23–25, 25–21, 29–31	3rd place match Mongolia; W 3–0; 25–11, 25–7, 25–12	3rd place, bronze medalist(s)

=== Swimming ===
Men

Athlete	Event	Time	Rank
Ali Nikoo Hosseinabadi	50 m freestyle S6	38.52	5
Ali Nikoo Hosseinabadi	100 m freestyle S6	1:23.92	3rd place, bronze medalist(s)
Ali Nikoo Hosseinabadi	100 m breaststroke SB5	2:26.73	7
Mehdi Akbarinejad	50 m freestyle S8	32.51	8
Mehdi Akbarinejad	100 m freestyle S8	1:12.03	5
Hassan Ghamkhah	50 m freestyle S9	28.32	4
Hassan Ghamkhah	100 m freestyle S9	1:03.95	4
Hassan Ghamkhah	400 m freestyle S9	5:02.15	4
Hassan Ghamkhah	100 m backstroke S9	1:10.42	4
Hassan Ghamkhah	200 m individual medley SM9	Disqualified	
Reza Azarshab	50 m freestyle S10	29.40	7
Reza Azarshab	100 m backstroke S10	1:12.24	4
Reza Azarshab	100 m butterfly S10	1:08.87	4
Shahin Izadyar	50 m freestyle S10	26.91	1st place, gold medalist(s)
Shahin Izadyar	100 m freestyle S10	1:00.06	1st place, gold medalist(s)
Shahin Izadyar	100 m breaststroke SB9	1:14.94	2nd place, silver medalist(s)
Shahin Izadyar	200 m individual medley SM10	2:32.81	3rd place, bronze medalist(s)
Amin Golmehdi	50 m freestyle S12	33.59	12
Amin Golmehdi	100 m freestyle S12	1:16.57	10
Amin Golmehdi	400 m freestyle S12	6:27.75	11
Amin Golmehdi	100 m backstroke S12	1:31.61	5
Amin Golmehdi	100 m breaststroke SB12	1:31.06	5
Amin Golmehdi	100 m butterfly S13	1:38.71	9
Amin Golmehdi	200 m individual medley SM13	3:16.88	13
Vahid Keshtkar	50 m freestyle S12	29.61	6
Vahid Keshtkar	100 m freestyle S12	1:04.82	3rd place, bronze medalist(s)
Vahid Keshtkar	400 m freestyle S12	5:12.17	1st place, gold medalist(s)
Vahid Keshtkar	100 m backstroke S12	1:24.15	3rd place, bronze medalist(s)
Vahid Keshtkar	100 m breaststroke SB12	1:20.40	2nd place, silver medalist(s)
Vahid Keshtkar	100 m butterfly S13	1:11.58	4
Vahid Keshtkar	200 m individual medley SM13	2:41.30	2nd place, silver medalist(s)
Bahman Shekari	50 m freestyle S12	30.51	7
Bahman Shekari	100 m freestyle S12	1:10.44	6
Bahman Shekari	400 m freestyle S12	5:57.30	5
Bahman Shekari	100 m backstroke S12	1:33.72	6
Bahman Shekari	100 m breaststroke SB12	1:38.08	8
Bahman Shekari	100 m butterfly S13	1:26.44	7
Bahman Shekari	200 m individual medley SM13	3:05.99	10
Mohammad Dalir	50 m freestyle S13	31.96	8
Mohammad Dalir	100 m freestyle S13	1:10.07	6
Mohammad Dalir	100 m backstroke S13	1:23.35	3rd place, bronze medalist(s)
Mohammad Dalir	100 m breaststroke SB13	1:33.55	6
Mohammad Dalir	200 m individual medley SM13	2:58.21	8
Mojtaba Tarval	100 m breaststroke SB5	1:57.65	4
Hassan Ghamkhah; Ali Nikoo Hosseinabadi; Mehdi Akbarinejad; Shahin Izadyar	4 × 100 m freestyle relay 34 pts	4:37.83	3rd place, bronze medalist(s)
Hassan Ghamkhah; Shahin Izadyar; Reza Azarshab; Ali Nikoo Hosseinabadi	4 × 100 m medley relay 34 pts	5:02.70	3rd place, bronze medalist(s)

=== Table tennis ===
Men

Athlete	Event	Preliminary		Quarterfinal	Semifinal	Final	Rank
Athlete	Event	Groups	Rank	Quarterfinal	Semifinal	Final	Rank
Hassan Janfeshan	Singles 1–3	Gao (CHN); L 2–3; 11–2, 7–11, 11–6, 11–13, 9–11	Group B 3	Did not advance			15
Hassan Janfeshan	Singles 1–3	Kim (KOR); L 0–3; 4–11, 6–11, 5–11	Group B 3	Did not advance			15
Ali Khoubizadeh	Singles 1–3	Wu (TPE); L 0–3; 9–11, 9–11, 2–11	Group F 3	Did not advance			15
Ali Khoubizadeh	Singles 1–3	Wichaiwattana (THA); L 2–3; 16–14, 12–10, 4–11, 4–11, 6–11	Group F 3	Did not advance			15
Ali Khoubizadeh	Singles 1–3	Bakr (LIB); W 3–0; 11–1, 11–5, 11–6	Group F 3	Did not advance			15
Hamid Reza Sheikhzadeh	Singles 4	Guo (CHN); L 0–3; 5–11, 7–11, 8–11	Group C 3		Did not advance		9
Hamid Reza Sheikhzadeh	Singles 4	Ko (TPE); L 1–3; 7–11, 3–11, 11–9, 1–11	Group C 3		Did not advance		9
Hamid Reza Sheikhzadeh	Singles 4	Singh (IND); W 3–0; 11–0, 11–8, 11–1	Group C 3		Did not advance		9
Javad Fouladi	Singles 5	Enad (IRQ); W 3–0; 11–6, 11–8, 11–9	Group F 1 Q	Oka (JPN); W 3–0; 15–13, 11–5, 11–9	Kim (KOR); W 3–1; 13–11, 11–13, 11–4, 11–7	Bai (CHN); L 1–3; 8–11, 2–11, 11–6, 4–11	2nd place, silver medalist(s)
Javad Fouladi	Singles 5	Yodyangdeang (THA); W 3–1; 8–11, 12–10, 11–8, 11–8	Group F 1 Q	Oka (JPN); W 3–0; 15–13, 11–5, 11–9	Kim (KOR); W 3–1; 13–11, 11–13, 11–4, 11–7	Bai (CHN); L 1–3; 8–11, 2–11, 11–6, 4–11	2nd place, silver medalist(s)
Javad Fouladi	Singles 5	Mudani (INA); W 3–1; 11–13, 11–5, 17–15, 12–10	Group F 1 Q	Oka (JPN); W 3–0; 15–13, 11–5, 11–9	Kim (KOR); W 3–1; 13–11, 11–13, 11–4, 11–7	Bai (CHN); L 1–3; 8–11, 2–11, 11–6, 4–11	2nd place, silver medalist(s)
Hassan Janfeshan; Ali Khoubizadeh	Team 1–3	South Korea; L 0–3; 0–2, 1–2, 1–2	Group A 3	Did not advance			7
Hassan Janfeshan; Ali Khoubizadeh	Team 1–3	Thailand; L 0–3; 0–2, 0–2, 1–2	Group A 3	Did not advance			7
Javad Fouladi; Hamid Reza Sheikhzadeh	Team 4–5	Japan; W 3–2; 1–2, 0–2, 2–1, 2–0, 2–0	Group C 2 Q	Thailand; W 3–0; 2–1, 2–0, 2–1	South Korea; L 1–3; 0–2, 0–2, 2–1, 0–2	3rd place match Chinese Taipei; L 0–3; 0–2, 1–2, 0–2	4
Javad Fouladi; Hamid Reza Sheikhzadeh	Team 4–5	Saudi Arabia; W 3–0; 2–0, 2–0, 2–0	Group C 2 Q	Thailand; W 3–0; 2–1, 2–0, 2–1	South Korea; L 1–3; 0–2, 0–2, 2–1, 0–2	3rd place match Chinese Taipei; L 0–3; 0–2, 1–2, 0–2	4
Javad Fouladi; Hamid Reza Sheikhzadeh	Team 4–5	Chinese Taipei; L 0–3; 0–2, 0–2, 1–2	Group C 2 Q	Thailand; W 3–0; 2–1, 2–0, 2–1	South Korea; L 1–3; 0–2, 0–2, 2–1, 0–2	3rd place match Chinese Taipei; L 0–3; 0–2, 1–2, 0–2	4

Women

Athlete	Event	Preliminary		Quarterfinal	Semifinal	Final	Rank
Athlete	Event	Groups	Rank	Quarterfinal	Semifinal	Final	Rank
Forough Bakhtiari	Singles 1–3	Chan (HKG); W 3–1; 11–6, 11–7, 7–11, 11–7	Group A 2		Did not advance		5
Forough Bakhtiari	Singles 1–3	Li (CHN); L 0–3; 4–11, 4–11, 4–11	Group A 2		Did not advance		5
Forough Bakhtiari	Singles 1–3	Nath (BAN); W 3–0; 11–4, 11–2, 11–3	Group A 2		Did not advance		5
Elham Chazani	Singles 1–3	Patel (IND); W 3–0; 11–7, 11–9, 11–3	Group B 2		Did not advance		5
Elham Chazani	Singles 1–3	Bespalaya (KAZ); W 3–0; 11–6, 11–1, 11–3	Group B 2		Did not advance		5
Elham Chazani	Singles 1–3	Jung (KOR); L 0–3; 4–11, 2–11, 5–11	Group B 2		Did not advance		5
Narges Hamidi	Singles 10	Yang (CHN); L 0–3; 4–11, 5–11, 6–11	Group A 2 Q	Liu (CHN); L 0–3; 6–11, 3–11, 3–11	Did not advance		5
Narges Hamidi	Singles 10	Viet (VIE); W 3–0; 11–8, 14–12, 11–8	Group A 2 Q	Liu (CHN); L 0–3; 6–11, 3–11, 3–11	Did not advance		5
Somayyeh Mostafavi	Singles 10	Liu (CHN); L 0–3; 5–11, 5–11, 3–11	Group C 2 Q	Zhou (CHN); L 0–3; 5–11, 7–11, 6–11	Did not advance		5
Somayyeh Mostafavi	Singles 10	da Costa (TLS); W 3–0; 11–4, 11–4, 11–3	Group C 2 Q	Zhou (CHN); L 0–3; 5–11, 7–11, 6–11	Did not advance		5
Somayyeh Mostafavi	Singles 10	Lee (KOR); W 3–0; 11–9, 11–7, 12–10	Group C 2 Q	Zhou (CHN); L 0–3; 5–11, 7–11, 6–11	Did not advance		5
Forough Bakhtiari; Elham Chazani	Team 1–3	Round robin Thailand; L 1–3; 0–2, 0–2, 2–1, 0–2		Round robin China; L 0–3; 0–2, 0–2, 0–2	Round robin South Korea; W 3–2; 0–2, 2–0, 2–1, 0–2, 2–0	Round robin Hong Kong; W 3–2; 0–2, 2–0, 2–0, 0–2, 2–0	3rd place, bronze medalist(s)
Narges Hamidi; Somayyeh Mostafavi	Team 6–10	South Korea; L 0–3; 0–2, 0–2, 1–2	Group B 3		Did not advance		5
Narges Hamidi; Somayyeh Mostafavi	Team 6–10	Philippines; L 1–3; 2–0, 0–2, 1–2, 0–2	Group B 3		Did not advance		5

=== Wheelchair tennis ===
Men

Athlete	Event	1st round	2nd round	Quarterfinal	Semifinal	Final	Rank
Hossein Mamipour	Singles	Durai (IND); W 2–0; 6–0, 6–0	Kruamai (THA); L 0–2; 1–6, 2–6	Did not advance			9
Mohammad Yaghoubi	Singles	Rajakaruna (SRI); L 0–2; 6–7, 0–6	Did not advance	17th–23rd places Subramanian (IND); W 2–0; 6–0, 6–3	17th–20th places Kee (MAS); W 2–0; 6–3, 6–0	17th place match Perera (SRI); W 2–0; 6–2, 6–4	17
Hossein Mamipour; Mohammad Yaghoubi	Doubles		Feng (CHN); Wei (CHN); L 1–2; 6–4, 5–7, 4–6	Did not advance			9
