= Athletics at the 2010 Asian Para Games =

Athletics at the 2010 Asian Para Games were held in Aoti Main Stadium from December 14 to December 19. There were 120 gold medals in this sport.

== Classification ==
Athletes are given a classification depending on the type and extent of their disability. The classification system allows athletes to compete against others with a similar level of function.

The athletics classifications are:

- 11–13: Blind athletes
- 32–38: Athletes with cerebral palsy
- 40: Les Autres (others) (including people with dwarfism)
- 42–46: Amputees
- 51–58: Athletes with a spinal cord disability

The class numbers are given prefixes of "T", "F" and "P" for track, field and pentathlon events, respectively.

== Medal summary ==
=== Medal table ===
Rank	Nation	Gold	Silver	Bronze	Total
1	China (CHN)	69	50	32	151
2	Iran (IRI)	14	10	10	34
3	Thailand (THA)	10	17	13	40
4	Japan (JPN)	5	5	9	19
5	Iraq (IRQ)	5	4	2	11
6	United Arab Emirates (UAE)	4	5	1	10
7	South Korea (KOR)	2	4	4	10
8	Pakistan (PAK)	2	1	1	4
9	Jordan (JOR)	2	0	1	3
10	India (IND)	1	4	2	7
11	Malaysia (MAS)	1	3	6	10
12	Saudi Arabia (KSA)	1	3	1	5
13	Bahrain (BRN)	1	2	0	3
14	Uzbekistan (UZB)	1	1	2	4
15	Sri Lanka (SRI)	1	0	5	6
16	Palestine (PLE)	1	0	1	2
17	Vietnam (VIE)	0	3	5	8
18	Brunei (BRU)	0	2	2	4
19	Chinese Taipei (TPE)	0	2	1	3
19	Hong Kong (HKG)	0	2	1	3
21	Philippines (PHI)	0	1	2	3
21	Syria (SYR)	0	1	2	3
23	Kuwait (KUW)	0	1	0	1
24	Indonesia (INA)	0	0	3	3
25	Kazakhstan (KAZ)	0	0	2	2
26	Mongolia (MGL)	0	0	1	1
26	Qatar (QAT)	0	0	1	1
Totals (27 entries)		120	121	110	351

=== Men's events ===
Event	Class	Gold	Silver	Bronze
100 m	100 m T11	Kitsana Jorchuy; Thailand	Wu Xiang; China	Jakkit Punthong; Thailand
100 m	100 m T12	Li Yansong; China	Mohd Hisham Khaironi; Malaysia	Amnat Wongngoen; Thailand
100 m	100 m T13	Yuan Yizhi; China	Jirawat Misuk; Thailand	Songwut Lamsan; Thailand
100 m	100 m T36	Che Mian; China	So Wa Wai; Hong Kong	Xu Ran; China
100 m	100 m T37	Ma Yuxi; China	Yang Sen; China	Nguyen Huu Thinh; Vietnam
100 m	100 m T38	Zhou Wenjun; China	Yang Chen; China	Haider Ali; Pakistan
100 m	100 m T42	Atsushi Yamamoto; Japan	Tawatchai Morapat; Thailand	Balwan Singh; India
100 m	100 m T44	Jia Tianlei; China	Shang Junfeng; China	Dumeera Pituwalakankanange; Sri Lanka
100 m	100 m T46	Zhao Xu; China	Saeed Al-Khaldi; Saudi Arabia	He Wei; China
100 m	100 m T53	Sopa Intasen; Thailand	Li Huzhao; China	Jeong Dong-Ho; South Korea
100 m	100 m T54	Supachai Koysub; Thailand	Saichon Konjen; Thailand	Zong Kai; China
200 m	200 m T11	Kitsana Jorchuy; Thailand	Wu Xiang; China	Hidetoshi Suzuki; Japan
200 m	200 m T12	Mohd Hisham Khaironi; Malaysia	Shinichi Shirota; Japan	Suhib Mraisi; Jordan
200 m	200 m T13	Yuan Yizhi; China	Songwut Lamsan; Thailand	Som-Dech Chaiya; Thailand
200 m	200 m T36	Che Mian; China	So Wa Wai; Hong Kong	Xu Ran; China
200 m	200 m T37	Ma Yuxi; China	Yang Sen; China	Zhu Lei; China
200 m	200 m T38	Zhou Wenjun; China	Yang Chen; China	Suyono; Indonesia
200 m	200 m T44	Keita Sato; Japan	Suthis Uamsamut; Thailand	Jun Haruta; Japan
200 m	200 m T46	Fadhil Al-Dabbagh; Iraq	Guo Ni; China	He Haican; China
200 m	200 m T53	Li Huzhao; China	Yoo Byung-Hoon; South Korea	Sopa Intasen; Thailand
200 m	200 m T54	Supachai Koysub; Thailand	Saichon Konjen; Thailand	Cui Yanfeng; China
400 m	400 m T11	Kitsana Jorchuy; Thailand	le Duc Hung; Vietnam	Dao van Cuong; Vietnam
400 m	400 m T12	Li Yansong; China	Suphachai Songphinit; Thailand	Shinichi Shirota; Japan
400 m	400 m T13	Husseein Kadhim; Iraq	Ahmadreza Kazemi; Iran	Yuan Yizhi; China
400 m	400 m T36	Che Mian; China	Huang Kefeng; China	Luo Hongxing; China
400 m	400 m T38	Zhou Wenjun; China	Yang Chen; China	Suyono; Indonesia
400 m	400 m T44	Mudassar Baig; Pakistan	Chen Mao; China	Jun Haruta; Japan
400 m	400 m T46	Pradeep Uggl Dena Pathirannehelag; Sri Lanka	Sandeep Singh Maan; India	Roger Tapia; Philippines
400 m	400 m T53	Li Huzhao; China	Yoo Byung-Hoon; South Korea	Jun Hiromichi; Japan
400 m	400 m T54	Liu Chengming; China	Saichon Konjen; Thailand	Cui Yanfeng; China
800 m	800 m T12	Alisher Usmonov; Uzbekistan	Hassan Asgari; Iran	Islam Salimov; Kazakhstan
800 m	800 m T13	Husseein Kadhim; Iraq	Ramkiaran Singh; India	Munkhbat Gantumur; Mongolia
800 m	800 m T36	Chen Jie; China	Huang Kefeng; China	Liu Hua; China
800 m	800 m T46	Abbas Dayani Asl; Iran	Mazin Al-Dosari; Saudi Arabia	Lalith Mihindukulasooriya; Sri Lanka
800 m	800 m T53	Hong Suk-Man; South Korea	Jun Hiromichi; Japan	Sopa Intasen; Thailand
800 m	800 m T54	Cui Yanfeng; China	Liu Yang; China	Ampai Sualuang; Thailand
1500 m	1500 m T11	Zhang Zhen; China	Husam Shehab; Bahrain	
1500 m	1500 m T37	Guo Haiqun; China	Yang Fugui; China	
1500 m	1500 m T46	Abbas Dayani Asl; Iran	Isidro Vildosola; Philippines	Ahmad Rafee Arifin; Malaysia
1500 m	1500 m T54	Prawat Wahoram; Thailand	Khachonsak Thamsophon; Thailand	Nobukazu Hanaoka; Japan
5000 m	5000 m T12	Qi Shun; China	Tadashi Horikoshi; Japan	Ali Elahi; Iran
5000 m	5000 m T54	Prawat Wahoram; Thailand	Ampai Sualuang; Thailand	Kota Hokinoue; Japan
Marathon	Marathon T54	Kota Hokinoue; Japan	Masayuki Higuchi; Japan	Prawat Wahoram; Thailand
4 × 100 m relay	4 × 100 m T11–T13	Thailand (THA); Kitsana Jorchuy; Songwut Lamsan; Suphachai Songphinit; Amnat Wongngoen	China (CHN); Li Yansong; Wu Xiang; Yuan Yizhi; Zhao Hongbo	Uzbekistan (UZB); Abror Ibrokhimov; Bekzod Khodjaev; Miran Sahatov; Rustamjon Temirov
4 × 100 m relay	4 × 100 m T35–T38	China (CHN); Che Mian; Ma Yuxi; Yang Chen; Zhou Wenjun	Malaysia (MAS); Muhammad Hafiz Abu Bakar; Mohd Raduan Emeari; Krishna Kumar Hari Das; Amir Firdauss Jamaluddin	Iraq (IRQ); Younus Abdulhussein; Hassan Al-Anbaky; Mahmood Al-Saadi; Ammar Al-Swaiedi
4 × 100 m relay	4 × 100 m T42–T46	China (CHN); Guo Ni; He Wei; Jia Tianlei; Shang Junfeng	Thailand (THA); Angcan Chanaboon; Suthis Uamsamut; Somdee Wannagammiko; Sutat Yamee	Japan (JPN); Jun Haruta; Keita Sato; Toru Suzuki; Tomoki Tagawa
4 × 100 m relay	4 × 100 m T53–T54	China (CHN); Cui Yanfeng; Li Huzhao; Liu Chengming; Liu Yang	Thailand (THA); Sopa Intasen; Saichon Konjen; Supachai Koysub; Prawat Wahoram	South Korea (KOR); Hong Suk-Man; Jeong Dong-Ho; Lee Ki-Hak; Yoo Byung-Hoon
High jump	High jump F42	Guo Weizhong; China	Li Xiaowen; China; Lin Xiangti; China	
High jump	High jump F46	Chen Hongjie; China	Angcan Chanaboon; Thailand	Nishantha Senevirathnage; Sri Lanka
Long jump	Long jump F11	Li Duan; China	Jakkit Punthong; Thailand	Nguyen Anh Tuan; Vietnam
Long jump	Long jump F13	Mohammed Fannouna; Palestine	Songwut Lamsan; Thailand	Doniyor Saliev; Uzbekistan
Long jump	Long jump F36	Xu Ran; China	Feng Hong; China	
Long jump	Long jump F37–38	Haider Ali; Pakistan	Ma Yuxi; China	Amanat Kalkayev; Kazakhstan
Long jump	Long jump F44	Wang Qiuhong; China	Shang Junfeng; China	Dumeera Pituwalakankanange; Sri Lanka
Long jump	Long jump F46	Fadhil Al-Dabbagh; Iraq	Jagseer Singh; India	Setiyo Budihartanto; Indonesia
Triple jump	Triple jump F12	Zhao Hongbo; China	Liang Keng Chin; Chinese Taipei	Jiang Zhiping; China
Triple jump	Triple jump F46	Jagseer Singh; India	Fadhil Al-Dabbagh; Iraq	Hiroyuki Yasui; Japan
Club throw	Club throw F31/32/51	Park Se-Ho; South Korea	Ayman Al-Heddi; Bahrain	Mohammed Hadi Al-Joaidi; Qatar
Discus throw	Discus throw F11	Manop Takhiankham; Thailand	Hameed Hassain; Iraq	Bae Yu-Dong; South Korea
Discus throw	Discus throw F32-34	Hani Al-Nakhli; Saudi Arabia	Jalal Khakzadiyeh; Iran	Siamak Saleh Farajzadeh; Iran
Discus throw	Discus throw F35-36	Wang Wenbo; China	Guo Wei; China	Li Yancang; China
Discus throw	Discus throw F37–38	Javad Hardani; Iran	Zhang Xuelong; China	Shi Lei; China
Discus throw	Discus throw F42	Mehrdad Karamzadeh; Iran	Wang Lezheng; China	Bassam Sawsan; Syria
Discus throw	Discus throw F44	Farzad Sepahvand; Iran	Guan Xiqiang; China	Gao Mingjie; China
Discus throw	Discus throw F51–53	Mohammad Yaseen; Jordan	Amit Kumar; India	
Discus throw	Discus throw F54–56	Issa Al-Jahwari; United Arab Emirates	Mohammadali Malekpour; Iran	Jalil Bagheri Jeddi; Iran
Discus throw	Discus throw F57–58	Javid Ehsani Shakib; Iran	Mehdi Moradi; Iran	Cao Ngoc Hung; Vietnam
Javelin throw	Javelin throw F13	Seyed Erfan Hosseini Liravi; Iran	Chiang Chih Chung; Chinese Taipei	Sajad Nikparast; Iran
Javelin throw	Javelin throw F33–34	Siamak Saleh Farajzadeh; Iran	Mohammad Al-Mehairi; United Arab Emirates	Hani Al-Nakhli; Saudi Arabia
Javelin throw	Javelin throw F35–36	Guo Wei; China	Mohsen Kaedi; Iran	Li Yancang; China
Javelin throw	Javelin throw F37–38	Zhang Xuelong; China	Muhammad Awais; Pakistan	Javad Hardani; Iran
Javelin throw	Javelin throw F42	Kamran Shokrisalari; Iran	Fu Yanlong; China	Satian Thongdee; Thailand
Javelin throw	Javelin throw F44	Gao Mingjie; China	Gao Changlong; China	Ali Omidi; Iran
Javelin throw	Javelin throw F54–56	Ali Naderi Darbaghshay; Iran	Haji Juma At Shari; Brunei	Haji Abdul Kadir Hirdan; Brunei
Javelin throw	Javelin throw F57–58	Xu Chongyao; China	Mohamad Mohamad; Syria	Sakchai Yimbanchang; Thailand
Shot put	Shot put F12	Mahdi Al-Saadi; Iraq	Hameed Hassain; Iraq	Lee Sheng Chow; Malaysia
Shot put	Shot put F32–33	Hassan Malaleih; United Arab Emirates	Hani Al-Nakhli; Saudi Arabia	Park Se-Ho; South Korea
Shot put	Shot put F34	Salman Abbariki; Iran	Mohammad Al-Mehairi; United Arab Emirates	Siamak Saleh Farajzadeh; Iran
Shot put	Shot put F37–38	Ahmed Meshaima; Bahrain	Khusniddin Norbekov; Uzbekistan	Zhang Xuelong; China
Shot put	Shot put F40	Xia Zhiwei; China	Wildan Nukhailawi; Iraq	Kovan Abdulraheem; Iraq
Shot put	Shot put F42	Farhad Raiga; Iran	Mahdi Asghari; Iran	Wang Lezheng; China
Shot put	Shot put F44/46	Wei Enlong; China	Gong Xiufeng; China	Guan Xiqiang; China
Shot put	Shot put F54–56	Jalil Bagheri Jeddi; Iran	Trinh Cong Luan; Vietnam	Khamis Zqout; Palestine
Shot put	Shot put F57–58	Jamil Elshebli; Jordan	Mehdi Moradi; Iran	Mohamad Mohamad; Syria

=== Women's events ===
Event	Class	Gold	Silver	Bronze
100 m	100 m T11	Wu Chunmiao; China	Jia Juntingxian; China	Chen Yan; China
100 m	100 m T12	Zhu Daqing; China	Yusof An Nur Haiyyu; Brunei	
100 m	100 m T13	Uran Sawada; Japan	Supannee Prawat; Thailand	Liu Ya Ting; Chinese Taipei
100 m	100 m T36	Wang Fang; China	Jeon Min-Jae; South Korea	Yu Chun Lai; Hong Kong
100 m	100 m T38	Xiong Dezhi; China	Liu Xiumei; China	Norsyazwani Abdullah; Malaysia
100 m	100 m T44	Wang Juan; China	Saki Takakuwa; Japan	Liao Mulan; China
100 m	100 m T46	Wang Yanping; China	Ouyang Jingling; China	Jiraporn Wongsuwan; Thailand
100 m	100 m T53	Huang Lisha; China	Nguyen Thi Thanh Thao; Vietnam	Zhou Hongzhuan; China
100 m	100 m T54	Zhang Ting; China	Liu Wenjun; China	Dong Hongjiao; China
200 m	200 m T11	Yuki Temma; Japan	Liu Cuiqing; China	Anne Grace Abeto; Philippines
200 m	200 m T12	Wang Yuqin; China	Xu Jiping; China	
200 m	200 m T36	Wang Fang; China	Jeon Min-Jae; South Korea	Liu Ping; China
200 m	200 m T38	Xiong Dezhi; China	Liu Xiumei; China	Norsyazwani Abdullah; Malaysia
200 m	200 m T46	Wang Yanping; China	Ouyang Jingling; China	Kumudu Dissanayake Mudiyanselage; Sri Lanka
200 m	200 m T53	Huang Lisha; China	Zhou Hongzhuan; China	Nguyen Thi Thanh Thao; Vietnam
200 m	200 m T54	Zhang Ting; China	Li Yingjie; China	Zou Lihong; China
400 m	400 m T12	Wang Yuqin; China	Xie Hongying; China	
400 m	400 m T13	Zhu Daqing; China	Supannee Prawat; Thailand	Zheng Jin; China
400 m	400 m T53	Zhou Hongzhuan; China	Huang Lisha; China	Lu Fan; China
Long jump	Long jump F44/46	Ouyang Jingling; China	Wang Juan; China	Jiraporn Wongsuwan; Thailand
Discus throw	Discus throw F12	Tang Hongxia; China	Hemala Devi Eni Kutty; Malaysia	Awg Haji Mataha Dyg Nor Hensan; Brunei
Discus throw	Discus throw F35-36	Bao Jiongyu; China	Wu Qing; China	
Discus throw	Discus throw F37	Mi Na; China	Jia Qianqian; China	Xu Qiuping; China
Discus throw	Discus throw F54–56	Dong Feixia; China	Chen Liping; China	Law King Kiew; Malaysia
Discus throw	Discus throw F57–58	Li Ling; China	Siham Al-Rasheedy; United Arab Emirates	Fatemeh Montazeri Ghahjaverestani; Iran
Javelin throw	Javelin throw F33/34/52/53	Thuraya Al-Zaabi; United Arab Emirates	Aishah Bani Khaled; United Arab Emirates	Deepa Malik; India
Javelin throw	Javelin throw F37–38	Jia Qianqian; China	Mi Na; China	Xu Qiuping; China
Javelin throw	Javelin throw F46	Zhao Hongmei; China	Maryam Matroushi; United Arab Emirates	Surang Khamsuk; Thailand
Javelin throw	Javelin throw F54–56	Marziyeh Sedghi Saghinsara; Iran	Leila Malaki; Iran	Dong Feixia; China
Shot put	Shot put F12	Zhang Liangmin; China	Tang Hongxia; China	Hemala Devi Eni Kutty; Malaysia
Shot put	Shot put F32–34	Thuraya Al-Zaabi; United Arab Emirates	Maha Al-Sheraian; Kuwait	Aishah Bani Khaled; United Arab Emirates
Shot put	Shot put F35–36	Wu Qing; China	Bao Jiongyu; China	
Shot put	Shot put F37	Mi Na; China	Jia Qianqian; China	Xu Qiuping; China
Shot put	Shot put F42/44/46	Jin Yajuan; China	Yang Yue; China	Yao Juan; China
Shot put	Shot put F54–56	Dong Feixia; China	Marziyeh Sedghi Saghinsara; Iran	Leila Malaki; Iran
Shot put	Shot put F57–58	Li Ling; China	Gao Leilei; China	Fatemeh Montazeri Ghahjaverestani; Iran

== See also ==
- Athletics at the 2010 Asian Games
