= Qatar at the 2010 Asian Para Games =

- IOC code: QAT
- NOC: Qatar Paralympic Committee
- Competitors: 11 in 4 sports
- Medals Ranked 30th: Gold 0 Silver 0 Bronze 1 Total 1

Asian Para Games appearances
- 2010; 2014; 2018; 2022; 2026

Qatar participated in the 2010 Asian Para Games, the first multi-sport event for athletes with a physical disability to run parallel to an edition of the Asian Games. It was held two weeks after the conclusion of the 2010 Asian Games in Guangzhou, China, from 13 to 19 December 2010.

Qatar won a single bronze medal and finished in thirtieth place in the medal table, tied with Myanmar.

== Disability classifications ==
All general rules and guidelines of the Asian Paralympic Committee (APC) are consistent with the rules and norms of the International Paralympic Committee (IPC). According to APC, all the sports in the Asian Para Games must follow the rules of the IPC.

"All competitors shall be eligible to be classified in the classification of sports rules of relevant sports established by International Sport Federations of sports and IPC"

As in the Paralympic Games, every participant at the Asian Para Games was grouped into one of five categories according to their disability: amputation, cerebral palsy, wheelchair athletes, visual impairment, and les autres, any physical disability that does not fall under one of the other categories. Each Asian Para Games sport then has its own classifications, dependent upon the specific physical demands of competition.

== Competitors ==
The Qatari delegation included eleven athletes, all male, participating in four different sports. Qatar had sent 64 women to take part in the Asian Games, but in this Games it was the one of three nations that sent no female athlete, the other two being Saudi Arabia, which has an only-men policy in sports, and Palestine.^{[a]} The athletics contingent was the largest, with seven athletes.

Sport	Men	Women	Total
Athletics	7	0	7
Boccia	2	0	2
Powerlifting	1	0	1
Table tennis	1	0	1
Total	11	0	11

== Medalist ==
Mohammed Hadi Aljoaidi, a club thrower, was the only Qatari athlete who succeeded in winning a medal. He won a bronze medal with his personal best in the men's club throw - F31/32/51 event of athletics, held on 17 December 2010 in the Aoti Main Stadium, a main venue of the Games.

== Results by event ==
=== Athletics ===
Men—Field

Athlete	Events	class	1	2	3	4	5	6	Best	Rank
Mohammed Hadi Aljoaidi	Men's Club Throw – F31/32/51	F51	14.23 m 329 pts	14.03 m 316 pts	13.95 m 310 pts	14.42 m 341 pts	14.31 m 334 pts	14.85 m 369 pts	14.85 m 369 pts	Bronze medal
Omar Saleh M A Al Yazidi	Men's Discus Throw – F32/33/34	F33	10.26 m 325 pts	11.98 m 442 pts	11.82 m 432 pts				11.98 m 442 pts	14
Omran Mohd Sh A Al Maadhadi	Men's Discus Throw – F42	F42	23.64 m	19.01 m	22.00 m				23.64 m	10
Nasser Saed K Al Sahoti	Men's Discus Throw – F57/58	F58	42.52 m 692 pts	37.04 m 551 pts	36.77 m 544 pts				42.52 m 692 pts	11
Ali Mohd A Almass	Men's Discus Throw – F57/58	F57	31.91 m 657 pts	32.73 m 680 pts	33.61 m 703 pts				33.61 m 703 pts	10
Abdulrahman Qassim Q Y Ahmad	Men's Javelin Throw – F54/55/56	F55	×	13.23 m 269 pts	12.37 m 208 pts				13.23 m 269 pts	11
Nasser Saed K Al Sahoti	Men's Javelin Throw – F57/58	F58	38.69 m 791 pts	39.26 m 805 pts	39.13 m 802 pts	36.22 m 728 pts	36.63 m 739 pts	37.92 m 772 pts	39.26 m 805 pts	8
Omran Mohd Sh A AL Maadhadi	Men's Shot Put – F42	F42	7.56 m	8.49 m	8.59				8.59	9
Salah Ismail S M Aladsani	Men's Shot Put – F57/58	F58	10.71 m 614pts	10.51 m 594pts	10.52 m 595pts	10.75 m 618pts	10.90 m 633pts	10.86 m 629pts	10.90 m 633pts	8
Ali Mohd A Almass	Men's Shot Put – F57/58	F57	9.42 m 561pts	9.55 m 576pts	9.35 m 553pts				9.55 m 576pts	10

=== Boccia ===
Athlete	Event	Group matches		Quarterfinals	Semifinals	Final	
Athlete	Event	Opposition Result	Rank	Opposition Result	Opposition Result	Opposition Result	Rank
Mohd Salem M A Al Marri	Individual – BC2	Jitsa-Ngiem (THA); L 0–21 Yan (CHN); L 0–20; Ho (TPE); L 0–9; Sohn (KOR); L 1–13	5	did not advance			
Mohammed Faraj Al Marri	Individual – BC2	Jeong (KOR); L 0–22 Vongsa (THA); L 0–20; Goh (SIN); L 3–7; Tan (SIN); L 1–5	5	did not advance			

=== Powerlifting ===
In powerlifting, Qatar sent only one athlete– Ali Abdulla M A Mohamed, who participated in the +100 category. Mohamed did not lift any weight due to DNS (Did Not Start). In this event, Siamand Rahman of Iran broke the world record after lifting a total weight of 290 kg.

=== Table tennis ===
Athlete	Event	Preliminary		Quarterfinal	Semifinal	Final	Rank
Athlete	Event	Groups	Rank	Quarterfinal	Semifinal	Final	Rank
Hassan Adnan H Al Sharif	Singles TT 4	Lin (TPE); L 0–3; 2–11, 4–11, 4–11	Group D 3	Did not advance			15
Hassan Adnan H Al Sharif	Singles TT 4	Kim (KOR); L 2–3; 2–11, 3–11, 4–11	Group D 3	Did not advance			15
Hassan Adnan H Al Sharif	Singles TT 4	de Araujo (TLS); W 3–0; 11–4, 13–11, 11–4	Group D 3	Did not advance			15

== Notes and references ==
Notes

- ^{a} All other NPCs sent at least one woman athlete, out of which only six NPCs failed to achieve any medal in an any women's event.

== Bibliography ==
- "APC Handbook – General Provision of the Games" (PDF). APC. Archived from the original (pdf) on 20 July 2011.
