= Powerlifting at the 2010 Asian Para Games =

Paralympic Powerlifting at the 2010 Asian Para Games
- Location: Guangzhou, China

Powerlifting at the 2010 Asian Para Games was held in Asian Games Town Gymnasium, Guangzhou, China from December 13 to 18, 2010.

== Medal summary ==
=== Medal table ===
Rank	Nation	Gold	Silver	Bronze	Total
1	China (CHN)	11	3	2	16
2	Iran (IRI)	3	5	1	9
3	Iraq (IRQ)	3	1	3	7
4	Thailand (THA)	1	2	1	4
5	Jordan (JOR)	1	0	1	2
6	Chinese Taipei (TPE)	1	0	0	1
7	Syria (SYR)	0	3	1	4
8	Malaysia (MAS)	0	2	2	4
9	Philippines (PHI)	0	2	0	2
10	Saudi Arabia (KSA)	0	1	0	1
10	United Arab Emirates (UAE)	0	1	0	1
12	South Korea (KOR)	0	0	2	2
12	Turkmenistan (TKM)	0	0	2	2
12	Vietnam (VIE)	0	0	2	2
15	India (IND)	0	0	1	1
15	Kazakhstan (KAZ)	0	0	1	1
Totals (16 entries)		20	20	19	59

=== Medalists ===
==== Men ====
Event	Gold	Silver	Bronze
-48 kg	Omar Qarada; Jordan	Mustafa Radhi; Syria	Farman Basha; India
-52 kg	Hussein Juboori; Iraq	Choochat Sukjarern; Thailand	Wang Jian; China
-56 kg	Rasool Mohsin; Iraq	Seyed Yousef Yousefi Pashaki; Iran	Narong Kasanun; Thailand
-60 kg	Hamzeh Mohammadi; Iran	Nader Moradi; Iran	Yang Quanxi; China
-67.50 kg	Liu Lei; China	Ali Hosseini; Iran	Sergey Meladze; Turkmenistan
-75 kg	Majid Farzin; Iran	Hu Peng; China	Mariappan Perumal; Malaysia
-82.50 kg	Gu Xiaofei; China	Hamed Solhipour; Iran	Thaer Al-Ali; Iraq
-90 kg	Cai Huichao; China	Mohammed Khamis Khalaf; United Arab Emirates	Ali Sadeghzadeh; Iran
-100 kg	Tian Pingguang; China	Bassam Al-Hawal; Saudi Arabia	Hamdo Sallat; Syria
+100 kg	Siamand Rahman; Iran	Kazem Rajabi Golojeh; Iran	Faris Al-Ajeeli; Iraq

==== Women ====
Event	Gold	Silver	Bronze
-40 kg	Fu Tiecan; China	Noura Baddour; Syria	Nguyen Thi Hong; Vietnam
-44 kg	Cui Zhe; China	Achelle Guion; Philippines	Kabira Askarova; Kazakhstan
-48 kg	Shi Shanshan; China	Xiao Cuijuan; China	Shin Jeong-Hee; South Korea
-52 kg	Wang Hongchan; China	Fatema Alhasan; Syria	Dinh Thi Nga; Vietnam
-56 kg	Yang Yan; China	Somkhoun Anon; Thailand	Dhikra Saleem; Iraq
-60 kg	Cui Jianjin; China	Siow Lee Chan; Malaysia	Mayagozel Pekieva; Turkmenistan
-67.50 kg	Arawan Bootpo; Thailand	Wang Zhiping; China	Fatimah Wagimin; Malaysia
-75 kg	Lin Tzu-hui; Chinese Taipei	Rasha Alshikh; Syria	Tharwh Alhajaj; Jordan
-82.50 kg	Huda Ali; Iraq	Sharifah Raudzah Syed Akil; Malaysia	No award
+82.50 kg	Li Fengmei; China	Adeline Dumapong; Philippines	Lee Hyun-Jung; South Korea
