= Wheelchair basketball at the 2010 Asian Para Games =

- Venue: Guangyao Gymnasium
- Location: Guangzhou, China
- Dates: 13–18 December

Medalists
gold medal	Japan (men); Japan (women)
silver medal	China (men); China (women)
bronze medal	South Korea (men)

Wheelchair basketball at the 2010 Asian Para Games were held in Guangyao Gymnasium from 13 to 18 December. There were two gold medals in this sport.

== Medalists ==
Event	Gold	Silver	Bronze
Men's team	Japan (JPN) Shingo Fujii; Tomomi Masubuchi; Kazuyuki Tokairin; Masatsugu Shinoda; Satoshi Sato; Satoru Sakamoto; Kazuyuki Kyoya; Akira Toyoshima; Fumiaki Shiromaru; Tetsuya Miyajima; Daisuke Tsuchiko; Reo Fujimoto; Coach: Yoshiaki Iwasa	China (CHN) Chen Guojun; Huang Xunan; Yang Lei; Deng Jianchun; Li Yiquan; Xu Hang; Lin Yinhai; Zhang Yiming; Guo Yandong; Lai Jinhong; Chen Haijiang; Yan Lei; Coach: Zhai Yongjun	South Korea (KOR) Kim Ho-Yong; Kim Dong-Hyun; Choi Ho-Sung; Oh Dong-Suk; Ko Kwang-Yub; Jang Kyung-Sik; Lee Youn-Joo; Lee Chi-Won; Baek Sang-Ha; Seo Young-Dong; Kim Ji-Nam; Bang Se-Hoon; Coach: Han Sa-Hyun
Women's team	Japan (JPN) Erika Yoshida; Miki Uramoto; Yui Kitama; Moe Uchimi; Tomoe Soeda; Chika Uemura; Mayo Hagino; Shoko Osuna; Ikumi Inoue; Mari Amimoto; Coach: Tetsuhiro Kikuchi	China (CHN) Yang San; Wang Xiao Yan; Fu Yongqing; Hao Wenhua; Peng Fengling; Liu Man; Chen Qiurong; Deng Mingzhu; Li Yanhua; Long Yun; Zhang Yanli; Coach: Xue Liang	

== Men's tournament ==
=== Preliminary round ===
==== Group A ====
Team	Pld	W	L	PF	PA	PD	Pts
China (CHN)	4	4	0	293	175	+118	8
Japan (JPN)	4	3	1	278	131	+147	7
Thailand (THA)	4	2	2	261	213	+48	6
United Arab Emirates (UAE)	4	1	3	158	289	−131	5
Malaysia (MAS)	4	0	4	126	308	−182	4

13 December
15:00

Malaysia	37–71	Thailand
Scoring by quarter: 11–14, 10–23, 6–14, 10–20

Guangyao Gymnasium

13 December
20:00

Japan	43–48	China
Scoring by quarter: 13–13, 10–12, 8–10, 12–13

Guangyao Gymnasium

14 December
13:00

China	70–40	United Arab Emirates
Scoring by quarter: 21–10, 14–5, 17–13, 18–12

Guangyao Gymnasium

14 December
20:00

Japan	81–13	Malaysia
Scoring by quarter: 22–4, 21–2, 24–2, 14–5

Guangyao Gymnasium

15 December
15:00

Japan	64–45	Thailand
Scoring by quarter: 20–7, 14–22, 20–8, 10–8

Guangyao Gymnasium

15 December
18:00

Malaysia	46–51	United Arab Emirates
Scoring by quarter: 12–8, 14–16, 10–8, 10–19

Guangyao Gymnasium

16 December
11:00

China	70–62	Thailand
Scoring by quarter: 24–8, 15–23, 23–17, 8–14

Guangyao Gymnasium

16 December
15:00

Japan	90–25	United Arab Emirates
Scoring by quarter: 25–2, 27–6, 21–7, 17–10

Guangyao Gymnasium

16 December
18:00

Malaysia	30–105	China
Scoring by quarter: 9–32, 11–22, 4–19, 6–32

Guangyao Gymnasium

17 December
15:00

United Arab Emirates	42–83	Thailand
Scoring by quarter: 7–27, 7–23, 17–18, 11–15

Guangyao Gymnasium

==== Group B ====
Team	Pld	W	L	PF	PA	PD	Pts
South Korea (KOR)	4	4	0	356	97	+259	8
Chinese Taipei (TPE)	4	3	1	210	194	+16	7
Iraq (IRQ)	4	2	2	249	192	+57	6
Kuwait (KUW)	4	1	3	145	280	−135	5
Hong Kong (HKG)	4	0	4	89	286	−197	4

13 December
9:00

Iraq	92–23	Hong Kong
Scoring by quarter: 27–7, 20–6, 23–6, 22–4

Guangyao Gymnasium

13 December
13:00

South Korea	112–17	Kuwait
Scoring by quarter: 26–4, 36–4, 26–9, 24–0

Guangyao Gymnasium

14 December
11:00

Kuwait	38–61	Chinese Taipei
Scoring by quarter: 8–24, 8–13, 10–15, 12–9

Guangyao Gymnasium

14 December
18:00

South Korea	75–40	Iraq
Scoring by quarter: 19–8, 22–11, 11–12, 23–9

Guangyao Gymnasium

15 December
13:00

South Korea	77–12	Hong Kong
Scoring by quarter: 22–2, 21–6, 20–0, 14–4

Guangyao Gymnasium

15 December
20:00

Iraq	45–60	Chinese Taipei
Scoring by quarter: 8–12, 17–13, 12–17, 8–18

Guangyao Gymnasium

16 December
9:00

Kuwait	56–35	Hong Kong
Scoring by quarter: 27–4, 13–6, 6–9, 10–16

Guangyao Gymnasium

16 December
13:00

South Korea	92–28	Chinese Taipei
Scoring by quarter: 20–5, 22–9, 19–8, 31–6

Guangyao Gymnasium

16 December
20:00

Iraq	72–34	Kuwait
Scoring by quarter: 23–8, 18–4, 14–12, 17–10

Guangyao Gymnasium

17 December
15:00

Chinese Taipei	61–19	Hong Kong
Scoring by quarter: 18–0, 20–0, 16–7, 7–12

Guangyao Gymnasium

=== Final round ===
==== Semifinals ====
17 December
18:00

China	66–52	Chinese Taipei
Scoring by quarter: 20–5, 24–14, 14–18, 8–15

Guangyao Gymnasium

17 December
20:00

South Korea	48–72	Japan
Scoring by quarter: 9–23, 14–11, 11–14, 14–24

Guangyao Gymnasium

==== 9-10th-place match ====
17 December
15:00

Malaysia	56–35	Hong Kong
Scoring by quarter: 12–9, 19–8, 14–14, 11–4

Guangyao Gymnasium

==== 7-8th-place match ====
18 December
9:00

United Arab Emirates	55–47	Kuwait
Scoring by quarter: 9–9, 12–14, 23–11, 11–13

Guangyao Gymnasium

==== 5-6th-place match ====
18 December
11:00

Thailand	61–43	Iraq
Scoring by quarter: 14–17, 22–8, 10–8, 15–10

Guangyao Gymnasium

==== Bronze-medal match ====
18 December
15:00

Chinese Taipei	44–81	South Korea
Scoring by quarter: 17–22, 6–22, 11–15, 10–22

Guangyao Gymnasium

==== Gold-medal match ====
18 December
18:00

China	41–70	Japan
Scoring by quarter: 9–18, 14–16, 8–22, 10–14

Guangyao Gymnasium

=== Men's final standing ===
Rank	Nation
1st place, gold medalist(s)	Japan (JPN)
2nd place, silver medalist(s)	China (CHN)
3rd place, bronze medalist(s)	South Korea (KOR)
4	Chinese Taipei (TPE)
5	Thailand (THA)
6	Iraq (IRQ)
7	United Arab Emirates (UAE)
8	Kuwait (KUW)
9	Malaysia (MAS)
10	Hong Kong (HKG)

== Women's tournament ==
Team	Pld	W	L	PF	PA	PD	Pts
Japan (JPN)	4	4	0	265	122	+143	8
China (CHN)	4	2	2	269	149	+120	6
Thailand (THA)	4	0	4	52	315	−263	4

12 December
11:00

Thailand	10–85	Japan
Scoring by quarter: 2–35, 2–16, 4–22, 2–12

Guangyao Gymnasium

13 December
18:00

China	51–55	Japan
Scoring by quarter: 8–15, 18–19, 10–13, 15–8

Guangyao Gymnasium

14 December
15:00

Thailand	18–80	China
Scoring by quarter: 4–18, 2–16, 3–22, 9–24

Guangyao Gymnasium

15 December
11:00

China	88–13	Thailand
Scoring by quarter: 21–0, 20–6, 18–5, 29–2

Guangyao Gymnasium

17 December
13:00

Thailand	11–62	Japan
Scoring by quarter: 2–20, 2–12, 0–16, 7–14

Guangyao Gymnasium

18 December
13:00

China	50–63	Japan
Scoring by quarter: 12–12, 18–17, 8–17, 12–17

Guangyao Gymnasium
