= Boccia at the 2010 Asian Para Games =

Boccia at the 2010 Asian Para Games were held in Zhongda Gymnasium, Guangzhou, China PR from December 13 to December 18. There were four gold medals in this sport.

== Medal summary ==
=== Medal table ===
Retrieved from Asian Para Games 2010 Official Website.

Rank	Nation	Gold	Silver	Bronze	Total
1	Thailand (THA)	2	0	1	3
2	South Korea (KOR)	1	4	2	7
3	China (CHN)	1	0	0	1
4	Hong Kong (HKG)	0	0	1	1
Totals (4 entries)		4	4	4	12

=== Medalists ===
Event	Gold	Silver	Bronze
Individual - BC1	Witsanu Huadpradit; Thailand	Ji Kwang-Min; South Korea	Kim Myeong-Su; South Korea
Individual - BC2	Watcharaphon Vongsa; Thailand	Jeong So-Yeong; South Korea	Son Jeong-Min; South Korea
Individual - BC3	Kim Han-Soo; South Korea	Jeong Ho-Won; South Korea	Tanimpat Visaratanunta; Thailand
Individual - BC4	Zheng Yuansen; China	Kim Sung-Kyu; South Korea	Leung Yuk Wing; Hong Kong

== Result ==
=== Individual - BC1 ===
==== Group Round ====
Group A

Athlete	Pld	W	L	PF	PA	PD
Kim Myeong-Su (KOR)	4	4	0	22	4	18
Yuriko Shibayama (JPN)	4	3	1	14	11	3
Masaru Hashizume (JPN)	4	2	2	18	13	5
Ngai Tong Loi (MAC)	4	1	3	8	18	-10
Lin Chih Hao (TPE)	4	0	4	6	22	-16

Group C

Athlete	Pld	W	L	PF	PA	PD
Leung Mei Yee (HKG)	3	2	1	25	6	19
Tang U Kei (MAC)	3	2	1	24	9	15
Masoumeh Abdi (IRI)	3	2	1	25	13	12
Ng Pei Feng (SIN)	3	0	3	1	47	-46

Group B

Athlete	Pld	W	L	PF	PA	PD
Yuan Weibo (CHN)	4	4	0	33	4	29
Subin Tipmanee (THA)	4	3	1	19	13	6
Lean Chin Kit (MAS)	4	2	2	13	10	3
Tse Mun King (HKG)	4	1	3	12	25	-13
Mohammad Al-Ali (UAE)	4	0	4	4	29	-25

Group D

Athlete	Pld	W	L	PF	PA	PD
Witsanu Huadpradit (THA)	3	3	0	11	5	6
Ji Kwang-Min (KOR)	3	2	1	11	5	6
Zhang Qi (CHN)	3	1	2	8	9	-1
Shahrul Mustafa (MAS)	3	0	3	3	14	-11

==== Final Round ====
Quarterfinals
B2	Subin Tipmanee (THA)	2
A1	Kim Myeong-Su (KOR)	3
D1	Witsanu Huadpradit (THA)	7
C2	Tang U Kei (MAC)	0
B1	Yuan Weibo (CHN)	8
A2	Yuriko Shibayama (JPN)	0
C1	Leung Mei Yee (HKG)	1
D2	Ji Kwang-Min (KOR)	7

Semifinals
A1	Kim Myeong-Su (KOR)	2
D1	Witsanu Huadpradit (THA)	4
B1	Yuan Weibo (CHN)	1
D2	Ji Kwang-Min (KOR)	4

Gold Medal Match
D1	Witsanu Huadpradit (THA)	8
D2	Ji Kwang-Min (KOR)	5
Third place
A1	Kim Myeong-Su (KOR)	6
B1	Yuan Weibo (CHN)	1

=== Individual - BC2 ===
==== Group Round ====
Group A

Athlete	Pld	W	L	PF	PA	PD
Mongkol Jitsa-Ngiem (THA)	4	3	1	46	14	32
Son Jeong-Min (KOR)	4	3	1	28	12	16
Yan Zhiqiang (CHN)	4	2	2	37	12	25
Ho Tung Ju (TPE)	4	2	2	13	24	-11
Mohd Salem Al-Marri (QAT)	4	0	4	1	63	-62

Group C

Athlete	Pld	W	L	PF	PA	PD
Jeong So-Yeong (KOR)	4	4	0	43	5	38
Watcharaphon Vongsa (THA)	4	3	1	37	6	31
Goh Ta Lang (SIN)	4	2	2	12	14	-2
Tan Yee Ting Jeralyn (SIN)	4	1	3	7	24	-17
Mohammed Faraj Al-Marri (QAT)	4	0	4	4	54	-50

Group B

Athlete	Pld	W	L	PF	PA	PD
Hidetaka Sugimura (JPN)	4	4	0	18	8	10
Lee Chee Hoong (MAS)	4	3	1	17	13	4
Kwok Hoi Ying Karen (HKG)	4	2	2	19	12	7
Yeung Hiu Lam (HKG)	4	1	3	9	13	-4
Abbas Abbasi (IRI)	4	0	4	7	24	-17

Group D

Athlete	Pld	W	L	PF	PA	PD
Takayuki Hirose (JPN)	2	2	0	25	2	23
Chen Lung Ai (TPE)	2	1	1	12	5	7
Sultan Al-Ktebi (UAE)	2	0	2	0	30	-30
Zhao Enyang (CHN)	0	0	0	0	0	0

==== Final Round ====
Quarterfinals
A1	Mongkol Jitsa-Ngiem (THA)	1
B2	Lee Chee Hoong (MAS)	7
D1	Takayuki Hirose (JPN)	1
C2	Watcharaphon Vongsa (THA)	5
B1	Hidetaka Sugimura (JPN)	4
A2	Son Jeong-Min (KOR)	8
C1	Jeong So-Yeong (KOR)	10
D2	Chen Lung Ai (TPE)	0

Semifinals
B2	Lee Chee Hoong (MAS)	2
C2	Watcharaphon Vongsa (THA)	8
A2	Son Jeong-Min (KOR)	3
C1	Jeong So-Yeong (KOR)	6

Gold Medal Match
C2	Watcharaphon Vongsa (THA)	6
C1	Jeong So-Yeong (KOR)	2
Third place
B2	Lee Chee Hoong (MAS)	1
A2	Son Jeong-Min (KOR)	8

=== Individual - BC3 ===
==== Group Round ====
Group A

Athlete	Pld	W	L	PF	PA	PD
Jeong Ho-Won (KOR)	4	4	0	42	1	41
Ching Yu Hey (HKG)	4	3	1	24	15	9
Dong Lieyuan (CHN)	4	1	3	16	19	-3
Sivakangai Sivapragasam (MAS)	4	1	3	10	17	-7
Leila Niazibabanazar (IRI)	4	1	3	3	43	-40

Group B

Athlete	Pld	W	L	PF	PA	PD
Tanimpat Visaratanunta (THA)	4	3	1	25	8	17
Nurulasyiqah Mohammad Taha (SIN)	4	3	1	21	9	12
Chan Hau Sin (HKG)	4	2	2	11	12	-1
Keita Kato (JPN)	4	1	3	12	16	-4
Reza P. Mohammadi (IRI)	4	1	3	9	33	-24

Group C

Athlete	Pld	W	L	PF	PA	PD
Kim Han-Soo (KOR)	3	3	0	30	1	29
Akarapol Punsnit (THA)	3	2	1	18	10	8
Lei Ming (CHN)	3	1	2	5	15	-10
Hoi Sio Keong (MAC)	3	0	3	1	28	-27

==== Final Round ====
Quarterfinals
A1	Jeong Ho-Won (KOR)	6
A3	Dong Lieyuan (CHN)	0
C2	Akarapol Punsnit (THA)	6
B2	Nurulasyiqah M. Taha (SIN)	1
B1	Tanimpat Visaratanunta (THA)	6
B3	Chan Hau Sin (JPN)	2
C1	Kim Han-Soo (KOR)	11
A2	Ching Yu Hey (HKG)	3

Semifinals
A1	Jeong Ho-Won (KOR)	10
C2	Akarapol Punsnit (THA)	0
B1	Tanimpat Visaratanunta (THA)	5
C1	Kim Han-Soo (KOR)	6

Gold Medal Match
A1	Jeong Ho-Won (KOR)	4
C1	Kim Han-Soo (KOR)	6
Third place
C2	Akarapol Punsnit (THA)	3
B1	Tanimpat Visaratanunta (THA)	4

=== Individual - BC4 ===
==== Group Round ====
Group A

Athlete	Pld	W	L	PF	PA	PD
Kim Sung-Kyu (KOR)	4	4	0	26	9	17
Leung Yuk Wing (HKG)	4	3	1	25	8	17
Worawit Bamrungphakdee (THA)	4	2	2	12	15	-3
Lim Hock Lai (MAS)	4	1	3	12	20	-8
Hossein Esmaeilifazl (IRI)	4	0	4	5	28	-23

Group B

Athlete	Pld	W	L	PF	PA	PD
Zheng Yuansen (CHN)	4	4	0	32	6	26
Sataporn Yoojaroen (THA)	4	3	1	25	10	15
Lau Wai Yan Vivian (HKG)	4	2	2	21	14	7
Maryam Maleki Falah (IRI)	4	1	3	11	24	-13
Ko Yi Ling (TPE)	4	0	4	7	42	-35

Group C

Athlete	Pld	W	L	PF	PA	PD
Seo Hyeon-Seok (KOR)	4	4	0	27	8	19
Qi Cuifang (CHN)	4	3	1	23	9	14
Akira Kinoshita (JPN)	4	2	2	14	15	-1
Kintaro Fujii (JPN)	4	1	3	13	23	-10
Wong Mei San (MAC)	4	0	4	4	26	-22

==== Final Round ====
Quarterfinals
A1	Kim Sung-Kyu (KOR)	8
C3	Akira Kinoshita (CHN)	3
C2	Qi Cuifang (CHN)	9
B2	Sataporn Yoojaroen (THA)	2
B1	Zheng Yuansen (CHN)	5
B3	Lau Wai Yan Vivian (HKG)	3
C1	Seo Hyeon-Seok (KOR)	0
B2	Leung Yuk Wing (HKG)	12

Semifinals
A1	Kim Sung-Kyu (KOR)	4
C2	Qi Cuifang (CHN)	1
B1	Zheng Yuansen (CHN)	3
B2	Leung Yuk Wing (HKG)	2

Gold Medal Match
A1	Kim Sung-Kyu (KOR)	1
B1	Zheng Yuansen (CHN)	8
Third place
C2	Qi Cuifang (CHN)	1
B2	Leung Yuk Wing (HKG)	5
