= Brunei at the 2026 Asian Para Games =

- Flag of Brunei
- IPC code: BRU
- NPC: Brunei Darussalam National Olympic Council
- Website: www.bruneiolympic.org

in Aichi-Nagoya, Japan 18 October 2026 – 24 October 2026
- Competitors: 1 (1 man and 0 women) in 1 sport
- Flag bearer (closing): TBD
- Medals: Gold 0 Silver 0 Bronze 0 Total 0

Asian Para Games appearances (overview)
- 2010; 2014; 2018; 2022; 2026

Brunei Darussalam is participating in the 2026 Asian Para Games, in Nagoya, Aichi Prefecture, Japan, from 18 to 24 October 2026.

This is Brunei's fifth appearance at the Games. Brunei Darussalam is represented by a five-member contingent comprising one para badminton athlete and four officials at the Games.

== Competitors ==
Following is the list of sports and number of athletes that will participate in the upcoming edition:

| Sport | Men | Women | Total |
|---|---|---|---|
| Badminton | 1 | - | 1 |
| Total | 1 | - | 1 |

== Badminton ==
Singles

| Athlete | Event | Group stage | | | | Round of 16 | Quarterfinals | Semifinals | Final | |
| Athlete | Event | Opposition Score | Opposition Score | Opposition Score | Rank | Opposition Score | Opposition Score | Opposition Score | Opposition Score | Rank |
|---|---|---|---|---|---|---|---|---|---|---|
| Faiq Zali | Men's SH6 | Wong (HKG) L 0-2 (5-21, 5-21) | Maclang (PHI) W 2-0 (21–18, 21–10) | Solaimalai (IND) L 0-2 (8-21, 11–21) | Did not advance | | | | | |
