= Zhang Xuelong =

Chinese Paralympic athlete

Personal information
- Born: 3 January 1988 (age 38) Shijiazhuang, China

Sport
- Sport: Paralympic athletics
Medal record
Track and field (athletics)
Representing China
Paralympic Games
Silver medal – second place	2008 Beijing	Javelin Throw – F37/38
IPC Athletics World Championships
Gold medal – first place	2011 Christchurch	Javelin throw F37-38
Gold medal – first place	2015 Doha	Javelin F37
Asian Para Games
Gold medal – first place	2010 Guangzhou	Javelin throw F37-38
Silver medal – second place	2010 Guangzhou	Discus throw F37-38

Zhang Xuelong (born 3 January 1988 in Shijiazhuang, China) is a Paralympian athlete from China competing mainly in category F37 throwing events.

Zhang won a silver medal in the F37/38 javelin at the 2008 Summer Paralympics in his home country of China he also competed in the F37/38 discus.
