= Wang Lezheng =

Chinese Paralympic athlete

Medal record

Paralympic athletics

Representing China

Paralympic Games
Bronze medal – third place	2008 Beijing	Discus throw F42
Bronze medal – third place	2012 London	Discus throw F42

World Para Athletics Championships
Silver medal – second place	2006 Assen	Shot put F42
Bronze medal – third place	2006 Assen	Discus throw F42

Asian Para Games
Silver medal – second place	2010 Guangzhou	Discus throw F42
Bronze medal – third place	2010 Guangzhou	Shot put F42

Wang Lezheng is a Paralympian athlete from China competing mainly in category F42 throwing events.

Wang competed in the 2008 Summer Paralympics in his home country of China, competing in the F42 shot put and F42 discus where he won the bronze medal.
