= Philippines at the 2010 Asian Para Games =

- IOC code: PHI
- NPC: Philippine Sports Association of the Differently Abled - (PHILSPADA) - NPC Philippines

in Guangzhou 12–19 December 2010
- Medals Ranked 21st: Gold 0 Silver 4 Bronze 3 Total 7

Asian Para Games appearances (overview)
- 2010; 2014; 2018; 2022

Youth appearances
- 2009; 2013; 2017

Philippines participated in the 2010 Asian Para Games–First Asian Para Games in Guangzhou, China from 13 to 19 December 2010. Athletes from Philippines won total seven medals, and finished at the 21st spot, tied with Syria in a medal table.

== Medalist ==
=== Silver ===
No.	Medal	Name	Sport	Event
1	Silver	Isidro Vildosola	Athletics	Men's 1500m T46
2	Silver	Achelle Guion	Powerlifting	Women's -44kg
3	Silver	Adeline Dumapong-Ancheta	Powerlifting	Women's +82.50kg
4	Silver	Josephine Medina	Table Tennis	Women's Singles

=== Bronze ===
No.	Medal	Name	Sport	Event
1	Bronze	Roger Tapia	Athletics	Men's 400m T46
2	Bronze	Anne Grace Abeto	Athletics	Women's 200m T11
3	Bronze	Daniel Damaso Jr.	Swimming	-

== Medal summary ==
=== By sports ===
Sport	Gold	Silver	Bronze	Total
Powerlifting	0	2	0	2
Athletics	0	1	2	3
Table Tennis	0	1	0	1
Swimming	0	0	1	1
Totals (4 entries)	0	4	3	7
