= Mudassar Baig =

Pakistani para-athlete (born 1979)

Personal information
- Born: 17 April 1979 Faisalabad, Pakistan
Medal record
Track and field
Representing Pakistan
Asian Para Games
Gold medal – first place	2010 Guangzhou	400m T44

Mudassar Baig (born 17 April 1979, in Faisalabad) is a Pakistani para-athlete.

== Background ==
Baig was disabled after he fractured his leg playing football in school and the doctor treating him botched his treatment. He is married with one daughter. He is employed by Pakistan Post in his home town.
