= Jingling (disambiguation) =

Jingling is the present participle of the verb jingle.

Jingling could also refer to:

== Places in China ==
- Former name of Tianmen, Hubei Province, China
  - Jingling Subdistrict (Chinese: 竟陵街道), subdistrict of Tianmen
- Jingling, Xinchang County (Chinese: 镜岭镇), town in Xinchang County, Shaoxing, Zhejiang Province, China

== People ==
- Bao Jingling (Chinese: 包景岭), Chinese politician
- Huang Jingling (Chinese: 黄晶玲), Singaporean actress and singer
- Ouyang Jingling (born 1987), Chinese paralympic athlete
