= Roger Tapia =

Filipino para-athlete

Personal information
- Home town: Pagudpud, Ilocos Norte

Sport
- Country: Philippines
- Sport: Para-athletics
- Disability: Congenital amputation
- Disability class: T46
Medal record
Men's para athletics
Representing Philippines
Asian Para Games
| Bronze medal – third place | 2010 Guangzhou | 400m T46 |
ASEAN Para Games
| Gold medal – first place | 2011 Jakarta | 400m T46 |
| Silver medal – second place | 2011 Jakarta | 200m T46 |
| Silver medal – second place | 2011 Jakarta | 100m T46 |

Roger Tapia is a Filipino para-athlete who competed in the 2012 Summer Paralympics in London.

== Early life and education ==
Born with a speech impairment caused by a cleft lip and without his left arm. Tapia began running at age 5 due to his brother being a runner. He attended the José Rizal University and was part of the school's athletics team. He is a native of Pagudpud, Ilocos Norte.

== Career ==
Tapia competed in local tournaments for Ilocos Norte winning in events against able-bodied athletes. This includes the 2008 Palarong Pambansa, the national student-athlete games.

Tapia represented the Philippines at the 2011 ASEAN Para Games where he bagged a gold in the 400m event and two silvers in the 100m and 200m events.

He qualified for the 2012 Summer Paralympics in London through the April 2012 Malaysia Open where he clocked 23.56 seconds in the 200m race. He competed in the T46 classification.
