= South Korea at the 2010 Asian Para Games =

- IOC code: KOR
- NPC: Korean Paralympic Committee
- Website: www.kosad.or.kr/english

in Guangzhou 12–19 December 2010
- Competitors: 207 in 19 sports
- Medals Ranked 3rd: Gold 27 Silver 43 Bronze 33 Total 103

Asian Para Games appearances (overview)
- 2010; 2014; 2018; 2022; 2026

Youth appearances
- 2009; 2013; 2017

South Korea participated in the 2010 Asian Para Games, the first multi-sport event for athletes with a physical disability to run parallel to an edition of the Asian Games.

== Medal summary ==
=== Medal table ===
Sport	Gold	Silver	Bronze	Total
Archery	3	3	1	7
Athletics	2	4	4	10
Badminton	2	2	0	4
Boccia	1	4	2	7
Cycling	4	4	4	12
Football 5-a-side	0	0	1	1
Goalball	0	1	0	1
Judo	1	1	1	3
Powerlifting	0	0	2	2
Rowing	0	1	1	2
Shooting	5	4	6	15
Swimming	3	5	4	12
Table tennis	1	8	3	12
Ten-pin bowling	5	4	1	10
Wheelchair basketball	0	0	1	1
Wheelchair fencing	0	1	1	2
Wheelchair tennis	0	1	1	2
Total	27	43	33	103
