= Kyrgyzstan at the 2010 Asian Para Games =

- IOC code: KGZ
- NPC: National Paralympic Federation of the Kyrgyz Republic

in Guangzhou 12–19 December 2010
- Competitors: 1 in 1 sport
- Medals: Gold 0 Silver 0 Bronze 0 Total 0

Asian Para Games appearances
- 2010; 2014; 2018; 2022

Kyrgyzstan participated tn the 2010 Asian Para Games–First Asian Para Games in Guangzhou, China from 13 to 19 December 2010. Athlete from Kyrgyzstan competed one event.
