= Athletics at the 2008 Summer Paralympics – Men's javelin throw F37–38 =

Men's Javelin F37/38 at the XIII Paralympic Games
- Venue: Beijing National Stadium
- Dates: 9 September
- Competitors: 9 from 8 nations
- Winning distance: 57.81

Medalists
1st place, gold medalist(s)		Xia Dong	China
2nd place, silver medalist(s)		Zhang Xuelong	China
3rd place, bronze medalist(s)		Javad Hardani	Iran

The men's javelin F37/38 event at the 2008 Summer Paralympics took place at the Beijing National Stadium at 17:50 on 9 September. There was a single round of competition; after the first three throws, only the top eight had 3 further throws. The competition was won by Xia Dong, representing China.

== Results ==
Rank	Athlete	Nationality	Cl.	1	2	3	4	5	6	Best	Pts.	Notes
1st place, gold medalist(s)	Xia Dong	China	F37	57.81	-	45.31	48.67	-	47.35	57.81	1201	WR
2nd place, silver medalist(s)	Zhang Xuelong	China	F37	47.28	48.15	50.24	47.10	44.49	-	50.24	1044	
3rd place, bronze medalist(s)	Javad Hardani	Iran	F38	46.43	46.21	46.29	44.91	44.05	47.65	47.65	972	SB
4	Wade McMahon	Australia	F37	45.22	40.43	43.69	46.71	45.46	45.08	46.71	970	SB
5	Ahmed Meshaima	Bahrain	F37	42.09	44.56	43.47	46.22	41.95	x	46.22	960	
6	Kenny Churchill	Great Britain	F37	44.42	45.30	42.14	43.47	41.89	44.04	45.30	941	
7	Mykola Zhabnyak	Ukraine	F37	40.02	x	40.65	44.57	34.61	x	44.57	926	SB
8	Petr Vratil	Czech Republic	F38	40.86	42.39	x	43.17	x	44.66	44.66	911	SB
9	Abdeljabbar Dhifallah	Tunisia	F37	36.47	39.10	38.87	-	-	-	39.10	812	

WR = World Record. SB = Seasonal Best.
