= Jia Qianqian =

Chinese Paralympic athlete

Personal information
- Born: 27 June 1987 (age 38) Zibo, China
- Height: 162 cm (64 in)

Sport
- Country: China
- Sport: Athletics
- Disability class: F37
- Event(s): shot put discus throw javelin throw
- Club: Shandong Province
- Coached by: Wang Xingzhang
Medal record
Track and field
Representing China
Paralympic Games
Silver medal – second place	2012 London	Javelin throw F37/38
World Championships
Silver medal – second place	2011 Christchurch	Javelin throw F38
Bronze medal – third place	2015 Doha	Javelin throw F38
Asian Para Games
Gold medal – first place	2010 Guangzhou	Javelin throw F37/38
Gold medal – first place	2014 Incheon	Javelin throw F37/38
Silver medal – second place	2010 Guangzhou	Discus throw F37
Silver medal – second place	2010 Guangzhou	Shot put F37
Silver medal – second place	2014 Incheon	Discus throw F36/37/38
Silver medal – second place	2014 Incheon	Shot put F37/38

Jia Qianqian (born 27 June 1987) is a Paralympian athlete from China competing mainly in F37 classification throwing events.

Jia first represented her country at the 2008 Summer Paralympics, entering the shot put, javelin throw and discus throw events. Success was to follow at the 2012 Summer Paralympics in London, where she won her first Paralympic medal; a silver in the F37/38 javelin, recording a distance of 31.62 metres. As well as her Paralympic success Jia has won medals at the World Championships winning a silver in the Javelin in 2011 IPC Athletics World Championships and a bronze, again in the javelin, at the 2015 IPC Athletics World Championships.

== Personal history ==
Jia was born in Zibo, China in 1987. She was born with an impairment to her right arm, and has cerebral palsy. She lives is Zibo and works as a doctor.
