= Turkmenistan at the 2010 Asian Para Games =

- IOC code: TKM
- NPC: National Paralympic Committee of Turkmenistan

in Guangzhou 12–19 December 2010
- Medals Ranked 29th: Gold 0 Silver 0 Bronze 2 Total 2

Asian Para Games appearances
- 2010; 2014; 2018; 2022

Turkmenistan participated tn the 2010 Asian Para Games–First Asian Para Games in Guangzhou, China from 13 to 19 December 2010. Athletes from Turkmenistan achieved two bronze medals and finished 29th on the medal table.
