= Bangladesh at the 2010 Asian Para Games =

- IOC code: BAN
- NPC: National Paralympic Committee of Bangladesh

in Guangzhou 12–19 December 2010
- Medals: Gold 0 Silver 0 Bronze 0 Total 0

Asian Para Games appearances (overview)
- 2010; 2014; 2018; 2022

Bangladesh participated in the 2010 Asian Para Games–First Asian Para Games in Guangzhou, China from 13 to 19 December 2010. Athletes from Bangladesh competed five events. This was the only edition participated by Bangladesh before its National Paralympic Committee (NPC) became inactive and terminated by the International Paralympic Committee (IPC).
