= Thailand at the 2010 Asian Para Games =

- IOC code: THA
- NPC: Paralympic Committee of Thailand

in Guangzhou 12–19 December 2010
- Medals Ranked 5th: Gold 20 Silver 34 Bronze 39 Total 93

Asian Para Games appearances (overview)
- 2010; 2014; 2018; 2022

Youth appearances
- 2009; 2013; 2017

Thailand participated in the 2010 Asian Para Games–First Asian Para Games in Guangzhou, China from 13 to 19 December 2010. Athletes from Thailand won total 93 medals (including 20 gold), and finished fifth at the medal table.

== Medals summary ==
=== Medals by sport ===
| Sport | Gold | Silver | Bronze | Total |
|---|---|---|---|---|
| Athletics | 10 | 17 | 13 | 40 |
| Swimming | 3 | 10 | 14 | 27 |
| Wheelchair fencing | 2 | 0 | 3 | 5 |
| Boccia | 2 | 0 | 1 | 3 |
| Powerlifting | 1 | 2 | 1 | 4 |
| Badminton | 1 | 1 | 2 | 4 |
| Wheelchair tennis | 1 | 0 | 2 | 3 |
| Judo | 0 | 1 | 2 | 3 |
| Archery | 0 | 1 | 0 | 1 |
| Shooting | 0 | 1 | 0 | 1 |
| Table tennis | 0 | 1 | 0 | 1 |
| Bowling | 0 | 0 | 1 | 1 |
| Totals (12 entries) | 20 | 34 | 39 | 93 |
