= Li Xiaowen =

Chinese scientist

- 李小文
- Born: March 2, 1947; Zigong, Sichuan, China
- Died: January 10, 2015 (aged 67); Beijing, China
- Education: University of Electronic Science and Technology of China; University of California, Santa Barbara
- Scientific career
- Fields: Remote sensing
- Workplaces: Beijing Normal University; Chinese Academy of Sciences

Li Xiaowen (Chinese: 李小文; pinyin: Lǐ Xiǎowén; 2 March 1947 – 10 January 2015) was a Chinese scientist and professor at Beijing Normal University.

== Biography ==
Li was born in Zigong, Sichuan, on March 2, 1947, with his ancestral home in Guichi District of Chizhou, Anhui. He graduated from University of Electronic Science and Technology of China in 1968. After the Cultural Revolution, he went to United States of America to study at University of California, Santa Barbara, he earned a master's degree in geography and PhD in Electrical and Computer Engineering. After graduation, he taught at Beijing Normal University, he was Deputy Dean of the Environmental Science College of Beijing Normal University. He was named a Changjiang Scholar by the Ministry of Education of the People's Republic of China. In 2001, he was elected an academician of the Chinese Academy of Sciences.

On January 10, 2015, he died in Beijing.

== Personal life ==
Li and his wife, Mrs Wu, had two daughters, who live in the United States.
