= Malaysia at the 2010 Asian Para Games =

- IPC code: MAS
- NPC: Malaysia Paralympic Council
- Flag bearer: Muhammad Salam Sidik
- Medals Ranked 6th: Gold 9 Silver 8 Bronze 20 Total 37

Asian Para Games appearances (overview)
- 2010; 2014; 2018; 2022

Malaysia participated in the 2010 Asian Para Games–First Asian Para Games in Guangzhou, China from 13 to 19 December 2010. Athletes from Malaysia won total 45 medals (including nine gold), and finished at the sixth spot. The country participated in 15 sports out of 19 sports contested in the event.

== Medalists ==
Medal	Name	Sport	Event
Gold	Mohd Hisham Khaironi	Athletics	Men's 200 m T12
Gold	Cheah Liek Hou	Badminton	Men's singles BMSTU5
Gold	Cheah Liek Hou & Suhaili Laiman	Badminton	Men's doubles BMSTU4-5
Gold	Nabilah Ahmat Sharif	Badminton	Women's singles BMSTL2
Gold	Choo Kam Chan & Ku Izham Ku Harun	Bowling	Doubles TPB2+TPB2
Gold	Abu Bakar Nyat & Wong Kee Soon	Bowling	Doubles TPB9+TPB9
Gold	Yusup Dewa	Swimming	Men's 100 m freestyle S6
Gold	Fraidden Dawan	Swimming	Men's 400 m freestyle S10
Gold	Zul Amirul Sidi Abdullah	Swimming	Men's 50 m backstroke S5
Silver	Mohd Hisham Khaironi	Athletics	Men's 100 m T12
Silver	Muhammad Hafiz Abu Bakar, Mohd Raduan Emeari, Krishna Kumar Hari Das, Amir Firdauss Jamaluddin	Athletics	Men's 4 × 100 m T35–T38
Silver	Hemala Devi Eni Kutty	Athletics	Women's discus throw F12
Silver	Madzlan Saibon	Badminton	Men's singles BMW3
Silver	Soo Choon Hung	Bowling	Singles TPB3
Silver	Wong Kee Soon	Bowling	Singles TPB9
Silver	Siow Lee Chan	Powerlifting	Women's -60kg
Silver	Sharifah Raudzah Syed Akil	Powerlifting	Women's -82.50kg
Bronze	Mohd Zafi Mat Saleh, Zulkifli Mat Zin, Salam Sidik	Archery	Team recurve open
Bronze	Ahmad Rafee Arifin	Athletics	Men's 1500 m T46
Bronze	Lee Sheng Chow	Athletics	Men's shot put F12
Bronze	Norsyazwani Abdullah	Athletics	Women's 100 m T38
Bronze	Norsyazwani Abdullah	Athletics	Women's 200 m T38
Bronze	Law King Kiew	Athletics	Women's discus throw F54–56
Bronze	Hemala Devi Eni Kutty	Athletics	Women's shot put F12
Bronze	Radhi Juhari	Badminton	Men's singles BMSTL1
Bronze	Loi Lang Yean	Badminton	Men's singles BMSTL2
Bronze	Bakri Omar	Badminton	Men's singles BMSTL3
Bronze	Hairul Fozi Saaba & Mohd Zambri Yusof	Badminton	Men's doubles BMSTL1-3
Bronze	Choo Kam Chan	Bowling	Singles TPB2
Bronze	Muhammad Suhaili Hamid	Bowling	Singles TPB3
Bronze	Woon Wai Ping	Bowling	Singles TPB10
Bronze	Mariappan Perumal	Powerlifting	Men's -75kg
Bronze	Fatimah Wagimin	Powerlifting	Women's -67.50kg
Bronze	Jamery Siga	Swimming	Men's 50 m backstroke S5
Bronze	Fraidden Dawan	Swimming	Men's 100 m butterfly S10
Bronze	Mohamad Azwar Bakar, Hong Chin Sing, Koh Zhi Liang, Ting Ing Hock	Table tennis	Men's team C9-10
Bronze	Mohd Zamrin Kassim	Wheelchair fencing	Men's individual Sabre category A

Medals by sport
Sport	1st place, gold medalist(s)	2nd place, silver medalist(s)	3rd place, bronze medalist(s)	Total
Archery	0	0	1	1
Athletics	1	3	6	10
Badminton	3	1	4	8
Bowling	2	2	3	7
Cycling				
Powerlifting	0	2	2	4
Shooting				
Swimming	3	3	3	9
Table tennis	0	0	1	1
Wheelchair fencing	0	0	1	1
Total				

== See also ==
- Malaysia at the 2010 Asian Games
