= Ouyang Jingling =

Chinese Paralympic athlete (born 1987)

Personal information
- Nationality: Chinese
- Born: November 27, 1987 (age 38) Baoshan, China
- Height: 170 cm (67 in)

Sport
- Sport: Athletics
- Disability class: F46
- Event(s): sprint, long jump
- Club: Hunan Province
- Coached by: Zhou Xiaoping
Medal record
Paralympic athletics
Representing China
Paralympic Games
Bronze medal – third place	2012 London	Long jump – T46
IPC Athletics World Championships
Silver medal – second place	2006 Assen	100 m – T46
Asian Para Games
Gold medal – first place	2010 Guangzhou	Long jump – T44/46
Silver medal – second place	2010 Guangzhou	100 m – T46
Silver medal – second place	2010 Guangzhou	100 m – T46

Ouyang Jingling (born 27 November 1987) is a Paralympic athlete from China who competes in throwing events for F37 classification athletes.

== Athletic career ==
Ouyang became involved in sport in 2002, after her father noticed a talent and took her to a training session. She competed at the 2004 Summer Paralympics in Athens, entering the 100m and 200m sprint and the long jump, though she did not win a medal. Her first major international success came at the 2006 IPC Athletics World Championships in Assen where she won a silver medal in the 100 metre sprint (T46). Although she was not in the China team for her home Paralympic Games in Beijing, she did represent her country at the 2012 Summer Paralympics in London, winning a bronze medal in the long jump.

== Personal career ==
Ouyang was born in Chenzhou, China in 1987. An accident with a firecracker at the age of nine resulted in her right arm being amputated.
