= Mohammad Barrangi =

Iranian-British artist

Mohammad Barrangi is an artist born in Rasht, Iran in 1988. Barrangi studied art before moving into book illustration, graduating from the Islamic Azad University of Tonekabon in 2011. He left Iran in 2017 and lives in Yorkshire.

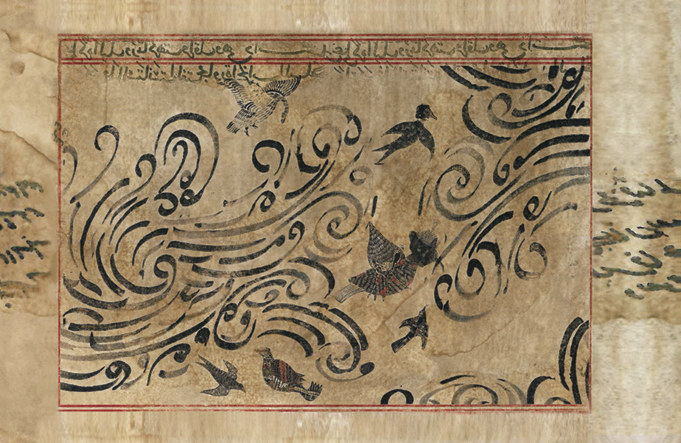
Mohammad Barrangi, Vogelgespräche

== Art ==
Barrangi’s work is inspired by his heritage, Iranian mythological stories and contemporary events of social upheaval. His works combines elements of Persian calligraphy, old scientific illustration, storytelling, text, and humour. Using a creative process involving drawing and printing on handmade paper and using traditional calligraphy pens and mark-marking styles, he creates works which are often developed into large-scale murals.

My work often focuses on journeys and travelling. Sometimes I will combine elements from classical Western paintings with Eastern stories or imagery.

Barrangi’s work centres on experiences of travel, journeys and his lived experience with immigration and disability. His works often contain images of animals such as birds, reptiles and mythical creatures to talk about migration, freedom, companionship, and different experiences of this world. Reflecting his own experience as an artist with a disability, his works often represent characters with limb difference, lost arms and legs, or other disabilities, as well as images of women that he admires such as family members and friends, or exiled Iranian queens.

I create images that come from my soul and feelings in which I show part of my homeland. I use Persian calligraphy and alphabetic shapes as the main components in my work. These elements are something like poetry for me. I try to invite the audience to visit Iran by looking at my artwork and getting familiar with my process of thinking. I hope I am being able to convey a little bit of this with my art.

Having left his homeland in 2017, he was placed in an initial accommodation centre in Wakefield. During this time, he was introduced to The Art House in Wakefield and welcomed into their Studio of Sanctuary residency programme. In 2020 he studied at the Royal Drawing School in London.

=== Printmaking ===
Born with the use of only one arm, Barrangi works directly on the floor and uses his feet to stabilise his prints while he is cutting or printing. Reflecting on his lived experience, his work includes characters with missing limbs.

To create his prints, Barrangi begins by preparing handcrafted papers. Inspired by scientific illustrations, storytelling, and text, he uses a unique process involving traditional Persian calligraphy to create drawings, which he then digitises. Using inkjet printouts, he transfers the designs using solvents, collaging them directly onto paper which has been prepared with Iranian wood stain. The final results are delicate works on paper that evoke ancient manuscripts, both in colour and in texture, and in which he hopes to transport his audience to Iran using his art.

Barrangi’s prints are often translated into large-scale murals that occupy full gallery walls. After directly applying the prints, he embarks on the long process of rubbing away the top layer of fibres to reveal the images underneath

=== Sculpture ===
In 2022, Barrangi opened a major solo exhibition, titled Dreamland, at the Art House in Wakefield showing new prints, murals, and sculpture, made for the first time. Dreamland was the first time Barrangi had translated his evocative illustrations into sculptural forms, developed using pioneering 3D-printing technology with Wakefield-based XPLOR. His sculpture Wonderland (2022), was a 2.5-metre-tall sculpture of a woman riding a stag, a recurring character in his prints. Waiting for a Saviour (2022) is a mural that includes a three-dimensional form, the zebra-unicorn, a fantastical hybrid creature taken from his The Mystical Creatures of Eden canvas series, in which he attempts to blur the boundaries between imagination and reality.

=== Publications ===
Fariduddin Attar: Vogelgespräche. Illustrated, Farsi-German edition. Text editing from Marjan Fouladvand, Illustrations from Mohammad Barrangi. Edition Orient, Berlin 2022, ISBN 978-3-945506-27-1

=== Exhibitions ===
Barrangi regularly exhibits in the UK and internationally. Exhibitions have included Muestra del IV Premi International, Tragaluz; Pressing Matters; Shape Open 2018: Collective Influence; Illustrate 2018, Portugal; Art TSUM, Kiev; Ratata Festival, Macerata; The 6th International Tokyo Mini-Print Triennial; Bologna Illustrators Exhibition 2018; Story Museum, Oxford; and Hafez Gallery in Saudi Arabia 2019. Advocartsy presented Barrangi’s U.S. debut with a solo exhibition titled The Conference of the Birds in early 2020. In 2021 he presented work for Diaspora Pavilion 2 at Block 336 in London, and had a solo exhibition at Edinburgh Printmakers in 2022.

His most comprehensive solo exhibition in the UK, Dreamland, was held at the Art House in Wakefield in 2022.

== Running ==
Alongside his artistic practice, sport has played a major role in Barrangi's life. At the age of 19 he began running, and joined the Iranian national team before going on to represent his country as a Paralympian in 100m and 200m races. He describes competitive running as a form of meditation, and a metaphor for life, "training day in and day out to become a hero".
