= Lei Zhu =

Macanese engineer and professor

Lei Zhu (Chinese: 祝雷; born c. 1963) is an engineer and distinguished professor at the University of Macau.

Zhu obtained his B.Eng. degree from the Nanjing Institute of Technology in 1985 and his Master's Southeast University in 1988, before earning his doctorate from the University of Electro-Communications in Japan. He worked as a research engineer at Matsushita Kotobuki Electronics Industries and later as a Fellow at École Polytechnique, Montreal, Canada. From 2000 onwards, he was based at Nanyang Technological University in Singapore.

While at Nanyang Technological University, Zhu was named Fellow of the Institute of Electrical and Electronics Engineers (IEEE) in 2012 "for contributions to modeling, design and development of planar microwave filters".
