= Lebanon at the 2010 Asian Para Games =

- IOC code: LIB
- NPC: Lebanese Paralympic Committee

in Guangzhou 12–19 December 2010
- Medals Ranked 27th: Gold 0 Silver 1 Bronze 1 Total 2

Asian Para Games appearances
- 2010; 2014; 2018; 2022

Youth appearances
- 2009

Lebanon participated in the 2010 Asian Para Games–First Asian Para Games in Guangzhou, China from 13 to 19 December 2010. Athletes from Lebanon won two medals, and finished at the 27th spot in a medal table.
