= Brunei at the 2018 Asian Para Games =

- IPC code: BRU
- NPC: Paralympic Council of Brunei Darussalam

in Jakarta 6–13 October 2018
- Competitors: 8 in 2 sports
- Officials: 8
- Medals: Gold 0 Silver 0 Bronze 0 Total 0

Asian Para Games appearances (overview)
- 2010; 2014; 2018; 2022

Brunei participated at the 2018 Asian Para Games which was held in Jakarta, Indonesia from 6 to 13 October 2018. The Bruneian delegation consisted of eight athletes competing in two sports, athletics and ten-pin bowling, and eight officials. Brunei's chef de mission for the games was Haji Rosmadee bin Haji Md Daud.

== See also ==
- Brunei at the 2018 Asian Games
