= Bahrain at the 2010 Asian Para Games =

- IOC code: BRN
- NPC: Bahrain Disabled Sports Federation-Bahrain Paralympic Committee

in Guangzhou 12–19 December 2010
- Medals Ranked 19th: Gold 1 Silver 2 Bronze 0 Total 3

Asian Para Games appearances (overview)
- 2010; 2014; 2018; 2022

Bahrain participated in the 2010 Asian Para Games–First Asian Para Games in Guangzhou, China from 13 to 19 December 2010. Athletes from Bahrain won total three medals (including one gold), and finished at the 19th spot in a medal table.
