= Uzbekistan at the 2010 Asian Para Games =

- IOC code: UZB
- NPC: Uzbekistan National Paralympic Association

in Guangzhou 12–19 December 2010
- Medals Ranked 18th: Gold 1 Silver 2 Bronze 3 Total 6

Asian Para Games appearances
- 2010; 2014; 2018; 2022

Youth appearances
- 2009

Uzbekistan participated in the 2011 Asian Para Games–First Asian Para Games in Guangzhou, China from 13 to 19 December 2010. Athletes from Uzbekistan won total six medals (including one gold), and finished at the 18th spot in a medal table.
