= Brunei at the 2010 Asian Para Games =

- IOC code: BRU
- NPC: Paralympic Council of Brunei Darussalam

in Guangzhou 12–19 December 2010
- Medals Ranked 25th: Gold 0 Silver 2 Bronze 2 Total 4

Asian Para Games appearances (overview)
- 2010; 2014; 2018; 2022

Brunei participated in the 2010 Asian Para Games–First Asian Para Games in Guangzhou, China from 13 to 19 December 2010. Athletes from Brunei won four medals, and finished 25th in the medal table.
