= Macau at the 2010 Asian Para Games =

- IOC code: MAC
- NPC: Associacion Recreativa dos Deficientes de Macau

in Guangzhou 12–19 December 2010
- Competitors: 14 in 4 sports
- Medals: Gold 0 Silver 0 Bronze 0 Total 0

Asian Para Games appearances
- 2010; 2014; 2018; 2022

Macau participated in the 2010 Asian Para Games–First Asian Para Games in Guangzhou, China from 13 to 19 December 2010. Athletes from Macau competed four events.
