= Singapore at the 2010 Asian Para Games =

- IPC code: SIN
- NPC: Singapore National Paralympic Council
- Competitors: 24
- Flag bearer: Firdaus Bin Nordin
- Officials: 24
- Medals Ranked 28th: Gold 0 Silver 0 Bronze 4 Total 4

Asian Para Games appearances (overview)
- 2010; 2014; 2018; 2022

Singapore participated at the 2010 Asian Para Games—First Asian Para Games in Guangzhou, China from 13 to 19 December 2010. Athletes from Singapore achieved four bronze medals only. The Chef-de-Mission of the delegation was Mr. Henry Tan.

== Medalists ==
Medal	Name	Sport	Event
Bronze	Theresa Goh	Swimming	Women's 50m Backstroke S5
Bronze	Theresa Goh	Swimming	Women's 50m Freestyle S5
Bronze	Mohamed Ismail Hussain; Thomas Yong Phen Chong	Bowling	Doubles TPB1+TPB3
Bronze	Rex Tan Swang Hee; Anuar Said	Bowling	Doubles TPB8+TPB10
