= Myanmar at the 2010 Asian Para Games =

- IPC code: MYA
- NPC: Myanmar Paralympic Sports Federation

in Guangzhou 12–19 December 2010
- Medals Ranked 30th: Gold 0 Silver 0 Bronze 1 Total 1

Asian Para Games appearances (overview)
- 2010; 2014; 2018; 2022

Myanmar participated in the 2010 Asian Para Games–First Asian Para Games in Guangzhou, China, from 13 to 19 December 2010. Athletes from Myanmar won a single bronze medal and finished 30th in the medal table.
