= Timor-Leste at the 2010 Asian Para Games =

- IOC code: TLS
- NPC: Comité Paralimpico Nacional de Timor-Leste

in Guangzhou 12–19 December 2010
- Competitors: 12 in 3 sports
- Medals: Gold 0 Silver 0 Bronze 0 Total 0

Asian Para Games appearances
- 2010; 2014; 2018; 2022

Youth appearances
- 2009

East Timor participated tn the 2010 Asian Para Games–First Asian Para Games in Guangzhou, China from 13 to 19 December 2010. Athletes from Timor-Leste competed three events.
