= Sri Lanka at the 2010 Asian Para Games =

- IOC code: SRI
- NPC: National Federation of Sports for the Disabled

in Guangzhou 12–19 December 2010
- Medals Ranked 17th: Gold 1 Silver 2 Bronze 6 Total 9

Asian Para Games appearances (overview)
- 2010; 2014; 2018; 2022

Youth appearances
- 2009

Sri Lanka participated in the 2010 Asian Para Games–First Asian Para Games in Guangzhou, China from 13 to 19 December 2010. Athletes from Sri Lanka won total nine medals (including one gold), and finished at the 17th spot in a medal table.
