= Pakistan at the 2010 Asian Para Games =

- IOC code: PAK
- NPC: National Paralympic Committee of Pakistan

in Guangzhou 12–19 December 2010
- Medals Ranked 13th: Gold 2 Silver 1 Bronze 1 Total 4

Asian Para Games appearances (overview)
- 2010; 2014; 2018; 2022

Youth appearances
- 2009

Pakistan participated in the 2010 Asian Para Games–First Asian Para Games in Guangzhou, China from 13 to 19 December 2010. Athletes from Pakistan won total four medals (including two gold), and finished at the 13th spot in a medal table.
