= Palestine at the 2010 Asian Para Games =

- IOC code: PLE
- NPC: Palestinian Paralympic Committee

in Guangzhou 12–19 December 2010
- Medals Ranked 19th: Gold 1 Silver 0 Bronze 1 Total 2

Asian Para Games appearances
- 2010; 2014; 2018; 2022

Youth appearances
- 2009

Palestine participated in the 2010 Asian Para Games–First Asian Para Games in Guangzhou, China from 13 to 19 December 2010. Athletes from Palestine won two medals (including one gold), and finished at the 20th spot in a medal table.
