= Mongolia at the 2010 Asian Para Games =

- IOC code: MGL
- NPC: Mongolian Paralympic Committee

in Guangzhou 12–19 December 2010
- Medals Ranked 24th: Gold 0 Silver 2 Bronze 3 Total 5

Asian Para Games appearances
- 2010; 2014; 2018; 2022

Youth appearances
- 2009

Mongolia participated in the 2010 Asian Para Games–First Asian Para Games in Guangzhou, China from 13 to 19 December 2010. Athletes from Mongolia won five medals, and finished at the 24th spot in a medal table.
