= Syria at the 2010 Asian Para Games =

- IOC code: SYR
- NPC: Syrian Paralympic Committee

in Guangzhou 12–19 December 2010
- Medals Ranked 21st: Gold 0 Silver 4 Bronze 3 Total 7

Asian Para Games appearances
- 2010; 2014; 2018; 2022

Syria participated in the 2010 Asian Para Games–First Asian Para Games in Guangzhou, China from 13 to 19 December 2010. Athletes from Syria won total seven medals, and finished at the 21st spot, tied with Philippines in a medal table.
