= Jordan at the 2010 Asian Para Games =

- IOC code: JOR
- NPC: Jordan Paralympic Committee

in Guangzhou 12–19 December 2010
- Medals Ranked 12th: Gold 3 Silver 0 Bronze 2 Total 5

Asian Para Games appearances
- 2010; 2014; 2018; 2022

Youth appearances
- 2009

Jordan participated in the 2010 Asian Para Games–First Asian Para Games in Guangzhou, China from 13 to 19 December 2010. Athletes from Jordan won total five medals (including three gold), and finished at the 12th spot in a medal table.
