= Kuwait at the 2010 Asian Para Games =

- IPC code: KUW
- NPC: Kuwait Paralympic Committee

in Guangzhou 12–19 December 2010
- Medals Ranked 26th: Gold 0 Silver 1 Bronze 2 Total 3

Asian Para Games appearances
- 2010; 2014; 2018; 2022

Youth appearances
- 2009

Kuwait participated in the 2010 Asian Para Games–First Asian Para Games in Guangzhou, China from 13 to 19 December 2010. Kuwait won three medals, and finished at the 26th spot in a medal table. Unaffected by its Asian Games counterpart suspension by the International Olympic Committee, it participated at the sporting event under its own national flag.

== See also ==
- Athletes from Kuwait at the 2010 Summer Youth Olympics
- Athletes from Kuwait at the 2010 Asian Games
- Athletes from Kuwait at the 2011 Asian Winter Games
