= Kazakhstan at the 2010 Asian Para Games =

- IOC code: KAZ
- NPC: National Paralympic Committee of Kazakhstan

in Guangzhou 12–19 December 2010
- Medals Ranked 23rd: Gold 0 Silver 2 Bronze 5 Total 7

Asian Para Games appearances
- 2010; 2014; 2018; 2022

Youth appearances
- 2009

Kazakhstan participated in the 2010 Asian Para Games–First Asian Para Games in Guangzhou, China from 13 to 19 December 2010. Athletes from Kazakhstan won seven medals, and finished at the 23rd spot in a medal table.
