= Saudi Arabia at the 2010 Asian Para Games =

- IOC code: KSA
- NPC: Paralympic Committee of Saudi Arabia

in Guangzhou 12–19 December 2010
- Medals Ranked 16th: Gold 1 Silver 4 Bronze 1 Total 6

Asian Para Games appearances
- 2010; 2014; 2018; 2022

Saudi Arabia participated in the 2010 Asian Para Games–First Asian Para Games in Guangzhou, China from 13 to 19 December 2010. Athletes from Saudi Arabia won total six medals (including one gold), and finished at the 16th spot in a medal table.
