= Shooting at the 2010 Asian Para Games =

Paralympic Shooting at the 2010 Asian Para Games

Shooting at the 2010 Asian Para Games were held in Guangzhou, China from December 13 to December 17.

== Medals ==
Rank	Nation	Gold	Silver	Bronze	Total
1	China (CHN)	6	6	3	15
2	South Korea (KOR)	5	4	6	15
3	Iran (IRI)	1	1	2	4
4	Thailand (THA)	0	1	0	1
5	Japan (JPN)	0	0	1	1
Totals (5 entries)		12	12	12	36
