= United Arab Emirates at the 2010 Asian Para Games =

- IOC code: UAE
- NPC: UAE Paralympic Committee

in Guangzhou 12–19 December 2010
- Medals Ranked 10th: Gold 4 Silver 6 Bronze 1 Total 11

Asian Para Games appearances
- 2010; 2014; 2018; 2022

United Arab Emirates (UAE) participated in the 2010 Asian Para Games–First Asian Para Games in Guangzhou, China from 13 to 19 December 2010. Athletes from UAE won total 11 medals (including four gold), and finished at the 10th spot in a medal table.
