= Hong Kong at the 2010 Asian Para Games =

- IOC code: HKG
- NPC: Hong Kong Paralympic Committee & Sports Association for the Physically Disabled

in Guangzhou 12–19 December 2010
- Medals Ranked 9th: Gold 5 Silver 9 Bronze 14 Total 28

Asian Para Games appearances (overview)
- 2010; 2014; 2018; 2022

Youth appearances
- 2009

Hong Kong participated in the 2010 Asian Para Games–First Asian Para Games in Guangzhou, China from 13 to 19 December 2010. Athletes from Hong Kong won total 28 medals (including five gold), and finished at the ninth spot in a medal table.
