= Iraq at the 2010 Asian Para Games =

- IOC code: IRQ
- NPC: Iraqi National Paralympic Committee

in Guangzhou 12–19 December 2010
- Medals Ranked 7th: Gold 9 Silver 5 Bronze 6 Total 20

Asian Para Games appearances
- 2010; 2014; 2018; 2022

Youth appearances
- 2009

Iraq participated in the 2010 Asian Para Games–First Asian Para Games in Guangzhou, China from 13 to 19 December 2010. Athletes from Iraq won total 20 medals (including nine gold), and finished at the seventh spot in a medal table.
