= China at the 2010 Asian Para Games =

- IOC code: CHN
- NPC: National Paralympic Committee of China

in Guangzhou 12–19 December 2010
- Medals Ranked 1st: Gold 185 Silver 118 Bronze 88 Total 391

Asian Para Games appearances (overview)
- 2010; 2014; 2018; 2022

Youth appearances
- 2009; 2013; 2017

China participated in the 2010 Asian Para Games–First Asian Para Games in Guangzhou, China from 13 to 19 December 2010. Athletes from China led all the medal categories, winning more than half of the total gold medals (185), the most silver medals (118), the most bronze medals (88) and the most medals overall (391, nearly 38 percent of all medals awarded).
