= 2010 Asian Para Games =

I Asian Para Games
- Host city: Guangzhou, Guangdong, China
- Motto: We cheer, we share, we win! (Chinese: 我们欢聚，我们分享，我们共赢！; pinyin: Wǒmen huānjù, wǒmen fēnxiǎng, wǒmen gòng yíng!)
- Nations: 41
- Athletes: 2,405
- Events: 341 in 19 sport
- Opening: 12 December
- Closing: 19 December
- Opened by: Li Keqiang; Vice Premier of the People's Republic of China
- Closed by: Zainal Abu Zarin; President of the Asian Paralympic Committee
- Athlete's Oath: Li Duan
- Judge's Oath: Yeoh Keat Chye
- Torch lighter: Zhang Lixin; Zhang Hai Yuan
- Main venue: Guangdong Olympic Stadium

The 2010 Asian Para Games (Chinese: 2010年亚洲残疾人运动会; pinyin: Èr líng yī líng nián Yàzhōu cánjí rén yùndònghuì), also known as the First Asian Para Games, was a parallel sports event for Asian athletes with a disability held in Guangzhou, China. Two weeks after the conclusion of the 16th Asian Games, it opened on December 12 and closed on December 19, 2010.

Approximately 2,500 athletes from 45 Asian member nations participated in 341 events from 19 sports. The games was opened by vice premier Li Keqiang at the Guangdong Olympic Stadium.

The final medal tally was led by China, followed by South Korea and third-placed Japan. 17 world and 82 Asian records were broken during the games.

== Host city ==
The Asian Para Games succeeded the FESPIC Games, whose governing body, the FESPIC Federation, was dissolved during the last edition in 2006 in Kuala Lumpur, Malaysia after merger with Asian Paralympic Council to become Asian Paralympic Committee.

On July 1, 2004, the Olympic Council of Asia (OCA) selected Guangzhou to host the 2010 Asian Games at their 23rd general assembly session in Doha, Qatar, with Guangzhou being the sole bidder of the event. A FESPIC Federation General Assembly held on 28 November 2006 at the last FESPIC Games' host city appointed the city as host of the Para Games, resulted in the tradition of hosting both the Asian Games and Para Games in the same city.

However, as the Asian Paralympic Committee had just emerged, they had yet to sign any agreement with the Olympic Council of Asia. Hence, the Asian Para Games were not yet included in the Asian Games' host city contract. Both games ran independently of each other and were managed by different Organising Committees: Guangzhou Asian Games Organising Committee (GAGOC) for Asian Games and Guangzhou Asian Para Games Organising Committee (GAPGOC) for Asian Para Games.

== Development and preparation ==
=== Venues ===
Competition and training venues plus all other facilities used for the 16th Asian Games were converted to meet the disability-accessible requirements for Asian Para Games athletes, officials, staff and audience.

- Guangdong Olympic Stadium (Main Venue) - Opening and closing ceremonies, Athletics (track and field)
- Aoti Archery Range - Archery
- Tianhe Gymnasium - Badminton
- Zhongda Gymnasium - Boccia
- Tianhe Bowling Hall - Bowling
- Guangzhou Velodrome - Cycling (track)
- University Town Triathlon Venue - Cycling (road), Athletics (marathon)
- Aoti Hockey Field - Football 5-a-side
- Huagong Stadium - Football 7-a-side
- Huagong Gymnasium - Judo
- Guanggong Gymnasium - Goalball
- Asian Games Town Gymnasium - Powerlifting, Table tennis
- Guangdong International Rowing Centre - Rowing
- Aoti Shooting Range - Shooting
- Aoti Aquatic Centre - Swimming
- Guangwai Gymnasium - Sitting volleyball
- Guangyao Gymnasium - Wheelchair basketball
- Guangda Gymnasium - Wheelchair fencing
- Tianhe Tennis School - Wheelchair tennis

=== Torch relay ===
The flame of 2010 Asian Para Games was lit on 3 December in China Millennium Monument in Beijing. The ceremonial cauldron was then lit-up by Vice President Xi Jinping.

The torch then traveled across the Tiananmen Square on 4 December then returned to Guangzhou to started the relay from 5 December to Guangdong Olympic Stadium on 12 December, where the opening ceremony was held.

Chinese athletes with disabilities carried the torch in Guangdong Olympic Stadium during the Games' Opening Ceremony. Chen Qi carried the torch into the stadium, before it was passed on to Huang Jiehua, Wu Yancong, Shan Zilong, Li Hedong, Xiao Janhong, Zhenzhen and family and the lighter of the flame was Zhang Lixin and Zhang Haiyuan.

== Marketing ==
The official mascot.

=== Emblem ===
The official emblem was inspired by traditional Xiguan coloured glass windows used in Guangzhou since the 17th century and is an important part of Lingnan architecture. The gaps between the coloured glass displays a silhouette of an athlete in motion. The overall design represents both the hospitality of the people of Guangzhou and the ability of the Asian Para Games to break down barriers between abled and disabled people.

=== Mascot ===
The official mascot for the 1st Asian Para Games is Fun Fun (芬芬), an anthropomorphic kapok, a flower which is native to Guangzhou. The mascot represents strength, joy and vitality of the athletes and the Asian Para movement.

The emblem is unveiled on 6 November 2006. The mascot is unveiled on 6 November 2008.

=== Music ===
The Guangzhou Asian Para Games Organising Committee (GAPGOC) selected "阳光起航" ("Yangguang Qihang", which means set sail in the sunshine) as the theme song for the Games.

== Ceremonies ==
=== Opening ceremonies ===
The 2010 Asian Para Games opening ceremony was held at 8:00pm China Standard Time (UTC+8) on 12 December in the Guangdong Olympic Stadium. The ceremony's artistic section "A Beautiful World" (美丽的世界) was supervised by director-in-chief Zhu Jianwei, assistant director of 2008 Summer Paralympics opening and closing ceremonies, and included more than 4600 performers, among whom 300 were disabled. Zhu described the ceremony as an emotional event which highlighted the power of love, family and people with a disability.

The opening ceremony was attended by Chinese Vice Premier Li Keqiang, President of Asian Paralympic Committee Dato' Zainal Abu Zarin and President of the International Paralympic Committee Philip Craven. Some 60,000 spectators watched the ceremony inside the stadium.

=== Closing ceremony ===
The closing ceremony was held at 8:00pm on 19 December in the Guangdong Olympic Stadium.

=== Participating National Paralympic Committees ===
All 41 members of the newly emerged Asian Paralympic Committee participated in the 2010 Asian Para Games. Kuwaiti para athletes were not affected by the International Olympic Committee suspension and unlike their Asian Games counterpart, they participated in the Games under their own national flag.

Below is a list of all the participating NPCs; the number of competitors per delegation is indicated in brackets.

Participating National Paralympic Committees
- Afghanistan (2)
- Bahrain (13)
- Bangladesh (11)
- Brunei (10)
- Cambodia (6)
- China (464)
- Hong Kong (110)
- India (101)
- Indonesia (20)
- Iran (162)
- Iraq (80)
- Japan (225)
- Jordan (23)
- Kazakhstan (63)
- South Korea (203)
- Kuwait (36)
- Kyrgyzstan (1)
- Laos (10)
- Lebanon (8)
- Macau (14)
- Malaysia (115)
- Mongolia (37)
- Myanmar (17)
- Nepal (7)
- Oman (6)
- Pakistan (35)
- Palestine (13)
- Philippines (35)
- Qatar (12)
- Saudi Arabia (19)
- Singapore (25)
- Sri Lanka (79)
- Syria (10)
- Chinese Taipei (76)
- Tajikistan (5)
- Thailand (202)
- Timor-Leste (12)
- Turkmenistan (9)
- United Arab Emirates (47)
- Uzbekistan (27)
- Vietnam (55)

=== Sports ===
- Archery (9)
- Athletics (120)
- Badminton (13)
- Boccia (4)
- Bowling (10)
- Cycling (12)
- Football 5-a-side (1)
- Football 7-a-side (1)
- Goalball (2)
- Judo (12)
- Powerlifting (20)
- Rowing (4)
- Shooting (12)
- Swimming (81)
- Table tennis (20)
- Volleyball (2)
- Wheelchair basketball (2)
- Wheelchair fencing (12)
- Wheelchair tennis (4)

== Medal table ==
A total of 2,512 athletes from 41 Asian National Paralympic Committees participated in the Games, competing in 19 sports. In the Games, 17 world and 82 Asian records were broken.

A total of 1,020 medals (341 gold, 338 silver and 341 bronze medal) were awarded. Two bronze medals were awarded per event in wheelchair fencing (except women's team épée) and judo (except women's 48-, 57-, 63- and 70-kg categories). In athletics only three athletes participated in some events, thus bronzes were not awarded in four women's events (shot put – F35/36,^{[a]} 400 m – T12,^{[b]} 200 m – T12^{[b]} and 100 m – T12^{[b]}) and the men's discus throw – F51/52/53,^{[c]} long jump – F36,^{[a]} 1500 m – T11^{[b]} and 1500 m – T37.^{[a]} A tie for second place in the men's high jump – F42 event^{[c]} meant that two silvers were awarded; in this event, all medals were won by Chinese athletes. In badminton, due to the participation of only three players in the women's singles BMSTL2 event,^{[d]} no bronze medal was awarded. Only two athletes participated in women's −82.50 kg event of powerlifting, so no bronze was awarded. In women's wheelchair basketball, only three teams participated and no bronze was awarded.

* Host nation (China)

2010 Asian Para Games medal table
Rank	NPC	Gold	Silver	Bronze	Total
1	China (CHN)*	185	118	88	391
2	Japan (JPN)	32	39	32	103
3	South Korea (KOR)	27	43	33	103
4	Iran (IRI)	27	24	29	80
5	Thailand (THA)	20	34	39	93
6	Malaysia (MAS)	9	8	20	37
7	Iraq (IRQ)	9	5	6	20
8	Chinese Taipei (TPE)	8	7	11	26
9	Hong Kong (HKG)	5	9	14	28
10	United Arab Emirates (UAE)	4	6	1	11
11	Vietnam (VIE)	3	4	10	17
12	Jordan (JOR)	3	0	2	5
13	Pakistan (PAK)	2	1	1	4
14	Indonesia (INA)	1	5	5	11
15	India (IND)	1	4	9	14
16	Saudi Arabia (KSA)	1	4	1	6
17	Sri Lanka (SRI)	1	2	6	9
18	Uzbekistan (UZB)	1	2	3	6
19	Bahrain (BHR)	1	2	0	3
20	Palestine (PLE)	1	0	1	2
21	Philippines (PHI)	0	4	3	7
21	Syria (SYR)	0	4	3	7
23	Kazakhstan (KAZ)	0	2	5	7
24	Mongolia (MGL)	0	2	3	5
25	Brunei (BRU)	0	2	2	4
26	Kuwait (KUW)	0	1	2	3
27	Lebanon (LIB)	0	1	1	2
28	Singapore (SIN)	0	0	4	4
29	Turkmenistan (TKM)	0	0	2	2
30	Myanmar (MYA)	0	0	1	1
30	Qatar (QAT)	0	0	1	1
Totals (31 entries)		341	333	338	1,012

Notes

- ^{a} "T" plus a number signifies a track class and "F" plus a number signifies a field class. Classes 32–38 cover athletes with different levels of cerebral palsy – both for athletes who use a wheelchair (32–34) and those that are ambulant (35–38).
- ^{b} Classes 11, 12 and 13 cover the different levels of visual impairment.
- ^{c} Classes 40–46 cover athletes who are ambulant with different levels of amputations.
- ^{d} This class covers badminton player who is ambulant but has moderate impairments of the legs.
- "All Sports – Medal Standings". gzapg2010.cn (Official website of the Games). Guangzhou 2010 Asian Para Games Organising Committee. Archived from the original on December 16, 2010.

== See also ==
- 2010 Asian Games

Preceded by Kuala Lumpur	Asian Para Games; Guangzhou; I Asian Para Games (2010)	Succeeded by Incheon
