= Chinese Taipei at the 2010 Asian Para Games =

- IOC code: TPE
- NPC: Chinese Taipei Paralympic Committee

in Guangzhou 12–19 December 2010
- Medals Ranked 8th: Gold 8 Silver 7 Bronze 11 Total 26

Asian Para Games appearances (overview)
- 2010; 2014; 2018; 2022

Youth appearances
- 2009; 2013

Chinese Taipei participated in the 2010 Asian Para Games–First Asian Para Games in Guangzhou, China from 13 to 19 December 2010. Athletes from Taiwan won total 26 medals (including eight gold), and finished at the eighth spot in a medal table.
