= Swimming at the 2010 Asian Para Games =

Paralympic Swimming at the 2010 Asian Para Games
- Dates: 13-18 December 2010

Swimming at the 2010 Asian Para Games were held in Guangzhou, China from December 13 to December 18.

== Medals ==
Rank	Nation	Gold	Silver	Bronze	Total
1	China (CHN)	48	32	22	102
2	Japan (JPN)	15	20	16	51
3	Chinese Taipei (TPE)	5	0	1	6
4	Thailand (THA)	3	10	14	27
5	Malaysia (MAS)	3	5	5	13
6	South Korea (KOR)	3	5	4	12
7	Iran (IRI)	3	3	7	13
8	Vietnam (VIE)	1	1	1	3
9	Kazakhstan (KAZ)	0	2	2	4
10	Sri Lanka (SRI)	0	1	1	2
11	Indonesia (INA)	0	1	0	1
12	India (IND)	0	0	4	4
13	Singapore (SGP)	0	0	2	2
14	Myanmar (MYA)	0	0	1	1
14	Philippines (PHI)	0	0	1	1
Totals (15 entries)		81	80	81	242
