= Chinese Taipei at the 2016 Summer Paralympics =

- Chinese Taipei Paralympic flag
- IPC code: TPE
- NPC: Chinese Taipei Paralympic Committee

in Rio de Janeiro
- Competitors: 13 in 6 sports
- Flag bearer: Lin Tzu-hui
- Medals Ranked 68th: Gold 0 Silver 1 Bronze 1 Total 2

Summer Paralympics appearances (overview)
- 1992; 1996; 2000; 2004; 2008; 2012; 2016; 2020; 2024

Chinese Taipei competed at the 2016 Summer Paralympics in Rio de Janeiro, Brazil, from 7 to 18 September 2016.

== Delegation ==
Chinese Taipei sent a team of 13 athletes, 5 men and 8 women, and 4 officials to the 2016 Summer Paralympics. They competed archery, athletics, judo, powerlifting, table tennis and wheelchair tennis.

== Medalists ==
Medal	Name	Sport	Event	Date
Silver	Cheng Ming-chih; Lin Yen-hung	Table tennis	Men's team – Class 4–5	16 September
Bronze	Tzu-Hui Lin	Powerlifting	Women's 79 kg	12 September

== Disability classifications ==
Every participant at the Paralympics has their disability grouped into one of five disability categories; amputation, the condition may be congenital or sustained through injury or illness; cerebral palsy; wheelchair athletes, there is often overlap between this and other categories; visual impairment, including blindness; Les autres, any physical disability that does not fall strictly under one of the other categories, for example dwarfism or multiple sclerosis. Each Paralympic sport then has its own classifications, dependent upon the specific physical demands of competition. Events are given a code, made of numbers and letters, describing the type of event and classification of the athletes competing. Some sports, such as athletics, divide athletes by both the category and severity of their disabilities, other sports, for example swimming, group competitors from different categories together, the only separation being based on the severity of the disability.

== Events ==
=== Archery ===
Lee Yun-hsien finished second at the 2016 Final Paralympic Qualifying Tournament held in Nove Mesto, Czech Republic, securing a place in the 2016 Summer Paralympics. Paralympic record holder Tseng Lung-hui, who placed sixth in the tournament, also secured a ticket to the competition. The pair also qualified for the mixed team recurve open event.

Athlete	Event	Ranking round		Round of 32	Round of 16	Quarterfinals	Semifinals	Finals	
Athlete	Event	Score	Seed	Opposition score	Opposition score	Opposition score	Opposition score	Opposition score	Rank
Tseng Lung-hui	Men's individual recurve	611	10	Lukow (USA) (23); W 6–0	Bennett (USA) (7); L 4–6	did not advance			9
Lee Yun-hsien	Women's individual recurve	550	21	Melle (LAT) (12); L 5–6	did not advance				17
Lee Yun-hsien; Tseng Lung-hui	Mixed team recurve	1161	9	—N/a	Great Britain (8); L 2–6	did not advance			9

=== Athletics ===
Track Events

Athlete	Event	Heats		Seminfinals		Final	
Athlete	Event	Result	Rank	Result	Rank	Result	Rank
Yang Chuan-hui	Men's 100m T11	11.93 SB	4	did not advance			

Field Events

Liu Ya-ting, aged 25, competed in the Games for the second time. She set a new Paralympic record at the women's F13 javelin throw event in the 2012 Summer Paralympics.

Athlete	Event	Distance	Rank
Yang Chuan-hui	Men's Long Jump T11	6.12	4
Liu Ya-ting	Women's Shot Put F11–12	10.32	10
Liu Ya-ting	Women's Javelin Throw F12–13	35.18	5

=== Cycling ===
With one pathway for qualification being one highest ranked NPCs on the UCI Para-Cycling male and female Nations Ranking Lists on 31 December 2014, Chinese Taipei qualified for the 2016 Summer Paralympics in Rio, assuming they continued to meet all other eligibility requirements.

=== Judo ===
Runner-up from the 2012 Summer Paralympics, Lee Kai-lin was qualified to compete in the women's 48 kg weight class by virtue of her IBSF world ranking as of May 2016. She finished fifth in the event.

Athlete	Event	Seed	Preliminaries	Quarterfinals	Semifinals	Repechage		Final / BM	
Athlete	Event	Seed	Opposition Result	Opposition Result	Opposition Result	Opposition Result	Opposition Result	Opposition Result	Rank
Chang You	Men's –60kg	10	Borges (URU) (8); L 000–102	did not advance					9
Lee Kai-lin	Women's –48kg	2	—N/a	Gomez (ARG) (6); W 100–000	Li L (CHN) (4); L 000^{1}–000	—N/a	BYE	Tasin (TUR) (7); L 010–002	5

=== Powerlifting ===
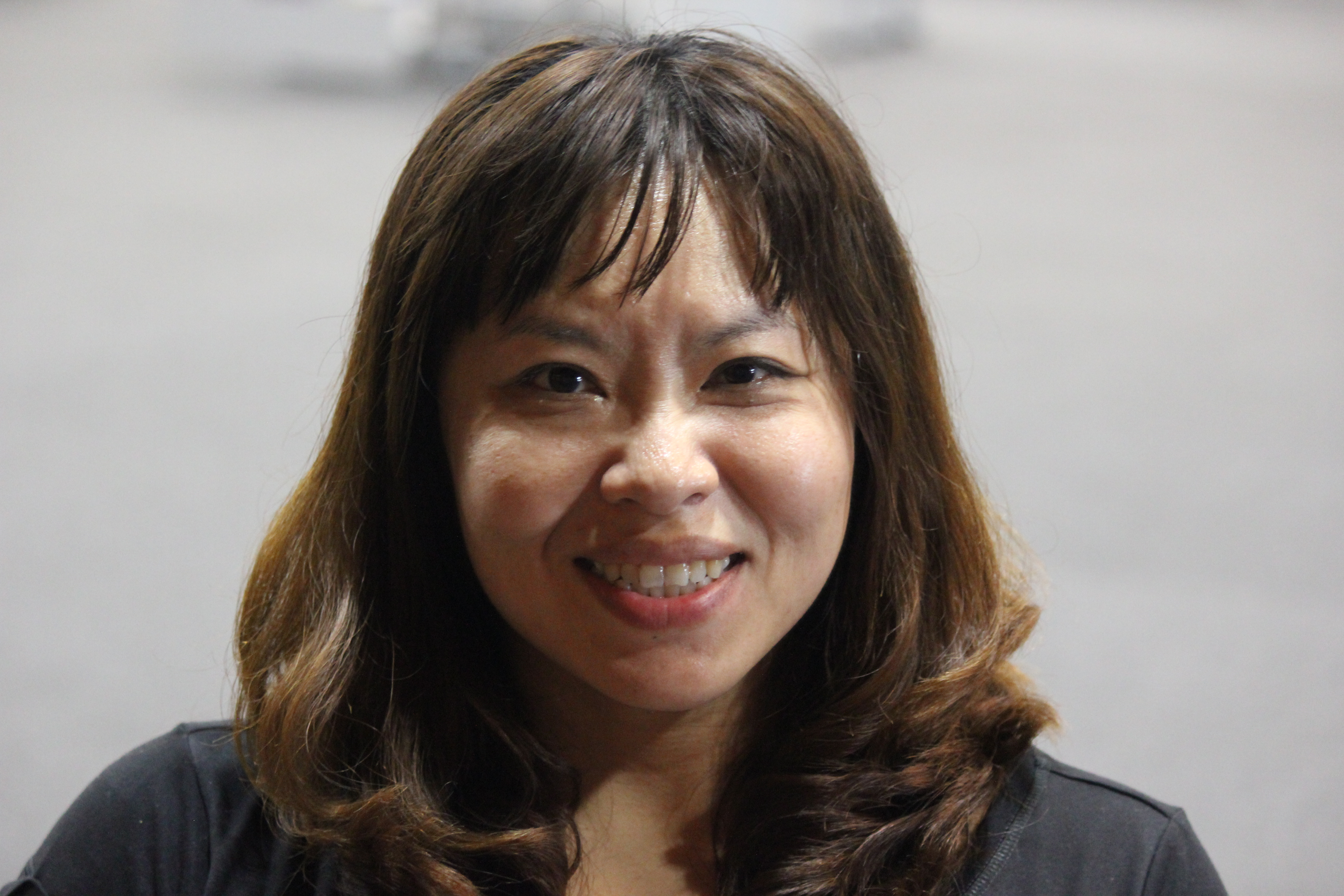
Ya-Hsuan Lin in Rio for the 2016 Games.

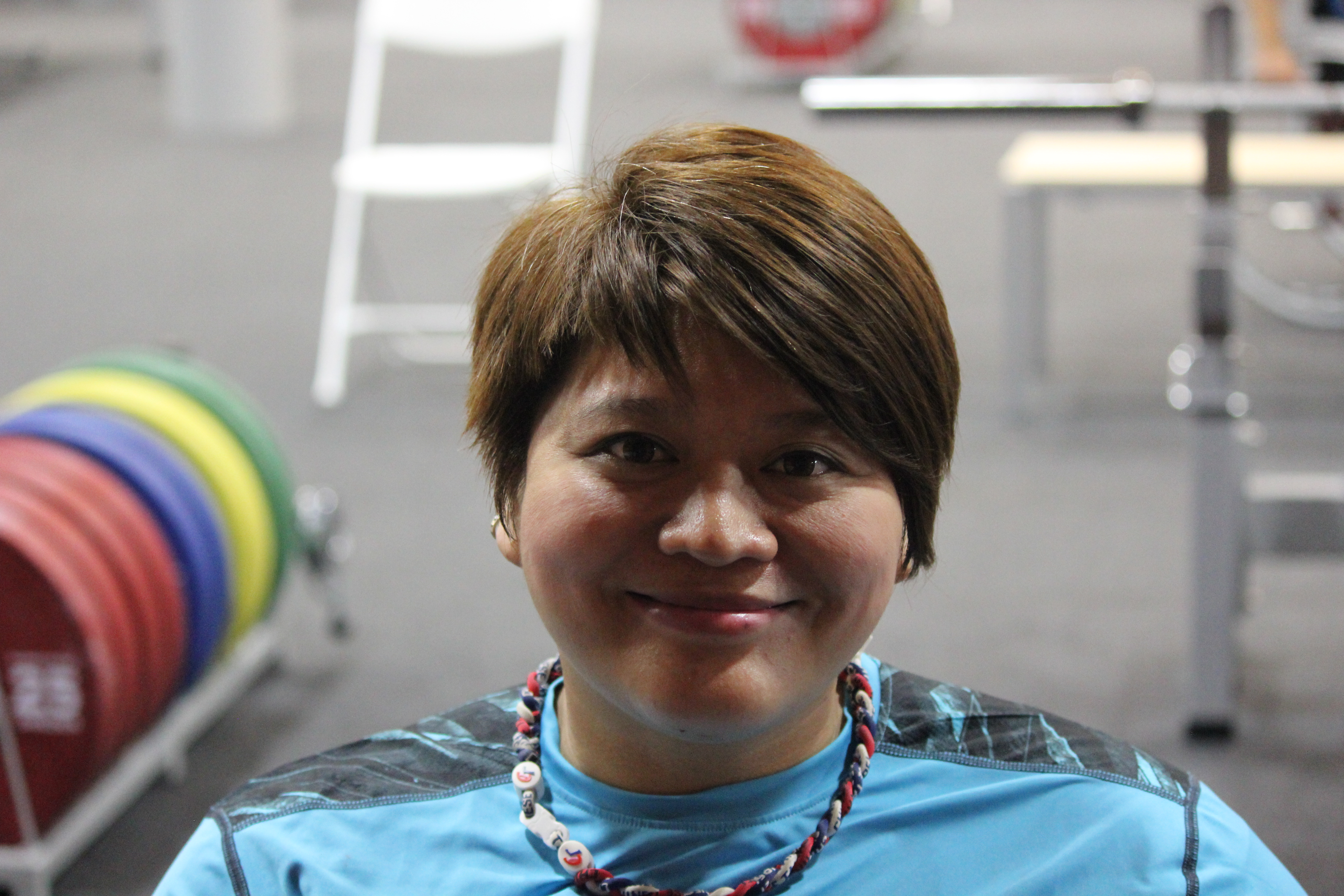
Lin Tzu Hui in Rio for the Games.

Five-time Paralympian and three-time Paralympic medalist, Lin Tzu-hui seeks to defend her title in the women's 79 kg weight class. Lin was entered into the competition by virtue of her world ranking as of April 2016. Lin Ya-hsuan will also compete in the Paralympics for the fourth consecutive time. The best outcome out of three attempts counted as the final results. The athlete who placed first in each event was allowed a fourth attempt to break the Paralympic or world record.

Athlete	Event	Body weight (kg)	Attempts (kg)				Result (kg)	Place
Athlete	Event	Body weight (kg)	1	2	3	4	Result (kg)	Place
Lin Ya-hsuan	Women's –61 kg	57.83	78.0	~~81.0~~	~~81.0~~	–	78.0	7
Lin Tzu-hui	Women's –79 kg	77.50	~~121.0~~	125.0	131.0	–	131.0	3rd place, bronze medalist(s)

=== Table tennis ===
Three-time Paralympic medalist Wei Mei-hui is set to attend the competition for the fifth consecutive time. Lin Yen-hung, aged 58, is the oldest athlete among the delegates.

Individual

Athlete	Event	Seed	Group Stage			Round of 16	Quarterfinals	Semifinals	Final	
Athlete	Event	Seed	Opposition Result	Opposition Result	Rank	Opposition Result	Opposition Result	Opposition Result	Opposition Result	Rank
Cheng Ming-chih	Men's C5	3	Depergola (ARG) (15); W 3–0	Palikuća (SRB) (6); W 3–1	1 Q	BYE	Urhaug (NOR) (5); L 1–3	did not advance		5
Lin Yen-hung	Men's C5	9	Öztürk (TUR) (2); W 3–2	Tolba (EGY) (12); L 1–3	2 Q	Segatto (BRA) (13); W 3–2	Cao N (CHN) (1); L 0–3	did not advance		5
Lu Pi-chun	Women's C4	11	Zhang M (CHN) (3); L 0–3	Gilroy (GBR) (6); L 2–3	3	—N/a	did not advance			9
Wei Mei-hui	Women's C5	8	Gu (CHN) (2); L 0–3	Obiora (NGR) (9); L 2–3	3	—N/a	did not advance			9

Team

Athlete	Event	Seed	Round of 16	Quarterfinals	Semifinals	Final	
Athlete	Event	Seed	Opposition Result	Opposition Result	Opposition Result	Opposition Result	Rank
Cheng Ming-chih; Lin Yen-hung	Men's; C4-5	11	Argentina (ARG) (6); W 2–0	France (FRA) (3); W 2–0	Turkey (TUR) (2); W 2–0	South Korea (KOR) (1); L 1–2	2nd place, silver medalist(s)
Cheng Ming-chih; Lin Yen-hung	Men's; C4-5	11	Cheng / Lin / W 3–0 / Depergola / Copola; Cheng / W 3–0 / Copola	Cheng / Lin / W 3–1 / Aira / Thomas; Cheng / W 3–2 / Thomas	Cheng / Lin / W 3–1 / Öztürk / Turan; Cheng / W 3–2 / Öztürk	Cheng / Lin / L1–3 / Kim / Kim; Cheng / W3–1 / Kim; Lin / L0–3 / Choi	2nd place, silver medalist(s)
Lu Pi-chun; Wei Mei-hui	Women's; C4-5	6	bye	Serbia (SRB) (3); L 0–2	did not advance		5
Lu Pi-chun; Wei Mei-hui	Women's; C4-5	6	bye	Lu / Wei / L 0–3 / Matic / Perić; Lu / L 1–3 / Perić	did not advance		5

=== Wheelchair Tennis ===
Following the suspension of the Russian Paralympic team, a slot was subsequently redistributed to Lu Chia-yi, marking the first time since 2004 for which Chinese Taipei competed in Wheelchair tennis at the Summer Paralympics.

Athlete	Event	Seed	First round	Second round	Quarterfinals	Semifinals	Final	
Athlete	Event	Seed	Opposition Result	Opposition Result	Opposition Result	Opposition Result	Opposition Result	Rank
Lu Chia-yi	Women's singles	31	Cabrillana (CHI) (23); L 4–6, 3–6	did not advance				

== See also ==
- Chinese Taipei at the 2016 Summer Olympics
