= Table tennis at the 2016 Summer Paralympics =

Table tennis at the XV Paralympic Games
- Venue: Riocentro Pavilion 3
- Dates: 8–17 September
- Competitors: 269 (173 men, 96 women)

Table tennis at the 2016 Summer Paralympics in Rio took place in September 2016. 276 athletes – 174 men and 102 women – were scheduled to compete in 29 events. Table tennis events had been held at the Paralympics since the first Games in Rome in 1960. Team events featured contests consisting of one doubles and two singles matches.

== Events ==
29 events were contested. The events were men's and women's team and individual competitions for the various disability classifications.

- Men's singles
  - Class 1
  - Class 2
  - Class 3
  - Class 4
  - Class 5
  - Class 6
  - Class 7
  - Class 8
  - Class 9
  - Class 10
  - Class 11

- Men's team
  - Class 1–2
  - Class 3
  - Class 4–5
  - Class 6–8
  - Class 9–10

- Women's singles
  - Class 1–2
  - Class 3
  - Class 4
  - Class 5
  - Class 6
  - Class 7
  - Class 8
  - Class 9
  - Class 10
  - Class 11

- Women's team
  - Class 1–3
  - Class 4–5
  - Class 6–10

== Medal table ==
Rank	Nation	Gold	Silver	Bronze	Total
1	China (CHN)	13	7	1	21
2	Poland (POL)	2	3	3	8
3	France (FRA)	2	1	2	5
4	Great Britain (GBR)	2	0	1	3
4	Ukraine (UKR)	2	0	1	3
6	Belgium (BEL)	2	0	0	2
7	South Korea (KOR)	1	3	5	9
8	Serbia (SRB)	1	1	2	4
9	Turkey (TUR)	1	1	1	3
10	Croatia (CRO)	1	1	0	2
10	Netherlands (NED)	1	1	0	2
12	Denmark (DEN)	1	0	0	1
13	Germany (GER)	0	4	0	4
14	Spain (ESP)	0	2	0	2
15	Brazil (BRA)	0	1	3	4
16	Hungary (HUN)	0	1	1	2
16	Sweden (SWE)	0	1	1	2
18	Australia (AUS)	0	1	0	1
18	Chinese Taipei (TPE)	0	1	0	1
20	Italy (ITA)	0	0	2	2
20	Thailand (THA)	0	0	2	2
22	Austria (AUT)	0	0	1	1
22	Czech Republic (CZE)	0	0	1	1
22	Hong Kong (HKG)	0	0	1	1
22	Philippines (PHI)	0	0	1	1
Totals (25 entries)		29	29	29	87

== Medalists ==
=== Men's events ===
Event	Class	Gold	Silver	Bronze
Men's individual	1	Rob Davies; Great Britain	Joo Young-dae; South Korea	Nam Ki-won; South Korea
Men's individual	2	Fabien Lamirault; France	Rafał Czuper; Poland	Jiří Suchánek; Czech Republic
Men's individual	3	Feng Panfeng; China	Thomas Schmidberger; Germany	Florian Merrien; France
Men's individual	4	Abdullah Öztürk; Turkey	Guo Xingyuan; China	Maxime Thomas; France
Men's individual	5	Cao Ningning; China	Valentin Baus; Germany	Mitar Palikuća; Serbia
Men's individual	6	Peter Rosenmeier; Denmark	Álvaro Valera; Spain	Rungroj Thainiyom; Thailand
Men's individual	7	Will Bayley; Great Britain	Israel Pereira Stroh; Brazil	Yan Shuo; China
Men's individual	8	Zhao Shuai; China	András Csonka; Hungary	Piotr Grudzień; Poland
Men's individual	9	Laurens Devos; Belgium	Gerben Last; Netherlands	Mohamed Amine Kalem; Italy
Men's individual	10	Ge Yang; China	Patryk Chojnowski; Poland	Krisztian Gardos; Austria
Men's individual	11	Florian Van Acker; Belgium	Samuel von Einem; Australia	Péter Pálos; Hungary
Men's team	1–2	France; Fabien Lamirault; Stéphane Molliens; Jean-François Ducay	South Korea; Joo Young-dae; Kim Kyung-mook; Cha Soo-yong	Brazil; Iranildo Conceição Espíndola; Guilherme Marcião da Costa; Aloísio Lima
Men's team	3	China; Feng Panfeng; Zhao Ping; Zhai Xiang	Germany; Thomas Schmidberger; Thomas Brüchle	Thailand; Anurak Laowong; Yuttajak Glinbancheun
Men's team	4-5	South Korea; Choi Il-sang; Kim Jung-gil; Kim Young-gun	Chinese Taipei; Cheng Ming-chih; Lin Yen-hung	Turkey; Abdullah Öztürk; Ali Öztürk; Nesim Turan
Men's team	6–8	Ukraine; Viktor Didukh; Maksym Nikolenko; Mykhaylo Popov	Sweden; Emil Andersson; Linus Karlsson	Great Britain; Will Bayley; Aaron McKibbin; Ross Wilson
Men's team	9–10	China; Ma Lin; Lian Hao; Ge Yang	Spain; José Manuel Ruiz Reyes; Juan Perez Gonzalez; Jorge Cardona	Poland; Patryk Chojnowski; Piotr Grudzień; Marcin Skrzynecki

=== Women's events ===
Event	Class	Gold	Silver	Bronze
Women's individual	1-2	Liu Jing; China	Seo Su-yeon; South Korea	Giada Rossi; Italy
Women's individual	3	Xue Juan; China	Li Qian; China	Anna-Carin Ahlquist; Sweden
Women's individual	4	Borislava Perić-Ranković; Serbia	Zhang Miao; China	Nada Matić; Serbia
Women's individual	5	Zhang Bian; China	Gu Gai; China	Jung Young-a; South Korea
Women's individual	6	Sandra Paović; Croatia	Stephanie Grebe; Germany	Maryna Lytovchenko; Ukraine
Women's individual	7	Kelly van Zon; Netherlands	Kübra Öçsoy Korkut; Turkey	Kim Seong-ok; South Korea
Women's individual	8	Mao Jingdian; China	Thu Kamkasomphou; France	Josephine Medina; Philippines
Women's individual	9	Liu Meng; China	Lei Lina; China	Karolina Pęk; Poland
Women's individual	10	Natalia Partyka; Poland	Yang Qian; China	Bruna Costa Alexandre; Brazil
Women's individual	11	Natalia Kosmina; Ukraine	Krystyna Siemieniecka; Poland	Ng Mui Wui; Hong Kong
Women's team	1–3	China; Li Qian; Liu Jing; Xue Juan	Croatia; Anđela Mužinić; Helena Dretar-Karić	South Korea; Lee Mi-gyu; Seo Su-yeon; Yoon Ji-yu
Women's team	4–5	China; Gu Gai; Zhang Bian; Zhou Ying	Serbia; Nada Matić; Borislava Perić-Ranković	South Korea; Jung Young-a; Kang Oe-jeong; Kim Ok
Women's team	6–10	Poland; Katarzyna Marszał; Natalia Partyka; Karolina Pęk	China; Lei Lina; Yang Qian; Xiong Guiyan	Brazil; Bruna Costa Alexandre; Danielle Rauen; Jennyfer Marques Parinos

== See also ==
- Table tennis at the 2016 Summer Paralympics – Qualification
- Table tennis at the 2016 Summer Olympics
