= Table tennis at the 2016 Summer Paralympics – Men's individual – Class 4 =

Table tennis at the XV Paralympic Games
- Venue: Riocentro Pavilion 3
- Dates: 8–13 September 2016
- Competitors: 18 from 12 nations

Medalists
1st place, gold medalist(s)		Abdullah Ozturk	Turkey
2nd place, silver medalist(s)		Guo Xingyuan	China
3rd place, bronze medalist(s)		Maxime Thomas	France

The men's individual table tennis – Class 4 tournament at the 2016 Summer Paralympics in Rio de Janeiro took place during 8–13 September 2016 at Riocentro Pavilion 3. Classes 1–5 were for athletes with a physical impairment that affected their legs, and who competed in a sitting position. The lower the number, the greater the impact the impairment was on an athlete's ability to compete.

In the preliminary stage, athletes competed in six groups of three. Winners and runners-up of each group qualified to the next stage.

== Results ==
All times are local time in UTC-3.

=== Main bracket ===
==== Final rounds ====
Semi-finals
B2	Guo Xingyuan (CHN)	8	11	11	12
E1	Nesim Turan (TUR)	11	7	8	10
D1	Maxime Thomas (FRA)	12	4	11	10	8
B1	Abdullah Ozturk (TUR)	10	11	7	12	11

Final
B2	Guo Xingyuan (CHN)	12	8	4	5
B1	Abdullah Ozturk (TUR)	10	11	11	11
Bronze medal match
E1	Nesim Turan (TUR)	4	9	4
D1	Maxime Thomas (FRA)	11	11	11

==== Top half ====
Round of 16						Quarter-finals							Semi-finals
						A1	Kim Young Gun (KOR)	5	5	5
F2	Wanchai Chaiwut (THA)	6	4	11	5	B2	Guo Xingyuan (CHN)	11	11	11
B2	Guo Xingyuan (CHN)	11	11	8	11								B2	Guo Xingyuan (CHN)	8	11	11	12
E1	Nesim Turan (TUR)	11	11	11	11								E1	Nesim Turan (TUR)	11	7	8	10
D2	Kim Jung-gil (KOR)	7	13	9	7	E1	Nesim Turan (TUR)	12	11	9	11	11
						C1	Rafal Lis (POL)	10	13	11	9	2

==== Bottom half ====
Round of 16							Quarter-finals							Semi-finals
							D1	Maxime Thomas (FRA)	11	11	6	11
A2	Peter Mihalik (SVK)	6	2	6			F1	Zhang Yan (CHN)	7	6	11	8
F1	Zhang Yan (CHN)	11	11	11										D1	Maxime Thomas (FRA)	12	4	11	10	8
E2	Sameh Saleh (EGY)	5	11	8	11	8								B1	Abdullah Ozturk (TUR)	10	11	7	12	11
C2	Choi Ilsang (KOR)	11	9	11	8	11	C2	Choi Ilsang (KOR)	11	4	13	5	9
							B1	Abdullah Ozturk (TUR)	8	11	11	11	11

=== Preliminary round ===
- Qualified for the knock-out stage

==== Group a ====
Rank	Athlete	Won	Lost	Points diff
1 Q	Kim Young Gun (KOR)	2	0	+9
2 Q	Peter Mihalik (SVK)	1	1	-8
3	Krzysztof Zylka (POL)	0	2	-1

Kim Young Gun (KOR)	W/O
Krzysztof Zylka (POL)	

Kim Young Gun (KOR)	12	11	13
Peter Mihalik (SVK)	10	6	11

Peter Mihalik (SVK)	11	11	6	9	11
Krzysztof Zylka (POL)	8	9	11	11	8

==== Group b ====
Rank	Athlete	Won	Lost	Points diff
1 Q	Abdullah Ozturk (TUR)	2	0	+26
2 Q	Guo Xingyuan (CHN)	1	1	+3
3	Shay Siada (ISR)	0	2	-29

Abdullah Ozturk (TUR)	11	11	11
Shay Siada (ISR)	2	7	8

Abdullah Ozturk (TUR)	8	11	11	16
Guo Xingyuan (CHN)	11	4	7	14

Guo Xingyuan (CHN)	11	11	11
Shay Siada (ISR)	4	7	9

==== Group c ====
Rank	Athlete	Won	Lost	Points diff
1 Q	Rafal Lis (POL)	2	0	+2
2 Q	Choi Ilsang (KOR)	1	1	+19
3	Suleyman Vural (TUR)	0	2	-21

Choi Ilsang (KOR)	11	11	11
Suleyman Vural (TUR)	3	6	3

Choi Ilsang (KOR)	11	8	9	13	9
Rafal Lis (POL)	8	11	11	11	11

Rafal Lis (POL)	W/O
Suleyman Vural (TUR)	

==== Group d ====
Rank	Athlete	Won	Lost	Points diff
1 Q	Maxime Thomas (FRA)	2	0	+27
2 Q	Kim Jung-gil (KOR)	1	1	+9
3	Emmanuel Chinedu Nick (NGR)	0	2	-36

Maxime Thomas (FRA)	11	11	11
Emmanuel Chinedu Nick (NGR)	2	5	8

Maxime Thomas (FRA)	7	11	11	11
Kim Jung-gil (KOR)	11	6	9	5

Kim Jung-gil (KOR)	11	11	11
Emmanuel Chinedu Nick (NGR)	5	5	5

==== Group e ====
Rank	Athlete	Won	Lost	Points diff
1 Q	Nesim Turan (TUR)	2	0	+20
2 Q	Sameh Saleh (EGY)	1	1	+2
3	Edson Gómez (VEN)	0	2	-22

Nesim Turan (TUR)	11	11	11
Edson Gómez (VEN)	4	6	9

Nesim Turan (TUR)	5	11	11	11
Sameh Saleh (EGY)	11	8	4	9

Sameh Saleh (EGY)	9	11	11	11	11
Edson Gómez (VEN)	11	9	6	13	6

==== Group f ====
Rank	Athlete	Won	Lost	Points diff
1 Q	Zhang Yan (CHN)	2	0	+31
2 Q	Wanchai Chaiwut (THA)	1	1	0
3	George Wyndham (SLE)	0	2	-31

Zhang Yan (CHN)	11	11	9	11
George Wyndham (SLE)	2	6	11	5

Zhang Yan (CHN)	11	8	9	11	11
Wanchai Chaiwut (THA)	6	11	11	7	2

Wanchai Chaiwut (THA)	11	11	11
George Wyndham (SLE)	2	9	9
