= Table tennis at the 2012 Summer Paralympics – Men's individual – Class 4 =

Table tennis at the XIV Paralympic Games
- Venue: ExCeL Exhibition Centre
- Dates: 30 August – 3 September 2012
- Competitors: 20 from 13 nations

Medalists
1st place, gold medalist(s)		Kim Young-Gun	South Korea
2nd place, silver medalist(s)		Zhang Yan	China
3rd place, bronze medalist(s)		Sameh Saleh	Egypt

The Men's individual table tennis – Class 4 tournament at the 2012 Summer Paralympics in London took place from 30 August to 3 September 2012 at ExCeL Exhibition Centre. Classes 1-5 were for athletes with a physical impairment that affects their legs, and who competed in a sitting position. The lower the number, the greater the impact the impairment was on an athlete's ability to compete.

In the preliminary stage, athletes competed in six groups of three. Winners of each group qualified for the knock-out stages, together with two seeded players given byes for the preliminary stages.

== Results ==
All times are local (BST/UTC+1)

=== Finals ===
Quarter-finals: 1 Sep 13:15
1	Kim Young Gun (KOR)	11	11	11
Emeric Martin (FRA)	6	5	2
Sameh Saleh (EGY)	11	11	11
Guo Xingyuan (CHN)	6	9	8
Maxime Thomas (FRA)	7	11	11	11
Abdullah Ozturk (TUR)	11	4	6	7
Choi Il Sang (KOR)	11	11	3	4	11
2	Zhang Yan (CHN)	7	6	11	11	13

Semifinals: 1 Sep 19:00
1	Kim Young Gun (KOR)	11	13	6	11
Sameh Saleh (EGY)	6	11	11	7
Maxime Thomas (FRA)	8	12	11	9
2	Zhang Yan (CHN)	11	14	6	11

Gold medal match: 3 Sep 18:45
1	Kim Young Gun (KOR)	14	11	12	11
2	Zhang Yan (CHN)	12	9	14	9
Bronze medal match
Sameh Saleh (EGY)	10	11	11	11
Maxime Thomas (FRA)	12	7	8	8

=== Preliminary round ===
Qualified for the knock-out stages

==== Group A ====
Athlete	Won	Lost	Games diff	Points diff
Maxime Thomas (FRA)	2	0	+4	+20
Tomislav Spalj (CRO)	1	1	0	+2
Werner Burkhardt (GER)	0	2	-4	-22

30 August, 16:00

Maxime Thomas (FRA)	11	11	11
Werner Burkhardt (GER)	0	9	7

31 August, 09:00

Werner Burkhardt (GER)	11	8	10	12	7
Tomislav Spalj (CRO)	9	11	12	10	11

31 August, 16:40

Maxime Thomas (FRA)	8	10	11	11	12
Tomislav Spalj (CRO)	11	12	8	8	10

==== Group B ====
Athlete	Won	Lost	Games diff	Points diff
Guo Xingyuan (CHN)	2	0	+6	+25
Dietmar Kober (GER)	1	1	-1	0
Eziquiel Babes (BRA)	0	2	-5	-25

30 August, 16:00

Guo Xingyuan (CHN)	11	12	11
Eziquiel Babes (BRA)	5	10	4

31 August, 09:00

Eziquiel Babes (BRA)	13	10	11	3
Dietmar Kober (GER)	11	12	13	11

31 August, 16:40

Guo Xingyuan (CHN)	11	11	18
Dietmar Kober (GER)	8	6	16

==== Group C ====
Athlete	Won	Lost	Games diff	Points diff
Choi Il Sang (KOR)	1	1	0	+2
Shay Siada (ISR)	1	1	0	0
Salvatore Caci (ITA)	1	1	0	-2

30 August, 16:00

Choi Il Sang (KOR)	11	11	11
Shay Siada (ISR)	6	8	6

31 August, 09:00

Shay Siada (ISR)	11	11	13
Salvatore Caci (ITA)	4	7	11

31 August, 17:20

Choi Il Sang (KOR)	8	9	5
Salvatore Caci (ITA)	11	11	11

==== Group D ====
Athlete	Won	Lost	Games diff	Points diff
Abdullah Ozturk (TUR)	2	0	+5	+22
Lin Wen-hsin (TPE)	1	1	0	-9
Andrej Mészáros (SVK)	0	2	-5	-13

30 August, 16:00

Abdullah Ozturk (TUR)	11	11	11
Andrej Mészáros (SVK)	9	6	8

31 August, 09:00

Andrej Mészáros (SVK)	8	8	11	10
Lin Wen-hsin (TPE)	11	11	6	12

31 August, 17:20

Abdullah Ozturk (TUR)	11	11	8	11
Lin Wen-hsin (TPE)	9	3	11	6

==== Group E ====
Athlete	Won	Lost	Games diff	Points diff
Emeric Martin (FRA)	2	0	+5	+22
Kim Jung Gil (KOR)	1	1	+1	+8
Ko Kun-nan (TPE)	0	2	-6	-30

30 August, 16:40

Emeric Martin (FRA)	14	11	11
Ko Kun-nan (TPE)	12	4	5

31 August, 09:40

Ko Kun-nan (TPE)	5	7	6
Kim Jung Gil (KOR)	11	11	11

31 August, 17:20

Emeric Martin (FRA)	11	11	5	11
Kim Jung Gil (KOR)	6	9	11	5

==== Group F ====
Athlete	Won	Lost	Games diff	Points diff
Sameh Saleh (EGY)	2	0	+3	+17
Peter Mihálik (SVK)	1	1	0	+2
Edson Gomez (VEN)	0	2	-3	-19

30 August, 16:40

Peter Mihálik (SVK)	11	7	7	11	11
Edson Gomez (VEN)	4	11	11	5	5

31 August, 09:40

Edson Gomez (VEN)	9	11	5	10
Sameh Saleh (EGY)	11	9	11	12

31 August, 17:20

Peter Mihálik (SVK)	11	11	5	7	8
Sameh Saleh (EGY)	9	9	11	11	11
