= Turkey at the 2016 Summer Paralympics =

- IPC code: TUR
- NPC: Turkish Paralympic Committee
- Website: www.tmpk.org.tr (in Turkish)

in Rio de Janeiro
- Competitors: 81 in 15 sports
- Flag bearer: Mesme Taşbağ
- Medals Ranked 33rd: Gold 3 Silver 1 Bronze 5 Total 9

Summer Paralympics appearances (overview)
- 1992; 1996; 2000; 2004; 2008; 2012; 2016; 2020; 2024

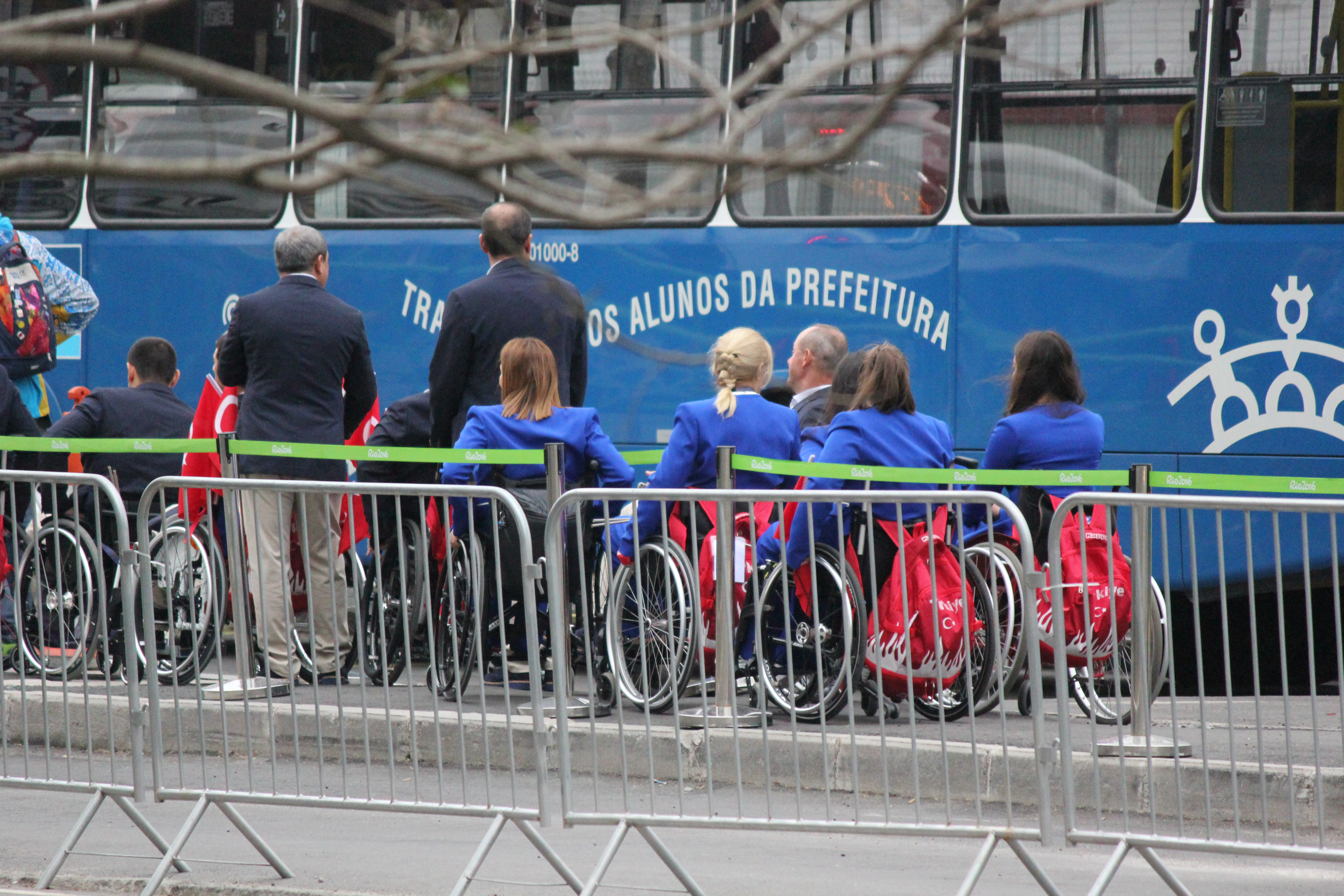
Turkish competitors boarding for transport to the Parade at the Opening Ceremony.

Turkey has qualified to send athletes to the 2016 Summer Paralympics in Rio de Janeiro, Brazil, from 7 September to 18 September 2016. Sports the country qualified to compete in include 5-a-side football, archery, goalball, and wheelchair basketball.

== Medalists ==
| Medal | Name | Sport | Event | Date |
|---|---|---|---|---|
| Gold | Nazmiye Muratlı | Powerlifting | Women's 41 kg | 8 September |
| Gold | Abdullah Öztürk | Table tennis | Men's Individual C4 | 13 September |
| Gold | Neşe Mercan; Seda Yıldız; Sevda Altunoluk; Buket Atalay; Sümeyye Özcan; Gülşah Düzgün | Goalball | Women's tournament | 16 September |
| Silver | Kübra Korkut | Table tennis | Women's Individual C7 | 13 September |
| Bronze | Ecem Taşın | Judo | Women's 48 kg | 8 September |
| Bronze | Ayşegül Pehlivanlar | Shooting | Women's 10m air pistol SH1 | 9 September |
| Bronze | Mesme Taşbağ | Judo | Women's 70 kg | 10 September |
| Bronze | Semih Deniz | Athletics | Men's 1500m | 13 September |
| Bronze | Abdullah Öztürk; Ali Öztürk; Nesim Turan | Table tennis | Men's team – Class 4–5 | 16 September |

Medals by sport
| Sport | 1st place, gold medalist(s) | 2nd place, silver medalist(s) | 3rd place, bronze medalist(s) | Total |
| Athletics | 0 | 0 | 1 | 1 |
| Goalball | 1 | 0 | 0 | 1 |
| Judo | 0 | 0 | 2 | 2 |
| Powerlifting | 1 | 0 | 0 | 1 |
| Shooting | 0 | 0 | 1 | 1 |
| Table tennis | 1 | 1 | 1 | 3 |
| Total | 3 | 1 | 5 | 9 |

Medals by gender
| Gender | 1st place, gold medalist(s) | 2nd place, silver medalist(s) | 3rd place, bronze medalist(s) | Total |
| Male | 1 | 0 | 2 | 3 |
| Female | 2 | 1 | 3 | 6 |
| Total | 3 | 1 | 5 | 9 |

== Competitors ==
The following is the list of number of competitors participating in the Games:

| Sport | Men | Women | Total |
|---|---|---|---|
| Archery | 5 | 3 | 8 |
| Athletics | 3 | 7 | 10 |
| Football 5-a-side | 10 | 0 | 10 |
| Goalball | 6 | 6 | 12 |
| Judo | 2 | 2 | 4 |
| Powerlifting | 0 | 3 | 3 |
| Shooting | 5 | 4 | 9 |
| Swimming | 1 | 2 | 3 |
| Table Tennis | 4 | 5 | 9 |
| Wheelchair Basketball | 12 | 0 | 12 |
| Wheelchair Tennis | 0 | 1 | 1 |
| Total | 48 | 33 | 81 |

== Disability classifications ==
Every participant at the Paralympics has their disability grouped into one of five disability categories; amputation, the condition may be congenital or sustained through injury or illness; cerebral palsy; wheelchair athletes, there is often overlap between this and other categories; visual impairment, including blindness; Les autres, any physical disability that does not fall strictly under one of the other categories, for example dwarfism or multiple sclerosis. Each Paralympic sport then has its own classifications, dependent upon the specific physical demands of competition. Events are given a code, made of numbers and letters, describing the type of event and classification of the athletes competing. Some sports, such as athletics, divide athletes by both the category and severity of their disabilities, other sports, for example swimming, group competitors from different categories together, the only separation being based on the severity of the disability.

== Administration and support ==
As of January 2016, the country had qualified 37 vision impaired athletes for Rio. The Games will be the first where Turkey sends teams in all vision impaired team sports.

== 5-a-side football ==
Turkey qualified for the Paralympics after finishing first at the 2015 IBSA Blind Football European Championships. They made it out of group play in second, with England having won the group after not dropping a game. Turkey dropped their game against England 1 - 2, with the English side goals coming from Turnham and English while the Turkish goal came from Hasan Şatay. In elimination play, Şatay and Abdullah Sümer scored two goals in penalty time after their game against Spain ended in 0 - 0 draw. Turkey then met Russia in the gold medal match, where Kahraman Gurbetoğlu scored to give Turkey a 1 - 0 win.

The following is the Turkey squad in the football 5-a-side tournament of the 2016 Summer Paralympics.

| No. | Pos. | Player | Class | Date of birth (age) |
|---|---|---|---|---|
| 1 | GK | Ali Aktaş | Sighted | 11 March 1986 (aged 30) |
| 4 | FW | Kahraman Kurbetoğlu | B1 | 21 April 1984 (aged 32) |
| 5 | FW | Recep Aydeniz | B1 | 20 December 1995 (aged 20) |
| 6 | FW | Abullah Sümer | B1 | 20 January 1993 (aged 23) |
| 7 | FW | Emrah Öcal | B1 | 22 February 1988 (aged 28) |
| 8 | DF | Ibrahim Üzüm | B1 | 1 April 1989 (aged 27) |
| 9 | MF | Ercan Bayraktar | B1 | 30 January 1988 (aged 28) |
| 10 | MF | Celal Çoban | B1 | 24 June 1993 (aged 23) |
| 11 | FW | Hasan Şatay | B1 | 8 October 1994 (aged 21) |
| 12 | GK | Aykut Akyon | Sighted | 4 April 1993 (aged 23) |

| Pos | Team | Pld | W | D | L | GF | GA | GD | Pts | Qualification |
|---|---|---|---|---|---|---|---|---|---|---|
| 1 | Brazil (H) | 3 | 2 | 1 | 0 | 5 | 1 | +4 | 7 | Semi finals |
| 2 | Iran | 3 | 1 | 2 | 0 | 2 | 0 | +2 | 5 | Semi finals |
| 3 | Turkey | 3 | 0 | 2 | 1 | 1 | 3 | −2 | 2 | 5th–6th place match |
| 4 | Morocco | 3 | 0 | 1 | 2 | 2 | 6 | −4 | 1 | 7th–8th place match |

Source: Paralympic.org
(H) Hosts
9 September 2016
16:00

| Turkey | 0–0 | Iran |
|---|---|---|
| | Report |

Olympic Tennis Centre, Rio de Janeiro
Attendance: 2,811
Referee: Lucio Morgado (Brazil)

11 September 2016
16:00

| Brazil | 2–0 | Turkey |
|---|---|---|
| Ricardinho 13'; Cássio 37' (pen.) | Report |

Olympic Tennis Centre, Rio de Janeiro
Attendance: 2,596
Referee: François Carcouët (France)

13 September 2016
16:00

| Morocco | 1–1 | Turkey |
|---|---|---|
| Snisla 27' | Report | Öcal 25' |

Olympic Tennis Centre, Rio de Janeiro
Attendance: 1,933
Referee: Germi Guimaraes (Brazil)

5th–6th place match

15 September 2016
11:00

| Turkey | 0–0 | Spain |
|---|---|---|
| | Report |
Penalties
| Sümer (penalty scored); Şatay (penalty missed); Öcal (penalty missed) | 1–0 | (penalty missed) El Haddaqui; (penalty missed) Muñoz; (penalty missed) Garrido |

Olympic Tennis Centre, Rio de Janeiro
Attendance: 971
Referee: Stuart Winton (Great Britain)

== Archery ==
Turkey qualified three archers for the Rio Games following their performance at the 2015 World Archery Para Championships. The spots are all in the compound open, with 2 spots for men and 1 spot for a woman. Bülent Korkmaz earned Turkey's first spot in the men's compound open, with Erdoğan Aygan earning the second men's spot. Handan Biroğlu earned the women's spot after defeating Ireland's Kerrie-Louise Leonard to qualify for the quarterfinals.

Men

| Athlete | Event | Ranking round | | Round of 32 | Round of 16 | Quarterfinals | Semifinals | Finals | |
| Athlete | Event | Score | Seed | Opposition score | Opposition score | Opposition score | Opposition score | Opposition score | Rank |
|---|---|---|---|---|---|---|---|---|---|
| Sadık Savaş | Individual Recurve Open | 545 | 31 | Netsiri (THA); L 2–6 | Did Not Advance | | | | |
| Erdoğan Aygan | Ind. compound | 663 | 17 | Cao (CHN); W 143–142 | Korkmaz (TUR); L 137–137 | Did Not Advance | | | |
| Bülent Korkmaz | Ind. compound | 687 PR | 1 | Bye | Aygan (TUR); W 137–137 | Milne (AUS); L 138–139 | Did Not Advance | | |
| Naci Yenier | Individual compound W1 | 637 | 4 | Bye | Azzolini (ITA); W 138–131 | Walker (GBR); L 128–131 | Did Not Advance | | |
| Ömer Aşık | Individual compound W1 | 648 PR | 1 | —N/a | Bye | Herter (GER); L 124–130 | Did Not Advance | | |

Women

| Athlete | Event | Ranking round | | Round of 32 | Round of 16 | Quarterfinals | Semifinals | Finals | |
| Athlete | Event | Score | Seed | Opposition score | Opposition score | Opposition score | Opposition score | Opposition score | Rank |
|---|---|---|---|---|---|---|---|---|---|
| Zehra Özbey Torun | Individual Recurve Open | 582 | 14 | Sidkova (CZE); W 6–4 | Ye (CHN); W 6–2 | Lee (KOR); L 3–7 | Did Not Advance | | 5 |
| Merve Nur Eroğlu | Individual Recurve Open | 603 | 9 | Kohansal (IRI); L 2–6 | Did Not Advance | | | | |
| Handan Biroğlu | Ind. compound | 648 | 8 | —N/a | Markitantova (UKR); W 139–137 | Zhou (CHN); L 132–144 | Did Not Advance | | 5 |

Mixed

| Athlete | Event | Ranking round | | Round of 32 | Round of 16 | Quarterfinals | Semifinals | Finals | |
| Athlete | Event | Score | Seed | Opposition score | Opposition score | Opposition score | Opposition score | Opposition score | Rank |
|---|---|---|---|---|---|---|---|---|---|
| Sadık Savaş; Merve Nur Eroğlu | Team Recurve Open | 1148 | 10 | —N/a | Thailand (THA); L 3–5 | Did Not Advance | | | 9 |
| Bülent Korkmaz; Handan Biroğlu | Team Compound Open | 1335 | 3 | —N/a | Bye | Brazil (BRA); W 147–145 | China (CHN); L 139–149 | South Korea (KOR); L 128–138 | 4 |

== Athletics ==
Men
Track events

| Athlete | Event | Classification | Heat | | Final | |
| Athlete | Event | Classification | Time | Rank | Time | Rank |
|---|---|---|---|---|---|---|
| Semih Deniz | 1500m | T11 | 4:11.74 | 1 Q | 4:05.42 | 3rd place, bronze medalist(s) |
| Hasan Hüseyin Kaçar | 1500m | T11 | DSQ | | Did not advance | |
| Hasan Hüseyin Kaçar | 5000m | T11 | —N/a | | 15:49.52 | 4 |
| Mehmet Tunç | 200m | T11 | DSQ | | Did not advance | |
| Mehmet Tunç | 400m | T11 | 53.19 | 7 | Did not advance | |

Field events

| Athlete | Event | Classification | Final | |
| Athlete | Event | Classification | Distance | Position |
|---|---|---|---|---|
| Mehmet Tunç | Long Jump | T11 | 5.66 | 8 |

Women
Track events

| Athlete | Event | Classification | Heat | | Final | |
| Athlete | Event | Classification | Time | Rank | Time | Rank |
|---|---|---|---|---|---|---|
| Zeynep Acet | 100m | T53 | 19.26 | 5 | Did not advance | |
| Zeynep Acet | 400m | T53 | 1:08.72 | 7 | Did not advance | |
| Hamide Kurt | 100m | T53 | 17.09 | 3 Q | 17.01 | 4 |
| Hamide Kurt | 400m | T53 | 56.72 | 3 Q | 57.61 | 6 |
| Hamide Kurt | 800m | T52/53 | 1:50.33 | 5 Q | 1:52.78 | 8 |
| Zübeyde Süpürgeci | 100m | T54 | 17.93 | 5 | Did not advance | |
| Zübeyde Süpürgeci | 400m | T54 | 1:04.29 | 6 | Did not advance | |
| Zübeyde Süpürgeci | 800m | T54 | 2:07.63 | 7 | Did not advance | |
| Zeynep Acet; Nurşah Usta; Hamide Kurt; Zübeyde Süpürgeci | 4 × 400 m | T53/54 | —N/a | —N/a | DSQ | |
| Öznur Alumur | 1500m | T11 | 5:14.19 | 4 | Did not advance | |

Field events

| Athlete | Event | Classification | Final | |
| Athlete | Event | Classification | Distance | Position |
|---|---|---|---|---|
| Büşra Nur Tırıklı | Discus throw | F11 | 25.65 | 8 |
| Mihriban Kaya | Shot put | F20 | 10.16 | 11 |

== Goalball ==
=== Men ===
Turkey's men enter the tournament ranked fourth in the world.

The following is the Turkey roster in the men's goalball tournament of the 2016 Summer Paralympics.

| No. | Player | Class | Date of birth (age) |
|---|---|---|---|
| 1 | Hüseyin Alkan | B1 | 1 April 1988 (aged 28) |
| 3 | Sercan Kaya | B1 | 1 June 1991 (aged 25) |
| 4 | Ekrem Gündoğdu | B1 | 26 October 1990 (aged 25) |
| 5 | Abdullah Aydoğdu | B3 | 27 September 1991 (aged 24) |
| 6 | Yunus Emre Akyüz | B2 | 3 May 1993 (aged 23) |
| 7 | Tuncay Karakaya | B1 | 1 October 1989 (aged 26) |

Pool B

| Pos | Team | Pld | W | D | L | GF | GA | GD | Pts | Qualification |
|---|---|---|---|---|---|---|---|---|---|---|
| 1 | Lithuania | 4 | 4 | 0 | 0 | 35 | 22 | +13 | 12 | Quarter-finals |
| 2 | United States | 4 | 2 | 0 | 2 | 21 | 18 | +3 | 6 | Quarter-finals |
| 3 | Turkey | 4 | 2 | 0 | 2 | 20 | 23 | −3 | 6 | Quarter-finals |
| 4 | China | 4 | 1 | 0 | 3 | 25 | 28 | −3 | 3 | Quarter-finals |
| 5 | Finland | 4 | 1 | 0 | 3 | 24 | 34 | −10 | 3 | |

Source: Paralympic.org

| 10 September 2016; 09:00 | Turkey | 8–5 | Finland | Future Arena, Rio de Janeiro; Referees: Alexander Knecht (GER), Rudi Janssen (BEL) |
| 10 September 2016; 09:00 | Gündoğdu 6 Alkan 1 Karakaya 1 | Report | Mattila 5 | Future Arena, Rio de Janeiro; Referees: Alexander Knecht (GER), Rudi Janssen (BEL) |

| 11 September 2016; 13:15 | China | 10–3 | Turkey | Future Arena, Rio de Janeiro; Referees: Vilma Basinkaite (LTU), Patricia Fras (SLO) |
| 11 September 2016; 13:15 | Chen 4 Cai 4 Hu 1 Shao 1 | Report | Karakaya 2 Gündoğdu 1 | Future Arena, Rio de Janeiro; Referees: Vilma Basinkaite (LTU), Patricia Fras (SLO) |

| 12 September 2016; 19:30 | United States | 3–6 | Turkey | Future Arena, Rio de Janeiro; Referees: Raili Sipura (FIN), Daniel Voltan (BRA) |
| 12 September 2016; 19:30 | Kusku 1 Merren 1 Jenks 1 | Report | Gündoğdu 4 Karakaya 2 | Future Arena, Rio de Janeiro; Referees: Raili Sipura (FIN), Daniel Voltan (BRA) |

| 13 September 2016; 20:45 | Turkey | 3–5 | Lithuania | Future Arena, Rio de Janeiro; Referees: Nejc Jakic (SLO), Daniel Voltan (BRA) |
| 13 September 2016; 20:45 | Karakaya 2 Gündoğdu 1 | Report | Panovas 2 Pavliukianec 1 Pazarauskas 1 Montvydas 1 | Future Arena, Rio de Janeiro; Referees: Nejc Jakic (SLO), Daniel Voltan (BRA) |

Quarter-Finals

| 14 September 2016; 21:00 | Sweden | 5–1 | Turkey | Future Arena, Rio de Janeiro; Referees: Nejc Jakic (SLO), Yoshinori Nii (JPN) |
| 14 September 2016; 21:00 | Seremeti 2 Weichel 2 Björkstrand 1 | Report | Akyüz | Future Arena, Rio de Janeiro; Referees: Nejc Jakic (SLO), Yoshinori Nii (JPN) |

=== Women ===
The Turkey women's national goalball team qualified for the Rio Games after finishing third at the 2014 IBSA Goalball World Championships. They defeated Japan in the bronze medal game to qualify. Turkey's assistant coach Eren Yıldırım said after his team qualified, "We had a nightmare in the semi-final against Russia (a 2-1 defeat). But our main aim was a place at Rio 2016 and we managed to recuperate and focus on this. We’re really pleased.” Turkey's women enter the tournament ranked fifth in the world.

The following is the Turkey roster in the women's goalball tournament of the 2016 Summer Paralympics.

| No. | Player | Class | Date of birth (age) |
|---|---|---|---|
| 1 | Neşe Mercan | B2 | 19 September 1994 (aged 21) |
| 2 | Seda Yıldız | B3 | 7 December 1998 (aged 17) |
| 3 | Sevda Altunoluk | B2 | 1 April 1994 (aged 22) |
| 4 | Gülşah Düzgün | B2 | 25 September 1995 (aged 20) |
| 6 | Buket Atalay | B2 | 14 August 1990 (aged 26) |
| 7 | Sümeyye Özcan | B1 | 15 January 1992 (aged 24) |

Pool D

| Pos | Team | Pld | W | D | L | GF | GA | GD | Pts | Qualification |
|---|---|---|---|---|---|---|---|---|---|---|
| 1 | Turkey | 4 | 4 | 0 | 0 | 37 | 11 | +26 | 12 | Quarter-finals |
| 2 | China | 4 | 3 | 0 | 1 | 21 | 14 | +7 | 9 | Quarter-finals |
| 3 | Canada | 4 | 2 | 0 | 2 | 16 | 22 | −6 | 6 | Quarter-finals |
| 4 | Ukraine | 4 | 0 | 1 | 3 | 9 | 17 | −8 | 1 | Quarter-finals |
| 5 | Australia | 4 | 0 | 1 | 3 | 6 | 25 | −19 | 1 | |

Source: Paralympic.org

| 9 September 2016; 10:15 | Turkey | 12–4 | Canada | Future Arena, Rio de Janeiro; Referees: Raili Sipura (FIN), Alexander Knecht (GER) |
| 9 September 2016; 10:15 | Altunoluk 8 Özcan 2 Mercan 2 | Report | Burk 4 | Future Arena, Rio de Janeiro; Referees: Raili Sipura (FIN), Alexander Knecht (GER) |

| 10 September 2016; 14:30 | China | 2–7 | Turkey | Future Arena, Rio de Janeiro; Referees: Dawna Christy (CAN), Nejc Jakic (SLO) |
| 10 September 2016; 14:30 | Zhang W. 1 Ju 1 | Report | Altunoluk 7 | Future Arena, Rio de Janeiro; Referees: Dawna Christy (CAN), Nejc Jakic (SLO) |

| 11 September 2016; 18:45 | Australia | 2–12 | Turkey | Future Arena, Rio de Janeiro; Referees: Joelle Boulet (CAN), Raili Sipura (FIN) |
| 11 September 2016; 18:45 | Horsburgh 2 | Report | Özcan 5 Mercan 5 Yıldız 1 Altunoluk 1 | Future Arena, Rio de Janeiro; Referees: Joelle Boulet (CAN), Raili Sipura (FIN) |

| 12 September 2016; 20:45 | Turkey | 6–3 | Ukraine | Future Arena, Rio de Janeiro; Referees: Rudi Janssen (BEL), Nejc Jakic (SLO) |
| 12 September 2016; 20:45 | Mercan 2 Altunoluk 2 Özcan 1 Yıldız 1 | Report | Rud 2 Govorukha 1 | Future Arena, Rio de Janeiro; Referees: Rudi Janssen (BEL), Nejc Jakic (SLO) |

Quarter-Finals

| 14 September 2016; 15:45 | Turkey | 15–5 | Israel | Future Arena, Rio de Janeiro; Referees: Dawna Christy (CAN), Raquel Aguado (ESP) |
| 14 September 2016; 15:45 | Altunoluk 7 Özcan 4 Mercan 3 Ben-David 1 (o.g.) | Report | Ben-David 5 | Future Arena, Rio de Janeiro; Referees: Dawna Christy (CAN), Raquel Aguado (ESP) |

Semi-Finals

| 15 September 2016; 20:00 | Turkey | 11–1 | United States | Future Arena, Rio de Janeiro; Referees: Vilma Basinkaite (LTU), Nejc Jakic (SLO) |
| 15 September 2016; 20:00 | Altunoluk 8 Yıldız 2 Özcan 1 | Report | Miller 1 | Future Arena, Rio de Janeiro; Referees: Vilma Basinkaite (LTU), Nejc Jakic (SLO) |

Final

| 16 September 2016; 18:30 | China | 1–4 | Turkey | Future Arena, Rio de Janeiro; Referees: Vilma Basinkaite (LTU), Raili Sipura (FIN) |
| 16 September 2016; 18:30 | Chen 1 | Report | Altunoluk 3 Yıldız 1 | Future Arena, Rio de Janeiro; Referees: Vilma Basinkaite (LTU), Raili Sipura (FIN) |

== Judo ==
| Athlete | Event | First round | Quarter-final | Semi-final | First repechage round | Repechage semi-final | Final | |
| Athlete | Event | Opposition Result | Opposition Result | Opposition Result | Opposition Result | Opposition Result | Opposition Result | Rank |
|---|---|---|---|---|---|---|---|---|
| İbrahim Bölükbaşı | Men's 100 kg | Papachristos (GRE); W 0100–0000 | Sharipov (UZB); L 0001–0100 | —N/a | Bye | Skelley (GBR); L 0001–0002 | Did not advance | 7 |
| Dursun Hayran | Men's +100 kg | Masaki (JPN); L 0000–0100 | —N/a | —N/a | Hodgson (GBR); L 0000–0101 | Did not advance | | 11 |
| Ecem Taşın | Women's 48 kg | —N/a | Brussig (GER); L 0000–1000 | Did not advance | Bye | Cardoso (BRA); W 1000–0000 | Lee (TPE); W 0010–0002 | 3rd place, bronze medalist(s) |
| Mesme Taşbağ | Women's +70 kg | —N/a | Yuan (CHN); L 0000–0111 | —N/a | Chung (USA); W 0100–0000 | —N/a | Kachan (BLR); W 0003–0001 | 3rd place, bronze medalist(s) |

== Powerlifting ==
Women

| Athlete | Event | Result | Rank |
|---|---|---|---|
| Sibel Cam | -55 kg | 85 | 9 |
| Nazmiye Muratlı | -41 kg | 104 | 1st place, gold medalist(s) |
| Dilfiroz Kuzdağı | -67 kg | 0 | 6 |

== Shooting ==
The first opportunity to qualify for shooting at the Rio Games took place at the 2014 IPC Shooting World Championships in Suhl. Shooters earned spots for their NPC. Turkey earned a qualifying spot at this event in the R2 – 10m Air Rifle standing women SH1 event as a result of Çağla Baş winning a silver medal. Cevat Karagöl gave Turkey another spot in the P1 – 10m Air Pistol Men SH1 event after winning a bronze medal.

The country sent shooters to 2015 IPC Shooting World Cup in Osijek, Croatia, where Rio direct qualification was also available. They earned a qualifying spot at this event based on the performance of Muharrem Korhan Yamaç in the P4 – 50m Pistol Mixed SH1 event.

The third opportunity for direct qualification for shooters to the Rio Paralympics took place at the 2015 IPC Shooting World Cup in Sydney, Australia. At this competition, Savaş Üstün earned a qualifying spot for their country in the R3 - Mixed 10m Air Rifle Prone SH1 event.

The last direct qualifying event for Rio in shooting took place at the 2015 IPC Shooting World Cup in Fort Benning, USA in November. Ayşegül Pehlivanlar earned a qualifying spot for their country at this competition in the P2 Women's 10m Air Pistol SH1 event. Murat Oğuz earned a second qualifying spot for Turkey at this competition in the P4 Mixed 50m Pistol SH1 event. Because no women qualified in the P3 Mixed 25m Pistol SH1 event, the spot for women was reallocated to P4 Mixed 50m Pistol SH1, which Turkey's Aysel Özgan claimed for her country. Hakan Çevik claimed another spot for Turkey with his performance in the R5 Mixed 10m Air Pistol Prone SH2 event.

Men

| Athlete | Event | Qualification | | Final | |
| Athlete | Event | Points | Rank | Points | Rank |
|---|---|---|---|---|---|
| Cevat Karagöl | Men's P1-10m air pistol | 548-12x | 28 | Did not advance | |
| Cevat Karagöl | Mixed P4-50m air pistol | 538-3x | 2 | 80.2 | 7 |
| Hakan Çevik | Mixed R4-10m air rifle standing | 624.1 | 19 | Did not advance | |
| Hakan Çevik | Mixed R5-10m air rifle prone | 631.9 | 14 | Did not advance | |
| Muharrem Korhan Yamaç | Men's P1-10m air pistol | 560-12x | 7 | 71.7 | 8 |
| Muharrem Korhan Yamaç | Mixed P3-25m air pistol | 563-14x | 10 | Did not advance | |
| Muharrem Korhan Yamaç | Mixed P4-50m air pistol | 521-5x | 15 | Did not advance | |
| Murat Oğuz | Men's P1-10m air pistol | 554-11x | 20 | Did not advance | |
| Murat Oğuz | Mixed P3-25m air pistol | DND | 31 | Did not advance | |
| Savaş Üstün | Men's R1-10m air rifle standing | 604.1 | 17 | Did not advance | |
| Savaş Üstün | Men's R3-10m air rifle prone | 627.9 | 26 | Did not advance | |
| Savaş Üstün | Men's R6-50m air rifle 3 positions | 606.1 | 28 | Did not advance | |

Women

| Athlete | Event | Qualification | | Final | |
| Athlete | Event | Points | Rank | Points | Rank |
|---|---|---|---|---|---|
| Aysel Özgan | Women's P2-10m air pistol | 366-5x | 7 | 110.1 | 6 |
| Aysel Özgan | Mixed P4-50m air pistol | 505-7x | 25 | Did not advance | |
| Ayşegül Pehlivanlar | Women's P2-10m air pistol | 368-4x | 6 | 172.3 | 3rd place, bronze medalist(s) |
| Çağla Atakal | Women's R2-10m air rifle standing | 400.2 | 13 | Did not advance | |
| Çağla Atakal | Mixed R3-10m air rifle prone | 619.1 | 39 | Did not advance | |
| Suzan Çevik | Women's R2-10m air rifle standing | 402.7 | 9 | Did not advance | |
| Suzan Çevik | Mixed R3-10m air rifle prone | 617.7 | 43 | Did not advance | |

Qualification Legend: Q = Qualify for the next round; q = Qualify for the bronze medal (shotgun)

== Swimming ==
=== Men ===
| Athletes | Event | Heat | | Final | |
| Athletes | Event | Time | Rank | Time | Rank |
|---|---|---|---|---|---|
| Beytullah Eroğlu | 50 m butterfly S5 | 38.61 | 4 Q | 38.75 | 5 |
| Beytullah Eroğlu | 50 m backstroke S5 | 40.57 | 2 Q | 41.31 | 6 |

=== Women ===
| Athletes | Event | Heat | | Final | |
| Athletes | Event | Time | Rank | Time | Rank |
|---|---|---|---|---|---|
| Sümeyye Boyacı | 50 m backstroke S5 | | | 50.34 | 8 |
| Özlem Kaya | 50 m freestyle S6 | 39.20 | 6 | Did Not Advance | |
| Özlem Kaya | 50 m butterfly S6 | 40.65 | 3 Q | 40.60 | 6 |
| Özlem Kaya | 100 m breaststroke SB6 | 1:52.15 | 5 | Did Not Advance | |
| Sevilay Öztürk | 100 m butterfly S5 | 49.94 | 4 Q | 50.89 | 8 |

== Table Tennis ==
Men's individual

| Athlete | Event | Group stage | | | Round 1 | Quarterfinals | Semifinals | Final | |
| Athlete | Event | Opposition Result | Opposition Result | Rank | Opposition Result | Opposition Result | Opposition Result | Opposition Result | Rank |
|---|---|---|---|---|---|---|---|---|---|
| Abdullah Öztürk | Individual C4 | Shay Siada (ISR); W 3-0 | Guo Xingyuan (CHN); W 3-1 | 1 Q | Bye | Choi Ilsang (KOR); W 3-2 | Maxime Thomas (FRA); W 3-2 | Xingyuan Guo (CHN); W 3-1 | 1st place, gold medalist(s) |
| Nesim Turan | Individual C4 | Edson Gómez (VEN); W 3-0 | Sameh Saleh (EGY); W 3-1 | 1 Q | Kim Jung-gil (KOR); W 3-1 | Rafal Lis (POL); W 3-2 | Xingyuan Guo (CHN); L 1-3 | Maxime Thomas (FRA); L 0-3 | 4 |
| Süleyman Vural | Individual C4 | Choi Ilsang (KOR); L 0-3 | Rafal Lis (POL); L 0-3 | 3 | Did Not Advance | | | | |
| Ali Öztürk | Individual C5 | Hassaan Tolba (EGY); L 0-3 | Lin Yen-hung (TPE); L 2-3 | 3 | Did Not Advance | | | | |

Men's team

| Athlete | Event | Round of 16 | Quarterfinals | Semifinals | Final | |
| Athlete | Event | Opposition Result | Opposition Result | Opposition Result | Opposition Result | Rank |
|---|---|---|---|---|---|---|
| Abdullah Öztürk; Ali Öztürk; Nesim Turan | Team C4-5 | Bye | Nigeria (NGR); W 2-0 | Chinese Taipei (TPE); L 0-2 | China (CHN); W 2-1 | 3rd place, bronze medalist(s) |

Women's individual

| Athlete | Event | Group stage | | | | Quarterfinals | Semifinals | Final | |
| Athlete | Event | Opposition Result | Opposition Result | Opposition Result | Rank | Opposition Result | Opposition Result | Opposition Result | Rank |
|---|---|---|---|---|---|---|---|---|---|
| Hatice Duman | Individual C3 | Li Qian (CHN); L 0-3 | Lara Campbell (GBR); W 3-2 | —N/a | 2 Q | Andela Muzinic (CRO); L 1-3 | Did Not Advance | | |
| Nergis Altıntaş | Individual C4 | Zhou Ying (CHN); W 0-3 | Oejeong Kang (KOR); W 3-2 | —N/a | 2 Q | Zhang Miao (CHN); L 0-3 | Did Not Advance | | |
| Kübra Korkut | Individual C7 | Faiza Mahmoud (EGY); W 3-0 | Kelly Van Zon (NED); L 1-3 | Giselle Munoz (ARG); W 3-0 | 2 Q | —N/a | Kim Seong-Ok (KOR); W 3-1 | Kelly Van Zon (NED); L 0-3 | 2nd place, silver medalist(s) |
| Neslihan Kavas | Individual C9 | Jennyfer Marques Parinos (BRA); W 3-0 | Lina Lei (CHN); L 1-3 | Liu Meng (CHN); L 2-3 | 3 | Did Not Advance | | | |
| Ümran Ertiş | Individual C10 | Melissa Tapper (AUS); L 1-3 | Sophie Walloe (DEN); L 0-3 | Natalia Partyka (POL); L 0-3 | 3 | Did Not Advance | | | |

Women's team

| Athlete | Event | Round of 16 | Quarterfinals | Semifinals | Final | |
| Athlete | Event | Opposition Result | Opposition Result | Opposition Result | Opposition Result | Rank |
|---|---|---|---|---|---|---|
| Hatice Duman; Nergis Altıntaş | Team C4-5 | Israel (ISR); W 2-0 | China (CHN); L 1-3 | Did Not Advance | | |
| Neslihan Kavas; Ümran Ertiş; Kübra Korkut | Team C6-10 | Bye | Australia (AUS); L 0-2 | Did Not Advance | | |

== Wheelchair basketball ==
The Turkey men's national wheelchair basketball team has qualified for the 2016 Rio Paralympics.

During the draw, Brazil had the choice of which group they wanted to be in. They were partnered with Spain, who would be in the group Brazil did not select. Brazil chose Group B, which included Iran, the United States, Great Britain, Germany and Algeria. That left Spain in Group A with Australia, Canada, Turkey, the Netherlands and Japan.

Group A

| Pos | Team | Pld | W | L | PF | PA | PD | Pts | Qualification |
|---|---|---|---|---|---|---|---|---|---|
| 1 | Spain | 5 | 4 | 1 | 341 | 265 | +76 | 9 (Note: Head-to-head record: Spain 3 pts, +8 PD; Turkey 3 pts, +1 PD; Japan 3 pts, −9 PD) | Quarter-finals |
| 2 | Turkey | 5 | 4 | 1 | 327 | 272 | +55 | 9 | Quarter-finals |
| 3 | Australia | 5 | 4 | 1 | 342 | 293 | +49 | 9 | Quarter-finals |
| 4 | Netherlands | 5 | 2 | 3 | 264 | 294 | −30 | 7 | Quarter-finals |
| 5 | Japan | 5 | 1 | 4 | 278 | 300 | −22 | 6 | 9th/10th place playoff |
| 6 | Canada | 5 | 0 | 5 | 222 | 350 | −128 | 5 | 11th/12th place playoff |

Source: Paralympic.org
Rules for classification: 1) Points; 2) Head-to-head results; 3) Points difference; 4) Points scored.
Notes:

8 September 2016
15:45

Report

| Turkey | 65–49 | Japan |
Scoring by quarter: 18–16, 13–9, 16–16, 18–8
| Pts: Gürbulak 25; Rebs: Gümüş 11; Asts: Gürbulak 10 | | Pts: Fujimoto 22; Rebs: Fujimoto 8 Asts: Kozai 10 |

Carioca Arena 1, Rio de Janeiro
Referees: Cristian Roja

9 September 2016
12:15

Report

| Australia | 62–60 | Turkey |
Scoring by quarter: 17–20, 17–13, 12–17, 16–10
| Pts: Knowles 17; Rebs: Norris 11; Asts: Knowles 9 | | Pts: Gürbulak 27; Rebs: Gürbulak 13; Asts: Gürbulak 12 |

Carioca Arena 1, Rio de Janeiro
Referees: Carsten Rehling

10 September 2016
10:30

Report

| Spain | 65–68 | Turkey |
Scoring by quarter: 20–21, 16–13, 14–15, 15–19
| Pts: A. Zarzuela, P. Zarzuela 18; Rebs: A. Zarzuela 11; Asts: García 14 | | Pts: Gürbulak 39; Rebs: Gezinci, Gümüş 6 Asts: Gürbulak 8 |

Carioca Arena 1, Rio de Janeiro
Referees: Max Kindervater

11 September 2016
11:45

Report

| Turkey | 67–50 | Netherlands |
Scoring by quarter: 21–15, 16–8, 12–8, 18–10
| Pts: Dalay, Gümüş 18; Rebs: Gümüş 7 Asts: Gürbulak 11 | | Pts: Korkmaz 12; Rebs: Poggenwisch 8 Asts: Poggenwisch 10 |

Carioca Arena 1, Rio de Janeiro
Referees: Bill Kuerzi

12 September 2016
19:30

Report

| Canada | 46–67 | Turkey |
Scoring by quarter: 9–14, 15–15, 13–22, 9–16
| Pts: Eng 15; Rebs: Goncin 8 Asts: Goncin 7 | | Pts: Gürbulak 24; Rebs: Gezinci, Gümüş 7 Asts: Gürbulak 10 |

Rio Olympic Arena, Rio de Janeiro
Referees: Max Kindervater

Quarter-Finals

14 September 2016
21:00

Report

| Turkey | 65–49 | Brazil |
Scoring by quarter: 19–8, 20–12, 14–14, 12–15
| Pts: Gürbulak 17; Rebs: Gümüş 10; Asts: Gürbulak 11 | | Pts: Candido Sanchez 18; Rebs: De Miranda 9 Asts: Candido Sanchez 4 |

Rio Olympic Arena, Rio de Janeiro
Referees: Sabastien Gauthier

Semi-Finals

15 September 2016
21:00

Report

| Turkey | 54–74 | United States |
Scoring by quarter: 19–20, 8–17, 9–17, 18–20
| Pts: Gürbulak 13; Rebs: Gürbulak 10; Asts: Gürbulak 11 | | Pts: Serio 17; Rebs: Serio 7 Asts: Serio 9 |

Rio Olympic Arena, Rio de Janeiro
Referees: Linas Radykas

3rd Place

17 September 2016
11:45

Report

| Great Britain | 82–76 (OT) | Turkey |
Scoring by quarter: 16–22, 13–8, 14–19, 22–16, Overtime: 17–11
| Pts: Bywater 25; Rebs: Sagar 11; Asts: Pratt 12 | | Pts: Gürbulak 24; Rebs: Gürbulak 10; Asts: Gürbulak 19 |

Rio Olympic Arena, Rio de Janeiro
Referees: Krunoslav Peic

== Wheelchair tennis ==
Busra Un qualified for Rio in the women's singles event as a result of a Bipartite Commission Invitation place.

| Athlete | Event | Round of 64 | Round of 32 | Round of 16 | Quarterfinals | Semifinals | Final / BM | |
| Athlete | Event | Opposition Score | Opposition Score | Opposition Score | Opposition Score | Opposition Score | Opposition Score | Rank |
|---|---|---|---|---|---|---|---|---|
| Büşra Ün | Women's singles | Mayara (BRA); L 0-2 | Did not advance | | | | | |

== See also ==
- Turkey at the 2016 Summer Olympics
