= Table tennis at the 2020 Summer Paralympics – Men's individual – Class 4 =

Table tennis at the XVI Paralympic Games
- Venue: Tokyo Metropolitan Gymnasium
- Dates: 25–30 August 2021
- Competitors: 18 from 13 nations

Medalists
1st place, gold medalist(s)		Abdullah Ozturk	Turkey
2nd place, silver medalist(s)		Kim Young-gun	South Korea
3rd place, bronze medalist(s)		Maxime Thomas	France
3rd place, bronze medalist(s)		Nesim Turan	Turkey

The Men's individual table tennis – Class 4 tournament at the 2020 Summer Paralympics in Tokyo took place between 25 and 30 August 2021 at Tokyo Metropolitan Gymnasium. Classes 1–5 were for athletes with a physical impairment that affected their legs, and who competed in a sitting position. The lower the number, the greater the impact the impairment was on an athlete's ability to compete.

In the preliminary stage, athletes competed in seven groups of three. Winners and runners-up of each group qualified for the knock-out stage. In this edition of the Games, no bronze medal match was held. Losers of each semifinal were automatically awarded a bronze medal.

== Results ==
All times are local time in UTC+9.

=== Preliminary round ===
The first two matches were played on 25 August, and the third on 26 August.

Qualified for the knock-out stage

==== Group A ====
Seed	Athlete	Matches won	Matches lost	Games won	Games lost	Points	Rank
1	Abdullah Ozturk (TUR)	2	0	6	1	4	1
15	Adyos Astan (INA)	1	1	4	4	3	2
11	Rafał Lis (POL)	0	2	1	6	2	3

Adyos Astan (INA)	8	11	3	7
Abdullah Ozturk (TUR)	11	6	11	11

Rafał Lis (POL)	6	6	7
Abdullah Ozturk (TUR)	11	11	11

Rafał Lis (POL)	5	10	13	8
Adyos Astan (INA)	11	12	11	11

==== Group B ====
Seed	Athlete	Matches won	Matches lost	Games won	Games lost	Points	Rank
2	Kim Young-gun (KOR)	2	0	6	3	4	1
12	Francisco Lopez Sayago (ESP)	1	1	4	4	3	2
14	Peter Mihálik (SVK)	0	2	3	6	2	3

Peter Mihálik (SVK)	8	12	16	10	8
Kim Young-gun (KOR)	11	10	14	12	11

Francisco Lopez Sayago (ESP)	10	8	11	10
Kim Young-gun (KOR)	12	11	8	12

Francisco Lopez Sayago (ESP)	13	10	11	12
Peter Mihálik (SVK)	11	12	8	10

==== Group C ====
Seed	Athlete	Matches won	Matches lost	Games won	Games lost	Points	Rank
3	Maxime Thomas (FRA)	2	0	6	3	4	1
13	Sameh Mohamed Saleh (EGY)	1	1	4	4	3	2
10	Isau Ogunkunle (NGR)	0	2	3	6	2	3

Sameh Mohamed Saleh (EGY)	11	7	2	8
Maxime Thomas (FRA)	7	11	11	11

Isau Ogunkunle (NGR)	11	5	13	6	7
Maxime Thomas (FRA)	8	11	11	11	11

Isau Ogunkunle (NGR)	7	7	11	9
Sameh Mohamed Saleh (EGY)	11	11	7	11

==== Group D ====
Seed	Athlete	Matches won	Matches lost	Games won	Games lost	Points	Rank
4	Nesim Turan (TUR)	2	0	6	2	4	1
18	Cristián González (CHI)	1	1	3	5	3	2
7	Yan Zhang (CHN)	0	2	4	6	2	3

Cristián González (CHI)	7	3	4
Nesim Turan (TUR)	11	11	11

Yan Zhang (CHN)	11	5	11	4	9
Nesim Turan (TUR)	9	11	8	11	11

Yan Zhang (CHN)	6	12	9	11	7
Cristián González (CHI)	11	10	11	7	11

==== Group E ====
Seed	Athlete	Matches won	Matches lost	Games won	Games lost	Points	Rank
8	Krzysztof Żyłka (POL)	1	1	3	1	3	1
5	Kim Jung-gil (KOR)	1	1	4	4	3	2
16	Filip Nacházel (CZE)	1	1	3	4	3	3

Filip Nacházel (CZE)	11	6	11	11
Kim Jung-gil (KOR)	8	11	9	8

Krzysztof Żyłka (POL)	11	8	8	11
Kim Jung-gil (KOR)	8	11	11	13

Krzysztof Żyłka (POL)	13	11	11
Filip Nacházel (CZE)	11	8	8

==== Group F ====
Seed	Athlete	Matches won	Matches lost	Games won	Games lost	Points	Rank
17	Boris Trávniček (SVK)	2	0	6	4	3	1
6	Wanchai Chaiwut (THA)	1	1	5	5	3	2
9	Guo Xingyuan (CHN)	0	2	4	6	2	3

Boris Trávniček (SVK)	18	1	11	6	11
Wanchai Chaiwut (THA)	16	11	2	11	8

Guo Xingyuan (CHN)	11	11	11	8	10
Wanchai Chaiwut (THA)	9	8	13	11	12

Guo Xingyuan (CHN)	8	4	11	11	5
Boris Trávniček (SVK)	11	11	9	9	11

=== Knockout stage ===
Round of 16
B2	Francisco Lopez Sayago (ESP)	14	11	11
D2	Cristián González (CHI)	12	7	9
E1	Krysztof Zylka (POL)	11	12	11
F2	Wanchai Chaiwut (THA)	7	10	7
E2	Kim Jung-gil (KOR)	11	4	7	6
F1	Boris Trávniček (SVK)	6	11	11	11
C2	Sameh Mohamed Saleh (EGY)	6	11	15	10	11
A2	Adyos Astan (INA)	11	8	13	12	9

Quarter-finals
A1	Abdullah Ozturk (TUR)	11	11	11
B2	Francisco Lopez Sayago (ESP)	6	9	2
E1	Krysztof Zylka (POL)	7	11	5	3
C1	Maxime Thomas (FRA)	11	8	11	11
D1	Nesim Turan (TUR)	11	12	11
F1	Boris Trávniček (SVK)	9	10	9
C2	Sameh Mohamed Saleh (EGY)	4	4	8
B1	Kim Young-gun (KOR)	11	11	11

Semi-finals
A1	Abdullah Ozturk (TUR)	13	8	11	11
C1	Maxime Thomas (FRA) (bronze)	11	11	9	8
D1	Nesim Turan (TUR) (bronze)	11	9	7	2
B1	Kim Young-gun (KOR)	9	11	11	11

Gold medal match
A1	Abdullah Ozturk (TUR) (gold)	9	11	11	12
B1	Kim Young-gun (KOR) (silver)	11	6	7	10
