= Table tennis at the 2020 Summer Paralympics – Men's individual – Class 5 =

Table tennis at the XVI Paralympic Games
- Venue: Tokyo Metropolitan Gymnasium
- Dates: 25–29 August 2021
- Competitors: 12 from 11 nations

Medalists
1st place, gold medalist(s)		Valentin Baus	Germany
2nd place, silver medalist(s)		Cao Ningning	China
3rd place, bronze medalist(s)		Ali Öztürk	Turkey
3rd place, bronze medalist(s)		Jack Hunter-Spivey	Great Britain

The Men's individual table tennis – Class 5 tournament at the 2020 Summer Paralympics in Tokyo took place from 25 to 29 August, 2021, at the Tokyo Metropolitan Gymnasium. Classes 1–5 were designated for athletes with physical impairment affecting their legs, who competed in a sitting position. The lower the classification number, the greater the impact of the impairment on the athlete's ability to compete.

In the preliminary stage, athletes competed in four groups of three. Winners and runners-up of each group qualified for the knock-out stage. In this edition of the Games, no bronze medal match was held. Losers of each semifinal were automatically awarded a bronze medal.

== Results ==
All times are local time in UTC+9.

=== Main bracket ===
==== Final rounds ====
Quarterfinals
A1	Cao Ningning (CHN)	11	11	11
B2	Cheng Ming-chih (TPE)	8	9	6
D2	Ali Öztürk (TUR)	13	8	11	11
C1	Mitar Palikuća (SRB)	11	11	7	6
D1	Valentin Baus (GER)	11	11	11
A2	Nicolas Savant-Aira (FRA)	3	3	4
C2	Tommy Urhaug (NOR)	11	11	9	12	10
B1	Jack Hunter-Spivey (GBR)	9	13	11	10	12

Semifinals
A1	Cao Ningning (CHN)	11	11	11
D2	Ali Öztürk (TUR)	7	9	9
D1	Valentin Baus (GER)	11	12	11
B1	Jack Hunter-Spivey (GBR)	7	10	7

Gold medal match
A1	Cao Ningning (CHN)	4	11	11	11	7
D1	Valentin Baus (GER)	11	7	9	13	11

=== Preliminary round ===
Qualified for the knock-out stage

==== Group A ====
Seed	Athlete	Won	Lost	Points diff	Rank
1	Cao Ningning (CHN)	2	0	+24	1
8	Nicolas Savant-Aira (FRA)	1	1	+1	2
9	Hamza Çalışkan (TUR)	0	2	–25	3

Hamza Çalışkan (TUR)	6	9	8
Cao Ningning (CHN)	11	11	11

Cao Ningning (CHN)	11	11	11
Nicolas Savant-Aira (FRA)	3	9	7

Hamza Çalışkan (TUR)	11	1	6	12	7
Nicolas Savant-Aira (FRA)	9	11	11	10	11

==== Group B ====
Seed	Athlete	Won	Lost	Points diff	Rank
7	Jack Hunter-Spivey (GBR)	2	0	+35	1
2	Cheng Ming-chih (TPE)	1	1	–7	2
10	Bart Brands (BEL)	0	2	–28	3

Bart Brands (BEL)	4	3	14	8
Cheng Ming-chih (TPE)	11	11	12	11

Jack Hunter-Spivey (GBR)	11	11	11
Cheng Ming-chih (TPE)	3	4	3

Jack Hunter-Spivey (GBR)	11	9	11	11
Bart Brands (BEL)	6	11	5	8

==== Group C ====
Seed	Athlete	Won	Lost	Points diff	Rank
5	Mitar Palikuća (SRB)	2	0	+11	1
3	Tommy Urhaug (NOR)	1	1	+17	2
12	Mauro Depergola (ARG)	0	2	–28	3

Mauro Depergola (ARG)	4	7	6
Tommy Urhaug (NOR)	11	11	11

Tommy Urhaug (NOR)	10	11	8	11	8
Mitar Palikuća (SRB)	12	7	11	6	11

Mitar Palikuća (SRB)	11	11	11
Mauro Depergola (ARG)	8	6	7

==== Group D ====
Seed	Athlete	Won	Lost	Points diff	Rank
4	Valentin Baus (GER)	2	0	+29	1
6	Ali Öztürk (TUR)	1	1	+10	2
11	Ayman Zenaty (EGY)	0	2	–39	3

Ayman Zenaty (EGY)	7	3	1
Valentin Baus (GER)	11	11	11

Valentin Baus (GER)	7	9	11	11	11
Ali Öztürk (TUR)	11	11	8	6	6

Ali Öztürk (TUR)	11	11	11
Ayman Zenaty (EGY)	4	8	4
