= Powerlifting at the 2016 Summer Paralympics – Women's 79 kg =

Powerlifting – Women's 79 kg at the XV Paralympic Games
- Venue: Riocentro Pavilion 2
- Date: 12 September 2012
- Competitors: 9 from 9 nations
- Winning lift: 138.0 kg WR

Medalists
1st place, gold medalist(s)		Bose Omolayo	Nigeria
2nd place, silver medalist(s)		Xu Lili	China
3rd place, bronze medalist(s)		Lin Tzu-hui	Chinese Taipei

The women's 79 kg powerlifting event at the 2016 Summer Paralympics was contested on 12 September at Riocentro Pavilion 2. The event featured five-time Paralympian and three-time Paralympic medalist Lin Tzu-hui, competing for Chinese Taipei. The best outcome out of three attempts counted as the final results. The athlete who placed first in each event was allowed a fourth attempt to break the Paralympic or world record.

== Records ==
There are twenty powerlifting events, corresponding to ten weight classes each for men and women. The weight categories were significantly adjusted after the 2012 Games so most of the weights are new for 2016. As a result, no Paralympic record was available for this weight class prior to the competition. The existing world records were as follows.

Record Type	Weight	Country	Venue	Date
World record	137 kg	Bose Omolayo (NGR)	Almaty	29 July 2015
Paralympic record	–	–	–	–

== Results ==
Rank	Name	Body weight (kg)	Attempts (kg)				Result (kg)
Rank	Name	Body weight (kg)	1	2	3	4	Result (kg)
1st place, gold medalist(s)	Bose Omolayo (NGR)	77.59	~~137.0~~	138.0; WR PR	~~141.0~~	–	138.0
2nd place, silver medalist(s)	Xu Lili (CHN)	75.96	~~135.0~~	135.0	~~140.0~~	–	135.0
3rd place, bronze medalist(s)	Lin Tzu-hui (TPE)	77.50	~~121.0~~	125.0	131.0	–	131.0
4	Perla Barcenas (MEX)	78.24	122.0	126.0	~~132.0~~	–	126.0
5	Siti Mahmudah (INA)	76.70	~~110.0~~	~~116.0~~	116.0	–	116.0
6	Gehan Hassan (EGY)	78.13	115.0	~~122.0~~	~~122.0~~	–	115.0
7	Lyubov Semenyuk (UKR)	77.77	95.0	100.0	~~105.0~~	–	100.0
8	Sahar Elgnemi (LBA)	78.26	85.0	~~90.0~~	~~97.0~~	–	85.0
