= Mihriban Kaya =

Turkish Paralympic athlete

Personal information
- Nationality: Turkish
- Born: 10 March 1996 (age 29) Gümüşhane, Turkey

Sport
- Country: Turkey
- Sport: Para-athletics
- Disability class: F20
- Event: Shot put

Mihriban Kaya (born 10 March 1996), also known as Mihriban Korkmaz, is a Turkish female Paralympian athlete with an intellectual disability competing in the F20 disability class of shot put event.

Mihriban Kaya was born in northeastern city of Gümüşhane in Turkey on 10 March 1996.

Kaya captured the gold medal in the women's pentathlon event at the 2016 INAS Athletics Indoor Championships held in Ancona, Italy.

She competed in the shot put F20 event at the 2016 IPC Athletics European Championships in Grosseto, Italy, and obtained a quota spot for the 2016 Paralympics in Rio de Janeiro, Brazil after throwing 11.32 meters, a personal best distance of her.
