= Table tennis at the 2016 Summer Paralympics – Men's team – Class 4–5 =

Table tennis at the XV Paralympic Games
- Venue: Riocentro Pavilion 3
- Dates: 14–16 September 2016
- Competitors: 12 teams from 12 nations

Medalists
1st place, gold medalist(s)		Choi Ilsang; Kim Jung-gil; Kim Young Gun	South Korea
2nd place, silver medalist(s)		Cheng Ming-chih; Lin Yen-hung	Chinese Taipei
3rd place, bronze medalist(s)		Abdullah Öztürk; Ali Öztürk; Nesim Turan	Turkey

The men's team table tennis – 4–5 tournament at the 2016 Summer Paralympics in Rio de Janeiro took place from 14–16 September 2016 at Riocentro Pavilion 3. Classes 1–5 were for athletes with a physical impairment that affected their legs, and who competed in a sitting position. The lower the number, the greater the impact the impairment was on an athlete's ability to compete.

== Results ==
All times are local time in UTC-3.

=== Finals ===
==== Main bracket ====
Round of 16
9	Serbia (SRB)	1	0
8	Germany (GER)	3	3
5	Egypt (EGY)	3	1	3
12	Spain (ESP)	1	3	0
11	Chinese Taipei (TPE)	3	3
6	Argentina (ARG)	0	0
7	Nigeria (NGR)	3	2	3
10	Poland (POL)	0	3	1

Quarter-finals
1	South Korea (KOR)	3	3
8	Germany (GER)	1	1
5	Egypt (EGY)	2	0
4	China (CHN)	3	3
3	France (FRA)	1	2
11	Chinese Taipei (TPE)	3	3
7	Nigeria (NGR)	0	1
2	Turkey (TUR)	3	3

Semi-finals
1	South Korea (KOR)	1	3	3
4	China (CHN)	3	1	0
11	Chinese Taipei (TPE)	3	3
2	Turkey (TUR)	1	2

Finals
1	South Korea (KOR)	3	1	3
11	Chinese Taipei (TPE)	1	3	0

==== Bronze medal match ====
Bronze medal match
4	China (CHN)	1	3	2
2	Turkey (TUR)	3	2	3
