= Erdoğan Aygan =

Turkish Paralympic archer (born 1979)

Personal information
- Nationality: Turkish
- Born: 11 January 1979 (age 47) Turkey

Sport
- Country: Turkey
- Sport: Paralympic archery
- Event: Compound bow
- Club: Istanbul Archery Club
- Coached by: Metin Gazoz

Achievements and titles
- Paralympic finals: 2016
Medal record
Men's archery (compound bow)
Representing Turkey
World Para Archery Championships
Silver medal – second place	2015 Donaueschingen	Open Team
Gold medal – first place	2013 Bangkok	Open Mixed Team
- Updated on 3 September 2016

Erdoğan Aygan (born 11 January 1979) is a Turkish Paralympian archer competing in the Men's compound bow event.

== Early life ==
Erdoğan Aygan was born on 11 January 1979. He lives in Istanbul, Turkey.

== Sporting career ==
Aygan began his archery career in 2009, and debuted internationally in 2010. He has been coached by Metin Gazoz at Istanbul Archery Club since 2009.

He won a gold medal with the national mixed team at the 2013 World Para-archery Championships in Bangkok, Thailand, and a silver medal with the men's team at the 2015 World Para Archery Championships in Donaueschingen, Germany.

He obtained a quota spot for the 2016 Summer Paralympics in Rio de Janeiro, Brazil.

Aygan is right-handed and shoots 69 cm (27 in)-long arrows, with a bow draw weight of 27 kg (60 lb).
