= Dilfiroz Kuzdağı =

Turkish powerlifter

Personal information
- Nationality: Turkish
- Born: 1 January 1982 (age 44)
- Weight: 67 kg (148 lb)

Sport
- Country: Turkey
- Sport: Powerlifting
- Event: -67 kg

Achievements and titles
- Highest world ranking: 7th (25 February 2016)
Medal record
Women's powerlifting
Representing Turkey
IPC European Open Championships
Silver medal – second place	2015 Eger	-67 kg
Silver medal – second place	2013 Aleksin	-67 kg

Dilfiroz Kuzdağı (born 1 January 1982) is a Turkish powerlifter competing in the -67 kg division. She represented her country at the 2016 Paralympics.

== Early life ==
Kuzdağı was born on 1 January 1982. She succumbed to polio as she was seven months old. She became disabled with impaired muscle power.

The mother of two divorced in 2013 as her spouse did not want she performed sport staying away from home for training camps.

Currently, she is a student of coaching education at the School of Physical Education and Sports of Gaziantep University.

== Sporting career ==
Kuzdağı began her sporting career with arm wrestling in 2008, and switched over to powerlifting in 2012.

She was admitted to the national team after winning the Turkish championship. She internationally debuted in 2013 at the IPC Powerlifting European Open Championships in Aleksin, Russia, and became silver medalist by lifting 85 kg. She lifted 95 kg, and won the silver medal at the 2015 IPC Powerlifting European Open Championships in Eger, Hungary.

She earned a quota spot for the 2016 Summer Paralympics in Rio de Janeiro, Brazil.

As of 25 February 2016, Kuzdağı ranks at seventh place of her weight division in the IPC Powerlifting World Ranking List. She ranks second at European level.
