= Ali Öztürk (table tennis) =

Turkish para table tennis player

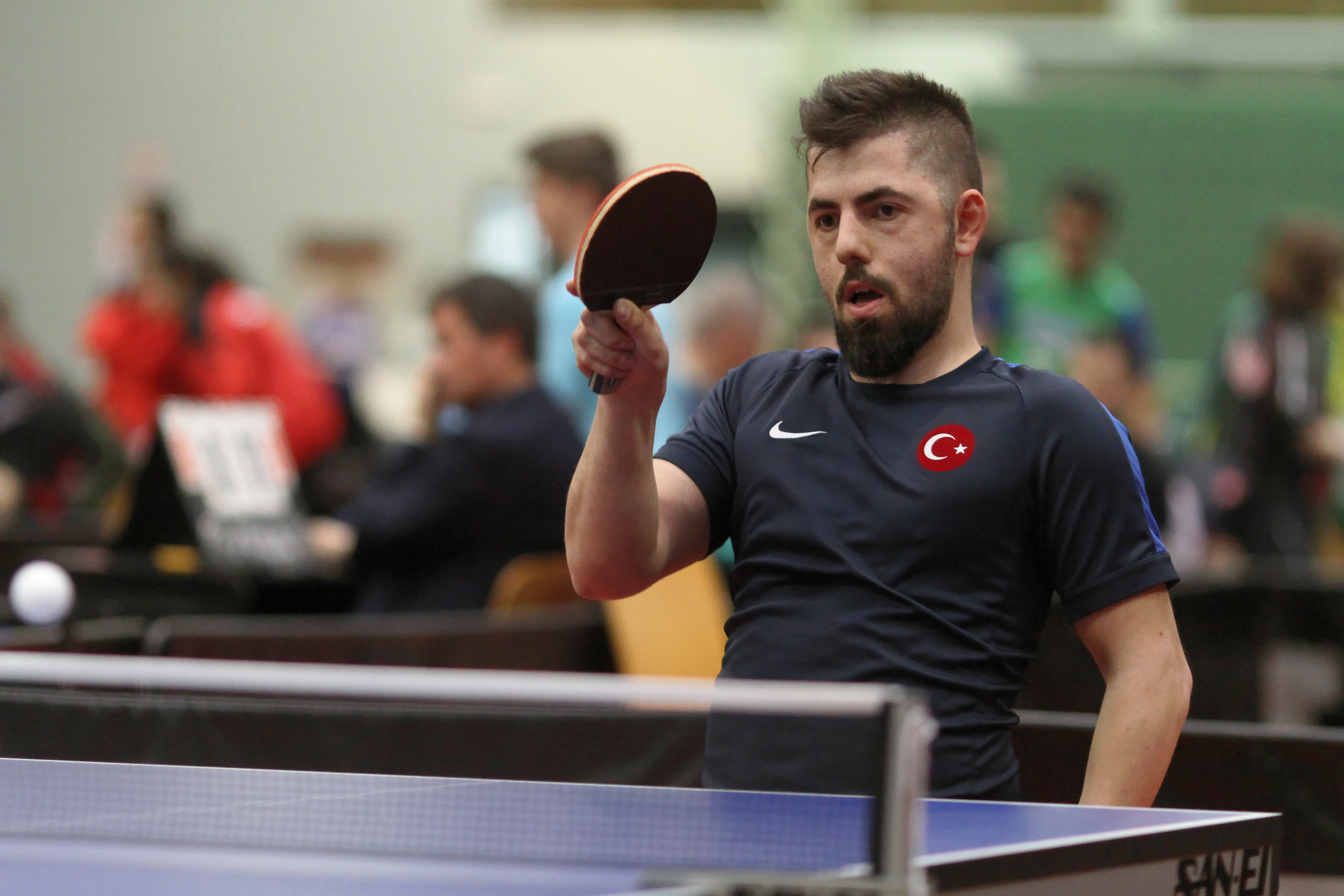
- Öztürk at Open Slovenia in 2012

Personal information
- Born: 1 April 1993 (age 33) Trabzon, Turkey
- Height: 175 cm (5 ft 9 in)

Sport
- Country: Turkey
- Sport: Para table tennis
- Disability class: class 4
- Club: Lider Engellier SC
- Coached by: İlhami Kılınçkaya
Medal record
Men's para table tennis (class 4-5)
Representing Turkey
Paralympic Games
Bronze medal – third place	2024 Paris	Individual C5
Bronze medal – third place	2020 Tokyo	Individual C5
Bronze medal – third place	2016 Rio de Janeiro	Team C4–5
World Championships
Gold medal – first place	2018 Lasko	Singles C5
Silver medal – second place	2014 Beijing	Team C5
World Team Championships
Silver medal – second place	2017 Bratislava	Team C5
European Championships
Gold medal – first place	2017 Lasko	Singles C5
Bronze medal – third place	2017 Lasko	Team C5
Bronze medal – third place	2015 Vejle	Team C5
Silver medal – second place	2013 Lignano	Singles C5
Bronze medal – third place	2013 Lignano	Team C5
Islamic Solidarity Games
Gold medal – first place	2021 Konya	Singles C5
Gold medal – first place	2021 Konya	Team C5
- Updated on 8 April 2019

Ali Öztürk (born 1 April 1993) is a Turkish para table tennis player of class 4 and Paralympian.

In 2014, he won the silver medal along with his brother Abdullah Öztürk and Nesim Turan in the Team C5 event at the World Para Table Tennis Championships in Beijing, China.

He took the gold medal with his teammates Abdullah Öztürk and Nesim Turan in the Team C4 event at the 2016 Lignano Master Open in Italy.

He won the bronze medal in the Team C4–5 event at the 2016 Paralympics in Rio de Janeiro, Brazil along with Abdullah Öztürk and teammate Nesim Turan.
