= Abdullah Öztürk =

Turkish Paralympic table tennis player

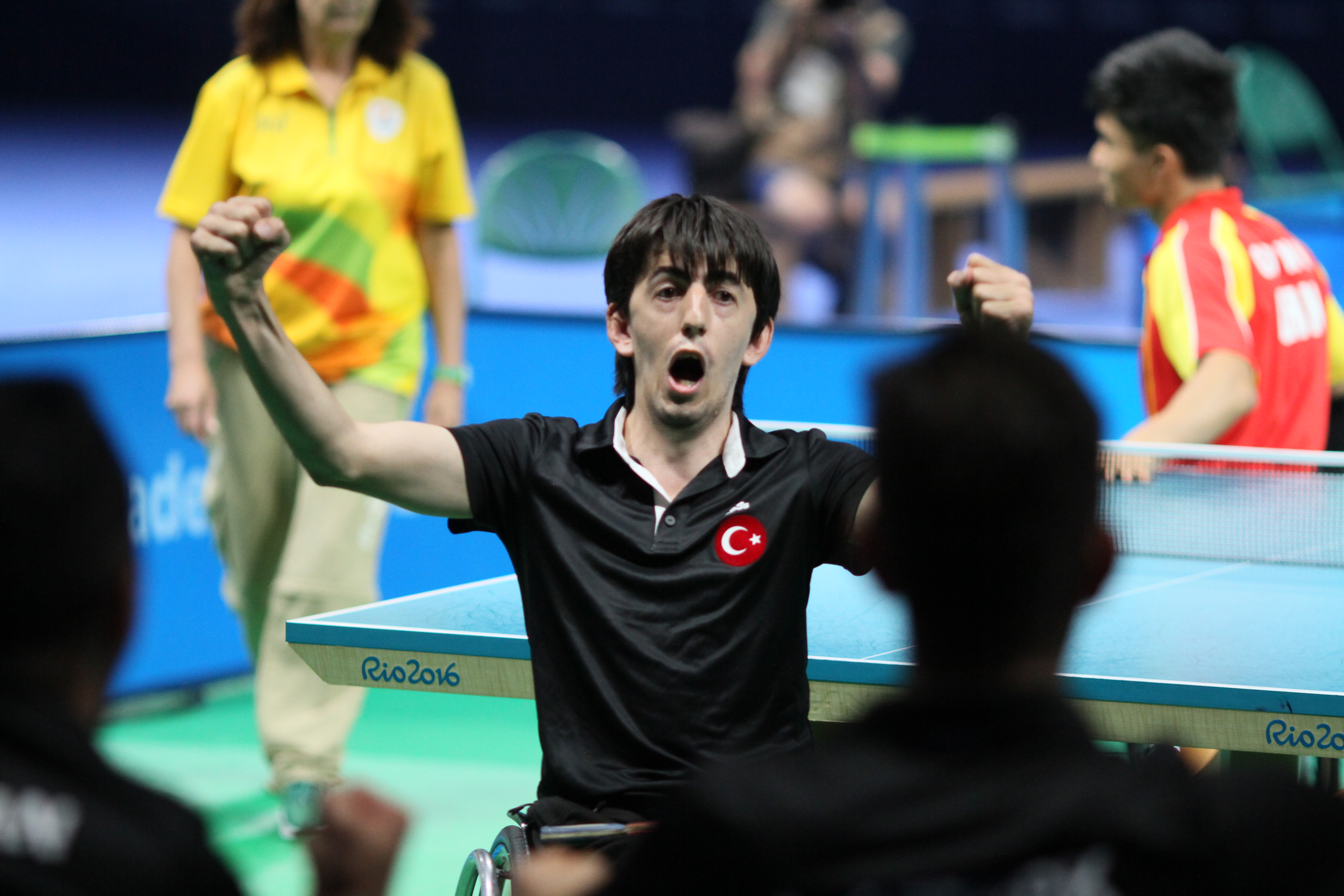
- Ozturk at 2016 Summer Paralympics

Personal information
- Nationality: Turkish
- Born: 1 October 1989 (age 36) Trabzon, Turkey
- Height: 165 cm (5 ft 5 in)

Sport
- Country: Turkey
- Sport: Para table tennis
- Club: Lider Engellier SC
- Turned pro: 2008
- Coached by: Ilhami Kilinckaya

Achievements and titles
- Highest world ranking: 1st (August 2017)
Medal record
Men's para table tennis (class 4)
Representing Turkey
Paralympic Games
Gold medal – first place	2020 Tokyo	Individual C4
Gold medal – first place	2016 Rio de Janeiro	Individual C4
Bronze medal – third place	2016 Rio de Janeiro	Team C4–5
Bronze medal – third place	2024 Paris	Doubles MD8
World Championships
Silver medal – second place	2018 Lasko	Individual C4
Silver medal – second place	2014 Beijing	Team C5
Bronze medal – third place	2010 Gwangju	Team C4
World Team Championships
Gold medal – first place	2017 Bratislava	Team C4
European Championships
Gold medal – first place	2013 Lignano	Individual C4
Gold medal – first place	2015 Vejle	Team C4
Gold medal – first place	2017 Lasko	Team C4
Silver medal – second place	2011 Split	Team C4
Silver medal – second place	2013 Lignano	Team C4
Silver medal – second place	2015 Vejle	Individual C4
Silver medal – second place	2017 Lasko	Individual C4
Bronze medal – third place	2011 Split	Individual C4
Islamic Solidarity Games
Gold medal – first place	2021 Konya	Team C4
Silver medal – second place	2021 Konya	Individual C4
- Updated on 8 April 2019

Abdullah Öztürk (born 1 October 1989) is a Turkish para table tennis player of class 4 and Paralympian.

Öztürk represented his country at the 2012 Summer Paralympics in London, United Kingdom.

In 2014, he won the silver medal along with Ali Öztürk and Nesim Turan in the Team C5 event at the World Para Table Tennis Championships in Beijing, China.

He took the gold medal with his teammates Ali Öztürk and Nesim Turan in the Team C4 event at the 2016 Lignano Master Open in Italy. He captured the gold medal in the individual C4 event at the 2016 Summer Paralympics in Rio de Janeiro, Brazil. He won the bronze medal in the Team C4–5 event of the Paralympics along with his brother Ali Öztürk and teammate Nesim Turan.

As of April 2019, Öztürk ranks second in the world list of his disability class.

He won the gold medal in the Individual C4 event at the 2020 Summer Paralympics.
