= Cao Ningning =

Chinese para table tennis player

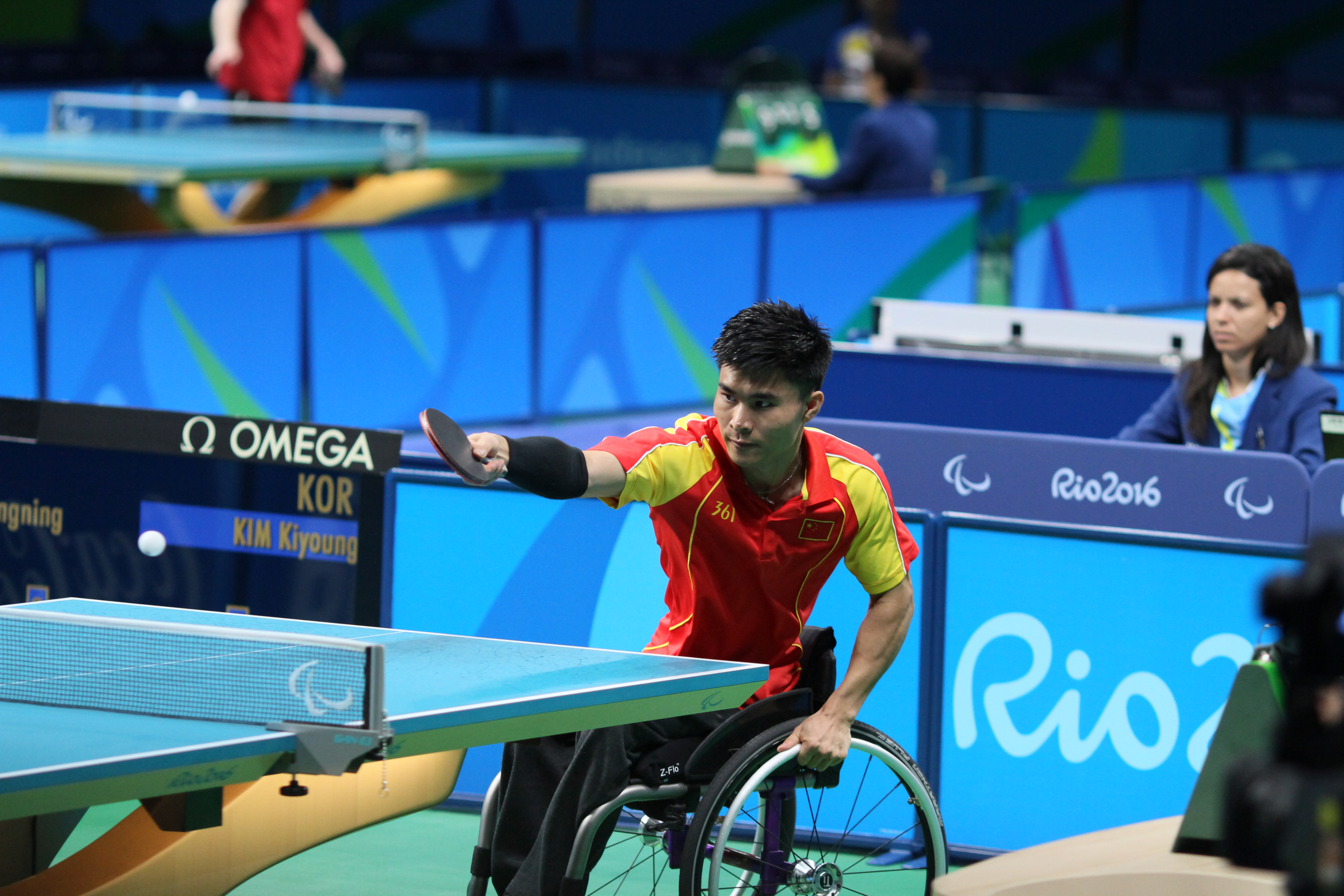
- Cao at the 2016 Summer Paralympics

Personal information
- Born: November 20, 1987 (age 38) Pizhou, Jiangsu, China
- Height: 170 cm (5 ft 7 in)
- Weight: 55 kg (121 lb)

Sport
- Sport: Table tennis
- Playing style: Right-handed shakehand grip
- Disability class: 5 (formerly 4)
- Highest ranking: 1 (January 2012)
- Current ranking: 2 (February 2020)
Medal record
Men's para table tennis
Representing China
Paralympic Games
| Gold medal – first place | 2012 London | Teams C4–5 |
| Gold medal – first place | 2016 Rio de Janeiro | Singles C5 |
| Gold medal – first place | 2020 Tokyo | Teams C4–5 |
| Gold medal – first place | 2024 Paris | Doubles MD8 |
| Silver medal – second place | 2012 London | Singles C5 |
| Silver medal – second place | 2020 Tokyo | Singles C5 |
World Championships
| Gold medal – first place | 2014 Beijing | Teams C5 |
| Silver medal – second place | 2018 Lasko | Singles C5 |
Asian Para Games
| Gold medal – first place | 2010 Guangzhou | Singles C4 |
| Gold medal – first place | 2014 Incheon | Teams C5 |
| Gold medal – first place | 2018 Jakarta | Singles C5 |
| Silver medal – second place | 2010 Guangzhou | Teams C4–5 |
| Silver medal – second place | 2018 Jakarta | Teams C4–5 |
| Bronze medal – third place | 2022 Hangzhou | Singles C5 |
FESPIC Games
| Silver medal – second place | 2006 Kuala Lumpur | Singles C4 |
| Silver medal – second place | 2006 Kuala Lumpur | Teams C5 |
Asian Championships
| Gold medal – first place | 2007 Seoul | Open singles in wheelchair |
| Gold medal – first place | 2007 Seoul | Teams C5 |
| Gold medal – first place | 2011 Hong Kong | Singles C5 |
| Gold medal – first place | 2013 Beijing | Singles C5 |
| Gold medal – first place | 2013 Beijing | Teams C5 |
| Gold medal – first place | 2015 Amman | Singles C5 |
| Gold medal – first place | 2015 Amman | Teams C5 |
| Gold medal – first place | 2017 Beijing | Teams C5 |
| Gold medal – first place | 2019 Taichung | Singles C5 |
| Silver medal – second place | 2007 Seoul | Singles C4-5 |
| Silver medal – second place | 2011 Hong Kong | Teams C5 |
| Silver medal – second place | 2017 Beijing | Singles C5 |
| Silver medal – second place | 2019 Taichung | Teams C5 |
| Bronze medal – third place | 2005 Kuala Lumpur | Open singles standing |
| Bronze medal – third place | 2005 Kuala Lumpur | Teams C5 |
FESPIC Championships
| Bronze medal – third place | 2003 Shanghai | Teams C5 |

Cao Ningning
- Traditional Chinese: 曹寧寧
- Simplified Chinese: 曹宁宁
Transcriptions
Standard Mandarin
- Hanyu Pinyin: Cáo Níngníng

Cao Ningning (Chinese: 曹宁宁, born November 20, 1987) is a Chinese para table tennis player. He won a gold and a silver at the 2012 Summer Paralympics and a gold medal at the 2016 Summer Paralympics.

Like many of his teammates, Cao was a polio survivor from Pizhou who attended New Hope Center as a child. That's where coach Heng Xin developed him into a star.

== Personal life ==
Cao Ningning is married to South Korean para table tennis player Moon Sung Hye. They met for the first time in 2007, and fell in love in 2011. The couple wed in 2013 and have 3 daughters together.
