= Nesim Turan =

Turkish para table tennis player

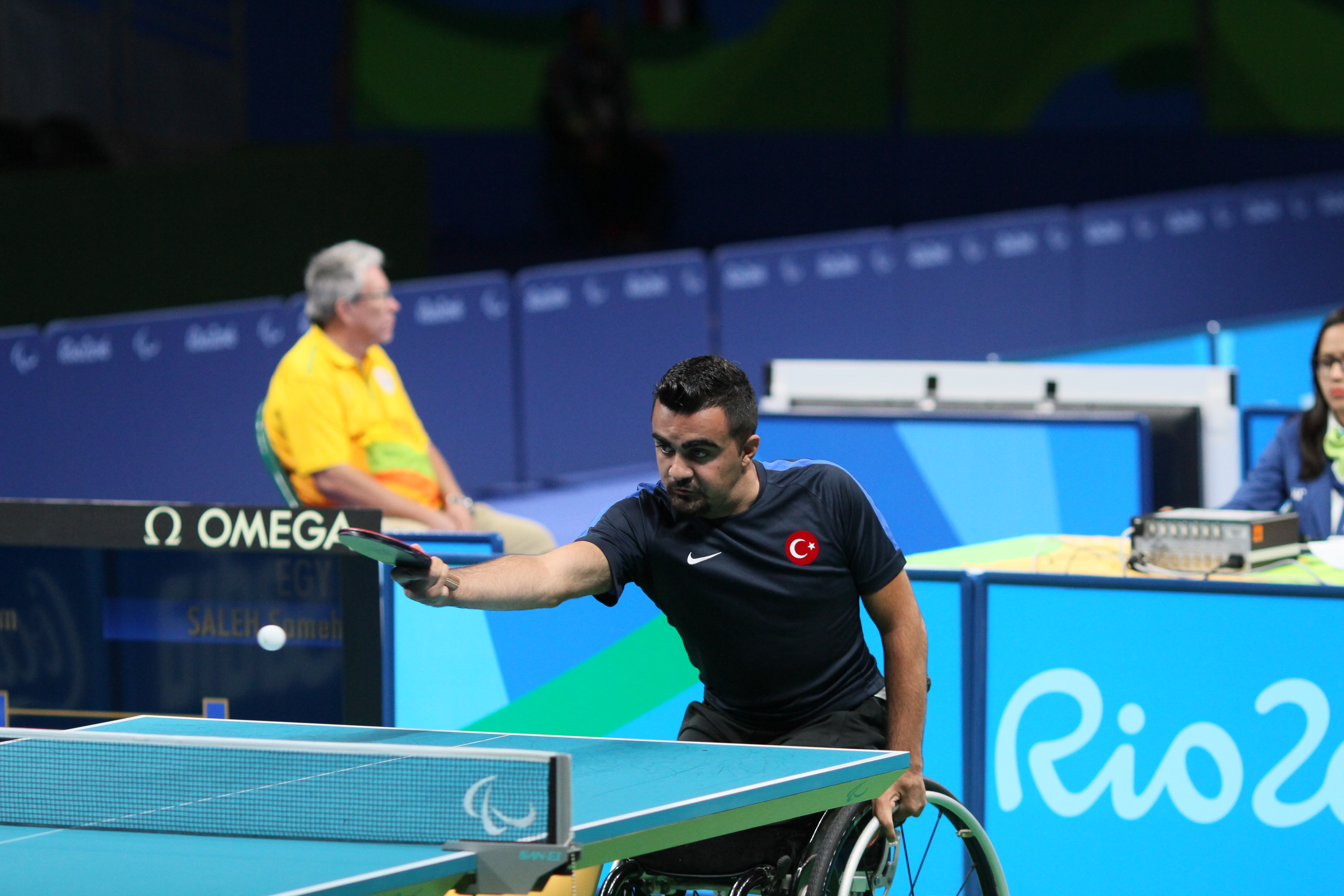

Personal information
- Nationality: Turkish
- Born: 2 March 1992 (age 34) Ağrı, Turkey
- Home town: Ankara, Turkey
- Height: 170 cm (5 ft 7 in)

Sport
- Country: Turkey
- Sport: Para table tennis
- Club: Lider Engellier SC
- Coached by: Ilhami Kilinckaya
Medal record
Men's para table tennis (class 4)
Representing Turkey
Paralympic Games
Bronze medal – third place	2016 Rio de Janeiro	Team C4–5
Bronze medal – third place	2020 Tokyo	Individual C4
Bronze medal – third place	2024 Paris	Doubles MD8
World Championships
Gold medal – first place	2018 Lasko	Individual C4
Gold medal – first place	2014 Beijing	Individual C4
Silver medal – second place	2014 Beijing	Team C5
World Team Championships
Gold medal – first place	2017 Bratislava	Team C4
European Championships
Bronze medal – third place	2017 Lasko	Individual C4
Gold medal – first place	2017 Lasko	Team C4
Bronze medal – third place	2015 Vejle	Individual C4
Gold medal – first place	2015 Vejle	Team C4
Silver medal – second place	2013 Lignano	Team C4
Silver medal – second place	2011 Split	Team C4
Islamic Solidarity Games
Gold medal – first place	2021 Konya	Individual C4
Gold medal – first place	2021 Konya	Team C4
- Updated on 8 April 2019

Nesim Turan (born 2 March 1992) is a Turkish para table tennis player of class 4 and Paralympian.

In 2014, he won the gold medal in the Individual C4 event and silver medal along with his teammates Abdullah Öztürk and Ali Öztürk in the Team C5 event at the World Para Table Tennis Championships in Beijing, China.

He took the gold medal with his teammates Ali Öztürk and Abdullah Öztürk in the Team C4 event at the 2016 Lignano Master Open in Italy.

He won the bronze medal in the Team C4–5 event at the 2016 Paralympics in Rio de Janeiro, Brazil along with Abdullah Öztürk and Ali Öztürk.
