= Cheng Ming-chih =

Taiwanese para table tennis player

Cheng Ming-Chih
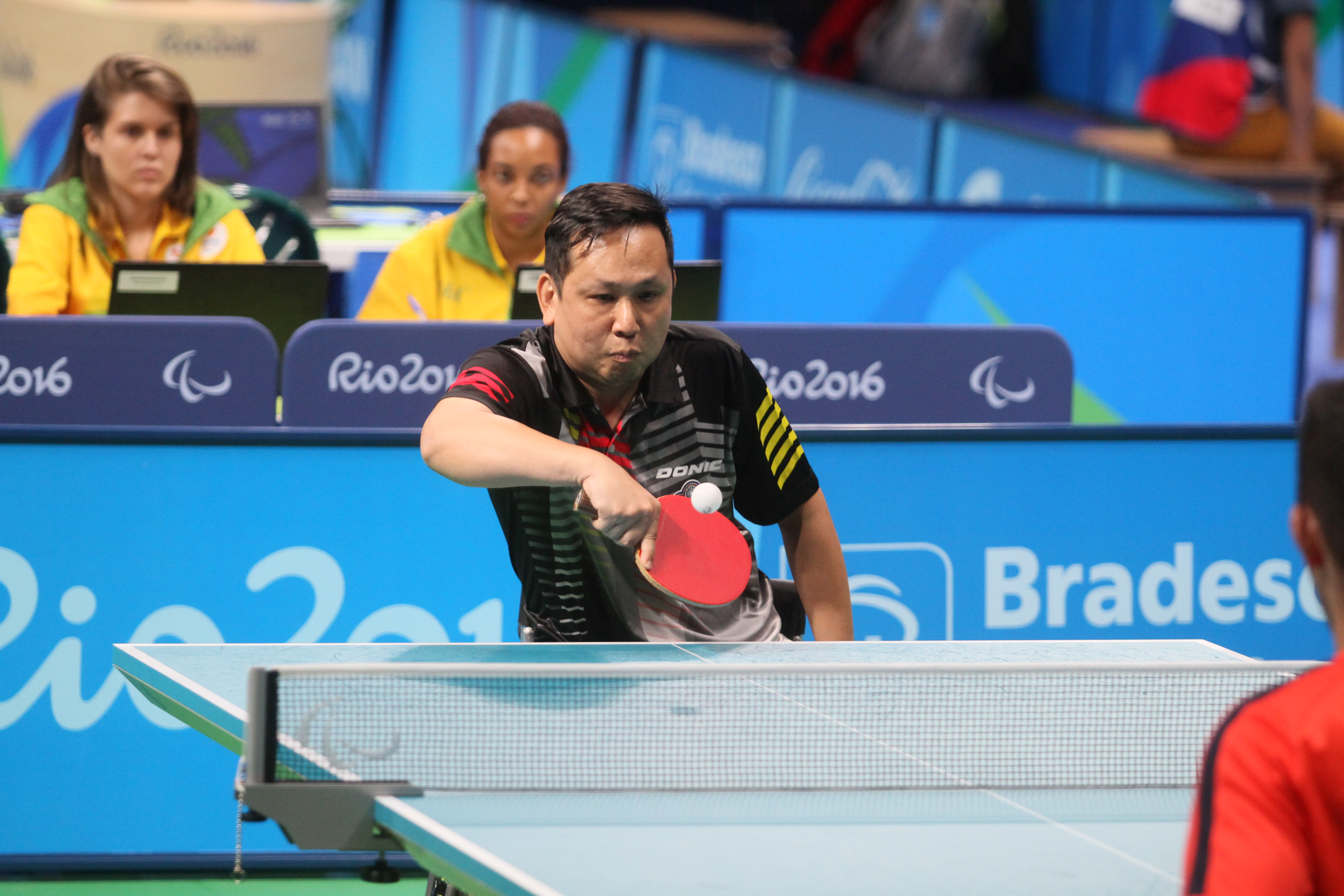
- Cheng at the 2016 Summer Paralympics

Personal information
- Born: 8 August 1979 (age 46) Tainan, Taiwan
- Height: 190 cm (6 ft 3 in)
- Weight: 68 kg (150 lb)

Sport
- Sport: Table tennis
- Playing style: Right-handed shakehand grip
- Disability class: 5
- Highest ranking: 1 (April 2020)
- Current ranking: 1 (April 2020)
Medal record
Men's para table tennis
Representing Chinese Taipei
Paralympic Games
Silver medal – second place	2024 Paris	Singles C5
Silver medal – second place	2016 Rio de Janeiro	Teams C4–5
World Championships
Gold medal – first place	2017 Bratislava	Teams C5
Bronze medal – third place	2018 Laško	Singles C5
Asian Para Games
Silver medal – second place	2018 Jakarta	Singles C5
Bronze medal – third place	2014 Incheon	Singles C5
Bronze medal – third place	2014 Incheon	Teams C5
Bronze medal – third place	2018 Jakarta	Teams C4–5
Bronze medal – third place	2022 Hangzhou	Singles C5
Asian Championships
Silver medal – second place	2015 Amman	Singles C5
Silver medal – second place	2019 Taichung	Singles C5
Bronze medal – third place	2015 Amman	Teams C5
Bronze medal – third place	2019 Taichung	Teams C5

Cheng Ming-chih
- Traditional Chinese: 程銘志
- Simplified Chinese: 程铭志
Transcriptions
Standard Mandarin
- Hanyu Pinyin: Chéng Míngzhì
- Wade–Giles: Ch'êng^{2} Ming^{2}-chih^{4}

Cheng Ming-chih (Chinese: 程銘志, born 8 August 1979) is a Taiwanese para table tennis player. He won a silver medal at the 2016 Paralympics and again at the 2024 Paralympics.

== Personal life ==
He lost his left leg when he was 32, following an accident involving a drunk driver.
