= Kim Young-gun =

South Korean para table tennis player

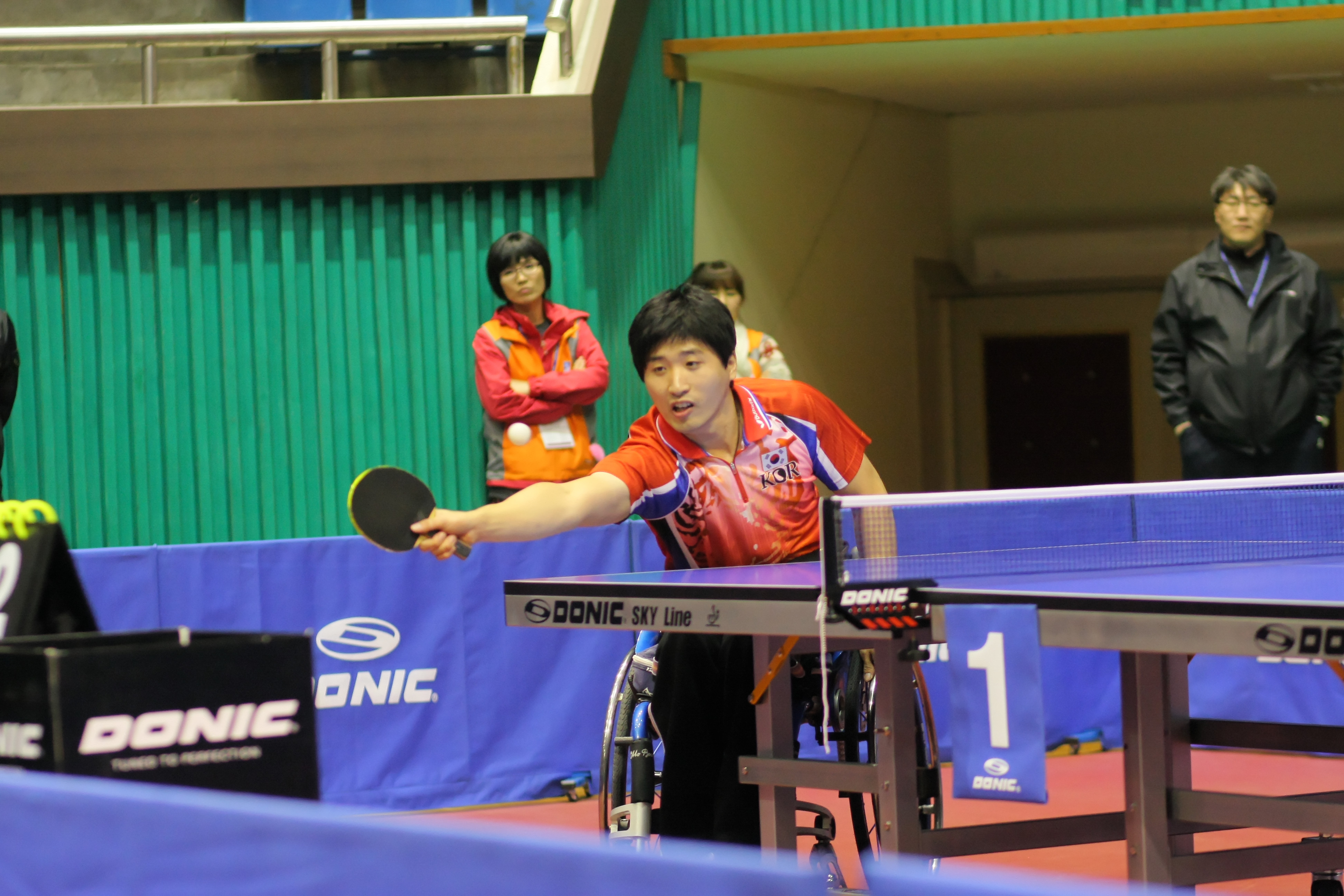
- Kim at the 2010 World Para Table Tennis Championships

Personal information
- Born: 24 November 1984 (age 41) Jangheung County, South Jeolla, South Korea
- Height: 170 cm (5 ft 7 in)
- Weight: 64 kg (141 lb)

Sport
- Sport: Table tennis
- Playing style: Right-handed shakehand grip
- Disability class: 4 (formerly 3)
- Highest ranking: 1 (January 2012)
- Current ranking: 2 (February 2020)
Medal record
Men's para table tennis
Representing South Korea
Paralympic Games
Gold medal – first place	2004 Athens	Singles C3
Gold medal – first place	2004 Athens	Teams C3
Gold medal – first place	2012 London	Singles C4
Gold medal – first place	2016 Rio de Janeiro	Teams C4–5
Gold medal – first place	2024 Paris	Singles C4
Silver medal – second place	2012 London	Teams C4–5
Silver medal – second place	2020 Tokyo	Teams C4–5
World Championships
Gold medal – first place	2010 Gwangju	Open singles in wheelchair
Gold medal – first place	2014 Beijing	Teams C4
Silver medal – second place	2006 Montreux	Singles C3
Silver medal – second place	2006 Montreux	Teams C3
Bronze medal – third place	2002 Taipei	Teams C3
Bronze medal – third place	2014 Beijing	Singles C4
Asian Para Games
Gold medal – first place	2014 Incheon	Singles C4
Gold medal – first place	2014 Incheon	Teams C4
Gold medal – first place	2018 Jakarta	Singles C4
Gold medal – first place	2018 Jakarta	Teams C4–5
Silver medal – second place	2010 Guangzhou	Singles C1–3
Silver medal – second place	2010 Guangzhou	Teams C1–3
Silver medal – second place	2022 Hangzhou	Singles C4
FESPIC Games
Gold medal – first place	2002 Busan	Singles C3
Gold medal – first place	2002 Busan	Teams C3
Gold medal – first place	2006 Kuala Lumpur	Teams C3
Silver medal – second place	2006 Kuala Lumpur	Singles C3
Bronze medal – third place	2006 Kuala Lumpur	Open singles in wheelchair
Asian Championships
Gold medal – first place	2005 Kuala Lumpur	Teams C3
Gold medal – first place	2005 Kuala Lumpur	Open singles standing
Gold medal – first place	2009 Amman	Teams C1–3
Gold medal – first place	2011 Hong Kong	Singles C4
Gold medal – first place	2011 Hong Kong	Teams C4
Gold medal – first place	2013 Beijing	Singles C4
Gold medal – first place	2013 Beijing	Teams C4
Gold medal – first place	2015 Amman	Teams C4
Gold medal – first place	2017 Beijing	Singles C4
Gold medal – first place	2017 Beijing	Teams C4
Gold medal – first place	2019 Taichung	Singles C4
Gold medal – first place	2019 Taichung	Teams C4
Silver medal – second place	2007 Seoul	Teams C1–3
Bronze medal – third place	2009 Amman	Open singles in wheelchair
Bronze medal – third place	2009 Amman	Singles C3
FESPIC Championships
Gold medal – first place	2001 Osaka	Singles C3
Gold medal – first place	2001 Osaka	Teams C3
Gold medal – first place	2003 Shanghai	Singles C3
Silver medal – second place	2003 Shanghai	Open singles in wheelchair

Kim Young-gun (Korean: 김영건; RR: Gim Yeonggeon, born 24 November 1984) is a South Korean para table tennis player. He has participated in four Summer Paralympic Games and has won twelve titles in Asian Para Table Tennis Championships. He is coached by Kim Byoung-young. He would win a gold medal at the 2024 Summer Paralympics in men's singles table tennis.

== Personal life ==
His impairment came as a result of developing acute transverse myelitis in 1997.
