= Maxime Thomas =

French para table tennis player

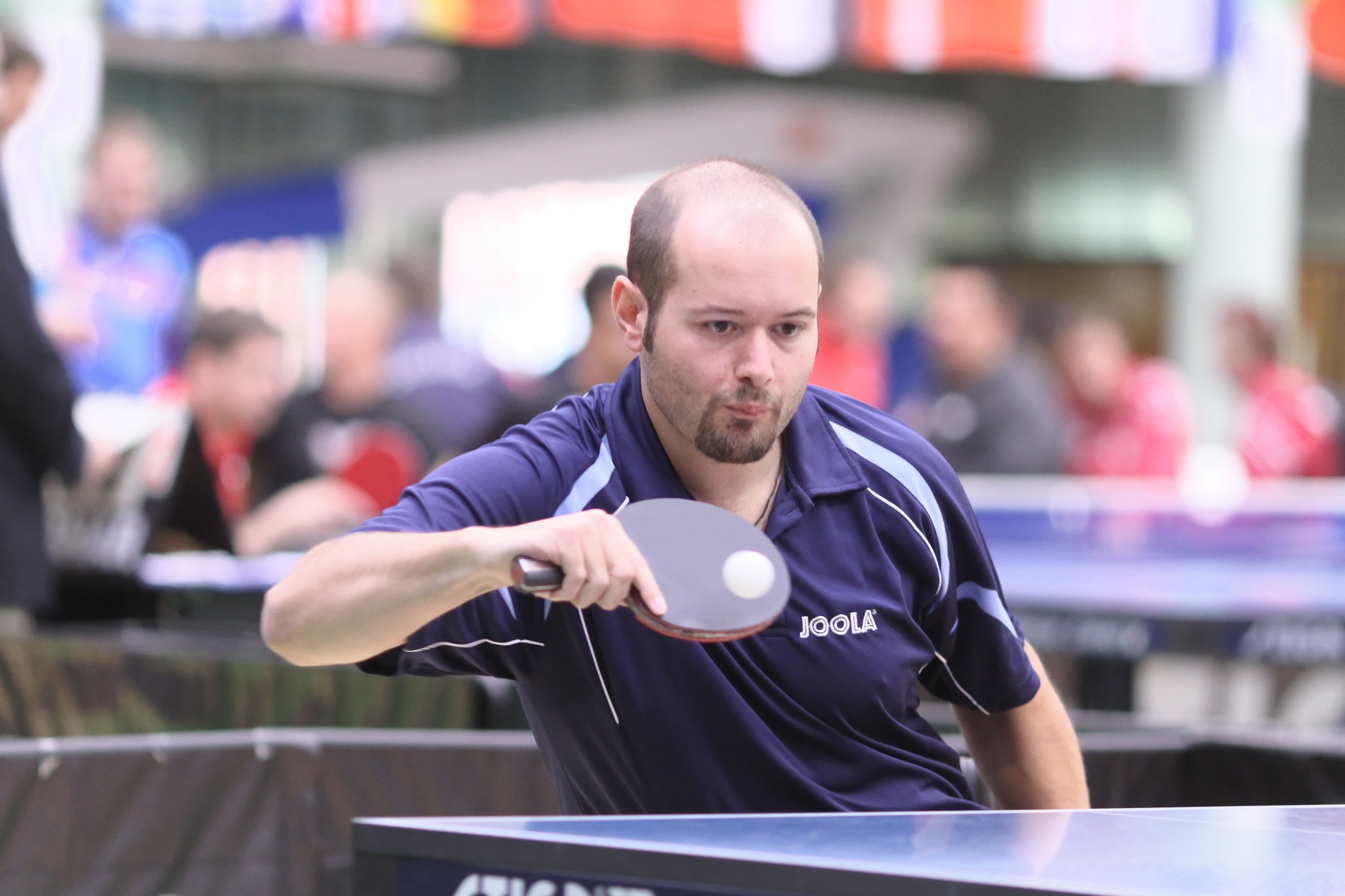
- Thomas in 2014

Personal information
- Nickname: Maxou
- Born: 17 December 1983 (age 42) Nancy, France
- Home town: Lyon, France

Sport
- Country: France
- Sport: Para table tennis
- Disability: Spinal cord injury
- Disability class: C4
Medal record
Para table tennis
Representing France
Paralympic Games
| Bronze medal – third place | 2008 Beijing | Men's team C4-5 |
| Bronze medal – third place | 2012 London | Men's team C4-5 |
| Bronze medal – third place | 2016 Rio de Janeiro | Men's singles C4 |
World Championships
| Gold medal – first place | 2010 Gwangju | Men's teams C4 |
| Bronze medal – third place | 2010 Gwangju | Men's open singles |
| Bronze medal – third place | 2010 Gwangju | Men's singles C4 |
| Bronze medal – third place | 2014 Beijing | Men's singles C4 |
| Bronze medal – third place | 2014 Beijing | Men's teams C5 |
World Team Championships
| Silver medal – second place | 2017 Bratislava | Men's teams C4 |
European Championships
| Gold medal – first place | 2003 Zagreb | Men's teams C4 |
| Gold medal – first place | 2007 Kranjska Gora | Men's teams C4 |
| Gold medal – first place | 2009 Genoa | Men's teams C4 |
| Gold medal – first place | 2011 Split | Men's singles C4 |
| Gold medal – first place | 2011 Split | Men's teams C4 |
| Gold medal – first place | 2013 Lignano | Men's teams C4 |
| Gold medal – first place | 2015 Vejle | Men's singles C4 |
| Gold medal – first place | 2017 Lasko | Men's singles C4 |
| Silver medal – second place | 2007 Kranjska Gora | Men's open singles |
| Silver medal – second place | 2013 Lignano | Men's singles C4 |
| Silver medal – second place | 2015 Vejle | Men's teams C5 |
| Silver medal – second place | 2017 Lasko | Men's teams C4 |
| Silver medal – second place | 2019 Helsingborg | Men's teams C5 |
| Bronze medal – third place | 2009 Genoa | Men's singles C4 |
| Bronze medal – third place | 2009 Genoa | Men's open singles |

Maxime Thomas (born 17 December 1983) is a French para table tennis player who competes in international level events. He is a triple Paralympic bronze medalist, a World champion and six time European champion in team events. He is also a four-time World bronze medalist and double European champion in singles events.

Thomas was paralysed from the waist down aged 15 following a diagnosis of an autoimmune disease and he spent almost two years in a rehabilitation centre. He discovered para table tennis in 2000 when he got inspired by watching the 2000 Summer Paralympics once he left hospital, he played the sport that year and played competitively in 2001.
