= Choi Il-sang =

South Korean para table tennis player (born 1975)

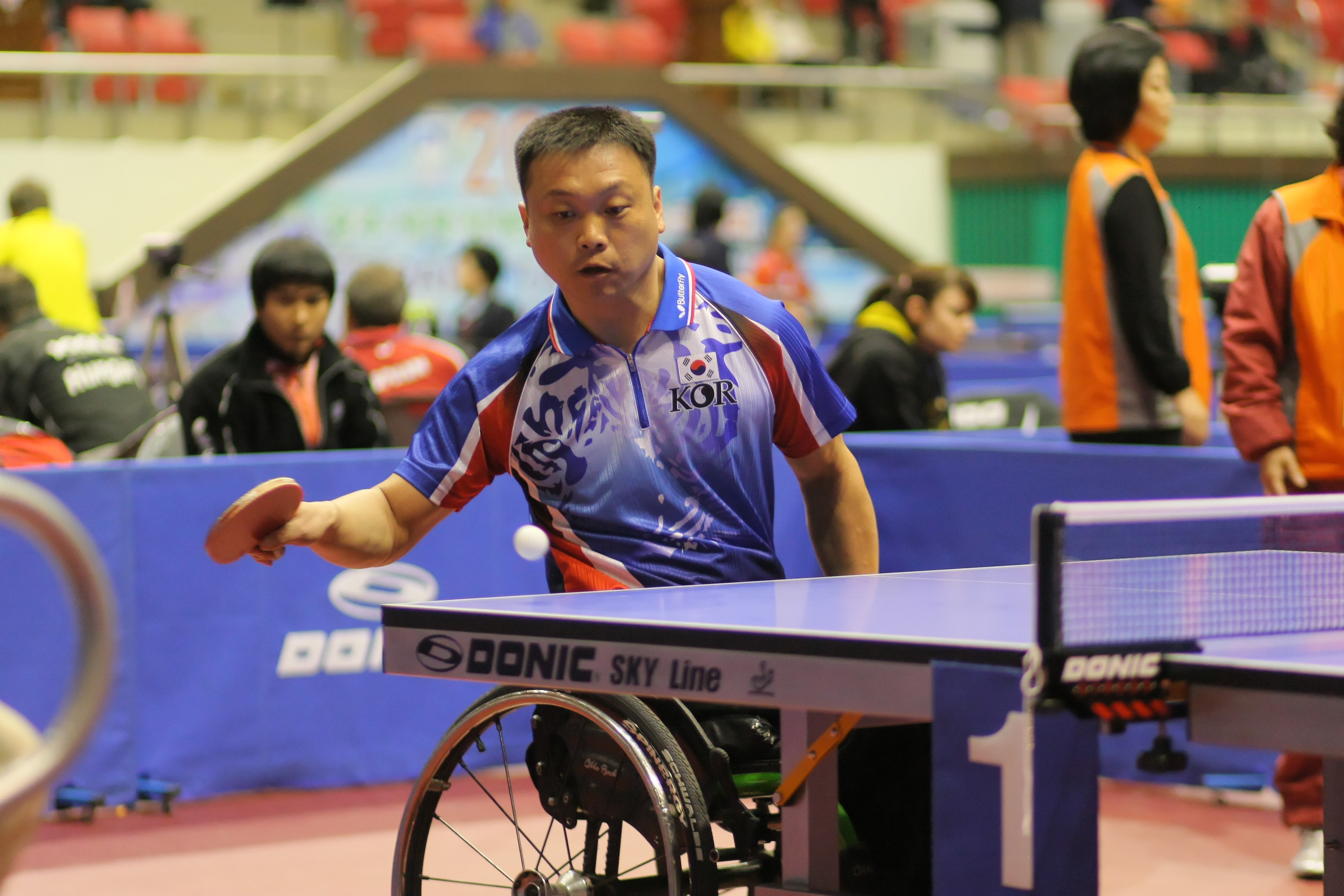
- Choi at the 2010 World Para Table Tennis Championships

Personal information
- Born: July 15, 1975 (age 51) Gumi, North Gyeongsang, South Korea
- Height: 181 cm (5 ft 11 in)
- Weight: 70 kg (154 lb)

Sport
- Sport: Table tennis
- Playing style: Right-handed shakehand grip
- Disability class: 4
- Highest ranking: 2 (December 2013)
Medal record
Men's para table tennis
Representing South Korea
Paralympic Games
Gold medal – first place	2016 Rio de Janeiro	Teams C4–5
Silver medal – second place	2012 London	Teams C4–5
World Championships
Gold medal – first place	2014 Beijing	Teams C4
Silver medal – second place	2006 Montreux	Teams C4
Silver medal – second place	2010 Gwangju	Teams C4
Silver medal – second place	2014 Beijing	Singles C4
Asian Para Games
Gold medal – first place	2010 Guangzhou	Teams C4–5
Gold medal – first place	2014 Incheon	Teams C4
Silver medal – second place	2014 Incheon	Singles C4
FESPIC Games
Gold medal – first place	2006 Kuala Lumpur	Teams C4
Silver medal – second place	2002 Busan	Teams C4
Asian Championships
Gold medal – first place	2005 Kuala Lumpur	Teams C4
Gold medal – first place	2011 Hong Kong	Teams C4
Gold medal – first place	2013 Beijing	Teams C4
Gold medal – first place	2015 Amman	Singles C4
Gold medal – first place	2015 Amman	Teams C4
Silver medal – second place	2007 Seoul	Teams C4
Silver medal – second place	2009 Amman	Singles C4
Silver medal – second place	2009 Amman	Teams C4
Silver medal – second place	2011 Hong Kong	Singles C4
Silver medal – second place	2013 Beijing	Singles C4
FESPIC Championships
Gold medal – first place	2001 Osaka	Teams C4

Choi Il-sang (Korean: 최일상; RR: Choe Ilsang, born 15 July 1975) is a South Korean retired para table tennis player. He won a silver medal at the 2012 Summer Paralympics and a gold at the 2016 Summer Paralympics, both in the Class 4–5 team event.

His disability is congenital. His coach was Choi Kyoung-sik.
