= Kim Jung-gil =

South Korean para table tennis player

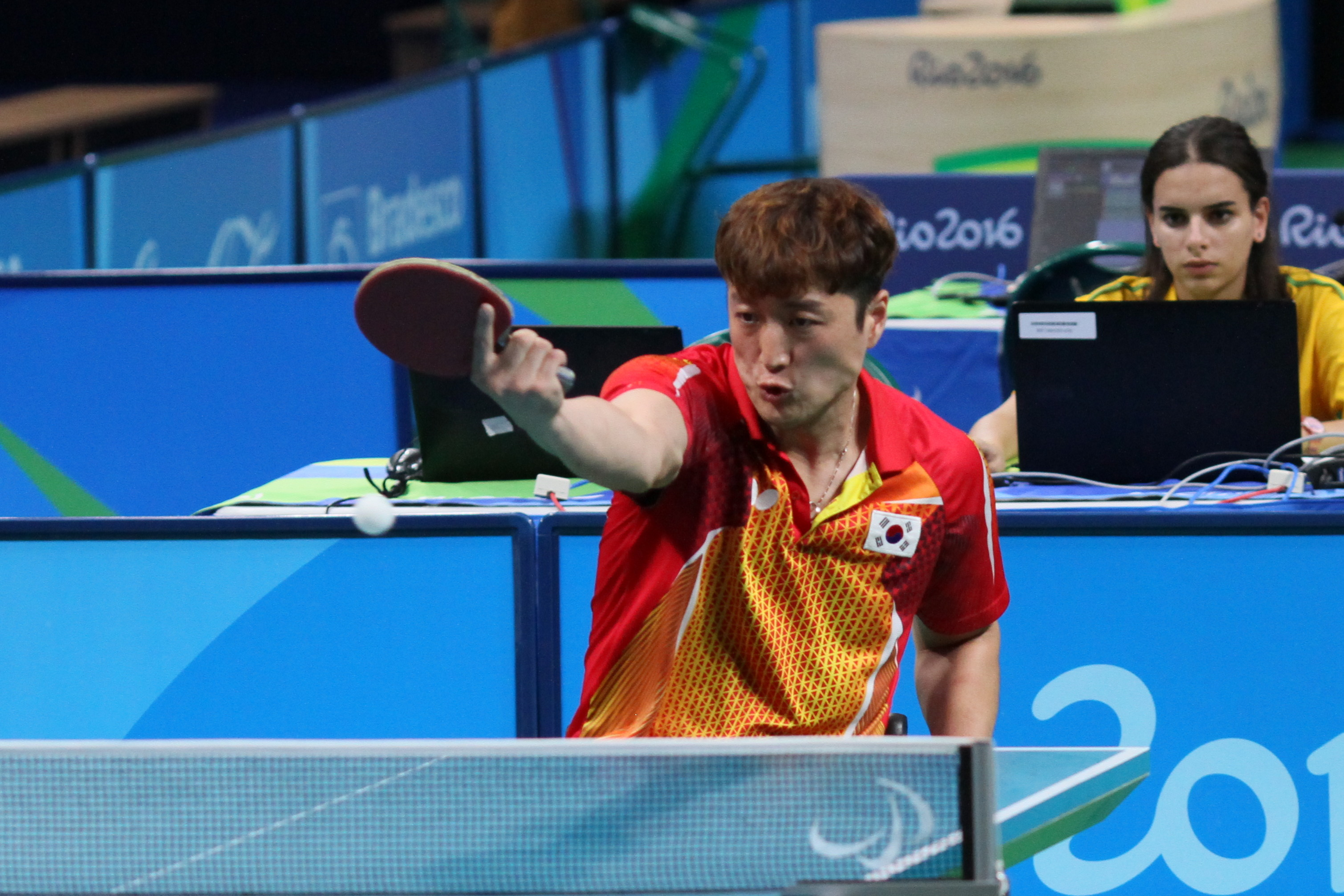
- Kim at the 2016 Summer Paralympics

Personal information
- Born: May 28, 1986 (age 40) Gumi, North Gyeongsang, South Korea
- Height: 183 cm (6 ft 0 in)
- Weight: 70 kg (154 lb)

Sport
- Sport: Table tennis
- Playing style: Right-handed shakehand grip
- Disability class: 4
- Highest ranking: 3 (June 2015)
- Current ranking: 6 (February 2020)
Medal record
Men's para table tennis
Representing South Korea
Paralympic Games
Gold medal – first place	2016 Rio de Janeiro	Teams C4–5
Silver medal – second place	2012 London	Teams C4–5
Bronze medal – third place	2024 Paris	Singles C4
World Championships
Gold medal – first place	2014 Beijing	Teams C4
Silver medal – second place	2010 Gwangju	Singles C4
Silver medal – second place	2010 Gwangju	Teams C4
Asian Para Games
Gold medal – first place	2010 Guangzhou	Teams C4–5
Gold medal – first place	2014 Incheon	Teams C4
Gold medal – first place	2018 Jakarta	Teams C4–5
Silver medal – second place	2010 Guangzhou	Singles C4
Silver medal – second place	2018 Jakarta	Singles C4
Bronze medal – third place	2014 Incheon	Singles C4
Bronze medal – third place	2022 Hangzhou	Singles C4
Asian Championships
Gold medal – first place	2009 Amman	Singles C4
Gold medal – first place	2011 Hong Kong	Teams C4
Gold medal – first place	2017 Beijing	Teams C4
Silver medal – second place	2009 Amman	Teams C4
Silver medal – second place	2017 Beijing	Singles C4

Kim Jung-gil (Korean: 김정길; RR: Gim Jeonggil, born 28 May 1986) is a South Korean para table tennis player. He won a silver medal at the 2012 Summer Paralympics and a gold at the 2016 Summer Paralympics, both in the Class 4–5 team event.

== Personal life ==
He sustained a debilitating injury while riding a mountain bike in 2004. He began playing table tennis two years later.
