= Table tennis at the 2008 Summer Paralympics – Men's individual – Class 4–5 =

Men's Individual Class 4-5 at the XIII Paralympic Games
- Venue: Peking University Gymnasium
- Dates: 7 – 11 September 2008
- Competitors: 36 from 22 nations

Medalists
1st place, gold medalist(s)		Christophe Durand	France
2nd place, silver medalist(s)		Jung Eun Chang	South Korea
3rd place, bronze medalist(s)		Tommy Urhaug	Norway

The Men's Individual Class 4-5 table tennis competition at the 2008 Summer Paralympics was held between 7 September and 11 September at the Peking University Gymnasium.

Classes 1-5 were for athletes with a physical impairment that affected their legs, who competed in a sitting position. The lower the number, the greater the impact the impairment was on an athlete’s ability to compete.

The event was won by Christophe Durand, representing France.

== Results ==
=== Preliminary round ===
Qualified for the knock-out stages

==== Group A ====
Rank	Competitor	MP	W	L	Points	NOR	AUT	SRB
1	Tommy Urhaug (NOR)	2	2	0	6:0	x	3:0	3:0
2	Peter Starl (AUT)	2	1	1	3:5	0:3	x	3:2
3	Ilija Durasinovic (SRB)	2	0	2	2:6	0:3	2:3	x

7 September, 17:20: Tommy Urhaug (NOR) / 11 / 11 / 11; Ilija Durasinovic (SRB) / 5 / 6 / 5	8 September, 12:40: Peter Starl (AUT) / 7 / 11 / 10 / 12 / 12; Ilija Durasinovic (SRB) / 11 / 2 / 12 / 10 / 10	9 September, 12:00: Tommy Urhaug (NOR) / 11 / 11 / 11; Peter Starl (AUT) / 4 / 7 / 6

==== Group B ====
Rank	Competitor	MP	W	L	Points	FRA	JPN	HKG
1	Emeric Martin (FRA)	2	2	0	6:1	x	3:0	3:1
2	Toshihiko Oka (JPN)	2	1	1	3:3	0:3	x	3:0
3	Kwong Kam Shing (HKG)	2	0	2	1:6	1:3	0:3	x

7 September, 17:20: Emeric Martin (FRA) / 11 / 11 / 9 / 11; Kwong Kam Shing F. (HKG) / 6 / 7 / 11 / 4	8 September, 12:40: Toshihiko Oka (JPN) / 12 / 12 / 11; Kwong Kam Shing F. (HKG) / 10 / 10 / 4	9 September, 12:00: Emeric Martin (FRA) / 11 / 14 / 11; Toshihiko Oka (JPN) / 3 / 12 / 7

==== Group C ====
Rank	Competitor	MP	W	L	Points	SWE	TPE	BRA
1	Ernst Bolldén (SWE)	2	2	0	6:0	x	3:0	3:0
2	Lin Wen Hsin (TPE)	2	1	1	3:3	0:3	x	3:0
3	Alexandre Ank (BRA)	2	0	2	0:6	0:3	0:3	x

7 September, 17:20: Ernst Bolldén (SWE) / 11 / 11 / 11; Alexandre Ank (BRA) / 4 / 2 / 5	8 September, 12:40: Lin Wen-hsin (TPE) / 11 / 11 / 11; Alexandre Ank (BRA) / 2 / 9 / 9	9 September, 12:00: Ernst Bolldén (SWE) / 11 / 11 / 11; Lin Wen-hsin (TPE) / 3 / 8 / 6

==== Group D ====
Rank	Competitor	MP	W	L	Points	SVK	KOR	TPE
1	Peter Mihalik (SVK)	2	2	0	6:3	x	3:2	3:1
2	Kim Byoung Young (KOR)	2	1	1	5:3	2:3	x	3:0
3	Chang Chih Jung (TPE)	2	0	2	1:6	1:3	0:3	x

7 September, 17:20: Kim Byoung-young (KOR) / 11 / 11 / 11; Chang Chih-jung (TPE) / 6 / 6 / 4	8 September, 12:40: Peter Mihalik (SVK) / 11 / 11 / 7 / 12; Chang Chih-jung (TPE) / 7 / 7 / 11 / 10	9 September, 12:00: Peter Mihalik (SVK) / 9 / 9 / 12 / 13 / 11; Kim Byoung-young (KOR) / 11 / 11 / 10 / 11 / 9

==== Group E ====
Rank	Competitor	MP	W	L	Points	KOR	BRA	CRO
1	Choi Kyoung Sik (KOR)	2	2	0	6:0	x	3:0	3:0
2	Claudiomiro Segatto (BRA)	2	1	1	3:3	0:3	x	3:0
3	Zoran Krizanec (CRO)	2	0	2	0:6	0:3	0:3	x

7 September, 17:20: Choi Kyoung-sik (KOR) / 11 / 11 / 12; Zoran Krizanec (CRO) / 2 / 4 / 10	8 September, 12:40: Claudiomiro Segatto (BRA) / 11 / 11 / 11; Zoran Krizanec (CRO) / 1 / 9 / 7	9 September, 12:40: Choi Kyoung-sik (KOR) / 13 / 11 / 11; Claudiomiro Segatto (BRA) / 11 / 8 / 9

==== Group F ====
Rank	Competitor	MP	W	L	Points	CHN	TPE	THA
1	Zhang Yan (CHN)	2	2	0	6:0	x	3:0	3:0
2	Lin Yen Hung (TPE)	2	1	1	3:3	0:3	x	3:0
3	Wanchai Chaiwut (THA)	2	0	2	0:6	0:3	0:3	x

7 September, 17:20: Zhang Yan (CHN) / 11 / 11 / 11; Wanchai Chaiwut (THA) / 5 / 4 / 6	8 September, 12:40: Lin Yen-hung (TPE) / 11 / 11 / 11; Wanchai Chaiwut (THA) / 8 / 3 / 3	9 September, 12:40: Zhang Yan (CHN) / 11 / 11 / 11; Lin Yen-hung (TPE) / 9 / 7 / 4

==== Group G ====
Rank	Competitor	MP	W	L	Points	KOR	HKG	ITA
1	Jung Eun Chang (KOR)	2	2	0	6:0	x	3:0	3:0
2	Tsang Tit Hung (HKG)	2	1	1	3:5	0:3	x	3:2
3	Salvatore Caci (ITA)	2	0	2	2:6	0:3	2:3	x

7 September, 17:20: Jung Eun-chang (KOR) / 11 / 11 / 11; Tsang Tit Hung (HKG) / 5 / 8 / 7	8 September, 13:20: Tsang Tit Hung (HKG) / 6 / 8 / 11 / 11 / 11; Salvatore Caci (ITA) / 11 / 11 / 9 / 8 / 9	9 September, 12:40: Jung Eun-chang (KOR) / 11 / 11 / 11; Salvatore Caci (ITA) / 3 / 5 / 7

==== Group H ====
Rank	Competitor	MP	W	L	Points	EGY	FRA	ARG
1	Sameh Saleh (EGY)	2	2	0	6:1	x	3:1	3:0
2	Maxime Thomas (FRA)	2	1	1	4:3	1:3	x	3:0
3	Daniel Rodriguez (ARG)	2	0	2	0:6	0:3	0:3	x

7 September, 17:20: Maxime Thomas (FRA) / 11 / 11 / 11; Daniel Rodriguez (ARG) / 8 / 7 / 7	8 September, 13:20: Sameh Saleh (EGY) / 11 / 11 / 11; Daniel Rodriguez (ARG) / 5 / 4 / 3	9 September, 12:40: Sameh Saleh (EGY) / 8 / 11 / 11 / 11; Maxime Thomas (FRA) / 11 / 8 / 9 / 7

==== Group I ====
Rank	Competitor	MP	W	L	Points	CHN	CZE	BRA
1	Guo Xingyuan (CHN)	2	2	0	6:2	x	3:2	3:0
2	Michal Stefanu (CZE)	2	1	1	5:4	2:3	x	3:1
3	Ivanildo Pessoa Freitas (BRA)	2	0	2	1:6	0:3	1:3	x

7 September, 18:00: Guo Xingyuan (CHN) / 11 / 11 / 11; Ivanildo Pessoa Freitas (BRA) / 3 / 5 / 9	8 September, 13:20: Michal Stefanu (CZE) / 9 / 11 / 11 / 11; Ivanildo Pessoa Freitas (BRA) / 11 / 4 / 1 / 2	9 September, 12:00: Guo Xingyuan (CHN) / 7 / 11 / 11 / 13 / 11; Michal Stefanu (CZE) / 11 / 8 / 5 / 15 / 4

==== Group J ====
Rank	Competitor	MP	W	L	Points	GER	GBR	USA
1	Dietmar Kober (GER)	2	1	1	4:3	x	3:0	1:3
2	Scott Robertson (GBR)	2	1	1	3:3	0:3	x	3:0
3	Andre Scott (USA)	2	1	1	3:4	3:1	0:3	x

7 September, 18:00: Andre Scott (USA) / 13 / 11 / 5 / 11; Dietmar Kober (GER) / 11 / 7 / 11 / 9	8 September, 13:20: Scott Robertson (GBR) / 11 / 11 / 11; Andre Scott (USA) / 8 / 8 / 8	9 September, 12:00: Dietmar Kober (GER) / 11 / 12 / 12; Scott Robertson (GBR) / 6 / 10 / 10

==== Group K ====
Rank	Competitor	MP	W	L	Points	FRA	CHN	NGR
1	Christophe Durand (FRA)	2	2	0	6:2	x	3:2	3:0
2	Bai Gang (CHN)	2	1	1	5:3	2:3	x	3:0
3	Nasiru Sule (NGR)	2	0	2	0:6	0:3	0:3	x

7 September, 18:00: Christophe Durand (FRA) / 11 / 11 / 11; Nasiru Sule (NGR) / 8 / 6 / 5	8 September, 12:40: Bai Gang (CHN) / 11 / 11 / 11; Nasiru Sule (NGR) / 9 / 8 / 3	9 September, 12:00: Christophe Durand (FRA) / 2 / 3 / 11 / 11 / 11; Bai Gang (CHN) / 11 / 11 / 9 / 9 / 9

==== Group L ====
Rank	Competitor	MP	W	L	Points	NOR	GER	SVK
1	Rolf Erik Paulsen (NOR)	2	2	0	6:2	x	3:2	3:0
2	Selcuk Cetin (GER)	2	1	1	5:3	2:3	x	3:0
3	Andrej Mészáros (SVK)	2	0	2	0:6	0:3	0:3	x

7 September, 18:00: Rolf Erik Paulsen (NOR) / 11 / 11 / 11; Andrej Mészáros (SVK) / 5 / 5 / 7	8 September, 12:40: Selcuk Cetin (GER) / 12 / 18 / 11; Andrej Mészáros (SVK) / 10 / 16 / 8	9 September, 12:00: Rolf Erik Paulsen (NOR) / 11 / 11 / 10 / 8 / 11; Selcuk Cetin (GER) / 7 / 7 / 12 / 11 / 7

=== Competition bracket ===
First round: 9 Sep 16:40
Dietmar Kober (GER)	7	13	11	6
Zhang Yan (CHN)	11	15	9	11
Choi Kyoung-sik (KOR)	11	9	9	10
Christophe Durand (FRA)	5	11	11	12
Guo Xingyuan (CHN)	4	4	7
Sameh Saleh (EGY)	11	11	11
Jung Eun-chang (KOR)	10	11	11	11
Rolf Erik Paulsen (NOR)	12	6	4	7

Quarter-finals: 9 Sep 20:00
Tommy Urhaug (NOR)	11	11	9	3	11
Zhang Yan (CHN)	7	9	11	11	4
Christophe Durand (FRA)	11	11	11
Peter Mihalik (SVK)	9	5	5
Ernst Bolldén (SWE)	10	1	11	11	9
Sameh Saleh (EGY)	12	11	9	8	11
Jung Eun-chang (KOR)	3	10	11	11	11
Emeric Martin (FRA)	11	12	4	2	4

Semifinals: 10 Sep 11:30
Tommy Urhaug (NOR)	10	13	11	9	5
Christophe Durand (FRA)	12	11	9	11	11
Sameh Saleh (EGY)	11	7	8	8
Jung Eun-chang (KOR)	9	11	11	11

Gold medal match: 11 Sep 16:00
Christophe Durand (FRA)	11	4	6	11	11
Jung Eun-chang (KOR)	4	11	11	7	3
Bronze medal match: 11 Sep 16:00
Tommy Urhaug (NOR)	11	11	11
Sameh Saleh (EGY)	3	8	6
