= Table tennis at the 2008 Summer Paralympics – Men's team – Class 4–5 =

Men's Team Class 4–5 at the XIII Paralympic Games
- Venue: Peking University Gymnasium
- Dates: 13 – 16 September 2008
- Competitors: 13

Medalists
1st place, gold medalist(s)		Kim Byoung Young; Choi Kyoung Sik; Jung Eun Chang	South Korea
2nd place, silver medalist(s)		Guo Xingyuan; Zhang Yan; Bai Gang	China
3rd place, bronze medalist(s)		Christophe Durand; Emeric Martin; Maxime Thomas	France

The Men's Team Class 4–5 table tennis competition at the 2008 Summer Paralympics was held between 13 September and 16 September at the Peking University Gymnasium. Classes 6–10 were for athletes with a physical impairment who competed from a standing position; the lower the number, the greater the impact the impairment had on an athlete's ability to compete.

The competition was a straight knock-out format. Each tie was decided by the best of a potential five matches, two singles, a doubles (not necessarily the same players) and two reverse singles.

The event was won by the team representing South Korea.

== Competition bracket ==
Round of 16
Italy	2
Serbia	3
Chinese Taipei	3
Brazil	1
Nigeria	1
China	3
Slovakia	0
Sweden	3
Germany	3
Hong Kong	2

Quarterfinals
Norway	3
Serbia	0
Chinese Taipei	0
China	3
South Korea	3
Sweden	2
Germany	0
France	3

Semifinals
Norway	1
China	3
South Korea	3
France	2

Final
China	1
South Korea	3
Third place
Norway	0
France	3

== First round ==
13 September 2008; 12:30	Serbia	3–2	Italy

Report	Individual matches
Zlatko Kesler	3–0	Nicola Molitierno	11–7, 11–5, 11–6
Ilija Durasinovic	1–3	Salvatore Caci	12–10, 8–11, 4–11, 7–11
Zlatko Kesler / Ilija Durasinovic	2–3	Salvatore Caci / Nicola Molitierno	12–10, 11–3, 10–12, 6–11, 10–12
Zlatko Kesler	3–2	Salvatore Caci	11–6, 8–11, 14–12, 6–11, 14–12
Ilija Durasinovic	3–0	Nicola Molitierno	12–10, 11–5, 11–7

13 September 2008; 12:30	Chinese Taipei	3–1	Brazil

Report	Individual matches
Lin Yen-hung	3–0	Ivanildo Pessoa Freitas	11–4, 11–6, 11–7
Lin Wen-hsin	2–3	Claudiomiro Segatto	11–7, 12–10, 10–12, 6–11, 9–11
Lin Wen Hsin / Lin Yen Hung	3–0	Claudiomiro Segatto / Alexandre Ank	11–4, 11–5, 11–5
Lin Yen-hung	3–0	Claudiomiro Segatto	11–3, 11–6, 11–9

13 September 2008; 12:30	Nigeria	1–3	China

Report	Individual matches
Nasiru Sule	2–3	Bai Gang	12–14, 4–11, 11–9, 11–9, 11–13
Oluade Egbinola	0–3	Zhang Yan	5–11, 10–12, 8–11
Nasiru Sule / Oluade Egbinola	3–2	Guo Xingyuan / Zhang Yan	11–4, 11–6, 10–12, 11–13, 11–8
Nasiru Sule	1–3	Zhang Yan	12–10, 7–11, 5–11, 11–13

13 September 2008; 12:30	Sweden	3–0	Slovakia

Report	Individual matches
Ernst Bolldén	3–0	Andrej Mészáros	11–7, 11–9, 11–9
Orjan Kylevik	3–1	Peter Mihalik	4–11, 11–8, 11–7, 12–10
Ernst Bolldén / Orjan Kylevik	3–2	Jan Kosco / Peter Mihalik	7–11, 11–5, 7–11, 11–5, 11–4

13 September 2008; 12:30	Germany	3–2	Hong Kong

Report	Individual matches
Selcuk Cetin	3–0	Tsang Tit Hung	11–7, 11–3, 11–6
Dietmar Kober	2–3	Kwong Kam Shing F.	11–5, 11–7, 9–11, 8–11, 10–12
Selcuk Cetin / Dietmar Kober	3–0	Tsang Tit Hung / Kwong Kam Shing	11–5, 12–10, 11–9
Selcuk Cetin	1–3	Kwong Kam Shing F.	6–11, 11–4, 9–11, 5–11
Dietmar Kober	3–1	Tsang Tit Hung	11–5, 11–2, 5–11, 11–4

== Quarter-finals ==
14 September 2008; 12:30	Norway	3–0	Serbia

Report	Individual matches
Tommy Urhaug	3–0	Ilija Durasinovic	11–8, 11–5, 11–5
Rolf Erik Paulsen	3–1	Zlatko Kesler	11–13, 11–7, 11–3, 11–6
Tommy Urhaug / Rolf Erik Paulsen	3–0	Ilija Durasinovic / Zlatko Kesler	11–5, 11–7, 11–2

14 September 2008; 12:30	China	3–0	Chinese Taipei

Report	Individual matches
Zhang Yan	3–0	Chang Chih-jung	11–4, 11–2, 13–11
Guo Xingyuan	3–0	Lin Yen-hung	11–6, 11–7, 11–7
Zhang Yan / Guo Xingyuan	3–1	Lin Wen Hsin / Lin Yen Hung	12–10, 11–7, 10–12, 14–12

14 September 2008; 12:30	South Korea	3–2	Sweden

Report	Individual matches
Choi Kyoung-sik	3–0	Orjan Kylevik	11–4, 11–9, 11–5
Jung Eun-chang	0–3	Ernst Bolldén	10–12, 10–12, 8–11
Jung Eun Chang / Kim Byoung Young	2–3	Ernst Bolldén / Orjan Kylevik	5–11, 11–5, 11–6, 7–11, 6–11
Choi Kyoung-sik	3–0	Ernst Bolldén	11–3, 11–3, 11–9
Jung Eun-chang	3–0	Orjan Kylevik	11–9, 11–7, 11–4

14 September 2008; 12:30	Germany	0–3	France

Report	Individual matches
Selcuk Cetin	0–3	Christophe Durand	8–11, 4–11, 6–11
Jan Gurtler	0–3	Emeric Martin	2–11, 5–11, 12–14
Selcuk Cetin / Dietmar Kober	1–3	Christophe Durand / Emeric Martin	7–11, 6–11, 11–9, 6–11

== Semi-finals ==
14 September 2008; 19:00	China	3–1	Norway

Report	Individual matches
Zhang Yan	1–3	Tommy Urhaug	9–11, 9–11, 11–7, 7–11
Bai Gang	3–0	Rolf Erik Paulsen	15–13, 13–11, 11–5
Zhang Yan / Guo Xingyuan	3–0	Tommy Urhaug / Rolf Erik Paulsen	11–4, 12–10, 11–6
Zhang Yan	3–0	Rolf Erik Paulsen	11–6, 13–11, 11–5

14 September 2008; 19:00	France	2–3	South Korea

Report	Individual matches
Christophe Durand	3–0	Choi Kyoung-sik	11–9, 11–7, 11–9
Maxime Thomas	2–3	Jung Eun-chang	11–4, 11–2, 9–11, 2–11, 11–13
Christophe Durand / Emeric Martin	0–3	Choi Kyoung Sik / Jung Eun Chang	4–11, 10–12, 5–11
Christophe Durand	3–1	Jung Eun-chang	9–11, 11–9, 12–10, 11–9
Maxime Thomas	1–3	Choi Kyoung-sik	12–14, 11–6, 3–11, 8–11

== Finals ==
Gold medal match

16 September 2008; 16:30	South Korea	3–1	China

Report	Individual matches
Jung Eun-chang	3–2	Guo Xingyuan	7–11, 7–11, 11–5, 11–4, 11–7
Kim Byoung-young	3–2	Zhang Yan	9–11, 11–5, 11–8, 8–11, 11–6
Jung Eun Chang / Choi Kyoung Sik	1–3	Guo Xingyuan / Zhang Yan	10–12, 13–11, 8–11, 8–11
Jung Eun-chang	3–2	Zhang Yan	11–4, 10–12, 11–7, 9–11, 12–10

Bronze medal match

16 September 2008; 16:30	Norway	0–3	France

Report	Individual matches
Tommy Urhaug	0–3	Emeric Martin	5–11, 6–11, 8–11
Rolf Erik Paulsen	1–3	Christophe Durand	8–11, 6–11, 11–3, 9–11
Tommy Urhaug / Rolf Erik Paulsen	1–3	Emeric Martin / Christophe Durand	11–5, 7–11, 9–11, 8–11

== Team Lists ==
Norway; Tommy Urhaug; Rolf Erik Paulsen	Italy; Nicola Molitierno; Salvatore Caci	Serbia; Zlatko Kesler; Ilija Durasinovic	Chinese Taipei; Lin Wen Hsin; Lin Yen Hung
Brazil; Ivanildo Pessoa Freitas; Claudiomiro Segatto; Alexandre Ank	Nigeria; Nasiru Sule; Oluade Egbinola	China; Guo Xingyuan; Zhang Yan; Bai Gang	South Korea; Kim Byoung Young; Choi Kyoung Sik; Jung Eun Chang
Slovakia; Andrej Mészáros; Peter Mihalik; Jan Kosco	Sweden; Orjan Kylevik; Ernst Bolldén	Germany; Selcuk Cetin; Dietmar Kober	Hong Kong; Tsang Tit Hung; Kwong Kam Shing
France; Christophe Durand; Emeric Martin; Maxime Thomas
