= Table tennis at the 2004 Summer Paralympics – Men's team – Class 5 =

Table Tennis - Men's Teams 5 at the XII Paralympic Games
- Paralympic Table Tennis
- Venue: Galatsi Olympic Hall
- Dates: 23–27 September 2004
- Competitors: 12

Medalists
1st place, gold medalist(s)		Rene Taus; Michal Stefanu; Frantisek Glazar	Czech Republic
2nd place, silver medalist(s)		Jung Eun Chang; Kim Byoung Young	South Korea
3rd place, bronze medalist(s)		Gregory Rosec; Christophe Durand	France

The Men's Teams 5 table tennis competition at the 2004 Summer Paralympics was held from 23 to 27 September at the Galatsi Olympic Hall.

Classes 1-5 were for athletes with a physical impairment that affected their legs, who competed in a sitting position. The lower the number, the greater the impact the impairment was on an athlete’s ability to compete.

The event was won by the team representing the Czech Republic.

== Results ==
=== Preliminaries ===
Qualified for final round

==== Group A ====
Rank	Competitor	MP	W	L	Points	KOR	SCG	GBR
1	South Korea	2	2	0	6:0	x	3:0	3:0
2	Serbia and Montenegro	2	1	1	3:4	0:3	x	3:1
3	Great Britain	2	0	2	1:6	0:3	1:3	x

==== Group B ====
Rank	Competitor	MP	W	L	Points	CZE	GER	JPN
1	Czech Republic	2	2	0	6:1	x	3:0	3:1
2	Germany	2	1	1	3:5	0:3	x	3:2
3	Japan	2	0	2	3:6	1:3	2:3	x

==== Group C ====
Rank	Competitor	MP	W	L	Points	FRA	NOR	BRA
1	France	2	2	0	6:1	x	3:1	3:0
2	Norway	2	1	1	4:5	1:3	x	3:2
3	Brazil	2	0	2	2:6	0:3	2:3	x

==== Group D ====
Rank	Competitor	MP	W	L	Points	TPE	SWE	GRE
1	Chinese Taipei	2	2	0	6:0	x	3:0	3:0
2	Sweden	2	1	1	3:3	0:3	x	3:0
3	Greece	2	0	2	0:6	0:3	0:3	x

=== Competition bracket ===
Quarterfinals
South Korea	3
Norway	1
Germany	1
Chinese Taipei	3
France	3
Serbia and Montenegro	1
Sweden	1
Czech Republic	3

Semifinals
South Korea	3
Chinese Taipei	1
France	2
Czech Republic	3

Finals
South Korea	2
Czech Republic	3
Third place
Chinese Taipei	1
France	3

== Team Lists ==
South Korea; Jung Eun Chang; Kim Byoung Young	Serbia and Montenegro; Zlatko Kesler; Ilija Djurasinovic	Great Britain; Arnie Chan; Scott Robertson	Czech Republic; René Tauš; Michal Stefanu; František Glazar
Germany; Selcuk Cetin; Heiko Gosemann	Japan; Nobuhiro Minami; Toshihiko Oka	France; Gregory Rosec; Christophe Durand	Norway; Christian Rosnes; Tommy Urhaug
Brazil; Iranildo Espindola; Roberto Alves	Chinese Taipei; Wu Cheng Sheng; Lin Wen Hsin; Chang Chih Jung; Lin Yen Hung	Sweden; Ernst Bolldén; Patrik Hoegstedt; Oerjan Kylevik	Greece; Antonios Kalyvas; Konstantinos Siachos
