= Table tennis at the 2012 Summer Paralympics – Men's team – Class 4–5 =

Table tennis at the XIV Paralympic Games
- Venue: ExCeL Exhibition Centre
- Dates: September 5–8, 2012
- Competitors: 10 from 10 nations

Medalists
1st place, gold medalist(s)		Cao Ningning; Guo Xingyuan; Zhang Yan	China
2nd place, silver medalist(s)		Jung Eun Chang; Kim Young Gun; Choi Il Sang; Kim Jung Gil	South Korea
3rd place, bronze medalist(s)		Maxime Thomas; Gregory Rosec; Nicolas Savant-Aira; Èmeric Martin	France

The Men's team table tennis - Class 4-5 tournament at the 2012 Summer Paralympics in London took place from 5 September to 8 September 2012 at ExCeL Exhibition Centre. Classes 1-5 were for athletes with a physical impairment that affected their legs, and who competed in a sitting position. The lower the number, the greater the impact the impairment was on an athlete's ability to compete.

== Bracket ==
First Round
1
16
Brazil (BRA)	2
Germany (GER)	3
5
12
13
4
3
14
11
6
Czech Republic (CZE)	3
Slovakia (SVK)	1
15
2

Quarterfinals
China (CHN)	3
Germany (GER)	0
Israel (ISR)	0
France (FRA)	3
Egypt (EGY)	1
Chinese Taipei (TPE)	3
Czech Republic (CZE)	0
South Korea (KOR)	3

Semifinals
China (CHN)	3
France (FRA)	2
Chinese Taipei (TPE)	0
South Korea (KOR)	3

Final (Gold Medal Match)
China (CHN)	3
South Korea (KOR)	1
Bronze Medal Match
France (FRA)	3
Chinese Taipei (TPE)	0

== Results ==
=== First round ===
5 September 2012; 09:00	Brazil	2–3	Germany

Report	Individual matches
Welder Knaf	3–2	Dietmar Kober	10–12, 11–6, 8–11, 11–4, 11–7
Claudiomiro Segatto	1–3	Selcuk Cetin	11–5, 8–11, 6–11, 14–16
Welder Knaf	1–3	Selcuk Cetin	10–12, 13–11, 8–11, 6–11
Claudiomiro Segatto	3–0	Dietmar Kober	11–6, 11–2, 11–6
Welder Knaf / Claudiomiro Segatto	0–3	Dietmar Kober / Selcuk Cetin	8–11, 13–15, 9–11

5 September 2012; 09:00	Czech Republic	3–1	Slovakia

Report	Individual matches
Jaroslav Hadrava	0–3	Peter Mihalik	6–11, 13–15, 7–11
René Tauš	3–0	Andrej Mészáros	11–7, 11–6, 11–6
René Tauš	3–2	Peter Mihalik	5–11, 11–2, 11–8, 6–11, 11–7
Jaroslav Hadrava	3–1	Andrej Mészáros	10–12, 11–8, 11–8, 11–9

=== Quarter-finals ===
6 September 2012; 09:00	China	3–0	Germany

Report	Individual matches
Cao Ningning	3–0	Dietmar Kober	11–6, 13–11, 11–3
Zhang Yan	3–1	Selcuk Cetin	6–11, 11–8, 12–10, 11–5
Cao Ningning	3–0	Selcuk Cetin	11–5, 11–4, 12–10

6 September 2012; 09:00	Israel	0–3	France

Report	Individual matches
Shay Siada	1–3	Nicolas Savant-Aira	17–15, 9–11, 7–11, 9–11
Liran Geva	1–3	Emeric Martin	11–6, 6–11, 6–11, 8–11
Shay Siada	0–3	Emeric Martin	3–11, 5–11, 6–11

6 September 2012; 09:00	Egypt	1–3	Chinese Taipei

Report	Individual matches
Sameh Saleh	3–0	Lin Wen-hsin	11–7, 11–9, 12–10
Ehab Fetir	0–3	Lin Yen-hung	11–13, 8–11, 8–11
Sameh Saleh	0–3	Lin Yen-hung	9–11, 4–11, 7–11
Ehab Fetir	0–3	Lin Wen-hsin	11–13, 9–11, 13–15

6 September 2012; 09:00	Czech Republic	0–3	South Korea

Report	Individual matches
René Tauš	0–3	Kim Jung Gil	4–11, 2–11, 6–11
Jaroslav Hadrava	0–3	Kim Young Gun	5–11, 6–11, 2–11
René Tauš	1–3	Kim Young Gun	11–4, 9–11, 1–11, 4–11

=== Semi-finals ===
6 September 2012; 19:00	China	3–2	France

	Individual matches
Cao Ningning	1–3	Maxime Thomas	10–12, 13–11, 9–11, 9–11
Zhang Yan	3–2	Émeric Martin	12–10, 11–4, 7–11, 10–12, 11–3
Cao Ningning	3–0	Émeric Martin	14–12, 11–9, 11–5
Zhang Yan	1–3	Maxime Thomas	5–11, 11–13, 11–8, 8–11
Cao Ningning / Zhang Yan	3–2	Maxime Thomas / Émeric Martin	9–11, 11–5, 11–4, 11–13, 12–10

6 September 2012; 19:00	Chinese Taipei	0–3	South Korea

Report	Individual matches
Yen-Hung Lin	2–3	Il Sang Choi	17–15, 11–8, 8–11, 7–11, 6–11
Kun-Nan Ko	1–3	Kim Young Gun	5–11, 5–11, 11–9, 5–11
Yen-Hung Lin	1–3	Kim Young Gun	7–11, 11–5, 3–11, 3–11

=== Finals ===
Gold medal match

8 September 2012; 12:30	China	3–1	South Korea

Report	Individual matches
Cao Ningning	3–0	Jung Eun Chang	11–7, 11–3, 11–4
Zhang Yan	0–3	Kim Young Gun	5–6–11, 6–11, 8–11
Cao Ningning	3–0	Kim Young Gun	11–7, 11–6, 11–4
Zhang Yan	3–1	Jung Eun Chang	7–11, 11–5, 11–7, 11–9

Bronze medal match

6 September 2012; 12:30	France	3–0	Chinese Taipei

Report	Individual matches
Maxime Thomas	3–0	Wen-Hsin Lin	11–5, 12–10, 11–3
Émeric Martin	3–2	Yen-Hung Lin	11–8, 6–11, 11–6, 9–11, 11–8
Maxime Thomas	3–0	Yen-Hung Lin	11–7, 11–5, 11–8
