= Table tennis at the 2004 Summer Paralympics – Men's individual – Class 5 =

Table Tennis - Men's Singles 5 at the XII Paralympic Games
- Paralympic Table Tennis
- Venue: Galatsi Olympic Hall
- Dates: 18–21 September 2004
- Competitors: 22 from 17 nations

Medalists
1st place, gold medalist(s)		Kim Byoung Young	South Korea
2nd place, silver medalist(s)		Jung Eun Chang	South Korea
3rd place, bronze medalist(s)		Christophe Durand	France

The Men's Singles 5 table tennis competition at the 2004 Summer Paralympics was held from 18 to 21 September at the Galatsi Olympic Hall.

Classes 1-5 were for athletes with a physical impairment that affected their legs, who competed in a sitting position. The lower the number, the greater the impact the impairment was on an athlete's ability to compete.

The event was won by Kim Byoung Young, representing South Korea.

== Results ==
=== Preliminaries ===
Qualified for final round

==== Group A ====
Rank	Competitor	MP	W	L	Points	NOR	FRA	CZE
1	Tommy Urhaug (NOR)	2	2	0	6:2	x	3:2	3:0
2	Gregory Rosec (FRA)	2	1	1	5:4	2:3	x	3:1
3	Rene Taus (CZE)	2	0	2	1:6	0:3	1:3	x

==== Group B ====
Rank	Competitor	MP	W	L	Points	FRA	HKG	GBR
1	Christophe Durand (FRA)	2	2	0	6:1	x	3:0	3:1
2	Kwong Kam Shing (HKG)	2	1	1	3:3	0:3	x	3:0
3	Scott Robertson (GBR)	2	0	2	1:6	1:3	0:3	x

==== Group C ====
Rank	Competitor	MP	W	L	Points	ESP	SWE	RSA	GRE
1	Manuel Robles (ESP)	3	3	0	9:1	x	3:0	3:1	3:0
2	Ernst Bolldén (SWE)	3	2	1	6:4	0:3	x	3:1	3:0
3	Mark Nilsen (RSA)	3	1	2	5:6	1:3	1:3	x	3:0
4	Antonios Kalyvas (GRE)	3	0	3	0:9	0:3	0:3	0:3	x

==== Group D ====
Rank	Competitor	MP	W	L	Points	KOR	SCG	MEX	SWE
1	Kim Byoung Young (KOR)	3	3	0	9:0	x	3:0	3:0	3:0
2	Ilija Djurasinovic (SCG)	3	2	1	6:5	0:3	x	3:0	3:2
3	Mario Pazaran (MEX)	3	1	2	3:7	0:3	0:3	x	3:1
4	Patrik Hoegstedt (SWE)	3	0	3	3:9	0:3	2:3	1:3	x

==== Group E ====
Rank	Competitor	MP	W	L	Points	JPN	TPE	GER	BRA
1	Toshihiko Oka (JPN)	3	2	1	8:4	x	3:1	2:3	3:0
2	Lin Yen Hung (TPE)	3	2	1	7:3	1:3	x	3:0	3:0
3	Heiko Gosemann (GER)	3	2	1	6:5	3:2	0:3	x	3:0
4	Roberto Alves (BRA)	3	0	3	0:9	0:3	0:3	0:3	x

==== Group F ====
Rank	Competitor	MP	W	L	Points	KOR	TPE	GER	CRO
1	Jung Eun Chang (KOR)	3	3	0	9:2	x	3:0	3:0	3:2
2	Chang Chih Jung (TPE)	3	2	1	6:7	0:3	x	3:2	3:2
3	Selcuk Cetin (GER)	3	1	2	5:7	0:3	2:3	x	3:1
4	Zoran Krizanec (CRO)	3	0	3	5:9	2:3	2:3	1:3	x

=== Competition bracket ===
Round of 16
Toshihiko Oka (JPN)	0
Kwong Kam Shing (HKG)	3
Jung Eun Chang (KOR)	3
Ilija Djurasinovic (SCG)	0
Gregory Rosec (FRA)	0
Lin Yen Hung (TPE)	3
Ernst Bolldén (SWE)	1
Chang Chih Jung (TPE)	3

Quarterfinals
Tommy Urhaug (NOR)	2
Kwong Kam Shing (HKG)	3
Jung Eun Chang (KOR)	3
Manuel Robles (ESP)	2
Kim Byoung Young (KOR)	3
Lin Yen Hung (TPE)	1
Chang Chih Jung (TPE)	2
Christophe Durand (FRA)	3

Semifinals
Kwong Kam Shing (HKG)	0
Jung Eun Chang (KOR)	3
Kim Byoung Young (KOR)	3
Christophe Durand (FRA)	0

Final
Jung Eun Chang (KOR)	2
Kim Byoung Young (KOR)	3
Third place
Kwong Kam Shing (HKG)^{[1]}
Christophe Durand (FRA)

^{[1]} Disqualified for excessive use of prohibited solvents on rackets
