= Lian Hao =

Chinese para table tennis player

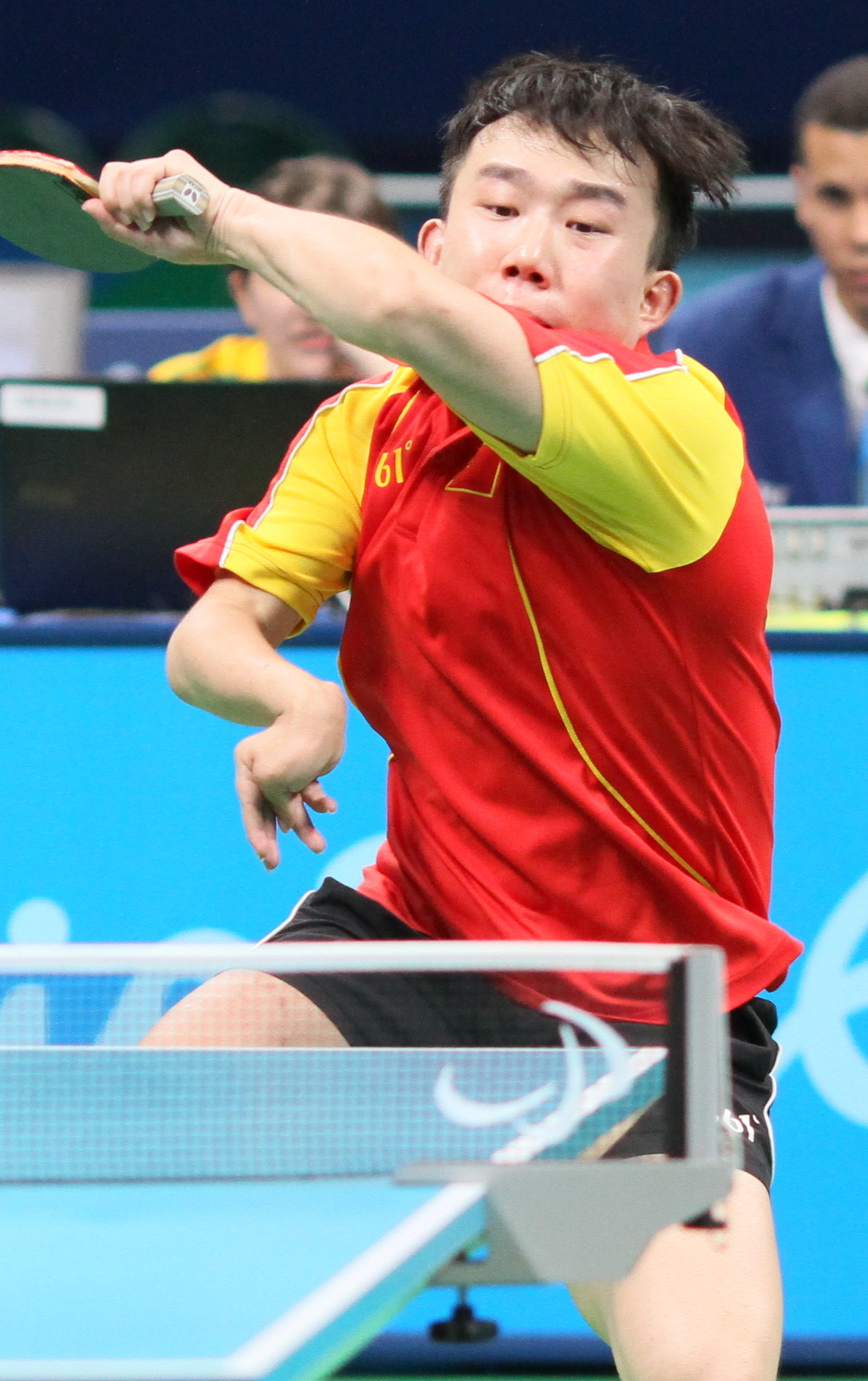
- Lian at the 2016 Summer Paralympics

Personal information
- Born: June 7, 1995 (age 31) Lanzhou, Gansu, China
- Height: 168 cm (5 ft 6 in)
- Weight: 63 kg (139 lb)

Sport
- Sport: Table tennis
- Playing style: Right-handed shakehand grip
- Disability class: 10
- Highest ranking: 3 (October 2019)
- Current ranking: 6 (February 2020)
Medal record
Men's para table tennis
Representing China
Paralympic Games
Gold medal – first place	2012 London	Teams C9–10
Gold medal – first place	2016 Rio de Janeiro	Teams C9–10
Gold medal – first place	2020 Tokyo	Teams C9-10
Silver medal – second place	2024 Paris	Men's singles C10
Bronze medal – third place	2024 Paris	Doubles MD18
World Championships
Bronze medal – third place	2018 Lasko	Singles C10
Asian Para Games
Gold medal – first place	2010 Guangzhou	Teams C9–10
Gold medal – first place	2014 Incheon	Teams C9–10
Gold medal – first place	2022 Hangzhou	Singles C10
Gold medal – first place	2022 Hangzhou	Doubles MD14
Silver medal – second place	2010 Guangzhou	Singles C10
Silver medal – second place	2018 Jakarta	Singles C10
Silver medal – second place	2018 Jakarta	Teams C9–10
Silver medal – second place	2022 Hangzhou	Doubles XD17-20
Asian Championships
Gold medal – first place	2009 Amman	Teams C10
Gold medal – first place	2011 Hong Kong	Teams C10
Gold medal – first place	2015 Amman	Teams C10
Gold medal – first place	2017 Beijing	Singles C10
Gold medal – first place	2017 Beijing	Teams C10
Silver medal – second place	2009 Amman	Singles C10
Silver medal – second place	2011 Hong Kong	Singles C10
Silver medal – second place	2019 Taichung	Teams C10
Bronze medal – third place	2009 Amman	Open singles standing
Bronze medal – third place	2015 Amman	Singles C10
Bronze medal – third place	2019 Taichung	Singles C10

Lian Hao
- Traditional Chinese: 連浩
- Simplified Chinese: 连浩
Transcriptions
Standard Mandarin
- Hanyu Pinyin: Lián Hào

Lian Hao (Chinese: 连浩, born 7 June 1995) is a Chinese para table tennis player. He is a three-time Paralympic gold medalist.

== Personal life ==
Lian was born with abnormalities in his right arm. He started the sport at the table tennis club ran by his uncle. He attended Shaanxi Normal University.
