= Mao Jingdian =

Chinese para table tennis player

Personal information
- Born: 27 February 1995 (age 31) Taixing, Jiangsu, China
- Height: 170 cm (5 ft 7 in)
- Weight: 60 kg (132 lb)

Sport
- Sport: Table tennis
- Playing style: Right-handed shakehand grip
- Disability class: 8
- Highest ranking: 1 (April 2015)
- Current ranking: 1
Medal record
Women's para table tennis
Representing China
Paralympic Games
Gold medal – first place	2012 London	Singles C8
Gold medal – first place	2016 Rio de Janeiro	Singles C8
Gold medal – first place	2020 Tokyo	Singles C8
Gold medal – first place	2020 Tokyo	Teams C6-8
Gold medal – first place	2024 Paris	Doubles XD17
World Championships
Gold medal – first place	2014 Beijing	Singles C8
Gold medal – first place	2018 Lasko	Singles C8
Asian Para Games
Gold medal – first place	2010 Guangzhou	Singles C6-8
Gold medal – first place	2014 Incheon	Singles C8
Gold medal – first place	2014 Incheon	Teams C6-8
Gold medal – first place	2018 Jakarta	Singles C8
Gold medal – first place	2022 Hangzhou	Singles C9
Bronze medal – third place	2018 Jakarta	Teams C8-10
Asian Championships
Gold medal – first place	2015 Amman	Singles C8
Gold medal – first place	2017 Beijing	Singles C8
Gold medal – first place	2017 Beijing	Teams C6-8
Gold medal – first place	2019 Taichung	Singles C8
Gold medal – first place	2019 Taichung	Teams C8
Asian and Oceanic Championships
Gold medal – first place	2009 Amman	Singles C6-8
Gold medal – first place	2009 Amman	Teams C6-10
Gold medal – first place	2011 Hong Kong	Singles C6-8

Mao Jingdian
- Traditional Chinese: 茅經典
- Simplified Chinese: 茅经典
Transcriptions
Standard Mandarin
- Hanyu Pinyin: Máo Jīngdiǎn

Mao Jingdian (Chinese: 茅经典, born 27 February 1995) is a Chinese para table tennis player.

== Career ==
She won the gold medal in the women's individual C8 event at the 2012 Summer Paralympics and the same event at the 2016 Summer Paralympics. She also represented China at the 2020 Summer Paralympics in Tokyo, Japan and won the gold medal in the women's individual C8 event.

She has won numerous titles at the Asia and Oceania Championships (in 2009 and 2011), Asian Para Games (in 2010, 2014 and 2018) and the Asian Championships (in 2017 and 2019).

== Personal life ==
Mao was a table tennis prodigy before her disability. She represented her home province Jiangsu in national competitions in 2005, when she was 10 years old. However, later that year, an injury and a misdiagnosis caused a dislocated hip, which forced her retirement. She began playing seriously again after meeting para table tennis coach Yuan Feng in 2009.
