= Table tennis at the 2012 Summer Paralympics – Men's individual – Class 5 =

Table tennis at the XIV Paralympic Games
- Venue: ExCeL London
- Dates: 30 August – 3 September 2012
- Competitors: 12 from 10 nations

Medalists
| 1st place, gold medalist(s) | | Tommy Urhaug | Norway |
| 2nd place, silver medalist(s) | | Cao Ningning | China |
| 3rd place, bronze medalist(s) | | Eun-Chang Jung | South Korea |

The Men's individual table tennis – Class 5 tournament at the 2012 Summer Paralympics in London took place from 30 August to 2 September 2012 at ExCeL London. Classes 1-5 were for athletes with a physical impairment that affected their legs, and who competed in a sitting position. The lower the number, the greater the impact the impairment was on an athlete’s ability to compete.

In the preliminary stage, athletes competed in four groups of three. Winners of each group qualified for the semi-finals.

== Results ==
All times are local (BST/UTC+1)

=== Finals ===
Semifinals: 1 September 19:45
A1 | Cao Ningning (CHN) | 11 | 7 | 11 | 11
D1 | Gregory Rosec (FRA) | 6 | 11 | 8 | 7
C1 | Eun-Chang Jung (KOR) | 6 | 7 | 6
B1 | Tommy Urhaug (NOR) | 11 | 11 | 11

Gold medal match: 2 September 16:30
A1 | Cao Ningning (CHN) | 11 | 7 | 7 | 9
B1 | Tommy Urhaug (NOR) | 8 | 11 | 11 | 11
Bronze medal match
D1 | Gregory Rosec (FRA) | 9 | 7 | 11
C1 | Eun-Chang Jung (KOR) | 11 | 11 | 13

=== Preliminary round ===
| Qualified for the semifinals |

==== Group A ====
| Athlete | Won | Lost | Points diff |
|---|---|---|---|
| Cao Ningning (CHN) | 2 | 0 | +20 |
| Rene Taus (CZE) | 1 | 1 | +8 |
| Scott Robertson (GBR) | 0 | 2 | -28 |

30 August, 16:40

| Cao Ningning (CHN) | 7 | 11 | 11 | 11 |
| Scott Robertson (GBR) | 11 | 6 | 4 | 9 |

31 August, 09:40

| Scott Robertson (GBR) | 8 | 1 | 6 |
| Rene Taus (CZE) | 11 | 11 | 11 |

1 September, 09:40

| Cao Ningning (CHN) | 11 | 7 | 11 | 11 |
| Rene Taus (CZE) | 7 | 11 | 5 | 7 |

==== Group B ====
| Athlete | Won | Lost | Points diff |
|---|---|---|---|
| Tommy Urhaug (NOR) | 2 | 0 | +28 |
| Nicolas Savant-Aira (FRA) | 1 | 1 | -8 |
| Claudiomiro Segatto (BRA) | 0 | 2 | -20 |

30 August, 16:40

| Tommy Urhaug (NOR) | 11 | 11 | 11 |
| Claudiomiro Segatto (BRA) | 7 | 3 | 5 |

31 August, 09:40

| Claudiomiro Segatto (BRA) | 11 | 7 | 11 | 9 | 6 |
| Nicolas Savant-Aira (FRA) | 7 | 11 | 6 | 11 | |

1 September, 09:40

| Tommy Urhaug (NOR) | 11 | 15 | 11 |
| Nicolas Savant-Aira (FRA) | 7 | 13 | 7 |

==== Group C ====
| Athlete | Won | Lost | Points diff |
|---|---|---|---|
| Eun-Chang Jung (KOR) | 2 | 0 | +5 |
| Lin Yen-hung (TPE) | 1 | 1 | +3 |
| Ehab Fetir (EGY) | 0 | 2 | -8 |

30 August, 17:20

| Eun-Chang Jung (KOR) | 11 | 5 | 11 | 11 |
| Ehab Fetir (EGY) | 9 | 11 | 8 | 8 |

31 August, 10:20

| Ehab Fetir (EGY) | 8 | 11 | 5 | 11 | 4 |
| Lin Yen-hung (TPE) | 11 | 3 | 11 | 9 | 11 |

1 September, 09:40

| Eun-Chang Jung (KOR) | 8 | 11 | 11 | 5 | 11 |
| Lin Yen-hung (TPE) | 11 | 9 | 7 | 11 | 5 |

==== Group D ====
| Athlete | Won | Lost | Points diff |
|---|---|---|---|
| Gregory Rosec (FRA) | 2 | 0 | +17 |
| Selcuk Cetin (GER) | 1 | 1 | -7 |
| Kim Byoung Young (KOR) | 0 | 2 | -10 |

30 August, 17:20

| Kim Byoung Young (KOR) | 11 | 12 | 8 | 11 | 9 |
| Selcuk Cetin (GER) | 4 | 10 | 11 | 13 | 11 |

31 August, 10:20

| Selcuk Cetin (GER) | 11 | 7 | 10 | 8 |
| Gregory Rosec (FRA) | 7 | 11 | 12 | 11 |

1 September, 09:40

| Kim Byoung Young (KOR) | 5 | 11 | 4 | 9 |
| Gregory Rosec (FRA) | 11 | 8 | 11 | 11 |
