= Zhang Yan (table tennis) =

Chinese para table tennis player

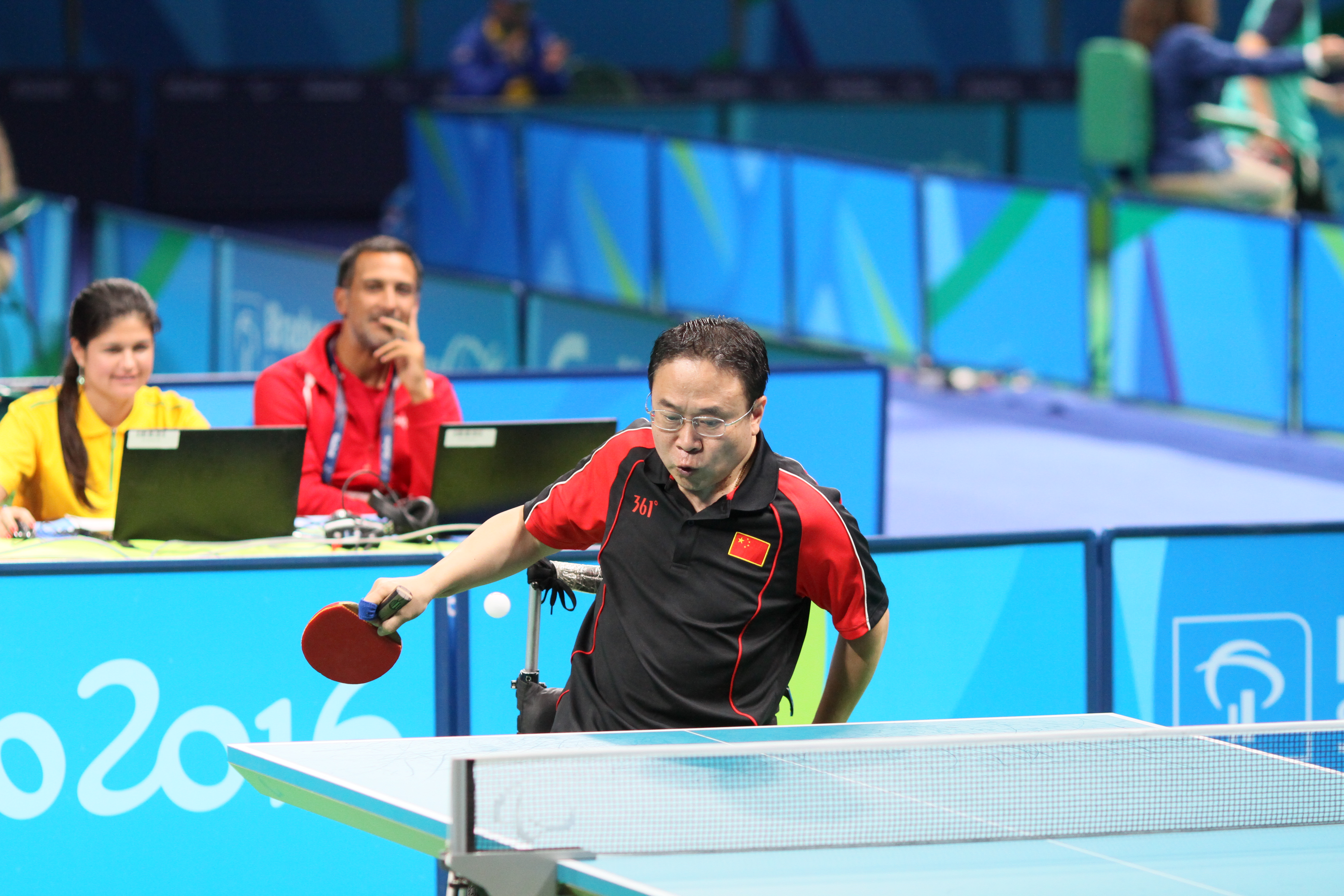
- Zhang at the 2016 Summer Paralympics

Personal information
- Born: July 25, 1967 (age 59) Xinxiang, Henan, China
- Height: 160 cm (5 ft 3 in)
- Weight: 65 kg (143 lb)

Sport
- Sport: Table tennis
- Playing style: Right-handed penhold
- Disability class: 4
- Highest ranking: 2 (July 2007)
- Current ranking: 7 (February 2020)
Medal record
Men's para table tennis
Representing China
Paralympic Games
Gold medal – first place	2004 Athens	Singles C4
Gold medal – first place	2012 London	Teams C4–5
Silver medal – second place	2008 Beijing	Teams C4–5
Silver medal – second place	2012 London	Singles C4
Bronze medal – third place	2004 Athens	Teams C4
World Championships
Gold medal – first place	2006 Montreux	Teams C4
Gold medal – first place	2014 Beijing	Teams C5
Bronze medal – third place	2018 Laško	Singles C4
Asian Para Games
Gold medal – first place	2014 Incheon	Teams C5
Silver medal – second place	2010 Guangzhou	Teams C4–5
Silver medal – second place	2018 Jakarta	Teams C4–5
Bronze medal – third place	2010 Guangzhou	Singles C4
Bronze medal – third place	2014 Incheon	Singles C4
Bronze medal – third place	2018 Jakarta	Singles C4
FESPIC Games
Gold medal – first place	2002 Busan	Singles C4
Gold medal – first place	2002 Busan	Teams C4
Asian Championships
Gold medal – first place	2007 Seoul	Teams C4
Gold medal – first place	2009 Amman	Open singles in wheelchair
Gold medal – first place	2009 Amman	Teams C4
Gold medal – first place	2015 Amman	Teams C5
Silver medal – second place	2005 Kuala Lumpur	Teams C4
Silver medal – second place	2011 Hong Kong	Teams C4
Silver medal – second place	2013 Beijing	Teams C4
Silver medal – second place	2015 Amman	Singles C4
Silver medal – second place	2017 Beijing	Teams C4
Bronze medal – third place	2005 Kuala Lumpur	Singles C4
Bronze medal – third place	2011 Hong Kong	Singles C4
Bronze medal – third place	2013 Beijing	Singles C4
Bronze medal – third place	2017 Beijing	Singles C4
Bronze medal – third place	2019 Taichung	Singles C4
Bronze medal – third place	2019 Taichung	Teams C4
FESPIC Championships
Gold medal – first place	2003 Shanghai	Singles C4
Silver medal – second place	2003 Shanghai	Teams C4

Zhang Yan
- Traditional Chinese: 張岩
- Simplified Chinese: 张岩
Transcriptions
Standard Mandarin
- Hanyu Pinyin: Zhāng Yán

Zhang Yan (Chinese: 张岩, born 25 July 1967) is a Chinese para table tennis player. He has won five medals from three Paralympic Games (2004, 2008, and 2012).

As a child, Zhang displayed special talent in table tennis, and he was selected to the Zhengzhou youth team, living away from home, when he was just eight years old. When he was ten years old, he had an acute onset of rheumatoid arthritis, which slowly debilitated him.

== Personal life ==
Zhang Yan is married to his national teammate Ren Guixiang. They have a daughter together.
