= Christophe Durand =

French Paralympic table tennis player

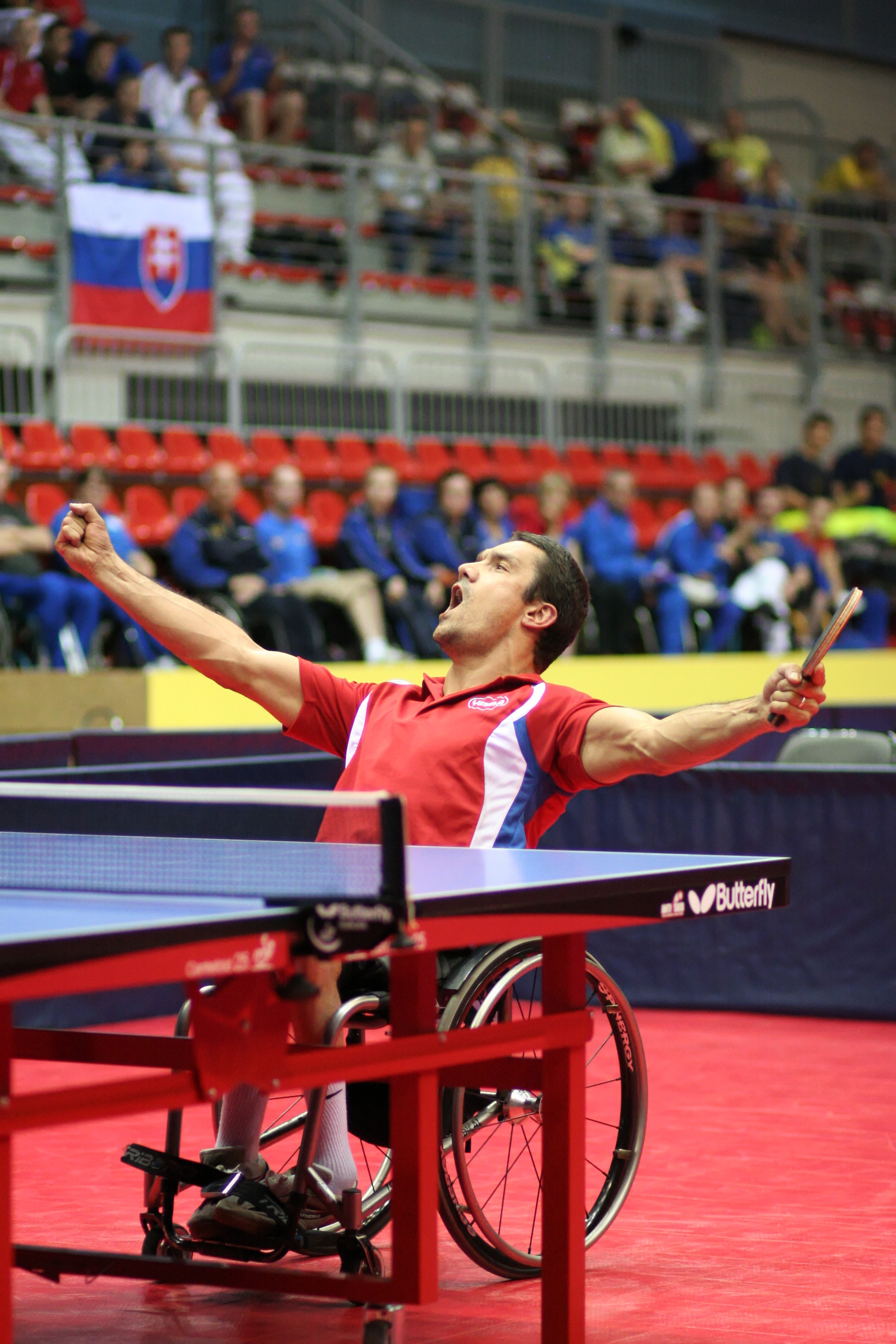

Personal information
- Nationality: French
- Born: 5 April 1973 (age 53) Décines-Charpieu

Sport
- Country: France
- Sport: Table tennis
Medal record
Table tennis (class 4/5)
Representing France
Paralympic Games
Gold medal – first place	2000 Sydney	individual
Gold medal – first place	2008 Beijing	individual
Silver medal – second place	1996 Atlanta	team
Bronze medal – third place	2004 Athens	individual
Bronze medal – third place	2004 Athens	team
Bronze medal – third place	2008 Beijing	individual

Christophe Durand (born 5 April 1973 in Décines-Charpieu) is a French table tennis player.

He won his first Paralympic medal, a gold, at the 2000 Summer Paralympic Games. At the 2004 Games, he won a bronze in the individual event, and another in the team event. He represented France again at the 2008 Summer Paralympics, in class 4/5, and won gold by defeating South Korea's Jung Eun-Chang in five sets.
