= Guo Xingyuan =

Chinese para table tennis player

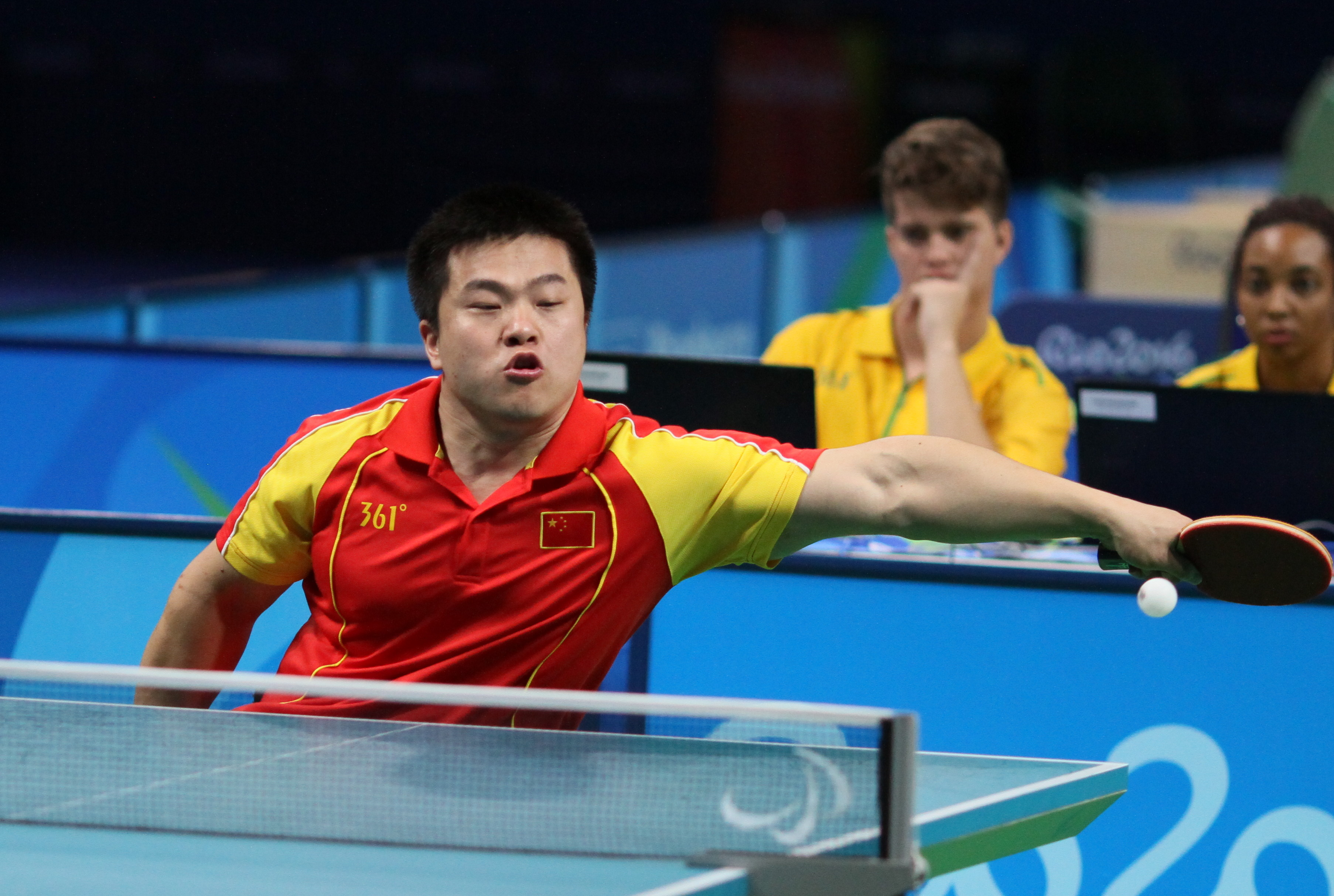
- Guo at the 2016 Summer Paralympics

Personal information
- Born: 20 October 1988 (age 37) Pizhou, Jiangsu, China
- Height: 165 cm (5 ft 5 in)
- Weight: 64 kg (141 lb)

Sport
- Sport: Table tennis
- Playing style: Left-handed shakehand grip
- Disability class: 4
- Highest ranking: 2 (July 2011)
- Current ranking: 11 (February 2020)
Medal record
Men's para table tennis
Representing China
Paralympic Games
| Gold medal – first place | 2012 London | Teams C4–5 |
| Silver medal – second place | 2008 Beijing | Teams C4–5 |
| Silver medal – second place | 2016 Rio de Janeiro | Singles C4 |
World Championships
| Gold medal – first place | 2006 Montreux | Teams C4 |
| Gold medal – first place | 2010 Gwangju | Singles C4 |
| Gold medal – first place | 2014 Beijing | Teams C5 |
| Silver medal – second place | 2010 Gwangju | Open singles in wheelchair |
| Bronze medal – third place | 2006 Montreux | Singles C4 |
Asian Para Games
| Gold medal – first place | 2014 Incheon | Teams C5 |
| Silver medal – second place | 2010 Guangzhou | Teams C4–5 |
Asian Championships
| Gold medal – first place | 2005 Kuala Lumpur | Singles C4 |
| Gold medal – first place | 2007 Seoul | Teams C4 |
| Gold medal – first place | 2009 Amman | Teams C4 |
| Silver medal – second place | 2005 Kuala Lumpur | Teams C4 |
| Silver medal – second place | 2011 Hong Kong | Teams C4 |
| Silver medal – second place | 2013 Beijing | Teams C4 |
| Silver medal – second place | 2017 Beijing | Teams C4 |
| Bronze medal – third place | 2007 Seoul | Open singles in wheelchair |
| Bronze medal – third place | 2009 Amman | Singles C4 |
| Bronze medal – third place | 2013 Beijing | Singles C4 |
| Bronze medal – third place | 2015 Amman | Singles C4 |
| Bronze medal – third place | 2017 Beijing | Singles C4 |
| Bronze medal – third place | 2019 Taichung | Teams C4 |
FESPIC Championships
| Silver medal – second place | 2003 Shanghai | Singles C4 |
| Silver medal – second place | 2003 Shanghai | Teams C4 |

Guo Xingyuan
- Traditional Chinese: 郭興元
- Simplified Chinese: 郭兴元
Transcriptions
Standard Mandarin
- Hanyu Pinyin: Guō Xīngyuán

Guo Xingyuan (Chinese: 郭兴元, born 20 October 1988) is a Chinese para table tennis player. He has won one gold medal and two silver medals from three Paralympic Games (2008, 2012, and 2016).

Like many of his teammates, Guo was a polio survivor from Pizhou who attended New Hope Center as a child. That's where coach Heng Xin developed him into a star.
