= Table tennis at the 2010 Asian Para Games =

Para table tennis at the 2010 Asian Para Games
- Venue: Asian Games Town Gymnasium
- Location: Guangzhou, China
- Dates: 14–19 December
- Competitors: 186 from 25 nations

Table tennis at the 2010 Asian Para Games were held in Asian Games Town Gymnasium from December 14 to December 19. There were 20 gold medals in this sport.

== Medal summary ==
=== Medal table ===
Rank	Nation	Gold	Silver	Bronze	Total
1	China (CHN)	19	8	8	35
2	South Korea (KOR)	1	8	3	12
3	Chinese Taipei (TPE)	0	1	3	4
4	Iran (IRI)	0	1	1	2
4	Thailand (THA)	0	1	1	2
6	Philippines (PHI)	0	1	0	1
7	Hong Kong (HKG)	0	0	1	1
7	Indonesia (INA)	0	0	1	1
7	Malaysia (MAS)	0	0	1	1
7	Vietnam (VIE)	0	0	1	1
Totals (10 entries)		20	20	20	60

=== Men's events ===
Event	Gold	Silver	Bronze
Singles TT 1-3	Feng Panfeng; China	Kim Young-Gun; South Korea	Ko Hang Yee; Hong Kong
Singles TT 4	Cao Ningning; China	Kim Jung-Gil; South Korea	Zhang Yan; China
Singles TT 5	Bai Gang; China	Javad Fouladitarghi; Iran	Kim Byoung-Young; South Korea
Singles TT 6-7	Liao Keli; China	Rungroj Thainiyom; Thailand	Chen Chao; China
Singles TT 8	Zhao Shuai; China	Ye Chaoqun; China	Sun Churen; China
Singles TT 9	Ma Lin; China	Zhao Yiqing; China	Han Yajie; China
Singles TT 10	Ge Yang; China	Lian Hao; China	David Jacobs; Indonesia
Team TT 1-3	China (CHN); Feng Panfeng; Gao Yanming; Jin Jun; Zhao Ping	South Korea (KOR); Jung Young-Il; Kim Jeong-seok; Kim Young-Gun	Thailand (THA); Anurak Laowong; Wittaya Wichaiwattana
Team TT 4-5	South Korea (KOR); Choi Il-Sang; Jung Eun-Chang; Kim Byoung-Young; Kim Jung-Gil	China (CHN); Bai Gang; Cao Ningning; Guo Xingyuan; Zhang Yan	Chinese Taipei (TPE); Ko Kun Nan; Lin Wen Hsin; Lin Yen Hung
Team TT 6-8	China (CHN); Li Manzhou; Sun Churen; Ye Chaoqun; Zhao Shuai	South Korea (KOR); Kim Kwang-jin; Kim Young-Sung; Lee Cheon-Sik; Son Jin-Kwang	Chinese Taipei (TPE); Hou Ting Sung; Hu Ming Fu
Team TT 9-10	China (CHN); Lian Hao; Lv Xiaolei; Ma Lin; Yan Shuo	Chinese Taipei (TPE); Ju Ren Der; Lee Yao Tang; Lu Weichen	Malaysia (MAS); Mohamad Azwar Bakar; Hong Chin Sing; Koh Zhi Liang; Ting Ing Hock

=== Women's events ===
Event	Gold	Silver	Bronze
Singles TT 1-3	Li Qian; China	Liu Jing; China	Jung Sang-Sook; South Korea
Singles TT 4	Zhou Ying; China	Moon Sung-Hye; South Korea	Zhang Miao; China
Singles TT 5	Gu Gai; China	Ren Guixiang; China	Zhang Bian; China
Singles TT 6-8	Mao Jingdian; China	Josephine Medina; Philippines	Jiang Shan; China
Singles TT 9	Liu Meili; China	Liu Meng; China	Lei Lina; China
Singles TT 10	Yang Qian; China	Liu Xu; China	Kim Kun-Hea; South Korea
Team TT 1-3	China (CHN); Li Qian; Liu Jing	South Korea (KOR); Choi Hyun-Ja; Jung Sang-Sook; Kim Sun-ja	Iran (IRI); Forough Bakhtiary; Elham Chazanisharahi
Team TT 4-5	China (CHN); Gu Gai; Ren Guixiang; Zhang Bian; Zhang Miao	South Korea (KOR); Jung Ji-Nam; Jung Young-A; Kim Young-Soon; Moon Sung-Hye	Chinese Taipei (TPE); Lee Ya Chu; Lu Pi Chun; Wei Mei Hui
Team TT 6-10	China (CHN); Fan Lei; Hou Chunxiao; Yang Qian; Yu Hailian	South Korea (KOR); Kim Kun-Hea; Kim Mi-Soon; Lee Wol-Soon	Vietnam (VIE); Nguyen Thi Hoa Phuong; Viet Thi Kim van

== Results ==
=== Men ===
==== Men's singles TT 1-3 ====
===== Groups =====
Group A

Rank	Athlete	Pts	W	L	Games W/L	Points W/L
1	Feng Panfeng (CHN)	4	2	0	6 / 0	66 / 16
2	Awadh Al-Harbi (KUW)	3	1	1	3 / 3	41 / 51
3	Elie El-Rahbany (LIB)	2	0	2	0 / 6	26 / 66

Group B

Rank	Athlete	Pts	W	L	Games W/L	Points W/L
1	Kim Young-Gun (KOR)	4	2	0	6 / 0	66 / 36
2	Gao Yanming (CHN)	3	1	1	3 / 5	64 / 82
3	Hassan Janfeshan (IRI)	2	0	2	2 / 6	64 / 76

Group C

Rank	Athlete	Pts	W	L	Games W/L	Points W/L
1	Ko Hang Yee (HKG)	4	2	0	6 / 1	84 / 65
2	Zhao Ping (CHN)	3	1	1	3 / 3	65 / 56
3	Safwan Shafeeq (IRQ)	2	0	2	1 / 6	51 / 79

Group D

Rank	Athlete	Pts	W	L	Games W/L	Points W/L
1	Jung Young-Il (KOR)	6	3	0	9 / 0	99 / 29
2	Choi Siu Hung (HKG)	5	2	1	6 / 4	88 / 71
3	Yukihiro Sato (JPN)	4	1	2	4 / 6	70 / 86
4	Georgiy Chetverikov (KAZ)	3	0	3	0 / 9	28 / 99

Group E

Rank	Athlete	Pts	W	L	Games W/L	Points W/L
1	Kim Jeong-seok (KOR)	6	3	0	9 / 2	117 / 74
2	Anurak Laowong (THA)	5	2	1	7 / 4	105 / 88
3	Yin Chien Ping (TPE)	4	1	2	5 / 6	98 / 98
4	Law Wai Tong (HKG)	3	0	3	0 / 9	39 / 99

Group F

Rank	Athlete	Pts	W	L	Games W/L	Points W/L
1	Wittaya Wichaiwattana (THA)	6	3	0	9 / 2	123 / 60
2	Wu Cheng Sheng (TPE)	5	2	1	6 / 3	81 / 63
3	Ali Khobizadeh (IRI)	4	1	2	5 / 6	95 / 102
4	Barak Bakr (LIB)	3	0	3	0 / 9	25 / 99

Group G

Rank	Athlete	Pts	W	L	Games W/L	Points W/L
1	Shinichi Yoshida (JPN)	6	3	0	9 / 1	103 / 47
2	Osama Abujame (JOR)	5	2	1	7 / 3	101 / 52
3	Chu Cheng Lao (MAC)	4	1	2	3 / 6	49 / 89
4	Hasan Bumajdad (KUW)	3	0	3	0 / 9	34 / 99

===== Final Round =====
Quarterfinals
Feng Panfeng (CHN)
Bye
Shinichi Yoshida (JPN)	2
Jung Young-Il (KOR)	3
Ko Hang Yee (HKG)	3
Kim Jeong-seok (KOR)	2
Wittaya Wichaiwattana (THA)	0
Kim Young-Gun (KOR)	3

Semifinals
Feng Panfeng (CHN)	3
Jung Young-Il (KOR)	0
Ko Hang Yee (HKG)	2
Kim Young-Gun (KOR)	3

Gold Medal Match
Feng Panfeng (CHN)	3
Kim Young-Gun (KOR)	1
Third place
Jung Young-Il (KOR)	1
Ko Hang Yee (HKG)	3

==== Men's singles TT 4 ====
===== Groups =====
Group A

Rank	Athlete	Pts	W	L	Games W/L	Points W/L
1	Cao Ningning (CHN)	6	3	0	9 / 0	100 / 64
2	Choi Il-Sang (KOR)	5	2	1	6 / 4	99 / 88
3	Adyos Astan (INA)	4	1	2	4 / 6	91 / 93
4	Chau Kam Hung (HKG)	3	0	3	0 / 9	56 / 101

Group B

Rank	Athlete	Pts	W	L	Games W/L	Points W/L
1	Zhang Yan (CHN)	6	3	0	9 / 0	66 / 29
2	Takaaki Utsugi (JPN)	5	2	1	6 / 3	56 / 52
3	Vladimir Kaplich (KAZ)	4	1	2	3 / 6	25 / 66
4	Sonu Gupta (IND)	3	0	0	0 / 0	0 / 0

Group C

Rank	Athlete	Pts	W	L	Games W/L	Points W/L
1	Ko Kun Nan (TPE)	6	3	0	9 / 1	108 / 54
2	Guo Xingyuan (CHN)	5	2	1	6 / 3	88 / 61
3	Hamid Reza Sheikh Zadeh (IRI)	4	1	2	4 / 6	75 / 84
4	Trivendra Singh (IND)	3	0	3	0 / 9	27 / 99

Group D

Rank	Athlete	Pts	W	L	Games W/L	Points W/L
1	Kim Jung-Gil (KOR)	6	3	0	9 / 0	99 / 36
2	Lin Wen Hsin (TPE)	5	2	1	6 / 3	83 / 50
3	Hassan Adnan Al-Sharif (QAT)	4	1	2	3 / 6	54 / 85
4	Abilio de Araujo (TLS)	3	0	3	0 / 9	36 / 101

===== Final Round =====
Semifinals
Cao Ningning (CHN)	3
Ko Kun Nan (TPE)	1
Kim Jung-Gil (KOR)	3
Zhang Yan (CHN)	2

Gold Medal Match
Cao Ningning (CHN)	3
Kim Jung-Gil (KOR)	0
Bronze Medal Match
Ko Kun Nan (TPE)	1
Zhang Yan (CHN)	3

==== Men's singles TT 5 ====
===== Groups =====
Group A

Rank	Athlete	Pts	W	L	Games W/L	Points W/L
1	Kim Byoung-Young (KOR)	4	2	0	6 / 0	66 / 22
2	Lau Chit On (HKG)	3	1	1	3 / 5	64 / 67
3	U Kuai Hong (MAC)	2	0	2	2 / 6	41 / 82

Group B

Rank	Athlete	Pts	W	L	Games W/L	Points W/L
1	Jung Eun-Chang (KOR)	4	2	0	6 / 2	81 / 59
2	Zheng Yan (CHN)	3	1	1	5 / 3	76 / 69
3	Lam Tsan Wing (HKG)	2	0	2	0 / 6	38 / 67

Group C

Rank	Athlete	Pts	W	L	Games W/L	Points W/L
1	Lin Yen Hung (TPE)	4	2	0	6 / 0	33 / 11
2	Chong Kam Lon (MAC)	3	1	1	3 / 3	11 / 33
3	Ali Assiri (KSA)	0	0	0	0 / 6	0 / 0

Group D

Rank	Athlete	Pts	W	L	Games W/L	Points W/L
1	Toshihiko Oka (JPN)	4	2	0	6 / 0	66 / 33
2	Tsang Tit Hung (HKG)	3	1	1	3 / 3	52 / 46
3	Mohammed al-Qahtani (KSA)	2	0	2	0 / 6	27 / 66

Group E

Rank	Athlete	Pts	W	L	Games W/L	Points W/L
1	Bai Gang (CHN)	4	2	0	6 / 0	68 / 38
2	Maitree Kongruang (THA)	3	1	1	3 / 3	57 / 47
3	Ahmad Abou Hachem (LIB)	2	0	2	0 / 6	26 / 66

Group F

Rank	Athlete	Pts	W	L	Games W/L	Points W/L
1	Javad Fouladitarghi (IRI)	6	3	0	9 / 2	126 / 103
2	Jedsada Yodyangdeang (THA)	5	2	1	7 / 4	123 / 109
3	Mudani (INA)	4	1	2	5 / 8	121 / 148
4	Ahmed Enad (IRQ)	3	0	3	2 / 9	112 / 122

===== Final Round =====
Quarterfinals
Kim Byoung-Young (KOR)
Bye
Javad Fouladitarghi (IRI)	3
Toshihiko Oka (JPN)	0
Lin Yen Hung (TPE)	1
Bai Gang (CHN)	3
Bye
Jung Eun-Chang (KOR)

Semifinals
Kim Byoung-Young (KOR)	1
Javad Fouladitarghi (IRI)	3
Bai Gang (CHN)	3
Jung Eun-Chang (KOR)	0

Gold Medal Match
Javad Fouladitarghi (IRI)	1
Bai Gang (CHN)	3
Third place
Kim Byoung-Young (KOR)	3
Jung Eun-Chang (KOR)	1

==== Men's singles TT 6-7 ====
===== Groups =====
Group A

Rank	Athlete	Pts	W	L	Games W/L	Points W/L
1	Yuttana Namsaga (THA)	4	2	0	6 / 1	79 / 55
2	Mu Kaiquan (CHN)	3	1	1	4 / 3	74 / 62
3	Bernardo de Carvalho (TLS)	2	0	2	0 / 6	30 / 66

Group B

Rank	Athlete	Pts	W	L	Games W/L	Points W/L
1	Rungroj Thainiyom (THA)	4	2	0	6 / 0	66 / 22
2	Son Jin-Kwang (KOR)	3	1	1	3 / 4	46 / 70
3	Yasuyuki Hamano (JPN)	2	0	2	1 / 6	50 / 70

Group C

Rank	Athlete	Pts	W	L	Games W/L	Points W/L
1	Chen Chao (CHN)	4	2	0	6 / 1	76 / 32
2	Pawan Kumar Sharma (IND)	3	1	1	4 / 3	55 / 57
3	Husam Al-Jeraifani (KSA)	2	0	2	0 / 6	24 / 66

Group D

Rank	Athlete	Pts	W	L	Games W/L	Points W/L
1	Kazuya Kaneko (JPN)	4	2	0	6 / 2	76 / 58
2	Kim Young-Sung (KOR)	3	1	1	5 / 3	75 / 66
3	Jazaa Al-Shammari (KSA)	2	0	2	0 / 6	40 / 67

Group E

Rank	Athlete	Pts	W	L	Games W/L	Points W/L
1	Liao Keli (CHN)	4	2	0	6 / 0	66 / 29
2	Choy Hing Lam (HKG)	3	1	1	3 / 5	60 / 70
3	Mohd Nazizul Hamzah (MAS)	2	0	2	2 / 6	53 / 80

Group F

Rank	Athlete	Pts	W	L	Games W/L	Points W/L
1	Junki Itai (JPN)	4	2	0	6 / 2	76 / 76
2	Lee Ming Yip (HKG)	3	1	1	4 / 4	79 / 70
3	Engku Ali Engku Ngah (MAS)	2	0	2	2 / 6	75 / 84

===== Final Round =====
Quarterfinals
Yuttana Namsaga (THA)
Bye
Liao Keli (CHN)	3
Kazuya Kaneko (JPN)	0
Chen Chao (CHN)	3
Junki Itai (JPN)	0
Bye
Rungroj Thainiyom (THA)

Semifinals
Yuttana Namsaga (THA)	0
Liao Keli (CHN)	3
Chen Chao (CHN)	0
Rungroj Thainiyom (THA)	3

Gold Medal Match
Liao Keli (CHN)	3
Rungroj Thainiyom (THA)	2
Third place
Yuttana Namsaga (THA)	2
Chen Chao (CHN)	3

==== Men's singles TT 8 ====
===== Groups =====
Group A

Rank	Athlete	Pts	W	L	Games W/L	Points W/L
1	Ye Chaoqun (CHN)	4	2	0	6 / 0	68 / 49
2	Lee Cheon-Sik (KOR)	3	1	1	3 / 5	80 / 74
3	Pham van Hoang (VIE)	2	0	2	2 / 6	61 / 86

Group B

Rank	Athlete	Pts	W	L	Games W/L	Points W/L
1	Sun Churen (CHN)	6	3	0	9 / 1	116 / 65
2	Hu Ming Fu (TPE)	5	2	1	7 / 4	124 / 96
3	Ly Xuan Phu (VIE)	4	1	2	3 / 6	64 / 76
4	Athula Jayasinghage (SRI)	3	0	3	1 / 9	44 / 111

Group C

Rank	Athlete	Pts	W	L	Games W/L	Points W/L
1	Zhao Shuai (CHN)	6	3	0	9 / 0	106 / 55
2	Kim Kwang-jin (KOR)	5	2	1	6 / 3	85 / 54
3	Hou Ting Sung (TPE)	4	1	2	3 / 6	78 / 81
4	Safar Mohammad Ahmadi (AFG)	3	0	3	0 / 9	20 / 99

===== Final Round =====
Quarterfinals
Ye Chaoqun (CHN)
Bye
Hu Ming Fu (TPE)	0
Kim Kwang-jin (KOR)	3
Zhao Shuai (CHN)	3
Lee Cheon-Sik (KOR)	2
Bye
Sun Churen (CHN)

Semifinals
Ye Chaoqun (CHN)	3
Kim Kwang-jin (KOR)	0
Zhao Shuai (CHN)	3
Sun Churen (CHN)	1

Gold Medal Match
Ye Chaoqun (CHN)	1
Zhao Shuai (CHN)	3
Third place
Kim Kwang-jin (KOR)	2
Sun Churen (CHN)	3

==== Men's singles TT 9 ====
===== Groups =====
Group A

Rank	Athlete	Pts	W	L	Games W/L	Points W/L
1	Ma Lin (CHN)	4	2	0	6 / 0	66 / 26
2	Cheung Ping Kwai Samuel (HKG)	3	1	1	3 / 4	56 / 68
3	Huynh Thanh (VIE)	2	0	2	1 / 6	47 / 75

Group B

Rank	Athlete	Pts	W	L	Games W/L	Points W/L
1	Koh Zhi Liang (MAS)	4	2	0	6 / 0	66 / 23
2	Thamer Habshan (KSA)	3	1	1	3 / 3	50 / 43
3	Mustapha Harake (LIB)	2	0	2	0 / 6	16 / 66

Group C

Rank	Athlete	Pts	W	L	Games W/L	Points W/L
1	Han Yajie (CHN)	4	2	0	6 / 0	68 / 37
2	Wong Chi Yin (HKG)	3	1	1	3 / 4	61 / 68
3	Ting Ing Hock (MAS)	2	0	2	1 / 6	48 / 72

Group D

Rank	Athlete	Pts	W	L	Games W/L	Points W/L
1	Zhao Yiqing (CHN)	4	2	0	6 / 0	66 / 26
2	Mai Ngoc Trung (VIE)	3	1	1	3 / 3	48 / 45
3	Chaminda Nawarathna (SRI)	2	0	2	0 / 6	23 / 66

Group E

Rank	Athlete	Pts	W	L	Games W/L	Points W/L
1	Hong Chin Sing (MAS)	4	2	0	6 / 3	91 / 74
2	Toshiyuki Honda (JPN)	3	1	1	4 / 3	64 / 63
3	Lui Hong Ling (HKG)	2	0	2	2 / 6	67 / 85

Group F

Rank	Athlete	Pts	W	L	Games W/L	Points W/L
1	Benedicto Gaela (PHI)	4	2	0	6 / 0	66 / 35
2	Kwon Sang-Kook (KOR)	3	1	1	3 / 3	54 / 50
3	Ranjit Singh Gujjar (IND)	2	0	2	0 / 6	31 / 66

===== Final Round =====
Quarterfinals
Ma Lin (CHN)
Bye
Hong Chin Sing (MAS)	1
Han Yajie (CHN)	3
Zhao Yiqing (CHN)	3
Benedicto Gaela (PHI)	1
Bye
Koh Zhi Liang (MAS)

Semifinals
Ma Lin (CHN)	3
Han Yajie (CHN)	1
Zhao Yiqing (CHN)	3
Koh Zhi Liang (MAS)	0

Gold Medal Match
Ma Lin (CHN)	3
Zhao Yiqing (CHN)	0
Third place
Han Yajie (CHN)	3
Koh Zhi Liang (MAS)	1

==== Men's singles TT 10 ====
===== Groups =====
Group A

Rank	Athlete	Pts	W	L	Games W/L	Points W/L
1	Ge Yang (CHN)	4	2	0	6 / 0	66 / 28
2	Naseem Hamad (IRQ)	3	1	1	3 / 4	55 / 67
3	Lu Weichen (TPE)	2	0	2	1 / 6	48 / 74

Group B

Rank	Athlete	Pts	W	L	Games W/L	Points W/L
1	Lian Hao (CHN)	6	3	0	9 / 2	112 / 70
2	David Jacobs (INA)	5	2	1	7 / 4	109 / 84
3	Ju Ren der (TPE)	4	1	2	5 / 6	97 / 91
4	Hotam Teshaev (TJK)	3	0	3	0 / 9	26 / 99

Group C

Rank	Athlete	Pts	W	L	Games W/L	Points W/L
1	Hu Erguang (CHN)	6	3	0	9 / 2	115 / 80
2	Mohamad Azwar Bakar (MAS)	5	2	1	8 / 3	108 / 73
3	Lee Yao Tang (TPE)	4	1	2	3 / 6	74 / 78
4	Jayarathna Rathanayake (SRI)	3	0	3	0 / 9	33 / 99

===== Final Round =====
Quarterfinals
Ge Yang (CHN)
Bye
David Jacobs (INA)	3
Hu Erguang (CHN)	1
Mohamad Azwar Bakar (MAS)	3
Naseem Hamad (IRQ)	2
Bye
Lian Hao (CHN)

Semifinals
Ge Yang (CHN)	3
David Jacobs (INA)	2
Mohamad Azwar Bakar (MAS)	0
Lian Hao (CHN)	3

Gold Medal Match
Ge Yang (CHN)	3
Lian Hao (CHN)	2
Third place
David Jacobs (INA)	3
Mohamad Azwar Bakar (MAS)	0

==== Men's Team TT 1-3 ====
===== Groups =====
Group A

Rank	Athlete	Pts	W	L	Games W/L	Points W/L
1	South Korea (KOR)	4	2	0	13 / 4	178 / 119
2	Thailand (THA)	3	1	1	8 / 8	139 / 154
3	Iran (IRI)	2	0	2	3 / 12	111 / 155

Group B

Rank	Athlete	Pts	W	L	Games W/L	Points W/L
1	China (CHN)	4	2	0	12 / 0	134 / 55
2	Japan (JPN)	3	1	1	6 / 6	93 / 86
3	Kuwait (KUW)	2	0	2	0 / 6	48 / 134

Group C

Rank	Athlete	Pts	W	L	Games W/L	Points W/L
1	Hong Kong (HKG)	4	2	0	12 / 3	150 / 98
2	Chinese Taipei (TPE)	3	1	1	9 / 6	141 / 116
3	Lebanon (LIB)	2	0	2	0 / 12	55 / 132

===== Final Round =====
Quarterfinals
South Korea (KOR)
Bye
Japan (JPN)	3
Hong Kong (HKG)	2
Chinese Taipei (TPE)	0
Thailand (THA)	3
Bye
China (CHN)

Semifinals
South Korea (KOR)	3
Japan (JPN)	2
Thailand (THA)	0
China (CHN)	3

Gold Medal Match
South Korea (KOR)	2
China (CHN)	3
Third place
Japan (JPN)	2
Thailand (THA)	3

==== Men's Team TT 4-5 ====
===== Groups =====
Group A

Rank	Athlete	Pts	W	L	Games W/L	Points W/L
1	South Korea (KOR)	4	2	0	12 / 0	132 / 63
2	Indonesia (INA)	3	1	1	6 / 7	112 / 114
3	Hong Kong (HKG)	2	0	2	1 / 12	76 / 143

Group B

Rank	Athlete	Pts	W	L	Games W/L	Points W/L
1	China (CHN)	6	3	0	12 / 1	144 / 67
2	Thailand (THA)	5	2	1	7 / 6	117 / 100
3	Macau (MAC)	4	1	2	0 / 12	38 / 132
4	India (IND) (w/o)	0	0	3	0 / 0	0 / 0

Group C

Rank	Athlete	Pts	W	L	Games W/L	Points W/L
1	Chinese Taipei (TPE)	6	3	0	18 / 1	207 / 115
2	Iran (IRI)	5	2	1	14 / 11	216 / 201
3	Japan (JPN)	4	1	2	11 / 13	218 / 188
4	Saudi Arabia (KSA)	3	0	3	0 / 18	61 / 198

===== Final Round =====
Quarterfinals
South Korea (KOR)
Bye
Thailand (THA)	0
Iran (IRI)	3
Chinese Taipei (TPE)	3
Indonesia (INA)	1
Bye
China (CHN)

Semifinals
South Korea (KOR)	3
Iran (IRI)	1
Chinese Taipei (TPE)	0
China (CHN)	3

Gold Medal Match
South Korea (KOR)	3
China (CHN)	1
Third place
Iran (IRI)	0
Chinese Taipei (TPE)	3

=== Women ===
==== Women's singles TT 1-3 ====
===== Groups =====
Group A

Rank	Athlete	Pts	W	L	Games W/L	Points W/L
1	Li Qian (CHN)	6	3	0	9 / 0	99 / 35
2	Forough Bakhtiary (IRI)	5	2	1	6 / 4	85 / 73
3	Chan Siu Ching (HKG)	4	1	2	4 / 6	77 / 81
4	Shilpi Rani Nath (BAN)	3	0	3	0 / 9	27 / 99

Group B

Rank	Athlete	Pts	W	L	Games W/L	Points W/L
1	Jung Sang-Sook (KOR)	6	3	0	9 / 1	109 / 50
2	Elham Chazanisharahi (IRI)	5	2	1	6 / 3	77 / 62
3	Sonalben Manubhai Patel (IND)	4	1	2	4 / 6	80 / 96
4	Galiya Bespalaya (KAZ)	3	0	3	0 / 9	41 / 99

Group C

Rank	Athlete	Pts	W	L	Games W/L	Points W/L
1	Liu Jing (CHN)	6	3	0	9 / 1	108 / 62
2	Choi Hyun-Ja (KOR)	5	2	1	7 / 3	99 / 82
3	Wachirapond Maenpuak (THA)	4	1	2	3 / 8	82 / 110
4	Osrita Muslim (INA)	3	0	3	2 / 9	78 / 113

Group D

Rank	Athlete	Pts	W	L	Games W/L	Points W/L
1	Maha Bargouthi (JOR)	6	3	0	9 / 3	128 / 91
2	Pattaravadee Wararitdamrongkul (THA)	5	2	1	8 / 5	123 / 114
3	Kim Sun-ja (KOR)	4	1	2	6 / 6	112 / 107
4	Ng Choi Ha Josephine (HKG)	3	0	3	0 / 9	49 / 100

===== Final Round =====
Semifinals
Li Qian (CHN)	3
Maha Bargouthi (JOR)	0
Liu Jing (CHN)	3
Jung Sang-Sook (KOR)	1

Gold Medal Match
Li Qian (CHN)	3
Liu Jing (CHN)	0
Bronze Medal Match
Maha Bargouthi (JOR)	1
Jung Sang-Sook (KOR)	3

==== Women's singles TT 4 ====
===== Groups =====
Group A

Rank	Athlete	Pts	W	L	Games W/L	Points W/L
1	Zhou Ying (CHN)	4	2	0	6 / 0	33 / 8
2	Viktoriya Kuznetsova (KAZ)	3	1	1	3 / 3	8 / 33
3	Bhavinaben Patel (IND)	0	0	0	0 / 6	0 / 0

Group B

Rank	Athlete	Pts	W	L	Games W/L	Points W/L
1	Moon Sung-Hye (KOR)	4	2	0	6 / 0	66 / 27
2	Faten Eleimat (JOR)	3	1	1	3 / 3	52 / 40
3	Minu Akter (BAN)	2	0	2	0 / 6	15 / 66

Group C

Rank	Athlete	Pts	W	L	Games W/L	Points W/L
1	Lee Ya Chu (TPE)	6	3	0	9 / 2	121 / 83
2	Tarsilem (INA)	5	2	1	7 / 5	129 / 110
3	Fatemah Al-Azzam (JOR)	4	1	2	6 / 6	121 / 115
4	Ramilaben Naranbhai Chauhan (IND)	3	0	3	0 / 9	36 / 99

Group D

Rank	Athlete	Pts	W	L	Games W/L	Points W/L
1	Zhang Miao (CHN)	4	2	0	6 / 3	91 / 77
2	Jung Ji-Nam (KOR)	3	1	1	5 / 5	95 / 90
3	Lu Pi Chun (TPE)	2	0	2	3 / 6	74 / 93

===== Final Round =====
Semifinals
Zhou Ying (CHN)	3
Lee Ya Chu (TPE)	1
Zhang Miao (CHN)	2
Moon Sung-Hye (KOR)	3

Gold Medal Match
Zhou Ying (CHN)	3
Moon Sung-Hye (KOR)	1
Bronze Medal Match
Lee Ya Chu (TPE)	0
Zhang Miao (CHN)	3

==== Women's singles TT 5 ====
===== Groups =====
Group A

Rank	Athlete	Pts	W	L	Games W/L	Points W/L
1	Gu Gai (CHN)	6	3	0	9 / 0	99 / 42
2	Wong Pui Yi (HKG)	5	2	1	6 / 5	110 / 85
3	Kim Young-Soon (KOR)	4	1	2	5 / 6	68 / 91
4	Zaytuna Rozikova (TJK)	2	0	2	0 / 9	7 / 66

Group B

Rank	Athlete	Pts	W	L	Games W/L	Points W/L
1	Zhang Bian (CHN)	6	3	0	9 / 0	99 / 35
2	Khetam Abuawad (JOR)	5	2	1	6 / 4	90 / 80
3	Wei Mei Hui (TPE)	4	1	2	4 / 6	91 / 101
4	Suhair Igzar (IRQ)	3	0	3	0 / 9	38 / 102

Group C

Rank	Athlete	Pts	W	L	Games W/L	Points W/L
1	Ren Guixiang (CHN)	6	3	0	9 / 0	99 / 44
2	Kimie Bessho (JPN)	5	2	1	6 / 6	110 / 102
3	Chan Siu Ling (HKG)	4	1	2	4 / 7	92 / 108
4	Jung Young-A (KOR)	3	0	3	3 / 9	77 / 124

===== Final Round =====
Quarterfinals
Gu Gai (CHN)
Bye
Khetam Abuawad (JOR)	3
Kimie Bessho (JPN)	1
Ren Guixiang (CHN)	3
Wong Pui Yi (HKG)	0
Bye
Zhang Bian (CHN)

Semifinals
Gu Gai (CHN)	3
Khetam Abuawad (JOR)	1
Ren Guixiang (CHN)	3
Zhang Bian (CHN)	0

Gold Medal Match
Gu Gai (CHN)	3
Ren Guixiang (CHN)	2
Third place
Khetam Abuawad (JOR)	0
Zhang Bian (CHN)	3

==== Women's singles TT 6-8 ====
===== Groups =====
Group A

Rank	Athlete	Pts	W	L	Games W/L	Points W/L
1	Mao Jingdian (CHN)	6	3	0	9 / 0	99 / 37
2	Kim Mi-Soon (KOR)	5	2	1	6 / 5	100 / 88
3	Zhu Ying (CHN)	4	1	2	5 / 6	88 / 91
4	Marina Darvina (KAZ)	3	0	3	0 / 9	28 / 99

Group B

Rank	Athlete	Pts	W	L	Games W/L	Points W/L
1	Josephine Medina (PHI)	4	2	0	6 / 0	66 / 26
2	Jiang Shan (CHN)	3	1	1	3 / 3	48 / 48
3	Abelita Borges (TLS)	2	0	2	0 / 6	26 / 66

===== Final Round =====
Semifinals
Mao Jingdian (CHN)	3
Jiang Shan (CHN)	0
Kim Mi-Soon (KOR)	0
Josephine Medina (PHI)	3

Gold Medal Match
Mao Jingdian (CHN)	3
Josephine Medina (PHI)	0
Bronze Medal Match
Jiang Shan (CHN)	3
Kim Mi-Soon (KOR)	1

==== Women's singles TT 9 ====
Rank	Athlete	Pts	W	L	Games W/L	Points W/L
1st place, gold medalist(s)	Liu Meili (CHN)	4	2	0	6 / 0	66 / 38
2nd place, silver medalist(s)	Liu Meng (CHN)	3	1	1	3 / 3	53 / 56
3	Yu Hailian (CHN)	2	0	2	0 / 6	41 / 66

==== Women's singles TT 10 ====
===== Groups =====
Group A

Rank	Athlete	Pts	W	L	Games W/L	Points W/L
1	Yang Qian (CHN)	4	2	0	6 / 0	66 / 32
2	Narges Hamidi (IRI)	3	1	1	3 / 3	51 / 61
3	Viet Thi Kim van (VIE)	2	0	2	0 / 6	45 / 69

Group B

Rank	Athlete	Pts	W	L	Games W/L	Points W/L
1	Kim Kun-Hea (KOR)	6	3	0	9 / 1	111 / 48
2	Zhou Difen (CHN)	5	2	1	6 / 3	91 / 72
3	Nguyen Thi Hoa Phuong (VIE)	4	1	2	4 / 6	71 / 100
4	Minnie de Ramos (PHI)	3	0	3	0 / 9	47 / 100

Group C

Rank	Athlete	Pts	W	L	Games W/L	Points W/L
1	Liu Xu (CHN)	6	3	0	9 / 1	108 / 47
2	Somayeh Mostafavighahfarokhi (IRI)	5	2	1	6 / 3	80 / 70
3	Lee Wol-Soon (KOR)	4	1	2	4 / 6	85 / 86
4	Jaquelina da Costa (TLS)	3	0	3	0 / 9	29 / 99

===== Final Round =====
Quarterfinals
Yang Qian (CHN)
Bye
Zhou Difen (CHN)	3
Somayeh Mostafavighahfarokhi (IRI)	0
Liu Xu (CHN)	3
Narges Hamidi (IRI)	0
Bye
Kim Kun-Hea (KOR)

Semifinals
Yang Qian (CHN)	3
Zhou Difen (CHN)	0
Liu Xu (CHN)	3
Kim Kun-Hea (KOR)	1

Gold Medal Match
Yang Qian (CHN)	3
Liu Xu (CHN)	0
Third place
Zhou Difen (CHN)	1
Kim Kun-Hea (KOR)	3

== See also ==
- Asian Para Games - Table tennis
