= Jung Eun-chang =

South Korean para table tennis player

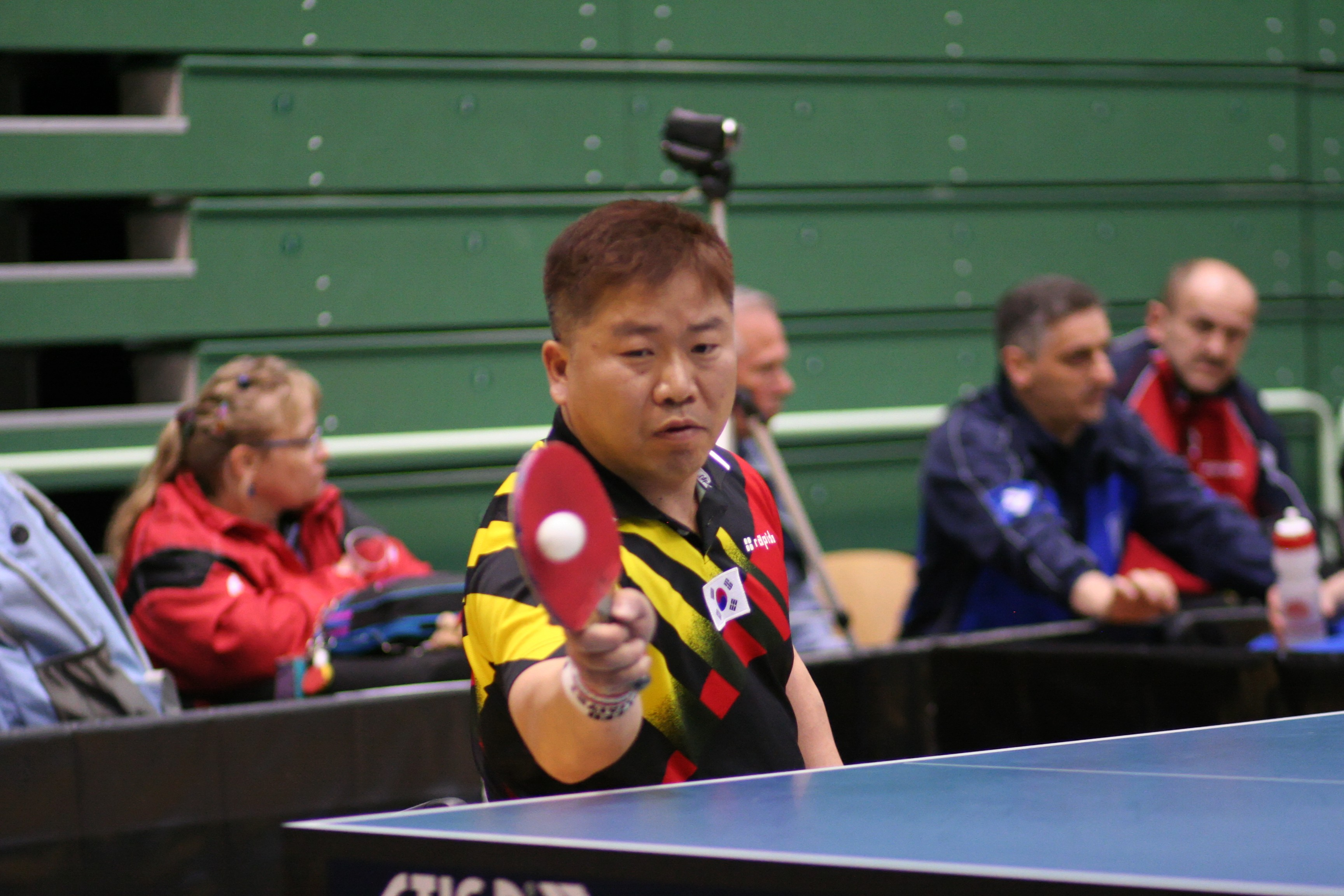
- Jung in 2008

Personal information
- Born: August 17, 1969 (age 56) South Korea

Sport
- Sport: Table tennis
- Playing style: Right-handed shakehand grip
- Disability class: 5
- Highest ranking: 2 (April 2005)
Medal record
Men's para table tennis
Representing South Korea
Paralympic Games
Gold medal – first place	2000 Sydney	Teams C5
Gold medal – first place	2008 Beijing	Teams C4–5
Silver medal – second place	2004 Athens	Singles C5
Silver medal – second place	2004 Athens	Teams C5
Silver medal – second place	2008 Beijing	Singles C4–5
Silver medal – second place	2012 London	Teams C4–5
Bronze medal – third place	2012 London	Singles C5
World Championships
Gold medal – first place	2010 Gwangju	Singles C5
Gold medal – first place	2010 Gwangju	Teams C5
Bronze medal – third place	2002 Taipei	Teams C5
Asian Para Games
Gold medal – first place	2010 Guangzhou	Teams C4–5
FESPIC Games
Gold medal – first place	2002 Busan	Teams C5
Gold medal – first place	2006 Kuala Lumpur	Teams C5
Silver medal – second place	2002 Busan	Singles C5
Silver medal – second place	2006 Kuala Lumpur	Singles C5
Bronze medal – third place	2002 Busan	Open singles in wheelchair
Asia and Oceania Championships
Gold medal – first place	2011 Hong Kong	Teams C5
Bronze medal – third place	2007 Seoul	Teams C5
FESPIC Championships
Gold medal – first place	1997 Hong Kong	Singles C5
Gold medal – first place	1999 Taipei	Singles C5
Gold medal – first place	1999 Taipei	Doubles C1–5
Gold medal – first place	2001 Osaka	Teams C5
Gold medal – first place	2003 Shanghai	Teams C5
Silver medal – second place	1999 Taipei	Teams C5
Bronze medal – third place	2003 Shanghai	Singles C5

- Jung Eun-chang
- Hangul: 정은창
- RR: Jeong Eunchang
- MR: Chŏng Ŭnch'ang

Jung Eun-chang (Korean: 정은창, born 17 August 1969) is a South Korean retired para table tennis player. He won seven medals, including two golds, in four Paralympic Games from 2000 to 2012.

He suffered a debilitating back injury during required military service in 1991. He started playing table tennis in 1992.
