= Bai Gang =

Chinese para table tennis player

Personal information
- Born: March 20, 1961 (age 65) Xi'an, Shaanxi, China

Sport
- Sport: Table tennis
- Playing style: Right-handed shakehand grip
- Disability class: 5
- Highest ranking: 3 (January 2008)
Medal record
Men's para table tennis
Representing China
Paralympic Games
Silver medal – second place	2008 Beijing	Teams C4–5
Asian Para Games
Gold medal – first place	2010 Guangzhou	Singles C5
Silver medal – second place	2010 Guangzhou	Teams C4–5
FESPIC Games
Silver medal – second place	2006 Kuala Lumpur	Teams C5
Bronze medal – third place	2006 Kuala Lumpur	Singles C5
Asia and Oceania Championships
Gold medal – first place	2005 Kuala Lumpur	Singles C5
Gold medal – first place	2007 Seoul	Singles C5
Gold medal – first place	2007 Seoul	Teams C4–5
Bronze medal – third place	2005 Kuala Lumpur	Teams C5
FESPIC Championships
Bronze medal – third place	2003 Shanghai	Teams C5

Bai Gang
- Traditional Chinese: 白剛
- Simplified Chinese: 白刚
Transcriptions
Standard Mandarin
- Hanyu Pinyin: Bái Gāng

Bai Gang (Chinese: 白刚, born 20 March 1961) is a Chinese retired para table tennis player. He won a silver medal at the 2008 Summer Paralympics.

He is a polio survivor. He began his para table tennis career when he was 39.
