= Kim Byoung-young =

South Korean para table tennis player

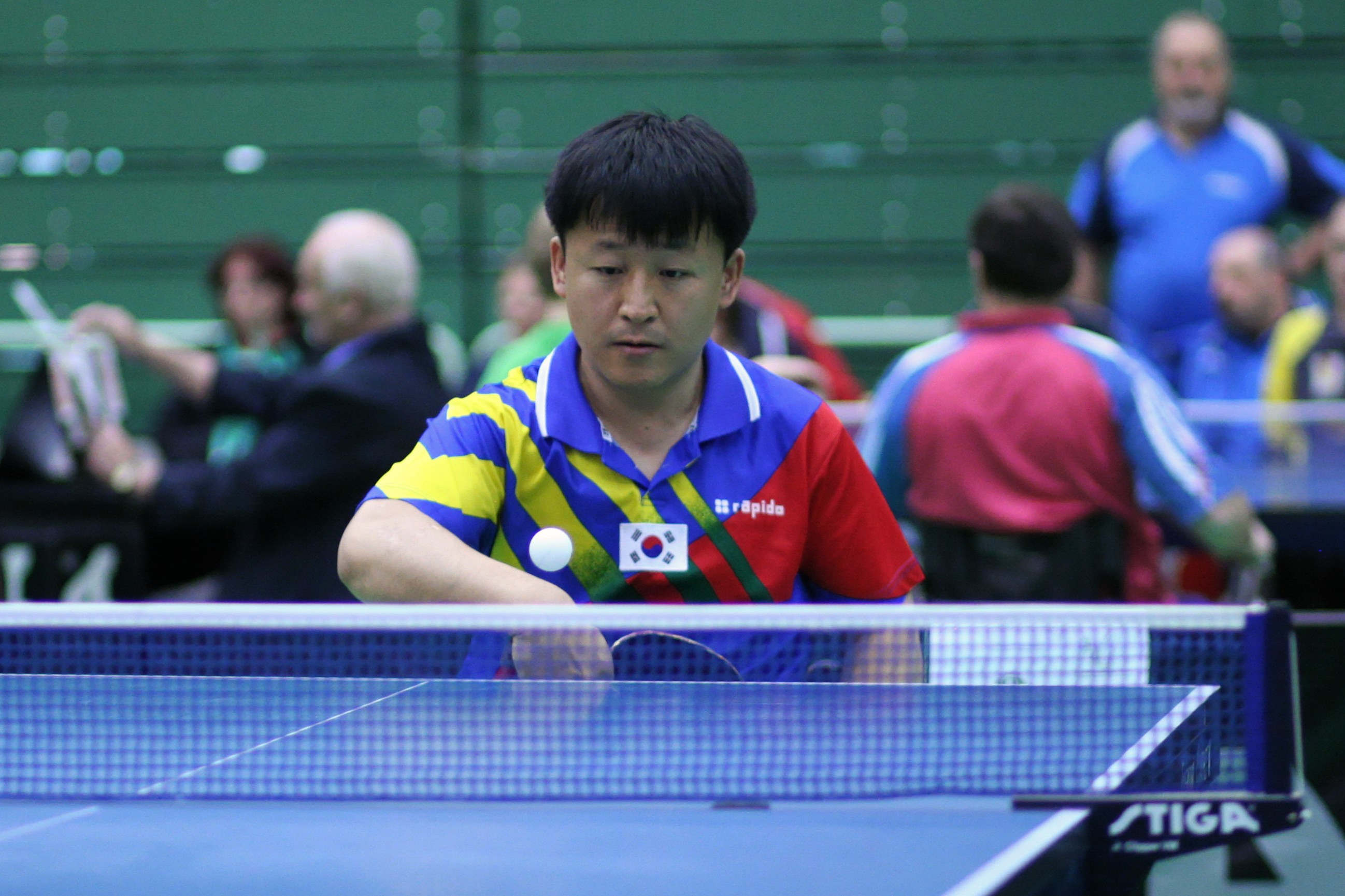
- Kim in 2008

Personal information
- Born: March 9, 1969 (age 57) Ulsan, South Korea

Sport
- Sport: Table tennis
- Playing style: Right-handed shakehand grip
- Disability class: 5
- Highest ranking: 1 (October 2004)
Medal record
Men's para table tennis
Representing South Korea
Paralympic Games
Gold medal – first place	2000 Sydney	Teams C5
Gold medal – first place	2004 Athens	Singles C5
Gold medal – first place	2008 Beijing	Teams C4–5
Silver medal – second place	2004 Athens	Teams C5
World Championships
Gold medal – first place	2010 Gwangju	Teams C5
Silver medal – second place	2006 Montreux	Singles C5
Bronze medal – third place	2002 Taipei	Open singles in wheelchair
Bronze medal – third place	2002 Taipei	Teams C5
Bronze medal – third place	2010 Gwangju	Singles C5
Asian Para Games
Gold medal – first place	2010 Guangzhou	Teams C4–5
Bronze medal – third place	2010 Guangzhou	Singles C5
FESPIC Games
Gold medal – first place	2002 Busan	Singles C5
Gold medal – first place	2002 Busan	Open singles in wheelchair
Gold medal – first place	2002 Busan	Teams C5
Gold medal – first place	2006 Kuala Lumpur	Singles C5
Gold medal – first place	2006 Kuala Lumpur	Open singles standing
Gold medal – first place	2006 Kuala Lumpur	Teams C5
Asian and Oceanic Championships
Gold medal – first place	2009 Amman	Singles C5
Gold medal – first place	2011 Hong Kong	Teams C5
Silver medal – second place	2009 Amman	Open singles in wheelchair
Bronze medal – third place	2007 Seoul	Singles C4–5
Bronze medal – third place	2007 Seoul	Teams C5
Bronze medal – third place	2011 Hong Kong	Singles C5
FESPIC Championships
Gold medal – first place	1999 Taipei	Doubles C1–5
Gold medal – first place	2001 Osaka	Singles C5
Gold medal – first place	2001 Osaka	Open singles in wheelchair
Gold medal – first place	2001 Osaka	Teams C5
Gold medal – first place	2003 Shanghai	Teams C5
Silver medal – second place	1999 Taipei	Teams C5
Silver medal – second place	2003 Shanghai	Singles C5
Bronze medal – third place	1997 Hong Kong	Singles C5
Bronze medal – third place	1999 Taipei	Singles C5

Korean name
- Hangul: 김병영
- RR: Gim Byeongyeong
- MR: Kim Pyŏngyŏng

Kim Byoung-young (Korean: 김병영; born 9 March 1969) is a South Korean para table tennis coach and former player. He took a gold medal at three consecutive Paralympic Games: 2000, 2004, and 2008, in addition to a silver medal in 2004.

He became disabled in a car accident in 1989, during his compulsory military service. He began playing table tennis in 1992. He has been coaching since his retirement.
