= Oceania Para Table Tennis Championships =

Oceania Para Table Tennis Championships is a biennial sports event for para table tennis players who represent an Oceanian country. It debuted in 2011 after Asia and Oceania Para Table Tennis Championships separated.

== Locations ==
Edition	Year	Host	Dates	Competitors	Countries	Top medalists	Ref
1	2013	(Australia) Canberra	9–16 November	28	4	Australia	
2	2015	(Australia) Bendigo	6–13 April	22	5	Australia	
3	2017	(Fiji) Suva	13–16 April	46	10	Australia	
4	2019	(Australia) Darwin	1–4 May	28	5	Australia	
5	2023	(Solomon Islands) Honiara	17–20 November	51	12	Australia	
6	2025	(New Zealand) Auckland	26–28 September	48	8	Australia	

== All-time medal count ==
As of 2025 (includes medals awarded in the Asia and Oceania Para Table Tennis Championships).

Rank	Nation	Gold	Silver	Bronze	Total
1	Australia (AUS)	36	24	25	85
2	New Zealand (NZL)	2	6	17	25
3	Fiji (FIJ)	1	7	8	16
4	Tuvalu (TUV)	1	0	2	3
5	French Polynesia (TAH)	0	2	2	4
5	Solomon Islands (SOL)	0	2	2	4
7	New Caledonia (NCL)	0	1	2	3
8	Papua New Guinea (PNG)	0	1	0	1
9	Tonga (TGA)	0	0	3	3
Totals (9 entries)		40	43	61	144

== See also ==
- Oceania Table Tennis Championships
