= Andrej Mészáros =

Slovak para table tennis player

Personal information
- Nickname: Bandi
- Born: 7 September 1975 (age 50) Dunajská Streda, Czechoslovakia
- Height: 1.83 m (6 ft 0 in)

Sport
- Country: Slovakia
- Sport: Para table tennis
- Disability class: C4
Medal record
Para table tennis
Representing Slovakia
World Team Championships
Bronze medal – third place	2017 Bratislava	Teams C4
European Championships
Bronze medal – third place	2011 Split	Teams C4
Bronze medal – third place	2013 Lignano	Teams C4

Andrej Mészáros (born 7 September 1975) is a Slovak para table tennis player who competes at international table tennis competitions. He is a two-time European bronze medalist and World bronze medalist in the team events with Peter Mihálik. He has also competed at the 2008 and 2012 Summer Paralympics.
