= Tommy Urhaug =

Norwegian para table tennis player

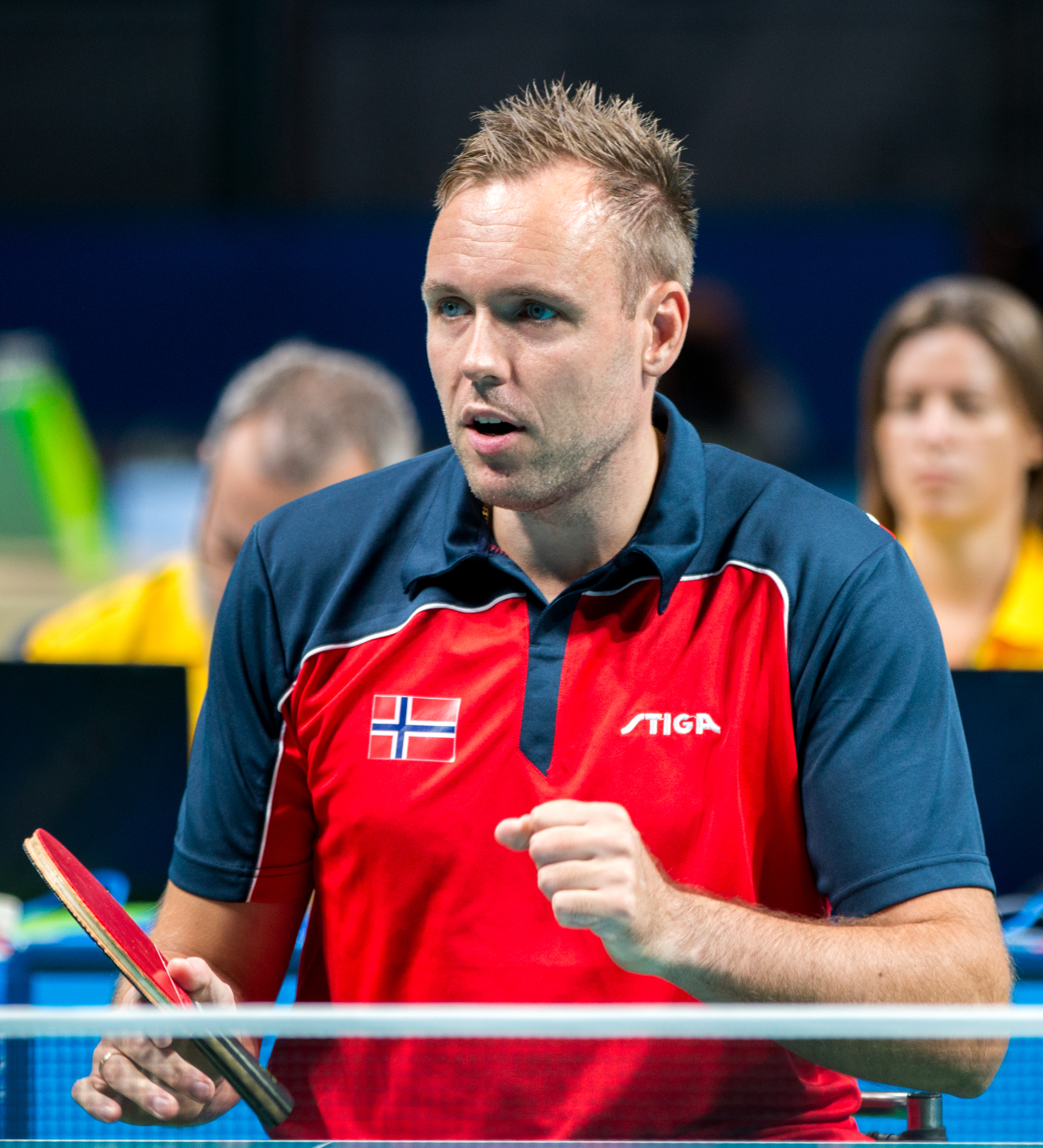
- Urhaug in 2016

Personal information
- Nickname: Turhaug
- Born: 16 June 1980 (age 46) Bergen, Norway
- Height: 175 cm (5 ft 9 in)

Sport
- Country: Norway
- Sport: Para table tennis
- Disability class: C5
- Club: Stord Bordtennisklubb
- Coached by: Jan Bergersen
Medal record
Para table tennis
Representing Norway
Paralympic Games
Gold medal – first place	2024 Paris	Singles class 5
Gold medal – first place	2012 London	Singles class 5
Bronze medal – third place	2008 Beijing	Singles class 4-5
World Championships
Gold medal – first place	2002 Taipei	Singles class 5
Gold medal – first place	2002 Taipei	Teams class 5
Gold medal – first place	2006 Montreux	Open singles standing
Gold medal – first place	2006 Montreux	Teams class 5
Silver medal – second place	2010 Gwangju	Singles class 5
Bronze medal – third place	2006 Montreux	Singles class 5
Bronze medal – third place	2014 Beijing	Singles class 5
Bronze medal – third place	2018 Laško	Singles class 5
European Championships
Gold medal – first place	1999 Piešťany	Singles class 5
Gold medal – first place	1999 Piešťany	Teams class 5
Gold medal – first place	2001 Frankfurt	Open singles
Gold medal – first place	2003 Zagreb	Singles class 5
Gold medal – first place	2005 Jesolo	Open singles standing
Gold medal – first place	2005 Jesolo	Singles class 5
Gold medal – first place	2007 Kranjska Gora	Singles class 4-5
Gold medal – first place	2013 Lignano	Singles class 5
Gold medal – first place	2015 Vejle	Singles class 5
Silver medal – second place	2003 Zagreb	Open singles standing
Silver medal – second place	2003 Zagreb	Teams class 5
Silver medal – second place	2007 Kranjska Gora	Teams class 5
Silver medal – second place	2011 Split	Singles class 5
Bronze medal – third place	2001 Frankfurt	Singles class 5
Bronze medal – third place	2017 Laško	Singles class 5
Bronze medal – third place	2019 Helsingborg	Singles class 5
Bronze medal – third place	2019 Helsingborg	Teams class 5

Tommy Urhaug (born 16 June 1980) is a Norwegian Paralympic para table tennis player. He is a two-time Paralympic champion and won the gold medal in the men's singles class 5 table tennis event at the 2012 Summer Paralympics and the 2024 Summer Paralympics. Urhaug is also a Paralympics bronze medallist, four-time world champion and nine-time European champion, with both individual and team titles. He is a seven-time Paralympian and made his Paralympics debut at the 2000 Summer Paralympics.
