= Peter Mihálik =

Slovak para table tennis player

Personal information
- Born: 30 September 1976 (age 49) Skalica, Czechoslovakia
- Height: 176 cm (5 ft 9 in)

Sport
- Country: Slovakia
- Sport: Para table tennis
- Disability: Paraplegia
- Disability class: C4
- Club: ŠK Žarnovica
- Coached by: Ľuboš Dobrotka
Medal record
Para table tennis
Representing Slovakia
Paralympic Games
Bronze medal – third place	2020 Tokyo	Teams C4-5
European Championships
Silver medal – second place	2009 Genoa	Singles C4
Bronze medal – third place	2011 Split	Teams C4
Bronze medal – third place	2013 Lignano	Singles C4
Bronze medal – third place	2013 Lignano	Teams C4

Peter Mihálik (born 30 September 1976) is a Slovak para table tennis player who competes in international table tennis competitions. He is a Paralympic bronze medalist and a four-time European medalist.

Mihálik was a footballer who played in the Czech league at FK Chmel Blšany and was trained by Miroslav Beránek. In July 2001, he became a paraplegic after being involved in a car accident, he had only signed a contract with FK Senica a month earlier.
