= Lin Yen-hung =

Taiwanese para table tennis player

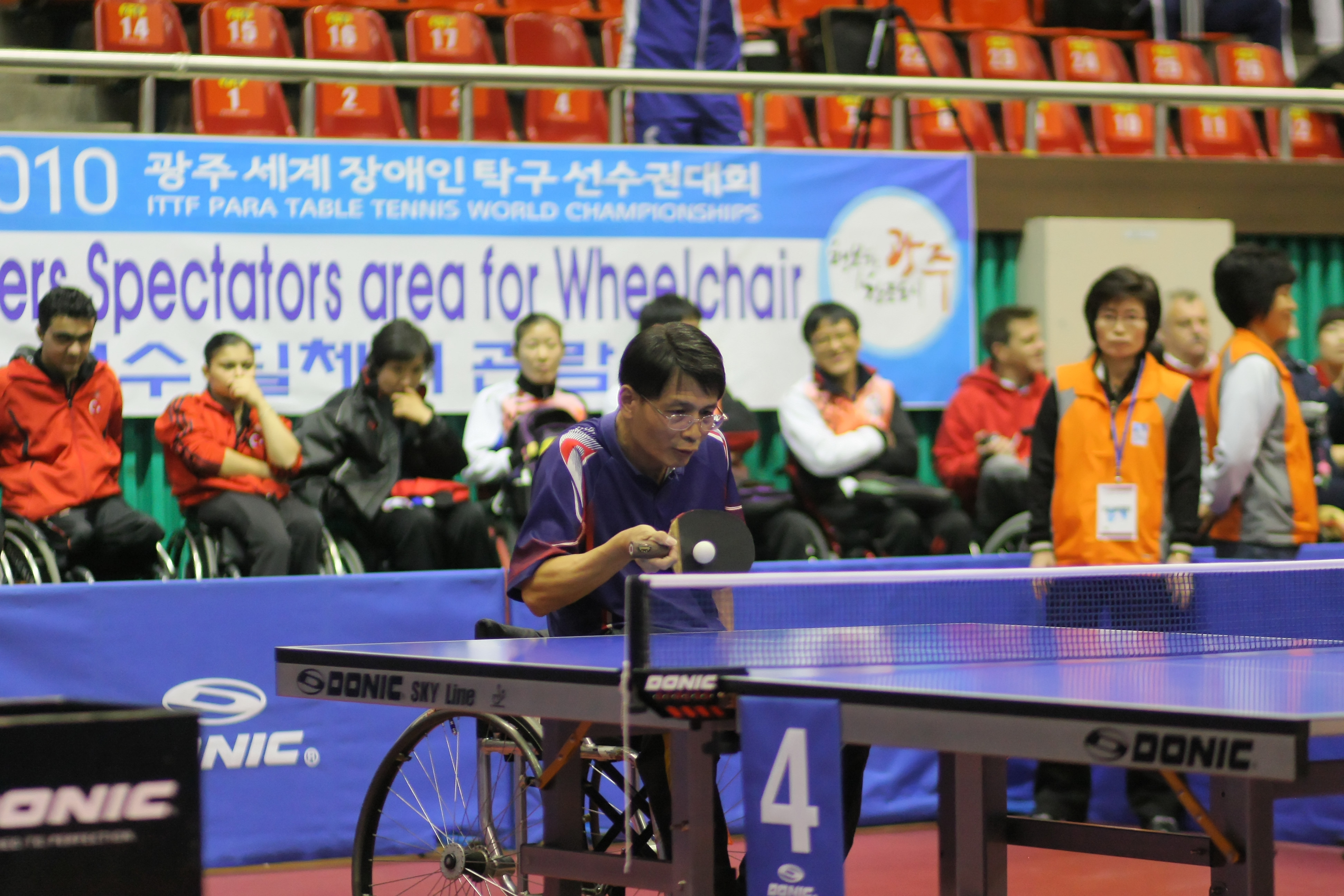
- Lin at the 2010 World Para Table Tennis Championships

Personal information
- Born: 5 March 1958 (age 68) Yunlin County, Taiwan
- Height: 168 cm (5 ft 6 in)
- Weight: 60 kg (132 lb)

Sport
- Sport: Table tennis
- Playing style: Right-handed penhold
- Disability class: 5
- Highest ranking: 3 (December 2013)
- Current ranking: 17 (February 2020)
Medal record
Men's para table tennis
Representing Chinese Taipei
Paralympic Games
Silver medal – second place	2000 Sydney	Teams C5
Silver medal – second place	2016 Rio de Janeiro	Teams C4–5
World Championships
Gold medal – first place	2017 Bratislava	Teams C5
Silver medal – second place	2002 Taipei	Singles C5
Silver medal – second place	2006 Montreux	Teams C5
Bronze medal – third place	1998 Paris	Teams C5
Asian Para Games
Bronze medal – third place	2010 Guangzhou	Teams C4–5
Bronze medal – third place	2014 Incheon	Singles C5
Bronze medal – third place	2014 Incheon	Teams C5
Bronze medal – third place	2018 Jakarta	Singles C5
Bronze medal – third place	2018 Jakarta	Teams C4–5
FESPIC Games
Gold medal – first place	1999 Bangkok	Open singles in wheelchair
Gold medal – first place	1999 Bangkok	Singles C5
Gold medal – first place	1999 Bangkok	Teams C5
Silver medal – second place	2002 Busan	Teams C5
Bronze medal – third place	2002 Busan	Singles C5
Bronze medal – third place	2006 Kuala Lumpur	Teams C5
Asian Championships
Gold medal – first place	2005 Kuala Lumpur	Teams C5
Silver medal – second place	2005 Kuala Lumpur	Open singles standing
Silver medal – second place	2005 Kuala Lumpur	Singles C5
Silver medal – second place	2007 Seoul	Teams C5
Silver medal – second place	2009 Amman	Singles C5
Bronze medal – third place	2013 Beijing	Singles C5
Bronze medal – third place	2013 Beijing	Teams C5
Bronze medal – third place	2015 Amman	Singles C5
Bronze medal – third place	2015 Amman	Teams C5
Bronze medal – third place	2019 Taichung	Teams C5
FESPIC Championships
Gold medal – first place	1999 Taipei	Teams C5
Gold medal – first place	2003 Shanghai	Singles C5
Silver medal – second place	1997 Hong Kong	Singles C5
Silver medal – second place	1999 Taipei	Singles C5
Silver medal – second place	1999 Taipei	Doubles C1–5
Silver medal – second place	2001 Osaka	Singles C5
Silver medal – second place	2001 Osaka	Teams C5
Silver medal – second place	2003 Shanghai	Teams C5
Bronze medal – third place	1997 Hong Kong	Open singles in wheelchair

Lin Yen-hung
- Chinese: 林晏弘
Transcriptions
Standard Mandarin
- Hanyu Pinyin: Lín Yànhóng
- Wade–Giles: Lin^{2} Yen^{4}-hung^{2}

Lin Yen-hung (Chinese: 林晏弘, born 5 March 1958) is a Taiwanese para table tennis player. He won a silver medal at the 2000 Summer Paralympics, and another silver at the 2016 Summer Paralympics at age 58.

He contracted polio when he was a child. He began playing table tennis in 1975.
