= Ernst Bolldén =

Swedish Paralympic table tennis player

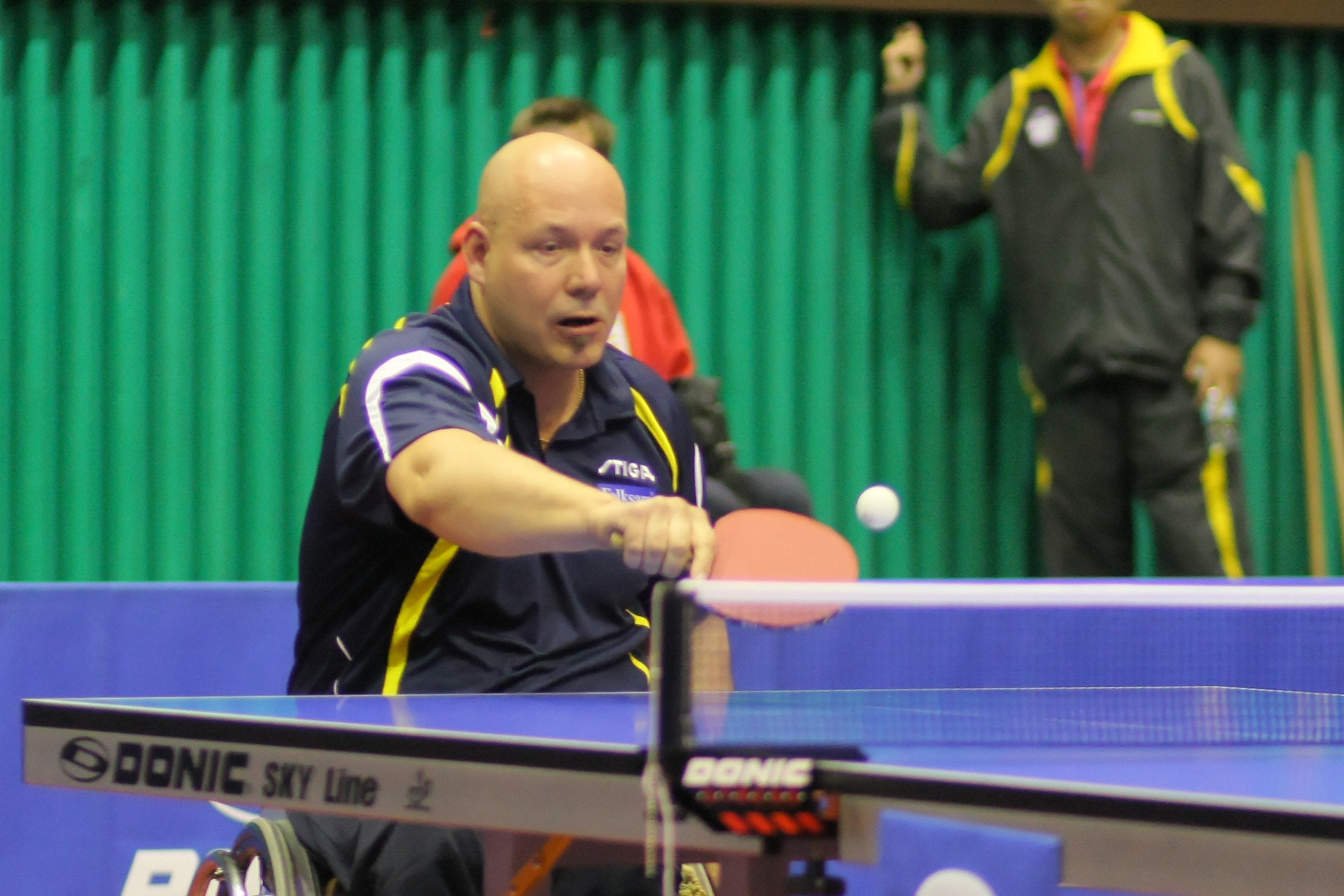

Personal information
- Full name: Ernst Olov Bolldén
- Nationality: Sweden
- Born: 28 September 1966 Njutånger, Sweden
- Died: 30 April 2012 (aged 45) Sweden

Sport
- Sport: Table tennis
Medal record
Representing Sweden
Men's wheelchair table tennis
Paralympic Games
Gold medal – first place	1996 Atlanta	Teams class 4–5
Bronze medal – third place	1996 Atlanta	Singles class 5
Bronze medal – third place	2000 Sydney	Teams class 5
World Championships
Gold medal – first place	1990 Assen	Singles class 5
Gold medal – first place	2006 Montreux	Singles class 5
Silver medal – second place	1998 Paris	Teams class 5
Silver medal – second place	2002 Taipei	Open singles in wheelchair
Silver medal – second place	2002 Taipei	Teams class 5
Silver medal – second place	2006 Montreux	Open singles standing
Bronze medal – third place	1990 Assen	Teams class 5
Bronze medal – third place	1998 Paris	Open singles in wheelchair
Bronze medal – third place	2006 Montreux	Teams class 5
European Championships
Gold medal – first place	1991 Salou	Singles class 5
Gold medal – first place	1995 Hillerod	Singles class 5
Gold medal – first place	1997 Stockholm	Singles class 5
Silver medal – second place	1995 Hillerod	Teams class 5
Silver medal – second place	2009 Genoa	Teams class 4
Bronze medal – third place	1999 Piestany	Open singles in wheelchair
Bronze medal – third place	2003 Zagreb	Singles class 5
Bronze medal – third place	2003 Zagreb	Teams class 5
Bronze medal – third place	2009 Genoa	Singles class 5

Ernst Olov Bolldén (28 September 1966 – 30 April 2012) was a Swedish wheelchair table tennis player. He represented Sweden at every Summer Paralympics from 1988 to 2004 and won medals for para table tennis. He was on the gold-winning Swedish team at the 1996 Atlanta Paralympics and won a bronze in men's singles at that same Games. He won another bronze in the men's team event at the 2000 Sydney Paralympics.

Bolldén was born in Njutånger, Sweden. He had a twin brother and two older brothers. Bolldén became paralysed from the waist and down in a schoolyard accident in Iggesund in 1979.

In July 2011, he was diagnosed with invasive bladder cancer. Bolldén died on 30 April 2012. He was 45.

== Career records ==
=== Olympic Games ===
- 1996: Olympic gold in team wheelchair
- 1996: OS bronze in single wheelchair
- 2000: OS bronze in team wheelchair

=== World Championship ===
- 1986: World Cup silver in single wheelchair
- 1986: World Cup silver in team wheelchair
- 1990: World Cup Gold in single wheelchair
- 1990: World Cup Bronze in Team Wheelchair
- 1998: World Cup silver in team wheelchair
- 1998: World Cup bronze in single wheelchair
- 2002: WM-silver in team wheelchair
- 2002: WM silver in single wheelchair
- 2006: WM gold in single wheelchair

=== European Championships ===
- 1991: Euro gold in single wheelchair
- 1995: Euro gold in single wheelchair
- 1995: EM-silver in layers of wheelchair
- 1997: Euro gold in single wheelchair
- 1999: EM bronze in open wheelchair class
- 2003: EM bronze in single wheelchair
- 2003: EM bronze in team wheelchair
- 2009: EM bronze in single wheelchair
- 2009: EM-silver in layers of wheelchair

=== Other credits ===
- Nominated for the award for the year's athletes with disabilities to the Swedish Athletics 2007.
- 2006: Elected best player or World Championships in wheelchair men category.
