= Asian Para Table Tennis Championships =

International disability sport competition

Asian Para Table Tennis Championships are a biennial sports event for para table tennis players who represent an Asian country. It debuted in 2005 as Asia and Oceania Championships but separated in 2013.

== Locations ==
The competitor numbers are of Asian countries and their table tennis players between the years 2005 and 2011.

Edition	Year	Host	Dates	Competitors	Countries	Top medalists	Ref
Asia/South Pacific Table Tennis Championships
1	2005	(Malaysia) Kuala Lumpur	19–26 June	123	9	China	
Asia and Oceania Championships
1	2007	(South Korea) Seoul	10–17 November	143	11	China	
2	2009	(Jordan) Amman	22–29 October	129	12	China	
3	2011	Hong Kong	14–21 December	163	13	China	
Asian Championships
1	2013	(China) Beijing	16–23 October	165	13	China	
2	2015	(Jordan) Amman	22–29 October	174	16	China	
3	2017	(China) Beijing	23–31 August	198	12	China	
4	2019	(Taiwan) Taichung	23–27 July	274	19	China	
5	2025	(China) Beijing	14–19 October	228	18	China	

== All-time medal count ==
As of 2025.

Rank	Nation	Gold	Silver	Bronze	Total
1	China (CHN)	172	90	80	342
2	South Korea (KOR)	61	67	86	214
3	Chinese Taipei (TPE)	10	26	35	71
4	Hong Kong (HKG)	7	13	32	52
5	Indonesia (INA)	7	7	10	24
6	Thailand (THA)	6	21	39	66
7	Japan (JPN)	5	29	36	70
8	North Korea (PRK)	3	1	1	5
9	Iraq (IRQ)	1	2	0	3
10	Jordan (JOR)	0	6	11	17
11	Iran (IRI)	0	4	9	13
12	Malaysia (MAS)	0	3	7	10
13	India (IND)	0	1	6	7
14	Saudi Arabia (KSA)	0	1	2	3
15	Macau (MAC)	0	0	3	3
16	Kuwait (KUW)	0	0	2	2
17	Kazakhstan (KAZ)	0	0	1	1
17	Sri Lanka (SRI)	0	0	1	1
Totals (18 entries)		272	271	361	904

== See also ==
- Oceania Para Table Tennis Championships
- Asian Table Tennis Championships
