= Disability classification in table tennis =

Classification process for Para table tennis

Disability table tennis classification is the disability sport classification process for Para table tennis that is governed by the International Table Tennis Federation. The sport's classifications are open to people with physical and intellectual disabilities.

== Governance ==
In 1983, the rules for this sport and approval for classification was done by the International Table Tennis Federation. This remained the case in 2009.

== Eligibility ==
As of 2012, people with physical and intellectual disabilities are eligible to compete in this sport. In 1983, Cerebral Palsy-International Sports and Recreation Association (CP-ISRA) set the eligibility rules for classification for this sport. They defined cerebral palsy as a non-progressive brain legion that results in impairment. People with cerebral palsy or non-progressive brain damage were eligible for classification by them. The organisation also dealt with classification for people with similar impairments. For their classification system, people with spina bifida were not eligible unless they had medical evidence of loco-motor dysfunction. People with cerebral palsy and epilepsy were eligible provided the condition did not interfere with their ability to compete. People who had strokes were eligible for classification following medical clearance. Competitors with multiple sclerosis, muscular dystrophy and arthrogryposis were not eligible for classification by CP-ISRA, but were eligible for classification by International Sports Organisation for the Disabled for the Games of Les Autres.

== History ==
In 1983, classification for cerebral palsy competitors in this sport was done by the Cerebral Palsy International Sports and Recreation Association. The classification used the classification system designed for field athletics events. In 1983, there were five cerebral palsy classifications. Going into the 2000 Summer Paralympics, there were concerns raised by members of the cerebral palsy community about the need to maintain a multiple functional classification system inside this sport specifically for this class of athletes given the large range of functional ability inside the community with cerebral palsy and other motor functional disabilities. At the New York hosted Empire State Games for the Physically Challenged, this sport was played, with the organisers having hearing and vision impaired classifications, amputee classifications, Les Autres, cerebral palsy and spinal cord disabilities. By the early 1990s, table tennis classification had moved away from medical based system to a functional classification system. Because of issues in objectively identifying functionality that plagued the post Barcelona Games, the IPC unveiled plans to develop a new classification system in 2003. This classification system went into effect in 2007, and defined ten different disability types that were eligible to participate on the Paralympic level. It required that classification be sport specific, and served two roles. The first was that it determined eligibility to participate in the sport and that it created specific groups of sportspeople who were eligible to participate and in which class. The IPC left it up to International Federations to develop their own classification systems within this framework, with the specification that their classification systems use an evidence based approach developed through research.

== Process ==
In table tennis classification, practiced activities are looked at and classifiers may look at things like how a player positions themselves relative to the table, their ability to serve and to return a serve. For Australian competitors in this sport, the sport and classification is managed the national sport federation with support from the Australian Paralympic Committee. There are three types of classification available for Australian competitors: Provisional, national and international. The first is for club level competitions, the second for state and national competitions, and the third for international competitions.

== At the Paralympic Games ==
Only wheelchair classified athletes were eligible to compete at the 1960 Summer Paralympics in Rome in this sport. This continued at the 1964 Summer Paralympics in Tokyo and 1968 Summer Paralympics in Tel Aviv. Competitors with cerebral palsy classifications were allowed to compete at the Paralympics for the first time at the 1984 Summer Paralympics. At the 1992 Summer Paralympics, amputee and wheelchair disability types were eligible to participate, with classification being run through the International Paralympic Committee, with classification being done based on functional disability type. At the 1996 Summer Paralympics, classification for this sport was done at the venue because classification assessment required watching a competitor play the sport.

For the 2016 Summer Paralympics in Rio, the International Paralympic Committee had a zero classification at the Games policy. This policy was put into place in 2014, with the goal of avoiding last minute changes in classes that would negatively impact athlete training preparations. All competitors needed to be internationally classified with their classification status confirmed prior to the Games, with exceptions to this policy being dealt with on a case-by-case basis.

== Future ==
Going forward, disability sport's major classification body, the International Paralympic Committee, is working on improving classification to be more of an evidence-based system as opposed to a performance-based system so as not to punish elite athletes whose performance makes them appear in a higher class alongside competitors who train less.
