= Wheelchair tennis at the Asian Para Games =

Wheelchair Tennis events have been contested at every Asian Para Games since 2010 Asian Games in Guangzhou.

== Editions ==
Games	Year	Host city	Best nation
I	2010	Guangzhou, China	Japan
II	2014	Incheon, South Korea	Japan
III	2018	Jakarta, Indonesia	Japan
IV	2022	Hangzhou, China	Japan
V	2026	Nagoya, Japan	Japan

== Medalists ==
Medal winning teams for every Asian Para Games since 2010 are as follows:

=== Men's singles ===
Year	Gold	Silver	Bronze
2010 Guangzhou	Shingo Kunieda; Japan	Satoshi Saida; Japan	Oh Sang-Oh; South Korea
2014 Incheon	Shingo Kunieda; Japan	Takashi Sanada; Japan	Oh Sang-Oh; South Korea
2018 Jakarta	Shingo Kunieda; Japan	Takashi Sanada; Japan	Kohei Suzuki; Japan
2022 Hangzhou	Tokito Oda; Japan	Takashi Sanada; Japan	Takuya Miki; Japan
2026 Nagoya	Tokito Oda; Japan	Ji Zhenxu; China	Dong Shunjiang; China

=== Men's doubles ===
Year	Gold	Silver	Bronze
2010 Guangzhou	Japan (JPN); Shingo Kunieda; Satoshi Saida	South Korea (KOR); Lee Ha-Gel; Oh Sang-ho	Thailand (THA); Suthi Khlongrua; Sumrerng Kruamai
2014 Incheon	Japan (JPN); Shingo Kunieda; Takashi Sanada	South Korea (KOR); Lee Ha-Gel; Oh Sang-ho	Thailand (THA); Suwitchai Merngprom; Wittaya Peem-Mee
2018 Jakarta	Japan (JPN); Shingo Kunieda; Takashi Sanada	South Korea (KOR); Im Ho-won; Lee Ha-gel	Sri Lanka (SRI); Lasantha Ranaweera; Suresh Dharmasena
2022 Hangzhou	South Korea (KOR); Im Ho-won; Han Sungbong	Malaysia (MAS); Moh. bin Yusuff Yusshazwan; Abu Samah bin Burhan	Japan (JPN); Takuya Miki; Takashi Sanada
2026 Nagoya	Japan (JPN); Daisuki Arai; Tokido Oda	South Korea (KOR); Im Ho-won; Han Sungbong	Thailand (THA); Naluemitr Benkhunthod; Kittiphong Wongcharoen

=== Women's singles ===
Year	Gold	Silver	Bronze
2010 Guangzhou	Sakhorn Khanthasit; Thailand	Dong Fuli; China	Jinlian Huang; China
2014 Incheon	Sakhorn Khanthasit; Thailand	Jinlian Huang; China	Yui Kamiji; Japan
2018 Jakarta	Yui Kamiji; Japan	Zhu Zhenzhen; China	Momoko Ohtani; Japan
2022 Hangzhou	Yui Kamiji; Japan	Zhu Zhenzhen; China	Ziying Wang; Japan
2026 Nagoya	Li Xiaohui; China	Yui Kamiji; Japan	Momoko Ohtani; Japan

=== Women's doubles ===
Year	Gold	Silver	Bronze
2010 Guangzhou	Thailand (THA); Sakhorn Khanthasit; Ratana Techamaneewat	Japan (JPN); Kanako Domori; Yuko Okabe	Chinese Taipei (TPE); Lu Chia-Yi; Wu Yi-Shan
2014 Incheon	Thailand (THA); Sakhorn Khanthasit; Wanitha Inthanin	Japan (JPN); Kanako Domori; Yui Kamiji	South Korea (KOR); Myung-Hee Hwang; Ju-Yeon Park
2018 Jakarta	China (CHN); Hui Min Huang; Zhu Zhenzhen	Japan (JPN); Yui Kamiji; Manami Tanaka	Thailand (THA); Sakhorn Khanthasit; Wanitha Inthanin
2022 Hangzhou	Japan (JPN); Yui Kamiji; Manami Tanaka	China (CHN); Guo Luoyao; Zhu Zhenzhen	Thailand (THA); Sakhorn Khanthasit; Thipaksorn Singkeaw
2026 Nagoya	China (CHN); Li Xiaohui; Ziying Wang	Japan (JPN); Yui Kamiji; Momoko Ohtani	Japan (JPN); Saki Takamuro; Manami Tanaka

=== Quad singles ===
Year	Gold	Silver	Bronze
2014 Incheon	Mitsuteru Moroishi; Japan	Shota Kawano; Japan	Kim Kyu-seung; South Korea
2018 Jakarta	Kim Kyu-seung; South Korea	Koji Sugeno; Japan	Mitsuteru Moroishi; Japan
2022 Hangzhou	Koji Sugeno; Japan	Daisuke Ishito; Japan	Sombut Yamphapa; Thailand
2026 Nagoya	Kei Usami; Japan	Booncherd Jayien; Thailand	Chu-Yin Huang; Chinese Taipei

=== Quad doubles ===
Year	Gold	Silver	Bronze
2014 Incheon	Japan (JPN); Mitsuteru Moroishi; Shota Kawano	South Korea (KOR); Kim Kyu-seung; Ho-Sang Wang	Chinese Taipei (TPE); Chu-Yin Huang; Tzu-Hsuan Huang
2018 Jakarta	Japan (JPN); Mitsuteru Moroishi; Koji Sugeno	South Korea (KOR); Kim Kyu-seung; Kim Myung-je	Chinese Taipei (TPE); Chu-Yin Huang; Tzu-Hsuan Huang
2022 Hangzhou	Japan (JPN); Daisuke Ishito; Koji Sugeno	Thailand (THA); Chonlaphat Sorod; Sombut Yamphapa	Chinese Taipei (TPE); Chu-Yin Huang; Tzu-Hsuan Huang
2026 Nagoya	Japan (JPN); Kei Usami; Shota Kawano	Thailand (THA); Chonlaphat Sorod; Sombut Yamphapa	South Korea (KOR); Cha Minhyeong; Kim Myung-je

== Medals (2010-2026) ==
Rank	Nation	Gold	Silver	Bronze	Total
1	Japan (JPN)	18	13	9	40
2	Thailand (THA)	4	2	6	12
3	China (CHN)	3	7	2	12
4	South Korea (KOR)	3	5	5	13
5	Malaysia (MAS)	0	1	0	1
6	Chinese Taipei (TPE)	0	0	5	5
7	Sri Lanka (SRI)	0	0	1	1
Totals (7 entries)		28	28	28	84
