= Japan at the 2010 Asian Para Games =

- IOC code: JPN
- NPC: Japan Paralympic Committee

in Guangzhou 12–19 December 2010
- Competitors: 225 in 19 sports
- Medals Ranked 2nd: Gold 32 Silver 39 Bronze 32 Total 103

Asian Para Games appearances (overview)
- 2010; 2014; 2018; 2022; 2026

Japan participated in the 2010 Asian Para Games which was the first Asian Para Games in Guangzhou, China from 13 to 19 December 2010. Athletes from Japan achieved a total of 103 medals, including 32 gold. They finished second at the medal table, one spot behind the host nation China.

== Medalists ==
The following Japan competitors won medals at the Games.

Medal	Name	Sport	Event	Date
Gold	Shinichi Saito	Archery	Men's individual compound W1	13 December
Gold	Miho Nagano	Archery	Women's individual compound open	13 December
Gold	Yuka Kawamura	Swimming	Women's 50 m backstroke S5	13 December
Gold	Keiichi Kimura	Swimming	Men's 200 m individual medley SM11	13 December
Gold	Takayuki Suzuki	Swimming	Men's 200 m freestyle S5	13 December
Gold	Takuro Yamada	Swimming	Men's 400 m freestyle S9	13 December
Gold	Hiroshi Hosokawa	Swimming	Men's 400 m freestyle S7	13 December
Gold	Sugako Takeuchi	Swimming	Women's 50 m freestyle S5	14 December
Gold	Kenta Sato	Swimming	Men's 100 m freestyle S12	14 December
Gold	Chikako Ono	Swimming	Women's 100 m backstroke S11	14 December
Gold	Shunsuke Manose	Swimming	Men's 100 m backstroke S10	14 December
Gold	Takayuki Suzuki	Swimming	Men's 100 m freestyle S5	14 December
Gold	Yuji Kato	Judo	Men's −81 kg	15 December
Gold	Hidekatsu Takahashi	Judo	Men's −73 kg	15 December
Gold	Naohiko Okumura	Cycling	Road cycling mixed time trial H	15 December
Gold	Yasufumi Ito; Tatsuyuki Oshiro	Cycling	Track cycling mixed time trial B	15 December
Gold	Keiichi Kimura	Swimming	Men's 50 m freestyle S11	15 December
Gold	Uran Sawada	Athletics	Women's 100 m T13	15 December
Gold	Kenta Sato	Swimming	Men's 100 m butterfly S13	16 December
Gold	Tomotaro Nakamura	Swimming	Men's 100 m breaststroke SB7	16 December
Gold	Yusuke Hatsuse	Judo	Men's −90 kg	17 December
Gold	Daisuke Ejima	Swimming	Men's 50 m butterfly S7	17 December
Gold	Kenta Sato	Swimming	Men's 100 m backstroke S12	17 December
Gold	Atsushi Yamamoto	Athletics	Men's 100 m T42	17 December
Gold	Yuki Temma	Athletics	Women's 200 m T11	17 December
Gold	Keita Sato	Athletics	Men's 200 m T44	17 December
Gold	Erika Yoshida; Miki Uramoto; Yui Kitama; Moe Uchimi; Tomoe Soeda; Chika Uemura; Mayo Hagino; Shoko Osuna; Ikumi Inoue; Mari Amimoto	Wheelchair basketball	Women's tournament	18 December
Gold	Shingo Kunieda	Wheelchair tennis	Men's singles	18 December
Gold	Ayako Suzuki	Badminton	Women's singles BMSTU5	18 December
Gold	Shingo Kunieda; Satoshi Saida	Wheelchair tennis	Men's doubles	18 December
Gold	Shingo Fujii; Tomomi Masubuchi; Kazuyuki Tokairin; Masatsugu Shinoda; Satoshi Sato; Satoru Sakamoto; Kazuyuki Kyoya; Akira Toyoshima; Fumiaki Shiromaru; Tetsuya Miyajima; Daisuke Tsuchiko; Reo Fujimoto	Wheelchair basketball	Men's tournament	18 December
Gold	Kota Hokinoue	Athletics	Men's marathon T54	19 December
Silver	Masashi Ishii	Cycling	Track cycling men's individual pursuit C	13 December
Silver	Masaki Fujita	Cycling	Track cycling mixed individual pursuit C	13 December
Silver	Kenta Sato	Swimming	Men's 50 m freestyle S12	13 December
Silver	Yukako Hata	Swimming	Women's 400 m freestyle S9	13 December
Silver	Jun Hiromichi	Athletics	Men's 800 m T53	13 December
Silver	Daisuke Maeda	Rowing	Men's single sculls	14 December
Silver	Kayoko Matsui; Miho Hamada	Rowing	Mixed double sculls	14 December
Silver	Masashi Ishii	Cycling	Road cycling mixed time trial C	14 December
Silver	Toshiki Aomatsu	Bowling	Singles TPB1	14 December
Silver	Takaaki Hirai	Judo	Men's −60 kg	14 December
Silver	Mayumi Yoneda	Judo	Women's −63 kg	14 December
Silver	Mei Ichinose	Swimming	Women's 50 m freestyle S9	14 December
Silver	Naomi Ikinaga	Swimming	Women's 50 m freestyle S11	14 December
Silver	Manami Nomura	Swimming	Women's 100 m breaststroke SB9	14 December
Silver	Chikara Ara	Swimming	Men's 100 m breaststroke SB8	14 December
Silver	Erika Nara	Swimming	Women's 100 m freestyle S6	14 December
Silver	Junichi Kawai	Swimming	Men's 100 m backstroke S11	14 December
Silver	Naomi Ikinaga	Swimming	Women's 100 m freestyle S11	14 December
Silver	Takuro Yamada	Swimming	Men's 100 m butterfly S9	14 December
Silver	Ayumi Tanaka	Judo	Women's −57 kg	15 December
Silver	Daisuke Ejima	Swimming	Men’s 100 m backstroke S7	15 December
Silver	Takuro Yamada	Swimming	Men’s 100 m freestyle S9	15 December
Silver	Yasuaki Sato; Shohei Miyamoto; Hiroshi Hosokawa; Takuro Yamada	Swimming	Men’s 4 × 100 m freestyle relay 34 points	15 December
Silver	Shinichi Shirota	Athletics	Men's 200 m T12	15 December
Silver	Tadashi Horikoshi	Athletics	Men's 5000 m T12	15 December
Silver	Toshiki Aomatsu; Akiko Morisawa	Bowling	Doubles TPB1+TPB3	16 December
Silver	Sugako Takeuchi	Swimming	Women's 50 m backstroke S5	16 December
Silver	Keiichi Kimura	Swimming	Men's 100 m breaststroke SB11	16 December
Silver	Yuri Kitamura	Swimming	Women's 100 m breaststroke SB5	16 December
Silver	Takuro Yamada	Swimming	Men's 200 m individual medley SM9	16 December
Silver	Kyosuke Oyama	Swimming	Men's 200 m individual medley SM6	16 December
Silver	Kanako Domori; Yuko Okabe	Wheelchair tennis	Women's doubles	17 December
Silver	Naomi Ikinaga	Swimming	Women's 200 m individual medley SM11	17 December
Silver	Saki Takakuwa	Athletics	Women's 100 m T44	17 December
Silver	Akiko Adachi; Masae Komiya; Akane Nakashima; Yuki Naoi; Masako Nomura; Rie Urata	Goalball	Women's tournament	18 December
Silver	Satoshi Saida	Wheelchair tennis	Men's singles	18 December
Silver	Daisuke Ejima; Chikara Ara; Yasuaki Sato; Takuro Yamada	Swimming	Men’s 4 × 100 m medley relay 34 points	18 December
Silver	Mamiko Osada; Sachie Awano; Yukari Okahira; Junko Fujii; Yoko Saito; Shiori Ohmura; Michiyo Nishiie; Noriko Kaneda; Satoko Kikuchi; Kimiko Kobatake; Harumi Sakamoto	Sitting volleyball	Women's tournament	18 December
Silver	Masayuki Higuchi	Athletics	Men's marathon T54	19 December
Bronze	Shunsuke Manose	Swimming	Men's 400 m freestyle S10	13 December
Bronze	Jumpei Kimura	Swimming	Men's 400 m freestyle S7	13 December
Bronze	Atsumi Tanaka	Judo	Women's −52 kg	14 December
Bronze	Hiroshi Hosokawa	Swimming	Men's 50 m freestyle S7	14 December
Bronze	Tomomi Ishiura	Swimming	Women's 100 m backstroke S11	14 December
Bronze	Kyosuke Oyama	Swimming	Men's 50 m freestyle S6	14 December
Bronze	Yukako Hata	Swimming	Women's 100 m backstroke S10	14 December
Bronze	Kota Hokinoue	Athletics	Men's 5000 m T54	14 December
Bronze	Osamu Nagashima	Badminton	Men's singles BMW2	14 December
Bronze	Makoto Hirose	Judo	Men's -66 kg	15 December
Bronze	Takayuki Suzuki	Swimming	Men's 50 m butterfly S5	15 December
Bronze	Junichi Kawai	Swimming	Men's 50 m freestyle S11	15 December
Bronze	Hiroshi Hosokawa	Swimming	Men's 100 m backstroke S7	15 December
Bronze	Jun Haruta	Athletics	Men's 400 m T44	15 December
Bronze	Jumpei Kimura	Swimming	Men's 100 m breaststroke SB7	16 December
Bronze	Chikako Ono	Swimming	Women's 100 m freestyle S11	16 December
Bronze	Hiroshi Hosokawa	Swimming	Men's 100 m freestyle S7	16 December
Bronze	Hiroyuki Yasui	Athletics	Men's triple jump F46	16 December
Bronze	Jun Hiromichi	Athletics	Men's 400 m T53	16 December
Bronze	Aki Taguchi	Shooting	Mixed 50 m free rifle R6-SH1	17 December
Bronze	Haruka Hirose	Judo	Men's −100 kg	17 December
Bronze	Chikako Ono	Swimming	Women's 200 m individual medley SM11	17 December
Bronze	Jumpei Kimura	Swimming	Men's 50 m butterfly S7	17 December
Bronze	Keiichi Kimura	Swimming	Men's 100 m backstroke S11	17 December
Bronze	Yasuaki Sato	Swimming	Men’s 100 m butterfly S9	17 December
Bronze	Hidetoshi Suzuki	Athletics	Men's 200 m T11	17 December
Bronze	Tetsuo Ura	Badminton	Men's singles BMSTU4	17 December
Bronze	Jun Haruta	Athletics	Men's 200 m T44	17 December
Bronze	Shinichi Shirota	Athletics	Men's 400 m T12	17 December
Bronze	Nobukazu Hanaoka	Athletics	Men's 1500 m T54	17 December
Bronze	Naoyoshi Kagayama; Keisuke Kawabe; Kenji Hashimoto; Yuji Yamada; Taisei Taniguchi; Ryuta Yoshino; Koji Watarai; Daisuke Kobayashi; Tetsuya Toda; Tsukasa Kawano; Takayuki Iwasa	Football 7-a-side	Men's tournament	18 December
Bronze	Jun Haruta; Keita Sato; Toru Suzuki; Tomoki Tagawa	Athletics	Men's 4 × 100 m relay T42–T46	18 December

== Medal summary ==
=== Medals by sport ===
Medals by sport
Sport	1st place, gold medalist(s)	2nd place, silver medalist(s)	3rd place, bronze medalist(s)	Total
Swimming	15	20	16	51
Athletics	5	5	9	19
Judo	3	3	3	9
Cycling	2	3	0	5
Wheelchair tennis	2	2	0	4
Archery	2	0	0	2
Wheelchair basketball	2	0	0	2
Badminton	1	0	2	3
Bowling	0	2	0	2
Rowing	0	2	0	2
Goalball	0	1	0	1
Sitting volleyball	0	1	0	1
Football 7-a-side	0	0	1	1
Shooting	0	0	1	1
Total	32	39	32	103

=== Medals by day ===
Medals by day
Day	Date	1st place, gold medalist(s)	2nd place, silver medalist(s)	3rd place, bronze medalist(s)	Total
1	December 13	7	5	2	14
2	December 14	5	14	7	26
3	December 15	6	6	5	17
4	December 16	2	6	5	13
5	December 17	6	3	11	20
6	December 18	5	4	2	11
7	December 19	1	1	0	2
Total		32	39	32	103

== See also ==
- Japan at the 2010 Asian Games
