= Kordestani =

Kordestani (Persian: کردستانی) is a Persian surname. Notable people with the surname include:

- Eshrat Kordestani (born 1984), Iranian Paralympian in Sitting volleyball
- Hassan Kordestani, Iranian footballer
- Omid Kordestani (born 1963), Iranian-Kurdish American businessman
