= Wheelchair tennis at the 2010 Asian Para Games =

Wheelchair tennis at the 2010 Asian Para Games were held in Tianhe Tennis School, Guangzhou, China PR, from December 13 to December 18. There were 4 gold medals in this sport.

== Medal summary ==
=== Medal table ===
Retrieved from Asian Para Games 2010 Official Website.

Rank	Nation	Gold	Silver	Bronze	Total
1	Japan (JPN)	2	2	0	4
2	Thailand (THA)	2	0	1	3
3	China (CHN)	0	1	1	2
3	South Korea (KOR)	0	1	1	2
5	Chinese Taipei (TPE)	0	0	1	1
Totals (5 entries)		4	4	4	12

=== Medalists ===
Event	Gold	Silver	Bronze
Men's singles	Shingo Kunieda; Japan	Satoshi Saida; Japan	Oh Sang-ho; South Korea
Men's doubles	Japan (JPN); Shingo Kunieda; Satoshi Saida	South Korea (KOR); Lee Ha-Gel; Oh Sang-ho	Thailand (THA); Suthi Khlongrua; Sumrerng Kruamai
Women's singles	Sakhorn Khanthasit; Thailand	Dong Fuli; China	Huang Jin Lian; China
Women's doubles	Thailand (THA); Sakhorn Khanthasit; Ratana Techamaneewat	Japan (JPN); Kanako Domori; Yuko Okabe	Chinese Taipei (TPE); Lu Chia-Yi; Wu Yi-Shan

== Result ==
=== Men's singles ===
==== Finals ====
First Round – December 13
	Score		Game 1	Game 2	Game 3
Wei Zujun (CHN)	2–0	Kee King Hong (MAS)	6–0	6–0	
Suwitchai Merngprom (THA)	2–0	Sunil Perera (SRI)	6–0	6–0	
Balachandar Subramanian (IND)	0–2	Mohammed Hamdan (IRQ)	1–6	2–6	
Cheng Han Tsung (TPE)	0–2	Upali Rajakaruna (SRI)	6–7	0–6	
Mohammad Yaghoubi (IRI)	0–2	Suthi Khlongrua (THA)	3–6	1–6	
Hossein Mamipour (IRI)	2–0	Mariappan Durai (IND)	6–0	6–0	
Kwok Wing Kwai (HKG)	0–2	Abu Samah Borhan (MAS)	0–6	0–6	
Feng Xiaomin (CHN)	2–0	Tai Chia-Yang (TPE)	6–2	6–0	
Mohammed Thalij (IRQ)	0–2	Dissanayaka Gamini (SRI)	3–6	3–6	

Second Round; December 14
1	Shingo Kunieda (JPN)	6	6
Wei Zujun (CHN)	0	0
Suwitchai Merngprom (THA)	6	4	6
6	Kim Sam-Ju (KOR)	4	6	7
3	Yoshinobu Fujimoto (JPN)	6	6
Mohammed Hamdan (IRQ)	0	0
Upali Rajakaruna (SRI)	3	0
8	Suthi Khlongrua (THA)	6	6
7	Sumrerng Kruamai (THA)	6	6
Hossein Mamipour (IRI)	1	2
Abu Samah Borhan (MAS)	1	2
4	Oh Sang-ho (KOR)	6	6
5	Lee Ha-Gel (KOR)	6	6
Feng Xiaomin (CHN)	2	0
Dissanayaka Gamini (SRI)	2	1
2	Satoshi Saida (JPN)	6	6

Quarterfinal; December 16
1	Shingo Kunieda (JPN)	6	6
6	Kim Sam-Ju (KOR)	1	2
3	Yoshinobu Fujimoto (JPN)	6	6
8	Suthi Khlongrua (THA)	2	3
7	Sumrerng Kruamai (THA)	3	3
4	Oh Sang-ho (KOR)	6	6
5	Lee Ha-Gel (KOR)	3	1
2	Satoshi Saida (JPN)	6	6

Semifinal; December 17
1	Shingo Kunieda (JPN)	6	6
3	Yoshinobu Fujimoto (JPN)	1	0
4	Oh Sang-ho (KOR)	3	1
2	Satoshi Saida (JPN)	6	6

Final; December 18
1	Shingo Kunieda (JPN)	6	6
2	Satoshi Saida (JPN)	3	3

Bronze medal match – December 18
	Score		Game 1	Game 2	Game 3
Yoshinobu Fujimoto (JPN)	0–2	Oh Sang-ho (KOR)	6–7	2–6	

==== Consolation ====
Consolation Quarterfinal; December 15
115	Sunil Perera (SRI)
446	Mariappan Durai (IND)
Kwok Wing Kwai (HKG)	wo
251	Kee King Hong (MAS)	6	6
Cheng Han Tsung (TPE)	2	1
446	B. Subramanian (IND)	0	3
183	Mohammad Yaghoubi (IRI)	6	6

Consolation Semifinal; December 16
115	Sunil Perera (SRI)	6	6
Kwok Wing Kwai (HKG)	2	2
251	Kee King Hong (MAS)	3	0
183	Mohammad Yaghoubi (IRI)	6	6

Consolation Final; December 17
115	Sunil Perera (SRI)	2	4
183	Mohammad Yaghoubi (IRI)	6	6

=== Men's doubles ===
Round of 16; December 16
1	Shingo Kunieda (JPN); Satoshi Saida (JPN)
Abu Samah Borhan (MAS); Kee King Hong (MAS)
3	Suthi Khlongrua (THA); Sumrerng Kruamai (THA)
Cheng Han Tsung (TPE); Tai Chia-Yang (TPE)	6	6
Mariappan Durai (IND); B. Subramanian (IND)	1	1
Hossein Mamipour (IRI); Mohammad Yaghoubi (IRI)	6	5	4
Feng Xiaomin (CHN); Wei Zujun (CHN)	4	7	6
4	Dissanayaka Gamini (SRI); Upali Rajakaruna (SRI)
Mohammed Hamdan (IRQ); Mohammed Thalij (IRQ)
2	Lee Ha-Gel (KOR); Oh Sang-ho (KOR)

Quarterfinal; December 16
1	Shingo Kunieda (JPN); Satoshi Saida (JPN)	6	6
Abu Samah Borhan (MAS); Kee King Hong (MAS)	1	0
3	Suthi Khlongrua (THA); Sumrerng Kruamai (THA)	6	6
Cheng Han Tsung (TPE); Tai Chia-Yang (TPE)	1	0
Feng Xiaomin (CHN); Wei Zujun (CHN)	6	2	6
4	Dissanayaka Gamini (SRI); Upali Rajakaruna (SRI)	1	6	3
Mohammed Hamdan (IRQ); Mohammed Thalij (IRQ)	0	0
2	Lee Ha-Gel (KOR); Oh Sang-ho (KOR)	6	6

Semifinal; December 17
1	Shingo Kunieda (JPN); Satoshi Saida (JPN)	6	6
3	Suthi Khlongrua (THA); Sumrerng Kruamai (THA)	2	0
Feng Xiaomin (CHN); Wei Zujun (CHN)	1	1
2	Lee Ha-Gel (KOR); Oh Sang-ho (KOR)	6	6

Final; December 18
1	Shingo Kunieda (JPN); Satoshi Saida (JPN)	6	6
Lee Ha-Gel (KOR); Oh Sang-ho (KOR)	0	2

Bronze medal match – December 17
	Score		Game 1	Game 2	Game 3
Suthi Khlongrua (THA); Sumrerng Kruamai (THA)	2–0	Feng Xiaomin (CHN); Wei Zujun (CHN)	6–1	6–4	

=== Women's singles ===
First Round; December 13
1	Park Ju-Yeon (KOR)
So Tze Yan Susanna (HKG)	0	0
Sakhorn Khanthasit (THA)	6	6
3	Yuko Okabe (JPN)	6	3	6
Lu Chia Yi (TPE)	3	6	4
Huang Jin Lian (CHN)	7	6
R. Techamaneewat (THA)	5	2
Tang Siu Lin Eliza (HKG)	2	0
Wu Yi-Shan (TPE)	6	6
Dong Fuli (CHN)	6	7
4	Yui Kamiji (JPN)	4	6
Choosri Inthanin (THA)	6	6
Faizatul Abdullah (MAS)	0	0
Huang Huimin (CHN)	1	1
2	Kanako Domori (JPN)	6	6

Quarterfinal; December 14
1	Park Ju-Yeon (KOR)	6	1	4
Sakhorn Khanthasit (THA)	4	6	6
3	Yuko Okabe (JPN)	2	1
Huang Jin Lian (CHN)	6	6
Wu Yi-Shan (TPE)	0	0
Dong Fuli (CHN)	6	6
Choosri Inthanin (THA)	5	1
2	Kanako Domori (JPN)	7	6

Semifinal; December 16
Sakhorn Khanthasit (THA)	6	6
Huang Jin Lian (CHN)	1	1
Dong Fuli (CHN)	7	6
2	Kanako Domori (JPN)	5	1

Final; December 18
Sakhorn Khanthasit (THA)	6	1	7
Dong Fuli (CHN)	4	6	5

Bronze medal match – December 18
	Score		Game 1	Game 2	Game 3
Huang Jin Lian (CHN)	2–0	Kanako Domori (JPN)	6–3	7–5	

=== Women's doubles ===
Round Robin – December 13 to 17
	Score		Game 1	Game 2	Game 3
Lu Chia Yi (TPE); Wu Yi-Shan (TPE)	2–0	Huang Huimin (CHN); Huang Jin Lian (CHN)	6–3	6–4	
Sakhorn Khanthasit (THA); Ratana Techamaneewat (THA)	2–0	So Tze Yan Susanna (HKG); Tang Siu Lin Eliza (HKG)	6–0	6–0	
Lu Chia Yi (TPE); Wu Yi-Shan (TPE)	2–0	So Tze Yan Susanna (HKG); Tang Siu Lin Eliza (HKG)	6–0	6–0	
Kanako Domori (JPN); Yuko Okabe (JPN)	2–0	Huang Huimin (CHN); Huang Jin Lian (CHN)	6–4	6–3	
Sakhorn Khanthasit (THA); Ratana Techamaneewat (THA)	2–0	Huang Huimin (CHN); Huang Jin Lian (CHN)	6–3	6–0	
Kanako Domori (JPN); Yuko Okabe (JPN)	2–0	Lu Chia Yi (TPE); Wu Yi-Shan (TPE)	6–0	6–1	
Kanako Domori (JPN); Yuko Okabe (JPN)	2–0	So Tze Yan Susanna (HKG); Tang Siu Lin Eliza (HKG)	6–1	6–0	
Sakhorn Khanthasit (THA); Ratana Techamaneewat (THA)	2–0	Lu Chia Yi (TPE); Wu Yi-Shan (TPE)	6–1	6–2	
Huang Huimin (CHN); Huang Jin Lian (CHN)	2–0	Sakhorn Khanthasit (THA); Ratana Techamaneewat (THA)	6–0	6–1	
Kanako Domori (JPN); Yuko Okabe (JPN)	0–2	So Tze Yan Susanna (HKG); Tang Siu Lin Eliza (HKG)	3–6	3–6	

Rank	Athlete	W	L	Sets W/L	Games W/L
1st place, gold medalist(s)	Sakhorn Khanthasit (THA); Ratana Techamaneewat (THA)	4	0	8 / 0	48 / 12
2nd place, silver medalist(s)	Kanako Domori (JPN); Yuko Okabe (JPN)	3	1	6 / 2	42 / 21
3rd place, bronze medalist(s)	Lu Chia Yi (TPE); Wu Yi-Shan (TPE)	2	2	4 / 4	28 / 31
4	Huang Huimin (CHN); Huang Jin Lian (CHN)	1	3	2 / 6	29 / 37
5	So Tze Yan Susanna (HKG); Tang Siu Lin Eliza (HKG)	0	4	0 / 8	2 / 48
