= Rowing at the 2010 Asian Para Games =

- Venue: International Rowing Centre
- Location: Guangzhou, China
- Dates: 13–14 December

Rowing at the 2010 Asian Para Games was held in International Rowing Centre, Guangzhou, China from December 13 to 14, 2010.

== Medal summary ==
=== Medal table ===
Retrieved from Asian Para Games 2010 Official Website.

Rank	Nation	Gold	Silver	Bronze	Total
1	China (CHN)	4	0	0	4
2	Japan (JPN)	0	2	0	2
3	Hong Kong (HKG)	0	1	3	4
4	South Korea (KOR)	0	1	1	2
Totals (4 entries)		4	4	4	12

=== Medalists ===
Event	Gold	Silver	Bronze
Men's single sculls	Tan Yeteng; China	Daisuke Maeda; Japan	Puk Chi Yeung; Hong Kong
Women's single sculls	Zhang Jinhong; China	Lee Jong-Rye; South Korea	Cho Ping; Hong Kong
Mixed double sculls	China (CHN); Shan Zilong; Tong Chandu	Japan (JPN); Miho Hamada; Kayoko Matsui	Hong Kong (HKG); Lui Hiu Yu; Yau Tak Hing
Mixed coxed four	China (CHN); Li Ming; Lin Cuizhi; Wang Wei; Zeng Haiyan; Cox: Chen Lianjia	Hong Kong (HKG); Chan Ka Man; Chan Yuen Wah; Cheng Sze Lung; Kwok Wing; Cox: Yiu Ka Lai	South Korea (KOR); Jeong Joo-Mi; Park Wan-Soon; Shin Young-Soo; You Sun-Ok; Cox: Lee Jae-Nam

== Results ==
=== Men's single sculls ===
==== Heat ====
December 13

Rank	Athlete	Time
1	Park Jun-Ha (KOR)	5:18.998
2	Tan Yeteng (CHN)	5:22.424
3	Daisuke Maeda (JPN)	5:49.131
4	Puk Chi Yeung (HKG)	6:10.465

==== Final ====
December 14

Rank	Athlete	Time
1st place, gold medalist(s)	Tan Yeteng (CHN)	5:00.877
2nd place, silver medalist(s)	Daisuke Maeda (JPN)	5:29.780
3rd place, bronze medalist(s)	Puk Chi Yeung (HKG)	5:45.763
4	Park Jun-Ha (KOR)	

=== Women's single sculls ===
==== Heat ====
December 13

Rank	Athlete	Time
1	Zhang Jinhong (CHN)	6:06.459
2	Lee Jong-Rye (KOR)	6:18.937
3	Cho Ping (HKG)	6:44.005
4	Yuno Shinada (JPN)	7:53.992

==== Final ====
December 14

Rank	Athlete	Time
1st place, gold medalist(s)	Zhang Jinhong (CHN)	5:45.613
2nd place, silver medalist(s)	Lee Jong-Rye (KOR)	6:09.280
3rd place, bronze medalist(s)	Cho Ping (HKG)	6:25.828
4	Yuno Shinada (JPN)	7:34.888

=== Mixed double sculls ===
==== Heat ====
December 13

Rank	Athlete	Time
1	Tong Chandu and Shan Zilong (CHN)	4:19.346
2	Kayoko Matsui and Miho Hamada (JPN)	5:12.483
3	Yau Tak Hing and Lui Hiu Yu (HKG)	6:56.032
4	Siti Fatimah Ismail and Mohamad Faizal Hisam Johari (MAS)	7:33.304

==== Final ====
December 14

Rank	Athlete	Time
1st place, gold medalist(s)	Tong Chandu and Shan Zilong (CHN)	4:10.605
2nd place, silver medalist(s)	Kayoko Matsui and Miho Hamada (JPN)	5:04.044
3rd place, bronze medalist(s)	Yau Tak Hing and Lui Hiu Yu (HKG)	6:23.948
4	Siti Fatimah Ismail and Mohamad Faizal Hisam Johari (MAS)	6:31.864

=== Mixed coxed four ===
==== Heat ====
December 13

Rank	Athlete	Time
1	Wang, Zeng, Lin, Li, Cox:Chen (CHN)	3:49.236
2	Chan K., Chan Y., Cheng, Kwok, Cox:Yiu (HKG)	4:10.439
3	Kawakami, Kanda, Nishioka, Kanuma, Cox:Yonekawa (JPN)	4:11.247
4	You, Jeong, Shin, Park, Cox:Lee (KOR)	4:14.616

==== Final ====
December 14

Rank	Athlete	Time
1st place, gold medalist(s)	Wang, Zeng, Lin, Li, Cox:Chen (CHN)	3:47.100
2nd place, silver medalist(s)	Chan K., Chan Y., Cheng, Kwok, Cox:Yiu (HKG)	4:01.032
3rd place, bronze medalist(s)	You, Jeong, Shin, Park, Cox:Lee (KOR)	4:05.016
4	Kawakami, Kanda, Nishioka, Kanuma, Cox:Yonekawa (JPN)	4:22.052
