= Judo at the 2010 Asian Para Games =

Judo competition

- Location: Guangzhou, China

Judo at the 2010 Asian Para Games was held in Huagong Gymnasium, Guangzhou, China from December 14 to 17, 2010.

== Medal summary ==
=== Medal table ===
Retrieved from Asian Para Games 2010 Official Website.

Rank	Nation	Gold	Silver	Bronze	Total
1	China (CHN)	6	0	5	11
2	Japan (JPN)	3	3	3	9
3	Iran (IRI)	2	2	2	6
4	South Korea (KOR)	1	1	1	3
5	Mongolia (MGL)	0	2	2	4
6	Thailand (THA)	0	1	2	3
7	Chinese Taipei (TPE)	0	1	1	2
7	Uzbekistan (UZB)	0	1	1	2
Totals (8 entries)		12	11	17	40

=== Medalists ===
==== Men ====
Event	Gold	Silver	Bronze
-60 kg	Li Xiaodong; China	Takaaki Hirai; Japan	Lee Hyeon-Woo; South Korea
-60 kg	Li Xiaodong; China	Takaaki Hirai; Japan	Lee Wu Kai; Chinese Taipei
-66 kg	Saeid Rahmati; Iran	Munkhbat Aajim; Mongolia	Makoto Hirose; Japan
-66 kg	Saeid Rahmati; Iran	Munkhbat Aajim; Mongolia	Zhao Xu; China
-73 kg	Hidekatsu Takahashi; Japan	Sharif Khalilov; Uzbekistan	Mohammad Ali Shanani; Iran
-73 kg	Hidekatsu Takahashi; Japan	Sharif Khalilov; Uzbekistan	Feng Bin; China
-81 kg	Yuji Kato; Japan	Hani Asakereh; Iran	Khasan Kosimov; Uzbekistan
-81 kg	Yuji Kato; Japan	Hani Asakereh; Iran	Xu Zhilin; China
-90 kg	Yusuke Hatsuse; Japan	Ganbat Dashtseren; Mongolia	Du Quanyou; China
-90 kg	Yusuke Hatsuse; Japan	Ganbat Dashtseren; Mongolia	Mirhassan Nattaj; Iran
-100 kg	Choi Gwang-Geun; South Korea	Hamed Alizadeh; Iran	Haruka Hirose; Japan
-100 kg	Choi Gwang-Geun; South Korea	Hamed Alizadeh; Iran	Ochirkhuyag Myagmar; Mongolia
+100 kg	Hamzeh Nadri; Iran	Park Jung-Min; South Korea	Sahas Srijarung; Thailand
+100 kg	Hamzeh Nadri; Iran	Park Jung-Min; South Korea	Wang Song; China

==== Women ====
Event	Gold	Silver	Bronze
-48 kg	Guo Hua Ping; China	Lee Kai Lin; Chinese Taipei	No awarded
-52 kg	Zhang Fuzhen; China	Supawadee Junkaew; Thailand	Bolortuya Purev; Mongolia
-52 kg	Zhang Fuzhen; China	Supawadee Junkaew; Thailand	Atsumi Tanaka; Japan
-57 kg	Wang Lijing; China	Ayumi Tanaka; Japan	No awarded
-63 kg	Cui Na; China	Mayumi Yoneda; Japan	Pornsiri Trachu; Thailand
-70 kg	Li Yu; China	No awarded	No awarded

== Results ==
=== Men ===
==== −60 kg ====
December 14

Preliminary
Tran Viet Hung (VIE)	000
Ganbat Batmagnai (MGL)	111

Quarterfinal
Li Xiaodong (CHN)	100
Khusan Abdiev (UZB)	000
Tsang Chiu Kin (HKG)	000
Lee Hyeon-Woo (KOR)	101
Takaaki Hirai (JPN)	100
Ganbat Batmagnai (MGL)	000
Deterson Omas (PHI)
Lee Wu Kai (TPE)	Hantei

Final of table
Li Xiaodong (CHN)	001
Lee Hyeon-Woo (KOR)	000
Takaaki Hirai (JPN)	100
Lee Wu Kai (TPE)	000

Gold medal
Li Xiaodong (CHN)	001
Takaaki Hirai (JPN)	000

Final of repechage
Khusan Abdiev (UZB)	000
Tsang Chiu Kin (HKG)	100
Ganbat Batmagnai (MGL)	001
Deterson Omas (PHI)	000

Bronze medals
Tsang Chiu Kin (HKG)
Lee Wu Kai (TPE)	Hantei
Ganbat Batmagnai (MGL)	000
Lee Hyeon-Woo (KOR)	100

==== −66 kg ====
December 15

Preliminary
Muhammad Fatah Abu Bakar (MAS)	110
Khasan Abdiev (UZB)	000

Quarterfinal
Saeid Rahmati (IRI)	100
Genner Padilla (PHI)	000
Makoto Hirose (JPN)	110
Zhao Xu (CHN)	000
Fung Kin Kwok (HKG)	120
Muhammad Fatah Abu Bakar (MAS)	001
Munkhbat Aajim (MGL)	100
Yoon Sang-Min (KOR)	000

Final of table
Saeid Rahmati (IRI)	100
Makoto Hirose (JPN)	000
Fung Kin Kwok (HKG)	000
Munkhbat Aajim (MGL)	101

Gold medal
Saeid Rahmati (IRI)	100
Munkhbat Aajim (MGL)	000

Final of repechage
Zhao Xu (CHN)	100
Genner Padilla (PHI)	000
Muhammad Fatah Abu Bakar (MAS)	000
Yoon Sang-Min (KOR)	100

Bronze medals
Fung Kin Kwok (HKG)	000
Zhao Xu (CHN)	100
Yoon Sang-Min (KOR)	000
Makoto Hirose (JPN)	100

==== −73 kg ====
December 15

Quarterfinal		Final of table		Gold medal
Ju Hyeon-Seok (KOR)	forfeit
Wong Yiu Sing (HKG)		Wong Yiu Sing (HKG)	000
Hidekatsu Takahashi (JPN)	100	Hidekatsu Takahashi (JPN)	101
Asad Abbasi (PAK)	000			Hidekatsu Takahashi (JPN)	101
Abdullah Al-Haraz (KUW)	000			Sharif Khalilov (UZB)	000
Feng Bin (CHN)	102	Feng Bin (CHN)	000
Mohammad Ali Shanani (IRI)	000	Sharif Khalilov (UZB)	100
Sharif Khalilov (UZB)	101

Final of repechage
Ju Hyeon-Seok (KOR)	100
Asad Abbasi (PAK)	000
Abdullah Al-Haraz (KUW)	forfeit
Mohammad Ali Shanani (IRI)

Bronze medals
Ju Hyeon-Seok (KOR)	000
Feng Bin (CHN)	100
Mohammad Ali Shanani (IRI)	111
Wong Yiu Sing (HKG)	000

==== −81 kg ====
December 15

Quarterfinal		Final of table		Gold medal
Rung Chatphueng (THA)	000
Khasan Kosimov (UZB)	100	Khasan Kosimov (UZB)	001
Hani Asakereh (IRI)	100	Hani Asakereh (IRI)	100
Atarbayan Batsukh (MGL)	000			Hani Asakereh (IRI)	001
Lee Min-woo (KOR)	000			Yuji Kato (JPN)	101
Xu Zhilin (CHN)	102	Xu Zhilin (CHN)	001
Yuji Kato (JPN)	120	Yuji Kato (JPN)	101
Ali Al-Mutawa (KUW)	000

Final of repechage
Rung Chatphueng (THA)	000
Atarbayan Batsukh (MGL)	101
Lee Min-woo (KOR)	103
Ali Al-Mutawa (KUW)	000

Bronze medals
Atarbayan Batsukh (MGL)	000
Xu Zhilin (CHN)	111
Lee Min-woo (KOR)	000
Khasan Kosimov (UZB)	100

==== −90 kg ====
December 17

Quarterfinal
Krissna Raknak (THA)	000
Mirhassan Nattaj (IRI)	100
Khusan Kasimov (UZB)	000
Yusuke Hatsuse (JPN)	110

Final of table
Mirhassan Nattaj (IRI)
Ganbat Dashtseren (MGL)	Hantei
Yusuke Hatsuse (JPN)	100
Du Quanyou (CHN)	000

Gold medal
Ganbat Dashtseren (MGL)	000
Yusuke Hatsuse (JPN)	120

Bronze medals
Krissna Raknak (THA)	000
Du Quanyou (CHN)	100
Khusan Kasimov (UZB)	000
Mirhassan Nattaj (IRI)	100

==== −100 kg ====
December 17

Round Robin
	Score	
Choi Gwang-Geun (KOR)	121–000	Ochirkhuyag Myagmar (MGL)
Hamed Alizadeh (IRI)	100–000	Mitmongkhon Kaeoka (THA)
Haruka Hirose (JPN)	000–100	Choi Gwang-Geun (KOR)
Hamed Alizadeh (IRI)	120–000	Ochirkhuyag Myagmar (MGL)
Mitmongkhon Kaeoka (THA)	000–100	Haruka Hirose (JPN)
Hamed Alizadeh (IRI)	001–100	Choi Gwang-Geun (KOR)
Haruka Hirose (JPN)	000–001	Ochirkhuyag Myagmar (MGL)
Mitmongkhon Kaeoka (THA)	000–120	Choi Gwang-Geun (KOR)
Hamed Alizadeh (IRI)	100–000	Haruka Hirose (JPN)
Mitmongkhon Kaeoka (THA)	000–100	Ochirkhuyag Myagmar (MGL)

Rank	Athlete	W	L	Pts
1st place, gold medalist(s)	Choi Gwang-Geun (KOR)	4	0	40
2nd place, silver medalist(s)	Hamed Alizadeh (IRI)	3	1	30
3rd place, bronze medalist(s)	Ochirkhuyag Myagmar (MGL)	2	2	15
3rd place, bronze medalist(s)	Haruka Hirose (JPN)	1	3	10
5	Mitmongkhon Kaeoka (THA)	0	4	0

==== +100 kg ====
December 17

Round Robin
	Score	
Park Jung-Min (KOR)	120–000	Sahas Srijarung (THA)
Hamzeh Nadri (IRI)	001–000	Wang Song (CHN)
Looi Yuong Chiat (MAS)	000–100	Park Jung-Min (KOR)
Hamzeh Nadri (IRI)	100–000	Sahas Srijarung (THA)
Wang Song (CHN)	120–000	Looi Yuong Chiat (MAS)
Hamzeh Nadri (IRI)	001–000	Park Jung-Min (KOR)
Looi Yuong Chiat (MAS)	001–120	Sahas Srijarung (THA)
Wang Song (CHN)	000–100	Park Jung-Min (KOR)
Hamzeh Nadri (IRI)	120–000	Looi Yuong Chiat (MAS)
Wang Song (CHN)	100–000	Sahas Srijarung (THA)

Rank	Athlete	W	L	Pts
1st place, gold medalist(s)	Hamzeh Nadri (IRI)	4	0	40
2nd place, silver medalist(s)	Park Jung-Min (KOR)	3	1	30
3rd place, bronze medalist(s)	Wang Song (CHN)	2	2	20
3rd place, bronze medalist(s)	Sahas Srijarung (THA)	1	3	10
5	Looi Yuong Chiat (MAS)	0	4	0

=== Women ===
==== −48 kg ====
December 14

Round Robin
	Score	
Shizuka Hangai (JPN)	000–100	Lee Kai Lin (TPE)
Lee Kai Lin (TPE)	001–010	Guo Hua Ping (CHN)
Shizuka Hangai (JPN)	000–100	Guo Hua Ping (CHN)

Rank	Athlete	W	L	Pts
1st place, gold medalist(s)	Guo Hua Ping (CHN)	2	0	17
2nd place, silver medalist(s)	Lee Kai Lin (TPE)	1	1	10
3	Shizuka Hangai (JPN)	0	2	0

==== −52 kg ====
December 14

Round Robin
	Score	
Bolortuya Purev (MGL)	100–000	Atsumi Tanaka (JPN)
Zhang Fuzhen (CHN)	100–001	Supawadee Junkaew (THA)
Trieu Thi Nhoi (VIE)	000–100	Bolortuya Purev (MGL)
Zhang Fuzhen (CHN)	111–000	Atsumi Tanaka (JPN)
Supawadee Junkaew (THA)	000–100	Trieu Thi Nhoi (VIE)
Zhang Fuzhen (CHN)	120–000	Bolortuya Purev (MGL)
Trieu Thi Nhoi (VIE)	000–100	Atsumi Tanaka (JPN)
Supawadee Junkaew (THA)	120–000	Bolortuya Purev (MGL)
Zhang Fuzhen (CHN)	121–000	Trieu Thi Nhoi (VIE)
Supawadee Junkaew (THA)	101–000	Atsumi Tanaka (JPN)

Rank	Athlete	W	L	Pts
1st place, gold medalist(s)	Zhang Fuzhen (CHN)	4	0	40
2nd place, silver medalist(s)	Supawadee Junkaew (THA)	2	2	20
3rd place, bronze medalist(s)	Bolortuya Purev (MGL)	2	2	20
3rd place, bronze medalist(s)	Atsumi Tanaka (JPN)	1	3	10
5	Trieu Thi Nhoi (VIE)	1	3	10

==== −57 kg ====
December 15

Round Robin
	Score	
Kannika Eamthaisong (THA)	000–100	Ayumi Tanaka (JPN)
Ayumi Tanaka (JPN)	000–101	Wang Lijing (CHN)
Kannika Eamthaisong (THA)	000–120	Wang Lijing (CHN)

Rank	Athlete	W	L	Pts
1st place, gold medalist(s)	Wang Lijing (CHN)	2	0	20
2nd place, silver medalist(s)	Ayumi Tanaka (JPN)	1	1	10
3	Kannika Eamthaisong (THA)	0	2	0

==== −63 kg ====
December 15

Round Robin
	Score	
Mayumi Yoneda (JPN)	000–100	Cui Na (CHN)
Pornsiri Trachu (THA)	120–000	Ganchimeg Zundui (MGL)
Mayumi Yoneda (JPN)	100–000	Pornsiri Trachu (THA)
Cui Na (CHN)	120–000	Ganchimeg Zundui (MGL)
Mayumi Yoneda (JPN)	100–000	Ganchimeg Zundui (MGL)
Cui Na (CHN)	100–000	Pornsiri Trachu (THA)

Rank	Athlete	W	L	Pts
1st place, gold medalist(s)	Cui Na (CHN)	3	0	30
2nd place, silver medalist(s)	Mayumi Yoneda (JPN)	2	1	20
3rd place, bronze medalist(s)	Pornsiri Trachu (THA)	1	2	10
4	Ganchimeg Zundui (MGL)	0	3	0

==== −70 kg ====
December 16

Final
	Score	
Methawadee Chatphueng (THA)	000–100	Li Yu (CHN)
