= Sitting volleyball at the Asian Para Games =

- Current season, competition or edition: Sitting volleyball at the 2022 Asian Para Games
- Sport: Sitting volleyball
- First season: 2010
- Continent: Asia (AVC)
- Most recent champions: M: Iran (4th title); W: China (4th title)
- Most titles: M: Iran (4 titles); W: China (4 titles)

Sitting volleyball has been held at the Asian Para Games since the 2010 edition.

== Men's tournaments ==
=== Summaries ===
Year	Host		Final				Third-place game		
Year	Host		Champion	Score	Second Place		Third Place	Score	Fourth Place
2010; Details	(China); Guangzhou		Iran	3–1	China		Iraq	3–2	South Korea
2014; Details	(South Korea); Incheon		Iran		China		Iraq		
2018; Details	(Indonesia); Jakarta–Palembang		Iran	3–1	China		Kazakhstan	3–0	Iraq
2022; Details	(China); Hangzhou		Iran	3–0	Kazakhstan		China	3–0	South Korea
2026; Details	(Japan); Okazaki	Iran	3–0	Kazakhstan	Iraq	3–1	China		

== Women's tournaments ==
=== Summaries ===
Year	Host	Final			Third-place game		
Year	Host	Champion	Score	Second Place	Third Place	Score	Fourth Place
2010; Details	(China); Guangzhou	China	3–1	Japan	Iran	3–0	Mongolia
2014; Details	(South Korea); Incheon	China		Iran	Japan		
2018; Details	(Indonesia); Jakarta–Palembang	China	3–0	Iran	Japan	3–1	Indonesia
2022; Details	(China); Hangzhou	China	round robin	Iran	Japan	round robin	Thailand

== Medals (2010-2026) ==
Rank	Nation	Gold	Silver	Bronze	Total
1	Iran	5	4	1	10
2	China	5	3	1	9
3	Kazakhstan	0	2	1	3
4	Japan	0	1	4	5
5	Iraq	0	0	3	3
Totals (5 entries)		10	10	10	30

== Medalist ==
=== Medallists from previous Asian Para Games - Men ===
2018 Jakarta (INA) Islamic Republic of Iran (IRI) People's Republic of China (CHN) Kazakhstan (KAZ)

	 	ALIPOUR ALKAMI Meisam	DING Jian	BITEMIROV Yerlan
	 	ALIPOURIAN Davood	DING Xiaochao	DEMEUOV Alexandr Alexandrovich
	 	BABADI Mahdi	JIA You Ming	IZMAGANBETOV Berik Amanakosovich
	 	BEIGDELI Sadegh	JIANG Dong Dong	KARATAYEV Turlan
	 	FARZANEH Hossein	QIAN Xiang Rong	KASKABAYEV Erik Dauletbekovich
	 	GOLESTANI Hossein	WANG Qiang	MANABAYEV Almat
	 	LASHGARI SANAMI Majid	XU Zengbing	MEDEUOV Shyngys
	 	MEHRZADSELAKJANI Morteza	ZHANG Zhongmin	MUKANBETKALIYEV Nurtau Konysuly
	 	NEMATI Mohammad	ZHOU Canming	NAMURATOV Perdebay
	 	SALEHI HAJIKOLAEI Ramzan	 	SARTAYEV Bauyrzhan
	 	SOBHANINIA Mohammadreza	 	SHIKIBAYEV Akylbek
	 	ZIRAHI Isa	 	SUIEUOV Zhangali
	 	 	 	TAKHAUOV Bauyrzhan

2014 Incheon (KOR) Islamic Republic of Iran (IRI) People's Republic of China (CHN) Iraq (IRQ)

	 	ALIPOUR ALKAMI Meisam	DING Xiaochao	ABED Rami
	 	ALIPOURIAN Davood	GAO Hui	ABOHADMA Ahmed
	 	BABADI Mahdi	JIN Heng	AL-ABOD Ahmed
	 	BEIGDELI Sadegh	LI Ji	AL-DUHAIMI Ahmed
	 	EIRI Ahmad	LI Lei	AL-GHURAIBAWI Abbas
	 	GHAREHGHORBAGHI Arash	LI Mingfa	AL-LAMI Mohammed Idan Khalaf
	 	GOLESTANI Hossein	WANG Haidong	DAHASH Ahmed
	 	HAMID ZADEH Mahdi	WANG Shuo	HATTAB Muayad
	 	KHALEGHI Mohammad	ZHANG Zhongmin	JUBOORI Hadi
	 	KHORMALI Arash	ZHOU Canming	KAAB Mahdi
	 	LASHGARI SANAMI Majid	 	 
	 	SALEHI HAJIKOLAEI Ramzan	 	 

2010 Guangzhou (CHN) Islamic Republic of Iran (IRI) People's Republic of China (CHN) Iraq (IRQ)

	 	ALIPOUR ALKAMI Meisam	BAOLIN Liang	AL SHAMMARI Salah
	 	ALIPOURIAN Davood	DING Xiaochao	ALAIBI Naser
	 	EIMERI Jalil	GAO Hui	AL-GHURAIBAWI Abbas
	 	EIRI Ahmad	JIN Heng	AL-SUOANI Ahmed
	 	HASSAN POUR ALINAZARI Naser	LI Lei	AL-UGBI Hussain
	 	KHORMALI Arash	QIU Lin	DAHASH Ahmed
	 	LASHGARI SANAMI Majid	TONG Jiao	HADI Murtadha
	 	MOHARRAM KHANI Abolfazl	WANG Haidong	HATTAB Muayad
	 	RAHIMI Mohammad Reza	WANG Xiaoliang	JUBOORI Hadi
	 	SAJEDINIA Hadi	ZHANG Zhongmin	KAABI Majeed
	 	SALEHI HAJIKOLAEI Ramzan	ZHAO Peiwen	MAJEED Majeed
	 	ZIRAHI Isa	ZHOU Canming	XHAYOON Mahdi

=== Medallists from previous Asian Para Games - Women ===
2018 Jakarta (INA) People's Republic of China (CHN) Islamic Republic of Iran (IRI) Japan (JPN)

	 	GAO Wenwen	DANAYETOUS Zahra	AKAKURA Sachie
	 	GONG Bin	FALLAHI DARYAKENARI Mehri	FUJII Junko
	 	LYU Hongqin	FARHADI Nasrin	HATA Mika
	 	QIU Junfei	HEIDARI Farzaneh	KANEKI Emi
	 	TANG Xuemei	JAFARIAN ARJAS Batoul	KIKUCHI Satoko
	 	WANG Li	JAHANI Fatemeh	NISHIIE Michiyo
	 	WANG Yanan	KHALILZADEH FARSANGI Batoul	OGATA Shiori
	 	ZHANG Lijun	MALEKI DIZICHEH Zeinab	OSADA Mamiko
	 	ZHANG Xufei	NEJATIAREF Zahra	SAITO Yoko
	 	ZHAO Meiling	PANJEHBASHI Neda	SUMITOMO Mikiko
	 	 	SHAJARATI Masoumeh	TANAKA Yukari
	 	 	ZAREI BAROUTI Masoumeh	 

2014 Incheon (KOR) People's Republic of China (CHN) Islamic Republic of Iran (IRI) Japan (JPN)

	 	GONG Bin	ABDI Zahra	AKAKURA Sachie
	 	JIANG Jixiu	DANAYETOUS Zahra	AWANO Sachie
	 	LYU Hongqin	FALLAHI DARYAKENARI Mehri	FUJII Junko
	 	SHENG Yuhong	FARHADI Nasrin	KANEKI Emi
	 	WANG Yanan	JAFARIAN ARJAS Batoul	KIKUCHI Satoko
	 	XU Jie	JAFARIVARDANJANI Tayebeh	NAGAI Keiko
	 	ZHANG Lijun	KESHVARI Sakineh	NISHIIE Michiyo
	 	ZHANG Xufei	KHALEGHI Samira	SAITO Yoko
	 	ZHAO Meiling	MALEKI DIZICHEH Zeinab	SUMITOMO Mikiko
	 	 	NEJATIAREF Zahra	TANAHASHI Yukari
	 	 	NEMATI JEGHEH Roghaiyeh	 
	 	 	ZAREI BAROUTI Masoumeh	 

2010 Guangzhou (CHN) People's Republic of China (CHN) Japan (JPN) Islamic Republic of Iran (IRI)

	 	GAO Wenwen	AWANO Sachie	ABDI Zahra
	 	HAIYAN Zhang	FUJII Junko	ALIGHORCHI Safieh
	 	LI Liping	KANEDA Noriko	AMOUEI Azam
	 	LYU Hongqin	KIKUCHI Satoko	DELKHOSH Zahra
	 	QIU Junfei	KOBATAKE Kimiko	FALLAHI DARYAKENARI Mehri
	 	SHENG Yuhong	NISHIIE Michiyo	FARHADI Nasrin
	 	SU Limei	OKAHIRA Yukari	GOL Zahra
	 	TANG Xuemei	OMURA Shiori	JAFARIVARDANJANI Tayebeh
	 	YANG Yanling	OSADA Mamiko	KESHVARI Sakineh
	 	ZHANG Lijun	SAITO Yoko	KORDESTANI Eshrat
	 	ZHANG Xufei	SAKAMOTO Harumi	MALEKI DIZICHEH Zeinab
	 	ZHENG Xiongying	 	ZAREI BAROUTI Masoumeh
