= Swimming at the 2008 Summer Paralympics – Men's 100 metre backstroke S7 =

Men's 100m Backstroke S7 at the XIII Paralympic Games
- Venue: Beijing National Aquatics Center
- Dates: 10 September
- Competitors: 12 from 10 nations
- Winning time: 1:12.09

Medalists
1st place, gold medalist(s)		Lantz Lamback	United States
2nd place, silver medalist(s)		Jon Fox	Great Britain
3rd place, bronze medalist(s)		Guillermo Marro	Argentina

The men's 100m backstroke S7 event at the 2008 Summer Paralympics took place at the Beijing National Aquatics Center on 10 September. There were two heats; the swimmers with the eight fastest times advanced to the final.

== Results ==
=== Heats ===
Competed from 09:26.

==== Heat 1 ====
Rank	Name	Nationality	Time	Notes
1	Guillermo Marro	Argentina	1:15.73	Q
2	Dejan Fabcic	Slovenia	1:17.19	Q
3	Gao Nan	China	1:18.01	Q
4	Ma Fei	China	1:18.10	Q
5	Kevin Lambrechts	Belgium	1:20.50	
6	Nikita Shevchenko	Russia	1:24.86	

==== Heat 2 ====
Rank	Name	Nationality	Time	Notes
1	Lantz Lamback	United States	1:14.06	Q, WR
2	Jon Fox	Great Britain	1:14.78	Q
3	Andrew Lindsay	Great Britain	1:16.75	Q
4	Daisuke Ejima	Japan	1:17.12	Q
5	Nikolaos Tsotras	Greece	1:21.52	
6	Jay Dohnt	Australia	1:24.88	

=== Final ===
Competed at 17:37.

Rank	Name	Nationality	Time	Notes
1st place, gold medalist(s)	Lantz Lamback	United States	1:12.09	WR
2nd place, silver medalist(s)	Jon Fox	Great Britain	1:14.34	
3rd place, bronze medalist(s)	Guillermo Marro	Argentina	1:15.17	
4	Andrew Lindsay	Great Britain	1:15.99	
5	Daisuke Ejima	Japan	1:16.42	
6	Gao Nan	China	1:17.34	
7	Ma Fei	China	1:18.03	
8	Dejan Fabcic	Slovenia	1:18.41	

Q = qualified for final. WR = World Record.
