= India at the 2010 Asian Para Games =

- IOC code: IND
- NPC: Paralympic Committee of India
- Website: paralympicindia.org.in

in Guangzhou 12–19 December 2010
- Competitors: 102 (15 women and 87 men) in 9 sports
- Medals Ranked 15th: Gold 1 Silver 4 Bronze 9 Total 14

Asian Para Games appearances (overview)
- 2010; 2014; 2018; 2022

India sent its athletes to participate in the 2010 Asian Para Games—First Asian Para Games, a parallel multi-sport event with 2010 Asian Games for Asian athletes with a physical disability, held two weeks after the conclusion of the Asian Games in Guangzhou, China from 13 to 19 December 2010.

Indian delegation included—15 women and 87 men—total 102 athletes, participated in nine different sports. The athletics contingent was the largest, with 42 athletes—3 women and 39 men. Indian athletes won total 14 overall medals, with one gold and finished at the fifteenth spot in a medal table.

== Competitors ==
Sport	Men	Women	Total
Archery	5	0	5
Athletics	39	3	42
Badminton	12	1	13
Powerlifting	7	4	11
Shooting	4	0	4
Swimming	8	2	10
Table tennis	4	3	7
Wheelchair fencing	6	2	8
Wheelchair tennis	2	0	2
Total	87	15	102

== Medalists ==
Medal	Name	Sport	Event
Gold	Jagseer Singh	Athletics	Men's Triple jump F46
Silver	Ramkiaran Singh	Athletics	Men's 800 m T13
Silver	Amit Kumar	Athletics	Men's Discus throw F51–53
Silver	Jagseer Singh	Athletics	Men's Long jump F46
Silver	Sandeep Singh Maan	Athletics	Men's 400 m T46
Bronze	Balwan Singh	Athletics	Men's 100 m T42
Bronze	Deepa Malik	Athletics	Women's Javelin throw F33/34/52/53
Bronze	Parul Parmar	Badminton	BMSTL3
Bronze	Farman Basha	Powerlifting	-48 kg
Bronze	Nooruddin Shaik Dawood	Wheelchair fencing	Individual Sabre Category B
