= Badminton at the 2010 Asian Para Games =

Badminton at the 2010 Asian Para Games were held in Tianhe Gymnasium from December 13 to December 18. There were 13 gold medals in this sport.

== Medal summary ==
=== Medal table ===
Retrieved from Asian Para Games 2010 Official Website.

Rank	Nation	Gold	Silver	Bronze	Total
1	Malaysia (MAS)	3	1	4	8
2	China (CHN)	2	3	1	6
3	South Korea (KOR)	2	2	0	4
4	Vietnam (VIE)	2	0	1	3
5	Indonesia (INA)	1	4	1	6
6	Thailand (THA)	1	1	2	4
7	Japan (JPN)	1	0	2	3
8	Hong Kong (HKG)	1	0	0	1
9	Chinese Taipei (TPE)	0	1	0	1
9	Sri Lanka (SRI)	0	1	0	1
11	India (IND)	0	0	1	1
Totals (11 entries)		13	13	12	38

=== Events ===
Event	Class	Gold	Silver	Bronze
Men's singles	BMSTL1	Hoang Pham Thang; Vietnam	Tian Shiwei; China	Radhi Juhari; Malaysia
Men's singles	BMSTL2	Pham Duc Trung; Vietnam	Dwiyoko; Indonesia	Loi Lang Yean; Malaysia
Men's singles	BMSTL3	Yu Kwong Wah; Hong Kong	Hary Susanto; Indonesia	Bakri Omar; Malaysia
Men's singles	BMSTU4	Zhu Peiqiang; China	Upul Gamagedara; Sri Lanka	Tetsuo Ura; Japan
Men's singles	BMSTU5	Cheah Liek Hou; Malaysia	Suryo Nugroho; Indonesia	Ryan Yohwari; Indonesia
Men's singles	BMW2	Lee Sam-Seop; South Korea	Choi Jung-Man; South Korea	Osamu Nagashima; Japan
Men's singles	BMW3	Shim Jae-Yul; South Korea	Madzlan Saibon; Malaysia	Truong Ngoc Binh; Vietnam
Men's doubles	BMSTL1-3	Hary Susanto and Trihono; Indonesia	Chiang Chung Hou and Lin Cheng Che; Chinese Taipei	Hairulfozi Saaba and Mohd Zambri Yusof; Malaysia
Men's doubles	BMSTU4-5	Cheah Liek Hou and Suhaili Laiman; Malaysia	Dwiyoko and Ryan Yohwari; Indonesia	Chen Kunxiong and Zhu Peiqiang; China
Women's singles	BMSTL2	Nabilah Ahmat Sharif; Malaysia	Wandee Kamtam; Thailand	
Women's singles	BMSTL3	Ma Huihui; China	Wang Songye; China	Parul Parmar; India
Women's singles	BMSTU5	Ayako Suzuki; Japan	Chen Xinyun; China	Sudsaifon Yodpa; Thailand
Women's singles	BMW3	Amnouy Wetwithan; Thailand	Lee Sun-Ae; South Korea	Sujirat Pookkham; Thailand

== Results ==
=== Men's singles - BMSTL1 ===
Round of 16; December 13
1	Pramod Bhagat (IND)
Radhi Juhari (MAS)
B. Wongkhamkhruea (THA)
Tian Shiwei (CHN)	21	21
Takayuki Taniguchi (JPN)	9	11
Ye Jianhao (CHN)	14	16
Rao Dillashwar (IND)	21	21
Hoang Pham Thang (VIE)
Tsang Chiu Pong (HKG)
2	Subpong Meepian (THA)

Quarterfinal; December 14
1	Pramod Bhagat (IND)	21	11	14
Radhi Juhari (MAS)	18	21	21
B. Wongkhamkhruea (THA)	6	7
Tian Shiwei (CHN)	21	21
Rao Dillashwar (IND)	12	7
Hoang Pham Thang (VIE)	21	21
Tsang Chiu Pong (HKG)	10	10
2	Subpong Meepian (THA)	21	21

Semifinal; December 14
Radhi Juhari (MAS)	8	21	12
Tian Shiwei (CHN)	21	14	21
Hoang Pham Thang (VIE)	21	7	21
2	Subpong Meepian (THA)	16	21	8

Final; December 15
Tian Shiwei (CHN)	19	9
Hoang Pham Thang (VIE)	21	21

Bronze Medal Match – December 15
	Score		Game 1	Game 2	Game 3
Radhi Juhari (MAS)	2–1	Subpong Meepian (THA)	12–21	21–11	21–12

=== Men's singles - BMSTL2 ===
Round of 16; December 13
1	Kim Chang-Man (KOR)
Yusuke Yamaguchi (JPN)	6	9
Dwiyoko Dwiyoko (INA)	21	21
3	Hsu Jen-Ho (TPE)
Ma Xutao (CHN)	16	21	21
Amarendra Behera (IND)	21	8	17
Samudrala Raghuram (IND)	10	7
Pham Duc Trung (VIE)	21	21
Huang Hsing-Chih (TPE)	21	21
4	Peter Lo (HKG)	9	8
Chen Xiaoyu (CHN)	11	21	16
Loi Lang Yean (MAS)	21	14	21
2	Toshiaki Suenaga (JPN)

Quarterfinal; December 13
1	Kim Chang-Man (KOR)	18	21	16
Dwiyoko Dwiyoko (INA)	21	15	21
3	Hsu Jen-Ho (TPE)	18	21	10
Ma Xutao (CHN)	21	19	21
Pham Duc Trung (VIE)	21	21
Huang Hsing-Chih (TPE)	13	9
Loi Lang Yean (MAS)	21	21
2	Toshiaki Suenaga (JPN)	14	19

Semifinal; December 14
Dwiyoko (INA)	21	22
Ma Xutao (CHN)	15	20
Pham Duc Trung (VIE)	21	21
Loi Lang Yean (MAS)	9	10

Final; December 15
Dwiyoko Dwiyoko (INA)	12	22	9
Pham Duc Trung (VIE)	21	20	21

Bronze Medal Match – December 15
	Score		Game 1	Game 2	Game 3
Ma Xutao (CHN)	Ret.	Loi Lang Yean (MAS)	21–19	14–21	0–3

=== Men's singles - BMSTL3 ===
Round of 32 – December 13
	Score		Game 1	Game 2	Game 3
Taku Hiroi (JPN)	0–2	Trihono (INA)	19–21	12–21	
Hary Susanto (INA)	2–0	Chung Siu Hung Tom (HKG)	21–5	21–9	
Bakri Omar (MAS)	2–0	Chiang Chung-Hou (TPE)	21–12	21–11	

Round of 16; December 13
1	Yu Kwong Wah (HKG)	21	21
Lalith Wathuhena (SRI)	9	13
Ashutosh Dubey (THA)	19	13
Nguyen van Thuong (VIE)	21	21
3	Lin Cheng-Che (TPE)	21	21
Shahria Shamim (BAN)	5	7
Hamizan Muhamed (MAS)	10	16
Trihono (INA)	21	21
Hary Susanto (INA)	21	21
Kim Jae-hoon (KOR)	12	8
Vo Minh Hai (VIE)	21	21
4	Deepal Lekam (SRI)	7	10
Bakri Omar (MAS)	21	21
Yugo Mitsuhashi (JPN)	8	10
Wu Min (CHN)	19	21	12
2	A. Saengarayakul (THA)	21	16	21

Quarterfinal; December 14
1	Yu Kwong Wah (HKG)	21	21
Nguyen van Thuong (VIE)	11	8
3	Lin Cheng-Che (TPE)	21	21
Trihono (INA)	14	5
Hary Susanto (INA)	21	21
Vo Minh Hai (VIE)	10	14
Bakri Omar (MAS)	21	14	21
2	A. Saengarayakul (THA)	7	21	15

Semifinal; December 14
1	Yu Kwong Wah (HKG)	21	21
3	Lin Cheng-Che (TPE)	10	13
Hary Susanto (INA)	20	21	21
Bakri Omar (MAS)	22	19	12

Final; December 15
1	Yu Kwong Wah (HKG)	21	21
Hary Susanto (INA)	15	10

Bronze Medal Match – December 15
	Score		Game 1	Game 2	Game 3
Lin Cheng-Che (TPE)	1–2	Bakri Omar (MAS)	21–16	19–21	15–21

=== Men's singles - BMSTU4 ===
Round of 16; December 14
1	Wong Shu Yuen (HKG)
Tay Wei Ming (SIN)	11	15
Zhu Peiqiang (CHN)	21	21
4	Tetsuo Ura (JPN)	21	21
Md Noor Mdisa (MAS)	7	4
Sanjeevaiah Talari (IND)	13	4
Nguyen van Tai (VIE)	21	21
Feng Zonghai (CHN)	14	21	21
Tran Minh Nhuan (VIE)	21	16	23
Yoshiaki Mori (JPN)	16	15
3	Lam Tak Kwan (HKG)	21	21
T. Koawboonyarasri (THA)	16	21	21
Satyam Janapareddi (IND)	21	19	18
2	Upul B. Gamagedara (SRI)

Quarterfinal; December 16
1	Wong Shu Yuen (HKG)	13	9
Zhu Peiqiang (CHN)	21	21
4	Tetsuo Ura (JPN)	21	21
Nguyen van Tai (VIE)	13	11
Tran Minh Nhuan (VIE)	21	21
3	Lam Tak Kwan (HKG)	15	14
T. Koawboonyarasri (THA)	15	14
2	Upul B. Gamagedara (SRI)	21	21

Semifinal; December 17
Zhu Peiqiang (CHN)	21	21
4	Tetsuo Ura (JPN)	19	13
Tran Minh Nhuan (VIE)	21	16
2	Upul B. Gamagedara (SRI)	23	21

Final; December 18
Zhu Peiqiang (CHN)	21	21
2	Upul B. Gamagedara (SRI)	12	9

Bronze Medal Match – December 17
	Score		Game 1	Game 2	Game 3
Tetsuo Ura (JPN)	Ret.	Tran Minh Nhuan (VIE)			

=== Men's singles - BMSTU5 ===
Round of 16; December 14
1	Rajkumar P. (IND)
Choi Su-Man (KOR)	10	8
Cheah Liek Hou (MAS)	21	21
Chan Cho Leung (HKG)
Ryan Yohwari (INA)	21	21
Cai Jinghao (CHN)	12	16
Kim Gi-Yeon (KOR)	20	21	18
Hu Shigui (CHN)	22	17	21
Zee Jeffrey Jamin (HKG)	14	16
Suryo Nugroho (INA)	21	21
Rakesh Pandy (IND)	21	21
Hironobu Kawabata (JPN)	19	14
2	Lee Meng-Yuan (TPE)

Quarterfinal; December 16
1	Rajkumar P. (IND)	7	16
Cheah Liek Hou (MAS)	21	21
Chan Cho Leung (HKG)	16	14
Ryan Yohwari (INA)	21	21
Hu Shigui (CHN)	11	10
Suryo Nugroho (INA)	21	21
Rakesh Pandy (IND)	19	14
2	Lee Meng-Yuan (TPE)	21	21

Semifinal; December 17
Cheah Liek Hou (MAS)	21	21
4	Ryan Yohwari (INA)	11	6
Suryo Nugroho (INA)	21	21
2	Lee Meng-Yuan (TPE)	13	9

Final; December 18
Cheah Liek Hou (MAS)	21	21
2	Suryo Nugroho (INA)	8	10

Bronze Medal Match – December 17
	Score		Game 1	Game 2	Game 3
Ryan Yohwari (INA)	2–0	Lee Meng-Yuan (TPE)	21–6	21–11	

=== Men's singles - BMW2 ===
Round of 16; December 13
1	Lee Sam-Seop (KOR)
Satya Prakash Tiwari (IND)	3	10
C. Kornpeekanok (THA)	21	21
Zulkafli Shaari (MAS)
Tsutomu Shimada (JPN)	16	21	21
Tran Mai Anh (VIE)	21	10	18
Choi Jung-Man (KOR)	21	21
Ho Su Weng (MAC)	1	2
Anjana Vannela (IND)
K. Weerasingha (SRI)	15	16
Anuwat Sriboran (THA)	21	21
2	Osamu Nagashima (JPN)

Quarterfinal; December 14
1	Lee Sam-Seop (KOR)	21	21
C. Kornpeekanok (THA)	9	9
Zulkafli Shaari (MAS)	21	21
Tsutomu Shimada (JPN)	18	9
Choi Jung-Man (KOR)	21	21
Anjana Vannela (IND)	6	6
Anuwat Sriboran (THA)	19	11
2	Osamu Nagashima (JPN)	21	21

Semifinal; December 14
1	Lee Sam-Seop (KOR)	21	21
Zulkafli Shaari (MAS)	7	5
Choi Jung-Man (KOR)	21	21
2	Osamu Nagashima (JPN)	14	12

Final; December 15
1	Lee Sam-Seop (KOR)	21	22	21
Choi Jung-Man (KOR)	7	24	12

Bronze Medal Match – December 15
	Score		Game 1	Game 2	Game 3
Zulkafli Mohd Shaari (MAS)	0–2	Osamu Nagashima (JPN)	14–21	13–21	

=== Men's singles - BMW3 ===
Round of 16; December 14
1	Shim Jae-Yul (KOR)
Zarim Marzuki (MAS)	19	21	17
Dumnern Junthong (THA)	21	16	21
Chan Ho Yuen (HKG)	21	21
Munidasa Walimunige (SRI)	15	14
Hiroki Fujino (JPN)	21	21
Ao Chi Meng (MAC)	15	17
Ip Chi Keong (MAC)	9	5
Mai Jianpeng (CHN)	21	21
Madzlan Saibon (MAS)	21	21
An Gyeong-Hwan (KOR)	17	18
Sanjeev Kumar (IND)	1	3
Truong Ngoc Binh (VIE)	21	21
Seiji Yamami (JPN)	15	13
2	Jakarin Homhual (THA)	21	21

Quarterfinal; December 16
1	Shim Jae-Yul (KOR)	21	21
Dumnern Junthong (THA)	8	15
Chan Ho Yuen (HKG)	21	21
Hiroki Fujino (JPN)	4	6
Mai Jianpeng (CHN)	9	8
Madzlan Saibon (MAS)	21	21
Truong Ngoc Binh (VIE)	21	21
2	Jakarin Homhual (THA)	18	13

Semifinal; December 17
1	Shim Jae-Yul (KOR)	21	21
Chan Ho Yuen (HKG)	4	14
Madzlan Saibon (MAS)	24	18	21
Truong Ngoc Binh (VIE)	22	21	17

Final; December 18
1	Shim Jae-Yul (KOR)	21	21
Madzlan Saibon (MAS)	13	17

Bronze Medal Match – December 17
	Score		Game 1	Game 2	Game 3
Chan Ho Yuen (HKG)	0–2	Truong Ngoc Binh (VIE)	12–21	14–21	

=== Men's doubles - BMSTL1-3 ===
Round of 16; December 16
Yugo Mitsuhashi (JPN); Toshiaki Suenaga (JPN)
Hairulfozi Saaba (MAS); Mohd Zambri Yusof (MAS)
Chiang Chung-Hou (TPE); Lin Cheng-Che (TPE)
Amarendra Behera (IND); Ashutosh Dubey (IND)	14	22
Nguyen van Thuong (VIE); Vo Minh Hai (VIE)	21	24
Kim Chang-Man (KOR); Kim Jae-hoon (KOR)	10	8
Hary Susnato (INA); Trihono Trihono (INA)	21	21
Lee Yan Ping Patrick (HKG); Li Tak Ping (HKG)
Chen Xiaoyu (CHN); Tian Shiwei (CHN)	13	13
Subpong Meepian (THA); A. Saengarayakul (THA)	21	21
Deepal Lekam (SRI); Lalith Wathuhena (SRI)

Quarterfinal; December 16
Yugo Mitsuhashi (JPN); Toshiaki Suenaga (JPN)	14	9
Hairulfozi Saaba (MAS); Mohd Zambri Yusof (MAS)	21	21
Chiang Chung-Hou (TPE); Lin Cheng-Che (TPE)	21	21
Nguyen van Thuong (VIE); Vo Minh Hai (VIE)	11	17
Hary Susnato (INA); Trihono Trihono (INA)	21	21
Lee Yan Ping Patrick (HKG); Li Tak Ping (HKG)	6	6
Subpong Meepian (THA); A. Saengarayakul (THA)	21	19	21
Deepal Lekam (SRI); Lalith Wathuhena (SRI)	15	21	7

Semifinal; December 17
Hairulfozi Saaba (MAS); Mohd Zambri Yusof (MAS)	19	9
Chiang Chung-Hou (TPE); Lin Cheng-Che (TPE)	21	21
Hary Susnato (INA); Trihono Trihono (INA)	21	21
Subpong Meepian (THA); A. Saengarayakul (THA)	9	6

Final; December 18
1	Chiang Chung-Hou (TPE); Lin Cheng-Che (TPE)	17	12
Hary Susnato (INA); Trihono Trihono (INA)	21	21

Bronze Medal Match – December 17
	Score		Game 1	Game 2	Game 3
Hairulfozi Saaba (MAS); Mohd Zambri Yusof (MAS)	2–0	Subpong Meepian (THA); Adisak Saengarayakul (THA)	21–9	21–12	

=== Men's doubles - BMSTU4-5 ===
Round of 16; December 16
Chan Cho Leung (HKG); Lam Tak Kwan (HKG)
Cheah Liek Hou (MAS); Suhaili Laiman (MAS)
Nguyen van Tai (VIE); Tran Minh Nhuan (VIE)
Yoshiaki Mori (JPN); Tetsuo Ura (JPN)
Choi Su-Man (KOR); KIM Gi-Yeon (KOR)	12	14
Dwiyoko (INA); Ryan Yohwari (INA)	21	21
Lee Meng-Yuan (TPE); Lin Tienjen (TPE)
Zhu Peiqiang (CHN); Chen Kunxiong (CHN)
Satyam Janapareddi (IND); Rajkumar P. (IND)

Quarterfinal; December 16
Chan Cho Leung (HKG); Lam Tak Kwan (HKG)	17	13
Cheah Liek Hou (MAS); Suhaili Laiman (MAS)	21	21
Nguyen van Tai (VIE); Tran Minh Nhuan (VIE)	10	7
Yoshiaki Mori (JPN); Tetsuo Ura (JPN)	21	21
Dwiyoko (INA); Ryan Yohwari (INA)	21	21
Lee Meng-Yuan (TPE); Lin Tienjen (TPE)	17	16
Zhu Peiqiang (CHN); Chen Kunxiong (CHN)	21	19	21
Satyam Janapareddi (IND); Rajkumar P. (IND)	14	21	17

Semifinal; December 17
Cheah Liek Hou (MAS); Suhaili Laiman (MAS)	21	21
Yoshiaki Mori (JPN); Tetsuo Ura (JPN)	15	17
Dwiyoko (INA); Ryan Yohwari (INA)	24	9	22
Zhu Peiqiang (CHN); Chen Kunxiong (CHN)	22	21	20

Final; December 18
1	Cheah Liek Hou (MAS); Suhaili Laiman (MAS)	21	21
Dwiyoko (INA); Ryan Yohwari (INA)	8	7

Bronze Medal Match – December 17
	Score		Game 1	Game 2	Game 3
Yoshiaki Mori (JPN); Tetsuo Ura (JPN)	1–2	Zhu Peiqiang (CHN); Chen Kunxiong (CHN)	15–21	21–15	17–21

=== Women's singles - BMSTL2 ===
Round Robin – December 16 to 18
	Score		Game 1	Game 2	Game 3
Heo Sun-Hee (KOR)	0–2	Nabilah Ahmat Sharif (MAS)	17–21	19–21	
Nabilah Ahmat Sharif (MAS)	2–0	Wandee Kamtam (THA)	21–13	21–14	
Wandee Kamtam (THA)	2–0	Heo Sun-Hee (KOR)	21–15	21–12	

Rank	Athlete	W	L	Games W/L	Points W/L
1st place, gold medalist(s)	Nabilah Ahmat Sharif (MAS)	2	0	4 / 0	84 / 63
2nd place, silver medalist(s)	Wandee Kamtam (THA)	1	1	2 / 2	69 / 69
3	Heo Sun-Hee (KOR)	0	2	0 / 4	63 / 84

=== Women's singles - BMSTL3 ===
Quarterfinals
1	Ma Huihui (CHN)	21	21
Nor Azlin Sulaiman (MAS)	16	9
Yuko Yamaguchi (JPN)	21	21
Chanida Srinavakul (THA)	13	11
Nipada Saensupa (THA)	21	17	12
Parul Parmar (IND)	17	21	21
Aki Takahashi (JPN)	7	9
2	Wang Songye (CHN)	21	21

Semifinals
1	Ma Huihui (CHN)	21	21
Yuko Yamaguchi (JPN)	10	13
Parul Parmar (IND)	13	17
2	Wang Songye (CHN)	21	21

Final
1	Ma Huihui (CHN)	22	21
2	Wang Songye (CHN)	20	14
Bronze Medal Match
Yuko Yamaguchi (JPN)	17	11
Parul Parmar (IND)	21	21

=== Women's singles - BMSTU5 ===
Round Robin – December 16 to 18
	Score		Game 1	Game 2	Game 3
Chen Xinyun (CHN)	2–0	Su Kunrong (CHN)	21–12	21–12	
Ayako Suzuki (JPN)	2–0	Sudsaifon Yodpa (THA)	21–6	21–0	
Chen Xinyun (CHN)	2–0	Sudsaifon Yodpa (THA)	21–15	21–7	
Nor Fariha Kamarudin (MAS)	0–2	Su Kunrong (CHN)	11–21	11–21	
Chen Xinyun (CHN)	2–0	Nor Fariha Kamarudin (MAS)	21–6	21–4	
Ayako Suzuki (JPN)	2–0	Su Kunrong (CHN)	21–9	21–5	
Ayako Suzuki (JPN)	2–0 (Ret)	Nor Fariha Kamarudin (MAS)			
Sudsaifon Yodpa (THA)	2–1	Su Kunrong (CHN)	21–12	12–21	24–22
Chen Xinyun (CHN)	0–2	Ayako Suzuki (JPN)	11–21	13–21	
Nor Fariha Kamarudin (MAS)	0–2 (Ret)	Sudsaifon Yodpa (THA)			

Rank	Athlete	W	L	Games W/L	Points W/L
1st place, gold medalist(s)	Ayako Suzuki (JPN)	4	0	8 / 0	126 / 44
2nd place, silver medalist(s)	Chen Xinyun (CHN)	3	1	6 / 2	150 / 98
3rd place, bronze medalist(s)	Sudsaifon Yodpa (THA)	2	2	4 / 5	85 / 139
4	Su Kunrong (CHN)	1	3	3 / 6	135 / 163
5	Nor Fariha Kamarudin (MAS)	0	4	0 / 8	32 / 84

=== Women's singles - BMW3 ===
Round Robin – December 14 to 15
	Score		Game 1	Game 2	Game 3
Amnouy Wetwithan (THA)	2–0	Sujirat Pookkham (THA)	21–9	21–12	
Lee Sun-Ae (KOR)	2–0	Yoko Egami (JPN)	21–8	21–6	
Amnouy Wetwithan (THA)	2–0	Yoko Egami (JPN)	21–8	21–5	
Lee Sun-Ae (KOR)	2–0	Sujirat Pookkham (THA)	21–19	21–10	
Amnouy Wetwithan (THA)	2–0	Lee Sun-Ae (KOR)	21–18	21–17	
Yoko Egami (JPN)	0–2	Sujirat Pookkham (THA)	6–21	8–21	

Rank	Athlete	W	L	Games W/L	Points W/L
1st place, gold medalist(s)	Amnouy Wetwithan (THA)	3	0	6 / 0	126 / 69
2nd place, silver medalist(s)	Lee Sun-Ae (KOR)	2	1	4 / 2	119 / 85
3rd place, bronze medalist(s)	Sujirat Pookkham (THA)	1	2	2 / 4	92 / 98
4	Yoko Egami (JPN)	0	3	0 / 6	41 / 126
