= Wheelchair fencing at the 2010 Asian Para Games =

Wheelchair fencing at the 2010 Asian Para Games was held in Guangda Gymnasium, Guangzhou, China from December 14 to 16, 2010.

== Medal summary ==
=== Medal table ===
Retrieved from Asian Para Games 2010 Official Website.

| Rank | Nation | Gold | Silver | Bronze | Total |
|---|---|---|---|---|---|
| 1 | China (CHN) | 7 | 5 | 7 | 19 |
| 2 | Hong Kong (HKG) | 3 | 6 | 7 | 16 |
| 3 | Thailand (THA) | 1 | 0 | 3 | 4 |
| 4 | Iraq (IRQ) | 1 | 0 | 0 | 1 |
| 5 | South Korea (KOR) | 0 | 1 | 1 | 2 |
| 6 | Kuwait (KUW) | 0 | 0 | 2 | 2 |
| 7 | India (IND) | 0 | 0 | 1 | 1 |
| 7 | Malaysia (MAS) | 0 | 0 | 1 | 1 |
| Totals (8 entries) | | 12 | 12 | 22 | 46 |

=== Medalists ===
==== Men ====
| Event | Gold | Silver | Bronze |
|---|---|---|---|
| Individual Épée; Category A | Tian Jianquan; China | Duan Yanfei; China | Korakod Sangsawang; Thailand |
| Individual Épée; Category A | Tian Jianquan; China | Duan Yanfei; China | Zhang Lei; China |
| Individual Épée; Category B | Ammar Ali; Iraq | Chung Ting Ching; Hong Kong | Abdulwahab El-Saedi; Kuwait |
| Individual Épée; Category B | Ammar Ali; Iraq | Chung Ting Ching; Hong Kong | Tam Chik Sum; Hong Kong |
| Individual Foil; Category A | Zhang Lei; China | Ye Ruyi; China | Chan Wing Kin; Hong Kong |
| Individual Foil; Category A | Zhang Lei; China | Ye Ruyi; China | Duan Yanfei; China |
| Individual Foil; Category B | Hu Daoliang; China | Chung Ting Ching; Hong Kong | Ding Baozhong; China |
| Individual Foil; Category B | Hu Daoliang; China | Chung Ting Ching; Hong Kong | Hui Charn Hung; Hong Kong |
| Individual Sabre; Category A | Tian Jianquan; China | Chan Wing Kin; Hong Kong | Mohd Zamrin Kassim; Malaysia |
| Individual Sabre; Category A | Tian Jianquan; China | Chan Wing Kin; Hong Kong | Ye Ruyi; China |
| Individual Sabre; Category B | Hui Charn Hung; Hong Kong | Tam Chik Sum; Hong Kong | Nooruddin Shaik Dawood; India |
| Individual Sabre; Category B | Hui Charn Hung; Hong Kong | Tam Chik Sum; Hong Kong | Cha-On Sukto; Thailand |
| Team Foil | China (CHN); Duan Yanfei; Hu Daoliang; Ye Ruyi; Zhang Lei | Hong Kong (HKG); Chan Wing Kin; Chung Ting Ching; Hui Charn Hung; Wong Tang Tat | South Korea (KOR); Cho Yeong-Rae; Jang Dong-Shin; Kim Gi-Hong; Park In-Su |
| Team Foil | China (CHN); Duan Yanfei; Hu Daoliang; Ye Ruyi; Zhang Lei | Hong Kong (HKG); Chan Wing Kin; Chung Ting Ching; Hui Charn Hung; Wong Tang Tat | Kuwait (KUW); Abdullah Al-Haddad; Humoud Al-Radan; Abdulwahab El-Saedi |

==== Women ====
| Event | Gold | Silver | Bronze |
|---|---|---|---|
| Individual Épée; Category A | Yu Chui Yee; Hong Kong | Kim Sun-Mi; South Korea | Fan Pui Shan; Hong Kong |
| Individual Épée; Category A | Yu Chui Yee; Hong Kong | Kim Sun-Mi; South Korea | Rong Jing; China |
| Individual Épée; Category B | Saysunee Jana; Thailand | Yao Fang; China | Chan Yui Chong; Hong Kong |
| Individual Épée; Category B | Saysunee Jana; Thailand | Yao Fang; China | Ye Hua; China |
| Individual Foil; Category A | Rong Jing; China | Wu Baili; China | Fan Pui Shan; Hong Kong |
| Individual Foil; Category A | Rong Jing; China | Wu Baili; China | Yu Chui Yee; Hong Kong |
| Individual Foil; Category B | Chan Yui Chong; Hong Kong | Yao Fang; China | Saysunee Jana; Thailand |
| Individual Foil; Category B | Chan Yui Chong; Hong Kong | Yao Fang; China | Ye Hua; China |
| Team Épée | China (CHN); Rong Jing; Wu Baili; Yao Fang; Ye Hua | Hong Kong (HKG); Chan Yui Chong; Fan Pui Shan; Ng Justine Charissa; Yu Chui Yee | No awarded |
