= Bowling at the 2010 Asian Para Games =

Bowling at the 2010 Asian Para Games was held in Tianhe Bowling Hall, Guangzhou, China from December 14 to 16, 2010.

== Medal summary ==
=== Medal table ===
Retrieved from Asian Para Games 2010 Official Website.

| Rank | Nation | Gold | Silver | Bronze | Total |
|---|---|---|---|---|---|
| 1 | South Korea (KOR) | 5 | 4 | 1 | 10 |
| 2 | Chinese Taipei (TPE) | 2 | 2 | 4 | 8 |
| 3 | Malaysia (MAS) | 2 | 2 | 3 | 7 |
| 4 | Hong Kong (HKG) | 1 | 0 | 0 | 1 |
| 5 | Japan (JPN) | 0 | 2 | 0 | 2 |
| 6 | Singapore (SIN) | 0 | 0 | 2 | 2 |
| 7 | Thailand (THA) | 0 | 0 | 1 | 1 |
| Totals (7 entries) | | 10 | 10 | 11 | 31 |

=== Medalists ===
| Event | Gold | Silver | Bronze |
|---|---|---|---|
| Singles TPB1 | Kim Jung-Hoon; South Korea | Toshiaki Aomatsu; Japan | Krisada Krietkongtawee; Thailand |
| Singles TPB2 | Wan Hon Yin; Hong Kong | Kim Nam-Hun; South Korea | Choo Kam Chan; Malaysia |
| Singles TPB3 | Huang Yu Hsiao; Chinese Taipei | Soo Choon Hung; Malaysia | Muhamad Suhaili Hamid; Malaysia |
| Singles TPB8 | Park Jae-Chul; South Korea | Huang Jen Jung; Chinese Taipei | Lee Chia Chieh; Chinese Taipei |
| Singles TPB9 | Yang Meng Chang; Chinese Taipei | Wong Kee Soon; Malaysia | Lee Seok-Jae; South Korea |
| Singles TPB10 | Song Ki-Soo; South Korea | Kim Chang-Nyeon; South Korea | Woon Wai Ping; Malaysia |
| Doubles TPB1+TPB3 | South Korea (KOR); Kim Jung-Hoon; Seo Min-Seok | Japan (JPN); Toshiaki Aomatsu; Akiko Morisawa | Singapore (SIN); Mohamed Ismail Hussain; Yong Phen Chong Thomas |
| Doubles TPB2+TPB2 | Malaysia (MAS); Choo Kam Chan; Ku Izham Ku Harun | South Korea (KOR); Do Hak-Gil; Kim Nam-Hun | Singapore (SIN); Ke Ming Shuo; Shieh Tsung Han |
| Doubles TPB8+TPB10 | South Korea (KOR); Park Jae-Chul; Song Ki-Soo | Chinese Taipei (TPE); Huang Jen Jung; Lu Ju Huang | Singapore (SIN); Mohammad Taufik Ahmadini; Tan Swang Hee |
| Doubles TPB8+TPB10 | South Korea (KOR); Park Jae-Chul; Song Ki-Soo | Chinese Taipei (TPE); Huang Jen Jung; Lu Ju Huang | Chinese Taipei (TPE); Chang Hui Min; Lee Chia Chieh |
| Doubles TPB9+TPB9 | Malaysia (MAS); Nyat Abu Bakar; Wong Kee Soon | South Korea (KOR); Lee Seok-Jae; Min Jin-Ho | Chinese Taipei (TPE); Lai Fou Hwan; Yang Meng Chang |

== Results ==
=== Singles TPB1 ===
December 14

| Rank | Athlete | Score |
|---|---|---|
| 1st place, gold medalist(s) | Kim Jung-Hoon (KOR) | 957 |
| 2nd place, silver medalist(s) | Toshiaki Aomatsu (JPN) | 832 |
| 3rd place, bronze medalist(s) | Krisada Krietkongtawee (THA) | 812 |
| 4 | Yong Phen Chong Thomas (SIN) | 783 |
| 5 | Mohd Suhairi Abdul Kadir (MAS) | 663 |
| 6 | Liao Hung Tsang (TPE) | 639 |
| 7 | Tamami Emura (JPN) | 637 |
| 8 | Muhamad Hairul Miran (MAS) | 630 |

=== Singles TPB2 ===
December 14

| Rank | Athlete | Score |
|---|---|---|
| 1st place, gold medalist(s) | Wan Hon Yin (HKG) | 1292 |
| 2nd place, silver medalist(s) | Kim Nam-Hun (KOR) | 1188 |
| 3rd place, bronze medalist(s) | Choo Kam Chan (MAS) | 1126 |
| 4 | Ke Ming Shuo (TPE) | 1125 |
| 5 | Ku Izham Ku Harun (MAS) | 1090 |
| 6 | Shieh Tsung Han (TPE) | 1089 |
| 7 | Kozo Kimura (JPN) | 1083 |
| 8 | Toru Mori (JPN) | 1055 |
| 9 | Chan Wai Man (HKG) | 1043 |
| 10 | Do Hak-Gil (KOR) | 1039 |
| 11 | Khao Chanchiao (THA) | 972 |

=== Singles TPB3 ===
December 14

| Rank | Athlete | Score |
|---|---|---|
| 1st place, gold medalist(s) | Huang Yu Hsiao (TPE) | 1224 |
| 2nd place, silver medalist(s) | Soo Choon Hung (MAS) | 1166 |
| 3rd place, bronze medalist(s) | Muhamad Suhaili Hamid (MAS) | 1116 |
| 4 | Seo Min-Seok (KOR) | 1069 |
| 5 | Yuen Wing Shan (HKG) | 1067 |
| 6 | Akiko Morisawa (JPN) | 1022 |
| 7 | Mohamed Ismail Hussain (SIN) | 1013 |
| 8 | Chan Tat Chung (HKG) | 984 |
| 9 | Lee Yong-Tae (KOR) | 929 |
| 10 | Yoshito Murai (JPN) | 918 |
| 11 | Pornprapa Denduang (THA) | 902 |
| 12 | Weerapol Sangwang (THA) | 889 |
| 13 | Huang Jingxin (CHN) | 752 |

=== Singles TPB8 ===
December 15

| Rank | Athlete | Score |
|---|---|---|
| 1st place, gold medalist(s) | Park Jae-Chul (KOR) | 982 |
| 2nd place, silver medalist(s) | Huang Jen Jung (TPE) | 963 |
| 3rd place, bronze medalist(s) | Lee Chia Chieh (TPE) | 948 |
| 4 | Anuar Saaid (SIN) | 816 |
| 5 | Mohammad Taufik Ahmadini (SIN) | 811 |
| 6 | Ng Kam Mui Katy (HKG) | 781 |
| 7 | Wong Mei Lan (HKG) | 774 |
| 8 | Ahmad Amil Usin (MAS) | 770 |
| 9 | Noor Lizah Salman (MAS) | 755 |

=== Singles TPB9 ===
December 15

| Rank | Athlete | Score |
|---|---|---|
| 1st place, gold medalist(s) | Yang Meng Chang (TPE) | 1282 |
| 2nd place, silver medalist(s) | Wong Kee Soon (MAS) | 1218 |
| 3rd place, bronze medalist(s) | Lee Seok-Jae (KOR) | 1126 |
| 4 | Nyat Abu Bakar (MAS) | 1115 |
| 5 | Lu Tai Ann (TPE) | 1106 |
| 6 | Wong Kwok Cheung (HKG) | 1083 |
| 7 | Min Jin-Ho (KOR) | 1076 |
| 8 | Rufo Tablang (PHI) | 954 |
| 9 | Goh Chen Keok (SIN) | 918 |
| 10 | Sawai Padpong (THA) | 891 |
| 11 | Angelito Guloya (PHI) | 818 |
| 12 | Aisah Ibrahim (SIN) | 750 |

=== Singles TPB10 ===
December 15

| Rank | Athlete | Score |
|---|---|---|
| 1st place, gold medalist(s) | Song Ki-Soo (KOR) | 1240 |
| 2nd place, silver medalist(s) | Kim Chang-Nyeon (KOR) | 1164 |
| 3rd place, bronze medalist(s) | Woon Wai Ping (MAS) | 1151 |
| 4 | Sixto Ducay (PHI) | 1056 |
| 5 | Chang Hui Min (TPE) | 1054 |
| 6 | Patrick Gerard Eusebio (PHI) | 1052 |
| 7 | Lu Ju Huang (TPE) | 1051 |
| 8 | Ahmad Najmuddin Dali (MAS) | 1033 |
| 9 | Tan Swang Hee (SIN) | 979 |
| 10 | Liang Xiong Ji (CHN) | 937 |
| 11 | Low Soon Kia (SIN) | 921 |
| 12 | Du Jun (CHN) | 891 |

=== Doubles TPB1+TPB3 ===
December 16

| Rank | Team | Score |
|---|---|---|
| 1st place, gold medalist(s) | South Korea (KOR); Kim Jung-Hoon; Seo Min-Seok | 2120 |
| 2nd place, silver medalist(s) | Japan (JPN); Toshiaki Aomatsu; Akiko Morisawa | 1923 |
| 3rd place, bronze medalist(s) | Singapore (SIN); Yong Phen Chong Thomas; Mohamed Ismail Hussain | 1870 |
| 4 | Chinese Taipei (TPE); Liao Hung Tsang; Huang Yu Hsiao | 1810 |
| 5 | Malaysia (MAS); Muhamad Hairul Miran; Soo Choon Hung | 1797 |
| 6 | Thailand (THA); Krisada Krietkongtawee; Pornprapa Denduang | 1743 |
| 7 | Japan (JPN); Tamami Emura; Yoshito Murai | 1716 |
| 8 | Malaysia (MAS); Mohd Suhairi Abdul Kadir; Muhamad Suhaili Hamid | 1706 |

=== Doubles TPB2+TPB2 ===
December 16

| Rank | Team | Score |
|---|---|---|
| 1st place, gold medalist(s) | Malaysia (MAS); Choo Kam Chan; Ku Izham Ku Harun | 2231 |
| 2nd place, silver medalist(s) | South Korea (KOR); Do Hak-Gil; Kim Nam-Hun | 2115 |
| 3rd place, bronze medalist(s) | Chinese Taipei (TPE); Ke Ming Shuo; Shieh Tsung Han | 2101 |
| 4 | Japan (JPN); Kozo Kimura; Toru Mori | 2058 |
| 5 | Hong Kong (HKG); Chan Wai Man; Wan Hon Yin | 2018 |

=== Doubles TPB8+TPB10 ===
December 16

| Rank | Team | Score |
|---|---|---|
| 1st place, gold medalist(s) | South Korea (KOR); Park Jae-Chul; Song Ki-Soo | 2138 |
| 2nd place, silver medalist(s) | Chinese Taipei (TPE); Huang Jen Jung; Lu Ju Huang | 2101 |
| 3rd place, bronze medalist(s) | Chinese Taipei (TPE); Lee Chia Chieh; Chang Hui Min | 1937 |
| 3rd place, bronze medalist(s) | Singapore (SIN); Mohammad Taufik Ahmadini; Tan Swang Hee | 1937 |
| 5 | Malaysia (MAS); Noor Lizah Salman; Woon Wai Ping | 1927 |
| 6 | Singapore (SIN); Anuar Saaid; Low Soon Kia | 1787 |
| 7 | Malaysia (MAS); Ahmad Amil Usin; Ahmad Najmuddin Dali | 1732 |

=== Doubles TPB9+TPB9 ===
December 16

| Rank | Team | Score |
|---|---|---|
| 1st place, gold medalist(s) | Malaysia (MAS); Abu Bakar Nyat; Wong Kee Soon | 2358 |
| 2nd place, silver medalist(s) | South Korea (KOR); Lee Seok-Jae; Min Jin-Ho | 2357 |
| 3rd place, bronze medalist(s) | Chinese Taipei (TPE); Lai Fou Hwan; Yang Meng Chang | 2314 |
| 4 | Chinese Taipei (TPE); Cheng Sheng Fu; Lu Tai Ann | 2085 |
| 5 | Philippines (PHI); Angelito Guloya; Rufo Tablang | 1727 |
| 6 | Singapore (SIN); Aisah Ibrahim; Goh Chen Keok | 1636 |
