= Tang Xuemei =

Chinese sitting volleyball player (born 1994)

Personal information
- Born: 4 February 1994 (age 32) Sichuan, China

Sport
- Sport: Sitting volleyball
Medal record
Representing China
Paralympic Games
Gold medal – first place	2012 London	Team
Silver medal – second place	2020 Tokyo	Team
Silver medal – second place	2024 Paris	Team
Asian Para Games
Gold medal – first place	2010 Guangzhou	Team
Gold medal – first place	2018 Jakarta	Team
Gold medal – first place	2022 Hangzhou	Team

Tang Xuemei (born 4 February 1994) is a Chinese sitting volleyball player who competes in international volleyball competitions. She was part of the Chinese sitting volleyball team who won gold at the 2012 Summer Paralympics as well as winning two consecutive silver medals at the 2020 and 2024 Summer Paralympics.

== Earthquake survivor ==
On 12 May 2008, fourteen year old Tang was in her school's dormitory in Wenchuan when the earthquake struck and the building began to shake violently. Tang started running but the floor underneath collapsed and she fell into a void. Tang's left leg was pinned down while her right leg was free, she survived from the building's collapse because she had a bowl on her head and a nearby wall did not fall on top of her. Tang was found and rescued 28 hours after the earthquake but her left leg was amputated.
