= Football 7-a-side at the 2010 Asian Para Games =

- Football 7-a-side pictogram

Tournament details
- Host country: China
- Dates: 13 – 18 December 2010
- Teams: 4
- Venue: 1 (in 1 host city)

Final positions
- Champions: Iran
- Runners-up: China
- Third place: Japan
- Fourth place: South Korea

Tournament statistics
- Matches played: 8
- Goals scored: 58 (7.25 per match)

7-a-side football at the 2010 Asian Para Games were held in Huagong Stadium 13 – 18 December 2010. There was 1 gold medal in this sport.

== Participating teams and officials ==
=== Qualifying ===
A total of five teams will qualify to compete in the football five a side competition. The host nation (China) automatically qualifies a team. A team may consist of a maximum of 14 athletes.

Means of qualification	Berths	Qualified
Host nation	1	China
Asian Region	3	Iran; Japan; South Korea
Total	4	

=== Squads ===
The individual teams contact following football gamblers on to:

China	Iran	Japan	South Korea
Gu Junwei; Wang Yixing; Wang Hao; Zou Shenghui; Zhu Xu; Ma Yanrong; Lin Congchang; Zeng Qingxiang; Liu Bo; Xu Guojun; Zhong Wanhui; Coach: Yang Weixiang	Mehran Nikoee Majd; Jasem Bakhshi; Hashem Rastegarimobin; Sadegh Hassani Baghi; Farzad Mehri; Behnam Sohrabi; Seyed Nasser Hosseini Far; Morteza Heidari; Bahman Ansaari; Ehsan Gholamhosseinpour; Moslem Akbari; Ardeshir Mahini; Coach: Hosein Saleh	Naoyoshi Kagayama; Keisuke Kawabe; Kenji Hashimoto; Yuji Yamada; Taisei Taniguchi; Ryuta Yoshino; Koji Watarai; Daisuke Kobayashi; Tetsuya Toda; Tsukasa Kawano; Takayuki Iwasa; Coach: Yukio Jin	

== Venues ==
The venues to be used for the World Championships were located in Guangzhou.

Guangzhou	Football 7-a-side at the 2010 Asian Para Games is located in China
Stadium: Huagong Stadium	Football 7-a-side at the 2010 Asian Para Games is located in China
Capacity: Unknown	Football 7-a-side at the 2010 Asian Para Games is located in China

== Format ==
The first round, or group stage, was a competition between the 4 teams in one group, where engaged in a round-robin tournament within itself. In both of the best placed, they play in the final for the tournament, the two last teams play for third place.

Tie-breaking criteria for group play
The ranking of teams in each group was based on the following criteria:
1. Number of points
2. Goal difference
3. Number of goals scored
4. Number of points obtained in matches between tied teams
5. Goal difference in matches between tied teams
6. Number of goals scored in matches between tied teams
7. Drawing of lots

Classification
Athletes with a physical disability competed. The athlete's disability was caused by a non-progressive brain damage that affects motor control, such as cerebral palsy, traumatic brain injury or stroke. Athletes must be ambulant.

Players were classified by level of disability.

- C5: Athletes with difficulties when walking and running, but not in standing or when kicking the ball.
- C6: Athletes with control and co-ordination problems of their upper limbs, especially when running.
- C7: Athletes with hemiplegia.
- C8: Athletes with minimal disability; must meet eligibility criteria and have an impairment that has impact on the sport of football.

Teams must field at least one class C5 or C6 player at all times. No more than two players of class C8 are permitted to play at the same time.

== Group stage ==
In the first group stage have seen the teams in a one group of four teams.

Pos	Team	Pld	W	D	L	GF	GA	GD	Pts	Qualified for
1	Iran	3	3	0	0	23	0	+23	9	Team play for position 1
2	China	3	2	0	1	7	10	−3	6	Team play for position 1
3	Japan	3	1	0	2	4	11	−7	3	Team play for the position 3
4	South Korea	3	0	0	3	3	16	−13	0	Team play for the position 3

Source: Football 7-a-side at the 2010 Asian Para Games
Rules for classification: Tie-breaking criteria
2010-12-13
12:30

China	4–2	South Korea

Huagong Stadium
2010-12-13
15:00

Japan	0–7	Iran

Huagong Stadium
2010-12-14
12:30

South Korea	1–4	Japan

Huagong Stadium
2010-12-14
15:00

Iran	8–0	China

Huagong Stadium
2010-12-15
12:30

South Korea	0–8	Iran

Huagong Stadium
2010-12-15
15:00

Japan	0–3	China

Huagong Stadium

=== Semi-finals ===
2010-12-17
12:00

Iran	7–0	South Korea

Huagong Stadium

2010-12-17
14:30

China	2–1 (a.e.t.)	Japan

Huagong Stadium

== Finals ==
=== Bronze-medal match ===
2010-12-18
12:00

South Korea	0–2	Japan

Aoti Hockey Field

=== Gold-medal match ===
2010-12-18
14:30

Iran	7–0	China

Aoti Hockey Field

== Statistics ==
=== Ranking ===
Rank	Team
Gold medal	Iran
Silver medal	China
Bronze medal	Japan
4.	South Korea
