= Yuriy Andryushin =

Ukrainian Paralympic swimmer

Medal record

Men's swimming

Representing Ukraine

Paralympic Games
Gold medal – first place	2000 Sydney	50 m butterfly S7
Bronze medal – third place	1996 Atlanta	100 m freestyle S7
Bronze medal – third place	2004 Athens	50 m butterfly S7

World Para Swimming Championships
Silver medal – second place	2006 Durban	50 m butterfly S7

Yuriy Andryushin (Ukrainian: Юрій Сергійович Андрюшин; born 17 September 1970) is a paralympic swimmer from Ukraine competing mainly in category S7 events.

Yuriy has competed at three Paralympics for the Ukrainian Paralympic swimming team winning a single medal each time. His first games in 1996 led to a bronze in the 100m freestyle, he also competed in the 50m freestyle finishing sixth and 400m freestyle where he failed to make the final. At the 2000 Summer Paralympics in Sydney he competed in the 50m and 100m freestyle finishing fifth in both but it was in the 50m butterfly where he won a gold medal in a new world-record time. In his third games in 2004 he could only manage a bronze in the 50m butterfly but also competed in the 100m freestyle where he was disqualified in his heat, finished eighth in the 200m medley, the 50m freestyle where he finished sixth and was part of the Ukrainian teams in the 4 × 100 m freestyle that failed to make the final and the 4 × 100 m medley that finished sixth.
