= Swimming at the 2004 Summer Paralympics – Men's 50 metre butterfly S7 =

Men's 50m Butterfly S7 at the XII Paralympic Games
- Paralympic Swimming
- Venue: Olympic Aquatic Centre
- Dates: 25 September 2004
- Competitors: 15 from 11 nations
- Winning time: 31.32

Medalists
| 1st place, gold medalist(s) | | Tian Rong | China |
| 2nd place, silver medalist(s) | | Pei Mang | China |
| 3rd place, bronze medalist(s) | | Yuriy Andryushin | Ukraine |

The Men's 50 metre butterfly S7 swimming event at the 2004 Summer Paralympics was competed on 25 September. It was won by Tian Rong, representing China.

== 1st round ==
| Qualified for final round |

Heat 1

25 Sept. 2004, morning session

| Rank | Athlete | Time | Notes |
|---|---|---|---|
| 1 | Tian Rong (CHN) | 31.91 | WR |
| 2 | Pei Mang (CHN) | 33.46 | |
| 3 | David Roberts (GBR) | 35.32 | |
| 4 | Alex Harris (AUS) | 37.68 | |
| 5 | Daniel Kamber (USA) | 39.16 | |
| 6 | Tomas Scharf (CZE) | 39.68 | |
| 7 | Tadhg Slattery (RSA) | 40.53 | |

Heat 2

25 Sept. 2004, morning session

| Rank | Athlete | Time | Notes |
|---|---|---|---|
| 1 | Yuriy Andryushin (UKR) | 32.91 | |
| 2 | Daniel Kuenzi (SUI) | 35.34 | |
| 3 | Matthew Walker (GBR) | 35.68 | |
| 4 | Alex Hadley (AUS) | 36.60 | |
| 5 | Daisuke Ejima (JPN) | 36.61 | |
| 6 | Jose Arnulfo Medeiros (BRA) | 36.92 | |
| 7 | Jose Arnulfo Ramos (ESP) | 37.57 | |
| 8 | Dalibor Mach (CZE) | 37.91 | |

== Final round ==
25 Sept. 2004, evening session

| Rank | Athlete | Time | Notes |
|---|---|---|---|
| 1st place, gold medalist(s) | Tian Rong (CHN) | 31.32 | WR |
| 2nd place, silver medalist(s) | Pei Mang (CHN) | 32.91 | |
| 3rd place, bronze medalist(s) | Yuriy Andryushin (UKR) | 33.12 | |
| 4 | David Roberts (GBR) | 33.94 | |
| 5 | Daniel Kuenzi (SUI) | 34.92 | |
| 6 | Matthew Walker (GBR) | 35.52 | |
| 7 | Daisuke Ejima (JPN) | 35.91 | |
| 8 | Alex Hadley (AUS) | 36.20 | |
