= Cycling at the 2010 Asian Para Games =

Paralympic Cycling at the 2010 Asian Para Games

Cycling at the 2010 Asian Para Games were held in Guangzhou, China from December 13 to December 18.

== Medals ==
Rank	Nation	Gold	Silver	Bronze	Total
1	China (CHN)	6	4	6	16
2	South Korea (KOR)	4	4	4	12
3	Japan (JPN)	2	3	0	5
4	Lebanon (LBN)	0	1	1	2
5	Iran (IRI)	0	0	1	1
Totals (5 entries)		12	12	12	36

== Medalists ==
=== Road cycling ===
Event	Gold	Silver	Bronze
Men's road race C	Liu Xinyang; China	Zheng Yuanchao; China	Bahman Golbarnezhad; Iran
Mixed road race B	Song Jong-hoon; Kim Jong-giu; South Korea	Sun Jiajia; Bao Lifeng; China	Cho Jae-min; Moon Jung-kook; South Korea
Mixed road race C	Jin Yong-sik; South Korea	Gao Xiaoming; China	Liang Guihua; China
Mixed road race H	Cho Hang-duk; South Korea	Edward Maalouf; Lebanon	Kim Young-ki; South Korea
Mixed time trial B	Sun Jiajia; Bao Lifeng; China	Cho Jae-min; Moon Jung-kook; South Korea	Chen Mulan; Lim Haimei; China
Mixed time trial C	Liu Xinyang; China	Masashi Ishii; Japan	Li Zhangyu; China
Mixed time trial H	Naohiko Okumura; Japan	Cho Hang-duk; South Korea	Edward Maalouf; Lebanon

=== Track cycling ===
Event	Gold	Silver	Bronze
Men's individual pursuit C	Liu Xinyang; China	Masashi Ishii; Japan	Ji Xiaofei; China
Mixed individual pursuit B	Song Jong-hoon; Kim Jong-giu; South Korea	Cho Jae-min; Moon Jung-kook; South Korea	Sun Jiajia; Bao Lifeng; China
Mixed individual pursuit C	Liang Guihua; China	Masaki Fujita; Japan	Jin Yong-sik; South Korea
Mixed time trial B	Yasufumi Ito; Tatsuyuki Oshiro; Japan	Song Jong-hoon; Kim Jong-giu; South Korea	Cho Jae-min; Moon Jung-kook; South Korea
Mixed time trial C	Zhou Jufang; China	Liu Xinyang; China	Ruan Jianping; China

== See also ==
- Cycling at the 2010 Asian Games
