= Swimming at the 2004 Summer Paralympics – Men's 4 × 50 metre medley relay 20pts =

Athletic event

Men's 4x50m Medley 20 pts at the XII Paralympic Games
- Paralympic Swimming
- Venue: Olympic Aquatic Centre
- Dates: 27 September 2004
- Competitors: 11
- Winning time: 2:37.46

Medalists
1st place, gold medalist(s)		Luis Silva; Francisco Avelino; Clodoaldo Silva; Adriano Lima	Brazil
2nd place, silver medalist(s)		Daisuke Maeda; Takayuki Suzuki; Yuji Hanada; Daisuke Ejima	Japan
3rd place, bronze medalist(s)		Javier Torres; Jordi Gordillo; Jose Arnulfo Ramos; Miguel Luque	Spain

The Men's 4 x 50 metre medley relay 20pts swimming event at the 2004 Summer Paralympics was competed on 27 September. It was won by the team representing Brazil.

== 1st round ==
Qualified for final round

Heat 1

27 Sept. 2004, morning session

Rank	Team	Time	Notes
1	Thailand	2:51.90	
2	China	2:52.26	
3	Spain	2:54.97	
4	Great Britain	2:59.59	
5	United States	3:09.35	

Heat 2

27 Sept. 2004, morning session

Rank	Team	Time	Notes
1	Japan	2:44.30	
2	Brazil	2:45.00	
3	France	2:57.47	
4	Czech Republic	3:08.36	
5	Germany	3:20.88	
	Mexico	DSQ	

== Final round ==
27 Sept. 2004, evening session

Rank	Team	Time	Notes
1st place, gold medalist(s)	Brazil	2:37.46	PR
2nd place, silver medalist(s)	Japan	2:42.52	
3rd place, bronze medalist(s)	Spain	2:44.65	
4	China	2:47.06	
5	Thailand	2:50.62	
6	Great Britain	2:57.06	
7	France	2:58.07	
8	Czech Republic	3:12.82	

== Team Lists ==
Thailand; Prajim Rieangsantien; Taweesook Samuksaneeto; Somchai Doungkaew; Voravit Kaewkham	China; Li Peng; Yin Jianhua; Tang Yuan; Du Jian Ping	Spain; Javier Torres; Jordi Gordillo; Jose Arnulfo Ramos; Miguel Luque	Great Britain; Kenneth Cairns; Gareth Duke; Anthony Stephens; Sascha Kindred
United States; Justin Fleming; Aaron Paulson; Joe McCarthy; Michael Demarco	Japan; Daisuke Maeda; Takayuki Suzuki; Yuji Hanada; Daisuke Ejima	Brazil; Luis Silva; Francisco Avelino; Clodoaldo Silva; Adriano Lima	France; Eric Lindmann; David Smétanine; Pascal Pinard; Gaetan Dautresire
Czech Republic; Tomas Scharf; Dalibor Mach; Jan Povysil; Martin Kovar	Germany; Thomas Grimm; Nils Grunenberg; Sebastian Iwanow; Christian Goldbach	Mexico; Juan Ignacio Reyes; Emilio Montiel; Vidal Dominguez; Pedro Rangel	
