= Indonesia at the 2010 Asian Para Games =

- IOC code: INA
- NPC: National Paralympic Committee of Indonesia

in Guangzhou 12–19 December 2010
- Medals Ranked 14th: Gold 1 Silver 5 Bronze 5 Total 11

Asian Para Games appearances (overview)
- 2010; 2014; 2018; 2022

Youth appearances
- 2009; 2013; 2017; 2021

Indonesia participated in the 2010 Asian Para Games–First Asian Para Games in Guangzhou, China from 13 to 19 December 2010. Athletes from Indonesia won total 11 medals (including one gold), and finished at the 14th spot in a medal table.

== Medal summary ==
=== Medals by sport ===
Medals by sport
Sport	1st place, gold medalist(s)	2nd place, silver medalist(s)	3rd place, bronze medalist(s)	Total
Badminton	1	4	1	6
Swimming	0	1	0	1
Athletics	0	0	3	3
Table tennis	0	0	1	1

=== Medalists ===
Medal	Name	Sport	Event
Gold	Hary Susanto; Trihono	Badminton	Men's doubles BMSTL1-3
Silver	Dwiyoko	Badminton	Men's singles BMSTL2
Silver	Hary Susanto	Badminton	Men's singles BMSTL3
Silver	Suryo Nugroho	Badminton	Men's singles BMSTU5
Silver	Dwiyoko; Ryan Yohwari	Badminton	Men's doubles BMSTU4–5
Silver	Agus Ngaimin	Swimming	
Bronze	Suyono	Athletics	Men's 200 m T38
Bronze	Suyono	Athletics	Men's 400 m T38
Bronze	Setiyo Budihartanto	Athletics	Men's Long jump F46
Bronze	Ryan Yohwari	Badminton	Men's singles BMSTU5
Bronze	Dian David Mickael Jacobs	Table tennis	Men's singles TT10
