= Daisuke Ejima =

Japanese Paralympic swimmer (born 1986)

Medal record

Swimming

Representing Japan

Paralympic Games
Silver medal – second place	2004 Athens	4 × 50 metre medley relay – 20 pts

Asian Para Games
Gold medal – first place	2010 Guangzhou	50m butterfly S7
Gold medal – first place	2018 Jakarta	100m backstroke S7
Silver medal – second place	2010 Guangzhou	100m backstroke S7
Silver medal – second place	2010 Guangzhou	4×100m medley relay

Daisuke Ejima (江島 大佑, Ejima Daisuke; born January 13, 1986 in Kyoto Prefecture) is a retired Paralympic swimmer from Japan competing mainly in category S7 events.

Ejima has competed at two Paralympics, firstly in 2004 in Athens and then in 2008 in Beijing. In Athens he was part of the Japanese 4×50m Medley team that won a silver medal behind a new Paralympic record set by Brazil. He also competed in the 50m butterfly finishing seventh, 100m backstroke finishing seventh and was disqualified from the heat of 200m individual medley. At the 2008 games he competed in the same individual events finishing fourth in the 50m butterfly, fifth in the 100m backstroke and seventh in the 200m individual medley. He competed in the same categories at the 2012 Paralympics in London.

== Personal life ==
Ejima started taking swimming classes at the age of three, and continued to train throughout his childhood with the goal of practicing competitively. When he was in eighth grade, he had a stroke after a baseball game with friends, remaining with the left side of his body paralyzed. Over time, he partly regained motion in his left leg.
