= Vietnam at the 2010 Asian Para Games =

- IOC code: VIE
- NPC: Vietnam Paralympic Association

in Guangzhou 12–19 December 2010
- Competitors: 54 in 6 sports
- Medals Ranked 11th: Gold 3 Silver 4 Bronze 10 Total 17

Asian Para Games appearances (overview)
- 2010; 2014; 2018; 2022; 2026

Youth appearances
- 2009; 2013; 2017

Vietnam participated in the 2010 Asian Para Games in Guangzhou, China on 13–19 December 2010.

== Competitors ==
Sport	Men	Women	Total
Athletics	12	8	20
Badminton	8	0	8
Judo	1	1	2
Powerlifting	3	2	5
Swimming	8	5	13
Table Tennis	4	2	6
Total	36	18	54

== Medal summary ==
=== Medal table ===
Sport	Gold	Silver	Bronze	Total
Athletics	0	3	5	8
Badminton	2	0	1	3
Powerlifting	0	0	2	2
Swimming	1	1	1	3
Table Tennis	0	0	1	1
Total	3	4	10	17

=== Medalists ===
Medal	Name	Sport	Event	Date
Gold	NGUYEN Thi Thanh Thao	Badminton	Women's Javelin Throw - F54/55/56	Tuesday, 14 December
Gold	PHAM Duc Trung	Badminton	Men's Singles BMSTL2	Wednesday, 15 December
Gold	HOANG Pham Thang	Badminton	Men's Singles BMSTL1	Wednesday, 15 December
Gold	VO Thanh Tung	Swimming	Men's 50m Freestyle - S5	Tuesday, 14 December
Silver	NGUYEN Thi Thanh Thao	Athletics	Women's 100m - T53	Wednesday, 15 December
Silver	TRINH Cong Luan	Athletics	Men's Shot Put - F54/55/56	Tuesday, 14 December
Silver	VO Thanh Tung	Swimming	Men's 100m Freestyle - S5	Thursday, 16 December
Silver	le Duc Hung	Athletics	Men's 400m - T11	Saturday, 18 December
Bronze	NGUYEN Anh Tuan	Athletics	Men's Long Jump - F11	Tuesday, 14 December
Bronze	NGUYEN Huu Thinh	Athletics	Men's 100m - T37	Friday, 17 December
Bronze	Nguyen Thi Thanh Thao	Athletics	Women's 200m - T53	Friday, 17 December
Bronze	DAO van Cuong	Athletics	Men's 400m - T11	Saturday, 18 December
Bronze	CAO Ngoc Hung	Athletics	Men's Discus Throw - F57/58	Wednesday, 15 December
Bronze	NGUYEN Thi Hong	Powerlifting	Women's -40 kg	Monday, 13 December
Bronze	DINH Thi Nga	Powerlifting	Women's -52 kg	Thursday, 16 December
Bronze	NGUYEN Thi Sa Ri	Swimming	Women's 100m Breaststroke - SB5	Friday, 17 December
Bronze	Women's team	Table Tennis		Saturday, 18 December
