= Feng Xiao-min =

Chinese-born French artist

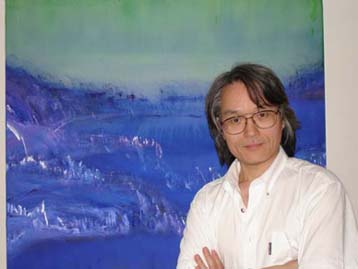
Feng Xiao-Min

Feng Xiao-Min (Chinese: 冯骁鸣; pinyin: Féng Xiǎomíng; born in November 1959) is a Chinese-born French artist.

== Biography ==
Born in November 1959, in Shanghai, China, Feng grew up in a family of intellectuals (banking family from his mother’s side).

After graduating from Fine Arts studies in China, he moved to France in 1988 and enrolled at the Ecole Nationale Supérieure des Beaux-Arts in Paris. Feng was later invited to teach at the same institution from 1997 to 2000. After that, he decided to give up teaching to focus entirely on his own creations.

Feng has published numerous books on paintings and calligraphy. And some of his paintings had been chosen to be integrated into French school manuals.

He regularly exhibits his artworks in France and abroad. In 2003-2004, he participated in a joint exhibition with the French photographer Marc Riboud at the Musée Carnavalet in Paris. He also exhibited in the Jing'an Sculpture Park Art Center, in Shanghai, and in Hong Kong, alongside of works from French-Chinese artists such as Zao Wou-Ki and Chu Teh-Chun.

His artworks are collected and presented in various private and public collections, including galleries, museums and foundations, in France and abroad. Feng frequently exhibits at international art fairs and biennales and was commissioned to produce work for the 2017 BRICS summit.

== Public collection ==
- Art museum Zhu Qizhan in Shanghai, China
- Museum of Modern Art of Duolun in Shanghai, China
- The AMOS Association, The Cultural Center of Saint Saturnin, France
- Cultural Office for the International Exchange of the city of Shanghai, China
- Artco France, Paris, France
- Purple Roof Gallery, Shanghai, China
- Hong Kong Shui On Group, Hong Kong
- Museum of Contemporary Art of Anting in Shanghai, China
- Museum of Contemporary Art of Dunkerque, France
- Shanghai Xintiandi Langham Hotel, Shanghai, China
- Image of China Gallery, Singapore
- M.Y. Foundation (Seoul), South Korea
- Pacific International Lines (Pte) Ltd., Singapore
- State commission for the 2017 BRICS summit in Xiamen, China
- Hkri Taikoo Hui Group, Hong Kong
- The Sukhothai Hotel, Shanghai, China
- Shanghai ART Museum, Shanghai, China

== Bibliography ==
Feng is the author of several books, published in France, such as:

- Lao Tseu – La voie du Tao– Alternatives Editions, Paris, 2000
- Porte-Bonheur– Alternatives Editions, Paris, January 2002
- Monograph – L’Union de l’Encre et du Pinceau– Flammarion Editions, Paris, May 2003
