= Li Xiaohui =

Li Xiaohui may refer to:

- Li Xiaohui (discus thrower)
- Li Xiaohui (cyclist)
- Li Xiaohui (tennis)
