= Eshrat Kordestani =

Iranian volleyball player

Personal information
- Native name: عشرت کردستانی
- Born: January 2, 1984 (age 42) Kerman, Kerman province, Iran

Sport
- Country: Iran
- Sport: Sitting volleyball
Medal record
Representing Iran
Asian Para Games
Silver medal – second place	2014 Incheon	Team
Bronze medal – third place	2010 Guangzhou	Team

Eshrat Kordestani (Persian: عشرت کردستانی, born 2 January 1984) is an Iranian Paralympian in Sitting volleyball. She originally competed in volleyball before she lost her foot in an anti-personnel mine accident in 2002. The Iranian women's sitting volleyball team won silver at the 2014 Incheon, when she was captain. The team also qualified to compete at the 2016 Summer Paralympics for the first time. She was the captain of the Iranian women's sitting volleyball team and also the flag-bearer for Iran in Rio 2016.

== Personal life ==
Kordestani has been war wounded and lost her right foot in Shalamcheh in 2002 when she was 19 years old, hitting an Anti-personnel mine as a leftover from the Iran-Iraq war. She then started sitting volleyball after being paralyzed, following her volleyball career.

== Honors ==
- Captain of the Iran women's sitting volleyball team to first ever qualify for the Paralympics in Rio de Janeiro 2016.
- The Flagbearer for Iran at the 2016 Summer Paralympics in Rio de Janeiro.
- Top scorer for Iran team

Olympic Games
Preceded by Abdolreza Jokar	Flagbearer for Iran; Rio de Janeiro 2016	Succeeded by Incumbent
