= Sitting volleyball at the 2010 Asian Para Games =

- Location: Guangzhou, China
- Dates: 13–18 December

Sitting Volleyball at the 2010 Asian Para Games were held in Guangwai Gymnasium from December 13 to December 18. There were 2 gold medals in this sport.

== Medalists ==
Event	Gold	Silver	Bronze
Men's team	Iran (IRI) Ramezan Salehi; Mohammad Reza Rahimi; Arash Khormali; Davoud Alipourian; Hadi Sajedinia; Nasser Hassanpour; Majid Lashgarisanami; Jalil Imeri (captain); Ahmad Eiri; Issa Zirahi; Abolfazl Moharram Khani (libero); Meisam Alipour Alkami; Coach: Ali Kashfia	China (CHN) Tong Jiao; Qiu Lin; Jin Heng; Gao Hui; Liang Baolin; Wang Xiaoliang (libero); Zhou Canming; Wang Haidong (captain); Zhao Peiwen; Zhang Zhongmin; Li Lei; Ding Xiaochao; Coach: Liu Fang Qing	Iraq (IRQ) Abaas Al-Ghuraibawi; Murtadha Hadi; Majeed Majeed (libero); Majeed Kaabi; Ahmed Al-Suoani; Mahdi Xhayoon; Naser Elaibi; Ahmed Dahash; Hussain Al-Ugbi; Miuayad Hattab; Salah Al-Shammari (captain); Hadi Jubouri; Coach: Yakoob Shafi
Women's team	China (CHN) Tang Xuemei; Lu Hongqin (captain); Zhang Haiyan; Qiu Junfei; Su Limei; Zheng Xiongying (libero); Gao Wenwen; Li Liping; Zhang Xufei; Yang Yanling; Zhang Lijun; Sheng Yuhong; Coach: Zhang Jun	Japan (JPN) Mamiko Osada; Sachie Awano (libero); Yukari Okahira (captain); Junko Fujii; Yoko Saito; Shiori Ohmura; Michiyo Nishiie; Noriko Kaneda; Satoko Kikuchi; Kimiko Kobatake; Harumi Sakamoto; Coach: Yoshihisa Mano	Iran (IRI) Masoumeh Zarei Barouti (captain); Zeinab Maleki Dizicheh (libero); Azam Amouei; Zahra Delkhosh; Zahra Gol; Safieh Alighorchi; Nasrin Farhadi; Sakineh Keshvari; Eshrat Kordestani; Tayebeh Jafari Vardanjani; Mehri Fallahi Daryakenari; Zahra Abdi; Coach: Batoul Moshrefjavadi

== Men's tournament ==
=== Preliminary round ===
==== Pool A ====
Team	P	W	L	Sets	Points
China (CHN)	3	3	0	9:1	6
Iraq (IRQ)	3	2	1	7:3	4
Kazakhstan (KAZ)	3	1	2	4:6	2
Thailand (THA)	3	0	3	0:9	0

2010-12-13; 12:10	China (CHN)	3–0	Kazakhstan (KAZ)	Guangwai Gymnasium; Attendance: 1,500; Referees: Morteza Akrami (Iran)
2010-12-13; 12:10	(25–10, 25–12, 25–16)			Guangwai Gymnasium; Attendance: 1,500; Referees: Morteza Akrami (Iran)

2010-12-13; 15:30	Iraq (IRQ)	3–0	Thailand (THA)	Guangwai Gymnasium; Attendance: 200; Referees: Mehdi Ashouri (Iran)
2010-12-13; 15:30	(25–20, 25–12, 25–15)			Guangwai Gymnasium; Attendance: 200; Referees: Mehdi Ashouri (Iran)

2010-12-14; 12:00	Kazakhstan (KAZ)	3–0	Thailand (THA)	Guangwai Gymnasium; Attendance: 300; Referees: Chen Xin (China PR)
2010-12-14; 12:00	(25–18, 26–24, 25–20)			Guangwai Gymnasium; Attendance: 300; Referees: Chen Xin (China PR)

2010-12-14; 16:10	China (CHN)	3–1	Iraq (IRQ)	Guangwai Gymnasium; Attendance: 650; Referees: Jung Mal-Soon (South Korea)
2010-12-14; 16:10	(21–25, 25–22, 25–22, 25–19)			Guangwai Gymnasium; Attendance: 650; Referees: Jung Mal-Soon (South Korea)

2010-12-15; 12:00	Iraq (IRQ)	3–1	Kazakhstan (KAZ)	Guangwai Gymnasium; Attendance: 350; Referees: Jiang Yi (China PR)
2010-12-15; 12:00	(27–25, 25–20, 18–25, 25–12)			Guangwai Gymnasium; Attendance: 350; Referees: Jiang Yi (China PR)

2010-12-15; 15:30	China (CHN)	3–0	Thailand (THA)	Guangwai Gymnasium; Attendance: 330; Referees: Morteza Akrami (Iran)
2010-12-15; 15:30	(25–11, 25–16, 25–14)			Guangwai Gymnasium; Attendance: 330; Referees: Morteza Akrami (Iran)

==== Pool B ====
Team	P	W	L	Sets	Points
Iran (IRI)	3	3	0	9:0	6
South Korea (KOR)	3	2	1	6:4	4
Japan (JPN)	3	1	2	4:6	2
Myanmar (MYA)	3	0	3	0:9	0

2010-12-13; 14:00	Myanmar (MYA)	0–3	South Korea (KOR)	Guangwai Gymnasium; Attendance: 300; Referees: An Qi (China PR)
2010-12-13; 14:00	(16–25, 14–25, 18–25)			Guangwai Gymnasium; Attendance: 300; Referees: An Qi (China PR)

2010-12-13; 17:00	Iran (IRI)	3–0	Japan (JPN)	Guangwai Gymnasium; Attendance: 1,500; Referees: Jiang Yi (China PR)
2010-12-13; 17:00	(25–10, 25–11, 25–13)			Guangwai Gymnasium; Attendance: 1,500; Referees: Jiang Yi (China PR)

2010-12-14; 14:00	South Korea (KOR)	3–1	Japan (JPN)	Guangwai Gymnasium; Attendance: 650; Referees: Leyli Tavakoli (Iran)
2010-12-14; 14:00	(25–19, 18–25, 25–11, 25–20)			Guangwai Gymnasium; Attendance: 650; Referees: Leyli Tavakoli (Iran)

2010-12-14; 18:18	Myanmar (MYA)	0–3	Iran (IRI)	Guangwai Gymnasium; Attendance: 2,500; Referees: Chaitat Sudchittanond (Thailand)
2010-12-14; 18:18	(6–25, 5–25, 9–25)			Guangwai Gymnasium; Attendance: 2,500; Referees: Chaitat Sudchittanond (Thailand)

2010-12-15; 14:08	Iran (IRI)	3–0	South Korea (KOR)	Guangwai Gymnasium; Attendance: 650; Referees: Qian Jinghong (China PR)
2010-12-15; 14:08	(25–9, 25–10, 25–5)			Guangwai Gymnasium; Attendance: 650; Referees: Qian Jinghong (China PR)

2010-12-15; 17:00	Myanmar (MYA)	0–3	Japan (JPN)	Guangwai Gymnasium; Attendance: 600; Referees: An Qi (China PR)
2010-12-15; 17:00	(21–25, 24–26, 17–25)			Guangwai Gymnasium; Attendance: 600; Referees: An Qi (China PR)

=== Final round ===
==== Semi-finals ====
2010-12-17; 13:00	China (CHN)	3–0	South Korea (KOR)	Guangwai Gymnasium; Attendance: 800; Referees: Morteza Akrami (Iran)
2010-12-17; 13:00	(25–8, 25–12, 25–15)			Guangwai Gymnasium; Attendance: 800; Referees: Morteza Akrami (Iran)

2010-12-17; 14:30	Iran (IRI)	3–0	Iraq (IRQ)	Guangwai Gymnasium; Attendance: 1,800; Referees: Jiang Yi (China PR)
2010-12-17; 14:30	(25–18, 25–9, 25–20)			Guangwai Gymnasium; Attendance: 1,800; Referees: Jiang Yi (China PR)

==== 7-8th-place match ====
2010-12-17; 16:10	Thailand (THA)	0–3	Myanmar (MYA)	Guangwai Gymnasium; Attendance: 400; Referees: Ahmad Faisal Kasim (Malaysia)
2010-12-17; 16:10	(21–25, 13–25, 15–25)			Guangwai Gymnasium; Attendance: 400; Referees: Ahmad Faisal Kasim (Malaysia)

==== 5-6th-place match ====
2010-12-17; 17:33	Kazakhstan (KAZ)	1–3	Japan (JPN)	Guangwai Gymnasium; Attendance: 630; Referees: Leyli Tavakoli (Iran)
2010-12-17; 17:33	(16–25, 27–25, 18–25, 20–25)			Guangwai Gymnasium; Attendance: 630; Referees: Leyli Tavakoli (Iran)

==== Bronze-medal match ====
2010-12-18; 9:00	South Korea (KOR)	2–3	Iraq (IRQ)	Guangwai Gymnasium; Attendance: 850; Referees: Chen Xin (China PR)
2010-12-18; 9:00	(14–25, 25–19, 25–23, 17–25, 10–25)			Guangwai Gymnasium; Attendance: 850; Referees: Chen Xin (China PR)

==== Gold-medal match ====
2010-12-18; 17:00	China (CHN)	1–3	Iran (IRI)	Guangwai Gymnasium; Attendance: 2,450; Referees: Jung Mal-Soon (South Korea)
2010-12-18; 17:00	(25–20, 21–25, 21–25, 14–25)			Guangwai Gymnasium; Attendance: 2,450; Referees: Jung Mal-Soon (South Korea)

=== Men's final standing ===
Rank	Nation
1st place, gold medalist(s)	Iran (IRI)
2nd place, silver medalist(s)	China (CHN)
3rd place, bronze medalist(s)	Iraq (IRQ)
4	South Korea (KOR)
5	Japan (JPN)
6	Kazakhstan (KAZ)
7	Myanmar (MYA)
8	Thailand (THA)

== Women's tournament ==
=== Group round ===
Team	P	W	L	Sets	Points
China (CHN)	4	4	0	12:0	8
Iran (IRI)	4	3	1	9:3	6
Japan (JPN)	4	2	2	6:6	4
Mongolia (MGL)	4	1	3	3:9	2
Pakistan (PAK)	4	0	4	0:12	0

2010-12-13; 9:00	Japan (JPN)	3–0	Pakistan (PAK)	Guangwai Gymnasium; Attendance: 300; Referees: Jung Mal-Soon (South Korea)
2010-12-13; 9:00	(25–3, 25–2, 25–5)			Guangwai Gymnasium; Attendance: 300; Referees: Jung Mal-Soon (South Korea)

2010-12-13; 10:30	Iran (IRI)	3–0	Mongolia (MGL)	Guangwai Gymnasium; Attendance: 220; Referees: Qian Jinghong (China PR)
2010-12-13; 10:30	(25–10, 25–12, 25–16)			Guangwai Gymnasium; Attendance: 220; Referees: Qian Jinghong (China PR)

2010-12-13; 18:30	Pakistan (PAK)	0–3	China (CHN)	Guangwai Gymnasium; Attendance: 180; Referees: Myint Htay (Myanmar)
2010-12-13; 18:30	(4–25, 2–26, 2–25)			Guangwai Gymnasium; Attendance: 180; Referees: Myint Htay (Myanmar)

2010-12-14; 9:00	China (CHN)	3–0	Mongolia (MGL)	Guangwai Gymnasium; Attendance: 300; Referees: Ayan Rakhmetov (Kazakhstan)
2010-12-14; 9:00	(25–6, 25–7, 25–6)			Guangwai Gymnasium; Attendance: 300; Referees: Ayan Rakhmetov (Kazakhstan)

2010-12-14; 10:30	Iran (IRI)	3–0	Pakistan (PAK)	Guangwai Gymnasium; Attendance: 410; Referees: Ahmad Faisal Kasim (Malaysia)
2010-12-14; 10:30	(25–4, 25–4, 25–1)			Guangwai Gymnasium; Attendance: 410; Referees: Ahmad Faisal Kasim (Malaysia)

2010-12-14; 19:26	Japan (JPN)	3–0	Mongolia (MGL)	Guangwai Gymnasium; Attendance: 2,000; Referees: Mehdi Ashouri (Iran)
2010-12-14; 19:26	(25–10, 25–15, 25–7)			Guangwai Gymnasium; Attendance: 2,000; Referees: Mehdi Ashouri (Iran)

2010-12-14; 20:50	China (CHN)	3–0	Iran (IRI)	Guangwai Gymnasium; Attendance: 800; Referees: Mohamad Amee Sanusi (Malaysia)
2010-12-14; 20:50	(25–9, 25–15, 25–13)			Guangwai Gymnasium; Attendance: 800; Referees: Mohamad Amee Sanusi (Malaysia)

2010-12-15; 9:00	China (CHN)	3–0	Japan (JPN)	Guangwai Gymnasium; Attendance: 1,000; Referees: Leyli Tavakoli (Iran)
2010-12-15; 9:00	(25–13, 25–10, 25–20)			Guangwai Gymnasium; Attendance: 1,000; Referees: Leyli Tavakoli (Iran)

2010-12-15; 10:30	Mongolia (MGL)	3–0	Pakistan (PAK)	Guangwai Gymnasium; Attendance: 650; Referees: Myint Htay (Myanmar)
2010-12-15; 10:30	(25–5, 25–8, 25–4)			Guangwai Gymnasium; Attendance: 650; Referees: Myint Htay (Myanmar)

2010-12-15; 18:44	Japan (JPN)	0–3	Iran (IRI)	Guangwai Gymnasium; Attendance: 520; Referees: Wang Jie (China PR)
2010-12-15; 18:44	(24–26, 18–25, 23–25)			Guangwai Gymnasium; Attendance: 520; Referees: Wang Jie (China PR)

=== Final round ===
==== Semi-finals ====
2010-12-17; 9:00	China (CHN)	3–0	Mongolia (MGL)	Guangwai Gymnasium; Attendance: 2,300; Referees: Mehdi Ashouri (Iran)
2010-12-17; 9:00	(25–6, 25–22, 25–10)			Guangwai Gymnasium; Attendance: 2,300; Referees: Mehdi Ashouri (Iran)

2010-12-17; 10:30	Iran (IRI)	1–3	Japan (JPN)	Guangwai Gymnasium; Attendance: 750; Referees: Jung Mal-Soon (South Korea)
2010-12-17; 10:30	(22–25, 23–25, 25–21, 29–31)			Guangwai Gymnasium; Attendance: 750; Referees: Jung Mal-Soon (South Korea)

==== Bronze-medal match ====
2010-12-18; 11:30	Mongolia (MGL)	0–3	Iran (IRI)	Guangwai Gymnasium; Attendance: 500; Referees: Wang Jie (China PR)
2010-12-18; 11:30	(11–25, 7–25, 12–25)			Guangwai Gymnasium; Attendance: 500; Referees: Wang Jie (China PR)

==== Gold-medal match ====
2010-12-18; 14:00	China (CHN)	3–1	Japan (JPN)	Guangwai Gymnasium; Attendance: 800; Referees: Leyli Tavakoli (Iran)
2010-12-18; 14:00	(25–10, 25–15, 22–25, 25–8)			Guangwai Gymnasium; Attendance: 800; Referees: Leyli Tavakoli (Iran)

=== Women's final standing ===
Rank	Nation
1st place, gold medalist(s)	China (CHN)
2nd place, silver medalist(s)	Japan (JPN)
3rd place, bronze medalist(s)	Iran (IRI)
4	Mongolia (MGL)
5	Pakistan (PAK)

== See also ==
- Volleyball at the 2010 Asian Games
