= Hassan Kordestani =

Iranian footballer

Personal information
- Full name: Hassan Kordestani
- Place of birth: Iran
- Position: Defender

Senior career*
Years	Team	Apps	(Gls)
1947–1949	Docharkheh Savaran		
1949–1951	Taj		

International career
1947–1951	Iran	4	(0)
- * Club domestic league appearances and goals

Hassan Kordestani is an Iranian football defender who played for Iran. He also played for Taj SC.
