= Daisuke Maeda =

Japanese Paralympic swimmer

Medal record

Swimming

Representing Japan

Paralympic Games
Silver medal – second place	2004 Athens	4 x 50 metre medley relay - 20 pts

Daisuke Maeda (前田 大介, Maeda Daisuke) is a Paralympic rower and swimmer from Japan competing mainly in single sculls and category S6 events.

Daisuke was a competitor at two Paralympic games, first in 2000 then in 2004. At the 2000 games he was part of the Japanese squads that failed to make the final of the 4 × 100 m freestyle and the 4 × 100 m medley. Individually he also failed to make the final in the 50m butterfly, 100m backstroke, 100m freestyle and 400m freestyle. He would have more luck in 2004 where the Japanese 4x50m medley squad won a silver medal behind the Brazilian squad that set a new Paralympic record, and also finished fourth in the 4x50m freestyle, individually he competed in the 50m butterfly, 50m freestyle and 100m freestyle but again failed to make any finals.
