= Kanako Domori =

Japanese wheelchair tennis player (born 1975)

Kanako Domori (堂森 佳南子, Dōmori Kanako; born June 18, 1975) is a Japanese wheelchair tennis player who won the British Open in 2014. She played in doubles along with Marc McCarroll of Great Britain.
