= France at the 2004 Summer Paralympics =

- IPC code: FRA
- NPC: French Paralympic and Sports Committee
- Website: france-paralympique.fr

in Athens
- Competitors: 136 in 14 sports
- Medals Ranked 9th: Gold 18 Silver 26 Bronze 30 Total 74

Summer Paralympics appearances (overview)
- 1960; 1964; 1968; 1972; 1976; 1980; 1984; 1988; 1992; 1996; 2000; 2004; 2008; 2012; 2016; 2020; 2024

France competed at the 2004 Summer Paralympics in Athens, Greece. The team included 136 athletes, 106 men and 30 women. French competitors won 74 medals, 18 gold, 26 silver and 30 bronze to finish 9th in the medal table.

== Medallists ==
Medal	Name	Sport	Event
Gold	Joel Jeannot	Athletics	Men's 10000m T54
Gold	Assia El Hannouni	Athletics	Women's 100m T12
Gold	Assia El Hannouni	Athletics	Women's 200m T12
Gold	Assia El Hannouni	Athletics	Women's 400m T12
Gold	Assia El Hannouni	Athletics	Women's 800m T12
Gold	Laurent Thirionet	Cycling	Men's bicycle 2 km individual pursuit LC3
Gold	Cyril Jonard	Judo	Men's 81 kg
Gold	Karima Medjeded	Judo	Women's 48 kg
Gold	Damien Seguin	Sailing	Mixed 2.4m (1 person)
Gold	Pascal Pinard	Swimming	Men's 100m breaststroke SB4
Gold	Béatrice Hess	Swimming	Women's 200m freestyle S5
Gold	Ludivine Loiseau	Swimming	Women's 50m butterfly S6
Gold	Béatrice Hess	Swimming	Women's 100m breaststroke SB4
Gold	Stephane Messi	Table tennis	Men's singles class 7
Gold	Isabelle Lafaye Marziou	Table tennis	Women's singles class 1-2
Gold	Genevieve Clot; Isabelle Lafaye Marziou; Stephanie Mariage	Table tennis	Women's team class 1-3
Gold	Cyril More	Wheelchair fencing	Men's épée individual A
Gold	Robert Citerne; Alim Latreche; David Maillard; Cyril More	Wheelchair fencing	Men's épée team open
Silver	Gautier Makunda	Athletics	Men's 100m T11
Silver	Clavel Kayitare	Athletics	Men's 100m T42
Silver	Clavel Kayitare	Athletics	Men's 200m T42
Silver	Sebastien Barc	Athletics	Men's 200m T46
Silver	Dominique Andre; Sebastien Barc; Xavier le Draoullec; Serge Ornem	Athletics	Men's 4 × 100 m relay T42-46
Silver	Pierre Fairbank; Claude Issorat; Joel Jeannot; Eric Teurnier	Athletics	Men's 4 × 400 m relay T53/54
Silver	Laurent Thirionet	Cycling	Men's bicycle road race/time trial LC3
Silver	Laurent Thirionet	Cycling	Men's bicycle 1 km time trial LC1-4
Silver	Frederic Janowski; Patrice Senmartin	Cycling	Men's tandem 1 km time trial B1-3
Silver	Sandrine Aurières	Judo	Women's 52 kg
Silver	Souhad Ghazouani	Powerlifting	Women's 60 kg
Silver	Carine Burgy	Powerlifting	Women's 82.5 kg
Silver	Philippe Revillon	Swimming	Men's 50m freestyle S2
Silver	Béatrice Hess	Swimming	Women's 50m freestyle S5
Silver	Ludivine Loiseau	Swimming	Women's 50m freestyle S6
Silver	Béatrice Hess	Swimming	Women's 100m freestyle S5
Silver	Ludivine Loiseau	Swimming	Women's 100m freestyle S6
Silver	Béatrice Hess	Swimming	Women's 50m backstroke S5
Silver	Ludivine Loiseau	Swimming	Women's 100m backstroke S6
Silver	Jean Philippe Robin	Table tennis	Men's singles class 3
Silver	Bruno Benedetti; Emeric Martin; Sebastien Pechard	Table tennis	Men's team class 4
Silver	Alain Pichon; Michel Schaller; Julien Soyer	Table tennis	Men's team class 8
Silver	Olivier Chateigner; Gilles de la Bourdonnaye; François Serignat	Table tennis	Men's team class 10
Silver	Genevieve Clot	Table tennis	Women's singles class 1-2
Silver	Stephanie Mariage	Table tennis	Women's singles class 3
Silver	Michaël Jérémiasz; Lahcen Majdi	Wheelchair tennis	Men's doubles
Bronze	Sebastien Barc	Athletics	Men's 100m T46
Bronze	Aladji Ba	Athletics	Men's 400m T11
Bronze	Pierre Fairbank; Ludovic Gapenne; Claude Issorat; Hubert Locco	Athletics	Men's 4 × 100 m relay T53/54
Bronze	Dominique Andre; Sebastien Barc; Xavier le Draoullec; Emmanuel Lacroix	Athletics	Men's 4 × 400 m relay T42-46
Bronze	Arnaud Assoumani	Athletics	Men's long jump F46
Bronze	Thierry Cibone	Athletics	Men's shot put F35
Bronze	Thierry Cibone	Athletics	Men's javelin throw F35
Bronze	Michel Alcaine	Cycling	Men's bicycle road race/time trial LC1
Bronze	David Mercier; Patrick Ceria; Laurent Thirionet	Cycling	Men's bicycle team sprint LC1-4 & CP 3/4
Bronze	Sebastien le Meaux	Judo	Men's 100 kg
Bronze	Angelique Quessandier	Judo	Women's 63 kg
Bronze	David Smetanine	Swimming	Men's 50m freestyle S4
Bronze	Philippe Revillon	Swimming	Men's 100m freestyle S2
Bronze	Philippe Revillon	Swimming	Men's 200m freestyle S2
Bronze	Pascal Pinard	Swimming	Men's 50m butterfly S5
Bronze	Eric Lindmann	Swimming	Men's 100m breaststroke SB6
Bronze	Eric Lindmann	Swimming	Men's 100m backstroke S7
Bronze	Pascal Pinard	Swimming	Men's 200m individual medley SM5
Bronze	Eric Lindmann	Swimming	Men's 200m individual medley SM7
Bronze	Anne Cecile Lequien	Swimming	Women's 50m butterfly S4
Bronze	Anne Cecile Lequien	Swimming	Women's 50m backstroke S4
Bronze	Christophe Durand	Table tennis	Men's singles class 5
Bronze	Pascal Verger; Jean Philippe Robin	Table tennis	Men's team class 3
Bronze	Christophe Durand; Gregory Rosec	Table tennis	Men's team class 5
Bronze	Thu Kamkasomphou	Table tennis	Women's singles class 9
Bronze	Thu Kamkasomphou; Claire Mairie; Audrey le Morvan; Michelle Sevin	Table tennis	Women's team class 6-10
Bronze	Pascal Durand; Moez El Assine; Cyril More	Wheelchair fencing	Men's sabre team open
Bronze	Emmanuelle Assmann; Sylvie Magnat; Sylvaine Meyer; Patricia Picot	Wheelchair fencing	Women's épée team open
Bronze	Patricia Picot	Wheelchair fencing	Women's foil individual A
Bronze	Michaël Jérémiasz	Wheelchair tennis	Men's singles

== Sports ==
=== Archery ===
==== Men ====
Athlete	Event	Ranking round		Round of 32	Round of 16	Quarterfinals	Semifinals	Finals	
Athlete	Event	Score	Seed	Opposition score	Opposition score	Opposition score	Opposition score	Opposition score	Rank
Charles Est	Men's individual W2	572	22	Gilbert (FRA); W 139-138	Sidik (MAS); L 149-157	did not advance			
Stephane Gilbert	Men's individual W2	602	11	Est (FRA); L 138-139	did not advance				
Olivier Hatem	Men's individual W1	628	4	Bye		Cavanagh (GBR); L 102-93	did not advance		
Eddy Gobbato	Men's individual standing	574	17	Zhu (CHN); L 136-143	did not advance				
Olivier Hatem; Eddy Gobbato; Stephane Gilbert	Men's team	1804	7	N/A	Italy (ITA); L 197-197 *	did not advance			

In the men's round of 16 against Italy, a zero score was recorded due to the infringement of IPC rules in which the French team lost and Italy went onto the quarterfinals against the United States.

=== Athletics ===
==== Men's track ====
Athlete	Class	Event	Heats		Semifinal		Final	
Athlete	Class	Event	Result	Rank	Result	Rank	Result	Rank
Dominique Andre	T44	100m	11.71	4 Q	—N/a		11.66	4
Dominique Andre	T44	200m	24.61	7 Q	—N/a		23.87	8
Aladji Ba	T11	200m	24.16	8 q	24.41	12	did not advance	
Aladji Ba	T11	400m	52.62	2 Q	52.97	3 Q	52.46	3rd place, bronze medalist(s)
Sebastien Barc	T46	100m	11.20	4 Q	—N/a		11.13	3rd place, bronze medalist(s)
Sebastien Barc	T46	200m	22.64	5 Q	—N/a		22.62	2nd place, silver medalist(s)
Pierre Fairbank	T53	200m	27.03	6 Q	—N/a		28.27	8
Pierre Fairbank	T53	800m	1:39.55	2 Q	—N/a		1:38.99	4
Alain Fuss	T54	5000m	10:30.23	16	did not advance			
Alain Fuss	T54	10000m	21:09.64	6 Q	—N/a		20:53.74	6
Alain Fuss	T54	Marathon	—N/a				1:35:32	11
Ludovic Gapenne	T54	1500m	3:09.15	20	did not advance			
Claude Issorat	T54	100m	14.77	6 q	14.87	5	did not advance	
Claude Issorat	T54	200m	26.01	8 Q	—N/a		26.12	7
Claude Issorat	T54	800m	1:34.94	2 Q	—N/a		1:32.95	6
Joel Jeannot	T54	1500m	3:00.17 PR	1 Q	3:05.11	6 Q	3:06.38	9
Joel Jeannot	T54	5000m	10:24.37 PR	1 Q	—N/a		10:25.35	5
Joel Jeannot	T54	10000m	21:47.79	12	—N/a		20:51.86 PR	1st place, gold medalist(s)
Joel Jeannot	T54	Marathon	—N/a				1:31:42	5
Clavel Kayitare	T42	100m	—N/a				12.78	2nd place, silver medalist(s)
Clavel Kayitare	T42	200m	—N/a				26.64	2nd place, silver medalist(s)
Emmanuel Lacroix	T46	800m	2:02.95	6 Q	—N/a		1:59.07	4
Emmanuel Lacroix	T46	1500m	—N/a				4:14.71	12
Emmanuel Lacroix	T46	5000m	—N/a				15:59.95	14
Denis Lemeunier	T54	10000m	21:52.04	18	did not advance			
Denis Lemeunier	T54	Marathon	—N/a				1:37:41	14
Hubert Locco	T54	100m	15.33	25	did not advance			
Hubert Locco	T54	200m	27.23	16	did not advance			
Gautier Makunda	T11	100m	11.60	2 Q	11.75	2 Q	11.71	2nd place, silver medalist(s)
Gautier Makunda	T11	200m	DNS		did not advance			
Serge Ornem	T46	100m	11.10	3 Q	—N/a		11.15	4
Serge Ornem	T46	200m	22.53	4 Q	—N/a		22.86	4
Ronan Pallier	T13	100m	11.63	11	did not advance			
Hugues Quiatol	T35	100m	13.68	4 Q	—N/a		13.83	5
Hugues Quiatol	T35	200m	—N/a				29.21	4
Lamouri Rahmouni	T37	200m	26.15	9	did not advance			
Lamouri Rahmouni	T37	400m	—N/a				56.17	4
Lamouri Rahmouni	T37	800m	2:23.00	9	did not advance			
Eric Teurnier	T54	800m	1:39.65	17	did not advance			
Eric Teurnier	T54	1500m	3:09.46	21	did not advance			
Eric Teurnier	T54	5000m	10:32.75	19	did not advance			
Charles Tolle	T53	200m	DNS		did not advance			
Charles Tolle	T53	800m	1:44.55	9	did not advance			
Aladji Ba; Stephane Bozzolo; Gautier Makunda; Ronan Pallier	T11-13	4 × 100 m relay	DNS		did not advance			
Dominique Andre; Sebastien Barc; Xavier le Draoullec; Serge Ornem	T42-46	4 × 100 m relay	—N/a				43.94	2nd place, silver medalist(s)
Pierre Fairbank; Ludovic Gapenne; Claude Issorat; Hubert Locco	T53-54	4 × 100 m relay	53.24	2 Q	—N/a		53.36	3rd place, bronze medalist(s)
Dominique Andre; Sebastien Barc; Xavier le Draoullec; Emmanuel Lacroix	T42-46	4 × 400 m relay	—N/a				3:37.28	3rd place, bronze medalist(s)
Pierre Fairbank; Claude Issorat; Joel Jeannot; Eric Teurnier	T53-54	4 × 400 m relay	3:15.26	2 Q	—N/a		3:14.08	2nd place, silver medalist(s)

==== Men's field ====
Athlete	Class	Event	Final		
Athlete	Class	Event	Result	Points	Rank
Arnaud Assoumani	F44/46	High jump	1.80	-	8
Arnaud Assoumani	F46	Long jump	6.91	-	3rd place, bronze medalist(s)
Arnaud Assoumani	F46	Triple jump	12.84	-	7
Stephane Bozzolo	F12	Javelin	47.39	-	8
Stephane Bozzolo	F12	Long jump	6.91	-	5
Stephane Bozzolo	F12	Triple jump	DNS		
Stephane Bozzolo	P13	Pentathlon	DNF		
Thierry Cibone	F35	Discus	40.22	-	4
Thierry Cibone	F35	Javelin	41.73	-	3rd place, bronze medalist(s)
Thierry Cibone	F35	Shot put	13.43	-	3rd place, bronze medalist(s)
Xavier le Draoullec	F44	Long jump	5.79	-	5
Xavier le Draoullec	P44	Pentathlon	3831		6
Ronan Pallier	F13	Long jump	6.39	-	5
Philippe Ramon	F44	Long jump	5.04	-	7
Philippe Ramon	F44/46	Discus	35.80	716	10
Philippe Ramon	P44	Pentathlon	3625		7
Pasilione Tafliagi	F42	Discus	41.03	-	5
Pasilione Tafliagi	F42	Shot put	11.44	-	7

==== Women's track ====
Athlete	Class	Event	Heats		Semifinal		Final	
Athlete	Class	Event	Result	Rank	Result	Rank	Result	Rank
Assia El Hannouni	T12	100m	13.01	3 Q	12.99	3 Q	12.32 WR	1st place, gold medalist(s)
Assia El Hannouni	T12	200m	24.99 WR	1 Q	25.53	1 Q	25.12	1st place, gold medalist(s)
Assia El Hannouni	T12	400m	56.15 WR	1 Q	57.15	1 Q	53.67 WR	1st place, gold medalist(s)
Assia El Hannouni	T12	800m	2:17.96	1 Q	—N/a		2:07.89 WR	1st place, gold medalist(s)

==== Women's field ====
Athlete	Class	Event	Final		
Athlete	Class	Event	Result	Points	Rank
Patricia Marquis	F40	Discus	14.98	-	8
Patricia Marquis	F40	Javelin	12.59	-	7
Patricia Marquis	F40	Shot put	5.01	-	8

=== Cycling ===
==== Men's road ====
Athlete	Event	Time	Rank
Michel Alcaine	Men's road race / time trial CP div 4	1:48:25	3rd place, bronze medalist(s)
Patrick Ceria	Men's road race / time trial LC2	-	5
David Mercier	Men's road race / time trial LC1	-	4
Sebastien Serriere	Men's road race / time trial LC2	-	8
Laurent Thirionet	Men's road race / time trial LC3	-	2nd place, silver medalist(s)
Alexandre Bizet; Olivier Donval	Men's road race / time trial tandem B1-3	3:07:35	6

==== Men's track ====
Athlete	Event	Qualification		1st round		Final	
Athlete	Event	Time	Rank	Time	Rank	Opposition Time	Rank
Michel Alcaine	Men's 1km time trial CP div 3/4	—N/a				1:18.99	13
Michel Alcaine	Men's individual pursuit CP div 4	4:13.75	10	did not advance			
Patrick Ceria	Men's 1km time trial LC1-4	DNS					
David Mercier	Men's 1km time trial LC1-4	—N/a				1:15.29	22
David Mercier	Men's individual pursuit LC1	5:14.07	8 Q	Brooks (AUS); L OVL	-	did not advance	
Laurent Thirionet	Men's 1km time trial LC1-4	—N/a				1:08.96	2nd place, silver medalist(s)
Laurent Thirionet	Men's individual pursuit LC3	4:12.87	4 Q	Gemassmer (ITA); W 4:02.96	1 Q	Graf (GER); W 4:02.81 PR	1st place, gold medalist(s)
Alexandre Bizet; Olivier Donval	Men's individual pursuit tandem B1-3	4:49.42	13	did not advance			
Patrice Senmartin; Frederic Janowski	Men's 1km time trial tandem B1-3	—N/a				1:05.40	2nd place, silver medalist(s)
Patrice Senmartin; Frederic Janowski	Men's sprint tandem B1-3	11.113	7 Q	Biddle (AUS); Stewart (AUS); L 0-2	-	Oshiro (JPN); Tanzawa (JPN); L	8
Patrick Ceria; David Mercier; Laurent Thirionet	Men's team sprint LC1-4/ CP 3/4	57.439	3	Spain (ESP); W 57.105	4 q	Germany (GER); W 56.611	3rd place, bronze medalist(s)

=== Equestrian ===
Athlete	Event	Total	
Athlete	Event	Score	Rank
Nathalie Bizet	Individual championship test grade IV	67.419	6
Nathalie Bizet	Individual freestyle test grade IV	70.500	8
Jose Letartre	Individual championship test grade III	70.160	5
Jose Letartre	Individual freestyle test grade III	73.056	5
Valerie Salles	Individual championship test grade I	DNS	

=== Football 5-a-side ===
The men's football 5-a-side team didn't win any medals: they were 5th out of 6 teams.

==== Players ====
- Philippe Amaouche
- Marc Bolivard
- Bouchaib El Boukhari
- Odile Gerfaut
- Abderrahim Maya
- Cedric Moreau
- Sebastien Munos
- Frederic Villeroux

==== Results ====
Game	Match	Score	Rank
1	France vs. Brazil (BRA)	0 – 4	5
2	France vs. Argentina (ARG)	0 – 3	5
3	France vs. Spain (ESP)	0 – 2	5
4	France vs. Greece (GRE)	2 – 2	5
5	France vs. South Korea (KOR)	2 – 1	5
5th-6th classification	France vs. South Korea (KOR)	3 – 1	5

=== Judo ===
==== Men ====
Athlete	Event	Preliminary	Quarterfinals	Semifinals	Repechage round 1	Repechage round 2	Final/ Bronze medal contest
Athlete	Event	Opposition Result	Opposition Result	Opposition Result	Opposition Result	Opposition Result	Opposition Result
Olivier Cugnon	Men's 90kg	Bye	Miyauchi (JPN); W 1011S-0001S	Nine (ALG); L KG	—N/a		Fernández (ESP); L FG
Didier Fargeau	Men's 60kg	Bye	Lee (TPE); L 0020–0200C	—N/a	Biro (HUN); L 0000-0200	did not advance	
Cyril Jonard	Men's 81kg	White (IRL); W 1000-0000	Lopez (USA); W 1010-0000	Vlasov (RUS); W 0200-0000	—N/a		Kato (JPN); W 1000-0000 (gold)
Sebastien Le Meaux	Men's 100kg	Tenorio (BRA); L 0001C-0011S	—N/a		Lyvytskyy (UKR); W 0100C-0010K	Papachristos (GRE); W 0110S-0101K	Dahmen (GER); W 1000-0000 (bronze)
Gerald Rollo	Men's 73kg	Bye	Krieger (GER); L 0002C-1001S	—N/a	Sydorenko (UKR); L 0001S-1011S	did not advance	
Julien Taurines	Men's +100kg	Osewald (GER); L 0001-0130S	did not advance				

- KG – Kiken-gachi – win by withdrawal
- FG – Fusen-gachi – win by default

==== Women ====
Athlete	Event	Quarterfinals	Semifinals	Repechage round 1	Final/ Bronze medal contest
Athlete	Event	Opposition Result	Opposition Result	Opposition Result	Opposition Result
Sandrine Aurières	Women's 52kg	Wang (CHN); W 1100-0000	Vlasova (RUS); W 1010-0000	—N/a	Schuetzel (GER); L 0000-1021 (silver)
Karima Medjeded	Women's 48kg	Skandii (GRE); W 1100-0001	Potapova (RUS); W 1000–0010	—N/a	Cardoso (BRA); W 1010S-0001 (gold)
Angelique Quessandier	Women's 63kg	Kazakova (RUS); L 0001S-1001S	—N/a		Ingram (GBR); W 1000-0000 (bronze)

=== Powerlifting ===
Athlete	Event	Result	Rank
Carine Burgy	82.5kg	130.0	2nd place, silver medalist(s)
Souhad Ghazouani	60kg	120.0	2nd place, silver medalist(s)
Martine Servajean	52kg	85.0	5

=== Shooting ===
==== Men ====
Athlete	Event	Qualification		Final		
Athlete	Event	Score	Rank	Score	Total	Rank
Tanguy de la Forest	Mixed 10m air rifle prone SH2	594	20	did not advance		
Tanguy de la Forest	Mixed 10m air rifle standing SH2	592	12	did not advance		
Cedric Friggeri	Mixed 10m air rifle prone SH1	596	22	did not advance		
Cedric Friggeri	Men's 10m air rifle standing SH1	580	13	did not advance		
Cedric Friggeri	Mixed 50m rifle prone SH1	586	7	98.4	684.4	8
Cedric Friggeri	Men's 50m three positions SH1	1125	11	did not advance		
Didier Richard	Mixed 10m air rifle prone SH1	597	14	did not advance		

=== Swimming ===
==== Men ====
Athlete	Class	Event	Heats		Final	
Athlete	Class	Event	Result	Rank	Result	Rank
Gaetan Dautresire	S4	100m freestyle	1:53.42	12	did not advance	
Gaetan Dautresire	S4	200m freestyle	3:49.35	12	did not advance	
Gaetan Dautresire	S4	50m backstroke	54.04	7 Q	53.06	5
Christophe Deteix	S12	100m backstroke	1:28.80	13	did not advance	
Christophe Deteix	SB12	100m breaststroke	1:23.80	10	did not advance	
Eric Lindmann	S7	100m backstroke	1:21.04	5 Q	1:17.97	3rd place, bronze medalist(s)
Eric Lindmann	SB6	100m breaststroke	N/A		1:33.57	3rd place, bronze medalist(s)
Eric Lindmann	SM7	200m individual medley	2:53.68	5 Q	2:48.46	3rd place, bronze medalist(s)
Pascal Pinard	S5	50m backstroke	43.13	5 Q	42.67	4
Pascal Pinard	S5	50m butterfly	40.26	4 Q	39.94	3rd place, bronze medalist(s)
Pascal Pinard	SB4	100m breaststroke	1:43.25	1 Q	1:40.22	1st place, gold medalist(s)
Pascal Pinard	SM5	200m individual medley	3:18.32	3 Q	3:12.55	3rd place, bronze medalist(s)
Emmanuel Provost	S12	50m freestyle	26.80	8 Q	26.71	8
Emmanuel Provost	S12	100m freestyle	1:00.46	14	did not advance	
Emmanuel Provost	S12	100m backstroke	1:09.82	8 Q	1:09.36	8 Q
Emmanuel Provost	S12	100m butterfly	1:10.49	10	did not advance	
Emmanuel Provost	SB12	100m breaststroke	1:19.97	11	did not advance	
Philippe Revillon	S2	50m freestyle	1:09.46	2 Q	1:09.18	2nd place, silver medalist(s)
Philippe Revillon	S2	100m freestyle	2:36.26	3 Q	2:29.07	3rd place, bronze medalist(s)
Philippe Revillon	S2	200m freestyle	5:33.41	2 Q	5:23.63	3rd place, bronze medalist(s)
David Smetanine	S4	50m freestyle	41.75	5 Q	39.51	3rd place, bronze medalist(s)
David Smetanine	S4	100m freestyle	1:29.53	4 Q	1:28.98	4
David Smetanine	S4	200m freestyle	3:10.67	4 Q	3:12.81	4
Gaetan Dautresire; Eric Lindmann; Pascal Pinard; David Smetanine	N/A	4 × 50 m freestyle relay (20pts)	2:48.06	7 Q	2:47.01	7
Gaetan Dautresire; Eric Lindmann; Pascal Pinard; David Smetanine	N/A	4 × 50 m medley relay (20pts)	2:57.47	6 Q	2:58.07	7

==== Women ====
Athlete	Class	Event	Heats		Final	
Athlete	Class	Event	Result	Rank	Result	Rank
Emilie Gral	S9	100m backstroke	1:22.34	10	did not advance	
Emilie Gral	S9	100m butterfly	1:17.03	3 Q	1:17.06	4
Emilie Gral	SB9	100m breaststroke	1:33.81	10	did not advance	
Emilie Gral	SM9	200m individual medley	2:48.74	3 Q	2:48.96	4
Béatrice Hess	S5	50m freestyle	39.28	4 Q	37.53	2nd place, silver medalist(s)
Béatrice Hess	S5	100m freestyle	1:21.56	3 Q	1:20.46	2nd place, silver medalist(s)
Béatrice Hess	S5	200m freestyle	2:52.33	1 Q	2:49.99	1st place, gold medalist(s)
Béatrice Hess	S5	50m backstroke	44.29	2 Q	43.74	2nd place, silver medalist(s)
Béatrice Hess	SB4	100m breaststroke	2:00.94	1 Q	1:59.38	1st place, gold medalist(s)
Anne Cecile Lequien	S4	50m freestyle	55.35	5 Q	54.32	6
Anne Cecile Lequien	S4	100m freestyle	1:55.37	7 Q	1:53.27	5
Anne Cecile Lequien	S4	200m freestyle	4:10.82	5 Q	3:58.54	5
Anne Cecile Lequien	S4	50m backstroke	54.05	3 Q	53.37	3rd place, bronze medalist(s)
Anne Cecile Lequien	S4	50m butterfly	N/A		1:07.91	3rd place, bronze medalist(s)
Ludivine Loiseau	S6	50m freestyle	38.67	3 Q	36.43	2nd place, silver medalist(s)
Ludivine Loiseau	S6	100m freestyle	1:24.10	3 Q	1:19.52	2nd place, silver medalist(s)
Ludivine Loiseau	S6	100m backstroke	1:36.93	3 Q	1:33.94	2nd place, silver medalist(s)
Ludivine Loiseau	S6	50m butterfly	41.59	1 Q	40.25	1st place, gold medalist(s)
Ludivine Loiseau	SM6	200m individual medley	3:31.53	3 Q	3:27.26	4

=== Table tennis ===
==== Men ====
Athlete	Event	Preliminaries				Round of 16	Quarterfinals	Semifinals	Final / BM	
Athlete	Event	Opposition Result	Opposition Result	Opposition Result	Rank	Opposition Result	Opposition Result	Opposition Result	Opposition Result	Rank
Jean Yves Abbadie	Men's singles 6	Kowalski (POL); L 0-3	Blok (NED); L 0-3	Kusiak (GER); W 3-1	4	did not advance				
Bruno Benedetti	Men's singles 4	Caci (ITA); L 2-3	Sutter (SUI); W 3-2	Eid (EGY); W 3-2	3	did not advance				
Gilles de la Bourdonnaye	Men's singles 10	Vrbka (CZE); W 3-0	Vivanco (MEX); W 3-0	Khalil (JOR); W 3-0	1 Q	—N/a	Andersson (SWE); L 1-3	did not advance		
Vincent Boury	Men's singles 2	Kurkinen (FIN); L 0-3	Hajek (AUT); W 3-0	Mardani (IRI); W 3-0	2 Q	—N/a	Riapos (SVK); L 1-3	did not advance		
Olivier Chateigner	Men's singles 9	Fraczyk (AUT); W 3-2	Lu X (CHN); L 0-3	—N/a	3	did not advance				
Christophe Durand	Men's singles 5	Kwong K S (HKG); W 3-0	Robertson (GBR); W 3-1	—N/a	1 Q	Bye	Chang C J (TPE); W 3-2	Kim B Y (KOR); L 0-3	Kwong (HKG); W *	3rd place, bronze medalist(s)
Erwan Fouillen	Men's singles 1	Kilger (GER); L 1-3	Haylan (ARG); L 0-3	Cho J K (KOR); W 2-3	4	did not advance				
Emeric Martin	Men's singles 4	Ghion (BEL); L 1-3	Lis (POL); W 3-2	Park J Y (KOR); W 3-1	2 Q	Lin (TPE); W 3-0	Caci (ITA); W 3-1	Zhang N (CHN); L 3-1	Choi K S (KOR); L 1-3	4
Stephane Messi	Men's singles 7	Meyer (GER); W 3-0	Jurasz (POL); W 3-1	Bidnyy (UKR); W 3-1	1 Q	—N/a		Morales (ESP); W 3-0	Wollmert (GER); W 3-2	1st place, gold medalist(s)
Stephane Molliens	Men's singles 2	Kim K M (KOR); W 3-0	Minami (JPN); L 1-3	Kristjansson (ISL); W 3-1	1 Q	—N/a	Revucky (SVK); L 1-3	did not advance		
Alain Pichon	Men's singles 8	Frommelt (LIE); L 1-3	Vergeylen (BEL); L 1-3	Csonka (HUN); W 3-1	3	did not advance				
Sebastien Pechard	Men's singles 4	Kober (GER); W 3-1	Um T H (KOR); W 3-2	Zhang J (CHN); W 3-1	1 Q	Stefanu (CZE); L 1-3	did not advance			
Jean Philippe Robin	Men's singles 3	Trofan (GBR); W 3-0	Yang H S (KOR); W 3-0	da Silva (BRA); W 3-0	1 Q	Kylevik (SWE); W 3-0	Dollmann (AUT); W 3-0	Kesler (SCG); W 3-1	Kim Y G (KOR); L 0-3	2nd place, silver medalist(s)
Gregory Rosec	Men's singles 5	Urhaug (NOR); L 2-3	Taus (CZE); W 3-1	—N/a	2 Q	Lin Y H (TPE); L 0-3	did not advance			
Michel Schaller	Men's singles 8	Glikman (ISR); L 1-3	Skrzynecki (POL); W 3-2	Mitas (SVK); W 3-0	2 Q	Valera (ESP); W 3-0	Ledoux (BEL); L 2-3	did not advance		
François Serignat	Men's singles 9	Hsu C S (TPE); L 1-3	Gutdeutsch (AUT); W 3-0	Cinibulk (CZE); W 3-0	2 Q	Bye	Zborai (HUN); L 1-3	did not advance		
Marc Sorabella	Men's singles 2	Riapos (SVK); L 3-1	Vilsmaier (GER); W 3-1	Espindola (BRA); W 3-0	1 Q	—N/a	Kim G Y (KOR); L 2-3	did not advance		
Julien Soyer	Men's singles 8	Li M (CHN); L 1-3	Valera (ESP); L 1-3	Hu M F (TPE); L 0-3	4	did not advance				
Pascal Verger	Men's singles 3	Guertler (GER); L 0-3	Nars (EGY); W 3-2	Wolf (AUT); W 3-0	2 Q	Robinson (GBR); L 2-3	did not advance			

- – Kwong Kam Shing was disqualified after the excessive use of prohibited solvents on rackets; due to this, Christophe Durand was awarded the bronze medal.

==== Women ====
Athlete	Event	Preliminaries				Quarterfinals	Semifinals	Final / BM	
Athlete	Event	Opposition Result	Opposition Result	Opposition Result	Rank	Opposition Result	Opposition Result	Opposition Result	Rank
Genevieve Clot	Women's singles 1-2	Mitton (GBR); W 3-1	Al Bargouti (JOR); W 3–0	—N/a	1 Q	—N/a	Podda (ITA); W 3-1	Marziou (FRA); L 1-3	2nd place, silver medalist(s)
Bernadette Darvand	Women's singles 6-8	Bengtsson Kovacs (SWE); L 0-3	Ovsjannikova (RUS); L 0-3	Munoz (ARG); W 3-0	3	did not advance			
Valerie Gay	Women's singles 3	Kanova (SVK); L 1-3	Bartheidel (GER); W 3-1	—N/a	2 Q	Fukuzawa (JPN); W 3-0	Pintar (SLO); L 2-3	Kanova (SVK); L 0-3	4
Thu Kamkasomphou	Women's singles 9	Liu M L (CHN); L 0-3	Grzelak (POL); W 3-0	Muylaert (BEL); W 3-1	2 Q	—N/a	Lei L (CHN); L 2-3	Komleva (RUS); W 3-2	3rd place, bronze medalist(s)
Claire Mairie	Women's singles 9	Lei L (CHN); DNS	Komleva (RUS); L 0-3	Kavas (TUR); L 1-3	4	did not advance			
Stephanie Mariage	Women's singles 3	Fukuzawa (JPN); W 3-0	Paardekam (NED); W 3-0	M Y Silva (CUB); W 3-1	1 Q	Fujiwara (JPN); W 3-2	Kanova (SVK); W 3-2	Pintar (SLO); L 1-3	2nd place, silver medalist(s)
Isabelle Lafaye Marziou	Women's singles 1-2	Podda (ITA); W 3-1	Riding (GBR); W 3-0	Garcia Ble (MEX); W 3-0	1 Q	—N/a	Mitton (GBR); W 3-1	Clot (FRA); W 3-1	1st place, gold medalist(s)
Audrey le Morvan	Women's singles 10	Partyka (POL); L 0-3	Kudo (JPN); L 1-3	Zakova (CZE); L 2-3	4	did not advance			
Stephanie Palasse	Women's singles 5	Chen W H (CHN); L 0-3	Hsiao S C (TPE); L 1-3	Chan S L (HKG); W 3-0	2 Q	Pivarciova (CZE); L 1-3	did not advance		
Michelle Sevin	Women's singles 10	Matouskova (CZE); DNS	Li Y Q (CHN); L 0-3	Jagodzinska (POL); L 1-3	4	did not advance			

==== Men's teams ====
Athlete	Event	Preliminaries				Quarter finals	Semifinals	Final / BM	
Athlete	Event	Opposition Result	Opposition Result	Opposition Result	Rank	Opposition Result	Opposition Result	Opposition Result	Rank
Vincent Boury; Erwan Fouillen; Stephane Molliens; Marc Sorabella	Men's teams 1-2	Germany (GER); W 3-1	Austria (AUT); W 3-2	—N/a	1 Q	—N/a	Slovakia (SVK); L 1-3	Germany (GER); L 2-3	4
Jean Philippe Robin; Pascal Verger	Men's teams 3	South Korea (KOR); W 3-1	Spain (ESP); W 3-1	Slovakia (SVK); W 3-0	1 Q	—N/a	Great Britain (GBR); L 2-3	Germany (GER); W 3-0	3rd place, bronze medalist(s)
Bruno Benedetti; Emeric Martin; Sebastien Pechard	Men's teams 4	Germany (GER); W 3-0	Switzerland (SUI); W 3-2	Egypt (EGY); W 3-0	1 Q	—N/a	China (CHN); W 3-0	South Korea (KOR); L 2-3	1st place, gold medalist(s)
Christophe Durand; Gregory Rosec	Men's teams 5	Norway (NOR); W 3-1	Brazil (BRA); W 3-0	—N/a	1 Q	Serbia and Montenegro (SCG); W 3-1	Czech Republic (CZE); L 2-3	Chinese Taipei (TPE); W 3-1	3rd place, bronze medalist(s)
Jean Yves Abbadie; Stephane Messi	Men's teams 6-7	Denmark (DEN); W 3-1	Sweden (SWE); L 2-3	Netherlands (NED); W 3-1	1 Q	—N/a	Poland (POL); L 2-3	Denmark (DEN); L 2-3	4
Alain Pichon; Michel Schaller; Julien Soyer	Men's teams 8	Slovakia (SVK); W 3-0	South Africa (RSA); W 3-0	—N/a	1 Q	—N/a	China (CHN); W 3-0	Belgium (BEL); L 3-1	2nd place, silver medalist(s)
Charles de la Bourdonnaye; Olivier Chateigner; François Serignat	Men's teams 10	China (CHN); L 2-3	Spain (ESP); W 3-2	Israel (ISR); DNS	2 Q	—N/a	Czech Republic (CZE); W 3-1	China (CHN); L 1-3	2nd place, silver medalist(s)

==== Women's teams ====
Athlete	Event	Preliminaries					Quarterfinals	Semifinals	Final / BM	
Athlete	Event	Opposition Result	Opposition Result	Opposition Result	Opposition Result	Rank	Opposition Result	Opposition Result	Opposition Result	Rank
Genevieve Clot; Stephanie Mariage; Isabelle Lafaye Marziou	Women's teams 1-3	No preliminaries					—N/a	Japan (JPN); W 3-1	Great Britain (GBR); W/O	1st place, gold medalist(s)
Valerie Gay; Stephanie Palasse	Women's team 4-5	China (CHN); L 0-3	Slovenia (SLO); W 3-1	—N/a		2 Q	Mexico (MEX); W 3-1	Chinese Taipei (TPE); L 0-3	Jordan (JOR); L 1-3	4
Thu Kamkasomphou; Claire Mairie; Audrey le Morvan; Michelle Sevin	Women's team 6-10	China (CHN); L 0-3	Poland (POL); L 1-3	Russia (RUS); W 3-2	Czech Republic (CZE); W 3-1	—N/a				3rd place, bronze medalist(s)

=== Wheelchair fencing ===
==== Men ====
Athlete	Event	Qualification			Round of 16	Quarterfinal	Semifinal	Final / BM	
Athlete	Event	Opposition	Score	Rank	Opposition Score	Opposition Score	Opposition Score	Opposition Score	Rank
Robert Citerne	Men's épée A	Stanczuk (POL)	L 3-5	3 Q	Doeme (HUN); W 15-6	Stanczuk (POL); L 13-15	did not advance		
Robert Citerne	Men's épée A	Zhang (CHN)	L 5-5	3 Q	Doeme (HUN); W 15-6	Stanczuk (POL); L 13-15	did not advance		
Robert Citerne	Men's épée A	Ahner (GER)	W 5-3	3 Q	Doeme (HUN); W 15-6	Stanczuk (POL); L 13-15	did not advance		
Robert Citerne	Men's épée A	Almansouri (KUW)	L 5-5	3 Q	Doeme (HUN); W 15-6	Stanczuk (POL); L 13-15	did not advance		
Robert Citerne	Men's épée A	Sanchez (ESP)	W 5-1	3 Q	Doeme (HUN); W 15-6	Stanczuk (POL); L 13-15	did not advance		
Robert Citerne	Men's foil A	Pender (POL)	L 0-5	3 Q	Al Qallaf (KUW); L 5-15	did not advance			
Robert Citerne	Men's foil A	Kwong (HKG)	W 5-4	3 Q	Al Qallaf (KUW); L 5-15	did not advance			
Robert Citerne	Men's foil A	Peppas (GRE)	L 4-5	3 Q	Al Qallaf (KUW); L 5-15	did not advance			
Robert Citerne	Men's foil A	Rodriguez (USA)	W 5-0	3 Q	Al Qallaf (KUW); L 5-15	did not advance			
Pascal Durand	Men's foil B	Chung (HKG)	L 4-5	4 Q	Hui (HKG)	did not advance			
Pascal Durand	Men's foil B	Szekeres (HUN)	L 3-5	4 Q	Hui (HKG)	did not advance			
Pascal Durand	Men's foil B	Mari (ITA)	L 2-5	4 Q	Hui (HKG)	did not advance			
Pascal Durand	Men's foil B	Arnau (ESP)	W 5-0	4 Q	Hui (HKG)	did not advance			
Pascal Durand	Men's sabre B	Wysmierski (POL)	L 2-5	2 Q	Bye	Mayer (GER); W 15-5	Wysmierski (POL); L 15-5	Szekeres (HUN); L 11-15	4
Pascal Durand	Men's sabre B	Mayer (GER)	W 5-2	2 Q	Bye	Mayer (GER); W 15-5	Wysmierski (POL); L 15-5	Szekeres (HUN); L 11-15	4
Pascal Durand	Men's sabre B	Szekeres (HUN)	L 3-5	2 Q	Bye	Mayer (GER); W 15-5	Wysmierski (POL); L 15-5	Szekeres (HUN); L 11-15	4
Pascal Durand	Men's sabre B	Heaton (GBR)	W 5-4	2 Q	Bye	Mayer (GER); W 15-5	Wysmierski (POL); L 15-5	Szekeres (HUN); L 11-15	4
Pascal Durand	Men's sabre B	Bogdos (GRE)	W 5-3	2 Q	Bye	Mayer (GER); W 15-5	Wysmierski (POL); L 15-5	Szekeres (HUN); L 11-15	4
Pascal Durand	Men's sabre B	Shumate (USA)	W 5-1	2 Q	Bye	Mayer (GER); W 15-5	Wysmierski (POL); L 15-5	Szekeres (HUN); L 11-15	4
Moez El Assine	Men's foil A	Fung (HKG)	L 4-5	4 Q	Zhang (CHN); L 7-15	did not advance			
Moez El Assine	Men's foil A	Al Qallaf (KUW)	L 2-5	4 Q	Zhang (CHN); L 7-15	did not advance			
Moez El Assine	Men's foil A	Walisiewicz (POL)	L 3-5	4 Q	Zhang (CHN); L 7-15	did not advance			
Moez El Assine	Men's foil A	Serafini (ITA)	W 5-3	4 Q	Zhang (CHN); L 7-15	did not advance			
Moez El Assine	Men's foil A	Dulah (MAS)	W 5-1	4 Q	Zhang (CHN); L 7-15	did not advance			
Moez El Assine	Men's sabre A	Makowski (POL)	L 3-5	2 Q	Ahner (GER); W 15-1	Lipinski (GER); W 15-8	Makowski (POL); L 7-15	Jablonski (POL); L 7-15	4
Moez El Assine	Men's sabre A	Chan (HKG)	W 5-1	2 Q	Ahner (GER); W 15-1	Lipinski (GER); W 15-8	Makowski (POL); L 7-15	Jablonski (POL); L 7-15	4
Moez El Assine	Men's sabre A	Fernandez (ESP)	W 5-0	2 Q	Ahner (GER); W 15-1	Lipinski (GER); W 15-8	Makowski (POL); L 7-15	Jablonski (POL); L 7-15	4
Moez El Assine	Men's sabre A	Doeme (HUN)	W 5-3	2 Q	Ahner (GER); W 15-1	Lipinski (GER); W 15-8	Makowski (POL); L 7-15	Jablonski (POL); L 7-15	4
Moez El Assine	Men's sabre A	Khder (IRQ)	W 5-1	2 Q	Ahner (GER); W 15-1	Lipinski (GER); W 15-8	Makowski (POL); L 7-15	Jablonski (POL); L 7-15	4
Laurent François	Men's épée B	Hu (CHN)	L 2-5	5	did not advance				
Laurent François	Men's épée B	Shenkevych (UKR)	L 2-5	5	did not advance				
Laurent François	Men's épée B	Rodgers (USA)	L 2-5	5	did not advance				
Laurent François	Men's épée B	Wysmierski (POL)	L 2-5	5	did not advance				
Laurent François	Men's épée B	Heaton (GBR)	W 5-1	5	did not advance				
Laurent François	Men's foil B	Alsaedi (KUW)	W 5-3	1 Q	Mari (ITA); L 14-15	did not advance			
Laurent François	Men's foil B	Hu (CHN)	L 4-5	1 Q	Mari (ITA); L 14-15	did not advance			
Laurent François	Men's foil B	Komar (UKR)	W 5-2	1 Q	Mari (ITA); L 14-15	did not advance			
Laurent François	Men's foil B	Wong (HKG)	W 5-3	1 Q	Mari (ITA); L 14-15	did not advance			
Alim Latreche	Men's épée B	Mayer (GER)	L 1-5	4 Q	Wong (HKG); L 4-15	did not advance			
Alim Latreche	Men's épée B	Lewonowski (POL)	L 2-5	4 Q	Wong (HKG); L 4-15	did not advance			
Alim Latreche	Men's épée B	Wong (HKG)	W 5-3	4 Q	Wong (HKG); L 4-15	did not advance			
Alim Latreche	Men's épée B	Alsaedi (KUW)	W 5-4	4 Q	Wong (HKG); L 4-15	did not advance			
Alim Latreche	Men's épée B	Shumate (USA)	W 5-3	4 Q	Wong (HKG); L 4-15	did not advance			
Alim Latreche	Men's foil B	Czop (POL)	L 2-5	2 Q	Rodgers (USA); L 9-15	did not advance			
Alim Latreche	Men's foil B	Moreno (USA)	W 5-3	2 Q	Rodgers (USA); L 9-15	did not advance			
Alim Latreche	Men's foil B	Sarri (ITA)	W 5-4	2 Q	Rodgers (USA); L 9-15	did not advance			
Alim Latreche	Men's foil B	Bogdos (GRE)	W 5-2	2 Q	Rodgers (USA); L 9-15	did not advance			
David Maillard	Men's épée A	Pender (POL)	W 5-0	1 Q	Ahner (GER); L 14-15	did not advance			
David Maillard	Men's épée A	Doeme (HUN)	W 5-3	1 Q	Ahner (GER); L 14-15	did not advance			
David Maillard	Men's épée A	Zhang (CHN)	L 3-5	1 Q	Ahner (GER); L 14-15	did not advance			
David Maillard	Men's épée A	Kwong (HKG)	W 5-3	1 Q	Ahner (GER); L 14-15	did not advance			
David Maillard	Men's épée A	van der Wege (USA)	W 5-2	1 Q	Ahner (GER); L 14-15	did not advance			
David Maillard	Men's foil A	Zhang (CHN)	L 0-5	3 Q	Makowski (POL); W 15-13	Fung (HKG); L 2-15	did not advance		
David Maillard	Men's foil A	Pellegrini (ITA)	L 3-5	3 Q	Makowski (POL); W 15-13	Fung (HKG); L 2-15	did not advance		
David Maillard	Men's foil A	Almansouri (KUW)	W 5-4	3 Q	Makowski (POL); W 15-13	Fung (HKG); L 2-15	did not advance		
David Maillard	Men's foil A	Rodríguez (ESP)	W 5-1	3 Q	Makowski (POL); W 15-13	Fung (HKG); L 2-15	did not advance		
Cyril More	Men's épée A	Al Qallaf (KUW)	L 1-5	5 Q	Lipinski (GER); W 15-12	Pender (POL); W 15–12	Kwong (HKG); W 15–13	Stanczuk (POL); W 15–11	1st place, gold medalist(s)
Cyril More	Men's épée A	Lipinski (GER)	L 4-5	5 Q	Lipinski (GER); W 15-12	Pender (POL); W 15–12	Kwong (HKG); W 15–13	Stanczuk (POL); W 15–11	1st place, gold medalist(s)
Cyril More	Men's épée A	Jablonski (POL)	L 4-5	5 Q	Lipinski (GER); W 15-12	Pender (POL); W 15–12	Kwong (HKG); W 15–13	Stanczuk (POL); W 15–11	1st place, gold medalist(s)
Cyril More	Men's épée A	Tai (HKG)	L 4-5	5 Q	Lipinski (GER); W 15-12	Pender (POL); W 15–12	Kwong (HKG); W 15–13	Stanczuk (POL); W 15–11	1st place, gold medalist(s)
Cyril More	Men's épée A	Peppas (GRE)	W 5-1	5 Q	Lipinski (GER); W 15-12	Pender (POL); W 15–12	Kwong (HKG); W 15–13	Stanczuk (POL); W 15–11	1st place, gold medalist(s)
Cyril More	Men's épée A	Rodríguez (ESP)	W 5-3	5 Q	Lipinski (GER); W 15-12	Pender (POL); W 15–12	Kwong (HKG); W 15–13	Stanczuk (POL); W 15–11	1st place, gold medalist(s)
Cyril More	Men's sabre A	Jablonski (POL)	L 4-5	3 Q	Fernandez (ESP); W 15-8	Pellegrini (ITA); L 7-15	did not advance		
Cyril More	Men's sabre A	Tai (HKG)	L 4-5	3 Q	Fernandez (ESP); W 15-8	Pellegrini (ITA); L 7-15	did not advance		
Cyril More	Men's sabre A	Serafini (ITA)	W 5-1	3 Q	Fernandez (ESP); W 15-8	Pellegrini (ITA); L 7-15	did not advance		
Cyril More	Men's sabre A	Ahner (GER)	W 5-3	3 Q	Fernandez (ESP); W 15-8	Pellegrini (ITA); L 7-15	did not advance		
Cyril More	Men's sabre A	Dulah (MAS)	W 5-3	3 Q	Fernandez (ESP); W 15-8	Pellegrini (ITA); L 7-15	did not advance		

==== Women ====
Athlete	Event	Qualification			Round of 16	Quarterfinal	Semifinal	Final / BM	
Athlete	Event	Opposition	Score	Rank	Opposition Score	Opposition Score	Opposition Score	Opposition Score	Rank
Emmanuelle Assmann	Women's épée A	Krajnyak (HUN)	L 1-5	3 Q	Jurak (HUN); W 15-12	Fan (HKG); L 14–15	did not advance		
Emmanuelle Assmann	Women's épée A	Polasik (POL)	L 3-5	3 Q	Jurak (HUN); W 15-12	Fan (HKG); L 14–15	did not advance		
Emmanuelle Assmann	Women's épée A	Presutto (ITA)	W 5-2	3 Q	Jurak (HUN); W 15-12	Fan (HKG); L 14–15	did not advance		
Emmanuelle Assmann	Women's épée A	Gilmore (USA)	W 2-0	3 Q	Jurak (HUN); W 15-12	Fan (HKG); L 14–15	did not advance		
Emmanuelle Assmann	Women's épée A	Tani (JPN)	W 5-1	3 Q	Jurak (HUN); W 15-12	Fan (HKG); L 14–15	did not advance		
Emmanuelle Assmann	Women's foil A	Yu (HKG)	L 1-5	4 Q	Meyer (FRA); W 15-9	Krajnyak (HUN); L 2-15	did not advance		
Emmanuelle Assmann	Women's foil A	Trigilia (ITA)	L 2-5	4 Q	Meyer (FRA); W 15-9	Krajnyak (HUN); L 2-15	did not advance		
Emmanuelle Assmann	Women's foil A	Witos (POL)	L 4-5	4 Q	Meyer (FRA); W 15-9	Krajnyak (HUN); L 2-15	did not advance		
Emmanuelle Assmann	Women's foil A	Presutto (ITA)	W 5-4	4 Q	Meyer (FRA); W 15-9	Krajnyak (HUN); L 2-15	did not advance		
Emmanuelle Assmann	Women's foil A	Jurak (HUN)	L 4-5	4 Q	Meyer (FRA); W 15-9	Krajnyak (HUN); L 2-15	did not advance		
Sylvie Magnat	Women's épée B	Dani (HUN)	L 2-5	2 Q	Hassen Bey (ESP); L 14-15	did not advance			
Sylvie Magnat	Women's épée B	Weber Kranz (GER)	W 5-2	2 Q	Hassen Bey (ESP); L 14-15	did not advance			
Sylvie Magnat	Women's épée B	Wong (HKG)	W 5-2	2 Q	Hassen Bey (ESP); L 14-15	did not advance			
Sylvie Magnat	Women's épée B	de Mello (BRA)	W 5-4	2 Q	Hassen Bey (ESP); L 14-15	did not advance			
Sylvie Magnat	Women's foil B	Jana (THA)	L 0-5	3 Q	Stollwerck (GER); W 15-12	Dani (HUN); L 2-15	did not advance		
Sylvie Magnat	Women's foil B	Palfi (HUN)	L 1-5	3 Q	Stollwerck (GER); W 15-12	Dani (HUN); L 2-15	did not advance		
Sylvie Magnat	Women's foil B	Weber Kranz (GER)	W 5-2	3 Q	Stollwerck (GER); W 15-12	Dani (HUN); L 2-15	did not advance		
Sylvie Magnat	Women's foil B	Vettraino (ITA)	W 5-1	3 Q	Stollwerck (GER); W 15-12	Dani (HUN); L 2-15	did not advance		
Sylvaine Meyer	Women's épée A	Trigilia (ITA)	L 2-5	5 Q	Yu (HKG); L 5-15	did not advance			
Sylvaine Meyer	Women's épée A	Yu (HKG)	L 2-5	5 Q	Yu (HKG); L 5-15	did not advance			
Sylvaine Meyer	Women's épée A	Rossek (GER)	L 4-5	5 Q	Yu (HKG); L 5-15	did not advance			
Sylvaine Meyer	Women's épée A	Jurak (HUN)	L 4-5	5 Q	Yu (HKG); L 5-15	did not advance			
Sylvaine Meyer	Women's épée A	Frelik (POL)	W 5-2	5 Q	Yu (HKG); L 5-15	did not advance			
Sylvaine Meyer	Women's foil A	Krajnyak (HUN)	L 1-5	2 Q	Assmann (FRA); L 9-15	did not advance			
Sylvaine Meyer	Women's foil A	Polasik (POL)	W 5-2	2 Q	Assmann (FRA); L 9-15	did not advance			
Sylvaine Meyer	Women's foil A	Imeri (GER)	W 5-0	2 Q	Assmann (FRA); L 9-15	did not advance			
Sylvaine Meyer	Women's foil A	Alexander (USA)	W 5-1	2 Q	Assmann (FRA); L 9-15	did not advance			
Patricia Picot	Women's épée A	Fan (HKG)	L 3-5	2 Q	Imeri (GER); W 15-8	Yu (HKG); L 9-15	did not advance		
Patricia Picot	Women's épée A	Dagmara Witos (POL)	W 5-4	2 Q	Imeri (GER); W 15-8	Yu (HKG); L 9-15	did not advance		
Patricia Picot	Women's épée A	Imeri (GER)	W 5-4	2 Q	Imeri (GER); W 15-8	Yu (HKG); L 9-15	did not advance		
Patricia Picot	Women's épée A	Alexander (USA)	W 5-0	2 Q	Imeri (GER); W 15-8	Yu (HKG); L 9-15	did not advance		
Patricia Picot	Women's foil A	Fan (HKG)	L 0-5	2 Q	Presutto (ITA); W 15-4	Trigilia (ITA); W 15-14	Fan (HKG); L 14-15	Krajnyak (HUN); W 15-11	3rd place, bronze medalist(s)
Patricia Picot	Women's foil A	Rossek (GER)	W 5-3	2 Q	Presutto (ITA); W 15-4	Trigilia (ITA); W 15-14	Fan (HKG); L 14-15	Krajnyak (HUN); W 15-11	3rd place, bronze medalist(s)
Patricia Picot	Women's foil A	Frelik (POL)	W 5-1	2 Q	Presutto (ITA); W 15-4	Trigilia (ITA); W 15-14	Fan (HKG); L 14-15	Krajnyak (HUN); W 15-11	3rd place, bronze medalist(s)
Patricia Picot	Women's foil A	Gilmore (USA)	W 5-0	2 Q	Presutto (ITA); W 15-4	Trigilia (ITA); W 15-14	Fan (HKG); L 14-15	Krajnyak (HUN); W 15-11	3rd place, bronze medalist(s)
Patricia Picot	Women's foil A	Tani (JPN)	W 5-1	2 Q	Presutto (ITA); W 15-4	Trigilia (ITA); W 15-14	Fan (HKG); L 14-15	Krajnyak (HUN); W 15-11	3rd place, bronze medalist(s)

==== Teams ====
Athlete	Event	Quarterfinal	Semifinal	Final / BM	
Athlete	Event	Opposition Score	Opposition Score	Opposition Score	Rank
Robert Citerne; Alim Latreche; David Maillard; Cyril More	Men's épée team	Kuwait (KUW); W 45–39	Hong Kong (HKG); W 45–24	Poland (POL); W 45–43	1st place, gold medalist(s)
Pascal Durand; Moez El Assine; Laurent François; David Maillard	Men's foil team	Poland (POL); L 38-45	United States (USA); W 45-21	5th place classification Italy (ITA); L 39-45	6
Pascal Durand; Moez El Assine; Cyril More	Men's sabre team	Germany (GER); W 45-35	Poland (POL); L 39-45	Italy (ITA); W 45-44	3rd place, bronze medalist(s)
Emmanuelle Assmann; Sylvie Magnat; Sylvaine Meyer; Patricia Picot	Women's épée team	Italy (ITA); W 45-35	Hong Kong (HKG); L 29-45	Poland (POL); W 45-42	3rd place, bronze medalist(s)
Emmanuelle Assmann; Sylvie Magnat; Sylvaine Meyer; Patricia Picot	Women's foil team	Italy (ITA); W 45-41	Hungary (HUN); L 44-45	Poland (POL); L 44-45	4

=== Wheelchair tennis ===
==== Men ====
Athlete	Class	Event	Round of 64	Round of 32	Round of 16	Quarterfinals	Semifinals	Finals
Athlete	Class	Event	Opposition Result	Opposition Result	Opposition Result	Opposition Result	Opposition Result	Opposition Result
Jozef Felix	Open	Singles	Mistry (GBR); L 7–5, 3–6, 4–6	did not advance				
Laurent Fischer	Open	Singles	Tur (ESP); L 2–6, 2–6	did not advance				
Regis Harel	Open	Singles	Kwak (KOR); W 6–2, 6–1	Rydberg (USA); L 4–6, 1–6	did not advance			
Michaël Jérémiasz	Open	Singles	Peinsith (AUT); W/O	Quintero (USA); W 6–1, 6–0	Brychta (CZE); W 6–3, 6–2	Kruszelnicki (POL); W 7–5, 6–1	Hall (AUS); L 1–6, 1–6	Bronze medal match Welch (USA); W 6–2, 6–4 (bronze)
Lahcen Majdi	Open	Singles	Greer (USA); W 6–2, 7–5	Shevchick (RUS); W 4–6, 6–1, 6–1	Ammerlaan (NED); L 0–6, 1–6	did not advance		
Laurent Fischer; Regis Harel	Open	Doubles	—N/a		Greer (USA) / Welch (USA); L 1–6, 3–6	did not advance		
Michaël Jérémiasz; Lahcen Majdi	Open	Doubles	—N/a		Rydberg (USA) / Quintero (USA); W 6–2, 6–4	Olsson (SWE) / Wikstrom (SWE); W 6–1, 6–2	Ammerlaan (NED) / Stuurman (NED); W 6–2, 6–2	Kunieda (JPN) / Saida (JPN); L 1–6, 2–6 (silver)

==== Women ====
Athlete	Class	Event	Round of 32	Round of 16	Quarterfinals	Semifinals	Finals
Athlete	Class	Event	Opposition Result	Opposition Result	Opposition Result	Opposition Result	Opposition Result
Armelle Fabre	Open	Singles	Di Toro (AUS); L 3–6, 1–6	did not advance			
Florence Gravellier	Open	Singles	Yaosa (JPN); W 6–1, 6–2	Bartczak (POL); W 6–1, 6–0	Kalt (SUI); W 6–2, 6–1	Vergeer (NED); L 3–6, 1–6	Bronze medal match Di Toro (AUS); L 6–1, 2–6, 2–6
Armelle Fabre; Florence Gravellier	Open	Doubles	—N/a	Blake (GBR) / McMorran (GBR); W 6–3, 6–2	Smit (NED) / Vergeer (NED); L 2–6, 3–6	did not advance	

== See also ==
- France at the Paralympics
- France at the 2004 Summer Olympics
