= Poland at the 2004 Summer Paralympics =

- IPC code: POL
- NPC: Polish Paralympic Committee
- Website: www.paralympic.org.pl

in Athens
- Competitors: 104 in 10 sports
- Medals Ranked 18th: Gold 10 Silver 25 Bronze 19 Total 54

Summer Paralympics appearances (overview)
- 1972; 1976; 1980; 1984; 1988; 1992; 1996; 2000; 2004; 2008; 2012; 2016; 2020; 2024

Poland competed at the 2004 Summer Paralympics in Athens, Greece. The team included 104 athletes, 70 men and 34 women. Competitors from Poland won 54 medals, including 10 gold, 25 silver and 19 bronze to finish 18th in the medal table.

== Medallists ==
| Medal | Name | Sport | Event |
|---|---|---|---|
| Gold | Pawel Piotrowski | Athletics | Men's shot put F36 |
| Gold | Tomasz Blatkiewicz | Athletics | Men's shot put F37 |
| Gold | Krzysztof Smorszczewski | Athletics | Men's shot put F56 |
| Gold | Tomasz Blatkiewicz | Athletics | Men's discus throw F37 |
| Gold | Renata Chilewska | Athletics | Women's javelin throw F35-38 |
| Gold | Katarzyna Pawlik | Swimming | Women's 400m freestyle S10 |
| Gold | Magdalena Szczepinska | Swimming | Women's 100m butterfly S10 |
| Gold | Joanna Mendak | Swimming | Women's 100m butterfly S12 |
| Gold | Natalia Partyka | Table tennis | Women's singles class 10 |
| Gold | Robert Wymsierski | Wheelchair fencing | Men's sabre individual B |
| Silver | Tomasz Lezanski | Archery | Men's individual standing |
| Silver | Lukasz Labuch | Athletics | Men's 100m T37 |
| Silver | Janusz Rokicki | Athletics | Men's shot put F58 |
| Silver | Miroslaw Pych | Athletics | Men's javelin throw F12 |
| Silver | Pawel Piotrowski | Athletics | Men's javelin throw F36/38 |
| Silver | Anna Szymul | Athletics | Women's 100m T46 |
| Silver | Anna Szymul | Athletics | Women's 200m T46 |
| Silver | Anna Szymul | Athletics | Women's 400m T46 |
| Silver | Renata Chilewska | Athletics | Women's shot put F35/36 |
| Silver | Ryszard Rogala | Powerlifting | Men's 90 kg |
| Silver | Grzegorz Polkowski | Swimming | Men's 50m freestyle S11 |
| Silver | Miroslaw Piesak | Swimming | Men's 50m backstroke S2 |
| Silver | Katarzyna Pawlik | Swimming | Women's 100m freestyle S10 |
| Silver | Patrycja Harajda | Swimming | Women's 100m freestyle S12 |
| Silver | Katarzyna Pawlik | Swimming | Women's 100m butterfly S10 |
| Silver | Patrycja Harajda | Swimming | Women's 100m backstroke S12 |
| Silver | Patrycja Harajda | Swimming | Women's 200m individual medley SM12 |
| Silver | Adam Jurasz; Miroslaw Kowalski | Table tennis | Men's teams class 6–7 |
| Silver | Malgorzata Grzelak; Krystyna Jagodzinska; Natalia Partyka; Miroslawa Turowska | Table tennis | Women's teams class 6–10 |
| Silver | Radoslaw Stanczuk | Wheelchair fencing | Men's épée individual A |
| Silver | Robert Wysmierski | Wheelchair fencing | Men's épée individual B |
| Silver | Arkadiusz Jablonski; Dariusz Pender; Radoslaw Stanczuk; Robert Wysmierski | Wheelchair fencing | Men's épée team open |
| Silver | Piotr Czop | Wheelchair fencing | Men's foil individual B |
| Silver | Stefan Makowski | Wheelchair fencing | Men's sabre individual A |
| Silver | Piotr Czop; Arkadiusz Jablonski; Stefan Makowski; Robert Wysmierski | Wheelchair fencing | Men's sabre team open |
| Bronze | Malgorzata Olejnik | Archery | Women's individual standing |
| Bronze | Marcin Mielczarek | Athletics | Men's 400m T36 |
| Bronze | Mariusz Tubielewicz | Athletics | Men's 800m T37 |
| Bronze | Tomasz Hamerlak | Athletics | Men's marathon T54 |
| Bronze | Robert Chyra | Athletics | Men's shot put F37 |
| Bronze | Jacek Przebierala | Athletics | Men's javelin throw F37 |
| Bronze | Alicja Fiodorow | Athletics | Women's 400m T46 |
| Bronze | Renata Chilewska | Athletics | Women's discus throw F35/36/38 |
| Bronze | Ryszard Beczek | Swimming | Men's 200m freestyle S5 |
| Bronze | Piotr Pijanowski | Swimming | Men's 400m freestyle S10 |
| Bronze | Mateusz Michalski | Swimming | Men's 100m backstroke S6 |
| Bronze | Piotr Pijanowski | Swimming | Men's 200m individual medley SM10 |
| Bronze | Kamil Dragowski; Mateusz Michalski; Krzysztof Paterka; Piotr Pijanowski | Swimming | Men's 4 × 100 m medley relay 34pts |
| Bronze | Joanna Mendak | Swimming | Women's 100m freestyle S12 |
| Bronze | Dariusz Pender | Wheelchair fencing | Men's foil individual A |
| Bronze | Piotr Czop; Stefan Makowski; Dariusz Pender; Tomasz Walisiewicz | Wheelchair fencing | Men's foil team open |
| Bronze | Arkadiusz Jablonski | Wheelchair fencing | Men's sabre individual A |
| Bronze | Marta Wyrzykowska | Wheelchair fencing | Women's épée individual B |
| Bronze | Renata Frelik; Jadwiga Polasik; Dagmara Witos; Marta Wyrzykowska | Wheelchair fencing | Women's foil team open |

== Sports ==
=== Archery ===
==== Men ====
| Athlete | Event | Ranking round | | Round of 32 | Round of 16 | Quarterfinals | Semifinals | Finals | |
| Athlete | Event | Score | Seed | Opposition score | Opposition score | Opposition score | Opposition score | Opposition score | Rank |
|---|---|---|---|---|---|---|---|---|---|
| Ryszard Bukanski | Men's individual standing | 609 | 6 | Bye | Atamanenko (UKR); L 143–150 | did not advance | | | |
| Tomasz Lezanski | Men's individual standing | 611 | 4 | Bye | Wickramasinghe (SRI); W 149–147 | Zarzuela (ESP); W 95–89 | Zhu (CHN); W 97–88 | Lyocsa (SVK); L 103-103 * | 2nd place, silver medalist(s) |
| Ryszard Olejnik | Men's individual standing | 605 | 8 | Bye | Baatarjav (MGL); L 143–153 | did not advance | | | |
| Janusz Marian Bulyk | Men's individual W2 | 564 | 25 | Zhang (CHN); L 148–159 | did not advance | | | | |
| Piotr Sawicki | Men's individual W2 | 614 | 9 | Vitale (ITA); L 137–153 | did not advance | | | | |
| Ryszard Bukanski; Tomasz Lezanski; Piotr Sawicki | Men's team open | 1834 | 5 | N/A | Iran (IRI); W 221–210 | Great Britain (GBR); L 209–221 | did not advance | | |

- Tomasz Lezanski's gold medal match was won by additional medals. He lost 5–8 to Slovak paralympic archer Imrich Lyócsa who took the gold medal while Lezanski won the silver medal.

==== Women ====
| Athlete | Event | Ranking round | | Round of 32 | Round of 16 | Quarterfinals | Semifinals | Finals | |
| Athlete | Event | Score | Seed | Opposition score | Opposition score | Opposition score | Opposition score | Opposition score | Rank |
|---|---|---|---|---|---|---|---|---|---|
| Alicja Bukanska | Women's individual standing | 515 | 14 | N/A | Olejnik (POL); L 121–140 | did not advance | | | |
| Malgorzata Olejnik | Women's individual standing | 583 | 3 | N/A | Bukanska (POL); W 140–121 | Yonesawa (JPN); W 99–95 | Wang (CHN); L 80–98 | Panmai (THA); W 93–77 | 3rd place, bronze medalist(s) |
| Wieslawa Wolak | Women's individual standing | 527 | 10 | N/A | Tzika (GRE); L 128–130 | did not advance | | | |
| Alicja Bukanska; Malgorzata Olejnik; Wieslawa Wolak | Women's team open | 1625 | 5 | N/A | | Great Britain (GBR); L 168–210 | did not advance | | |

=== Athletics ===
==== Men's track ====
| Athlete | Class | Event | Heats | | Semifinal | | Final | |
| Athlete | Class | Event | Result | Rank | Result | Rank | Result | Rank |
|---|---|---|---|---|---|---|---|---|
| Tomasz Chmurzynski | T13 | 10000m | N/A | | | | 34:47.63 | 14 |
| Tomasz Chmurzynski | T13 | Marathon | N/A | | | | DNF | |
| Tomasz Hamerlak | T54 | 1500m | 3:00.81 | 5 Q | 3:05.27 | 7 q | 3:06.40 | 10 |
| Tomasz Hamerlak | T54 | 5000m | 10:29.93 | 11 Q | N/A | | 10:26.63 | 9 |
| Tomasz Hamerlak | T54 | 10000m | 21:09.02 | 4 Q | N/A | | 20:53.54 | 4 |
| Tomasz Hamerlak | T54 | Marathon | N/A | | | | 1:31:01 | 3rd place, bronze medalist(s) |
| Kordian Galinski | T13 | 100m | 11.26 | 5 Q | N/A | | 11.30 | 4 |
| Kordian Galinski | T13 | 200m | 23.59 | 10 | did not advance | | | |
| Lukasz Labuch | T37 | 100m | 12.30 | 4 Q | N/A | | 12.29 | 2nd place, silver medalist(s) |
| Lukasz Labuch | T37 | 200m | 25.76 | 6 q | N/A | | 25.45 | 6 |
| Marcin Mielczarek | T36 | 100m | 12.88 | 7 q | N/A | | 12.83 | 7 |
| Marcin Mielczarek | T36 | 200m | N/A | | | | 25.86 | 4 |
| Marcin Mielczarek | T36 | 400m | 1:00.00 | 4 Q | N/A | | 57.66 | 3rd place, bronze medalist(s) |
| Mariusz Sobczak | T36 | 100m | 13.65 | 9 | did not advance | | | |
| Mariusz Tubielewicz | T37 | 800m | 2:16.10 | 5 Q | N/A | | 2:10.17 | 3rd place, bronze medalist(s) |
| Mariusz Tubielewicz | T37 | 1500m | N/A | | | | 4:27.05 | 4 |
| Daniel Wozniak | T12 | 100m | 11.40 | 10 q | 15.80 | 11 | did not advance | |
| Daniel Wozniak | T12 | 200m | DNF | | did not advance | | | |
| Daniel Wozniak | T12 | 400m | 51.71 | 4 Q | 51.58 | 3 Q | 50.30 | 4 |

==== Men's field ====
| Athlete | Class | Event | Final | | |
| Athlete | Class | Event | Result | Points | Rank |
|---|---|---|---|---|---|
| Tomasz Blatkiewicz | F37 | Discus | 51.75 WR | - | 1st place, gold medalist(s) |
| Tomasz Blatkiewicz | F37 | Shot put | 14.83 WR | - | 1st place, gold medalist(s) |
| Robert Chyra | F37 | Discus | 46.25 | - | 4 |
| Robert Chyra | F37 | Shot put | 12.80 | - | 3rd place, bronze medalist(s) |
| Leszek Cmikiewicz | F42 | Discus | 30.81 | - | 10 |
| Leszek Cmikiewicz | F42 | High jump | 1.60 | - | 5 |
| Leszek Cmikiewicz | F42 | Javelin | 42.82 | - | 8 |
| Kordian Galinski | F13 | Long jump | 6.00 | - | 7 |
| Piotr Piotrowski | F36 | Discus | 32.94 | - | 4 |
| Piotr Piotrowski | F36 | Shot put | 12.12 | - | 1st place, gold medalist(s) |
| Piotr Piotrowski | F36/38 | Javelin | 37.14 | - | 2nd place, silver medalist(s) |
| Jacek Przebierala | F37 | Javelin | 44.78 | - | 3rd place, bronze medalist(s) |
| Miroslaw Pych | F12 | Javelin | 52.32 | - | 2nd place, silver medalist(s) |
| Miroslaw Pych | P13 | Pentathlon | DNF | | |
| Janusz Rokicki | F58 | Discus | 39.55 | - | 10 |
| Piotr Sikorski | F35 | Discus | 32.39 | - | 7 |
| Piotr Sikorski | F35 | Shot put | 10.84 | - | 7 |
| Krzysztof Smorszczewski | F55-56 | Javelin | 28.73 | 897 | 10 |
| Krzysztof Smorszczewski | F56 | Shot put | 11.70 PR | - | 1st place, gold medalist(s) |
| Mariusz Sobczak | F36-38 | Long jump | 4.96 | 979 | 5 |
| Maciej Sochal | F33-34 | Shot put | 5.69 | 593 | 11 |
| Marcin Wesolowski | F12 | Long jump | 6.44 | - | 11 |
| Marcin Wesolowski | P13 | Pentathlon | DNF | | |

==== Women's track ====
| Athlete | Class | Event | Heats | | Semifinal | | Final | |
| Athlete | Class | Event | Result | Rank | Result | Rank | Result | Rank |
|---|---|---|---|---|---|---|---|---|
| Alicja Fiodorow | T46 | 100m | 12.77 | 2 Q | N/A | | 12.89 | 4 |
| Alicja Fiodorow | T46 | 200m | 26.50 | 4 Q | N/A | | 25.99 | 4 |
| Alicja Fiodorow | T46 | 400m | 1:02.49 | 3 Q | N/A | | 58.23 | 3rd place, bronze medalist(s) |
| Katarzyna Kwiatkowska | T12 | 200m | 28.14 | 5 q | 28.63 | 8 B | 28.64 | 4 |
| Katarzyna Kwiatkowska | T12 | 400m | 1:04.40 | 8 q | 1:03.68 | 8 B | 1:04.21 | 2 |
| Anna Szymul | T46 | 100m | 12.79 | 3 Q | N/A | | 12.64 | 2nd place, silver medalist(s) |
| Anna Szymul | T46 | 200m | 25.69 WR | 1 Q | N/A | | 25.68 | 2nd place, silver medalist(s) |
| Anna Szymul | T46 | 400m | 1:00.98 | 2 Q | N/A | | 57.45 | 2nd place, silver medalist(s) |

==== Women's field ====
| Athlete | Class | Event | Final | | |
| Athlete | Class | Event | Result | Points | Rank |
|---|---|---|---|---|---|
| Renata Chilewska | F35/36 | Shot put | 9.09 | 1308 | 2nd place, silver medalist(s) |
| Renata Chilewska | F35/36/38 | Discus | 21.82 | 1230 | 3rd place, bronze medalist(s) |
| Renata Chilewska | F35-38 | Javelin | 23.24 PR | 1318 | 1st place, gold medalist(s) |
| Ewa Zielinska | F42 | Long jump | 3.38 | - | 4 |
| Bozena Zych | F42-46 | Shot put | 8.03 | 1072 | 4 |

=== Cycling ===
==== Men's road ====
| Athlete | Event | Time | Rank |
|---|---|---|---|
| Robert Plotkowiak; Krzysztof Kosikowski (pilot) | Men's road race/time trial B1-3 | 3:09:12 | 12 |

==== Men's track ====
| Athlete | Event | Qualification | | 1st round | | Final | |
| Athlete | Event | Time | Rank | Time | Rank | Opposition Time | Rank |
|---|---|---|---|---|---|---|---|
| Krzysztof Kosikowski (pilot); Lukasz Tunkiewicz | Men's 1km time trial tandem B1-3 | N/A | | | | 1:10.99 | 17 |
| Krzysztof Kosikowski (pilot); Lukasz Tunkiewicz | Men's sprint tandem B1-3 | 11.484 | 10 | did not advance | | | |

=== Equestrian ===
| Athlete | Event | Total | |
| Athlete | Event | Score | Rank |
|---|---|---|---|
| Aneta Matysiak | Mixed individual championship test grade II | 54.636 | 18 |
| Aneta Matysiak | Mixed individual freestyle test grade II | 64.056 | 17 |

=== Powerlifting ===
==== Men ====
| Athlete | Event | Result | Rank |
|---|---|---|---|
| Ryszard Fornalczyk | 75kg | 192.5 | 4 |
| Leszek Hallmann | +100kg | 200.0 | 6 |
| Andrzej Gren | 52kg | 145.0 | 5 |
| Edmund Klimek | 48kg | 142.5 | 5 |
| Damian Kulig | 82.5kg | 190.0 | 8 |
| Krzysztof Owsiany | 56kg | 155.0 | 5 |
| Ryszard Rogala | 90kg | 220.0 | 2nd place, silver medalist(s) |
| Mariusz Tomczyk | 60kg | 160.0 | 7 |

==== Women ====
| Athlete | Event | Result | Rank |
|---|---|---|---|
| Anna Marczuk | 44kg | 62.5 | 7 |
| Maria Suska | 82.5kg | NMR | |

=== Shooting ===
==== Men ====
| Athlete | Event | Qualification | | Final | | |
| Athlete | Event | Score | Rank | Score | Total | Rank |
|---|---|---|---|---|---|---|
| Waldemar Andruszkiewicz | Men's 10m air rifle standing SH1 | 556 | 21 | did not advance | | |
| Waldemar Andruszkiewicz | Men's 50m rifle 3 positions SH1 | 1066 | 22 | did not advance | | |
| Waldemar Andruszkiewicz | Mixed 10m air rifle prone SH1 | 597 | 14 | did not advance | | |
| Waldemar Andruszkiewicz | Mixed 50m rifle prone SH1 | 580 | 18 | did not advance | | |
| Slawonir Okoniewski | Men's 10m air pistol SH1 | 550 | 23 | did not advance | | |
| Andrzej Saluda | Mixed 10m air rifle prone SH1 | 597 | 14 | did not advance | | |
| Andrzej Saluda | Mixed 50m rifle prone SH1 | 566 | 34 | did not advance | | |

==== Women ====
| Athlete | Event | Qualification | | Final | | |
| Athlete | Event | Score | Rank | Score | Total | Rank |
|---|---|---|---|---|---|---|
| Jolanta Szulc | Mixed 10m air rifle prone SH1 | 593 | 38 | did not advance | | |
| Jolanta Szulc | Mixed 50m rifle prone SH1 | 575 | 24 | did not advance | | |
| Jolanta Szulc | Women's 10m air rifle standing SH1 | 365 | 17 | did not advance | | |
| Jolanta Szulc | Women's 50m rifle 3 positions SH1 | 528 | 9 | did not advance | | |

=== Swimming ===
==== Men ====
| Athlete | Class | Event | Heats | | Final | |
| Athlete | Class | Event | Result | Rank | Result | Rank |
|---|---|---|---|---|---|---|
| Ryszard Beczek | S5 | 50m freestyle | 39.13 | 6 Q | 36.65 | 5 |
| Ryszard Beczek | S5 | 100m freestyle | 1:24.77 | 5 Q | 1:19.12 | 4 |
| Ryszard Beczek | S5 | 200m freestyle | 2:52.47 | 2 Q | 2:49.37 | 3rd place, bronze medalist(s) |
| Ryszard Beczek | S5 | 50m butterfly | DSQ | | did not advance | |
| Kamil Dragowski | S10 | 100m butterfly | 1:05.28 | 10 | did not advance | |
| Mateusz Michalski | S6 | 100m backstroke | 1:19.40 | 2 Q | 1:18.52 | 3rd place, bronze medalist(s) |
| Mateusz Michalski | S6 | 50m butterfly | 37.20 | 10 | did not advance | |
| Mateusz Michalski | SB5 | 100m breaststroke | 1:55.33 | 11 | did not advance | |
| Mateusz Michalski | SM6 | 200m individual medley | 3:08.89 | 8 Q | 3:09.82 | 7 |
| Robert Musiorski | S12 | 100m freestyle | 59.13 | 9 | did not advance | |
| Robert Musiorski | S12 | 400m freestyle | 5:03.88 | 11 | did not advance | |
| Robert Musiorski | SB12 | 100m breaststroke | 1:14.23 | 3 Q | 1:14.08 | 5 |
| Robert Musiorski | SM12 | 200m individual medley | 2:31.31 | 8 Q | 2:29.45 | 8 |
| Krzyzstof Paterka | SB8 | 100m breaststroke | 1:12.30 PR | 2 Q | DSQ | |
| Miroslaw Piesak | S2 | 50m freestyle | 1:11.46 | 4 Q | 1:10.52 | 4 |
| Miroslaw Piesak | S2 | 100m freestyle | 2:48.05 | 7 Q | 2:40.65 | 5 |
| Miroslaw Piesak | S2 | 50m backstroke | 1:12.78 | 3 Q | 1:09.42 | 2nd place, silver medalist(s) |
| Damian Pietrasik | S11 | 100m backstroke | 1:17.08 | 5 Q | 1:16.15 | 5 |
| Damian Pietrasik | SB11 | 100m breaststroke | 1:30.01 | 8 Q | DSQ | |
| Piotr Pijanowski | S10 | 100m freestyle | 57.86 | 8 Q | 57.32 | 8 |
| Piotr Pijanowski | S10 | 400m freestyle | 4:29.55 | 6 Q | 4:22.12 | 3rd place, bronze medalist(s) |
| Piotr Pijanowski | S10 | 100m backstroke | 1:12.42 | 15 | did not advance | |
| Piotr Pijanowski | S10 | 100m butterfly | 1:02.90 | 6 Q | 1:01.68 | 6 |
| Piotr Pijanowski | SM10 | 200m individual medley | 2:24.88 | 2 Q | 2:22.62 | 3rd place, bronze medalist(s) |
| Grzegorz Polkowski | S11 | 50m freestyle | 27.95 | 3 Q | 26.98 | 2nd place, silver medalist(s) |
| Grzegorz Polkowski | S11 | 100m freestyle | 1:02.41 | 2 Q | 1:00.99 | 4 |
| Grzegorz Polkowski | S11 | 400m freestyle | 5:20.44 | 6 Q | 5:08.17 | 5 |
| Grzegorz Polkowski | S11 | 100m backstroke | 1:18.11 | 7 Q | 1:19.24 | 8 |
| Krzyzstof Sleczka | S5 | 100m freestyle | 1:31.20 | 9 | did not advance | |
| Krzyzstof Sleczka | S5 | 200m freestyle | 3:10.35 | 5 Q | 3:08.59 | 5 |
| Krzyzstof Sleczka | S5 | 50m backstroke | 43.05 | 4 Q | 42.78 | 5 |
| Krzyzstof Sleczka | SM4 | 150m individual medley | 2:46.27 | 3 Q | 2:47.01 | 4 |
| Maciej Sucharski | S6 | 400m freestyle | 5:46.38 | 9 | did not advance | |
| Maciej Sucharski | SM6 | 200m individual medley | 3:19.21 | 11 | did not advance | |
| Andrzej Ziembowski | S3 | 50m freestyle | 58.16 | 8 Q | 58.60 | 8 |
| Andrzej Ziembowski | S3 | 100m freestyle | 2:04.68 | 5 Q | 2:02.14 | 8 |
| Andrzej Ziembowski | S3 | 200m freestyle | 4:34.75 | 8 Q | 4:35.27 | 8 |
| Kamil Dragowski; Mateusz Michalski; Krzysztof Paterka; Piotr Pijanowski | N/A | 4 × 100 m medley relay (34pts) | 4:35.81 | 1 Q | 4:30.80 | 3rd place, bronze medalist(s) |

==== Women ====
| Athlete | Class | Event | Heats | | Final | |
| Athlete | Class | Event | Result | Rank | Result | Rank |
|---|---|---|---|---|---|---|
| Katarzyna Brzostowska | S10 | 50m freestyle | 33.42 | 15 | did not advance | |
| Katarzyna Brzostowska | S10 | 100m freestyle | 1:11.53 | 11 | did not advance | |
| Katarzyna Brzostowska | S10 | 400m freestyle | 5:17.32 | 8 Q | 5:21.01 | 8 |
| Katarzyna Brzostowska | S10 | 100m backstroke | N/A | | 1:20.88 | 6 |
| Katarzyna Brzostowska | SM10 | 200m individual medley | 2:58.79 | 10 | did not advance | |
| Beata Drozdowska | S9 | 50m freestyle | 31.85 | 6 Q | 31.82 | 7 |
| Beata Drozdowska | S9 | 100m freestyle | 1:08.54 | 4 Q | 1:08.77 | 6 |
| Beata Drozdowska | S9 | 400m freestyle | 5:28.34 | 10 | did not advance | |
| Beata Drozdowska | S9 | 100m backstroke | 1:17.48 | 4 Q | 1:17.07 | 4 |
| Karolina Hamer | S4 | 50m backstroke | 1:06.68 | 7 Q | 1:06.09 | 7 |
| Karolina Hamer | S4 | 50m butterfly | N/A | | 1:19.82 | 6 |
| Karolina Hamer | SB4 | 100m breaststroke | 2:25.72 | 10 | did not advance | |
| Karolina Hamer | SM4 | 150m individual medley | 3:28.62 | 5 Q | 3:29.58 | 4 |
| Patrycja Harajda | S12 | 50m freestyle | 30.01 | 5 Q | 30.07 | 6 |
| Patrycja Harajda | S12 | 100m freestyle | 1:03.88 | 1 Q | 1:03.52 | 2nd place, silver medalist(s) |
| Patrycja Harajda | S12 | 400m freestyle | N/A | | 5:08.29 | 4 |
| Patrycja Harajda | S12 | 100m backstroke | N/A | | 1:14.18 | 2nd place, silver medalist(s) |
| Patrycja Harajda | SM12 | 200m individual medley | 2:42.58 | 3 Q | 2:40.76 | 2nd place, silver medalist(s) |
| Magdalena Jaroslawska | S8 | 50m freestyle | 36.76 | 13 | did not advance | |
| Magdalena Jaroslawska | S8 | 100m freestyle | 1:21.81 | 13 | did not advance | |
| Magdalena Jaroslawska | S8 | 400m freestyle | 5:52.48 | 10 | did not advance | |
| Magdalena Jaroslawska | S8 | 100m butterfly | 1:44.01 | 12 | did not advance | |
| Magdalena Jaroslawska | SB7 | 100m breaststroke | 1:54.14 | 8 Q | 1:53.09 | 7 |
| Marlena Lewandowska | S7 | 50m freestyle | 38.67 | 12 | did not advance | |
| Marlena Lewandowska | S7 | 100m freestyle | 1:23.55 | 10 | did not advance | |
| Marlena Lewandowska | S7 | 100m backstroke | 1:36.42 | 7 Q | 1:34.53 | 4 |
| Marlena Lewandowska | S7 | 50m butterfly | 38.88 | 3 Q | 38.33 | 4 |
| Joanna Mendak | S12 | 50m freestyle | 30.74 | 6 Q | 29.55 | 4 |
| Joanna Mendak | S12 | 100m freestyle | 1:04.72 | 3 Q | 1:04.33 | 3rd place, bronze medalist(s) |
| Joanna Mendak | S12 | 100m backstroke | N/A | | 1:18.40 | 5 |
| Joanna Mendak | S12 | 100m butterfly | 1:07.17 | 2 Q | 1:04.87 WR | 1st place, gold medalist(s) |
| Joanna Mendak | SB12 | 100m breaststroke | 1:25.77 | 3 Q | 1:26.24 | 5 |
| Joanna Mendak | SM12 | 200m individual medley | 2:46.85 | 5 Q | 2:41.15 | 4 |
| Aneta Michalska | S8 | 50m freestyle | 35.49 | 9 | did not advance | |
| Aneta Michalska | S8 | 100m freestyle | 1:18.20 | 9 | did not advance | |
| Aneta Michalska | S8 | 400m freestyle | 5:46.98 | 8 Q | 5:33.20 | 5 |
| Aneta Michalska | S8 | 100m backstroke | 1:33.83 | 9 | did not advance | |
| Aneta Michalska | S8 | 100m butterfly | 1:33.52 | 9 | did not advance | |
| Katarzyna Mielczarek | S2 | 50m freestyle | N/A | | 2:07.33 | 7 |
| Katarzyna Mielczarek | S2 | 50m backstroke | N/A | | 2:23.01 | 7 |
| Katarzyna Pawlik | S10 | 50m freestyle | 32.79 | 13 | did not advance | |
| Katarzyna Pawlik | S10 | 100m freestyle | 1:05.35 | 2 Q | 1:04.46 | 2nd place, silver medalist(s) |
| Katarzyna Pawlik | S10 | 400m freestyle | 5:00.25 | 2 Q | 4:51.08 | 1st place, gold medalist(s) |
| Katarzyna Pawlik | S10 | 100m backstroke | N/A | | 1:22.20 | 8 |
| Katarzyna Pawlik | S10 | 100m butterfly | 1:12.64 | 1 Q | 1:13.06 | 2nd place, silver medalist(s) |
| Katarzyna Pawlik | SM10 | 200m individual medley | 2:47.41 | 2 Q | 2:46.78 | 5 |
| Magdalena Szczepinska | S10 | 50m freestyle | 31.08 | 5 Q | 30.98 | 6 |
| Magdalena Szczepinska | S10 | 100m freestyle | 1:08.79 | 9 | did not advance | |
| Magdalena Szczepinska | S10 | 100m butterfly | 1:13.69 | 2 Q | 1:12.30 | 1st place, gold medalist(s) |
| Beata Drozdowska; Marlena Lewandowska; Aneta Michalska; Katarzyna Pawlik | N/A | 4 × 100 m freestyle relay | N/A | | 4:49.99 | 5 |
| Beata Drozdowska; Magdalena Jaroslawska; Aneta Michalska; Magdalena Szczepinksa | N/A | 4 × 100 m medley relay | N/A | | DSQ | |

=== Table tennis ===
==== Men ====
| Athlete | Event | Preliminaries | | | | Quarterfinals | Semifinals | Final / BM | |
| Athlete | Event | Opposition Result | Opposition Result | Opposition Result | Rank | Opposition Result | Opposition Result | Opposition Result | Rank |
|---|---|---|---|---|---|---|---|---|---|
| Adam Jurasz | Men's singles 7 | Messi (FRA); L 0–3 | Meyer (GER); L 0–3 | Bidnyy (UKR); W 3–0 | 3 | did not advance | | | |
| Miroslaw Kowalski | Men's singles 6 | Blok (NED); W 3–0 | Kusiak (GER); L 1–3 | Abbadie (FRA); W 3–0 | 1 Q | Jensen (DEN); W 3–1 | Arnold (GER); L 0–3 | Rosenmeier (DEN); L 0–3 | 4 |
| Rafal Lis | Men's singles 4 | Ghion (BEL); L 0–3 | Martin (FRA); L 2–3 | Park (KOR); W 3–1 | 3 | did not advance | | | |
| Marcin Skrzynecki | Men's singles 8 | Glikman (ISR); L 0–3 | Schaller (FRA); L 2–3 | Mitas (SVK); W 3–2 | 3 | did not advance | | | |

==== Women ====
| Athlete | Event | Preliminaries | | | | Quarterfinals | Semifinals | Final / BM | |
| Athlete | Event | Opposition Result | Opposition Result | Opposition Result | Rank | Opposition Result | Opposition Result | Opposition Result | Rank |
|---|---|---|---|---|---|---|---|---|---|
| Krystyna Jagodzinska | Women's singles 10 | Matouskova (CZE); L 0–3 | Li (CHN); L 2–3 | Sevin (FRA); W 3–0 | 3 | did not advance | | | |
| Teresa Glinksa | Women's singles 6-8 | Zhang (CHN); L 0–3 | Barbusova (SVK); L 2–3 | N/A | 3 | did not advance | | | |
| Malgorzata Grzelak | Women's singles 9 | Liu (CHN); L 0–3 | Kamkasomphou (FRA); L 0–3 | Muylaert (BEL); W 3–0 | 3 | did not advance | | | |
| Natalia Partyka | Women's singles 10 | Kudo (JPN); W 3–0 | Zakova (CZE); W 3–0 | le Morvan (FRA); W 3–0 | 1 Q | N/A | Li (CHN); W 3–0 | Matouskova (CZE); W 3–0 | 1st place, gold medalist(s) |
| Miroslawa Turowska | Women's singles 6-8 | Janeckova (SVK); W 3–1 | Tchebanika (RUS); W 3–0 | N/A | 1 Q | Bye | Bengtsson Kovacs (SWE); L 2–3 | Ovsjannikova (RUS); L 1–3 | 4 |

==== Teams ====
| Athlete | Event | Preliminaries | | | | Semifinals | Final / BM | |
| Athlete | Event | Opposition Result | Opposition Result | Opposition Result | Rank | Opposition Result | Opposition Result | Rank |
|---|---|---|---|---|---|---|---|---|
| Adam Jurasz; Miroslaw Kowalski | Men's teams 6-7 | Germany (GER); L 0–3 | Ukraine (UKR); W 3–1 | N/A | 2 Q | France (FRA); W 3–2 | Germany (GER); L 1–3 | 2nd place, silver medalist(s) |
| Malgorzata Grzelak; Krystyna Jagozinska; Natalia Partyka; Miroslawa Turowska | Women's team 6-10 | Czech Republic (CZE); W 3–1 | Russia (RUS); W 3–0 | France (FRA); W 3–1 | N/A | | China (CHN); L 2–3 | 2nd place, silver medalist(s) |

=== Wheelchair fencing ===
==== Men ====
| Athlete | Event | Qualification | | | Round of 16 | Quarterfinal | Semifinal | Final / BM | |
| Athlete | Event | Opposition | Score | Rank | Opposition Score | Opposition Score | Opposition Score | Opposition Score | Rank |
|---|---|---|---|---|---|---|---|---|---|
| Piotr Czop | Men's foil B | Latreche (FRA) | W 5–2 | 1 Q | Wong (HKG); W 15–9 | Shenkevych (UKR); W 15–6 | Komar (UKR); W 15–10 | Hui (HKG); L 11–15 | 2nd place, silver medalist(s) |
| Piotr Czop | Men's foil B | Moreno (USA) | W 5–1 | 1 Q | Wong (HKG); W 15–9 | Shenkevych (UKR); W 15–6 | Komar (UKR); W 15–10 | Hui (HKG); L 11–15 | 2nd place, silver medalist(s) |
| Piotr Czop | Men's foil B | Sarri (ITA) | W 5–2 | 1 Q | Wong (HKG); W 15–9 | Shenkevych (UKR); W 15–6 | Komar (UKR); W 15–10 | Hui (HKG); L 11–15 | 2nd place, silver medalist(s) |
| Piotr Czop | Men's foil B | Bogdos (GRE) | W 5–0 | 1 Q | Wong (HKG); W 15–9 | Shenkevych (UKR); W 15–6 | Komar (UKR); W 15–10 | Hui (HKG); L 11–15 | 2nd place, silver medalist(s) |
| Piotr Czop | Men's sabre B | Mari (ITA) | L 2–5 | 1 Q | Bye | Hui (HKG); L 8–15 | did not advance | | |
| Piotr Czop | Men's sabre B | Hui (HKG) | W 5–2 | 1 Q | Bye | Hui (HKG); L 8–15 | did not advance | | |
| Piotr Czop | Men's sabre B | Park (KOR) | W 5–1 | 1 Q | Bye | Hui (HKG); L 8–15 | did not advance | | |
| Piotr Czop | Men's sabre B | Arnau (ESP) | W 5–1 | 1 Q | Bye | Hui (HKG); L 8–15 | did not advance | | |
| Piotr Czop | Men's sabre B | Moreno (USA) | W 5–2 | 1 Q | Bye | Hui (HKG); L 8–15 | did not advance | | |
| Arkadiusz Jablonski | Men's épée A | Al Qallaf (KUW) | L 2–5 | 3 Q | Almansouri (KUW); W 15–10 | Ahner (GER); W 15–13 | Stanczuk (POL); L 9–15 | Kwong (HKG); L 10–15 | 4 |
| Arkadiusz Jablonski | Men's épée A | Lipinski (GER) | W 5–4 | 3 Q | Almansouri (KUW); W 15–10 | Ahner (GER); W 15–13 | Stanczuk (POL); L 9–15 | Kwong (HKG); L 10–15 | 4 |
| Arkadiusz Jablonski | Men's épée A | Tai (HKG) | W 5–4 | 3 Q | Almansouri (KUW); W 15–10 | Ahner (GER); W 15–13 | Stanczuk (POL); L 9–15 | Kwong (HKG); L 10–15 | 4 |
| Arkadiusz Jablonski | Men's épée A | More (FRA) | W 5–4 | 3 Q | Almansouri (KUW); W 15–10 | Ahner (GER); W 15–13 | Stanczuk (POL); L 9–15 | Kwong (HKG); L 10–15 | 4 |
| Arkadiusz Jablonski | Men's épée A | Peppas (GRE) | W 5–2 | 3 Q | Almansouri (KUW); W 15–10 | Ahner (GER); W 15–13 | Stanczuk (POL); L 9–15 | Kwong (HKG); L 10–15 | 4 |
| Arkadiusz Jablonski | Men's épée A | Rodríguez (ESP) | W 5–4 | 3 Q | Almansouri (KUW); W 15–10 | Ahner (GER); W 15–13 | Stanczuk (POL); L 9–15 | Kwong (HKG); L 10–15 | 4 |
| Arkadiusz Jablonski | Men's sabre A | Tai (HKG) | W 5–2 | 1 Q | Doeme (HUN); W 15–2 | Fung (HKG); W 15–13 | Pellegrini (ITA); L 12–15 | El Assine (FRA); W 15–7 | 3rd place, bronze medalist(s) |
| Arkadiusz Jablonski | Men's sabre A | More (FRA) | W 5–4 | 1 Q | Doeme (HUN); W 15–2 | Fung (HKG); W 15–13 | Pellegrini (ITA); L 12–15 | El Assine (FRA); W 15–7 | 3rd place, bronze medalist(s) |
| Arkadiusz Jablonski | Men's sabre A | Serafini (ITA) | W 5–1 | 1 Q | Doeme (HUN); W 15–2 | Fung (HKG); W 15–13 | Pellegrini (ITA); L 12–15 | El Assine (FRA); W 15–7 | 3rd place, bronze medalist(s) |
| Arkadiusz Jablonski | Men's sabre A | Ahner (GER) | W 5–4 | 1 Q | Doeme (HUN); W 15–2 | Fung (HKG); W 15–13 | Pellegrini (ITA); L 12–15 | El Assine (FRA); W 15–7 | 3rd place, bronze medalist(s) |
| Arkadiusz Jablonski | Men's sabre A | Dulah (MAS) | W 5–1 | 1 Q | Doeme (HUN); W 15–2 | Fung (HKG); W 15–13 | Pellegrini (ITA); L 12–15 | El Assine (FRA); W 15–7 | 3rd place, bronze medalist(s) |
| Grzegorz Lewonowski | Men's épée B | Mayer (GER) | L 3–5 | 2 Q | Wysmierski (POL); L 8–15 | did not advance | | | |
| Grzegorz Lewonowski | Men's épée B | Wong (HKG) | L 4–5 | 2 Q | Wysmierski (POL); L 8–15 | did not advance | | | |
| Grzegorz Lewonowski | Men's épée B | Latreche (FRA) | W 5–2 | 2 Q | Wysmierski (POL); L 8–15 | did not advance | | | |
| Grzegorz Lewonowski | Men's épée B | Alsaedi (KUW) | W 5–4 | 2 Q | Wysmierski (POL); L 8–15 | did not advance | | | |
| Grzegorz Lewonowski | Men's épée B | Shumate (USA) | W 5–1 | 2 Q | Wysmierski (POL); L 8–15 | did not advance | | | |
| Grzegorz Lewonowski | Men's foil B | Hui (HKG) | L 2–5 | 4 | did not advance | | | | |
| Grzegorz Lewonowski | Men's foil B | Rodgers (USA) | L 1–5 | 4 | did not advance | | | | |
| Grzegorz Lewonowski | Men's foil B | Shenkevych (UKR) | L 1–5 | 4 | did not advance | | | | |
| Grzegorz Lewonowski | Men's foil B | Hisakawa (JPN) | W 5–1 | 4 | did not advance | | | | |
| Stefan Makowski | Men's foil A | Zhang (CHN) | L 0–5 | 2 Q | Maillard (FRA); L 13–15 | did not advance | | | |
| Stefan Makowski | Men's foil A | Chan (HKG) | W 5–4 | 2 Q | Maillard (FRA); L 13–15 | did not advance | | | |
| Stefan Makowski | Men's foil A | van der Wege (USA) | W 5–1 | 2 Q | Maillard (FRA); L 13–15 | did not advance | | | |
| Stefan Makowski | Men's foil A | Fernandez (ESP) | W 5–0 | 2 Q | Maillard (FRA); L 13–15 | did not advance | | | |
| Stefan Makowski | Men's foil A | Khder (IRQ) | W 5–1 | 2 Q | Maillard (FRA); L 13–15 | did not advance | | | |
| Stefan Makowski | Men's sabre A | El Assine (FRA) | W 5–3 | 1 Q | Bye | Chan (HKG); W 15–9 | El Assine (FRA); W 15–7 | Pellegrini (ITA); L 12–15 | 2nd place, silver medalist(s) |
| Stefan Makowski | Men's sabre A | Chan (HKG) | W 5–2 | 1 Q | Bye | Chan (HKG); W 15–9 | El Assine (FRA); W 15–7 | Pellegrini (ITA); L 12–15 | 2nd place, silver medalist(s) |
| Stefan Makowski | Men's sabre A | Fernandez (ESP) | W 5–4 | 1 Q | Bye | Chan (HKG); W 15–9 | El Assine (FRA); W 15–7 | Pellegrini (ITA); L 12–15 | 2nd place, silver medalist(s) |
| Stefan Makowski | Men's sabre A | Doeme (HUN) | W 5–0 | 1 Q | Bye | Chan (HKG); W 15–9 | El Assine (FRA); W 15–7 | Pellegrini (ITA); L 12–15 | 2nd place, silver medalist(s) |
| Stefan Makowski | Men's sabre A | Khder (IRQ) | W 5–1 | 1 Q | Bye | Chan (HKG); W 15–9 | El Assine (FRA); W 15–7 | Pellegrini (ITA); L 12–15 | 2nd place, silver medalist(s) |
| Dariusz Pender | Men's épée A | Maillard (FRA) | L 0–5 | 2 Q | Tai (HKG); W 15–7 | More (FRA); L 12–15 | did not advance | | |
| Dariusz Pender | Men's épée A | Doeme (HUN) | W 5–3 | 2 Q | Tai (HKG); W 15–7 | More (FRA); L 12–15 | did not advance | | |
| Dariusz Pender | Men's épée A | Zhang (CHN) | W 5–4 | 2 Q | Tai (HKG); W 15–7 | More (FRA); L 12–15 | did not advance | | |
| Dariusz Pender | Men's épée A | Kwong (HKG) | W 5–2 | 2 Q | Tai (HKG); W 15–7 | More (FRA); L 12–15 | did not advance | | |
| Dariusz Pender | Men's épée A | van der Wege (USA) | W 5–0 | 2 Q | Tai (HKG); W 15–7 | More (FRA); L 12–15 | did not advance | | |
| Dariusz Pender | Men's foil A | Kwong (HKG) | W 5–0 | 1 Q | Almansouri (KUW); W 15–7 | Chan (HKG); W 15–8 | Fung (HKG); L 9–15 | Al Qallaf (KUW); W 15–12 | 3rd place, bronze medalist(s) |
| Dariusz Pender | Men's foil A | Citerne (FRA) | W 5–0 | 1 Q | Almansouri (KUW); W 15–7 | Chan (HKG); W 15–8 | Fung (HKG); L 9–15 | Al Qallaf (KUW); W 15–12 | 3rd place, bronze medalist(s) |
| Dariusz Pender | Men's foil A | Peppas (GRE) | W 5–2 | 1 Q | Almansouri (KUW); W 15–7 | Chan (HKG); W 15–8 | Fung (HKG); L 9–15 | Al Qallaf (KUW); W 15–12 | 3rd place, bronze medalist(s) |
| Dariusz Pender | Men's foil A | Rodriguez (USA) | W 5–0 | 1 Q | Almansouri (KUW); W 15–7 | Chan (HKG); W 15–8 | Fung (HKG); L 9–15 | Al Qallaf (KUW); W 15–12 | 3rd place, bronze medalist(s) |
| Radoslaw Stanczuk | Men's épée A | Zhang (CHN) | W 5–3 | 1 Q | Bye | Citerne (FRA); W 15–13 | Jablonski (POL); W 15–9 | More (FRA); L 11–15 | 2nd place, silver medalist(s) |
| Radoslaw Stanczuk | Men's épée A | Citerne (FRA) | W 5–3 | 1 Q | Bye | Citerne (FRA); W 15–13 | Jablonski (POL); W 15–9 | More (FRA); L 11–15 | 2nd place, silver medalist(s) |
| Radoslaw Stanczuk | Men's épée A | Ahner (GER) | W 5–1 | 1 Q | Bye | Citerne (FRA); W 15–13 | Jablonski (POL); W 15–9 | More (FRA); L 11–15 | 2nd place, silver medalist(s) |
| Radoslaw Stanczuk | Men's épée A | Almansouri (KUW) | W 5–0 | 1 Q | Bye | Citerne (FRA); W 15–13 | Jablonski (POL); W 15–9 | More (FRA); L 11–15 | 2nd place, silver medalist(s) |
| Radoslaw Stanczuk | Men's épée A | Sanchez (ESP) | W 5–2 | 1 Q | Bye | Citerne (FRA); W 15–13 | Jablonski (POL); W 15–9 | More (FRA); L 11–15 | 2nd place, silver medalist(s) |
| Tomasz Walisiewicz | Men's foil A | Fung (HKG) | L 1–5 | 3 Q | Chan (HKG); L 13–15 | did not advance | | | |
| Tomasz Walisiewicz | Men's foil A | Al Qallaf (KUW) | L 4–5 | 3 Q | Chan (HKG); L 13–15 | did not advance | | | |
| Tomasz Walisiewicz | Men's foil A | El Assine (FRA) | W 5–3 | 3 Q | Chan (HKG); L 13–15 | did not advance | | | |
| Tomasz Walisiewicz | Men's foil A | Serafini (ITA) | W 5–3 | 3 Q | Chan (HKG); L 13–15 | did not advance | | | |
| Tomasz Walisiewicz | Men's foil A | Dulah (MAS) | W 5–2 | 3 Q | Chan (HKG); L 13–15 | did not advance | | | |
| Robert Wysmierski | Men's épée B | Hu (CHN) | L 3–5 | 4 Q | Lewonowski (POL); W 15–8 | Mayer (GER); W 15–9 | Rodgers (USA); W 15–5 | Komar (UKR); L 9–15 | 2nd place, silver medalist(s) |
| Robert Wysmierski | Men's épée B | Shenkevych (UKR) | L 3–5 | 4 Q | Lewonowski (POL); W 15–8 | Mayer (GER); W 15–9 | Rodgers (USA); W 15–5 | Komar (UKR); L 9–15 | 2nd place, silver medalist(s) |
| Robert Wysmierski | Men's épée B | Rodgers (USA) | L 3–5 | 4 Q | Lewonowski (POL); W 15–8 | Mayer (GER); W 15–9 | Rodgers (USA); W 15–5 | Komar (UKR); L 9–15 | 2nd place, silver medalist(s) |
| Robert Wysmierski | Men's épée B | François (FRA) | W 5–2 | 4 Q | Lewonowski (POL); W 15–8 | Mayer (GER); W 15–9 | Rodgers (USA); W 15–5 | Komar (UKR); L 9–15 | 2nd place, silver medalist(s) |
| Robert Wysmierski | Men's épée B | Heaton (GBR) | W 5–2 | 4 Q | Lewonowski (POL); W 15–8 | Mayer (GER); W 15–9 | Rodgers (USA); W 15–5 | Komar (UKR); L 9–15 | 2nd place, silver medalist(s) |
| Robert Wysmierski | Men's sabre B | Durand (FRA) | W 5–2 | 1 Q | Bye | Heaton (GBR); W 15–4 | Durand (FRA); W 15–5 | Hui (HKG); W 15–4 | 1st place, gold medalist(s) |
| Robert Wysmierski | Men's sabre B | Mayer (GER) | W 5–2 | 1 Q | Bye | Heaton (GBR); W 15–4 | Durand (FRA); W 15–5 | Hui (HKG); W 15–4 | 1st place, gold medalist(s) |
| Robert Wysmierski | Men's sabre B | Szekeres (HUN) | W 5–1 | 1 Q | Bye | Heaton (GBR); W 15–4 | Durand (FRA); W 15–5 | Hui (HKG); W 15–4 | 1st place, gold medalist(s) |
| Robert Wysmierski | Men's sabre B | Heaton (GBR) | W 5–1 | 1 Q | Bye | Heaton (GBR); W 15–4 | Durand (FRA); W 15–5 | Hui (HKG); W 15–4 | 1st place, gold medalist(s) |
| Robert Wysmierski | Men's sabre B | Bogdos (GRE) | W 5–2 | 1 Q | Bye | Heaton (GBR); W 15–4 | Durand (FRA); W 15–5 | Hui (HKG); W 15–4 | 1st place, gold medalist(s) |
| Robert Wysmierski | Men's sabre B | Shumate (USA) | W 5–0 | 1 Q | Bye | Heaton (GBR); W 15–4 | Durand (FRA); W 15–5 | Hui (HKG); W 15–4 | 1st place, gold medalist(s) |

==== Women ====
| Athlete | Event | Qualification | | | Round of 16 | Quarterfinal | Semifinal | Final / BM | |
| Athlete | Event | Opposition | Score | Rank | Opposition Score | Opposition Score | Opposition Score | Opposition Score | Rank |
|---|---|---|---|---|---|---|---|---|---|
| Renata Frelik | Women's épée A | Trigilia (ITA) | L 1–5 | 6 | did not advance | | | | |
| Renata Frelik | Women's épée A | Yu (HKG) | L 1–5 | 6 | did not advance | | | | |
| Renata Frelik | Women's épée A | Rossek (GER) | L 2–5 | 6 | did not advance | | | | |
| Renata Frelik | Women's épée A | Jurak (HUN) | L 1–5 | 6 | did not advance | | | | |
| Renata Frelik | Women's épée A | Meyer (FRA) | L 2–5 | 6 | did not advance | | | | |
| Renata Frelik | Women's foil A | Fan (HKG) | L 2–5 | 4 Q | Trigilia (ITA); L 4–15 | did not advance | | | |
| Renata Frelik | Women's foil A | Picot (FRA) | L 1–5 | 4 Q | Trigilia (ITA); L 4–15 | did not advance | | | |
| Renata Frelik | Women's foil A | Rossek (GER) | L 0–5 | 4 Q | Trigilia (ITA); L 4–15 | did not advance | | | |
| Renata Frelik | Women's foil A | Gilmore (USA) | L 2–5 | 4 Q | Trigilia (ITA); L 4–15 | did not advance | | | |
| Renata Frelik | Women's foil A | Tani (JPN) | W 5–1 | 4 Q | Trigilia (ITA); L 4–15 | did not advance | | | |
| Jadwiga Polasik | Women's épée A | Krajnyak (HUN) | L 2–3 | 2 Q | Presutto (ITA); W 15–6 | Trigilia (ITA); L 12–15 | did not advance | | |
| Jadwiga Polasik | Women's épée A | Assmann (FRA) | W 5–3 | 2 Q | Presutto (ITA); W 15–6 | Trigilia (ITA); L 12–15 | did not advance | | |
| Jadwiga Polasik | Women's épée A | Presutto (ITA) | W 5–1 | 2 Q | Presutto (ITA); W 15–6 | Trigilia (ITA); L 12–15 | did not advance | | |
| Jadwiga Polasik | Women's épée A | Gilmore (USA) | W 5–3 | 2 Q | Presutto (ITA); W 15–6 | Trigilia (ITA); L 12–15 | did not advance | | |
| Jadwiga Polasik | Women's épée A | Tani (JPN) | L 3–5 | 2 Q | Presutto (ITA); W 15–6 | Trigilia (ITA); L 12–15 | did not advance | | |
| Jadwiga Polasik | Women's foil A | Krajnyak (HUN) | L 1–5 | 3 Q | Witos (POL); L 11–15 | did not advance | | | |
| Jadwiga Polasik | Women's foil A | Meyer (FRA) | L 2–5 | 3 Q | Witos (POL); L 11–15 | did not advance | | | |
| Jadwiga Polasik | Women's foil A | Imeri (GER) | W 5–2 | 3 Q | Witos (POL); L 11–15 | did not advance | | | |
| Jadwiga Polasik | Women's foil A | Alexander (USA) | W 5–0 | 3 Q | Witos (POL); L 11–15 | did not advance | | | |
| Dagmara Witos | Women's épée A | Fan (HKG) | L 2–5 | 3 Q | Rossek (GER); L 11–15 | did not advance | | | |
| Dagmara Witos | Women's épée A | Picot (FRA) | L 4–5 | 3 Q | Rossek (GER); L 11–15 | did not advance | | | |
| Dagmara Witos | Women's épée A | Imeri (GER) | W 5–0 | 3 Q | Rossek (GER); L 11–15 | did not advance | | | |
| Dagmara Witos | Women's épée A | Alexander (USA) | W 5–0 | 3 Q | Rossek (GER); L 11–15 | did not advance | | | |
| Dagmara Witos | Women's foil A | Yu (HKG) | L 2–5 | 3 Q | Polasik (POL); W 15–11 | Fan (HKG); L 7–15 | did not advance | | |
| Dagmara Witos | Women's foil A | Trigilia (ITA) | L 0–5 | 3 Q | Polasik (POL); W 15–11 | Fan (HKG); L 7–15 | did not advance | | |
| Dagmara Witos | Women's foil A | Assmann (FRA) | W 5–4 | 3 Q | Polasik (POL); W 15–11 | Fan (HKG); L 7–15 | did not advance | | |
| Dagmara Witos | Women's foil A | Presutto (ITA) | W 5–2 | 3 Q | Polasik (POL); W 15–11 | Fan (HKG); L 7–15 | did not advance | | |
| Dagmara Witos | Women's foil A | Jurak (HUN) | W 5–2 | 3 Q | Polasik (POL); W 15–11 | Fan (HKG); L 7–15 | did not advance | | |
| Marta Wyrzykowska | Women's épée B | Vettraino (ITA) | W 5–3 | 1 Q | Bye | Palfi (HUN); W 15–2 | Jana (THA); L 9–15 | Dani (HUN); W 15–8 | 3rd place, bronze medalist(s) |
| Marta Wyrzykowska | Women's épée B | Lykyanenko (UKR) | W 5–0 | 1 Q | Bye | Palfi (HUN); W 15–2 | Jana (THA); L 9–15 | Dani (HUN); W 15–8 | 3rd place, bronze medalist(s) |
| Marta Wyrzykowska | Women's épée B | Hassen Bey (ESP) | W 5–1 | 1 Q | Bye | Palfi (HUN); W 15–2 | Jana (THA); L 9–15 | Dani (HUN); W 15–8 | 3rd place, bronze medalist(s) |
| Marta Wyrzykowska | Women's épée B | Masciotra (ARG) | W 5–1 | 1 Q | Bye | Palfi (HUN); W 15–2 | Jana (THA); L 9–15 | Dani (HUN); W 15–8 | 3rd place, bronze medalist(s) |
| Marta Wyrzykowska | Women's foil B | Chan (HKG) | L 2–5 | 3 Q | Weber Kranz (GER); W 15–7 | Jana (THA); L 7–15 | did not advance | | |
| Marta Wyrzykowska | Women's foil B | Hassen Bey (ESP) | L 3–5 | 3 Q | Weber Kranz (GER); W 15–7 | Jana (THA); L 7–15 | did not advance | | |
| Marta Wyrzykowska | Women's foil B | Lykyanenko (UKR) | W 5–0 | 3 Q | Weber Kranz (GER); W 15–7 | Jana (THA); L 7–15 | did not advance | | |
| Marta Wyrzykowska | Women's foil B | Masciotra (ARG) | W 5–0 | 3 Q | Weber Kranz (GER); W 15–7 | Jana (THA); L 7–15 | did not advance | | |

==== Teams ====
| Athlete | Event | Quarterfinal | Semifinal | Final / BM | |
| Athlete | Event | Opposition Score | Opposition Score | Opposition Score | Rank |
|---|---|---|---|---|---|
| Arkadiusz Jablonski; Dariusz Pender; Radoslaw Stanczuk; Robert Wysmierski | Men's épée team | Spain (ESP); W/O | China (CHN); W 45–34 | France (FRA); L 43–45 | 2nd place, silver medalist(s) |
| Piotr Czop; Stefan Makowski; Dariusz Pender; Tomasz Walisiewicz | Men's foil team | France (FRA); W 45–38 | China (CHN); L 41–45 | Kuwait (KUW); W 45–35 | 3rd place, bronze medalist(s) |
| Piotr Czop; Arkadiusz Jablonski; Stefan Makowski; Robert Wysmierski | Men's sabre team | Bye | France (FRA); W 45–39 | Hong Kong (HKG); L 43–45 | 2nd place, silver medalist(s) |
| Renata Frelik; Jadwiga Polasik; Dagmara Witos; Marta Wyrzykowska | Women's épée team | Germany (GER); W 45–39 | Hungary (HUN); L 42–45 | France (FRA); L 42–45 | 4 |
| Renata Frelik; Jadwiga Polasik; Dagmara Witos; Marta Wyrzykowska | Women's foil team | Germany (GER); W 45–38 | Hong Kong (HKG); L 20–45 | France (FRA); W 45–44 | 3rd place, bronze medalist(s) |

=== Wheelchair tennis ===
==== Men ====
| Athlete | Class | Event | Round of 64 | Round of 32 | Round of 16 | Quarterfinals | Semifinals | Finals |
| Athlete | Class | Event | Opposition Result | Opposition Result | Opposition Result | Opposition Result | Opposition Result | Opposition Result |
|---|---|---|---|---|---|---|---|---|
| Albin Batycki | Open | Men's singles | Saida (JPN); L 0–6, 0–6 | did not advance | | | | |
| Piotr Jaroszewski | Open | Men's singles | Liu (CHN); W 6–1, 6–0 | Welch (USA); L 3–6, 0–6 | did not advance | | | |
| Tadeusz Kruszelnicki | Open | Men's singles | Prohaszka (HUN); W 6–0, 6–0 | Gardner (GBR); W 6–0, 6–0 | Stuurman (NED); W 7–6, 0–6, 6–4 | Jérémiasz (FRA); L 5–7, 1–6 | did not advance | |
| Jerzy Kulik | Open | Men's singles | Bye | Kunieda (JPN); L 0–6, 2–6 | did not advance | | | |
| Albin Batycki; Jerzy Kulik | Open | Men's doubles | N/A | Kumararisi (SRI) / Silva (SRI); W 6–1, 6–1 | Kunieda (JPN) / Saida (JPN); L 0–6, 0–6 | did not advance | | |
| Piotr Jaroszewski; Tadeusz Kruszelnicki | Open | Men's doubles | N/A | Mira (ESP) / Tur (ESP); W 6–0, 6–1 | Gatelli (ITA) / Mazzei (ITA); W 6–2, 6–2 | Ammerlaan (NED) / Stuurman (NED); L 2–6, 3–6 | did not advance | |

==== Women ====
| Athlete | Class | Event | Round of 32 | Round of 16 | Quarterfinals | Semifinals | Finals |
| Athlete | Class | Event | Opposition Result | Opposition Result | Opposition Result | Opposition Result | Opposition Result |
|---|---|---|---|---|---|---|---|
| Agnieszka Bartczak | Open | Women's singles | Vidal (ESP); W 6–0, 6–0 | Gravellier (FRA); L 1–6, 0–6 | did not advance | | |

== See also ==
- Poland at the Paralympics
- Poland at the 2004 Summer Olympics
