= Wheelchair fencing at the 2004 Summer Paralympics – Men's foil A =

Wheelchair Fencing - Men's Foil Individual A at the XII Paralympic Games
- Paralympic Wheelchair Fencing
- Venue: Helliniko Fencing Hall
- Dates: 18 September 2004
- Competitors: 22 from 11 nations

Medalists
1st place, gold medalist(s)		Fung Ying Ki	Hong Kong
2nd place, silver medalist(s)		Zhang Lei	China
3rd place, bronze medalist(s)		Dariusz Pender	Poland

The Men's Foil Individual A wheelchair fencing competition at the 2004 Summer Paralympics was held on 18 September at the Helliniko Fencing Hall.

The event was won by Fung Ying Ki, representing Hong Kong.

== Results ==
=== Preliminaries ===
Qualified for final round

==== Pool A ====
Rank	Competitor	MP	W	L	Points	HKG	KUW	POL	FRA	ITA	MAS
1	Fung Ying Ki (HKG)	5	5	0	25:11	x	5:3	5:1	5:4	5:2	5:1
2	Tariq Al Qallaf (KUW)	5	4	1	23:17	3:5	x	5:4	5:2	5:3	5:3
3	Tomasz Walisiewicz (POL)	5	3	2	20:18	1:5	4:5	x	5:3	5:3	5:2
4	Moez El Assine (FRA)	5	2	3	19:19	4:5	2:5	3:5	x	5:3	5:1
5	Alberto Serafini (ITA)	5	1	4	16:22	2:5	3:5	3:5	3:5	x	5:2
6	Hamzah Dulah (MAS)	5	0	5	9:25	1:5	3:5	2:5	1:5	2:5	x

==== Pool B ====
Rank	Competitor	MP	W	L	Points	CHN	POL	HKG	USA	ESP	IRQ
1	Zhang Lei (CHN)	5	5	0	25:10	x	5:0	5:0	5:2	5:4	5:4
2	Stefan Makowski (POL)	5	4	1	20:11	0:5	x	5:4	5:1	5:0	5:1
3	Chan Kam Loi (HKG)	5	3	2	19:15	0:5	4:5	x	5:3	5:2	5:0
4	Gary van der Wege (USA)	5	2	3	16:17	2:5	1:5	3:5	x	5:0	5:2
5	Jesus Fernandez (ESP)	5	1	4	11:21	4:5	0:5	2:5	0:5	x	5:1
6	Kaled Khder (IRQ)	5	0	5	8:25	4:5	1:5	0:5	2:5	1:5	x

==== Pool C ====
Rank	Competitor	MP	W	L	Points	POL	HKG	FRA	GRE	USA
1	Dariusz Pender (POL)	4	4	0	20:2	x	5:0	5:0	5:2	5:0
2	Kwong Wai Ip (HKG)	4	2	2	14:10	0:5	x	4:5	5:0	5:0
3	Robert Citerne (FRA)	4	2	2	14:14	0:5	5:4	x	4:5	5:0
4	Nikolaos Peppas (GRE)	4	2	2	12:18	2:5	0:5	5:4	x	5:4
5	Mario Rodriguez (USA)	4	0	4	4:20	0:5	0:5	0:5	4:5	x

==== Pool D ====
Rank	Competitor	MP	W	L	Points	CHN	ITA	FRA	KUW	ESP
1	Zhang Chong (CHN)	4	4	0	20:3	x	5:2	5:0	5:1	5:0
2	Alberto Pellegrini (ITA)	4	3	1	17:11	2:5	x	5:3	5:0	5:3
3	David Maillard (FRA)	4	2	2	13:15	0:5	3:5	x	5:4	5:1
4	Mohammad Almansouri (KUW)	4	1	3	10:15	1:5	0:5	4:5	x	5:0
5	Alejandro Rodriguez (ESP)	4	0	4	4:20	0:5	3:5	1:5	0:5	x

=== Competition bracket ===
First round
Dariusz Pender (POL)	15
Mohammad Almansouri (KUW)	7
Tomasz Walisiewicz (POL)	13
Chan Kam Loi (HKG)	15
Stefan Makowski (POL)	13
David Maillard (FRA)	15
Nikolaos Peppas (GRE)	0
Fung Ying Ki (HKG)	15
Zhang Chong (CHN)	15
Moez El Assine (FRA)	7
Robert Citerne (FRA)	5
Tariq Al Qallaf (KUW)	15
Alberto Pellegrini (ITA)	15
Kwong Wai Ip (HKG)	8
Gary van der Wege (USA)	8
Zhang Lei (CHN)	15

Second round
Dariusz Pender (POL)	15
Chan Kam Loi (HKG)	8
David Maillard (FRA)	2
Fung Ying Ki (HKG)	15
Zhang Chong (CHN)	12
Tariq Al Qallaf (KUW)	15
Alberto Pellegrini (ITA)	10
Zhang Lei (CHN)	15

Semifinals
Dariusz Pender (POL)	9
Fung Ying Ki (HKG)	15
Tariq Al Qallaf (KUW)	9
Zhang Lei (CHN)	15

Finals
Fung Ying Ki (HKG)	15
Zhang Lei (CHN)	12
Third place
Dariusz Pender (POL)	15
Tariq Al Qallaf (KUW)	12
