= Wheelchair fencing at the 2004 Summer Paralympics – Men's foil team =

Wheelchair Fencing - Men's Foil Team at the XII Paralympic Games
- Paralympic Wheelchair Fencing
- Venue: Helliniko Fencing Hall
- Dates: 19 September 2004
- Competitors: 8

Medalists
1st place, gold medalist(s)		Hu Daoliang; Zhang Chong; Zhang Lei	China
2nd place, silver medalist(s)		Chan Kam Loi; Fung Ying Ki; Hui Charn Hung; Kwong Wai Ip	Hong Kong
3rd place, bronze medalist(s)		Tomasz Walisiewicz; Dariusz Pender; Stefan Makowski; Piotr Czop	Poland

The Men's Foil Team wheelchair fencing competition at the 2004 Summer Paralympics was held on 19 September at the Helliniko Fencing Hall.

The event was won by the team representing China.

== Results ==
=== Competition bracket ===
Quarterfinals
Hong Kong	45
Spain	6
Italy	38
Kuwait	45
China	45
United States	29
France	38
Poland	45

Semifinals
Hong Kong	45
Kuwait	42
China	45
Poland	41

Finals
Hong Kong	41
China	45
Third place
Kuwait	35
Poland	45

=== Classification 5-8 ===
Semi-finals
Spain	2
Italy	45
United States	21
France	45

Fifth place
Italy	45
France	39
Third place
Spain	6
United States	45

== Team Lists ==
China; Hu Daoliang; Zhang Chong; Zhang Lei	Spain; Juan Arnau; Jesus Fernandez; Alejandro Rodriguez	France; David Maillard; Laurent Francois; Moez El Assine; Pascal Durand	Hong Kong; Chan Kam Loi; Fung Ying Ki; Hui Charn Hung; Kwong Wai Ip
Italy; Alberto Serafini; Alessio Sarri; Alberto Pellegrini; Gerardo Mari	Kuwait; Mohammad Almansouri; Tariq Al Qallaf; Abdulwahab Alsaedi	Poland; Tomasz Walisiewicz; Dariusz Pender; Stefan Makowski; Piotr Czop	United States; Gerard Moreno; John Rodgers; Mario Rodriguez; Gary van der Wege
