= Wheelchair fencing at the 2004 Summer Paralympics – Men's épée A =

Wheelchair Fencing - Men's Epee Individual A at the XII Paralympic Games
- Paralympic Wheelchair Fencing
- Venue: Helliniko Fencing Hall
- Dates: 20 September 2004
- Competitors: 19 from 10 nations

Medalists
1st place, gold medalist(s)		Cyril Moré	France
2nd place, silver medalist(s)		Radoslaw Stanczuk	Poland
3rd place, bronze medalist(s)		Kwong Wai Ip	Hong Kong

The Men's Epee Individual A wheelchair fencing competition at the 2004 Summer Paralympics was held on 20 September at the Helliniko Fencing Hall.

The event was won by Cyril Moré, representing France.

== Results ==
=== Preliminaries ===
Qualified for final round

==== Pool A ====
Rank	Competitor	MP	W	L	Points	KUW	GER	POL	HKG	FRA	GRE	ESP
1	Tariq Al Qallaf (KUW)	6	5	1	28:15	x	3:5	5:2	5:3	5:1	5:1	5:3
2	Wilfried Lipinski (GER)	6	5	1	29:17	5:3	x	4:5	5:2	5:4	5:2	5:1
3	Arkadiusz Jablonski (POL)	6	5	1	27:23	2:5	5:4	x	5:4	5:4	5:2	5:4
4	Tai Yan Yun (HKG)	6	3	3	24:22	3:5	2:5	4:5	x	5:4	5:1	5:2
5	Cyril Moré (FRA)	6	2	4	23:24	1:5	4:5	4:5	4:5	x	5:1	5:3
6	Nikolaos Peppas (GRE)	6	1	5	12:29	1:5	2:5	2:5	1:5	1:5	x	5:4
7	Alejandro Rodriguez (ESP)	6	0	6	17:30	3:5	1:5	4:5	2:5	3:5	4:5	x

==== Pool B ====
Rank	Competitor	MP	W	L	Points	POL	CHN	FRA	GER	KUW	ESP
1	Radoslaw Stanczuk (POL)	5	5	0	25:9	x	5:3	5:3	5:1	5:0	5:2
2	Zhang Lei (CHN)	5	3	2	23:15	3:5	x	5:5	5:3	5:0	5:2
3	Robert Citerne (FRA)	5	2	3	23:19	3:5	5:5	x	5:3	5:5	5:1
4	Martin Ahner (GER)	5	2	3	17:21	1:5	3:5	3:5	x	5:4	5:2
5	Mohammad Almansouri (KUW)	5	1	4	14:23	0:5	0:5	5:5	4:5	x	5:3
6	Luis Sanchez (ESP)	5	0	5	10:25	2:5	2:5	1:5	2:5	3:5	x

==== Pool C ====
Rank	Competitor	MP	W	L	Points	FRA	POL	HUN	CHN	HKG	USA
1	David Maillard (FRA)	5	4	1	23:13	x	5:0	5:3	3:5	5:3	5:2
2	Dariusz Pender (POL)	5	4	1	20:14	0:5	x	5:3	5:4	5:2	5:0
3	Istvan Doeme (HUN)	5	3	2	21:17	3:5	3:5	x	5:2	5:4	5:1
4	Zhang Chong (CHN)	5	3	2	21:21	5:3	4:5	2:5	x	5:4	5:4
5	Kwong Wai Ip (HKG)	5	1	4	18:23	3:5	2:5	4:5	4:5	x	5:3
6	Gary van der Wege (USA)	5	0	5	10:25	2:5	0:5	1:5	4:5	3:5	x

=== Competition bracket ===
Round of 16
Istvan Doeme (HUN)	6
Robert Citerne (FRA)	15
David Maillard (FRA)	14
Martin Ahner (GER)	15
Mohammad Almansouri (KUW)	10
Arkadiusz Jablonski (POL)	15
Wilfried Lipinski (GER)	12
Cyril Moré (FRA)	15
Tai Yan Yun (HKG)	7
Dariusz Pender (POL)	15
Zhang Lei (CHN)	15
Zhang Chong (CHN)	14
Kwong Wai Ip (HKG)	15
Tariq Al Qallaf (KUW)	14

Quarterfinals
Radoslaw Stanczuk (POL)	15
Robert Citerne (FRA)	13
Martin Ahner (GER)	13
Arkadiusz Jablonski (POL)	15
Cyril Moré (FRA)	15
Dariusz Pender (POL)	12
Zhang Lei (CHN)	14
Kwong Wai Ip (HKG)	15

Semifinals
Radoslaw Stanczuk (POL)	15
Arkadiusz Jablonski (POL)	9
Cyril Moré (FRA)	15
Kwong Wai Ip (HKG)	13

Final
Radoslaw Stanczuk (POL)	11
Cyril Moré (FRA)	15
Third place
Arkadiusz Jablonski (POL)	10
Kwong Wai Ip (HKG)	15
