= Kuwait at the 2004 Summer Paralympics =

- IPC code: KUW
- NPC: Kuwait Paralympic Committee

in Athens
- Competitors: 14 in 2 sports
- Medals Ranked 48th: Gold 1 Silver 2 Bronze 3 Total 6

Summer Paralympics appearances (overview)
- 1980; 1984; 1988; 1992; 1996; 2000; 2004; 2008; 2012; 2016; 2020; 2024

Kuwait competed at the 2004 Summer Paralympics in Athens, Greece. The team included 14 athletes, 13 men and 1 women. Competitors from Kuwait won 6 medals, including 1 gold, 2 silver and 3 bronze to finish 48th in the medal table.

== Sports ==
=== Athletics ===
==== Men's track ====
Athlete	Class	Event	Heats		Semifinal		Final	
Athlete	Class	Event	Result	Rank	Result	Rank	Result	Rank
Hamad Aladwani	T53	100m	15.38	4 Q	—N/a		15.06	2nd place, silver medalist(s)
Hamad Aladwani	T53	200m	26.58	2 Q	—N/a		26.37	2nd place, silver medalist(s)
Hamad Aladwani	T53	400m	—N/a					1st place, gold medalist(s)

==== Men's field ====
Athlete	Class	Event	Final		
Athlete	Class	Event	Result	Points	Rank
Ahmed Abdullah	F32	Shot put	6.38	-	5
Atef Al-Dousari	F53	Discus	18.22	-	7
Dhari Al-Mutairi	F32	Shot put	6.86	-	3rd place, bronze medalist(s)
Mashal Al-Otaibi	F55-56	Javelin	28.12	878	12
Adel Alajmi	F58	Shot put	13.23	-	7
Ahmad Makhseed	F33-34	Discus	19.34	872	7
Ahmad Makhseed	F33-34	Shot put	7.63	795	10
Nezar Mohammad	P54-58	Pentathlon	4954		8
Fahad Salem	F58	Discus	47.96	-	7

==== Women's field ====
Athlete	Class	Event	Final		
Athlete	Class	Event	Result	Points	Rank
Maha Alsheraian	F32-34/51-53	Discus	9.94	1155	3rd place, bronze medalist(s)
Maha Alsheraian	F32-34/52/53	Shot put	5.26	1174	3rd place, bronze medalist(s)

=== Powerlifting ===
==== Men ====
Athlete	Event	Result	Rank
Sabah Al Shakhtali	60kg	145.0	10

=== Wheelchair fencing ===
==== Men ====
Athlete	Event	Qualification			Round of 16	Quarterfinal	Semifinal	Final / BM	
Athlete	Event	Opposition	Score	Rank	Opposition Score	Opposition Score	Opposition Score	Opposition Score	Rank
Mohammad Almansouri	Men's épée A	Stanczuk (POL)	L 0-5	5 Q	Jablonski (POL); L 10-15	did not advance			
Mohammad Almansouri	Men's épée A	Zhang (CHN)	L 0-5	5 Q	Jablonski (POL); L 10-15	did not advance			
Mohammad Almansouri	Men's épée A	Citerne (FRA)	L 5-5	5 Q	Jablonski (POL); L 10-15	did not advance			
Mohammad Almansouri	Men's épée A	Ahner (GER)	L 4-5	5 Q	Jablonski (POL); L 10-15	did not advance			
Mohammad Almansouri	Men's épée A	Sanchez (ESP)	W 5-3	5 Q	Jablonski (POL); L 10-15	did not advance			
Mohammad Almansouri	Men's foil A	Zhang C (CHN)	L 1-5	4 Q	Pender (POL); L 7-15	did not advance			
Mohammad Almansouri	Men's foil A	Pellegrini (ITA)	L 0-5	4 Q	Pender (POL); L 7-15	did not advance			
Mohammad Almansouri	Men's foil A	Maillard (FRA)	L 4-5	4 Q	Pender (POL); L 7-15	did not advance			
Mohammad Almansouri	Men's foil A	A Rodriguez (ESP)	W 5-0	4 Q	Pender (POL); L 7-15	did not advance			
Tariq Al Qallaf	Men's épée A	Lipinski (GER)	L 3–5	1 Q	Kwong (HKG); L 14-15	did not advance			
Tariq Al Qallaf	Men's épée A	Jablonski (POL)	W 5-2	1 Q	Kwong (HKG); L 14-15	did not advance			
Tariq Al Qallaf	Men's épée A	Tai (HKG)	W 5-3	1 Q	Kwong (HKG); L 14-15	did not advance			
Tariq Al Qallaf	Men's épée A	More (FRA)	W 5-1	1 Q	Kwong (HKG); L 14-15	did not advance			
Tariq Al Qallaf	Men's épée A	Peppas (GRE)	W 5-1	1 Q	Kwong (HKG); L 14-15	did not advance			
Tariq Al Qallaf	Men's épée A	Rodriguez (ESP)	W 5-3	1 Q	Kwong (HKG); L 14-15	did not advance			
Tariq Al Qallaf	Men's foil A	Fung (HKG)	L 3-5	2 Q	Citerne (FRA); W 15-5	Zhang C (CHN); W 15-12	Zhang L (CHN); L 9-15	Pender (POL); L 12-15	4
Tariq Al Qallaf	Men's foil A	Walisiewicz (POL)	W 5-4	2 Q	Citerne (FRA); W 15-5	Zhang C (CHN); W 15-12	Zhang L (CHN); L 9-15	Pender (POL); L 12-15	4
Tariq Al Qallaf	Men's foil A	El Assine (FRA)	W 5-2	2 Q	Citerne (FRA); W 15-5	Zhang C (CHN); W 15-12	Zhang L (CHN); L 9-15	Pender (POL); L 12-15	4
Tariq Al Qallaf	Men's foil A	Serafini (ITA)	W 5-3	2 Q	Citerne (FRA); W 15-5	Zhang C (CHN); W 15-12	Zhang L (CHN); L 9-15	Pender (POL); L 12-15	4
Tariq Al Qallaf	Men's foil A	Dulah (MAS)	W 5-3	2 Q	Citerne (FRA); W 15-5	Zhang C (CHN); W 15-12	Zhang L (CHN); L 9-15	Pender (POL); L 12-15	4
Abdulwahab Alsaedi	Men's épée B	Mayer (GER)	L 2-5	5 Q	Hu (CHN); L 11-15	did not advance			
Abdulwahab Alsaedi	Men's épée B	Lewonowski (POL)	L 4-5	5 Q	Hu (CHN); L 11-15	did not advance			
Abdulwahab Alsaedi	Men's épée B	Wong (HKG)	L 4-5	5 Q	Hu (CHN); L 11-15	did not advance			
Abdulwahab Alsaedi	Men's épée B	Latreche (FRA)	L 4-5	5 Q	Hu (CHN); L 11-15	did not advance			
Abdulwahab Alsaedi	Men's épée B	Shumate (USA)	W 5-4	5 Q	Hu (CHN); L 11-15	did not advance			
Abdulwahab Alsaedi	Men's foil B	Francois (FRA)	L 3-5	2 Q	Moreno (USA); W 15-3	Hui (HKG); L 0-15	did not advance		
Abdulwahab Alsaedi	Men's foil B	Hu (CHN)	L 2-5	2 Q	Moreno (USA); W 15-3	Hui (HKG); L 0-15	did not advance		
Abdulwahab Alsaedi	Men's foil B	Komar (UKR)	W 5-1	2 Q	Moreno (USA); W 15-3	Hui (HKG); L 0-15	did not advance		
Abdulwahab Alsaedi	Men's foil B	Wong (HKG)	W 5-2	2 Q	Moreno (USA); W 15-3	Hui (HKG); L 0-15	did not advance		

==== Teams ====
Athlete	Event	Quarterfinal	Semifinal	Final / BM	
Athlete	Event	Opposition Score	Opposition Score	Opposition Score	Rank
Mohammad Almansouri; Tariq Al Qallaf; Abdulwahab Alsaedi	Men's épée team	France (FRA); L 39–45	United States (USA); W 45–24	5th/6th classification Germany (GER); W 45–39	5
Mohammad Almansouri; Tariq Al Qallaf; Abdulwahab Alsaedi	Men's foil team	Italy (ITA); W 45-38	Hong Kong (HKG); L 42-45	Poland (POL); L 35-45	4

== See also ==
- Kuwait at the Paralympics
- Kuwait at the 2004 Summer Olympics
