= Mirosława Turowska =

Polish para table tennis player

Personal information
- Born: 8 November 1962 (age 63) Białystok, Poland

Sport
- Country: Poland
- Sport: Para table tennis
Medal record
Para table tennis
Representing Poland
Paralympic Games
| Silver medal – second place | 2004 Athens | Teams C6-10 |
World Championships
| Silver medal – second place | 2002 Taipei | Singles C8 |
| Bronze medal – third place | 2006 Montreux | Teams C6-8 |
European Championships
| Silver medal – second place | 2001 Frankfurt | Singles C8 |
| Silver medal – second place | 2001 Frankfurt | Teams C6-8 |
| Bronze medal – third place | 2003 Zagreb | Teams C6-9 |
| Bronze medal – third place | 2005 Jesolo | Teams C6-8 |
| Bronze medal – third place | 2007 Kranjska Gora | Teams C8 |

Mirosława Turowska (born 8 November 1962) is a Polish former para table tennis player who competed at international table tennis competitions. She is a Paralympic silver medalist, World silver medalist, and two-time European silver medalist.

In 1975, Turowska got hit by a truck while walking to school and had one of her legs amputated. She joined a sports training camp in her hometown and began track and field, she won many medals in the Polish national championships. Turowska switched to para table tennis in 1997 by which point she moved to Wisła and participated in the 2004 Summer Paralympics where she finished in fourth position.
