= Emmanuelle Assmann =

French fencer

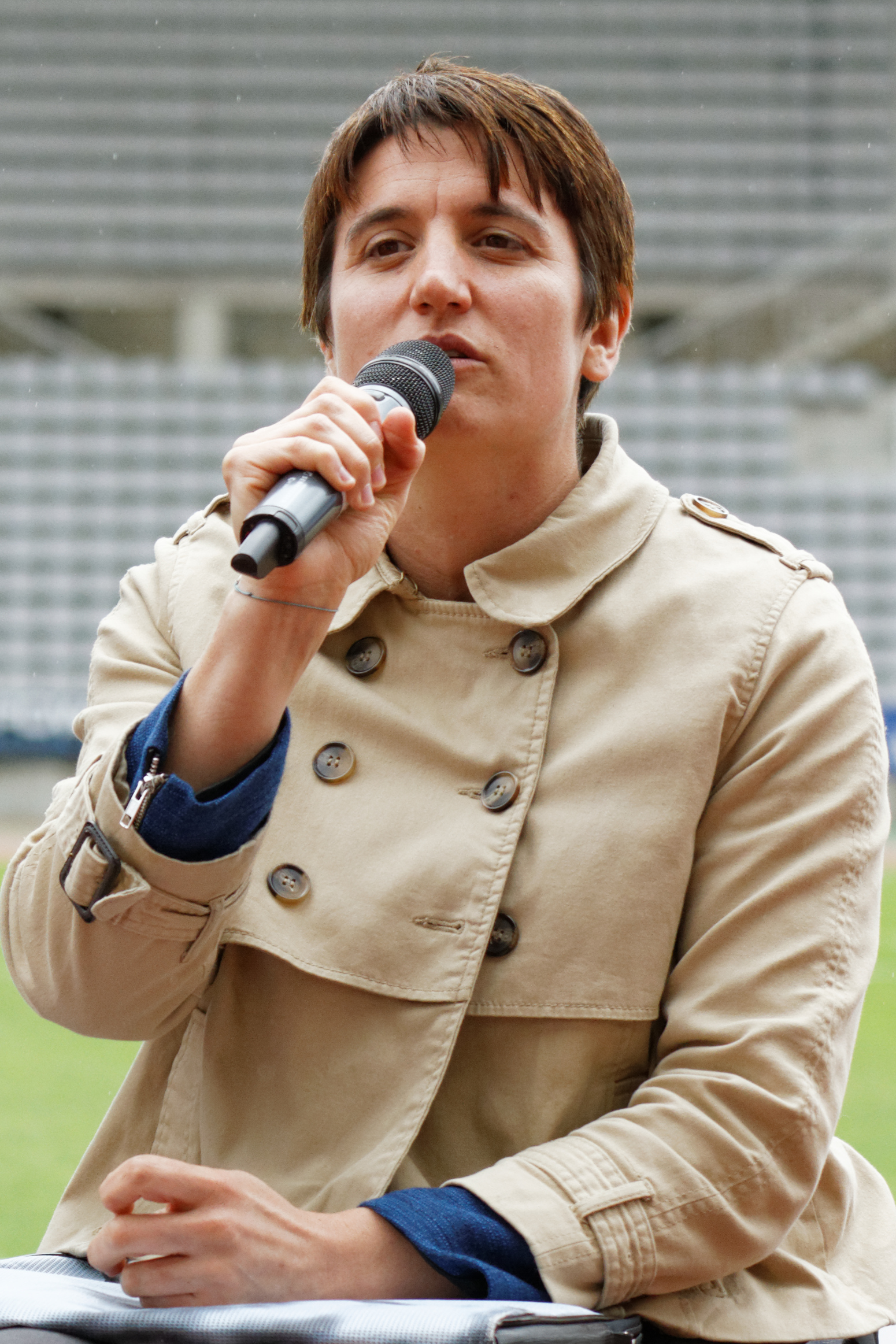
- Assmann at the Paralympic athletics meeting in Paris in 2014.

Personal information
- Born: 27 October 1974 (age 51) Le Raincy, France

Sport
- Country: France
- Sport: Wheelchair fencing
Medal record
Wheelchair fencing
Representing France
Paralympic Games
Bronze medal – third place	2004 Athens	Women's épée team

Emmanuelle Assmann (born October 27, 1974) is a French wheelchair fencer and a sports leader. She was chair of the French Paralympic and Sports Committee. She was awarded the Knight of the Legion of Honor, in 2013.

== Career ==
She competed at the 2004 Summer Paralympics in Athens, winning a bronze medal in women's épée team. She competed in Women's foil A, Women's foil team, and Women's épée A.

She works for EDF Sport Energie. She is a board member of the French Disabled Federation. She chaired the French Paralympic and Sports Committee (CPSF) from May 2013 to December 2018.
