= Fung Ying Ki =

Hong Kong wheelchair fencer (1980–2023)

Fung, Ying-ki
Personal information
- Born: 7 February 1980 British Hong Kong
- Died: 2 November 2023 (aged 43)

Sport
- Country: Hong Kong
- Sport: Wheelchair fencing
- Event(s): Sabre, foil
Medal record
Men's Wheelchair fencing
Paralympic Games
Gold medal – first place	2000 Sydney	Individual foil
Gold medal – first place	2000 Sydney	Team foil
Gold medal – first place	2000 Sydney	Individual sabre
Gold medal – first place	2004 Athens	Individual foil
Gold medal – first place	2004 Athens	Team sabre
Silver medal – second place	2004 Athens	Team foil
Bronze medal – third place	2000 Sydney	Team sabre
- Updated on 8 September 2010

Fung Ying-ki (Chinese: 馮英騏; Jyutping: fung^{4} jing^{1} kei^{4}; 7 February 1980 – 2 November 2023) was a Hong Kong Paralympic wheelchair fencer. At the 2000 Summer Paralympics, he won three gold medals in the men's individual foil, team foil, and individual sabre events and took bronze in team sabre. Four years later at the Athens Paralympics, he won two golds in individual foil and team sabre and a silver in team foil.

Fung lost the use of his legs as a child after contracting a virus which damaged his spinal cord (acute transverse myelitis in 1994 with paraplegia). At age 15, he began practicing wheelchair fencing at a national training facility in Hong Kong (Hong Kong Sports Institute). After the 2004 Paralympic Games, he relearned to walk with lower limbs sensation deficiency and retired from fencing.

In the months leading up to the 2008 Summer Paralympics in Beijing, Fung coached Japanese wheelchair fencer Toyoaki Hisakawa in preparation for the games.

In later years, he started participating in wheelchair marathon. He completed his first full marathon in Osaka, Japan in 2011. Then in 2012, he completed the Standard Chartered Hong Kong Marathon and was the first local wheelchair racer to complete the entire course. In 2013, he won the wheelchair half-marathon for the same event. He hoped that the increasing profile of wheelchair events locally could provide more opportunities and choices to the athletes with disabilities in Hong Kong.

Fung died on 2 November 2023, at the age of 43.

== Education ==
Fung studied at Kiangsu-Chekiang College (Shatin) during his early years and he received a B.A. with honors in Physical Education and Recreation Management from Hong Kong Baptist University and a MEd in Sports Biomechanics from National Taiwan Normal University. He was also a graduate of the first cohort of Master in Physiotherapy degree (MPT) of the Hong Kong Polytechnic University in 2013. He was a PhD candidate at the Department of Orthopaedics and Traumatology, Faculty of Medicine, The Chinese University of Hong Kong.

In the summer of 2010, Fung received a Postgraduate Travel Award from International Society on Biomechanics in Sports, and he was a commission member of Hong Kong Association of Sports Medicine and Sports Science from 2010 to 2012. Meanwhile, he was one of the classification committee member of International Paralympic Committee (IPC) from 2010 to 2014.

== Research interest ==
- Classification system in Paralympics Sports
- Cluster analysis
- Computational modeling
- Sports Equipment Technology (SET)
- Muscle mechanics
- Motion analysis in sports

== Published conference abstracts ==
1. Fung YK, Chan MS, Lee YS, Shiang TY (2017).The comparison of EMG characteristics and metabolic cost between walking and running near preferred transition speed. Journal of Biomechanical Science and Engineering, 12(2), xxx-xxx
2. Chung MML, Chan WYR, Fung YK, Fong SMS, Lam SLS, Lai WKC, Ng SMS (2014). Reliability and validity of alternate step test times in subjects with chronic stroke. Journal of Rehabilitation Medicine, 46, 969-974
3. Chan DKC, Fung YK, Xing S, Hagger MS (2014). Myopia prevention, near work, and visual acuity of college students: integrating the theory of planned behavior and self-determination theory. Journal of Behavioral Medicine, 37(1), 369-380
4. Fung YK, Chan DKC, Caudwell KM, Chow BC (2013). Is the wheelchair fencing classification fair enough? A kinematic analysis among world-class wheelchair fencers. European Journal of Adapted Physical Activity, 6(1), 17-29
5. Chung, WM, Fung YK (2012). Sports medicine for the physically disabled. The Hong Kong Medical Diary, 16(12), 20-22
6. Chan DKC, Fung YK, Hagger MS (2012). Motivation for myopia prevention: a preliminary test of the trans-contextual model. Psychology and Health, 27, 18-19
7. Yung PSH, Fung YK, Chung MML, Wong CWY, Fong DTP, Chan KM (2010). Clinical practice of thumb kinematics analysis for Carpal Tunnel Syndrome - a pilot study. In Proceedings of the 30th Annual Congress of The Hong Kong Orthopaedic Association (pp. 96), Hong Kong, China. [ 27–28 Nov 2010].
8. Yung PSH, Chan YW, Fung YK, Chung MML, Fong DTP, Chan KM (2010). An inexpensive functional finger prosthesis with rebounded type progressive hinge lock. In Proceedings of the 30th Annual Congress of The Hong Kong Orthopaedic Association (pp. 95), Hong Kong, China. [ 27–28 Nov 2010].
9. Yung PSH, Chung MML, Fung YK, Fong DTP, Chan KM (2010). A portable pressure meter for scoliosis brace fitting. In Proceedings of the 30th Annual Congress of The Hong Kong Orthopaedic Association (pp. 93), Hong Kong, China. [ 27–28 Nov 2010].
10. Fong DTP, Chan YYW, Fung YK, Wong CWY, Hung LK, Liao WH (2010). An inexpensive functional finger prosthesis. In Proceedings of SMART - Sports Medicine And Rehabilitation Therapy 2010 Convention (pp. 10–11), Hong Kong, China. [9 Oct 2010].
11. Fung YK, Chow BC, Fong DTP, Chan KM (2010). A kinematic analysis of trunk ability in wheelchair fencing: a pilot study. In Proceedings of XXVIII International Conference on Biomechanics in Sports (pp. 126–129), Marquette, USA. [ 19–23 Jul 2010].
12. Fung YK, Chan KM (2010). Functional ability between different categories of wheelchair fencer. In Proceedings of the 3rd HKASMSS Student Conference on Sport Medicine, Rehabilitation and Exercise Science (pp. 21–22), Hong Kong, China. [19 Jun 2010].
13. Fung YK, Shiang TY, Huang CF (2008). Kinetic analysis to poweriser (An energy storage and return spring device). In Proceedings of XXVI International Conference on Biomechanics in Sports, (pp. 366–369), Seoul, Korea. [ 14–18 Jul 2008].
