= Gary van der Wege =

American wheelchair fencer

Personal information
- Nationality: United States
- Born: 1955 (age 70–71) Kalamazoo, Michigan
- Height: 6 ft (1.8 m)
Medal record
Athletics
Pan American Zonal Championship
Gold medal – first place	2011 Pan American Zonal Championship	Men's epee fencing

Gary van der Wege (born 1955) is an American wheelchair fencer from Kalamazoo, Michigan who won a gold medal in the 2011 Pan American Zonal Championship. Currently he works as a coach at both Salle Poujardieu and San Antonio Fencing Center.
