= Dariusz Pender =

Polish wheelchair fencer

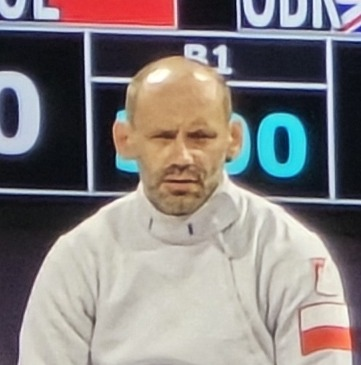

Personal information
- Born: 16 October 1974 (age 50)

Sport
- Country: Poland
- Sport: Wheelchair fencing

Dariusz Pender (born 16 October 1974) is a Polish wheelchair fencer. In 2000, he won the gold medal in the men's épée individual A event at the 2000 Summer Paralympics held in Sydney, Australia. He also won the silver medal in the men's foil team event. Pender also won medals at the Summer Paralympics in 2004, 2008, 2012 and 2016.
