= Table tennis at the 2004 Summer Paralympics =

Table tennis at the XII Paralympic Games
- Venue: Galatsi Olympic Hall
- Dates: 18–27 September 2004
- Competitors: 239 from 43 nations

Table tennis at the 2004 Summer Paralympics was staged at the Galatsi Olympic Hall from September 18 to September 27.

Competitors were divided into ten classes according to the extent of their disability, with lower numbered classes corresponding to more severe disabilities. Classes one through five competed in wheelchairs, and classes six through ten competed while standing.

== Participating countries ==
- Argentina (3)
- Austria (7)
- Belgium (5)
- Brazil (5)
- Chile (1)
- China (13)
- Chinese Taipei (8)
- Croatia (4)
- Cuba (2)
- Czech Republic (13)
- Denmark (2)
- Egypt (3)
- Finland (2)
- France (29)
- Germany (18)
- Great Britain (8)
- Greece (3)
- Hong Kong (2)
- Hungary (5)
- Iceland (1)
- Iran (3)
- Israel (2)
- Italy (5)
- Japan (8)
- Jordan (4)
- Liechtenstein (1)
- Mexico (5)
- Netherlands (5)
- Norway (2)
- Poland (9)
- Russia (4)
- Serbia and Montenegro (2)
- Slovakia (10)
- Slovenia (2)
- South Africa (5)
- South Korea (13)
- Spain (7)
- Sweden (8)
- Switzerland (3)
- Turkey (1)
- Ukraine (2)
- United States (3)
- Venezuela (1)

== Medal summary ==
=== Medal table ===
Rank	Nation	Gold	Silver	Bronze	Total
1	China (CHN)	7	3	3	13
2	South Korea (KOR)	5	4	2	11
3	Germany (GER)	4	2	3	9
4	France (FRA)	3	6	5	14
5	Slovakia (SVK)	2	1	3	6
6	Belgium (BEL)	2	1	0	3
7	Czech Republic (CZE)	1	2	0	3
7	Poland (POL)	1	2	0	3
9	Austria (AUT)	1	1	0	2
10	Netherlands (NED)	1	0	0	1
10	Slovenia (SLO)	1	0	0	1
12	Sweden (SWE)	0	2	2	4
13	Chinese Taipei (TPE)	0	1	2	3
14	Great Britain (GBR)	0	1	1	2
15	Italy (ITA)	0	1	0	1
16	Denmark (DEN)	0	0	1	1
16	Jordan (JOR)	0	0	1	1
16	Russia (RUS)	0	0	1	1
16	Serbia and Montenegro (SCG)	0	0	1	1
16	Spain (ESP)	0	0	1	1
16	United States (USA)	0	0	1	1
Totals (21 entries)		28	27	27	82

=== Men's events ===
Event	Gold	Silver	Bronze
Singles class 1	Holger Nikelis; Germany	Hae Gon Lee; South Korea	Walter Kilger; Germany
Singles class 2	Ján Riapoš; Slovakia	Gong Yong Kim; South Korea	Kyung Mook Kim; South Korea
Singles class 3	Young Gun Kim; South Korea	Jean-Philippe Robin; France	Zlatko Kesler; Serbia and Montenegro
Singles class 4	Yan Zhang; China	Michal Stefanu; Czech Republic	Kyoung Sik Choi; South Korea
Singles class 5	Byoung Young Kim; South Korea	Eun Chang Jung; South Korea	Christophe Durand; France
Singles class 6	Daniel Arnold; Germany	Rainer Schmidt; Germany	Peter Rosenmeier; Denmark
Singles class 7	Stephane Messi; France	Jochen Wollmert; Germany	Jordi Morales; Spain
Singles class 8	Mathieu Loicq; Belgium	Marc Ledoux; Belgium	Richard Csejtey; Slovakia
Singles class 9	Stanisław Frączyk; Austria	Xiao Lei Lu; China	Tahl Leibovitz; United States
Singles class 10	Ladislav Gaspar; Slovakia	Fredrik Andersson; Sweden	Ge Yang; China
Teams class 1–2	South Korea (KOR); Seong Hoon Kang; Gong Yong Kim; Kyung Mook Kim; Hae Gon Lee	Slovakia (SVK); Rastislav Revúcky; Ján Riapoš	Germany (GER); Thorsten Gruenkemeyer; Walter Kilger; Holger Nikelis; Otto Vilsmaier
Teams class 3	South Korea (KOR); Young Gun Kim; Heung Sik Yang; Jae Kwan Cho	Great Britain (GBR); James Rawson; Neil Robinson; Stefan Trofan	France (FRA); Pascal Verger; Jean-Philippe Robin
Teams class 4	South Korea (KOR); Kyoung Sik Choi; Tae Hyung Um; Park Jun-young	France (FRA); Sebastien Pechard; Emeric Martin; Bruno Benedetti	China (CHN); Jie Zhang; Yan Zhang
Teams class 5	Czech Republic (CZE); Rene Taus; Michal Stefanu; Frantisek Glazar	South Korea (KOR); Eun Chang Jung; Byoung Young Kim	France (FRA); Gregory Rosec; Christophe Durand
Teams class 6–7	Germany (GER); Rainer Schmidt; Daniel Arnold; Dieter Meyer; Jochen Wollmert	Poland (POL); Adam Jurasz; Miroslaw Kowalski	Sweden (SWE); Simon Itkonen; Linus Loennberg
Teams class 8	Belgium (BEL); Nico Vergeylen; Mathieu Loicq; Marc Ledoux	France (FRA); Alain Pichon; Michel Schaller; Julien Soyer	Slovakia (SVK); Richard Csejtey; Miroslav Mitas
Teams class 9	Netherlands (NED); Gerben Last; Tonnie Heijnen	Austria (AUT); Stanisław Frączyk; Rene Gutdeutsch	Chinese Taipei (TPE); Chih Shan Hsu; Ming Fu Hu
Teams class 10	China (CHN); Lu Xiaolei; Ge Yang	France (FRA); François Sérignat; Olivier Chateigner; Gilles de la Bourdonnaye	Sweden (SWE); Magnus Andree; Fredrik Andersson

=== Women's events ===
Event	Gold	Silver	Bronze
Singles class 1–2	Isabelle Lafaye Marziou; France	Genevieve Clot; France	Catherine Mitton; Great Britain
Singles class 3	Mateja Pintar; Slovenia	Stephanie Mariage; France	Alena Kánová; Slovakia
Singles class 4	Monika Sikora Weinmann; Germany	Valeria Zorzetto; Italy	Christiane Pape; Germany
Singles class 5	Gui Xiang Ren; China	Wei Hong Chen; China	Mei Hui Wei; Chinese Taipei
Singles class 6–8	Xiaoling Zhang; China	Marléen Bengtsson-Kovacs; Sweden	Julija Ovsjannikova; Russia
Singles class 9	Meili Liu; China	Lina Lei; China	Thu Kamkasomphou; France
Singles class 10	Natalia Partyka; Poland	Jolana Matouskova; Czech Republic	Yu Qiang Li; China
Teams class 1–3	France (FRA); Genevieve Clot; Isabelle Lafaye Marziou; Stephanie Mariage		
Teams class 4–5	China (CHN); Gai Gu; Gui Xiang Ren; Wei Hong Chen	Chinese Taipei (TPE); Mei Hui Wei; Shu Chin Hsiao	Jordan (JOR); Khetam Abuawad; Maha Al-Bargouti; Fatemah Al Azzam
Teams class 6–10	China (CHN); Lina Lei; Yu Qiang Li; Xiaoling Zhang; Mei Li Liu	Poland (POL); Mirosława Turowska; Natalia Partyka; Krystyna Jagodzińska; Małgorzata Grzelak	France (FRA); Claire Mairie; Audrey Le Morvan; Michelle Sévin; Thu Kamkasomphou

== See also ==
- Table tennis at the 2004 Summer Olympics
