= Table tennis at the 2004 Summer Paralympics – Men's individual – Class 8 =

Table Tennis - Men's Singles 8 at the XII Paralympic Games
- Paralympic Table Tennis
- Venue: Galatsi Olympic Hall
- Dates: 18–21 September 2004
- Competitors: 20 from 15 nations

Medalists
1st place, gold medalist(s)		Mathieu Loicq	Belgium
2nd place, silver medalist(s)		Marc Ledoux	Belgium
3rd place, bronze medalist(s)		Richard Csejtey	Slovakia

The Men's Singles 8 table tennis competition at the 2004 Summer Paralympics was held from 18 to 21 September at the Galatsi Olympic Hall.

Classes 6–10 were for athletes with a physical impairment who competed from a standing position; the lower the number, the greater the impact the impairment had on an athlete's ability to compete.

The event was won by Mathieu Loicq, representing Belgium.

== Results ==
=== Preliminaries ===
Qualified for final round

==== Group A ====
Rank	Competitor	MP	W	L	Points	SVK	BEL	KOR	CRO
1	Richard Csejtey (SVK)	3	3	0	9:1	x	3:0	3:1	3:0
2	Mathieu Loicq (BEL)	3	2	1	6:5	0:3	x	3:1	3:1
3	Lee Cheon Sik (KOR)	3	1	2	5:7	1:3	1:3	x	3:1
4	Ratko Kovacic (CRO)	3	0	3	2:9	0:3	1:3	1:3	x

==== Group B ====
Rank	Competitor	MP	W	L	Points	LIE	BEL	FRA	HUN
1	Peter Frommelt (LIE)	3	3	0	9:1	x	3:0	3:1	3:0
2	Nico Vergeylen (BEL)	3	1	2	5:7	0:3	x	3:1	2:3
3	Alain Pichon (FRA)	3	1	2	5:7	1:3	1:3	x	3:1
4	Andras Csonka (HUN)	3	1	2	4:8	0:3	3:2	1:3	x

==== Group C ====
Rank	Competitor	MP	W	L	Points	BEL	CZE	USA	RSA
1	Marc Ledoux (BEL)	3	3	0	9:2	x	3:0	3:2	3:0
2	Jiri Soukup (CZE)	3	2	1	6:4	0:3	x	3:0	3:1
3	Wayne Lo (USA)	3	1	2	5:7	2:3	0:3	x	3:1
4	Johan du Plooy (RSA)	3	0	3	2:9	0:3	1:3	1:3	x

==== Group D ====
Rank	Competitor	MP	W	L	Points	CHN	ESP	TPE	FRA
1	Li Manzhou (CHN)	3	3	0	9:3	x	3:1	3:1	3:1
2	Alvaro Valera (ESP)	3	2	1	7:6	1:3	x	3:2	3:1
3	Hu Ming Fu (TPE)	3	1	2	6:6	1:3	2:3	x	3:0
4	Julien Soyer (FRA)	3	0	3	2:9	1:3	1:3	0:3	x

==== Group E ====
Rank	Competitor	MP	W	L	Points	ISR	FRA	POL	SVK
1	Zeev Glikman (ISR)	3	3	0	9:1	x	3:1	3:0	3:0
2	Michel Schaller (FRA)	3	2	1	7:5	1:3	x	3:2	3:0
3	Marcin Skrzynecki (POL)	3	1	2	5:8	0:3	2:3	x	3:2
4	Miroslav Mitas (SVK)	3	0	3	2:9	0:3	0:3	2:3	x

=== Competition bracket ===
Round of 16
Alvaro Valera (ESP)	0
Michel Schaller (FRA)	3

Quarterfinals
Richard Csejtey (SVK)	3
Nico Vergeylen (BEL)	0
Michel Schaller (FRA)	2
Marc Ledoux (BEL)	3
Li Manzhou (CHN)	2
Mathieu Loicq (BEL)	3
Jiri Soukup (CZE)	2
Peter Frommelt (LIE)	3

Semifinals
Richard Csejtey (SVK)	1
Marc Ledoux (BEL)	3
Mathieu Loicq (BEL)	3
Peter Frommelt (LIE)	1

Final
Marc Ledoux (BEL)	0
Mathieu Loicq (BEL)	3
Third place
Richard Csejtey (SVK)	3
Peter Frommelt (LIE)	0
