= Table tennis at the 2008 Summer Paralympics – Men's individual – Class 8 =

Men's Individual Class 8 at the XIII Paralympic Games
- Venue: Peking University Gymnasium
- Dates: 7 – 11 September 2008
- Competitors: 16 from 9 nations

Medalists
1st place, gold medalist(s)		Chen Gang	China
2nd place, silver medalist(s)		Piotr Grudzień	Poland
3rd place, bronze medalist(s)		Miroslav Jambor	Slovakia

The Men's Individual Class 8 table tennis competition at the 2008 Summer Paralympics was held between 7 September and 11 September at the Peking University Gymnasium.

Classes 6–10 were for athletes with a physical impairment who competed from a standing position; the lower the number, the greater the impact the impairment had on an athlete's ability to compete.

The event was won by Chen Gang, representing China.

== Results ==
=== Preliminary round ===
Qualified for the knock-out stages

==== Group A ====
Rank	Competitor	MP	W	L	Points	CHN	SVK	FRA	TPE
1	Li Manzhou (CHN)	3	2	1	8:5	x	2:3	3:1	3:1
2	Richard Csejtey (SVK)	3	2	1	8:5	3:2	x	2:3	3:0
3	Francois Serignat (FRA)	3	2	1	7:7	1:3	3:2	x	3:2
4	Hou Ting Sung (TPE)	3	0	3	3:9	1:3	0:3	2:3	x

7 September, 11:20

Francois Serignat (FRA)	8	11	11	11	13
Hou Ting-sung (TPE)	11	5	13	6	11
Richard Csejtey (SVK)	11	5	11	9	11
Li Manzhou (CHN)	7	11	8	11	5

9 September, 10:00

Li Manzhou (CHN)	12	6	11	13
Francois Serignat (FRA)	10	11	9	11
Richard Csejtey (SVK)	11	11	11	
Hou Ting-sung (TPE)	6	6	7	

9 September, 19:20

Li Manzhou (CHN)	6	11	12	11	
Hou Ting-sung (TPE)	11	6	10	6	
Francois Serignat (FRA)	15	9	9	11	11
Richard Csejtey (SVK)	13	11	11	7	9

==== Group B ====
Rank	Competitor	MP	W	L	Points	POL	BEL	TPE	FRA
1	Piotr Grudzień (POL)	3	2	1	7:4	x	3:0	1:3	3:1
2	Mathieu Loicq (BEL)	3	2	1	6:5	0:3	x	3:1	3:1
3	Hu Ming Fu (TPE)	3	1	2	6:7	3:1	1:3	x	2:3
4	Alain Pichon (FRA)	3	1	2	5:8	1:3	1:3	3:2	x

7 September, 11:20

Hu Ming-fu (TPE)	7	11	11	14
Piotr Grudzień (POL)	11	4	5	12
Mathieu Loicq (BEL)	10	11	11	11
Alain Pichon (FRA)	12	4	6	2

9 September, 10:00

Alain Pichon (FRA)	5	11	11	5	11
Hu Ming-fu (TPE)	11	6	9	11	3
Piotr Grudzień (POL)	12	11	13		
Mathieu Loicq (BEL)	10	8	11		

9 September, 19:20

Piotr Grudzień (POL)	7	16	11	11
Alain Pichon (FRA)	11	14	9	9
Mathieu Loicq (BEL)	6	11	11	11
Hu Ming-fu (TPE)	11	6	7	9

==== Group C ====
Rank	Competitor	MP	W	L	Points	BEL	ISR	SVK	CAN
1	Miroslav Jambor (SVK)	3	2	1	8:7	2:3	3:2	x	3:2
2	Zeev Glikman (ISR)	3	2	1	8:6	3:2	x	2:3	3:1
3	Marc Ledoux (BEL)	3	2	1	8:5	x	2:3	3:2	3:0
4	Ian Kent (CAN)	3	0	3	3:9	0:3	1:3	2:3	x

7 September, 11:20

Zeev Glikman (ISR)	11	11	8	11	
Ian Kent (CAN)	5	8	11	5	
Marc Ledoux (BEL)	7	16	11	4	11
Miroslav Jambor (SVK)	11	14	4	11	6

9 September, 10:00

Miroslav Jambor (SVK)	11	7	11	11	11
Zeev Glikman (ISR)	13	11	5	3	8
Marc Ledoux (BEL)	11	11	11		
Ian Kent (CAN)	6	5	3		

9 September, 19:20

Miroslav Jambor (SVK)	8	11	9	11	11
Ian Kent (CAN)	11	4	11	6	8
Zeev Glikman (ISR)	9	11	6	11	11
Marc Ledoux (BEL)	11	9	11	7	6

==== Group D ====
Rank	Competitor	MP	W	L	Points	CHN	HUN	POL	BEL
1	Chen Gang (CHN)	3	3	0	9:0	x	3:0	3:0	3:0
2	András Csonka (HUN)	3	2	1	6:4	0:3	x	3:1	3:0
3	Marcin Skrzynecki (POL)	3	1	2	4:7	0:3	1:3	x	3:1
4	Nico Vergeylen (BEL)	3	0	3	1:9	0:3	0:3	1:3	x

7 September, 11:20

Marcin Skrzynecki (POL)	11	8	11	11
Nico Vergeylen (BEL)	4	11	9	3
Chen Gang (CHN)	11	11	12	
András Csonka (HUN)	9	7	10	

9 September, 10:00

Chen Gang (CHN)	11	11	11
Marcin Skrzynecki (POL)	4	5	3
András Csonka (HUN)	12	11	11
Nico Vergeylen (BEL)	10	8	3

9 September, 19:20

Chen Gang (CHN)	12	11	11	
Nico Vergeylen (BEL)	10	5	8	
András Csonka (HUN)	5	11	12	15
Marcin Skrzynecki (POL)	11	8	10	13

=== Competition bracket ===
Semifinals: 10 Sep 12:15
Li Manzhou (CHN)	11	3	5	8
Chen Gang (CHN)	7	11	11	11
Miroslav Jambor (SVK)	8	10	5
Piotr Grudzień (POL)	11	12	11

Gold medal match: 11 Sep 18:15
Chen Gang (CHN)	15	11	11	11
Piotr Grudzień (POL)	17	6	5	6
Bronze medal match: 11 Sep 18:15
Li Manzhou (CHN)	14	11	11	1	5
Miroslav Jambor (SVK)	16	6	9	11	11
