= Table tennis at the 2004 Summer Paralympics – Women's individual – Class 3 =

Table Tennis - Women's Singles 3 at the XII Paralympic Games
- Paralympic Table Tennis
- Venue: Galatsi Olympic Hall
- Dates: 18–21 September 2004
- Competitors: 10 from 8 nations

Medalists
1st place, gold medalist(s)		Mateja Pintar	Slovenia
2nd place, silver medalist(s)		Stephanie Mariage	France
3rd place, bronze medalist(s)		Alena Kanova	Slovakia

The Women's Singles 3 table tennis competition at the 2004 Summer Paralympics was held from 18 to 21 September at the Galatsi Olympic Hall.

Classes 1-5 were for athletes with a physical impairment that affected their legs, who competed in a sitting position. The lower the number, the greater the impact the impairment was on an athlete’s ability to compete.

The event was won by Mateja Pintar, representing Slovenia.

== Results ==
=== Preliminaries ===
Qualified for final round

==== Group A ====
Rank	Competitor	MP	W	L	Points	SVK	FRA	GER
1	Alena Kanova (SVK)	2	2	0	6:1	x	3:1	3:0
2	Valerie Gay (FRA)	2	1	1	4:4	1:3	x	3:1
3	Monika Bartheidel (GER)	2	0	2	1:6	0:3	1:3	x

==== Group B ====
Rank	Competitor	MP	W	L	Points	SLO	JPN	RSA
1	Mateja Pintar (SLO)	2	2	0	6:0	x	3:0	3:0
2	Satoko Fujiwara (JPN)	2	1	1	3:3	0:3	x	3:0
3	Aletta Moll (RSA)	2	0	2	0:6	0:3	0:3	x

==== Group C ====
Rank	Competitor	MP	W	L	Points	FRA	JPN	NED	CUB
1	Stephanie Mariage (FRA)	3	3	0	9:1	x	3:0	3:0	3:1
2	Tomoko Fukuzawa (JPN)	3	2	1	6:4	0:3	x	3:0	3:1
3	Jolanda Paardekam (NED)	3	1	2	3:7	0:3	0:3	x	3:1
4	Mora Yanelis Silva (CUB)	3	0	3	3:9	1:3	1:3	1:3	x

=== Competition bracket ===
Quarterfinals
Satoko Fujiwara (JPN)	2
Stephanie Mariage (FRA)	3
Valerie Gay (FRA)	3
Tomoko Fukuzawa (JPN)	0

Semifinals
Alena Kanova (SVK)	2
Stephanie Mariage (FRA)	3
Valerie Gay (FRA)	2
Mateja Pintar (SLO)	3

Finals
Stephanie Mariage (FRA)	1
Mateja Pintar (SLO)	3
Third place
Alena Kanova (SVK)	3
Valerie Gay (FRA)	0
