= Table tennis at the 2004 Summer Paralympics – Men's team – Class 8 =

Table Tennis - Men's Teams 8 at the XII Paralympic Games
- Paralympic Table Tennis
- Venue: Galatsi Olympic Hall
- Dates: 23–27 September 2004
- Competitors: 7

Medalists
1st place, gold medalist(s)		Nico Vergeylen; Mathieu Loicq; Marc Ledoux	Belgium
2nd place, silver medalist(s)		Alain Pichon; Michel Schaller; Julien Soyer	France
3rd place, bronze medalist(s)		Richard Csejtey; Miroslav Mitas	Slovakia

The Men's Teams 8 table tennis competition at the 2004 Summer Paralympics was held 23–27 September 2004 at the Galatsi Olympic Hall.

Classes 6–10 were for athletes with a physical impairment who competed from a standing position; the lower the number, the greater the impact the impairment had on an athlete’s ability to compete.

The event was won by the team representing Belgium.

== Results ==
=== Preliminaries ===
Qualified for final round

==== Group A ====
Rank	Competitor	MP	W	L	Points	FRA	SVK	RSA
1	France	2	2	0	6:0	x	3:0	3:0
2	Slovakia	2	1	1	3:3	0:3	x	3:0
3	South Africa	2	0	2	0:6	0:3	0:3	x

==== Group B ====
Rank	Competitor	MP	W	L	Points	BEL	CHN	ESP	CZE
1	Belgium	3	2	1	7:3	x	3:0	1:3	3:0
2	China	3	2	1	6:4	0:3	x	3:0	3:1
3	Spain	3	2	1	6:4	3:1	0:3	x	3:0
4	Czech Republic	3	0	3	1:9	0:3	1:3	0:3	x

=== Competition bracket ===
Semi-finals
France	3
China	0
Slovakia	0
Belgium	3

Final
France	1
Belgium	3
Third place
China	2
Slovakia	3

== Team Lists ==
France; Alain Pichon; Michel Schaller; Julien Soyer	Slovakia; Richard Csejtey; Miroslav Mitas	South Africa; Pieter du Plooy; Johan du Plooy	Belgium; Nico Vergeylen; Mathieu Loicq; Marc Ledoux
China; Li Manzhou; Qin Xiao Jun	Spain; Jordi Morales; Alvaro Valera	Czech Republic; Milan Duracka; Jiri Soukup	
