= Slovenia at the 2004 Summer Paralympics =

- IPC code: SLO
- NPC: Sports Federation for the Disabled of Slovenia
- Website: www.zsis.si

in Athens
- Competitors: 28 in 7 sports
- Medals Ranked 49th: Gold 1 Silver 2 Bronze 1 Total 4

Summer Paralympics appearances (overview)
- 1992; 1996; 2000; 2004; 2008; 2012; 2016; 2020; 2024

Other related appearances
- Yugoslavia (1972–2000)

Slovenia competed at the 2004 Summer Paralympics in Athens, Greece. The team included 28 athletes, 14 men and 14 women. Competitors from Slovenia won 4 medals, including 1 gold, 2 silver and 1 bronze to finish 49th in the medal table.

== Medallists ==
Medal	Name	Sport	Event
Gold	Mateja Pintar	Table tennis	Women's individual Class 3
Silver	Tatjana Majcen	Athletics	Women's javelin throw F54/55
Silver	Franc Pinter	Shooting	Men's 10 m air rifle standing SH1
Bronze	Tatjana Majcen	Athletics	Women's shot put F54/55

== Sports ==
=== Athletics ===
==== Men's track ====
Athlete	Class	Event	Heats		Semifinal		Final	
Athlete	Class	Event	Result	Rank	Result	Rank	Result	Rank
Marko Sever	T54	1500 m	3:10.89	29	did not advance			
Marko Sever	T54	Marathon	—				1:43:41	20

==== Men's field ====
Athlete	Class	Event	Final		
Athlete	Class	Event	Result	Points	Rank
Janez Hudej	F54	Discus	23.31	—	6
Janez Hudej	F54	Shot put	8.77	—	4

==== Women's field ====
Athlete	Class	Event	Final		
Athlete	Class	Event	Result	Points	Rank
Tatjana Majcen	F54/55	Discus	14.78	979	4
Tatjana Majcen	F54/55	Javelin	12.37	960	2nd place, silver medalist(s)
Tatjana Majcen	F54/55	Shot put	6.00	986	3rd place, bronze medalist(s)

=== Goalball ===
The men's goalball team didn't win any medals; they were 11th out of 12 teams.

==== Players ====
- Gorazd Dolanc
- Matej Ledinek
- Zlatko Mihajlovič
- Dejan Pirc
- Ivan Vinkler
- Boštjan Vogrinčič

==== Tournament ====
Game	Match	Score	Rank
1	Slovenia vs. Spain (ESP)	1–4	6th
2	Slovenia vs. South Korea (KOR)	5–10	6th
3	Slovenia vs. Finland (FIN)	8–1	6th
4	Slovenia vs. Hungary (HUN)	1–4	6th
5	Slovenia vs. Lithuania (LTU)	4–7	6th
11/12th classification	Slovenia vs. Greece (GRE)	12–2	11th

=== Shooting ===
==== Men ====
Athlete	Event	Qualification		Final		
Athlete	Event	Score	Rank	Score	Total	Rank
Ernest Jazbinšek	Men's 10 m air pistol SH1	550	23	did not advance		
Srečko Majcenovič	Mixed 10 m air rifle prone SH2	595	18	did not advance		
Srečko Majcenovič	Mixed 10 m air rifle standing SH2	593	11	did not advance		
Damjan Pavlin	Mixed 10 m air rifle prone SH2	600 =WR	1 Q	103.6	703.6	6
Damjan Pavlin	Mixed 10 m air rifle standing SH2	599	2 Q	103.1	702.1	4
Franc Pinter	Men's 10 m air rifle standing SH1	591	2 Q	101.6	692.6	2nd place, silver medalist(s)
Franc Pinter	Men's 50 m rifle 3 positions SH1	1135	5 Q	93.7	1228.7	6
Franc Pinter	Mixed 10 m air rifle prone SH1	598	9	did not advance		
Franc Pinter	Mixed 50 m rifle prone SH1	574	25	did not advance		

=== Swimming ===
==== Men ====
Athlete	Class	Event	Heats		Final	
Athlete	Class	Event	Result	Rank	Result	Rank
Danijel Pavlinec	S6	50 m freestyle	33.87	9	did not advance	
Danijel Pavlinec	S6	100 m freestyle	1:14.83	10	did not advance	
Danijel Pavlinec	S6	400 m freestyle	5:39.91	6 Q	5:40.91	7

=== Table tennis ===
Athlete	Event	Preliminaries				Quarterfinals	Semifinals	Final / BM	
Athlete	Event	Opposition Result	Opposition Result	Opposition Result	Rank	Opposition Result	Opposition Result	Opposition Result	Rank
Andreja Dolinar	Women's singles 4	Zorzetto (ITA); L 1–3	Arenales (MEX); W 3–2	Johnson (USA); W 3–0	2 Q	Rast (SUI); L 1–3	did not advance		
Mateja Pintar	Women's singles 3	Fujiwara (JPN); W 3–0	Moll (RSA); W 3–0	—	1 Q	Bye	Gay (FRA); W 3–2	Mariage (FRA); W 3–1	1st place, gold medalist(s)
Andreja Dolinar; Mateja Pintar	Women's team 4-5	China (CHN); L 0–3	France (FRA); L 1–3	—	3	did not advance			

=== Volleyball ===
The women's volleyball team didn't win any medals; they were defeated by the United States in the bronze medal match.

==== Players ====
- Marinka Cencelj
- Anita Goltnik Urnaut
- Danica Gošnak
- Emilie Gradišek
- Bogomira Jakin
- Saša Kotnik
- Boža Kovačič
- Nadja Ovčjak
- Alenka Šart
- Tanja Simonič
- Štefka Tomič

==== Tournament ====
Game	Match	Score	Rank
1	Slovenia vs. China (CHN)	0–3	4th
2	Slovenia vs. Netherlands (NED)	0–3	4th
3	Slovenia vs. United States (USA)	2–3	4th
4	Slovenia vs. Finland (FIN)	3–1	4th
5	Slovenia vs. Ukraine (UKR)	3–0	4th
Semifinals	Slovenia vs. China (CHN)	0–3	L
Bronze medal match	Slovenia vs. United States (USA)	1–3	4th

== See also ==
- Slovenia at the Paralympics
- Slovenia at the 2004 Summer Olympics
