= Cycling at the 2004 Summer Paralympics – Men's road time trial =

The Men's time trial road cycling events at the 2004 Summer Paralympics were held at Vouliagmeni on 24 September.

There were three classes. Athletes with an impairment affecting their legs competed using a handcycle. Athletes with an impairment that affected their balance used a tricycle.

== HC A ==
Men's Handcycle Time Trial HC Div A at the XII Paralympic Games
- Paralympic Cycling (road)
- Venue: Vouliagmeni
- Dates: 27 September 2004
- Competitors: 6 from 5 nations

Medalists
1st place, gold medalist(s)		Christoph Etzlstorfer	Austria
2nd place, silver medalist(s)		Rastislav Turecek	Slovakia
3rd place, bronze medalist(s)		Franz Weber	Switzerland

The handcycle HC Div A event was won by Christoph Etzlstorfer, representing Austria.

=== Results ===
27 Sept. 2004, 09:00

Rank	Athlete	Time	Notes
1st place, gold medalist(s)	Christoph Etzlstorfer (AUT)	11:55.11	
2nd place, silver medalist(s)	Rastislav Turecek (SVK)	11:59.85	
3rd place, bronze medalist(s)	Franz Weber (SUI)	12:10.70	
4	Wolfgang Schattauer (AUT)	12:52.04	
5	Andreas Kiemes (GER)	13:37.73	
6	James Harlan (USA)	16:40.94	

== HC B/C ==
Men's Handcycle Time Trial HC Div B/C at the XII Paralympic Games
- Paralympic Cycling (road)
- Venue: Vouliagmeni
- Dates: 27 September 2004
- Competitors: 13 from 9 nations

Medalists
1st place, gold medalist(s)		Marcel Pipek	Czech Republic
2nd place, silver medalist(s)		Johann Mayrhofer	Austria
3rd place, bronze medalist(s)		Franz Nietlispach	Switzerland

The handcycle HC Div B/C event was won by Marcel Pipek, representing Czech Republic. As the event covered more than one disability class, the standings were ranked in order of a calculated time.

=== Results ===
27 Sept. 2004, 09:07

Rank	Athlete	Real Time	Factor	Time	Notes
1st place, gold medalist(s)	Marcel Pipek (CZE)	19:59.85	87.352	17:28.09	
2nd place, silver medalist(s)	Johann Mayrhofer (AUT)	18:16.42	100.000	18:16.42	
3rd place, bronze medalist(s)	Franz Nietlispach (SUI)	18:18.92	100.000	18:18.92	
4	Cefas Bouman (NED)	18:20.47	100.000	18:20.47	
5	Alejandro Albor (USA)	18:37.60	100.000	18:37.60	
6	Markus Rauber (SUI)	21:30.02	87.352	18:46.85	
7	Gregory Hockensmith (USA)	21:33.02	87.352	18:49.47	
8	Seth Arsenau (USA)	19:08.75	100.000	19:08.75	
9	Johan Reekers (NED)	19:31.32	100.000	19:31.32	
10	Roland Ruepp (ITA)	19:41.40	100.000	19:41.40	
11	Ziv Bar Shira (ISR)	20:28.97	100.000	20:28.97	
12	Mark Beggs (CAN)	24:12.37	87.352	21:08.67	
13	Florian Sitzmann (GER)	22:32.68	100.000	22:32.68	

== CP 1/2 ==
Men's Tricycle Time Trial CP Div 1/2 at the XII Paralympic Games
- Paralympic Cycling (road)
- Venue: Vouliagmeni
- Dates: 27 September 2004
- Competitors: 8 from 8 nations

Medalists
1st place, gold medalist(s)		Dirk Boon	Belgium
2nd place, silver medalist(s)		Mark le Flohic	Australia
3rd place, bronze medalist(s)		Adriaan Nel	South Africa

The tricycle CP Div 1/2 event was won by Dirk Boon, representing Belgium. As the event covered more than one disability class, the standings were ranked in order of a calculated time.

=== Results ===
27 Sept. 2004, 09:21

Rank	Athlete	Real Time	Factor	Time	Notes
1st place, gold medalist(s)	Dirk Boon (BEL)	11:06.14	77.758	8:37.97	
2nd place, silver medalist(s)	Mark le Flohic (AUS)	10:06.84	100.000	10:06.84	
3rd place, bronze medalist(s)	Adriaan Nel (RSA)	10:10.58	100.000	10:10.58	
4	Stuart Flacks (USA)	10:24.83	100.000	10:24.83	
5	Mutsuhiko Ogawa (JPN)	10:32.26	100.000	10:32.26	
6	Andreas Hillers (GER)	10:50.31	100.000	10:50.31	
7	Josef Winkler (CZE)	10:53.13	100.000	10:53.13	
8	Paul Jalbert (CAN)	12:19.86	100.000	12:19.86	
