= Table tennis at the 2004 Summer Paralympics – Men's team – Class 4 =

Table Tennis - Men's Teams 4 at the XII Paralympic Games
- Paralympic Table Tennis
- Venue: Galatsi Olympic Hall
- Dates: 23–27 September 2004
- Competitors: 7

Medalists
1st place, gold medalist(s)		Choi Kyoung Sik; Um Tae Hyung; Park Jun-young	South Korea
2nd place, silver medalist(s)		Sebastien Pechard; Emeric Martin; Bruno Benedetti	France
3rd place, bronze medalist(s)		Zhang Jie; Zhang Yan	China

The Men's Teams 4 table tennis competition at the 2004 Summer Paralympics was held from 23 to 27 September at the Galatsi Olympic Hall.

Classes 1-5 were for athletes with a physical impairment that affected their legs, who competed in a sitting position. The lower the number, the greater the impact the impairment was on an athlete's ability to compete.

The event was won by the team representing South Korea.

== Results ==
=== Preliminaries ===
Qualified for final round

==== Group A ====
Rank	Competitor	MP	W	L	Points	KOR	CHN	BRA
1	South Korea	2	2	0	6:2	x	3:2	3:0
2	China	2	1	1	5:4	2:3	x	3:1
3	Brazil	2	0	2	1:6	0:3	1:3	x

==== Group B ====
Rank	Competitor	MP	W	L	Points	FRA	GER	SUI	EGY
1	France	3	3	0	9:2	x	3:0	3:2	3:0
2	Germany	3	2	1	6:5	0:3	x	3:0	3:2
3	Switzerland	3	1	2	5:7	2:3	0:3	x	3:1
4	Egypt	3	0	3	3:9	0:3	2:3	1:3	x

=== Competition bracket ===
Semi-finals
South Korea	3
Germany	0
China	0
France	3

Final
South Korea	3
France	2
Third place
Germany	1
China	3

== Team Lists ==
South Korea; Choi Kyoung Sik; Um Tae Hyung; Park Jun-young	China; Zhang Jie; Zhang Yan	Brazil; Ivanildo Freitas; Luiz da Silva	France; Sebastien Pechard; Emeric Martin; Bruno Benedetti
Germany; Werner Burkhardt; Dietmar Kober	Switzerland; Christian Sutter; Rolf Zumkehr	Egypt; Ali Mohamed Nars; Sameh Mohammad Eid	
