= Slovakia at the 2004 Summer Paralympics =

- IPC code: SVK
- NPC: Slovak Paralympic Committee
- Website: www.spv.sk

in Athens
- Competitors: 37 in 10 sports
- Medals Ranked 30th: Gold 5 Silver 3 Bronze 4 Total 12

Summer Paralympics appearances (overview)
- 1996; 2000; 2004; 2008; 2012; 2016; 2020; 2024

Other related appearances
- Czechoslovakia (1972–1992)

Slovakia competed at the 2004 Summer Paralympics in Athens, Greece. The team included 37 athletes, 29 men and 8 women. Competitors from Slovakia won 12 medals, including 5 gold, 3 silver and 4 bronze to finish 30th in the medal table.

== Medallists ==
Medal	Name	Sport	Event
Gold	Imrich Lyocsa	Archery	Men's individual standing
Gold	Marek Margoc	Athletics	Men's shot put F40
Gold	Rastislav Turecek	Cycling	Men's handcycle road race HC A
Gold	Jan Riapos	Table tennis	Men's singles class 2
Gold	Ladislav Gaspar	Table tennis	Men's singles class 10
Silver	Rastislav Turecek	Cycling	Men's handcycle time trial HC A
Silver	Viera Mikulasikova	Swimming	Women's 50m freestyle S10
Silver	Rastislav Revucky; Jan Riapos	Table tennis	Men's teams class 1-2
Bronze	Julius Hutka	Athletics	Men's shot put F57
Bronze	Richard Csejtey	Table tennis	Men's singles class 8
Bronze	Richard Csejtey; Miroslav Mitas	Table tennis	Men's teams class 8
Bronze	Alena Kanova	Table tennis	Women's singles class 3

== Sports ==
=== Archery ===
==== Men ====
Athlete	Event	Ranking round		Round of 32	Round of 16	Quarterfinals	Semifinals	Finals	
Athlete	Event	Score	Seed	Opposition score	Opposition score	Opposition score	Opposition score	Opposition score	Rank
Miroslav Kacina	Men's individual W2	547	30	N/A	Oehme (GER); L 135-159	did not advance			
Jaroslav Lazo	Men's individual standing	573	18	N/A	Rad (IRI); L 127-137	did not advance			
Imrich Lyocsa	Men's individual standing	611	3	N/A	Martinez (VEN); W 147-134	Atamanenko (UKR); W 95-86	An (KOR); W 104-92	Lezanski (POL); W *103-103	1st place, gold medalist(s)
Vladimir Majercak	Men's individual standing	606	7	N/A		An (KOR); L 143-152	did not advance		
Jaroslav Lazo; Imrich Lyocsa; Vladimir Majercak	Men's team	1790	8	N/A	Spain (ESP); W *209-209	South Korea (KOR); L 213-217	did not advance		

- Imrich Lyocsa's gold medal match against Poland's Tomasz Lezanski was decided by additional arrows. Lyocsa won 8 arrows to 5 and won the gold medal.
- The men's team round of 16 match against Spain was decided by additional arrows. They won 26 arrows to 18 and progressed to the quarterfinals.

=== Athletics ===
==== Men's track ====
Athlete	Class	Event	Heats		Semifinal		Final	
Athlete	Class	Event	Result	Rank	Result	Rank	Result	Rank
Jozef Ambroz	T11	Marathon	N/A				2:50:38	8
Anton Sluka	T11	Marathon	N/A				DNF	

==== Men's field ====
Athlete	Class	Event	Final		
Athlete	Class	Event	Result	Points	Rank
Norbert Holík	P13	Pentathlon	2195		6
Julius Hutka	F57	Javelin	37.61	-	4
Julius Hutka	F57	Shot put	12.30	-	3rd place, bronze medalist(s)
Marek Margoc	F40	Shot put	10.13	-	1st place, gold medalist(s)

=== Boccia ===
Athlete	Event	Preliminaries			Semifinals	Final	
Athlete	Event	Opponent	Opposition Score	Rank	Opposition Score	Opposition Score	Rank
Robert Durkovic	Mixed individual BC4	Leung (HKG)	L 2-8	3	did not advance		
Robert Durkovic	Mixed individual BC4	Streharsky (SVK)	L 8-9	3	did not advance		
Robert Durkovic	Mixed individual BC4	Lau (HKG)	W 7-6	3	did not advance		
Robert Durkovic	Mixed individual BC4	Gauthier (CAN)	W 5-2	3	did not advance		
Martin Streharsky	Mixed individual BC4	Leung (HKG)	L 3-5	2 Q	Valentim (POR); L 2-6	Dueso (ESP); L 2-6	4
Martin Streharsky	Mixed individual BC4	Durkovic (SVK)	W 9-8	2 Q	Valentim (POR); L 2-6	Dueso (ESP); L 2-6	4
Martin Streharsky	Mixed individual BC4	Lau (HKG)	W 6-1	2 Q	Valentim (POR); L 2-6	Dueso (ESP); L 2-6	4
Martin Streharsky	Mixed individual BC4	Gauthier (CAN)	W 10-0	2 Q	Valentim (POR); L 2-6	Dueso (ESP); L 2-6	4
Robert Durkovic; Martin Streharsky	Mixed pairs BC4	Lau (HKG); Leung (HKG)	L 1-6	N/A			4
Robert Durkovic; Martin Streharsky	Mixed pairs BC4	de Oliveira Pereira (POR); Valentim (POR)	L 2-8	N/A			4
Robert Durkovic; Martin Streharsky	Mixed pairs BC4	Beres (HUN); Gyurkota (HUN)	W 4-3	N/A			4
Robert Durkovic; Martin Streharsky	Mixed pairs BC4	Gomez (ESP); Dueso (ESP)	W 5-2	N/A			4
Robert Durkovic; Martin Streharsky	Mixed pairs BC4	Gauthier (CAN); Vandervies (CAN)	W 5-2	N/A			4

=== Cycling ===
==== Men's road ====
Athlete	Event	Time	Rank
Roman Marcek	Men's road race / time trial LC1	-	12
Rastislav Turecek	Men's handcycle road race HC div A	1:05.48	1st place, gold medalist(s)
Rastislav Turecek	Men's handcycle time trial HC div A	11:59.85	2nd place, silver medalist(s)

==== Men's track (individual) ====
Athlete	Event	Qualification		1st round		Final	
Athlete	Event	Time	Rank	Time	Rank	Opposition Time	Rank
Roman Marcek	Men's 1km time trial LC1-4	N/A				1:16.02	23
Roman Marcek	Men's individual pursuit LC1	5:19.35	10	did not advance			

==== Men's track (tandem) ====
Athlete	Event	Ranking round		Quarterfinals		Semifinals		Final	
Athlete	Event	Time	Rank	Time	Rank	Time	Rank	Opposition Time	Rank
Vladislav Janovjak; Juraj Petrovic (pilot)	Men's 1km time trial tandem B1-3	N/A						1:08.90	13
Vladislav Janovjak; Juraj Petrovic (pilot)	Men's sprint tandem B1-3	10.958	3 Q	Moll (GER) / Goliasch (GER); 2-0	W	Biddle (AUS) / Stewart (AUS); 2-1	W	Modra (AUS) / Short (AUS); DSQ	-

- Vladislav Janovjak and Juraj Petrovic were stripped of their silver medals after Petrovic was tested positive for banned substances. The silver medals were awarded to Japan's Shigeo Yoshihara and Takuya Oki.

=== Powerlifting ===
==== Men ====
Athlete	Event	Result	Rank
Peter Stefanides	90kg	142.5	14

==== Women ====
Athlete	Event	Result	Rank
Maria Bartosova	56kg	77.5	8
Anna Oroszova	48kg	75.0	6

=== Shooting ===
==== Men ====
Athlete	Event	Qualification		Final		
Athlete	Event	Score	Rank	Score	Total	Rank
Jozef Siroky	Men's 50m rifle 3 positions SH1	1103	19	did not advance		
Jozef Siroky	Mixed 10m air rifle prone SH1	593	38	did not advance		
Jozef Siroky	Mixed 50m rifle prone SH1	582	13	did not advance		
Pavel Zachensky	Mixed 25m pistol SH1	546	15	did not advance		

==== Women ====
Athlete	Event	Qualification		Final		
Athlete	Event	Score	Rank	Score	Total	Rank
Veronika Vadovicová	Mixed 10m air rifle prone SH1	597	14	did not advance		
Veronika Vadovicová	Mixed 50m rifle prone SH1	581	15	did not advance		
Veronika Vadovicová	Women's 10m air rifle standing SH1	383	8 Q	97.1	480.1	8
Veronika Vadovicová	Women's 50m rifle 3 positions SH1	554	6 Q	91.1	645.1	6

=== Swimming ===
==== Men ====
Athlete	Class	Event	Heats		Final	
Athlete	Class	Event	Result	Rank	Result	Rank
Silvester Skuliba	S8	100m butterfly	1:23.40	12	did not advance	
Andrej Zatko	SB2	50m breaststroke	1:06.85	5 Q	1:06.38	4
Andrej Zatko	SM3	150m individual medley	4:06.11	9	did not advance	

==== Women ====
Athlete	Class	Event	Heats		Final	
Athlete	Class	Event	Result	Rank	Result	Rank
Viera Mikulasikova	S10	50m freestyle	30.16	2 Q	29.68	2nd place, silver medalist(s)
Viera Mikulasikova	S10	100m freestyle	1:06.57	5 Q	1:06.20	5
Viera Mikulasikova	S10	400m freestyle	5:13.29	6 Q	5:14.33	7
Viera Mikulasikova	SB9	100m breaststroke	DSQ		did not advance	
Margita Prokeinova	S7	50m freestyle	37.19	8 Q	36.83	7
Margita Prokeinova	S7	100m freestyle	1:28.55	14	did not advance	
Margita Prokeinova	S7	100m backstroke	1:41.49	9	did not advance	
Margita Prokeinova	S7	50m butterfly	41.18	7 Q	39.97	7
Margita Prokeinova	SM7	200m individual medley	3:28.15	6 Q	3:19.89	5

=== Table tennis ===
==== Men ====
Athlete	Event	Preliminaries				Round of 16	Quarterfinals	Semifinals	Final / BM	
Athlete	Event	Opposition Result	Opposition Result	Opposition Result	Rank	Opposition Result	Opposition Result	Opposition Result	Opposition Result	Rank
Richard Csejtey	Men's singles 8	Loicq (BEL); W 3-0	Lee (KOR); W 3-1	Kovacic (CRO); W 3-0	1 Q	Bye	Vergeylen (BEL); W 3-0	Ledoux (BEL); L 1-3	Frommelt (LIE); W 3-0	3rd place, bronze medalist(s)
Ladislav Gaspar	Men's singles 10	Andersson (SWE); W 3-1	Puglisi (ITA); W 3-0	Bereczki (HUN); W 3-0	1 Q	N/A	Vrbka (CZE); W 3-0	Ge (CHN); W 3-0	Andersson (SWE); W 3-1	1st place, gold medalist(s)
Jan Kosco	Men's singles 3	Dollmann (AUT); L 0-3	Rawson (GBR); W 3-2	Scheuvens (GER); W 3-0	2 Q	Trofan (GBR); W 3-1	Kim (KOR); L 1-3	did not advance		
Miroslav Mitas	Men's singles 8	Glikman (ISR); L 0-3	Schaller (FRA); L 0-3	Skrzynecki (POL); L 2-3	4	did not advance				
Rastislav Revucky	Men's singles 2	Kim (KOR); L 1-3	Reup (AUT); W 3-0	Gruenkemeyer (GER); W 3-0	2 Q	N/A	Molliens (FRA); W 3-1	Riapos (SVK); L 2-3	Kim (KOR); L 1-3	4
Jan Riapos	Men's singles 2	Sorabella (FRA); W 3–1	Vilsmaier (GER); L 2–3	Espindola (BRA); W 3–2	2 Q	N/A	Boury (FRA); W 3–1	Revucky (SVK); W 3-2	Kim (KOR); W 3-1	1st place, gold medalist(s)
Peter Valka	Men's singles 3	Piñas (ESP); L 0-3	Kylevik (SWE); L 1-3	Wu (TPE); L 1-3	4	did not advance				

==== Women ====
Athlete	Event	Preliminaries				Quarterfinals	Semifinals	Final / BM	
Athlete	Event	Opposition Result	Opposition Result	Opposition Result	Rank	Opposition Result	Opposition Result	Opposition Result	Rank
Olga Barbušová	Women's singles 6-8	Xiaoling (CHN); L 1-3	Glinska (POL); W 3-2	—N/a	2 Q	Bengtsson Kovacs (SWE); L 3-0	did not advance		
Alena Kanova	Women's singles 3	Gay (FRA); W 3–1	Bartheidel (GER); W 3–0	—N/a	1 Q	Bye	Mariage (FRA); L 2–3	Gay (FRA); W 3-0	3rd place, bronze medalist(s)
Maria Pillarova	Women's singles 4	Pape (GER); L 0-3	Rast (SUI); W 3-2	Riese (RSA); W 3-0	3	did not advance			

==== Teams ====
Athlete	Event	Preliminaries				Quarterfinals	Semifinals	Final / BM	
Athlete	Event	Opposition Result	Opposition Result	Opposition Result	Rank	Opposition Result	Opposition Result	Opposition Result	Rank
Rastislav Revucky; Jan Riapos	Men's teams 1-2	South Korea (KOR); L 2–3	Finland (FIN); W 3–0	Argentina (ARG); W 3–0	2 Q	N/A	France (FRA); W 3–1	South Korea (KOR); L 1-3	2nd place, silver medalist(s)
Jan Kosco; Peter Valka	Men's teams 3	France (FRA); L 0-3	South Korea (KOR); L 0-3	Spain (ESP); L 2-3	4	did not advance			
Richard Csejtey; Miroslav Mitas	Men's teams 8	France (FRA); L 0-3	South Africa (RSA); W 3-0	N/A	2 Q	N/A	Belgium (BEL); L 0-3	China (CHN); W 3-2	3rd place, bronze medalist(s)
Alena Kanova; Maria Pillarova	Women's teams 4-5	Mexico (MEX); W 3-1	Italy (ITA); W 3-1	N/A	1 Q	Jordan (JOR); L 2-3	did not advance		

=== Wheelchair tennis ===
==== Men ====
Athlete	Class	Event	Round of 64	Round of 32	Round of 16	Quarterfinals	Semifinals	Finals
Athlete	Class	Event	Opposition Result	Opposition Result	Opposition Result	Opposition Result	Opposition Result	Opposition Result
David Chabrecek	Open	Men's singles	Gardner (GBR); L 3–6, 3–6	did not advance				

== See also ==
- Slovakia at the Paralympics
- Slovakia at the 2004 Summer Olympics
