= Cycling at the 2004 Summer Paralympics – Men's road race =

The Men's road race cycling events at the 2004 Summer Paralympics were held at Vouliagmeni on 24 September.

There were three classes. Athletes with an impairment affecting their legs competed using a handcycle. Athletes with an impairment that affected their balance used a tricycle.

== HC A ==
Men's Handcycle Road Race, HC Div A at the XII Paralympic Games
- Paralympic Cycling (road)
- Venue: Vouliagmeni
- Dates: 26 September 2004
- Competitors: 6 from 5 nations

Medalists
1st place, gold medalist(s)		Rastislav Turecek	Slovakia
2nd place, silver medalist(s)		Franz Weber	Switzerland
3rd place, bronze medalist(s)		Christoph Etzlstorfer	Austria

The handcycle HC Div A event was won by Rastislav Turecek, representing Slovakia.

=== Results ===
24 Sept. 2004, 10:00

Rank	Athlete	Time	Notes
1st place, gold medalist(s)	Rastislav Turecek (SVK)	1:05:48	
2nd place, silver medalist(s)	Franz Weber (SUI)	1:05:49	
3rd place, bronze medalist(s)	Christoph Etzlstorfer (AUT)	1:10:40	
4	Andreas Kiemes (GER)	1:13:42	
5	Wolfgang Schattauer (AUT)	1:13:51	
	James Harlan (USA)	DNF	

== HC B/C ==
Men's Handcycle Road Race HC Div B/C at the XII Paralympic Games
- Paralympic Cycling (road)
- Venue: Vouliagmeni
- Dates: 26 September 2004
- Competitors: 13 from 9 nations

Medalists
1st place, gold medalist(s)		Johann Mayrhofer	Austria
2nd place, silver medalist(s)		Alejandro Albor	United States
3rd place, bronze medalist(s)		Johan Reekers	Netherlands

The handcycle Div B/C event was won by Johann Mayrhofer, representing Austria.

=== Results ===
24 Sept. 2004, 10:00

Rank	Athlete	Time	Notes
1st place, gold medalist(s)	Johann Mayrhofer (AUT)	1:17:29	
2nd place, silver medalist(s)	Alejandro Albor (USA)	1:17:29	
3rd place, bronze medalist(s)	Johan Reekers (NED)	1:17:30	
4	Cefas Bouman (NED)	1:17:30	
5	Franz Nietlispach (SUI)	1:24:51	
6	Marcel Pipek (CZE)	1:25:40	
7	Seth Arsenau (USA)	1:27:29	
8	Roland Ruepp (ITA)	1:27:31	
9	Ziv Bar Shira (ISR)	1:27:32	
10	Markus Rauber (SUI)	OVL	
11	Mark Beggs (CAN)	OVL	
	Florian Sitzmann (GER)	DNF	
	Gregory Hockensmith (USA)	DNS	

== CP 1/2 ==
Men's Tricycle Road Race CP Div 1/2 at the XII Paralympic Games
- Paralympic Cycling (road)
- Venue: Vouliagmeni
- Dates: 26 September 2004
- Competitors: 8 from 8 nations

Medalists
1st place, gold medalist(s)		Mark le Flohic	Australia
2nd place, silver medalist(s)		Stuart Flacks	United States
3rd place, bronze medalist(s)		Mutsuhiko Ogawa	Japan

The tricycle CP Div 1/2 event was won by Mark le Flohic, representing Australia.

=== Results ===
24 Sept. 2004, 14:20

Rank	Athlete	Time	Notes
1st place, gold medalist(s)	Mark le Flohic (AUS)	46:53	
2nd place, silver medalist(s)	Stuart Flacks (USA)	47:28	
3rd place, bronze medalist(s)	Mutsuhiko Ogawa (JPN)	48:14	
4	Josef Winkler (CZE)	49:21	
5	Dirk Boon (BEL)	50:26	
6	Andreas Hillers (GER)	53:05	
7	Paul Jalbert (CAN)	57:50	
	Adriaan Nel (RSA)	DNF	
