= South Korea at the 2004 Summer Paralympics =

- IPC code: KOR
- NPC: Korean Paralympic Committee
- Website: www.kosad.or.kr (in Korean)

in Athens
- Competitors: 80 in 12 sports
- Medals Ranked 16th: Gold 11 Silver 11 Bronze 6 Total 28

Summer Paralympics appearances (overview)
- 1968; 1972; 1976; 1980; 1984; 1988; 1992; 1996; 2000; 2004; 2008; 2012; 2016; 2020; 2024

South Korea competed at the 2004 Summer Paralympics in Athens, Greece. The team included 82 athletes, 72 men and 10 women. Competitors from Korea won 28 medals, including 11 gold, 11 silver and 6 bronze to finish 16th in the medal table.

== Medallists ==
Medal	Name	Sport	Event
Gold	Young Joo Jung; Hak Young Lee; Hong Gu Lee	Archery	Men's team open
Gold	Suk Man Hong	Athletics	Men's 100m T53
Gold	Suk Man Hong	Athletics	Men's 200m T53
Gold	Myung Hoon An; Seong Hyeon Park	Boccia	Mixed pairs BC3
Gold	Jong Chul Park	Powerlifting	Men's 90 kg
Gold	Myung Sook Her	Shooting	Women's sport rifle 3x20 SH1
Gold	Young Gun Kim	Table tennis	Men's singles class 3
Gold	Byoung Young Kim	Table tennis	Men's singles class 5
Gold	Seong Hoon Kang; Gong Yong Kim; Kyung Mook Kim; Hae Gon Lee	Table tennis	Men's teams class 1-2
Gold	Young Gun Kim; Heung Sik Yang; Jae Kwan Cho	Table tennis	Men's teams class 3
Gold	Kyoung Sik Choi; Tae Hyung Um; Park Jun-young	Table tennis	Men's teams class 4
Silver	Young Joo Jung	Archery	Men's individual W2
Silver	Suk Man Hong	Athletics	Men's 400m T53
Silver	Keum Jong Jung	Powerlifting	Men's 60 kg
Silver	Myung Sook Her	Shooting	Women's air rifle standing SH1
Silver	Im Yeon Kim	Shooting	Women's sport rifle 3x20 SH1
Silver	Jae Yong Sim	Shooting	Mixed air rifle prone SH1
Silver	Ho Gyoung You	Shooting	Mixed air rifle prone SH2
Silver	Hae Gon Lee	Table tennis	Men's singles class 1
Silver	Gong Yong Kim	Table tennis	Men's singles class 2
Silver	Eun Chang Jung	Table tennis	Men's singles class 5
Silver	Eun Chang Jung; Byoung Young Kim	Table tennis	Men's team class 5
Bronze	Hong Gu Lee	Archery	Men's individual W2
Bronze	Tae Sung An	Archery	Men's individual standing
Bronze	Hee Sook Ko; Hwa Sook Lee; Kyung Hee Lee	Archery	Women's team open
Bronze	Myung Hoon An	Boccia	Mixed individual BC3
Bronze	Kyung Mook Kim	Table tennis	Men's singles class 2
Bronze	Kyoung Sik Choi	Table tennis	Men's singles class 4

== Sports ==
=== Archery ===
==== Men ====
Athlete	Event	Ranking round		Round of 32	Round of 16	Quarterfinals	Semifinals	Finals	
Athlete	Event	Score	Seed	Opposition score	Opposition score	Opposition score	Opposition score	Opposition score	Rank
An Tae Sung	Men's individual standing	603	10	Bye	Majercak (SVK); W 152-143	Rad (IRI); W 102-76	Lyocsa (SVK); L 92-104	Zhu (CHN); W 108-99	3rd place, bronze medalist(s)
Cho Hyu Kwan	Men's individual standing	609	5	Bye	Zarzuela (ESP); L 142-144	Did not advance			
Lee Hak Young	Men's individual standing	638 WR	1	Bye	Zhu (CHN); L 154-155	Did not advance			
Jung Young Joo	Men's individual W2	619	5	Zin (MAS); W 159-137	Gregory (GBR); W 161-149	Tseng (TPE); W 92-87	Lee (KOR); W 109-95	Oehme (GER); L 95-108	2nd place, silver medalist(s)
Lee Hong Gu	Men's individual W2	628	1	Bye	Stone (USA); W 162-152	Zhang (CHN); W 97-92	Jung (KOR); L 95-109	de Pellegrin (ITA); W 104-96	3rd place, bronze medalist(s)
Lee Ouk Soo	Men's individual W2	617	7	Baet Tellez (MEX); W 157-146	Baylis (GBR); W 146-141	de Pellegrin (ITA); L 91-94	Did not advance		
Jung Young Joo; Lee Hak Young; Lee Hong Gu	Men's team open	1885 WR	1	N/A		Slovakia (SVK); W 217-213	Great Britain (GBR); W 236-231	Japan (JPN); W 236-223	1st place, gold medalist(s)

==== Women ====
Athlete	Event	Ranking round		Round of 32	Round of 16	Quarterfinals	Semifinals	Finals	
Athlete	Event	Score	Seed	Opposition score	Opposition score	Opposition score	Opposition score	Opposition score	Rank
Ko Hee Sook	Women's individual W1/W2	601	2	N/A	Giagkoulla (CYP); W 156-99	Terletska (UKR); W 98-92	Isozaki (JPN); L 89-91	Hirasawa (JPN); L 99-90	4
Lee Hwa Sook	Women's individual standing	577	4	N/A	Struk (UKR); W 136-127	Karpmaichan (THA); L 78-88	Did not advance		
Lee Kyung Hee	Women's individual standing	552	6	N/A	Yonezawa (JPN); L 126-134	Did not advance			
Ko Hee Sook; Lee Hwa Sook; Lee Kyung Hee	Women's team open	1730	2	N/A		Ukraine (UKR); W 201-198	Italy (ITA); L 194-205	Japan (JPN); W 213-201	3rd place, bronze medalist(s)

=== Athletics ===
==== Men's track ====
Athlete	Class	Event	Heats		Semifinal		Final	
Athlete	Class	Event	Result	Rank	Result	Rank	Result	Rank
Choi Yong Jin	T36	400m	1:04.45	9	Did not advance			
Choi Yong Jin	T36	1500m	N/A				4:50.98	4
Choi Yong Jin	T37	800m	2:35.54	12	Did not advance			
Hong Duk Ho	T53	100m	15.95	10	Did not advance			
Hong Duk Ho	T53	200m	28.84	19	Did not advance			
Hong Suk Man	T53	100m	15.11 PR	1 Q	N/A		15.04 PR	1st place, gold medalist(s)
Hong Suk Man	T53	200m	26.48 WR	1 Q	N/A		26.31 WR	1st place, gold medalist(s)
Hong Suk Man	T53	400m	N/A					2nd place, silver medalist(s)
Kang Sung Kook	T37	400m	N/A				1:00.61	8
Kang Sung Kook	T37	800m	2:22.57	8 q	N/A		2:21.31	8
Kang Sung Kook	T37	1500m	N/A				5:03.80	10
Kim Young Min	T38	100m	13.07	10	Did not advance			
Kim Young Min	T38	200m	27.84	10	Did not advance			

==== Men's field ====
Athlete	Class	Event	Final		
Athlete	Class	Event	Result	Points	Rank
Han Do Hyung	F37	Javelin	36.71	-	7
Han Sung Hyun	F11	Javelin	22.64	-	10
Kim Dae Kwan	F36	Discus	29.97	-	5
Kim Dae Kwan	F36	Shot put	10.88	-	4
Park Se Ho	F32	Shot put	5.97	-	6
Park Se Ho	F32/51	Club throw	25.67	868	8

=== Boccia ===
Athlete	Event	Preliminaries			Quarterfinals	Semifinals	Final	
Athlete	Event	Opponent	Opposition Score	Rank	Opposition Score	Opposition Score	Opposition Score	Rank
An Myung Hoon	Mixed individual BC3	Costa (POR)	L 5-6	2 Q	Hanson (USA); W 11-2	Gauthier (CAN); L 1-3	Costa (POR); W 7-4	3rd place, bronze medalist(s)
An Myung Hoon	Mixed individual BC3	Dijkstra (NZL)	W 11-2	2 Q	Hanson (USA); W 11-2	Gauthier (CAN); L 1-3	Costa (POR); W 7-4	3rd place, bronze medalist(s)
An Myung Hoon	Mixed individual BC3	Martin (ESP)	L 2-4	2 Q	Hanson (USA); W 11-2	Gauthier (CAN); L 1-3	Costa (POR); W 7-4	3rd place, bronze medalist(s)
An Myung Hoon	Mixed individual BC3	Williams (USA)	W 11-1	2 Q	Hanson (USA); W 11-2	Gauthier (CAN); L 1-3	Costa (POR); W 7-4	3rd place, bronze medalist(s)
Park Seong Hyeon	Mixed individual BC3	Gauthier (CAN)	L 3-6	4	Did not advance			
Park Seong Hyeon	Mixed individual BC3	Rodriguez (ESP)	W 8-4	4	Did not advance			
Park Seong Hyeon	Mixed individual BC3	Jackson (NZL)	L 3-6	4	Did not advance			
An Myung Hoon; Park Seong Hyeon	Mixed pairs BC3	Gauthier (CAN) / Kabush (CAN)	W 7-1	1 Q	N/A	Dijkstra (NZL) / Jackson (NZL); W 13-0	Pesquera (ESP) / Rodriguez (ESP); W 4-1	1st place, gold medalist(s)
An Myung Hoon; Park Seong Hyeon	Mixed pairs BC3	Macedo (POR) / Costa (POR)	W 11-2	1 Q	N/A	Dijkstra (NZL) / Jackson (NZL); W 13-0	Pesquera (ESP) / Rodriguez (ESP); W 4-1	1st place, gold medalist(s)
An Myung Hoon; Park Seong Hyeon	Mixed pairs BC3	Hanson (USA) / Williams (USA)	W 11-1	1 Q	N/A	Dijkstra (NZL) / Jackson (NZL); W 13-0	Pesquera (ESP) / Rodriguez (ESP); W 4-1	1st place, gold medalist(s)

=== Football 5-a-side ===
The men's football 5-a-side team didn't win any medals. They were 6th out of 6 teams.

==== Players ====
- Bae Gwang Yong
- Kim Kyoung Ho
- Lee Dae Won
- Lee Heung Joo
- Lee Jin Won
- Lee Ok Hyeong
- Oh Young Kyun
- Park Meong Su
- Yoong Jong Suk
- You Myoung Goo

==== Tournament ====
Game	Match	Score	Rank
1	South Korea vs. Brazil (BRA)	0 - 4	6
2	South Korea vs. Argentina (ARG)	0 - 3	6
3	South Korea vs. Spain (ESP)	0 - 3	6
4	South Korea vs. Greece (GRE)	1 - 3	6
5	South Korea vs. France (FRA)	1 - 2	6
5th-6th classification	South Korea vs. France (FRA)	1 - 3	6

=== Goalball ===
The men's goalball team didn't win any medals. They were 8th out of 8 teams.

==== Players ====
- Hong Jang Hyun
- Kim Chul Hwan
- Lee Sun Haeng
- Lee Yoon Bong
- Oh Jeong Hwan
- Won Pong Pil

==== Tournament ====
Game	Match	Score	Rank
1	South Korea vs. Spain (ESP)	8 - 9	2 Q
2	South Korea vs. Finland (FIN)	0 - 10	2 Q
3	South Korea vs. Hungary (HUN)	7 - 5	2 Q
4	South Korea vs. Lithuania (LTU)	10 - 5	2 Q
5	South Korea vs. Slovenia (SLO)	10 - 5	2 Q
Quarterfinals	South Korea vs. Canada (CAN)	4 - 9	L
Semifinals	South Korea vs. Finland (FIN)	3 - 5	L
7th-8th classification	South Korea vs. Hungary (HUN)	3 - 8	8

=== Judo ===
Athlete	Event	Preliminary	Quarterfinals	Semifinals	Repechage round 1	Repechage round 2	Final/ Bronze medal contest
Athlete	Event	Opposition Result	Opposition Result	Opposition Result	Opposition Result	Opposition Result	Opposition Result
Lee Jong Dae	Men's 66kg	Karpenyuk (UKR); W 1000-0102H	Garcia del Valle (ESP); L 0010K–0200C	N/A	Soutios (GRE); W ?-?	Xu (CHN); L 0031-0000	Did not advance
Park Jung Min	Men's 90kg	Dinato (BRA); W 1000-0000	Fernández (ESP); W 1002-0000S	Kretsul (RUS); L 0000-1010	N/A		Stoskus (LTU); L 0010C-0011C

=== Powerlifting ===
==== Men ====
Athlete	Event	Result	Rank
Bong Duk Hwan	75kg	187.5	8
Cho Su Nam	48kg	125.0	10
Jung Keum Jong	60kg	195.0	2nd place, silver medalist(s)
Park Jong Chul	90kg	240.0 PR	1st place, gold medalist(s)
Park Kwang Hyuk	82.5kg	190.0	6
Sin Dae Heon	67.5kg	157.5	7
Song Nam Kyou	52kg	127.5	11
Yoon Sang Jin	56kg	NMR	

==== Women ====
Athlete	Event	Result	Rank
Shin Jung Hee	44kg	60.0	8

=== Shooting ===
==== Men ====
Athlete	Event	Qualification		Final		
Athlete	Event	Score	Rank	Score	Total	Rank
Choi Jong In	Men's 10m air pistol SH1	554	14	Did not advance		
Choi Jong In	Mixed 50m pistol SH1	511	17	Did not advance		
Han Tae Ho	Men's 50m rifle three positions	1123	12	Did not advance		
Han Tae Ho	Mixed 10m air rifle prone SH1	596	22	Did not advance		
Ho Gyoung You	Mixed 10m air rifle prone SH2	600 =WR	1 Q	105.3	705.3	2nd place, silver medalist(s)
Ho Gyoung You	Mixed 10m air rifle standing SH2	597	8 Q	103.4	700.4	7
Jung Jin Owan	Men's 10m air rifle standing SH1	588	5 Q	103.8	691.8	4
Jung Jin Owan	Men's 50m rifle three positions	1127	9	Did not advance		
Jung Jin Owan	Mixed 10m air rifle prone SH1	596	22	Did not advance		
Lee Hee Jeong	Men's 10m air pistol SH1	561	6 Q	96.6	657.6	5
Pyun Moo Jo	Men's 10m air rifle standing SH1	588	7 Q	102.7	690.7	5
Pyun Moo Jo	Men's 50m rifle three positions	1142	4 Q	99.3	1241.3	4
Sim Jae Yong	Men's 10m air rifle standing SH1	585	9	Did not advance		
Sim Jae Yong	Men's 50m rifle prone SH1	584	11	Did not advance		
Sim Jae Yong	Mixed 10m air rifle prone SH1	600 =WR	1 Q	104.3	704.3	2nd place, silver medalist(s)

==== Women ====
Athlete	Event	Qualification		Final		
Athlete	Event	Score	Rank	Score	Total	Rank
Bae Young Ee	Women's 10m air pistol SH1	360	9	Did not advance		
Her Myung Sook	Women's 10m air rifle standing SH1	389	2 Q	100.3	489.3	2nd place, silver medalist(s)
Her Myung Sook	Women's 50m rifle three positions SH1	564	1 Q	97.6	661.6 WR	1st place, gold medalist(s)
Kim Im Yeon	Mixed 50m rifle prone SH1	584	11	Did not advance		
Kim Im Yeon	Women's 10m air rifle standing SH1	388	3 Q	97.4	485.4	6
Kim Im Yeon	Women's 50m rifle three positions SH1	562	2 Q	95.2	657.2	2nd place, silver medalist(s)
Yoo Eun Joo	Women's 10m air pistol SH1	357	11	Did not advance		

=== Swimming ===
==== Men ====
Athlete	Class	Event	Heats		Final	
Athlete	Class	Event	Result	Rank	Result	Rank
Back Min Jun	S5	100m freestyle	1:41.14	11	Did not advance	
Back Min Jun	S5	200m freestyle	3:40.29	8 Q	3:40.91	8
Back Min Jun	S5	50m butterfly	51.44	9	Did not advance	
Back Min Jun	SB4	100m breaststroke	1:58.92	6 Q	1:59.73	7
Lee Hyung Yong	SB3	50m breaststroke	1:00.91	9	Did not advance	
Lee Hyung Yong	SM3	150m individual medley	3:37.66	7 Q	3:33.46	6
Lee Sun Wook	S6	400m freestyle	6:31.97	15	Did not advance	
Park Jong Man	SB4	100m breaststroke	2:01.82	9	Did not advance	
Park Jong Man	SM5	200m individual medley	DSQ		Did not advance	

=== Table tennis ===
==== Singles ====
Athlete	Event	Preliminaries				Round of 16	Quarterfinals	Semifinals	Final / BM	
Athlete	Event	Opposition Result	Opposition Result	Opposition Result	Rank	Opposition Result	Opposition Result	Opposition Result	Opposition Result	Rank
Cho Jae Kwan	Men's singles 1	Kilger (GER); L 2-3	Haylan (ARG); W 3-1	Fouillen (FRA); L 2-3	3	Did not advance				
Choi Kyoung Sik	Men's singles 4	Lin (TPE); L 2-3	Burkhardt (GER); W 3-0	Sandoval (VEN); W 3-0	1 Q	N/A	Sutter (SUI); W 3-0	Stefanu (CZE); L 0-3	Martin (FRA); W 3-1	3rd place, bronze medalist(s)
Jung Eun Chang	Men's singles 5	Chang (TPE); W 3-0	Cetin (GER); W 3-0	Krizanec (CRO); W 3-2	1 Q	Djurasinovic (SCG); W 3-0	Robles (ESP); W 3-2	Kwong (HKG); W 3-0	Kim (KOR); L 2-3	2nd place, silver medalist(s)
Kang Seong Hoon	Men's singles 1	Launonen (FIN); L 0-3	Zumkehr (KOR); W 3-1	Maslup (ARG); W 3-0	2 Q	N/A	Haylan (ARG); W 3-2	Lee (KOR); L 1-3	Kilger (GER); L 3-2	4
Kim Byoung Young	Men's singles 5	Djurasinovic (SCG); W 3-0	Pazaran (MEX); W 3-0	Hoegstedt (SWE); W 3-0	1 Q	N/A	Lin (TPE); W 3-1	Durand (FRA); W 3-0	Jun (KOR); W 3-2	1st place, gold medalist(s)
Kim Gong Yong	Men's singles 2	Revucky (SVK); W 3-1	Reup (AUT); W 3-0	Gruenkemeyer (GER); W 3-0	1 Q	N/A	Sorabella (FRA); W 3-1	Kim (KOR); W 3-1	Riapos (SVK); L 1-3	2nd place, silver medalist(s)
Kim Kyung Mook	Men's singles 2	Molliens (FRA); L 0-3	Minami (JPN); W 3-0	Kristjansson (ISL); L 3-0	2 Q	N/A	Kurkinen (FIN); W 3-1	Kim (KOR); L 1-3	Revucky (SVK); W 3-1	3rd place, bronze medalist(s)
Kim Young Gun	Men's singles 3	Robinson (GBR); W 3-1	Rodríguez (ESP); W 3-1	Rosnes (NOR); W 3-0	1 Q	N/A	Kosco (SVK); W 3-1	Piñas (ESP); W 3-0	Robin (FRA); W 3-0	1st place, gold medalist(s)
Lee Cheon Sik	Men's singles 8	Csejtey (SVK); L 1-3	Loicq (BEL); L 1-3	Kovacic (CRO); W 3-1	3	Did not advance				
Lee Hae Gon	Men's singles 1	Nikelis (GER); W 3–3	Kaiser (HUN); W 3–0	Trujillo Yero (CUB); W 3–0	1 Q	Bye		Kang (KOR); W 3–1	Nikelis (GER); L 0-3	2nd place, silver medalist(s)
Park Jun-young	Men's singles 4	Ghion (BEL); L 2-3	Martin (FRA); L 1-3	Lis (POL); L 1-3	4	Did not advance				
Um Tae Hyung	Men's singles 4	Pechard (FRA); L 2-3	Kober (GER); L 1-3	Zhang (CHN); W 3-2	3	Did not advance				
Yang Heung Sik	Men's singles 3	Robin (FRA); L 0-3	Trofan (GBR); W 3-2	da Silva (BRA); L 2-3	3	Did not advance				

==== Teams ====
Athlete	Event	Preliminaries				Quarterfinals	Semifinals	Final / BM	
Athlete	Event	Opposition Result	Opposition Result	Opposition Result	Rank	Opposition Result	Opposition Result	Opposition Result	Rank
Kang Seong Hoon; Kim Gong Yong; Kim Kyung Mook; Lee Hae Gon	Men's teams 1-2	Slovakia (SVK); W 3-2	Finland (FIN); W 3–0	Argentina (ARG); W 3–0	1 Q	N/A	Germany (GER); W 3-1	Slovakia (SVK); W 3–1	1st place, gold medalist(s)
Cho Jae Kwan; Kim Young Gun; Yang Heung Sik	Men's teams 3	France (FRA); L 1-3	Spain (ESP); W 3-1	Slovakia (SVK); W 3-0	2 Q	N/A	Germany (GER); W 3-1	Great Britain (GBR); W 3-0	1st place, gold medalist(s)
Choi Kyoung Sik; Park Jun-young; Um Tae Hyung	Men's teams 4	China (CHN); W 3-2	Brazil (BRA); W 3-0	N/A	1 Q	N/A	Germany (GER); W 3-0	France (FRA); W 3-2	1st place, gold medalist(s)
Jung Eun Chang; Kim Byoung Young	Men's teams 5	Serbia and Montenegro (SCG); W 3-0	Great Britain (GBR); W 3-0	N/A	1 Q	Norway (NOR); W 3-1	Chinese Taipei (TPE); W 3-1	Czech Republic (CZE); L 2-3	2nd place, silver medalist(s)

=== Wheelchair fencing ===
==== Men ====
Athlete	Event	Qualification			Round of 16	Quarterfinal	Semifinal	Final / BM	
Athlete	Event	Opposition	Score	Rank	Opposition Score	Opposition Score	Opposition Score	Opposition Score	Rank
Park Tae Hoon	Men's épée B	Chung (HKG)	L 1–5	3 Q	Rodgers (USA); L 7-15	Did not advance			
Park Tae Hoon	Men's épée B	Komar (UKR)	L 2-5	3 Q	Rodgers (USA); L 7-15	Did not advance			
Park Tae Hoon	Men's épée B	Sarri (ITA)	W 5-3	3 Q	Rodgers (USA); L 7-15	Did not advance			
Park Tae Hoon	Men's épée B	Hisakawa (JPN)	L 3-5	3 Q	Rodgers (USA); L 7-15	Did not advance			
Park Tae Hoon	Men's épée B	Soler (ESP)	W 5-2	3 Q	Rodgers (USA); L 7-15	Did not advance			
Park Tae Hoon	Men's sabre B	Czop (POL)	L 1-5	4 Q	Heaton (GBR); L 12-15	Did not advance			
Park Tae Hoon	Men's sabre B	Mari (ITA)	L 4-5	4 Q	Heaton (GBR); L 12-15	Did not advance			
Park Tae Hoon	Men's sabre B	Hui (HKG)	W 5-4	4 Q	Heaton (GBR); L 12-15	Did not advance			
Park Tae Hoon	Men's sabre B	Arnau (ESP)	W 5-2	4 Q	Heaton (GBR); L 12-15	Did not advance			
Park Tae Hoon	Men's sabre B	Moreno (USA)	W 5-3	4 Q	Heaton (GBR); L 12-15	Did not advance			

=== Wheelchair tennis ===
==== Men ====
Athlete	Class	Event	Round of 64	Round of 32	Round of 16	Quarterfinals	Semifinals	Finals
Athlete	Class	Event	Opposition Result	Opposition Result	Opposition Result	Opposition Result	Opposition Result	Opposition Result
Kwak Dong Ju	Open	Men's singles	Harel (FRA); L 2-6, 1-6	Did not advance				
Lee Ha Gel	Open	Men's singles	Musa (MAS); W 6–0, 6–0	Bonaccurso (AUS); L 2-6, 3-6	Did not advance			
Kwak Dong Ju; Lee Ha Gel	Open	Men's doubles	N/A	Gardner (GBR); Plowman (GBR); W 6-2, 6-1	Ammerlaan (NED); Stuurman (NED); L 3-6, 1-6	Did not advance		

==== Women ====
Athlete	Class	Event	Round of 32	Round of 16	Quarterfinals	Semifinals	Finals
Athlete	Class	Event	Opposition Result	Opposition Result	Opposition Result	Opposition Result	Opposition Result
Hong Young Suk	Open	Women's singles	Griffioen (NED); W 6-4, 4-6, 7-6	Kalt (NED); L 3-6, 2-6	Did not advance		
Hwang Myung Hee	Open	Women's singles	Forshaw (GBR); L 2-6, 0-6	Did not advance			
Hong Young Suk; Hwang Myung Hee	Open	Women's doubles	N/A	Korb (USA); Dorsett (USA); W 6-2, 6-2	Erath (SUI); Kalt (SUI); L 3-2, 2-6	Did not advance	

== See also ==
- South Korea at the Paralympics
- South Korea at the 2004 Summer Olympics
