= Shooting at the 2004 Summer Paralympics – Men's 10 metre air rifle standing SH1 =

Men's 10m Air Rifle Standing SH1 at the XII Paralympic Games
- Paralympic Shooting
- Venue: Markopoulo Olympic Shooting Centre
- Dates: 19 September 2004
- Competitors: 22 from 16 nations
- Winning points: 693.4

Medalists
1st place, gold medalist(s)		Jonas Jacobsson	Sweden
2nd place, silver medalist(s)		Franc Pinter	Slovenia
3rd place, bronze medalist(s)		Ashley Adams	Australia

The Men's 10m Air Rifle Standing SH1 shooting event at the 2004 Summer Paralympics was competed on 19 September. It was won by Jonas Jacobsson, representing Sweden.

== Preliminary ==
Qualified for next round

19 Sept. 2004, 09:00

Rank	Athlete	Points	Notes
1	Jonas Jacobsson (SWE)	593	=WR Q
2	Franc Pinter (SLO)	591	Q
3	Ashley Adams (AUS)	590	Q
4	Walter Holzner (AUT)	588	Q
5	Jung Jin Owan (KOR)	588	Q
6	Kazimierz Mechula (DEN)	588	Q
7	Pyun Moo Jo (KOR)	588	Q
8	Dan Jordan (USA)	587	Q
9	Sim Jae Yong (KOR)	585	
10	Norbert Gau (GER)	583	
10	Werner Mueller (AUT)	583	
10	Seyedramzan Salehne Jad Amrei (IRI)	583	
13	Cedric Friggeri (FRA)	580	
14	Joachim Schaefer (GER)	579	
15	Liu Wen Chang (TPE)	576	
16	Takashi Matsumoto (JPN)	572	
17	Miguel Orobitg (ESP)	569	
18	Josef Neumaier (GER)	567	
18	Colin Willis (NZL)	567	
20	August Wyss (SUI)	564	
21	Waldemar Andruszkiewicz (POL)	556	
22	Bjorn Samuelsson (SWE)	555	

== Final round ==
19 Sept. 2004, 12:30

Rank	Athlete	Points	Notes
1st place, gold medalist(s)	Jonas Jacobsson (SWE)	693.4	
2nd place, silver medalist(s)	Franc Pinter (SLO)	692.6	
3rd place, bronze medalist(s)	Ashley Adams (AUS)	692.2	
4	Pyun Moo Jo (KOR)	691.8	
5	Jung Jin Owan (KOR)	690.7	
6	Walter Holzner (AUT)	690.5	
7	Kazimierz Mechula (DEN)	688.9	
8	Dan Jordan (USA)	688.5	
