= Miroslav Jambor =

Slovak para table tennis player

Personal information
- Nickname: Mirko
- Born: 8 March 1979 (age 47) Poprad, Czechoslovakia
- Home town: Štrba, Slovakia
- Height: 175 cm (5 ft 9 in)

Sport
- Country: Slovakia
- Sport: Para table tennis
- Disability: Haemophilia
- Disability class: C7
- Club: SK Zarnovica/Polstav Bystricany 41
- Coached by: Sasa Dragas
Medal record
Men's para table tennis
Representing Slovakia
Paralympic Games
Silver medal – second place	2008 Beijing	Men's team C6-8
Bronze medal – third place	2008 Beijing	Men's singles C8
European Championships
Silver medal – second place	2011 Split	Men's teams C8
Silver medal – second place	2015 Vejle	Men's teams C8
Bronze medal – third place	2009 Genoa	Men's teams C8
Bronze medal – third place	2017 Lasko	Men's teams C7

Miroslav Jambor (born 8 March 1979) is a Slovak para table tennis player who plays in sports category 7. He has haemophilia which causes him to have knee problems when standing. He is currently ranked world number 20 in his sports category.
