= Chen Gang (table tennis) =

Chinese para table tennis player

Personal information
- Born: February 15, 1968 (age 58) Wuhan, Hubei, China

Sport
- Sport: Table tennis
- Playing style: Right-handed penhold
- Disability class: 8
- Highest ranking: 4 (October 2008)
Medal record
Men's para table tennis
Representing China
Paralympic Games
Gold medal – first place	2008 Beijing	Singles C8
Gold medal – first place	2008 Beijing	Teams C6–8
FESPIC Games
Gold medal – first place	2006 Kuala Lumpur	Singles C8
Gold medal – first place	2006 Kuala Lumpur	Teams C8
Asia/South Pacific Championships
Silver medal – second place	2005 Kuala Lumpur	Teams C8

Chen Gang
- Traditional Chinese: 陳剛
- Simplified Chinese: 陈刚
Transcriptions
Standard Mandarin
- Hanyu Pinyin: Chén Gāng

Chen Gang (Chinese: 陈刚, born 15 February 1968) is a Chinese retired para table tennis player. He won two gold medals at the 2008 Summer Paralympics.

Chen lost his left leg in a 2001 car accident. He played table tennis as a youngster, and was briefly a teammate of the eventual Olympic champion Chen Jing.
