= Choi Kyoung-sik =

South Korean para table tennis player

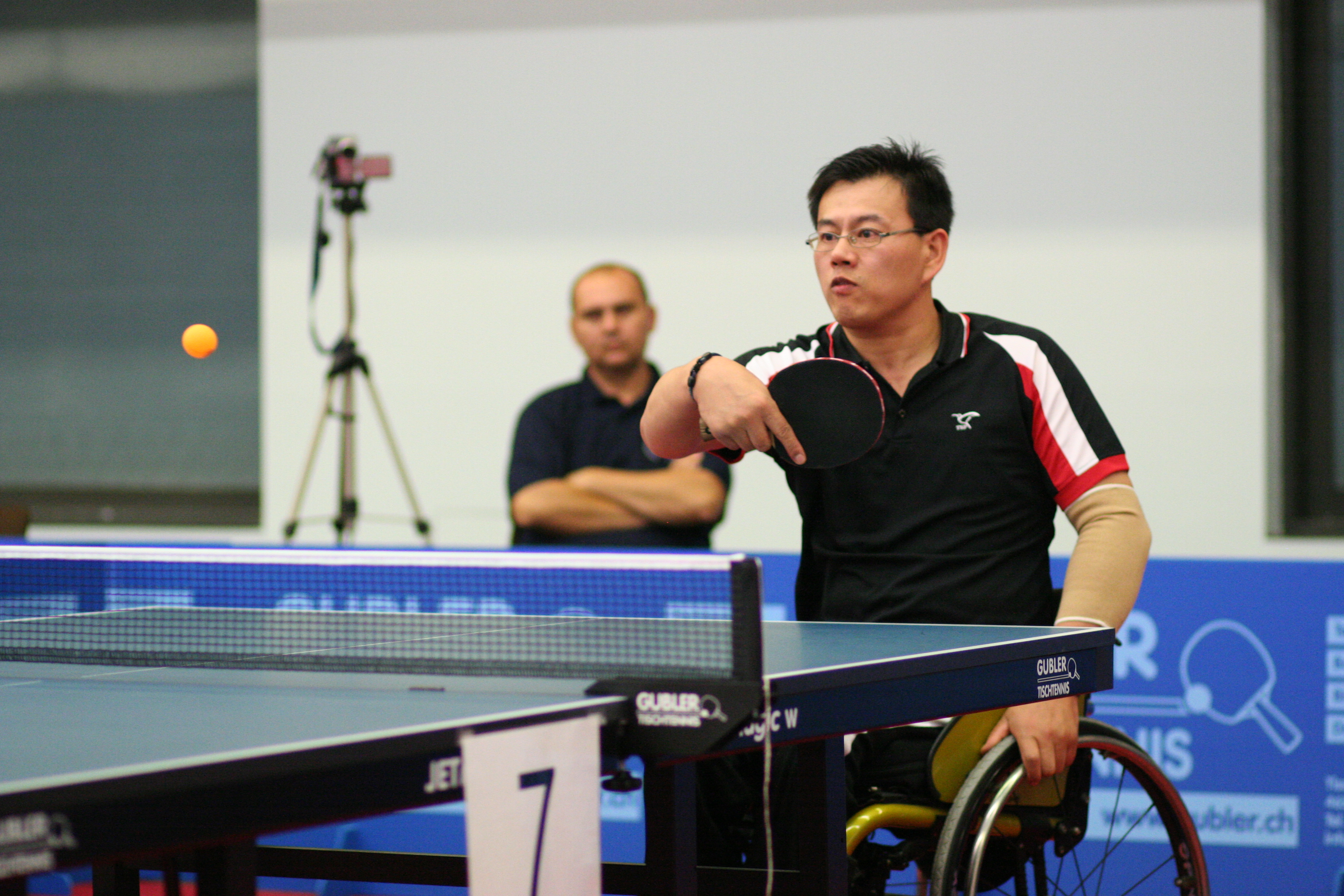
- Choi at the 2006 World Para Table Tennis Championships

Personal information
- Born: September 24, 1966 (age 59) Changnyeong County, South Gyeongsang, South Korea
- Height: 178 cm (5 ft 10 in)
- Weight: 75 kg (165 lb)

Sport
- Sport: Table tennis
- Playing style: Right-handed shakehand grip
- Disability class: 4
- Highest ranking: 1 (October 2002)
Medal record
Men's para table tennis
Representing South Korea
Paralympic Games
Gold medal – first place	2004 Athens	Teams C4
Gold medal – first place	2008 Beijing	Teams C4–5
Silver medal – second place	2000 Sydney	Teams C4
Bronze medal – third place	2000 Sydney	Singles C4
Bronze medal – third place	2004 Athens	Singles C4
World Championships
Gold medal – first place	2002 Taipei	Singles C4
Gold medal – first place	2002 Taipei	Open singles in wheelchair
Gold medal – first place	2006 Montreux	Singles C4
Silver medal – second place	1998 Paris	Teams C4
Silver medal – second place	2002 Taipei	Teams C4
Silver medal – second place	2006 Montreux	Teams C4
Silver medal – second place	2010 Gwangju	Teams C4
FESPIC Games
Gold medal – first place	2006 Kuala Lumpur	Singles C4
Gold medal – first place	2006 Kuala Lumpur	Teams C4
Asia and Oceania Championships
Gold medal – first place	2005 Kuala Lumpur	Teams C4
Silver medal – second place	2007 Seoul	Open singles in wheelchair
Silver medal – second place	2007 Seoul	Teams C4
FESPIC Championships
Gold medal – first place	1997 Hong Kong	Singles C4
Gold medal – first place	1997 Hong Kong	Open singles in wheelchair
Gold medal – first place	1999 Taipei	Open singles in wheelchair
Gold medal – first place	1999 Taipei	Teams C4
Gold medal – first place	2003 Shanghai	Teams C4
Bronze medal – third place	1999 Taipei	Doubles C1–5
Bronze medal – third place	2003 Shanghai	Singles C4
Bronze medal – third place	2003 Shanghai	Open singles in wheelchair

- Choi Kyoung-sik
- Hangul: 최경식
- RR: Choe Gyeongsik
- MR: Ch'oe Kyŏngsik

Choi Kyoung-sik (Korean: 최경식, born 24 September 1966) is a South Korean para table tennis coach and former player. He has won five medals in three Paralympic Games (2000, 2004, and 2008).

He has been coaching the national team since his retirement.
