= Alejandro Albor =

American cyclist

Personal information
- Born: January 13, 1964 (age 62) Michoacán, Mexico

Sport
- Country: United States
- Sport: Para-cycling: Handcycle
Medal record
Cycling
Representing United States
Paralympic Games
Silver medal – second place	2004 Athens	Road Race HC B/C
Silver medal – second place	2008 Beijing	Indiv. Road Race HC C
Bronze medal – third place	2008 Beijing	Indiv. Time Trial HC C
IPC Cycling World Championships
Gold medal – first place	2006 Aigle	46.4 km
UCI Para-cycling Road World Championships
Silver medal – second place	2007 Bordeaux	Time Trial
Bronze medal – third place	2007 Bordeaux	Road Race

Alejandro Albor (born January 13, 1964) is an American cyclist who won a silver medal at the 2004 Summer Paralympics in Athens, Greece and a silver and bronze medal at the 2008 Summer Paralympics in Beijing, China.

Albor was born in Tzintzimeo, a town in the state of Michoacán in Mexico. When he was 15 years old he and his family relocated to the United States. He lost his legs below the knee at the age of 18, when a car he was driving crashed into a moving train. Albor now owns and runs A-WON HandCycles, a business which builds handcycles. He is married and has three children.
