= Lubník =

- Municipality
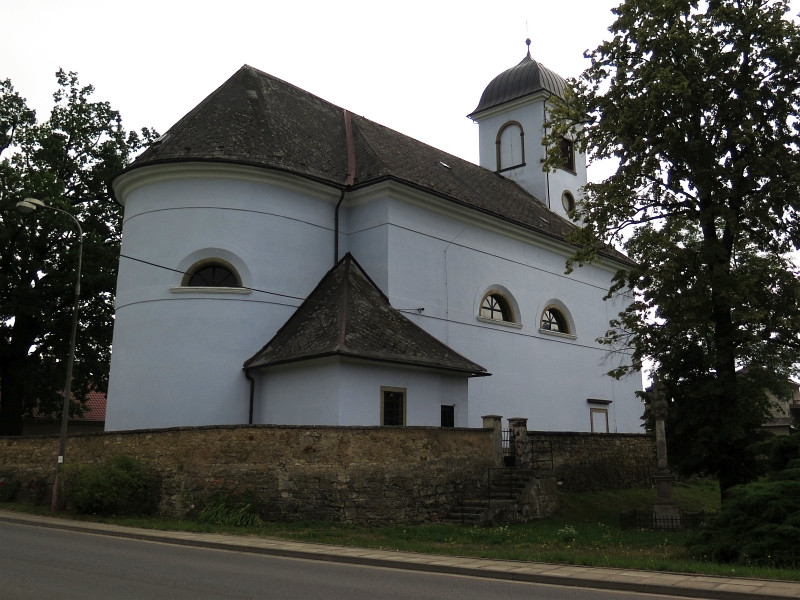
- Church of Saints Peter and Paul

- Flag Coat of arms

- Location in the Czech Republic
- Coordinates: 49°53′19″N 16°39′42″E
- Country: Czech Republic
- Region: Pardubice
- District: Ústí nad Orlicí
- First mentioned: 1267

Area
  - Total: 5.09 km^{2} (1.97 sq mi)
- Elevation: 373 m (1,224 ft)

Population (2026-01-01)
  - Total: 377
  - Density: 74.1/km^{2} (192/sq mi)
- Time zone: UTC+1 (CET)
  - Summer (DST): UTC+2 (CEST)
- Postal code: 563 01
- Website: www.lubnik.cz

Lubník (German: Lußdorf) is a municipality and village in Ústí nad Orlicí District in the Pardubice Region of the Czech Republic. It has about 400 inhabitants.

Lubník lies approximately 21 kilometres (13 mi) south-east of Ústí nad Orlicí, 66 km (41 mi) east of Pardubice, and 163 km (101 mi) east of Prague.

== Demographics ==
Historical population
| Year | Pop. | ±% |
|---|---|---|
| 1869 | 552 | — |
| 1880 | 516 | −6.5% |
| 1890 | 492 | −4.7% |
| 1900 | 533 | +8.3% |
| 1910 | 482 | −9.6% |
| 1921 | 444 | −7.9% |
| 1930 | 437 | −1.6% |
| 1950 | 299 | −31.6% |
| 1961 | 372 | +24.4% |
| 1970 | 342 | −8.1% |
| 1980 | 336 | −1.8% |
| 1991 | 332 | −1.2% |
| 2001 | 288 | −13.3% |
| 2011 | 323 | +12.2% |
| 2021 | 363 | +12.4% |
Source: Censuses
