= Michel Schaller =

French para table tennis player

Personal information
- Born: 28 June 1969 (age 57) Moulins-lès-Metz, France
- Home town: Moselle, France

Sport
- Country: France
- Sport: Para table tennis
- Disability: Cerebral palsy
- Disability class: C8
- Retired: 2014
Medal record
Para table tennis
Representing France
Paralympic Games
Silver medal – second place	2000 Sydney	Men's teams C8
Silver medal – second place	2004 Athens	Men's teams C8
World Championships
Gold medal – first place	1998 Paris	Men's teams C8
Gold medal – first place	2002 Taipei	Men's teams C8
European Championships
Gold medal – first place	2001 Frankfurt	Men's teams C8
Silver medal – second place	1997 Stockholm	Men's teams C7-8
Silver medal – second place	1999 Piešťany	Men's teams C8
Bronze medal – third place	1995 Hillerød	Men's singles C8
Bronze medal – third place	1995 Hillerød	Men's teams C8
Bronze medal – third place	2003 Zagreb	Men's teams C8
Bronze medal – third place	2007 Kranjska Gora	Men's teams C8

Michel Schaller (born 28 June 1969) is a French retired para table tennis player who competed in international level events. He stopped competing in international events and played in national competitions until he finally retired in 2014. He won multiple medals in team events along with Stéphane Messi, Alain Pichon and Julien Soyer.
