= Mateja Pintar =

Slovenian para table tennis player

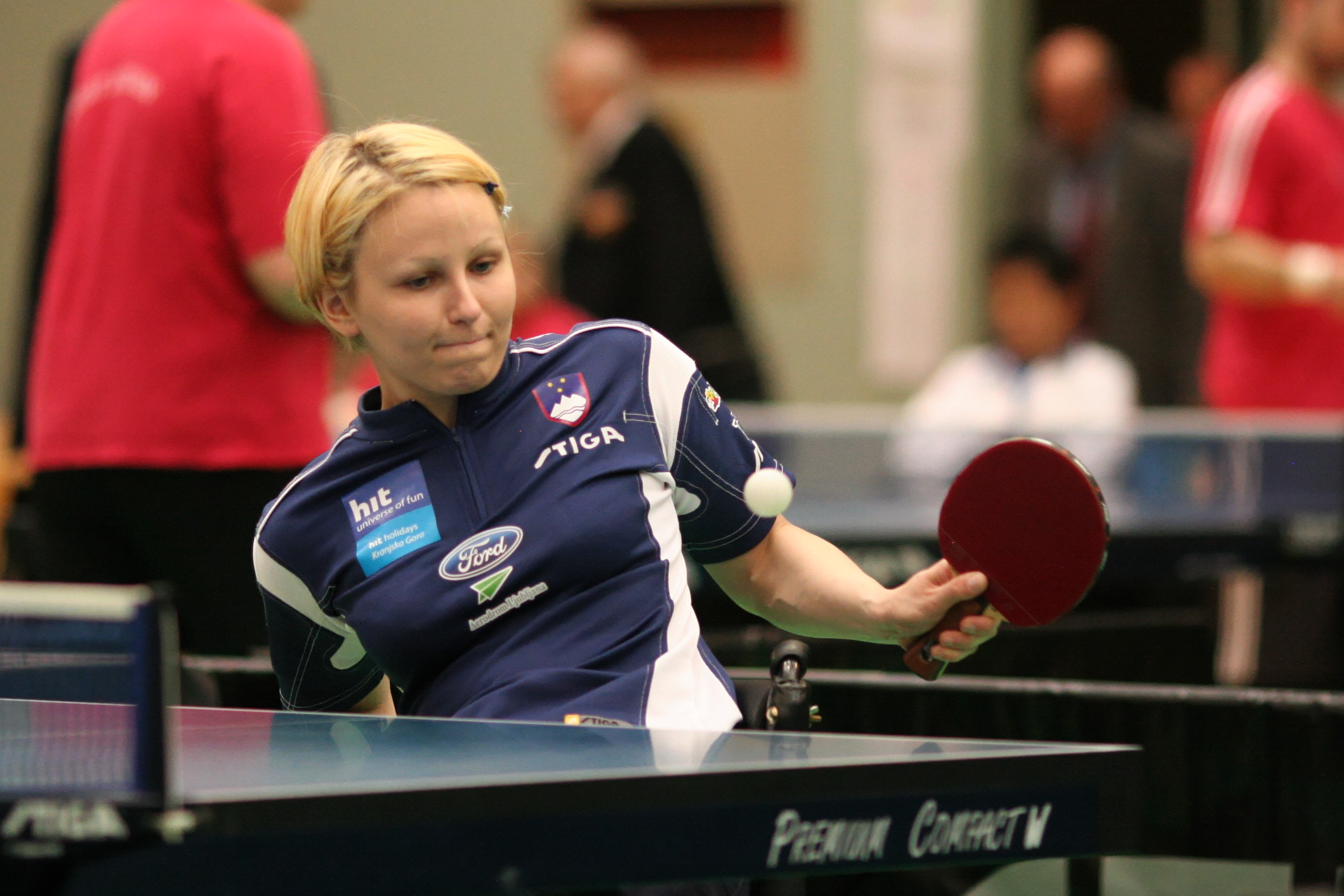
- Mateja Pintar in 2009

Personal information
- National team: Slovenia
- Born: 16 July 1985 (age 40)
- Occupation: Translator

Sport
- Country: Slovenia
- Sport: Table tennis
- Disability: Lower body paralysis
- Disability class: 3
- Former partner: Andreja Dolinar
- Retired: 2017
Medal record
Women's para table tennis
Representing Slovenia
Paralympic Games
Gold medal – first place	2004 Athens	Individual class 3
Bronze medal – third place	2008 Beijing	Individual class 3
World Para Table Tennis Championships
Bronze medal – third place	2006 Montreux	Individual class 3
Bronze medal – third place	2010 Gwangju	Doubles class 3
- Updated on 27 November 2017

Mateja Pintar (born 16 July 1985) is a Slovene para table tennis player, who won a gold medal in her class at the 2004 Summer Paralympics, and a bronze at the 2008 Games.

== Career ==
Pintar enjoyed sports as a child. A month prior to her 15th birthday, while hiking on a hill near Lubník, Slovenia, she slipped and fell. Pintar fell unconscious and was evacuated by helicopter. She had damaged several vertebrae and compressed her spine. Pintar lost the use of her legs, and required the use of a wheelchair. She spent five months rehabilitating, during which time she tried table tennis for the first time. She enjoyed it, and following fellow Slovenian Andreja Dolinar's fourth place at the 2000 Summer Paralympics, Pintar decided that she wanted to pursue the sport after she had completed education.

Her first tournament was in Bibione, Italy, in 2002, where she took a set off Olympic champion Alena Kanova of Slovakia. After a point was challenged, she lost focus, which she later described as the lowest point of her career. She teamed up with Dolinar and won the doubles competition at the European Championship, qualifying for the 2004 Summer Paralympics in Athens, Greece, at the same time. She attended her first Paralympics in Athens, later saying that the toughest match was the semi-final game. Pintar went on to win the individual gold medal, making her well known in her home country.

She went on to win a bronze medal at the 2004 World Para Table Tennis Championships in Montreux, Switzerland, and repeated that success at the 2008 Summer Paralympics in Beijing, China. Pintar stopped competing in 2014, and announced her formal retirement from table tennis in 2017. In the meanwhile, she had taken up work as a translator.

In 2024, she served as an announcer for table tennis events at the Paris Olympics.
