= Marc Ledoux =

Belgian Paralympic table tennis player

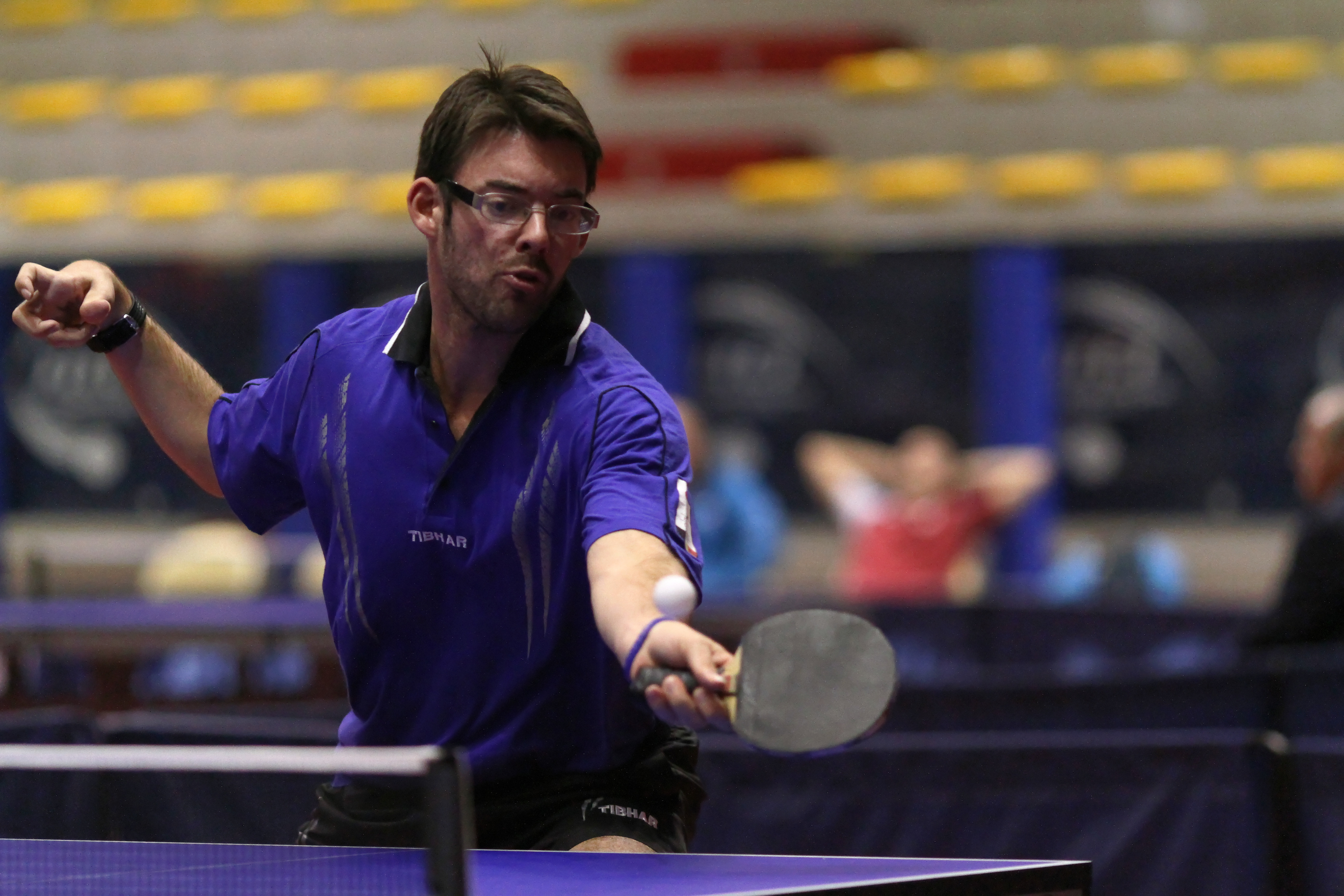

Personal information
- Full name: Marc Philippe Ledoux
- Born: 4 March 1986 (age 40) La Louviere, Belgium
- Home town: La Louviere, Belgium
- Height: 187 cm (6 ft 2 in)

Sport
- Country: Belgium
- Sport: Para table tennis
- Disability: Cerebral palsy
- Disability class: C8
- Club: RTTC Manage ELSH La Louviere Handisport
- Coached by: Michel Verhaverbeke
Medal record
Para table tennis
Representing Belgium
Paralympic Games
Gold medal – first place	2004 Athens	Teams C8
Silver medal – second place	2004 Athens	Singles C8
World Championships
Silver medal – second place	2006 Montreux	Teams C8
Silver medal – second place	2010 Gwangju	Teams C8
Bronze medal – third place	2002 Taipei	Singles C8
Bronze medal – third place	2014 Beijing	Teams C8
European Championships
Gold medal – first place	2007 Kranjska Gora	Teams C8
Gold medal – first place	2013 Lignano	Teams C8
Silver medal – second place	2003 Zagreb	Teams C8
Silver medal – second place	2005 Gesolo	Teams C8
Silver medal – second place	2009 Genoa	Teams C8
Bronze medal – third place	2011 Split	Singles C8
Bronze medal – third place	2011 Split	Teams C8

Marc Philippe Ledoux (born 4 March 1986 in La Louvière) is a Belgian Paralympic table tennis player with cerebral palsy. His father, Alain Ledoux, also competed in Paralympic table tennis. Marc Ledoux has won two medals at the 2004 Summer Paralympics. He has won two European titles and also won silver and bronze medals in team events with Mathieu Loicq and Nico Vergeylen.
