= Zhang Jie (table tennis) =

Chinese para table tennis player

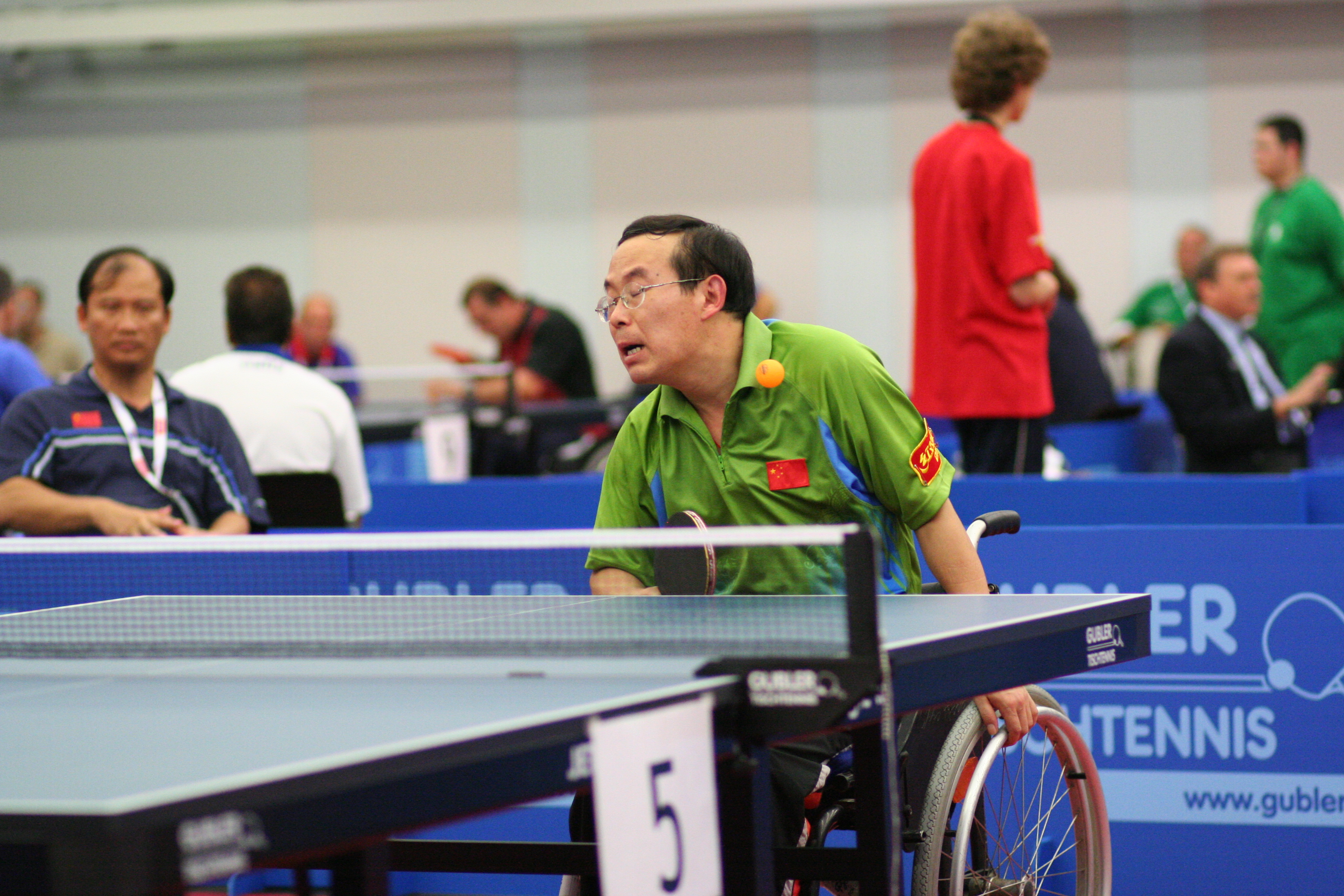
- Zhang at the 2006 World Para Table Tennis Championships

Personal information
- Born: 8 January 1966 (age 60) Pingdu, Shandong, China

Sport
- Sport: Table tennis
- Playing style: Right-handed shakehand grip
- Disability class: 4
- Highest ranking: 17 (April 2004)
Medal record
Men's para table tennis
Representing China
Paralympic Games
Bronze medal – third place	2004 Athens	Teams C4
FESPIC Games
Gold medal – first place	2002 Busan	Teams C4
Asian Championships
Silver medal – second place	2005 Kuala Lumpur	Teams C4
FESPIC Championships
Silver medal – second place	2003 Shanghai	Teams C4

Zhang Jie
- Traditional Chinese: 張杰
- Simplified Chinese: 张杰
Transcriptions
Standard Mandarin
- Hanyu Pinyin: Zhāng Jié

Zhang Jie (Chinese: 张杰, born 8 January 1966) is a Chinese retired para table tennis player. He won a Class 4 team bronze medal at the 2004 Summer Paralympics with Zhang Yan.
