= Satoko Fujiwara =

Japanese para table tennis player

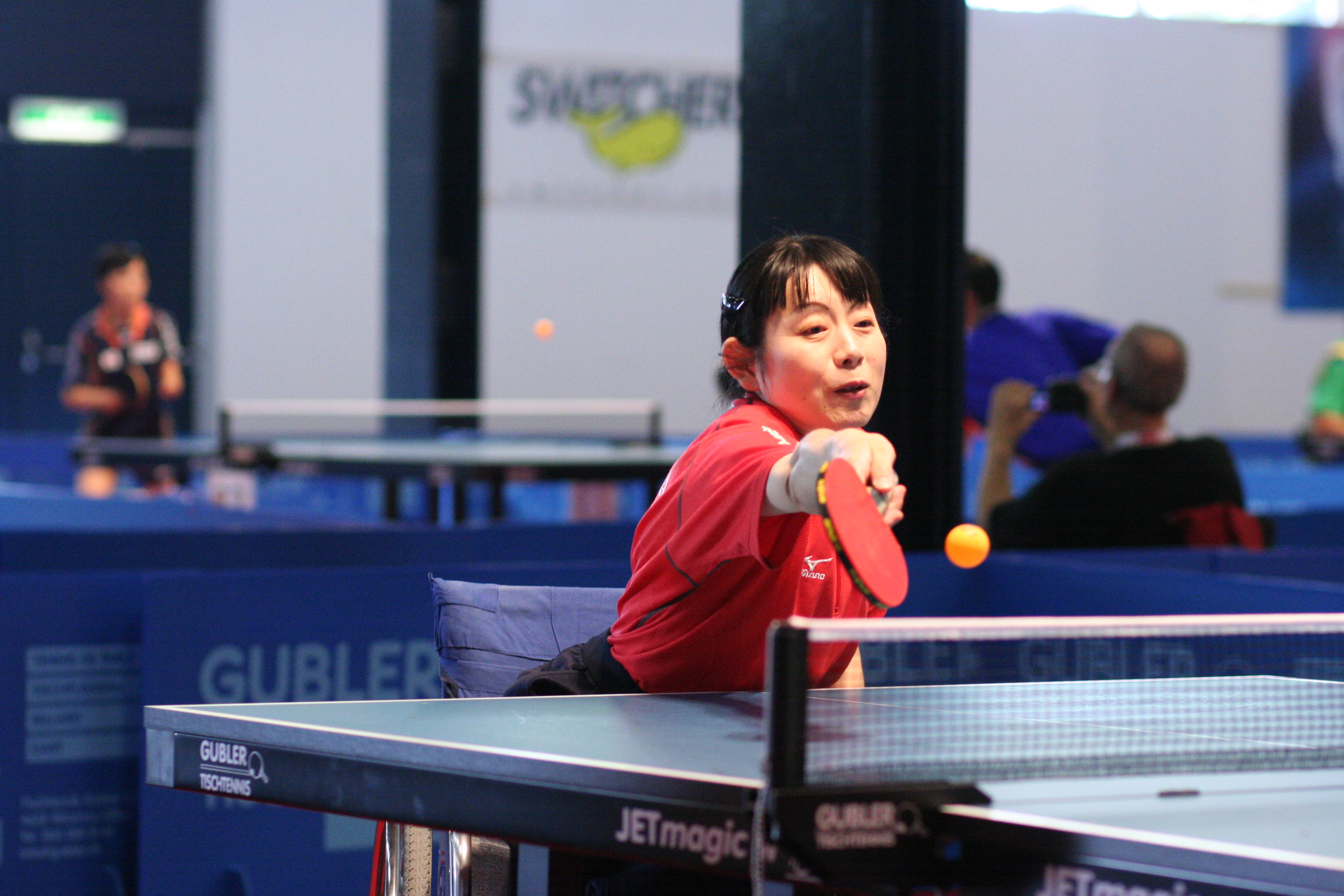
- Fujiwara at the 2006 World Para Table Tennis Championships

Personal information
- Born: 27 November 1963 (age 62) Seto, Aichi, Japan

Sport
- Sport: Table tennis
- Playing style: Right-handed shakehand grip
- Disability class: 3
- Highest ranking: 2 (December 2003)
Medal record
Women's para table tennis
Representing Japan
Paralympic Games
Silver medal – second place	2000 Sydney	Singles C3
World Championships
Gold medal – first place	1998 Paris	Teams C1–3
Bronze medal – third place	2002 Taipei	Singles C3
Bronze medal – third place	2002 Taipei	Teams C1–3
Asia/South Pacific Championships
Silver medal – second place	2005 Kuala Lumpur	Open singles standing
FESPIC Championships
Gold medal – first place	1997 Hong Kong	Singles C3
Gold medal – first place	1999 Taipei	Singles C3
Gold medal – first place	1999 Taipei	Teams C3–4
Gold medal – first place	2001 Osaka	Singles C3
Gold medal – first place	2001 Osaka	Teams C3–4
Bronze medal – third place	1997 Hong Kong	Open singles in wheelchair

Satoko Fujiwara (藤原 佐登子, Fujiwara Satoko; born 27 November 1963) is a Japanese retired para table tennis player. She won a silver medal at the 2000 Summer Paralympics.

She began to need to use a wheelchair at the age of 21 after she experienced an illness that affected both legs.
