= Nico Vergeylen =

Belgian para table tennis player

Personal information
- Nickname: Nicky Boy
- Born: 6 December 1968 (age 57) Waasmunster, Belgium
- Home town: Sint-Niklaas, Belgium

Sport
- Country: Belgium
- Sport: Para table tennis
- Disability class: C8
- Retired: 2014
Medal record
Para table tennis
Representing Belgium
Paralympic Games
Gold medal – first place	2004 Athens	Men's teams C8
World Championships
Silver medal – second place	2006 Montreux	Men's teams C8
Silver medal – second place	2010 Beijing	Men's teams C8
European Championships
Gold medal – first place	2007 Kranjska Gora	Men's teams C8
Silver medal – second place	2003 Zagreb	Men's teams C8
Silver medal – second place	2005 Jesolo	Men's teams C8
Silver medal – second place	2009 Genoa	Men's teams C8
Bronze medal – third place	1991 Salou	Men's teams C8
Bronze medal – third place	2011 Split	Men's teams C8

Nico Vergeylen (born 6 December 1968) is a retired Belgian para table tennis player who competed in international level events. He was a Paralympic champion, double World silver medalist and six-time European medalist. He has won most of his team titles alongside Marc Ledoux and Mathieu Loicq.

Vergeylen is now a table tennis coach who trains Florian Van Acker.
