= Valérie Gay =

French para table tennis player

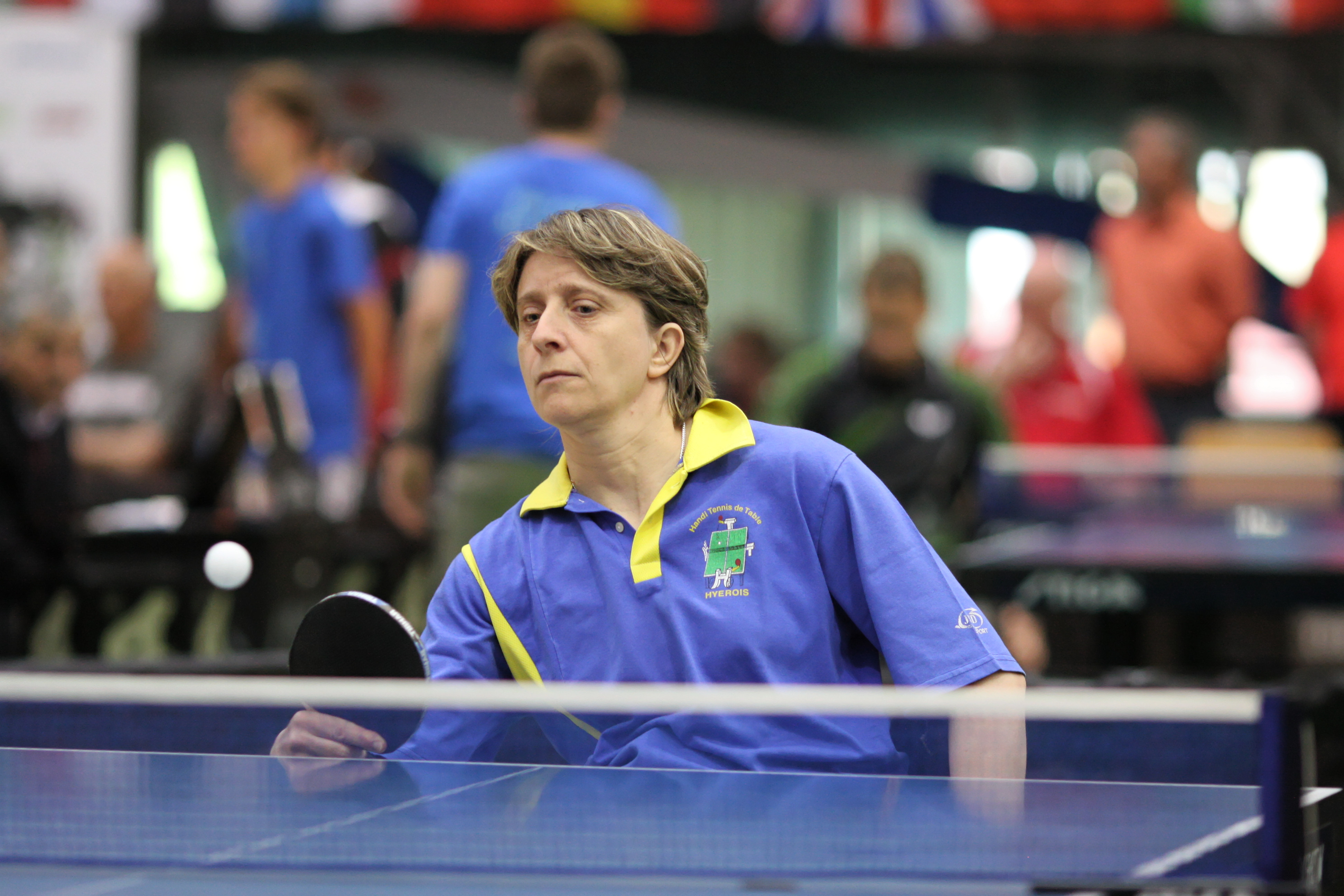

Personal information
- Born: 6 February 1968 (age 58)

Sport
- Country: France
- Sport: Para table tennis
- Disability class: C3
- Retired: 2013
Medal record
Para table tennis
Representing France
World Championships
Silver medal – second place	2006 Montreux	Women's teams C1-3
European Championships
Gold medal – first place	2007 Kranjska Gora	Women's teams C2-3
Silver medal – second place	1999 Piešťany	Women's teams C2-3
Silver medal – second place	2001 Frankfurt	Women's teams C5

Valérie Gay (born 6 February 1968) is a French retired para table tennis player. She competed internationally in team events with Fanny Bertrand, Isabelle Lafaye and Stéphanie Mariage.
