= Julien Soyer =

French para table tennis player

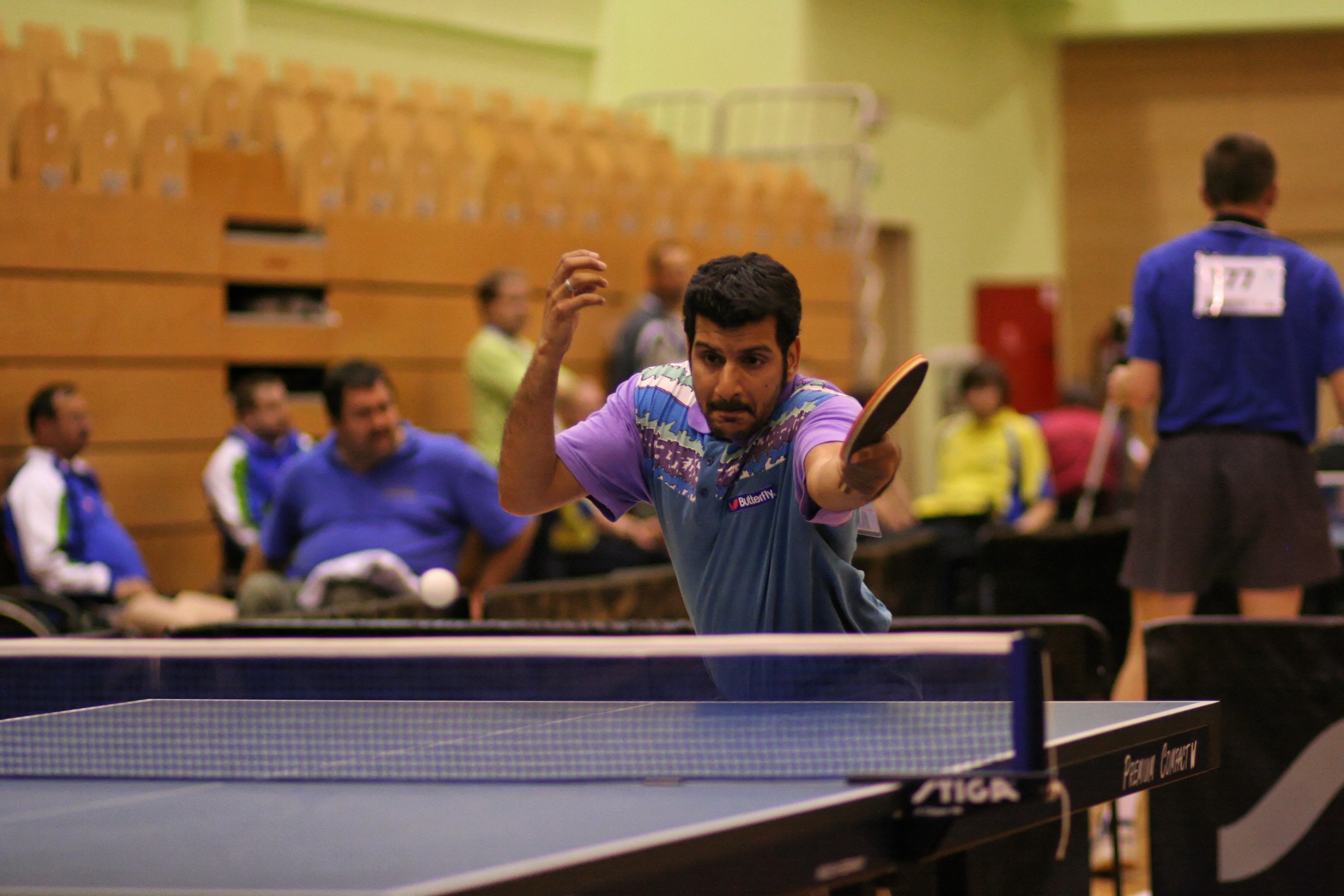
- Soyer at the 2005 European Championships

Personal information
- Born: 4 March 1978 (age 48) Mumbai, Maharashtra, India
- Home town: Nantes, France

Sport
- Country: France
- Sport: Para table tennis
- Disability: Polio
- Disability class: C8
Medal record
Para table tennis
Representing France
Paralympic Games
Silver medal – second place	2000 Sydney	Men's teams C8
Silver medal – second place	2004 Athens	Men's teams C8
World Championships
Gold medal – first place	1998 Paris	Men's teams C8
Gold medal – first place	2002 Taipei	Men's teams C8
European Championships
Gold medal – first place	2003 Zagreb	Men's singles C8
Gold medal – first place	2005 Jesolo	Men's teams C8
Silver medal – second place	1997 Stockholm	Men's teams C7-8
Silver medal – second place	1999 Piešťany	Men's singles C8
Silver medal – second place	1999 Piešťany	Men's teams C8
Silver medal – second place	2005 Jesolo	Men's singles C8
Bronze medal – third place	2003 Zagreb	Men's teams C8

Julien Soyer (born 4 March 1978) is a former para table tennis player from India who competed for France in international level events. He contracted polio aged six months old and had his right leg amputated; he would wear a complete prosthetic when competing in table tennis events. After his retirement from sport, he works as a sports journalist.
