= Rastislav Tureček =

Slovak paralympic cyclist (born 1972)

Personal information
- Born: 14 August 1972 (age 53) Trenčín, Czechoslovakia

Sport
- Country: Slovakia
- Sport: Paralympic cycling
Medal record
Paralympic cycling
Representing Slovakia
Paralympic Games
Gold medal – first place	2004 Athens	Road race HC A
Silver medal – second place	2004 Athens	Time trial HC A
Silver medal – second place	2008 Beijing	Time trial HC A
World Championships
Silver medal – second place	2006 Aigle	Road race HC A
European Championships
Silver medal – second place	2005 Alkmaar	Time trial HC A
Bronze medal – third place	2005 Alkmaar	Road race HC A

Rastislav Tureček (born 14 August 1972) is a Slovak retired Paralympic cyclist who competed at international cycling competitions. He is a Paralympic champion and World and European silver medalist in road cycling. He competed at the Paralympic Games three times.
