= Alain Pichon (table tennis) =

French para table tennis player

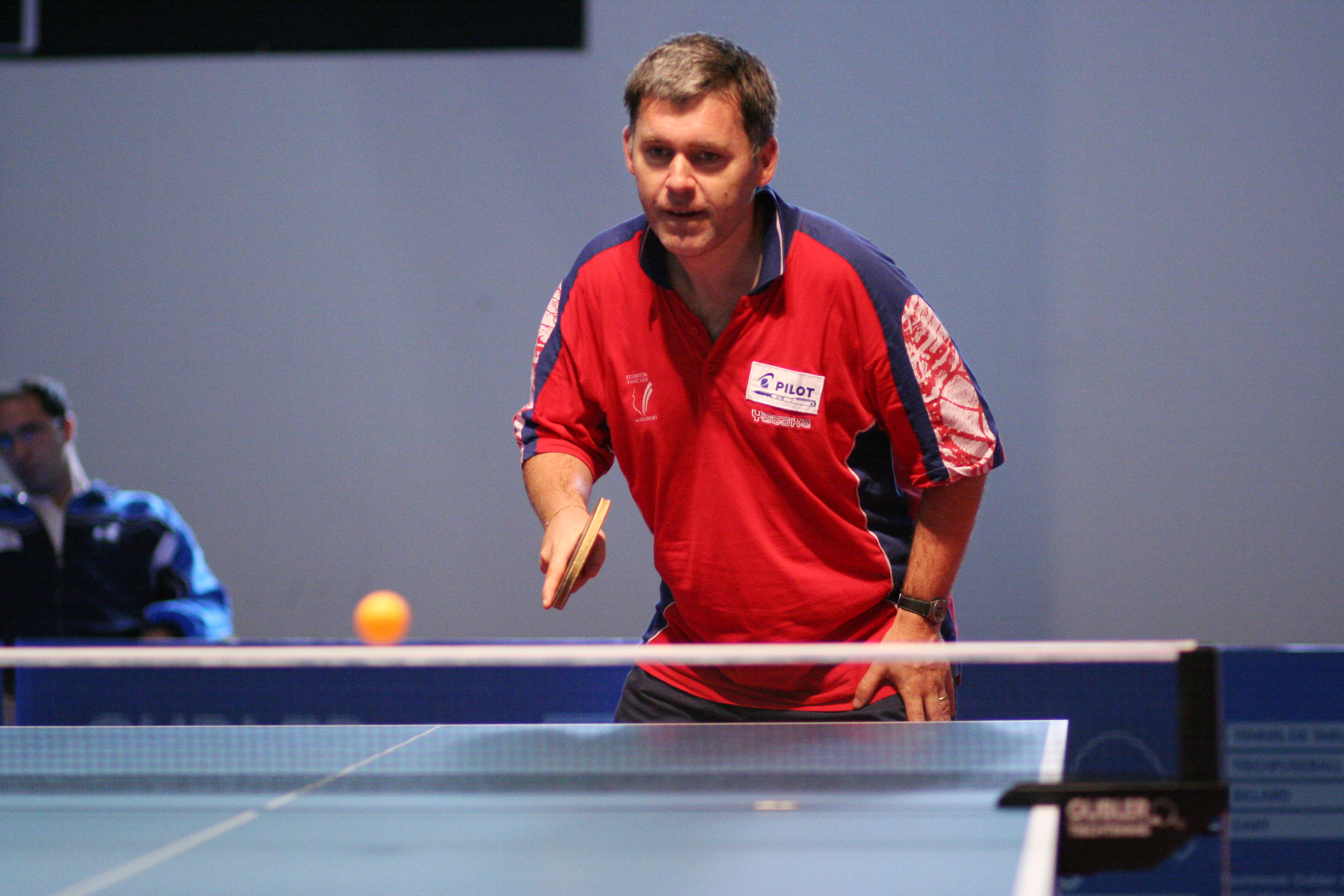
- Pichon in 2006

Personal information
- Born: 17 April 1964 (age 62) Vire, France
- Home town: Caen, France

Sport
- Country: France
- Sport: Para table tennis
- Disability class: C8
- Retired: 2009
Medal record
Men's para table tennis
Representing France
Paralympic Games
Gold medal – first place	1996 Atlanta	Teams C9-10
Silver medal – second place	2000 Sydney	Singles C8
Silver medal – second place	2000 Sydney	Teams C8
Silver medal – second place	2004 Athens	Teams C8
Bronze medal – third place	1992 Barcelona	Teams C9
Bronze medal – third place	1996 Atlanta	Singles C9
Bronze medal – third place	2008 Beijing	Teams C6-8
World Championships
Gold medal – first place	1998 Paris	Teams C9
Gold medal – first place	2002 Taipei	Singles C8
Gold medal – first place	2002 Taipei	Teams C8
Bronze medal – third place	1998 Paris	Singles C9
European Championships
Gold medal – first place	1995 Hillerød	Teams C9
Gold medal – first place	1997 Stockholm	Teams C9
Gold medal – first place	2001 Frankfurt	Teams C8
Silver medal – second place	1995 Hillerød	Singles C9
Silver medal – second place	1999 Piešťany	Teams C9
Silver medal – second place	2001 Frankfurt	Singles C8
Bronze medal – third place	1991 Salou	Teams C9
Bronze medal – third place	1995 Hillerød	Open singles
Bronze medal – third place	2003 Zagreb	Singles C8
Bronze medal – third place	2003 Zagreb	Teams C8

Alain Pichon (born 17 April 1964) is a French former para table tennis player. He is a triple world champion, triple European champion and multi-medalist Paralympian.
