= Galatsi Olympic Hall =

Multi-use indoor arena in Galatsi, Athens, Greece

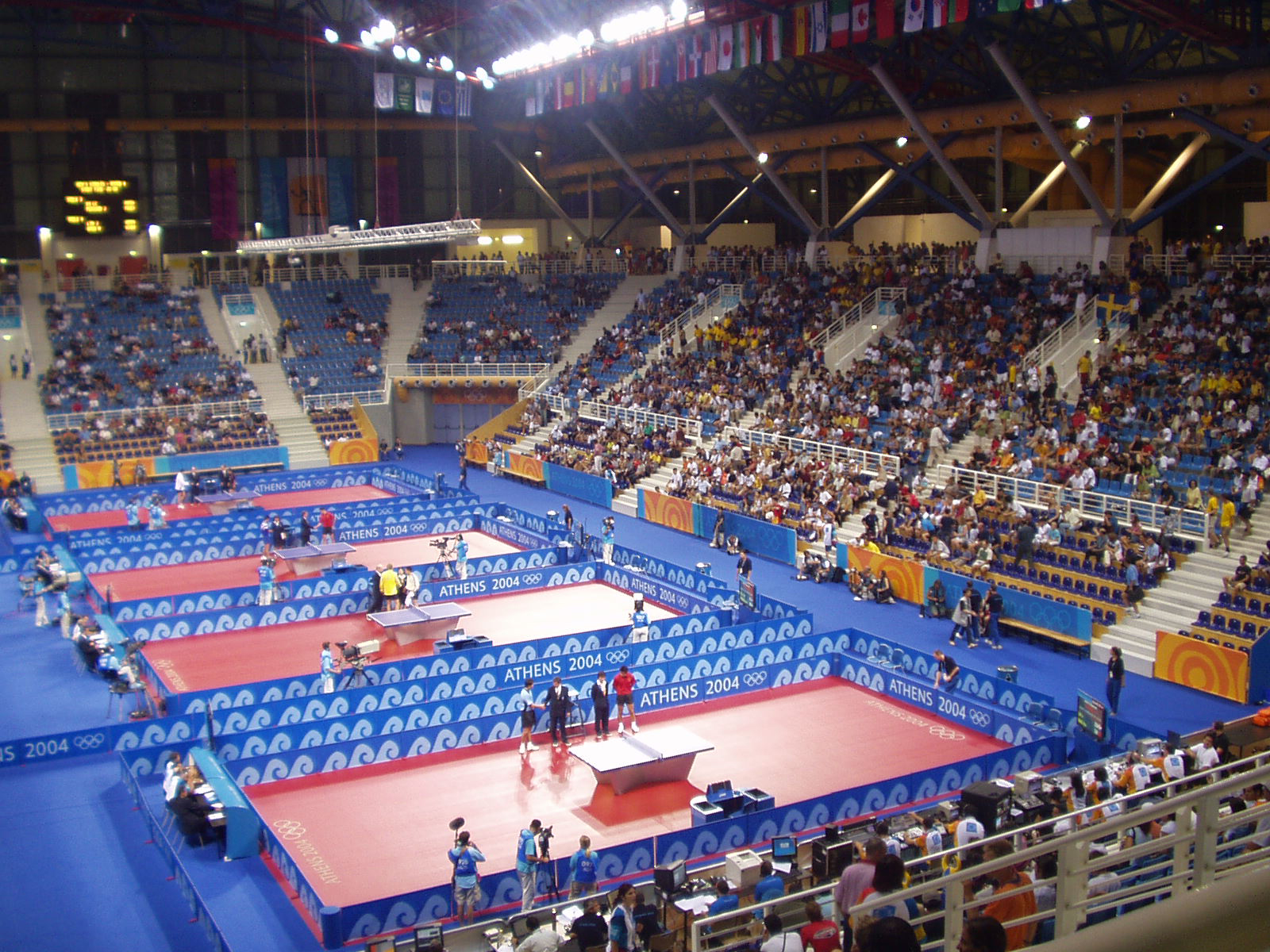
- Interactive map of Galatsi Olympic Hall
- Location: Galatsi, Athens, Greece
- Coordinates: 38°01′38″N 23°45′37″E
- Operator: Municipality of Galatsi
- Capacity: 6,200 (with lower tier seating) (5,141 permanent seating)
- Surface: Parquet
- Public transit: 608 OSY Line, Metro Station Omorfokklisia (2035)

Construction
- Opened: July 30, 2004
- Architect: Alexandros Tombazis

The Galatsi Olympic Hall is a multi-use indoor arena that is located in Galatsi, Athens, Greece. It was the site of table tennis and rhythmic gymnastics at the 2004 Summer Olympics. The Galatsi Olympic Hall has a seating capacity of 6,200, which includes 5,141 permanent seats in the upper tier, and the removable lower tier seats.

== History ==
The arena was completed in May 2004, and officially opened on July 30, 2004, shortly before the beginning of the 2004 Summer Olympic Games. After the 2004 Olympics, Galatsi Olympic Hall served as the home court of the Greek Basketball League club AEK BC, before the team moved to the larger Olympic Indoor Hall in 2006. The arena was then turned over to the private sector (Acropol Haragionis AE and Sonae Sierra SGPS S.A), and was used as a shopping center.

In autumn of 2015, the hall was used as temporary shelter for migrants.

In early 2016, the hall was used for the recording of The X Factor (Greece series 4). In 2017, it was used for the recording of The Voice of Greece (season 3), while it was also once again used for The X Factor (Greece series 5), as well as for the live finale of Survivor Greece 5.

In autumn 2018, Galatsi Olympic Hall was re-established as Christmas Theater, where various artistic and cultural events started taking place.

== See also ==
- List of indoor arenas in Greece
