= Richard Csejtey =

Slovak para table tennis player

Personal information
- Born: 25 July 1979 (age 46) Dunajská Streda, Czechoslovakia
- Home town: Nová Ves, Slovakia
- Height: 170 cm (5 ft 7 in)

Sport
- Country: Slovakia
- Sport: Para table tennis
- Disability: Cerebral palsy
- Disability class: C8
- Club: ŠK Žarnovica/Polstrav Bystričany
- Coached by: Andrej Bardoň; Saša Dragaš
Medal record
Para table tennis
Representing Slovakia
Paralympic Games
Silver medal – second place	2000 Sydney	Men's teams C9
Silver medal – second place	2008 Beijing	Men's teams C6-8
Silver medal – second place	2012 London	Men's singles C8
Bronze medal – third place	2004 Athens	Men's singles C8
World Championships
Gold medal – first place	2002 Taipei	Men's teams C9
Gold medal – first place	2006 Montreux	Men's singles C8
Gold medal – first place	2006 Montreux	Men's teams C8
Bronze medal – third place	1998 Paris	Men's teams C9
European Championships
Gold medal – first place	1999 Piešťany	Men's teams C9
Silver medal – second place	2001 Frankfurt	Men's teams C9
Silver medal – second place	2011 Split	Men's teams C8
Silver medal – second place	2013 Lignano	Men's singles C8
Silver medal – second place	2015 Laško	Men's teams C8
Bronze medal – third place	1997 Stockholm	Men's teams C9
Bronze medal – third place	2005 Jesolo	Men's teams C8
Bronze medal – third place	2009 Genoa	Men's singles C8
Bronze medal – third place	2009 Genoa	Men's teams C8

Richard Csejtey (born 25 July 1979) is a Slovak para table tennis player who was born with cerebral palsy. He has competed in five consecutive Paralympic Games and has won multiple medals in both world and European para table tennis championships.
