= Mathieu Loicq =

Belgian para table tennis player

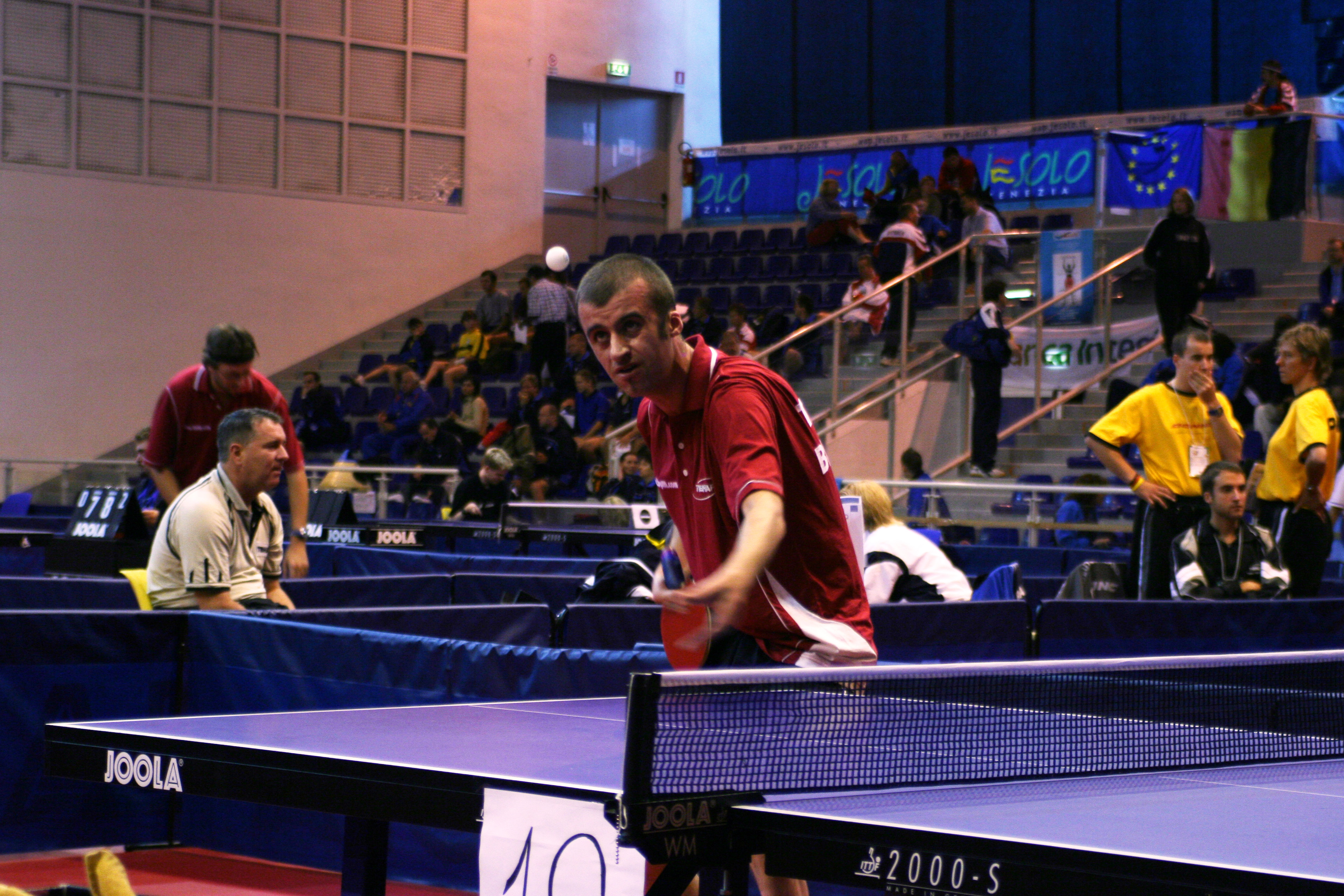

Personal information
- Nickname: Matteo
- Born: 27 June 1979 (age 47) Mouscron, Belgium
- Home town: Hurlus, France
- Height: 180 cm (5 ft 11 in)

Sport
- Country: Belgium
- Sport: Para table tennis
- Disability class: C8
- Coached by: Michel Verhaverbheke
- Retired: 2018
Medal record
Para table tennis
Representing Belgium
Paralympic Games
Gold medal – first place	2004 Athens	Men's singles C8
Gold medal – first place	2004 Athens	Men's teams C8
World Championships
Gold medal – first place	2010 Gwangju	Men's singles C8
Silver medal – second place	2006 Montreux	Men's teams C8
Silver medal – second place	2010 Gwangju	Men's team C8
Bronze medal – third place	2006 Montreux	Men's singles C8
Bronze medal – third place	2014 Beijing	Men's team C8
European Championships
Gold medal – first place	2007 Kranjska Gora	Men's teams C8
Gold medal – first place	2013 Lignano	Men's teams C8
Silver medal – second place	2003 Zagreb	Men's teams C8
Silver medal – second place	2005 Gesolo	Men's teams C8
Silver medal – second place	2009 Genoa	Men's teams C8
Bronze medal – third place	2007 Kranjska Gora	Men's singles C8
Bronze medal – third place	2011 Split	Men's teams C8
Bronze medal – third place	2013 Lignano	Men's singles C8

Mathieu Loicq (born 27 June 1979) is a former Belgian para table tennis player who is a double Paralympic champion, double European champion and a multi-medalist in the world championships, he was born with a deformed left hand and is a right handed player. He was world number one in 2006 and 2009 and retired in 2018.
