= Hong Kong at the 2004 Summer Paralympics =

- IPC code: HKG
- NPC: Hong Kong Sports Association for the Physically Disabled
- Website: www.hksap.org

in Athens
- Competitors: 23 in 5 sports
- Medals Ranked 17th: Gold 11 Silver 7 Bronze 1 Total 19

Summer Paralympics appearances (overview)
- 1972; 1976; 1980; 1984; 1988; 1992; 1996; 2000; 2004; 2008; 2012; 2016; 2020; 2024

Hong Kong competed at the 2004 Summer Paralympics in Athens, Greece. The team included 24 athletes, 15 men and 9 women. Competitors from Hong Kong won 19 medals, including 11 gold, 7 silver and 1 bronze to finish 17th in the medal table.

== Medallists ==
Medal	Name	Sport	Event
Gold	So Wa-wai	Athletics	Men's 200m T36
Gold	Yuk Wing Leung	Boccia	Mixed individual BC4
Gold	Yan Chi Lau; Yuk Wing Leung	Boccia	Mixed pairs BC4
Gold	Ying Ki Fung	Wheelchair fencing	Men's foil individual A
Gold	Charn Hung Hui	Wheelchair fencing	Men's foil individual B
Gold	Charn Hung Hui; Kam Loi Chan; Yan Yun Tai; Ying Ki Fung	Wheelchair fencing	Men's sabre team open
Gold	Chui Yee Yu	Wheelchair fencing	Women's épée individual A
Gold	Chui Yee Yu; Kit Mui Wong; Pui Shan Fan; Yui Chong Chan	Wheelchair fencing	Women's épée team open
Gold	Chui Yee Yu	Wheelchair fencing	Women's foil individual A
Gold	Yui Chong Chan	Wheelchair fencing	Women's foil individual B
Gold	Chui Yee Yu; Kit Mui Wong; Pui Shan Fan; Yui Chong Chan	Wheelchair fencing	Women's foil team open
Silver	Wa Wai So	Athletics	Men's 100m T36
Silver	Wa Wai So	Athletics	Men's 400m T36
Silver	Charn Hung Hui; Kam Loi Chan; Wai Ip Kwong; Ying Ki Fung	Wheelchair fencing	Men's foil team open
Silver	Charn Hung Hui	Wheelchair fencing	Men's sabre individual B
Silver	Pui Shan Fan	Wheelchair fencing	Women's épée individual A
Silver	Yui Chong Chan	Wheelchair fencing	Women's épée individual B
Silver	Pui Shan Fan	Wheelchair fencing	Women's foil individual A
Bronze	Wai Ip Kwong	Wheelchair fencing	Men's épée individual A

== Sports ==
=== Athletics ===
==== Men's track ====
Athlete	Class	Event	Heats		Semifinal		Final	
Athlete	Class	Event	Result	Rank	Result	Rank	Result	Rank
Cheng Yan Keung	T54	100m	15.25	21	did not advance			
So Wa Wai	T36	100m	12.76	4 Q	N/A		12.51	2nd place, silver medalist(s)
So Wa Wai	T36	200m	N/A				25.15 PR	1st place, gold medalist(s)
So Wa Wai	T36	400m	1:01.32	6 Q	N/A		57.52	2nd place, silver medalist(s)

==== Women's track ====
Athlete	Class	Event	Heats		Semifinal		Final	
Athlete	Class	Event	Result	Rank	Result	Rank	Result	Rank
Yu Chun Lai	T36	100m	N/A				15.77	5
Yu Chun Lai	T36	200m	N/A				33.90	6

=== Boccia ===
==== Individual events ====
Athlete	Event	Preliminaries			Round of 16	Quarterfinals	Semifinals	Final	
Athlete	Event	Opponent	Opposition Score	Rank	Opposition Score	Opposition Score	Opposition Score	Opposition Score	Rank
Leung Mei Yee	Mixed individual BC1	Padtong (THA)	L 2-5	4	did not advance				
Leung Mei Yee	Mixed individual BC1	Aandalen (NOR)	L 4-5	4	did not advance				
Leung Mei Yee	Mixed individual BC1	Bak-Pederson (DEN)	L 3-4	4	did not advance				
Leung Mei Yee	Mixed individual BC1	Marques (POR)	W 7-1	4	did not advance				
Leung Mei Yee	Mixed individual BC1	Wilhelmsen (NOR)	W 6-1	4	did not advance				
Loung John	Mixed individual BC2	Curto (ESP)	L 3-9	3	did not advance				
Loung John	Mixed individual BC2	Cortez (ARG)	L 2-4	3	did not advance				
Loung John	Mixed individual BC2	Bourbonniere (CAN)	W 13-0	3	did not advance				
Kwok Hoi Ying	Mixed individual BC2	Ferreira (POR)	W 4-3	4	did not advance				
Kwok Hoi Ying	Mixed individual BC2	Connolly (IRL)	L 3-4	4	did not advance				
Kwok Hoi Ying	Mixed individual BC2	Scalise (ARG)	L 1-4	4	did not advance				
Wong Wing Hong	Mixed individual BC2	Toon (NZL)	L 1-7	4	did not advance				
Wong Wing Hong	Mixed individual BC2	Cordero (ESP)	L 2-5	4	did not advance				
Wong Wing Hong	Mixed individual BC2	Lorenzen (DEN)	L 3-5	4	did not advance				
Lau Yan Chi	Mixed individual BC4	Leung (HKG)	L 3-9	4	did not advance				
Lau Yan Chi	Mixed individual BC4	Streharsky (SVK)	L 1-6	4	did not advance				
Lau Yan Chi	Mixed individual BC4	Durkovic (SVK)	L 6-7	4	did not advance				
Lau Yan Chi	Mixed individual BC4	Gauthier (CAN)	W 12-0	4	did not advance				
Leung Yuk Wing	Mixed individual BC4	Streharsky (SVK)	W 5-3	1 Q	N/A		Dueso (ESP); W 3-2	Valentim (POR); W 5-1	1st place, gold medalist(s)
Leung Yuk Wing	Mixed individual BC4	Durkovic (SVK)	W 8-2	1 Q	N/A		Dueso (ESP); W 3-2	Valentim (POR); W 5-1	1st place, gold medalist(s)
Leung Yuk Wing	Mixed individual BC4	Lau (HKG)	W 9-3	1 Q	N/A		Dueso (ESP); W 3-2	Valentim (POR); W 5-1	1st place, gold medalist(s)
Leung Yuk Wing	Mixed individual BC4	Gauthier (CAN)	W 16-0	1 Q	N/A		Dueso (ESP); W 3-2	Valentim (POR); W 5-1	1st place, gold medalist(s)

==== Pairs/team events ====
Athlete	Event	Preliminaries			Semifinals	Final	
Athlete	Event	Opponent	Opposition Score	Rank	Opposition Score	Opposition Score	Rank
Lau Yan Chi; Leung Yuk Wing	Mixed pairs BC4	de Oliveira Pereira (POR); Valentim (POR)	W 8-5	N/A			1st place, gold medalist(s)
Lau Yan Chi; Leung Yuk Wing	Mixed pairs BC4	Beres (HUN); Gyurkota (HUN)	W 6-3	N/A			1st place, gold medalist(s)
Lau Yan Chi; Leung Yuk Wing	Mixed pairs BC4	Durkovic (SVK); Streharsky (SVK)	W 6-1	N/A			1st place, gold medalist(s)
Lau Yan Chi; Leung Yuk Wing	Mixed pairs BC4	Gomez (ESP); Dueso (ESP)	W 6-3	N/A			1st place, gold medalist(s)
Lau Yan Chi; Leung Yuk Wing	Mixed pairs BC4	Vandervies (CAN); Gauthier (CAN)	W 10-0	N/A			1st place, gold medalist(s)
Leung Mei Yee; Loung John; Kwok Hoi Ying; Wong Wing Hong	Mixed team BC1-2	Portugal (POR)	L 3-4	3	did not advance		
Leung Mei Yee; Loung John; Kwok Hoi Ying; Wong Wing Hong	Mixed team BC1-2	New Zealand (NZL)	L 5-10	3	did not advance		
Leung Mei Yee; Loung John; Kwok Hoi Ying; Wong Wing Hong	Mixed team BC1-2	Ireland (IRL)	W 9-4	3	did not advance		
Leung Mei Yee; Loung John; Kwok Hoi Ying; Wong Wing Hong	Mixed team BC1-2	Thailand (THA)	L 4-5	3	did not advance		
Leung Mei Yee; Loung John; Kwok Hoi Ying; Wong Wing Hong	Mixed team BC1-2	Denmark (DEN)	W 12-2	3	did not advance		

=== Shooting ===
Athlete	Event	Qualification		Final		
Athlete	Event	Score	Rank	Score	Total	Rank
Leung Shui Mai	Women's 10m air rifle standing SH1	367	16	did not advance		

=== Table tennis ===
==== Men ====
Athlete	Event	Preliminaries			Round of 16	Quarterfinals	Semifinals	Final / BM	
Athlete	Event	Opposition Result	Opposition Result	Rank	Opposition Result	Opposition Result	Opposition Result	Opposition Result	Rank
Kwong Kam Shing	Men's singles 5	Durand (FRA); L 0–3	Robertson (GBR); W 3–0	2 Q	Oka (JPN); W 3–0	Urhaug (NOR); W 3-2	Jung (KOR); L 0-3	Durand (FRA); DSQ	4

- Kwong Kam Shing was disqualified for excessive use of prohibited solvents on his rackets. Christophe Durand was awarded the bronze medal for France.

==== Women ====
Athlete	Event	Preliminaries				Quarterfinals	Semifinals	Final / BM	
Athlete	Event	Opposition Result	Opposition Result	Opposition Result	Rank	Opposition Result	Opposition Result	Opposition Result	Rank
Chan Siu Ling	Women's singles 5	Chen (CHN); L 1-3	Palasse (FRA); L 0–3	Hsiao (TPE); W 3–2	4	did not advance			

=== Wheelchair fencing ===
==== Men ====
Athlete	Event	Qualification			Round of 16	Quarterfinal	Semifinal	Final / BM	
Athlete	Event	Opposition	Score	Rank	Opposition Score	Opposition Score	Opposition Score	Opposition Score	Rank
Chan Kam Loi	Men's foil A	Zhang (CHN)	L 0-5	3 Q	Walisiewicz (POL); W 15-13	Pender (POL); L 8-15	did not advance		
Chan Kam Loi	Men's foil A	Makowski (POL)	L 4-5	3 Q	Walisiewicz (POL); W 15-13	Pender (POL); L 8-15	did not advance		
Chan Kam Loi	Men's foil A	van der Wege (USA)	W 5-3	3 Q	Walisiewicz (POL); W 15-13	Pender (POL); L 8-15	did not advance		
Chan Kam Loi	Men's foil A	Fernandez (ESP)	W 5-2	3 Q	Walisiewicz (POL); W 15-13	Pender (POL); L 8-15	did not advance		
Chan Kam Loi	Men's foil A	Khder (IRQ)	W 5-0	3 Q	Walisiewicz (POL); W 15-13	Pender (POL); L 8-15	did not advance		
Chan Kam Loi	Men's sabre A	Makowski (POL)	L 2-5	3 Q	Rodriguez (USA); W 15-11	Makowski (POL); L 9-15	did not advance		
Chan Kam Loi	Men's sabre A	El Assine (FRA)	L 1-5	3 Q	Rodriguez (USA); W 15-11	Makowski (POL); L 9-15	did not advance		
Chan Kam Loi	Men's sabre A	Fernandez (ESP)	L 2-5	3 Q	Rodriguez (USA); W 15-11	Makowski (POL); L 9-15	did not advance		
Chan Kam Loi	Men's sabre A	Doeme (HUN)	W 5-1	3 Q	Rodriguez (USA); W 15-11	Makowski (POL); L 9-15	did not advance		
Chan Kam Loi	Men's sabre A	Khder (IRQ)	W 5-0	3 Q	Rodriguez (USA); W 15-11	Makowski (POL); L 9-15	did not advance		
Chung Thing Ching	Men's épée B	Komar (UKR)	W 5-3	1 Q	N/A	Wong (HKG); L 12-15	did not advance		
Chung Thing Ching	Men's épée B	Park (KOR)	W 5-1	1 Q	N/A	Wong (HKG); L 12-15	did not advance		
Chung Thing Ching	Men's épée B	Sarri (ITA)	W 5-1	1 Q	N/A	Wong (HKG); L 12-15	did not advance		
Chung Thing Ching	Men's épée B	Hisakawa (JPN)	W 5-0	1 Q	N/A	Wong (HKG); L 12-15	did not advance		
Chung Thing Ching	Men's épée B	Soler (ESP)	W 5-1	1 Q	N/A	Wong (HKG); L 12-15	did not advance		
Chung Thing Ching	Men's foil B	Szekeres (HUN)	W 5-4	1 Q	Sarri (ITA); W 15-7	Rodgers (USA); L 10-15	did not advance		
Chung Thing Ching	Men's foil B	Mari (ITA)	W 5-2	1 Q	Sarri (ITA); W 15-7	Rodgers (USA); L 10-15	did not advance		
Chung Thing Ching	Men's foil B	Durand (FRA)	W 5-4	1 Q	Sarri (ITA); W 15-7	Rodgers (USA); L 10-15	did not advance		
Chung Thing Ching	Men's foil B	Arnau (ESP)	W 5-0	1 Q	Sarri (ITA); W 15-7	Rodgers (USA); L 10-15	did not advance		
Fung Ying Ki	Men's foil A	Al Qallaf (KUW)	W 5-3	1 Q	Peppas (GRE); W 15-0	Maillard (FRA); W 15-2	Pender (POL); W 15-9	Zhang (CHN); W 15-12	1st place, gold medalist(s)
Fung Ying Ki	Men's foil A	Walisiewicz (POL)	W 5-1	1 Q	Peppas (GRE); W 15-0	Maillard (FRA); W 15-2	Pender (POL); W 15-9	Zhang (CHN); W 15-12	1st place, gold medalist(s)
Fung Ying Ki	Men's foil A	El Assine (FRA)	W 5-4	1 Q	Peppas (GRE); W 15-0	Maillard (FRA); W 15-2	Pender (POL); W 15-9	Zhang (CHN); W 15-12	1st place, gold medalist(s)
Fung Ying Ki	Men's foil A	Serafini (ITA)	W 5-2	1 Q	Peppas (GRE); W 15-0	Maillard (FRA); W 15-2	Pender (POL); W 15-9	Zhang (CHN); W 15-12	1st place, gold medalist(s)
Fung Ying Ki	Men's foil A	Dulah (MAS)	W 5-1	1 Q	Peppas (GRE); W 15-0	Maillard (FRA); W 15-2	Pender (POL); W 15-9	Zhang (CHN); W 15-12	1st place, gold medalist(s)
Fung Ying Ki	Men's sabre A	Pellegrini (ITA)	L 2-5	2 Q	Serafini (ITA); W 15-2	Jablonski (POL); L 13-15	did not advance		
Fung Ying Ki	Men's sabre A	Rodriguez (USA)	W 5-1	2 Q	Serafini (ITA); W 15-2	Jablonski (POL); L 13-15	did not advance		
Fung Ying Ki	Men's sabre A	Lipinski (GER)	W 5-1	2 Q	Serafini (ITA); W 15-2	Jablonski (POL); L 13-15	did not advance		
Fung Ying Ki	Men's sabre A	Sanchez (ESP)	W 5-1	2 Q	Serafini (ITA); W 15-2	Jablonski (POL); L 13-15	did not advance		
Hui Charn Hung	Men's foil B	Rodgers (USA)	W 5-0	1 Q	Durand (FRA); W 15-10	Alsaedi (KUW); W 15-0	Rodgers (USA); W 15-8	Czop (POL); W 15-11	1st place, gold medalist(s)
Hui Charn Hung	Men's foil B	Shenkevych (UKR)	W 5-3	1 Q	Durand (FRA); W 15-10	Alsaedi (KUW); W 15-0	Rodgers (USA); W 15-8	Czop (POL); W 15-11	1st place, gold medalist(s)
Hui Charn Hung	Men's foil B	Lewonowski (POL)	W 5-2	1 Q	Durand (FRA); W 15-10	Alsaedi (KUW); W 15-0	Rodgers (USA); W 15-8	Czop (POL); W 15-11	1st place, gold medalist(s)
Hui Charn Hung	Men's foil B	Hisakawa (JPN)	W 5-1	1 Q	Durand (FRA); W 15-10	Alsaedi (KUW); W 15-0	Rodgers (USA); W 15-8	Czop (POL); W 15-11	1st place, gold medalist(s)
Hui Charn Hung	Men's sabre B	Czop (POL)	L 2-5	3 Q	Arnau (ESP); W 15-3	Czop (POL); W 15-8	Szekeres (HUN); W 15-8	Wysmierski (POL); L 4-15	2nd place, silver medalist(s)
Hui Charn Hung	Men's sabre B	Mari (ITA)	W 5-1	3 Q	Arnau (ESP); W 15-3	Czop (POL); W 15-8	Szekeres (HUN); W 15-8	Wysmierski (POL); L 4-15	2nd place, silver medalist(s)
Hui Charn Hung	Men's sabre B	Park (KOR)	L 4-5	3 Q	Arnau (ESP); W 15-3	Czop (POL); W 15-8	Szekeres (HUN); W 15-8	Wysmierski (POL); L 4-15	2nd place, silver medalist(s)
Hui Charn Hung	Men's sabre B	Arnau (ESP)	W 5-1	3 Q	Arnau (ESP); W 15-3	Czop (POL); W 15-8	Szekeres (HUN); W 15-8	Wysmierski (POL); L 4-15	2nd place, silver medalist(s)
Hui Charn Hung	Men's sabre B	Moreno (USA)	W 5-3	3 Q	Arnau (ESP); W 15-3	Czop (POL); W 15-8	Szekeres (HUN); W 15-8	Wysmierski (POL); L 4-15	2nd place, silver medalist(s)
Kwong Wai Ip	Men's épée A	Maillard (FRA)	L 3–5	5 Q	Al Qallaf (KUW); W 15-14	Zhang (CHN); W 15–14	More (FRA); L 13-15	Jablonski (POL); W 15–10	3rd place, bronze medalist(s)
Kwong Wai Ip	Men's épée A	Pender (POL)	L 2-5	5 Q	Al Qallaf (KUW); W 15-14	Zhang (CHN); W 15–14	More (FRA); L 13-15	Jablonski (POL); W 15–10	3rd place, bronze medalist(s)
Kwong Wai Ip	Men's épée A	Doeme (HUN)	L 4-5	5 Q	Al Qallaf (KUW); W 15-14	Zhang (CHN); W 15–14	More (FRA); L 13-15	Jablonski (POL); W 15–10	3rd place, bronze medalist(s)
Kwong Wai Ip	Men's épée A	Zhang (CHN)	L 4-5	5 Q	Al Qallaf (KUW); W 15-14	Zhang (CHN); W 15–14	More (FRA); L 13-15	Jablonski (POL); W 15–10	3rd place, bronze medalist(s)
Kwong Wai Ip	Men's épée A	van der Wege (USA)	W 5-3	5 Q	Al Qallaf (KUW); W 15-14	Zhang (CHN); W 15–14	More (FRA); L 13-15	Jablonski (POL); W 15–10	3rd place, bronze medalist(s)
Kwong Wai Ip	Men's foil A	Pender (POL)	L 0-5	2 Q	Pellegrini (ITA); L 8-15	did not advance			
Kwong Wai Ip	Men's foil A	Citerne (FRA)	L 4-5	2 Q	Pellegrini (ITA); L 8-15	did not advance			
Kwong Wai Ip	Men's foil A	Peppas (GRE)	W 5-0	2 Q	Pellegrini (ITA); L 8-15	did not advance			
Kwong Wai Ip	Men's foil A	Rodriguez (USA)	W 5-0	2 Q	Pellegrini (ITA); L 8-15	did not advance			
Tai Yan Yun	Men's épée A	Al Qallaf (KUW)	L 3-5	4 Q	Pender (POL); L 7-15	did not advance			
Tai Yan Yun	Men's épée A	Lipinski (GER)	L 2-5	4 Q	Pender (POL); L 7-15	did not advance			
Tai Yan Yun	Men's épée A	Jablonski (POL)	L 4-5	4 Q	Pender (POL); L 7-15	did not advance			
Tai Yan Yun	Men's épée A	More (FRA)	W 5-4	4 Q	Pender (POL); L 7-15	did not advance			
Tai Yan Yun	Men's épée A	Peppas (GRE)	W 5-1	4 Q	Pender (POL); L 7-15	did not advance			
Tai Yan Yun	Men's épée A	Rodriguez (ESP)	W 5-2	4 Q	Pender (POL); L 7-15	did not advance			
Tai Yan Yun	Men's sabre A	Jablonski (POL)	L 2-5	2 Q	Lipinski (GER); L 13-15	did not advance			
Tai Yan Yun	Men's sabre A	More (FRA)	W 5-4	2 Q	Lipinski (GER); L 13-15	did not advance			
Tai Yan Yun	Men's sabre A	Serafini (ITA)	W 5-0	2 Q	Lipinski (GER); L 13-15	did not advance			
Tai Yan Yun	Men's sabre A	Ahner (GER)	W 5-4	2 Q	Lipinski (GER); L 13-15	did not advance			
Tai Yan Yun	Men's sabre A	Dulah (MAS)	W 5-1	2 Q	Lipinski (GER); L 13-15	did not advance			
Wong Ho Ming	Men's épée B	Mayer (GER)	L 3-5	3 Q	Latreche (FRA); W 15-4	Chung (HKG); W 15-12	Komar (UKR); L 5-15	Rodgers (USA); L 10-15	4
Wong Ho Ming	Men's épée B	Lewonowski (POL)	W 5-4	3 Q	Latreche (FRA); W 15-4	Chung (HKG); W 15-12	Komar (UKR); L 5-15	Rodgers (USA); L 10-15	4
Wong Ho Ming	Men's épée B	Latreche (FRA)	L 3-5	3 Q	Latreche (FRA); W 15-4	Chung (HKG); W 15-12	Komar (UKR); L 5-15	Rodgers (USA); L 10-15	4
Wong Ho Ming	Men's épée B	Alsaedi (KUW)	W 5-4	3 Q	Latreche (FRA); W 15-4	Chung (HKG); W 15-12	Komar (UKR); L 5-15	Rodgers (USA); L 10-15	4
Wong Ho Ming	Men's épée B	Shumate (USA)	W 5-1	3 Q	Latreche (FRA); W 15-4	Chung (HKG); W 15-12	Komar (UKR); L 5-15	Rodgers (USA); L 10-15	4
Wong Ho Ming	Men's foil B	Francois (FRA)	L 3-5	5 Q	Czop (POL); L 9-15	did not advance			
Wong Ho Ming	Men's foil B	Alsaedi (KUW)	L 2-5	5 Q	Czop (POL); L 9-15	did not advance			
Wong Ho Ming	Men's foil B	Hu (CHN)	W 5-3	5 Q	Czop (POL); L 9-15	did not advance			
Wong Ho Ming	Men's foil B	Komar (UKR)	L 1-5	5 Q	Czop (POL); L 9-15	did not advance			

==== Women ====
Athlete	Event	Qualification			Round of 16	Quarterfinal	Semifinal	Final / BM	
Athlete	Event	Opposition	Score	Rank	Opposition Score	Opposition Score	Opposition Score	Opposition Score	Rank
Chan Yui Chong	Women's épée B	Jana (THA)	W 5-3	1 Q	N/A	Weber Kranz (GER); W 15-9	Dani (HUN); W 15-8	Jana (THA); L 13-15	2nd place, silver medalist(s)
Chan Yui Chong	Women's épée B	Palfi (HUN)	W 5-0	1 Q	N/A	Weber Kranz (GER); W 15-9	Dani (HUN); W 15-8	Jana (THA); L 13-15	2nd place, silver medalist(s)
Chan Yui Chong	Women's épée B	Hickey (USA)	W 5-2	1 Q	N/A	Weber Kranz (GER); W 15-9	Dani (HUN); W 15-8	Jana (THA); L 13-15	2nd place, silver medalist(s)
Chan Yui Chong	Women's épée B	Stollwerck (GER)	W 5-2	1 Q	N/A	Weber Kranz (GER); W 15-9	Dani (HUN); W 15-8	Jana (THA); L 13-15	2nd place, silver medalist(s)
Chan Yui Chong	Women's foil B	Hassen Bey (ESP)	W 5-2	1 Q	N/A	Palfi (HUN); W 15-9	Jana (THA); W 15-12	Dani (HUN); W 15-4	1st place, gold medalist(s)
Chan Yui Chong	Women's foil B	Wyrzykowska (POL)	W 5-2	1 Q	N/A	Palfi (HUN); W 15-9	Jana (THA); W 15-12	Dani (HUN); W 15-4	1st place, gold medalist(s)
Chan Yui Chong	Women's foil B	Lykyanenko (UKR)	W 5-1	1 Q	N/A	Palfi (HUN); W 15-9	Jana (THA); W 15-12	Dani (HUN); W 15-4	1st place, gold medalist(s)
Chan Yui Chong	Women's foil B	Masciotra (ARG)	W 5-0	1 Q	N/A	Palfi (HUN); W 15-9	Jana (THA); W 15-12	Dani (HUN); W 15-4	1st place, gold medalist(s)
Fan Pui Shan	Women's épée A	Picot (FRA)	W 5-3	1 Q	N/A	Assmann (FRA); W 15-14	Trigila (ITA); W 15-9	Yu (HKG); L 8-15	2nd place, silver medalist(s)
Fan Pui Shan	Women's épée A	Witos (POL)	W 5-2	1 Q	N/A	Assmann (FRA); W 15-14	Trigila (ITA); W 15-9	Yu (HKG); L 8-15	2nd place, silver medalist(s)
Fan Pui Shan	Women's épée A	Imeri (GER)	W 5-1	1 Q	N/A	Assmann (FRA); W 15-14	Trigila (ITA); W 15-9	Yu (HKG); L 8-15	2nd place, silver medalist(s)
Fan Pui Shan	Women's épée A	Alexander (USA)	W 5-0	1 Q	N/A	Assmann (FRA); W 15-14	Trigila (ITA); W 15-9	Yu (HKG); L 8-15	2nd place, silver medalist(s)
Fan Pui Shan	Women's foil A	Picot (FRA)	W 5-0	1 Q	N/A	Witos (POL); W 15-7	Picot (FRA); W 15-14	Yu (HKG); L 4-15	2nd place, silver medalist(s)
Fan Pui Shan	Women's foil A	Rossek (GER)	W 5-2	1 Q	N/A	Witos (POL); W 15-7	Picot (FRA); W 15-14	Yu (HKG); L 4-15	2nd place, silver medalist(s)
Fan Pui Shan	Women's foil A	Frelik (POL)	W 5-2	1 Q	N/A	Witos (POL); W 15-7	Picot (FRA); W 15-14	Yu (HKG); L 4-15	2nd place, silver medalist(s)
Fan Pui Shan	Women's foil A	Gilmore (USA)	W 5-0	1 Q	N/A	Witos (POL); W 15-7	Picot (FRA); W 15-14	Yu (HKG); L 4-15	2nd place, silver medalist(s)
Fan Pui Shan	Women's foil A	Tani (JPN)	W 5-0	1 Q	N/A	Witos (POL); W 15-7	Picot (FRA); W 15-14	Yu (HKG); L 4-15	2nd place, silver medalist(s)
Wong Kit Mui	Women's épée B	Dani (HUN)	L 3-4	4 Q	Weber Kranz (GER); L 5-15	did not advance			
Wong Kit Mui	Women's épée B	Magnat (FRA)	L 2-5	4 Q	Weber Kranz (GER); L 5-15	did not advance			
Wong Kit Mui	Women's épée B	Weber Kranz (GER)	L 4-5	4 Q	Weber Kranz (GER); L 5-15	did not advance			
Wong Kit Mui	Women's épée B	de Mello (BRA)	W 5-1	4 Q	Weber Kranz (GER); L 5-15	did not advance			
Wong Kit Mui	Women's foil B	Dani (HUN)	L 0-5	4 Q	Palfi (HUN); L 4-15	did not advance			
Wong Kit Mui	Women's foil B	Hickey (USA)	L 3-5	4 Q	Palfi (HUN); L 4-15	did not advance			
Wong Kit Mui	Women's foil B	Stollwerck (GER)	L 1-5	4 Q	Palfi (HUN); L 4-15	did not advance			
Wong Kit Mui	Women's foil B	de Mello (BRA)	W 5-1	4 Q	Palfi (HUN); L 4-15	did not advance			
Yu Chui Yee	Women's épée A	Trigilia (ITA)	L 2–5	2 Q	Meyer (FRA); W 15-5	Picot (FRA); W 15–9	Krajnyak (HUN); W 15–9	Fan (HKG); W 15–8	1st place, gold medalist(s)
Yu Chui Yee	Women's épée A	Rossek (GER)	W 5-0	2 Q	Meyer (FRA); W 15-5	Picot (FRA); W 15–9	Krajnyak (HUN); W 15–9	Fan (HKG); W 15–8	1st place, gold medalist(s)
Yu Chui Yee	Women's épée A	Jurak (HUN)	W 5-1	2 Q	Meyer (FRA); W 15-5	Picot (FRA); W 15–9	Krajnyak (HUN); W 15–9	Fan (HKG); W 15–8	1st place, gold medalist(s)
Yu Chui Yee	Women's épée A	Meyer (FRA)	W 5-2	2 Q	Meyer (FRA); W 15-5	Picot (FRA); W 15–9	Krajnyak (HUN); W 15–9	Fan (HKG); W 15–8	1st place, gold medalist(s)
Yu Chui Yee	Women's épée A	Frelik (POL)	W 5-1	2 Q	Meyer (FRA); W 15-5	Picot (FRA); W 15–9	Krajnyak (HUN); W 15–9	Fan (HKG); W 15–8	1st place, gold medalist(s)
Yu Chui Yee	Women's foil A	Trigilia (ITA)	W 5-3	1 Q	N/A	Rossek (GER); W 15-5	Krajnyak (HUN); W 15-5	Fan (HKG); W 15-4	1st place, gold medalist(s)
Yu Chui Yee	Women's foil A	Witos (POL)	W 5-2	1 Q	N/A	Rossek (GER); W 15-5	Krajnyak (HUN); W 15-5	Fan (HKG); W 15-4	1st place, gold medalist(s)
Yu Chui Yee	Women's foil A	Assmann (FRA)	W 5-1	1 Q	N/A	Rossek (GER); W 15-5	Krajnyak (HUN); W 15-5	Fan (HKG); W 15-4	1st place, gold medalist(s)
Yu Chui Yee	Women's foil A	Presutto (ITA)	W 5-2	1 Q	N/A	Rossek (GER); W 15-5	Krajnyak (HUN); W 15-5	Fan (HKG); W 15-4	1st place, gold medalist(s)
Yu Chui Yee	Women's foil A	Jurak (HUN)	W 5-0	1 Q	N/A	Rossek (GER); W 15-5	Krajnyak (HUN); W 15-5	Fan (HKG); W 15-4	1st place, gold medalist(s)

==== Teams ====
Athlete	Event	Quarterfinal	Semifinal	Final / BM	
Athlete	Event	Opposition Score	Opposition Score	Opposition Score	Rank
Chung Ting Ching; Kwong Wai Ip; Tai Yan Yun; Wong Ho Ming	Men's épée team	United States (USA); W 45–37	France (FRA); L 24–45	China (CHN); L 45–32	4
Chan Kam Loi; Fung Ying Ki; Hui Charn Hung; Kwong Wai Ip	Men's foil team	Spain (ESP); W 45-6	Kuwait (KUW); W 45-42	China (CHN); L 41-45	2nd place, silver medalist(s)
Chan Kam Loi; Fung Ying Ki; Hui Charn Hung; Tai Yan Yun	Men's sabre team	Spain (ESP); W 45-15	Italy (ITA); W 45-38	Poland (POL); W 45-43	1st place, gold medalist(s)
Chan Yui Chong; Fan Pui Shan; Wong Kit Mui; Yu Chui Yee	Women's épée team	Bye	France (FRA); W 45-29	Hungary (HUN); W 45-33	1st place, gold medalist(s)
Chan Yui Chong; Fan Pui Shan; Wong Kit Mui; Yu Chui Yee	Women's foil team	Bye	Poland (POL); W 45-20	Hungary (HUN); W 45-22	1st place, gold medalist(s)

== See also ==
- Hong Kong at the Paralympics
- Hong Kong at the 2004 Summer Olympics
