= Wheelchair fencing at the 2004 Summer Paralympics – Men's foil B =

Wheelchair Fencing - Men's Foil Individual B at the XII Paralympic Games
- Paralympic Wheelchair Fencing
- Venue: Helliniko Fencing Hall
- Dates: 18 September 2004
- Competitors: 20 from 12 nations

Medalists
| 1st place, gold medalist(s) | | Hui Charn Hung | Hong Kong |
| 2nd place, silver medalist(s) | | Piotr Czop | Poland |
| 3rd place, bronze medalist(s) | | Andriy Komar | Ukraine |

The Men's Foil Individual B wheelchair fencing competition at the 2004 Summer Paralympics was held on 18 September at the Helliniko Fencing Hall.

The event was won by Hui Charn Hung, representing Hong Kong.

== Results ==
=== Preliminaries ===
| Qualified for final round |

==== Pool A ====
| Rank | Competitor | MP | W | L | Points | HKG | USA | UKR | POL | JPN |
|---|---|---|---|---|---|---|---|---|---|---|
| 1 | Hui Charn Hung (HKG) | 4 | 4 | 0 | 20:6 | x | 5:0 | 5:3 | 5:2 | 5:1 |
| 2 | John Rodgers (USA) | 4 | 3 | 1 | 15:10 | 0:5 | x | 5:1 | 5:1 | 5:3 |
| 3 | Serhiy Shenkevych (UKR) | 4 | 2 | 2 | 14:12 | 3:5 | 1:5 | x | 5:1 | 5:1 |
| 4 | Grzegorz Lewonowski (POL) | 4 | 1 | 3 | 9:16 | 2:5 | 1:5 | 1:5 | x | 5:1 |
| 5 | Toyoaki Hisakawa (JPN) | 4 | 0 | 4 | 6:20 | 1:5 | 3:5 | 1:5 | 1:5 | x |

==== Pool B ====
| Rank | Competitor | MP | W | L | Points | POL | FRA | USA | ITA | GRE |
|---|---|---|---|---|---|---|---|---|---|---|
| 1 | Piotr Czop (POL) | 4 | 4 | 0 | 20:5 | x | 5:2 | 5:1 | 5:2 | 5:0 |
| 2 | Alim Latreche (FRA) | 4 | 3 | 1 | 17:14 | 2:5 | x | 5:3 | 5:4 | 5:2 |
| 3 | Gerard Moreno (USA) | 4 | 2 | 2 | 14:13 | 1:5 | 3:5 | x | 5:3 | 5:0 |
| 4 | Alessio Sarri (ITA) | 4 | 1 | 3 | 14:15 | 2:5 | 4:5 | 3:5 | x | 5:0 |
| 5 | Emmanouil Bogdos (GRE) | 4 | 0 | 4 | 2:20 | 0:5 | 2:5 | 0:5 | 0:5 | x |

==== Pool C ====
| Rank | Competitor | MP | W | L | Points | FRA | KUW | CHN | UKR | HKG |
|---|---|---|---|---|---|---|---|---|---|---|
| 1 | Laurent Francois (FRA) | 4 | 3 | 1 | 19:13 | x | 5:3 | 4:5 | 5:2 | 5:3 |
| 2 | Abdulwahab Alsaedi (KUW) | 4 | 2 | 2 | 15:13 | 3:5 | x | 2:5 | 5:1 | 5:2 |
| 3 | Hu Dao Liang (CHN) | 4 | 2 | 2 | 17:16 | 5:4 | 5:2 | x | 4:5 | 3:5 |
| 4 | Andriy Komar (UKR) | 4 | 2 | 2 | 13:15 | 2:5 | 1:5 | 5:4 | x | 5:1 |
| 5 | Wong Ho Ming (HKG) | 4 | 1 | 3 | 11:18 | 3:5 | 2:5 | 5:3 | 1:5 | x |

==== Pool D ====
| Rank | Competitor | MP | W | L | Points | HKG | HUN | ITA | FRA | ESP |
|---|---|---|---|---|---|---|---|---|---|---|
| 1 | Chung Ting Ching (HKG) | 4 | 4 | 0 | 20:10 | x | 5:4 | 5:2 | 5:4 | 5:0 |
| 2 | Pál Szekeres (HUN) | 4 | 3 | 1 | 19:9 | 4:5 | x | 5:1 | 5:3 | 5:0 |
| 3 | Gerardo Mari (ITA) | 4 | 2 | 2 | 13:12 | 2:5 | 1:5 | x | 5:2 | 5:0 |
| 4 | Pascal Durand (FRA) | 4 | 1 | 3 | 14:15 | 4:5 | 3:5 | 2:5 | x | 5:0 |
| 5 | Juan Arnau (ESP) | 4 | 0 | 4 | 0:20 | 0:5 | 0:5 | 0:5 | 0:5 | x |

=== Competition bracket ===
First round
Piotr Czop (POL) | 15
Wong Ho Ming (HKG) | 9
Hu Dao Liang (CHN) | 14
Serhiy Shenkevych (UKR) | 15
Laurent Francois (FRA) | 14
Gerardo Mari (ITA) | 15
Andriy Komar (UKR) | 15
Pál Szekeres (HUN) | 11
Chung Ting Ching (HKG) | 15
Alessio Sarri (ITA) | 7
John Rodgers (USA) | 15
Alim Latreche (FRA) | 9
Abdulwahab Alsaedi (KUW) | 15
Gerard Moreno (USA) | 3
Pascal Durand (FRA) | 10
Hui Charn Hung (HKG) | 15

Second round
Piotr Czop (POL) | 15
Serhiy Shenkevych (UKR) | 6
Gerardo Mari (ITA) | 10
Andriy Komar (UKR) | 15
Chung Ting Ching (HKG) | 10
John Rodgers (USA) | 15
Abdulwahab Alsaedi (KUW) | 0
Hui Charn Hung (HKG) | 15

Semifinals
Piotr Czop (POL) | 15
Andriy Komar (UKR) | 10
John Rodgers (USA) | 8
Hui Charn Hung (HKG) | 15

Finals
Piotr Czop (POL) | 11
Hui Charn Hung (HKG) | 15
Third place
John Rodgers (USA) | 11
Andriy Komar (UKR) | 15
