= Hungary at the 2004 Summer Paralympics =

- IPC code: HUN
- NPC: Hungarian Paralympic Committee
- Website: www.hparalimpia.hu

in Athens
- Competitors: 37 in 9 sports
- Medals Ranked 46th: Gold 1 Silver 8 Bronze 10 Total 19

Summer Paralympics appearances (overview)
- 1972; 1976; 1980; 1984; 1988; 1992; 1996; 2000; 2004; 2008; 2012; 2016; 2020; 2024

Hungary competed at the 2004 Summer Paralympics in Athens, Greece. The team included 37 athletes—25 men and 12 women. Hungarian competitors won nineteen medals, one gold, eight silver and ten bronze, to finish 46th in the medal table.

== Medallists ==
Medal	Name	Sport	Event
Gold	Dóra Pásztory	Swimming	Women's 200m individual medley SM8
Silver	Ervin Kovacs	Swimming	Men's 50m butterfly S4
Silver	Ervin Kovacs	Swimming	Men's 50m backstroke S5
Silver	Ervin Kovacs	Swimming	Men's 200m individual medley SM5
Silver	Dóra Pásztory	Swimming	Women's 100m butterfly S8
Silver	Dóra Pásztory	Swimming	Women's 100m backstroke S8
Silver	Gyongyi Dani; Andrea Jurak; Zsuzsanna Krajnyak; Judit Palfi	Wheelchair fencing	Women's épée team open
Silver	Gyongyi Dani	Wheelchair fencing	Women's foil individual B
Silver	Gyongyi Dani; Andrea Jurak; Zsuzsanna Krajnyak; Judit Palfi	Wheelchair fencing	Women's foil team open
Bronze	Deszo Beres; Jozsef Gyurkota	Boccia	Mixed pairs BC4
Bronze	Norbert Biro	Judo	Men's 60kg
Bronze	Gabor Vincze	Judo	Men's 81kg
Bronze	Sandorne Nagy	Judo	Women's 70kg
Bronze	Csaba Szavai	Powerlifting	Men's +100kg
Bronze	Zsolt Vereczkei	Swimming	Men's 50m backstroke S5
Bronze	Katalin Engelhardt	Swimming	Women's 50m butterfly S5
Bronze	Gitta Ráczkó	Swimming	Women's 100m breaststroke SB5
Bronze	Pál Szekeres	Wheelchair fencing	Men's sabre individual B
Bronze	Zsuzsanna Krajnyak	Wheelchair fencing	Women's épée individual A

== Sports ==
=== Athletics ===
==== Men's field ====
Athlete	Class	Event	Final		
Athlete	Class	Event	Result	Points	Rank
Ferenc Horvath	F11	Javelin	NMR		

==== Women's track ====
Athlete	Class	Event	Heats		Semifinal		Final	
Athlete	Class	Event	Result	Rank	Result	Rank	Result	Rank
Krisztina Dora	T54	Marathon	—N/a				2:25:52	14

=== Boccia ===
Athlete	Event	Preliminaries			Round of 16	Quarterfinals	Semifinals	Final	
Athlete	Event	Opponent	Opposition Score	Rank	Opposition Score	Opposition Score	Opposition Score	Opposition Score	Rank
Dezso Beres	Mixed individual BC4	Valentim (POR)	L 0-6	2	did not advance				
Dezso Beres	Mixed individual BC4	Gomez (ESP)	W 6-2	2	did not advance				
Dezso Beres	Mixed individual BC4	Gyurkota (HUN)	W 9-0	2	did not advance				
Dezso Beres	Mixed individual BC4	Chatzipanagiotidou (GRE)	W 7-1	2	did not advance				
Jozsef Gyurkota	Mixed individual BC4	Valentim (POR)	L 3-4	4	did not advance				
Jozsef Gyurkota	Mixed individual BC4	Beres (HUN)	L 0-9	4	did not advance				
Jozsef Gyurkota	Mixed individual BC4	Gomez (ESP)	L 4-9	4	did not advance				
Jozsef Gyurkota	Mixed individual BC4	Chatzipanagiotidou (GRE)	W 7-1	4	did not advance				
Dezso Beres; Jozsef Gyurkota	Pairs BC4	Lau (HKG) / Leung (HKG)	L 3-6	3	—N/a				3rd place, bronze medalist(s)
Dezso Beres; Jozsef Gyurkota	Pairs BC4	de Oliveira Pereira (POR) / Valentim (POR)	W 5-2	3	—N/a				3rd place, bronze medalist(s)
Dezso Beres; Jozsef Gyurkota	Pairs BC4	Durkovic (SVK) / Streharsky (SVK)	L 3-4	3	—N/a				3rd place, bronze medalist(s)
Dezso Beres; Jozsef Gyurkota	Pairs BC4	Gomez (ESP) / Dueso (ESP)	W 5-3	3	—N/a				3rd place, bronze medalist(s)
Dezso Beres; Jozsef Gyurkota	Pairs BC4	Vandervies (CAN) / Gauthier (CAN)	W 5-2	3	—N/a				3rd place, bronze medalist(s)

=== Equestrian ===
Athlete	Event	Total	
Athlete	Event	Score	Rank
Bernadett Andics	Mixed individual championship test grade III	56.880	16
Bernadett Andics	Mixed individual freestyle test grade III	58.278	15

=== Goalball ===
The men's goalball team didn't win any medals; they were 7th out of 12 teams.

==== Players ====
- Szillard Belafi
- Szabolcs Hajba
- Sandor Orsos
- Zsolt Orsos
- Andras Szabo
- Sandor Szell

==== Tournament ====
Game	Match	Score	Rank
1	Hungary vs. Spain (ESP)	2 - 3	4 Q
2	Hungary vs. South Korea (KOR)	5 - 7	4 Q
3	Hungary vs. Finland (FIN)	1 - 2	4 Q
4	Hungary vs. Lithuania (LTU)	6 - 1	4 Q
5	Hungary vs. Slovenia (SLO)	4 - 1	4 Q
Quarterfinals	Hungary vs. Denmark (DEN)	3 - 9	L
Semifinals	Hungary vs. Spain (ESP)	1 - 4	L
7th/8th classification	Hungary vs. South Korea (KOR)	8 - 3	7

=== Judo ===
==== Men ====
Athlete	Event	Preliminary	Quarterfinals	Semifinals	Repechage round 1	Repechage round 2	Final/ Bronze medal contest
Athlete	Event	Opposition Result	Opposition Result	Opposition Result	Opposition Result	Opposition Result	Opposition Result
Norbert Biro	Men's 60kg	Lee (TPE); L 0000-1000	—N/a		Fargeau (FRA); W 0200–0000	Borges (URU); W 1000-0020	Rahmati (IRI); W 0012S-0011 (bronze)
Gabor Vincze	Men's 81kg	Poli (ITA); W 0210-0000	Pominov (UKR); W 1000-0000	Kato (JPN); L 0001-0010	—N/a		Morgan (CAN); W 1000-0100 (bronze)

==== Women ====
Athlete	Event	Quarterfinals	Semifinals	Repechage round 1	Final/ Bronze medal contest
Athlete	Event	Opposition Result	Opposition Result	Opposition Result	Opposition Result
Sandorne Nagy	Women's 70kg	Herrera (ESP); L 0000-0020	—N/a		Bagu (MAS); W 1000-0000 (bronze)

=== Powerlifting ===
==== Men ====
Athlete	Event	Result	Rank
Sandor Sas	90kg	182.5	9
Csaba Szavai	+100kg	210.0	3rd place, bronze medalist(s)

=== Swimming ===
==== Men ====
Athlete	Class	Event	Heats		Final	
Athlete	Class	Event	Result	Rank	Result	Rank
Janos Becsey	S7	50m freestyle	31.98	11	did not advance	
Janos Becsey	SB7	100m breaststroke	1:34.55	9	did not advance	
Janos Becsey	SM7	200m individual medley	2:54.83	6 Q	2:53.69	6
Ervin Kovacs	S5	100m freestyle	1:19.98	3 Q	1:19.43	5
Ervin Kovacs	S5	200m freestyle	2:54.98	3 Q	2:52.99	4
Ervin Kovacs	S5	50m backstroke	39.74	2 Q	40.14	2nd place, silver medalist(s)
Ervin Kovacs	S5	50m butterfly	39.10	2 Q	39.39	2nd place, silver medalist(s)
Ervin Kovacs	SM5	200m individual medley	3:05.39 WR	1 Q	3:06.21	2nd place, silver medalist(s)
Zsolt Vereczkei	S5	50m backstroke	40.86	3 Q	40.49	3rd place, bronze medalist(s)

==== Women ====
Athlete	Class	Event	Heats		Final	
Athlete	Class	Event	Result	Rank	Result	Rank
Katalin Engelhardt	S5	50m backstroke	1:03.06	8 Q	1:04.35	8
Katalin Engelhardt	S5	50m butterfly	—N/a		48.88	3rd place, bronze medalist(s)
Katalin Engelhardt	SB4	100m breaststroke	2:06.33	7 Q	2:08.98	7
Dóra Pásztory	S8	100m backstroke	1:25.59	3 Q	1:24.07	2nd place, silver medalist(s)
Dóra Pásztory	S8	100m butterfly	1:25.27	3 Q	1:23.85	2nd place, silver medalist(s)
Dóra Pásztory	SM8	200m individual medley	2:57.86 WR	1 Q	2:55.01 WR	1st place, gold medalist(s)
Timea Poprocsi	S8	400m freestyle	6:00.98	11	did not advance	
Timea Poprocsi	S8	100m backstroke	1:37.73	10	did not advance	
Timea Poprocsi	SB7	100m breaststroke	1:47.70	5 Q	1:47.01	5
Gitta Raczko	S7	50m butterfly	43.99	9	did not advance	
Gitta Raczko	SB5	100m breaststroke	—N/a		1:55.87	3rd place, bronze medalist(s)
Gitta Raczko	SM7	200m individual medley	3:36.07	8 Q	3:30.02	7
Diana Zambo	S5	50m backstroke	53.81	6 Q	53.45	5
Diana Zambo	S5	50m butterfly	—N/a		49.50	4

=== Table tennis ===
==== Men ====
Athlete	Event	Preliminaries				Quarterfinals	Semifinals	Final / BM	
Athlete	Event	Opposition Result	Opposition Result	Opposition Result	Rank	Opposition Result	Opposition Result	Opposition Result	Rank
Janos Kaiser	Men's singles 1	Lee (KOR); L 0–3	Nikelis (GER); L 1–3	Trujillo Yero (CUB); W 3–2	3	did not advance			
Andras Csonka	Men's singles 8	Frommelt (LIE); L 0-3	Vergeylen (BEL); W 3-2	Pichon (FRA); L 1-3	4	did not advance			
Gyula Zborai	Men's singles 9	Heijnen (NED); W 3-0	Andree (SWE); W 3-0	—N/a	1 Q	Serignat (FRA); W 3-1	Lu (CHN); L 1-3	Leibovitz (USA); L 0-3	4
Dezso Bereczki	Men's singles 10	Ge (CHN); L 0-3	Ruiz (ESP); L 0-3	—N/a	3	did not advance			
Zsolt Bereczki	Men's singles 10	Gaspar (SVK); L 0-3	Andersson (SWE); L 0-3	Puglisi (ITA); L 1-3	4	did not advance			
Dezso Bereczki; Zsolt Bereczki; Andras Csonka; Gyula Zborai	Men's team 10	Czech Republic (CZE); L 0-3	Sweden (SWE); L 1-3	Italy (ITA); W/O	4	did not advance			

=== Wheelchair fencing ===
==== Men ====
Athlete	Event	Qualification			Round of 16	Quarterfinal	Semifinal	Final / BM	
Athlete	Event	Opposition	Score	Rank	Opposition Score	Opposition Score	Opposition Score	Opposition Score	Rank
Istvan Doeme	Men's épée A	Maillard (FRA)	L 3–5	3 Q	Citerne (FRA); L 6-15	did not advance			
Istvan Doeme	Men's épée A	Pender (POL)	L 3-5	3 Q	Citerne (FRA); L 6-15	did not advance			
Istvan Doeme	Men's épée A	Zhang (CHN)	W 5-2	3 Q	Citerne (FRA); L 6-15	did not advance			
Istvan Doeme	Men's épée A	Kwong (HKG)	W 5-4	3 Q	Citerne (FRA); L 6-15	did not advance			
Istvan Doeme	Men's épée A	van der Wege (USA)	W 5-4	3 Q	Citerne (FRA); L 6-15	did not advance			
Istvan Doeme	Men's sabre A	Makowski (POL)	L 0-5	5 Q	Jablonski (POL); L 2-15	did not advance			
Istvan Doeme	Men's sabre A	El Assine (FRA)	L 3-5	5 Q	Jablonski (POL); L 2-15	did not advance			
Istvan Doeme	Men's sabre A	Chan (HKG)	L 1-5	5 Q	Jablonski (POL); L 2-15	did not advance			
Istvan Doeme	Men's sabre A	Fernandez (ESP)	W 5-1	5 Q	Jablonski (POL); L 2-15	did not advance			
Istvan Doeme	Men's sabre A	Khder (IRQ)	L 2-5	5 Q	Jablonski (POL); L 2-15	did not advance			
Pál Szekeres	Men's foil B	Chung (HKG)	L 4-5	2 Q	Komar (UKR); L 11-15	did not advance			
Pál Szekeres	Men's foil B	Mari (ITA)	W 5-1	2 Q	Komar (UKR); L 11-15	did not advance			
Pál Szekeres	Men's foil B	Durand (FRA)	W 5-3	2 Q	Komar (UKR); L 11-15	did not advance			
Pál Szekeres	Men's foil B	Arnau (ESP)	W 5-0	2 Q	Komar (UKR); L 11-15	did not advance			
Pál Szekeres	Men's sabre B	Wysmierski (POL)	L 1-5	4 Q	Bogdos (GRE); W 15-7	Mari (ITA); W 15-14	Hui (HKG); L 8-15	Durans (FRA); W 15-11	3rd place, bronze medalist(s)
Pál Szekeres	Men's sabre B	Durand (FRA)	W 5-3	4 Q	Bogdos (GRE); W 15-7	Mari (ITA); W 15-14	Hui (HKG); L 8-15	Durans (FRA); W 15-11	3rd place, bronze medalist(s)
Pál Szekeres	Men's sabre B	Mayer (GER)	L 2-5	4 Q	Bogdos (GRE); W 15-7	Mari (ITA); W 15-14	Hui (HKG); L 8-15	Durans (FRA); W 15-11	3rd place, bronze medalist(s)
Pál Szekeres	Men's sabre B	Heaton (GBR)	W 5-3	4 Q	Bogdos (GRE); W 15-7	Mari (ITA); W 15-14	Hui (HKG); L 8-15	Durans (FRA); W 15-11	3rd place, bronze medalist(s)
Pál Szekeres	Men's sabre B	Bogdos (GRE)	W 5-1	4 Q	Bogdos (GRE); W 15-7	Mari (ITA); W 15-14	Hui (HKG); L 8-15	Durans (FRA); W 15-11	3rd place, bronze medalist(s)
Pál Szekeres	Men's sabre B	Shumate (USA)	W 5-1	4 Q	Bogdos (GRE); W 15-7	Mari (ITA); W 15-14	Hui (HKG); L 8-15	Durans (FRA); W 15-11	3rd place, bronze medalist(s)

==== Women ====
Athlete	Event	Qualification			Round of 16	Quarterfinal	Semifinal	Final / BM	
Athlete	Event	Opposition	Score	Rank	Opposition Score	Opposition Score	Opposition Score	Opposition Score	Rank
Gyongyi Dani	Women's épée B	Magnat (FRA)	W 5-2	1 Q	Bye	Hassen Bey (ESP); W 15-8	Chan (HKG); L 8-15	Wyrzykowska (POL); L 8-15	4
Gyongyi Dani	Women's épée B	Weber Kranz (GER)	W 5-2	1 Q	Bye	Hassen Bey (ESP); W 15-8	Chan (HKG); L 8-15	Wyrzykowska (POL); L 8-15	4
Gyongyi Dani	Women's épée B	Wong (HKG)	W 4-3	1 Q	Bye	Hassen Bey (ESP); W 15-8	Chan (HKG); L 8-15	Wyrzykowska (POL); L 8-15	4
Gyongyi Dani	Women's épée B	de Mello (BRA)	W 5-0	1 Q	Bye	Hassen Bey (ESP); W 15-8	Chan (HKG); L 8-15	Wyrzykowska (POL); L 8-15	4
Gyongyi Dani	Women's foil B	Hickey (USA)	W 5-0	1 Q	Bye	Magnat (FRA); W 15-2	Hickey (USA); W 15-10	Chan (HKG); L 4-15	2nd place, silver medalist(s)
Gyongyi Dani	Women's foil B	Stollwerck (GER)	W 5-4	1 Q	Bye	Magnat (FRA); W 15-2	Hickey (USA); W 15-10	Chan (HKG); L 4-15	2nd place, silver medalist(s)
Gyongyi Dani	Women's foil B	Wong (HKG)	W 5-0	1 Q	Bye	Magnat (FRA); W 15-2	Hickey (USA); W 15-10	Chan (HKG); L 4-15	2nd place, silver medalist(s)
Gyongyi Dani	Women's foil B	de Mello (BRA)	W 5-0	1 Q	Bye	Magnat (FRA); W 15-2	Hickey (USA); W 15-10	Chan (HKG); L 4-15	2nd place, silver medalist(s)
Andrea Jurak	Women's épée A	Trigilia (ITA)	L 4–5	4 Q	Assmann (FRA); L 12-15	did not advance			
Andrea Jurak	Women's épée A	Yu (HKG)	L 1-5	4 Q	Assmann (FRA); L 12-15	did not advance			
Andrea Jurak	Women's épée A	Rossek (GER)	L 1-5	4 Q	Assmann (FRA); L 12-15	did not advance			
Andrea Jurak	Women's épée A	Meyer (FRA)	W 5-4	4 Q	Assmann (FRA); L 12-15	did not advance			
Andrea Jurak	Women's épée A	Frelik (POL)	W 5-1	4 Q	Assmann (FRA); L 12-15	did not advance			
Andrea Jurak	Women's foil A	Yu (HKG)	L 0-5	6	did not advance				
Andrea Jurak	Women's foil A	Trigilia (ITA)	L 1-5	6	did not advance				
Andrea Jurak	Women's foil A	Witos (POL)	L 2-5	6	did not advance				
Andrea Jurak	Women's foil A	Assmann (FRA)	W 5-4	6	did not advance				
Andrea Jurak	Women's foil A	Presutto (ITA)	L 4-5	6	did not advance				
Zsuzsanna Krajnyak	Women's épée A	Polasik (POL)	W 3-2	1 Q	Bye	Rossek (GER); W 15-11	Yu (HKG); L 9-15	Trigilia (ITA); W 15-8	3rd place, bronze medalist(s)
Zsuzsanna Krajnyak	Women's épée A	Assmann (FRA)	W 5-1	1 Q	Bye	Rossek (GER); W 15-11	Yu (HKG); L 9-15	Trigilia (ITA); W 15-8	3rd place, bronze medalist(s)
Zsuzsanna Krajnyak	Women's épée A	Presutto (ITA)	W 5-0	1 Q	Bye	Rossek (GER); W 15-11	Yu (HKG); L 9-15	Trigilia (ITA); W 15-8	3rd place, bronze medalist(s)
Zsuzsanna Krajnyak	Women's épée A	Gilmore (USA)	W 5-2	1 Q	Bye	Rossek (GER); W 15-11	Yu (HKG); L 9-15	Trigilia (ITA); W 15-8	3rd place, bronze medalist(s)
Zsuzsanna Krajnyak	Women's épée A	Tani (JPN)	W 5-2	1 Q	Bye	Rossek (GER); W 15-11	Yu (HKG); L 9-15	Trigilia (ITA); W 15-8	3rd place, bronze medalist(s)
Zsuzsanna Krajnyak	Women's foil A	Meyer (FRA)	W 5-1	1 Q	Bye	Assmann (FRA); W 15-2	Yu (HKG); L 5-15	Picot (FRA); L 11-15	4
Zsuzsanna Krajnyak	Women's foil A	Polasik (POL)	W 5-1	1 Q	Bye	Assmann (FRA); W 15-2	Yu (HKG); L 5-15	Picot (FRA); L 11-15	4
Zsuzsanna Krajnyak	Women's foil A	Imeri (GER)	W 5-2	1 Q	Bye	Assmann (FRA); W 15-2	Yu (HKG); L 5-15	Picot (FRA); L 11-15	4
Zsuzsanna Krajnyak	Women's foil A	Alexander (USA)	W 5-0	1 Q	Bye	Assmann (FRA); W 15-2	Yu (HKG); L 5-15	Picot (FRA); L 11-15	4
Judit Palfi	Women's épée B	Chan (HKG)	L 0-5	3 Q	Lykyanenko (UKR); W 15-13	Wyrzykowska (POL); L 2-15	did not advance		
Judit Palfi	Women's épée B	Jana (THA)	L 1-5	3 Q	Lykyanenko (UKR); W 15-13	Wyrzykowska (POL); L 2-15	did not advance		
Judit Palfi	Women's épée B	Hickey (USA)	W 5-2	3 Q	Lykyanenko (UKR); W 15-13	Wyrzykowska (POL); L 2-15	did not advance		
Judit Palfi	Women's épée B	Stollwerck (GER)	W 5-2	3 Q	Lykyanenko (UKR); W 15-13	Wyrzykowska (POL); L 2-15	did not advance		
Judit Palfi	Women's foil B	Jana (THA)	L 0-5	2 Q	Wong (HKG); W 15-4	Chan (HKG); L 9-15	did not advance		
Judit Palfi	Women's foil B	Magnat (FRA)	W 5-1	2 Q	Wong (HKG); W 15-4	Chan (HKG); L 9-15	did not advance		
Judit Palfi	Women's foil B	Weber Kranz (GER)	W 5-2	2 Q	Wong (HKG); W 15-4	Chan (HKG); L 9-15	did not advance		
Judit Palfi	Women's foil B	Vettraino (ITA)	W 5-2	2 Q	Wong (HKG); W 15-4	Chan (HKG); L 9-15	did not advance		

==== Teams ====
Athlete	Event	Quarterfinal	Semifinal	Final / BM	
Athlete	Event	Opposition Score	Opposition Score	Opposition Score	Rank
Gyongyi Dani; Andrea Jurak; Zsuzsanna Krajnyak; Judit Palfi	Women's épée team	United States (USA); W 45–19	Poland (POL); W 45–42	Hong Kong (HKG); L 33–45	2nd place, silver medalist(s)
Gyongyi Dani; Andrea Jurak; Zsuzsanna Krajnyak; Judit Palfi	Women's foil team	United States (USA); W 45-16	France (FRA); W 45-44	Hong Kong (HKG); L 22-45	2nd place, silver medalist(s)

== See also ==
- Hungary at the Paralympics
- Hungary at the 2004 Summer Olympics
