= Wheelchair fencing at the 2004 Summer Paralympics – Men's sabre team =

Wheelchair Fencing - Men's Sabre Team at the XII Paralympic Games
- Paralympic Wheelchair Fencing
- Venue: Helliniko Fencing Hall
- Dates: 23 September 2004
- Competitors: 7

Medalists
1st place, gold medalist(s)		Tai Yan Yun; Hui Charn Hung; Fung Ying Ki; Chan Kam Loi	Hong Kong
2nd place, silver medalist(s)		Robert Wysmierski; Stefan Makowski; Arkadiusz Jablonski; Piotr Czop	Poland
3rd place, bronze medalist(s)		Cyril More; Moez El Assine; Pascal Durand	France

The Men's Sabre Team wheelchair fencing competition at the 2004 Summer Paralympics was held on 23 September at the Helliniko Fencing Hall.

The event was won by the team representing Hong Kong.

== Results ==
=== Competition bracket ===
Quarterfinals
Germany	35
France	45
Italy	45
United States	25
Spain	15
Hong Kong	45

Semifinals
Poland	45
France	39
Italy	38
Hong Kong	45

Finals
Poland	43
Hong Kong	45
Third place
France	45
Italy	44

=== Classification 5-7 ===
Semifinal			Fifth place
			1	Germany	45
2	United States	41		Spain	34
3	Spain	45

== Team Lists ==
Spain; Juan Arnau; Jesus Fernandez; Luis Sanchez; Carlos Soler	France; Cyril More; Moez El Assine; Pascal Durand	Germany; Martin Ahner; Wilfried Lipinski; Juergen Mayer	Hong Kong; Tai Yan Yun; Hui Charn Hung; Fung Ying Ki; Chan Kam Loi
Italy; Gerardo Mari; Alberto Pellegrini; Alberto Serafini	Poland; Robert Wysmierski; Stefan Makowski; Arkadiusz Jablonski; Piotr Czop	United States; Gerard Moreno; Mario Rodriguez; Sean Shumate	
