= Wheelchair fencing at the 2004 Summer Paralympics – Women's épée team =

Competition at the 2004 Summer Paralympics

Wheelchair Fencing - Women's Epee Team at the XII Paralympic Games
- Paralympic Wheelchair Fencing
- Venue: Helliniko Fencing Hall
- Dates: 19 September 2004
- Competitors: 7

Medalists
1st place, gold medalist(s)		Chan Yui Chong; Fan Pui Shan; Wong Kit Mui; Yu Chui Yee	Hong Kong
2nd place, silver medalist(s)		Judit Palfi; Zsuzsanna Krajnyak; Andrea Jurak; Gyongyi Dani	Hungary
3rd place, bronze medalist(s)		Emmanuelle Assmann; Sylvie Magnat; Sylviane Meyer; Patricia Picot	France

The Women's Epee Team wheelchair fencing competition at the 2004 Summer Paralympics was held on 19 September at the Helliniko Fencing Hall.

The event was won by the team representing Hong Kong.

== Results ==
=== Competition bracket ===
Quarterfinals
France	45
Italy	35
Poland	45
Germany	39
United States	19
Hungary	45

Semifinals
Hong Kong	45
France	29
Poland	42
Hungary	45

Finals
Hong Kong	45
Hungary	33
Third place
France	45
Poland	42

=== Classification 5-7 ===
Semifinal			Fifth place
			1	Italy	43
2	Germany	45		Germany	45
3	United States	23

== Team Lists ==
France; Emmanuelle Assmann; Sylvie Magnat; Sylviane Meyer; Patricia Picot	Germany; Esther Weber Kranz; Waltraud Stollwerck; Daniela Rossek; Zarife Imeri	Hong Kong; Chan Yui Chong; Fan Pui Shan; Wong Kit Mui; Yu Chui Yee	Hungary; Judit Palfi; Zsuzsanna Krajnyak; Andrea Jurak; Gyongyi Dani
Italy; Laura Presutto; Loredana Trigilia; Rosalba Vettraino	Poland; Marta Wyrzykowska; Dagmara Witos; Jadwiga Polasik; Renata Frelik	United States; Kristine Alexander; Susan Gilmore; Carol Hickey	
