= Wheelchair fencing at the 2004 Summer Paralympics – Men's épée B =

Men's Epee 2004 Summer paralympics

Wheelchair Fencing - Men's Epee Individual B at the XII Paralympic Games
- Paralympic Wheelchair Fencing
- Venue: Helliniko Fencing Hall
- Dates: 20 September 2004
- Competitors: 18 from 13 nations

Medalists
1st place, gold medalist(s)		Andriy Komar	Ukraine
2nd place, silver medalist(s)		Robert Wysmierski	Poland
3rd place, bronze medalist(s)		John Rodgers	United States

The Men's Épée Individual B wheelchair fencing competition at the 2004 Summer Paralympics was held on 20 September at the Helliniko Fencing Hall.

The event was won by Andriy Komar, representing Ukraine.

== Results ==
=== Preliminaries ===
Qualified for final round

==== Pool A ====
Rank	Competitor	MP	W	L	Points	CHN	UKR	USA	POL	FRA	GBR
1	Hu Dao Liang (CHN)	5	5	0	25:12	x	5:1	5:4	5:3	5:2	5:2
2	Serhiy Shenkevych (UKR)	5	4	1	21:17	1:5	x	5:4	5:3	5:2	5:3
3	John Rodgers (USA)	5	3	2	23:17	4:5	4:5	x	5:3	5:2	5:2
4	Robert Wysmierski (POL)	5	2	3	19:19	3:5	3:5	3:5	x	5:2	5:2
5	Laurent Francois (FRA)	5	1	4	13:21	2:5	2:5	2:5	2:5	x	5:1
6	David Heaton (GBR)	5	0	5	10:25	2:5	3:5	2:5	2:5	1:5	x

==== Pool B ====
Rank	Competitor	MP	W	L	Points	GER	POL	HKG	FRA	KUW	USA
1	Juergen Mayer (GER)	5	5	0	25:12	x	5:3	5:4	5:1	5:2	5:2
2	Grzegorz Lewonowski (POL)	5	3	2	22:17	3:5	x	4:5	5:2	5:4	5:1
3	Wong Ho Ming (HKG)	5	3	2	22:19	4:5	5:4	x	3:5	5:4	5:1
4	Alim Latreche (FRA)	5	3	2	18:20	1:5	2:5	5:3	x	5:4	5:3
5	Abdulwahab Alsaedi (KUW)	5	1	4	19:24	2:5	4:5	4:5	4:5	x	5:4
6	Sean Shumate (USA)	5	0	5	11:25	2:5	1:5	1:5	3:5	4:5	x

==== Pool C ====
Rank	Competitor	MP	W	L	Points	HKG	UKR	KOR	ITA	JPN	ESP
1	Chung Ting Ching (HKG)	5	5	0	25:6	x	5:3	5:1	5:1	5:0	5:1
2	Andriy Komar (UKR)	5	4	1	23:12	3:5	x	5:2	5:2	5:2	5:1
3	Park Tae Hoon (KOR)	5	2	3	16:20	1:5	2:5	x	5:3	3:5	5:2
4	Alessio Sarri (ITA)	5	2	3	16:22	1:5	2:5	3:5	x	5:3	5:4
5	Toyoaki Hisakawa (JPN)	5	2	3	15:21	0:5	2:5	5:3	3:5	x	5:3
6	Carlos Soler (ESP)	5	0	5	11:25	1:5	1:5	2:5	4:5	3:5	x

=== Competition bracket ===
Round of 16
Alim Latreche (FRA)	4
Wong Ho Ming (HKG)	15
Serhiy Shenkevych (UKR)	15
Alessio Sarri (ITA)	5
Toyoaki Hisakawa (JPN)	9
Andriy Komar (UKR)	15
Hu Dao Liang (CHN)	15
Abdulwahab Alsaedi (KUW)	11
Park Tae Hoon (KOR)	7
John Rodgers (USA)	15
Grzegorz Lewonowski (POL)	8
Robert Wysmierski (POL)	15

Quarterfinals
Chung Ting Ching (HKG)	12
Wong Ho Ming (HKG)	15
Serhiy Shenkevych (UKR)	10
Andriy Komar (UKR)	15
Hu Dao Liang (CHN)	9
John Rodgers (USA)	15
Robert Wysmierski (POL)	15
Juergen Mayer (GER)	9

Semifinals
Wong Ho Ming (HKG)	5
Andriy Komar (UKR)	15
John Rodgers (USA)	5
Robert Wysmierski (POL)	15

Final
Andriy Komar (UKR)	15
Robert Wysmierski (POL)	9
Third place
Wong Ho Ming (HKG)	10
John Rodgers (USA)	15
