= Wheelchair fencing at the 2004 Summer Paralympics – Men's sabre B =

Wheelchair Fencing - Men's Sabre Individual B at the XII Paralympic Games
- Paralympic Wheelchair Fencing
- Venue: Helliniko Fencing Hall
- Dates: 22 September 2004
- Competitors: 13 from 11 nations

Medalists
1st place, gold medalist(s)		Robert Wysmierski	Poland
2nd place, silver medalist(s)		Hui Charn Hung	Hong Kong
3rd place, bronze medalist(s)		Pál Szekeres	Hungary

The Men's Sabre Individual B wheelchair fencing competition at the 2004 Summer Paralympics was held on 22 September at the Helliniko Fencing Hall.

The event was won by Robert Wysmierski, representing Poland.

== Results ==
=== Preliminaries ===
Qualified for final round

==== Pool A ====
Rank	Competitor	MP	W	L	Points	POL	FRA	GER	HUN	GBR	GRE	USA
1	Robert Wysmierski (POL)	6	6	0	30:8	x	5:2	5:2	5:1	5:1	5:2	5:0
2	Pascal Durand (FRA)	6	4	2	25:20	2:5	x	5:2	3:5	5:4	5:3	5:1
3	Juergen Mayer (GER)	6	4	2	24:19	2:5	2:5	x	5:2	5:3	5:2	5:2
4	Pál Szekeres (HUN)	6	4	2	23:18	1:5	5:3	2:5	x	5:3	5:1	5:1
5	David Heaton (GBR)	6	2	4	21:24	1:5	4:5	3:5	3:5	x	5:1	5:3
6	Emmanouil Bogdos (GRE)	6	1	5	14:26	2:5	3:5	2:5	1:5	1:5	x	5:1
7	Sean Shumate (USA)	6	0	6	8:30	0:5	1:5	2:5	1:5	3:5	1:5	x

==== Pool B ====
Rank	Competitor	MP	W	L	Points	POL	ITA	HKG	KOR	ESP	USA
1	Piotr Czop (POL)	5	4	1	22:11	x	2:5	5:2	5:1	5:1	5:2
2	Gerardo Mari (ITA)	5	4	1	21:16	5:2	x	1:5	5:4	5:1	5:4
3	Hui Charn Hung (HKG)	5	3	2	21:15	2:5	5:1	x	4:5	5:1	5:3
4	Park Tae Hoon (KOR)	5	3	2	20:19	1:5	4:5	5:4	x	5:2	5:3
5	Juan Arnau (ESP)	5	1	4	10:23	1:5	1:5	1:5	2:5	x	5:3
6	Gerard Moreno (USA)	5	0	5	15:25	2:5	4:5	3:5	3:5	3:5	x

=== Competition bracket ===
Round of 16
David Heaton (GBR)	15
Park Tae Hoon (KOR)	12
Emmanouil Bogdos (GRE)	7
Pál Szekeres (HUN)	15
Hui Charn Hung (HKG)	15
Juan Arnau (ESP)	3

Quarterfinals
Robert Wysmierski (POL)	15
David Heaton (GBR)	4
Juergen Mayer (GER)	5
Pascal Durand (FRA)	15
Gerardo Mari (ITA)	14
Pál Szekeres (HUN)	15
Hui Charn Hung (HKG)	15
Piotr Czop (POL)	8

Semifinals
Robert Wysmierski (POL)	15
Pascal Durand (FRA)	5
Pál Szekeres (HUN)	8
Hui Charn Hung (HKG)	15

Final
Robert Wysmierski (POL)	15
Hui Charn Hung (HKG)	4
Third place
Pascal Durand (FRA)	11
Pál Szekeres (HUN)	15
