= Wheelchair fencing at the 2004 Summer Paralympics – Women's foil B =

Wheelchair Fencing - Women's Foil Individual B at the XII Paralympic Games
- Paralympic Wheelchair Fencing
- Venue: Helliniko Fencing Hall
- Dates: 20 September 2004
- Competitors: 15 from 12 nations

Medalists
1st place, gold medalist(s)		Chan Yui Chong	Hong Kong
2nd place, silver medalist(s)		Gyongyi Dani	Hungary
3rd place, bronze medalist(s)		Saysunee Jana	Thailand

The Women's Foil Individual B wheelchair fencing competition at the 2004 Summer Paralympics was held on 20 September at the Helliniko Fencing Hall.

The event was won by Chan Yui Chong, representing Hong Kong.

== Results ==
=== Preliminaries ===
Qualified for final round

==== Pool A ====
Rank	Competitor	MP	W	L	Points	HKG	ESP	POL	UKR	ARG
1	Chan Yui Chong (HKG)	4	4	0	20:5	x	5:2	5:2	5:1	5:0
2	Gema Victoria Hassen Bey (ESP)	4	3	1	17:9	2:5	x	5:3	5:1	5:0
3	Marta Wyrzykowska (POL)	4	2	2	15:10	2:5	3:5	x	5:0	5:0
4	Iryna Lykyanenko (UKR)	4	1	3	7:18	1:5	1:5	0:5	x	5:3
5	Susana Masciotra (ARG)	4	0	4	3:20	0:5	0:5	0:5	3:5	x

==== Pool B ====
Rank	Competitor	MP	W	L	Points	HUN	USA	GER	HKG	BRA
1	Gyongyi Dani (HUN)	4	4	0	20:4	x	5:0	5:4	5:0	5:0
2	Carol Hickey (USA)	4	3	1	15:10	0:5	x	5:2	5:3	5:0
3	Waltraud Stollwerck (GER)	4	2	2	16:13	4:5	2:5	x	5:1	5:2
4	Wong Kit Mui (HKG)	4	1	3	9:16	0:5	3:5	1:5	x	5:1
5	Andrea de Mello (BRA)	4	0	4	3:20	0:5	0:5	2:5	1:5	x

==== Pool C ====
Rank	Competitor	MP	W	L	Points	THA	HUN	FRA	GER	ITA
1	Saysunee Jana (THA)	4	4	0	20:4	x	5:0	5:0	5:2	5:2
2	Judit Palfi (HUN)	4	3	1	15:11	0:5	x	5:1	5:4	5:1
3	Sylvie Magnat (FRA)	4	2	2	11:13	0:5	1:5	x	5:2	5:1
4	Esther Weber Kranz (GER)	4	1	3	13:19	2:5	4:5	2:5	x	5:4
5	Rosalba Vettraino (ITA)	4	0	4	8:20	2:5	1:5	1:5	4:5	x

=== Competition bracket ===
Round of 16
Wong Kit Mui (HKG)	4
Judit Palfi (HUN)	15
Marta Wyrzykowska (POL)	15
Esther Weber Kranz (GER)	7
Sylvie Magnat (FRA)	15
Waltraud Stollwerck (GER)	12

Quarterfinals
Chan Yui Chong (HKG)	15
Judit Palfi (HUN)	9
Marta Wyrzykowska (POL)	7
Saysunee Jana (THA)	15
Gyongyi Dani (HUN)	15
Sylvie Magnat (FRA)	2
Carol Hickey (USA)	15
Gema Victoria Hassen Bey (ESP)	3

Semifinals
Chan Yui Chong (HKG)	15
Saysunee Jana (THA)	12
Gyongyi Dani (HUN)	15
Carol Hickey (USA)	10

Final
Chan Yui Chong (HKG)	15
Gyongyi Dani (HUN)	4
Third place
Carol Hickey (USA)	5
Saysunee Jana (THA)	15
