= Wheelchair fencing at the 2004 Summer Paralympics – Men's sabre A =

Wheelchair Fencing - Men's Sabre Individual A at the XII Paralympic Games
- Paralympic Wheelchair Fencing
- Venue: Helliniko Fencing Hall
- Dates: 22 September 2004
- Competitors: 17 from 10 nations

Medalists
1st place, gold medalist(s)		Alberto Pellegrini	Italy
2nd place, silver medalist(s)		Stefan Makowski	Poland
3rd place, bronze medalist(s)		Arkadiusz Jablonski	Poland

The Men's Sabre Individual A wheelchair fencing competition at the 2004 Summer Paralympics was held on 22 September at the Helliniko Fencing Hall.

The event was won by Alberto Pellegrini, representing Italy.

== Results ==
=== Preliminaries ===
Qualified for final round

==== Pool A ====
Rank	Competitor	MP	W	L	Points	POL	HKG	FRA	ITA	GER	MAS
1	Arkadiusz Jablonski (POL)	5	5	0	25:12	x	5:2	5:4	5:1	5:4	5:1
2	Tai Yan Yun (HKG)	5	4	1	22:15	2:5	x	5:4	5:0	5:3	5:3
3	Cyril More (FRA)	5	3	2	23:17	4:5	4:5	x	5:1	5:3	5:3
4	Alberto Serafini (ITA)	5	2	3	12:19	1:5	0:5	1:5	x	5:2	5:2
5	Martin Ahner (GER)	5	1	4	17:22	4:5	3:5	3:5	2:5	x	5:2
6	Hamzah Dulah (MAS)	5	0	5	11:25	1:5	3:5	3:5	2:5	2:5	x

==== Pool B ====
Rank	Competitor	MP	W	L	Points	POL	FRA	HKG	ESP	HUN	IRQ
1	Stefan Makowski (POL)	5	5	0	25:10	x	5:3	5:2	5:4	5:0	5:1
2	Moez El Assine (FRA)	5	4	1	23:10	3:5	x	5:1	5:0	5:3	5:1
3	Chan Kam Loi (HKG)	5	2	3	15:16	2:5	1:5	x	2:5	5:1	5:0
4	Jesus Fernandez (ESP)	5	2	3	15:19	4:5	0:5	5:2	x	1:5	5:2
5	Istvan Doeme (HUN)	5	1	4	11:21	0:5	3:5	1:5	5:1	x	2:5
6	Kaled Khder (IRQ)	5	1	4	9:22	1:5	1:5	0:5	2:5	5:2	x

==== Pool C ====
Rank	Competitor	MP	W	L	Points	ITA	HKG	USA	GER	ESP
1	Alberto Pellegrini (ITA)	4	4	0	20:5	x	5:2	5:1	5:1	5:1
2	Fung Ying Ki (HKG)	4	3	1	17:8	2:5	x	5:1	5:1	5:1
3	Mario Rodriguez (USA)	4	2	2	12:16	1:5	1:5	x	5:4	5:2
4	Wilfried Lipinski (GER)	4	1	3	11:15	1:5	1:5	4:5	x	5:0
5	Luis Sanchez (ESP)	4	0	4	4:20	1:5	1:5	2:5	0:5	x

=== Competition bracket ===
Round of 16
Chan Kam Loi (HKG)	15
Mario Rodriguez (USA)	11
Tai Yan Yun (HKG)	13
Wilfried Lipinski (GER)	15
Martin Ahner (GER)	1
Moez El Assine (FRA)	15
Arkadiusz Jablonski (POL)	15
Istvan Doeme (HUN)	2
Alberto Serafini (ITA)	2
Fung Ying Ki (HKG)	15
Cyril More (FRA)	15
Jesus Fernandez (ESP)	8

Quarterfinals
Stefan Makowski (POL)	15
Chan Kam Loi (HKG)	9
Wilfried Lipinski (GER)	8
Moez El Assine (FRA)	15
Arkadiusz Jablonski (POL)	15
Fung Ying Ki (HKG)	13
Cyril More (FRA)	7
Alberto Pellegrini (ITA)	15

Semifinals
Stefan Makowski (POL)	15
Moez El Assine (FRA)	7
Arkadiusz Jablonski (POL)	12
Alberto Pellegrini (ITA)	15

Final
Stefan Makowski (POL)	12
Alberto Pellegrini (ITA)	15
Third place
Moez El Assine (FRA)	7
Arkadiusz Jablonski (POL)	15
