= Wheelchair fencing at the 2004 Summer Paralympics – Men's épée team =

Wheelchair Fencing - Men's Epee Team at the XII Paralympic Games
- Paralympic Wheelchair Fencing
- Venue: Helliniko Fencing Hall
- Dates: 21 September 2004
- Competitors: 8

Medalists
1st place, gold medalist(s)		Cyril More; David Maillard; Alim Latreche; Robert Citerne	France
2nd place, silver medalist(s)		Robert Wysmierski; Radoslaw Stanczuk; Dariusz Pender; Arkadiusz Jablonski	Poland
3rd place, bronze medalist(s)		Hu Daoliang; Zhang Chong; Zhang Lei	China

The Men's Epee Team wheelchair fencing competition at the 2004 Summer Paralympics was held on 21 September at the Helliniko Fencing Hall.

The event was won by the team representing France.

== Results ==
=== Competition bracket ===
Quarterfinals
Poland	W/O
Spain
China	45
Germany	38
Hong Kong	45
United States	37
Kuwait	39
France	45

Semifinals
Poland	45
China	34
Hong Kong	24
France	45

Finals
Poland	43
France	45
Third place
China	45
Hong Kong	32

=== Classification 5-7 ===
Semifinal			Fifth place
			1	Germany	39
2	United States	24		Kuwait	45
3	Kuwait	45

== Team Lists ==
China; Hu Daoliang; Zhang Chong; Zhang Lei	Spain; Alejandro Rodriguez; Luis Sanchez; Carlos Soler	France; Cyril More; David Maillard; Alim Latreche; Robert Citerne	Germany; Martin Ahner; Wilfried Lipinski; Juergen Mayer
Hong Kong; Wong Ho Ming; Tai Yan Yun; Kwong Wai Ip; Chung Ting Ching	Kuwait; Mohammad Almansouri; Tariq Al Qallaf; Abdulwahab Alsaedi	Poland; Robert Wysmierski; Radoslaw Stanczuk; Dariusz Pender; Arkadiusz Jablonski	United States; John Rodgers; Sean Shumate; Gary van der Wege
