= Hisakawa =

Hisakawa (written: 久川) is a Japanese surname. Notable people with the surname include:

- Aya Hisakawa (久川 綾, born 1968), Japanese voice actress and singer
- Toyoaki Hisakawa (久川 豊昌), Japanese wheelchair fencer

== Fictional Characters ==
- Hayate Hisakawa (久川 颯), a character from The Idolmaster Cinderella Girls
- Nagi Hisakawa (久川 凪), a character from The Idolmaster Cinderella Girls
- Tetsudo "Poppo" Hisakawa (久川 鉄道), a character from Anohana: The Flower We Saw That Day
