= Wheelchair fencing at the 2004 Summer Paralympics – Women's épée A =

Wheelchair Fencing - Women's Epee Individual A at the XII Paralympic Games
- Paralympic Wheelchair Fencing
- Venue: Helliniko Fencing Hall
- Dates: 18 September 2004
- Competitors: 17 from 8 nations

Medalists
1st place, gold medalist(s)		Yu Chui Yee	Hong Kong
2nd place, silver medalist(s)		Fan Pui Shan	Hong Kong
3rd place, bronze medalist(s)		Zsuzsanna Krajnyak	Hungary

The Women's Epee Individual A wheelchair fencing competition at the 2004 Summer Paralympics was held on 18 September at the Helliniko Fencing Hall.

The event was won by Yu Chui Yee, representing Hong Kong.

== Results ==
=== Preliminaries ===
Qualified for final round

==== Pool A ====
Rank	Competitor	MP	W	L	Points	ITA	HKG	GER	HUN	FRA	POL
1	Loredana Trigilia (ITA)	5	5	0	25:13	x	5:2	5:4	5:4	5:2	5:1
2	Yu Chui Yee (HKG)	5	4	1	22:9	2:5	x	5:0	5:1	5:2	5:1
3	Daniela Rossek (GER)	5	3	2	19:17	4:5	0:5	x	5:1	5:4	5:2
4	Andrea Jurak (HUN)	5	2	3	16:20	4:5	1:5	1:5	x	5:4	5:1
5	Sylviane Meyer (FRA)	5	1	4	17:22	2:5	2:5	4:5	4:5	x	5:2
6	Renata Frelik (POL)	5	0	5	7:25	1:5	1:5	2:5	1:5	2:5	x

==== Pool B ====
Rank	Competitor	MP	W	L	Points	HUN	POL	FRA	ITA	USA	JPN
1	Zsuzsanna Krajnyak (HUN)	5	5	0	23:7	x	3:2	5:1	5:0	5:2	5:2
2	Jadwiga Polasik (POL)	5	3	2	20:15	2:3	x	5:3	5:1	5:3	3:5
3	Emmanuelle Assmann (FRA)	5	3	2	16:13	1:5	3:5	x	5:2	2:0	5:1
4	Laura Presutto (ITA)	5	2	3	13:18	0:5	1:5	2:5	x	5:3	5:0
5	Susan Gilmore (USA)	5	1	4	13:21	2:5	3:5	0:2	3:5	x	5:4
6	Tomoko Tani (JPN)	5	1	4	12:23	2:5	5:3	1:5	0:5	4:5	x

==== Pool C ====
Rank	Competitor	MP	W	L	Points	HKG	FRA	POL	GER	USA
1	Fan Pui Shan (HKG)	4	4	0	20:6	x	5:3	5:2	5:1	5:0
2	Patricia Picot (FRA)	4	3	1	18:13	3:5	x	5:4	5:4	5:0
3	Dagmara Witos (POL)	4	2	2	16:13	2:5	4:5	x	5:0	5:3
4	Zarife Imeri (GER)	4	1	3	10:18	1:5	4:5	0:5	x	5:3
5	Kristine Alexander (USA)	4	0	4	6:20	0:5	0:5	3:5	3:5	x

=== Competition bracket ===
Round of 16
Dagmara Witos (POL)	11
Daniela Rossek (GER)	15
Patricia Picot (FRA)	15
Zarife Imeri (GER)	8
Sylviane Meyer (FRA)	5
Yu Chui Yee (HKG)	15
Loredana Trigilia (ITA)	15
Susan Gilmore (USA)	13
Laura Presutto (ITA)	6
Jadwiga Polasik (POL)	15
Emmanuelle Assmann (FRA)	15
Andrea Jurak (HUN)	12

Quarterfinals
Zsuzsanna Krajnyak (HUN)	15
Daniela Rossek (GER)	11
Patricia Picot (FRA)	9
Yu Chui Yee (HKG)	15
Loredana Trigilia (ITA)	15
Jadwiga Polasik (POL)	12
Emmanuelle Assmann (FRA)	14
Fan Pui Shan (HKG)	15

Semifinals
Zsuzsanna Krajnyak (HUN)	9
Yu Chui Yee (HKG)	15
Loredana Trigilia (ITA)	9
Fan Pui Shan (HKG)	15

Final
Yu Chui Yee (HKG)	15
Fan Pui Shan (HKG)	8
Third place
Zsuzsanna Krajnyak (HUN)	15
Loredana Trigilia (ITA)	8
