= Wheelchair fencing at the 2004 Summer Paralympics – Women's foil A =

Wheelchair Fencing - Women's Foil Individual A at the XII Paralympic Games
- Paralympic Wheelchair Fencing
- Venue: Helliniko Fencing Hall
- Dates: 20 September 2004
- Competitors: 17 from 8 nations

Medalists
1st place, gold medalist(s)		Yu Chui Yee	Hong Kong
2nd place, silver medalist(s)		Fan Pui Shan	Hong Kong
3rd place, bronze medalist(s)		Patricia Picot	France

The Women's Foil Individual A wheelchair fencing competition at the 2004 Summer Paralympics was held on 20 September at the Helliniko Fencing Hall.

The event was won by Yu Chui Yee, representing Hong Kong.

== Results ==
=== Preliminaries ===
Qualified for final round

==== Pool A ====
Rank	Competitor	MP	W	L	Points	HKG	FRA	GER	POL	USA	JPN
1	Fan Pui Shan (HKG)	5	5	0	25:4	x	5:0	5:2	5:2	5:0	5:0
2	Patricia Picot (FRA)	5	4	1	20:10	0:5	x	5:3	5:1	5:0	5:1
3	Daniela Rossek (GER)	5	3	2	20:16	2:5	3:5	x	5:0	5:4	5:2
4	Renata Frelik (POL)	5	1	4	10:21	2:5	1:5	0:5	x	2:5	5:1
5	Susan Gilmore (USA)	5	1	4	10:22	0:5	0:5	4:5	5:2	x	1:5
6	Tomoko Tani (JPN)	5	1	4	9:21	0:5	1:5	2:5	1:5	5:1	x

==== Pool B ====
Rank	Competitor	MP	W	L	Points	HKG	ITA	POL	FRA	ITA	HUN
1	Yu Chui Yee (HKG)	5	5	0	25:8	x	5:3	5:2	5:1	5:2	5:0
2	Loredana Trigilia (ITA)	5	4	1	23:8	3:5	x	5:0	5:2	5:0	5:1
3	Dagmara Witos (POL)	5	3	2	17:18	2:5	0:5	x	5:4	5:2	5:2
4	Emmanuelle Assmann (FRA)	5	1	4	16:24	1:5	2:5	4:5	x	5:4	4:5
5	Laura Presutto (ITA)	5	1	4	13:24	2:5	0:5	2:5	4:5	x	5:4
6	Andrea Jurak (HUN)	5	1	4	12:24	0:5	1:5	2:5	5:4	4:5	x

==== Pool C ====
Rank	Competitor	MP	W	L	Points	HUN	FRA	POL	GER	USA
1	Zsuzsanna Krajnyak (HUN)	4	4	0	20:4	x	5:1	5:1	5:2	5:0
2	Sylviane Meyer (FRA)	4	3	1	16:8	1:5	x	5:2	5:0	5:1
3	Jadwiga Polasik (POL)	4	2	2	13:12	1:5	2:5	x	5:2	5:0
4	Zarife Imeri (GER)	4	1	3	9:18	2:5	0:5	2:5	x	5:3
5	Kristine Alexander (USA)	4	0	4	4:20	0:5	1:5	0:5	3:5	x

=== Competition bracket ===
Round of 16
Jadwiga Polasik (POL)	11
Dagmara Witos (POL)	15
Patricia Picot (FRA)	15
Laura Presutto (ITA)	5
Renata Frelik (POL)	4
Loredana Trigilia (ITA)	15
Emmanuelle Assmann (FRA)	15
Sylviane Meyer (FRA)	9
Daniela Rossek (GER)	15
Zarife Imeri (GER)	4

Quarterfinals
Fan Pui Shan (HKG)	15
Dagmara Witos (POL)	7
Patricia Picot (FRA)	15
Loredana Trigilia (ITA)	14
Zsuzsanna Krajnyak (HUN)	15
Emmanuelle Assmann (FRA)	2
Daniela Rossek (GER)	5
Yu Chui Yee (HKG)	15

Semifinals
Fan Pui Shan (HKG)	15
Patricia Picot (FRA)	14
Zsuzsanna Krajnyak (HUN)	5
Yu Chui Yee (HKG)	15

Final
Fan Pui Shan (HKG)	4
Yu Chui Yee (HKG)	15
Third place
Patricia Picot (FRA)	15
Zsuzsanna Krajnyak (HUN)	11
