= Boccia at the 2004 Summer Paralympics – Pairs BC4 =

International sporting competition

Boccia - Mixed Pairs BC4 at the XII Paralympic Games
- Paralympic Boccia
- Venue: Ano Liosia Olympic Hall
- Dates: 26–28 September 2004
- Competitors: 6 from 6 nations

Medalists
1st place, gold medalist(s)		Lau Yan Chi; Leung Yuk Wing	Hong Kong
2nd place, silver medalist(s)		Fernando de Oliveira Pereira; Bruno Valentim	Portugal
3rd place, bronze medalist(s)		Dezso Beres; Jozsef Gyurkota	Hungary

The Mixed Pairs BC4 boccia competition at the 2004 Summer Paralympics was held from 26 to 28 September at the Ano Liosia Olympic Hall.

This class consisted of a single round-robin pool only, with no knock-out phase. The event was won by Lau Yan Chi and Leung Yuk Wing, representing Hong Kong.

== Results ==
=== Final Round ===
==== Pool W ====
Rank	Competitor	MP	W	L	Points	HKG	HUN	POR	SVK	ESP	CAN
1st place, gold medalist(s)	Lau Yan Chi (HKG); Leung Yuk Wing (HKG)	5	5	0	36:12	x	8:5	6:3	6:1	6:3	10:0
2nd place, silver medalist(s)	Fernando de Oliveira Pereira (POR); Bruno Valentim (POR)	5	3	2	30:18	5:8	x	2:5	8:2	6:3	9:0
3rd place, bronze medalist(s)	Dezso Beres (HUN); Jozsef Gyurkota (HUN)	5	3	2	20:17	3:6	5:2	x	3:4	5:3	4:2
4	Robert Durkovic (SVK); Martin Streharsky (SVK)	5	3	2	17:21	1:6	2:8	4:3	x	5:2	5:2
5	Jose Vicente Gomez (ESP); Jose Maria Dueso (ESP)	5	1	4	18:23	3:6	3:6	3:5	2:5	x	7:1
6	Josh Vandervies (CAN); Daniel Gauthier (CAN)	5	0	5	5:35	0:10	0:9	2:4	2:5	1:7	x
