= Boccia at the 2004 Summer Paralympics – Individual BC4 =

Boccia - Mixed Individual BC4 at the XII Paralympic Games
- Paralympic Boccia
- Venue: Ano Liosia Olympic Hall
- Dates: 23–26 September
- Competitors: 15 from 8 nations

Medalists
| 1st place, gold medalist(s) | | Leung Yuk Wing | Hong Kong |
| 2nd place, silver medalist(s) | | Bruno Valentim | Portugal |
| 3rd place, bronze medalist(s) | | Jose Maria Dueso | Spain |

The Mixed Individual BC4 boccia competition at the 2004 Summer Paralympics was held from 23 to 26 September at the Ano Liosia Olympic Hall.

The event was won by Leung Yuk Wing, representing Hong Kong.

== Results ==
=== Preliminaries ===
==== Pool P ====
| Rank | Competitor | MP | W | L | Points | POR | HUN | ESP | HUN | GRE |
|---|---|---|---|---|---|---|---|---|---|---|
| 1 | Bruno Valentim (POR) | 4 | 4 | 0 | 29:4 | x | 6:0 | 9:0 | 4:3 | 10:1 |
| 2 | Dezso Beres (HUN) | 4 | 3 | 1 | 22:9 | 0:6 | x | 6:2 | 9:0 | 7:1 |
| 3 | Jose Vicente Gomez (ESP) | 4 | 2 | 2 | 16:21 | 0:9 | 2:6 | x | 9:4 | 5:2 |
| 4 | Jozsef Gyurkota (HUN) | 4 | 1 | 3 | 14:23 | 3:4 | 0:9 | 4:9 | x | 7:1 |
| 5 | Anastasia Chatzipanagiotidou (GRE) | 4 | 0 | 4 | 5:29 | 1:10 | 1:7 | 2:5 | 1:7 | x |

==== Pool Q ====
| Rank | Competitor | MP | W | L | Points | ESP | POR | GRE | CAN | ARG |
|---|---|---|---|---|---|---|---|---|---|---|
| 1 | Jose Maria Dueso (ESP) | 4 | 3 | 1 | 24:8 | x | 3:5 | 10:1 | 6:1 | 5:1 |
| 2 | Fernando de Oliveira Pereira (POR) | 4 | 3 | 1 | 21:15 | 5:3 | x | 10:3 | 3:7 | 3:2 |
| 3 | Emmanouil Mourtos (GRE) | 4 | 2 | 2 | 17:24 | 1:10 | 3:10 | x | 4:3 | 9:1 |
| 4 | Josh Vandervies (CAN) | 4 | 1 | 3 | 13:20 | 1:6 | 7:3 | 3:4 | x | 2:7 |
| 5 | Vanina Ledesma (ARG) | 4 | 1 | 3 | 11:19 | 1:5 | 2:3 | 1:9 | 7:2 | x |

==== Pool R ====
| Rank | Competitor | MP | W | L | Points | HKG | SVK | SVK | HKG | CAN |
|---|---|---|---|---|---|---|---|---|---|---|
| 1 | Leung Yuk Wing (HKG) | 4 | 4 | 0 | 38:8 | x | 5:3 | 8:2 | 9:3 | 16:0 |
| 2 | Martin Streharsky (SVK) | 4 | 3 | 1 | 28:14 | 3:5 | x | 9:8 | 6:1 | 10:0 |
| 3 | Robert Durkovic (SVK) | 4 | 2 | 2 | 22:25 | 2:8 | 8:9 | x | 7:6 | 5:2 |
| 4 | Lau Yan Chi (HKG) | 4 | 1 | 3 | 22:22 | 3:9 | 1:6 | 6:7 | x | 12:0 |
| 5 | Daniel Gauthier (CAN) | 4 | 0 | 4 | 2:43 | 0:16 | 0:10 | 2:5 | 0:12 | x |

=== Competition bracket ===
Semi-finals
Bruno Valentim (POR) | 6
Martin Streharsky (SVK) | 2
Jose Maria Dueso (ESP) | 2
Leung Yuk Wing (HKG) | 3

Final
Bruno Valentim (POR) | 1
Leung Yuk Wing (HKG) | 5
Third place
Martin Streharsky (SVK) | 2
Jose Maria Dueso (ESP) | 6
