= Wheelchair fencing at the 2004 Summer Paralympics =

Wheelchair fencing at the XII Paralympic Games
- Paralympic Wheelchair fencing
- Venue: Helliniko Fencing Hall
- Dates: 18–23 September 2004
- Competitors: 88 from 20 nations

Wheelchair Fencing at the 2004 Summer Paralympics was competed in Category A and B. Category A contestants were those with good sitting balance and normal fencing arm, while Category B contestants were somewhat impaired in either of these areas. The events were held at the Helliniko Fencing Hall.

== Participating countries ==
- Argentina (1)
- Brazil (1)
- China (3)
- France (11)
- Germany (7)
- Great Britain (1)
- Greece (2)
- Hong Kong (11)
- Hungary (6)
- Iraq (1)
- Italy (7)
- Japan (2)
- Kuwait (3)
- Malaysia (1)
- Poland (12)
- Spain (6)
- South Korea (1)
- Thailand (1)
- Ukraine (3)
- United States (8)

== Medal table ==
Rank	Nation	Gold	Silver	Bronze	Total
1	Hong Kong (HKG)	8	5	1	14
2	France (FRA)	2	0	3	5
3	Poland (POL)	1	6	5	12
4	China (CHN)	1	1	1	3
5	Thailand (THA)	1	0	1	2
5	Ukraine (UKR)	1	0	1	2
7	Italy (ITA)	1	0	0	1
8	Hungary (HUN)	0	3	2	5
9	United States (USA)	0	0	1	1
Totals (9 entries)		15	15	15	45

== Medal summary ==
=== Men's events ===
Event	Gold	Silver	Bronze
Épée individual A	Cyril Moré; France	Radoslaw Stanczuk; Poland	Wai Ip Kwong; Hong Kong
Épée individual B	Andriy Komar; Ukraine	Robert Wysmierski; Poland	John Rodgers; United States
Épée team open	France (FRA); Robert Citerne; Alim Latrèche; David Maillard; Cyril Moré	Poland (POL); Arkadiusz Jablonski; Dariusz Pender; Radoslaw Stanczuk; Robert Wysmierski	China (CHN); Hu Daoliang; Zhang Chong; Lei Zhang
Foil individual A	Ying Ki Fung; Hong Kong	Lei Zhang; China	Dariusz Pender; Poland
Foil individual B	Charn Hung Hui; Hong Kong	Piotr Czop; Poland	Andriy Komar; Ukraine
Foil team open	China (CHN); Hu Daoliang; Zhang Chong; Lei Zhang	Hong Kong (HKG); Kam Loi Chan; Ying Ki Fung; Charn Hung Hui; Wai Ip Kwong	Poland (POL); Piotr Czop; Stefan Makowski; Dariusz Pender; Tomasz Walisiewicz
Sabre individual A	Alberto Pellegrini; Italy	Stefan Makowski; Poland	Arkadiusz Jablonski; Poland
Sabre individual B	Robert Wysmierski; Poland	Charn Hung Hui; Hong Kong	Pál Szekeres; Hungary
Sabre team open	Hong Kong (HKG); Kam Loi Chan; Ying Ki Fung; Charn Hung Hui; Yan Yun Tai	Poland (POL); Piotr Czop; Arkadiusz Jablonski; Stefan Makowski; Robert Wysmierski	France (FRA); Pascal Durand; Moez El Assine; Cyril Moré

=== Women's events ===
Event	Gold	Silver	Bronze
Épée individual A	Chui Yee Yu; Hong Kong	Pui Shan Fan; Hong Kong	Zsuzsanna Krajnyak; Hungary
Épée individual B	Saysunee Jana; Thailand	Yui Chong Chan; Hong Kong	Marta Wyrzykowska; Poland
Épée team open	Hong Kong (HKG); Yui Chong Chan; Pui Shan Fan; Kit Mui Wong; Chui Yee Yu	Hungary (HUN); Gyongyi Dani; Andrea Jurak; Zsuzsanna Krajnyak; Judit Palfi	France (FRA); Emmanuelle Assmann; Sylvie Magnat; Sylviane Meyer; Patricia Picot
Foil individual A	Chui Yee Yu; Hong Kong	Pui Shan Fan; Hong Kong	Patricia Picot; France
Foil individual B	Yui Chong Chan; Hong Kong	Gyongyi Dani; Hungary	Saysunee Jana; Thailand
Foil team open	Hong Kong (HKG); Yui Chong Chan; Pui Shan Fan; Kit Mui Wong; Chui Yee Yu	Hungary (HUN); Gyongyi Dani; Andrea Jurak; Zsuzsanna Krajnyak; Judit Palfi	Poland (POL); Renata Frelik; Jadwiga Polasik; Dagmara Witos; Marta Wyrzykowska

== See also ==
- Fencing at the 2004 Summer Olympics
