= Alessio Sarri =

Italian wheelchair fencer

Personal information
- National team: Italy
- Born: 6 July 1973 (age 53) Rome, Italy

Sport
- Sport: Wheelchair fencing
- Disability class: B
- Events: Foil, Sabre
- Club: Fiamme Oro
Medal record
Event	1st	2nd	3rd
Paralympic Games	0	0	1
World Championships	3	3	1
European Championships	0	3	3
Total	3	6	5

Alessio Sarri (born 6 July 1973) is an Italian male wheelchair fencer who won medals at the Paralympic Games.

== Biography ==
Sarri in addition to his four Olympian participations (he boasts a bronze medal), he also boasts 7 medals at the world championships (three gold) and six at the European championships.

== Achievements ==
Year	Competition	Venue	Rank	Event
2004	Paralympic Games	(Greece) Athens	Round of 16	Foil B
2008	Paralympic Games	(China) Beijing	Quarterfinals	Sabre B
2008	Paralympic Games	(China) Beijing	Round of 16	Foil B
2012	Paralympic Games	(United Kingdom) London	3rd	Sabre B
2016	Paralympic Games	(Brazil) Rio de Janeiro	Quarterfinals	Sabre B
2016	Paralympic Games	(Brazil) Rio de Janeiro	Quarterfinals	Foil B
