= Mario Rodriguez (fencer) =

American wheelchair fencer (born 1959)

Personal information
- Born: 1959 (age 66–67) Houston, Texas, U.S.
- Height: 5 ft 8 in (1.73 m)

Fencing career
- Sport: Fencing
- Personal coach: Les Stawicki, Michael D'Asaro, Mauro Hamza, Amgad Abd El-Halim Khazbak, Jerry Benson, and others in US and Europe.
Medal record
Athletics
Various
Bronze medal – third place	2002 Austin World Cup	Men's épée fencing
Bronze medal – third place	2003 Madrid World Cup	Men's sabre fencing
Gold medal – first place	2011 Parapan American Games	Men's foil fencing

Mario Rodriguez (born 1959), is an American wheelchair fencer.

== Biography ==
Rodriguez was born in Houston, Texas. In 1985 a low speed motorcycle accident revealed a malignant tumor in his right hip resulting in resection, removal, and reconstruction that ultimately failed ending in eventual amputation of his right hip & leg or hip-disarticulation/semi-hemipelvectomy in April, 1992. In 2002 and 2003 respectively he won 3 bronze medals in three different world cups in men's category A foil in Austin, Texas, United States; Madrid, Spain; and Warsaw, Poland. In 2010 he was a gold medalist at the North American Cup for sabre and in 2011 won another gold for foil at the Parapan American Games. Before he became a paralympian he served as a representative of the United States Air Force as a Russian translator in Crete for four years.
