= Gerard Moreno (fencer) =

American paralympic fencer

Personal information
- Nationality: United States
- Born: November 14, 1956 (age 69) Los Angeles, California
Medal record
Athletics
World Cup
Silver medal – second place	1999 World Cup	Men's foil fencing
Bronze medal – third place	1999 World Cup	Men's saber fencing
Pan American Zonal Championships Team
Silver medal – second place	2011 Pan American Zonal Championships T	Men's foil fencing
Gold medal – first place	2011 Pan American Zonal Championships T	Men's foil fencing
North American Cup
Bronze medal – third place	1999 North American Cup	Men's foil fencing
Bronze medal – third place	1999 North American Cup	Men's epee fencing
Bronze medal – third place	1999 North American Cup	Men's foil fencing
Silver medal – second place	1999 North American Cup	Men's foil fencing
Gold medal – first place	2003 North American Cup	Men's fencing
Silver medal – second place	2004 North American Cup	Men's saber fencing
Bronze medal – third place	2004 North American Cup	Men's foil fencing
Silver medal – second place	2005 North American Cup	Men's saber fencing
Bronze medal – third place	2005 North American Cup	Men's foil fencing
Silver medal – second place	2011 North American Cup	Men's foil fencing
Bronze medal – third place	2011 North American Cup	Men's saber fencing
U.S. National Championships
Silver medal – second place	2000 U.S. National Championships	Men's foil fencing
Silver medal – second place	2000 U.S. National Championships	Men's saber fencing
Silver medal – second place	2002 U.S. National Championships	Men's foil fencing
Silver medal – second place	2003 U.S. National Championships	Men's foil fencing
Silver medal – second place	2005 U.S. National Championships	Men's foil fencing
Silver medal – second place	2007 U.S. National Championships	Men's foil fencing
Silver medal – second place	2007 U.S. National Championships	Men's saber fencing
Silver medal – second place	2009 U.S. National Championships	Men's saber fencing
Bronze medal – third place	2010 U.S. National Championships	Men's foil fencing
Silver medal – second place	2010 U.S. National Championships	Men's saber fencing
Silver medal – second place	2012 U.S. National Championships	Men's foil fencing
Silver medal – second place	2012 U.S. National Championships	Men's saber fencing

Gerard Moreno (born November 14, 1956) is a US Paralympic fencer, who has competed in the 2000, 2004, 2008 and 2012 Paralympics. Currently Gerard is ranked #1 in the United States and #13 world-wide.

== Background ==
Born and raised in Los Angeles Gerard was always active in sports and was first introduced to fencing by acting as a sparring partner for his brother. Then in 1981 Gerrard was shot in the chest during a robbery in his home. He spent the next 6 months in hospital and was paralyzed from his waist down.

== Sports ==
Slowly Gerard got back into sports; first with wheelchair tennis, then off-road wheelchair racing in which he won national titles. In 1996 he began his return to fencing competing in sabre and foil and has since competed on four World Championship Teams and 4 Paralympic Teams (Sydney, Athens, Beijing and London).

== Noted Results ==
=== National ===
- 2012 US National Championships Foil & Saber - Silver Medalist – Virginia Beach, VA
- 2011 US National Champion Foil & Saber – Portland, OR
- 2011 North American Cup Foil – Silver Medalist – Kansas City, MO
- 2011 North American Cup Saber – Bronze Medalist – Kansas City, MO
- 2010 US National Championships Foil - Bronze Medalist – Dallas, TX
- 2010 US National Championships Saber - Silver Medalist – Dallas, TX
- 2010 North American Cup Foil – Bronze Medalist – Cincinnati, OH
- 2009 US National Champion Foil – Dallas, TX
- 2009 US National Championships Saber - Silver Medalist – Dallas, TX
- 2007 US National Championships Foil & Saber - Silver Medalist – Miami, FL
- 2006 US National Champion Foil & Saber – Reno, NV
- 2005 US National Championships Saber – Sacramento, CA
- 2005 US National Championships Foil - Silver Medalist – Sacramento, CA
- 2005 North American Cup – Foil – Bronze Medalist – Chattanooga, TN
- 2005 North American Cup – Saber – Silver Medalist – Chattanooga, TN
- 2004 North American Cup Foil - Bronze Medalist – Atlanta, GA
- 2004 North American Cup Saber - Silver Medalist – Charlotte, NC
- 2003 North American Cup – Gold Medalist – Palm Springs, CA
- 2003 US National Championships - Saber - Silver Medalist – Austin, TX
- 2002 US National Champion Saber – Orlando, FL
- 2002 US National Championships Foil - Silver Medalist – Orlando, FL
- 2001 US National Champion Saber – Sandy, UT
- 2001 North American Cup Foil - Bronze Medalist – Louisville, KY
- 2001 North American Cup Saber - Gold Medalist – Palm Springs, CA
- 2000 US National Championships Foil Bronze Medalist – Austin, TX
- 2000 US National Championships Saber - Silver Medalist – Austin, TX
- 1999 North American Cup Saber – Silver Medalist – Cleveland, OH
- 1999 North American Cup Foil – Bronze Medalist – Cleveland, OH
- 1999 North American Cup Foil & Épée - Bronze Medalist – Palm Springs, CA

=== International ===
- 2011 Pan American Zonal Championships Foil – Gold Medalist – São Paulo, Brazil
- 2011 Pan American Zonal Championships Team Foil – Silver Medalist – São Paulo, Brazil
- 2011 World Championships Saber – 16th place – Catania, Italy
- 2011 World Championships Foil – 20th place – Catania, Italy
- 2009 World Cup Foil – Bronze Medalist – Montreal, Canada
- 2008 Paralympic Games Saber – 16th place – Beijing, China
- 2008 Paralympic Games Foil – 15th place – Beijing, China
- 2007 World Cup Foil Team – Bronze Medalist – Montreal, Canada
- 2006 World Championships Saber – 16th place – Torino, Italy
- 2006 World Championships Foil – 11th place – Torino, Italy
- 2006 World Cup Saber – Bronze Medalist, Montreal, Canada
- 2005 World Cup Saber – 9th place – Paris, France
- 2005 World Cup Foil – 10th place – Paris France
- 2004 Paralympic Games Foil – 10th place – Athens, Greece
- 2004 Paralympic Games Saber – 17th – Athens, Greece
- 2003 World Cup Saber – Bronze Medalist - Seville, Spain
- 2003 World Cup Saber – Bronze Medalist - Atlanta, GA
- 2002 Pan American Zonal Championships Saber – Gold Medalist – Austin, TX
- 2002 World Cup Foil – Bronze Medalist – Austin, TX
- 2002 World Championships Saber – 10th place – Budapest, Hungary
- 2002 World Cup Saber – Bronze Medalist – Warsaw, Poland
- 2000 Paralympic Games Saber – 11th place – Sydney, Australia
- 2000 Paralympic Games Foil – 16th place – Sydney, Australia
- 2000 Paralympic Games Team Saber – 8th place – Sydney, Australia
- 2000 World Cup Foil – 9th place – Lonato, Italy
- 2000 World Cup Saber – 9th place – Lonato, Italy
- 1999 World Cup Foil – 9th place – Budapest, Hungary
- 1999 World Cup Saber – 13th place – Budapest, Hungary
- 1999 World Cup Foil – 11th place – Oviedo, Spain
- 1999 World Cup Saber – 8th place – Oviedo, Spain
- 1999 World Cup Foil – Bronze Medalist – Montreal, Canada
- 1999 World Cup Saber – Silver Medalist – Montreal, Canada
- 1998 World Championships Foil – 21st place – Euskirchen, Germany
- 1998 World Championships Saber – 12th place – Euskirchen, Germany
