= Gyöngyi Dani =

Hungarian wheelchair fencer

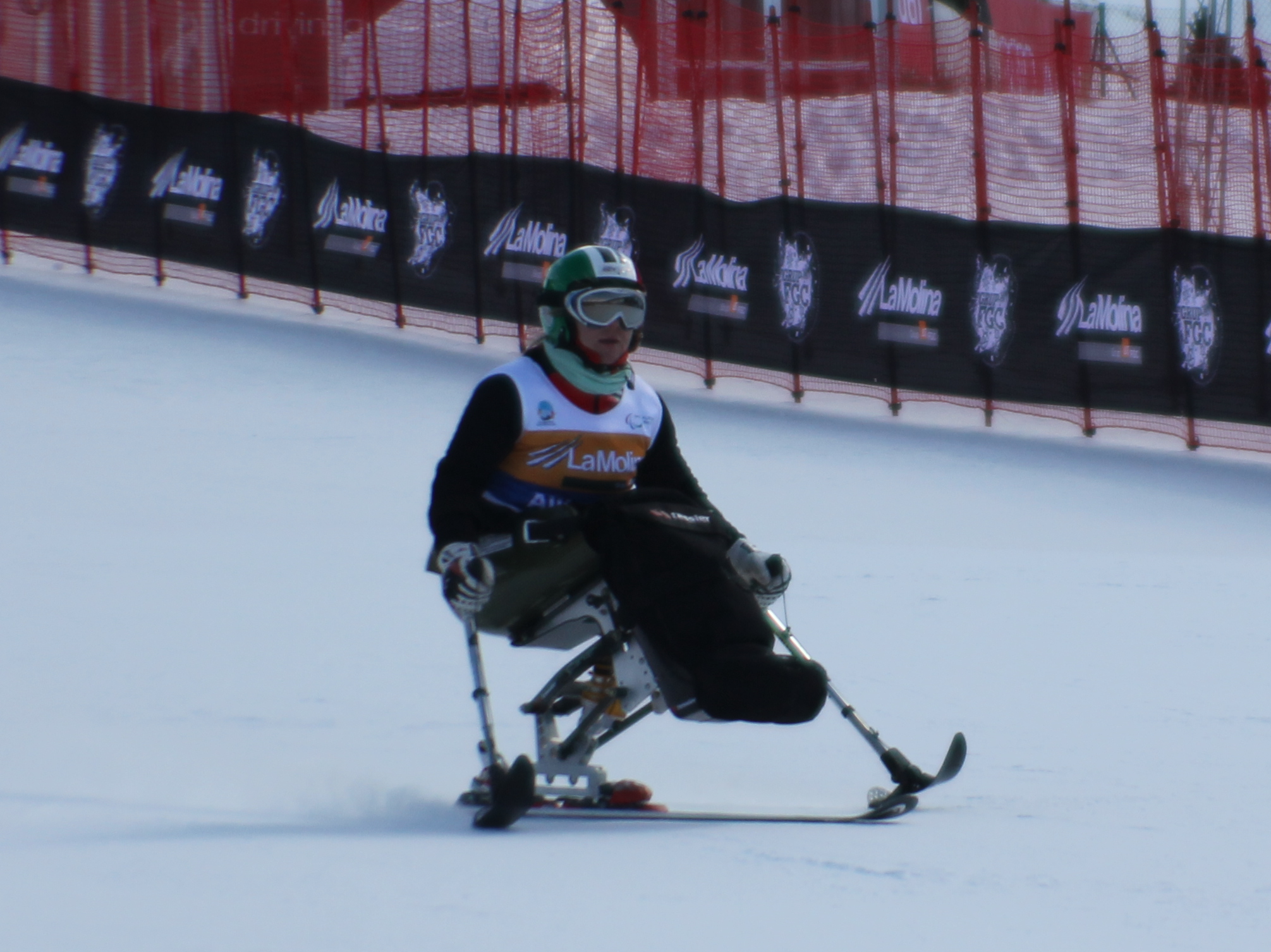
- IPC Alpine World Championships. Women's Giant Slalom, 2013

Personal information
- Born: 3 July 1975 (age 50) Kaposvár, Hungary

Sport
- Country: Hungary
- Sport: Wheelchair fencing, Para-alpine skiing
Medal record
Wheelchair fencing
Representing Hungary
Paralympic Games
Silver medal – second place	2004 Athens	Épée team
Silver medal – second place	2004 Athens	Foil team
Silver medal – second place	2004 Athens	Foil individual B
Silver medal – second place	2012 London	Foil individual B
Silver medal – second place	2012 London	Épée team
Silver medal – second place	2016 Rio de Janeiro	Foil team
Bronze medal – third place	2016 Rio de Janeiro	Épée team
Bronze medal – third place	2020 Tokyo	Foil team
World Championships
Gold medal – first place	2019 Cheongju	Foil team
Silver medal – second place	2002 Budapest	Foil individual B
Silver medal – second place	2010 Paris	Foil team
Silver medal – second place	2011 Catania	Foil team
Silver medal – second place	2015 Eger	Foil team
Silver medal – second place	2015 Eger	Foil individual B
Bronze medal – third place	2002 Budapest	Foil team
Bronze medal – third place	2002 Budapest	Épée team
Bronze medal – third place	2006 Turin	Foil individual B
Bronze medal – third place	2006 Turin	Foil team
Bronze medal – third place	2006 Turin	Épée team
Bronze medal – third place	2010 Paris	Foil individual B
Bronze medal – third place	2011 Catania	Foil individual B
Bronze medal – third place	2011 Catania	Épée team
Bronze medal – third place	2013 Budapest	Épée team
Bronze medal – third place	2013 Budapest	Foil team
Bronze medal – third place	2015 Eger	Épée team
Bronze medal – third place	2017 Rome	Épée team
Bronze medal – third place	2017 Rome	Foil team
Bronze medal – third place	2019 Cheongju	Épée team

Gyöngyi Dani (born 3 July 1975) is a Hungarian wheelchair fencer and para-alpine skier who has won silver medals at several Paralympic Games. She was Hungary's flag bearer during the opening ceremony of the postponed 2020 Summer Paralympics in Tokyo. She returned with a bronze medal.

== Life ==
Dani was born in Kaposvár in 1975. She had an accident when she was 16 that left her with spinal injuries. She took up sport in order to meet people.

She was at the 2008 Paralympics as part of Hungary's fencing team competing in the Women's épée and foil.

She beat the UK athlete Justine Moore in the women's individual Épée Category B before she took the silver medal in 2012. The match was at the Excel Arena in London.

She was at the IWAS Wheelchair Fencing World Cup in Montreal in 2018 where the team took four victories. She won an individual award as did 11-time Paralympic medallist Zsuzsanna Krajnyak and Amarilla Veres. They also won a gold in the women’s team sabre.

She was Hungary's flag bearer during the opening ceremony of the postponed 2020 Summer Paralympics in Tokyo. She was part of Hungary's team with Éva Hajmási and Zsuzsanna Krajnyák and they achieved the bronze medal position in the women's team foil gold. The silver and gold medals were taken by Italy and China respectively.

In January 2022 the wheelchair fencing team of Dani, Zsuzsanna Krajnyák, Dr. Boglárka Mező Madarászné and Éva Hajmási were Hungary's "best disabled team of the year".

In her career as a wheelchair fencer, she won 10 gold medals at the European Championships, as well as 3 silver medals and 1 bronze medal. At the World Championships she won 20 medals in total: 1 gold, 5 silver, and 14 bronze. The gold medal at the World Championships was one of the greatest achievements of her career, particularly because it was the first gold medal at such championships in the history of Hungarian sport.

== Private life ==
Dani is married to Balázs Nagy and has a son born before Rio.
