= Yu Chui Yee =

Hong Kong wheelchair fencer

Personal information
- Born: 29 March 1984 (age 42)
Medal record
Wheelchair fencing
Representing Hong Kong
Paralympic Games
Gold medal – first place	2004 Athens	Individual foil A
Gold medal – first place	2004 Athens	Team foil
Gold medal – first place	2004 Athens	Individual épée A
Gold medal – first place	2004 Athens	Team épée
Gold medal – first place	2008 Beijing	Individual foil A
Gold medal – first place	2012 London	Individual foil A
Gold medal – first place	2012 London	Individual épée A
Silver medal – second place	2008 Beijing	Individual épée A
Silver medal – second place	2016 Rio de Janeiro	Individual épée A
Silver medal – second place	2016 Rio de Janeiro	Women's team épée
Bronze medal – third place	2012 London	Women's team open
Asian Para Games
Gold medal – first place	2010 Guangzhou	Individual épée A
Gold medal – first place	2014 Incheon	Team foil
Gold medal – first place	2018 Jakarta	Individual foil A
Silver medal – second place	2010 Guangzhou	Team épée
Silver medal – second place	2014 Incheon	Individual épée A
Silver medal – second place	2014 Incheon	Team épée
Silver medal – second place	2018 Jakarta	Team épée
Silver medal – second place	2018 Jakarta	Team foil
Silver medal – second place	2022 Hangzhou	Team foil
Bronze medal – third place	2010 Guangzhou	Individual foil A
Bronze medal – third place	2014 Incheon	Individual foil A
Bronze medal – third place	2018 Jakarta	Individual épée A
Bronze medal – third place	2018 Jakarta	Individual sabre A
Bronze medal – third place	2022 Hangzhou	Individual foil A
Bronze medal – third place	2022 Hangzhou	Individual épée A

Alison Yu Chui-yee (Chinese: 余翠怡; Jyutping: jyu^{4} ceoi^{3} ji^{4}; born 29 March 1984) is a wheelchair fencer from Hong Kong. When she was 11 years old, she had bone cancer, leading to the amputation of her left leg. She began as a swimmer but switched to fencing at the age of 17. At the 2004 Summer Paralympics, she won four gold medals in both the individual and team events of épée and foil. She was the first athlete to win four gold medals in fencing in category A in 2004. At the 2008 Summer Paralympics, she represented Hong Kong again, but since the team matches were canceled, she only won one gold and one silver medal in the individual events.

== Career ==
Yu first made her Paralympic games debut representing Hong Kong in the 2004 Summer Paralympic Games in Athens. She won four gold medals in wheelchair fencing in category A individual foil, team foil, individual épée, and team épée, becoming the first athlete to win four gold medals in fencing.

In the 2008 Summer Paralympics in Beijing, Yu won gold in the Individual foil category A, and earned silver in the Individual épée category A, being bested by Zhang Chuncui who represented China. However, in the 2012 Summer Paralympics in London, Yu took home gold medals in both individual épée category A and individual foil category A. She also earned a bronze medal in the open category team épée alongside teammates Chan Yui-chong and Fan Pui-shan.

During the 2016 Summer Paralympics in Rio de Janeiro, Yu secured a silver medal in category A individual foil and in team épée with teammates Chan Yui-chong and Ng Justine Charissa.

== Personal life ==
In addition to attaining seven Paralympic gold medals, Yu is also a radio host, a columnist on the official paralympic movement website, and a co-founder of the Fencing Sport Academy for young children and teenagers. In her spare time, Yu stated she is an avid swimmer, runner, and plans to take up scuba diving and paragliding.

Following her Paralympic debut in the 2004 Paralympic games in Athens, Yu was granted admission into the Chinese University of Hong Kong's Department of Geography and Resource Management, where she obtained her MA in Sports Studies.
