= Judit Pálfi =

Hungarian wheelchair fencer

Personal information
- Born: 1968 (age 57–58) Veresegyhaza, Hungary

Sport
- Country: Hungary
- Sport: Wheelchair fencing
- Disability: Spinal cord injury
Medal record
Wheelchair fencing
Representing Hungary
Paralympic Games
Silver medal – second place	1996 Atlanta	Foil individual B
Silver medal – second place	2000 Sydney	Épée individual B
Silver medal – second place	2004 Athens	Foil team
Silver medal – second place	2004 Athens	Épée team

Judit Horváth Pálfi (born 1968) is a Hungarian retired wheelchair fencer who competed at international fencing competitions. She is a four-time Paralympic silver medalist.

In 1991, Pálfi was involved in a car accident, suffering a lower back injury which resulted in paralysis. She started out wheelchair fencing a year later and entered the 1996 Summer Paralympics as a wildcard.
