= Alim Latrèche =

French wheelchair fencer

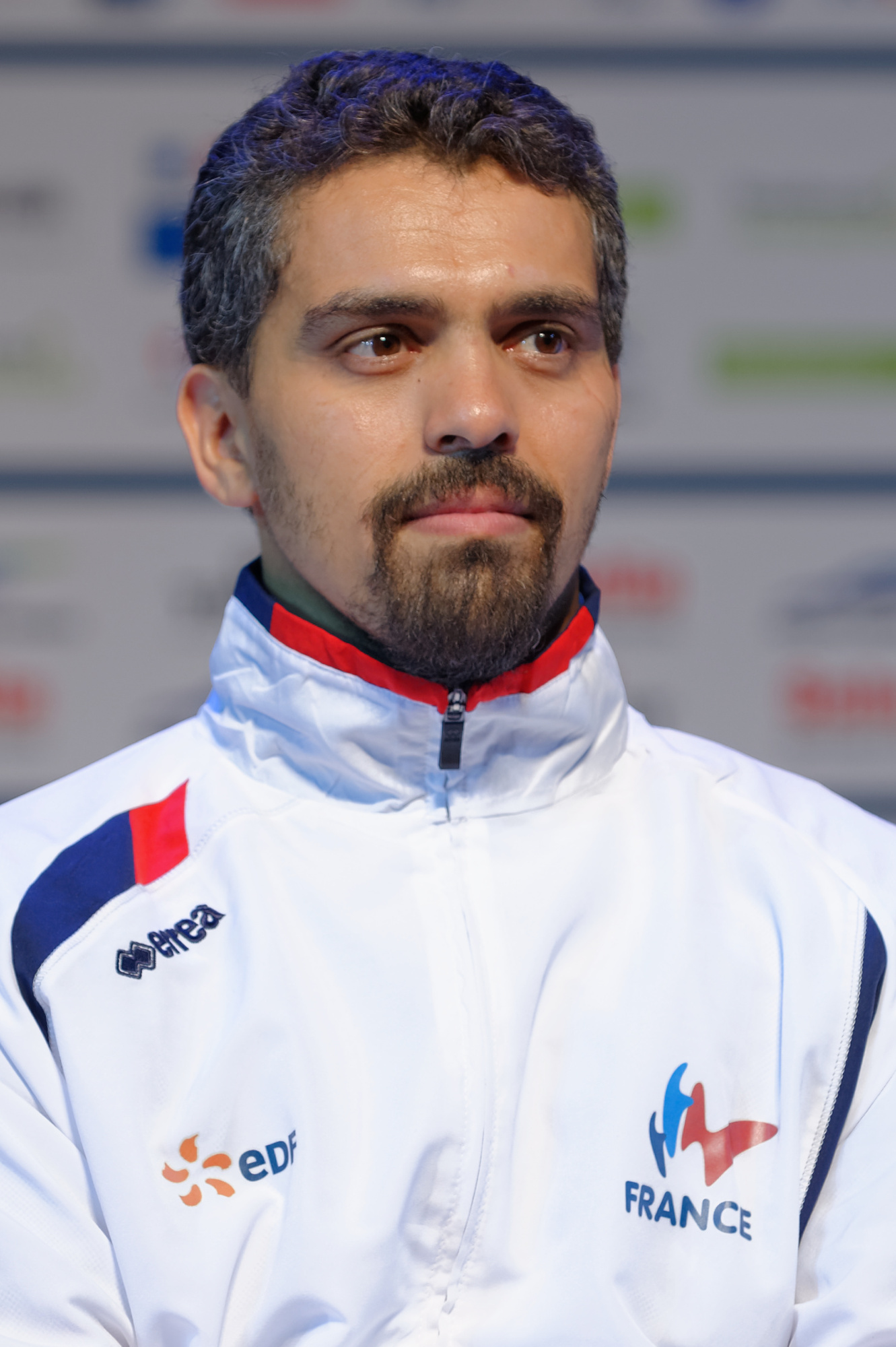
- Latrèche in 2014

Personal information
- Born: 5 December 1979 (age 46) Grenoble, France

Sport
- Country: France
- Sport: Wheelchair fencing
Medal record
Wheelchair fencing
Representing France
Paralympic Games
| Gold medal – first place | 2004 Athens | Team épée |
| Silver medal – second place | 2012 London | Team foil |
| Bronze medal – third place | 2012 London | Individual épée B |
| Bronze medal – third place | 2012 London | Individual foil B |
World IWAS Championships
| Gold medal – first place | 2015 Eger | Team foil |
| Gold medal – first place | 2015 Eger | Team épée |
| Silver medal – second place | 2010 Paris | Individual épée |
| Silver medal – second place | 2011 Catania | Team épée |
| Silver medal – second place | 2011 Catania | Individual foil B |
| Bronze medal – third place | 2002 Budapest | Team foil |
| Bronze medal – third place | 2002 Budapest | Team épée |
| Bronze medal – third place | 2010 Paris | Individual foil B |
| Bronze medal – third place | 2010 Paris | Team foil |
| Bronze medal – third place | 2011 Catania | Individual épée B |
| Bronze medal – third place | 2015 Eger | Individual épée B |
European IWAS Championships
| Gold medal – first place | 2009 Warsaw | Team épée |
| Gold medal – first place | 2009 Warsaw | Team foil |
| Gold medal – first place | 2014 Strasbourg | Team épée |
| Silver medal – second place | 2014 Strasbourg | Individual foil B |
| Bronze medal – third place | 2009 Warsaw | Individual foil B |
| Bronze medal – third place | 2011 Sheffield | Individual foil B |
| Bronze medal – third place | 2014 Strasbourg | Team foil |

Alim Latrèche (born 5 December 1979) is a French retired wheelchair fencer who competes at international fencing competitions. He is a Paralympic champion, double World champion and three-time European champion in épée.
