= Toyoaki Hisakawa =

Japanese wheelchair fencer

Toyoaki Hisakawa (久川 豊昌, Hisakawa Toyoaki) is a Japanese wheelchair fencer.

Hisakawa began wheelchair fencing in 1997 after a spinal cord injury. He participated in the 1998, 1999, and 2000 Wheelchair Fencing World Cups as well as the 1999 FESPIC Games in Bangkok. He has represented Japan at three editions of the Summer Paralympic Games, in 2000, 2004, and 2008, each time competing in both foil B and épée B events.
