= Pascal Durand =

French lawyer and politician of La République En Marche (born 1960)

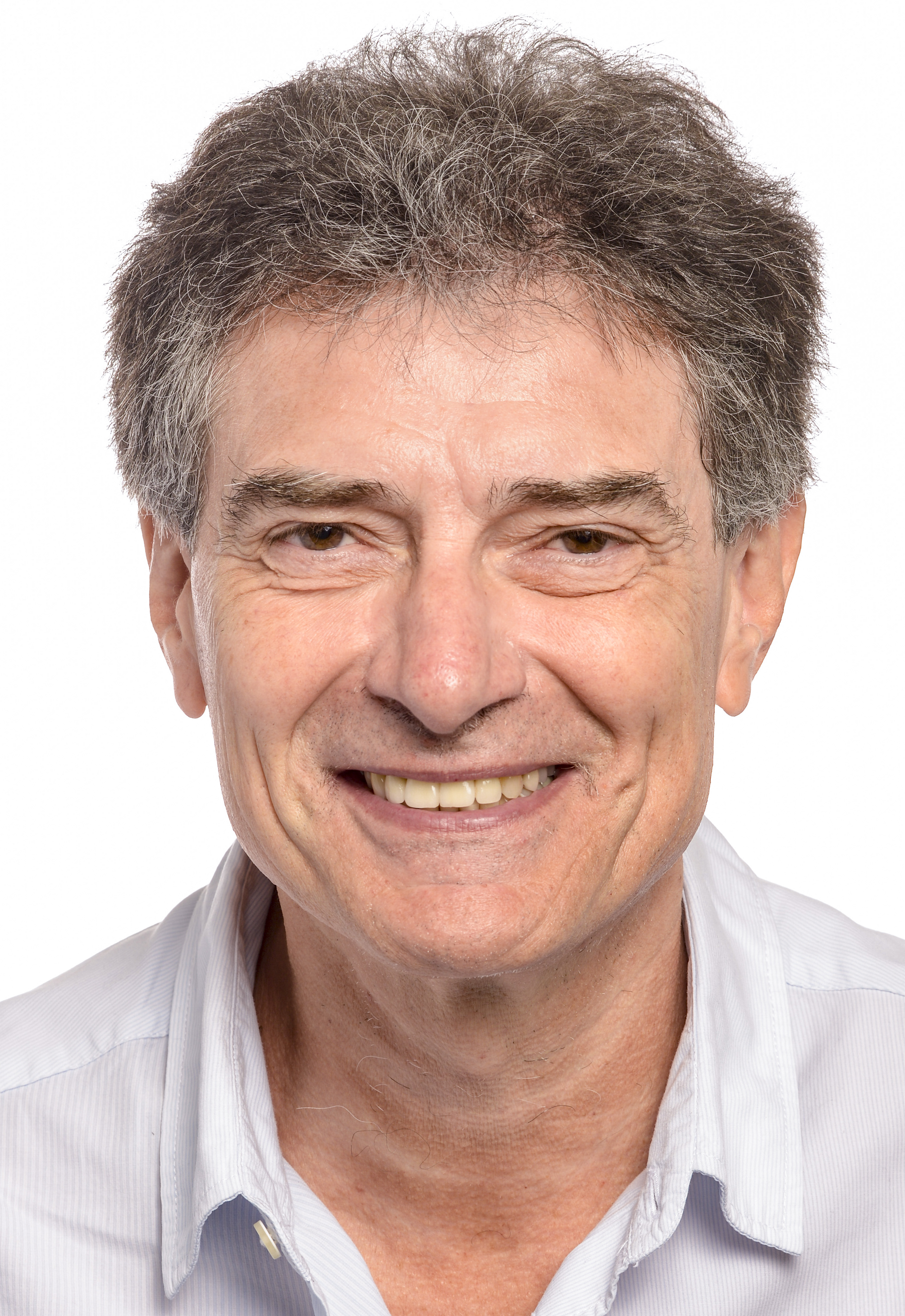

Member of the European Parliament
- In office 1 July 2014 – 15 July 2024
- Constituency: France

National Secretary of Europe Ecology – The Greens
- In office 23 June 2012 – 30 November 2013
- Preceded by: Cécile Duflot
- Succeeded by: Emmanuelle Cosse

Personal details
- Born: 3 October 1960 (age 65) Montreuil, France
- Party: Europe Ecology – The Greens (2010–2016); La République En Marche! (2019–2022)

Pascal Durand (born 3 October 1960) is a French lawyer and politician of La République En Marche ! (LREM) who has been serving as a Member of the European Parliament from 2014 to 2024.

== Political career ==
=== Career in national politics ===
Durand was elected spokesperson for Europe Ecology – The Greens (EELV) at the party's 2011 congress in La Rochelle. He later served as national secretary of EELV from 23 June 2012 to 30 November 2013, succeeding Cécile Duflot.

In the EELV primaries ahead of the 2012 presidential elections, Durand served as director of candidate Nicolas Hulot's campaign. When Hulot eventually lost against Eva Joly, Durand joined Joly's campaign team.

=== Member of the European Parliament ===
Since 2014, Durand has been a Member of the European Parliament. In May 2019, he was reelected, this time as member of the Renew Europe group.

In parliament, Durand has been serving on the Committee on Constitutional Affairs since 2014. On the Committee, he serves as coordinator for the Renew Europe group where he works to reform EU institutions and to launch the works of the Conference on the Future of Europe. Since 2021, he has been part of the Parliament's delegation to the Conference.

Durand is also a substitute member of the Committee on Legal Affairs (JURI) and the Committee on Budgetary Control (CONT). In the past, he was a member of the Committee on the Internal Market and Consumer Protection (2014-2019) and the Committee of Inquiry into Money Laundering, Tax Avoidance and Tax Evasion (2016-2017) that investigated the Panama Papers revelations and tax avoidance schemes more broadly. Notably, he authored an own-initiative report on the extension of product lifetime (2017) and served as lead rapporteur on the Corporate Sustainability Reporting Directive (2022).

In February 2016, Durand left EELV to join Nicolas Hulot's campaign for the 2017 presidential elections.

In 2019, Durand was the only French delegate to vote against the Directive on Copyright in the Digital Single Market.`

In addition to his committee assignments, Durand is part of the European Parliament Intergroup on Fighting against Poverty, the European Parliament Intergroup on the Welfare and Conservation of Animals, the Responsible Business Conduct Working Group, the MEPs Against Cancer group and the Spinelli Group.

Pascal Durand led the negotiation on the Corporate Sustainability Reporting Directive as rapporteur for the European Parliament.

== Political positions ==
In the preparations for a Conference on the Future of Europe in 2020, Durand proposed Joschka Fischer and Emma Bonino as potential chairs for the conference.

In May 2021, Durand joined a group of 39 mostly Green Party lawmakers from the European Parliament who in a letter urged the leaders of Germany, France and Italy not to support Arctic LNG 2, a $21 billion Russian Arctic liquefied natural gas (LNG) project, due to climate change concerns.
