= Hellinikon Fencing Hall =

Sports arena in Athens, Greece

- Hellinikon Indoor Olympic Fencing Hall
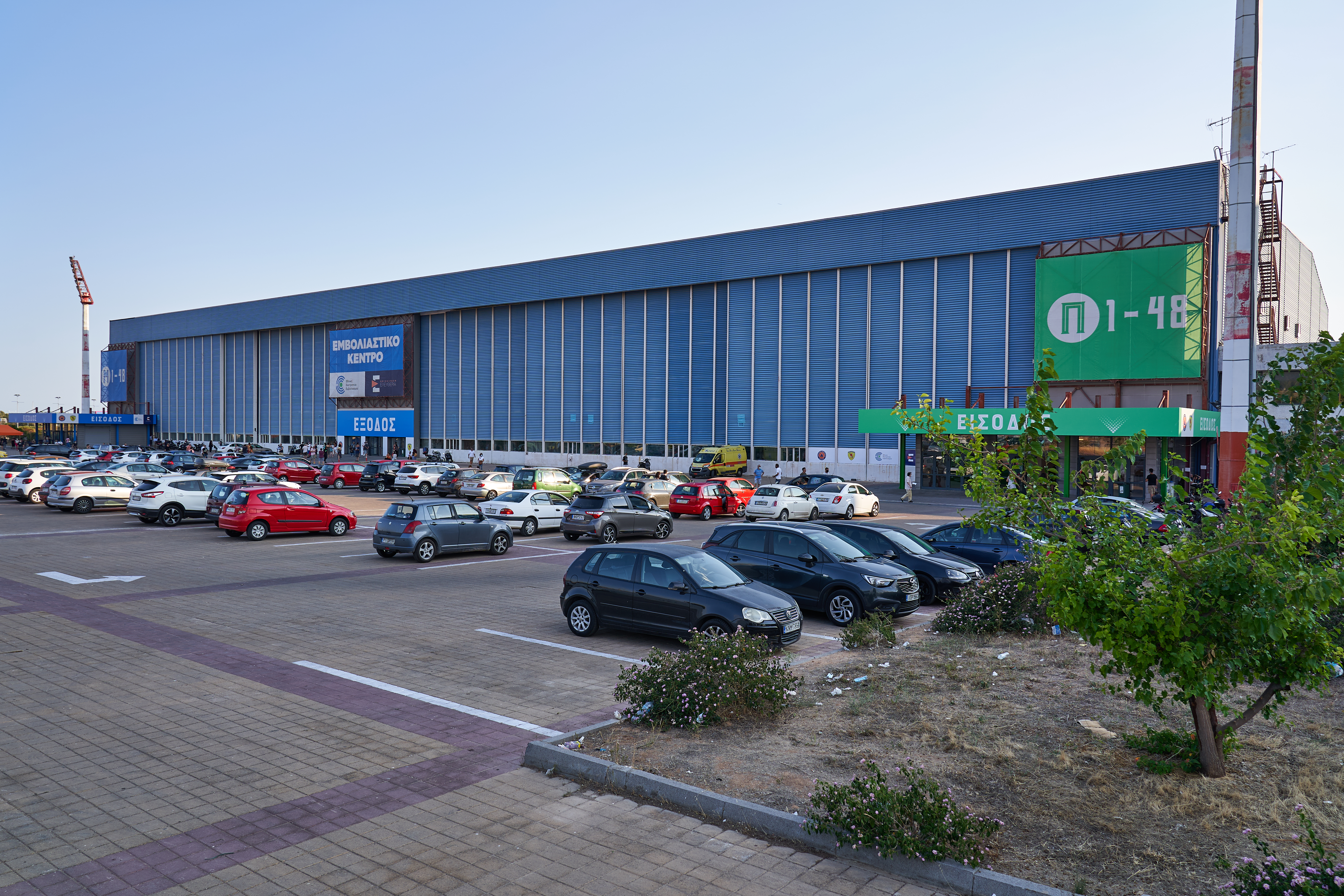
- The fencing hall in 2021 as a vaccination center during the COVID-19 pandemic.
- Interactive map of Hellinikon Fencing Hall
- Location: Hellinikon, Athens, Greece
- Coordinates: 37.8954°N 23.7228°E
- Owner: Olympic Properties S.A.
- Operator: Olympic Properties S.A.
- Capacity: Basketball: 5,000; Fencing: 5,000

Construction
- Opened: July 30, 2004
- Demolished: 2022

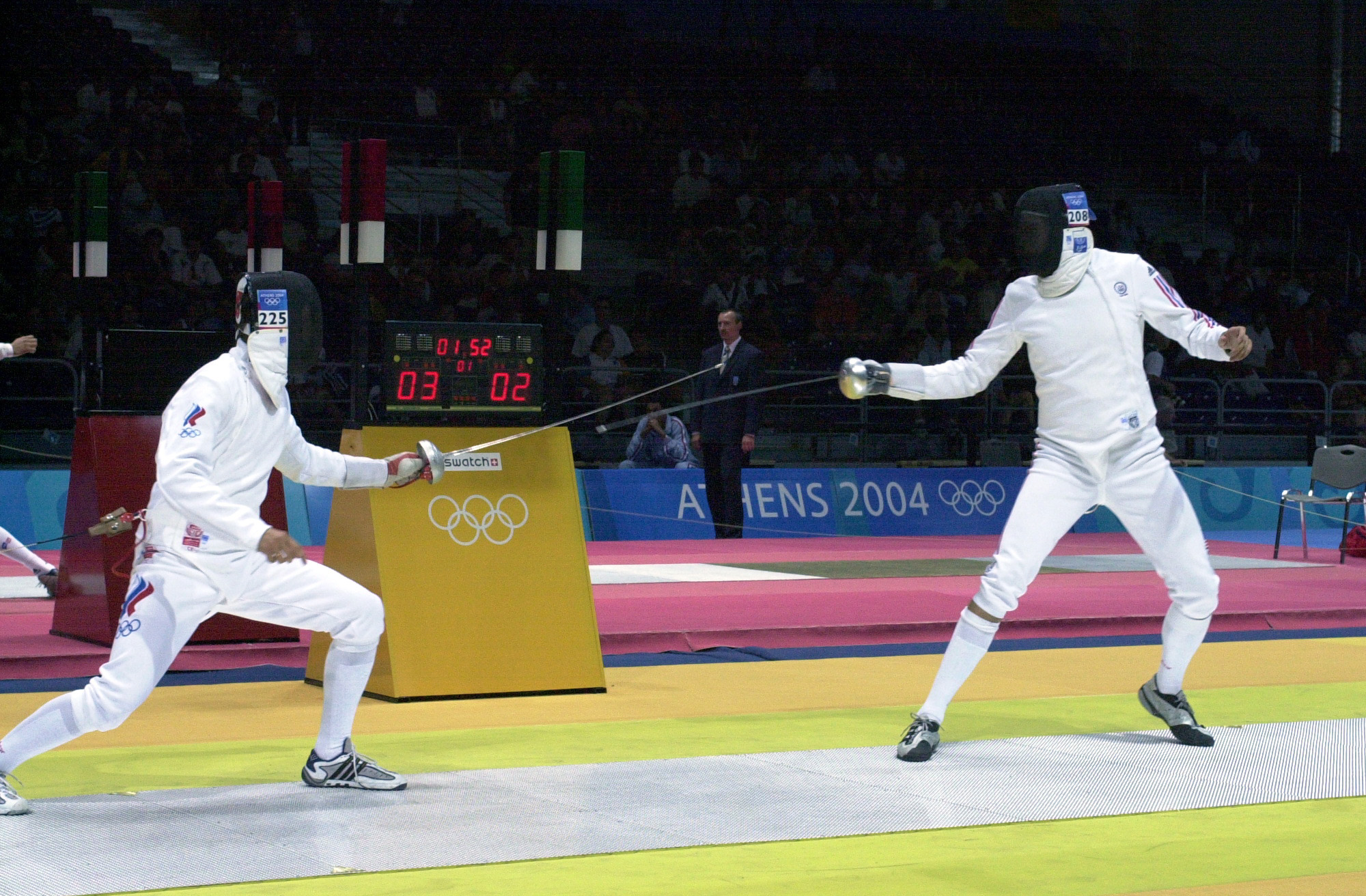
Fencing during the 2004 Olympics.

The Hellinikon Fencing Hall was a multi-purpose indoor sporting arena that was located adjacent to the Hellinikon Olympic Arena, in Hellinikon, Athens, Greece. The venue was part of the Hellinikon Events Hall of the Hellinikon Olympic Complex. It was demolished in 2022.

== History ==
The facility was officially opened on July 30, 2004. It hosted the fencing matches at the 2004 Summer Olympics in Athens, Greece. The facility seated 3,800 for the preliminary matches, and 5,000 for the final matches. During the 2004 Summer Paralympic Games, the Fencing Hall was the venue for wheelchair fencing.

== See also ==
- Hellinikon Olympic Complex
