= Table tennis at the 2008 Summer Paralympics – Men's team – Class 6–8 =

Men's Team Class 6–8 at the XIII Paralympic Games
- Venue: Peking University Gymnasium
- Dates: 13 – 16 September 2008
- Competitors: 13

Medalists
1st place, gold medalist(s)		Chen Gang; Ye Chaoqun; Li Manzhou; Qin Xiaojun	China
2nd place, silver medalist(s)		Richard Csejtey; Miroslav Jambor	Slovakia
3rd place, bronze medalist(s)		Francois Serignat; Stephane Messi; Alain Pichon	France

The Men's Team Class 6–8 table tennis competition at the 2008 Summer Paralympics was held between 13 September and 16 September at the Peking University Gymnasium. Classes 6–10 were for athletes with a physical impairment who competed from a standing position; the lower the number, the greater the impact the impairment had on an athlete’s ability to compete.

The competition was a straight knock-out format. Each tie was decided by the best of a potential five matches, two singles, a doubles (not necessarily the same players) and two reverse singles.

The event was won by the team representing China.

== Competition bracket ==
Round of 16
South Africa	0
Israel	3
China	3
Great Britain	0
Chinese Taipei	0
Germany	3
Denmark	1
Poland	3
Spain	3
Russia	1

Quarterfinals
Belgium	1
Israel	3
China	3
Germany	2
France	3
Poland	1
Spain	0
Slovakia	3

Semifinals
Israel	0
China	3
France	1
Slovakia	3

Final
China	3
Slovakia	0
Third place
Israel	2
France	3

== First round ==
13 September 2008; 19:00	Israel	3–0	South Africa

Report	Individual matches
Shmuel Shur	3–0	Pieter du Plooy	11–6, 11–9, 11–2
Zeev Glikman	3–0	Johan du Plooy	11–5, 11–9, 11–9
Shmuel Shur / Zeev Glikman	3–0	Pieter du Plooy / Johan du Plooy	11–7, 11–8, 11–8

13 September 2008; 19:00	China	3–0	Great Britain

Report	Individual matches
Ye Chaoqun	3–0	Paul Karabardak	16–14, 11–8, 11–5
Chen Gang	3–1	Will Bayley	11–4, 9–11, 11–7, 11–8
Li Manzhou / Qin Xiaojun	3–0	Will Bayley / Dave Wetherill	11–4, 11–7, 11–9

13 September 2008; 19:00	Chinese Taipei	0–3	Germany

Report	Individual matches
Hu Ming-fu	2–3	Daniel Arnold	7–11, 11–7, 11–9, 10–12, 7–11
Hou Ting-sung	1–3	Jochen Wollmert	16–14, 5–11, 8–11, 7–11
Hu Ming Fu / Hou Ting Sung	2–3	Rainer Schmidt / Jochen Wollmert	11–7, 7–11, 11–8, 11–13, 9–11

13 September 2008; 19:00	Poland	3–1	Denmark

Report	Individual matches
Marcin Skrzynecki	3–1	Michal Jensen	11–5, 5–11, 11–3, 11–9
Piotr Grudzien	3–1	Peter Rosenmeier	11–6, 12–14, 11–8, 11–7
Adam Jurasz / Miroslaw Kowalski	2–3	Michal Jensen / Peter Rosenmeier	9–11, 16–14, 5–11, 11–8, 7–11
Marcin Skrzynecki	3–1	Peter Rosenmeier	11–4, 11–6, 13–15, 11–7

13 September 2008; 19:00	Spain	3–1	Russia

Report	Individual matches
Alvaro Valera	3–0	Alexander Esaulov	11–4, 11–7, 11–6
Jordi Morales	3–1	Vadim Buzin	12–10, 11–6, 9–11, 11–9
Alvaro Valera / Jordi Morales	2–3	Alexander Esaulov / Vadim Buzin	11–5, 10–12, 9–11, 11–5, 10–12
Alvaro Valera	3–0	Vadim Buzin	11–4, 11–8, 11–7

== Quarter-finals ==
14 September 2008; 12:30	Israel	3–1	Belgium

Report	Individual matches
Zeev Glikman	3–1	Mathieu Loicq	11–8, 11–9, 9–11, 11–9
Shmuel Shur	0–3	Marc Ledoux	4–11, 8–11, 5–11
Zeev Glikman / Shmuel Shur	3–1	Mathieu Loicq / Nico Vergeylen	11–7, 7–11, 11–5, 11–5
Zeev Glikman	3–2	Marc Ledoux	8–11, 11–6, 11–7, 9–11, 11–8

14 September 2008; 12:30	China	3–2	Germany

Report	Individual matches
Ye Chaoqun	3–0	Daniel Arnold	11–7, 11–6, 11–5
Chen Gang	0–3	Jochen Wollmert	9–11, 6–11, 9–11
Ye Chaoqun / Chen Gang	3–2	Daniel Arnold / Jochen Wollmert	7–11, 9–11, 11–3, 11–9, 11–6
Ye Chaoqun	2–3	Jochen Wollmert	4–11, 11–4, 11–9, 12–14, 9–11
Chen Gang	3–2	Daniel Arnold	11–13, 11–9, 12–10, 5–11, 11–8

14 September 2008; 12:30	France	3–1	Poland

Report	Individual matches
Francois Serignat	3–0	Piotr Grudzien	11–2, 11–7, 11–4
Stephane Messi	3–0	Marcin Skrzynecki	12–10, 11–9, 11–5
Francois Serignat / Stephane Messi	2–3	Piotr Grudzien / Marcin Skrzynecki	11–5, 8–11, 10–12, 15–13, 11–13
Francois Serignat	3–0	Marcin Skrzynecki	11–7, 11–3, 11–4

14 September 2008; 12:30	Slovakia	3–0	Spain

Report	Individual matches
Richard Csejtey	3–1	Jordi Morales	11–9, 9–11, 11–7, 11–6
Miroslav Jambor	3–2	Alvaro Valera	11–9, 3–11, 7–11, 12–10, 13–11
Richard Csejtey / Miroslav Jambor	3–1	Jordi Morales / Alvaro Valera	12–10, 9–11, 11–6, 13–11

== Semi-finals ==
14 September 2008; 19:00	Israel	0–3	China

Report	Individual matches
Zeev Glikman	2–3	Chen Gang	11–8, 9–11, 11–9, 3–11, 5–11
Shmuel Shur	0–3	Ye Chaoqun	4–11, 7–11, 6–11
Zeev Glikman / Shmuel Shur	1–3	Ye Chaoqun / Li Manzhou	11–8, 5–11, 8–11, 8–11

14 September 2008; 19:00	Slovakia	3–1	France

Report	Individual matches
Richard Csejtey	2–3	Francois Serignat	8–11, 11–9, 11–8, 3–11, 7–11
Miroslav Jambor	3–1	Stephane Messi	11–8, 11–6, 5–11, 12–10
Richard Csejtey / Miroslav Jambor	3–2	Stephane Messi / Francois Serignat	7–11, 11–7, 5–11, 11–8, 12–10
Richard Csejtey	3–2	Stephane Messi	11–8, 9–11, 10–12, 12–10, 11–6

== Finals ==
Gold medal match

16 September 2008; 12:30	China	3–0	Slovakia

Report	Individual matches
Ye Chaoqun	3–1	Miroslav Jambor	8–11, 11–6, 11–8, 11–3
Chen Gang	3–2	Richard Csejtey	9–11, 9–11, 11–6, 12–10, 11–9
Ye Chaoqun / Chen Gang	3–1	Miroslav Jambor / Richard Csejtey	11–6, 11–7, 3–11, 12–10

Bronze medal match

16 September 2008; 12:30	France	3–2	Israel

Report	Individual matches
Francois Serignat	3–1	Shmuel Shur	11–5, 11–8, 7–11, 11–3
Stephane Messi	0–3	Zeev Glikman	5–11, 2–11, 7–11
Alain Pichon / Francois Serignat	3–2	Shmuel Shur / Zeev Glikman	11–8, 11–8, 7–11, 6–11, 11–9
Francois Serignat	1–3	Zeev Glikman	11–13, 4–11, 11–9, 9–11
Stephane Messi	3–0	Shmuel Shur	11–9, 11–3, 11–7

== Team Lists ==
Belgium; Mathieu Loicq; Marc Ledoux; Nico Vergeylen	South Africa; Pieter du Plooy; Johan du Plooy	Israel; Zeev Glikman; Shmuel Shur	China; Chen Gang; Ye Chaoqun; Li Manzhou; Qin Xiaojun
Great Britain; Paul Karabardak; Will Bayley; Dave Wetherill	Chinese Taipei; Hu Ming Fu; Hou Ting Sung	Germany; Rainer Schmidt; Jochen Wollmert; Daniel Arnold	France; Francois Serignat; Stephane Messi; Alain Pichon
Denmark; Michal Jensen; Peter Rosenmeier	Poland; Miroslaw Kowalski; Adam Jurasz; Piotr Grudzien; Marcin Skrzynecki	Spain; Alvaro Valera; Jordi Morales	Russia; Alexander Esaulov; Vadim Buzin
Slovakia; Richard Csejtey; Miroslav Jambor
