= Table tennis at the 2004 Summer Paralympics – Men's team – Class 6–7 =

Table Tennis - Men's Teams 6-7 at the XII Paralympic Games
- Paralympic Table Tennis
- Venue: Galatsi Olympic Hall
- Dates: 23–27 September 2004
- Competitors: 7

Medalists
1st place, gold medalist(s)		Rainer Schmidt; Daniel Arnold; Dieter Meyer; Jochen Wollmert	Germany
2nd place, silver medalist(s)		Adam Jurasz; Miroslaw Kowalski	Poland
3rd place, bronze medalist(s)		Simon Itkonen; Linus Loennberg	Sweden

The Men's Teams 6-7 table tennis competition at the 2004 Summer Paralympics was held from 23 to 27 September at the Galatsi Olympic Hall.

Classes 6–10 were for athletes with a physical impairment who competed from a standing position; the lower the number, the greater the impact the impairment had on an athlete’s ability to compete.

The event was won by the team representing Germany.

== Results ==
=== Preliminaries ===
Qualified for final round

==== Group A ====
Rank	Competitor	MP	W	L	Points	GER	POL	UKR
1	Germany	2	2	0	6:0	x	3:0	3:0
2	Poland	2	1	1	3:4	0:3	x	3:1
3	Ukraine	2	0	2	1:6	0:3	1:3	x

==== Group B ====
Rank	Competitor	MP	W	L	Points	FRA	DEN	SWE	NED
1	France	3	2	1	8:5	x	3:1	2:3	3:1
2	Sweden	3	2	1	8:5	3:2	2:3	x	3:0
3	Denmark	3	2	1	7:7	1:3	x	3:2	3:2
4	Netherlands	3	0	3	3:9	1:3	2:3	0:3	x

=== Competition bracket ===
Semi-finals
Germany	3
Sweden	0
Poland	3
France	2

Final
Germany	3
Poland	1
Third place
Sweden	3
France	2

== Team Lists ==
Germany; Rainer Schmidt; Daniel Arnold; Dieter Meyer; Jochen Wollmert	Poland; Adam Jurasz; Miroslaw Kowalski	Ukraine; Dmytro Bidnyy; Mykhaylo Popov	France; Stephane Messi; Jean Yves Abbadie
Sweden; Simon Itkonen; Linus Loennberg	Denmark; Michael Jensen; Peter Rosenmeier	Netherlands; Nico Blok; Harold Kersten	
