= Table tennis at the 2008 Summer Paralympics – Men's individual – Class 7 =

Men's Individual Class 7 at the XIII Paralympic Games
- Venue: Peking University Gymnasium
- Dates: 7 – 11 September 2008
- Competitors: 16 from 13 nations

Medalists
1st place, gold medalist(s)		Jochen Wollmert	Germany
2nd place, silver medalist(s)		Ye Chaoqun	China
3rd place, bronze medalist(s)		Alvaro Valera	Spain

The Men's Individual Class 7 table tennis competition at the 2008 Summer Paralympics was held between 7 September and 11 September at the Peking University Gymnasium.

Classes 6–10 were for athletes with a physical impairment who competed from a standing position; the lower the number, the greater the impact the impairment had on an athlete’s ability to compete.

The event was won by Jochen Wollmert, representing Germany.

== Results ==
=== Preliminary round ===
Qualified for the knock-out stages

==== Group A ====
Rank	Competitor	MP	W	L	Points	GER	UKR	GBR	ISR
1	Jochen Wollmert (GER)	3	3	0	9:0	x	3:0	3:0	3:0
2	Mykhaylo Popov (UKR)	3	2	1	6:5	0:3	x	3:2	3:0
3	Will Bayley (GBR)	3	1	2	5:7	0:3	2:3	x	3:1
4	Shmuel Shur (ISR)	3	0	3	1:9	0:3	0:3	1:3	x

7 September, 10:00

Mykhaylo Popov (UKR)	11	11	11
Shmuel Shur (ISR)	6	7	9
Jochen Wollmert (GER)	12	11	13
Will Bayley (GBR)	10	8	11

8 September, 20:40

Mykhaylo Popov (UKR)	11	9	11	9	11
Will Bayley (GBR)	4	11	5	11	9
Jochen Wollmert (GER)	11	11	11		
Shmuel Shur (ISR)	8	3	6		

9 September, 18:40

Will Bayley (GBR)	11	11	9	11
Shmuel Shur (ISR)	9	9	11	3
Jochen Wollmert (GER)	11	11	11	
Mykhaylo Popov (UKR)	7	7	8	

==== Group B ====
Rank	Competitor	MP	W	L	Points	CHN	ESP	GBR	CZE
1	Ye Chaoqun (CHN)	3	3	0	9:1	x	3:1	3:0	3:0
2	Jordi Morales (ESP)	3	2	1	7:5	1:3	x	3:2	3:0
3	Paul Karabardak (GBR)	3	1	2	5:7	0:3	2:3	x	3:1
4	Zbynek Lambert (CZE)	3	0	3	1:9	0:3	0:3	1:3	x

7 September, 10:00

Jordi Morales (ESP)	13	9	12	12	11
Paul Karabardak (GBR)	11	11	14	10	3
Ye Chaoqun (CHN)	15	11	11		
Zbynek Lambert (CZE)	13	8	5		

8 September, 20:40

Jordi Morales (ESP)	11	11	11
Zbynek Lambert (CZE)	7	6	9
Ye Chaoqun (CHN)	11	11	11
Paul Karabardak (GBR)	8	9	7

9 September, 18:40

Paul Karabardak (GBR)	15	7	11	11
Zbynek Lambert (CZE)	13	11	8	8
Ye Chaoqun (CHN)	11	11	9	11
Jordi Morales (ESP)	5	7	11	9

==== Group C ====
Rank	Competitor	MP	W	L	Points	ESP	ITA	EGY	CHN
1	Alvaro Valera (ESP)	3	3	0	9:3	x	3:1	3:1	3:1
2	Andrea Furlan (ITA)	3	2	1	7:4	1:3	x	3:1	3:0
3	Sayed Mohamed Youssef (EGY)	3	1	2	5:6	1:3	1:3	x	3:0
4	Qin Xiaojun (CHN)	3	0	3	1:9	1:3	0:3	0:3	x

7 September, 10:00

Andrea Furlan (ITA)	13	11	9	11
Sayed Mohamed Youssef (EGY)	11	9	11	8
Alvaro Valera (ESP)	12	5	11	11
Qin Xiaojun (CHN)	10	11	8	7

8 September, 20:40

Sayed Mohamed Youssef (EGY)	11	11	11	
Qin Xiaojun (CHN)	2	5	4	
Alvaro Valera (ESP)	11	9	11	11
Andrea Furlan (ITA)	8	11	9	4

9 September, 18:40

Andrea Furlan (ITA)	13	12	11	
Qin Xiaojun (CHN)	11	10	8	
Alvaro Valera (ESP)	11	12	9	11
Sayed Mohamed Youssef (EGY)	6	10	11	8

==== Group D ====
Rank	Competitor	MP	W	L	Points	USA	FRA	POL	RSA
1	Mitchell Seidenfeld (USA)	3	2	1	7:3	x	3:0	1:3	3:0
2	Stephane Messi (FRA)	3	2	1	6:3	0:3	x	3:0	3:0
3	Adam Jurasz (POL)	3	2	1	6:5	3:1	0:3	x	3:1
4	Johan du Plooy (RSA)	3	0	3	1:9	0:3	0:3	1:3	x

7 September, 10:00

Adam Jurasz (POL)	11	11	8	11
Mitchell Seidenfeld (USA)	7	6	11	7
Stephane Messi (FRA)	11	11	11	
Johan du Plooy (RSA)	8	3	6	

8 September, 20:40

Adam Jurasz (POL)	11	10	11	11
Johan du Plooy (RSA)	4	12	6	7
Mitchell Seidenfeld (USA)	11	11	13	
Stephane Messi (FRA)	8	5	11	

9 September, 18:40

Mitchell Seidenfeld (USA)	11	11	13
Johan du Plooy (RSA)	7	7	11
Stephane Messi (FRA)	11	11	11
Adam Jurasz (POL)	9	7	8

=== Competition bracket ===
Semifinals: 10 Sep 12:15
Jochen Wollmert (GER)	12	12	13	11
Alvaro Valera (ESP)	14	10	11	6
Mitchell Seidenfeld (USA)	9	4	13
Ye Chaoqun (CHN)	11	11	15

Gold medal match: 11 Sep 10:45
Jochen Wollmert (GER)	11	12	10	11
Ye Chaoqun (CHN)	3	10	12	9
Bronze medal match: 11 Sep 10:45
Alvaro Valera (ESP)	13	16	7	11
Mitchell Seidenfeld (USA)	11	14	11	5
