= Table tennis at the 2004 Summer Paralympics – Men's individual – Class 7 =

Table Tennis - Men's Singles 7 at the XII Paralympic Games
- Paralympic Table Tennis
- Venue: Galatsi Olympic Hall
- Dates: 18–21 September 2004
- Competitors: 12 from 10 nations

Medalists
1st place, gold medalist(s)		Stéphane Messi	France
2nd place, silver medalist(s)		Jochen Wollmert	Germany
3rd place, bronze medalist(s)		Jordi Morales	Spain

The Men's Singles 7 table tennis competition at the 2004 Summer Paralympics was held from 18 to 21 September at the Galatsi Olympic Hall.

Classes 6–10 were for athletes with a physical impairment who competed from a standing position; the lower the number, the greater the impact the impairment had on an athlete's ability to compete.

The event was won by Stéphane Messi, representing France.

== Results ==
=== Preliminaries ===
Qualified for final round

==== Group A ====
Rank	Competitor	MP	W	L	Points	GER	CHN	UKR	SWE
1	Jochen Wollmert (GER)	3	3	0	9:1	x	3:0	3:1	3:0
2	Qin Xiao Jun (CHN)	3	2	1	6:4	0:3	x	3:1	3:0
3	Mikhailo Popov (UKR)	3	1	2	5:7	1:3	1:3	x	3:1
4	Linus Loennberg (SWE)	3	0	3	1:9	0:3	0:3	1:3	x

==== Group B ====
Rank	Competitor	MP	W	L	Points	FRA	GER	POL	UKR
1	Stéphane Messi (FRA)	3	3	0	9:1	x	3:0	3:0	3:1
2	Dieter Meyer (GER)	3	2	1	6:4	0:3	x	3:0	3:1
3	Adam Jurasz (POL)	3	1	2	3:6	0:3	0:3	x	3:0
4	Dmytro Bidnyy (UKR)	3	0	3	2:9	1:3	1:3	0:3	x

==== Group C ====
Rank	Competitor	MP	W	L	Points	ITA	ESP	CZE	BRA
1	Andrea Furlan (ITA)	3	3	0	9:2	x	3:2	3:0	3:0
2	Jordi Morales (ESP)	3	2	1	8:5	2:3	x	3:0	3:2
3	Milan Duracka (CZE)	3	1	2	3:7	0:3	0:3	x	3:1
4	Cristovam Lima (BRA)	3	0	3	3:9	0:3	2:3	1:3	x

=== Competition bracket ===
Quarterfinals
Dieter Meyer (GER)	0
Andrea Furlan (ITA)	3
Qin Xiao Jun (CHN)	2
Jordi Morales (ESP)	3

Semifinals
Jochen Wollmert (GER)	3
Andrea Furlan (ITA)	1
Jordi Morales (ESP)	0
Stéphane Messi (FRA)	3

Finals
Jochen Wollmert (GER)	2
Stéphane Messi (FRA)	3
Third place
Andrea Furlan (ITA)	0
Jordi Morales (ESP)	3
