= Table tennis at the 2008 Summer Paralympics – Men's individual – Class 6 =

Men's Individual Class 6 at the XIII Paralympic Games
- Venue: Peking University Gymnasium
- Dates: 7 – 11 September 2008
- Competitors: 16 from 13 nations

Medalists
1st place, gold medalist(s)		Peter Rosenmeier	Denmark
2nd place, silver medalist(s)		Daniel Arnold	Germany
3rd place, bronze medalist(s)		Nico Blok	Netherlands

The Men's Individual Class 6 table tennis competition at the 2008 Summer Paralympics was held between 7 September and 11 September at the Peking University Gymnasium.

Classes 6–10 were for athletes with a physical impairment who competed from a standing position; the lower the number, the greater the impact the impairment had on an athlete's ability to compete.

The event was won by Peter Rosenmeier, representing Denmark.

== Results ==
=== Preliminary round ===
Qualified for the knock-out stages

==== Group A ====
Rank	Competitor	MP	W	L	Points	GER	RUS	CRO	CHN
1	Daniel Arnold (GER)	3	3	0	9:2	x	3:0	3:0	3:2
2	Alexander Esaulov (RUS)	3	2	1	6:6	0:3	x	3:1	3:2
3	Vjekoslav Gregorovic (CRO)	3	1	2	4:8	0:3	1:3	x	3:2
4	Chen Chao (CHN)	3	0	3	6:9	2:3	2:3	2:3	x

7 September, 10:40

Alexander Esaulov (RUS)	12	5	11	11	
Vjekoslav Gregorovic (CRO)	10	11	6	8	
Daniel Arnold (GER)	11	12	6	11	12
Chen Chao (CHN)	3	10	11	13	10

8 September, 20:00

Alexander Esaulov (RUS)	8	10	11	11	12
Chen Chao (CHN)	11	12	9	8	10
Daniel Arnold (GER)	11	11	11		
Vjekoslav Gregorovic (CRO)	8	4	7		

9 September, 18:00

Vjekoslav Gregorovic (CRO)	11	6	11	7	11
Chen Chao (CHN)	6	11	9	11	6
Daniel Arnold (GER)	11	11	11		
Alexander Esaulov (RUS)	6	9	8		

==== Group B ====
Rank	Competitor	MP	W	L	Points	DEN	RUS	RSA	CRC
1	Peter Rosenmeier (DEN)	3	3	0	9:1	x	3:1	3:0	3:0
2	Vadim Buzin (RUS)	3	2	1	7:5	1:3	x	3:0	3:2
3	Pieter du Plooy (RSA)	3	1	2	3:6	0:3	0:3	x	3:0
4	Domingo Arguello Garcia (CRC)	3	0	3	2:9	0:3	2:3	0:3	x

7 September, 10:40

Vadim Buzin (RUS)	10	11	9	14	11
Domingo Arguello Garcia (CRC)	12	7	11	12	6
Peter Rosenmeier (DEN)	11	11	11		
Pieter du Plooy (RSA)	2	1	8		

8 September, 20:00

Vadim Buzin (RUS)	11	11	11
Pieter du Plooy (RSA)	4	0	4
Peter Rosenmeier (DEN)	11	11	11
Domingo Arguello Garcia (CRC)	7	4	1

9 September, 18:00

Pieter du Plooy (RSA)	11	13	11	
Domingo Arguello Garcia (CRC)	9	11	6	
Peter Rosenmeier (DEN)	11	8	11	11
Vadim Buzin (RUS)	5	11	9	5

==== Group C ====
Rank	Competitor	MP	W	L	Points	NED	DEN	THA	SWE
1	Nico Blok (NED)	3	3	0	9:4	x	3:2	3:0	3:2
2	Michal Jensen (DEN)	3	2	1	8:5	2:3	x	3:1	3:1
3	Rungroj Thainiyom (THA)	3	1	2	4:6	0:3	1:3	x	3:0
4	Simon Itkonen (SWE)	3	0	3	3:9	2:3	1:3	0:3	x

7 September, 10:40

Nico Blok (NED)	11	9	6	16	11
Michal Jensen (DEN)	8	11	11	14	5
Rungroj Thainiyom (THA)	11	11	13		
Simon Itkonen (SWE)	3	5	11		

8 September, 20:00

Michal Jensen (DEN)	11	9	11	11	
Rungroj Thainiyom (THA)	9	11	9	4	
Nico Blok (NED)	18	11	11	9	11
Simon Itkonen (SWE)	20	5	9	11	7

9 September, 18:00

Nico Blok (NED)	11	11	11	
Rungroj Thainiyom (THA)	5	3	7	
Michal Jensen (DEN)	11	11	7	11
Simon Itkonen (SWE)	8	3	11	4

==== Group D ====
Rank	Competitor	MP	W	L	Points	GBR	GER	POL	BRA
1	Dave Wetherill (GBR)	3	2	1	8:4	x	3:1	2:3	3:0
2	Rainer Schmidt (GER)	3	2	1	7:3	1:3	x	3:0	3:0
3	Miroslaw Kowalski (POL)	3	2	1	6:6	3:2	0:3	x	3:1
4	Carlo Franco Michell (BRA)	3	0	3	1:9	0:3	0:3	1:3	x

7 September, 10:40

Dave Wetherill (GBR)	11	6	11	11
Rainer Schmidt (GER)	8	11	7	7
Miroslaw Kowalski (POL)	7	11	11	11
Carlo Franco Michell (BRA)	11	8	9	7

8 September, 20:00

Rainer Schmidt (GER)	11	11	11		
Carlo Franco Michell (BRA)	8	6	7		
Miroslaw Kowalski (POL)	8	11	11	9	11
Dave Wetherill (GBR)	11	7	9	11	7

9 September, 18:00

Dave Wetherill (GBR)	11	11	11
Carlo Franco Michell (BRA)	5	4	4
Rainer Schmidt (GER)	11	11	11
Miroslaw Kowalski (POL)	9	8	9

=== Competition bracket ===
Semifinals: 10 Sep 12:15
Daniel Arnold (GER)	11	12	7	11
Nico Blok (NED)	6	10	11	6
Rainer Schmidt (GER)	2	12	8	11	6
Peter Rosenmeier (DEN)	11	10	11	8	11

Gold medal match: 11 Sep 16:45
Daniel Arnold (GER)	9	6	13	6
Peter Rosenmeier (DEN)	11	11	11	11
Bronze medal match: 11 Sep 16:45
Nico Blok (NED)	11	4	11	11
Rainer Schmidt (GER)	8	11	6	5
