= Germany at the 2008 Summer Paralympics =

- IPC code: GER
- NPC: National Paralympic Committee Germany
- Website: www.dbs-npc.de (in German)

in Beijing
- Competitors: 171 in 16 sports
- Flag bearer: Cornelia Dietz
- Officials: Dr. Karl Quade
- Medals Ranked 11th: Gold 14 Silver 25 Bronze 20 Total 59

Summer Paralympics appearances (overview)
- 1960; 1964; 1968; 1972; 1976; 1980; 1984; 1988; 1992; 1996; 2000; 2004; 2008; 2012; 2016; 2020; 2024

Other related appearances
- East Germany (1984)

Germany competed at the 2008 Summer Paralympics in Beijing.

German competitors took part in table tennis and sailing events, among others.

== Medallists ==
Medal	Name	Sport	Event	Date
Gold	Wojtek Czyz	Athletics	Men's Long Jump - F42/44	16th
Gold	Matthias Schroder	Athletics	Men's 400 m - T12	
Gold	Marianne Buggenhagen	Athletics	Women's Discus Throw - F54-56	9th
Gold	Katrin Green	Athletics	Women's 200 m - T44	
Gold	Martina Willing	Athletics	Women's Javelin Throw - F54-56	
Gold	Wolfgang Sacher	Cycling	Men's Individual Road Time Trial - LC1	
Gold	Michael Teuber	Cycling	Men's Individual Road Time Trial - LC4	
Gold	Andrea Eskau	Cycling	Women's Individual Road Race - HC A-C	
Gold	Hannelore Brenner	Equestrian	Women's Individual Championship Test - Grade III	9th
Gold	Hannelore Brenner	Equestrian	Women's Individual Freestyle Test - Grade III	11th
Gold	Britta Näpel	Equestrian	Women's Individual Championship Test - Grade II	
Gold	Jens Kroker; Siegmund Mainka; Robert Prem	Sailing	3-Person Keelboat (Sonar)	
Gold	Kirsten Bruhn	Swimming	Women's 100 m Breaststroke - SB5	12th
Gold	Jochen Wollmert	Table tennis	Men's Singles - TT7	
Silver	Mathias Mester	Athletics	Men's Shot Put - F40	15th
Silver	Heinrich Popow	Athletics	Men's 100 m - T42	
Silver	Thomas Ulbricht	Athletics	Men's Pentathlon - P12	
Silver	Frances Herrmann	Athletics	Women's Discus Throw - F32-34/51-53	
Silver	Andrea Hegen	Athletics	Women's Javelin Throw - F42-46	
Silver	Claudia Nicoleitzik	Athletics	Women's 200 m - T36	
Silver	Claudia Nicoleitzik	Athletics	Women's 100 m - T36	16th
Silver	Birgit Pohl	Athletics	Women's Shot Put - F32-34/52-53	15th
Silver	Martina Willing	Athletics	Women's Shot Put - F54-56	
Silver	Wolfgang Sacher	Cycling	Men's Individual Track Pursuit - LC1	
Silver	Michael Teuber	Cycling	Men's Individual Track Pursuit - LC4	
Silver	Max Weber	Cycling	Men's Individual Road Race - HC B	
Silver	Natalie Simanowski	Cycling	Women's Individual Track Pursuit - LC3-4/CP3	
Silver	Natalie Simanowski	Cycling	Women's Individual Track Time Trial - LC3-4/CP3	
Silver	Barbara Weise	Cycling	Mixed Individual Road Time Trial - CP1-2	
Silver	Hannelore Brenner; Britta Näpel; Angelika Trabert; Steffen Zeibig	Equestrian	Team	
Silver	Ramona Brussig	Judo	Women's -57 kg - B1-3	
Silver	Norbert Gau	Shooting	Men's R1-10 m Air Rifle Standing - SH1	
Silver	Manuela Schmermund	Shooting	Women's R2-10m Air Rifle Standing - SH1	7th
Silver	Thomas Grimm	Swimming	Men's 100 m Breaststroke - SB5	
Silver	Kirsten Bruhn	Swimming	Women's 100 m Backstroke - S7	10th
Silver	Maria Götze	Swimming	Women's 200 m Individual Medley - SM6	7th
Silver	Daniel Arnold	Table tennis	Men's Singles - TT6	
Silver	Monika Sikora-Weinmann; Andrea Zimmerer	Table tennis	Women's Team - TT4-5	16th
Silver	Women's Wheelchair Basketball Team: Alke Behrens; Maren Butterbrodt; Annette Kahl; Britta Kautz; Simone Kues; Birgit Meitner; Marina Mohnen; Edina Müller; Nora Schratz; Gesche Schünemann; Nicole Seifert; Annika Zeyen	Wheelchair Basketball	Women's Tournament	15th
Bronze	Marianne Buggenhagen	Athletics	Women's Shot Put - F54-56	8th
Bronze	Michaela Floeth	Athletics	Women's Shot Put - F42-46	
Bronze	Astrid Höfte	Athletics	Women's Long Jump - F44	
Bronze	Thomas Loosch	Athletics	Men's Shot Put - F37-38	
Bronze	Birgit Pohl	Athletics	Women's Javelin Throw - F33-34/52-53	
Bronze	Maria Seifert	Athletics	Women's 100m - T37	
Bronze	Maria Seifert	Athletics	Women's 200m - T37	
Bronze	Tobias Graf	Cycling	Men's Individual Track Pursuit - LC3	
Bronze	Wolfgang Sacher	Cycling	Men's Individual Track Time Trial - LC1	
Bronze	Dorothee Vieth	Cycling	Women's Individual Road Time Trial - HC A-C	
Bronze	Dorothee Vieth	Cycling	Women's Individual Road Race - HC A-C	
Bronze	Bettina Eistel	Equestrian	Individual Championship Test - Grade III	
Bronze	Britta Näpel	Equestrian	Individual Freestyle Test - Grade II	
Bronze	Carmen Brussig	Judo	Women's −48 kg - B1-3	7th
Bronze	Kirsten Bruhn	Swimming	Women's 50 m Freestyle - S7	14th
Bronze	Kirsten Bruhn	Swimming	Women's 100 m Freestyle - S7	8th
Bronze	Kirsten Bruhn	Swimming	Women's 400 m Freestyle - S7	11th
Bronze	Maria Götze	Swimming	Women's 400 m Freestyle - S6	
Bronze	Daniela Schulte	Swimming	Women's 100 m Freestyle - S11	
Bronze	Andrea Zimmerer	Table tennis	Women's Singles - TT5	

== Archery ==
5 competitors:

Men

Athlete	Class	Event	Ranking Round		1/16 Finals	1/8 Finals	Quarterfinals	Semifinals	Final	
Athlete	Class	Event	Score	Seed	Opposition Score	Opposition Score	Opposition Score	Opposition Score	Opposition Score	Rank
Michael Arenz	Open	Individual compound	670	13	Heary (IRL); L 104-108	did not advance				
Mario Oehme	W1/W2	Individual recurve	611	11	Yoshida (JPN); L 74-89	did not advance				

Women

Athlete	Class	Event	Ranking Round		1/16 Finals	1/8 Finals	Quarterfinals	Semifinals	Final	
Athlete	Class	Event	Score	Seed	Opposition Score	Opposition Score	Opposition Score	Opposition Score	Opposition Score	Rank
Maria Droste	W1/W2	Individual recurve	496	16	Cerna (CZE); W 89-87	Xiao (CHN); L 66-91	did not advance			
Katharina Schett	ST	Individual recurve	520	18	Lucas (GBR); L 70-85	did not advance				
Tanja Schultz	W1/W2	Individual recurve	524	10	Bye	Cao (CHN); L 65-79	did not advance			
Maria Droste; Katharina Schett; Tanja Schultz	Open	Team recurve	N/A				China; L 165-187	did not advance		

== Athletics ==
=== Men ===
Athlete	Class	Event	Heats		Semifinal		Final		
Athlete	Class	Event	Result	Rank	Result	Rank	Result	Points	Rank
Alhassane Baldé	T54	400 m	50.68	6	did not advance				
Alhassane Baldé	T54	800 m	1:41.22	5	did not advance				
Alhassane Baldé	T54	1500 m	3:10.99	7	did not advance				
Max Bergmann	T13	5000 m	15:29.33	4 q	N/A		15:28.06	-	5
Reinhold Bötzel	F44/46 (F46)	High jump	N/A				1.87	935	6
Ralph Brunner	T54	5000 m	10:23.71	5	did not advance				
Ralph Brunner	T54	1500 m	3:08.73	4 Q	3:10.51	7	did not advance		
Ralph Brunner	T54	Marathon	N/A				1:23:27	-	10
Wojtek Czyz	F42/44 (F42)	Long Jump	N/A				6.50 WR	1101	Gold medal
Jörg Frischmann	F44	Shot put	N/A				13.75	858	7
Ali Ghardooni	F57-58 (F57)	Discus throw	N/A				44.69	958	4
Siegmund Hegeholz	F11/12 (F11)	Javelin throw	N/A				43.18	882	7
Ulrich Iser	F55-56 (F55)	Shot put	N/A				10.81	955	9
Lutz Langer	F40	Shot put	N/A				9.12	-	12
Marc Lembeck	T13	400 m	52.09	5	did not advance				
Marc Lembeck	T13	200 m	24.43	6	did not advance				
Thomas Loosch	F37-38 (F38)	Shot put	N/A				14.44	968	Bronze medal
Thomas Loosch	F37-38 (F38)	Discus throw	N/A				39.40	884	8
Mathias Mester	F40	Shot put	N/A				11.16	-	Silver medal
Heinrich Popow	T42	100 m	N/A				12.98	-	Silver medal
Heinrich Popow	F42/44; F42	Long jump	N/A				No mark	-	-
Matthias Schmidt	T11	200 m	25.10	3	did not advance				
Matthias Schmidt	T11	400 m	55.38	3	did not advance				
René Schramm	T37	100 m	12.43	1 Q	N/A		12.50	-	6
René Schramm	T37	200 m	25.49	3 Q	N/A		25.37	-	6
Matthias Schröder	T12	100 m	11.18	1 Q	11.17	3 q	11.23 (Final B)	-	7
Matthias Schröder	T12	400 m	50.47	1 Q	50.11	1 Q	49.45	-	Gold medal
Matthias Schröder	T12	200 m	22.91	1 Q	22.73	3 q	22.71 (Final B)	-	7
Marc Schuh	T54	400 m	49.05	2 Q	54.46	8	did not advance		
Marc Schuh	T54	200 m	26.14	4	did not advance				
Marc Schuh	T54	100 m	14.98	4	did not advance				
Niels Stein	T35	100 m	N/A				13.70	-	7
Frank Tinnemeier	F42	Shot put	N/A				11.47	-	13
Jörg Trippen-Hilgers	F12	Long jump	N/A				5.88	-	13
Thomas Ulbricht	F11/12 (F12)	Javelin throw	N/A				46.85	828	9
Thomas Ulbricht	F12	Long jump	N/A				6.33	-	10
Matthias Schmidt; Matthias Schröder; Jörg Trippen-Hilgers; Thomas Ulbricht	T11-13	4 × 100 m relay	45.35	2	did not advance				

Pentathlon

Athlete	Class	Event	Long jump			Javelin throw			100 m			Discus throw			1500 m			Total	Rank
Athlete	Class	Event	Result	Points	Rank	Result	Points	Rank	Time	Points	Rank	Result	Points	Rank	Time	Points	Rank	Total	Rank
Jörg Trippen-Hilgers	P12	Pentathlon	6.24	639	8	42.22	474	8	12.11	629	10	34.54	554	2	5:31.29	393	11	2689	10
Thomas Ulbricht	P12	Pentathlon	6.58	716	4	47.80	556	3	11.49	755	4	30.40	472	6	4:40.16	679	6	3178	Silver medal

=== Women ===
Athlete	Class	Event	Heats		Semifinal		Final		
Athlete	Class	Event	Result	Rank	Result	Rank	Result	Points	Rank
Claudia Biene	F42-46 (F42)	Javelin throw	N/A				29.07	989	7
Claudia Biene	F42-46 (F42)	Discus throw	N/A				28.55	938	5
Claudia Biene	F42	Long jump	N/A				2.78	-	8
Claudia Biene	T42	100 m	N/A				18.92	-	7
Marianne Buggenhagen	F54-56 (F55)	Shot put	N/A				8.54	1026	Bronze medal
Marianne Buggenhagen	F54-56 (F55)	Discus throw	N/A				27.80 WR	1060	Gold medal
Marianne Buggenhagen	F54-56 (F55)	Javelin throw	N/A				17.64	994	8
Siena Christen	F12-13 (F12)	Shot put	N/A				10.49	841	7
Siena Christen	F12-13 (F12)	Discus throw	N/A				36.60	860	4
Laura Darimont	T46	100 m	13.66	6	did not advance				
Laura Darimont	T46	200 m	28.47	8	did not advance				
Isabelle Foerder	T37	100 m	14.28	1 Q	N/A		14.54	-	4
Isabelle Foerder	T37	200 m	30.51	2 Q	N/A		30.70	-	4
Michaela Floeth	F42-46 (F44)	Shot put	N/A				12.58 WR	1034	Bronze medal
Michaela Floeth	F42-46 (F44)	Discus throw	N/A				38.87	1029	4
Katrin Green	T44	200 m	N/A				28.02	-	Gold medal
Katrin Green	T44	100 m	13.71	1 Q	N/A		13.74	-	4
Frances Herrmann	F32-34/51-53 (F34)	Discus throw	N/A				21.19 WR	1108	Silver medal
Frances Herrmann	F33-34/52-53 (F34)	Javelin throw	N/A				13.83	974	7
Frances Herrmann	F32-34/52-53 (F34)	Shot put	N/A				6.90	915	10
Andrea Hegen	F42-46 (F46)	Javelin throw	N/A				39.23 WR	1071	Silver medal
Astrid Höfte	F44	Long jump	N/A				4.67	-	Bronze medal
Astrid Höfte	T44	200 m	N/A				29.33	-	5
Astrid Höfte	T44	100 m	14.46	2 Q	N/A		14.47	-	7
Petra Hömmen	F40	Discus throw	N/A				20.29	-	7
Petra Hömmen	F40	Shot put	N/A				7.28	-	6
Annalena Knors	T12	400 m	1:02.48	3	did not advance				
Annalena Knors	T12	200 m	27.89	3	did not advance				
Katrin Müller-Rottgardt	T13	400 m	1:00.49	4 q	N/A		1:00.34	-	6
Katrin Müller-Rottgardt	T13	100 m	12.96	3 q	N/A		12.85	-	8
Katrin Müller-Rottgardt	F13	Long jump	N/A				5.24	-	5
Claudia Nicoleitzik	T36	200 m	N/A				31.48	-	Silver medal
Claudia Nicoleitzik	T36	100 m	N/A				15.00	-	Silver medal
Birgit Pohl	F32-34/51-53 (F34)	Discus throw	N/A				20.54	1074	4
Birgit Pohl	F33-34/52-53 (F34)	Javelin throw	N/A				16.36	1152	Bronze medal
Birgit Pohl	F32-34/52-53 (F34)	Shot put	N/A				8.46	1122	Silver medal
Jana Schmidt	F42-46 (F42)	Javelin throw	N/A				29.66	1009	6
Jana Schmidt	F42-46 (F42)	Shot put	N/A				9.01	966	5
Yvonne Sehmisch	T54	100 m	17.28	4 q	N/A		17.08	-	7
Yvonne Sehmisch	T54	400 m	58.32	4	did not advance				
Yvonne Sehmisch	T54	200 m	30.98	4 q	N/A		30.49	-	6
Maria Seifert	T37	100 m	14.36	2 Q	N/A		14.28	-	Bronze medal
Maria Seifert	T37	200 m	29.92	2 Q	N/A		29.99	-	Bronze medal
Tamira Slaby	T38	100 m	14.47	4 q	N/A		14.75	-	5
Tamira Slaby	T38	200 m	28.71	1 Q	N/A		30.02	-	4
Martina Willing	F54-56 (F56)	Shot put	N/A				8.61	1034	Silver medal
Martina Willing	F54-56 (F56)	Discus throw	N/A				23.36	890	6
Martina Willing	F54-56 (F56)	Javelin throw	N/A				23.99	1204	Gold medal

== Cycling ==
=== Men's track ===
Pursuit

Athlete	Class	Event	Qualifying		Final/ Bronze medal race	
Athlete	Class	Event	Time Speed (km/h)	Rank	Opposition Time Speed (km/h)	Rank
Tobias Graf	LC3	3000 m Individual pursuit	3:54.539; 46.047	3 Q	Thirionet (FRA); W 3:57.510; 45.471	Bronze medal
Klaus Lungershausen	CP4	3000 m Individual pursuit	3:52.561; 46.439	5	did not advance	
Wolfgang Sacher	LC1	4000 m Individual pursuit	4:44.375; 50.637	2 Q	Gallagher (AUS); L 4:46.788; 50.211	Silver medal
Pierre Senska	LC4	3000 m Individual pursuit	4:25.253; 40.715	5	did not advance	
Michael Teuber	LC4	3000 m Individual pursuit	4:05.932; 43.914	2 Q	Vigano (ITA); L 4:10.113; 43.180	Silver medal
Erich Winkler	LC4	3000 m Individual pursuit	4:17.736; 41.903	4 Q	Mendez (ESP); L 4:21.550; 41.292	4

Sprint

Athlete(s)	Class	Event	Qualifying		Semifinal		Final	
Athlete(s)	Class	Event	Time Speed (km/h)	Rank	Opposition Time Speed (km/h)	Rank	Opposition Time Speed (km/h)	Rank
Mario Hammer (LC1); Wolfgang Sacher (LC1); Pierre Senska (LC4)	LC1-4/ CP3-4	Team	54.876; 49.201	5	N/A		did not advance	

Time trial

Athlete	Class	Event	Time	Class Factor	Factorized Time	Rank
Tobias Graf	LC3-4 (LC3)	1 km time trial	1:18.515	1.00000	1:18.515	5
Mario Hammer	LC1	1 km time trial	1:11.335	-	-	6
Wolfgang Sacher	LC1	1 km time trial	1:10.812	-	-	Bronze medal
Pierre Senska	LC3-4 (LC4)	1 km time trial	1:27.161	0.95718	1:23.428	13
Michael Teuber	LC3-4 (LC4)	1 km time trial	1:22.473	0.95718	1:18.941	7
Erich Winkler	LC3-4 (LC4)	1 km time trial	1:26.757	0.95718	1:23.042	12

=== Men's road ===
Athlete	Class	Event	Time	Rank
Stefan Baumann	HC B	Time trial	22:44.21 (+37.98)	4
Stefan Baumann	HC B	Road race	1:36:36 (+8:11)	12
Torben Bröer	HC A	Time trial	35:02.87 (+5:05.10)	4
Tobias Graf	LC3	Time trial	38:55.25 (+54.94)	5
Tobias Graf	LC3-4/CP3 (LC3)	Road race	1:38:01 (+1:01)	4
Tobias Knecht	HC B	Time trial	23:08.91 (+1:02.68)	8
Tobias Knecht	HC B	Road race	1:30:24 (+1:59)	6
Klaus Lungershausen	CP4	Time trial	36:52.33 (+58.35)	5
Klaus Lungershausen	LC1-2/CP4 (CP4)	Road race	1:46:13 (+0:10)	9
Norbert Mosandl	HC C	Time trial	21:33.09 (+1:16.57)	5
Norbert Mosandl	HC C	Road race	1:29:31 (+7:51)	6
Norbert Koch	HC C	Time trial	21:59.90 (+1:43.38)	7
Norbert Koch	HC C	Road race	1:42:46 (+21:06)	10
Wolfgang Sacher	LC1	Time trial	34:41.62	Gold medal
Wolfgang Sacher	LC1-2/CP4 (LC1)	Road race	1:48:47 (+2:44)	17
Pierre Senska	LC4	Time trial	44:18.16 (+5:31.37)	6
Pierre Senska	LC3-4/CP3 (LC4)	Road race	1:47:03 (+10:03)	20
Michael Teuber	LC4	Time trial	38:46.79	Gold medal
Michael Teuber	LC3-4/CP3 (LC4)	Road race	1:39:15 (+2:15)	17
Max Weber	HC B	Time trial	23:08.88 (+1:02.65)	7
Max Weber	HC B	Road race	1:28:26 (+0:01)	Silver medal
Erich Winkler	LC4	Time trial	42:42.91 (+3:56.12)	5
Erich Winkler	LC3-4/CP3 (LC4)	Road race	1:55:40 (+18:40)	25

=== Women's track ===
Pursuit

Athlete	Class	Event	Qualifying				Final			
Athlete	Class	Event	Time	Class Factor	Factorized Time	Rank	Time	Class Factor	Factorized Time	Rank
Natalie Simanowski	LC3-4/CP3 (LC3)	Individual	4:16.176 WR	1.00000	4:16.176	2 Q	4:19.396	1.00000	4:19.396	Silver medal

Time trial

Athlete	Class	Event	Time	Class Factor	Factorized Time	Rank
Natalie Simanowski	LC3-4/CP3 (LC3)	500 m time trial	43.800	1.00000	43.800	Silver medal

=== Women's road ===
Athlete	Class	Event	Time	Class Factor	Factorized Time	Rank
Andrea Eskau	HC A-C (HC C)	Time trial	24:06.03	1.00000	24:06.03	5
Andrea Eskau	HC A-C (HC C)	Road race	1:13:00	-	-	Gold medal
Natalie Simanowski	LC3-4/CP3 (LC3)	Time trial	45:38.23	1.00000	45:38.23	4
Dorothee Vieth	HC A-C (HC C)	Time trial	23:41.95	1.00000	23:41.95	Bronze medal
Dorothee Vieth	HC A-C (HC C)	Road race	1:13:27 (+0:27)	-	-	Bronze medal
Barbara Weise	CP1-2 (CP2)	Mixed time trial	28:52.76	0.81277	23:28.33	Silver medal
Barbara Weise	CP1-2 (CP2)	Mixed road race	57:15 (+12:10)	-	-	8

== Equestrian ==
Individual

Athlete	Class	Horse	Event	Result	Rank
Hannelore Brenner	Grade III	Women of the World	Championship Test	71.440	Gold medal
Hannelore Brenner	Grade III	Women of the World	Freestyle Test	74.223	Gold medal
Bettina Eistel	Grade III	Fabuleux 5	Championship Test	70.880	Bronze medal
Bettina Eistel	Grade III	Fabuleux 5	Freestyle Test	69.612	6
Britta Näpel	Grade II	Cherubin 15	Championship Test	71.909	Gold medal
Britta Näpel	Grade II	Cherubin 15	Freestyle Test	70.277	Bronze medal
Angelika Trabert	Grade II	Londria 2	Championship Test	64.909	8
Angelika Trabert	Grade II	Londria 2	Freestyle Test	60.778	14
Steffen Zeibig	Grade II	Waldemar 27	Championship Test	66.091	5
Steffen Zeibig	Grade II	Waldemar 27	Freestyle Test	64.667	10

Team

Athletes	Class	Horses	Event	Team Test			Championship Test			Total	Rank
Athletes	Class	Horses	Event	Result	Team Total	Rank	Result	Team Total	Rank	Total	Rank
Hannelore Brenner; Britta Näpel; Angelika Trabert; Steffen Zeibig	Grade III; Grade II; Grade II; Grade II	Women of the World; Cherubin 15; Londria 2 Waldemar 27	Team	71.615; 62.667# 69.429; 63.048	204.092	2	71.440; 71.909; 64.909# 66.091	209.440	2	413.532	Silver medal

'#' denotes scores that did not count toward the team total.

== Goalball ==
6 competitors:

Women

- Natalie Ball
- Conny Dietz
- Ina Fischer
- Christiane Möller
- Swetlana Otto
- Stefanie Schindler

Preliminary round

September 7
21:00

Denmark	4 – 1	Germany
Vedsted – 3 Own Goal– 1	Report	Fischer – 1 (Penalty)

BIT Gymnasium, Beijing
Referee: Balint Benko (Hungary), Sivert Sivertsen (Sweden)

September 8
13:00

China	3 – 0	Germany
Xu – 2 Chen – 1 (Penalty)	Report

BIT Gymnasium, Beijing
Referee: Eeva Sorkkila (Finland), Patricia Fras (Slovenia)

September 9
13:00

Brazil	3 – 1	Germany
Santos – 2 Amorim – 1	Report	Schindler – 1

BIT Gymnasium, Beijing
Referee: Keith Lound (Great Britain), Balint Benko (Hungary)

September 10
11:00

Germany	0 – 1	Canada
	Report	Morin – 1

BIT Gymnasium, Beijing
Referee: Patrick Gafney (USA), Kari Rasanen (Finland)

September 11
18:00

Germany	0 – 4	United States
	Report	Armbruster – 2 Miller – 2

BIT Gymnasium, Beijing
Referee: Nejc Jakic (Slovenia), Claude Dagenais (Canada)

September 12
19:00

Germany	5 – 10	Sweden
Schindler – 2 Fischer – 2 (1 Penalty); Otto – 1	Report	Gustavsson – 5 (1 Penalty), Jalmestal – 5 (1 Penalty)

BIT Gymnasium, Beijing
Referee: Lena Bonke (Denmark), Kari Rasanen (Finland)

September 13
10:00

Germany	1 – 2	Japan
Schindler – 1	Report	Komiya – 1 Adachi – 1

BIT Gymnasium, Beijing
Referee: Balint Benko (Hungary), Kari Rasanen (Finland)

Group table

Team	Pld	W	L	D	GF	GA	GD	Pts
China	7	6	0	1	21	7	+14	19
United States	7	4	1	2	18	11	+7	14
Denmark	7	4	1	2	13	9	+4	14
Sweden	7	3	3	1	30	27	+3	10
Canada	7	2	2	3	15	13	+2	9
Brazil	7	2	4	1	21	24	-3	7
Japan	7	2	5	0	8	16	-8	6
Germany	7	0	7	0	8	27	-19	0

== Judo ==
=== Men ===
Athlete	Event	Preliminary	Quarterfinals	Semifinals	Repechage Round 1	Repechage Round 2	Final/ Bronze medal contest
Athlete	Event	Opposition Result	Opposition Result	Opposition Result	Opposition Result	Opposition Result	Opposition Result
Sebastian Junk	−90 kg	Bye	Mammadov (AZE); L 0001-0003	Did not advance	Stoškus (LTU); W 1102-0000	Ingram (GBR); L 0010-0110	Did not advance
Matthias Krieger	−73 kg	Biezais (LAT); W 1001-0000	Sydorenko (UKR); L 0000-0013	Did not advance	N/A	Aliyev (AZE); W 0110-0011	Ramirez (ARG); L 0000-1000
Dominik Zilian	+100 kg	Taurines (FRA); L 0000-1000	did not advance				

=== Women ===
Athlete	Event	Preliminary	Quarterfinals	Semifinals	Repechage Round	Final/ Bronze medal contest
Athlete	Event	Opposition Result	Opposition Result	Opposition Result	Opposition Result	Opposition Result
Carmen Brussig	−48 kg	Bye	Potapova (RUS); L 0020-1000	Did not advance	Garcia (ESP); W 1000-0000	Gonzalez (CUB); W 1000-0000
Ramona Brussig	−57 kg	N/A	Cete (TUR); W 0010-0000	Karkar (ALG); W 0011-0000	N/A	Wang (CHN); L 0014-1000

== Powerlifting ==
Athlete	Event	Result	Rank
Mario Hochberg	+100 kg	210.0	5

== Rowing ==
Athletes	Class	Event	Heats		Repechage		Final A/B		Total Rank
Athletes	Class	Event	Result	Rank	Result	Rank	Result	Rank	Total Rank
Harald Wimmer; Siglind Koehler	TA	Mixed double sculls	4:44.67	5	4:59.69	4 QFB	4:49.05	3	9
Kathrin Wolff; Marcus Klemp; Michael Sauer; Susanne Lackner; Arne Maury (Cox)	LTA	Mixed coxed four	3:39.02	2	3:50.79	2 QFA	3:41.71	4	4

== Sailing ==
Athlete	Event	Race											Score	Rank
Athlete	Event	1	2	3	4	5	6	7	8	9	10	11	Score	Rank
Heiko Kröger	2.4MR	3	2	~~11~~	6	4	3	1	~~11~~	2	7	CAN	28	4
Jens Kroker; Siegmund Mainka; Robert Prem	Sonar	5	6	3	1	4	~~11~~	5	2	~~9~~	4	5	35	Gold medal

CAN - Race cancelled

== Shooting ==
=== Men ===
Athlete	Class	Event	Qualification		Final		Rank
Athlete	Class	Event	Score	Rank	Score	Total	Rank
Michael Brengmann	SH2	Mixed R5-10 m air rifle prone	598	12	did not advance		12
Michael Brengmann	SH2	Mixed R4-10 m air rifle standing	598	3 Q	102.4	700.4	6
Norbert Gau	SH1	R1-10 m air rifle standing	592	3 Q	101.7	693.7	Silver medal
Norbert Gau	SH1	R7-50 m free rifle 3x40	1104	23	did not advance		23
Norbert Gau	SH1	R3-10 m air rifle prone	590	39	did not advance		39
Harald Hack	SH1	P1-10 m air pistol	556	18	did not advance		18
Harald Hack	SH1	Mixed P3-25 m sport pistol	558	9	did not advance		9
Harald Hack	SH1	Mixed P4-50 m free pistol	513	18	did not advance		18
Frank Heitmeyer	SH1	P1-10 m air pistol	549	28	did not advance		28
Frank Heitmeyer	SH1	Mixed P3-25 m sport pistol	545	23	did not advance		23
Manuel Krüger	SH1	P1-10 m air pistol	551	26	did not advance		26
Manuel Krüger	SH1	Mixed P3-25 m sport pistol	550	20	did not advance		20
Josef Neumaier	SH1	R1-10 m air rifle standing	592	4 Q	100.0	692.0	5
Josef Neumaier	SH1	R7-50 m free rifle 3x40	1140	7 Q	98.9	1238.9	7
Josef Neumaier	SH1	R3-10 m air rifle prone	596	24	did not advance		24
Josef Neumaier	SH1	Mixed R6-50 m free rifle prone	585	11	did not advance		11
Simon Voit	SH1	R1-10 m air rifle standing	576	19	did not advance		19
Simon Voit	SH1	R7-50 m free rifle 3x40	1123	15	did not advance		15
Simon Voit	SH1	Mixed R6-50 m free rifle prone	586	9	did not advance		9

=== Women ===
Athlete	Class	Event	Qualification		Final		Rank
Athlete	Class	Event	Score	Rank	Score	Total	Rank
Sabine Brogle	SH1	R2-10 m air rifle standing	383	14	did not advance		14
Sabine Brogle	SH1	R8-50 m sport rifle 3x20	548	12	did not advance		12
Doris Kustner	SH1	P2-10 m air pistol	Disqualified		did not advance		-
Manuela Schmermund	SH1	R2-10 m air rifle standing	388	4 Q	102.2	490.2	Silver medal
Manuela Schmermund	SH1	R8-50 m sport rifle 3x20	567	7 Q	96.2	663.2	6
Manuela Schmermund	SH1	Mixed R6-50 m free rifle prone	583	19	did not advance		19

== Swimming ==
=== Men ===
Athlete	Class	Event	Heats		Final	
Athlete	Class	Event	Result	Rank	Result	Rank
Christoph Burkard	S8	100 m freestyle	1:04.99	13	did not advance	
Christoph Burkard	S8	400 m freestyle	4:45.97	4 Q	4:40.60	4
Christoph Burkard	SB7	100 m breaststroke	1:29.08	8 Q	1:29.60	8
Christoph Burkard	SM8	200 m individual medley	2:43.19	11	did not advance	
Daniel Clausner	S13	100 m butterfly	1:04.09	15	did not advance	
Daniel Clausner	S13	100 m freestyle	55.32	8 Q	55.54	8
Daniel Clausner	S13	100 m backstroke	1:06.82	6 Q	1:06.76	6
Daniel Clausner	S13	50 m freestyle	25.22	6 Q	25.39	7
Daniel Clausner	SM13	200 m individual medley	2:20.30	3 Q	2:18.96	5
Daniel Clausner	SB13	100 m breaststroke	1:10.68	3 Q	1:09.49	6
Robert Dörries	S13	400 m freestyle	4:34.71	7 Q	4:23.89	4
Robert Dörries	S13	100 m freestyle	57.19	10	did not advance	
Robert Dörries	S13	50 m freestyle	26.38	13	did not advance	
Robert Dörries	SM13	200 m individual medley	2:26.89	10	did not advance	
Christian Goldbach	S2	200 m freestyle	5:39.65	7 Q	5:37.09	7
Christian Goldbach	S2	100 m freestyle	2:47.56	9	did not advance	
Christian Goldbach	S2	50 m freestyle	1:20.99	10	did not advance	
Christian Goldbach	S2	50 m backstroke	1:22.63	9	did not advance	
Thomas Grimm	SM6	200 m individual medley	3:08.22	8 Q	3:08.90	7
Thomas Grimm	S7	400 m freestyle	5:37.00	10	did not advance	
Thomas Grimm	SB5	100 m breaststroke	1:38.15	4 Q	1:35.41	Silver medal
Nils Grunenberg	SB5	100 m breaststroke	1:34.83	2 Q	1:36.68	4
Sebastian Iwanow	S6	100 m freestyle	1:12.78	9	did not advance	
Sebastian Iwanow	S6	50 m freestyle	32.72	6 Q	32.79	7
Lucas Ludwig	S10	100 m butterfly	1:01.14	8 Q	1:00.46	7
Lucas Ludwig	S10	100 m freestyle	56.19	12	did not advance	
Lucas Ludwig	S10	100 m backstroke	1:05.61	10	did not advance	
Lucas Ludwig	S10	50 m freestyle	25.79	10	did not advance	
Lucas Ludwig	S10	400 m freestyle	4:23.24	3 Q	4:13.64	4
Lucas Ludwig	SM10	200 m individual medley	2:20.37	5 Q	2:18.93	5
Swen Michaelis	SM6	200 m individual medley	3:05.37	7 Q	Disqualified	-
Swen Michaelis	S6	100 m freestyle	1:12.14	6 Q	1:12.31	8
Swen Michaelis	S6	100 m backstroke	1:25.09	5 Q	1:23.83	6
Swen Michaelis	S6	400 m freestyle	5:27.35	5 Q	5:26.17	5
Florian Moll	SB7	100 m breaststroke	1:27.51	5 Q	1:28.31	7
Florian Moll	S9	400 m freestyle	4:30.15	8 Q	4:29.67	8
Daniel Simon	S13	100 m butterfly	1:02.30	5 Q	1:02.28	7
Daniel Simon	S13	100 m freestyle	57.98	12	did not advance	
Daniel Simon	S13	100 m backstroke	did not start			
Daniel Simon	S13	50 m freestyle	26.07	11	did not advance	
Roy Tobis	S10	100 m butterfly	1:00.18	5 Q	1:00.65	8
Roy Tobis	S10	100 m freestyle	55.55	7 Q	55.07	6
Roy Tobis	S10	100 m backstroke	1:04.63	7 Q	1:03.88	6
Roy Tobis	S10	50 m freestyle	25.21	8 Q	25.04	6
Christoph Weber	SB9	100 m breaststroke	1:15.97	10	did not advance	
Christoph Weber	SM10	200 m individual medley	2:28.49	13	did not advance	
Nikolai Willig	S8	100 m butterfly	1:13.39	13	did not advance	
Nikolai Willig	S8	100 m freestyle	1:03.69	12	did not advance	
Nikolai Willig	S8	400 m freestyle	4:49.25	5 Q	4:50.39	6
Nikolai Willig	S8	50 m freestyle	29.03	8 Q	28.94	7
Nikolai Willig	SM8	200 m individual medley	2:40.24	9	did not advance	
Lucas Ludwig; Swen Michaelis; Roy Tobis; Nikolai Willig	-34 Pts	4 × 100 m freestyle	N/A		4:04.45 (Michaelis 1:13.28; Willig 1:01.84; Tobis 54.81; Ludwig 54.52)	7
Swen Michaelis; Roy Tobis; Christoph Weber; Nikolai Willig	-34 Pts	4 × 100 m medley	4:42.48 (Michaelis 1:22.92; Weber 1:15.28; Tobis 1:01.06; Willig 1:03.22)	9	did not advance	

=== Women ===
Athlete	Class	Event	Heats		Final	
Athlete	Class	Event	Result	Rank	Result	Rank
Kirsten Bruhn	S7	100 m freestyle	N/A		1:12.93	Bronze medal
Kirsten Bruhn	S7	100 m backstroke	1:26.54	2 Q	1:25.97	Silver medal
Kirsten Bruhn	S7	400 m freestyle	5:43.32	4 Q	5:28.22	Bronze medal
Kirsten Bruhn	S7	50 m freestyle	34.77	2 Q	34.50	Bronze medal
Kirsten Bruhn	SB5	100 m breaststroke	1:36.30 WR	1 Q	1:36.92	Gold medal
Annke Conradi	S4 (S3)	100 m freestyle	2:20.93	8 Q	2:19.95	8
Annke Conradi	S3	50 m freestyle	1:07.76	5 Q	1:17.94	8
Annke Conradi	S3	50 m backstroke	1:07.61	3 Q	1:14.93	7
Maria Götze	SM6	200 m individual medley	3:25.03	5 Q	3:14.59	Silver medal
Maria Götze	S6	100 m freestyle	1:23.40	4 Q	1:19.53	4
Maria Götze	S6	100 m backstroke	1:43.11	8 Q	1:39.85	7
Maria Götze	S6	50 m butterfly	44.65	10	did not advance	
Maria Götze	S6	400 m freestyle	6:06.49	4 Q	5:49.70	Bronze medal
Maria Götze	S6	50 m freestyle	38.70	6 Q	37.28	4
Maria Götze	SB6	100 m breaststroke	1:54.28	6 Q	1:47.82	5
Julia Kabus	S8	100 m freestyle	1:12.64	6 Q	1:12.68	7
Julia Kabus	S8	400 m freestyle	5:32.76	4 Q	5:22.82	5
Julia Kabus	S8	50 m freestyle	34.44	10	did not advance	
Christiane Reppe	S9	100 m freestyle	1:06.67	10	did not advance	
Christiane Reppe	S9	400 m freestyle	4:54.25	4 Q	4:51.59	6
Christiane Reppe	S9	100 m backstroke	1:19.12	12	did not advance	
Christiane Reppe	S9	50 m freestyle	31.84	13	did not advance	
Daniela Schulte	S11	100 m freestyle	1:11.57	2 Q	1:11.08	Bronze medal
Daniela Schulte	S11	50 m freestyle	33.83	8 Q	33.05	6
Stefanie Weinberg	S8	100 m butterfly	1:23.48	10	did not advance	
Stefanie Weinberg	S8	100 m freestyle	1:14.65	10	did not advance	
Stefanie Weinberg	S8	100 m backstroke	1:27.86	8 Q	1:27.96	7
Stefanie Weinberg	S8	50 m freestyle	34.95	11	did not advance	
Stefanie Weinberg	SM8	200 m individual medley	3:04.97	11	did not advance	

== Table Tennis ==
=== Men ===
Athlete	Event	Group Match 1	Group Match 2	Group Match 3	1/8 Finals	Quarterfinals	Semifinals	Final/ Bronze medal match
Athlete	Event	Opposition Result	Opposition Result	Opposition Result	Opposition Result	Opposition Result	Opposition Result	Opposition Result
Daniel Arnold	Singles C6	Chao (CHN); W 3-2	Gregorovic (CRO); W 3-0	Esaulov (RUS); W 3-0	N/A		Blok (NED); W 3-1	Rosenmeier (DEN); L 1-3
Selcuk Cetin	Singles C4-5	Mészáros (SVK); W 3-0	Paulsen (NOR); L 2-3	did not advance				
Jan Gürtler	Singles C3	Wu (TPE); W 3-1	Kim (KOR); W 3-1	N/A		Pinas (ESP); L 1-3	did not advance	
Walter Kilger	Singles C1	Fernandez (CUB); L 0-3	Vevera (AUT); L 0-3	Cho (KOR); L 0-3	did not advance			
Dietmar Kober	Singles C4-5	Scott (USA); L 1-3	Robertson (GBR); W 3-0	N/A	Zhang (CHN); L 1-3	did not advance		
David Korn	Singles C9-10	Ruiz (ESP); L 2-3	Rozier (FRA); L 1-3	did not advance				
Holger Nikelis	Singles C1	Ducay (FRA); L 2-3	Lee (KOR); L 2-3	Trujillo (CUB); W 3-0	did not advance			
Rainer Schmidt	Singles C6	Wetherill (GBR); L 1-3	Michell (BRA); W 3-0	Kowalski (POL); W 3-0	N/A		Rosenmeier (DEN); L 2-3	Blok (NED); L 1-3
Otto Vilsmaier	Singles C2	Revucky (SVK); L 2-3	Kovalski (BRA); W 3-0	Hansen (DEN); L 0-3	did not advance			
Jochen Wollmert	Singles C7	Bayley (GBR); W 3-0	Shur (ISR); W 3-0	Popov (UKR); W 3-0	N/A		Valera (ESP); W 3-1	Ye (CHN); W 3-1
Holger Nikelis; Otto Vilsmaier	Team C1-2	N/A				France; L 0-3	did not advance	
Selcuk Cetin; Jan Gürtler; Dietmar Kober	Team C4-5	N/A			Hong Kong; W 3-2	France; L 0-3	did not advance	
Daniel Arnold; Jochen Wollmert	Team C6-8	N/A			Chinese Taipei; W 3-0	China; L 2-3	did not advance	

=== Women ===
Athlete	Event	Group Match 1	Group Match 2	Group Match 3	1/8 Finals	Quarterfinals	Semifinals	Final/ Bronze medal match
Athlete	Event	Opposition Result	Opposition Result	Opposition Result	Opposition Result	Opposition Result	Opposition Result	Opposition Result
Monika Sikora-Weinmann	Singles C4	Arenales (MEX); W 3-0	Sacca (ITA); W 3-0	Jung (KOR); W 3-0	N/A		Peric (SRB); L 2-3	Moon (KOR); L 1-3
Andrea Zimmerer	Singles C5	Barszcz (POL); W 3-0	Chan (HKG); W 3-0	Zhang (CHN); W 3-1	N/A		Gu (CHN); L 1-3	Abuawad (JOR); W 3-0
Monika Sikora-Weinmann; Andrea Zimmerer	Team C4-5	N/A			Bye	Slovenia; W 3-1	Serbia; W 3-1	China; L 1-3

== Wheelchair Basketball ==
Men

- André Bienek
- Lars Christink
- Ahmet Coskun
- Florian Fischer
- Dirk Köhler-Lenz
- Andreas Kreß
- Lars Lehmann
- Björn Lohmann
- Dirk Passiwan
- Mimoun Quali
- Jens Schürmann
- Sebastian Wolk

Preliminary round - Group A

September 7
20:45

Report

Germany	59–62	Canada
Scoring by quarter: 13-17, 13-6, 17-19, 16-20
Pts: Passiwan 11; Rebs: Köhler-Lenz 12; Asts: Christink 2, Coskun 2		Pts: Anderson 29; Rebs: Anderson 12; Asts: Anderson 5

National Indoor Stadium, Beijing
Attendance: 11,797
Referees: Juan Manuel Urunuela (Spain)

September 8
18:30

Report

Germany	56–58	Japan
Scoring by quarter: 12-18, 17-14, 14-14, 13-12
Pts: Coskun 13; Rebs: Köhler-Lenz 9 Asts: Lehmann 6		Pts: Kozai 20; Rebs: Fujimoto 15; Asts: Fujimoto 2, Kozai 2, Kyoya 2

National Indoor Stadium, Beijing
Attendance: 8,580
Referees: Sergio Giordano (Canada)

September 9
12:15

Report

South Africa	43–96	Germany
Scoring by quarter: 8-21, 8-25, 10-26, 17-24
Pts: Nortje 19; Rebs: Taylor 7, Nortje 7, Nel 7 Asts: Curle 2		Pts: Passiwan 22; Rebs: Köhler-Lenz 5, Bienek 5 Asts: Christink 7

USTB Gymnasium, Beijing
Attendance: 1,095
Referees: Andre Bosveld (Netherlands)

September 10
13:30

Report

Germany	73–63	Iran
Scoring by quarter: 10-15, 29-14, 22-13, 12-21
Pts: Köhler-Lenz 23; Rebs: Köhler-Lenz 16; Asts: Christink 6		Pts: Gharibloo 22; Rebs: Daghaghelepour 8 Asts: Ahmadi 5

National Indoor Stadium, Beijing
Attendance: 7,262
Referees: Sebastien Gauthier (Canada)

September 11
13:30

Report

Germany	78–72	Sweden
Scoring by quarter: 20-18, 17-21, 17-18, 24-15
Pts: Passiwan 21; Rebs: Köhler-Lenz 11; Asts: Lehmann 7		Pts: Haidari 21; Rebs: Kohlstrom 14; Asts: Haidari 15

National Indoor Stadium, Beijing
Attendance: 7,684
Referees: Antonia Gomez Ruf (Spain)

Group table

Team	Pld	W	L	PF	PA	PD	Pts
Canada	5	5	0	372	276	+96	10
Germany	5	3	2	362	298	+64	8
Iran	5	3	2	359	344	+15	8
Japan	5	2	3	265	319	-54	7
Sweden	5	1	4	309	345	-36	6
South Africa	5	1	4	282	367	-85	6

Quarterfinals

September 13
16:45

Report

Germany	64–71	Great Britain
Scoring by quarter: 17-21, 13-17, 14-20, 20-13
Pts: Köhler-Lenz 18; Rebs: Köhler-Lenz 11; Asts: Christink 5		Pts: Munn 31; Rebs: Munn 20; Asts: Pollock 8

National Indoor Stadium, Beijing
Attendance: 12,000
Referees: Bill Kuerzi (USA)

Classification game

September 15
11:15

Report

Germany	71–57	Japan
Scoring by quarter: 16-16, 21-11, 12-16, 22-14
Pts: Passiwan 30; Rebs: Köhler-Lenz 14; Asts: Lehmann 8		Pts: Fujimoto 20; Rebs: Suzuki 7 Asts: Fujii 3

National Indoor Stadium, Beijing
Attendance: 12,000
Referees: Bill Kuerzi (USA)

5th place game

September 16
13:30

Report

Israel	54–63	Germany
Scoring by quarter: 17-19, 13-14, 12-12, 12-18
Pts: Meishar 19; Rebs: Meishar 14; Asts: Rozenberg 7, Hendel 7		Pts: Passiwan 22; Rebs: Köhler-Lenz 10; Asts: Lehmann 4

National Indoor Stadium, Beijing
Attendance: 11,204
Referees: Jonathon Burford (USA)

Women

- Alke Behrens
- Maren Butterbrodt
- Annette Kahl
- Britta Kautz
- Simone Kues
- Birgit Meitner
- Marina Mohnen
- Edina Müller
- Nora Schratz
- Gesche Schünemann
- Nicole Seifert
- Annika Zeyen

Preliminary round - Group A

September 7
15:30

Report

Germany	62–32	Brazil
Scoring by quarter: 17-6, 17-6, 16-8, 12-12
Pts: Mohnen 23; Rebs: Butterbrodt 10; Asts: Seifert 4		Pts: Moraes 11; Rebs: Reis 11; Asts: Moraes 7

USTB Gymnasium, Beijing
Attendance: 2,443
Referees: Edwin Wallaart (Netherlands)

September 8
16:15

Report

United States	42–38	Germany
Scoring by quarter: 7-17, 16-9, 10-2, 9-10
Pts: Ripp 11; Rebs: Ruddell 6 Asts: Ripp 5		Pts: Mohnen 11; Rebs: Mohnen 14; Asts: Butterbrodt 3, Zeyen 3

National Indoor Stadium, Beijing
Attendance: 8,580
Referees: Rui David Marques (Brazil)

September 10
18:30

Report

Germany	64–56	Australia
Scoring by quarter: 18-8, 12-10, 9-16, 25-22
Pts: Mohnen 22; Rebs: Butterbrodt 12; Asts: Mohnen 6		Pts: Crispin 23; Rebs: Tesch 10; Asts: Tesch 2, Gauci 2

National Indoor Stadium, Beijing
Attendance: 8,201
Referees: Adrianos Pavlopoulos (Greece)

September 11
11:15

Report

Great Britain	44–50	Germany
Scoring by quarter: 8-11, 14-12, 8-15, 14-12
Pts: Strange 12; Rebs: Turner 7, Wager 7 Asts: Strange 3, Wild 3		Pts: Mohnen 16; Rebs: Mohnen 10; Asts: Butterbrodt 3

National Indoor Stadium, Beijing
Attendance: 7,684
Referees: Matias Quintana (Argentina)

Group table

Team	Pld	W	L	PF	PA	PD	Pts
United States	4	4	0	227	149	+78	8
Germany	4	3	1	214	174	+40	7
Australia	4	2	2	223	185	+38	6
Great Britain	4	1	3	166	194	-28	5
Brazil	4	0	4	129	257	-128	4

Quarterfinals

September 12
19:00

Report

Germany	43–28	Netherlands
Scoring by quarter: 4-4, 17-13, 12-11, 10-0
Pts: Kahl 14; Rebs: Kahl 10; Asts: Mohnen 3, Butterbrodt 3		Pts: Huitzing 11; Rebs: Korver 8 Asts: Korver 2

National Indoor Stadium, Beijing
Attendance: 12,215
Referees: Matias Quintana (Argentina)

Semifinals

September 13
21:15

Report

Germany	60–40	Japan
Scoring by quarter: 14-12, 12-10, 8-12, 26-6
Pts: Mohnen 22; Rebs: Mohnen 12, Butterbrodt 12; Asts: Mohnen 3, Butterbrodt 3, Zeyen 3		Pts: Amimoto 17; Rebs: Takubo 7 Asts: Takubo 2, Soeda 2

National Indoor Stadium, Beijing
Attendance: 12,000
Referees: Rui David Marques (Brazil)

Final

September 15
21:30

Report

United States	50–38	Germany
Scoring by quarter: 9-12, 14-4, 16-13, 11-9
Pts: Ripp 16; Rebs: Gonzales 5 Asts: Ripp 4		Pts: Mohnen 13; Rebs: Mohnen 13; Asts: Butterbrodt 3, Mohnen 3 Final Rank:

National Indoor Stadium, Beijing
Attendance: 12,000
Referees: Sebastien Gauthier (Canada)

== Wheelchair Fencing ==
Athlete	Event	Preliminary Pool Stage							1/8 Finals	Quarterfinals	Semifinals	Final/ Bronze medal match
Athlete	Event	Bout 1	Bout 2	Bout 3	Bout 4	Bout 5	Bout 6	Rank	1/8 Finals	Quarterfinals	Semifinals	Final/ Bronze medal match
Athlete	Event	Opposition Result	Opposition Result	Opposition Result	Opposition Result	Opposition Result	Opposition Result	Rank	Opposition Result	Opposition Result	Opposition Result	Opposition Result
Christian Andree	Individual foil A	Horvath (HUN); L 1-5	Betti (ITA); L 2-5	Zhang (CHN); L 0-5	Saengsawang (THA); L 3-5	Alqallaf (KUW); L 1-5	Granell (ESP); L 3-5	7	did not advance			
Christian Andree	Individual épée A	Granell (ESP); L 2-5	Pender (POL); L 2-5	Citerne (FRA); L 1-5	Bazhukov (UKR); L 4-5	Zhang (CHN); L 1-5	N/A	6	did not advance			

== Wheelchair Rugby ==
- Maik Baumann
- Christian Götze
- Jörg Holzem
- Salih Köseoglu
- Wolfgang Mayer
- Nacer Menezla
- Oliver Picht
- Micael Schlüter
- Wolfgang Schmitt
- Christoph Werner
- Dirk Wieschendorf

Preliminary round - Group B

September 12
18:00

Australia	47 – 36	Germany
Batt – 24; Porter – 7 Hucks – 6	Report	Köseoglu – 9 Menezla – 8 Mayer – 7

USTB Gymnasium, Beijing
Referee: Yoshiaki Izumiya (Japan), Darren Roberts (USA)

September 13
20:00

Great Britain	39 – 35	Germany
Collins – 17; Ash – 14; Morrison – 3	Report	Mayer – 11; Picht – 7 Baumann – 7

USTB Gymnasium, Beijing
Referee: Philip Washbourn (New Zealand), Yoshiaki Izumiya (Japan)

September 14
20:00

New Zealand	40 – 31	Germany
Buckingham – 11; Klinkhamer – 10; Johnson – 7	Report	Mayer – 10; Picht – 5 Baumann – 4 Holzem – 4 Menezla – 4

USTB Gymnasium, Beijing
Referee: Pierre-Alexandre Briere (Canada), Ulrica Ulfson (Sweden)

Group table

Team	Pld	W	L	PF	PA	PD	Pts
Australia	3	3	0	129	111	+18	6
Great Britain	3	2	1	115	116	-1	5
New Zealand	3	1	2	116	109	+7	4
Germany	3	0	3	102	126	-24	3

Classification match

September 15
13:00

Japan	38 – 39	Germany
Tamura – 12; Fujishima – 10; Shimakawa – 7	Report	Baumann – 8 Menezla – 8 Picht – 8

USTB Gymnasium, Beijing
Referee: Ulrica Ulfson (Sweden), Christian van de Riet Suter (Netherlands)

5th place match

September 16
15:00

Germany	25 – 28	New Zealand
Mayer – 9 Menezla – 5 Picht – 4 Holzem – 4	Report	Klinkhamer – 7 Tinker – 6 Buckingham – 5

USTB Gymnasium, Beijing
Referee: Gilles Briere (Canada), Yoshiaki Izumiya (Japan)

== Wheelchair Tennis ==
Athlete	Event	First Round	1/8 Finals	Quarterfinals	Semifinals	Finals
Athlete	Event	Opposition Result	Opposition Result	Opposition Result	Opposition Result	Opposition Result
Katharina Krüger	Women's singles	Bartczak (POL); W 7-6(1), 6-7(5), 6-3	Vergeer (NED); L 1-6, 0-6	did not advance		

== See also ==
- Germany at the Paralympics
- Germany at the 2008 Summer Olympics
