= Table tennis at the 2004 Summer Paralympics – Men's individual – Class 6 =

Table Tennis – men's individual 6 at the XII Paralympic Games
- Paralympic Table Tennis
- Venue: Galatsi Olympic Hall
- Dates: 18–21 September 2004
- Competitors: 16 from 12 nations

Medalists
1st place, gold medalist(s)		Daniel Arnold	Germany
2nd place, silver medalist(s)		Rainer Schmidt	Germany
3rd place, bronze medalist(s)		Peter Rosenmeier	Denmark

The men's individual 6 table tennis competition at the 2004 Summer Paralympics was held from 18 to 21 September at the Galatsi Olympic Hall.

Classes 6–10 were for athletes with a physical impairment who competed from a standing position; the lower the number, the greater the impact the impairment had on an athlete’s ability to compete.

The event was won by Daniel Arnold, representing Germany.

== Results ==
=== Preliminaries ===
Qualified for final round

==== Group A ====
Rank	Competitor	MP	W	L	Points	GER	EGY	NED	GRE
1	Daniel Arnold (GER)	3	2	1	7:4	x	1:3	3:0	3:1
2	Farag Faoud Hassan (EGY)	3	2	1	8:6	3:1	x	2:3	3:2
3	Harold Kersten (NED)	3	2	1	6:6	0:3	3:2	x	3:1
4	Polychronis Politsis (GRE)	3	0	3	4:9	1:3	2:3	1:3	x

==== Group B ====
Rank	Competitor	MP	W	L	Points	DEN	RUS	RSA	JPN
1	Peter Rosenmeier (DEN)	3	3	0	9:2	x	3:1	3:0	3:1
2	Vadim Buzin (RUS)	3	2	1	7:3	1:3	x	3:0	3:0
3	Pieter du Plooy (RSA)	3	1	2	3:6	0:3	0:3	x	3:0
4	Hatsuo Ono (JPN)	3	0	3	1:9	1:3	0:3	0:3	x

==== Group C ====
Rank	Competitor	MP	W	L	Points	GER	DEN	SWE	CHI
1	Rainer Schmidt (GER)	3	3	0	9:3	x	3:1	3:2	3:0
2	Michal Jensen (DEN)	3	2	1	7:5	1:3	x	3:2	3:0
3	Simon Itkonen (SWE)	3	1	2	7:6	2:3	2:3	x	3:0
4	Victor Solis (CHI)	3	0	3	0:9	0:3	0:3	0:3	x

==== Group D ====
Rank	Competitor	MP	W	L	Points	POL	NED	GER	FRA
1	Miroslaw Kowalski (POL)	3	2	1	7:3	x	3:0	1:3	3:0
2	Nico Blok (NED)	3	2	1	6:4	0:3	x	3:1	3:0
3	Thomasz Kusiak (GER)	3	1	2	5:7	3:1	1:3	x	1:3
4	Jean Yves Abbadie (FRA)	3	1	2	3:7	0:3	0:3	3:1	x

=== Competition bracket ===
Quarterfinals
Daniel Arnold (GER)	3
Vadim Buzin (RUS)	0
Michal Jensen (DEN)	1
Miroslaw Kowalski (POL)	3
Rainer Schmidt (GER)	3
Farag Faoud Hassan (EGY)	1
Nico Blok (NED)	2
Peter Rosenmeier (DEN)	3

Semifinals
Daniel Arnold (GER)	3
Miroslaw Kowalski (POL)	0
Rainer Schmidt (GER)	3
Peter Rosenmeier (DEN)	0

Finals
Daniel Arnold (GER)	3
Rainer Schmidt (GER)	0
Third place
Miroslaw Kowalski (POL)	0
Peter Rosenmeier (DEN)	3
