= Ye Chaoqun =

Chinese para table tennis player

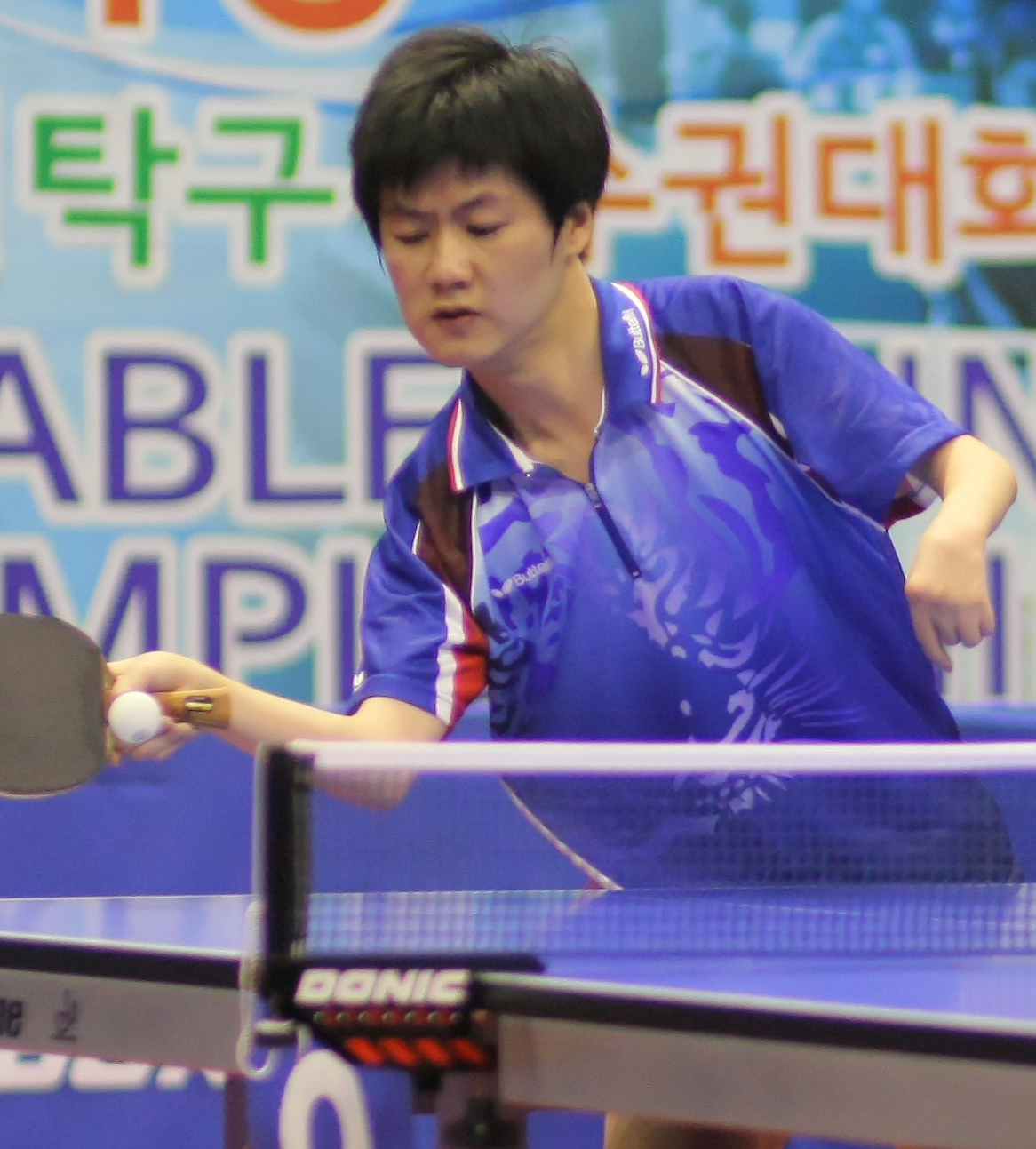
- Ye at the 2010 World Para Table Tennis Championships

Personal information
- Born: October 7, 1984 (age 41) Xiamen, Fujian, China
- Height: 171 cm (5 ft 7 in)
- Weight: 61 kg (134 lb)

Sport
- Sport: Table tennis
- Playing style: Right-handed shakehand grip
- Disability class: 8 (formerly 7)
- Highest ranking: 1 (January 2012)
- Current ranking: 8 (February 2020)
Medal record
Men's para table tennis
Representing China
Paralympic Games
Gold medal – first place	2008 Beijing	Teams C6–8
Gold medal – first place	2020 Tokyo	Teams C8
Silver medal – second place	2008 Beijing	Singles C7
World Championships
Gold medal – first place	2010 Gwangju	Singles C7
Gold medal – first place	2014 Beijing	Teams C8
Silver medal – second place	2006 Montreux	Singles C7
Silver medal – second place	2014 Beijing	Singles C8
Bronze medal – third place	2006 Montreux	Teams C7
Bronze medal – third place	2010 Gwangju	Teams C6–7
Asian Para Games
Gold medal – first place	2010 Guangzhou	Teams C6–8
Gold medal – first place	2014 Incheon	Teams C8
Gold medal – first place	2018 Jakarta	Teams C8
Silver medal – second place	2010 Guangzhou	Singles C8
Silver medal – second place	2014 Incheon	Singles C8
Silver medal – second place	2018 Jakarta	Singles C8
FESPIC Games
Gold medal – first place	2006 Kuala Lumpur	Singles C7
Gold medal – first place	2006 Kuala Lumpur	Teams C10
Silver medal – second place	2002 Busan	Teams C8
Asian Championships
Gold medal – first place	2005 Kuala Lumpur	Singles C7
Gold medal – first place	2005 Kuala Lumpur	Teams C6–7
Gold medal – first place	2007 Seoul	Singles C7
Gold medal – first place	2007 Seoul	Teams C6–7
Gold medal – first place	2009 Amman	Singles C7
Gold medal – first place	2009 Amman	Teams C6–7
Gold medal – first place	2011 Hong Kong	Singles C8
Gold medal – first place	2011 Hong Kong	Teams C8
Gold medal – first place	2013 Beijing	Teams C8
Gold medal – first place	2015 Amman	Singles C8
Gold medal – first place	2015 Amman	Teams C8
Gold medal – first place	2017 Beijing	Teams C8
Gold medal – first place	2019 Taichung	Teams C8
Silver medal – second place	2009 Amman	Open singles standing
Silver medal – second place	2013 Beijing	Singles C8
Silver medal – second place	2017 Beijing	Singles C8
Bronze medal – third place	2019 Taichung	Singles C8
FESPIC Championships
Gold medal – first place	2003 Shanghai	Teams C6–7
Silver medal – second place	2003 Shanghai	Singles C7

Ye Chaoqun
- Traditional Chinese: 葉超群
- Simplified Chinese: 叶超群
Transcriptions
Standard Mandarin
- Hanyu Pinyin: Yè Chāoqún

Ye Chaoqun (Chinese: 叶超群, born 7 October 1984) is a Chinese para table tennis player. He won a gold and a silver at the 2008 Summer Paralympics.

Ye has congenital muscular dystrophy and hand/arm abnormalities.
