= Zeev Glikman =

Israeli para table tennis player

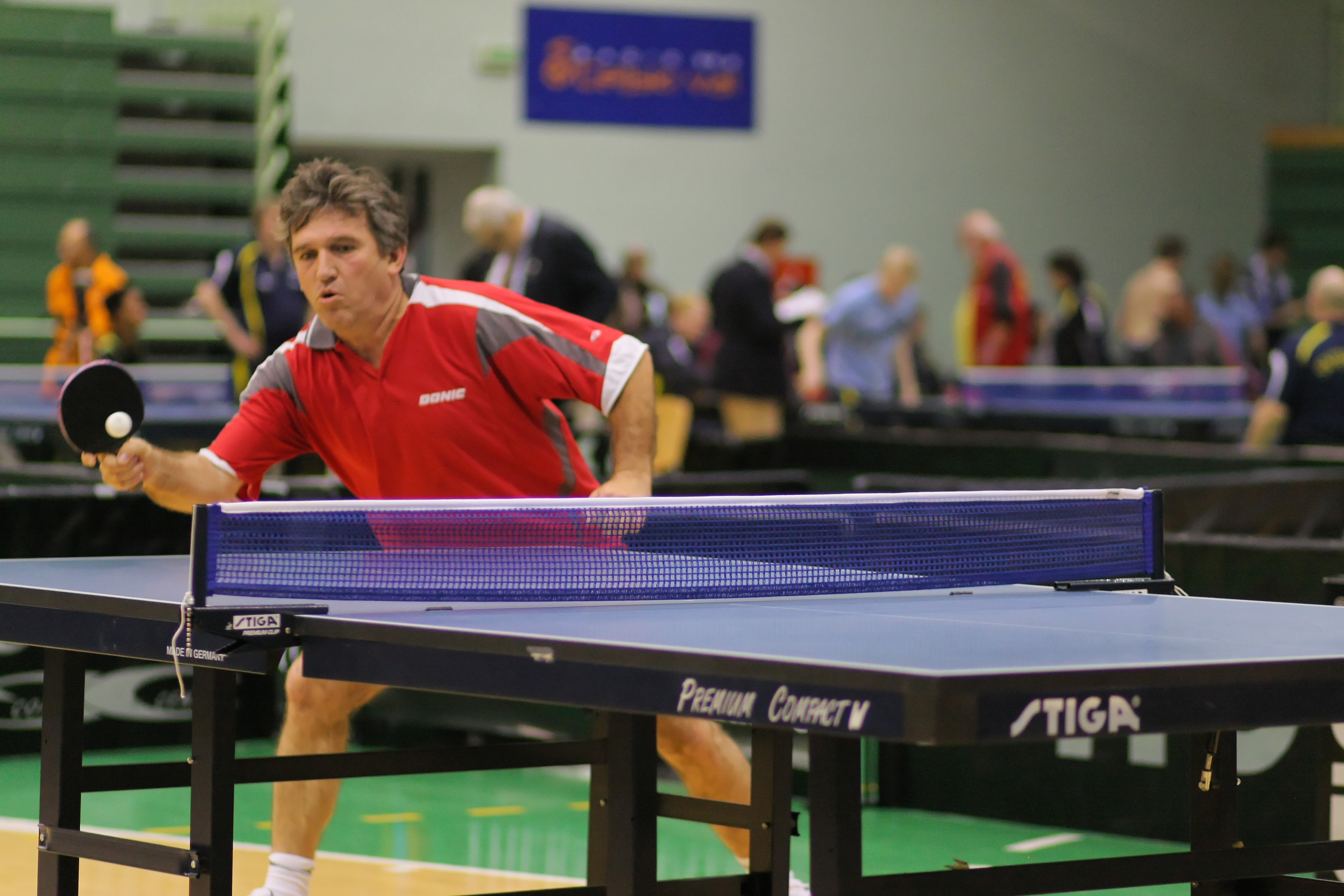

Personal information
- Native name: זאב גליקמן
- Born: 4 August 1958 (age 68)

Sport
- Country: Israel
- Sport: Para table tennis
Medal record
Event	1st	2nd	3rd
Paralympic Games	1	1	0
World Championships	1	0	0
Representing Israel
Paralympic Games
Table tennis
Gold medal – first place	1992 Barcelona	Singles 7
Silver medal – second place	2000 Sydney	Singles 7
World Para Table Tennis Championships
Gold medal – first place	2002 Taipei	Singles 7

Zeev Glikman (Hebrew: זאב גליקמן; born 4 August 1958) is an Israeli para table tennis player. He competed in five Summer Games (1992, 1996, 2000, 2004 and 2008).
