= Stéphane Messi =

French para table tennis player

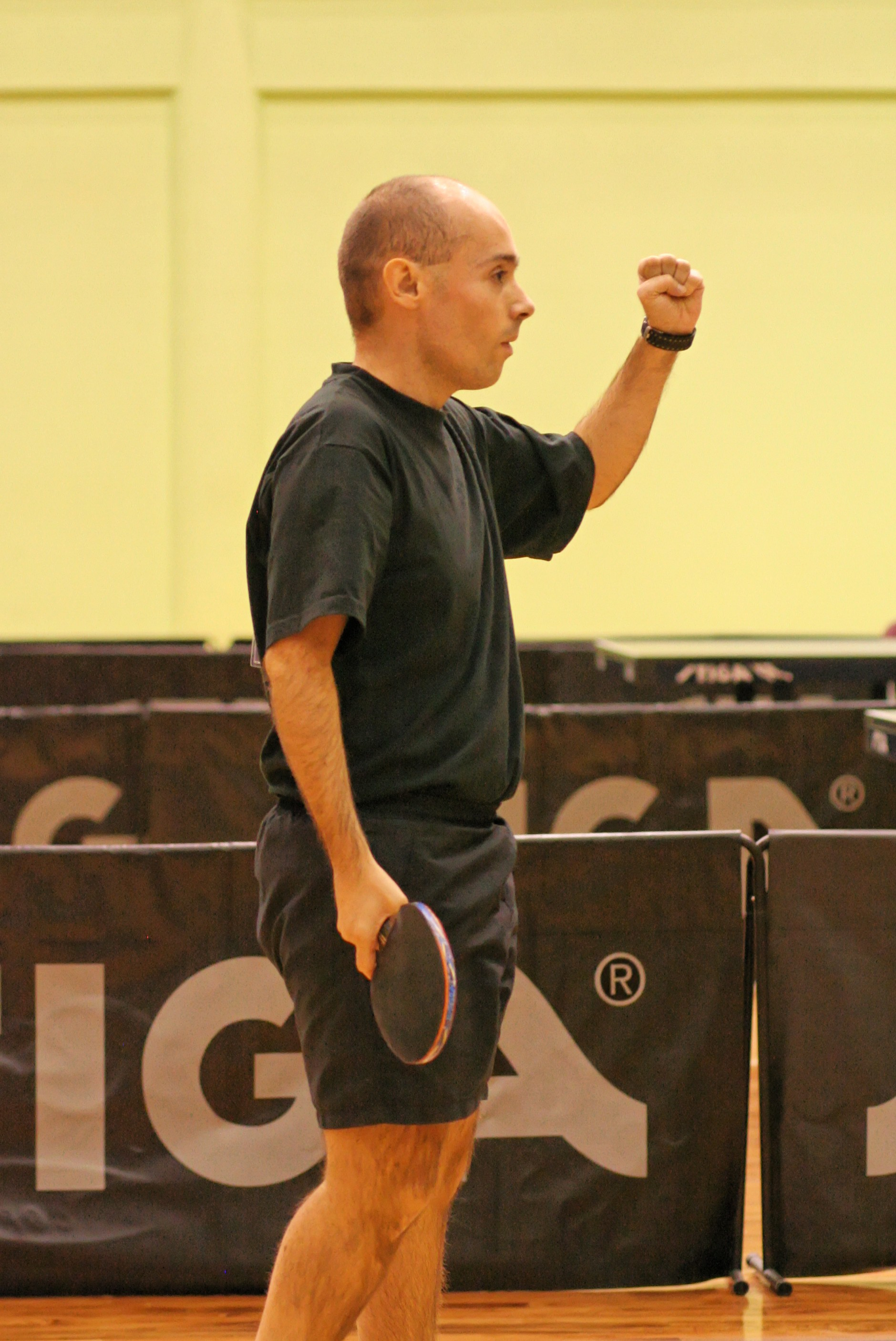
- Messi at 2007 European Table Tennis Championships

Personal information
- Born: 27 November 1972 (age 53) Agen, France
- Home town: Hyères, France

Sport
- Country: France
- Sport: Para table tennis
- Disability: Myopathy
- Disability class: C7
Medal record
Para table tennis
Representing France
Paralympic Games
Gold medal – first place	2004 Athens	Men's singles C7
Silver medal – second place	2000 Sydney	Men's teams C6-7
Bronze medal – third place	2000 Sydney	Men's singles C7
Bronze medal – third place	2008 Beijing	Men's teams C6-8
World Championships
Silver medal – second place	1998 Paris	Men's teams C6-7
Silver medal – second place	2002 Taipei	Men's singles C7
Bronze medal – third place	2002 Taipei	Men's teams C9
Bronze medal – third place	2006 Montreux	Men's singles C7
World Team Championships
Bronze medal – third place	2017 Bratislava	Men's teams C7
European Championships
Gold medal – first place	1995 Hillerød	Men's singles C6
Silver medal – second place	2001 Frankfurt	Men's singles C7
Silver medal – second place	2005 Jesolo	Men's singles C7
Silver medal – second place	2009 Genoa	Men's teams C7
Silver medal – second place	2017 Laško	Men's teams C7
Bronze medal – third place	1995 Hillerød	Men's teams C8
Bronze medal – third place	2003 Zagreb	Men's teams C7
Bronze medal – third place	2007 Kranjska Gora	Men's teams C7

Stéphane Messi (born 27 November 1972) is a French para table tennis player who competes in international level events. He is a Paralympic champion, a five-time World medalist and a European champion. He has won medals in team events alongside Michel Schaller, François Sérignat and Alain Pichon.
