= Andrea Furlan =

Brazilian-Canadian physician

- Occupations: Physician, scientist, professor

Academic background
- Education: MD, University of São Paulo; PhD in Clinical Epidemiology, University of Toronto
- Website: www.doctorandreafurlan.com

Andrea Furlan is a Brazilian-Canadian physician, scientist, and professor known for her contributions to rehabilitation medicine and chronic pain management. She serves as a Senior Scientist at the KITE Research Institute, the research arm of the Toronto Rehabilitation Institute at the University Health Network, and holds a professorship in the Division of Psychiatry at the University of Toronto.

== Early life and education ==
Furlan completed her residency in physiatry at the University of São Paulo in Brazil. She later pursued a PhD in clinical epidemiology at the University of Toronto, focusing her thesis on the improving techniques for the use of non-randomized studies of lower-back pain treatments. Following completion of her PhD, she undertook a clinical fellowship in psychiatry at the Toronto Rehabilitation Institute.

== Career ==
Furlan serves as a Senior Scientist at the KITE Research Institute, the research arm of the Toronto Rehabilitation Institute at University Health Network (UHN). She is also a professor in the Department of Medicine's Division of Physiatry at the University of Toronto. In her role at KITE, Furlan focuses on rehabilitation medicine, chronic pain, low-back pain, and neuropathic pain, employing methodologies such as systematic reviews and meta-analyses in her research.

Furlan has authored over 130 publications in peer-reviewed journals and contributed to seven book chapters. She speaks at conferences and provides expert commentary to the media.

She chairs ECHO (Extension for Community Health-care Outcomes) Ontario Chronic Pain and Opioid Stewardship at UHN and co-chairs ECHO Occupational and Environmental Medicine and ECHO for Return to Work of Public Safety Personnel at the Institute for Work & Health.

During the COVID-19 pandemic, Furlan launched a YouTube channel to disseminate knowledge about chronic pain management.

== Awards and recognition ==
In 2020, Furlan received the Pain Excellence Award from the Pain Society of Alberta. The following year, she was honoured with the Canadian Pain Society's Excellence in Pain Mentorship Award.
