= François Sérignat =

French para table tennis player

Personal information
- Born: 12 March 1961 (age 65)
- Home town: Sablé-sur-Sarthe, France

Sport
- Country: France
- Sport: Para table tennis
- Disability class: C8
Medal record
Para table tennis
Representing France
Paralympic Games
Gold medal – first place	2000 Sydney	Men's team C10
Silver medal – second place	2004 Athens	Men's team C10
Bronze medal – third place	2008 Beijing	Men's team C6-8
World Championships
Bronze medal – third place	1998 Paris	Men's team C10
Bronze medal – third place	2002 Taipei	Men's team C9
European Championships
Gold medal – first place	1997 Stockholm	Men's team C9
Gold medal – first place	1999 Piešťany	Men's team C10
Gold medal – first place	2001 Frankfurt	Men's team C9
Bronze medal – third place	1997 Stockholm	Men's singles C9
Bronze medal – third place	1999 Piešťany	Men's doubles C6-10
Bronze medal – third place	2003 Zagreb	Men's team C9
Bronze medal – third place	2007 Kranjska Gora	Men's team C6-8

François Sérignat (born 12 March 1961) is a French retired para table tennis player who competed at international level events. He has participated at three Paralympic Games, he is a triple European champion and a double World bronze medalist. He has played alongside Gilles de la Bourdonnaye and Olivier Chateigner.
