= Daniel Arnold (table tennis) =

German para table tennis player

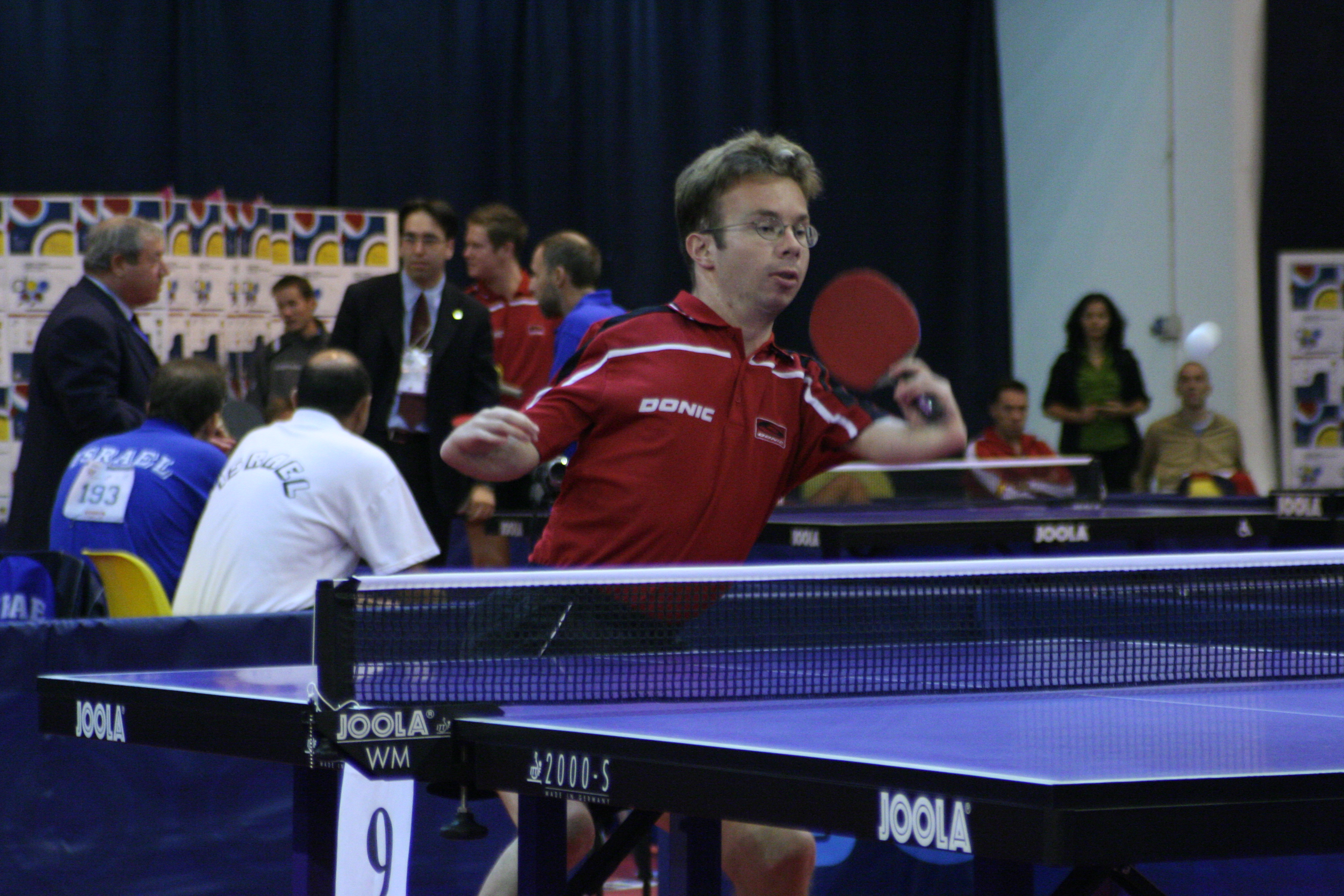

Personal information
- Born: 16 December 1978 (age 47) Augsburg, Germany
- Height: 1.68 m (5 ft 6 in)

Sport
- Country: Germany
- Sport: Para table tennis
- Disability: Dysmelia
- Disability class: C6
Medal record
Para table tennis
Representing Germany
Paralympic Games
Gold medal – first place	2000 Sydney	Men's teams C6-7
Gold medal – first place	2004 Athens	Men's singles C6
Gold medal – first place	2004 Athens	Men's teams C6-7
Silver medal – second place	2000 Sydney	Men's singles C6
Silver medal – second place	2008 Beijing	Men's singles C6
World Championships
Gold medal – first place	1998 Paris	Men's singles C6
Gold medal – first place	1998 Paris	Men's teams C6-7
Gold medal – first place	2002 Taipei	Men's teams C6-7
Gold medal – first place	2006 Montreux	Men's singles C6
Gold medal – first place	2006 Montreux	Men's teams C6
Bronze medal – third place	2002 Taipei	Men's singles C6
European Championships
Gold medal – first place	1997 Stockholm	Men's teams C6
Gold medal – first place	1999 Piešťany	Men's singles C6
Gold medal – first place	1999 Piešťany	Men's teams C6
Gold medal – first place	2001 Frankfurt	Men's teams C6
Gold medal – first place	2003 Zagreb	Men's teams C6
Gold medal – first place	2005 Jesolo	Men's singles C6
Gold medal – first place	2007 Kranjska Gora	Men's singles C6
Gold medal – first place	2007 Kranjska Gora	Men's teams C6
Silver medal – second place	2003 Zagreb	Men's singles C6
Silver medal – second place	2005 Jesolo	Men's teams C6
Bronze medal – third place	1997 Stockholm	Men's singles C6

Daniel Arnold (born 16 December 1978) is a German retired para table tennis player who competed in international level events. He is a six-time Paralympic champion, five-time World champion and eight-time European champion. He was born with deformed arms and a shortened right leg due to dysmelia.
