= Simon Itkonen =

Swedish para table tennis player

Personal information
- Born: 18 October 1972 (age 53) Bromölla, Sweden

Sport
- Sport: Para table tennis
Medal record
Representing Sweden
Paralympic Games
Bronze medal – third place	2004 Athens	Teams C6-7
World Championships
Bronze medal – third place	2002 Taipei	Teams C6-7
Bronze medal – third place	2006 Montreux	Singles C6
European Championships
Silver medal – second place	1999 Piešťany	Teams C6
Bronze medal – third place	2001 Frankfurt	Teams C6
Bronze medal – third place	2005 Jesolo	Teams C6

Simon Itkonen (born 18 October 1972) is a Swedish retired para table tennis player who competed at international table tennis competitions. He is a Paralympic and World bronze medalist and European silver medalist.
