= Nico Blok =

Dutch para table tennis player

Personal information
- Born: 13 July 1981 (age 44) Gouda, Netherlands
- Height: 1.77 m (5 ft 10 in)
- Weight: 40 kg (88 lb)

Sport
- Country: Netherlands
- Sport: Para table tennis
- Disability: Muscular disease
- Disability class: C6
Medal record
Para table tennis
Representing Netherlands
Paralympic Games
Bronze medal – third place	2008 Beijing	Men's singles C6
World Championships
Silver medal – second place	2002 Taipei	Men's singles C6
Silver medal – second place	2002 Taipei	Men's teams C6-7
Bronze medal – third place	2006 Montreux	Men's teams C6
European Championships
Silver medal – second place	2001 Frankfurt	Men's teams C6
Silver medal – second place	2003 Zagreb	Men's teams C6

Nico Blok (born 13 July 1981) is a retired Dutch para table tennis player who competed in international level events. He is a Paralympic bronze medalist, three-time World medalist and a double European silver medalist.

== Personal life ==
When Blok was born in a hospital in Gouda, South Holland, doctors suspected that there was something wrong with him after he was born, it was later revealed that he was born with an unknown muscular disease. Due to this unknown muscular disease, he was prominently thin as he only weighed 40 kg at a height of 1.77m and has also had limited muscle strength and walking long distances were impossible for him.

Blok was very fascinated in sports at a young age: his older brother played soccer and tennis but it was too hard for Nico. His parents tried to find an alternative sport for him to participate in and when he was nine years old, he tried out table tennis and this was how he got his motivation.
