= Rainer Schmidt (table tennis) =

German para table tennis player

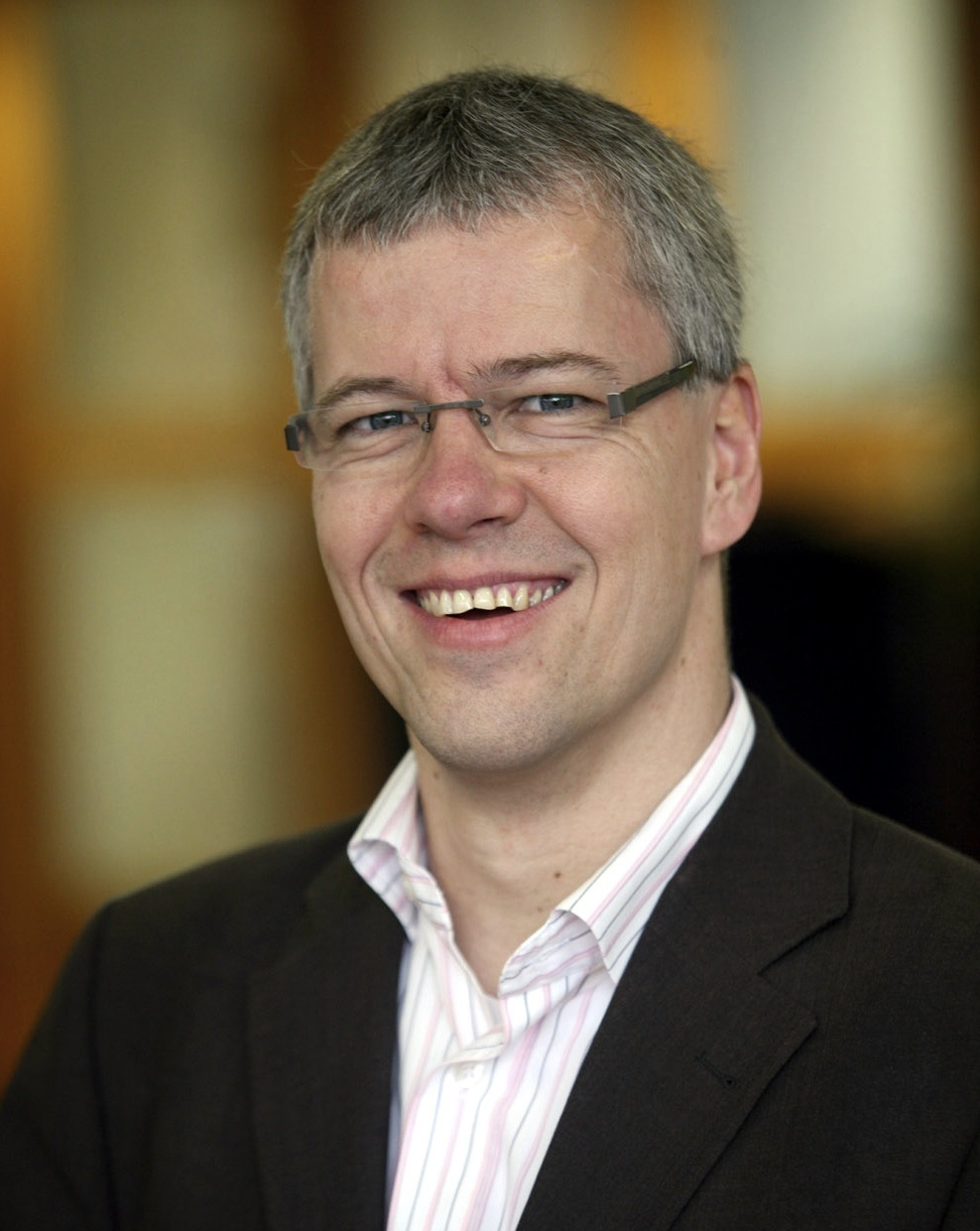
- Rainer Schmidt

Personal information
- Born: 18 February 1965 (age 61) Nümbrecht, West Germany
- Home town: Bonn, Germany

Sport
- Country: Germany
- Sport: Para table tennis
- Disability: Femur fibula ulna syndrome
- Disability class: C6
- Retired: 2008
Medal record
Para table tennis
Representing Germany
Paralympic Games
Gold medal – first place	1992 Barcelona	Men's singles C6
Gold medal – first place	2000 Sydney	Men's teams C6-7
Gold medal – first place	2004 Athens	Men's teams C6-7
Silver medal – second place	1992 Barcelona	Men's teams C6
Silver medal – second place	2004 Athens	Men's singles C6
World Championships
Gold medal – first place	1990 Assen	Men's singles C6
Gold medal – first place	1990 Assen	Men's teams C6-7
Gold medal – first place	1998 Paris	Men's teams C6-7
Gold medal – first place	2002 Taipei	Men's teams C6-7
Gold medal – first place	2006 Montreux	Men's teams C6
Silver medal – second place	2006 Montreux	Men's singles C6
European Championships
Gold medal – first place	1991 Salou	Men's teams C6
Gold medal – first place	1995 Hillerød	Men's teams C6-7
Gold medal – first place	1997 Stockholm	Men's singles C6
Gold medal – first place	1997 Stockholm	Men's teams C6
Gold medal – first place	1999 Piešťany	Men's teams C6
Gold medal – first place	2001 Frankfurt	Men's teams C6
Gold medal – first place	2003 Zagreb	Men's singles C6
Gold medal – first place	2003 Zagreb	Men's teams C6
Gold medal – first place	2007 Kranjska Gora	Men's teams C6
Silver medal – second place	1991 Salou	Men's singles C6
Silver medal – second place	1995 Hillerød	Men's singles C6
Silver medal – second place	2001 Frankfurt	Men's singles C6
Silver medal – second place	2005 Jesolo	Men's teams C6
Bronze medal – third place	2005 Jesolo	Men's singles C6

Rainer Schmidt (born 18 February 1965) is a German retired para table tennis player who played in international level events. He participated in four Summer Paralympic Games and has won three Paralympic titles. He has also won five World titles and nine European titles in mostly team events with Jochen Wollmert.

During his sporting career, he was a left handed player with a metal bar attached onto his left upper arm and has a prosthetic on his right leg.
