= Jordi Morales =

Spanish para table tennis player

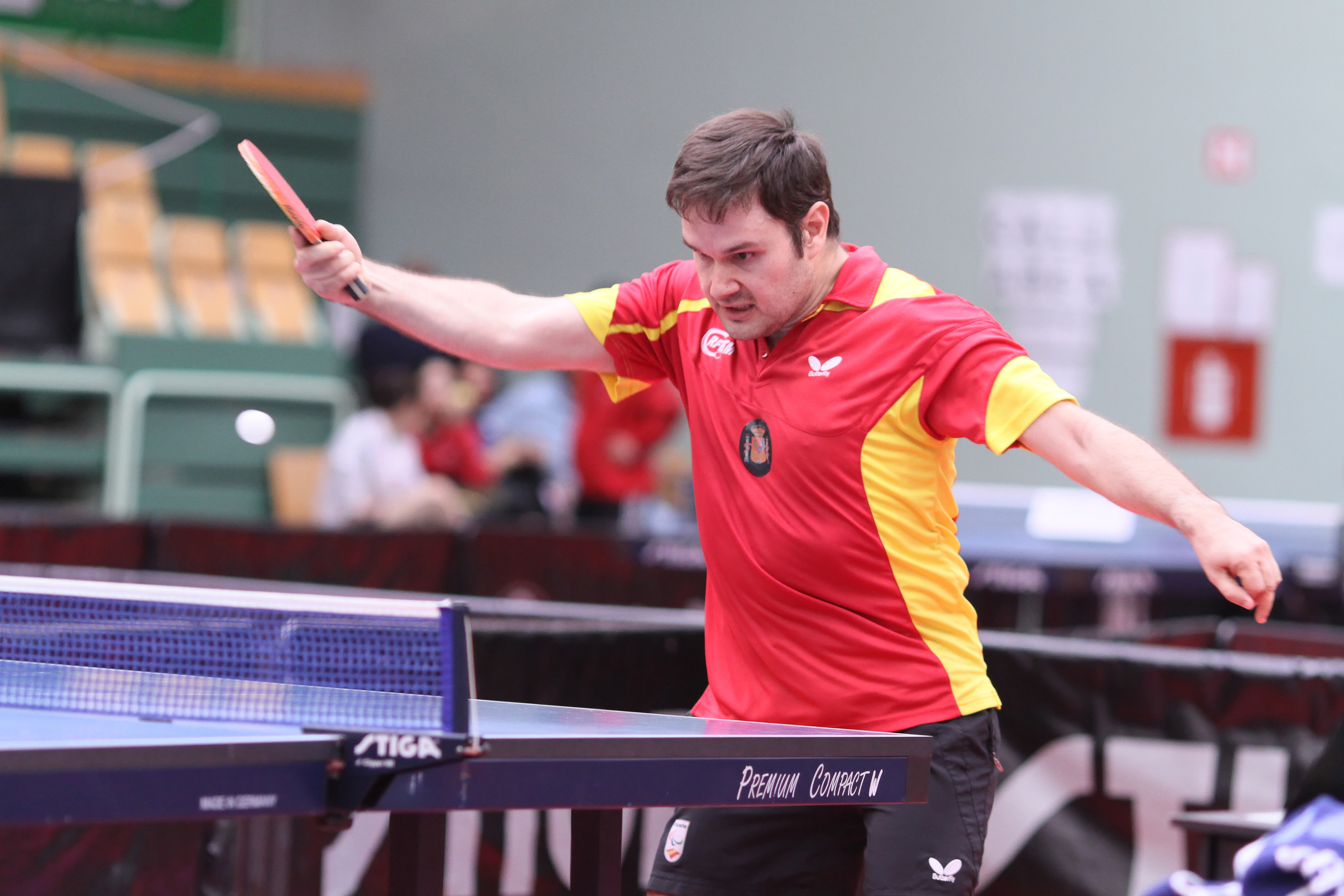

Personal information
- Full name: Jordi Morales García
- Nationality: Spanish
- Born: 17 November 1985 (age 40) Esparreguera, Spain

Sport
- Country: Spain
- Sport: Table tennis
Medal record
Table tennis
Representing Spain
Paralympic Games
Silver medal – second place	2012 London	Team Class 6-8
Bronze medal – third place	2004 Athens	Class 7 singles
Bronze medal – third place	2020 Tokyo	Team class 6–7

Jordi Morales García (Note: In this Catalan name, the first or paternal surname is Morales and the second or maternal family name is Garcia; both are generally joined by the conjunction "i".) (born 17 November 1985) is a class 7 para table tennis player from Spain.

== Personal ==
In 2013, he was awarded the silver Real Orden al Mérito Deportivo.

== Table tennis ==
He played table tennis at the 2000, 2004, 2008 and 2012 Summer Paralympics. In 2004, he finished third in the class 7 singles table tennis event. In 2012, he finished second in the team class 6–8 event.
