= Peter Rosenmeier =

Danish para table tennis player

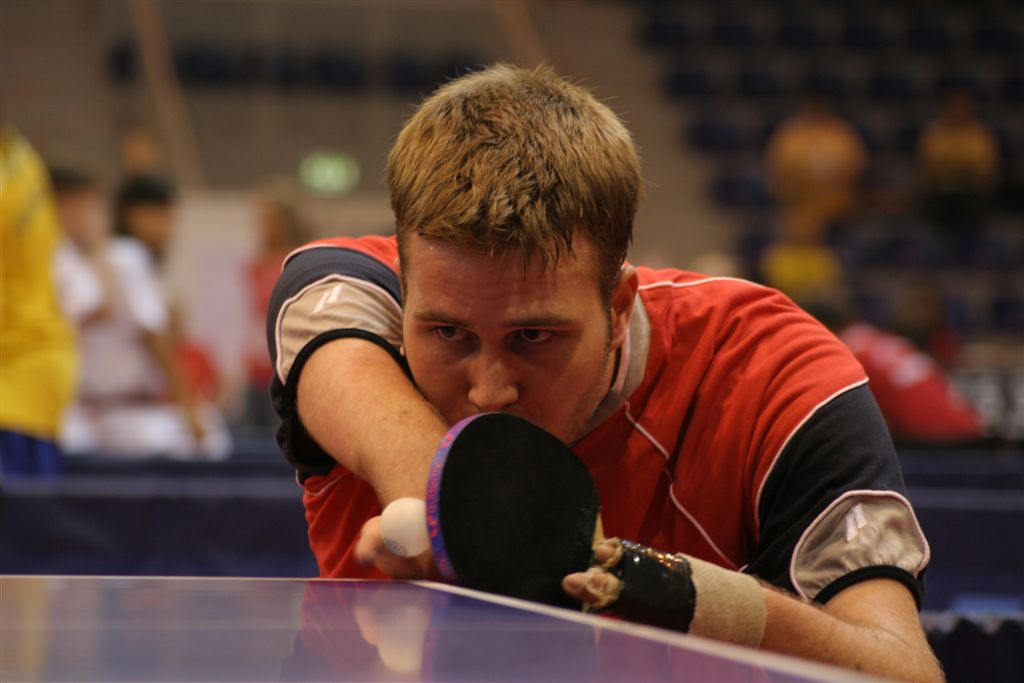
- Rosenmeier at the 2005 European Championships

Personal information
- Nationality: Danish
- Born: 23 March 1984 (age 42) Hadsund, Denmark
- Home town: Malmö, Sweden
- Height: 167 cm (5 ft 6 in)

Sport
- Country: Denmark
- Sport: Para table tennis
- Disability class: C6
- Club: Taastrup BTK, Malmö
- Coached by: Christoffer Petersen
Medal record
Para table tennis
Representing Denmark
Paralympic Games
Gold medal – first place	2008 Beijing	Men's singles C6
Gold medal – first place	2016 Rio de Janeiro	Men's singles C6
Silver medal – second place	2020 Tokyo	Men's singles C6
Bronze medal – third place	2004 Athens	Men's singles C6
Bronze medal – third place	2012 London	Men's singles C6
Bronze medal – third place	2024 Paris	Men's singles C6
World Championships
Gold medal – first place	2010 Gwangju	Men's singles C6
Gold medal – first place	2018 Lasko	Men's singles C6
Silver medal – second place	2006 Montreux	Men's teams C6
Silver medal – second place	2014 Beijing	Men's singles C6
World Team Championships
Bronze medal – third place	2017 Bratislava	Men's teams C6
European Championships
Gold medal – first place	2005 Gesolo	Men's teams C6
Gold medal – first place	2013 Lignano	Men's singles C6
Gold medal – first place	2013 Lignano	Men's teams C6
Gold medal – first place	2015 Vejle	Men's teams C6
Silver medal – second place	2011 Split	Men's teams C6
Silver medal – second place	2015 Vejle	Men's singles C6
Bronze medal – third place	2003 Zagreb	Men's teams C6
Bronze medal – third place	2007 Kranjska Gora	Men's singles C6
Bronze medal – third place	2007 Kranjska Gora	Men's teams C6

Peter Rosenmeier (born 23 March 1984) is a Danish male para table tennis player, previous World Champion and current Paralympic Champion of his class (M6).

Rosenmeier has participated at all Summer Paralympics since the 2004 Summer Paralympics in Athens, where he won a bronze medal. At the 2008 Summer Paralympics in Beijing he won a gold medal, at the 2012 Summer Paralympics in London a bronze medal, and at the 2016 Summer Paralympics in Rio de Janeiro a gold medal.
