= Adam Jurasz =

Polish table tennis Paralympian

Personal information
- Born: 15 December 1967 (age 58) Żywiec, Poland

Sport
- Country: Poland
- Sport: Para table tennis
- Disability: Club foot
- Retired: 2008
Medal record
Para table tennis
Representing Poland
Paralympic Games
Silver medal – second place	2004 Athens	Men's teams C6-7
European Championships
Silver medal – second place	2003 Zagreb	Teams C6-7

Adam Jurasz (born 15 December 1967) is a Polish retired para table tennis player who competed in international table tennis competitions. He is a Paralympic silver medalist and European silver medalist in team events, he won his medals alongside Miroslaw Kowalski.
