= Table tennis at the 2020 Summer Paralympics – Men's individual – Class 3 =

Table tennis at the XVI Paralympic Games
- Venue: Tokyo Metropolitan Gymnasium
- Dates: 25–29 August
- Competitors: 21 from 17 nations

Medalists
1st place, gold medalist(s)		Feng Panfeng	China
2nd place, silver medalist(s)		Thomas Schmidberger	Germany
3rd place, bronze medalist(s)		Jenson Van Emburgh	United States
3rd place, bronze medalist(s)		Zhai Xiang	China

The Men's individual table tennis – Class 3 tournament at the 2020 Summer Paralympics in Tokyo is taking place between 25 and 29 August 2021 at Tokyo Metropolitan Gymnasium. Classes 1–5 are for athletes with a physical impairment that affected their legs, and who compete in a sitting position. The lower the number, the greater the impact the impairment is on an athlete's ability to compete.

In the preliminary stage, athletes competed in seven groups of three. Winners and runners-up of each group qualified for the knock-out stage, with the best two group winners receiving a bye to the quarter-finals and the other 12 teams playing from the round of 16. In this edition of the Games, no bronze medal match will be held. Losers of each semifinal will automatically be awarded a bronze medal.

== Results ==
All times are local time in UTC+9.

=== Preliminary round ===
The first two matches were played on 25 August, and the third on 26 August.

Qualified for the knock-out stage

==== Group A ====
Seed	Athlete	Matches won	Matches lost	Games won	Games lost	Points diff	Rank
1	Feng Panfeng (CHN)	2	0	6	0	+36	1
14	Maciej Nalepka (POL)	1	1	3	4	–12	2
16	Matteo Orsi (ITA)	0	2	1	6	–24	3

Matteo Orsi (ITA)	6	6	5
Feng Panfeng (CHN)	11	11	11

Maciej Nalepka (POL)	3	5	5
Feng Panfeng (CHN)	11	11	11

Maciej Nalepka (POL)	6	11	13	11
Matteo Orsi (ITA)	11	8	11	3

==== Group B ====
Seed	Athlete	Matches won	Matches lost	Games won	Games lost	Points diff	Rank
2	Thomas Schmidberger (GER)	2	0	6	0	+31	1
15	Vladimir Toporkov (RPC)	1	1	3	5	–10	2
13	Baek Young-bok (KOR)	0	2	2	6	–21	3

Vladimir Toporkov (RPC)	7	2	6
Thomas Schmidberger (GER)	11	11	11

Baek Young-bok (KOR)	6	5	11
Thomas Schmidberger (GER)	11	11	13

Baek Young-bok (KOR)	11	5	11	8	6
Vladimir Toporkov (RPC)	8	11	8	11	11

==== Group C ====
Seed	Athlete	Matches won	Matches lost	Games won	Games lost	Points diff	Rank
3	Florian Merrien (FRA)	2	0	6	2	+23	1
12	Gabriel Copola (ARG)	1	1	5	5	–16	2
17	Anurak Laowong (THA)	0	2	2	6	–7	3

Anurak Laowong (THA)	8	7	8
Florian Merrien (FRA)	11	11	11

Gabriel Copola (ARG)	9	12	3	13	4
Florian Merrien (FRA)	11	10	11	11	11

Gabriel Copola (ARG)	8	11	5	11	20
Anurak Laowong (THA)	11	9	11	9	18

==== Group D ====
Seed	Athlete	Matches won	Matches lost	Games won	Games lost	Points diff	Rank
4	Thomas Brüchle (GER)	2	0	6	0	+26	1
21	Ahmed Koleosho (NGR)	1	1	3	4	–15	2
10	Vasyl Petruniv (UKR)	0	2	1	6	–11	3

Ahmed Koleosho (NGR)	5	3	8
Thomas Brüchle (GER)	11	11	11

Vasyl Petruniv (UKR)	10	6	9
Thomas Brüchle (GER)	12	11	11

Vasyl Petruniv (UKR)	11	11	7	9
Ahmed Koleosho (NGR)	5	13	11	11

==== Group E ====
Seed	Athlete	Matches won	Matches lost	Games won	Games lost	Points diff	Rank
8	Yuttajak Glinbancheun (THA)	2	0	6	0	+10	1
20	David Andrade de Freitas (BRA)	1	1	3	3	–10	2
5	Alexander Öhgren (SWE) (w/o)	0	2	0	6	0	3

Alexander Öhgren (SWE)
David Andrade de Freitas (BRA) (w/o)

Yuttajak Glinbancheun (THA) (w/o)
Alexander Öhgren (SWE)

Yuttajak Glinbancheun (THA)	11	14	13
David Andrade de Freitas (BRA)	5	12	11

Alexander Öhgren developed symptoms of having a cold. While he did text negative for COVID-19 he was nevertheless forced to withdraw from the competition.

==== Group F ====
Seed	Athlete	Matches won	Matches lost	Games won	Games lost	Points diff	Rank
6	Zhai Xiang (CHN)	2	0	6	0	+39	1
11	Jenson Van Emburgh (USA)	1	1	3	3	+4	2
19	Petr Svatoš (CZE)	0	2	0	6	–43	3

Petr Svatoš (CZE)	2	3	7
Zhai Xiang (CHN)	11	11	11

Jenson Van Emburgh (USA)	5	3	7
Zhai Xiang (CHN)	11	11	11

Jenson Van Emburgh (USA)	11	11	11
Petr Svatoš (CZE)	6	3	2

==== Group G ====
Seed	Athlete	Matches won	Matches lost	Games won	Games lost	Points diff	Rank
7	Zhao Ping (CHN)	2	0	6	1	+9	1
18	Colin Judge (IRL)	1	1	4	3	–9	2
9	Welder Knaf (BRA) (w/o)	0	2	0	6	0	3

Colin Judge (IRL)	7	9	12	6
Zhao Ping (CHN)	11	11	10	11

Welder Knaf (BRA)
Zhao Ping (CHN) (w/o)

Welder Knaf (BRA)
Colin Judge (IRL) (w/o)

=== Knockout stage ===
Round of 16
Gabriel Copola (ARG)	8	7	12
Yuttajak Glinbancheun (THA)	11	11	14
Colin Judge (IRL)	5	7	11	9
Vladimir Toporkov (RPC)	11	11	3	11
Jenson Van Emburgh (USA)	11	6	11	9	11
Thomas Brüchle (GER)	7	11	4	11	7
Florian Merrien (FRA)	11	11	11
David Andrade de Freitas (BRA)	6	8	1
Maciej Nalepka (POL)	4	3	11	6
Zhai Xiang (CHN)	11	11	9	11
Zhao Ping (CHN)	11	11	12	11
Ahmed Koleosho (NGR)	13	9	10	8

Quarter-finals
Feng Panfeng (CHN)	11	11	11
Yuttajak Glinbancheun (THA)	3	3	7
Vladimir Toporkov (RPC)	5	7	6
Jenson Van Emburgh (USA)	11	11	11
Florian Merrien (FRA)	13	11	4	3	8
Zhai Xiang (CHN)	11	5	11	11	11
Zhao Ping (CHN)	5	3	8
Thomas Schmidberger (GER)	11	11	11

Semi-finals
Feng Panfeng (CHN)	11	11	11
Jenson Van Emburgh (USA) (bronze)	6	8	6
Zhai Xiang (CHN) (bronze)	9	11	6
Thomas Schmidberger (GER)	11	13	11

Gold medal match
Feng Panfeng (CHN) (gold)	11	11	8	4	11
Thomas Schmidberger (GER) (silver)	9	4	11	11	9
