= Table tennis at the 2016 Summer Paralympics – Men's individual – Class 3 =

Table tennis at the XV Paralympic Games
- Venue: Riocentro Pavilion 3
- Dates: 8–11 September 2016
- Competitors: 24 from 16 nations

Medalists
1st place, gold medalist(s)		Feng Panfeng	China
2nd place, silver medalist(s)		Thomas Schmidberger	Germany
3rd place, bronze medalist(s)		Florian Merrien	France

The men's individual table tennis – Class 3 tournament at the 2016 Summer Paralympics in Rio de Janeiro took place during 8–11 September 2016 at Riocentro Pavilion 3. Classes 1–5 were for athletes with a physical impairment that affected their legs, and who competed in a sitting position. The lower the number, the greater the impact the impairment was on an athlete's ability to compete.

In the preliminary stage, athletes competed in eight groups of three. Winners and runners-up of each group qualified to the quarterfinals.

== Results ==
All times are local time in UTC-3.

=== Finals ===
==== Main bracket ====
Round of 16
A1	Thomas Schmidberger (GER)	11	11	11
C2	Asama Abu Jame (JOR)	4	4	9
H2	Welder Knaf (BRA)	8	11	11	11
G1	Gabriel Copola (ARG)	11	3	5	3
F1	Zhao Ping (CHN)	11	11	6	11
B2	Yuttajak Glinbancheun (THA)	6	7	11	8
E2	Vasyl Petruniv (UKR)	13	11	3	12	9
D1	Florian Merrien (FRA)	15	8	11	10	11
C1	Thomas Bruchle (GER)	11	11	9	11
G2	Kim Jeong Seok (KOR)	8	7	11	6
A2	Anurak Laowong (THA)	8	6	10
H1	Zhai Xiang (CHN)	11	11	12
E1	Alexander Öhgren (SWE)	5	8	7
F2	Jan Gürtler (GER)	11	11	11
D2	Maciej Nalepka (POL)	8	6	5
B1	Feng Panfeng (CHN)	11	11	11

Quarterfinals
A1	Thomas Schmidberger (GER)	11	11	12
H2	Welder Knaf (BRA)	8	7	10
F1	Zhao Ping (CHN)	3	8	10
D1	Florian Merrien (FRA)	11	11	12
C1	Thomas Bruchle (GER)	11	5	12	4	11
H1	Zhai Xiang (CHN)	2	11	10	11	6
F2	Jan Gürtler (GER)	9	1	11	5
B1	Feng Panfeng (CHN)	11	11	7	11

Semifinals
A1	Thomas Schmidberger (GER)	8	11	9	11	11
D1	Florian Merrien (FRA)	11	9	11	7	7
C1	Thomas Bruchle (GER)	3	4	11	11
B1	Feng Panfeng (CHN)	11	11	5	13

Finals
A1	Thomas Schmidberger (GER)	5	11	9	8
B1	Feng Panfeng (CHN)	11	7	11	11

==== Bronze-medal match ====
Bronze-medal match
D1	Florian Merrien (FRA)	14	7	11	11	11
C1	Thomas Bruchle (GER)	12	11	8	13	4

=== Preliminary round ===
Qualified for the quarterfinals

==== Group A ====
Rank	Athlete	Won	Lost	Points diff
1 Q	Thomas Schmidberger (GER)	2	0	+43
2 Q	Anurak Laowong (THA)	1	1	-12
3	Dacian Makszin (ROU)	0	2	-31

8 September, 08:00

Thomas Schmidberger (GER)	11	11	11
Dacian Makszin (ROU)	2	3	6

8 September, 18:20

Thomas Schmidberger (GER)	11	11	11
Anurak Laowong (THA)	4	5	3

9 September, 18:20

Anurak Laowong (THA)	11	8	11	11
Dacian Makszin (ROU)	8	11	7	6

==== Group B ====
Rank	Athlete	Won	Lost	Points diff
1 Q	Feng Panfeng (CHN)	2	0	+28
2 Q	Yuttajak Glinbancheun (THA)	1	1	-2
3	Egon Kramminger (AUT)	0	2	-26

8 September, 08:00

Feng Panfeng (CHN)	11	11	11
Yuttajak Glinbancheun (THA)	5	8	5

8 September, 18:20

Feng Panfeng (CHN)	11	11	11
Egon Kramminger (AUT)	8	6	6

9 September, 18:20

Egon Kramminger (AUT)	8	6	6
Yuttajak Glinbancheun (THA)	11	11	11

==== Group C ====
Rank	Athlete	Won	Lost	Points diff
1 Q	Thomas Bruchle (GER)	2	0	+12
2 Q	Asama Abu Jame (JOR)	1	1	-3
3	Jeyoung Youngill (KOR)	0	2	-9

8 September, 08:00

Thomas Bruchle (GER)	12	11	8	11
Asama Abu Jame (JOR)	10	9	11	6

8 September, 18:20

Thomas Bruchle (GER)	11	7	14	11
Jeyoung Youngill (KOR)	6	11	12	8

9 September, 18:20

Jeyoung Youngill (KOR)	11	11	4	7	10
Asama Abu Jame (JOR)	7	5	11	11	12

==== Group D ====
Rank	Athlete	Won	Lost	Points diff
1 Q	Florian Merrien (FRA)	2	0	+31
2 Q	Maciej Nalepka (POL)	1	1	-6
3	Miguel Rodríguez Martínez (ESP)	0	2	-25

8 September, 08:00

Florian Merrien (FRA)	11	9	11	11
Miguel Rodríguez Martínez (ESP)	3	11	4	9

8 September, 18:20

Florian Merrien (FRA)	12	11	11
Maciej Nalepka (POL)	10	4	4

9 September, 18:20

Maciej Nalepka (POL)	11	13	13	11	11
Miguel Rodríguez Martínez (ESP)	9	15	15	6	4

==== Group E ====
Rank	Athlete	Won	Lost	Points diff
1 Q	Alexander Öhgren (SWE)	2	0	+21
2 Q	Vasyl Petruniv (UKR)	1	1	+2
3	Ahmed Koleosho (NGR)	0	2	-23

8 September, 08:40

Alexander Öhgren (SWE)	11	11	8	11
Ahmed Koleosho (NGR)	3	8	11	7

8 September, 19:00

Alexander Öhgren (SWE)	11	10	7	12	11
Vasyl Petruniv (UKR)	5	12	11	10	4

9 September, 19:00

Vasyl Petruniv (UKR)	11	11	7	11
Ahmed Koleosho (NGR)	9	7	11	2

==== Group F ====
Rank	Athlete	Won	Lost	Points diff
1 Q	Zhao Ping (CHN)	2	0	+8
2 Q	Jan Gürtler (GER)	1	1	11
3	Sinichi Yoshida (JPN)	0	2	-19

8 September, 08:40

Zhao Ping (CHN)	12	13	12
Sinichi Yoshida (JPN)	10	11	10

8 September, 19:00

Zhao Ping (CHN)	11	10	11	9	14
Jan Gürtler (GER)	9	12	9	11	12

9 September, 17:00

Jan Gürtler (GER)	11	11	6	11
Sinichi Yoshida (JPN)	7	3	11	5

==== Group G ====
Rank	Athlete	Won	Lost	Points diff
1 Q	Gabriel Copola (ARG)	2	0	+21
2 Q	Kim Jeong Seok (KOR)	1	1	-2
3	David Andrade de Freitas (BRA)	0	2	-19

8 September, 08:40

Kim Jeong Seok (KOR)	13	11	11
David Andrade de Freitas (BRA)	11	9	7

8 September, 19:00

Kim Jeong Seok (KOR)	10	7	7
Gabriel Copola (ARG)	12	11	11

9 September, 19:00

Gabriel Copola (ARG)	11	11	11
David Andrade de Freitas (BRA)	8	7	7

==== Group H ====
Rank	Athlete	Won	Lost	Points diff
1 Q	Zhai Xiang (CHN)	2	0	+24
2 Q	Welder Knaf (BRA)	1	1	+17
3	Victor Sjöqvist (SWE)	0	2	-41

8 September, 08:40

Welder Knaf (BRA)	11	11	11
Victor Sjöqvist (SWE)	2	4	6

8 September, 19:00

Welder Knaf (BRA)	11	9	4	12	9
Zhai Xiang (CHN)	6	11	11	10	11

9 September, 19:00

Zhai Xiang (CHN)	12	11	11
Victor Sjöqvist (SWE)	10	1	3
