= Thailand at the 2024 Summer Paralympics =

- Flag of Thailand
- IPC code: THA
- NPC: Paralympic Committee of Thailand

in Paris, France August 28, 2024 – September 8, 2024
- Competitors: 79 in 15 sports
- Flag bearers (opening): Saysunee Jana; Athiwat Paeng-Nuea
- Flag bearer (closing): Chaiwat Rattana
- Medals Ranked 21st: Gold 6 Silver 11 Bronze 13 Total 30

Summer Paralympics appearances (overview)
- 1984; 1988; 1992; 1996; 2000; 2004; 2008; 2012; 2016; 2020; 2024

Thailand competed at the 2024 Summer Paralympics in Paris, France, from 28 August to 8 September.

== Medalists ==
The following Thai competitors won medals at the games. In the discipline sections below, the medalists' names are bolded.

Medal	Name	Sport	Event	Date
Gold	Pongsakorn Paeyo	Athletics	Men's 400 metres T53	1 September
Gold	Worawut Saengampa	Boccia	Men's individual BC2	1 September
Gold	Chaiwat Rattana	Athletics	Men's 100 m T34	2 September
Gold	Saysunee Jana	Wheelchair fencing	Women's sabre B	3 September
Gold	Saysunee Jana	Wheelchair fencing	Women's foil B	4 September
Gold	Saysunee Jana	Wheelchair fencing	Women's épée B	6 September
Silver	Yuttajak Glinbancheun; Wijittra Jaion	Table tennis	Mixed doubles XD7	1 September
Silver	Rungroj Thainiyom; Phisit Wangphonphathanasiri	Table tennis	Men's doubles MD14	1 September
Silver	Athiwat Paeng-nuea	Athletics	Men's 400 metres T54	1 September
Silver	Sujirat Pookkham	Badminton	Singles WH1	2 September
Silver	Pongsakorn Paeyo	Athletics	Men's 100 metres T53	4 September
Silver	Athiwat Paeng-nuea	Athletics	Men's 100 metres T54	4 September
Silver	Pongsakorn Paeyo	Athletics	Men's 800 metres T53	5 September
Silver	Rungroj Thainiyom	Table tennis	Men's individual C6	6 September
Silver	Visit Kingmanaw	Wheelchair fencing	Men's épée B	6 September
Silver	Chaiwat Rattana	Athletics	Men's 800 m T34	7 September
Silver	Wanchai Chaiwut	Table tennis	Men's individual C4	7 September
Bronze	Khwansuda Phuangkitcha	Taekwondo	Women's –47 kg	29 August
Bronze	Dararat Asayut; Chilchitparyak Bootwansirina	Table tennis	Women's doubles WD5	30 August
Bronze	Wanchai Chaiwut; Yuttajak Glinbancheun	Table tennis	Men's doubles MD8	31 August
Bronze	Watcharaphon Vongsa	Boccia	Men's individual BC2	1 September
Bronze	Sujirat Pookkham; Amnouy Wetwithan	Badminton	Women's doubles WH1–WH2	1 September
Bronze	Mongkhon Bunsun	Badminton	Men's singles SL3	2 September
Bronze	Yuttajak Glinbancheun	Table tennis	Men's individual C3	5 September
Bronze	Pornchok Larpyen; Nuanchan Phonsila	Boccia	Mixed pairs BC4	5 September
Bronze	Kamolpan Kraratpet	Powerlifting	Women's 55 kg	5 September
Bronze	Phisit Wangphonphathanasiri	Table tennis	Men's individual C8	6 September
Bronze	Chalermpong Punpoo	Table tennis	Men's individual C7	6 September
Bronze	Saysunee Jana; Aphinya Thongdaeng; Duean Nakprasit	Wheelchair fencing	Women's épée team	7 September
Bronze	Sasirawan Inthachot	Athletics	Women's 200 m T47	7 September

Medals by sport
Sport	1st place, gold medalist(s)	2nd place, silver medalist(s)	3rd place, bronze medalist(s)	Total
Wheelchair fencing	3	1	1	**5**
Athletics	2	5	1	**8**
Boccia	1	0	2	**3**
Table tennis	0	4	5	**9**
Badminton	0	1	2	**3**
Powerlifting	0	0	1	**1**
Taekwondo	0	0	1	**1**
Total	6	11	13	30

Medals by day
Day	Date	1st place, gold medalist(s)	2nd place, silver medalist(s)	3rd place, bronze medalist(s)	Total
1	29 August	0	0	1	**1**
2	30 August	0	0	1	**1**
3	31 August	0	0	1	**1**
4	1 September	2	3	2	**7**
5	2 September	1	1	1	**3**
6	3 September	1	0	0	**1**
7	4 September	1	2	0	**3**
8	5 September	0	1	3	**4**
9	6 September	1	2	2	**5**
10	7 September	0	2	2	**4**
Total		6	11	13	30

Medals by gender
Gender	1st place, gold medalist(s)	2nd place, silver medalist(s)	3rd place, bronze medalist(s)	Total	Percentage
Female	3	1	5	**9**	32%
Male	3	8	6	**17**	61%
Mixed	0	1	1	**2**	7%
Total	6	10	12	28	100%

== Competitors ==
The following is the list of number of competitors in the Games.

Sport	Men	Women	Total
Archery	2	1	3
Athletics	11	4	15
Badminton	3	5	8
Boccia	5	3	8
Cycling	2	3	5
Judo	1	0	1
Paracanoeing	1	1	2
Powerlifting	0	2	2
Rowing	1	1	2
Shooting	2	4	6
Swimming	3	2	5
Table tennis	7	5	12
Taekwondo	2	2	4
Wheelchair fencing	1	3	4
Wheelchair tennis	1	0	1
Total	30	20	78

== Archery ==
Thailand secured three quota places in recurve event and men compound event by virtue of their result at the 2023 World Para Archery Championships in Plzeň, Czech Republic.

Athlete	Event	Ranking Round		Round of 32	Round of 16	Quarterfinals	Semifinals	Finals	
Athlete	Event	Score	Seed	Opposition Score	Opposition Score	Opposition Score	Opposition Score	Opposition Score	Rank
Comsan Singpirom	Men's individual compound	686	18	Sundar (IND); W 138*-138	He (CHN); L 142-146	Did not advance			
Hanreuchai Netsiri	Men's individual recurve	624	13	Tsymbaliuk (UKR); M 6-5	Sadık (TUR); L 4-6	Did not advance			
Phattharaphon Pattawaeo	Women's individual recurve	571	13	Jang (KOR); W 6-0	Wu (CHN); L 0-6	Did not advance			
Phattharaphon Pattawaeo; Hanreuchai Netsiri	Mixed team recurve	1195	8	—N/a	Indonesia; L 0-6	Did not advance			

== Athletics ==
Thai track and field athletes achieved quota places for the following events based on their results at the 2023 World Championships, 2024 World Championships, or through high performance allocation, as long as they meet the minimum entry standard (MES).

Key

- Note–Ranks given for track events are within the athlete's heat only
- Q = Qualified for the next round
- q = Qualified for the next round as a fastest loser or, in field events, by position without achieving the qualifying target
- DQ = Disqualified
- PR = Paralympic Record
- AR = Area (or continental) Record
- NR = National Record
- SB = Season's Best
- N/A = Round not applicable for the event
- Bye = Athlete not required to compete in round

Track & road events
Men

Athlete	Event	Heat		Final	
Athlete	Event	Result	Rank	Result	Rank
Kissanapong Tisuwan	Men's 400 m T12	50.68	2 SB	Did not advance	
Jakkarin Dammunee	Men's 100 m T13	12.83	6	Did not advance	
Jakkarin Dammunee	Men's 400 m T13	—N/a		DNS	
Chaiwat Rattana	Men's 100 m T34	14.81 PR	1 Q	14.76 PR	1st place, gold medalist(s)
Chaiwat Rattana	Men's 800 m T34	1:38.61	2 Q	1:39.48	2nd place, silver medalist(s)
Pichet Krungget	Men's 100 m T53	15.48	4 q	15.38	6
Pichet Krungget	Men's 400 m T53	48.90	2 Q	48.62	4
Pichet Krungget	Men's 800 m T53	—N/a		1:40.71	5
Masaberee Arsae	Men's 100 m T53	16.03	5	Did not advance	
Masaberee Arsae	Men's 400 m T53	51.03	3 Q	50.45	7
Masaberee Arsae	Men's 800 m T53	—N/a		1:40.91	6
Pongsakorn Paeyo	Men's 100 m T53	14.99	2 Q	14.66 SB	2nd place, silver medalist(s)
Pongsakorn Paeyo	Men's 400 m T53	46.67 SB	1 Q	46.77	1st place, gold medalist(s)
Pongsakorn Paeyo	Men's 800 m T53	—N/a		1:38.26	2nd place, silver medalist(s)
Athiwat Paeng-Nuea	Men's 100 m T54	13.71	1 Q	13.79	2nd place, silver medalist(s)
Athiwat Paeng-Nuea	Men's 400 m T54	45.68	2 Q	44.67 SB	2nd place, silver medalist(s)
Athiwat Paeng-Nuea	Men's 800 m T54	1:35.93	1 Q	1:31.27	6
Phiphatphong Sianglam	Men's 100 m T54	14.52 SB	4 q	14.84	8
Phiphatphong Sianglam	Men's 400 m T54	47.21	4 q	46.59	7
Phiphatphong Sianglam	Men's 1500 m T54	3:05.26	4 Q	2:53.71	4
Saichon Konjen	Men's 800 m T54	1:33.81	5 q	1:31.60	7
Saichon Konjen	Men's 1500 m T54	DNS		Did not advance	
Saichon Konjen	Men's 5000 m T54	11:17.91	2 Q	10:56.26	5
Putharet Khongrak	Men's 400 m T54	47.46	5	Did not advance	
Putharet Khongrak	Men's 800 m T54	1:41.11	6	Did not advance	
Putharet Khongrak	Men's 1500 m T54	2:58.57	6	Did not advance	
Putharet Khongrak	Men's 5000 m T54	11:18.53	3 Q	DNF	
Phalathip Khamta	Men's 100 m T63	12.92	5	Did not advance	

Women

Athlete	Event	Heat		Semifinal		Final	
Athlete	Event	Result	Rank	Result	Rank	Result	Rank
Suneeporn Tanomwong	Women's 400 m T11	1:02.95	2 q	1:03.19	4	Did not advance	
Aorawan Chimpaen	Women's 100 m T37	15.25	5	Did not advance			
Aorawan Chimpaen	Women's 200 m T37	—N/a				33.04	8
Orawan Kaising	Women's 400 m T20	1:02.52	6	Did not advance			
Sasirawan Inthachot	Women's 100 m T47	12.69 PB	6	Did not advance			
Sasirawan Inthachot	Women's 200 m T47	25.39 SB	2 Q	—N/a		25.20 SB	3rd place, bronze medalist(s)

== Badminton ==
Thailand has qualified seven para badminton players for the following events, through the release of BWF para-badminton Race to Paris Paralympic Ranking.

Men

Athlete	Event	Group Stage				Quarterfinal	Semifinal	Final / BM	
Athlete	Event	Opposition Score	Opposition Score	Opposition Score	Rank	Opposition Score	Opposition Score	Opposition Score	Rank
Mongkhon Bunsun	Men's singles SL3	Yang (CHN); W (21–14, 21–9)	Sarkar (IND); W (21–19, 21–8)	Nitesh (IND); L (13–21, 14–21)	2 Q	—N/a	Bethell (GBR); L (7–21, 9–21)	Fujihara (JPN); W (21–15, 21–15)	3rd place, bronze medalist(s)
Siripong Teamarrom	Men's singles SL4	Burhanuddin (MAS); L (14–21, 20–22)	Kadam (IND); L (12–21, 12–21)	—N/a	3	Did not advance			
Natthapong Meechai	Men's singles SH6	Krajewski (USA); W (21–13, 22–20)	Nagar (IND); W (22–20, 11–3) ret'd	—N/a	1 Q	Coombs (GBR); L (15–21, 21–18, 11–21)	Did not advance		

Women

Athlete	Event	Group Stage				Quarterfinal	Semifinal	Final / BM	
Athlete	Event	Opposition Score	Opposition Score	Opposition Score	Rank	Opposition Score	Opposition Score	Opposition Score	Rank
Sujirat Pookkham	Singles WH1	Torres (BRA); W (21–3, 21–11)	Hu (TPE); W (21–8, 21–6)	Yuka (CAN); W (21–3, 21–1)	1 Q	Bye	To (BEL); W (21–13, 21–15)	Satomi (JPN); L (21–18, 13–21, 18–21)	2nd place, silver medalist(s)
Amnouy Wetwithan	Singles WH2	Ginns (AUS); W ret'd	Jung (KOR); W (21–10, 20–22, 21–9)	—N/a	1 Q	Yamazaki (JPN); L (14–21, 16–21)	Did not advance		
Darunee Henpraiwan	Singles SL3	Xiao (CHN); L (7–21, 12–21)	Yıldız (TUR); L (12–21, 18–21)	Ito (JPN); W (21–23, 21–7, 21–5)	3	Did not advance			
Nipada Saensupa	Singles SL4	Sagøy (NOR); L (8–21, 3–21)	Fujino (JPN); L (13–21, 11–21)	—N/a	3	Did not advance			
Chai Saeyang	Singles SH6	Li (CHN); L (5–21, 5–21)	Póveda (PER); L (15–21, 7–21)	Marlina (INA); L (8–21, 12–21)	4	Did not advance			
Sujirat Pookkham; Amnouy Wetwithan	Doubles WH1–2	Mathez / Renggli (SUI); W (23–25, 23–21, 21–19)	Hu / Yang (TPE); W (21–11, 21–8)	—N/a	1 Q	—N/a	Satomi / Yamazaki (JPN); L (16–21, 13–21)	Mathez / Renggli (SUI); W (22–20, 27–25)	3rd place, bronze medalist(s)

Mixed

Athlete	Event	Group Stage				Semifinal	Final / BM	
Athlete	Event	Opposition Score	Opposition Score	Opposition Score	Rank	Opposition Score	Opposition Score	Rank
Siripong Teamarrom; Nipada Saensupa	Doubles SL3–SU5	Yang J / Yang Qx (CHN); W (21–11, 21–15)	Setiawan / Sadiyah (INA); L (5–21, 17–21)	Imai / Ito (JPN); W (18–21, 21–18, 21–19)	2 Q	Ramdani / Oktila (INA); L (12–21, 8–21)	Mazur / Noël (FRA); L (14–21, 16–21)	4
Natthapong Meechai; Chai Saeyang	Doubles SH6	Krajewski / Simon (USA); W (21–12, 21–17)	Solaimalai / Sre Sivan (IND); L (7–21, 17–21)	—N/a	3	Did not advance		

== Boccia ==
Thailand entered three athletes into the Paralympics games, by virtue of their result as the highest rank nation's in the BC1/BC2 team event, at the 2023 Asia/Oceania Regional Championship in Hong Kong; the nations also secured two additional quotas in mixed pairs BC3 and BC4, through final world ranking.

Athlete	Event	Pool matches				Playoff round	Quarterfinal	Semifinals	Final / BM	
Athlete	Event	Opposition Score	Opposition Score	Opposition Score	Rank	Opposition Score	Opposition Score	Opposition Score	Opposition Score	Rank
Witsanu Huadpradit	Men's individual BC1	Jung S-j (KOR); W 7–3	Sanchez (MEX); W 4–3	—N/a	1 Q	—N/a	Loung (HKG); L 3–5	Did not advance		
Worawut Saengampa	Men's individual BC2	Ben Youb (TUN); W 13–1	Seo (KOR); W 5–3	Rombouts (BEL); W 11–0	1 Q	—N/a	Sugimura (JPN); W 5–3	Vongsa (THA); W 9–1	Herlangga (INA); W 6–1	1st place, gold medalist(s)
Watcharaphon Vongsa	Men's individual BC2	Meguenni (FRA); W 5*–5	Sayes (ESA); W 11–0	Mezík (SVK); L 1–5	2 Q	Araujo (POR); W 6–1	Santos (BRA); W 3*–3	Saengampa (THA); L 1–9	Mezík (SVK); W 3–2	3rd place, bronze medalist(s)
Akkadej Choochuenklin	Men's individual BC3	Goncalves (POR); W 9–0	Jeong (KOR); L 0–4	Romero (COL); W 10–0	2 Q	—N/a	Polychronidis (GRE); L 1–4	Did not advance		
Pornchok Larpyen	Men's individual BC4	Allam (EGY); W 11–0	Nicolai (GER); W 5–4	Grisales (COL); L 1–5	2 Q	—N/a	Komar (CRO); L 1–5	Did not advance		
Ladamanee Kla-Han	Women's individual BC3	Owczarz (POL); L 2–3	Cermakova (CZE); W 9–0	Heckel (FRA); W 4–1	2 Q	—N/a	Ho Y K (HKG); L 2–3	Did not advance		
Nuanchan Phonsila	Women's individual BC4	Vozarova (SVK); W 11–0	Lin (CHN); L 2–6	Cheung (HKG); L 2–5	3	—N/a	Did not advance			
Witsanu Huadpradit; Watcharaphon Vongsa; Satanan Phromsiri	Mixed team BC1/BC2	Slovakia; L 2–9	Brazil; L 3–7	—N/a	3	—N/a	Did not advance			
Akkadej Choochuenklin; Ladamanee Kla-Han	Mixed pairs BC3	Great Britain; W 7–0	South Korea; W 5–2	—N/a	1 Q	—N/a	France; W 6–1	Hong Kong; L 2–3	Argentina; L 2–4	4
Pornchok Larpyen; Nuanchan Phonsila	Mixed pairs BC4	Spain; W 8–2	Slovakia; W 8–1	—N/a	1 Q	—N/a	Egypt; W 11–0	Colombia; L 1–4	Canada; W 6–1	3rd place, bronze medalist(s)

== Cycling ==
Thailand entered two para-cyclists (one in each gender) after finished the top eligible nation's at the 2022 UCI Nation's ranking allocation ranking.

=== Road ===
Athlete	Event	Time	Rank
Sumas Panalai	Men's road race H4	1:49:03	8
Sumas Panalai	Men's time trial H4	48:50.86	10
Atachai Sriwichai	Men's road race H5	1:40:25	6
Atachai Sriwichai	Men's time trial H5	51:17.72	7
Watcharobon Boonmalert	Women's road race B	–1 LAP	
Watcharobon Boonmalert	Women's time trial B	49:25.00	9
Darin Sheepchondan	Women's road time trial H1-3	35:56.81	9
Naphatsakorn Rodklang	Women's road race H1-4	1:30:40	15
Naphatsakorn Rodklang	Women's road time trial H1-3	40:05.80	10
Darin Sheepchondan; Sumas Panalai; Atachai Sriwichai	Mixed team relay H1–5	–6 LAP	

=== Track ===
Athlete	Event	Qualification		Final	
Athlete	Event	Time	Rank	Time	Rank
Watcharobon Boonmalert	Women's time trial B	1:17.748	10	Did not advance	
Watcharobon Boonmalert	Women's pursuit B	3:56.599	9	Did not advance	

== Judo ==
Athlete	Event	Round of 16	Quarterfinals	Semifinals	Repechage	Final / BM	
Athlete	Event	Opposition Result	Opposition Result	Opposition Result	Opposition Result	Opposition Result	Rank
Vitoon Kongsuk	Men's 60 Kg J1	Bouamer (ALG); L 0–10	Did not advance		Oliviera (BRA); L 0–10	Did not advance	

== Paracanoeing ==
Thailand earned quota places for the following events through the 2024 ICF Canoe Sprint World Championships in Szeged, Hungary.

Athlete	Event	Heats		Semifinal		Final	
Athlete	Event	Time	Rank	Time	Rank	Time	Rank
Sinti Wantawee	Men's VL2	1:04.61	6	1:01.83	5	Did not advance	
Wasana Khuthawisap	Women's KL2	1:07.25	4	1:06.27	4 FB	1:04.55	4

Qualification Legend: FA=Final A (medal); FB=Final B (non-medal)

== Powerlifting ==
Athlete	Event	Attempts (kg)				Result (kg)	Rank
Athlete	Event	1	2	3	4	Result (kg)	Rank
Arawan Bootpo	Women's 73 kg	50	55	60	—N/a	60	8
Kamolpan Kraratpet	Women's 55 kg	104	~~106~~	108	—N/a	108	3rd place, bronze medalist(s)

== Rowing ==
Athlete	Event	Heats		Repechage		Final	
Athlete	Event	Time	Rank	Time	Rank	Time	Rank
Chintana Chuesaart; Poramin Phongamthippayakul	PR3 mixed double sculls	8:45.92	6 R	8:43.03	5 FB	8:48.81	5

Qualification Legend: FA=Final A (medal); FB=Final B (non-medal); R=Repechage

== Shooting ==
Thailand entered six para-shooter's after achieved quota places for the following events by virtue of their best finishes at the 2022, 2023 and 2024 world cup, 2022 World Championships, 2023 World Championships and 2022 Asian Para Games, as long as they obtained a minimum qualifying score (MQS) by May 31, 2020.

Men

Athlete	Event	Qualification		Final	
Athlete	Event	Points	Rank	Points	Rank
Atidet Intanon	R7 – 50 m rifle 3 positions SH1	1131	16	Did not advance	

Women

Athlete	Event	Qualification		Final	
Athlete	Event	Points	Rank	Points	Rank
Wannipa Leungvilai	R2 - 10 m air rifle standing SH1	613.3	13	Did not advance	
Wannipa Leungvilai	R8 – 50 m rifle 3 position SH1	1153	10	Did not advance	
Chutima Saenlar	R2 - 10 m air rifle standing SH1	606.3	16	Did not advance	
Chutima Saenlar	R8 – 50 m rifle 3 position SH1	1142	15	Did not advance	
Somporn Muangsiri	P2 - 10 m air pistol SH1	526	17	Did not advance	

Mixed

Athlete	Event	Qualification		Final	
Athlete	Event	Points	Rank	Points	Rank
Somporn Muangsiri	P4 – 50 m pistol SH1	493	28	Did not advance	
Anuson Chaichamnan	R4 10 m air rifle standing SH2	628.1	20	Did not advance	
Anuson Chaichamnan	R5 - 10 m air rifle prone SH2	637.5	2 Q	168.1	6
Anuson Chaichamnan	R9 - 50 m rifle prone SH2	621.2	9	Did not advance	
Chutima Arunmat	R3 - 10 m air rifle prone SH1	634.9	5 Q	167.2	6
Chutima Arunmat	R6 – 50 m rifle prone SH1	616.5	19	Did not advance	
Atidet Intanon	R3 - 10 m air rifle prone SH1	630.1	20	Did not advance	
Atidet Intanon	R6 – 50 m rifle prone SH1	609.9	31	Did not advance	

== Swimming ==
Thailand qualified four swimmers (two male swimmers and two female swimmers), through the Minimum Qualification Standard (MQS) allocation slots.

Men

Athlete	Events	Heats		Final	
Athlete	Events	Time	Rank	Time	Rank
Phuchit Aingchaiyaphum	100 m freestyle S5	1:21.51	9 R	Did not advance	
Phuchit Aingchaiyaphum	200 m freestyle S5	2:56.57	10 R	Did not advance	
Charkorn Kaewsri	50 m freestyle S3	57.89	13	Did not advance	
Charkorn Kaewsri	200 m freestyle S3	4:25.81	12	Did not advance	
Charkorn Kaewsri	50 m backstroke S3	59.08	10 R	Did not advance	
Charkorn Kaewsri	50 m breaststroke SB2	1:16.07	8 Q	1:16.36	8
Charkorn Kaewsri	150 m individual medley SM3	3:51.37	13	Did not advance	
Aekkarin Noithat	50 m butterfly S6	34.32	8 Q	34.19	7
Aekkarin Noithat	200 m individual medley SM6	3:07.93	16	Did not advance	

Women

Athlete	Events	Heats		Final	
Athlete	Events	Time	Rank	Time	Rank
Nattharinee Khajhonmatha	200 m freestyle S14	2:15.50	9 R	Did not advance	
Nattharinee Khajhonmatha	100 m backstroke S14	1:12.88	11	Did not advance	
Nattharinee Khajhonmatha	100 m butterfly S14	1:13.07	15	Did not advance	
Nattharinee Khajhonmatha	200 m individual medley SM14	2:38.74	12	Did not advance	
Wilasini Wongnonthaphoom	200 m freestyle S5	3:32.98	16	Did not advance	
Wilasini Wongnonthaphoom	50 m backstroke S5	47.19	10	Did not advance	
Wilasini Wongnonthaphoom	200 m individual medley SM5	4:45.63	19	Did not advance	

== Table tennis ==
Thailand entered nine athletes for the Paralympic games. Wanchai Chaiwut and Rungroj Thainiyom qualified for Paris 2024 by virtue of their gold medal results, in their respective class, at the 2022 Asian Para Games in Hangzhou.; meanwhile the other athletes qualified through the allocations of ITTF final ranking.

Men

Athlete	Event	Round of 32	Round of 16	Quarterfinals	Semifinals	Final / BM	
Athlete	Event	Opposition Result	Opposition Result	Opposition Result	Opposition Result	Opposition Result	Rank
Thirayu Chueawong	Individual C2	Bye	Cha (KOR); L 0−3	Did not advance			
Yuttajak Glinbancheun	Individual C3	Bye	Copola (ARG); W 3−0	Zhai (CHN); W 3−0	Schmidgerger (GER); L 0−3	Did not advance	3rd place, bronze medalist(s)
Wanchai Chaiwut	Individual C4	—N/a	Addis (AUS); W 3−0	Shichino (JPN); W 3−1	Kim (KOR); W 3−2	Kim (KOR); L 2−3	2nd place, silver medalist(s)
Rungroj Thainiyom	Individual C6	—N/a	Pino (CHI); W 3−0	Alabi (NGR); W 3−0	Rosenmeier (DEN); W 3−2	Parenzan (ITA); L 0−3	2nd place, silver medalist(s)
Chalermpong Punpoo	Individual C7	—N/a	Britz (NZL); W 3−2	Yagi (JPN); W 3−0	Yan (CHN); L 2−3	Did not advance	3rd place, bronze medalist(s)
Phisit Wangphonphathanasiri	Individual C8	Hosseini Pour (RPT); W 3−0	Shilton (GBR); W 3−1	Peng (CHN); W 3−1	Didukh (UKR); L 1−3	Did not advance	3rd place, bronze medalist(s)
Bunpot Sillapakong	Individual C10	—N/a	Misztal (POL); L 0−3	Did not advance			
Wanchai Chaiwut; Yuttajak Glinbancheun	Doubles MD8	—N/a	López / Rodríguez (ESP); W 3−0	Saito / Shichino (JPN); W 3−0	Cao / Feng (CHN); L 2−3	Did not advance	3rd place, bronze medalist(s)
Rungroj Thainiyom; Phisit Wangphonphathanasiri	Doubles MD14	—N/a	Bye	Huang / Cao (CHN); W 3−1	Karabardak / Shilton (GBR); W 3−0	Liao / Yan (CHN); L 1−3	2nd place, silver medalist(s)
Chalermpong Punpoo; Bunpot Sillapakong	Doubles MD18	Bye	Andersson / Gustafsson (SWE); L 1−3	Did not advance			

Women

Athlete	Event	Round of 32	Round of 16	Quarterfinals	Semifinals	Final / BM	
Athlete	Event	Opposition Result	Opposition Result	Opposition Result	Opposition Result	Opposition Result	Rank
Chilchitraryak Bootwansirina	Individual C1–2	—N/a	Azevedo (BRA); W 3−0	Liu (CHN); L 1−3	Did not advance		
Dararat Asayut	Individual C3	—N/a	Santos (BRA); W 3−2	Mužinić Vincetić (CRO); L 1−3	Did not advance		
Patamawadee Intanon	Individual C3	—N/a	Oliveira (BRA); L 1−3	Did not advance			
Wijittra Jaion	Individual C4	—N/a	Gu (CHN); L 0−3	Did not advance			
Panwas Sringam	Individual C5	—N/a	Moon (KOR); L 0−3	Did not advance			
Wijittra Jaion; Panwas Sringam	Doubles WD10	—N/a	Dretar; Mužinić (CRO); L 2−3	Did not advance			
Dararat Asayut / Chilchitraryak Bootwansirina	Doubles WD5	—N/a		Brunelli / Rossi (ITA); W 3-1	Liu / Xue (CHN); L 1−3	Did not advance	3rd place, bronze medalist(s)

Mixed

Athlete	Event	Round of 32	Round of 16	Quarterfinals	Semifinals	Final / BM	
Athlete	Event	Opposition Result	Opposition Result	Opposition Result	Opposition Result	Opposition Result	Rank
Yuttajak Glinbancheun; Wijittra Jaion	Doubles XD7	Bye	Lamirault / Saint-Pierre (FRA); W 3−0	Brüchle / Mikolaschek (GER); W 3−2	Zhai / Gu (CHN); W 3−1	Feng / Zhou (CHN); L 1−3	2nd place, silver medalist(s)

== Taekwondo ==
Thailand entered four athletes to compete at the Paralympics competition. Khwansuda Phuangkitcha qualified for Paris 2024, by virtue of finishing within the top six in the Paralympic rankings in women's 47 kg class. Later on, Thanwa Kaenkham (men's under 58 kg), Tanapan Sotthiset (men's under 70 kg) and Jiraporn Wongduwan (women's above 65 kg) qualified for the games, in their respective class, after winning the gold medal at the 2024 Asian Qualification Tournament in Tai'an, China.

Athlete	Event	First round	Quarterfinals	Semifinals	Repechage 1	Repechage 2	Final / BM	
Athlete	Event	Opposition Result	Opposition Result	Opposition Result	Opposition Result	Opposition Result	Opposition Result	Rank
Thanwa Kaenkham	Men's –58 kg	Galeano (ARG); W 12–10	Yasur (ISR); L 6–23	—N/a	Kong (FRA); W 21–3	—N/a	Zeynalov (AZE); L 4–12	
Tanapan Sotthiset	Men's –70 kg	Samorano (ARG); L 10–14	Did not advance					
Khwansuda Phuangkitcha	Women's –47 kg	Bye	Ekinci (TUR); W 8–4	Isakova (UZB); L 8–4	—N/a	—N/a	Abdollahpour Deroei (IRI); W 4–4	3rd place, bronze medalist(s)
Jiraporn Wongsuwan	Women's +65 kg	Akermach (MAR); L 4–28	Did not advance					

== Wheelchair fencing ==
Athlete	Event	Round of 32	Round of 16	Quarterfinal	Semifinal	Repechage 1	Repechage 2	Repechage 3	Repechage 4	Final / BM	
Athlete	Event	Opposition Score	Opposition Score	Opposition Score	Opposition Score	Opposition Score	Opposition Score	Opposition Score	Opposition Score	Opposition Score	Rank
Visit Kingmanaw	Men's foil B	—N/a	Oleg Naumenko (UKR); W 15–2	Dimitri Coutya (GBR); L 5–15	Did not advance		Michinobu Fujita (JPN); W 15–9	Michele Massa (ITA); L 11–15	Did not advance		
Visit Kingmanaw	Men's sabre B	—N/a	Maxime Valet (FRA); L 9–15	Did not advance		Dmytro Serozhenko (UKR); L 7–15	Did not advance				
Visit Kingmanaw	Men's épée B	Bye	Michinobu Fujita (JPN); W 15–5	Ammar Ali (IRQ); W 15–13	Zhang Jie (CHN); W 15–13	—N/a				Dimitri Coutya (GBR); L 10–15	2nd place, silver medalist(s)
Duean Nakprasit	Women's épée A	Zsuzsanna Krajnyák (HUN); L 7–15	Did not advance								
Duean Nakprasit	Women's sabre A	Carminha Oliveira (BRA); L 7–15	Did not advance								
Aphinya Thongdaeng	Women's foil A	Brianna Vide (FRA); L 11–15	Did not advance								
Aphinya Thongdaeng	Women's épée A	Bye	Chen Yuandong (CHN); L 4–15	Did not advance		Clémence Delavoipiere (FRA); W 15–12	Brianna Vide (FRA); W 15–11	Yevheniia Breus (UKR); L 9–15	Did not advance		
Saysunee Jana	Women's foil B	—N/a	Bye	Chung Yuen Ping (HKG); W 15–8	Anri Sakurai (JPN); W 15–14	—N/a				Xiao Rong (CHN); W 15–11	(gold)
Saysunee Jana	Women's sabre B	—N/a	Monica Santos (BRA); W 15–2	Eun Hye Cho (KOR); W 15–3	Olena Fedota-Isaieva (UKR); W 15–9	—N/a				Xiao Rong (CHN); W 15–14	(gold)
Saysunee Jana	Women's épée B	—N/a	Bye	Olena Fedota-Isaieva (UKR); W 15–6	Tong Nga Ting (HKG); W 15–7	—N/a				Kang Su (CHN); W 15–7	(gold)
Saysunee Jana; Aphinya Thongdaeng; Duean Nakprasit	Women's épée team	—N/a	Bye	South Korea W 45–42	Ukraine L 42–45	—N/a				France W 45–40	3rd place, bronze medalist(s)
Saysunee Jana; Aphinya Thongdaeng; Duean Nakprasit	Women's foil team	—N/a	South Korea; L 42–45	Did not advance							

== Wheelchair tennis ==
Athlete	Event	Round of 64	Round of 32	Round of 16	Quarterfinals	Semifinals	Final / BM	
Athlete	Event	Opposition Result	Opposition Result	Opposition Result	Opposition Result	Opposition Result	Opposition Result	Rank
Sakhorn Khanthasit	Women's singles	—N/a	Tanaka (JPN); L 0−2	Did not advance				

== See also ==
- Thailand at the 2024 Summer Olympics
- Thailand at the Paralympics
