= Table tennis at the 2012 Summer Paralympics – Men's individual – Class 3 =

Table tennis Men's C3 at the XIV Paralympic Games
- Venue: ExCeL Exhibition Centre
- Dates: August 30-September 2, 2012
- Competitors: 24 from 15 nations

Medalists
| 1st place, gold medalist(s) | | Panfeng Feng | China |
| 2nd place, silver medalist(s) | | Zlatko Kesler | Serbia |
| 3rd place, bronze medalist(s) | | Thomas Schmidberger | Germany |

The Men's individual table tennis - Class 3 tournament at the 2012 Summer Paralympics in London is taking place from 30 August to 2 September 2012 at ExCeL Exhibition Centre. Classes 1-5 are for athletes with a physical impairment that affects their legs, and who compete in a sitting position. The lower the number, the greater the impact the impairment has on an athlete’s ability to compete.

In the preliminary stage, athletes compete in eight groups of three. Winners of each group qualify for the quarter-finals.

== Results ==
All times are local (BST/UTC+1)

=== Finals ===
Quarter-finals: 1 Sep 12:30
A1 | Feng Panfeng (CHN) | 11 | 11 | 11
H1 | Tomas Piñas (ESP) | 7 | 9 | 5
E1 | Thomas Bruechle (GER) | 6 | 8 | 11 | 7
D1 | Florian Merrien (FRA) | 11 | 11 | 7 | 11
C1 | Zhao Ping (CHN) | 12 | 11 | 7 | 9 | 9
F1 | Zlatko Kesler (SRB) | 10 | 8 | 11 | 11 | 11
G1 | Jean-Philippe Robin (FRA) | 9 | 2 | 11 | 11
B1 | Thomas Schmidberger (GER) | 11 | 11 | 7 | 13

Semifinals: 1 Sep 18:15
A1 | Feng Panfeng (CHN) | 11 | 11 | 14
D1 | Florian Merrien (FRA) | 8 | 5 | 12
F1 | Zlatko Kesler (SRB) | 11 | 11 | 11
B1 | Thomas Schmidberger (GER) | 6 | 9 | 9

Gold medal match: 2 Sep 10:15
A1 | Feng Panfeng (CHN) | 14 | 11 | 11
F1 | Zlatko Kesler (SRB) | 12 | 6 | 8
Bronze medal match
D1 | Florian Merrien (FRA) | 11 | 7 | 10 | 13
B1 | Thomas Schmidberger (GER) | 7 | 11 | 12 | 15

=== Preliminary round ===
| Qualified for the quarter-finals |

==== Group A ====
| Athlete | Won | Lost | Games diff | Points diff |
|---|---|---|---|---|
| Feng Panfeng (CHN) | 2 | 0 | +6 | +18 |
| Kim Jin-sung (KOR) | 1 | 1 | -2 | –13 |
| Jaroslav Hadrava (CZE) | 0 | 2 | -4 | –5 |

30 August, 09:00

| Feng Panfeng (CHN) | 11 | 11 | 11 |
| Kim Jin-sung (KOR) | 8 | 4 | 3 |

30 August, 19:20

| Kim Jin-sung (KOR) | 13 | 11 | 6 | 9 | 11 |
| Jaroslav Hadrava (CZE) | 11 | 7 | 11 | 11 | 5 |

31 August, 18:00

| Feng Panfeng (CHN) | 11 | 11 | 11 |
| Jaroslav Hadrava (CZE) | 4 | 5 | 6 |

==== Group B ====
| Athlete | Won | Lost | Games diff | Points diff |
|---|---|---|---|---|
| Thomas Schmidberger (GER) | 2 | 0 | +6 | +17 |
| Kim Jeong Seok (KOR) | 1 | 1 | -1 | +7 |
| Yann Guilhem (FRA) | 0 | 2 | -5 | –24 |

30 August, 09:00

| Thomas Schmidberger (GER) | 11 | 11 | 11 |
| Yann Guilhem (FRA) | 7 | 4 | 5 |

30 August, 19:20

| Yann Guilhem (FRA) | 9 | 9 | 11 | 4 |
| Kim Jeong Seok (KOR) | 11 | 11 | 7 | 11 |

31 August, 18:00

| Thomas Schmidberger (GER) | 14 | 11 | 14 |
| Kim Jeong Seok (KOR) | 12 | 6 | 12 |

==== Group C ====
| Athlete | Won | Lost | Games diff | Points diff |
|---|---|---|---|---|
| Zhao Ping (CHN) | 2 | 0 | +4 | +9 |
| Jeyoung Young Ill (KOR) | 1 | 1 | +1 | +5 |
| Jan Gürtler (GER) | 0 | 2 | -5 | –14 |

30 August, 09:00

| Zhao Ping (CHN) | 11 | 13 | 8 | 11 |
| Jeyoung Young Ill (KOR) | 9 | 11 | 11 | 3 |

30 August, 19:20

| Jeyoung Young Ill (KOR) | 11 | 11 | 11 |
| Jan Gürtler (GER) | 9 | 5 | 5 |

31 August, 18:00

| Zhao Ping (CHN) | 7 | 11 | 11 | 11 |
| Jan Gürtler (GER) | 11 | 6 | 6 | 3 |

==== Group D ====
| Athlete | Won | Lost | Games diff | Points diff |
|---|---|---|---|---|
| Florian Merrien (FRA) | 2 | 0 | +5 | +28 |
| Gabriel Copola (ARG) | 1 | 1 | +1 | +9 |
| Liran Geva (ISR) | 0 | 2 | -6 | –37 |

30 August, 09:00

| Florian Merrien (FRA) | 12 | 11 | 6 | 11 |
| Gabriel Copola (ARG) | 10 | 8 | 11 | 3 |

30 August, 19:20

| Gabriel Copola (ARG) | 11 | 11 | 11 |
| Liran Geva (ISR) | 4 | 4 | 8 |

31 August, 18:00

| Florian Merrien (FRA) | 11 | 11 | 11 |
| Liran Geva (ISR) | 1 | 6 | 6 |

==== Group E ====
| Athlete | Won | Lost | Games diff | Points diff |
|---|---|---|---|---|
| Thomas Bruechle (GER) | 2 | 0 | +5 | +14 |
| Egon Kramminger (AUT) | 1 | 1 | 0 | +13 |
| Miguel Rodríguez (ESP) | 0 | 2 | -5 | –27 |

30 August, 09:40

| Thomas Bruechle (GER) | 11 | 11 | 10 | 11 |
| Miguel Rodríguez (ESP) | 5 | 4 | 12 | 8 |

30 August, 20:00

| Miguel Rodríguez (ESP) | 9 | 5 | 6 |
| Egon Kramminger (AUT) | 11 | 11 | 11 |

31 August, 18:40

| Thomas Bruechle (GER) | 11 | 11 | 12 |
| Egon Kramminger (AUT) | 7 | 9 | 10 |

==== Group F ====
| Athlete | Won | Lost | Games diff | Points diff |
|---|---|---|---|---|
| Zlatko Kesler (SRB) | 2 | 0 | +3 | +9 |
| Welder Knaf (BRA) | 1 | 1 | +2 | +16 |
| Manfred Dollmann (AUT) | 0 | 2 | -5 | –25 |

30 August, 09:40

| Zlatko Kesler (SRB) | 15 | 10 | 11 | 13 |
| Manfred Dollmann (AUT) | 13 | 12 | 4 | 11 |

30 August, 20:00

| Manfred Dollmann (AUT) | 11 | 3 | 5 |
| Welder Knaf (BRA) | 13 | 11 | 11 |

31 August, 18:40

| Zlatko Kesler (SRB) | 7 | 11 | 5 | 11 | 14 |
| Welder Knaf (BRA) | 11 | 8 | 11 | 9 | 12 |

==== Group G ====
| Athlete | Won | Lost | Games diff | Points diff |
|---|---|---|---|---|
| Jean-Philippe Robin (FRA) | 2 | 0 | +4 | +14 |
| Ko Hang Yee (HKG) | 1 | 1 | +2 | +7 |
| Egbinola Oluade (NGR) | 0 | 2 | -6 | –21 |

30 August, 09:40

| Jean-Philippe Robin (FRA) | 11 | 11 | 11 |
| Egbinola Oluade (NGR) | 7 | 8 | 4 |

30 August, 20:00

| Egbinola Oluade (NGR) | 8 | 11 | 10 |
| Ko Hang Yee (HKG) | 11 | 13 | 12 |

31 August, 18:40

| Jean-Philippe Robin (FRA) | 15 | 7 | 13 | 3 | 11 |
| Ko Hang Yee (HKG) | 13 | 11 | 11 | 11 | 4 |

==== Group H ====
| Athlete | Won | Lost | Games diff | Points diff |
|---|---|---|---|---|
| Tomas Piñas (ESP) | 1 | 1 | +1 | +12 |
| Alexander Öhgren (SWE) | 1 | 1 | +1 | –5 |
| Dacian Makszin (ROU) | 1 | 1 | -2 | –7 |

30 August, 09:40

| Tomas Piñas (ESP) | 11 | 11 | 11 |
| Dacian Makszin (ROU) | 9 | 4 | 8 |

30 August, 20:00

| Dacian Makszin (ROU) | 11 | 7 | 10 | 11 | 11 |
| Alexander Öhgren (SWE) | 9 | 11 | 12 | 4 | 9 |

31 August, 18:40

| Tomas Piñas (ESP) | 11 | 4 | 11 | 10 |
| Alexander Öhgren (SWE) | 13 | 11 | 9 | 12 |
