= Table tennis at the 2024 Summer Paralympics – Men's individual – Class 3 =

Men's singles MS3 at the XVII Paralympic Games
- Venue: South Paris Arena 4, Paris
- Dates: 1 – 5 September 2024
- Competitors: 20 from 16 nations

Medalists
1st place, gold medalist(s)		Feng Panfeng	China
2nd place, silver medalist(s)		Thomas Schmidberger	Germany
3rd place, bronze medalist(s)		Yuttajak Glinbancheun	Thailand
3rd place, bronze medalist(s)		Jang Yeong-jin	South Korea

The men's singles – Class 3 tournament at the 2024 Summer Paralympics in Paris took place between 1 and 5 September 2024 at South Paris Arena 4.

== Schedule ==
The schedule are as below:

P	Preliminary round	¼	Quarter-finals	½	Semi-finals	G	Gold medal match

Events	Dates							
Events	Sun 1 Sep		Mon 2 Sep		Tue 3 Sep		Thu 5 Sep	
Events	M	E	M	E	M	E	M	E
Men's singles MS3		P			¼		½	G

== Results ==
=== Medal matches ===
Semi-finals
1	Feng Panfeng (CHN)	11	11	11
7	Jang Yeong-jin (KOR)	9	4	9
3	Yuttajak Glinbancheun (THA)	4	8	8
2	Thomas Schmidberger (GER)	11	11	11

Gold medal match
1	Feng Panfeng (CHN)	11	11	11
2	Thomas Schmidberger (GER)	2	7	7

=== Top half ===
==== Section 1 ====
Round of 32
10	Alexander Öhgren (SWE)	12	11	8
18	Eder Rodriguez (ESP)	14	13	11

Round of 16
1	Feng Panfeng (CHN)	11	11	11
11	Colin Judge (IRL)	7	8	3
18	Eder Rodriguez (ESP)	6	8	6
6	Thomas Brüchle (GER)	11	11	11

Quarter-finals
1	Feng Panfeng (CHN)	12	7	11	11
6	Thomas Brüchle (GER)	10	11	9	7

==== Section 2 ====
Round of 32
19	Khaled Ramadan (EGY)	6	5	13	10
12	Maciej Nalepka (POL)	11	11	11	12

Round of 16
7	Jang Yeong-jin (KOR)	11	5	11	12
12	Maciej Nalepka (POL)	6	11	4	10
15	Sylvain Noël (FRA)	8	11	3	9
4	Jenson Van Emburgh (USA)	11	8	11	11

Quarter-finals
7	Jang Yeong-jin (KOR)	11	6	11	8	11
4	Jenson Van Emburgh (USA)	8	11	7	11	9

=== Bottom half ===
==== Section 3 ====
Round of 32
14	Petr Svatoš (CZE)	11	4	9
17	Roberto Quijada (VEN)	13	11	11

Round of 16
3	Yuttajak Glinbancheun (THA)	11	12	11
16	Gabriel Copola (ARG)	5	10	6
17	Roberto Quijada (VEN)	3	4	10
8	Zhai Xiang (CHN)	11	11	12

Quarter-finals
3	Yuttajak Glinbancheun (THA)	13	11	11
8	Zhai Xiang (CHN)	11	6	5

==== Section 4 ====
Round of 32
20	Jessy Chen (AUS)	7	5	5
9	Baek Young-bok (KOR)	11	11	11

Round of 16
5	Florian Merrien (FRA)	8	11	11	11
9	Baek Young-bok (KOR)	11	7	7	5
13	Vasyl Petruniv (UKR)	8	11	8	5
2	Thomas Schmidberger (GER)	11	8	11	11

Quarter-finals
5	Florian Merrien (FRA)	7	4	4
2	Thomas Schmidberger (GER)	11	11	11
