= Table tennis at the 2024 Summer Paralympics – Men's doubles MD8 =

Men's doubles MD8 at the XVII Paralympic Games
- Venue: South Paris Arena 4, Paris
- Dates: 29 – 31 August 2024
- Competitors: 32 from 14 nations

Medalists
1st place, gold medalist(s)		Cao Ningning; Feng Panfeng	China
2nd place, silver medalist(s)		Valentin Baus; Thomas Schmidberger	Germany
3rd place, bronze medalist(s)		Wanchai Chaiwut; Yuttajak Glinbancheun	Thailand
3rd place, bronze medalist(s)		Abdullah Öztürk; Nesim Turan	Turkey

The men's doubles – Class 8 tournament at the 2024 Summer Paralympics in Paris took place between 29 and 31 August 2024 at South Paris Arena 4.

== Schedule ==
The schedule are as below:

P	Preliminary round	¼	Quarter-finals	½	Semi-finals	G	Gold medal match

Events	Dates					
Events	Thu 29 Aug		Fri 30 Aug		Sat 31 Aug	
Events	M	E	M	E	M	E
Men's doubles MD8	P	¼		½	G	

== Results ==
=== Gold medal match ===
Gold medal match
5	Cao NN (CHN); Feng PF (CHN)	11	11	11
2	V Baus (GER); T Schmidberger (GER)	9	5	5

=== Top half ===
Round of 16
1	W Chaiwut (THA); Y Glinbancheun (THA)	11	11	11
9	F J López (ESP); E Rodríguez (ESP)	2	0	8
16	C Addis (AUS); J Chen (AUS)	8	5	4
7	G Saito (JPN); K Shichino (JPN)	11	11	11
5	Cao NN (CHN); Feng PF (CHN)	11	11	11
14	V Petruniv (UKR); O Yezyk (UKR)	6	6	4
10	P Mihálik (SVK); B Trávníček (SVK)	8	5	7
4	E Martin (FRA); M Thomas (FRA)	11	11	11

Quarter-finals
1	W Chaiwut (THA); Y Glinbancheun (THA)	11	11	11
7	G Saito (JPN); K Shichino (JPN)	4	6	7
5	Cao NN (CHN); Feng PF (CHN)	12	11	11
4	E Martin (FRA); M Thomas (FRA)	10	4	7

Semi-finals
1	W Chaiwut (THA); Y Glinbancheun (THA)	11	7	6	11	9
5	Cao NN (CHN); Feng PF (CHN)	8	11	11	6	11

=== Bottom half ===
Round of 16
3	Kim J-g (KOR); Kim Y-g (KOR)	11	16	11
15	L Flores (CHI); M Rodríguez (CHI)	7	14	5
13	G Copola (ARG); E Romero (ARG)	11	6	11	5
6	A Öztürk (TUR); N Turan (TUR)	13	11	7	11
8	F Merrien (FRA); N Savant-Aira (FRA)	5	11	5	11
11	Liu F (CHN); Zhai X (CHN)	11	6	11	13
12	F Nacházel (CZE); P Svatoš (CZE)	6	6	6
2	V Baus (GER); T Schmidberger (GER)	11	11	11

Quarter-finals
3	Kim J-g (KOR); Kim Y-g (KOR)	4	7	6
6	A Öztürk (TUR); N Turan (TUR)	11	11	11
11	Liu F (CHN); Zhai X (CHN)	11	14	9	9	10
2	V Baus (GER); T Schmidberger (GER)	6	12	11	11	12

Semi-finals
6	A Öztürk (TUR); N Turan (TUR)	7	11	11	11	3
2	V Baus (GER); T Schmidberger (GER)	11	6	13	2	11
