= Table tennis at the 2012 Summer Paralympics – Men's team – Class 3 =

Table tennis men's team C3 at the XIV Paralympic Games
- Venue: ExCeL Exhibition Centre
- Dates: September 5 - September 7, 2012
- Competitors: 7

Medalists
1st place, gold medalist(s)		Zhao Ping; Feng Panfeng	China
2nd place, silver medalist(s)		Thomas Schmidberger; Thomas Brüchle; Jan Gürtler	Germany
3rd place, bronze medalist(s)		Jean-Philippe Robin; Florian Merrien	France

The men's team table tennis - Class 3 tournament at the 2012 Summer Paralympics in London is taking place from 5 September to 7 September 2012 at ExCeL Exhibition Centre. Classes 1-5 are for athletes with a physical impairment that affects their legs, and who compete in a sitting position. The lower the number, the greater the impact the impairment has on an athlete's ability to compete.

== Bracket ==
Quarter finals
South Korea (KOR)	3
Austria (AUT)	1
France (FRA)	3
Spain (ESP)	1
Argentina (ARG)	1
Germany (GER)	3

Semifinals
China (CHN)	3
South Korea (KOR)	0
France (FRA)	0
Germany (GER)	3

Gold medal
China (CHN)	3
Germany (GER)	2
Bronze medal
South Korea (KOR)	1
France (FRA)	3

== Results ==
=== Quarter-finals ===
5 September 2012; 16:30	South Korea	3–1	Austria

Report	Individual matches
Kim Jeong Seok	3–0	Egon Kramminger	11–6, 11–7, 11–7
Kim Jin-sung	3–0	Manfred Dollmann	13–11, 11–9, 11–7
Kim Jin-sung	1–3	Egon Kramminger	2–11, 11–8, 9–11, 7–11
Kim Jeong Seok	3–0	Manfred Dollmann	11–5, 11–5, 11–8

5 September 2012; 16:30	France	3–1	Spain

Report	Individual matches
Jean-Philippe Robin	2–3	Tomas Piñas	8–11, 11–9, 11–5, 7–11, 4–11
Florian Merrien	3–1	Miguel Rodríguez	12–10, 9–11, 11–3, 11–3
Florian Merrien	3–0	Tomas Piñas	11–8, 11–2, 14–12
Jean-Philippe Robin	3–1	Miguel Rodríguez	9–11, 11–4, 11–3, 11–4

5 September 2012; 16:30	Argentina	1–3	Germany

Report	Individual matches
Gabriel Copola	0–3	Thomas Brüchle	3–11, 9–11, 10–12
Fernando Eberhardt	0–3	Jan Gürtler	3–11, 1–11, 3–11
Gabriel Copola	3–2	Jan Gürtler	11–9, 9–11, 8–11, 11–3, 14–12
Fernando Eberhardt	0–3	Thomas Brüchle	2–11, 3–11, 3–11

=== Semi-finals ===
6 September 2012; 16:30	China	3–0	South Korea

Report	Individual matches
Feng Panfeng	3–0	Kim Jin-sung	11–9, 11–8, 11–7
Zhao Ping	3–1	Kim Jeong Seok	11–6, 11–13, 11–3, 11–6
Feng Panfeng	3–1	Kim Jeong Seok	11–7, 7–11, 11–1, 11–6

6 September 2012; 16:30	France	0–3	Germany

Report	Individual matches
Florian Merrien	2–3	Thomas Brüchle	11–5, 9–11, 10–12, 11–4, 4–11
Jean-Philippe Robin	0–3	Thomas Schmidberger	4–11, 9–11, 7–11
Florian Merrien	0–3	Thomas Schmidberger	3–11, 7–11, 7–11

=== Finals ===
Gold medal match

7 September 2012; 12:30	China	3–2	Germany

Report	Individual matches
Zhao Ping	1–3	Thomas Schmidberger	9–11, 4–11, 11–8, 5–11
Feng Panfeng	3–0	Thomas Brüchle	11–6, 11–1, 11–8
Feng Panfeng	3–1	Thomas Schmidberger	9–11, 11–9, 11–5, 11–9
Zhao Ping	1–3	Thomas Brüchle	9–11, 12–14, 11–8, 8–11
Zhao Ping / Feng Panfeng	3–1	Thomas Schmidberger / Thomas Brüchle	9–11, 11–8, 11–8, 11–8

Bronze medal match

7 September 2012; 12:30	South Korea	1–3	France

Report	Individual matches
Kim Jeong Seok	3–2	Jean-Philippe Robin	11–5, 8–11, 8–11, 11–7, 11–9
Kim Jin-sung	2–3	Florian Merrien	6–11, 11–7, 11–9, 6–11, 9–11
Kim Jeong Seok	0–3	Florian Merrien	8–11, 3–11, 4–11
Kim Jin-sung	1–3	Jean-Philippe Robin	12–10, 5–11, 9–11, 8–11
