= Table tennis at the 2024 Summer Paralympics – Mixed doubles XD7 =

Mixed doubles XD7 at the XVII Paralympic Games
- Venue: South Paris Arena 4, Paris
- Dates: 29 August – 1 September 2024
- Competitors: 40 from 15 nations
- Teams: 20

Medalists
1st place, gold medalist(s)		Feng Panfeng; Zhou Ying	China
2nd place, silver medalist(s)		Yuttajak Glinbancheun; Wijittra Jaion	Thailand
3rd place, bronze medalist(s)		Florian Merrien; Flora Vautier	France
3rd place, bronze medalist(s)		Zhai Xiang; Gu Xiaodan	China

The mixed doubles – Class 7 tournament at the 2024 Summer Paralympics in Paris will take place between 29 August and 1 September 2024 at South Paris Arena 4.

== Schedule ==
The schedule are as below:

P	Preliminary round	¼	Quarter-finals	½	Semi-finals	G	Gold medal match

Events	Dates							
Events	Thu 29 Aug		Fri 30 Aug		Sat 31 Aug		Sun 1 Sep	
Events	M	E	M	E	M	E	M	E
Mixed doubles XD7	P		¼		½		G	

== Results ==
=== Medal matches ===
Semi-finals
1	Feng PF (CHN); Zhou Y (CHN)	11	11	11
8	F Merrien (FRA); F Vautier (FRA)	4	9	8
3	Y Glinbancheun (THA); W Jaion (THA)	11	12	8	11
6	Zhai X (CHN); Gu XD (CHN)	9	10	11	7

Gold medal match
1	Feng PF (CHN); Zhou Y (CHN)	11	11	11	11
3	Y Glinbancheun (THA); W Jaion (THA)	13	7	9	8

=== Top half ===
==== Section 1 ====
Round of 32
9	B Trávníček (SVK); A Kánová (SVK)	11	11	11
19	K Ramadan (EGY); F Elshamy (EGY)	3	1	2

Round of 16
1	Feng PF (CHN); Zhou Y (CHN)	11	7	11	11
10	L Arabian (BRA); C Oliveira (BRA)	7	11	3	7
9	B Trávníček (SVK); A Kánová (SVK)	11	11	11
7	A Öztürk (TUR); H Duman (TUR)	8	9	8

Quarter-finals
1	Feng PF (CHN); Zhou Y (CHN)	11	10	11	11
9	B Trávníček (SVK); A Kánová (SVK)	6	12	9	8

==== Section 2 ====
Round of 32
20	C Addis (AUS); H Sands (AUS)	1	5	3
14	L Flores (CHI); T Leonelli (CHI)	11	11	11

Round of 16
8	F Merrien (FRA); F Vautier (FRA)	11	11	11
14	L Flores (CHI); T Leonelli (CHI)	2	7	1
V Baus (GER); J Spegel (GER)	6	8	11	7
4	Kim Y-g (KOR); Lee M-g (KOR)	11	11	9	11

Quarter-finals
8	F Merrien (FRA); F Vautier (FRA)	9	11	6	11	11
4	Kim Y-g (KOR); Lee M-g (KOR)	11	8	11	9	6

=== Bottom half ===
==== Section 3 ====
Round of 32
15	T Matthews (GBR); M Shackleton (GBR)	12	9	11	11
18	J Chen (AUS); D Di Toro (AUS)	10	11	7	5

Round of 16
3	Y Glinbancheun (THA); W Jaion (THA)	11	11	11
11	F Lamirault (FRA); A Saint-Pierre (FRA)	4	5	6
15	T Matthews (GBR); M Shackleton (GBR)	9	3	3
5	T Brüchle (GER); S Mikolaschek (GER)	11	11	11

Quarter-finals
3	Y Glinbancheun (THA); W Jaion (THA)	9	12	11	6	11
5	T Brüchle (GER); S Mikolaschek (GER)	11	10	6	11	7

==== Section 4 ====
Round of 32
17	R Czuper (POL); D Bucław (POL)	11	12	9	10	11
12	F Crosara (ITA); C Ragazzini (ITA)	9	10	11	12	8

Round of 16
6	Zhai X (CHN); Gu XD (CHN)	11	11	11
17	R Czuper (POL); D Bucław (POL)	9	5	9
16	E Romero (ARG); C Garrone (ARG)	8	9	3
2	Kim J-g (KOR); Yoon J-y (KOR)	11	11	11

Quarter-finals
6	Zhai X (CHN); Gu XD (CHN)	11	11	11
2	Kim J-g (KOR); Yoon J-y (KOR)	8	5	8
