= Luiz Algacir Silva =

Brazilian para table tennis player

Personal information
- Full name: Luiz Algacir Vergílio da Silva
- Born: 23 March 1973 Curitiba, Brazil
- Died: 23 January 2010 (aged 36) Curitiba, Brazil

Sport
- Country: Brazil
- Sport: Para table tennis
- Disability class: C3
Medal record
Para table tennis
Representing Brazil
Paralympic Games
Silver medal – second place	2008 Beijing	Men's teams C3
Parapan American Games
Gold medal – first place	1999 Mexico City	Men's teams C3
Gold medal – first place	2007 Rio de Janeiro	Men's singles C3
Gold medal – first place	2007 Rio de Janeiro	Men's teams C3
Para Pan-American Championships
Gold medal – first place	2001 Buenos Aires	Men's teams C3
Gold medal – first place	2003 Brasilia	Men's singles C3
Gold medal – first place	2003 Brasilia	Men's teams C3
Gold medal – first place	2005 Mar del Plata	Men's teams C1-3
Silver medal – second place	2001 Buenos Aires	Men's open singles wheelchair
Silver medal – second place	2001 Buenos Aires	Men's singles C3
Silver medal – second place	2003 Brasilia	Men's open singles wheelchair

Luis Algacir Vergílio da Silva (23 March 1973 – 23 January 2010) was a Brazilian para table tennis player. His highest rank was world number six in January 2005 in sports category 3 and has won his table tennis titles with Welder Knaf.

He died of cancer aged 36 in his hometown of Curitiba.
