= Table tennis at the 2016 Summer Paralympics – Men's team – Class 3 =

Table tennis at the XV Paralympic Games
- Venue: Riocentro Pavilion 3
- Dates: 14–16 September 2016
- Competitors: 8 teams from 8 nations

Medalists
1st place, gold medalist(s)		Zhao Ping; Feng Panfeng; Zhai Xiang	China
2nd place, silver medalist(s)		Thomas Schmidberger; Thomas Brüchle	Germany
3rd place, bronze medalist(s)		Yuttajak Glinbancheun; Anurak Laowong	Thailand

The Men's team table tennis – Class 3 tournament at the 2016 Summer Paralympics in Rio de Janeiro took place during 14–16 September 2016 at Riocentro Pavilion 3. Classes 1-5 were for athletes with a physical impairment that affected their legs, and who competed in a sitting position. The lower the number, the greater the impact the impairment was on an athlete’s ability to compete.

== Results ==
All times are local time in UTC-3.

=== Competition bracket ===
Quarterfinals
1	Germany (GER)	3	3
Sweden (SWE)	0	0
Brazil (BRA)	3	3
3	South Korea (KOR)	2	0
4	Poland (POL)	1	3	1
Thailand (THA)	3	2	3
Ukraine (UKR)	0	0
2	China (CHN)	3	3

Semifinals
1	Germany (GER)	3	3
Brazil (BRA)	0	1
Thailand (THA)	1	0
2	China (CHN)	3	3

Finals
1	Germany (GER)	3	0	2
2	China (CHN)	0	3	3
Bronze medal match
Brazil (BRA)	2	0
Thailand (THA)	3	3
