= Wanchai Chaiwut =

Thai para table tennis player (born 1989)

Personal information
- Nationality: Thai
- Born: 6 March 1989 (age 37) Nonthaburi, Thailand

Sport
- Sport: Para table tennis
- Disability class: C4
Medal record
Men's para table tennis
Representing Thailand
Paralympic Games
Silver medal – second place	2024 Paris	Singles C4
Bronze medal – third place	2024 Paris	Doubles MD8
World Championships
Silver medal – second place	2022 Granada	Doubles C8
Silver medal – second place	2022 Granada	Mixed doubles C8
Bronze medal – third place	2017 Bratislava	Teams C4
Asian Para Games
Gold medal – first place	2022 Hangzhou	Singles C4
Gold medal – first place	2022 Hangzhou	Doubles C8
Gold medal – first place	2018 Jakarta	Doubles C4–5
Silver medal – second place	2018 Jakarta	Mixed doubles C4–5
Silver medal – second place	2022 Hangzhou	Mixed doubles C7–10
Bronze medal – third place	2014 Incheon	Teams C4

Wanchai Chaiwut (born 6 March 1989) is a Thai para table tennis player.

== Career ==
Chaiwut represented Thailand at the 2022 Asian Para Games and won gold medals in the men's singles and doubles, and a silver medal in the mixed doubles event.

Chaiwut represented Thailand at the 2024 Summer Paralympics in the men's doubles MD8 event, along with Yuttajak Glinbancheun, and won a bronze medal.
