= Table tennis at the 2008 Summer Paralympics – Men's team – Class 3 =

Men's Team Class 3 at the XIII Paralympic Games
- Venue: Peking University Gymnasium
- Dates: 13 – 16 September 2008
- Competitors: 8

Medalists
1st place, gold medalist(s)		Yann Guilhem; Florian Merrien; Jean-Philippe Robin	France
2nd place, silver medalist(s)		Welder Knaf; Luiz Algacir Silva	Brazil
3rd place, bronze medalist(s)		Feng Panfeng; Gao Yanming; Zhao Ping	China

The Men's Team Class 3 table tennis competition at the 2008 Summer Paralympics was held between 13 September and 16 September at the Peking University Gymnasium. Classes 6–10 were for athletes with a physical impairment who competed from a standing position; the lower the number, the greater the impact the impairment had on an athlete's ability to compete.

The competition was a straight knock-out format. Each tie was decided by the best of a potential five matches, two singles, a doubles (not necessarily the same players) and two reverse singles.

The event was won by the team representing France.

== Competition bracket ==
Quarterfinals
France	3
Slovenia	0
Libya	0
Great Britain	3
Austria	0
Brazil	3
China	3
South Korea	1

Semifinals
France	3
Great Britain	0
Brazil	3
China	2

Final
France	3
Brazil	1
Third place
Great Britain	1
China	3

== Quarter-finals ==
13 September 2008; 16:30	Slovenia	0–3	France

Report	Individual matches
Ivan Lisac	0–3	Jean-Philippe Robin	4–11, 8–11, 9–11
Bojan Lukezic	2–3	Florian Merrien	3–11, 11–7, 11–8, 8–11, 10–12
Ivan Lisac / Bojan Lukezic	1–3	Florian Merrien / Yann Guilhem	4–11, 5–11, 11–7, 6–11

13 September 2008; 16:30	Great Britain	3–0	Libya

Report	Individual matches
Neil Robinson	3–0	Khaled Ahmed Abuajela	11–6, 11–8, 11–2
James Rawson	3–0	Ali Mabrouk Ahmed	11–0, 11–0, 11–1
Arnie Chan / James Rawson	3–0	Khaled Ahmed Abuajela / Ali Mabrouk Ahmed	11–2, 11–1, 11–4

13 September 2008; 16:30	Brazil	3–0	Austria

Report	Individual matches
Luiz Algacir Silva	3–1	Egon Kramminger	9–11, 11–6, 11–5, 11–2
Welder Knaf	3–0	Manfred Dollmann	11–5, 11–3, 11–7
Luiz Algacir Silva / Welder Knaf	3–2	Manfred Dollmann / Gunter Unger	11–6, 9–11, 11–4, 14–16, 11–4

13 September 2008; 16:30	China	3–1	South Korea

Report	Individual matches
Feng Panfeng	3–0	Kim Jeong-seok	11–2, 11–9, 11–7
Zhao Ping	0–3	Kim Young-gun	9–11, 4–11, 8–11
Feng Panfeng / Zhao Ping	3–2	Kim Jeong Seok / Kim Young Gun	11–7, 12–10, 8–11, 10–12, 11–4
Feng Panfeng	3–1	Kim Young-gun	11–9, 11–9, 8–11, 12–10

== Semi-finals ==
14 September 2008; 16:30	Great Britain	0–3	France

Report	Individual matches
Neil Robinson	1–3	Florian Merrien	9–11, 3–11, 11–9, 10–12
James Rawson	2–3	Jean-Philippe Robin	11–7, 9–11, 7–11, 11–8, 10–12
Neil Robinson / James Rawson	1–3	Jean-Philippe Robin / Florian Merrien	7–11, 13–11, 10–12, 10–12

14 September 2008; 16:30	China	2–3	Brazil

Report	Individual matches
Feng Panfeng	1–3	Welder Knaf	11–13, 7–11, 11–4, 12–14
Zhao Ping	3–1	Luiz Algacir Silva	8–11, 11–7, 11–7, 11–2
Feng Panfeng / Zhao Ping	2–3	Welder Knaf / Luiz Algacir Silva	13–15, 11–5, 11–4, 7–11, 6–11
Feng Panfeng	3–1	Luiz Algacir Silva	11–9, 11–3, 9–11, 11–2
Zhao Ping	1–3	Welder Knaf	9–11, 11–8, 10–12, 9–11

== Finals ==
Gold medal match

15 September 2008; 10:00	Brazil	1–3	France

Report	Individual matches
Luiz Algacir Silva	2–3	Jean-Philippe Robin	13–11, 4–11, 9–11, 11–4, 4–11
Welder Knaf	3–2	Florian Merrien	7–11, 14–12, 11–5, 9–11, 11–8
Luiz Algacir Silva / Welder Knaf	1–3	Jean-Philippe Robin / Florian Merrien	5–11, 5–11, 11–3, 4–11
Luiz Algacir Silva	0–3	Florian Merrien	5–11, 8–11, 3–11

Bronze medal match

15 September 2008; 10:00	China	3–1	Great Britain

Report	Individual matches
Feng Panfeng	3–2	Neil Robinson	14–16, 11–13, 11–7, 11–9, 11–5
Zhao Ping	2–3	James Rawson	7–11, 11–8, 5–11, 11–3, 4–11
Feng Panfeng / Zhao Ping	3–2	Neil Robinson / James Rawson	11–4, 7–11, 10–12, 11–9, 11–6
Feng Panfeng	3–0	James Rawson	11–8, 11–3, 11–9

== Team Lists ==
France; Yann Guilhem; Florian Merrien; Jean-Philippe Robin	Slovenia; Ivan Lisac; Bojan Lukezic	Libya; Ali Mabrouk Ahmed; Khaled Ahmed Abuajela	Great Britain; Neil Robinson; James Rawson; Arnie Chan
Austria; Gunter Unger; Manfred Dollmann; Egon Kramminger	Brazil; Welder Knaf; Luiz Algacir Silva	China; Feng Panfeng; Gao Yanming; Zhao Ping	South Korea; Kim Jeong Seok; Kim Young Gun
