= Gu Xiaodan =

Chinese para table tennis player

Personal information
- Born: 8 April 1999 (age 27) Pizhou, China

Sport
- Sport: Table tennis
Medal record
Women's para table tennis
Representing China
Paralympic Games
| Gold medal – first place | 2024 Paris | Doubles WD10 |
| Bronze medal – third place | 2020 Tokyo | Singles C4 |
| Bronze medal – third place | 2024 Paris | Singles C4 |
| Bronze medal – third place | 2024 Paris | Mixed doubles XD7 |
Asian Para Games
| Gold medal – first place | 2022 Hangzhou | Singles C4 |

Gu Xiaodan (born 8 April 1999) is a Chinese para table tennis player. She won one of the bronze medals in the women's individual C4 event at the 2020 Summer Paralympics held in Tokyo, Japan.
