= Feng Panfeng =

Chinese para table tennis player

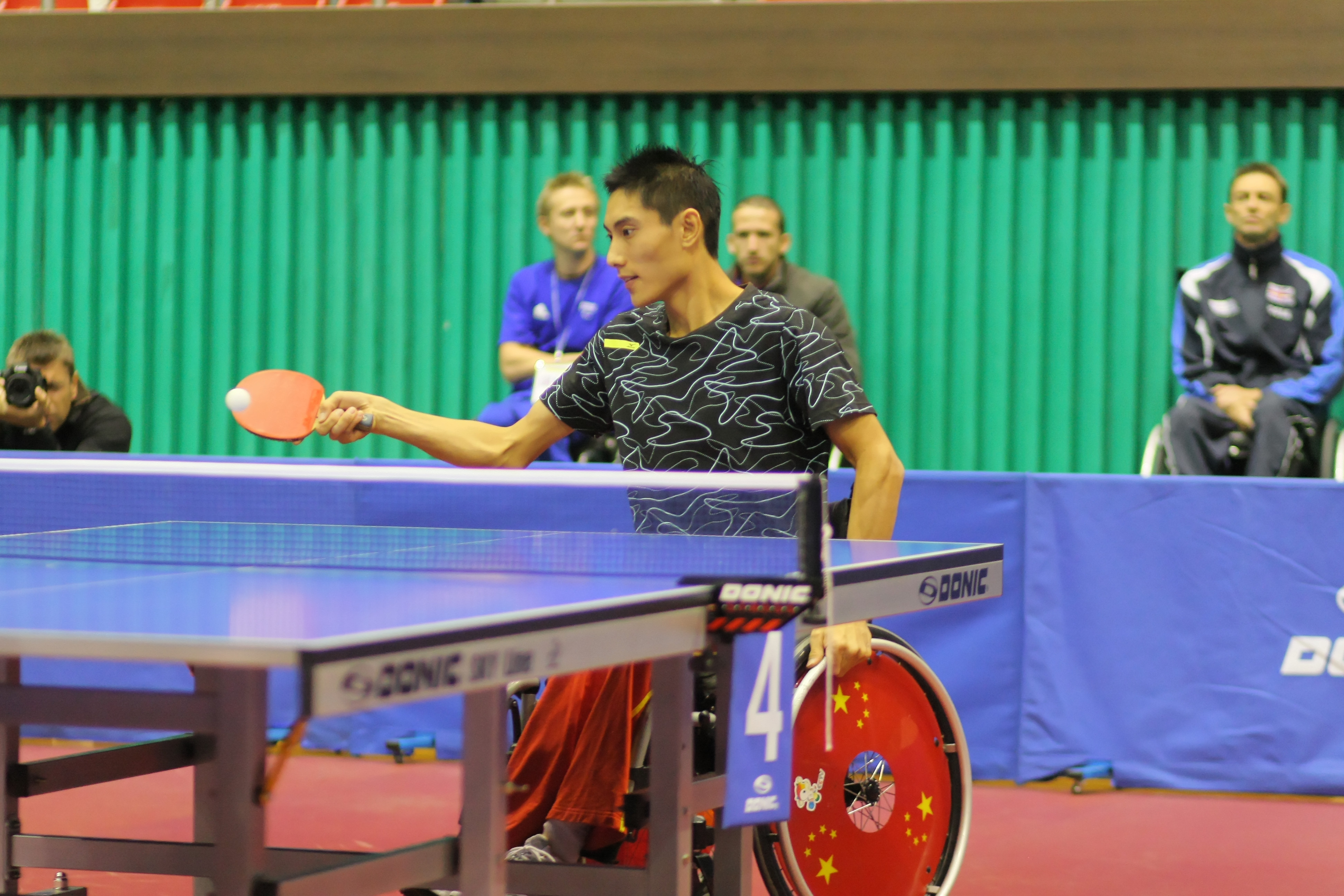
- Feng at the 2010 World Para Table Tennis Championships

Personal information
- Born: 20 December 1989 (age 36) Pizhou, Jiangsu, China
- Height: 177 cm (5 ft 10 in)
- Weight: 60 kg (132 lb)

Sport
- Sport: Table tennis
- Playing style: Right-handed shakehand grip
- Disability class: 3
- Highest ranking: 1 (July 2010)
- Current ranking: 1
Medal record
Men's para table tennis
Representing China
Paralympic Games
Gold medal – first place	2008 Beijing	Singles C3
Gold medal – first place	2012 London	Singles C3
Gold medal – first place	2012 London	Teams C3
Gold medal – first place	2016 Rio de Janeiro	Singles C3
Gold medal – first place	2016 Rio de Janeiro	Teams C3
Gold medal – first place	2020 Tokyo	Singles C3
Gold medal – first place	2020 Tokyo	Teams C3
Gold medal – first place	2024 Paris	Singles C3
Gold medal – first place	2024 Paris	Doubles MD8
Gold medal – first place	2024 Paris	Mixed doubles XD7
Bronze medal – third place	2008 Beijing	Teams C3
World Championships
Gold medal – first place	2010 Gwangju	Singles C3
Gold medal – first place	2014 Beijing	Singles C3
Gold medal – first place	2018 Lasko	Singles C3
Silver medal – second place	2014 Beijing	Teams C3
Asian Para Games
Gold medal – first place	2010 Guangzhou	Singles C1–3
Gold medal – first place	2010 Guangzhou	Teams C1–3
Gold medal – first place	2014 Incheon	Singles C3
Gold medal – first place	2014 Incheon	Teams C1–3
Gold medal – first place	2018 Jakarta	Singles C3
Gold medal – first place	2018 Jakarta	Teams C3
Gold medal – first place	2022 Hangzhou	Singles C3
FESPIC Games
Gold medal – first place	2006 Kuala Lumpur	Singles C3
Silver medal – second place	2006 Kuala Lumpur	Open singles standing
Silver medal – second place	2006 Kuala Lumpur	Teams C3
Asian Championships
Gold medal – first place	2005 Kuala Lumpur	Singles C3
Gold medal – first place	2007 Seoul	Teams C1–3
Gold medal – first place	2009 Amman	Singles C3
Gold medal – first place	2011 Hong Kong	Teams C3
Gold medal – first place	2013 Beijing	Singles C3
Gold medal – first place	2013 Beijing	Teams C3
Gold medal – first place	2015 Amman	Singles C3
Gold medal – first place	2015 Amman	Teams C3
Gold medal – first place	2017 Beijing	Singles C3
Gold medal – first place	2017 Beijing	Teams C3
Gold medal – first place	2019 Taichung	Singles C3
Gold medal – first place	2019 Taichung	Teams C3
Silver medal – second place	2005 Kuala Lumpur	Teams C3
Silver medal – second place	2007 Seoul	Singles C3
Silver medal – second place	2011 Hong Kong	Singles C3
FESPIC Championships
Silver medal – second place	2003 Shanghai	Singles C3
Silver medal – second place	2003 Shanghai	Singles C4

Feng Panfeng
- Traditional Chinese: 馮攀峰
- Simplified Chinese: 冯攀峰
Transcriptions
Standard Mandarin
- Hanyu Pinyin: Féng Pānfēng

Feng Panfeng (Chinese: 冯攀峰, born 20 December 1989) is a Chinese para table tennis player. He has won ten gold medals and one bronze medal from five Paralympic Games (2008, 2012, 2016, 2020 and 2024).

Like many of his teammates, Feng was a polio survivor from Pizhou who attended New Hope Center as a child. It was at New Hope Center where coach Heng Xin developed Feng into a professional table tennis player.

== Personal life ==
Feng Panfeng is married to his national teammate Gu Gai. They have a son together.
