= Thomas Schmidberger =

German para table tennis player

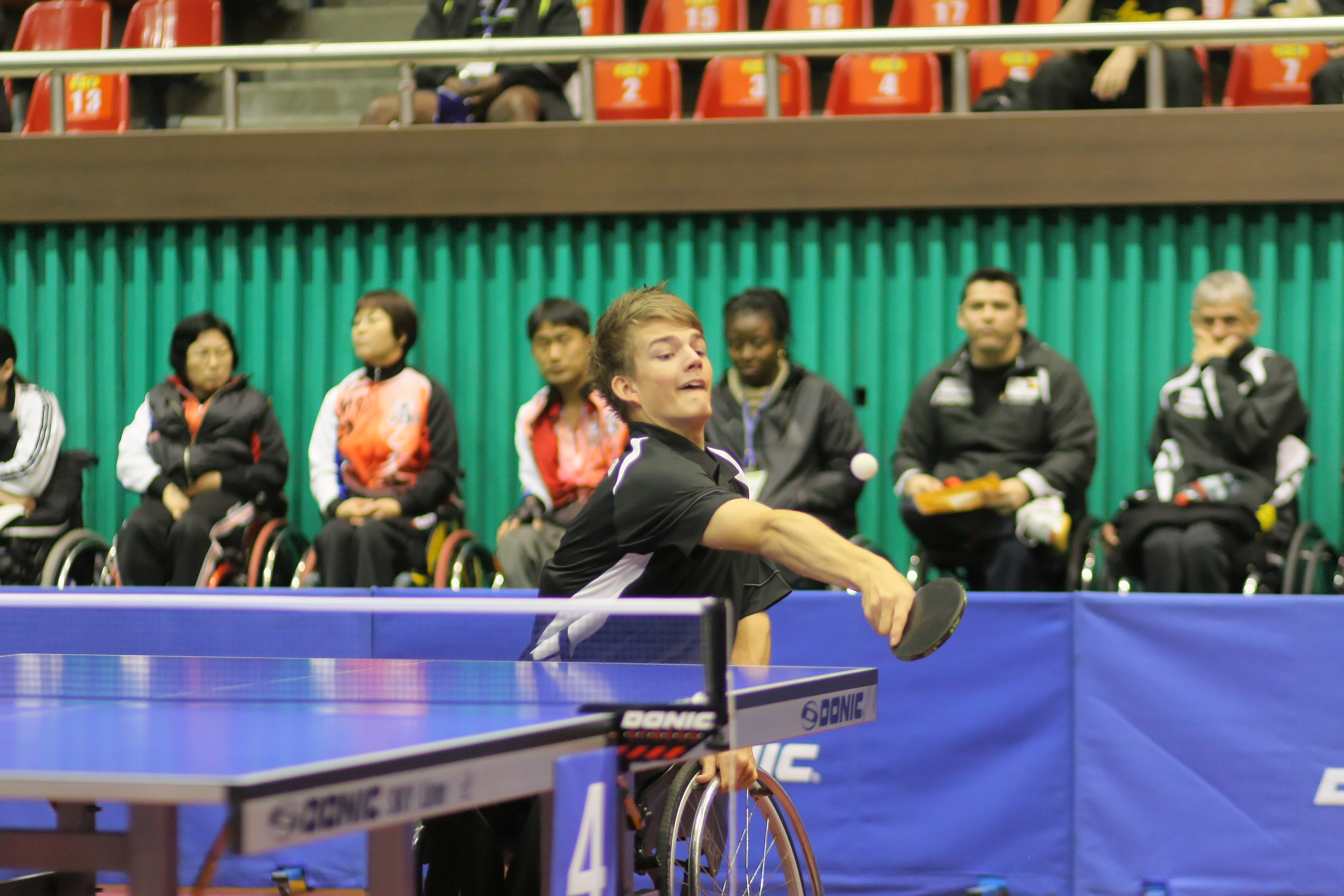
- Schmidberger in 2010

Personal information
- Nationality: German
- Born: 23 October 1991 (age 34) Zwiesel, Germany
- Height: 178 cm (5 ft 10 in)

Sport
- Country: Germany
- Sport: Para table tennis
- Disability: Spinal cord injury
- Disability class: C3
- Club: Borussia Dusseldorf
- Coached by: Micheld Comparato
Medal record
Para table tennis
Representing Germany
Paralympic Games
Silver medal – second place	2012 London	Team class 3
Silver medal – second place	2016 Rio de Janeiro	Singles class 3
Silver medal – second place	2016 Rio de Janeiro	Team class 3
Silver medal – second place	2020 Tokyo	Singles class 3
Silver medal – second place	2020 Tokyo	Team class 3
Silver medal – second place	2024 Paris	Singles class 3
Silver medal – second place	2024 Paris	Doubles MD8
Bronze medal – third place	2012 London	Singles class 3
World Championships
Gold medal – first place	2014 Beijing	Teams class 3
Silver medal – second place	2010 Gwangju	Singles class 3
Silver medal – second place	2014 Beijing	Singles class 3
Silver medal – second place	2018 Lasko-Celje	Singles class 3
World Team Championships
Gold medal – first place	2017 Bratislava	Teams class 3
European Championships
Gold medal – first place	2011 Split	Teams class 3
Gold medal – first place	2013 Lignano	Singles class 3
Gold medal – first place	2013 Lignano	Teams class 3
Gold medal – first place	2015 Vejle	Teams class 3
Gold medal – first place	2017 Lasko	Singles class 3
Gold medal – first place	2017 Lasko	Teams class 3
Silver medal – second place	2015 Vejle	Singles class 3
Bronze medal – third place	2011 Split	Singles class 3

Thomas Schmidberger (born 23 October 1991) is a German para table tennis player. He has won two world titles and six European titles in para table tennis tournaments.
