= Anurak Laowong =

Thai para table tennis player

Personal information
- Nickname: Peud
- Born: 21 January 1982 (age 44) Chanthaburi, Thailand
- Height: 160 cm (5 ft 3 in)
- Weight: 49 kg (108 lb)

Sport
- Sport: Table tennis
- Playing style: Right-handed shakehand grip
- Disability class: 3 (formerly 4)
- Highest ranking: 13 (December 2015)
- Current ranking: 15 (February 2020)
Medal record
Men's para table tennis
Representing Thailand
Paralympic Games
Bronze medal – third place	2016 Rio de Janeiro	Teams C3
Bronze medal – third place	2020 Tokyo	Teams C3
Asian Para Games
Gold medal – first place	2018 Jakarta	Men's doubles C2–3
Gold medal – first place	2018 Jakarta	Mixed doubles C2–3
Silver medal – second place	2014 Incheon	Teams C1–3
Bronze medal – third place	2010 Guangzhou	Teams C1–3
FESPIC Games
Bronze medal – third place	1999 Bangkok	Teams C4
Asian Championships
Silver medal – second place	2015 Amman	Teams C3
Silver medal – second place	2017 Beijing	Teams C3
Silver medal – second place	2019 Taichung	Teams C3
Bronze medal – third place	2015 Amman	Singles C3
ASEAN Para Games
Gold medal – first place	2017 Kuala Lumpur	Teams C1-3
Bronze medal – third place	2017 Kuala Lumpur	Singles C3

Anurak Laowong (Thai: อนุรักษ์ ลาววงษ์, RTGS: Anurak Lawuang, born 21 January 1982) is a Thai para table tennis player. He won a bronze medal at the 2016 Summer Paralympics.
