= Jenson Van Emburgh =

American para table tennis player

Personal information
- Born: 28 May 2000 (age 26) Naples, Florida, United States
- Home town: Belleair Beach, Florida, United States

Sport
- Country: United States
- Sport: Para table tennis
- Disability: Spinal cord injury
- Disability class: C3
- Coached by: Vlad Farcas
Medal record
Para table tennis
Representing United States
Paralympic Games
Bronze medal – third place	2020 Tokyo	Singles C3
Parapan American Games
Silver medal – second place	2019 Lima	Singles C3
Pan American Championships
Silver medal – second place	2017 San Jose	Singles C3
Silver medal – second place	2018 San Jose	Teams C4-5

Jenson Van Emburgh (born 28 May 2000) is an American para table tennis player who competes at international elite competitions. He is a Paralympic bronze medalist, Parapan American Games silver medalist and a double Pan-American silver medalist. He is the son of former tennis player and 1990 Wimbledon Championships semifinalist Greg Van Emburgh. Jenson was paralysed from the chest down following a spinal cord injury after birth.
