= Jean-Philippe Robin =

French para table tennis player

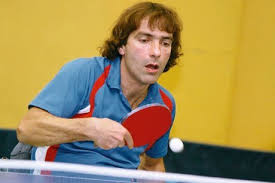

Personal information
- Born: 11 May 1967
- Died: 26 April 2015 (aged 47) Semussac, Charente-Maritime, France

Sport
- Country: France
- Sport: Para table tennis
- Disability: Paraplegic
- Disability class: C3
- Club: Club Rayon
Medal record
Men's para table tennis
Representing France
Paralympic Games
Gold medal – first place	2000 Sydney	Singles C3
Gold medal – first place	2000 Sydney	Teams C3
Gold medal – first place	2008 Beijing	Teams C3
Silver medal – second place	2004 Athens	Singles C3
Silver medal – second place	2008 Beijing	Singles C3
Bronze medal – third place	2004 Athens	Teams C3
Bronze medal – third place	2012 London	Teams C3
World Championships
Gold medal – first place	1998 Paris	Singles C3
Gold medal – first place	1998 Paris	Teams C3
Gold medal – first place	2002 Taipei	Singles C3
Gold medal – first place	2002 Taipei	Teams C3
Gold medal – first place	2006 Montreux	Teams C3
Gold medal – first place	2010 Gwangju	Teams C3
Silver medal – second place	1998 Paris	Open singles
European Championships
Gold medal – first place	1997 Stockholm	Singles C3
Gold medal – first place	1997 Stockholm	Teams C3
Gold medal – first place	1999 Piešťany	Doubles C1-5
Gold medal – first place	2001 Frankfurt	Singles C3
Gold medal – first place	2001 Frankfurt	Teams C3
Gold medal – first place	2007 Kranjska Gora	Open singles
Gold medal – first place	2007 Kranjska Gora	Teams C3
Gold medal – first place	2009 Genoa	Teams C3
Silver medal – second place	1999 Piešťany	Singles C3
Silver medal – second place	1999 Piešťany	Teams C3
Silver medal – second place	2001 Frankfurt	Singles
Silver medal – second place	2009 Genoa	Open singles
Silver medal – second place	2011 Split	Teams C3
Bronze medal – third place	2007 Kranjska Gora	Singles C3

Jean-Philippe Robin (11 May 1967 – 26 April 2015) was a French para table tennis player who won multiple European team titles with Pascal Verger and Michel Peeters. He died of heart problems at the age of 47.
