= Miguel Rodríguez (table tennis) =

Spanish table tennis player

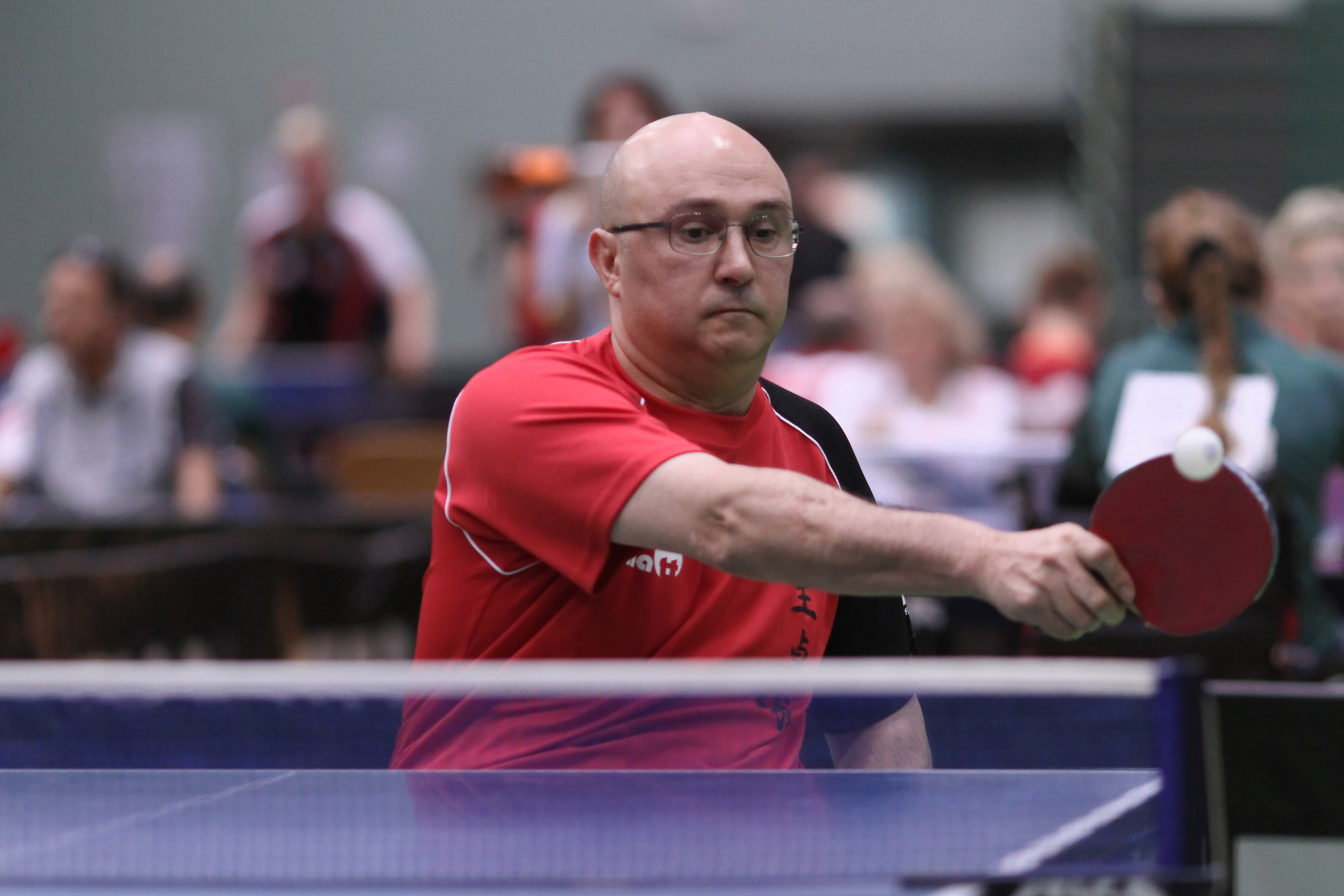

Personal information
- Full name: Miguel Rodríguez Martinez
- Nationality: Spanish
- Born: 17 September 1969 (age 56) Granada, Spain

Sport
- Country: Spain
- Sport: Table tennis

Miguel Rodríguez Martinez (Note: In this Spanish name, the first or paternal surname is Rodríguez and the second or maternal family name is Martinez.) (born 17 September 1969) is a Spanish table tennis player who competes in a wheelchair. He has been the Spanish national champion in the men's single championship in 2011, 2012 and 2012, and has been internationally ranked. He has represented Spain at the 2012 Summer Paralympics.

== Personal ==
Rodríguez is from Grenada, and uses a wheelchair.

== Table tennis ==
Rodríguez is a member of CTM Caja Granada, and is a class 3 table tennis player who competes sitting in a wheelchair. For international competitions, he is affiliated with the Royal Spanish Table Tennis Federation.

In 2009, Rodríguez was internationally ranked, one of only five Spanish players to be ranked at the time. The 2009 European Championships were held at the Vaillant Palace in Genoa, Italy. He was part of the twelve member Spanish delegation, and one of six Spanish competitors using a wheelchair. At the 2011 Spanish national disability table tennis championship, he earned a gold medal. It was the first time the event had been organized by the Spanish Table Tennis Federation. In the final match, he beat Manuel Robles 3 sets to 2 with individual match scores of 5-11, 11-8, 11-6, 9-11 and 11-8.

Rodríguez competed at the 2012 Spanish national disability table tennis championships, which for the third time was affiliated with the Royal Spanish Table Tennis Federation. He repeated his performance from 2011 and won a gold medal in the men's single wheelchair group. Competing at the 2012 Summer Paralympics, he earned a Paralympic diploma, after having been eliminated by a French competitor. Prior to going to London, he participated in an international competition in Slovenia, and then went to a national team training camp at High Performance Centre (CAR) in Madrid. In February 2013, he competed at the Spanish national disability table tennis championships where he earned a medal. In May 2013, he participated in the Bratislava hosted Slovak Open, one of six members of the Spanish delegation to compete at the event.
