= Welder Knaf =

Brazilian para table tennis player

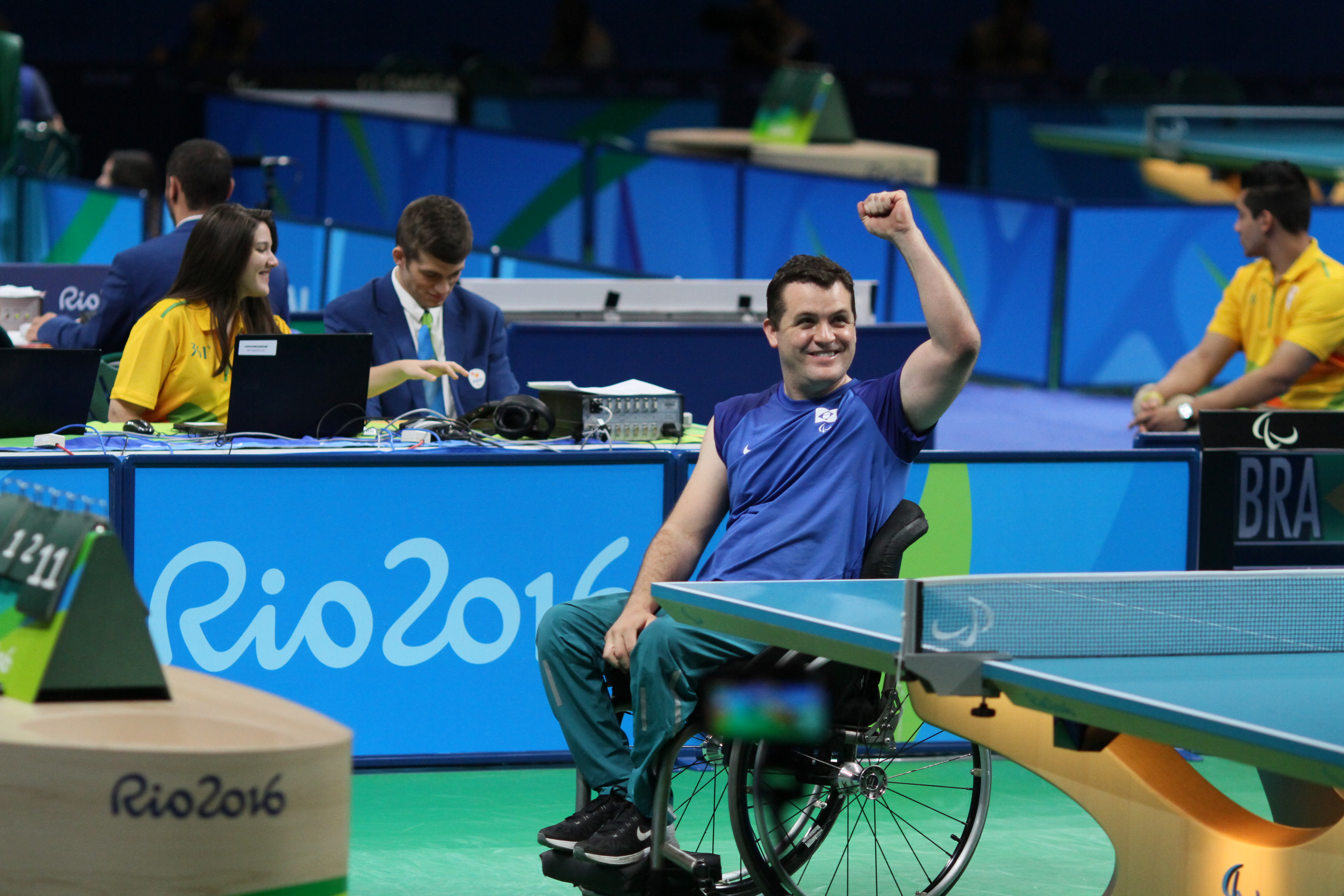
- Knaf at the 2016 Summer Paralympics

Personal information
- Full name: Welder Camargo Knaf
- Born: 6 April 1981 (age 45) Guarapuava, Brazil
- Height: 1.70 m (5 ft 7 in)

Sport
- Country: Brazil
- Sport: Para table tennis
- Disability: Paraplegia
- Disability class: C3
Medal record
Para table tennis
Representing Brazil
Paralympic Games
Silver medal – second place	2008 Beijing	Men's teams C3
Parapan American Games
Gold medal – first place	2007 Rio de Janeiro	Men's teams C3
Gold medal – first place	2011 Guadalajara	Men's teams C1-3
Gold medal – first place	2015 Toronto	Men's teams C3-4
Silver medal – second place	2007 Rio de Janeiro	Men's singles C3
Silver medal – second place	2015 Toronto	Men's singles C3
Silver medal – second place	2019 Lima	Men's teams C3-5
Bronze medal – third place	2011 Guadalajara	Men's singles C3
Bronze medal – third place	2019 Lima	Men's singles C3
Pan American Championships
Gold medal – first place	2003 Brasilia	Men's teams C3
Gold medal – first place	2005 Mar del Plata	Men's teams C1-3
Gold medal – first place	2009 Margarita Island	Men's singles C3
Silver medal – second place	2009 Margarita Island	Men's teams C3
Silver medal – second place	2009 Margarita Island	Men's open singles
Bronze medal – third place	2005 Mar del Plata	Men's singles C3

Welder Camargo Knaf (born 6 April 1981) is a Brazilian para table tennis player who competes in international level events. He is a triple Parapan American Games champion, triple Pan American champion and a Paralympic silver medalist at the 2008 Summer Paralympics with Luiz Algacir Silva.
