= Zhao Ping =

Chinese para table tennis player

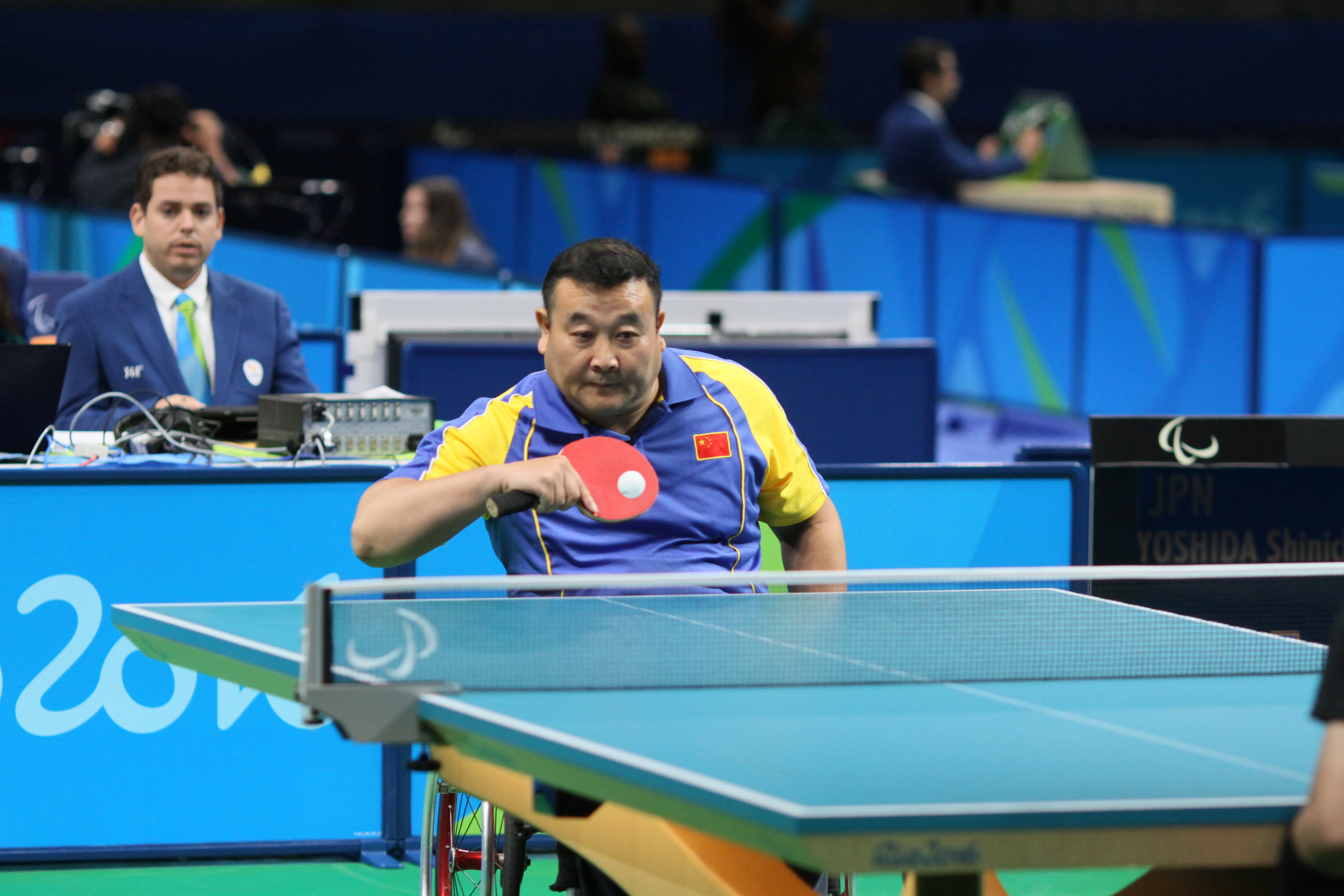
- Zhao at the 2016 Summer Paralympics

Personal information
- Born: March 31, 1965 (age 61) Qiqihar, Heilongjiang, China
- Height: 182 cm (6 ft 0 in)
- Weight: 80 kg (176 lb)

Sport
- Sport: Table tennis
- Playing style: Right-handed shakehand grip
- Disability class: 3
- Highest ranking: 3 (January 2012)
- Current ranking: 7 (February 2020)
Medal record
Men's para table tennis
Representing China
Paralympic Games
Gold medal – first place	2012 London	Teams C3
Gold medal – first place	2016 Rio de Janeiro	Teams C3
Bronze medal – third place	2008 Beijing	Teams C3
World Championships
Silver medal – second place	2014 Beijing	Teams C3
Asian Para Games
Gold medal – first place	2010 Guangzhou	Teams C1–3
FESPIC Games
Silver medal – second place	2006 Kuala Lumpur	Teams C3
Bronze medal – third place	2006 Kuala Lumpur	Singles C3
Asian Championships
Gold medal – first place	2007 Seoul	Singles C3
Gold medal – first place	2007 Seoul	Teams C1–3
Gold medal – first place	2011 Hong Kong	Singles C3
Gold medal – first place	2011 Hong Kong	Teams C3
Gold medal – first place	2013 Beijing	Teams C3
Gold medal – first place	2015 Amman	Teams C3
Gold medal – first place	2017 Beijing	Teams C3
Gold medal – first place	2019 Taichung	Teams C3
Silver medal – second place	2013 Beijing	Singles C3
Silver medal – second place	2015 Amman	Singles C3
Silver medal – second place	2017 Beijing	Singles C3

Zhao Ping
- Traditional Chinese: 趙平
- Simplified Chinese: 赵平
Transcriptions
Standard Mandarin
- Hanyu Pinyin: Zhào Píng

Zhao Ping (Chinese: 赵平, born 31 March 1965) is a Chinese para table tennis player. He won three medals at the 2008, 2012, and 2016 Summer Paralympics respectively.

Zhao has been paralyzed since 1999, when he was involved in a car accident.
