= Florian Merrien =

French para table tennis player

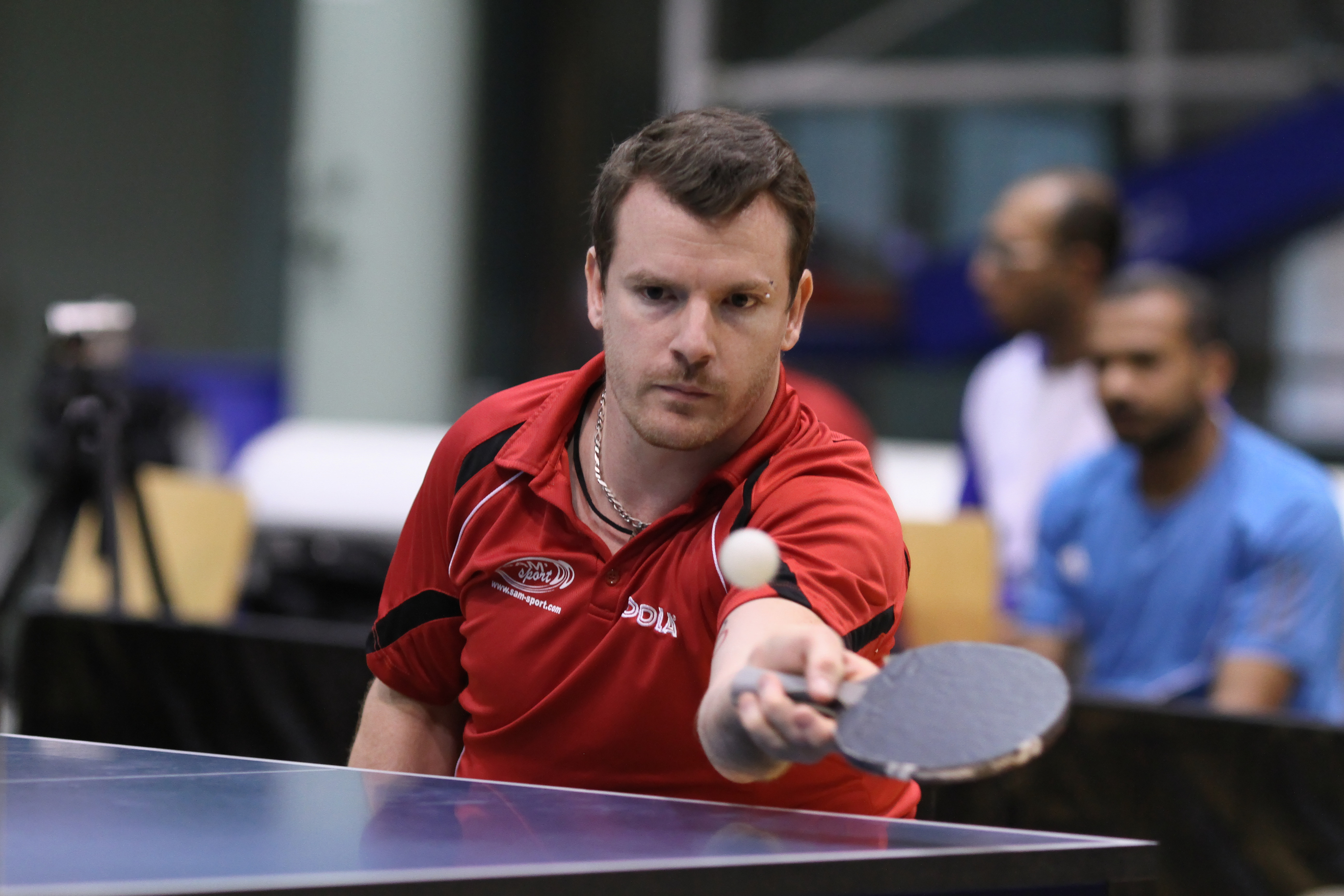
- Merrien in 2014

Personal information
- Nickname: Chick
- Born: 21 November 1984 (age 41) Mont-Saint-Aignan, France
- Height: 165 cm (5 ft 5 in)

Sport
- Country: France
- Sport: Para table tennis
- Disability: Spinal cord injury
- Disability class: C3
- Coached by: Jérôme Humbert
Medal record
Para table tennis
Representing France
Paralympic Games
Gold medal – first place	2008 Beijing	Men's teams C3
Bronze medal – third place	2012 London	Men's teams C3
Bronze medal – third place	2016 Rio de Janeiro	Men's singles C3
Bronze medal – third place	2024 Paris	Mixed doubles XD7
World Championships
Gold medal – first place	2006 Montreux	Men's teams C3
Gold medal – first place	2010 Gwangju	Men's teams C3
Bronze medal – third place	2014 Beijing	Men's singles C3
Bronze medal – third place	2014 Beijing	Men's teams C5
World Team Championships
Silver medal – second place	2017 Bratislava	Men's teams C4
European Championships
Gold medal – first place	2005 Jesolo	Men's singles C3
Gold medal – first place	2007 Kranjska Gora	Men's singles C3
Gold medal – first place	2007 Kranjska Gora	Men's teams C3
Gold medal – first place	2009 Genoa	Men's singles C3
Gold medal – first place	2009 Genoa	Men's teams C3
Gold medal – first place	2013 Lignano	Men's teams C5
Silver medal – second place	2011 Split	Men's teams C3
Silver medal – second place	2015 Vejle	Men's teams C5
Silver medal – second place	2017 Lasko	Men's singles C3
Silver medal – second place	2017 Lasko	Men's teams C4
Silver medal – second place	2019 Helsingborg	Men's singles C3
Silver medal – second place	2019 Helsingborg	Men's teams C3
Bronze medal – third place	2005 Jesolo	Men's teams C3
Bronze medal – third place	2007 Kranjska Gora	Open singles wheelchair
Bronze medal – third place	2013 Lignano	Men's singles C3
Bronze medal – third place	2015 Vejle	Men's singles C3

Florian Merrien (born 21 November 1984) is a French para table tennis player who is a double World champion, six time European champion, 20-time French national champion and triple Paralympic medalist. He has won team titles with Nicolas Savant-Aira, Gregory Rosec and Jean-Philippe Robin. He was paralysed aged 18 months after contracting a virus that affected his spinal cord.
