= Yuttajak Glinbancheun =

Thai para table tennis player (born 1996)

Personal information
- Nickname: Tie
- Born: 20 December 1996 (age 29) Suphan Buri, Thailand
- Height: 155 cm (5 ft 1 in)
- Weight: 49 kg (108 lb)

Sport
- Sport: Table tennis
- Playing style: Right-handed shakehand grip
- Disability class: 3
- Highest ranking: 8 (September 2019)
- Current ranking: 8
Medal record
Men's para table tennis
Representing Thailand
Paralympic Games
Silver medal – second place	2024 Paris	Mixed doubles XD7
Bronze medal – third place	2016 Rio de Janeiro	Teams C3
Bronze medal – third place	2020 Tokyo	Teams C3
Bronze medal – third place	2024 Paris	Singles C3
Bronze medal – third place	2024 Paris	Doubles MD8
Asian Para Games
Gold medal – first place	2018 Jakarta	Doubles C2–3
Gold medal – first place	2022 Hangzhou	Doubles MD8
Silver medal – second place	2018 Jakarta	Singles C3
Asian Championships
Silver medal – second place	2015 Amman	Teams C3
Silver medal – second place	2017 Beijing	Teams C3
Silver medal – second place	2019 Taichung	Teams C3
Bronze medal – third place	2015 Amman	Singles C3
Bronze medal – third place	2017 Beijing	Singles C3
Bronze medal – third place	2019 Taichung	Singles C3

Yuttajak Glinbancheun (Thai: ยุทธจักร กลิ่นบานชื่น, RTGS: Yutthachak Klinbanchuen, born 20 December 1996) is a Thai para table tennis player. He won a bronze medal at the 2016 Summer Paralympics.
