= Thomas Brüchle =

German para table tennis player

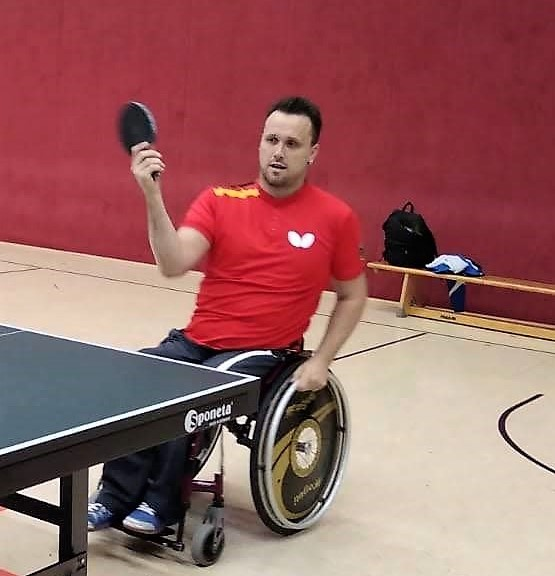

Personal information
- Full name: Thomas Oliver Brüchle
- Nickname: The Wall
- Born: 29 July 1976 (age 49) Lindau, Germany

Sport
- Country: Germany
- Sport: Para table tennis
- Disability: Paraplegia
- Disability class: C3
- Club: SV Salamander Kornwesthaim
Medal record
Para table tennis
Representing Germany
Paralympic Games
| Silver medal – second place | 2012 London | Men's team C3 |
| Silver medal – second place | 2016 Rio de Janeiro | Men's team C3 |
| Silver medal – second place | 2020 Tokyo | Men's team class 3 |
World Championships
| Gold medal – first place | 2014 Beijing | Men's team C3 |
| Bronze medal – third place | 2018 Lasko | Men's singles C3 |
World Team Championships
| Gold medal – first place | 2017 Bratislava | Men's teams C3 |
European Championships
| Gold medal – first place | 2011 Split | Men's teams C3 |
| Gold medal – first place | 2013 Lignano | Men's teams C3 |
| Gold medal – first place | 2015 Vejle | Men's singles C3 |
| Gold medal – first place | 2015 Vejle | Men's teams C3 |
| Gold medal – first place | 2017 Lasko | Men's teams C3 |
| Gold medal – first place | 2019 Helsingborg | Men's teams C3 |
| Silver medal – second place | 2011 Split | Men's singles C3 |
| Bronze medal – third place | 2013 Lignano | Men's singles C3 |
| Bronze medal – third place | 2017 Lasko | Men's singles C3 |
| Bronze medal – third place | 2019 Helsingborg | Men's singles C3 |

Thomas Oliver Brüchle (transliterated Bruechle, born 29 July 1976) is a German para table tennis player who participates in international level events. He is a multiple European medalist, double World champion and double Paralympic silver medalist. He competes mainly in team events along with Thomas Schmidberger, they both share the same team titles.
