= Zhai Xiang =

Chinese para table tennis player

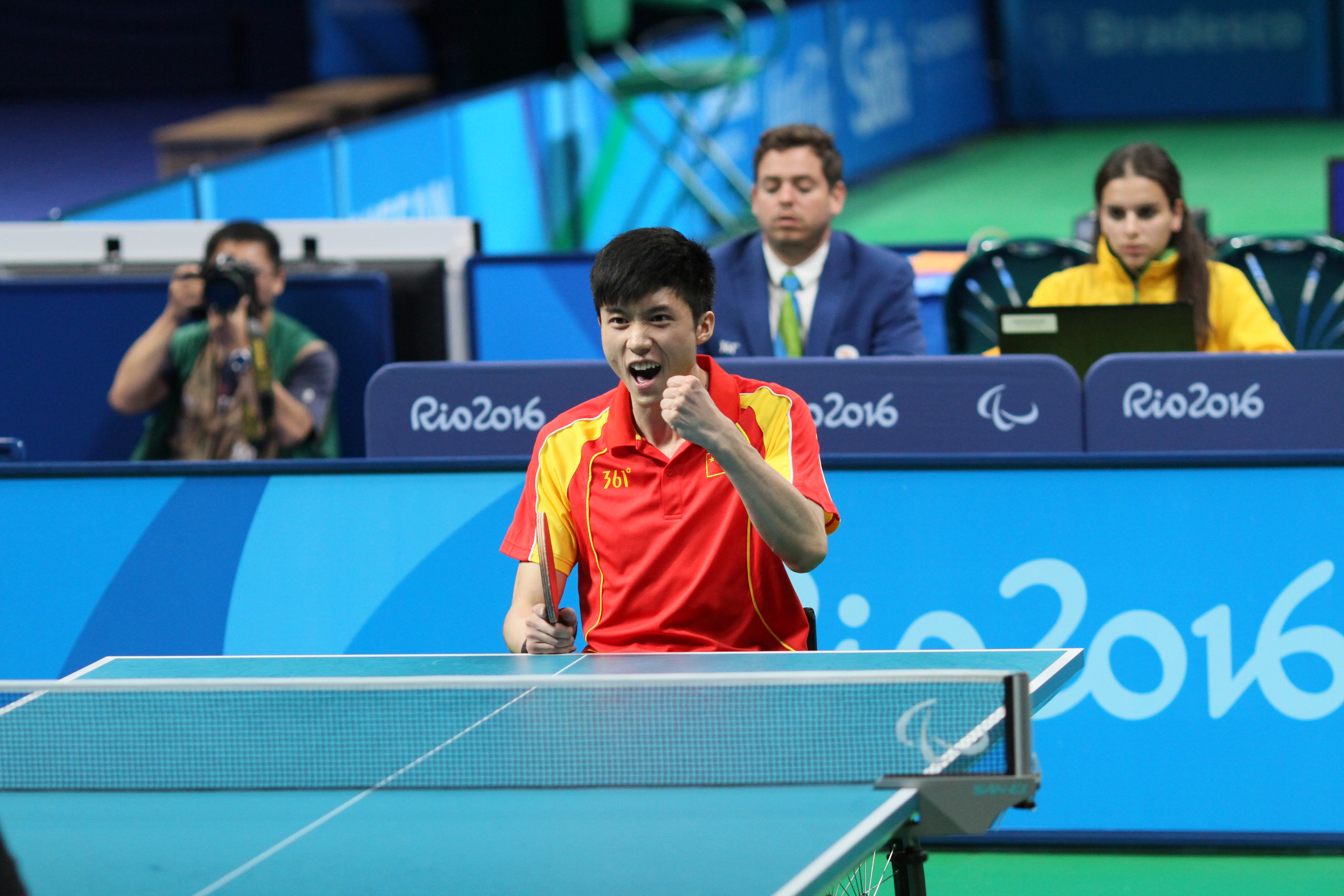
- Zhai at the 2016 Summer Paralympics

Personal information
- Born: December 3, 1992 (age 33) Baoji, Shaanxi, China
- Height: 160 cm (5 ft 3 in)
- Weight: 45 kg (99 lb)

Sport
- Sport: Table tennis
- Playing style: Right-handed shakehand grip
- Disability class: 3
- Highest ranking: 5 (April 2019)
- Current ranking: 6 (February 2020)
Medal record
Men's para table tennis
Representing China
Paralympic Games
Gold medal – first place	2016 Rio de Janeiro	Teams C3
Bronze medal – third place	2024 Paris	Doubles XD7
World Championships
Silver medal – second place	2014 Beijing	Teams C3
Bronze medal – third place	2018 Laško	Singles C3
Asian Para Games
Gold medal – first place	2014 Incheon	Teams C3
Bronze medal – third place	2014 Incheon	Singles C3
Bronze medal – third place	2022 Hangzhou	Singles C3
Asian Championships
Gold medal – first place	2013 Beijing	Teams C3
Gold medal – first place	2015 Amman	Teams C3
Gold medal – first place	2017 Beijing	Teams C3
Gold medal – first place	2019 Taichung	Teams C3
Silver medal – second place	2019 Taichung	Singles C3
Bronze medal – third place	2013 Beijing	Singles C3
Bronze medal – third place	2017 Beijing	Singles C3

Zhai Xiang (Chinese: 翟祥; pinyin: Zhái Xiáng, born 3 December 1992) is a Chinese para table tennis player. He won a gold medal at the 2016 Summer Paralympics.

== Personal life ==
Zhai's disability is due to a neural tube defect.
