= Gabriel Copola =

Argentine para table tennis player

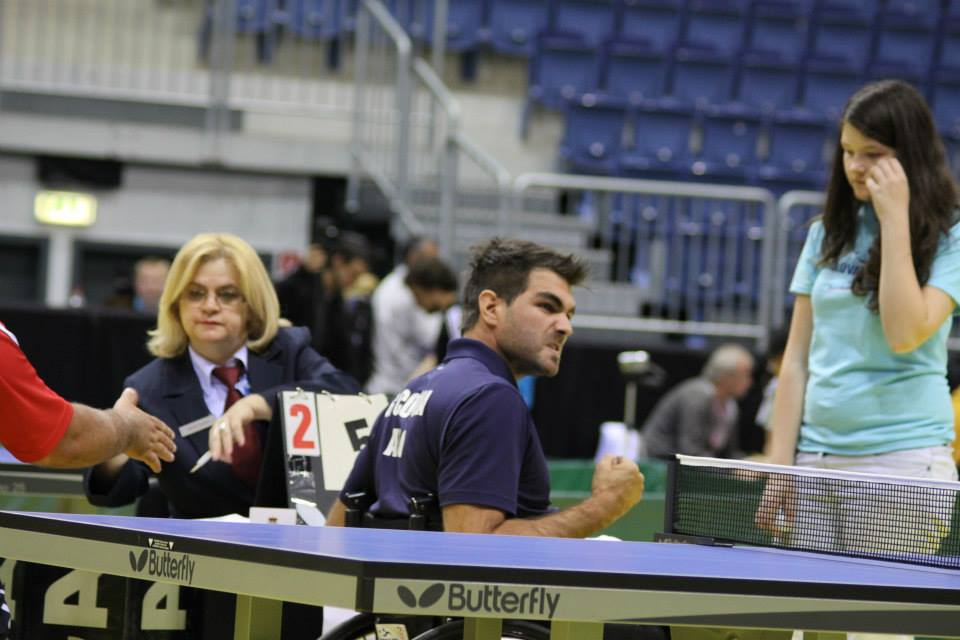

Personal information
- Full name: Gabriel Emiliano Copola
- Nickname: Gaby
- Nationality: Argentina
- Born: 20 January 1984 (age 42) Ituzaingo, Argentina
- Height: 1.83 m (6 ft 0 in)
- Weight: 74 kg (163 lb; 11.7 st)

Sport
- Sport: Table tennis
- Club: MdO, Buenos Aires, Argentina
- Playing style: Shakehand, Offensive
Medal record
Men's table tennis
Representing Argentina
Parapan American Games
Gold medal – first place	2011 Guadalajara	Men's singles C3
Gold medal – first place	2011 Guadalajara	Men's teams C4-5
Gold medal – first place	2019 Lima	Singles C3
Silver medal – second place	2015 Toronto	Singles C3
Bronze medal – third place	2015 Toronto	Teams C5
Bronze medal – third place	2019 Lima	Teams C3-5
Bronze medal – third place	2023 Santiago	Singles C3
Bronze medal – third place	2023 Santiago	Mixed doubles XD10
Para Panamerican Championships
Gold medal – first place	2009 Margarita Island	Men's Team Class 5
Silver medal – second place	2005 Mar del Plata	Men's Open Wheelchair
Silver medal – second place	2005 Mar del Plata	Men's Team Class 3
Silver medal – second place	2003 Brasilia	Men's Team Class 3
Silver medal – second place	2001 Buenos Aires	Men's Team Class 3

Gabriel Emiliano Copola (born 20 January 1984) is an Argentine para table tennis player with competition Classification 3. He plays for MdO (colonia Montes de Oca) in Buenos Aires, Buenos Aires. Copola's current ranking is world number 11 in class 3, his highest ranking was world number 5 in February 2016.

== Career ==
A lover of sports, Copola had a bicycle accident when he was 11, which left him paraplegic. He began playing table tennis in 1999 and made his international debut the same year, representing Argentina at the 2011 Parapan American Games in Mexico, where he won the gold medal in the Men's singles C3 competition and thus qualified for the London 2012 Paralympic Games.

== Career Record ==
=== Parapan American Games ===
(gold) 2011 Guadalajara: Men's Singles Class 3
(gold) 2011 Guadalajara: Men's Team Class 5

=== Para Panamerican Championships ===
(gold) 2009 Margarita Island: Men's Team Class 5
(silver) 2005 Mar del Plata: Men's Team Class 3
(silver) 2005 Mar del Plata: Men's Wheelchair Open
(silver) 2003 Brasília: Men's Team
(silver) 2001 Buenos Aires: Men's Team
