= South Korea at the 2024 Summer Paralympics =

- IPC code: KOR
- NPC: Korea Paralympic Committee
- Website: www.koreanpc.kr (in Korean)

in Paris, France August 28, 2024 – September 8, 2024
- Competitors: 83 in 17 sports
- Flag bearer: Choi Yong-beom
- Medals Ranked 22nd: Gold 6 Silver 10 Bronze 1‌4 Total

Summer Paralympics appearances (overview)
- 1968; 1972; 1976; 1980; 1984; 1988; 1992; 1996; 2000; 2004; 2008; 2012; 2016; 2020; 2024

South Korea competed at the 2024 Summer Paralympics in Paris, France, from 28 August to 8 September.

== Medalists ==
Medal	Name	Sport	Event	Date#
Gold	Jo Jeong-du	Shooting	P1 Men's 10 metre air pistol SH1	30 August
Gold	Park Jin-ho	Shooting	R1 Men's 10 metre air rifle standing SH1	31 August
Gold	Jeong Ho-won	Boccia	Men's individual BC3	2 September
Gold	Park Jin-ho	Shooting	R7 Men's 50 metre rifle 3 positions SH1	3 September
Gold	Kim Gi-tae	Table tennis	Men's singles MS11	5 September
Gold	Kim Young-gun	Table tennis	Men's singles MS4	7 September
Silver	Lee Yun-ri	Shooting	R2 Women's 10 metre air rifle standing SH1	30 August
Silver	Seo Su-yeon; Yoon Ji-yu	Table tennis	Women's doubles WD5	30 August
Silver	Jang Yeong-jin; Park Sung-joo	Table tennis	Men's doubles MD4	31 August
Silver	Jeong So-yeong	Boccia	Women's individual BC2	1 September
Silver	Jeong Jae-gun; Yu Soo-young	Badminton	Men's doubles WH1–WH2	1 September
Silver	Jung Sung-joon	Boccia	Men's individual BC1	2 September
Silver	Choi Jung-man	Badminton	Men's singles WH1	2 September
Silver	Jeong Ho-won; Kang Sun-hee	Boccia	Pairs BC3	5 September
Silver	Yoon Ji-yu	Table tennis	Women's singles WS3	6 September
Silver	Kwon Hyo-kyeong	Wheelchair fencing	Women's épée A	6 September
Bronze	Seo Hun-tae	Shooting	R4 Mixed 10 metre air rifle standing SH2	30 August
Bronze	Cha Soo-yong; Park Jin-cheol	Table tennis	Men's doubles MD4	30 August
Bronze	Jung Young-a; Moon Sung-hye	Table tennis	Women's doubles WD10	31 August
Bronze	Kang Oe-jeong; Lee Mi-gyu	Table tennis	Women's doubles WD10	31 August
Bronze	Joo Jeong-hun	Taekwondo	Men's 80 kg	31 August
Bronze	Kang Sun-hee	Boccia	Women's individual BC3	1 September
Bronze	Kim Jung-nam	Shooting	P3 Mixed 25 metre pistol SH1	2 September
Bronze	Kim Jung-jun	Badminton	Men's singles WH2	2 September
Bronze	Jung Young-a	Table tennis	Women's singles WS5	4 September
Bronze	Moon Sung-hye	Table tennis	Women's singles WS5	4 September
Bronze	Cha Soo-yong	Table tennis	Men's singles MS2	4 September
Bronze	Jang Yeong-jin	Table tennis	Men's singles MS3	5 September
Bronze	Seo Su-yeon	Table tennis	Women's singles WS1–2	5 September
Bronze	Kim Jung-gil	Table tennis	Men's singles MS4	7 September

== Competitors ==
The following is the list of number of competitors in the Games.

Sport	Men	Women	Total
Archery	2	3	5
Athletics	1	0	1
Badminton	4	2	6
Boccia	2	2	5
Goalball	0	6	6
Paracanoeing	1	0	1
Rowing	0	1	1
Shooting	2	3	12
Swimming	5	1	6
Table tennis	9	6	15
Taekwondo	2	0	2
Total	46	37	83

== Archery ==
South Korea entered five athletes into the games by virtue of their result at the 2023 World Para Archery Championships in Plzeň, Czech Republic and 2023 Asian Championships in Bangkok, Thailand.

Men

Athlete	Event	Ranking Round		Round of 32	Round of 16	Quarterfinals	Semifinals	Finals/BM	
Athlete	Event	Score	Seed	Opposition Score	Opposition Score	Opposition Score	Opposition Score	Opposition Score	Rank
Park Hong Jo	Individual W1	613	12	—N/a	Han (CHN); L 140–130	Did not advance			11
Kwak Geonhwi	Individual recurve	647	2	Bye	Papağan (TUR); W 6–2	Kenton-Smith (AUS); L 4–6	Did not advance		5

Women

Athlete	Event	Ranking Round		Round of 32	Round of 16	Quarterfinals	Semifinals	Finals/BM	
Athlete	Event	Score	Seed	Opposition Score	Opposition Score	Opposition Score	Opposition Score	Opposition Score	Rank
Kim Ok-geum	Individual W1	623	3	—N/a	Bye	Kingstone (GBR); W 128-122	Chen (CHN); L 123–132	Brandtlová (CZE); L 122–127	4
Choi Nami	Individual compound	661	18	Zúñiga (CHI); L135-139	Did not advance				17
Jeong Jinyoung	Individual compound	659	19	Lin (CHN); L134-140	Did not advance				17
Jang Gyeong Suk	Individual recurve	510	20	Pattawaeo (THA); L 0–6	Did not advance				23

Mixed

Athlete	Event	Ranking Round		Round of 16	Quarterfinals	Semifinals	Finals/BM	
Athlete	Event	Score	Seed	Opposition Score	Opposition Score	Opposition Score	Opposition Score	Rank
Park Hong Jo; Kim Ok-geum	Team W1	1236	4	—N/a	Hekimoğlu / Mısır (TUR); W 134–132	Tianxin / Minyi (CHN); L 139–145	Tonon / Dameno (ITA); L 132–134	4
Jang Gyeong Suk; Kwak Geonhwi	Team recurve	—N/a		Rahimi / Arab Ameri (IRI); L 4–5	Did not advance			9

== Athletics ==
South Korean track and field athletes achieved quota places for the following events based on their results at the 2023 World Championships, 2024 World Championships, or through high performance allocation, as long as they meet the minimum entry standard (MES).

Key

- Note–Ranks given for track events are within the athlete's heat only
- Q = Qualified for the next round
- q = Qualified for the next round as a fastest loser or, in field events, by position without achieving the qualifying target
- DQ = Disqualified
- PR = Paralympic Record
- AR = Area (or continental) Record
- NR = National Record
- SB = Season's Best
- N/A = Round not applicable for the event
- Bye = Athlete not required to compete in round

Track & road events

Athlete	Event	Heat		Final	
Athlete	Event	Result	Rank	Result	Rank
Yoo Byung-hoon	Men's 100 m T53	15.94	4 q	15.92	8
Yoo Byung-hoon	Men's 400 m T53	51.38	4	Did not advance	
Yoo Byung-hoon	Men's 800 m T53	—N/a		1:41.20 SB	7
Yoo Byung-hoon	Men's marathon T54	—N/a		1:52:05 SB	12
Jeon Min-jae	Women's 100 m T36	14.69 SB	5 q	14.95	7
Jeon Min-jae	Women's 200 m T36	31.13 SB	4 q	30.76 SB	5

Field events

Athlete	Event	Final	
Athlete	Event	Distance	Position
Jung Ji-song	Men's shot put F41	10.72	5

== Badminton ==
South Korea has qualified six para badminton players for the following events, through the release of BWF para-badminton Race to Paris Paralympic Ranking.

Men

Athlete	Event	Group Stage				Quarterfinals	Semifinal	Final / BM	
Athlete	Event	Opposition Score	Opposition Score	Opposition Score	Rank	Opposition Score	Opposition Score	Opposition Score	Rank
Choi Jung-man	Singles WH1	Nagashima (JPN); W 2–0	Murayama (JPN); W 2–0	—N/a	1 Q	—N/a	Jeong (KOR); W 2–0	Qu (CHN); L 0–2	2nd place, silver medalist(s)
Jeong Jae-gun	Singles WH1	Qu (CHN); L 0–2	Ramli (MAS); W 2–1	—N/a	2 Q	Murayama (JPN); W 2–0	Choi (KOR); L 0–2	Wandschneider (GER); L 0–2	4
Yu Soo-young	Singles WH2	Mai (CHN); W 2–0	Hellmann (GER); W 2–1	—N/a	1 Q	—N/a	Chan (HKG); L 0–2	Kim (KOR); L 1–2	4
Kim Jung-jun	Singles WH2	Jakobs (FRA); W 2–1	Levi (ISR); W 2–0	—N/a	1 Q	—N/a	Kajiwara (JPN); L 0–2	Yu (KOR); W 2–1	3rd place, bronze medalist(s)
Shin Kyung-hwan	Singles SL4	Yathiraj (IND); L 0–2	Ramdani (INA); L 1–2	—N/a	3	Did not advance			
Choi Jung-man; Kim Jung-jun	Doubles WH1–2	Jeong / Yu (KOR); L 0–2	Matsumoto / Nagashima (JPN); L0-2	Jakobs / Toupe (FRA); W2-1	3	Did not advance			
Jeong Jae-gun; Yu Soo-young	Doubles WH1–2	Choi / Kim (KOR); W 2–0	Jakobs / Toupe (FRA); W 2–0	Matsumoto / Nagashima (JPN); W 2–0	1 Q	—N/a	Matsumoto / Nagashima (JPN); W 2–0	Mai/ Qu (CHN); L 0–2	2nd place, silver medalist(s)

Women

Athlete	Event	Group Stage				Quarterfinals	Semifinal	Final / BM	
Athlete	Event	Opposition Score	Opposition Score	Opposition Score	Rank	Opposition Score	Opposition Score	Opposition Score	Rank
Kwon Hyun-ah	Singles WH1	Koósz (AUT); W 2–0	To (BEL); L 0–2	—N/a	2 Q	To (BEL); L 0–2	Did not advance		
Jung Gye-oul	Singles WH2	Ginns (AUS); WDN	Weitwithan (THA); L 1–2	—N/a	2	Renggli (SUI); L 0–2	Did not advance		
Jung Gye-oul; Kwon Hyun-ah	Doubles WH1–2	Satomi / Yamazaki (JPN); L 0–2	Liu / Yin (CHN); L 0–2	—N/a	3	Did not advance			

== Boccia ==
South Korea confirmed two quotas (one in men and one in women), by virtue of their result as the highest rank nation's in the BC3 pairs event, at the 2023 Asian/Oceanian Championships in Hong Kong; the nations also secured one teams quota in mixed BC1/BC2 teams through the final world ranking.

Athlete	Event	Pool matches				Round of 16	Quarterfinals	Semifinals	Final / BM	
Athlete	Event	Opposition Score	Opposition Score	Opposition Score	Rank	Opposition Score	Opposition Score	Opposition Score	Opposition Score	Rank
Jung Sung-joon	Men's individual BC1	Huadpradit (THA); L 3–7	Sánchez Reyes (MEX); W 3*–3	—N/a	2 Q	—N/a	Ramos (POR); W 3–2	Smith (GBR); W 4–3	Loung (HKG); L 1–4	2nd place, silver medalist(s)
Kim Doh-yun	Men's individual BC1	Král (SVK); L 2–4	Syafa (INA); L 4–7	—N/a	3	Did not advance				11
Seo Min-kyu	Men's individual BC2	Rombouts (BEL); W 5–2	Saengampa (THA); L 3–5	Ben Youb (TUN); L 4–6	3	Did not advance				13
Jeong Ho-won	Men's individual BC3	Romero (COL); W 12–2	Choocheunklin (THA); W 4–0	Gonçalves (POR); W 4–2	1 Q	—N/a	Menard (FRA); W 4–1	Iskrzycki (POL); W 6–1	Michel (AUS); W 5–2	1st place, gold medalist(s)
Jeong So-yeong	Women's individual BC2	Haggo (GBR); W 3–1	Correia (POR); W 4–3	—N/a	1 Q	—N/a	van Engelen (NED); W 4–3	Taggart (GBR); W 3–2	Gonçalves (POR); L 1–4	2nd place, silver medalist(s)
Kang Sun-hee	Women's individual BC3	Leeson (AUS); W 6–1	de Oliveira (BRA); W 7–0	Kidson (GBR); W 7–0	1 Q	—N/a	Ichinoe (JPN); W 3–2	Ho (HKG); L 1–4	Calado (BRA); W 7–2	3rd place, bronze medalist(s)
Jeong Ho-won; Kang Sun-hee	Mixed pairs BC3	Great Britain (GBR); W 6–2	Thailand (THA); L 2–5	—N/a	2 Q	—N/a	Australia (AUS); W 4–2	Argentina (ARG); W 4–2	Hong Kong (HKG); L 3–5	2nd place, silver medalist(s)
Jung Sung-joon; Seo Min-kyu; Jeong So-yeong	Mixed team BC1/BC2	Tunisia (TUN); W 19–1	Japan (JPN); L 3–5	—N/a	2 Q	—N/a	Slovakia (SVK); W 8–4	China (CHN); L 3–7	Japan (JPN); L 3–8	4

== Cycling ==
=== Road ===
Athlete	Event	Time	Rank
Kim Yong-ki	Men's road race T1–2	1:41:38	11
Kim Yong-ki	Men's time trial T1–2	25:58.03	10
Lee Do-yeon	Women's road race H1–4	59:44	10
Lee Do-yeon	Women's time trial H4–5	28:36.01	11

== Goalball ==
Summary

Team	Event	Group Stage				Quarterfinal	Semifinal	Final / BM	
Team	Event	Opposition Score	Opposition Score	Opposition Score	Rank	Opposition Score	Opposition Score	Opposition Score	Rank
South Korea women's	Women's tournament	Japan; L 1–3	France; W 6–1	Canada; D 0–0	3 Q	Turkey; L 3–6	—N/a	France; W 2–2 (2–1 p)	7

=== Women's tournament ===
The South Korean women's goalball team entered the Paralympic games after being the runner-up at 2022 IBSA Goalball World Championships in Matosinhos, Portugal.

Team roster

Coach: Jung Eun-sun

The following is the South Korea squad in the goalball tournament of the 2024 Summer Paralympics.

No.	Player	Class	Date of birth (age)
1	Kim Hee-jin	B3	29 November 1994 (aged 29)
3	Kim Eun-ji	B2	23 April 1991 (aged 33)
4	Park Eun-ji	B1	2 June 1999 (aged 25)
6	Sim Seon-hwa	B2	2 March 1992 (aged 32)
7	Seo Min-ji	B2	29 December 2001 (aged 22)
8	Choi Eum-jee	B1	6 July 1999 (aged 25)

Group stage

Pos	Team	Pld	W	D	L	GF	GA	GD	Pts	Qualification
1	Japan	3	3	0	0	11	2	+9	9	Quarter-finals
2	Canada	3	1	1	1	11	2	+9	4	Quarter-finals
3	South Korea	3	1	1	1	7	4	+3	4	Quarter-finals
4	France (H)	3	0	0	3	1	22	−21	0	Quarter-finals

Source: Paris 2024
Rules for classification: 1) points; 2) goal difference; 3) number of wins; 4) goals against; 5) head-to-head goal difference.
(H) Hosts
29 August 2024
19:00

South Korea	1–3	Japan
Sim Seon-hwa 3'	Report	Hagiwara 7', 17', 23'

South Paris Arena, Paris
Referee:
Linda Welborn (United States)
Patrik Larsson (Sweden)

31 August 2024
19:00

France	1–6	South Korea
Ajami 0'	Report	Sim Seon-hwa 3', 14', 15', 16'; Park Eun-ji 14', 15'

South Paris Arena, Paris
Referee:
Kazuto Ono (Japan)
Sarah Kuper (Germany)

1 September 2024
10:30

South Korea	0–0	Canada
	Report

South Paris Arena, Paris
Referee:
Romualdas Vaitiekus (Lithuania)
Kazuto Ono (Japan)

Quarter-finals

3 September 2024
19:45

Turkey	6–3	South Korea
Sevd. Altunoluk 0', 2', 6', 12'; Güler 6'; Altan 22'	Report	Seo Min-ji 5'; Sim Seon-hwa 17', 23'

South Paris Arena, Paris
Referee:
Antonios Christodoulos (Greece)
Linda Welborn (United States)

Seventh place match

4 September 2024
10:00

South Korea	2–2	France
Sim Seon-hwa 3'; Seo Min-ji 11'	Report	Rondepierre 7'; Ajami 20'
Penalties
Kim Hee-jin (penalty missed); Sim Seon-hwa (penalty missed); Seo Min-ji (penalty missed); Park Eun-ji (penalty scored); Kim Eun-ji (penalty scored); Choi Eum-jee (penalty missed)	2–1	(penalty missed) Gonzalez; (penalty scored) Berquier; (penalty missed) Ajami; (penalty missed) Matos; (penalty missed) Rondepierre; (penalty missed) Alhan

South Paris Arena, Paris
Referee:
Patrik Larsson (Sweden)
Claude Dagenais (Canada)

== Judo ==
Athlete	Event	Round of 16	Quarterfinals	Semifinals	Repechage round 1	Repechage round 2	Final/ Bronze medal contest	
Athlete	Event	Opposition Result	Opposition Result	Opposition Result	Opposition Result	Opposition Result	Opposition Result	Rank
Lee Min-jae	Men's –60 kg J2	Bye	Marques da Silva (BRA); W 10–0	Namozov (UZB); L 0–10	—N/a	Bye	Khorava (UKR); L 0–10	5
Kim Dong-hoon	Men's –73 kg J2	Ibáñez (ESP); W 1–0	Bareikis (LTU); L 0–1	Did not advance	—N/a	Chang (TPE); W 10–0	Kuranbaev (UZB); L 0–1	5

== Paracanoeing ==
South Korea earned quota places for the following events through the 2024 ICF Canoe Sprint World Championships in Szeged, Hungary.

Athlete	Event	Heats		Semifinal		Final	
Athlete	Event	Time	Rank	Time	Rank	Time	Rank
Choi Yong-beom	Men's KL3	42.42	4 SF	42.26	4 FA	41.91	8

== Paratriathlon ==
Athlete	Event	Swim	Trans 1	Bike	Trans 2	Run	Total time	Rank
Kim Hwang-tae	Men's PTS3	24:58	1:06	35:29	1:09	21:19	1:24:01	10

== Powerlifting ==
Athlete	Event	Weight	Rank
Kim Gyu-ho	Men's –80 kg	202	4
Kim Hyeong-hui	Women's –67 kg	95	9
Jeong Youn-shil	Women's –73 kg	100	6
Yang Jae-won	Women's –86 kg	115	5

== Rowing ==
Kazakhstan qualified one boats in women's single sculls classes, by virtue of the highest ranked eligible boats, at the 2024 Asia/Oceania Continental Qualification Regatta in Chungju.

Athlete	Event	Heats		Repechage		Final	
Athlete	Event	Time	Rank	Time	Rank	Time	Rank
Kim Sejeong	PR1 women's single sculls	10:45.53	3 R	10:52.23	2 FA	11:20.44	5
Kang Hyounjoo; Bae Jiin; Choi Seonwoong; Lee Seungho coxswain= Seo Hakyung	PR3 mixed coxed four	7:51.27	5 R	7:30.93	5 FB	7:43.93	10

Qualification Legend: FA=Final A (medal); FB=Final B (non-medal); R=Repechage

== Shooting ==
South Korea entered twelve para-shooter's after achieved quota places for the following events by virtue of their best finishes at the 2022, 2023 and 2024 world cup, 2022 World Championships, 2023 World Championships and 2022 Asian Para Games, as long as they obtained a minimum qualifying score (MQS) by July 15, 2024.

Men

Athlete	Event	Qualification		Final	
Athlete	Event	Points	Rank	Points	Rank
Jo Jeong-du	P1 – 10 m air pistol SH1	577	1 Q	237.4	1st place, gold medalist(s)
Kim Jung-nam	P1 – 10 m air pistol SH1	546	24	Did not advance	
Park Jin-ho	R1 – 10 m air rifle standing SH1	624.4	1 Q	249.4 PR	1st place, gold medalist(s)
Shim Young-jip	R1 – 10 m air rifle standing SH1	616.0	11	Did not advance	
Park Jin-ho	R7 – 50 m rifle three positions SH1	1179 PQR	1 Q	454.6 PR	1st place, gold medalist(s)
Shim Young-jip	R7 – 50 m rifle three positions SH1	1114	17	Did not advance	

Women

Athlete	Event	Qualification		Final	
Athlete	Event	Points	Rank	Points	Rank
Park Myung-soon	P2 – 10 m air pistol SH1	531	15	Did not advance	
Lee Yoo-jeong	R2 – 10 m air rifle standing SH1	614.8	11	Did not advance	
Lee Yun-ri	R2 – 10 m air rifle standing SH1	624.0	4 Q	246.8	2nd place, silver medalist(s)
Lee Yoo-jeong	R8 – 50 m rifle three positions SH1	1136	16	Did not advance	
Lee Yun-ri	R8 – 50 m rifle three positions SH1	1164	5 Q	398.7	7

Mixed

Athlete	Event	Qualification		Final	
Athlete	Event	Points	Rank	Points	Rank
Kim Jung-nam	P3 – 25 m pistol SH1	579	1 Q	24	3rd place, bronze medalist(s)
Park Sea-kyun	P3 – 25 m pistol SH1	572	5 Q	10	7
Jo Jeong-du	P4 – 50 m pistol SH1	553 PQR	1 Q	181.0	4
Park Sea-kyun	P4 – 50 m pistol SH1	536	5 Q	124.7	7
Lee Yoo-jeong	R3 – 10 m air rifle prone SH1	625.3	33	Did not advance	
Lee Yun-ri	R3 – 10 m air rifle prone SH1	631.3	17	Did not advance	
Park Dong-an	R4 – 10 m air rifle standing SH2	631.1	7 Q	146.5	7
Seo Hun-tae	R4 – 10 m air rifle standing SH2	637.4	2 Q	231.7	3rd place, bronze medalist(s)
Lee Cheol-jae	R5 – 10 m air rifle prone SH2	637.1	3 Q	147.0	7
Park Dong-an	R5 – 10 m air rifle prone SH2	635.4	12	Did not advance	
Park Jin-ho	R6 – 50 m air rifle prone SH1	624.8	7 Q	164.6	6
Shim Young-jip	R6 – 50 m air rifle prone SH1	608.9	33	Did not advance	
Kim Youn-mi	R9 – 50 m rifle prone SH2	619.5	15	Did not advance	
Lee Cheol-jae	R9 – 50 m rifle prone SH2	617.5	18	Did not advance	

== Swimming ==
South Korea entered six swimmers (five men and one woman), by virtue of the results at the 2023 World Para Swimming Championships after finishing in the top two places in Paralympic class disciplines; and through the Minimum Qualification Standard (MQS) allocation slots.

Athlete	Events	Heats		Final	
Athlete	Events	Time	Rank	Time	Rank
Cho Won-sang	Men's 100 m butterfly S14	59.92	11	Did not advance	
Jo Gi-seong	Men's 50 m backstroke S4	54.75	14	Did not advance	
Jo Gi-seong	Men's 50 m breaststroke SB3	—N/a		50.73	4
Jo Gi-seong	Men's 150 m individual medley SM4	2:41.11	4 Q	2:37.45	4
Lee In-kook	Men's 100 m backstroke S14	1:02.18	9	Did not advance	
Lee In-kook	Men's 100 m butterfly S14	59.15	9	Did not advance	
Kang Jung-eun	Women's 100 m backstroke S14	1:15.73	13	Did not advance	
Kang Jung-eun	Women's 100 m butterfly S14	1:11.60	12	Did not advance	

== Table tennis ==
South Korea entered fifteen table tennis players to compete for Paris 2024. Four of them qualified for Paris 2024 by virtue of their gold medal results, in their respective class, at the 2022 Asian Para Games in Hangzhou; meanwhile, the other eleven athletes qualified for the games through the allocations of ITTF final ranking.

Men

Athlete	Event	Round of 32	Round of 16	Quarterfinals	Semifinals	Final / BM	
Athlete	Event	Opposition Result	Opposition Result	Opposition Result	Opposition Result	Opposition Result	Rank
Joo Young-dae	Individual C1	—N/a	Bye	Falco (ITA); L 2–3	Did not advance		5
Kim Hak-jin	Individual C1	—N/a	Bye	Davies (GBR); L 2–3	Did not advance		5
Park Jin-cheol	Individual C2	Bye	Yezyk (UKR); W 3–2	Lamirault (FRA); L 0–3	Did not advance		5
Cha Soo-yong	Individual C2	Bye	Chueawong (THA); W 3–0	Flores (CHI); W 3–0	Czuper (POL); L 1–3	Did not advance	3rd place, bronze medalist(s)
Jang Yeong-jin	Individual C3	Bye	Nalepka (POL); W 3–1	Emburgh (USA); W 3–2	Feng (CHN); L 0–3	Did not advance	3rd place, bronze medalist(s)
Baek Young-bok	Individual C3	Chen (AUS); W 3–0	Merrien (FRA); L 1–3	Did not advance			9
Kim Young-gun	Individual C4	—N/a	López (ESP); W 3–0	Trávníček (SVK); W 3–1	Ogunkunle (NGR); W 3–1	Chaiwut (THA); W 3–2	1st place, gold medalist(s)
Kim Jung-gil	Individual C4	—N/a	Mihálik (SVK); W 3–1	Turan (TUR); W 3–1	Chaiwut (THA); L 2–3	Did not advance	3rd place, bronze medalist(s)
Kim Gi-tae	Individual C11	—N/a	Bye	Gomes (BRA); W 3–1	Von Einem (AUS); W 3–1	Chen (TPE); W 3–1	1st place, gold medalist(s)
Cha Soo-yong; Park Jin-cheol	Doubles MD4	—N/a	Bye	Crosara / Falco (ITA); W 3–0	Lovaš / Riapoš (SVK); L 2–3	Did not advance	3rd place, bronze medalist(s)
Jang Yeong-jin; Park Sung-joo	Doubles MD4	—N/a	Bye	Davies / Matthews (GBR); W 3–0	Lamirault / Michaud (FRA); W 3–1	Lovaš / Riapoš (SVK); L 1–3	2nd place, silver medalist(s)
Kim Young-gun; Kim Jung-gil	Doubles MD8	—N/a	Flores / Rodríguez (CHI); W 3–0	Öztürk / Turan (TUR); L 0–3	Did not advance		5

Women

Athlete	Event	Round of 16	Quarterfinals	Semifinals	Final / BM	
Athlete	Event	Opposition Result	Opposition Result	Opposition Result	Opposition Result	Rank
Seo Su-yeon	Individual C1–2	Bye	Spegel (GER); W 3–0	Liu (CHN); L 2–3	Did not advance	3rd place, bronze medalist(s)
Lee Mi-gyu	Individual C3	Elshamy (EGY); W 3–0	Xue (CHN); L 1–3	Did not advance		5
Yoon Ji-yu	Individual C3	Bye	Oliveira (BRA); W 3–1	Ragazzini (ITA); W 3–1	Mužinić (CRO); L 2–3	2nd place, silver medalist(s)
Jung Young-a	Individual C5	Bye	Saint-Pierre (FRA); W 3–2	Pan (CHN); L 1–3	Did not advance	3rd place, bronze medalist(s)
Moon Sung-hye	Individual C5	Bye	Sringam (THA); W 3–0	Zhang (CHN); L 1–3	Did not advance	3rd place, bronze medalist(s)
Kim Seong-ok	Individual C7	Abdelaziz (EGY); W 3–0	Wang (CHN); L 0–3	Did not advance		5
Seo Su-yeon; Yoon Ji-yu	Doubles WD5	—N/a	Bye	C Oliveira / J Oliveira (BRA); W 3–0	Liu / Xue (CHN); L 1–3	2nd place, silver medalist(s)
Jung Young-a; Moon Sung-hye	Doubles WD10	Bye	B Patel / S Patel (IND); W 3–1	Gu / Pan (CHN); L 0–3	Did not advance	3rd place, bronze medalist(s)
Kang Oe-jeong; Lee Mi-gyu	Doubles WD10	Mikolaschek / Spegel (GER); W 3–2	Zhang / Zhou (CHN); W 3–2	Matić / Perić-Ranković (SRB); L 1–3	Did not advance	3rd place, bronze medalist(s)

Mixed

Athlete	Event	Round of 32	Round of 16	Quarterfinals	Semifinals	Final / BM	
Athlete	Event	Opposition Result	Opposition Result	Opposition Result	Opposition Result	Opposition Result	Rank
Kim Jung-gil; Yoon Ji-yu	Doubles XD7	Bye	Romero / Garrone (ARG); W 3–0	Zhai / Gu (CHN); L 0–3	Did not advance		5
Kim Young-gun; Lee Mi-gyu	Doubles XD7	Bye	Baus / Spegel (GER); W 3–1	Merrien / Vautier (FRA); L 2–3	Did not advance		5

== Taekwondo ==
South Korea entered two athletes to compete at the Paralympics competition. Joo Jeong-hun qualified for Paris 2024, by virtue of finishing within the top six in the Paralympic rankings in men's 80 kg class; meanwhile Lee Dong-ho qualified for Paris 2024, after winning the gold medal results in under 63 class, through the 2024 Asian Qualification Tournament in Tai'an, China.

Athlete	Event	First round	Quarterfinals	Semifinals	Repechage	Final / BM	
Athlete	Event	Opposition Result	Opposition Result	Opposition Result	Opposition Result	Opposition Result	Rank
Lee Dong-ho	Men's –63 kg	Milad (ISR); L 12–27	Did not advance				
Joo Jeong-hun	Men's –80 kg	Bye	Spajić (SRB); W 8–1	Nájera (MEX); L 8–10	—N/a	Dombayev (KAZ); W 7–1	3rd place, bronze medalist(s)

== Wheelchair fencing ==
Athlete	Event	Round of 32	Round of 16	Quarterfinals	Semifinals	Repechage 1	Repechage 2	Repechage 3	Repechage 4	Final / BM	
Athlete	Event	Opposition Result	Opposition Result	Opposition Result	Opposition Result	Opposition Result	Opposition Result	Opposition Result	Opposition Result	Opposition Result	Rank
Baek Gyeong-hye	Women's épée A	Dróżdż (POL); L 9–15	Did not advance								21
Baek Gyeong-hye	Women's foil A	Taylor (USA); L 5–15	Did not advance								19
Cho Eun-hye	Women's épée B	—N/a	Santos (BRA); W 15–1	Ao (CHN); L 10–15	Did not advance	—N/a	Lowthian (CAN); L 7–15	Did not advance			9
Cho Eun-hye	Women's foil B	—N/a	Chung (HKG); L 10–15	Did not advance		Bye	Tong (HKG); W 15–9	Doloh (UKR); W 15–5	Sakurai (JPN); W 15–14	Vio (ITA); L 2–15	4
Cho Eun-hye	Women's sabre B	—N/a	Lowthian (CAN); W 15–8	Jana (THA); L 3–15	Did not advance	—N/a	Tong (HKG); W 15–5	Ao (CHN); L 6–15	Did not advance		7
Kwon Hyo-kyeong	Women's épée A	Bye	Taylor (USA); W 15–7	Vidé (FRA); W 15–13	Veres (HUN); W 15–13	—N/a				Chen (CHN); L 6–15	2nd place, silver medalist(s)
Kwon Hyo-kyeong	Women's foil A	Bye	Tibilashvili (GEO); W 15–4	Gu (CHN); L 5–15	Did not advance	—N/a	Fan (HKG); W 15–14	Krajnyák (HUN); L 14–15	Did not advance		8
Kwon Hyo-kyeong	Women's sabre A	Fan (HKG); W 15–8	Tibilashvili (GEO); L 5–15	Did not advance		Fidrych (POL); W 15–8	Morkvych (UKR); L 8–15	Did not advance			12
Baek Gyeong-hye; Cho Eun-hye; Kwon Hyo-kyeong	Women's épée team	—N/a	Bye	Thailand (THA); L 42–45	Did not advance						7
Baek Gyeong-hye; Cho Eun-hye; Kwon Hyo-kyeong	Women's foil team	—N/a	Thailand (THA); W 45–42	China (CHN); L 22–45	Did not advance						7

== Wheelchair tennis ==
Athlete	Event	Round of 64	Round of 32	Round of 16	Quarterfinals	Semifinals	Final / BM	
Athlete	Event	Opposition Result	Opposition Result	Opposition Result	Opposition Result	Opposition Result	Opposition Result	Rank
Han Sung-bong	Men's singles	Langmann (AUT); L 2–6, 6–0, 2–6	Did not advance					
Im Ho-won	Men's singles	Bin Yusuf (MAS); W 6–2, 6–3	Caverzaschi (ESP); L 6–4, 4–6, 6–7	Did not advance				
Han Sung-bong; Im Ho-won	Men's doubles	—N/a	Bye	Langmann / Riegler (AUT); W 6–2, 6–0	Miki / Oda (JPN); L 1–6, 4–6	Did not advance		

== See also ==
- South Korea at the 2024 Summer Olympics
- South Korea at the Paralympics
