= Slovakia at the 2024 Summer Paralympics =

- IPC code: SVK
- NPC: Slovak Paralympic Committee
- Website: www.spv.sk

in Paris, France August 28, 2024 – September 8, 2024
- Competitors: 26 in 8 sports
- Flag bearers: Alena Kánová; Patrik Kuril
- Medals Ranked 35th: Gold 3 Silver 2 Bronze 0 Total 5

Summer Paralympics appearances (overview)
- 1996; 2000; 2004; 2008; 2012; 2016; 2020; 2024

Other related appearances
- Czechoslovakia (1972–1992)

Slovakia competed at the 2024 Summer Paralympics in Paris, France, from 28 August to 8 September.

== Medalists ==
Medal	Name	Sport	Event	Date
Gold	Jozef Metelka	Cycling	Men's individual pursuit C4	31 August
Gold	Peter Lovaš; Ján Riapoš	Table tennis	Men's doubles MD4	31 August
Gold	Veronika Vadovičová	Shooting	R3 Mixed 10 metre rifle prone SH1	1 September
Silver	Radoslav Malenovský	Shooting	R3 Mixed 10 metre rifle prone SH1	1 September
Silver	Veronika Vadovičová	Shooting	R8 – 50 m rifle 3 position SH1	3 September

Medals by sport
Sport	1	2	3	Total
Shooting	1	2	0	3
Cycling	1	0	0	1
Table tennis	1	0	0	1
Total	3	2	0	5

=== Multiple Medallists ===
Multiple medallists
Name	Sport	1st place, gold medalist(s)	2nd place, silver medalist(s)	3rd place, bronze medalist(s)	Total
Veronika Vadovičová	Shooting	1	1	0	2

== Competitors ==
The following is the list of number of competitors in the Games.

Sport	Men	Women	Total
Archery	3	0	3
Athletics	3	0	3
Boccia	3	2	5
Cycling	2	0	2
Equestrian	0	1	1
Shooting	1	2	3
Swimming	0	2	2
Table tennis	6	1	7
Total	18	8	26

== Archery ==
Slovakia secured three quota places. Two of the quotas being obtained in the men's recurve and compound event by virtue of their result at the 2023 World Para Archery Championships in Plzeň, Czech Republic, meanwhile the other being obtained through the 2023 European Para Championships in Rotterdam, Netherlands.

Athlete	Event	Ranking Round		Round of 32	Round of 16	Quarterfinals	Semifinals	Finals	
Athlete	Event	Score	Seed	Opposition Score	Opposition Score	Opposition Score	Opposition Score	Opposition Score	Rank
Martin Dorič	Men's individual compound	674	27	MacQueen (GBR); L 138-142	Did not advance				17
Marcel Pavlík	Men's individual compound	688	16	Guerin (FRA); L 138-143	Did not advance				17
Dávid Ivan	Men's individual recurve	604	19	Lixue (CHN); L 4-6	Did not advance				9

== Athletics ==
Slovak track and field athletes achieved quota places for the following events based on their results at the 2023 World Championships, 2024 World Championships, or through high performance allocation, as long as they meet the minimum entry standard (MES).

Key

- Note–Ranks given for track events are within the athlete's heat only
- Q = Qualified for the next round
- q = Qualified for the next round as a fastest loser or, in field events, by position without achieving the qualifying target
- DQ = Disqualified
- PR = Paralympic Record
- AR = Area (or continental) Record
- NR = National Record
- SB = Season's Best
- N/A = Round not applicable for the event
- Bye = Athlete not required to compete in round

Field events

Athlete	Event	Final	
Athlete	Event	Distance	Position
Marián Kuřeja	Men's club throw F51	Withdrew	
Dušan Laczkó	Men's discus throw F56	41.20	4
Ladislav Čuchran	Men's javelin throw F54	27.33	6

== Boccia ==
Slovakia entered five athletes into the Paralympics games, after nominated top four pairs in mixed BC4 events, through the final world ranking; and also by winning the bronze medal in the mixed team event for BC1/BC2, at the 2024 Paralympic Qualification Tournament in Coimbra, Portugal.

Athlete	Event	Pool matches				Quarterfinals	Semifinals	Final / BM	
Athlete	Event	Opposition Score	Opposition Score	Opposition Score	Rank	Opposition Score	Opposition Score	Opposition Score	Rank
Tomáš Král	Men's individual BC1	Syafa (INA); L 3–5	Kim (KOR); W 4–2	—N/a	2 Q	Smith (GBR); L 1–6	did not advanced		7
Róbert Mezík	Men's individual BC2	Sayes (ESA); W 6–1	Maguenni (FRA); W 8–0	Vongsa (THA); W 5–0	1 Q	Cristaldo (ARG); W 5–4	Herlangga (INA); L 1–6	Vongsa (THA); L 2–3	4
Martin Strehársky	Men's individual BC4	Komar (CRO); L 0-10	Chica (COL); L 1-4	Agache (ESP); W 4-3	3	did not advance			12
Eliška Jankechová	Women's individual BC2	Yeung (HKG); L 0-8	Duarte (ESA); L 0-12	—N/a	3	did not advance			12
Kristína Vozárová	Women's individual BC4	Phonsila (THA); L 0-11	Cheung (HKG); L 0-14	Lin (CHN); L 0-14	4	did not advance			16
Tomáš Král; Eliška Jankechová; Róbert Mezík	Mixed team BC1/BC2	Thailand (THA); W 9-2	Brazil (BRA); W 6-5	—N/a	1 Q	South Korea (KOR); L 4-8	Did not advance		
Martin Strehársky; Kristína Vozárová	Mixed pairs BC4	Spain (ESP); W 6-2	Thailand (THA); L 1-8	—N/a	2 Q	Hong Kong (HKG); L 10-2	Did not advance		

== Cycling ==
Slovakia entered two male para-cyclists after finishing the top eligible nation's at the 2022 UCI Nation's ranking allocation ranking.

=== Road ===
Athlete	Event	Time	Rank
Patrik Kuril	Men's road race C4-5	DNS	=
Patrik Kuril	Men's time trial C4	40:47.86	9
Jozef Metelka	Men's road race C4-5	DNF	=
Jozef Metelka	Men's time trial C4	38:42.52	6

=== Track ===
Athlete	Event	Qualification		Final	
Athlete	Event	Time	Rank	Opposition Time	Rank
Jozef Metelka	Men's 1000 m time trial C4-5	1:04.944	6 Q	1:07.938	6
Jozef Metelka	Men's 4000 m individual pursuit C4	4:22.800	2 QG	4:27.920	1st place, gold medalist(s)

== Equestrian ==
Slovakia entered one para-equestrian into the Paralympic equestrian competition, by virtue of the nations individual final world para dressage rankings.

Individual

Athlete	Horse	Event	Total	
Athlete	Horse	Event	Score	Rank
Lucia Vladovičová	Sterngreifer	Individual championship test grade I	64.500	19

== Shooting ==
Slovakia entered two para-shooter's after achieved quota places for the following events by virtue of their best finishes at the 2022, 2023 and 2024 world cup, 2022 World Championships, 2023 World Championships, 2023 European Para Championships and 2024 European Championships, as long as they obtained a minimum qualifying score (MQS) by July 15, 2024.

Men

Athlete	Event	Qualification		Final	
Athlete	Event	Points	Rank	Points	Rank
Radoslav Malenovský	R7 – 50 m rifle 3 positions SH1	1147	12	did not advanced	
Radoslav Malenovský	R3 Mixed 10 metre rifle prone SH1	636.0	4 Q	253.6	2nd place, silver medalist(s)
Radoslav Malenovský	R6 Mixed 50 metre rifle prone SH1	615.0	26	did not advanced	

Women

Athlete	Event	Qualification		Final	
Athlete	Event	Points	Rank	Points	Rank
Veronika Vadovičová	R2 – 10 m rifle standing SH1	624.2	3 Q	165.0	6
Veronika Vadovičová	R8 – 50 m rifle 3 position SH1	1169	2 Q	456.1	2nd place, silver medalist(s)
Veronika Vadovičová	R3 Mixed 10 metre rifle prone SH1	637.8	1 Q	254.2 PR	1st place, gold medalist(s)
Kristína Funková	R5 Mixed 10 metre rifle prone SH2	629.5	29	did not advance	
Kristína Funková	R9 Mixed 50 metre rifle prone SH2	611.3	22	did not advance	

== Swimming ==
Women

Athlete	Event	Heats		Final	
Athlete	Event	Result	Rank	Result	Rank
Tatiana Blattnerová	50 m freestyle S11	33.71	12	did not advance	
Tatiana Blattnerová	100 m freestyle S11	1:13.63	11	did not advance	
Tatiana Blattnerová	400 m freestyle S11	5:47.99	10	did not advance	
Tatiana Blattnerová	100 m breaststroke S11	1:36.29	9	did not advance	
Karina Petrikovičová	100 m freestyle S12	1:05.16	9	did not advance	
Karina Petrikovičová	100 m backstroke S12	1:14.94	6 Q	1:14.63	7
Karina Petrikovičová	100 m breaststroke S12	1:32.51	9	did not advance	

== Table tennis ==
Slovakia entered four athletes for the Paralympic games. All of them qualified through the allocations of the final ITTF world ranking.

Athlete	Event	Round of 32	Round of 16	Quarterfinals	Semifinals	Final / BM	
Athlete	Event	Opposition Result	Opposition Result	Opposition Result	Opposition Result	Opposition Result	Rank
Peter Lovaš	Men's individual C2	—N/a	Elmahsy (EGY); W 3-2	Suchánek (CZE); L 0-3	did not advance		
Martin Ludrovský	Men's individual C2	—N/a	Crosara (ITA); L 1-3	did not advance			
Boris Trávníček	Men's individual C4	—N/a	Nacházel (CZE); W 3-0	Kim (KOR); L 1-3	did not advance		
Peter Mihálik	Men's individual C4	—N/a	Kim (KOR); L 1-3	did not advance			
Richard Csejtey	Men's individual C8	Pellissier (AUS); W 3-1	McKibbin (GBR); L 2-3	did not advance			
Peter Mihálik; Boris Trávníček	Men's doubles MD8	—N/a	Martin (FRA)/ Thomas (FRA); L 0-3	did not advance			
Peter Lovaš; Ján Riapoš	Men's doubles MD4	—N/a		Sastre (ESP)/ Toledo (ESP); W 3-2	Cha (KOR)/ Park (KOR); W 3-2	Jang (KOR)/ Park (KOR); W 3-1	1st place, gold medalist(s)
Alena Kánová	Women's individual C3	—N/a	Dretar Karic (CRO); L 1-3	did not advance			
Alena Kánová; Boris Trávníček	Mixed doubles XD7	Ramadan (EGY)/ Elshamy (EGY); W 3-0	Öztürk (TUR)/ Duman (TUR); W 3-0	Feng (CHN)/ Zhou (CHN); L 1-3	did not advance		

== See also ==
- Slovakia at the 2024 Summer Olympics
- Slovakia at the Paralympics
