= South Korea at the 2020 Summer Paralympics =

- IPC code: KOR
- NPC: Korea Paralympic Committee
- Website: www.koreanpc.kr (in Korean)

in Tokyo
- Competitors: 86 in 14 sports
- Medals: Gold 2 Silver 10 Bronze 12 Total 24

Summer Paralympics appearances (overview)
- 1968; 1972; 1976; 1980; 1984; 1988; 1992; 1996; 2000; 2004; 2008; 2012; 2016; 2020; 2024

South Korea competed at the 2020 Summer Paralympics in Tokyo, Japan, from 24 August to 5 September 2021.

== Medalists ==
Medal	Name	Sport	Event	Date
Gold	Joo Young-dae	Table tennis	Men's individual – Class 1	30 August
Gold	Jeong Ho-won; Kim Han-soo; Choi Ye-jin	Boccia	Mixed pairs BC3	4 September
Silver	Seo Su-yeon	Table tennis	Women's individual class 1–2	28 August
Silver	Kim Hyeon-uk	Table tennis	Men's individual – Class 1	30 August
Silver	Kim Young-gun	Table tennis	Men's individual – Class 4	30 August
Silver	Park Jin-ho	Shooting	Mixed R3 10 metre air rifle prone SH1	1 September
Silver	Kim Jung-gil; Kim Young-gun	Table tennis	Men's team class 4–5	1 September
Silver	Yoon Ji-yu; Lee Mi-gyu	Table tennis	Women's team class 1–3	2 September
Silver	Cha Soo-yong; Park Jin-cheol	Table tennis	Men's team class 1–2	3 September
Silver	Lee Sam-seop	Badminton	Men's singles WH1	4 September
Silver	Kim Jung-jun	Badminton	Men's singles WH2	5 September
Silver	Kim Jung-jun; Lee Dong-seop	Badminton	Men's doubles WH1–WH2	5 September
Bronze	Lee Mi-gyu	Table tennis	Women's individual class 3	28 August
Bronze	Yoon Ji-yu	Table tennis	Women's individual class 3	28 August
Bronze	Park Jin-cheol	Table tennis	Men's individual class 2	28 August
Bronze	Cha Soo-yong	Table tennis	Men's individual class 2	28 August
Bronze	Nam Ki-won	Table tennis	Men's individual class 2	28 August
Bronze	Jung Young-a	Table tennis	Women's individual class 5	28 August
Bronze	Lee Jung-min	Judo	Men's 81 kg	28 August
Bronze	Choi Gwang-geun	Judo	Men's +100 kg	29 August
Bronze	Park Jin-ho	Shooting	Men's R1 10 metre air rifle standing SH1	30 August
Bronze	Shim Young-jip	Shooting	Men's R7 50 metre rifle 3 positions SH1	3 September
Bronze	Joo Jeong-hun	Taekwondo	Men's 75 kg	3 September
Bronze	Lee Dong-seop	Badminton	Men's singles WH1	4 September

== Competitors ==
Sport	Men	Women	Total
Archery	2	4	6
Athletics	1	1	2
Badminton	5	2	7
Boccia	5	2	7
Cycling	1	2	3
Judo	2	0	2
Powerlifting	2	3	5
Rowing	0	1	1
Shooting	8	4	12
Swimming	4	1	5
Table Tennis	11	8	19
Taekwondo	1	0	1
Wheelchair Basketball	12	0	12
Wheelchair Tennis	4	0	4
Total	58	28	86

== Archery ==
South Korea has qualified three archers in Women's Individual W1, Women's Individual Recurve, and Mixed Team Recurve.

== Athletics ==
Yoo Byung-hoon qualified in Men's 400m, 800m T53 events, while Jeon Min-jae qualified in Women's 200m T36.

== Badminton ==
South Korea has qualified a total of nine para badminton players for each of the following events into the Paralympic tournament based on the Para Badminton World Rankings.

Men

Athlete	Event	Group Stage				Quarterfinal	Semifinal	Final / BM	
Athlete	Event	Opposition Score	Opposition Score	Opposition Score	Rank	Opposition Score	Opposition Score	Opposition Score	Rank
Lee Dong-seop	Singles WH1	Homhual (THA); W (23–21, 21–16)	Wandschneider (GER); W (17–21, 21–19, 21–17)	—N/a	1 Q	Bye	Lee S-s (KOR); L (21–19, 7–21, 20–22)	Murayama (JPN); W (22–20, 17–21, 21–14)	3rd place, bronze medalist(s)
Lee Sam-seop	Singles WH1	Murayama (JPN); L (21–15, 13–21, 17–21)	Mi (GER); W (21–18, 21–13)	—N/a	2 Q	Homhual (THA); W (21–14, 21–16)	Lee D-s (KOR); W (19–21, 21–7, 22–20)	Qu (CHN); L (6–21, 6^{r}–11)	2nd place, silver medalist(s)
Kim Jung-jun	Singles WH2	Kim K-h (KOR); W (21–19, 21–15)	Manzoney (AUS); W (21–8, 21–9)	—N/a	1 Q	Bye	Chan (HKG); W (15–21, 21–15, 21–15)	Kajiwara (JPN); L (18–21, 19–21)	2nd place, silver medalist(s)
Kim Kyung-hoon	Singles WH2	Kim J-j (KOR); L (19–21, 15–21)	Manzoney (AUS); W (21–8, 21–5)	—N/a	2 Q	Mai (CHN); W (21–13, 21–12)	Kajiwara (JPN); L (14–21, 15–21)	Chan (HKG); L (22–24, 10–21)	4
Shin Kyung-hwan	Singles SL4	Setiawan (INA); L (8–21, 9–21)	Dhillon (IND); L (18–21, 21–15, 17–21)	Teamarrom (THA); W (21–17, 21–8)	3	—N/a	Did not advance		
Lee Dong-seop; Kim Jung-jun	Doubles WH1–WH2	Homhual / Junthong (THA); W (21–19, 21–12)	Toupé / Jakobs (FRA); W (21–11, 21–13)	—N/a	1 Q	—N/a	Homhual / Junthong (THA); W (21–18, 21–13)	Mai / Qu (CHN); L (10–21, 14–21)	2nd place, silver medalist(s)

Women

Athlete	Event	Group Stage			Quarterfinal	Semifinal	Final / BM	
Athlete	Event	Opposition Score	Opposition Score	Rank	Opposition Score	Opposition Score	Opposition Score	Rank
Kang Jung-kum	Singles WH1	Satomi (JPN); L (12–21, 7–21)	Yin (CHN); L (16–21, 14–21)	3	Did not advance			
Lee Sun-ae	Singles WH2	Yamazaki (JPN); L (20–22, 16–21)	Seçkin (TUR); L (21–12, 9–21, 16–21)	3	Did not advance			
Kang Jung-kum; Lee Sun-ae	Doubles WH1–WH2	Satomi / Yamazaki (JPN); L (12–21, 5–21)	Pookkham / Wetwithan (THA); L (9–21, 16–21)	3	—N/a	Did not advance		

== Boccia ==
Six South Korean athletes qualified in Individual BC1, BC2, and BC3 events.

== Cycling ==
South Korea sent one male and one female cyclist after receiving a slot in the 2018 UCI Nations Ranking Allocation Asian quota.

== Powerlifting ==
Athlete	Event	Total lifted	Rank
			-
			-
			-
			-
			-

== Rowing ==
South Korea qualified one boat in the women's single sculls for the games by winning the B-final at the 2019 World Rowing Championships in Ottensheim, Austria and securing the last of the seven available places.

Athlete	Event	Heats		Repechage		Final	
Athlete	Event	Time	Rank	Time	Rank	Time	Rank
Kim Se-jeong	Women's single sculls	12:19.02	3	11:04.59	3	12:18.83	7 (FB)

Qualification Legend: FA=Final A (medal); FB=Final B (non-medal); R=Repechage

== Shooting ==
Fourteen South Korean shooters have qualified.

- Park Chul (Mixed 25m Pistol SH1)
- Moon Aee-kyung (Mixed 50m Pistol SH1)
- Park Jin-ho & Lee Seung-chul (Men's 10m Air Rifle Standing SH1)
- Sim Jae-yong & Lee Jang-ho (Mixed 10m Air Rifle Prone SH1)
- Lee Ji-seok (Mixed 10m Air Rifle Standing SH2)
- Ju Sung-chul (Mixed 50m Rifle Prone SH1)
- Shim Young-jip (Men's 50m Rifle 3 Position)
- Lee Yun-ri & Kang Myung-soon (Women's 50m Rifle Three Position)

== Swimming ==
Five South Korean swimmers qualified for the Paralympic slot after passing the MQS.

== Table tennis ==
South Korea entered sixteen athletes into the table tennis competition at the games. Five athletes qualified from the 2019 ITTF Asian Para Championships which was held in Taichung, Taiwan and eleven athletes from the World Ranking allocation.

Men

Athlete	Event	Group Stage			Round of 16	Quarterfinals	Semifinals	Final	
Athlete	Event	Opposition Result	Opposition Result	Rank	Opposition Result	Opposition Result	Opposition Result	Opposition Result	Rank
Joo Young-dae	Individual C1	Falco (ITA); W 3–0	Eberhardt (ARG); W 3–0	1 Q	—N/a	Izquierdo (CUB); W 3–2	Nam (KOR); W 3–0	Kim H-u (KOR); W 3–1	1st place, gold medalist(s)
Kim Hyeon-uk	Individual C1	Keller (SUI); W 3–0	Izquierdo (CUB); W 3–0	1 Q	—N/a	Falco (ITA); W 3–0	Matthews (GBR); W 3–0	Joo (KOR); L 1–3	2nd place, silver medalist(s)
Nam Ki-won	Individual C1	Lavrov (RPC); W 3–0	Matthews (GBR); L 1–3	2 Q	—N/a	Major (HUN); W 3–0	Joo (KOR); L 0–3	Did not advance	3rd place, bronze medalist(s)
Park Jin-cheol	Individual C2	Reyes Turcio (MEX); W 3–0	Perlic (SRB); W 3–0	1 Q	Bye	Ludrovský (SVK); W 3–2	Czuper (POL); L 1–3	Did not advance	3rd place, bronze medalist(s)
Cha Soo-yong	Individual C2	Minami (JPN); W 3–2	Riapoš (SVK); W 3–0	1 Q	Bye	Yezyk (UKR); W 3–1	Lamirault (FRA); L 1–3	Did not advance	3rd place, bronze medalist(s)
Baek Young-bok	Individual C3	Schmidberger (GER); L 0–3	Toporkov (RPC); L 2–3	3	Did not advance				
Kim Young-gun	Individual C4	Mihálik (SVK); W 3–2	Lopez Sayago (ESP); W 3–1	1 Q	Bye	Saleh (EGY); W 3–0	Turan (TUR); W 3–1	Ozturk (TUR); L 1–3	2nd place, silver medalist(s)
Kim Jung-gil	Individual C4	Nacházel (CZE); L 1–3	Zylka (POL); W 3–1	2 Q	Trávniček (SVK); L 1–3	Did not advance			
Park Hong-kyu	Individual C6	Hamadtou (EGY); W 3–0	Chen (CHN); W 3–1	1 Q	Bye	Karabardak (GBR); L 2–3	Did not advance		
Kim Gi-tae	Individual C11	Von Einem (AUS); L 0–3	Asano (JPN); W 3–1	3	Did not advance				
Kim Chang-gi	Individual C11	Palos (HUN); L 1–3	Kato (JPN); W 3–1	2 Q	—N/a	Van Acker (BEL); L 1–3	Did not advance		
Park Jin-cheol; Cha Soo-yong	Team C1-2	—N/a				Spain (ESP); W 2–0	Poland (POL); W 2–1	France (FRA); L 0–2	2nd place, silver medalist(s)
Joo Young-dae; Nam Ki-won	Team C3	—N/a				Thailand (THA); L 0–2	Did not advance		
Kim Young-gun; Kim Jung-gil	Team C4-5	—N/a			Bye	Poland (POL); W 2–1	France (FRA); W 2–0	China (CHN); L 0–2	2nd place, silver medalist(s)

Women

Athlete	Event	Group Stage			Round of 16	Quarterfinals	Semifinals	Final	
Athlete	Event	Opposition Result	Opposition Result	Rank	Opposition Result	Opposition Result	Opposition Result	Opposition Result	Rank
Seo Su-yeon	Individual C1-2	Almyrisl (KSA); W 3–0	Pushpasheva (RPC); W 3–2	1 Q	—N/a	Prvulovic (SRB); W 3–0	Oliveira (BRA); W 3–1	Liu (CHN); L 1–3	2nd place, silver medalist(s)
Lee Mi-gyu	Individual C3	Li (CHN); W 3–0	Patel (IND); W 3–1	1 Q	Bye	Brunelli (ITA); W 3–0	Kánová (SVK); L 1–3	Did not advance	3rd place, bronze medalist(s)
Yoon Ji-yu	Individual C3	Amaral Santos (BRA); W 3–0	Kánová (SVK); W 3–0	1 Q	Bye	Mužinić (CRO); W 3–1	Xue (CHN); L 2–3	Did not advance	3rd place, bronze medalist(s)
Jung Young-a	Individual C5	Pan (CHN); W 3–2	Leonelli (CHI); W 3–0	1 Q	—N/a	Sringam (THA); W 3–1	Zhang (CHN); L 0–3	Did not advance	3rd place, bronze medalist(s)
Lee Kun-woo	Individual C6	Alieva (RPC); L 1–3	Aldayyeni (IRQ); W 3–1	2 Q	—N/a	Chebanika (RPC); L 2–3	Did not advance		
Moon Sung-keum	Individual C6	Chebanika (RPC); L 1–3	Grebe (GER); L 0–3	3	—N/a	Did not advance			
Kim Seong-ok	Individual C7	Wang (CHN); L 0–3	dos Santos (BRA); W 3–0	2 Q	—N/a	van Zon (NED); L 1–3	Did not advance		
Yoon Ji-yu; Lee Mi-gyu	Team C1-3	—N/a				Brazil (BRA); W 2–1	Croatia (CRO); W 2–0	China (CHN); L 0–2	2nd place, silver medalist(s)
Kim Seong-ok; Lee Kun-woo	Team C6-8	—N/a				France (FRA); L 0–2	Did not advance		

== Taekwondo ==
South Korea qualified one athlete. Joo Jeong-hun qualified by winning the gold medal at the 2021 Asian Qualification Tournament in Amman, Jordan.

Athlete	Event	First round	Quarterfinals	Semifinals	Repechage 1	Repechage 2	Final / BM	
Athlete	Event	Opposition Result	Opposition Result	Opposition Result	Opposition Result	Opposition Result	Opposition Result	Rank
Joo Jeong-hun	Men's –75 kg	Isaldibirov (RPC); L 31–35	Did not advance		Çelik (TUR); W 40–31	Abuzarli (AZE); W 46–32	Isaldibirov (RPC); W 24–14	3rd place, bronze medalist(s)

== Wheelchair basketball ==
South Korea's men's wheelchair basketball team qualified for the 2020 Summer Paralympics after finishing in top three at the 2019 IWBF Asia Oceania Wheelchair Basketball Championship in Pattaya, Thailand.

Roster

The following is the Republic of Korea roster in the men's wheelchair basketball tournament of the 2020 Summer Paralympics.

Republic of Korea men's national wheelchair basketball team - 2020 Summer Paralympics roster
Players
Coaches

No.	Name	Age – Date of birth	Pts.	Club	Ctr.
4	Kim Ho-yong	49 – 3 March 1972	3.0	Jeju	(South Korea)
6	Hwang Woo-sung	38 – 22 November 1982	2.0	Jeju	(South Korea)
7	Kim Tae-ok	33 – 25 August 1987	2.5	Seoul	(South Korea)
10	Oh Dong-suk	33 – 11 November 1987	2.0	Seoul	(South Korea)
11	Kwak Jun-seong	31 – 8 December 1989	1.0	Seoul	(South Korea)
12	Yang Dong-gil	29 – 11 September 1991	4.0	Seoul	(South Korea)
16	Lee Youn-joo	36 – 29 November 1984	3.5	Seoul	(South Korea)
23	Cho Seung-hyun	37 – 1 December 1983	4.0	Chuncheon	(South Korea)
24	Lee Chi-won	41 – 12 March 1980	2.5	Chuncheon	(South Korea)
39	Kim Sang-yeol	38 – 15 April 1983	4.0	Chuncheon	(South Korea)
40	Gim Dong-hyeon	32 – 24 September 1988	4.0	Jeju	(South Korea)
44	Lee Byoung-jai	40 – 13 July 1981	1.0	Chuncheon	(South Korea)

Head coach

Ko Kwang-yub

Assistant coach(es)

Kim Young-moo

Legend

- Age - describes age on 24 August 2021

Group A

Pos	Team	Pld	W	L	PF	PA	PD	Pts	Qualification
1	Spain	5	5	0	375	272	+103	10	Quarter-finals
2	Japan (H)	5	4	1	312	298	+14	9	Quarter-finals
3	Turkey	5	3	2	353	327	+26	8	Quarter-finals
4	Canada	5	2	3	307	333	−26	7	Quarter-finals
5	South Korea	5	1	4	305	332	−27	6	9th/10th place playoff
6	Colombia	5	0	5	256	346	−90	5	11th/12th place playoff

Source: TOCOG
Rules for classification: 1) Points; 2) Head-to-head results; 3) Points difference; 4) Points scored.
(H) Hosts

25 August 2021
20:30

Report

Spain	65–53	South Korea
Scoring by quarter: 16–10, 15–14, 12–16, 22–13
Pts: García 18; Rebs: García 13; Asts: García 12		Pts: Gim 24; Rebs: Gim 14; Asts: Cho 8

Musashino Forest Sport Plaza
Referees: Matias Quintana

26 August 2021
17:00

Report

South Korea	70–80	Turkey
Scoring by quarter: 15–21, 18–17, 15–19, 22–23
Pts: Cho 26; Rebs: Gim 11; Asts: Cho 8		Pts: Gürbulak 25; Rebs: Toprak 8 Asts: Gürbulak 13

Musashino Forest Sport Plaza
Attendance: 40
Referees: Tomas Pajer

27 August 2021
20:30

Report

Japan	59–52	South Korea
Scoring by quarter: 14–9, 17–12, 16–15, 12–16
Pts: Fujimoto 21; Rebs: Akita 11; Asts: Chokai 10		Pts: Cho 21; Rebs: Gim 14; Asts: Cho 6

Ariake Arena
Referees: Krunoslav Peic

28 August 2021
20:30

Report

South Korea	66–54	Colombia
Scoring by quarter: 19–10, 16–17, 18–10, 13–17
Pts: Lee C. 14; Rebs: Lee Y. 13; Asts: Oh 11		Pts: Hernandez 21; Rebs: Sanz 8 Asts: Hernandez 9

Musashino Forest Sport Plaza
Attendance: 0
Referees: Hiroki Ono

29 August 2021
17:00

Report

Canada	74–64	South Korea
Scoring by quarter: 21–17, 15–15, 17–15, 21–17
Pts: Anderson 29; Rebs: Anderson 9 Asts: Goncin 10		Pts: Cho 22; Rebs: Kim S. 9 Asts: Gim 7

Ariake Arena
Referees: Ben Wood

9th–10th classification match

2 September 2021
12:30

Report

South Korea	54–64	Iran
Scoring by quarter: 16–10, 14–16, 12–21, 12–17
Pts: Cho 17; Rebs: Gim 9 Asts: Cho 7		Pts: Sayari 26; Rebs: Sayari 11; Asts: Kamali, Tolouei Tamardash 8

Ariake Arena
Referees: Ben Wood

== Wheelchair tennis ==
South Korea qualified four player entries for wheelchair tennis. Two of them qualified through the world rankings, while two others qualified under bipartite commission invitation allocation quotas.

Athlete	Event	Round of 64	Round of 32	Round of 16	Quarterfinals	Semifinals	Final / BM	
Athlete	Event	Opposition Result	Opposition Result	Opposition Result	Opposition Result	Opposition Result	Opposition Result	Rank
Im Ho-won	Men's singles							
Oh Sang-ho	Men's singles							
Kim Kyu-seung	Quad singles	—N/a						
Kim Myung-je	Quad singles							

== See also ==
- South Korea at the Paralympics
- South Korea at the 2020 Summer Olympics
