= Table tennis at the 2024 Summer Paralympics – Men's individual – Class 2 =

Men's singles MS2 at the XVII Paralympic Games
- Venue: South Paris Arena 4, Paris
- Dates: 1 – 5 September 2024
- Competitors: 17 from 12 nations

Medalists
1st place, gold medalist(s)		Rafał Czuper	Poland
2nd place, silver medalist(s)		Jiří Suchánek	Czech Republic
3rd place, bronze medalist(s)		Cha Soo-yong	South Korea
3rd place, bronze medalist(s)		Fabien Lamirault	France

The men's singles – Class 2 tournament at the 2024 Summer Paralympics in Paris took place between 1 and 5 September 2024 at South Paris Arena 4.

== Schedule ==
The schedule are as below:

P	Preliminary round	¼	Quarter-finals	½	Semi-finals	G	Gold medal match

Events	Dates									
Events	Sun 1 Sep		Mon 2 Sep		Tue 3 Sep		Wed 4 Sep		Thu 5 Sep	
Events	M	E	M	E	M	E	M	E	M	E
Men's singles MS2		P			¼			½	G	

== Results ==
=== Medal matches ===
Semi-finals
1	Fabien Lamirault (FRA)	9	11	9	10
8	Jiří Suchánek (CZE)	11	6	11	12
4	Cha Soo-yong (KOR)	11	12	8	11
2	Rafał Czuper (POL)	3	14	11	13

Gold medal match
8	Jiří Suchánek (CZE)	6	11	8	6
2	Rafał Czuper (POL)	11	8	11	11

=== Top half ===
==== Section 1 ====
Round of 32

Round of 16
1	Fabien Lamirault (FRA)	10	11	11	11
13	Miguel Ángel Toledo (ESP)	12	6	4	9
10	Oleksandr Yezyk (UKR)	9	11	4	11	4
6	Park Jin-cheol (KOR)	11	9	11	9	11

Quarter-finals
1	Fabien Lamirault (FRA)	11	11	13
6	Park Jin-cheol (KOR)	9	9	11

==== Section 2 ====
Round of 32
17	Peter Isherwood (CAN)	5	11	7	3
14	Tomasz Jakimczuk (POL)	11	8	11	11

Round of 16
8	Jiří Suchánek (CZE)	11	13	11
14	Tomasz Jakimczuk (POL)	5	11	6
16	Ahmed Elmahsy (EGY)	7	12	10	12	8
3	Peter Lovaš (SVK)	11	10	12	10	11

Quarter-finals
8	Jiří Suchánek (CZE)	12	12	11
3	Peter Lovaš (SVK)	10	10	2

=== Bottom half ===
==== Section 3 ====
Round of 32

Round of 16
4	Cha Soo-yong (KOR)	11	11	11
11	Thirayu Chueawong (THA)	8	5	8
12	Iker Sastre (ESP)	10	4	11	9
5	Luis Flores (CHI)	12	11	4	11

Quarter-finals
4	Cha Soo-yong (KOR)	11	11	13
5	Luis Flores (CHI)	9	8	11

==== Section 4 ====
Round of 32

Round of 16
7	Martin Ludrovský (SVK)	9	11	6	7
9	Federico Crosara (ITA)	11	6	11	11
15	Julien Michaud (FRA)	5	8	7
2	Rafał Czuper (POL)	11	11	11

Quarter-finals
9	Federico Crosara (ITA)	6	14	3	4
2	Rafał Czuper (POL)	11	12	11	11
