= Table tennis at the 2020 Summer Paralympics – Men's individual – Class 2 =

Table tennis at the XVI Paralympic Games
- Venue: Tokyo Metropolitan Gymnasium
- Dates: 25–30 August 2021
- Competitors: 21 from 13 nations

Medalists
| 1st place, gold medalist(s) | | Fabien Lamirault | France |
| 2nd place, silver medalist(s) | | Rafał Czuper | Poland |
| 3rd place, bronze medalist(s) | | Cha Soo-yong | South Korea |
| 3rd place, bronze medalist(s) | | Park Jin-cheol | South Korea |

The Men's individual table tennis – Class 2 tournament at the 2020 Summer Paralympics in Tokyo took place between 25 and 30 August 2021 at Tokyo Metropolitan Gymnasium. Classes 1–5 were for athletes with a physical impairment that affected their legs, and who competed in a sitting position. The lower the number, the greater the impact the impairment was on an athlete's ability to compete.

In the preliminary stage, athletes competed in seven groups of three. Winners and runners-up of each group qualified for the knock-out stage. In this edition of the Games, no bronze medal match was held. Losers of each semifinal were automatically awarded a bronze medal.

== Results ==
All times are local time in UTC+9.

=== Preliminary round ===
The first two matches were played on 25 August, and the third on 26 August.

| Qualified for the knock-out stage |

==== Group A ====
| Seed | Athlete | Matches won | Matches lost | Games won | Games lost | Points | Rank |
|---|---|---|---|---|---|---|---|
| 1 | Fabien Lamirault (FRA) | 2 | 0 | 6 | 1 | 4 | 1 |
| 12 | Jiří Suchánek (CZE) | 1 | 1 | 4 | 3 | 3 | 2 |
| 13 | Tomasz Jakimczuk (POL) | 0 | 2 | 0 | 6 | 2 | 3 |

| Tomasz Jakimczuk (POL) | 3 | 5 | 2 |
| Fabien Lamirault (FRA) | 11 | 11 | 11 |

| Jiří Suchánek (CZE) | 6 | 4 | 11 | 3 |
| Fabien Lamirault (FRA) | 11 | 11 | 6 | 11 |

| Jiří Suchánek (CZE) | 11 | 11 | 11 |
| Tomasz Jakimczuk (POL) | 6 | 7 | 8 |

==== Group B ====
| Seed | Athlete | Matches won | Matches lost | Games won | Games lost | Points | Rank |
|---|---|---|---|---|---|---|---|
| 2 | Rafał Czuper (POL) | 2 | 0 | 6 | 0 | 4 | 1 |
| 15 | Rasul Nazirov (RPC) | 1 | 1 | 3 | 5 | 3 | 2 |
| 11 | Iker Sastre (ESP) | 0 | 2 | 2 | 6 | 2 | 3 |

| Rasul Nazirov (RPC) | 3 | 4 | 4 |
| Rafał Czuper (POL) | 11 | 11 | 11 |

| Iker Sastre (ESP) | 6 | 9 | 6 |
| Rafał Czuper (POL) | 11 | 11 | 11 |

| Iker Sastre (ESP) | 11 | 11 | 8 | 11 | 12 |
| Rasul Nazirov (RPC) | 9 | 4 | 11 | 13 | 14 |

==== Group C ====
| Seed | Athlete | Matches won | Matches lost | Games won | Games lost | Points | Rank |
|---|---|---|---|---|---|---|---|
| 3 | Park Jin-cheol (KOR) | 2 | 0 | 6 | 0 | 4 | 1 |
| 10 | Goran Perlic (SRB) | 1 | 1 | 3 | 5 | 3 | 2 |
| 14 | Víctor Reyes (MEX) | 0 | 2 | 2 | 6 | 2 | 3 |

| Víctor Reyes (MEX) | 3 | 11 | 9 |
| Park Jin-cheol (KOR) | 11 | 13 | 11 |

| Goran Perlic (SRB) | 7 | 4 | 6 |
| Park Jin-cheol (KOR) | 11 | 11 | 11 |

| Goran Perlic (SRB) | 11 | 8 | 11 | 9 | 11 |
| Víctor Reyes (MEX) | 8 | 11 | 3 | 11 | 6 |

==== Group D ====
| Seed | Athlete | Matches won | Matches lost | Games won | Games lost | Points | Rank |
|---|---|---|---|---|---|---|---|
| 4 | Soo Yong Cha (KOR) | 2 | 0 | 6 | 2 | 4 | 1 |
| 8 | Ján Riapoš (SVK) | 1 | 1 | 3 | 3 | 3 | 2 |
| 16 | Nobuhiro Minami (JPN) | 0 | 2 | 2 | 6 | 2 | 3 |

| Nobuhiro Minami (JPN) | 9 | 11 | 11 | 7 | 10 |
| Soo Yong Cha (KOR) | 11 | 7 | 8 | 11 | 12 |

| Ján Riapoš (SVK) | 11 | 10 | 10 |
| Soo Yong Cha (KOR) | 13 | 12 | 12 |

| Ján Riapoš (SVK) | 11 | 11 | 11 |
| Nobuhiro Minami (JPN) | 9 | 3 | 3 |

==== Group E ====
| Seed | Athlete | Matches won | Matches lost | Games won | Games lost | Points | Rank |
|---|---|---|---|---|---|---|---|
| 5 | Stephane Molliens (FRA) | 2 | 0 | 6 | 2 | 4 | 1 |
| 7 | Oleksandr Yezyk (UKR) | 1 | 1 | 3 | 5 | 3 | 2 |
| 17 | Miguel Toledo Bachiller (ESP) | 0 | 2 | 4 | 6 | 2 | 3 |

| Miguel Toledo Bachiller (ESP) | 6 | 11 | 11 | 8 | 8 |
| Stephane Molliens (FRA) | 11 | 9 | 7 | 11 | 11 |

| Oleksandr Yezyk (UKR) | 10 | 10 | 1 |
| Stephane Molliens (FRA) | 12 | 12 | 11 |

| Oleksandr Yezyk (UKR) | 11 | 11 | 5 | 6 | 11 |
| Miguel Toledo Bachiller (ESP) | 6 | 3 | 11 | 11 | 5 |

==== Group F ====
| Seed | Athlete | Matches won | Matches lost | Games won | Games lost | Points | Rank |
|---|---|---|---|---|---|---|---|
| 9 | Luis Flores (CHI) | 2 | 0 | 6 | 4 | 4 | 1 |
| 6 | Martin Ludrovský (SVK) | 1 | 1 | 3 | 3 | 3 | 2 |
| 18 | Thirayu Chueawong (THA) | 0 | 2 | 3 | 6 | 2 | 3 |

| Thirayu Chueawong (THA) | 7 | 11 | 9 | 8 |
| Martin Ludrovský (SVK) | 11 | 8 | 11 | 11 |

| Luis Flores (CHI) | 11 | 11 | 8 | 8 | 11 |
| Martin Ludrovský (SVK) | 3 | 8 | 11 | 11 | 8 |

| Luis Flores (CHI) | 11 | 10 | 7 | 11 | 11 |
| Thirayu Chueawong (THA) | 8 | 12 | 11 | 5 | 6 |

=== Knockout stage ===
Round of 16
C2 | Goran Perlic (SRB) | 12 | 5 | 9 | 13 | 11
B2 | Rasul Nazirov (RPC) | 10 | 11 | 11 | 11 | 13
F1 | Luis Flores (CHI) | 11 | 6 | 4 | 11 | 5
E2 | Oleksandr Yezyk (UKR) | 4 | 11 | 11 | 7 | 11
F2 | Martin Ludrovský (SVK) | 11 | 10 | 11 | 12
E1 | Stephane Molliens (FRA) | 1 | 12 | 9 | 10
A2 | Jiří Suchánek (CZE) | 7 | 11 | 9 | 11 | 11
D2 | Ján Riapoš (SVK) | 11 | 9 | 11 | 5 | 4

Quarter-finals
A1 | Fabien Lamirault (FRA) | 11 | 11 | 11
B2 | Rasul Nazirov (RPC) | 4 | 3 | 5
E2 | Oleksandr Yezyk (UKR) | 11 | 6 | 14 | 10
D1 | Soo Yong Cha (KOR) | 8 | 11 | 16 | 12
C1 | Park Jin-cheol (KOR) | 12 | 11 | 9 | 11 | 11
F2 | Martin Ludrovský (SVK) | 14 | 9 | 11 | 6 | 6
A2 | Jiří Suchánek (CZE) | 6 | 4 | 11 | 9
B1 | Rafał Czuper (POL) | 11 | 11 | 9 | 11

Semi-finals
A1 | Fabien Lamirault (FRA) | 11 | 11 | 10 | 11
D1 | Soo Yong Cha (KOR) (bronze) | 7 | 4 | 12 | 8
C1 | Park Jin-cheol (KOR) (bronze) | 2 | 11 | 8 | 9
B1 | Rafał Czuper (POL) | 11 | 4 | 11 | 11

Gold medal match
A1 | Fabien Lamirault (FRA) (gold) | 11 | 12 | 11 | 7 | 11
B1 | Rafał Czuper (POL) (silver) | 6 | 14 | 5 | 11 | 9
