= Table tennis at the 2016 Summer Paralympics – Men's individual – Class 2 =

Table tennis at the XV Paralympic Games
- Venue: Riocentro Pavilion 3
- Dates: 8–13 September 2016
- Competitors: 15 from 10 nations

Medalists
1st place, gold medalist(s)		Fabien Lamirault	France
2nd place, silver medalist(s)		Rafał Czuper	Poland
3rd place, bronze medalist(s)		Jiří Suchánek	Czech Republic

The men's individual table tennis – Class 2 tournament at the 2016 Summer Paralympics in Rio de Janeiro took place during 8–13 September 2016 at Riocentro Pavilion 3. Classes 1–5 were for athletes with a physical impairment that affected their legs, and who competed in a sitting position. The lower the number, the greater the impact the impairment was on an athlete's ability to compete.

In the preliminary stage, athletes competed in five groups of three. Winners and runners-up of each group qualified to the next stage.

== Results ==
All times are local time in UTC-3.

=== Main bracket ===
==== Final rounds ====
Semifinals
Fabien Lamirault (FRA)	11	11	12	11
Jiří Suchánek (CZE)	8	9	14	1
Stephane Molliens (FRA)	11	4	10	10
Rafał Czuper (POL)	8	11	12	12

Final
Fabien Lamirault (FRA)	11	5	11	11
Rafał Czuper (POL)	6	11	8	9
Bronze medal match
Jiří Suchánek (CZE)	11	11	7	11
Stephane Molliens (FRA)	6	6	11	7

==== Top half ====
Round of 16							Quarter-finals							Semi-finals
							A1	Fabien Lamirault (FRA)	8	11	11	11
B2	Gao Yanming (CHN)	11	8	12	8	11	B2	Gao Yanming (CHN)	11	3	6	7
D2	Cha Soo-yong (KOR)	6	11	10	11	4								A1	Fabien Lamirault (FRA)	11	11	12	11
														E2	Jiří Suchánek (CZE)	8	9	14	1
							E2	Jiří Suchánek (CZE)	9	5	11	11	11
							C1	Ján Riapoš (SVK)	11	11	8	8	4

==== Bottom half ====
Round of 16						Quarter-finals							Semi-finals
						D1	Stephane Molliens (FRA)	7	12	11	11	11
						E1	Oleksandr Yezyk (UKR)	11	14	4	5	7
													D1	Stephane Molliens (FRA)	11	4	10	10
A2	Martin Ludrovský (SVK)	11	9	11	11								B1	Rafał Czuper (POL)	8	11	12	12
C2	Kim Kyung-mook (KOR)	7	11	7	4	A2	Martin Ludrovský (SVK)	4	4	9
						B1	Rafał Czuper (POL)	11	11	11

=== Preliminary round ===
- Qualified for the knock-out stage

==== Group A ====
Rank	Athlete	Won	Lost	Points diff
1 Q	Fabien Lamirault (FRA)	2	0	+22
2 Q	Martin Ludrovský (SVK)	1	1	-8
3	Goran Perlic (SRB)	0	2	-14

8 September, 10:00

Fabien Lamirault (FRA)	13	8	14	11
Goran Perlic (SRB)	11	11	12	2

9 September, 09:20

Fabien Lamirault (FRA)	11	11	11
Martin Ludrovský (SVK)	8	5	8

9 September, 15:00

Martin Ludrovský (SVK)	11	4	12	11
Goran Perlic (SRB)	6	11	10	7

==== Group B ====
Rank	Athlete	Won	Lost	Points diff
1 Q	Rafał Czuper (POL)	2	0	+35
2 Q	Gao Yanming (CHN)	1	1	-9
3	Iranildo Conceição Espíndola (BRA)	0	2	-26

8 September, 10:00

Rafał Czuper (POL)	11	11	12
Iranildo Conceição Espindola (BRA)	3	4	10

9 September, 10:00

Rafał Czuper (POL)	11	11	11
Gao Yanming (CHN)	2	7	6

9 September, 15:00

Gao Yanming (CHN)	11	9	10	14	11
Iranildo Conceição Espíndola (BRA)	6	11	12	12	5

==== Group C ====
Rank	Athlete	Won	Lost	Points diff
1 Q	Ján Riapoš (SVK)	2	0	+28
2 Q	Kim Kyung-mook (KOR)	1	1	-5
3	Guilherme Marcião da Costa (BRA)	0	2	-23

8 September, 10:40

Ján Riapoš (SVK)	11	11	11
Guilherme Marcião da Costa (BRA)	7	4	8

9 September, 10:00

Ján Riapoš (SVK)	11	11	9	11
Kim Kyung-mook (KOR)	3	6	11	8

9 September, 15:00

Kim Kyung-mook (KOR)	11	11	11
Guilherme Marcião da Costa (BRA)	7	9	8

==== Group D ====
Rank	Athlete	Won	Lost	Points diff
1 Q	Stephane Molliens (FRA)	2	0	+16
2 Q	Cha Soo-yong (KOR)	1	1	+1
3	Rastislav Revucky (SVK)	0	2	-17

8 September, 10:40

Stephane Molliens (FRA)	11	11	11
Rastislav Revucky (SVK)	9	8	6

9 September, 10:00

Stephane Molliens (FRA)	11	11	6	11
Cha Soo-yong (KOR)	5	9	11	8

9 September, 15:00

Cha Soo-yong (KOR)	5	9	11	11	11
Rastislav Revucky (SVK)	11	11	5	5	8

==== Group E ====
Rank	Athlete	Won	Lost	Points diff
1 Q	Oleksandr Yezyk (UKR)	2	0	+18
2 Q	Jiří Suchánek (CZE)	1	1	+8
3	Giuseppe Vella (ITA)	0	2	-26

8 September, 10:40

Oleksandr Yezyk (UKR)	12	13	11
Giuseppe Vella (ITA)	10	11	2

9 September, 10:00

Oleksandr Yezyk (UKR)	11	8	15	11
Jiří Suchánek (CZE)	8	11	13	8

9 September, 15:40

Jiří Suchánek (CZE)	11	11	11	11
Giuseppe Vella (ITA)	8	2	13	8
