= Table tennis at the 2024 Summer Paralympics – Men's doubles MD4 =

Men's doubles MD4 at the XVII Paralympic Games
- Venue: South Paris Arena 4, Paris
- Dates: 29 – 31 August 2024
- Competitors: 18 from 9 nations

Medalists
1st place, gold medalist(s)		Peter Lovas; Ján Riapoš	Slovakia
2nd place, silver medalist(s)		Jang Yeong-jin; Park Sung-joo	South Korea
3rd place, bronze medalist(s)		Fabien Lamirault; Julien Michaud	France
3rd place, bronze medalist(s)		Cha Soo-yong; Park Jin-cheol	South Korea

The men's doubles – Class 4 tournament at the 2024 Summer Paralympics in Paris will take place between 29 and 31 August 2024 at South Paris Arena 4.

== Schedule ==
The schedule are as below:

P	Preliminary round	¼	Quarter-finals	½	Semi-finals	G	Gold medal match

Events	Dates						
Events	Thu 29 Aug			Fri 30 Aug		Sat 31 Aug	
Events	M		E	M	E	M	E
Men's doubles MD4	P	¼			½		G

== Results ==
=== Gold medal match ===
Gold medal match
1	Jang Y-j (KOR); Park S-j (KOR)	10	11	7	8
5	P Lovas (SVK); J Riapoš (SVK)	12	7	11	11

=== Top half ===
Round of 16
6	R Czuper (POL); T Jakimczuk (POL)	11	11	11
9	K Ramadan (EGY); E Raslan (EGY)	9	7	4

Quarter-finals
1	Jang Y-j (KOR); Park S-j (KOR)	11	11	11
8	R Davies (GBR); T Matthews (GBR)	5	6	4
6	R Czuper (POL); T Jakimczuk (POL)	3	11	12	11	9
4	F Lamirault (FRA); J Michaud (FRA)	11	7	14	7	11

Semi-finals
1	Jang Y-j (KOR); Park S-j (KOR)	11	9	11	11
4	F Lamirault (FRA); J Michaud (FRA)	8	11	6	6

=== Bottom half ===
Round of 16

Quarter-finals
3	I Sastre (ESP); M Á Toledo (ESP)	3	12	11	12	8
5	P Lovas (SVK); J Riapoš (SVK)	11	10	7	14	11
7	F Crosara (ITA); F Falco (ITA)	11	4	8
2	Cha S-y (KOR); Park J-c (KOR)	13	11	11

Semi-finals
5	P Lovas (SVK); J Riapoš (SVK)	10	11	11	7	12
2	Cha S-y (KOR); Park J-c (KOR)	12	7	8	11	10
