= Mlékojedy =

- Municipality
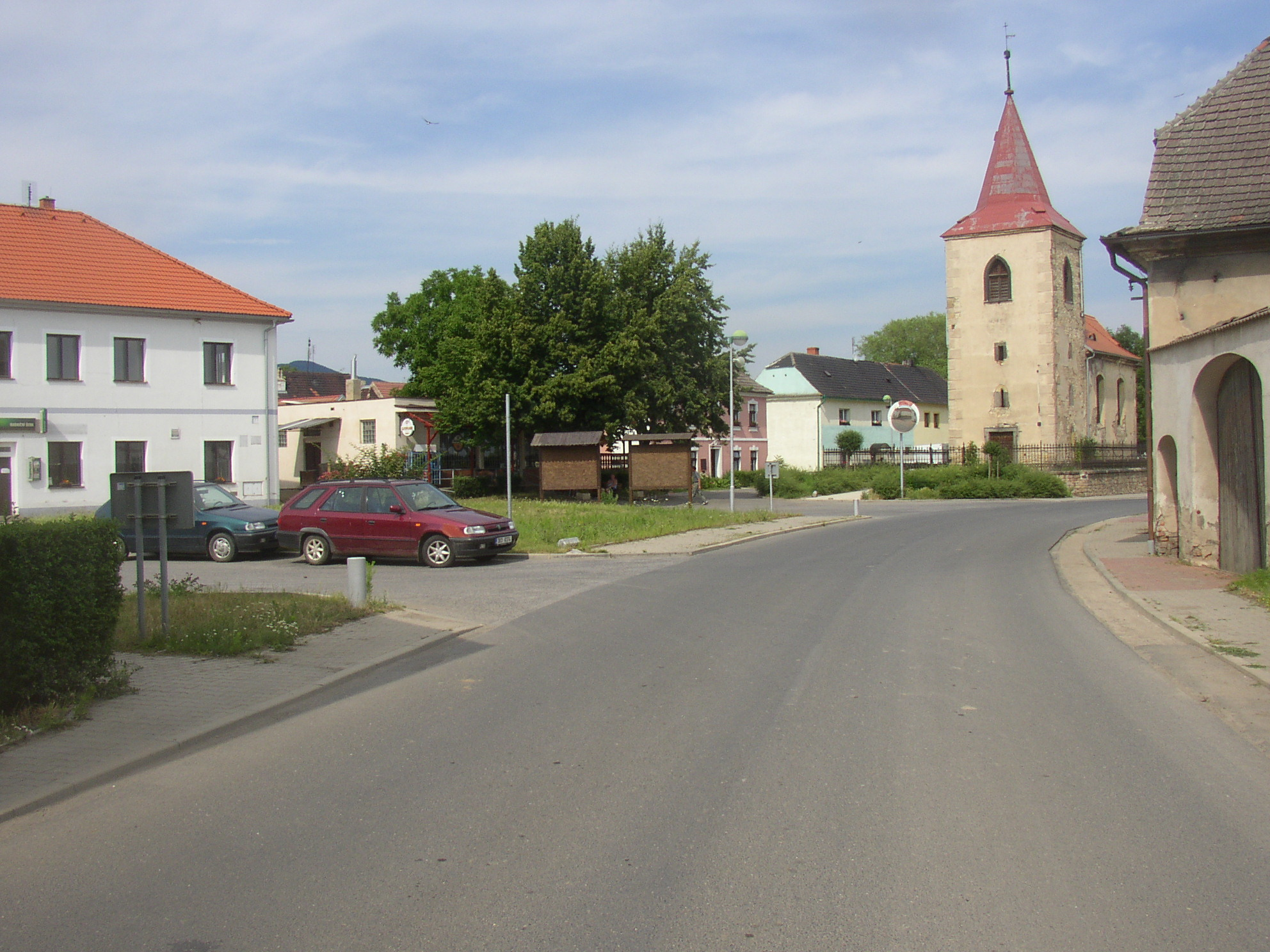
- Common with the Church of Saint Martin

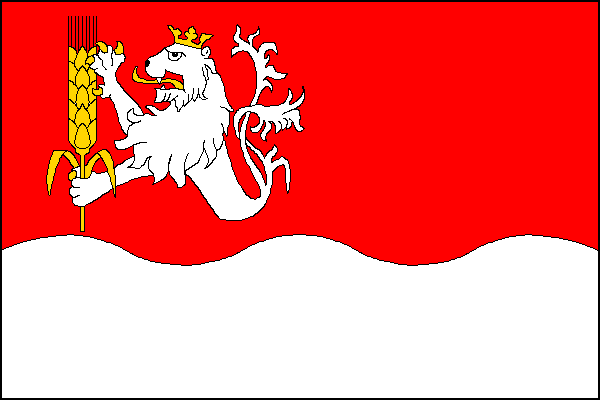
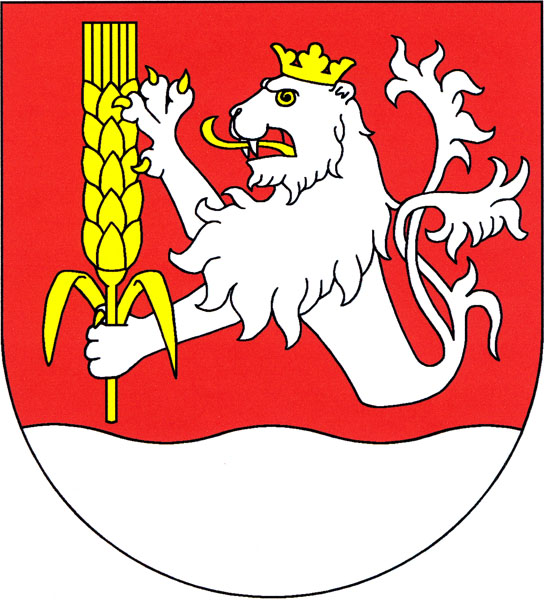
- Flag Coat of arms

- Location in the Czech Republic
- Coordinates: 50°31′37″N 14°7′10″E
- Country: Czech Republic
- Region: Ústí nad Labem
- District: Litoměřice
- First mentioned: 1352

Area
  - Total: 2.83 km^{2} (1.09 sq mi)
- Elevation: 146 m (479 ft)

Population (2026-01-01)
  - Total: 246
  - Density: 86.9/km^{2} (225/sq mi)
- Time zone: UTC+1 (CET)
  - Summer (DST): UTC+2 (CEST)
- Postal code: 412 01
- Website: www.mlekojedy.cz

Mlékojedy (until 1946 Německé Mlékojedy; German: Deutsch Mlikojed) is a municipality and village in Litoměřice District in the Ústí nad Labem Region of the Czech Republic. It has about 200 inhabitants.

Mlékojedy lies approximately 16 km (10 mi) south of Ústí nad Labem and 54 km (34 mi) north-west of Prague.

== Demographics ==
Historical population
Year	Pop.	±%
1869	348	—
1880	393	+12.9%
1890	409	+4.1%
1900	458	+12.0%
1910	461	+0.7%
1921	450	−2.4%
1930	474	+5.3%
1950	300	−36.7%
1961	284	−5.3%
1970	267	−6.0%
1980	228	−14.6%
1991	161	−29.4%
2001	183	+13.7%
2011	214	+16.9%
2021	232	+8.4%
Source: Censuses

== Notable people ==
- Jiří Suchánek (born 1982), para table tennis player
