= Boccia at the 2024 Summer Paralympics – Men's individual BC1 =

Boccia – Men's individual BC1 at the XVII Paralympic Games
- Venue: South Paris Arena
- Date: 29 August - 2 September 2024
- Competitors: 12 from 11 nations

Medalists
1st place, gold medalist(s)		John Loung	Hong Kong
2nd place, silver medalist(s)		Jung Sungjoon	South Korea
3rd place, bronze medalist(s)		Muhamad Afrizal Syafa	Indonesia

The men's individual BC1 boccia event at the 2024 Summer Paralympics is being contested between 28 August and 2 September 2024 at the South Paris Arena.

The event structure begins with pool stages. The top two players from each of four pools then entered into a quarter-final single-elimination stage, with the losing semifinalists playing off for bronze.

== Classification ==
The BC1 classification is described as follows:

BC1M/F – Players in this class throw the ball with the hand or foot. They may compete with an assistant who stays outside the competitor's playing box, to stabilize or adjust their playing chair and give the ball to the player when requested.

== Results ==
=== Pool stages ===
The pool stage will be played between 29 and 31 August 2024. The top two players in each pool will qualify to the quarterfinals.

==== Pool A ====
Pos	Player	Pld	W	D	L	PF	PA	PD	Pts	Qualification	(United Kingdom)	(Netherlands)	(Brazil)
1	David Smith (GBR) Q	2	2	0	0	9	3	+6	4	Qualification for quarterfinal	—	5–2	4–1
2	Daniel Perez (NED) Q	2	1	0	1	7	9	−2	2	Qualification for quarterfinal	1–4	—	6–5
3	Jose Carlos Chagas (BRA)	2	0	0	2	7	11	−4	0	Eliminated	2–5	5–6	—

Updated to match(es) played on 29 August 2024. Source: Paris 2024

Matches
Pool A

Match A1: David Smith (GBR) v Jose Carlos Chagas (BRA)
Player/End	1	2	3	4	Result	Report
(United Kingdom) David Smith	1	2	0	2	5	Report
(Brazil) José Carlos Chagas de Oliveira	0	0	2	0	2	Report
Match A2: David Smith (GBR) v Daniel Perez (NED)
Player/End	1	2	3	4	Result	Report
(United Kingdom) David Smith	1	1	0	2	4	Report
(Netherlands) Daniel Perez	0	0	1	0	1	Report
Match A3: Jose Carlos Chagas (BRA)v Daniel Perez (NED)
Player/End	1	2	3	4	Result	Report
(Brazil) José Carlos Chagas de Oliveira	0	5	0	0	5	Report
(Netherlands) Daniel Perez	1	0	3	2	6	Report

==== Pool B ====
Pos	Player	Pld	W	D	L	PF	PA	PD	Pts	Qualification	(Indonesia)	(Slovakia)	(South Korea)
1	Muhamad Afrizal Syafa (INA) Q	2	2	0	0	12	7	+5	4	Qualification for quarterfinal	—	5–3	7–4
2	Tomáš Král (SVK) Q	2	1	0	1	7	7	0	2	Qualification for quarterfinal	3–5	—	4–2
3	Kim Dohyun (KOR)	2	0	0	2	6	11	−5	0	Eliminated	4–7	2–4	—

Updated to match(es) played on 27 August 2024. Source: Paris 2024

Matches
Pool B

Match B1: Muhamad Afrizal Syafa (INA) v Tomáš Král (SVK)
Player/End	1	2	3	4	Result	Report
(Indonesia) Muhamad Afrizal Syafa	1	4	0	0	5	Report
(Slovakia) Tomáš Král	0	0	2	1	3	Report
Match B2: Tomáš Král (SVK) v Kim Dohyun (KOR)
Player/End	1	2	3	4	Result	Report
(Slovakia) Tomáš Král	0	3	0	1	4	Report
(South Korea) Kim Dohyun	1	0	1	0	2	Report
Match B3: Kim Dohyun (KOR)v Muhamad Afrizal Syafa (INA)
Player/End	1	2	3	4	Result	Report
(South Korea) Kim Dohyun	0	0	2	2	4	Report
(Indonesia) Muhamad Afrizal Syafa	2	5	0	0	7	Report

==== Pool C ====
Pos	Player	Pld	W	D	L	PF	PA	PD	Pts	Qualification	(Thailand)	(South Korea)	(Mexico)
1	Witsanu Huadpradit (THA) Q	2	2	0	0	11	6	+5	4	Qualification for quarterfinal	—	7–3	4–3
2	Jung Sungjoon (KOR) Q	2	1	0	1	6	10	−4	2	Qualification for quarterfinal	3–7	—	3^{(TB)}-3
3	Eduardo Sanchez (MEX)	2	0	0	2	6	7	−1	0	Eliminated	3–4	3–3^{(TB)}	—

Updated to match(es) played on 31 August 2024. Source: Paris 2024

Matches
Pool C

Match C1: Witsanu Huadpradit (THA) v Jung Sungjoon (KOR)
Player/End	1	2	3	4	Result	Report
(Thailand) Witsanu Huadpradit	0	6	0	1	7	Report
(South Korea) Jung Sungjoon	2	0	1	0	3	Report
Match C2: Eduardo Sanchez (MEX) v Jung Sungjoon (KOR)
Player/End	1	2	3	4	Result	Report
(Mexico) Eduardo Sanchez Reyes	2	1	0	0	3	Report
(South Korea) Jung Sungjoon	0	0	2	1	3^{(TB)}	Report
Match C3 Witsanu Huadpradit (THA) v Eduardo Sanchez (MEX)
Player/End	1	2	3	4	Result	Report
(Thailand) Witsanu Huadpradit	1	1	2	0	4	Report
(Mexico) Eduardo Sanchez Reyez	1	0	0	2	3	Report

TB : Won on tie break

==== Pool D ====
Pos	Player	Pld	W	D	L	PF	PA	PD	Pts	Qualification	(Portugal)	(Hong Kong)	(Canada)
1	Andre Ramos (POR) Q	2	2	0	0	14	6	+8	4	Qualification for quarterfinal	—	7–6	7–0
2	John Loung (HKG) Q	2	1	0	1	11	8	+3	2	Qualification for quarterfinal	6–7	—	5–1
3	Lance Cryderman (CAN)	2	0	0	2	1	12	−11	0	Eliminated	0–7	1–5	—

Updated to match(es) played on 31 August 2024. Source: Paris 2024

1Matches
Pool D

Match D1: Lance Cryderman (CAN) v Andre Ramos (POR)
Player/End	1	2	3	4	Result	Report
(Canada) Lance Cryderman	0	0	0	0	0	Report
(Portugal) Andre Ramos	2	2	1	2	7	Report
Match D2: Andre Ramos (POR) v John Loung (HKG)
Player/End	1	2	3	4	Result	Report
(Portugal) Andre Ramos	0	0	3	4	7	Report
(Hong Kong) John Loung	5	1	0	0	6	Report
Match D3: John Loung (HKG) v Lance Cryderman (CAN)
Player/End	1	2	3	4	Result	Report
(Hong Kong) John Loung	2	0	1	2	5	Report
(Canada) Lance Cryderman	0	1	0	0	1	Report

=== Elimination stage ===
The final stage (or knockout stage) will be played between 1 August and 2 September.

Quarter-finals
1 September, South Paris Arena
David Smith (GBR)	6
Tomáš Král (SVK)	1
1 September, South Paris Arena
Andre Ramos (POR)	2
Jung Sungjoon (KOR)	3
1 September, South Paris Arena
Muhamad Afrizal Syafa (INA)	10
Daniel Perez (NED)	0
1 September, South Paris Arena
W Huadpradit (THA)	3
John Loung (HKG)	5

Semi-finals
1 September, South Paris Arena
David Smith (GBR)	3
Jung Sungjoon (KOR)	4
1 September, South Paris Arena
Muhamad Afrizal Syafa (INA)	3
John Loung (HKG)	4

Final
2 September, South Paris Arena
Jung Sungjoon (KOR)	1
John Loung (HKG)	4
Bronze medal
2 September, South Paris Arena
David Smith (GBR)	3
Muhamad Afrizal Syafa (INA)	5

Elimination Matches

Quarterfinals

Match QF1:
Player/End	1	2	3	4	Result	Report
David Smith (GBR)	1	3	2	0	6	Report
Tomáš Král (SVK)	0	0	0	1	1	Report
Match QF2:
Player/End	1	2	3	4	Result	Report
Andre Ramos (POR)	1	1	0	0	2	Report
Jung Sungjoon (KOR)	0	0	1	2	3	Report
Match QF3:
Player/End	1	2	3	4	Result	Report
Muhamad Afrizal Syafa (INA)	2	4	1	3	10	Report
Daniel Perez (NED)	0	0	0	0	0	Report
Match QF4:
Player/End	1	2	3	4	Result	Report
W Huadpradit (THA)	0	3	0	0	3	Report
John Loung (HKG)	3	0	1	1	5	Report

Semifinals

Match SF1:
Player/End	1	2	3	4	Result	Report
David Smith (GBR)	3	0	0	0	3	Report
Jung Sungjoon (KOR)	0	1	1	2	4	Report
Match SF2:
Player/End	1	2	3	4	Result	Report
Muhamad Afrizal Syafa (INA)	0	1	0	2	3	Report
John Loung (HKG)	1	1	2	0	4	Report

Finals

Bronze medal match:
Player/End	1	2	3	4	Result	Report
David Smith (GBR)	3	0	0	0	3	Report
Muhamad Afrizal Syafa (INA)	0	3	1	1	5	Report
Gold medal match:
Player/End	1	2	3	4	Result	Report
Jung Sungjoon (KOR)	0	0	0	1	1	Report
John Loung (HKG)	2	1	1	0	4	Report
