= Chlumín =

- Municipality
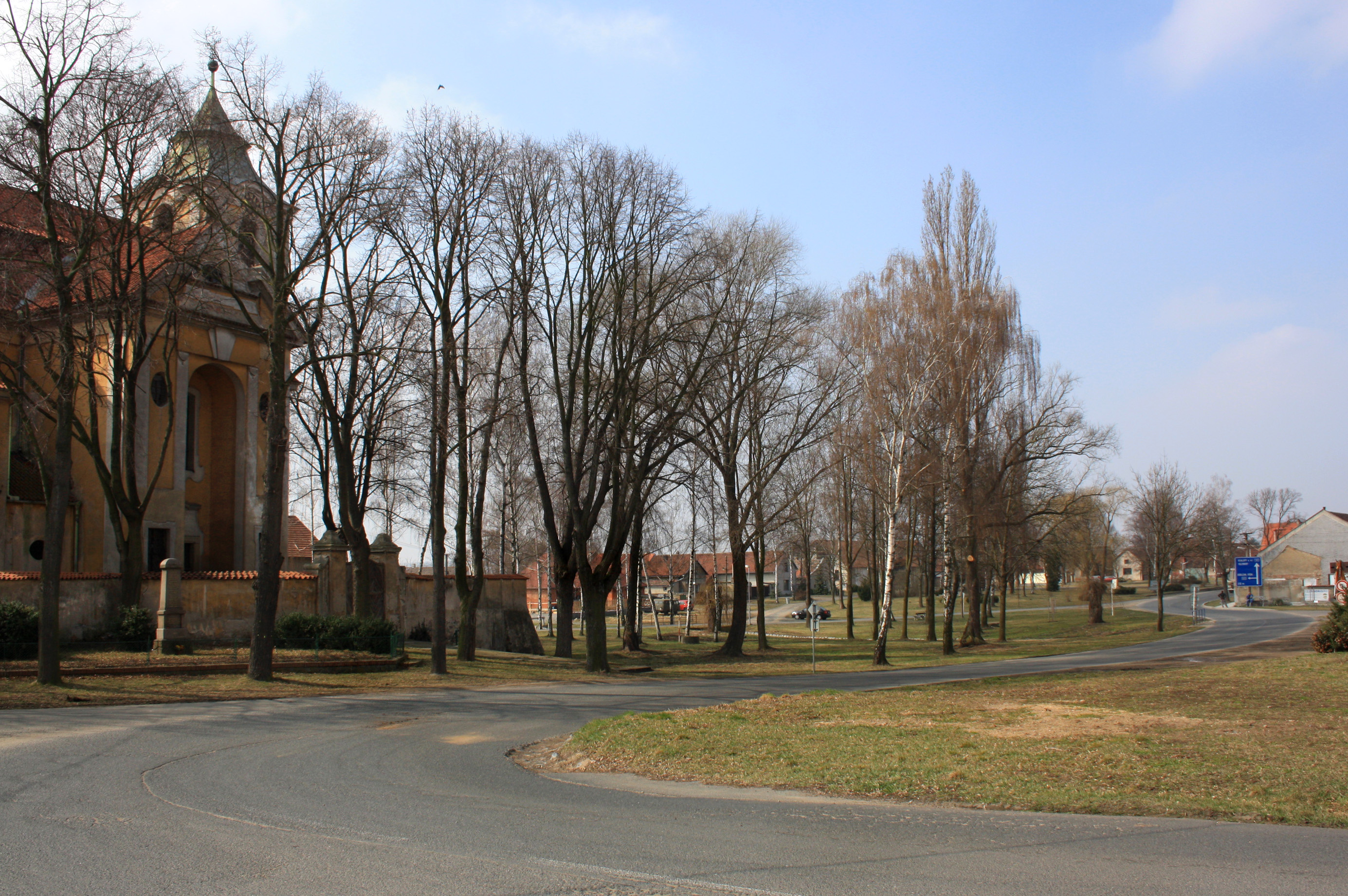
- Centre of Chlumín

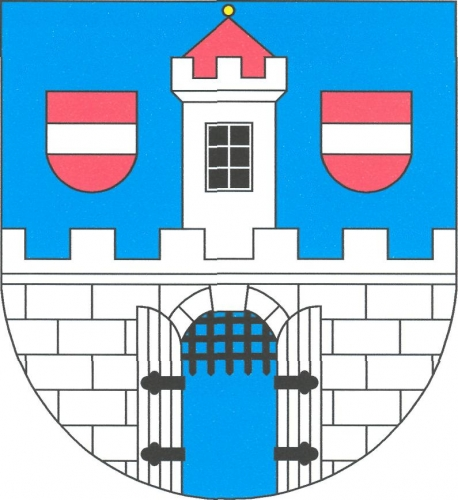
- Flag Coat of arms

- Location in the Czech Republic
- Coordinates: 50°17′21″N 14°26′58″E
- Country: Czech Republic
- Region: Central Bohemian
- District: Mělník
- First mentioned: 1336

Area
  - Total: 6.40 km^{2} (2.47 sq mi)
- Elevation: 165 m (541 ft)

Population (2026-01-01)
  - Total: 482
  - Density: 75.3/km^{2} (195/sq mi)
- Time zone: UTC+1 (CET)
  - Summer (DST): UTC+2 (CEST)
- Postal code: 277 43
- Website: www.chlumin.cz

Chlumín is a municipality and village in Mělník District in the Central Bohemian Region of the Czech Republic. It has about 500 inhabitants.

== Demographics ==
Historical population
Year	Pop.	±%
1869	648	—
1880	662	+2.2%
1890	612	−7.6%
1900	671	+9.6%
1910	703	+4.8%
1921	675	−4.0%
1930	603	−10.7%
1950	508	−15.8%
1961	481	−5.3%
1970	420	−12.7%
1980	407	−3.1%
1991	401	−1.5%
2001	407	+1.5%
2011	451	+10.8%
2021	462	+2.4%
Source: Censuses
