= John Loung =

Hong Kong boccia player

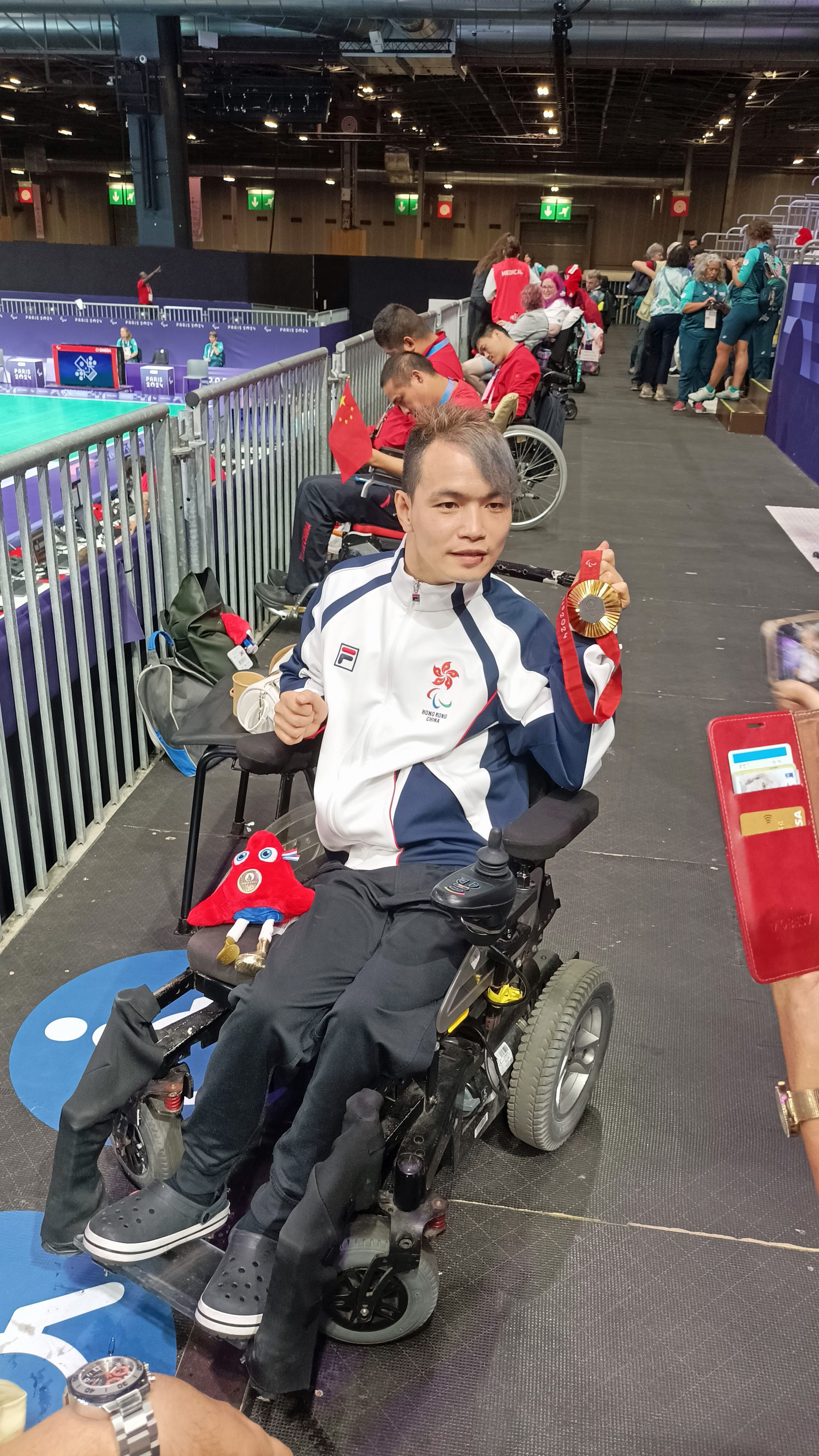
- medalled at the 2024 Paralympics

Personal information
- Born: 5 May 1986 (age 40)

Sport
- Country: Hong Kong
- Sport: Boccia
- Disability class: BC1
Medal record
Boccia
Representing Hong Kong
Paralympic Games
Gold medal – first place	2024 Paris	Individual BC1
Asian Para Games
Silver medal – second place	2018 Jakarta	Team BC1–2

John Loung (Chinese: 龍子健; born 5 May 1986) is a Hong Kong boccia player. He represented Hong Kong at the 2024 Summer Paralympics.

== Career ==
Loung represented Hong Kong at the 2024 Summer Paralympics and won the gold medal in the individual BC1 event.
