= Jiří Suchánek =

Czech para table tennis player

Personal information
- Nickname: Suchy
- Born: 9 May 1982 (age 44) Mlékojedy, Czechoslovakia
- Home town: Liberec, Czech Republic
- Height: 180 cm (5 ft 11 in)

Sport
- Country: Czech Republic
- Sport: Para table tennis
- Disability: Spinal cord injury
- Disability class: C2
Medal record
Para table tennis
Representing Czech Republic
Paralympic Games
Bronze medal – third place	2016 Rio de Janeiro	Men's singles C2
Silver medal – second place	2024 Paris	Men's singles C2
World Championships
Bronze medal – third place	2018 Laško	Men's singles C2
European Championships
Silver medal – second place	2009 Genoa	Men's teams C5
Silver medal – second place	2013 Lignano	Men's singles C2
Silver medal – second place	2017 Laško	Men's teams C2
Bronze medal – third place	2017 Laško	Men's singles C2
Bronze medal – third place	2019 Helsingborg	Men's singles C2

Jiří Suchánek (born 9 May 1982) is a Czech para table tennis player who competes in international level events. He is a World and Paralympic bronze medalist and a five-time European medalist.

Suchánek was involved in a serious car accident in 1999 when the car that he was driving crashed into another car that was driven by a driver who was under the influence of alcohol and was unlicensed, the other driver was killed at the scene. This led to him paralysed from the 5th and 6th cervical vertebrae, he spent nine months in a specialist hospital in Chlumín, he got involved in para table tennis in 2005 and competed internationally two years later in 2007.
