= Jung Sung-joon =

South Korean boccia player

Personal information
- Born: 5 March 1978 (age 48)
- Home town: Ansan, South Korea

Sport
- Country: South Korea
- Sport: Boccia
- Disability class: BC1
Medal record
Boccia
Representing South Korea
Paralympic Games
Silver medal – second place	2024 Paris	Individual BC1
Asian Para Games
Silver medal – second place	2018 Jakarta	Individual BC1

Jung Sung-joon (born 5 March 1978) is a South Korean boccia player. He represented South Korea at the 2024 Summer Paralympics.

== Career ==
Sung-joon represented South Korea at the 2024 Summer Paralympics and advanced to the gold medal match in the individual BC1 event.
