= Julien Michaud =

French para table tennis player

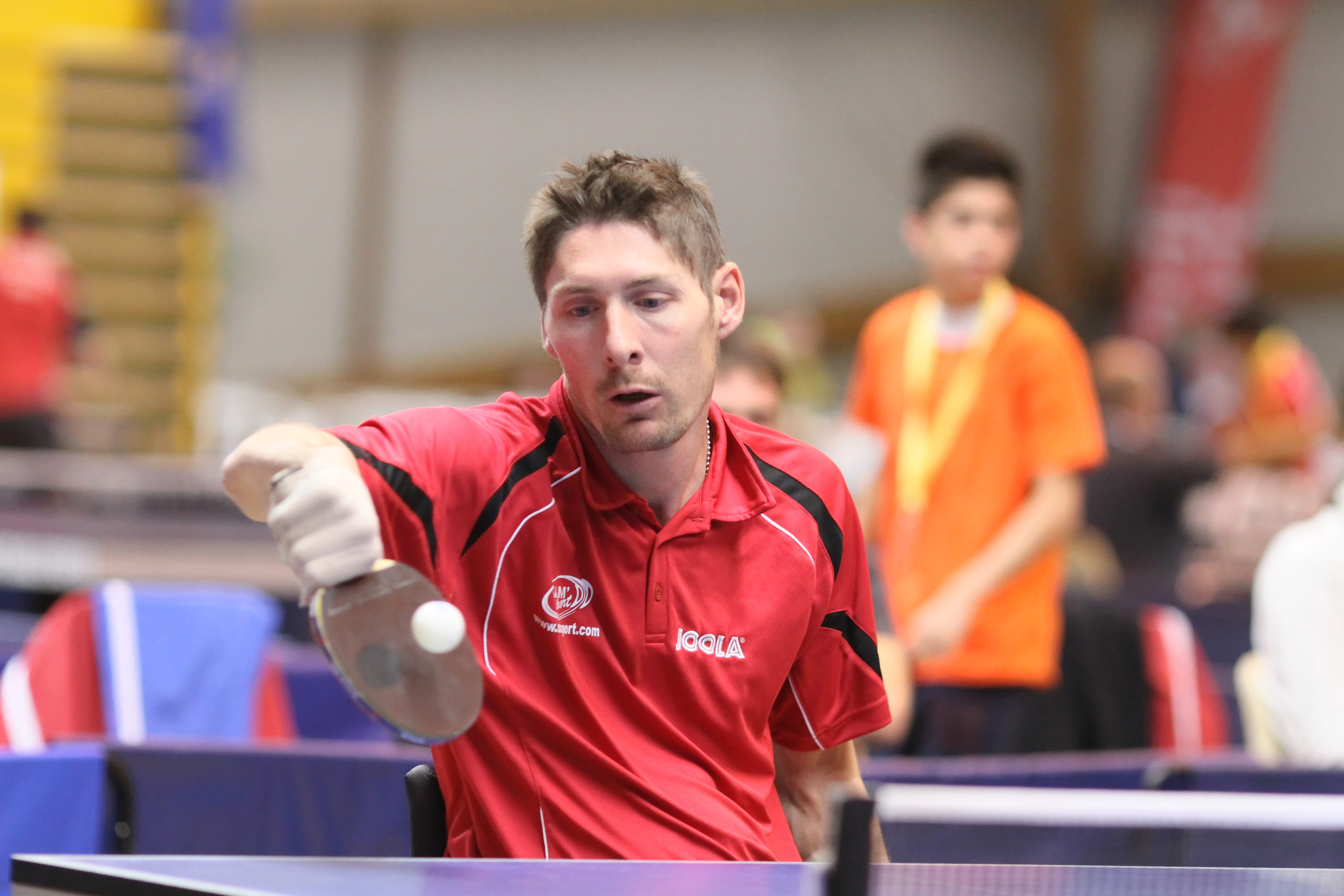
- Julien Michau

Personal information
- Born: 1 September 1979 (age 46) Besançon, France

Sport
- Sport: Para table tennis
- Disability class: C2
Medal record
Para table tennis
Representing France
Paralympic Games
Bronze medal – third place	2024 Paris	Men's doubles MD4

Julien Michaud (born 1 September 1979) is a French para table tennis player. He represented France at the 2024 Summer Paralympics.

== Career ==
Michaud represented France at the 2024 Summer Paralympics in the men's doubles MD4 event, along with Fabien Lamirault, and won a bronze medal.
