= Boris Trávníček =

Slovak para table tennis player

Personal information
- Born: 19 May 1998 (age 28) Vyškov, Czech Republic
- Height: 1.67 m (5 ft 6 in)

Sport
- Country: Slovakia
- Sport: Para table tennis
- Disability: Spinal cord injury
- Disability class: C4
Medal record
Para table tennis
Representing Slovakia
Paralympic Games
| Bronze medal – third place | 2020 Tokyo | Teams C4-5 |
World Championships
| Bronze medal – third place | 2018 Lasko | Singles C4 |
World Team Championships
| Bronze medal – third place | 2017 Bratislava | Teams C4 |

Boris Trávníček (born 19 May 1998) is a Czech-born Slovak para table tennis player who competes in international table tennis competitions. He is a Paralympic bronze medalist and a double World bronze medalist.

In 2011, a headstone fell onto Trávníček during a class excursion at a Jewish cemetery in Rousinov. He had an open fracture in his right leg, a broken left arm and injured his vertebrae which resulted in paraplegia.
