= Jang Yeong-jin (table tennis) =

South Korean para table tennis player (born 1993)

Park Sung-joo
Personal information
- Born: 9 March 1993 (age 33)

Sport
- Country: South Korea
- Sport: Para table tennis
- Disability class: D4
Medal record
Men's para table tennis
Representing South Korea
Paralympic Games
Silver medal – second place	2024 Paris	Doubles MD4
Bronze medal – third place	2024 Paris	Singles MS3
Asian Para Games
Gold medal – first place	2022 Hangzhou	Doubles MD4
Bronze medal – third place	2022 Hangzhou	Singles MS3

Jang Yeong-jin (born 9 March 1993) is a South Korean para table tennis player. He competed at the 2024 Summer Paralympics where he reached the gold medal match of the men's doubles MD4 event with Park Sung-joo.
