= Park Sung-joo =

South Korean para table tennis player (born 1979)

Personal information
- Born: 25 November 1979 (age 46)

Sport
- Country: South Korea
- Sport: Para table tennis
- Disability class: D4
Medal record
Para table tennis
Representing South Korea
Paralympic Games
Silver medal – second place	2024 Paris	Men's doubles MD4

Park Sung-joo (born 25 November 1979) is a South Korean para table tennis player. He competed at the 2024 Summer Paralympics where he reached the gold medal match of the men's doubles MD4 event with Jang Yeong-jin.
