= Rafał Czuper =

Polish para table tennis player (born 1988)

Personal information
- Nickname: Czupi
- Born: 19 February 1988 (age 38) Suwałki, Poland
- Height: 184 cm (6 ft 0 in)
- Weight: 72 kg (159 lb)

Sport
- Country: Poland
- Sport: Para table tennis
- Disability: Spinal cord injury
- Disability class: C2
- Club: PSSON Start Białystok
- Coached by: Marek Iwanicki (2010-)
Medal record
Para table tennis
Representing Poland
Paralympic Games
| Gold medal – first place | 2024 Paris | Men's singles C2 |
| Silver medal – second place | 2016 Rio de Janeiro | Men's singles C2 |
| Silver medal – second place | 2020 Tokyo | Men's singles C2 |
| Bronze medal – third place | 2020 Tokyo | Men's team C1-2 |
World Championships
| Silver medal – second place | 2014 Beijing | Men's teams C4 |
| Silver medal – second place | 2018 Lasko | Men's singles C2 |
World Team Championships
| Bronze medal – third place | 2017 Bratislava | Men's teams C2 |
European Championships
| Gold medal – first place | 2013 Lignano | Men's singles C2 |
| Silver medal – second place | 2015 Vejle | Men's singles C2 |
| Silver medal – second place | 2017 Lasko | Men's singles C2 |
| Bronze medal – third place | 2015 Vejle | Men's teams C3 |

Rafał Czuper (born 19 February 1988) is a Polish para table tennis player. He competed at the 2016 Summer Paralympics, winning a silver medal. He competed at the 2020 Summer Paralympics, winning a silver and bronze medal.

He competed at the 2013 European championship.
