= Peter Lovaš =

Slovak para table tennis player

Personal information
- Born: 14 December 1978 (age 47) Levice, Czechoslovakia

Sport
- Country: Slovakia
- Sport: Para table tennis
- Disability class: C4
Medal record
Para table tennis
Representing Slovakia
Paralympic Games
Gold medal – first place	2024 Paris	Men's doubles MD4

Peter Lovaš (born 14 December 1978) is a Slovak para table tennis player.

Lovaš was born on 14 December 1978 in Levice. He began using a wheelchair after a car crash he was involved in at the age of 20. Lovaš started playing para table tennis in 2012 and by 2020 he reached the elite level.

He competed at the 2024 Summer Paralympics, where he reached the gold medal match of the men's doubles MD4 event with Ján Riapoš.
