= Fabien Lamirault =

French para table tennis player

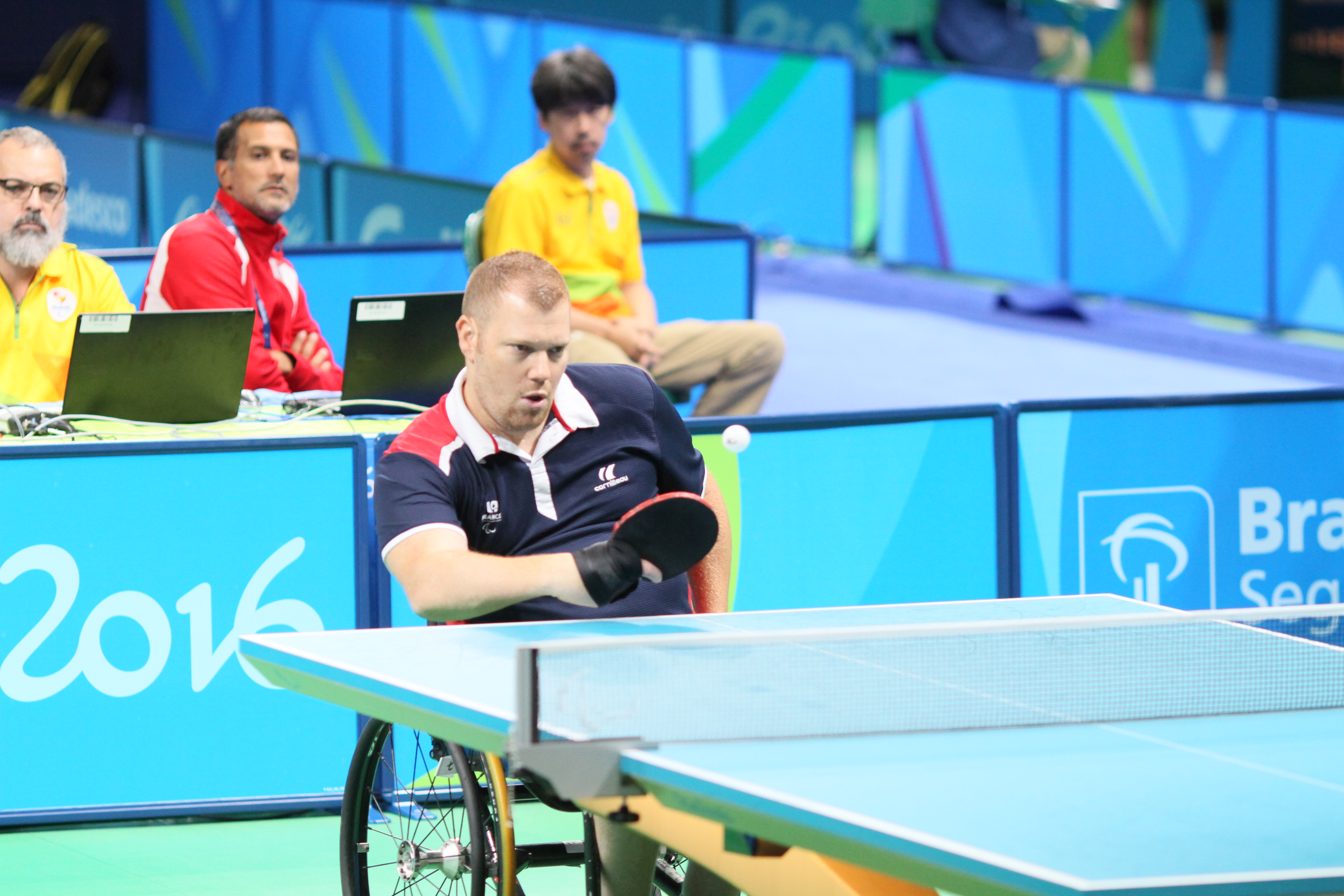
- Lamirault at the 2016 Summer Paralympics

Personal information
- Nickname: Fab
- Nationality: French
- Born: 17 March 1980 (age 46) Longjumeau, France

Sport
- Country: France
- Sport: Para table tennis
- Disability: Spinal cord injury
- Disability class: C2
- Club: C.S.I.N.I
- Coached by: Kosiak Fabrice
Medal record
Men's para table tennis
Representing France
Paralympic Games
Gold medal – first place	2016 Rio de Janeiro	Singles C2
Gold medal – first place	2016 Rio de Janeiro	Team C1-2
Silver medal – second place	2012 London	Team C1-2
Bronze medal – third place	2012 London	Singles C2
Bronze medal – third place	2024 Paris	Singles C2
Bronze medal – third place	2024 Paris	Doubles MD4
World Championships
Gold medal – first place	2014 Beijing	Singles C2
Gold medal – first place	2014 Beijing	Teams C2
Gold medal – first place	2018 Lasko	Singles C2
World Team Championships
Silver medal – second place	2017 Bratislava	Team C2
European Championships
Gold medal – first place	2013 Lignano	Teams C2
Gold medal – first place	2015 Vejle	Singles C2
Gold medal – first place	2015 Vejle	Teams C2
Silver medal – second place	2011 Split	Teams C2
Bronze medal – third place	2017 Lasko	Teams C2

Fabien Lamirault (born 17 March 1980) is a French para table tennis player.

He has won three world titles, three European titles and two Paralympic titles in para table tennis, he has won team titles with Stephane Molliens and Jean-François Ducay. Lamirault became a quadriplegic in 1998 after a car accident and he started playing table tennis during his rehabilitation. He was one of the five French Paralympians who lit the cauldron of the 2024 Summer Paralympics in Paris.
