= Park Jin-cheol =

South Korean para table tennis player

Personal information
- Born: 12 June 1982 (age 44) Busan, South Korea

Sport
- Sport: Table tennis
Medal record
Men's para table tennis
Representing South Korea
Paralympic Games
| Silver medal – second place | 2020 Tokyo | Team C1–2 |
| Bronze medal – third place | 2020 Tokyo | Singles C2 |
| Bronze medal – third place | 2024 Paris | Doubles MD4 |
World Championships
| Gold medal – first place | 2022 Granada | Doubles C4 |
| Gold medal – first place | 2022 Granada | Mixed doubles C4 |
Asian Para Games
| Gold medal – first place | 2018 Jakarta | Singles C2 |
| Gold medal – first place | 2018 Jakarta | Teams C1-2 |
| Gold medal – first place | 2022 Hangzhou | Singles C2 |
| Gold medal – first place | 2022 Hangzhou | Mixed doubles C4 |
| Bronze medal – third place | 2022 Hangzhou | Doubles C4 |

Park Jin-cheol (born 12 June 1982) is a South Korean para table tennis player. He won one of the bronze medals in the men's individual C2 event at the 2020 Summer Paralympics held in Tokyo, Japan. He also won the silver medal in the men's team C1–2 event.
