= Cha Soo-yong =

South Korean para table tennis player (born 1980)

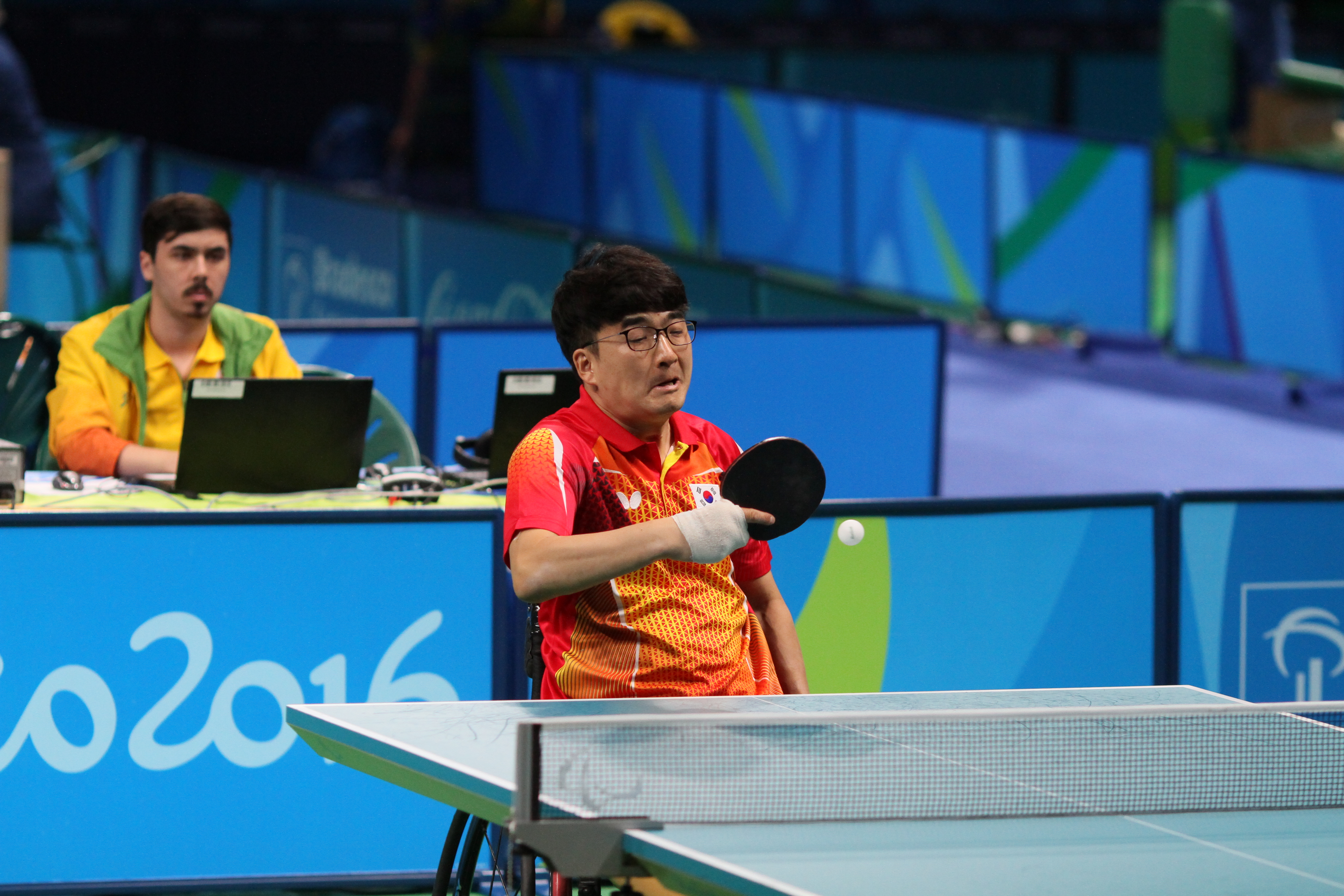
- Cha at the 2016 Summer Paralympics

Personal information
- Born: 30 August 1980 (age 45) Daegu, South Korea
- Height: 176 cm (5 ft 9 in)
- Weight: 70 kg (154 lb)

Sport
- Sport: Table tennis
- Playing style: Right-handed shakehand grip
- Disability class: 2
- Highest ranking: 3 (June 2019)
- Current ranking: 5 (February 2020)
Medal record
Men's para table tennis
Representing South Korea
Paralympic Games
Silver medal – second place	2016 Rio de Janeiro	Teams C1–2
Bronze medal – third place	2024 Paris	Doubles MD4
Bronze medal – third place	2024 Paris	Men's singles C2
World Championships
Silver medal – second place	2014 Beijing	Teams C2
Asian Para Games
Gold medal – first place	2018 Jakarta	Teams C1–2
Silver medal – second place	2018 Jakarta	Singles C2
Silver medal – second place	2022 Hangzhou	Singles C2
Bronze medal – third place	2014 Incheon	Singles C2
Asian Championships
Gold medal – first place	2015 Amman	Singles C2
Gold medal – first place	2017 Beijing	Teams C1–2
Gold medal – first place	2019 Taichung	Teams C1–2
Silver medal – second place	2013 Beijing	Singles C2
Silver medal – second place	2017 Beijing	Singles C2
Bronze medal – third place	2019 Taichung	Singles C2

Cha Soo-yong (Korean: 차수용; RR: Cha Suyong, born 30 August 1980) is a South Korean para table tennis player. He won a silver medal at the 2016 Summer Paralympics. He is coached by Choi Kyoung-sik.

== Personal life ==
His disability is congenital.
