= Martin Ludrovský =

Slovak para table tennis player

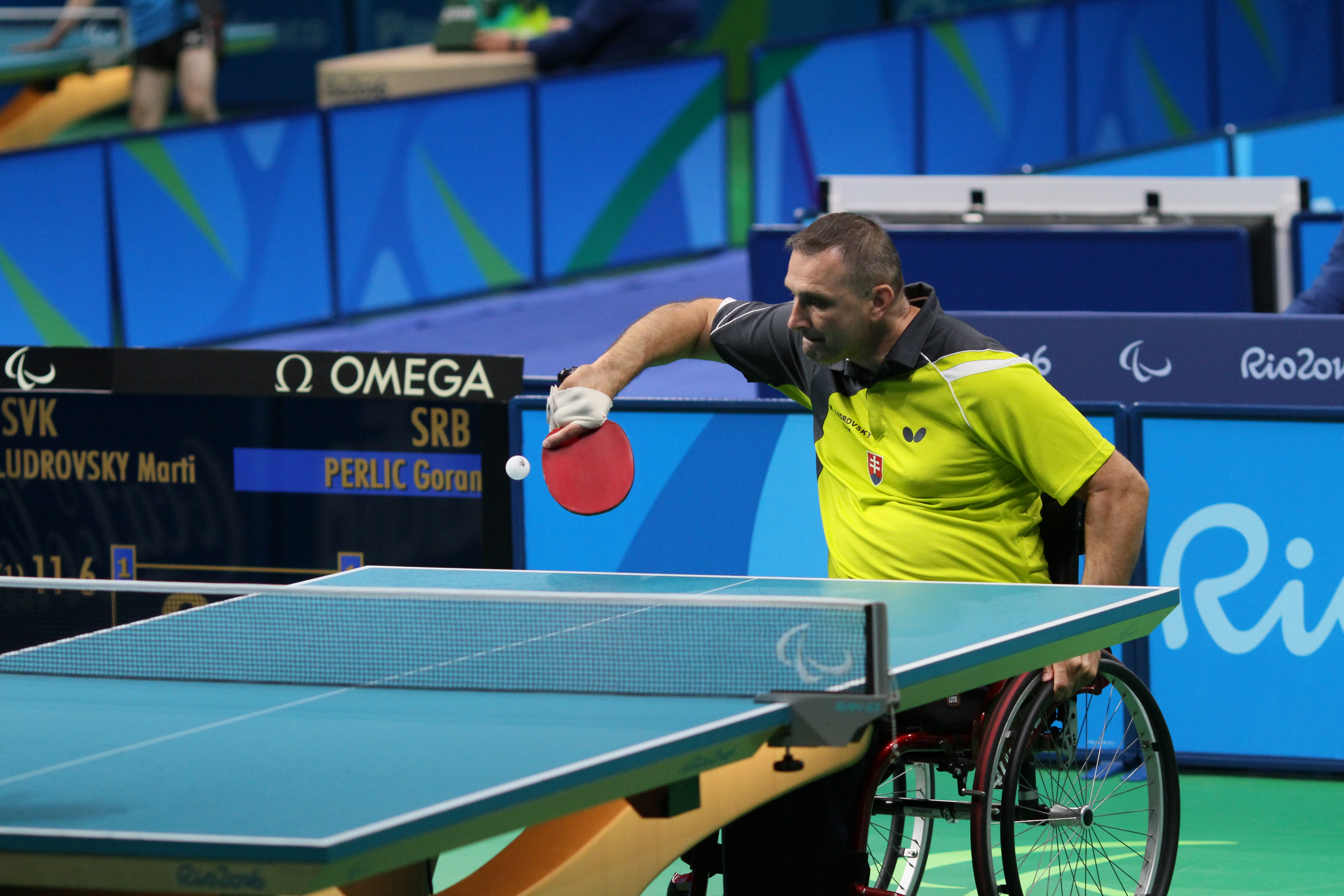
- Ludrovský in 2016

Personal information
- Nickname: Ludro
- Nationality: Slovakian
- Born: 1 September 1973 (age 52) Košice, Czechoslovakia
- Home town: Obisovce, Slovakia
- Height: 191 cm (6 ft 3 in)

Sport
- Country: Slovakia
- Sport: Para table tennis
- Disability: Paraplegia
- Club: SK Zarnovica
- Coached by: Ľuboš Dobrotka; Sasa Dragas
Medal record
Para table tennis
Representing Slovakia
Paralympic Games
Gold medal – first place	2012 London	Men's team C1-2
Bronze medal – third place	2020 Tokyo	Men's team C1-2
World Championships
Gold medal – first place	2010 Gwangju	Men's teams C1-2
World Team Championships
Gold medal – first place	2017 Bratislava	Men's teams C2
European Championships
Gold medal – first place	2009 Genoa	Men's team C2
Gold medal – first place	2011 Split	Men's team C2
Gold medal – first place	2017 Lasko	Men's team C2
Silver medal – second place	2013 Lignano	Men's team C2
Silver medal – second place	2015 Vejle	Men's team C2
Bronze medal – third place	2017 Lasko	Men's singles C2

Martin Ludrovský (born 1 September 1973) is a Slovak para table tennis player who has won six major titles in team events (two world, three European and one in the Summer Paralympics). He has partnered with Ján Riapoš in most of his team event titles.

He had a spinal cord injury in 2005 after being involved in a car accident in Prešov.
