= Table tennis at the 2004 Summer Paralympics – Men's individual – Class 3 =

Table tennis – Men's singles 3 at the XII Paralympic Games
- Paralympic table tennis
- Venue: Galatsi Olympic Hall
- Dates: 18–21 September 2004
- Competitors: 24 from 15 nations

Medalists
1st place, gold medalist(s)		Kim Young Gun	South Korea
2nd place, silver medalist(s)		Jean-Philippe Robin	France
3rd place, bronze medalist(s)		Zlatko Kesler	Serbia and Montenegro

The men's singles 3 table tennis competition at the 2004 Summer Paralympics was held from 18 to 21 September at the Galatsi Olympic Hall.

Classes 1-5 were for athletes with a physical impairment that affected their legs, who competed in a sitting position. The lower the number, the greater the impact the impairment was on an athlete's ability to compete.

The event was won by Kim Young Gun, representing South Korea.

== Results ==
=== Preliminaries ===
Qualified for final round

==== Group A ====
Rank	Competitor	MP	W	L	Points	SCG	AUT	CZE	GRE
1	Zlatko Kesler (SCG)	3	3	0	9:3	x	3:1	3:2	3:0
2	Egon Kramminger (AUT)	3	2	1	7:5	1:3	x	3:2	3:0
3	František Glazar (CZE)	3	1	2	7:6	2:3	2:3	x	3:0
4	Konstantinos Siachos (GRE)	3	0	3	0:9	0:3	0:3	0:3	x

==== Group B ====
Rank	Competitor	MP	W	L	Points	KOR	GBR	ESP	NOR
1	Kim Young Gun (KOR)	3	3	0	9:2	x	3:1	3:1	3:0
2	Neil Robinson (GBR)	3	2	1	7:5	1:3	x	3:2	3:0
3	Miguel Rodríguez (ESP)	3	1	2	6:6	1:3	2:3	x	3:0
4	Christian Rosnes (NOR)	3	0	3	0:9	0:3	0:3	0:3	x

==== Group C ====
Rank	Competitor	MP	W	L	Points	AUT	SVK	GBR	GER
1	Manfred Dollmann (AUT)	3	3	0	9:2	x	3:0	3:2	3:0
2	Ján Koščo (SVK)	3	2	1	6:5	0:3	x	3:2	3:0
3	James Rawson (GBR)	3	1	2	7:6	2:3	2:3	x	3:0
4	Berthold Scheuvens (GER)	3	0	3	0:9	0:3	0:3	0:3	x

==== Group D ====
Rank	Competitor	MP	W	L	Points	GER	FRA	EGY	AUT
1	Jan Gürtler (GER)	3	2	1	6:3	x	3:0	0:3	3:0
2	Pascal Verger (FRA)	3	2	1	6:5	0:3	x	3:2	3:0
3	Ali Mohamed Nars (EGY)	3	1	2	6:6	3:0	2:3	x	1:3
4	Peter Wolf (AUT)	3	1	2	3:7	0:3	0:3	3:1	x

==== Group E ====
Rank	Competitor	MP	W	L	Points	ESP	SWE	TPE	SVK
1	Tomas Piñas (ESP)	3	3	0	9:4	x	3:2	3:2	3:0
2	Oerjan Kylevik (SWE)	3	2	1	8:5	2:3	x	3:1	3:1
3	Wu Cheng Sheng (TPE)	3	1	2	6:7	2:3	1:3	x	3:1
4	Peter Valka (SVK)	3	0	3	2:9	0:3	1:3	1:3	x

==== Group F ====
Rank	Competitor	MP	W	L	Points	FRA	GBR	KOR	BRA
1	Jean-Philippe Robin (FRA)	3	3	0	9:0	x	3:0	3:0	3:0
2	Stefan Trofan (GBR)	3	1	2	5:7	0:3	x	2:3	3:1
3	Yang Heung Sik (KOR)	3	1	2	5:8	0:3	3:2	x	2:3
4	Luiz da Silva (BRA)	3	1	2	4:8	0:3	1:3	3:2	x

=== Competition bracket ===
Round of 16
Neil Robinson (GBR)	3
Pascal Verger (FRA)	2
Jean-Philippe Robin (FRA)	3
Oerjan Kylevik (SWE)	0
Egon Kramminger (AUT)	2
Tomas Piñas (ESP)	3
Ján Koščo (SVK)	3
Stefan Trofan (GBR)	1

Quarterfinals
Zlatko Kesler (SCG)	3
Neil Robinson (GBR)	0
Jean-Philippe Robin (FRA)	3
Manfred Dollmann (AUT)	0
Jan Gürtler (GER)	0
Tomas Piñas (ESP)	3
Jan Kosco (SVK)	1
Kim Young Gun (KOR)	3

Semifinals
Zlatko Kesler (SCG)	1
Jean-Philippe Robin (FRA)	3
Tomas Piñas (ESP)	0
Kim Young Gun (KOR)	3

Final
Jean-Philippe Robin (FRA)	0
Kim Young Gun (KOR)	3
Third place
Zlatko Kesler (SCG)	3
Tomas Piñas (ESP)	0
