= Table tennis at the 2012 Summer Paralympics – Men's individual – Class 2 =

Table tennis at the XIV Paralympic Games
- Venue: ExCeL Exhibition Centre
- Dates: 30 August – 3 September 2012
- Competitors: 18 from 11 nations

Medalists
| 1st place, gold medalist(s) | | Ján Riapoš | Slovakia |
| 2nd place, silver medalist(s) | | Kyung-Mook Kim | South Korea |
| 3rd place, bronze medalist(s) | | Fabien Lamirault | France |

The Men's individual table tennis – Class 2 tournament at the 2012 Summer Paralympics in London took place from 30 August to 3 September 2012 at ExCeL Exhibition Centre. Classes 1-5 were for athletes with a physical impairment that affects their legs, and who competed in a sitting position. The lower the number, the greater the impact the impairment was on an athlete's ability to compete.

In the preliminary stage, athletes competed in six groups of three. Winners of each group qualified for the finals stages.

== Results ==
All times are local (BST/UTC+1)

=== Finals ===
Quarter-finals: 1 Sep 11:00
E1 | Sergey Poddubnyy (RUS) | 11 | 13 | 11
D1 | Vincent Boury (FRA) | 8 | 11 | 9
C1 | Kim Min-gyu (KOR) | 3 | 8 | 8
F1 | Fabien Lamirault (FRA) | 11 | 11 | 11

Semifinals: 1 Sep 17:30
A1 | Kim Kyung Mook (KOR) | 16 | 11 | 11
E1 | Sergey Poddubnyy (RUS) | 14 | 4 | 2
F1 | Fabien Lamirault (FRA) | 9 | 6 | 4
B1 | Jan Riapos (SVK) | 11 | 11 | 11

Gold-medal match: 3 Sep 17:15
A1 | Kim Kyung Mook (KOR) | 3 | 11 | 9 | 8
B1 | Jan Riapos (SVK) | 11 | 9 | 11 | 11
Bronze-medal match
E1 | Sergey Poddubnyy (RUS) | 6 | 11 | 17 | 9 | 5
F1 | Fabien Lamirault (FRA) | 11 | 7 | 15 | 11 | 11

=== Preliminary round ===
| Qualified for the knock-out stages |

==== Group A ====
| Athlete | Won | Lost | Points diff |
|---|---|---|---|
| Kim Kyung Mook (KOR) | 2 | 0 | +23 |
| Hassan Janfeshan (IRI) | 1 | 1 | +1 |
| Hans Ruep (AUT) | 0 | 2 | -24 |

30 August, 11:00

| Kim Kyung Mook (KOR) | 13 | 12 | 11 |
| Hassan Janfeshan (IRI) | 11 | 10 | 7 |

30 August, 18:00

| Hassan Janfeshan (IRI) | 15 | 11 | 11 | 11 |
| Hans Ruep (AUT) | 17 | 7 | 6 | 9 |

31 August, 16:00

| Kim Kyung Mook (KOR) | 11 | 11 | 11 |
| Hans Ruep (AUT) | 7 | 4 | 7 |

==== Group B ====
| Athlete | Won | Lost | Points diff |
|---|---|---|---|
| Jan Riapos (SVK) | 2 | 0 | +20 |
| Kim Kong Yong (KOR) | 1 | 1 | -4 |
| Giuseppe Vella (ITA) | 0 | 2 | -16 |

30 August, 11:00

| Jan Riapos (SVK) | 12 | 11 | 11 |
| Giuseppe Vella (ITA) | 10 | 6 | 8 |

30 August, 18:00

| Giuseppe Vella (ITA) | 11 | 6 | 8 | 10 |
| Kim Kong Yong (KOR) | 7 | 11 | 11 | 12 |

31 August, 16:00

| Jan Riapos (SVK) | 11 | 11 | 14 | 11 |
| Kim Kong Yong (KOR) | 6 | 8 | 16 | 7 |

==== Group C ====
| Athlete | Won | Lost | Points diff |
|---|---|---|---|
| Kim Min-gyu (KOR) | 2 | 0 | +37 |
| Gao Yanming (CHN) | 1 | 1 | -8 |
| Iranildo Espindola (BRA) | 0 | 2 | -29 |

30 August, 11:40

| Kim Min-gyu (KOR) | 11 | 11 | 11 |
| Iranildo Espindola (BRA) | 3 | 7 | 8 |

30 August, 18:40

| Iranildo Espindola (BRA) | 11 | 10 | 5 | 2 |
| Gao Yanming (CHN) | 8 | 12 | 11 | 11 |

31 August, 16:00

| Kim Min-gyu (KOR) | 11 | 11 | 11 |
| Gao Yanming (CHN) | 2 | 2 | 7 |

==== Group D ====
| Athlete | Won | Lost | Points diff |
|---|---|---|---|
| Vincent Boury (FRA) | 2 | 0 | +36 |
| Martin Ludrovsky (SVK) | 1 | 1 | +18 |
| Ronan Rooney (IRL) | 0 | 2 | -44 |

30 August, 11:40

| Vincent Boury (FRA) | 11 | 11 | 11 |
| Ronan Rooney (IRL) | 2 | 2 | 3 |

30 August, 18:40

| Ronan Rooney (IRL) | 2 | 8 | 5 |
| Martin Ludrovsky (SVK) | 11 | 11 | 11 |

31 August, 16:00

| Vincent Boury (FRA) | 8 | 11 | 11 | 11 |
| Martin Ludrovsky (SVK) | 11 | 9 | 9 | 5 |

==== Group E ====
| Athlete | Won | Lost | Points diff |
|---|---|---|---|
| Sergey Poddubnyy (RUS) | 1 | 1 | -3 |
| Rastislav Revucky (SVK) | 1 | 1 | -2 |
| Stephane Molliens (FRA) | 1 | 1 | +5 |

30 August, 11:40

| Stephane Molliens (FRA) | 8 | 8 | 8 |
| Rastislav Revucky (SVK) | 11 | 11 | 11 |

30 August, 18:40

| Rastislav Revucky (SVK) | 7 | 9 | 6 |
| Sergey Poddubnyy (RUS) | 11 | 11 | 11 |

31 August, 16:40

| Stephane Molliens (FRA) | 11 | 11 | 11 | 11 |
| Sergey Poddubnyy (RUS) | 6 | 3 | 13 | 8 |

==== Group F ====
| Athlete | Won | Lost | Points diff |
|---|---|---|---|
| Fabien Lamirault (FRA) | 2 | 0 | +13 |
| Ronaldo Souza (BRA) | 1 | 1 | +10 |
| Jiří Suchánek (CZE) | 0 | 2 | -23 |

30 August, 11:40

| Jiří Suchánek (CZE) | 9 | 8 | 13 |
| Ronaldo Souza (BRA) | 11 | 11 | 15 |

30 August, 18:40

| Ronaldo Souza (BRA) | 6 | 11 | 11 | 8 | 6 |
| Fabien Lamirault (FRA) | 11 | 1 | 5 | 11 | 11 |

31 August, 16:40

| Jiří Suchánek (CZE) | 2 | 12 | 7 | 6 |
| Fabien Lamirault (FRA) | 11 | 10 | 11 | 11 |
