= Table tennis at the 2008 Summer Paralympics – Men's individual – Class 2 =

Men's Individual Class 2 at the XIII Paralympic Games
- Venue: Peking University Gymnasium
- Dates: 7 – 11 September 2008
- Competitors: 16 from 11 nations

Medalists
1st place, gold medalist(s)		Vincent Boury	France
2nd place, silver medalist(s)		Stephane Molliens	France
3rd place, bronze medalist(s)		Kim Kyung Mook	South Korea

The Men's Individual Class 2 table tennis competition at the 2008 Summer Paralympics was held between 7 September and 11 September at the Peking University Gymnasium.

Classes 1-5 were for athletes with a physical impairment that affected their legs, who competed in a sitting position. The lower the number, the greater the impact the impairment was on an athlete’s ability to compete.

The event was won by Vincent Boury, representing France.

== Results ==
=== Preliminary round ===
Qualified for the knock-out stages

==== Group A ====
Rank	Competitor	MP	W	L	Points	FRA	RUS	KOR	LBA
1	Stephane Molliens (FRA)	3	3	0	9:1	x	3:0	3:1	3:0
2	Sergey Poddubnyy (RUS)	3	2	1	6:5	0:3	x	3:2	3:0
3	Kim Kong Yong (KOR)	3	1	2	6:6	1:3	2:3	x	3:0
4	Ali Mabrouk Ahmed (LBA)	3	0	3	0:9	0:3	0:3	0:3	x

7 September, 16:40

Stephane Molliens (FRA)	11	15	11
Sergey Poddubnyy (RUS)	6	13	7
Kim Kong-yong (KOR)	11	11	11
Ali Mabrouk Ahmed (LBA)	5	5	2

8 September, 12:00

Stephane Molliens (FRA)	11	11	11		
Ali Mabrouk Ahmed (LBA)	0	4	5		
Sergey Poddubnyy (RUS)	11	12	8	6	11
Kim Kong-yong (KOR)	6	10	11	11	7

8 September, 19:20

Sergey Poddubnyy (RUS)	11	11	11	
Ali Mabrouk Ahmed (LBA)	5	6	6	
Stephane Molliens (FRA)	11	9	11	11
Kim Kong-yong (KOR)	6	11	7	5

==== Group B ====
Rank	Competitor	MP	W	L	Points	KOR	SVK	FRA	CHN
1	Kim Kyung Mook (KOR)	3	3	0	9:2	x	3:0	3:2	3:0
2	Jan Riapos (SVK)	3	2	1	6:3	0:3	x	3:0	3:0
3	Damien Mennella (FRA)	3	1	2	5:7	2:3	0:3	x	3:1
4	Gao Yanming (CHN)	3	0	3	1:9	0:3	0:3	1:3	x

7 September, 16:40

Jan Riapos (SVK)	11	11	11
Damien Mennella (FRA)	8	8	9
Kim Kyung-mook (KOR)	11	11	11
Gao Yanming (CHN)	3	6	7

8 September, 12:00

Jan Riapos (SVK)	11	11	11		
Gao Yanming (CHN)	7	6	8		
Kim Kyung-mook (KOR)	11	5	4	11	11
Damien Mennella (FRA)	4	11	11	6	6

8 September, 19:20

Damien Mennella (FRA)	8	11	11	11
Gao Yanming (CHN)	11	8	6	6
Kim Kyung-mook (KOR)	11	11	11	
Jan Riapos (SVK)	9	9	5	

==== Group C ====
Rank	Competitor	MP	W	L	Points	FRA	BRA	AUT	ITA
1	Vincent Boury (FRA)	3	2	1	7:5	x	1:3	3:0	3:2
2	Iranildo Espindola (BRA)	3	2	1	7:6	3:1	x	1:3	3:2
3	Hans Ruep (AUT)	3	2	1	6:5	0:3	3:1	x	3:1
4	Giuseppe Vella (ITA)	3	0	3	5:9	2:3	2:3	1:3	x

7 September, 16:40

Hans Ruep (AUT)	11	8	11	11
Giuseppe Vella (ITA)	3	11	5	3
Iranildo Espindola (BRA)	11	4	12	11
Vincent Boury (FRA)	8	11	10	4

8 September, 12:00

Hans Ruep (AUT)	11	11	6	11	
Iranildo Espindola (BRA)	8	7	11	6	
Vincent Boury (FRA)	14	11	8	7	11
Giuseppe Vella (ITA)	12	5	11	11	8

8 September, 19:20

Iranildo Espindola (BRA)	10	11	14	8	11
Giuseppe Vella (ITA)	12	5	12	11	8
Vincent Boury (FRA)	12	11	11		
Hans Ruep (AUT)	10	4	6		

==== Group D ====
Rank	Competitor	MP	W	L	Points	DEN	SVK	GER	BRA
1	Lars Hansen (DEN)	3	3	0	9:1	x	3:1	3:0	3:0
2	Rastislav Revucky (SVK)	3	2	1	7:5	1:3	x	3:2	3:0
3	Otto Vilsmaier (GER)	3	1	2	5:6	0:3	2:3	x	3:0
4	Hemerson Kovalski (BRA)	3	0	3	0:9	0:3	0:3	0:3	x

7 September, 16:40

Rastislav Revucky (SVK)	11	9	6	12	11
Otto Vilsmaier (GER)	8	11	11	10	4
Lars Hansen (DEN)	11	11	11		
Hemerson Kovalski (BRA)	4	5	2		

8 September, 12:00

Otto Vilsmaier (GER)	11	11	11	
Hemerson Kovalski (BRA)	5	4	6	
Lars Hansen (DEN)	11	3	11	11
Rastislav Revucky (SVK)	4	11	5	9

8 September, 19:20

Rastislav Revucky (SVK)	11	11	11
Hemerson Kovalski (BRA)	7	4	7
Lars Hansen (DEN)	11	11	11
Otto Vilsmaier (GER)	4	2	7

=== Competition bracket ===
Semifinals: 10 Sep 11:30
Stephane Molliens (FRA)	12	11	6	12
Lars Hansen (DEN)	10	7	11	10
Vincent Boury (FRA)	11	11	5	11
Kim Kyung-mook (KOR)	7	8	11	1

Gold medal match: 11 Sep 17:30
Stephane Molliens (FRA)	7	4	2
Vincent Boury (FRA)	11	11	11
Bronze medal match: 11 Sep 17:30
Lars Hansen (DEN)	11	3	7	7
Kim Kyung-mook (KOR)	5	11	11	11
