= Table tennis at the 2004 Summer Paralympics – Men's team – Class 3 =

Table tennis – Men's teams 3 at the XII Paralympic Games
- Paralympic table tennis
- Venue: Galatsi Olympic Hall
- Dates: 23–27 September 2004
- Competitors: 7

Medalists
1st place, gold medalist(s)		Kim Young Gun; Yang Heung Sik; Cho Jae Kwan	South Korea
2nd place, silver medalist(s)		James Rawson; Neil Robinson; Stefan Trofan	Great Britain
3rd place, bronze medalist(s)		Pascal Verger; Jean-Philippe Robin	France

The Men's Teams 3 table tennis competition at the 2004 Summer Paralympics was held from 23 to 27 September at the Galatsi Olympic Hall.

Classes 1-5 were for athletes with a physical impairment that affected their legs, who competed in a sitting position. The lower the number, the greater the impact the impairment was on an athlete's ability to compete.

The event was won by the team representing South Korea.

== Results ==
=== Preliminaries ===
Qualified for final round

==== Group A ====
Rank	Competitor	MP	W	L	Points	GER	GBR	AUT
1	Germany	2	2	0	6:2	x	3:0	3:2
2	Great Britain	2	1	1	3:4	0:3	x	3:1
3	Austria	2	0	2	3:6	2:3	1:3	x

==== Group B ====
Rank	Competitor	MP	W	L	Points	FRA	KOR	ESP	SVK
1	France	3	3	0	9:2	x	3:1	3:1	3:0
2	South Korea	3	2	1	7:4	1:3	x	3:1	3:0
3	Spain	3	1	2	5:8	1:3	1:3	x	3:2
4	Slovakia	3	0	3	2:9	0:3	0:3	2:3	x

=== Competition bracket ===
Semi-finals
Germany	1
South Korea	3
Great Britain	3
France	2

Final
South Korea	3
Great Britain	0
Third place
Germany	0
France	3

== Team lists ==
Germany; Jan Guertler; Berthold Scheuvens	Great Britain; James Rawson; Neil Robinson; Stefan Trofan	Austria; Manfred Dollmann; Egon Kramminger; Peter Wolf	France; Pascal Verger; Jean-Philippe Robin
South Korea; Kim Young Gun; Yang Heung Sik; Cho Jae Kwan	Spain; Tomas Piñas; Miguel Rodríguez	Slovakia; Jan Kosco; Peter Valka	
