= Table tennis at the 2004 Summer Paralympics – Men's individual – Class 2 =

Table Tennis - Men's Singles 2 at the XII Paralympic Games
- Paralympic Table Tennis
- Venue: Galatsi Olympic Hall
- Dates: 18–21 September 2004
- Competitors: 16 from 10 nations

Medalists
1st place, gold medalist(s)		Jan Riapos	Slovakia
2nd place, silver medalist(s)		Kim Gong Yong	South Korea
3rd place, bronze medalist(s)		Kim Kyung Mook	South Korea

The Men's Singles 2 table tennis competition at the 2004 Summer Paralympics was held from 18 to 21 September at the Galatsi Olympic Hall.

Classes 1-5 were for athletes with a physical impairment that affected their legs, who competed in a sitting position. The lower the number, the greater the impact the impairment was on an athlete’s ability to compete.

The event was won by Jan Riapos, representing Slovakia.

== Results ==
=== Preliminaries ===
Qualified for final round

==== Group A ====
Rank	Competitor	MP	W	L	Points	FIN	FRA	AUT	IRI
1	Jari Kurkinen (FIN)	3	3	0	9:0	x	3:0	3:0	3:0
2	Vincent Boury (FRA)	3	2	1	6:3	0:3	x	3:0	3:0
3	Rudolf Hajek (AUT)	3	1	2	3:7	0:3	0:3	x	3:1
4	Aghil Ali Mardani (IRI)	3	0	3	1:9	0:3	0:3	1:3	x

==== Group B ====
Rank	Competitor	MP	W	L	Points	FRA	KOR	JPN	ISL
1	Stephane Molliens (FRA)	3	2	1	7:4	x	3:0	1:3	3:1
2	Kim Kyung Mook (KOR)	3	2	1	6:3	0:3	x	3:0	3:0
3	Nobuhiro Minami (JPN)	3	2	1	6:4	3:1	0:3	x	3:0
4	Johann Kristjansson (ISL)	3	0	3	1:9	1:3	0:3	0:3	x

==== Group C ====
Rank	Competitor	MP	W	L	Points	FRA	SVK	GER	BRA
1	Marc Sorabella (FRA)	3	2	1	7:4	x	1:3	3:1	3:0
2	Jan Riapos (SVK)	3	2	1	8:6	3:1	x	2:3	3:2
3	Otto Vilsmaier (GER)	3	2	1	7:6	1:3	3:2	x	3:1
4	Iranildo Espindola (BRA)	3	0	3	3:9	0:3	2:3	1:3	x

==== Group D ====
Rank	Competitor	MP	W	L	Points	KOR	SVK	AUT	GER
1	Kim Gong Yong (KOR)	3	3	0	9:1	x	3:1	3:0	3:0
2	Rastislav Revucky (SVK)	3	2	1	7:3	1:3	x	3:0	3:0
3	Hans Ruep (AUT)	3	1	2	3:6	0:3	0:3	x	3:0
4	Thorsten Grünkemeyer (GER)	3	0	3	0:9	0:3	0:3	0:3	x

=== Competition bracket ===
Quarterfinals
Jari Kurkinen (FIN)	1
Kim Kyung Mook (KOR)	3
Marc Sorabella (FRA)	2
Kim Gong Yong (KOR)	3
Jan Riapos (SVK)	3
Vincent Boury (FRA)	1
Rastislav Revucky (SVK)	3
Stephane Molliens (FRA)	1

Semifinals
Kim Kyung Mook (KOR)	1
Kim Gong Yong (KOR)	3
Jan Riapos (SVK)	3
Rastislav Revucky (SVK)	2

Finals
Kim Gong Yong (KOR)	1
Jan Riapos (SVK)	3
Third place
Kim Kyung Mook (KOR)	3
Rastislav Revucky (SVK)	1
