= Table tennis at the 2004 Summer Paralympics – Men's team – Class 1–2 =

Table Tennis - Men's Teams 1-2 at the XII Paralympic Games
- Paralympic Table Tennis
- Venue: Galatsi Olympic Hall
- Dates: 23–27 September 2004
- Competitors: 7

Medalists
1st place, gold medalist(s)		Kim Gong Yong; Kim Kyung Mook; Kang Seong Hoon; Lee Hae Gon	South Korea
2nd place, silver medalist(s)		Rastislav Revucky; Jan Riapos	Slovakia
3rd place, bronze medalist(s)		Otto Vilsmaier; Holger Nikelis; Walter Kilger; Thorsten Gruenkemeyer	Germany

The Men's Teams 1-2 table tennis competition at the 2004 Summer Paralympics was held from 23 to 27 September at the Galatsi Olympic Hall.

Classes 1-5 were for athletes with a physical impairment that affected their legs, who competed in a sitting position. The lower the number, the greater the impact the impairment was on an athlete’s ability to compete.

The event was won by the team representing South Korea.

== Results ==
=== Preliminaries ===
Qualified for final round

==== Group A ====
Rank	Competitor	MP	W	L	Points	FRA	GER	AUT
1	France	2	2	0	6:3	x	3:1	3:2
2	Germany	2	1	1	4:4	1:3	x	3:1
3	Austria	2	0	2	3:6	2:3	1:3	x

==== Group B ====
Rank	Competitor	MP	W	L	Points	KOR	SVK	FIN	ARG
1	South Korea	3	3	0	9:2	x	3:2	3:0	3:0
2	Slovakia	3	2	1	8:3	2:3	x	3:0	3:0
3	Finland	3	1	2	3:6	0:3	0:3	x	3:0
4	Argentina	3	0	3	0:9	0:3	0:3	0:3	x

=== Competition bracket ===
Semi-finals
France	1
Slovakia	3
Germany	1
South Korea	3

Final
Slovakia	1
South Korea	3
Third place
France	2
Germany	3

== Team Lists ==
France; Vincent Boury; Erwan Fouillen; Marc Sorabella; Stéphane Molliens	Germany; Otto Vilsmaier; Holger Nikelis; Walter Kilger; Thorsten Gruenkemeyer	Austria; Rudolf Hajek; Hans Ruep	South Korea; Kim Gong Yong; Kim Kyung Mook; Kang Seong Hoon; Lee Hae Gon
Slovakia; Rastislav Revucky; Jan Riapos	Finland; Jari Kurkinen; Matti Launonen	Argentina; Jose Daniel Haylan; Carlos Maslup	
