= Table tennis at the 2012 Summer Paralympics – Men's team – Class 1–2 =

Table tennis Men's team C1-2 at the XIV Paralympic Games
- Venue: ExCeL Exhibition Centre
- Dates: September 5 - September 7, 2012
- Competitors: 7

Medalists
1st place, gold medalist(s)		Rastislav Revucky; Jan Riapos	Slovakia
2nd place, silver medalist(s)		Vincent Boury; Stephane Molliens; Fabien Lamirault	France
3rd place, bronze medalist(s)		Kim Kong Yong; Kim Min-gyu; Kim Kyung Mook	South Korea

The Men's team table tennis - Class 1-2 tournament at the 2012 Summer Paralympics in London is taking place from 5 September to 7 September 2012 at ExCeL Exhibition Centre. Classes 1-5 are for athletes with a physical impairment that affects their legs, and who compete in a sitting position. The lower the number, the greater the impact the impairment has on an athlete's ability to compete.

== Bracket ==
Quarterfinals
Ireland (IRL)	0
France (FRA)	3
Austria (AUT)	3
Italy (ITA)	1
Brazil (BRA)	0
Slovakia (SVK)	3

Semifinals
South Korea (KOR)	2
France (FRA)	3
Austria (AUT)	0
Slovakia (SVK)	3

Gold Medal
France (FRA)	0
Slovakia (SVK)	3
Bronze Medal
South Korea (KOR)	3
Austria (AUT)	0

== Results ==
=== Quarter-finals ===
5 September 2012; 11:30	Ireland	0–3	France

Report	Individual matches
Ronan Rooney	0–3	Vincent Boury	4–11, 6–11, 4–11
Philip Quinlan	0–3	Stephane Molliens	5–11, 7–11, 7–11
Ronan Rooney	0–3	Stephane Molliens	7–11, 4–11, 2–11

5 September 2012; 11:30	Austria	3–1	Italy

Report	Individual matches
Andreas Vevera	3–0	Andrea Borgato	11–9, 11–7, 11–5
Hans Ruep	3–2	Giuseppe Vella	13–11, 8–11, 11–4, 10–12, 11–1
Andreas Vevera	2–3	Giuseppe Vella	12–10, 10–12, 4–11, 11–9, 10–12
Hans Ruep	3–0	Andrea Borgato	11–6, 11–5, 11–2

5 September 2012; 11:30	Brazil	0–3	Slovakia

Report	Individual matches
Iranildo Espindola	1–3	Rastislav Revucky	13–15, 9–11, 11–7, 7–11
Ronaldo Souza	0–3	Jan Riapos	7–11, 5–11, 6–11
Iranildo Espindola	2–3	Jan Riapos	11–5, 7–11, 2–11, 11–7, 7–11

=== Semi-finals ===
6 September 2012; 16:30	South Korea	2–3	France

Report	Individual matches
Kim Min-gyu	3–2	Fabien Lamirault	18–16, 8–11, 11–7, 8–11, 11–8
Kim Kyung Mook	2–3	Stephane Molliens	11–13, 11–8, 13–11, 7–11, 3–11
Kim Min-gyu	2–3	Stephane Molliens	5–11, 11–6, 8–11, 11–5, 6–11
Kim Kyung Mook	3–1	Fabien Lamirault	11–4, 11–6, 14–16, 11–7
Kim Kong Yong / Kim Kyung Mook	2–3	Vincent Boury / Stephane Molliens	11–8, 11–8, 7–11, 8–11, 8–11

6 September 2012; 16:30	Austria	0–3	Slovakia

Report	Individual matches
Andreas Vevera	1–3	Jan Riapos	6–11, 11–8, 13–15, 6–11
Hans Ruep	2–3	Rastislav Revucky	7–11, 14–12, 8–11, 11–7, 9–11
Hans Ruep	0–3	Jan Riapos	2–11, 6–11, 8–11
