= Table tennis at the 2008 Summer Paralympics – Men's individual – Class 3 =

Men's individual class 3 at the XIII Paralympic Games
- Venue: Peking University Gymnasium
- Dates: 7 – 11 September 2008
- Competitors: 30 from 19 nations

Medalists
1st place, gold medalist(s)		Feng Panfeng	China
2nd place, silver medalist(s)		Jean-Philippe Robin	France
3rd place, bronze medalist(s)		Tomas Piñas	Spain

The men's individual class 3 table tennis competition at the 2008 Summer Paralympics was held between 7 September and 11 September at the Peking University Gymnasium.

Classes 1-5 were for athletes with a physical impairment that affected their legs, who competed in a sitting position. The lower the number, the greater the impact the impairment was on an athlete’s ability to compete.

The event was won by Feng Panfeng, representing China.

== Results ==
=== Preliminary round ===
Qualified for the knock-out stages

==== Group A ====
Rank	Competitor	MP	W	L	Points	FRA	KOR	SLO
1	Florian Merrien (FRA)	2	2	0	6:0	x	3:0	3:0
2	Jeyoung Young Ill (KOR)	2	1	1	3:5	0:3	x	3:2
3	Bojan Lukezic (SLO)	2	0	2	2:6	0:3	2:3	x

7 September, 20:00: Florian Merrien (FRA) / 11 / 11 / 11; Bojan Lukezic (SLO) / 5 / 4 / 8	8 September, 13:20: Jeyoung Young-ill (KOR) / 10 / 11 / 13 / 9 / 11; Bojan Lukezic (SLO) / 12 / 8 / 11 / 11 / 3	9 September, 14:00: Florian Merrien (FRA) / 11 / 11 / 11; Jeyoung Young-ill (KOR) / 2 / 5 / 7

==== Group B ====
Rank	Competitor	MP	W	L	Points	SRB	ITA	CRC
1	Zlatko Kesler (SRB)	2	2	0	6:2	x	3:1	3:1
2	Nicola Molitierno (ITA)	2	1	1	4:4	1:3	x	3:1
3	Geovanni Rodriguez (CRC)	2	0	2	2:6	1:3	1:3	x

7 September, 20:00: Zlatko Kesler (SRB) / 11 / 11 / 5 / 11; Nicola Molitierno (ITA) / 9 / 6 / 11 / 9	8 September, 13:20: Nicola Molitierno (ITA) / 7 / 11 / 11 / 11; Geovanni Rodriguez (CRC) / 11 / 8 / 8 / 3	9 September, 14:00: Zlatko Kesler (SRB) / 9 / 11 / 11 / 11; Geovanni Rodriguez (CRC) / 11 / 4 / 3 / 9

==== Group C ====
Rank	Competitor	MP	W	L	Points	KOR	CHN	SLO
1	Kim Young Gun (KOR)	2	2	0	6:4	x	3:2	3:2
2	Zhao Ping (CHN)	2	1	1	5:3	2:3	x	3:0
3	Ivan Lisac (SLO)	2	0	2	2:6	2:3	0:3	x

7 September, 20:00: Kim Young-gun (KOR) / 8 / 11 / 8 / 11 / 11; Ivan Lisac (SLO) / 11 / 9 / 11 / 7 / 4	8 September, 16:00: Zhao Ping (CHN) / 11 / 11 / 12; Ivan Lisac (SLO) / 4 / 5 / 10	9 September, 12:40: Kim Young-gun (KOR) / 10 / 11 / 9 / 11 / 11; Zhao Ping (CHN) / 12 / 6 / 11 / 9 / 6

==== Group D ====
Rank	Competitor	MP	W	L	Points	GER	KOR	TPE
1	Jan Gürtler (GER)	2	2	0	6:2	x	3:1	3:1
2	Kim Jeong Seok (KOR)	2	1	1	4:4	1:3	x	3:1
3	Wu Cheng Sheng (TPE)	2	0	2	2:6	1:3	1:3	x

7 September, 20:00: Jan Gürtler (GER) / 10 / 11 / 11 / 11; Wu Cheng-sheng (TPE) / 12 / 6 / 3 / 4	8 September, 16:00: Kim Jeong-seok (KOR) / 7 / 11 / 11 / 11; Wu Cheng-sheng (TPE) / 11 / 8 / 7 / 6	9 September, 12:40: Jan Gürtler (GER) / 11 / 11 / 9 / 11; Kim Jeong-seok (KOR) / 9 / 5 / 11 / 3

==== Group E ====
Rank	Competitor	MP	W	L	Points	FRA	SVK	VEN
1	Jean-Philippe Robin (FRA)	2	2	0	6:0	x	3:0	3:0
2	Jan Kosco (SVK)	2	1	1	3:3	0:3	x	3:0
3	Roberto Quijada (VEN)	2	0	2	0:6	0:3	0:3	x

7 September, 20:00: Jean-Philippe Robin (FRA) / 11 / 12 / 11; Jan Kosco (SVK) / 4 / 10 / 6	8 September, 16:00: Jan Kosco (SVK) / 11 / 11 / 11; Roberto Quijada (VEN) / 9 / 7 / 7	9 September, 14:00: Jean-Philippe Robin (FRA) / 11 / 11 / 14; Roberto Quijada (VEN) / 9 / 8 / 12

==== Group F ====
Rank	Competitor	MP	W	L	Points	CHN	AUT	BRA
1	Feng Panfeng (CHN)	2	2	0	6:1	x	3:1	3:0
2	Manfred Dollmann (AUT)	2	1	1	4:4	1:3	x	3:1
3	Welder Knaf (BRA)	2	0	2	1:6	0:3	1:3	x

7 September, 20:00: Feng Panfeng (CHN) / 11 / 11 / 11; Welder Knaf (BRA) / 5 / 7 / 7	8 September, 16:00: Manfred Dollmann (AUT) / 11 / 11 / 9 / 11; Welder Knaf (BRA) / 7 / 6 / 11 / 7	9 September, 14:00: Feng Panfeng (CHN) / 11 / 10 / 11 / 16; Manfred Dollmann (AUT) / 8 / 12 / 9 / 14

==== Group G ====
Rank	Competitor	MP	W	L	Points	ESP	SWE	GBR
1	Tomas Piñas (ESP)	2	2	0	6:3	x	3:1	3:2
2	Orjan Kylevik (SWE)	2	1	1	4:3	1:3	x	3:0
3	Arnie Chan (GBR)	2	0	2	2:6	2:3	0:3	x

7 September, 20:00: Tomas Piñas (ESP) / 11 / 7 / 7 / 11 / 11; Arnie Chan (GBR) / 8 / 11 / 11 / 7 / 6	8 September, 16:00: Orjan Kylevik (SWE) / 13 / 11 / 11; Arnie Chan (GBR) / 11 / 5 / 8	9 September, 14:00: Tomas Piñas (ESP) / 4 / 11 / 11 / 11; Orjan Kylevik (SWE) / 11 / 5 / 7 / 5

==== Group H ====
Rank	Competitor	MP	W	L	Points	GBR	FRA	LBA
1	Neil Robinson (GBR)	1	1	0	3:1	x	3:1	WBF
2	Yann Guilhem (FRA)	2	1	1	4:3	1:3	x	3:0
3	Khaled Ahmed Abuajela (LBA)	1	0	1	0:3	-	0:3	x

7 September, 20:00: Neil Robinson (GBR) / Won by forfeit; Khaled Ahmed Abuajela (LBA)	8 September, 16:00: Yann Guilhem (FRA) / 11 / 11 / 11; Khaled Ahmed Abuajela (LBA) / 7 / 5 / 4	9 September, 14:00: Neil Robinson (GBR) / 7 / 11 / 11 / 11; Yann Guilhem (FRA) / 11 / 8 / 8 / 8

==== Group I ====
Rank	Competitor	MP	W	L	Points	BRA	AUT	GBR
1	Luiz Algacir Silva (BRA)	2	1	1	4:3	x	3:0	1:3
2	Gunter Unger (AUT)	2	1	1	3:3	0:3	x	3:0
3	James Rawson (GBR)	2	1	1	3:4	3:1	0:3	x

7 September, 20:40: Gunter Unger (AUT) / 12 / 12 / 11; James Rawson (GBR) / 10 / 10 / 9	8 September, 16:00: Luiz Algacir Silva (BRA) / 11 / 11 / 11; Gunter Unger (AUT) / 6 / 9 / 7	9 September, 14:00: James Rawson (GBR) / 13 / 12 / 8 / 11; Luiz Algacir Silva (BRA) / 11 / 10 / 11 / 6

==== Group J ====
Rank	Competitor	MP	W	L	Points	ISR	AUT	NGR
1	Liran Geva (ISR)	2	2	0	6:2	x	3:1	3:1
2	Egon Kramminger (AUT)	2	1	1	4:4	1:3	x	3:1
3	Oluade Egbinola (NGR)	2	0	2	2:6	1:3	1:3	x

7 September, 20:40: Egon Kramminger (AUT) / 10 / 11 / 11 / 11; Oluade Egbinola (NGR) / 12 / 8 / 6 / 3	8 September, 16:00: Liran Geva (ISR) / 10 / 11 / 11 / 11; Oluade Egbinola (NGR) / 12 / 6 / 5 / 7	9 September, 14:00: Liran Geva (ISR) / 14 / 10 / 12 / 11; Egon Kramminger (AUT) / 12 / 12 / 10 / 4

=== Competition bracket ===
First round: 9 Sep 17:20
Luiz Algacir Silva (BRA)	11	11	11
Neil Robinson (GBR)	3	9	9
Jean-Philippe Robin (FRA)	13	11	11
Liran Geva (ISR)	11	7	5

Quarter-finals: 9 Sep 20:00
Florian Merrien (FRA)	11	10	8
Luiz Algacir Silva (BRA)	13	12	11
Feng Panfeng (CHN)	9	12	11	6	11
Kim Young-gun (KOR)	11	10	9	11	9
Jan Gürtler (GER)	9	11	8	10
Tomas Piñas (ESP)	11	8	11	12
Jean-Philippe Robin (FRA)	11	8	6	11	11
Zlatko Kesler (SRB)	2	11	11	4	9

Semifinals: 10 Sep 11:30
Luiz Algacir Silva (BRA)	1	7	3
Feng Panfeng (CHN)	11	11	11
Tomas Piñas (ESP)	6	9	10
Jean-Philippe Robin (FRA)	11	11	12

Gold medal match: 11 Sep 11:30
Feng Panfeng (CHN)	11	11	11
Jean-Philippe Robin (FRA)	4	7	1
Bronze medal match: 11 Sep 11:30
Luiz Algacir Silva (BRA)	10	7	9
Tomas Piñas (ESP)	12	11	11
