= Slovakia at the 2012 Summer Paralympics =

- IPC code: SVK
- NPC: Slovak Paralympic Committee
- Website: www.spv.sk

in London
- Competitors: 34 in 9 sports
- Flag bearer: Vladislav Janovjak
- Medals Ranked 41st: Gold 2 Silver 1 Bronze 3 Total 6

Summer Paralympics appearances (overview)
- 1996; 2000; 2004; 2008; 2012; 2016; 2020; 2024

Other related appearances
- Czechoslovakia (1972–1992)

Slovakia competed at the 2012 Summer Paralympics in London, United Kingdom from August 29 to September 9, 2012.

== Medalists ==
Medal	Name	Sport	Event	Date
Gold	Ján Riapoš	Table tennis	Men's individual – Class 2	3 September
Gold	Ján Riapoš; Rastislav Revúcky; Martin Ludrovský	Table tennis	Men's team – Class 1–2	6 September
Silver	Richard Csejtey	Table tennis	Men's individual – Class 8	3 September
Bronze	Alena Kánová	Table tennis	Women's individual – Class 3	3 September
Bronze	Veronika Vadovičová	Shooting	Women's 50 metre rifle 3 positions SH1	6 September
Bronze	Vladislav Janovjak; Pilot: Robert Mitosinka	Cycling	Men's road race B	8 September

Medals by sport
Sport	1	2	3	Total
Table tennis	2	1	1	4
Shooting	0	0	1	1
Cycling	0	0	1	1

== Athletics ==
Slovakia named three athletes to take part in the Games: Hana Kolníková, Adrián Matušík and Miloslav Bardiovský. Julius Hutka and Marek Margoč were named as alternates.

Men

Athlete	Event	Heat		Semifinal		Final	
Athlete	Event	Result	Rank	Result	Rank	Result	Rank
Adrián Matušík	Men's shot put – F42–44	N/A				15.03	8
Miloslav Bardiovský	Discus throw F32–33–34	N/A				19.83 SB	7
Adrián Matušík	Discus throw F44	N/A				53.94 PB	4

Women

Athlete	Event	Heat		Semifinal		Final	
Athlete	Event	Result	Rank	Result	Rank	Result	Rank
Hana Kolníková	Women's 100 metres T12	12.64 q, PB	2	12.77	3	N/A	
Hana Kolníková	Women's 200 metres T12	26.32	3	N/A			

== Boccia ==
=== Individual events ===
Athlete	Event	Seeding matches	Round of 32	Round of 16	Quarterfinals	Semifinals	Finals	
Athlete	Event	Opposition Score	Opposition Score	Opposition Score	Opposition Score	Opposition Score	Opposition Score	Rank
Robert Mezik	Mixed individual BC2	Serbus (CZE); W 7-2	Connolly (IRL); W 5-2	Yan Z (CHN); L 5-6	did not advance			
Tomas Kral	Mixed individual BC2	Papadakis (GRE); W 5-5	Serbus (CZE); L 1-5	did not advance				
Robert Durkovic	Mixed individual BC4	—N/a		Zheng Y (CHN); L 1-7	did not advance			
Martin Streharsky	Mixed individual BC4	—N/a		S McGuire (GBR); L 1-6	did not advance			

=== Pairs events ===
Athlete	Event	Pool matches				Quarterfinals	Semifinals	Finals	
Athlete	Event	Opposition Score	Opposition Score	Opposition Score	Rank	Opposition Score	Opposition Score	Opposition Score	Rank
Robert Durkovic; Martin Streharsky	Pairs BC4	Dispalto / Vandervies (CAN); L 3-4	P McGuire / S McGuire (GBR); L 0-11	Larpyen / Yoojaoren (THA); L 0-10	4	did not advance			

== Shooting ==
Athlete	Event	Qualification		Final	
Athlete	Event	Score	Rank	Score	Rank
Veronika Vadovicova	Women's 10m Air Rifle Standing SH1	393	3 Q	491.3	7

== See also ==
- Slovakia at the Paralympics
- Slovakia at the 2012 Summer Olympics
