= Table tennis at the 2004 Summer Paralympics – Men's individual – Class 1 =

Table Tennis - Men's Singles 1 at the XII Paralympic Games
- Paralympic Table Tennis
- Venue: Galatsi Olympic Hall
- Dates: 18–21 September 2004
- Competitors: 12 from 8 nations

Medalists
1st place, gold medalist(s)		Holger Nikelis	Germany
2nd place, silver medalist(s)		Lee Hae Gon	South Korea
3rd place, bronze medalist(s)		Walter Kilger	Germany

The Men's Singles 1 table tennis competition at the 2004 Summer Paralympics was held from 18 to 21 September at the Galatsi Olympic Hall.

Classes 1-5 were for athletes with a physical impairment that affected their legs, who competed in a sitting position. The lower the number, the greater the impact the impairment was on an athlete’s ability to compete.

The event was won by Holger Nikelis, representing Germany.

== Results ==
=== Preliminaries ===
Qualified for final round

==== Group A ====
Rank	Competitor	MP	W	L	Points	KOR	GER	HUN	CUB
1	Lee Hae Gon (KOR)	3	2	0	9:3	x	3:3	3:0	3:0
2	Holger Nikelis (GER)	3	2	0	9:4	3:3	x	3:1	3:0
3	Janos Kaiser (HUN)	3	1	2	4:8	0:3	1:3	x	3:2
4	Isbel Trujillo Yero (CUB)	3	0	3	2:9	0:3	0:3	2:3	x

==== Group B ====
Rank	Competitor	MP	W	L	Points	GER	ARG	KOR	FRA
1	Walter Kilger (GER)	3	3	0	9:4	x	3:1	3:2	3:1
2	Jose Daniel Haylan (ARG)	3	1	2	5:6	1:3	x	1:3	3:0
3	Cho Jae Kwan (KOR)	3	1	2	7:7	2:3	3:1	x	2:3
4	Erwan Fouillen (FRA)	3	1	2	4:8	1:3	0:3	3:2	x

==== Group C ====
Rank	Competitor	MP	W	L	Points	FIN	KOR	SUI	ARG
1	Matti Launonen (FIN)	3	3	0	9:2	x	3:0	3:2	3:0
2	Kang Seong Hoon (KOR)	3	2	1	6:4	0:3	x	3:1	3:0
3	Rolf Zumkehr (SUI)	3	1	2	6:7	2:3	1:3	x	3:1
4	Carlos Maslup (ARG)	3	0	3	1:9	0:3	0:3	1:3	x

=== Competition bracket ===
Quarterfinals
Jose Daniel Haylan (ARG)	2
Kang Seong Hoon (KOR)	3
Matti Launonen (FIN)	1
Holger Nikelis (GER)	3

Semifinals
Lee Hae Gon (KOR)	3
Kang Seong Hoon (KOR)	1
Holger Nikelis (GER)	3
Walter Kilger (GER)	2

Finals
Lee Hae Gon (KOR)	0
Holger Nikelis (GER)	3
Third place
Kang Seong Hoon (KOR)	2
Walter Kilger (GER)	3
