= Table tennis at the 2008 Summer Paralympics – Men's team – Class 1–2 =

Men's Team Class 1–2 at the XIII Paralympic Games
- Venue: Peking University Gymnasium
- Dates: 13 – 16 September 2008
- Competitors: 7

Medalists
| 1st place, gold medalist(s) | | Rastislav Revucky; Jan Riapos | Slovakia |
| 2nd place, silver medalist(s) | | Vincent Boury; Jean-Francois Ducay; Damien Mennella; Stephane Molliens | France |
| 3rd place, bronze medalist(s) | | Cho Jae Kwan; Kim Kong Yong; Kim Kyung Mook; Lee Hae Kon | South Korea |

The Men's Team Class 1–2 table tennis competition at the 2008 Summer Paralympics was held between 13 September and 16 September at the Peking University Gymnasium. Classes 6–10 were for athletes with a physical impairment who competed from a standing position; the lower the number, the greater the impact the impairment had on an athlete's ability to compete.

The competition was a straight knock-out format. Each tie was decided by the best of a potential five matches, two singles, a doubles (not necessarily the same players) and two reverse singles.

The event was won by the team representing Slovakia.

== Competition bracket ==
Quarterfinals
Cuba | 0
Slovakia | 3
Austria | 3
Brazil | 1
Germany | 0
France | 3

Semifinals
South Korea | 2
Slovakia | 3
Austria | 1
France | 3

Final
Slovakia | 3
France | 0
Third place
South Korea | 3
Austria | 0

== Quarter-finals ==
| 13 September 2008; 12:30 | Cuba | 0–3 | Slovakia |

| Report | Individual matches |
| Yunier Fernandez | 1–3 | Rastislav Revucky | 6–11, 11–7, 8–11, 11–13 |
| Isvel Trujillo | 0–3 | Jan Riapos | 2–11, 6–11, 6–11 |
| Yunier Fernandez / Isvel Trujillo | 0–3 | Rastislav Revucky / Jan Riapos | 1–11, 8–11, 6–11 |

| 13 September 2008; 12:30 | Brazil | 1–3 | Austria |

| Report | Individual matches |
| Iranildo Espindola | 3–0 | Andreas Vevera | 11–5, 11–8, 11–9 |
| Hemerson Kovalski | 1–3 | Hans Ruep | 14–16, 3–11, 11–8, 6–11 |
| Iranildo Espindola / Hemerson Kovalski | 0–3 | Andreas Vevera / Hans Ruep | 9–11, 6–11, 4–11 |
| Iranildo Espindola | 0–3 | Hans Ruep | 9–11, 8–11, 10–12 |

| 13 September 2008; 12:30 | Germany | 0–3 | France |

| Report | Individual matches |
| Otto Vilsmaier | 2–3 | Stephane Molliens | 8–11, 11–8, 9–11, 11–4, 5–11 |
| Holger Nikelis | 2–3 | Vincent Boury | 11–9, 7–11, 11–9, 3–11, 8–11 |
| Otto Vilsmaier / Holger Nikelis | 0–3 | Vincent Boury / Stephane Molliens | 7–11, 4–11, 10–12 |

== Semi-finals ==
| 14 September 2008; 19:00 | South Korea | 2–3 | Slovakia |

| Report | Individual matches |
| Kim Kong-yong | 3–2 | Rastislav Revucky | 11–6, 9–11, 8–11, 11–5, 12–10 |
| Kim Kyung-mook | 2–3 | Jan Riapos | 12–10, 9–11, 4–11, 11–9, 6–11 |
| Kim Kong Yong / Kim Kyung Mook | 3–0 | Rastislav Revucky / Jan Riapos | 11–5, 11–5, 12–10 |
| Kim Kong-yong | 0–3 | Jan Riapos | 6–11, 8–11, 8–11 |
| Kim Kyung-mook | 1–3 | Rastislav Revucky | 9–11, 5–11, 12–10, 10–12 |

| 14 September 2008; 19:00 | France | 3–1 | Austria |

| Report | Individual matches |
| Vincent Boury | 3–1 | Andreas Vevera | 7–11, 12–10, 11–9, 12–10 |
| Vincent Boury | 3–1 | Hans Ruep | 11–6, 11–6, 6–11, 11–5 |
| Vincent Boury / Stephane Molliens | 2–3 | Andreas Vevera / Hans Ruep | 1–11, 11–7, 6–11, 11–1, 6–11 |
| Vincent Boury | 3–2 | Hans Ruep | 9–11, 11–5, 2–11, 11–9, 11–3 |

== Finals ==
Gold medal match

| 15 September 2008; 19:00 | Slovakia | 3–0 | France |

| Report | Individual matches |
| Jan Riapos | 3–1 | Stephane Molliens | 11–8, 9–11, 11–6, 11–6 |
| Rastislav Revucky | 3–0 | Vincent Boury | 11–9, 13–11, 11–5 |
| Jan Riapos / Rastislav Revucky | 3–0 | Stephane Molliens / Vincent Boury | 11–6, 11–5, 12–10 |

Bronze medal match

| 15 September 2008; 19:00 | South Korea | 3–0 | Austria |

| Report | Individual matches |
| Kim Kong-yong | 3–1 | Andreas Vevera | 11–6, 11–4, 8–11, 11–3 |
| Kim Kyung-mook | 3–0 | Hans Ruep | 11–4, 11–8, 11–5 |
| Kim Kong Yong / Kim Kyung Mook | 3–1 | Andreas Vevera / Hans Ruep | 11–7, 11–7, 10–12, 11–4 |

== Team Lists ==
| Cuba; Yunier Fernandez; Isvel Trujillo | Slovakia; Rastislav Revucky; Jan Riapos | Austria; Hans Ruep; Andreas Vevera | Brazil; Iranildo Espindola; Hemerson Kovalski |
| Germany; Holger Nikelis; Otto Vilsmaier | France; Vincent Boury; Jean-Francois Ducay; Damien Mennella; Stephane Molliens | South Korea; Cho Jae Kwan; Kim Kong Yong; Kim Kyung Mook; Lee Hae Kon | |
