= Table tennis at the 2008 Summer Paralympics – Men's individual – Class 1 =

Men's Individual Class 1 at the XIII Paralympic Games
- Venue: Peking University Gymnasium
- Dates: 7 – 11 September 2008
- Competitors: 8 from 5 nations

Medalists
1st place, gold medalist(s)		Andreas Vevera	Austria
2nd place, silver medalist(s)		Cho Jae Kwan	South Korea
3rd place, bronze medalist(s)		Lee Hae Kon	South Korea

The Men's Individual Class 1 table tennis competition at the 2008 Summer Paralympics was held between 7 September and 11 September at the Peking University Gymnasium.

Classes 1-5 were for athletes with a physical impairment that affected their legs, who competed in a sitting position. The lower the number, the greater the impact the impairment had on an athlete's ability to compete.

The event was won by Andreas Vevera, representing Austria.

== Results ==
=== Preliminary round ===
Qualified for the knock-out stages

==== Group A ====
Rank	Competitor	MP	W	L	Points	KOR	AUT	CUB	GER
1	Cho Jae Kwan (KOR)	3	3	0	9:4	x	3:2	3:2	3:0
2	Andreas Vevera (AUT)	3	2	1	8:3	2:3	x	3:0	3:0
3	Yunier Fernandez (CUB)	3	1	2	5:6	2:3	0:3	x	3:0
4	Walter Kilger (GER)	3	0	3	0:9	0:3	0:3	0:3	x

7 September, 16:00

Cho Jae-kwan (KOR)	11	9	11	5	11
Andreas Vevera (AUT)	6	11	6	11	8
Yunier Fernandez (CUB)	11	11	11		
Walter Kilger (GER)	7	3	9		

8 September, 11:20

Cho Jae-kwan (KOR)	12	8	11	5	18
Yunier Fernandez (CUB)	10	11	3	11	16
Andreas Vevera (AUT)	11	11	11		
Walter Kilger (GER)	6	5	5		

8 September, 18:40

Andreas Vevera (AUT)	11	11	11
Yunier Fernandez (CUB)	9	3	6
Cho Jae-kwan (KOR)	12	12	11
Walter Kilger (GER)	10	10	7

==== Group B ====
Rank	Competitor	MP	W	L	Points	KOR	FRA	GER	CUB
1	Lee Hae Kon (KOR)	3	3	0	9:4	x	3:2	3:2	3:0
2	Jean-François Ducay (FRA)	3	2	1	8:5	2:3	x	3:2	3:0
3	Holger Nikelis (GER)	3	1	2	7:6	2:3	2:3	x	3:0
4	Isvel Trujillo (CUB)	3	0	3	0:9	0:3	0:3	0:3	x

7 September, 16:00

Jean-François Ducay (FRA)	11	7	13	7	11
Holger Nikelis (GER)	8	11	11	11	8
Lee Hae-kon (KOR)	11	14	11		
Isvel Trujillo (CUB)	7	12	4		

8 September, 11:20

Jean-François Ducay (FRA)	11	11	11		
Isvel Trujillo (CUB)	5	5	9		
Lee Hae-kon (KOR)	6	11	11	12	11
Holger Nikelis (GER)	11	8	4	14	2

8 September, 18:40

Holger Nikelis (GER)	11	12	11		
Isvel Trujillo (CUB)	7	10	8		
Lee Hae-kon (KOR)	9	13	4	11	11
Jean-François Ducay (FRA)	11	11	11	4	8

=== Competition bracket ===
Semifinals: 10 Sep 11:30
Cho Jae-kwan (KOR)	9	11	11	11
Jean-François Ducay (FRA)	11	9	8	4
Andreas Vevera (AUT)	11	13	9	15
Lee Hae-kon (KOR)	8	11	11	13

Gold medal match: 11 Sep 12:15
Cho Jae-kwan (KOR)	7	9	9
Andreas Vevera (AUT)	11	11	11
Bronze medal match: 11 Sep 12:15
Jean-François Ducay (FRA)	6	11	10	14
Lee Hae-kon (KOR)	11	8	12	16
