= Lee Hae-gon =

South Korean para table tennis player

Personal information
- Born: 8 October 1953 (age 72) Anyang, Gyeonggi, South Korea
- Height: 180 cm (5 ft 11 in)
- Weight: 74 kg (163 lb)

Sport
- Sport: Table tennis
- Playing style: Right-handed shakehand grip
- Disability class: 1
- Highest ranking: 1 (March 1998)
Medal record
Men's para table tennis
Representing South Korea
Paralympic Games
Gold medal – first place	1988 Seoul	Singles 1A
Gold medal – first place	1988 Seoul	Teams 1A
Gold medal – first place	1992 Barcelona	Teams C1
Gold medal – first place	1996 Atlanta	Singles C1
Gold medal – first place	2000 Sydney	Singles C1
Gold medal – first place	2000 Sydney	Teams C1–2
Gold medal – first place	2004 Athens	Teams C1–2
Silver medal – second place	2004 Athens	Singles C1
Bronze medal – third place	1992 Barcelona	Singles C1
Bronze medal – third place	1996 Atlanta	Teams C1–2
Bronze medal – third place	2008 Beijing	Singles C1
Bronze medal – third place	2008 Beijing	Teams C1–2
World Championships
Gold medal – first place	2002 Taipei	Singles C1
Gold medal – first place	2002 Taipei	Teams C1–2
Gold medal – first place	2006 Montreux	Teams C1
Silver medal – second place	1998 Paris	Singles C1
FESPIC Games
Gold medal – first place	2006 Kuala Lumpur	Singles C1
Silver medal – second place	2002 Busan	Singles C1
Asia and Oceania Championships
Gold medal – first place	2007 Seoul	Singles C1
Bronze medal – third place	2005 Kuala Lumpur	Singles C1
FESPIC Championships
Gold medal – first place	2001 Osaka	Teams C1–2
Silver medal – second place	1999 Taipei	Singles C1
Bronze medal – third place	1997 Hong Kong	Singles C1–2

- Lee Hae-gon
- Hangul: 이해곤
- Hanja: 李海坤
- RR: I Haegon
- MR: I Haegon

Lee Hae-gon (Korean: 이해곤, born 8 October 1953) is a South Korean retired para table tennis player. He has medalled at every Paralympic Games from 1988 to 2008, for a total of seven gold, one silver, and four bronze medals.

Lee, the seventh of eight children in a poor family, enlisted in the Republic of Korea Marine Corps in 1971. The Marine Corps had created a special force to infiltrate North Korea following the Blue House raid, and Lee and other recruits underwent harsh training in Manisan. During one night training session in July 1973, he fell off a cliff and sustained a spinal cord injury. He spent six years in bed, before a missionary persuaded him to try table tennis for rehabilitation.
