= Athletics at the 1984 Summer Paralympics – Men's marathon 1B =

Men's marathon 1B at the VII Paralympic Games
- Paralympic Athletics
- Competitors: 4 from 4 nations

Medalists
1st place, gold medalist(s)		J. Matsson	Sweden
2nd place, silver medalist(s)		Peter Schmid	Switzerland
3rd place, bronze medalist(s)		Ronan Rooney	Ireland

The Men's marathon 1B was a wheelchair marathon event in athletics at the 1984 Summer Paralympics. The race was won by J. Matsson.

== Results ==
Place	Athlete	Time
1	J. Matsson (SWE)	2:55:04
2	Peter Schmid (SUI)	3:00:54
3	Ronan Rooney (IRL)	3:23:13
4	Michael Desanto (AUS)	3:23:17

== See also ==
- Marathon at the Paralympics
