= Kim Kyung-mook =

South Korean para table tennis player

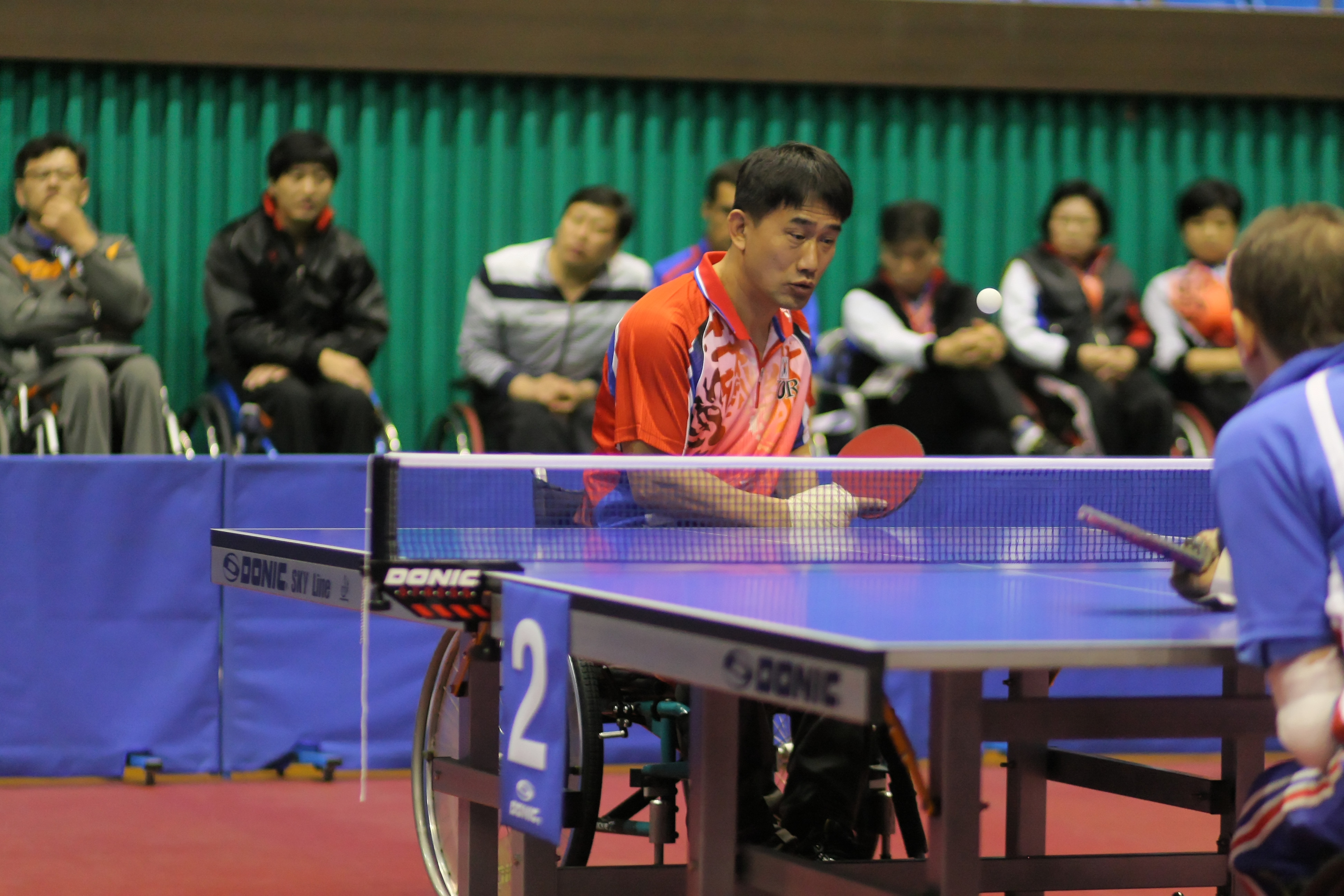
- Kim at the 2010 World Para Table Tennis Championships

Personal information
- Born: February 19, 1965 (age 61) Cheongju, North Chungcheong, South Korea
- Height: 170 cm (5 ft 7 in)
- Weight: 70 kg (154 lb)

Sport
- Sport: Table tennis
- Playing style: Right-handed shakehand grip
- Disability class: 2
- Highest ranking: 1 (March 1998)
- Current ranking: 23 (February 2020)
Medal record
Men's para table tennis
Representing South Korea
Paralympic Games
Gold medal – first place	1996 Atlanta	Singles C2
Gold medal – first place	2000 Sydney	Singles C2
Gold medal – first place	2000 Sydney	Teams C1–2
Gold medal – first place	2004 Athens	Teams C1–2
Silver medal – second place	1992 Barcelona	Teams C2
Silver medal – second place	2012 London	Singles C2
Silver medal – second place	2016 Rio de Janeiro	Teams C1–2
Bronze medal – third place	1992 Barcelona	Singles C2
Bronze medal – third place	1996 Atlanta	Teams C1–2
Bronze medal – third place	2004 Athens	Singles C2
Bronze medal – third place	2008 Beijing	Singles C2
Bronze medal – third place	2008 Beijing	Teams C1–2
Bronze medal – third place	2012 London	Teams C1–2
World Championships
Gold medal – first place	1998 Paris	Singles C2
Gold medal – first place	2002 Taipei	Singles C2
Gold medal – first place	2002 Taipei	Teams C1–2
Gold medal – first place	2006 Montreux	Teams C2
Silver medal – second place	2014 Beijing	Teams C2
Bronze medal – third place	2010 Gwangju	Singles C2
Bronze medal – third place	2010 Gwangju	Teams C1–2
Bronze medal – third place	2014 Beijing	Singles C2
FESPIC Games
Gold medal – first place	2002 Busan	Singles C2
Gold medal – first place	2006 Kuala Lumpur	Singles C2
Asia and Oceania Championships
Gold medal – first place	2007 Seoul	Singles C2
Silver medal – second place	2005 Kuala Lumpur	Singles C2
Silver medal – second place	2007 Seoul	Teams C1–3
Silver medal – second place	2011 Hong Kong	Singles C2
FESPIC Championships
Gold medal – first place	1997 Hong Kong	Singles C1–2
Gold medal – first place	2003 Shanghai	Teams C5
Silver medal – second place	2001 Osaka	Singles C2

Korean name
- Hangul: 김경묵
- Hanja: 金慶默
- RR: Gim Gyeongmuk
- MR: Kim Kyŏngmuk

Kim Kyung-mook (Korean: 김경묵; born 19 February 1965) is a South Korean para table tennis player. He has medalled at every Paralympic Games from 1992 to 2016, for a total of four gold, three silver, and six bronze medals.

While climbing in 1985, he incurred a spinal injury. He began playing table tennis in 1988.
