= Cho Jae-kwan =

South Korean para table tennis player

Personal information
- Born: 5 October 1977 (age 48) Gwangju, South Korea
- Height: 177 cm (5 ft 10 in)

Sport
- Sport: Table tennis
- Playing style: Right-handed shakehand grip
- Disability class: 1
- Highest ranking: 4 (October 2008)
- Current ranking: 16 (February 2020)
Medal record
Men's para table tennis
Representing South Korea
Paralympic Games
Gold medal – first place	2004 Athens	Teams C3
Silver medal – second place	2008 Beijing	Singles C1
Bronze medal – third place	2008 Beijing	Teams C1–2
World Championships
Gold medal – first place	2006 Montreux	Teams C1
Gold medal – first place	2014 Beijing	Teams C1
FESPIC Games
Silver medal – second place	1999 Bangkok	Singles C1
Bronze medal – third place	2002 Busan	Singles C1
Asian Championships
Silver medal – second place	2005 Kuala Lumpur	Singles C1
Silver medal – second place	2007 Seoul	Singles C1
Silver medal – second place	2011 Hong Kong	Singles C1
Silver medal – second place	2013 Beijing	Singles C1
FESPIC Championships
Bronze medal – third place	1999 Taipei	Singles C1

Cho Jae-kwan (Korean: 조재관; RR: Jo Jaegwan, born 5 October 1977) is a South Korean para table tennis player. He won a gold medal at the 2004 Summer Paralympics, and a silver and a bronze at the 2008 Summer Paralympics.

He sustained a spinal injury in a swimming pool accident in 1993, when he was a high school student. He began playing table tennis in 1997.
