= Stefan Trofan =

British para table tennis player

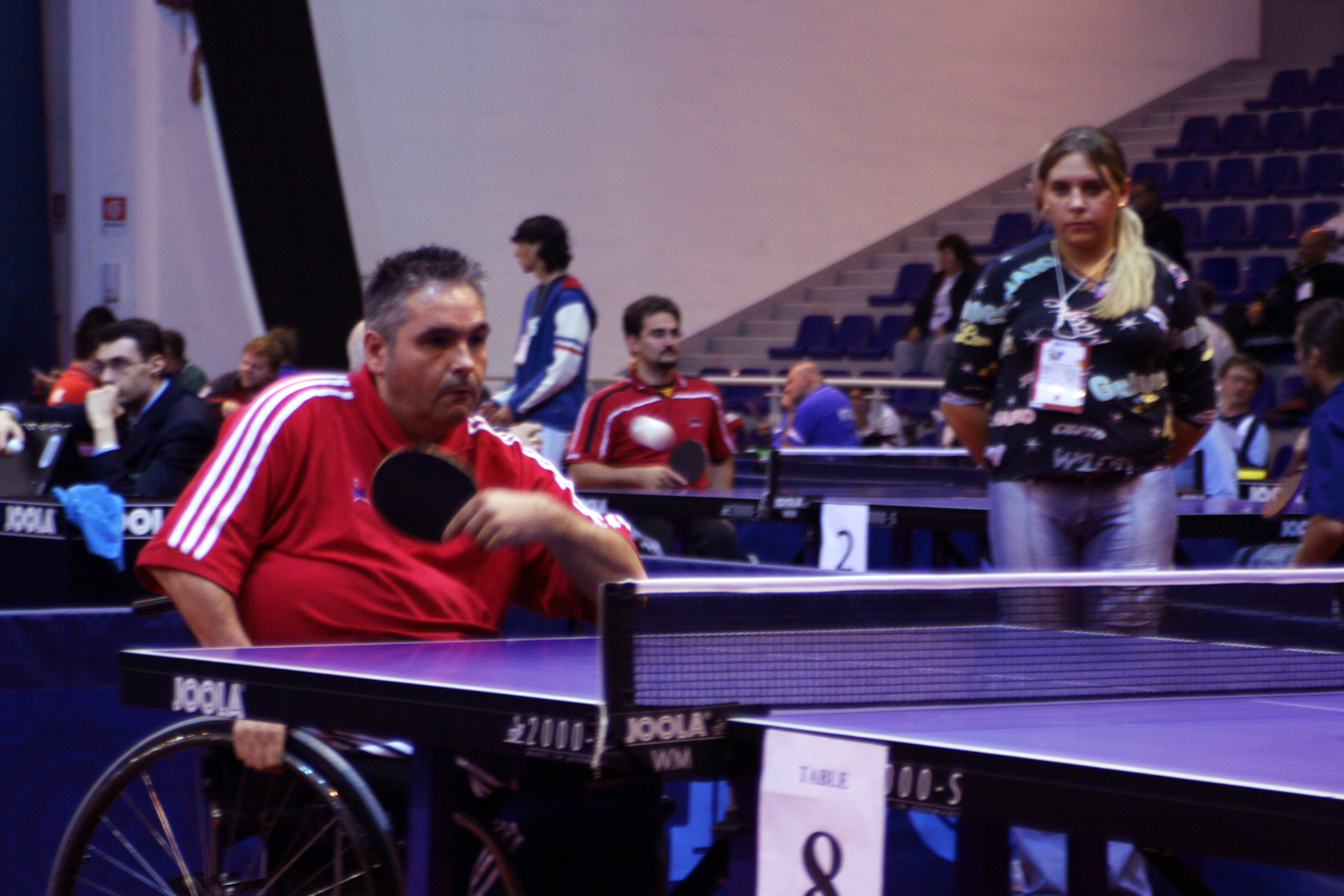

Personal information
- Born: 4 April 1962 Oldham, United Kingdom
- Died: 21 August 2008 (aged 46) Sheffield, United Kingdom

Sport
- Country: United Kingdom
- Sport: Para table tennis
- Disability: Spinal cord injury
- Disability class: C3
- Retired: 2005
Medal record
Table tennis
Representing United Kingdom
Paralympic Games
Silver medal – second place	2000 Sydney	Men's team C3
Silver medal – second place	2004 Athens	Men's team C3
European Championships
Gold medal – first place	1999 Piešťany	Men's team C3
Gold medal – first place	2005 Jesolo	Men's team C3
Silver medal – second place	2001 Frankfurt	Men's team C3

Stefan Trofan (4 April 1962 – 1 September 2008) was a British para table tennis player. In his childhood years, he was very interested in football and was a keen footballer, he was paralysed from the waist down aged 17 in a bike accident. He played alongside Neil Robinson and James Rawson in table tennis team events internationally. He coached Great Britain's Paralympic table tennis team for the 2008 Summer Paralympics.

He died of oesophageal cancer on 21 August 2008 in Sheffield surrounded by family, days before the Summer Paralympics in Beijing, China.
