= James Rawson =

British para table tennis player (1965–2024)

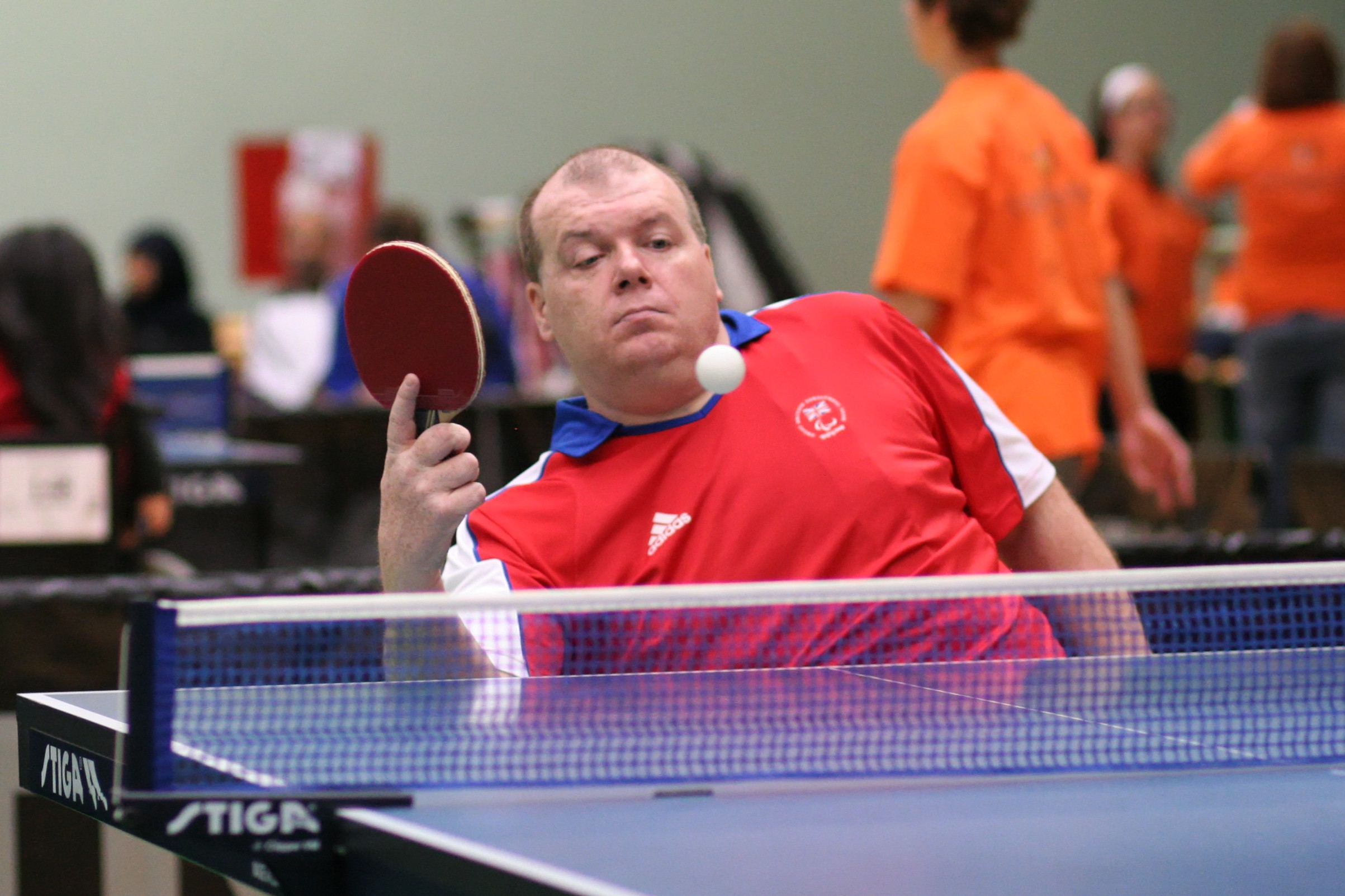
- Rawson in 2009

Personal information
- Nationality: English
- Born: 7 July 1965 Newark, Nottinghamshire, England
- Died: November 2024 (aged 59)

Sport
- Sport: Para table tennis
- Disability class: C3
Medal record
Para table tennis
Representing Great Britain
Paralympic Games
Gold medal – first place	1992 Barcelona	Men's teams C3
Silver medal – second place	2000 Sydney	Men's teams C3
Silver medal – second place	2004 Athens	Men's teams C3
Bronze medal – third place	1996 Atlanta	Men's teams C3
Bronze medal – third place	1996 Atlanta	Men's singles C3

James Rawson (7 July 1965 – November 2024) was a British para table tennis player who competed at every Summer Paralympic Games between 1984 and 2008, winning five medals. He has also competed at World Championships in Assen 1990, Taipei 2002 where he won team silver with Neil Robinson and individual bronze defeating Guertler from Germany.

== Table tennis career ==
Rawson won a gold medal in the men's team Class 3 event at the 1992 Barcelona Paralympics, alongside Neil Robinson and Phillip Evans, defeating Germany in the final.

At the 1996 Atlanta Paralympics, he won a bronze medal in the Class 3 team event, again with Robinson, and a further bronze in the Class 3 singles event, with Robinson taking the silver.

Rawson won silver in the Men's Class 3 team event at the 2000 Sydney Paralympics alongside Robinson and Stefan Trofan. The same trio retained their silver medal at the 2004 Athens Paralympics, losing in the gold medal match to South Korea.

Rawson competed at the 2008 Beijing Paralympics in the Men's individual Class 3 event without winning a medal; alongside Robinson and Arnie Chan he came fourth in the Men's team Class 3, losing the bronze medal match to host nation China.

== Personal life and death ==
Rawson was born in Newark, Nottinghamshire, England on 7 July 1965. On 7 November 2024, it was announced that Rawson had died at the age of 59.
