= Neil Robinson (table tennis) =

British para table tennis player

Neil Robinson MBE
Personal information
- Nationality: Welsh
- Born: 23 July 1958 (age 67) Bridgend, Wales
- Home town: Bridgend

Sport
- Country: Great Britain
- Sport: Para table tennis
- Disability: Spinal cord injury
- Disability class: C3
- Retired: 2008
Medal record
Para table tennis
Representing Great Britain
Paralympic Games
Gold medal – first place	1992 Barcelona	Men's teams C3
Silver medal – second place	1992 Barcelona	Men's singles C3
Silver medal – second place	1996 Atlanta	Men's singles C3
Silver medal – second place	2000 Sydney	Men's teams C3
Silver medal – second place	2004 Athens	Men's teams C3
Bronze medal – third place	1996 Atlanta	Men's teams C3
World Championships
Silver medal – second place	2002 Taipei	Men's teams C3
Bronze medal – third place	2006 Montreux	Men's singles C3
European Championships
Gold medal – first place	1995 Hillerød	Men's singles C3
Gold medal – first place	1999 Piešťany	Men's teams C3
Gold medal – first place	2003 Zagreb	Men's teams C3
Silver medal – second place	1995 Hillerød	Men's teams C3
Silver medal – second place	1999 Piešťany	Men's doubles C1-5
Silver medal – second place	2001 Frankfurt	Men's teams C3
Bronze medal – third place	1999 Piešťany	Men's singles C3
Bronze medal – third place	2005 Jesolo	Men's teams C5

Neil Robinson MBE (born 23 July 1958) is a retired para table tennis player from the United Kingdom. He participated in seven consecutive Paralympic Games and won team titles with Scott Robertson and James Rawson in both world and European championships.

He was appointed Member of the Most Excellent Order of the British Empire (MBE) in the 2012 New Year Honours for services to disabled sport.

== Paralympic career ==
At the 1992 Barcelona Paralympics, Robinson took silver in the Men's Singles Class 3 and gold in the Men's Teams Class 3 alongside James Rawson and Phillip Evans.

Robinson won the Class 3 individual silver again four years later at the 1996 Atlanta Paralympics, this time taking the bronze in the Class 3 team competition with Rawson.

At the 2000 Sydney Paralympics, Robinson won silver in the Men's Class 3 Team event with Rawson and Stefan Trofan. The same trio retained their silver medal at the 2004 Athens Paralympics, losing in the gold medal match to South Korea.

Robinson competed at the 2008 Beijing Paralympics in the Men's individual Class 3 event without winning a medal; alongside James Rawson he came fourth in the Men's team Class 3, losing the bronze medal match to host nation China.

After retiring from competition, Robinson became a coach for the Paralympics GB table tennis team.
