= Kim Min-gyu (table tennis) =

South Korean table tennis player (1977–2017)

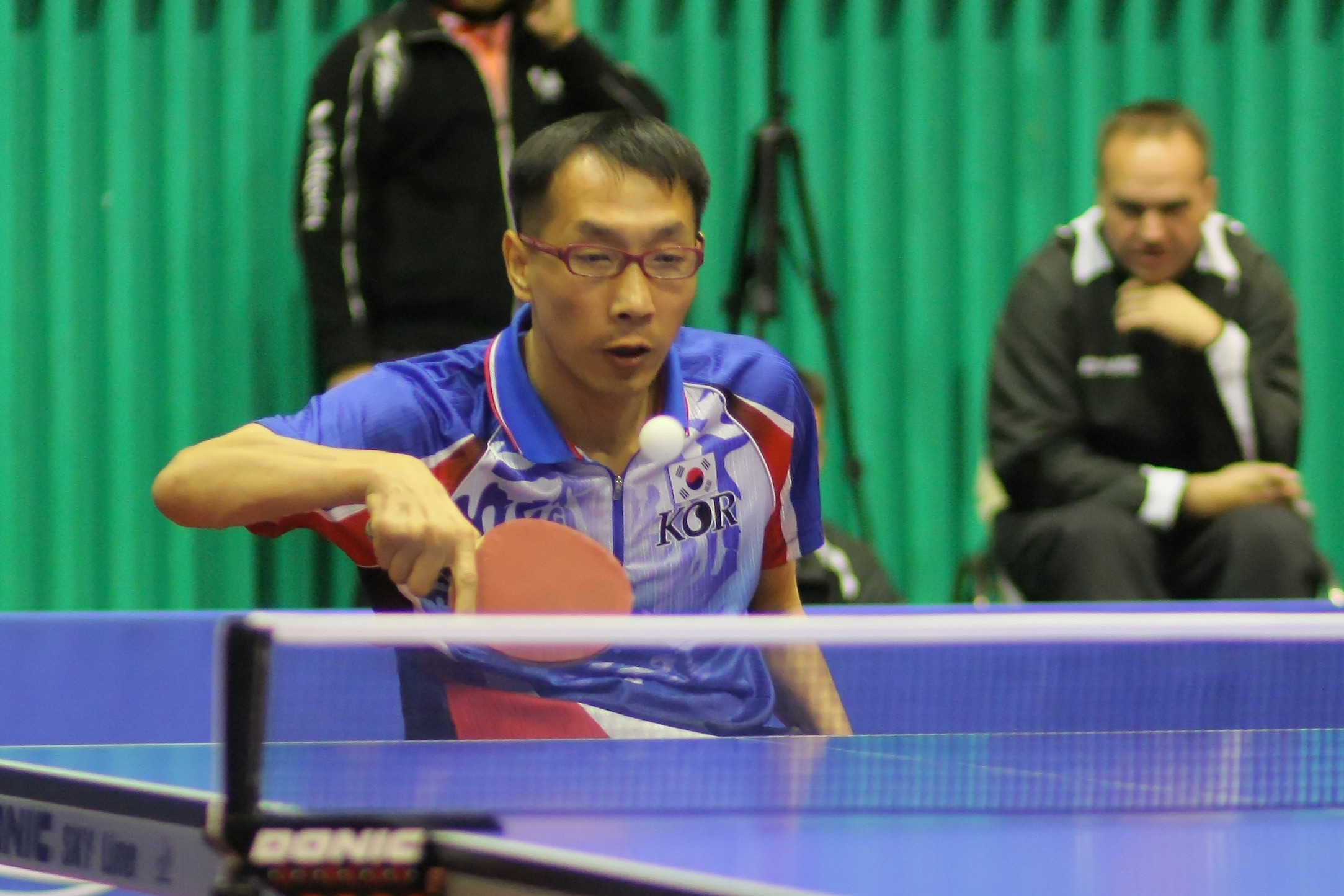
- Kim at the 2010 World Para Table Tennis Championships

Personal information
- Born: October 14, 1977 Jinju, South Gyeongsang, South Korea
- Died: April 3, 2017 (aged 39) Gwangsan District, Gwangju, South Korea

Sport
- Sport: Table tennis
- Playing style: Right-handed shakehand grip
- Disability class: 2
- Highest ranking: 1 (November 2014)
Medal record
Men's para table tennis
Representing South Korea
Paralympic Games
Bronze medal – third place	2012 London	Teams C1–2
World Championships
Silver medal – second place	2010 Gwangju	Singles C2
Silver medal – second place	2014 Beijing	Singles C2
Silver medal – second place	2014 Beijing	Teams C2
Bronze medal – third place	2010 Gwangju	Teams C1–2
Asian Para Games
Gold medal – first place	2014 Incheon	Singles C2
Bronze medal – third place	2014 Incheon	Teams C1–3
Asian Championships
Gold medal – first place	2011 Hong Kong	Singles C2
Gold medal – first place	2013 Beijing	Singles C2
Silver medal – second place	2009 Amman	Singles C1–2

Korean name
- Hangul: 김민규
- RR: Gim Mingyu
- MR: Kim Min'gyu

Kim Min-gyu (Korean: 김민규; 14 October 1977 – 3 April 2017) was a South Korean para table tennis player. He won a bronze medal at the 2012 Summer Paralympics.

He was found dead in 2017. He lived alone and drank alcohol the night before his death.
