= Ronan Rooney =

Irish Paralympic athlete

Personal information
- Born: 27 March 1960 (age 66) County Louth, Ireland

Sport
- Sport: Table tennis
Medal record
Track and field (athletics)
Representing Ireland
Paralympic Games
Bronze medal – third place	1984 New York/Stoke Mandeville	Marathon - 1B

Ronan Rooney (born March 27, 1960) is an Irish Paralympic athlete in table tennis who has competed in six Paralympic Games.

== Career ==
Born in Louth, Ireland in 1960, he became disabled after falling off a motorbike aged 18.

Formerly he was a track and field athlete who won Bronze in the men's marathon 1B at the 1984 Summer Paralympics. From 1988 onwards he has switched to singles and teams table tennis for Ireland. But not since then has he won another medal.

Ronan made his official return after a 12-year absence from the Paralympics in 2012, playing once again in men's singles and teams. This time, his wife, Rena McCarron Rooney, took part in women's table tennis, and they are believed to be the only married couple competing in the London Paralympics.
