= Egon Kramminger =

Austrian para table tennis player

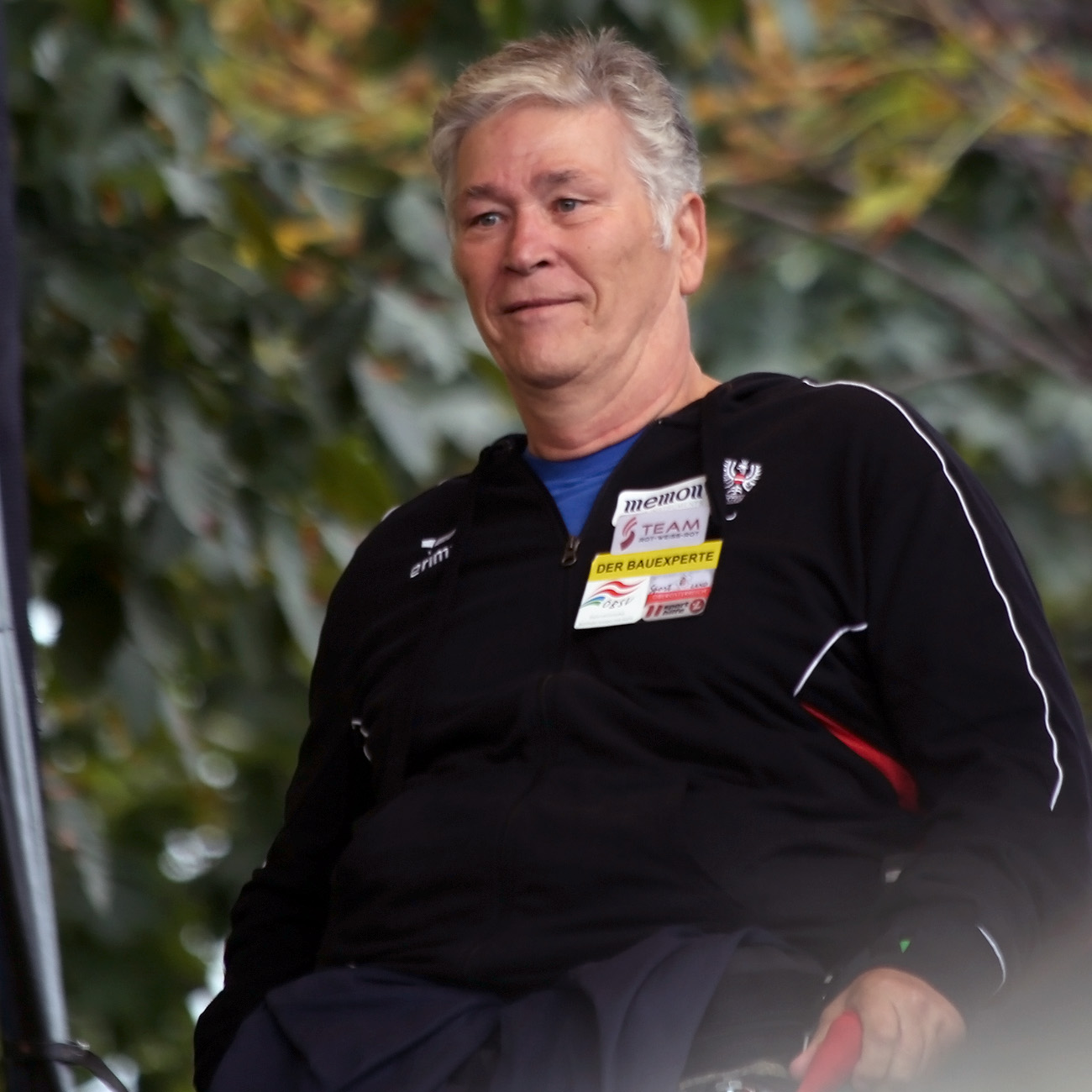
- Kramminger in 2013

Personal information
- Born: 5 August 1948 (age 77) St. Valentin, Austria

Sport
- Country: Austria
- Sport: Para table tennis
- Disability: Spinal cord injury
- Disability class: C3
Medal record
Para table tennis
Representing Austria
World Championships
Silver medal – second place	2010 Gwangju	Men's teams C3
Bronze medal – third place	2006 Montreux	Men's teams C3
Bronze medal – third place	2014 Beijing	Men's teams C3
World Team Championships
Bronze medal – third place	2017 Bratislava	Men's teams C3
European Championships
Gold medal – first place	1995 Hillerod	Men's teams C3
Silver medal – second place	2005 Jesolo	Men's teams C3
Silver medal – second place	2007 Kranjska Gora	Men's singles C3
Silver medal – second place	2009 Genoa	Men's teams C3
Silver medal – second place	2013 Lignano	Men's teams C3
Silver medal – second place	2015 Vejle	Men's teams C3
Bronze medal – third place	1997 Stockholm	Men's teams C4
Bronze medal – third place	1999 Piešťany	Men's teams C3
Bronze medal – third place	2001 Frankfurt	Men's teams C3
Bronze medal – third place	2007 Kranjska Gora	Men's teams C3
Bronze medal – third place	2011 Split	Men's teams C3
Bronze medal – third place	2017 Laško	Men's teams C3

Egon Kramminger (born 5 August 1948) is an Austrian para table tennis player. He is a four-time World medalist, 12-time European medalist and has participated at the Paralympic Games five times.

== Accident ==
On 9 September 1967, Kramminger crashed his car into a high voltage mast while driving tired and was thrown twenty metres out of his car. He had compression fractures on his fifth, sixth and seventh thoracic vertebrae and spent eleven months in a hospital in Bietigheim then was moved to five different hospitals in a span of five years. When he arrived at the Vienna General Hospital, he had a decubitus on his buttocks and was transferred to a rehabilitation centre in Tübingen. In 1972, his left leg got amputated followed by his right kidney, bladder, rectum and his right leg in 1985.

In the early 1990s, Kramminger discovered table tennis and began to compete internationally in 1995 where he won his first ever title when he won the European championships in Hillerød with Peter Starl and Manfred Dollmann.
