= Tomas Piñas =

Spanish para table tennis player

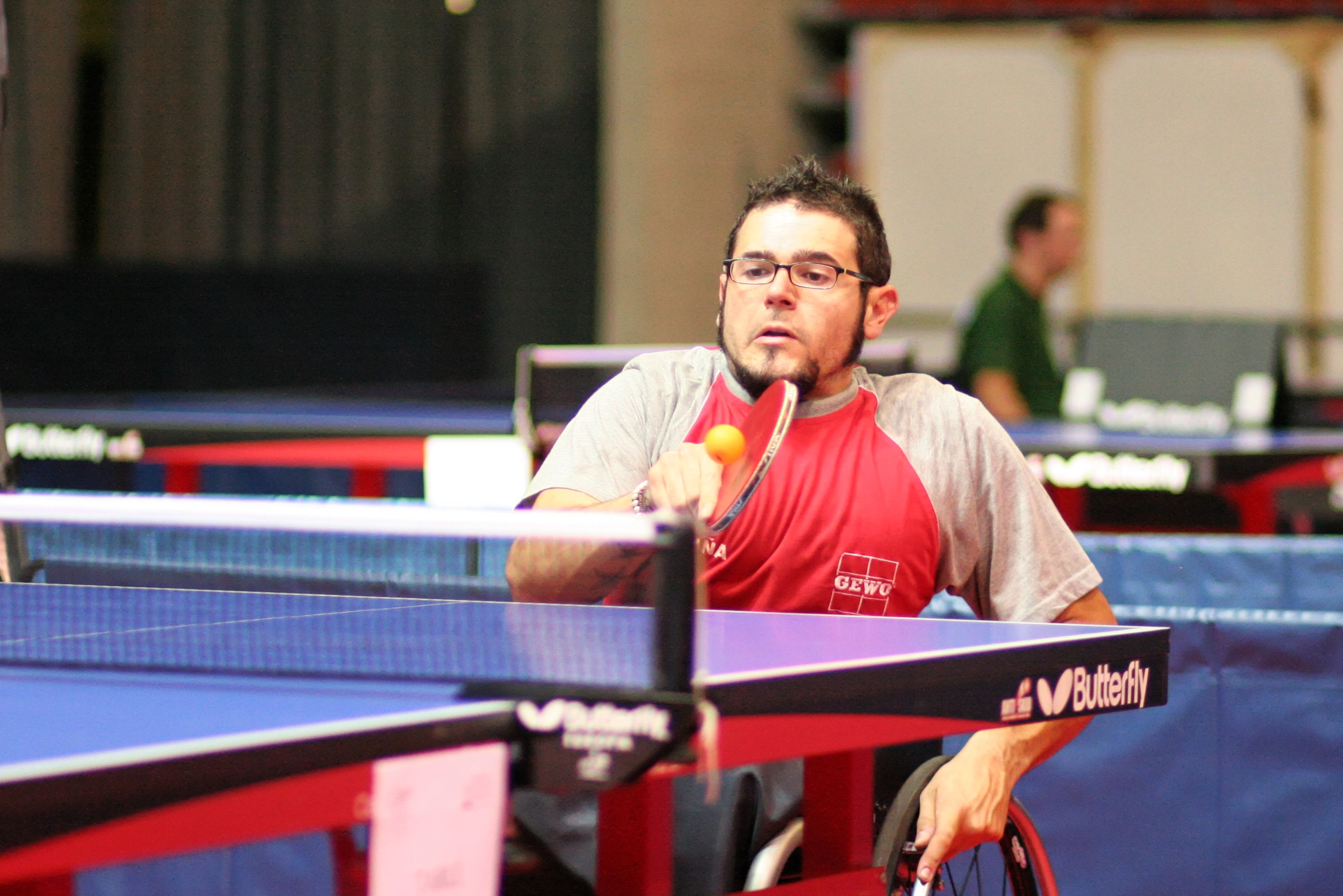

Personal information
- Nationality: Spanish
- Born: Tomas Piñas Bermudez; 8 July 1982 (age 43) Granada, Spain

Sport
- Country: Spain
- Sport: Table tennis (class 3)
Medal record
Table tennis
Representing Spain
Paralympic Games
Bronze medal – third place	2008 Beijing	Class 3 singles

Tomas Piñas Bermudez (born 8 July 1982 in Granada) is a class 3 wheel chair using para table tennis player from Spain. In 2012, he lived in Ogijares, Granada. He played table tennis at the 2004, 2008 and 2012 Summer Paralympics. In 2008, he finished third in the class 3 singles table tennis game.
