= Ján Riapoš =

Slovakian para table tennis player (born 1968)

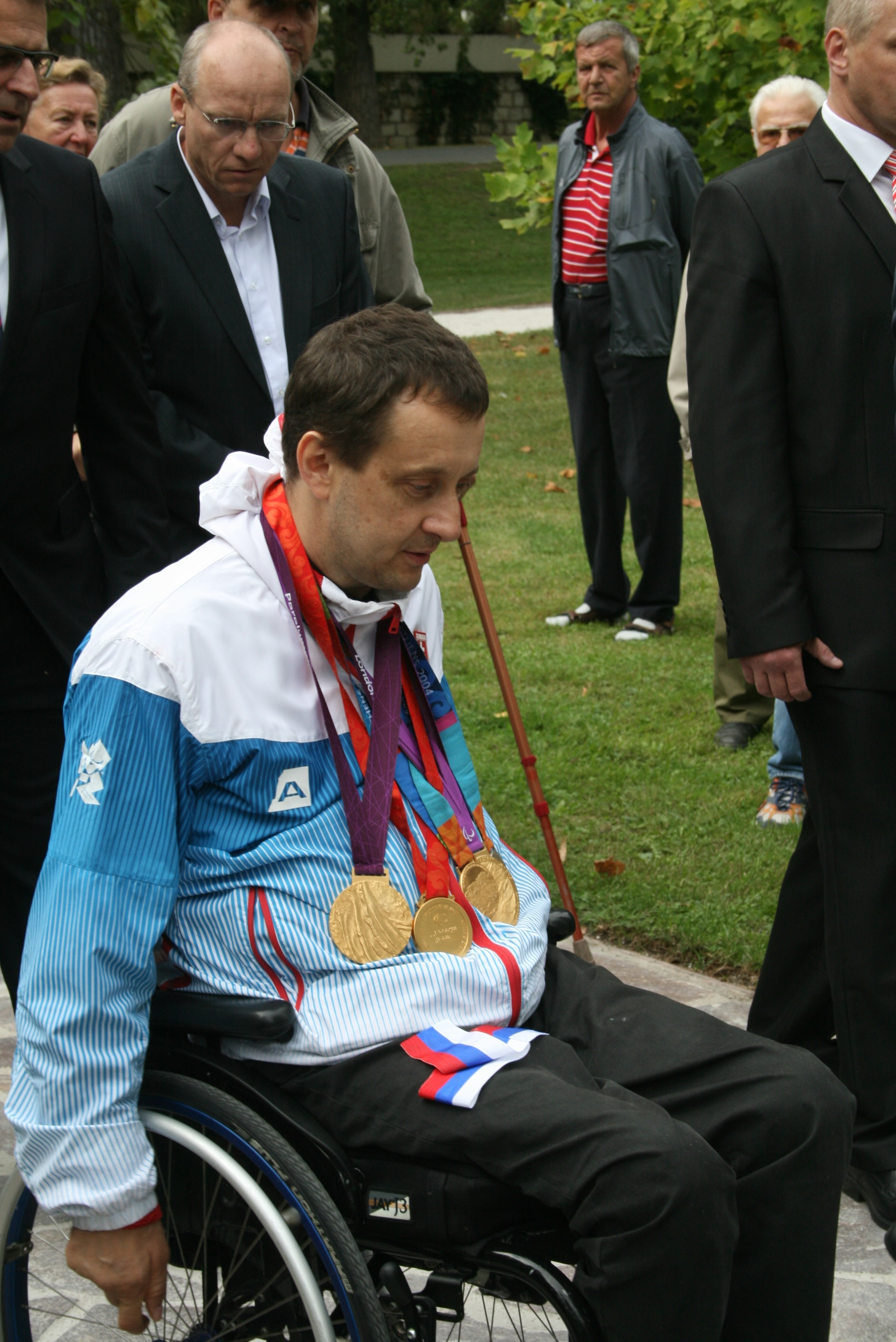
- Riapoš at Opening ceremony of Walk of Fame Paraolympionics in Piešťany, 14 September 2012

Personal information
- Born: 28 September 1968 (age 58) Helpa, Czechoslovakia
- Home town: Bratislava, Slovakia
- Height: 194 cm (6 ft 4 in)

Sport
- Country: Slovakia
- Sport: Para table tennis
- Disability: Spinal cord injury
- Disability class: C2
- Club: KV Piešťany
- Coached by: Saša Draga
Medal record
Para table tennis
Representing Slovakia
Paralympic Games
Gold medal – first place	2004 Athens	Men's singles C2
Gold medal – first place	2008 Beijing	Men's team C1-2
Gold medal – first place	2012 London	Men's singles C2
Gold medal – first place	2012 London	Men's team C1-2
Gold medal – first place	2024 Paris	Men's doubles MD4
Silver medal – second place	2004 Athens	Men's team C1-2
Bronze medal – third place	2020 Tokyo	Men's team C1-2
World Championships
Gold medal – first place	2010 Gwangju	Men's team C1-2
Bronze medal – third place	2006 Montreux	Men's team C2
Bronze medal – third place	2014 Beijing	Men's singles C2
European Championships
Gold medal – first place	1999 Piešťany	Men's singles C2
Gold medal – first place	2001 Frankfurt	Men's singles C2
Gold medal – first place	2003 Zagreb	Men's singles C2
Gold medal – first place	2005 Jesolo	Men's singles C2
Gold medal – first place	2005 Jesolo	Men's teams C2
Gold medal – first place	2007 Kranjska Gora	Men's singles C2
Gold medal – first place	2007 Kranjska Gora	Men's teams C2
Gold medal – first place	2009 Genoa	Men's singles C2
Gold medal – first place	2009 Genoa	Men's teams C2
Gold medal – first place	2011 Split	Men's teams C2
Gold medal – first place	2017 Lasko	Men's teams C2
Silver medal – second place	2003 Zagreb	Men's teams C1-2
Silver medal – second place	2011 Split	Men's singles C2
Silver medal – second place	2013 Lignano	Men's teams C2
Silver medal – second place	2015 Vejle	Men's teams C2
Bronze medal – third place	2013 Lignano	Men's singles C2

Ján Riapoš (born 28 September 1968) is a Slovak para table tennis player. He is currently ranked world number four in sports class 2 and world number 61 in wheelchair sports category. He was involved in a car accident in 1993 and sustained a spinal cord injury. He uses a wheelchair all the time.

== Career ==
Riapoš made his Paralympic debut at the 1996 Summer Paralympics in Atlanta. He competed at every Summer Paralympics from then until 2024, eight Games in total, which is a Slovak record. At the 2024 Summer Paralympics in Paris he and Peter Lovaš won the men's doubles MD4 event, beating the top-seeded South Korean pair 3–1 in the final. It was his fifth Paralympic gold medal and his seventh Paralympic medal overall.

By 2025 Riapoš had won 19 medals at the European Championships and four at the World Championships. At the 2025 European Championships in Helsingborg he won silver in the singles and gold in the doubles with Lovaš. He is the chairman of the Slovak Paralympic Committee and of the Slovak Association of Physically Disabled Athletes.
