= Rastislav Revúcky =

Slovak para table tennis player

Personal information
- Nickname: Kakao
- Born: 17 May 1978 (age 48) Rožňava, Czechoslovakia
- Home town: Zarnovica, Slovakia
- Height: 180 cm (5 ft 11 in)

Sport
- Country: Slovakia
- Sport: Para table tennis
- Disability: Disability
- Disability class: C2
- Coached by: Sasa Dragas
- Retired: 2016
Medal record
Para table tennis
Representing Slovakia
Paralympic Games
Gold medal – first place	2008 Beijing	Men's team C1-2
Gold medal – first place	2012 London	Men's team C1-2
Silver medal – second place	2004 Athens	Men's team C1-2
World Championships
Gold medal – first place	2010 Gwangju	Men's team C1-2
Bronze medal – third place	2006 Montreux	Men's team C2
European Championships
Gold medal – first place	2005 Gesolo	Men's team C2
Gold medal – first place	2007 Kranjska Gora	Men's team C2
Gold medal – first place	2009 Genoa	Men's team C2
Gold medal – first place	2011 Split	Men's team C2
Silver medal – second place	2003 Zagreb	Men's singles C2
Silver medal – second place	2003 Zagreb	Men's teams C1-2
Silver medal – second place	2013 Lignano	Men's teams C2
Silver medal – second place	2015 Vejle	Men's teams C2

Rastislav Revúcky (born 17 May 1978) is a Slovak former para table tennis player who won four European titles along with Ján Riapoš in team events.
