= Stéphane Molliens =

French para table tennis player

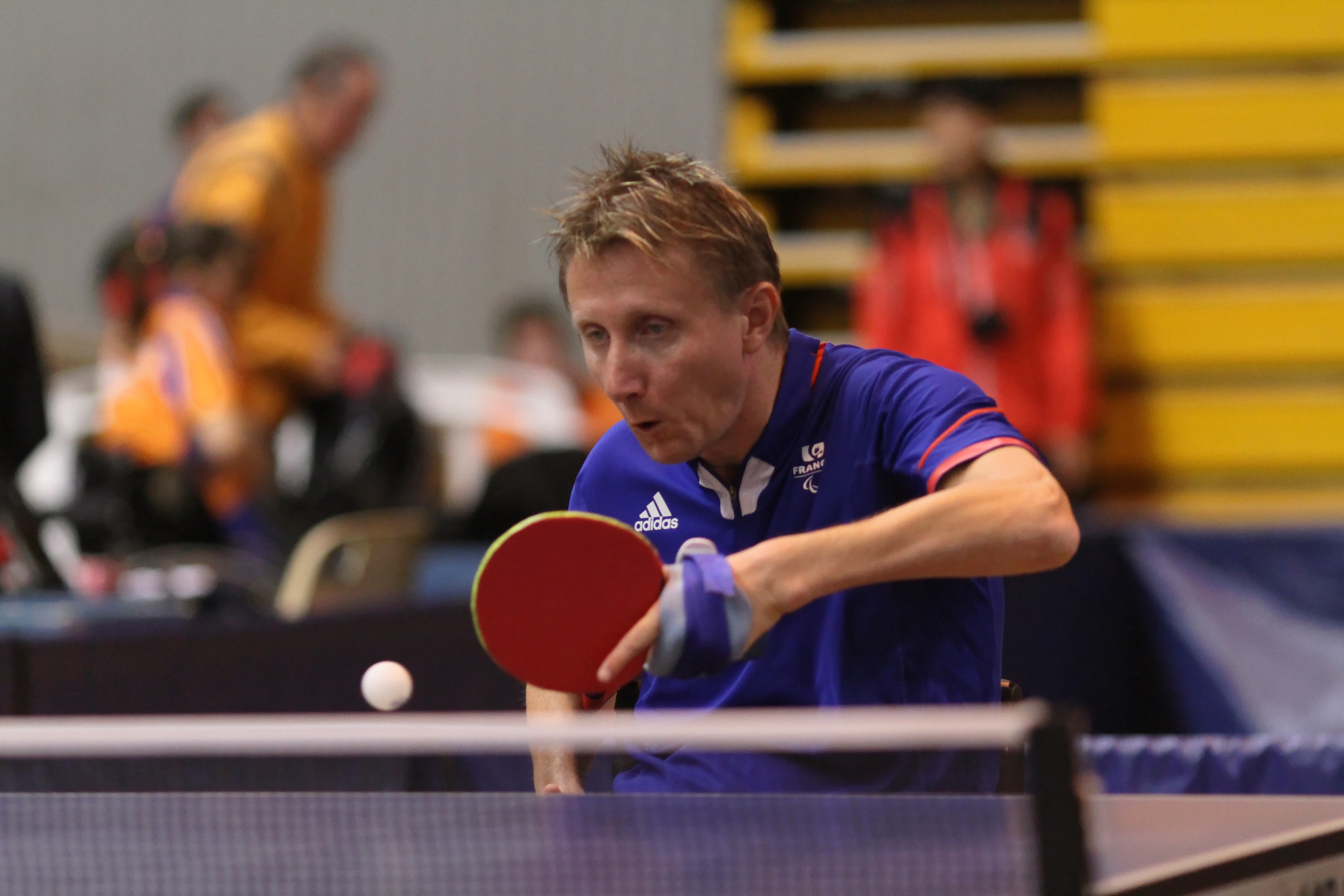
- Molliens at 2014 World Championships

Personal information
- Nickname: Steph
- Nationality: French
- Born: 23 September 1974 (age 51) Arras, France
- Height: 185 cm (6 ft 1 in)

Sport
- Country: France
- Sport: Para table tennis
- Disability: Spinal cord injury
- Disability class: C2
- Club: MMH
- Coached by: Boll Emmanuel; Elodie Vachet
Medal record
Para table tennis
Representing France
Paralympic Games
Gold medal – first place	2016 Rio de Janeiro	Men's teams C1-2
Silver medal – second place	2008 Beijing	Men's singles C2
Silver medal – second place	2008 Beijing	Men's teams C1-2
Silver medal – second place	2012 London	Men's teams C1-2
World Championships
Gold medal – first place	2014 Beijing	Men's teams C2
Silver medal – second place	2006 Montreux	Men's teams C2
Silver medal – second place	2010 Gwangju	Men's teams C1-2
Bronze medal – third place	2018 Lasko	Men's singles C2
World Team Championships
Silver medal – second place	2017 Bratislava	Men's teams C2
European Championships
Gold medal – first place	2003 Zagreb	Men's teams C1-2
Gold medal – first place	2011 Split	Men's singles C2
Gold medal – first place	2013 Lignano	Men's teams C2
Gold medal – first place	2015 Vejle	Men's teams C2
Silver medal – second place	2005 Gesolo	Men's teams C2
Silver medal – second place	2007 Kranjska Gora	Men's singles C2
Silver medal – second place	2009 Genoa	Men's singles C2
Silver medal – second place	2009 Genoa	Men's teams C2
Silver medal – second place	2011 Split	Men's teams C2
Bronze medal – third place	2005 Gesolo	Men's singles C2
Bronze medal – third place	2015 Vejle	Men's singles C2
Bronze medal – third place	2017 Lasko	Men's teams C2

Stéphane Molliens (born 23 September 1974) is a French para table tennis player who has won multiple European para table tennis championship team medals with Vincent Boury, Jean-François Ducay and Fabien Lamirault.
