= Andreas Vevera =

Austrian Paralympic table tennis player

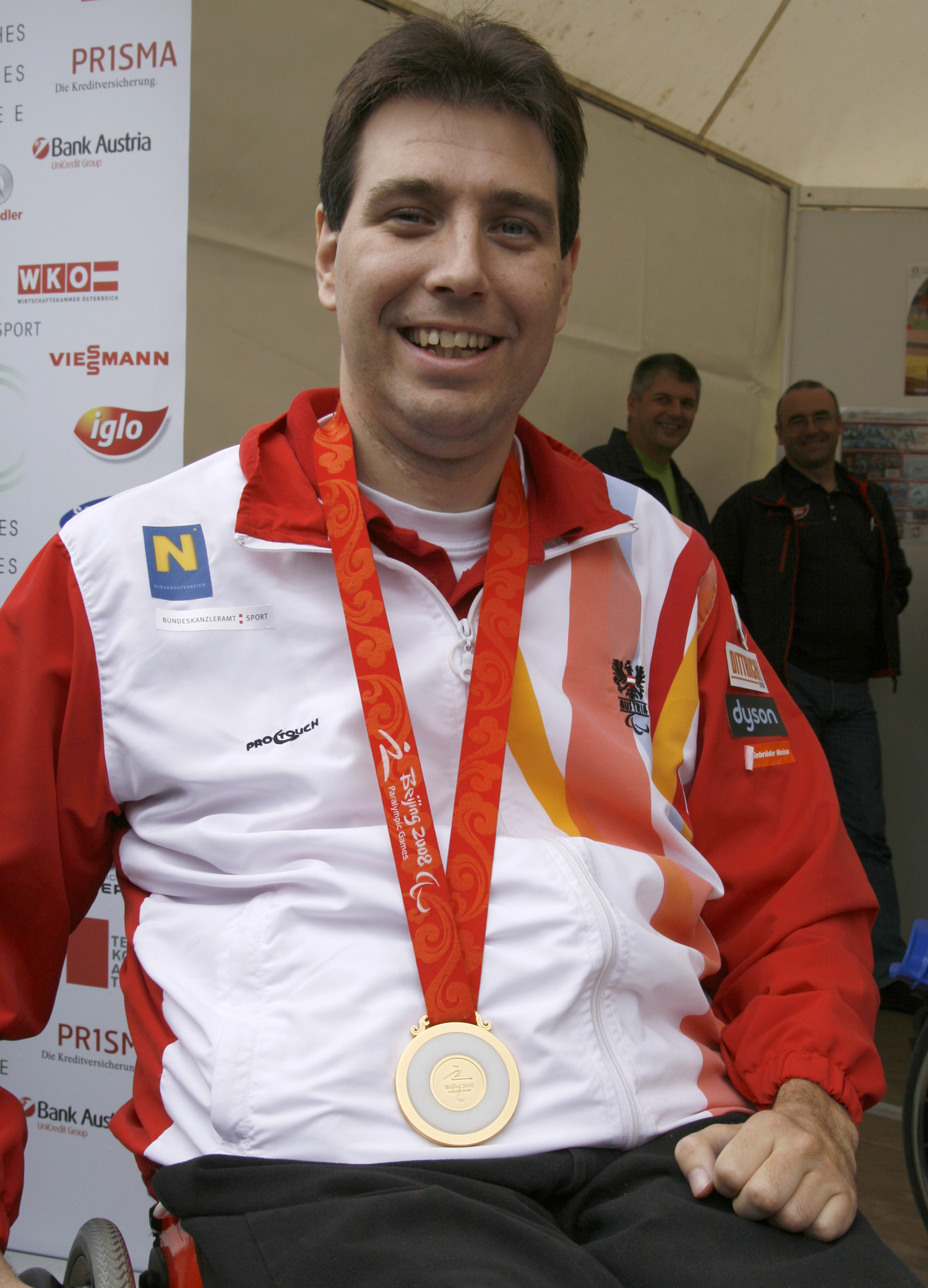
- Vevera wearing his gold medal at the 2008 Summer Paralympics

Personal information
- Born: 21 September 1971 (age 54) Vienna, Austria

Sport
- Country: Austria
- Sport: Para table tennis
- Disability class: C1
- Retired: 2017
Medal record
Para table tennis
Representing Austria
Paralympic Games
Gold medal – first place	2008 Beijing	Men's singles C1
World Championships
Silver medal – second place	2006 Montreux	Men's singles C1
Bronze medal – third place	2010 Gwangju	Men's singles C1
European Championships
Gold medal – first place	2007 Kranjska Gora	Men's singles C1
Gold medal – first place	2011 Split	Men's singles C1
Silver medal – second place	2007 Kranjska Gora	Men's teams C2
Silver medal – second place	2009 Genoa	Men's singles C1
Bronze medal – third place	2009 Genoa	Men's teams C2
Bronze medal – third place	2011 Split	Men's teams C2
Bronze medal – third place	2013 Vejle	Men's teams C2

Andreas Vevera (born 24 September 1971) is a former Austrian para table tennis player and a gold medalist in table tennis at the 2008 Summer Paralympics. He represented Austria and played in the men's individual class 1. His motto is "Give everyday your best."
