= Walter Kilger =

German para table tennis player

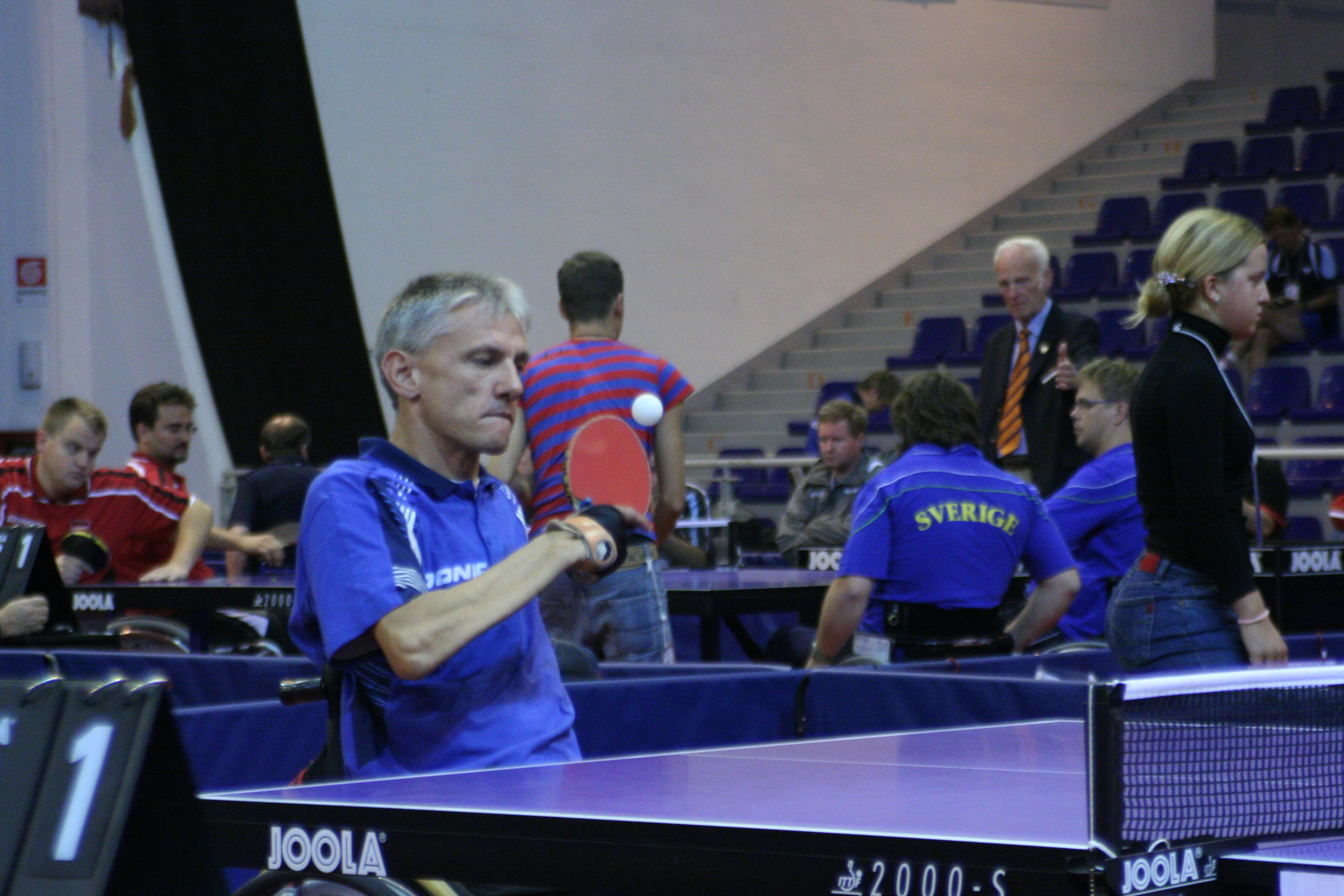
- Kilger in 2005

Personal information
- Born: 7 April 1962 (age 64) Gotteszell, Germany

Sport
- Country: Germany
- Sport: Para table tennis
- Disability: Paraplegia
- Disability class: C1
Medal record
Para table tennis
Representing Germany
Paralympic Games
| Bronze medal – third place | 2004 Athens | Singles C1 |
| Bronze medal – third place | 2004 Athens | Teams C1-2 |
World Championships
| Silver medal – second place | 2006 Montreux | Teams C1 |
European Championships
| Gold medal – first place | 2005 Jesolo | Teams C1 |
| Gold medal – first place | 2007 Kranjska Gora | Teams C1 |
| Gold medal – first place | 2009 Genoa | Teams C1 |
| Silver medal – second place | 1999 Frankfurt | Singles C1 |
| Bronze medal – third place | 2003 Zagreb | Teams C1-2 |
| Bronze medal – third place | 2005 Jesolo | Singles C1 |
| Bronze medal – third place | 2007 Kranjska Gora | Singles C1 |

Walter Kilger (born 7 April 1962) is a German former para table tennis player. He is a three-time European champion, World silver medalist and a Paralympic bronze medalist. He was member of the German paralympic tabletennis team at the Paralympics 2000 in Sydney, 2004 in Peking and 2008. and won 2 bronze medals. He was decorated by the President of the Federal Republic of Germany with the Silver Laurel Leaf, Germany's highest sport award. (translation: since 1992 all the winners of medals at Paralympic Games were also decorated with the Silver Laural Leaf)
