= Jan Gürtler =

German para table tennis player

Personal information
- Born: 6 February 1970 (age 56) Haale, East Germany
- Height: 1.70 m (5 ft 7 in)

Sport
- Country: Germany
- Sport: Para table tennis
- Disability class: C3
- Club: RSC Berlin
Medal record
Para table tennis
Representing Germany
Paralympic Games
Silver medal – second place	1992 Barcelona	Men's teams C3
Silver medal – second place	2012 London	Men's teams C3
Bronze medal – third place	1996 Atlanta	Men's teams C3
World Championships
Silver medal – second place	1998 Paris	Men's singles C3
World Team Championships
Bronze medal – third place	2017 Bratislava	Men's teams C5
European Championships
Gold medal – first place	2011 Split	Men's teams C3
Gold medal – first place	2013 Lignano	Men's teams C3
Silver medal – second place	2017 Lasko	Men's teams C5
Bronze medal – third place	1997 Stockholm	Men's teams C3
Bronze medal – third place	2001 Frankfurt	Men's singles C3
Bronze medal – third place	2009 Genoa	Men's singles C3
Bronze medal – third place	2015 Vejle	Men's singles C3
Bronze medal – third place	2015 Vejle	Men's teams C4
Bronze medal – third place	2019 Helsingborg	Men's teams C5

Jan Gürtler (transliterated Guertler, born 6 February 1970) is a German para table tennis player who competes in international level events. He is a World silver medalist, a double European champion and three-time Paralympic medalist in team events.
