= Hans Ruep =

Austrian para table tennis player

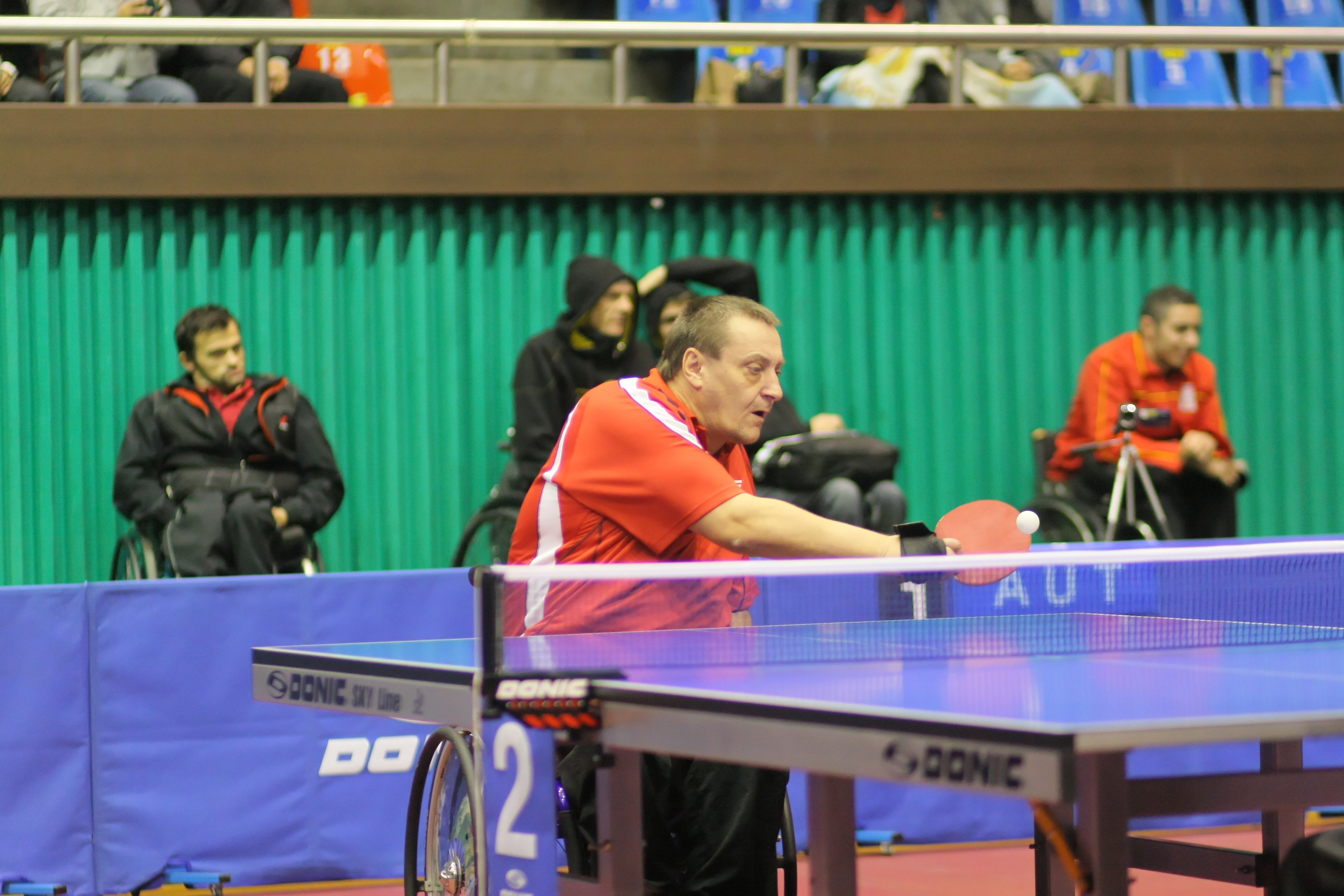
- Ruep at 2010 World Championships

Personal information
- Born: 18 June 1960 (age 66) Wels, Austria

Sport
- Country: Austria
- Sport: Para table tennis
- Disability: Tetraplegia
- Disability class: C2
Medal record
Para table tennis
Representing Austria
World Championships
Silver medal – second place	2002 Taipei	Men's teams C1-2
Bronze medal – third place	1998 Paris	Men's teams C1-2
European Championships
Silver medal – second place	1995 Hillerød	Men's teams C2
Silver medal – second place	1997 Stockholm	Men's singles C2
Silver medal – second place	1999 Piešťany	Men's teams C1-2
Silver medal – second place	2001 Frankfurt	Men's teams C1-2
Silver medal – second place	2007 Kranjska Gora	Men's teams C2
Bronze medal – third place	1997 Stockholm	Men's teams C1-2
Bronze medal – third place	1999 Piešťany	Men's singles C2
Bronze medal – third place	2009 Genoa	Men's teams C2
Bronze medal – third place	2011 Split	Men's teams C2
Bronze medal – third place	2013 Lignano	Men's teams C2

Hans Ruep (born 18 June 1960) is an Austrian retired para table tennis player who competed at international level events. He is a double World medalist, ten-time European medalist and has competed at the Paralympic Games four times where he reached the bronze medal match in the men's team event at the 2008 Summer Paralympics with Andreas Vevera when they lost to South Korea.
