= Manfred Dollmann =

Austrian para table tennis player

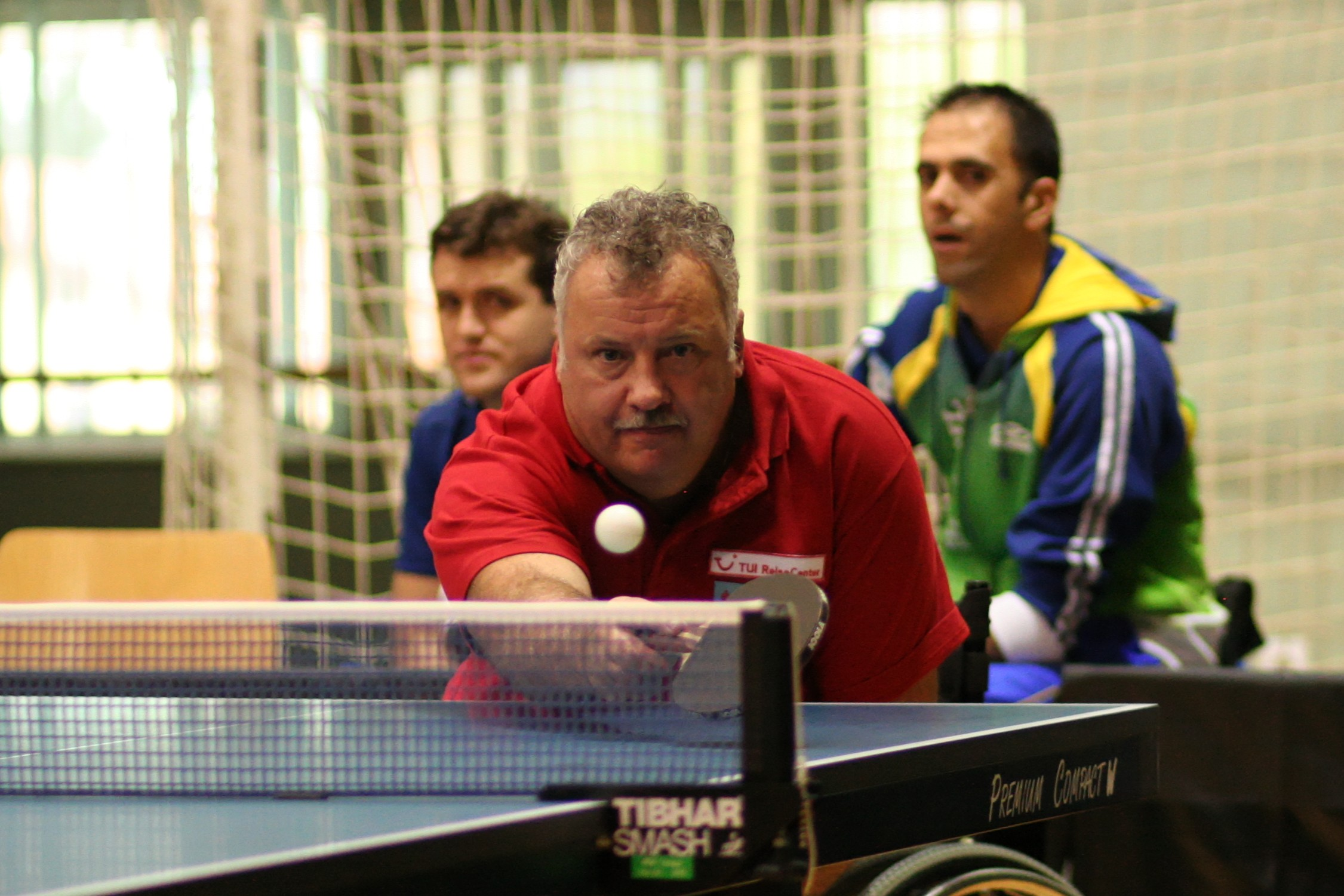
- Dollmann in 2008

Personal information
- Born: 31 August 1964 (age 61)

Sport
- Country: Austria
- Sport: Para table tennis
- Disability: Spinal cord injury
- Disability class: C3
Medal record
Para table tennis
Representing Austria
Paralympic Games
| Silver medal – second place | 1996 Atlanta | Men's teams C3 |
| Bronze medal – third place | 1992 Barcelona | Men's teams C5 |
World Championships
| Gold medal – first place | 1990 Assen | Men's teams C3 |
| Silver medal – second place | 1998 Paris | Men's teams C3 |
| Silver medal – second place | 2010 Gwangju | Men's teams C3 |
| Bronze medal – third place | 2014 Beijing | Men's teams C3 |
World Team Championships
| Bronze medal – third place | 2017 Bratislava | Men's teams C3 |
European Championships
| Gold medal – first place | 1991 Salou | Men's teams C3 |
| Gold medal – first place | 1995 Hillerød | Men's teams C3 |
| Silver medal – second place | 2005 Jesolo | Men's teams C3 |
| Silver medal – second place | 2009 Genoa | Men's teams C3 |
| Silver medal – second place | 2013 Lignano | Men's teams C3 |
| Bronze medal – third place | 1991 Salou | Men's singles C3 |
| Bronze medal – third place | 1995 Hillerød | Men's singles C3 |
| Bronze medal – third place | 1997 Stockholm | Men's open singles |
| Bronze medal – third place | 1997 Stockholm | Men's singles C3 |
| Bronze medal – third place | 1997 Stockholm | Men's teams C3 |
| Bronze medal – third place | 1999 Piešťany | Men's teams C3 |
| Bronze medal – third place | 2001 Frankfurt | Men's teams C3 |
| Bronze medal – third place | 2007 Kranjska Gora | Men's teams C3 |
| Bronze medal – third place | 2011 Split | Men's teams C3 |
| Bronze medal – third place | 2017 Laško | Men's teams C3 |

Manfred Dollmann (born 31 August 1964) is an Austrian para table tennis player who competes in international level events. He is a double European champion, five-time World medalist and has participated at the Paralympic Games seven times winning two medals.

When Dollmann was 16, he was riding his moped too fast and he slipped on a road bend then landed on his back on a stone on a small stream bed resulting in paraplegia.
