= Vincent Boury =

French para table tennis player

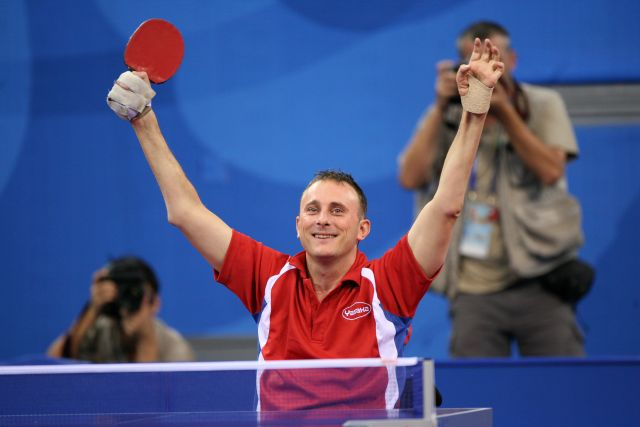

Personal information
- Born: 21 June 1969 (age 57) Colmar, France
Medal record
Table tennis
Representing France
Paralympic Games
Gold medal – first place	2008 Beijing	Class 2
Silver medal – second place	1996 Atlanta	Class 2
Silver medal – second place	2012 London	Team Class 1–2
Bronze medal – third place	2000 Sydney	Class 2

Vincent Boury (born 21 June 1969 in Colmar) is a French table tennis player.

He represented France at the 2008 Summer Paralympics, in class 2, and beat fellow French competitor Stéphane Molliens to win gold.

He had previously won a silver medal at the 1996 Summer Paralympics, and a bronze at the 2000 Games. He has also been vice-world champion in 1998, 2002 and 2006, and won the team event at the 2002 World Cup.

Boury works as a security engineer.
