= Table tennis at the 2016 Summer Paralympics – Qualification =

This article details the qualifying phase for table tennis at the 2016 Summer Paralympics. The competition at these Games included 276 athletes coming from their respective NPCs. 31 (20 male, 11 female) were selected by the Bipartite Commission. A further 55 male and 50 female quota places were reserved for continental competition.

The remaining 99 male and 41 female players earned places for the Games through the world ranking list prepared by ITTF that concluded on December 31, 2015.

== Men ==
The following achieved the necessary ranking by the final date, and were invited to the Rio 2016 Games.

Class 1

Section	Places	NOC	Qualified player
African Qualifier	1	-	
Asian Qualifier	1	-	
American Qualifier	1	Brazil	Aloisio Lima
European Qualifier	1	Great Britain	Robert Davies
Oceania Qualifier	1	-	
ITTF World Ranking List (as of December 21, 2015)	6(+3)*	Great Britain	Paul Davies
ITTF World Ranking List (as of December 21, 2015)	6(+3)*	France	Jean-François Ducay
ITTF World Ranking List (as of December 21, 2015)	6(+3)*	South Korea	Kiwon Nam
ITTF World Ranking List (as of December 21, 2015)	6(+3)*	Germany	Holger Nikelis
ITTF World Ranking List (as of December 21, 2015)	6(+3)*	South Korea	Young Dae Joo
ITTF World Ranking List (as of December 21, 2015)	6(+3)*	South Korea	Lee Chang-ho
ITTF World Ranking List (as of December 21, 2015)	6(+3)*	Italy	Andrea Borgato
ITTF World Ranking List (as of December 21, 2015)	6(+3)*	Argentina	Fernando Emanuel Eberhardt
ITTF World Ranking List (as of December 21, 2015)	6(+3)*	Hungary	Endre Major
Bipartite Commission	1	Hungary	Silvio Keller
Total	12		

- 3 untaken regional places transferred to the ranking list.

Class 2

Section	Places	NOC	Qualified player
African Qualifier	1	-	
Asian Qualifier	1	South Korea	Soo Yong Cha
American Qualifier	1	Brazil	Iranildo Conceicao Espindola
European Qualifier	1	France	Fabien Lamirault
Oceania Qualifier	1	-	
ITTF World Ranking List (as of December 21, 2015)	8(+2)*	Poland	Rafal Czuper
ITTF World Ranking List (as of December 21, 2015)	8(+2)*	Slovakia	Jan Riapos
ITTF World Ranking List (as of December 21, 2015)	8(+2)*	France	Stephane Molliens
ITTF World Ranking List (as of December 21, 2015)	8(+2)*	Ukraine	Oleksandr Yezyk
ITTF World Ranking List (as of December 21, 2015)	8(+2)*	Czech Republic	Jiri Suchanek
ITTF World Ranking List (as of December 21, 2015)	8(+2)*	Slovakia	Martin Ludrovsky
ITTF World Ranking List (as of December 21, 2015)	8(+2)*	South Korea	Kyung-Mook Kim
ITTF World Ranking List (as of December 21, 2015)	8(+2)*	Serbia	Goran Perlic
ITTF World Ranking List (as of December 21, 2015)	8(+2)*	Slovakia	Ratislav Revucky
ITTF World Ranking List (as of December 21, 2015)	8(+2)*	China	Yan Ming Gao
Bipartite Commission	2	Brazil; Italy	Guilherme Marcio Da Costa; Giuseppe Vella
Total	15		

- 2 untaken regional places transferred to the ranking list.
