= Cuba at the 2024 Summer Paralympics =

- IPC code: CUB
- NPC: Comité Paralimpico Cubano

in Paris, France August 28, 2024 – September 8, 2024
- Competitors: 21 in 8 sports
- Flag bearers: Omara Durand; Robiel Yankiel Sol Cervantes
- Medals Ranked 24th: Gold 6 Silver 3 Bronze 1 Total 10

Summer Paralympics appearances (overview)
- 1992; 1996; 2000; 2004; 2008; 2012; 2016; 2020; 2024

Cuba competed at the 2024 Summer Paralympics in Paris, France, from 28 August to 8 September.

== Medalists ==
| Medal | Name | Sport | Event | Date |
|---|---|---|---|---|
| Gold | Robiel Yankiel Sol Cervantes | Athletics | Men's long jump T47 | 3 September |
| Gold | Omara Durand | Athletics | Women's 400 metres T12 | 3 September |
| Gold | Guillermo Varona | Athletics | Men's javelin throw F46 | 3 September |
| Gold | Omara Durand | Athletics | Women's 100 metres T12 | 5 September |
| Gold | Yunier Fernández | Table tennis | Men's individual – Class 1 | 6 September |
| Gold | Omara Durand | Athletics | Women's 200 metres T12 | 7 September |
| Silver | Yamel Luis Vives Suares | Athletics | Men's 100 metres T44 | 1 September |
| Silver | Pablo Ramírez Barrientos | Powerlifting | Men's 54 kg | 4 September |
| Silver | Sheyla Hernández Estupiñán | Judo | Women's +70 kg J2 | 7 September |
| Bronze | Ulicer Aguilera Cruz | Athletics | Men's javelin throw F13 | 5 September |

== Competitors ==
The following is the list of number of competitors in the Games.

| Sport | Men | Women | Total |
|---|---|---|---|
| Archery | 0 | 1 | 1 |
| Athletics | 6 | 3 | 9 |
| Judo | 0 | 1 | 1 |
| Powerlifting | 1 | 0 | 1 |
| Shooting | 2 | 1 | 3 |
| Swimming | 1 | 1 | 2 |
| Table tennis | 1 | 0 | 1 |
| Taekwondo | 1 | 2 | 3 |
| Total | 12 | 9 | 21 |

== Archery ==
| Athlete | Event | Ranking Round | | Round of 32 | Round of 16 | Quarterfinals | Semifinals | Finals | |
| Athlete | Event | Score | Seed | Opposition Score | Opposition Score | Opposition Score | Opposition Score | Opposition Score | Rank |
|---|---|---|---|---|---|---|---|---|---|
| Leydis Lazara Posada Cañizares | Women's individual recurve | 456 | 23 | Sengul (TUR); L 0–6 | Did not advance | | | | |

== Athletics ==
Cuban track and field athletes achieved quota places for the following events based on their results at the 2023 World Championships, 2024 World Championships, or through high performance allocation, as long as they meet the minimum entry standard (MES).

Key

- Note–Ranks given for track events are within the athlete's heat only
- Q = Qualified for the next round
- q = Qualified for the next round as a fastest loser or, in field events, by position without achieving the qualifying target
- DQ = Disqualified
- PR = Paralympic Record
- AR = Area (or continental) Record
- NR = National Record
- SB = Season's Best
- N/A = Round not applicable for the event
- Bye = Athlete not required to compete in round

Track & road events

| Athlete | Event | Heat | | Semifinal | | Final | |
| Athlete | Event | Result | Rank | Result | Rank | Result | Rank |
|---|---|---|---|---|---|---|---|
| Yamel Luis Vives Suares | Men's 100 m T44 | — | | | | 11.20 | 2nd place, silver medalist(s) |
| Raciel Gonzalez Isidora | Men's 100 m T47 | 10.74 | 2 Q | — | | 10.93 | 6= |
| Omara Durand | Women's 100 m T12 | 11.87 | 1 Q | 12.01 | 1 Q | 11.81 | 1st place, gold medalist(s) |
| Omara Durand | Women's 200 m T12 | 24.78 | 1 Q | 24.41 | 1 Q | 23.62 | 1st place, gold medalist(s) |
| Omara Durand | Women's 400 m T12 | 55.36 | 1 Q | 54.77 | 1 Q | 53.59 | 1st place, gold medalist(s) |

Field events

| Athlete | Event | Final | |
| Athlete | Event | Distance | Position |
|---|---|---|---|
| Robiel Yankiel Sol Cervantes | Men's long jump T47 | 7.41 | 1st place, gold medalist(s) |
| Ulicer Aguilera Cruz | Men's javelin throw F13 | 62.51 | 3rd place, bronze medalist(s) |
| Ever René Castro Martinez | Men's javelin throw F41 | 34.34 | 5 |
| Guillermo Varona | Men's javelin throw F46 | 66.14 | 1st place, gold medalist(s) |
| Hechavarria Ferrer Felipa Isis | Women's long jump T47 | 5.15 | 8 |
| Noraivis de las Heras Chibas | Women's shot put F64 | 10.34 | 8 |

== Judo ==
| Athlete | Event | Round of 16 | Quarterfinals | Semifinals | Repechage | Final / BM | |
| Athlete | Event | Opposition Result | Opposition Result | Opposition Result | Opposition Result | Opposition Result | Rank |
|---|---|---|---|---|---|---|---|
| Sheyla Hernández Estupiñán | Women's +70 kg J2 | — | Gosens (AUS); W 10–0 | Wang (CHN); W 11–0 | — | Silva (BRA); L 0–11 | 2nd place, silver medalist(s) |

== Powerlifting ==
| Athlete | Event | Attempts (kg) | | | | Result (kg) | Rank |
| Athlete | Event | 1 | 2 | 3 | 4 | Result (kg) | Rank |
|---|---|---|---|---|---|---|---|
| Pablo Ramírez Barrientos | Men's 54 kg | ~~184~~ | 185 | ~~187~~ | — | 185 | 2nd place, silver medalist(s) |

== Shooting ==
Cuba entered three para-shooter's after achieved quota places for the following events by virtue of their best finishes at the 2022, 2023 and 2024 world cup, 2022 World Championships, 2023 World Championships and 2023 Parapan American Games, as long as they obtained a minimum qualifying score (MQS) by July 15, 2024.

| Athlete | Event | Qualification | | Final | |
| Athlete | Event | Points | Rank | Points | Rank |
|---|---|---|---|---|---|
| Di Angelo Loriga Rodriguez | P1 –Men's 10 m air pistol SH1 | 497-2x | 26 | Did not advance | |
| Alexander Reyna Jerez | P1 –Men's 10 m air pistol SH1 | 562-12x | 7 Q | 194.0 | 4 |
| Yenigladys Suarez Echevarria | P2 –Women's 10 m air pistol SH1 | 534-6x | 14 | Did not advance | |

Mixed

| Athlete | Event | Qualification | | Final | |
| Athlete | Event | Points | Rank | Points | Rank |
|---|---|---|---|---|---|
| Yenigladys Suarez Echevarria | P3 – 25 m pistol SH1 | 531-6x | 24 | Did not advance | |
| Di Angelo Loriga Rodriguez | P4 – 50 m pistol SH1 | 510-3x | 24 | Did not advance | |
| Alexander Reyna Jerez | P4 – 50 m pistol SH1 | 531-6x | 11 | Did not advance | |

== Swimming ==
| Athlete | Event | Heats | | Final | |
| Athlete | Event | Result | Rank | Result | Rank |
|---|---|---|---|---|---|
| Yosjaniel Hernandez Velez | Men's 50 m freestyle S7 | 30.79 | 12 | Did not advance | |
| Yosjaniel Hernandez Velez | Men's 400 m freestyle S7 | 5:26.56 | 9 | Did not advance | |
| Yosjaniel Hernandez Velez | Men's 200 metre individual medley SM7 | 2:54.71 | 10 | Did not advance | |
| Lorenzo Perez Escalona | Men's 100 m freestyle S6 | 1:12.95 | 11 | Did not advance | |
| Lorenzo Perez Escalona | Men's 400 m freestyle S6 | 5:17.87 | 4 Q | 5:23.52 | 7 |

== Table tennis ==
Cuba secure one single spot for the Paralympic games. Yunier Fernández qualified for Paris 2024 by virtue of his gold medal results, in men's class 1, through the 2023 Parapan American Games in Santiago, Chile.

| Athlete | Event | Round of 16 | Quarterfinals | Semifinals | Final / BM | |
| Athlete | Event | Opposition Result | Opposition Result | Opposition Result | Opposition Result | Rank |
|---|---|---|---|---|---|---|
| Yunier Fernández | Men's individual C1 | Raslan (EGY); W 3–0 | Matthews (GBR); W 3–1 | Falco (ITA); W 3–2 | Davies (GBR); W 3–0 | 1st place, gold medalist(s) |

== Taekwondo ==
Cuba entered three athletes to compete at the Paralympics competition. Michel Suárez Walker (men's under 70 kg), Lilisbet Rodriguez Rivero (women's under 47 kg) and Lidia Montes de Oca (women's above 65 kg) qualified for the games, each by winning the gold medal, in their respective classes, at the 2024 Pan American Qualification Tournament in Santo Domingo, Dominican Republic, marking the nation's debut ai these sports.

| Athlete | Event | First round | Quarterfinals | Semifinals | Repechage 1 | Repechage 2 | Final / BM | |
| Athlete | Event | Opposition Result | Opposition Result | Opposition Result | Opposition Result | Opposition Result | Opposition Result | Rank |
|---|---|---|---|---|---|---|---|---|
| Michel Suárez Walker | Men's −70 kg | Boli (CIV); W 18–17 | Khalilov (AZE); L 2–12 | — | | Garcia Lopez (MEX); L 10–17 | Did not advance | |
| Lilisbet Rodriguez Rivero | Women's −47 kg | Khudadadi (RPT); L 11–21 | Did not advance | | | | | |
| Lidia Montes de Oca | Women's +65 kg | Rašić (SRB); L 4–13 | Did not advance | | | | | |

== See also ==
- Cuba at the 2024 Summer Olympics
- Cuba at the Paralympics
