= Table tennis at the 2016 Summer Paralympics – Men's individual – Class 1 =

Table tennis at the XV Paralympic Games
- Venue: Riocentro Pavilion 3
- Dates: 8–13 September 2016
- Competitors: 12 from 9 nations

Medalists
| 1st place, gold medalist(s) | | Rob Davies | Great Britain |
| 2nd place, silver medalist(s) | | Joo Young-dae | South Korea |
| 3rd place, bronze medalist(s) | | Nam Ki-won | South Korea |

The men's individual table tennis – class 1 tournament at the 2016 Summer Paralympics in Rio de Janeiro took place during 8–13 September 2016 at Riocentro Pavilion 3. Classes 1–5 were for athletes with a physical impairment that affected their legs, and who competed in a sitting position. The lower the number, the greater the impact the impairment was on an athlete's ability to compete.

In the preliminary stage, athletes competed in four groups of three. Winners and runners-up of each group qualified to the quarterfinals.

== Results ==
All times are local time in UTC-3.

=== Finals ===
==== Main bracket ====
Quarter-finals
A1 | Rob Davies (GBR) | 13 | 11 | 22
B2 | Jean-François Ducay (FRA) | 11 | 4 | 20
D2 | Endre Major (HUN) | 10 | 13 | 11 | 8 | 11
C1 | Lee Chang-ho (KOR) | 12 | 11 | 8 | 11 | 8
D1 | Joo Young-dae (KOR) | 11 | 11 | 11
A2 | Andrea Borgato (ITA) | 7 | 7 | 3
C2 | Paul Davies (GBR) | 8 | 10 | 4
B1 | Nam Ki-won (KOR) | 11 | 12 | 11

Semi-finals
A1 | Rob Davies (GBR) | 11 | 11 | 8 | 14
D2 | Endre Major (HUN) | 5 | 7 | 11 | 12
D1 | Joo Young-dae (KOR) | 11 | 8 | 11 | 9 | 11
B1 | Nam Ki-won (KOR) | 7 | 11 | 7 | 11 | 7

Finals
A1 | Rob Davies (GBR) | 14 | 4 | 11 | 11
D1 | Joo Young-dae (KOR) | 12 | 11 | 9 | 5

==== Bronze medal match ====
| Bronze medal match |
| D2 | Endre Major (HUN) | 9 | 11 | 6 | 11 |
| B1 | Nam Ki-won (KOR) | 11 | 4 | 11 | 13 |

=== Preliminary round ===
| Qualified for the semi-finals |

==== Group A ====
| Seed | Athlete | Won | Lost | Points diff |
|---|---|---|---|---|
| 1 | Rob Davies (GBR) | 2 | 0 | +14 |
| 8 | Andrea Borgato (ITA) | 1 | 1 | +8 |
| 10 | Silvio Keller (SUI) | 0 | 2 | −22 |

8 September, 15:00

| Rob Davies (GBR) | 13 | 11 | 11 | 9 | 11 |
| Silvio Keller (SUI) | 11 | 4 | 13 | 11 | 2 |

9 September, 11:20

| Rob Davies (GBR) | 11 | 5 | 11 | 6 | 11 |
| Andrea Borgato (ITA) | 5 | 11 | 9 | 11 | 8 |

10 September, 09:20

| Andrea Borgato (ITA) | 11 | 9 | 11 | 11 |
| Silvio Keller (SUI) | 9 | 11 | 8 | 6 |

==== Group B ====
| Seed | Athlete | Won | Lost | Points diff |
|---|---|---|---|---|
| 6 | Nam Ki-won (KOR) | 2 | 0 | +19 |
| 2 | Jean-François Ducay (FRA) | 1 | 1 | +10 |
| 9 | Fernando Eberhardt (ARG) | 0 | 2 | -29 |

8 September, 15:00

| Jean-François Ducay (FRA) | 11 | 11 | 11 |
| Fernando Eberhardt (ARG) | 7 | 3 | 6 |

9 September, 11:20

| Jean-François Ducay (FRA) | 9 | 8 | 10 |
| Nam Ki-won (KOR) | 11 | 11 | 12 |

10 September, 09:20

| Nam Ki-won (KOR) | 11 | 12 | 11 |
| Fernando Eberhardt (ARG) | 6 | 10 | 6 |

==== Group C ====
| Seed | Athlete | Won | Lost | Points diff |
|---|---|---|---|---|
| 3 | Lee Chang-ho (KOR) | 2 | 0 | +18 |
| 7 | Paul Davies (GBR) | 1 | 1 | -10 |
| 12 | Aloisio Lima (BRA) | 0 | 2 | -16 |

8 September, 15:00

| Lee Chang-ho (KOR) | 11 | 11 | 11 |
| Aloisio Lima (BRA) | 6 | 8 | 1 |

9 September, 11:20

| ' Lee Chang-ho (KOR) | 11 | 8 | 11 | 11 |
| Paul Davies (GBR) | 7 | 11 | 8 | 7 |

10 September, 09:20

| Paul Davies (GBR) | 7 | 11 | 11 | 5 | 14 |
| Aloisio Lima (BRA) | 11 | 7 | 9 | 11 | 12 |

==== Group D ====
| Seed | Athlete | Won | Lost | Points diff |
|---|---|---|---|---|
| 5 | Joo Young-dae (KOR) | 2 | 0 | +20 |
| 11 | Endre Major (HUN) | 1 | 1 | +7 |
| 4 | Holger Nikelis (GER) | 0 | 2 | -27 |

8 September, 15:00

| Holger Nikelis (GER) | 5 | 12 | 6 | 2 |
| Endre Major (HUN) | 11 | 10 | 11 | 11 |

9 September, 11:20

| Holger Nikelis (GER) | 9 | 6 | 17 |
| Joo Young-dae (KOR) | 11 | 11 | 19 |

10 September, 09:20

| Joo Young-dae (KOR) | 12 | 12 | 11 |
| Endre Major (HUN) | 10 | 10 | 4 |
