= Table tennis at the 2012 Summer Paralympics – Men's individual – Class 1 =

Table Tennis at the XIV Paralympic Games
- Venue: ExCeL Exhibition Centre
- Dates: August 30-September 3, 2012
- Competitors: 12 from 9 nations

Medalists
1st place, gold medalist(s)		Holger Nikelis	Germany
2nd place, silver medalist(s)		Jean-François Ducay	France
3rd place, bronze medalist(s)		Paul Davies	Great Britain

The Men's individual table tennis – Class 1 tournament at the 2012 Summer Paralympics in London took place from 30 August to 3 September 2012 at ExCeL Exhibition Centre. Classes 1-5 were for athletes with a physical impairment that affected their legs who competed in a sitting position. The lower the number, the greater the impact the impairment was on an athlete’s ability to compete.

In the preliminary stage, athletes competed in four groups of three. Winners of each group qualified for the semi-finals.

== Results ==
All times are local (BST/UTC+1)

=== Finals ===
Semifinals: 1 Sep 17:30
A1	Jean-Francois Ducay (FRA)	11	13	11
D1	Lee Chang Ho (KOR)	8	11	9
C1	Paul Davies (GBR)	3	8	8
B1	Holger Nikelis (GER)	11	11	11

Gold-medal match: 3 Sep 11:45
A1	Jean-Francois Ducay (FRA)	4	6	11	6
B1	Holger Nikelis (GER)	11	11	3	11
Bronze-medal match
D1	Lee Chang Ho (KOR)	11	7	12	5	8
C1	Paul Davies (GBR)	9	11	10	11	11

=== Preliminary round ===
Qualified for the semifinals

==== Group A ====
Athlete	Won	Lost	Games won	Points diff
Jean-Francois Ducay (FRA)	2	0	6	+15
Philip Quinlan (IRL)	0	2	0	-28
Robert Davies (GBR)	1	1	5	+13

30 August, 13:40

Jean-Francois Ducay (FRA)	11	11	11
Philip Quinlan (IRL)	7	3	9

31 August, 12:20

Philip Quinlan (IRL)	6	6	7
Robert Davies (GBR)	11	11	11

1 September, 10:20

Jean-Francois Ducay (FRA)	11	11	4	8	11
Robert Davies (GBR)	5	8	11	11	9

==== Group B ====
Athlete	Won	Lost	Games won	Points diff
Holger Nikelis (GER)	2	0	6	+18
Silvio Keller (SUI)	1	1	0	-8
Cho Jae Kwan (KOR)	0	2	2	-10

30 August, 13:40

Holger Nikelis (GER)	11	11	11
Silvio Keller (SUI)	5	7	8

31 August, 12:20

Silvio Keller (SUI)	5	11	11	11
Cho Jae Kwan (KOR)	11	8	6	8

1 September, 10:20

Holger Nikelis (GER)	13	15	8	11
Cho Jae Kwan (KOR)	11	13	11	7

==== Group C ====
Athlete	Won	Lost	Games won	Points diff
Paul Davies (GBR)	2	0	6	+12
Andreas Vevera (AUT)	1	1	5	+18
Andrea Borgato (ITA)	0	2	0	-30

30 August, 13:40

Andreas Vevera (AUT)	11	11	11
Andrea Borgato (ITA)	8	3	6

31 August, 12:20

Andrea Borgato (ITA)	6	5	8
Paul Davies (GBR)	11	11	11

1 September, 10:20

Andreas Vevera (AUT)	5	11	11	10	8
Paul Davies (GBR)	11	7	2	12	11

==== Group D ====
Athlete	Won	Lost	Games won	Points diff
Lee Chang Ho (KOR)	2	0	6	+18
Fernando Eberhardt (ARG)	1	1	4	-13
Jérôme Guézénec (FRA)	0	2	3	-5

30 August, 13:40

Lee Chang Ho (KOR)	11	11	9	11
Fernando Eberhardt (ARG)	7	6	11	8

31 August, 12:20

Fernando Eberhardt (ARG)	12	8	5	15	11
Jérôme Guézénec (FRA)	10	11	11	13	9

1 September, 10:20

Lee Chang Ho (KOR)	11	7	11	11
Jérôme Guézénec (FRA)	7	11	9	5
