= Table tennis at the 2024 Summer Paralympics – Men's individual – Class 1 =

Men's singles MS1 at the XVII Paralympic Games
- Venue: South Paris Arena 4, Paris
- Dates: 3 – 6 September 2024
- Competitors: 9 from 6 nations

Medalists
1st place, gold medalist(s)		Yunier Fernández	Cuba
2nd place, silver medalist(s)		Rob Davies	Great Britain
3rd place, bronze medalist(s)		Federico Falco	Italy
3rd place, bronze medalist(s)		Endre Major	Hungary

The men's doubles – Class 1 tournament at the 2024 Summer Paralympics in Paris took place between 3 and 6 September 2024 at South Paris Arena 4.

== Schedule ==
The schedules were as below:

P	Preliminary round	¼	Quarter-finals	½	Semi-finals	G	Gold medal match

Events	Dates					
Events	Tue 3 Sep		Wed 4 Sep		Fri 6 Sep	
Events	M	E	M	E	M	E
Men's singles MS1	P	¼		½	G	

== Results ==
=== Gold medal match ===
Gold medal match
7	Yunier Fernández (CUB)	14	11	11
6	Rob Davies (GBR)	12	7	4

=== Top half ===
Round of 16
7	Yunier Fernández (CUB)	11	11	11
9	Eslam Raslan (EGY)	5	5	5

Quarter-finals
1	Joo Young-dae (KOR)	8	6	11	11	7
5	Federico Falco (ITA)	11	11	9	7	11
7	Yunier Fernández (CUB)	11	10	11	11
4	Thomas Matthews (GBR)	5	12	4	9

Semi-finals
5	Federico Falco (ITA)	13	6	11	12	2
7	Yunier Fernández (CUB)	15	11	4	10	11

=== Bottom half ===
Round of 16

Quarter-finals
3	Endre Major (HUN)	4	11	11	12
8	Andrea Borgato (ITA)	11	6	7	10
6	Rob Davies (GBR)	11	11	8	3	11
2	Kim Hak-jin (KOR)	9	5	11	11	8

Semi-finals
3	Endre Major (HUN)	6	6	11	14
6	Rob Davies (GBR)	11	11	9	16
