= Argentina at the 2016 Summer Paralympics =

- IPC code: ARG
- NPC: Argentine Paralympic Committee
- Website: www.coparg.org.ar

in Rio de Janeiro
- Competitors: 82 in 15 sports
- Flag bearer: Gustavo Fernandez
- Medals Ranked 54th: Gold 1 Silver 1 Bronze 3 Total 5

Summer Paralympics appearances (overview)
- 1960; 1964; 1968; 1972; 1976; 1980; 1984; 1988; 1992; 1996; 2000; 2004; 2008; 2012; 2016; 2020; 2024

Argentina competed at the 2016 Summer Paralympics in Rio de Janeiro, Brazil, from 7 to 18 September 2016. Wheelchair tennis player Gustavo Fernandez was chosen to carry the nation's flag at the opening ceremony.

== Disability classifications ==
Every participant at the Paralympics has their disability grouped into one of five disability categories; amputation, the condition may be congenital or sustained through injury or illness; cerebral palsy; wheelchair athletes, there is often overlap between this and other categories; visual impairment, including blindness; Les autres, any physical disability that does not fall strictly under one of the other categories, for example dwarfism or multiple sclerosis. Each Paralympic sport then has its own classifications, dependent upon the specific physical demands of competition. Events are given a code, made of numbers and letters, describing the type of event and classification of the athletes competing. Some sports, such as athletics, divide athletes by both the category and severity of their disabilities, other sports, for example swimming, group competitors from different categories together, the only separation being based on the severity of the disability.

== Medalists ==
The following Argentine competitors won medals at the games. In the by discipline sections below, medalists' names are bolded.

Medal	Name	Sport	Event	Date
Gold	Yanina Andrea Martinez	Athletics	Women's 100m T36	September 9
Silver	Hernan Emanuel Urra	Athletics	Shot put F35	September 12
Bronze	Hernan Barreto	Athletics	Men's 100m T35	September 9
Bronze	Hernan Barreto	Athletics	Men's 200m T35	September 12
Bronze		Football 5-a-side	Men	September 17

== Athletics ==
Men's track

Athlete	Event	Heat		Final	
Athlete	Event	Time	Rank	Time	Rank
Mario Tataren	100 m T37	12.30	13	did not advance	
Diego Martin Gonzalez	100 m T35	13.38	6 **Q**	13.45	7
Diego Martin Gonzalez	200 m T35	26.92	3 **Q**	27.21	4
**Hernan Barreto**	100 m T35	13.01	3 **Q**	12.85	3rd place, bronze medalist(s)
**Hernan Barreto**	200 m T35	27.37	4 **Q**	26.50	3rd place, bronze medalist(s)
Nicolas Martin Aravena	100 m T35	13.53	7 **Q**	13.45	6
Nicolas Martin Aravena	200 m T35	28.71	6 **Q**	27.51	6
Mariano Dominguez	400 m T37	57.85	9	did not advance	
Mariano Dominguez	1500 m T37	—N/a		4:46.42	7

Women's track

Athlete	Events	Heats		Final	
Athlete	Events	Time	Rank	Time	Rank
Aldana Isabel Ibanez	100 m T45-47	13.99	11	did not advance	
**Yanina Andrea Martinez**	100 m T36	14.50	1 **Q**	14.46	1st place, gold medalist(s)
**Yanina Andrea Martinez**	200 m T36	30.80	1 **Q**	31.21	4

Men's field

Athlete	Events	Mark	Rank
**Hernan Emanuel Urra**	Shot put F35	14.91	2nd place, silver medalist(s)
Jonathan Andres Avellaneda	High jump T42	1.71	9
Mario Tataren	Long jump T37	5.74	7
Sergio Paz	Discus throw F11	33.99	6

Women's field

Athlete	Events	Mark	Rank
Aldana Isabel Ibanez	Long jump T45-47	4.60	11
Florencia Belen Romero	Discus throw F11	25.29	7
Karina Erika Loyola	Discus throw F40-41	17.18	13
Karina Erika Loyola	Shot put F41	6.17	9

Key

- Note–Ranks given for track events are within the athlete's heat only
- **Q** = Qualified for the next round
- **q** = Qualified for the next round as a fastest loser or, in field events, by position without achieving the qualifying target
- **NR** = National record
- **WB**= World Best
- D/Q = Disqualified
- N/A = Round not applicable for the event
- Bye = Athlete not required to compete in round

== Boccia ==
Argentina qualified for the 2016 Summer Paralympics in this sport at the Montreal hosted 2015 BisFed Americas Pair and Team championship in the Teams BC1/BC2 event. They claimed gold ahead of silver medalist Brazil and bronze medalists Canada.

Individual

Athlete	Event	Pool matches				Quarterfinals	Semifinals	Final / BM	
Athlete	Event	Opposition Score	Opposition Score	Opposition Score	Rank	Opposition Score	Opposition Score	Opposition Score	Rank
Mauricio Ibarbure	Mixed individual BC1	Leung (HKG); **L** 0-4	Soulanis (GRE); **L** 4-6	Prado (ESP); **W** 8-0	3	did not advance			
Sebastian Gonzalez	Mixed individual BC2	Santos (BRA); **L** 2-7	Jeong (KOR); **L** 2-4	—N/a	3	did not advance			

Pairs and teams

Athlete	Event	Pool matches			Quarterfinals	Semifinals	Final / BM	
Athlete	Event	Opposition Score	Opposition Score	Rank	Opposition Score	Opposition Score	Opposition Score	Rank
Mauricio Ibarbure; Luis Cristaldo; Maria Sahonero; Sebastian Gonzalez	Mixed team BC1–2	Slovakia (SVK); **W** 5-4	Portugal (POR); **W** 7-1	1	Hong Kong (HKG); **W** 6-4	Thailand (THA); **L** 1-14	Portugal (POR); **L** 2-6	4

== Cycling ==
With one pathway for qualification being one highest ranked NPCs on the UCI Para-Cycling male and female Nations Ranking Lists on 31 December 2014, Argentina qualified for the 2016 Summer Paralympics in Rio, assuming they continued to meet all other eligibility requirements.

=== Road ===
Athlete	Event	Time	Rank
Raul Villalba; Ezequiel Romero (pilot)	Men's road race B	2:44:55	15
Raul Villalba; Ezequiel Romero (pilot)	Men's time trial B	40:46.89	19
Rodrigo Fernando Lopez	Men's road race C1-3	2:15:19	30
Rodrigo Fernando Lopez	Men's time trial C1	31:43.42	8
Mariela Delgado	Women's road race C4-5	2:21:58	4
Mariela Delgado	Women's time trial C5	29:59.78	6
Cristina Liliana Otero	Women's road race T1-2	1:16:06	7
Cristina Liliana Otero	Women's time trial T1-2	35:20.52	7

=== Track ===
Pursuit

Athlete	Event	Qualification		Final	
Athlete	Event	Time	Rank	Opposition Time	Rank
Raul Villalba; Ezequiel Romero (pilot)	Men's individual pursuit B	4:43.986	12	did not advance	
Rodrigo Fernando Lopez	Men's individual pursuit C1	4:17.966	8	did not advance	
Mariela Delgado	Women's individual pursuit C5	4:00.969	7	did not advance	

Time trial

Athlete	Event	Time	Rank
Raul Villalba; Ezequiel Romero (pilot)	Men's 1 km time trial B	1:06.863	9
Rodrigo Fernando Lopez	Men's 1 km time trial C1–3	1:14.798	16
Mariela Delgado	Women's 500m time trial C4–5	40.222	11

== Equestrian ==
Athlete	Horse	Event	Total	
Athlete	Horse	Event	Score	Rank
Patricio Guglialmelli Lynch	Nirvana Pure Indulgence	Individual championship test grade III	62.512	15

== Football 5-a-side ==
Argentina qualified for the Paralympics by finishing second the 2015 Parapan American Games in Toronto, Canada and the IBSA Blind Football World Championships in Tokyo, Japan. Both finishes were behind host nation, Brazil, who earned an automatic qualifying berth.

The following is the Argentina squad in the football 5-a-side tournament of the 2016 Summer Paralympics.

No.	Pos.	Player	Class	Date of birth (age)
1	GK	Darío Lencina	Sighted	23 August 1980 (aged 36)
2	DF	Ángel Deldo	B1	1 October 1987 (aged 28)
3	DF	Federico Accardi	B1	26 June 1989 (aged 27)
4	DF	Froilán Padilla	B1	22 February 1979 (aged 37)
5	FW	Silvio Velo	B1	29 May 1971 (aged 45)
8	MF	Lucas Rodríguez	B1	20 September 1981 (aged 34)
10	MF	David Peralta	B1	19 August 1981 (aged 35)
11	FW	Nicolás Véliz	B1	14 February 1991 (aged 25)
12	GK	Germán Muleck	Sighted	4 May 1990 (aged 26)
15	FW	Maximiliano Espinillo	B1	16 November 1993 (aged 22)

Group B

Pos	Team	Pld	W	D	L	GF	GA	GD	Pts	Qualification
1	Argentina	3	2	1	0	3	0	+3	**7**	Semi finals
2	China	3	2	1	0	3	0	+3	**7**	Semi finals
3	Spain	3	1	0	2	1	2	−1	**3**	5th–6th place match
4	Mexico	3	0	0	3	0	5	−5	**0**	7th–8th place match

Source: Paralympic.org
9 September 2016
20:00

Argentina	2–0	Mexico
Espinillo 2'; Velo 15'	Report

Olympic Tennis Centre, Rio de Janeiro
Attendance: 3,065
Referee: Germi Guimaraes (Brazil)

11 September 2016
11:00

Argentina	1–0	Spain
Véliz 29'	Report

Olympic Tennis Centre, Rio de Janeiro
Attendance: 2,374
Referee: Lucio Morgado (Brazil)

13 September 2016
11:00

China	0–0	Argentina
	Report

Olympic Tennis Centre, Rio de Janeiro
Attendance: 2,355
Referee: François Carcouët (France)

Semifinal

15 September 2016
20:00

Argentina	0–0	Iran
	Report
Penalties
Espinillo (penalty missed); Velo (penalty scored); Véliz (penalty missed)	1–2	(penalty scored) Rahimighasr; (penalty scored) Shahhosseini

Olympic Tennis Centre, Rio de Janeiro
Attendance: 2,907
Referee: Lucio Morgado (Brazil)

Bronze medal match

17 September 2016
14:00

China	0–0	Argentina
	Report
Penalties
Wei (penalty missed); Liu (penalty missed); Wang Y. (penalty missed)	0–1	(penalty scored) Espinillo; (penalty missed) Velo

Olympic Tennis Centre, Rio de Janeiro
Attendance: 2,900
Referee: Germi Guimaraes (Brazil)

== Football 7-a-side ==
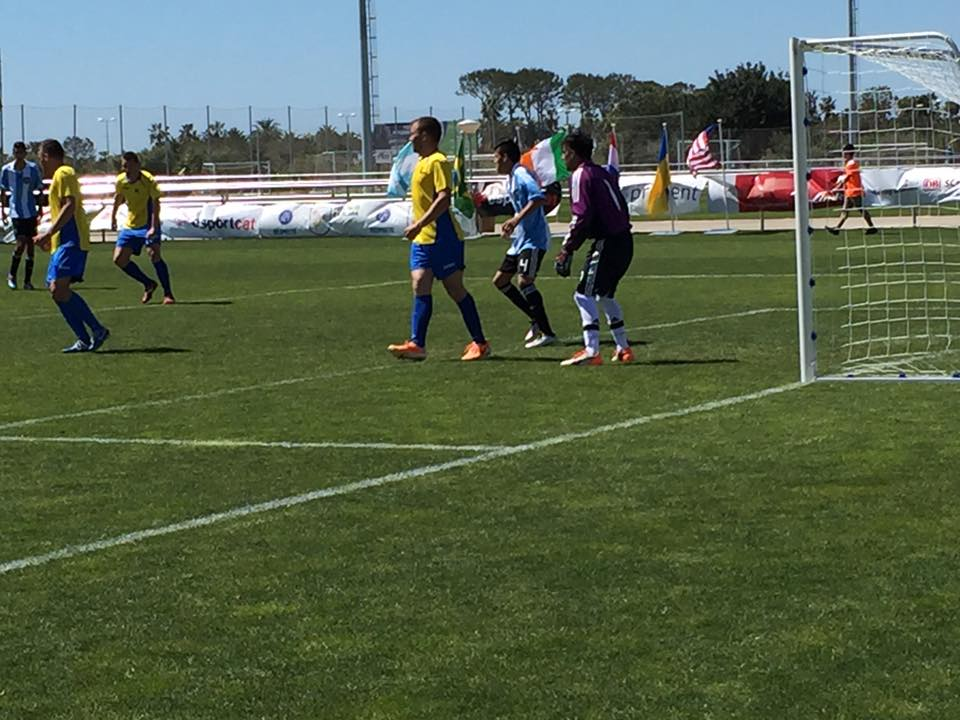
Argentina playing Ukraine at the IFCPF Pre Paralympic Tournament Salou 2016, the last major preparation event ahead of the Rio Games

Argentina qualified for the Paralympics through the 2015 Parapan American Games in Toronto after Iran's qualifying spot was withdrawn because of a lack of competitors in their region.

The draw for the tournament was held on May 6 at the 2016 Pre Paralympic Tournament in Salou, Spain. Argentina was put into Group B with the United States, Netherlands and Russia. Iran qualified for the 2016 Rio Games following the suspension of Russia. The IPC ruled that there could not be a redraw for the groups. This resulted in Iran being put into Group A with the Netherlands, Argentina and the United States.

The tournament where the Paralympic draw took place featured 7 of the 8 teams participating in Rio. It was the last major preparation event ahead of the Rio Games for all teams participating. Argentina finished 7th after losing placement matches to the United States 4 - 3 and Ireland 0 - 3.

Going into the Rio Games, the country was ranked sixth in the world.

Group B

Pos	Team	Pld	W	D	L	GF	GA	GD	Pts	Qualification
1	Iran	3	3	0	0	7	1	+6	**9**	Semi finals
2	Netherlands	3	1	1	1	4	4	0	**4**	Semi finals
3	Argentina	3	1	0	2	4	7	−3	**3**	5th–6th place match
4	United States	3	0	1	2	4	7	−3	**1**	7th–8th place match

Source: Paralympic.org
8 September 2016
16:15

Iran	3–1	Argentina
Kharat 23'; Bakhshi 43'; Hassani Baghi 51'	Report	Morana 59'

Deodoro Stadium, Rio de Janeiro
Attendance: 2,368
Referee: Hector Robas Bondia (Spain)

10 September 2016
14:00

Argentina	0–2	Netherlands
	Report	Kleinlugtebeld 49'; Visker 60+1'

Deodoro Stadium, Rio de Janeiro
Attendance: 10,300
Referee: Raphael Torres (Brazil)

12 September 2016
14:00

Argentina	3–2	United States
Fernández 30'; Lugrin 60+2'; Cortés 60+5'	Report	Hensley 25'; Jahn 53'

Deodoro Stadium, Rio de Janeiro
Attendance: 3,047
Referee: Raphael Torres (Brazil)

Classification 5/6

14 September 2016
16:15

Great Britain	2–0	Argentina
Crossen 20'; Barker 46'	Report

Deodoro Stadium, Rio de Janeiro
Attendance: 3,131
Referee: Skye Arthur-Banning (Canada)

== Judo ==
Five Argentine judoka have qualified to the 2016 Summer Paralympics. The competitions took place at the Carioca Arena 3

Men

Athlete	Event	Round of 16	Quarterfinals	Semifinals	Repechage First round	Repechage Final	Final / BM	
Athlete	Event	Opposition Result	Opposition Result	Opposition Result	Opposition Result	Opposition Result	Opposition Result	Rank
Eduardo Gauto	Men's 60 kg	Ibrahimov (AZE); **L** 000s2-112	did not advance		Sariyevv (KAZ); **L** 000-101	did not advance		
Rodolfo Ramírez	Men's 73 kg	Rodriguez (CUB); **L** 000s1-100s1	did not advance					
Jose Effron	Men's 81 kg	Pereira (BRA); **W** 100s2-000	Avila (MEX); **L** 101s2-000s3	did not advance	—N/a	Safarov (AZE); **L** 000-100	did not advance	
Jorge Lencina	Men's 90 kg	Walby (CAN); **W** 100s1-000	Gogotchuri (GEO); **L** 000s1-100	did not advance	Bye	Boboev (AZE); **L** 000-010s3	did not advance	

Women

Athlete	Event	Quarterfinals	Semifinals	Repechage First round	Repechage Final	Final / BM	
Athlete	Event	Opposition Result	Opposition Result	Opposition Result	Opposition Result	Opposition Result	Rank
Paula Gómez	Women's 48 kg	Lee (TPE); **L** 000-100	did not advance		—N/a	Hangai (JPN); **L** 000s1-000	Did not advance

== Paracanoeing ==
Argentina earned a qualifying spot at the 2016 Summer Paralympics in this sport following their performance at the 2015 ICF Canoe Sprint & Paracanoe World Championships in Milan, Italy where the top six finishers in each Paralympic event earned a qualifying spot for their nation. Lucas Nicolas Diaz earned the spot for Argentina after finishing fourth in the men's KL1 event. The competition took place at Lagoa Stadium.

Athlete	Event	Heats		Semifinals		Final	
Athlete	Event	Time	Rank	Time	Rank	Time	Rank
Lucas Nicolas Diaz	Men's KL1	55.585	7	55.613	3	53.078	6

== Powerlifting ==
Argentina has qualified one athlete to compete at the 2016 Summer Paralympics in Rio de Janeiro. The competition will take place at Riocentro. Jose David Coronel previously competed at the 2012 Summer Paralympic Games in the 75 kg category.

Athlete	Event	Total lifted	Rank
Jose David Coronel	Men's 65 kg	130	9

== Rowing ==
Argentina has qualified one rower to compete at the 2016 Summer Paralympics in Rio de Janeiro. The competition will take place at Rodrigo de Freitas Lagoon.

Athlete	Event	Heats		Repechage		Final	
Athlete	Event	Time	Rank	Time	Rank	Time	Rank
Mariana Gallo	Women's single sculls	7:31.44	6 **R**	7:06.84	5 **FB**	7:13.36	12

Qualification Legend: FA=Final A (medal); FB=Final B (non-medal); R=Repechage

== Sailing ==
One pathway for qualifying for Rio involved having a boat have top seven finish at the 2015 Combined World Championships in a medal event where the country had not already qualified through via the 2014 IFDS Sailing World Championships. Argentina qualified for the 2016 Games under this criterion in the 2.4m event with a sixteenth-place finish overall and the sixth country who had not qualified via the 2014 Championships. The boat was crewed by Tomas Saez Raffaelli. Yet, the boat was crewed at the 2016 Games by Juan Fernández Ocampo, who previously competed at the 2012 Summer Paralympic Games.

Athlete	Event	Race											Net points	Final rank
Athlete	Event	1	2	3	4	5	6	7	8	9	10	11	Net points	Final rank
Juan Fernández Ocampo	2.4 Metre	17	13	17	17	17	16	12	14	11	12	17	146	15

== Swimming ==
Argentina has qualified 11 Paralympic swimmers to the 2016 Summer Paralympic Games, which will compete in various events at the Olympic Aquatics Stadium in Rio de Janeiro.

Men

Athlete	Event	Heat		Final	
Athlete	Event	Time	Rank	Time	Rank
Elian Araya	100m breaststroke SB14	1:10.96	8 **q**	1:11.60	8
Elian Araya	100m backstroke S14	1:10.16	13	did not advance	
Elian Araya	200m individual medley SM14	2:26.97	18	did not advance	
Facundo Jose Arregui	100m freestyle S7	1:11.74	15	did not advance	
Facundo Jose Arregui	400m freestyle S7	4:59.35	5 **q**	4:57.40	5
Guillermo Marro	100m backstroke S7	1:17.78	8 **q**	1:17.62	8
Marco Pulleiro	100m butterfly S9	1:04.25	7 **q**	1:03.75	7
Marco Pulleiro	200m individual medley SM9	2:31.68	13	did not advance	
Matias de Andrade	100m backstroke S7	1:15.44	6 **q**	1:16.43	7
Pipo Carlomagno Jr.	100m breaststroke SB7	1:32.58	9	did not advance	
Pipo Carlomagno Jr.	100m backstroke S8	1:07.70	5 **q**	1:07.33	6
Sergio Zayas	400m freestyle S11	—N/a		5:06.77	7
Sergio Zayas	100m backstroke S11	1:17.75	12	did not advance	

Women

Athlete	Events	Heats		Final	
Athlete	Events	Time	Rank	Time	Rank
Analuz Pellitero	50m freestyle S12	32.23	10	did not advance	
Analuz Pellitero	100m backstroke S12	—N/a		1:21.73	6
Anabel Moro	50m freestyle S12	30.49	6 **q**	30.01	4
Anabel Moro	100m backstroke S12	—N/a		1:22.79	7
Daniela Gimenez	50m freestyle S9	30.24	10	did not advance	
Daniela Gimenez	100m breaststroke SB9	1:20.99	5 **q**	1:20.90	7
Daniela Gimenez	200m individual medley SM9	2:40.30	9	did not advance	
Nadia Baez	50m freestyle S11	36.51	16	did not advance	
Nadia Baez	100m breaststroke S11	—N/a		1:35.51	5

== Table tennis ==
Men

Athlete	Event	Preliminaries			Round of 16	Quarterfinals	Semifinals	Finals
Athlete	Event	Opposition Result	Opposition Result	Rank	Opposition Result	Opposition Result	Opposition Result	Rank
Fernando Eberhardt	Singles class 1	Ducay (FRA); **L** 0-3	Nam (KOR); **L** 0-3	3	—N/a	did not advance		
Gabriel Copola	Singles class 3	Kim (KOR); **W** 3-0	De Freitas (BRA); **W** 3-0	1	Knaf (BRA); **L** 1-3	did not advance		
Mauro Depergola	Singles class 5	Cheng (TPE); **L** 0-3	Palikuca (SRB); **L** 0-3	3	did not advance			
Fernando Eberhardt; Gabriel Copola; Mauro Depergola	Team class 4-5	—N/a			Chinese Taipei (TPE); **L** 0-2	did not advance		

Women

Athlete	Event	Preliminaries				Semifinals	Finals	
Athlete	Event	Opposition Result	Opposition Result	Opposition Result	Rank	Opposition Result	Opposition Result	Rank
Giselle Muñoz	Singles class 7	Van Zon (NED); **L** 1-3	Mahmoud (EGY); **W** 3-0	Korkut (TUR); **L** 0-3	3	did not advance		

== Wheelchair basketball ==
The Argentina women's national wheelchair basketball team has qualified for the 2016 Rio Paralympics. As hosts, Brazil got to choose which group they were put into. They were partnered with Algeria, who would be put in the group they did not choose. Brazil chose Group A, which included Canada, Germany, Great Britain and Argentina. Algeria ended up in Group B with the United States, the Netherlands, France and China.

Group A

Pos	Team	Pld	W	L	PF	PA	PD	Pts	Qualification
1	Germany	4	3	1	248	156	+92	**7 (Note: Head-to-head record: Germany 3 pts, +9 PD; Great Britain 3 pts, −2 PD; Canada 3 pts, −7 PD)**	Quarter-finals
2	Great Britain	4	3	1	228	140	+88	**7**	Quarter-finals
3	Canada	4	3	1	252	181	+71	**7**	Quarter-finals
4	Brazil (H)	4	1	3	196	241	−45	**5**	Quarter-finals
5	Argentina	4	0	4	87	296	−209	**4**	9th/10th place playoff

Source: Paralympic.org
Rules for classification: 1) Points; 2) Head-to-head results; 3) Points difference; 4) Points scored.
(H) Hosts
Notes:

8 September 2016
12:15

Report

Brazil	**85**–19	Argentina
Scoring by quarter: **22**–4, **18**–4, **23**–5, **22**–6
Pts: Almeida 31; Rebs: Almeida 7 Asts: Santana 6		Pts: Pallares 7 Rebs: Pallares 7 Asts: Perez 2

Carioca Arena 1, Rio de Janeiro
Referees: Matt Wells

9 September 2016
10:00

Report

Argentina	20–**79**	Great Britain
Scoring by quarter: 2–**20**, 4–**14**, 3–**21**, 11–**24**
Pts: Pallares 11; Rebs: Pallares 16; Asts: Capdeville 3		Pts: Morrow 16; Rebs: Love 9 Asts: Haizeldon 5

Carioca Arena 1, Rio de Janeiro
Referees: Philip Haines

10 September 2016
9:30

Report

Canada	**73**–28	Argentina
Scoring by quarter: **24**–4, **10**–6, **19**–8, **20**–10
Pts: Young 14; Rebs: Ouellet 6 Asts: Lalonde 6		Pts: Pallares 8 Rebs: Pallares 7 Asts: Olmedo 6

Carioca Arena 1, Rio de Janeiro
Referees: Bill Kuerzi

12 September 2016
9:00

Report

Argentina	20–**59**	Germany
Scoring by quarter: 6–**21**, 2–**11**, 12–**17**, 0–**10**
Pts: Pallares 8 Rebs: Pallares 10; Asts: Pallares 2		Pts: Schunemann 20; Rebs: Schunemann 18; Asts: Schunemann, Gross 5

Carioca Arena 1, Rio de Janeiro
Referees: Celine Villard

== Wheelchair tennis ==
Argentina qualified three competitors in the men's single event, Ezequiel Casco, Gustavo Fernandez and Agustin Ledesma. Fernandez was the Parapan American Games champion.

Athlete	Event	Round of 64	Round of 32	Round of 16	Quarterfinals	Semifinals	Final / BM	
Athlete	Event	Opposition Score	Opposition Score	Opposition Score	Opposition Score	Opposition Score	Opposition Score	Rank
Agustin Ledesma	Men's singles	Kruszelnicki (POL); **L** 2-6, 2-6	did not advance					
Gustavo Fernandez	Men's singles	Bye	De la Puente (ESP); **W** 6-2, 6-4	Kellerman (AUS); **W** 6-1, 6-2	Reid (GBR); **L** 6-2, 6-7, 1-6	did not advance		
Ezequiel Casco	Men's singles	Rydberg (USA); **L** 6-3, 3-6, 6-7	did not advance					
Agustin Ledesma; Gustavo Fernandez	Men's doubles	—N/a	Bye	Els (RSA); Maripa (RSA); **W** 7-5, 6-2	Houdet (FRA); Peifer (FRA); **L** 1-6, 2-6	did not advance		

== See also ==
- Argentina at the Paralympics
- Argentina at the 2016 Summer Olympics
