= Table tennis at the 2020 Summer Paralympics – Men's individual – Class 1 =

Table tennis at the XVI Paralympic Games
- Venue: Tokyo Metropolitan Gymnasium
- Dates: 25–30 August 2021
- Competitors: 21 from 17 nations

Medalists
1st place, gold medalist(s)		Joo Young-dae	South Korea
2nd place, silver medalist(s)		Kim Hyeon-uk	South Korea
3rd place, bronze medalist(s)		Nam Ki-won	South Korea
3rd place, bronze medalist(s)		Thomas Matthews	Great Britain

The Men's individual table tennis – Class 1 tournament at the 2020 Summer Paralympics in Tokyo took place between 25 and 30 August 2021 at Tokyo Metropolitan Gymnasium. Classes 1–5 were for athletes with a physical impairment that affected their legs, and who competed in a sitting position. The lower the number, the greater the impact the impairment aws on an athlete's ability to compete.

In the preliminary stage, athletes competed in four groups of three. Winners and runners-up of each group qualified for the knock-out stage, with the best two group winners receiving a bye to the quarter-finals and the other 12 teams playing from the round of 16. In this edition of the Games, no bronze medal match was held. Losers of each semifinal were automatically awarded a bronze medal.

== Results ==
All times are local time in UTC+9.

=== Preliminary round ===
The first two matches were played on 25 August, and the third on 26 August.

Qualified for the knock-out stage

==== Group A ====
Seed	Athlete	Matches won	Matches lost	Games won	Games lost	Points diff	Rank
1	Joo Young-dae (KOR)	2	0				1
8	Federico Falco (ITA)	1	1				2
9	Fernando Eberhardt (ARG)	0	2				3

Joo Young-dae (KOR)	12	11	11
Federico Falco (ITA)	10	7	4

Federico Falco (ITA)	11	10	12	11	11
Fernando Eberhardt (ARG)	8	12	10	13	6

Joo Young-dae (KOR)	11	12	11
Fernando Eberhardt (ARG)	3	10	6

==== Group B ====
Seed	Athlete	Matches won	Matches lost	Games won	Games lost	Points diff	Rank
7	Thomas Matthews (GBR)	2	0				1
2	Nam Ki-won (KOR)	1	1				2
10	Dmitrii Lavrov (RPC)	0	2				3

Thomas Matthews (GBR)	11	11	10	11
Nam Ki-won (KOR)	6	6	12	9

Nam Ki-won (KOR)	11	11	11
Dmitrii Lavrov (RPC)	9	8	4

Thomas Matthews (GBR)	11	8	11	11
Dmitrii Lavrov (RPC)	3	11	5	6

==== Group C ====
Seed	Athlete	Matches won	Matches lost	Games won	Games lost	Points diff	Rank
3	Endre Major (HUN)	2	0				1
6	Andrea Borgato (ITA)	1	1				2
12	Michael Godfrey (USA)	0	2				3

Endre Major (HUN)	11	11	7	11
Andrea Borgato (ITA)	6	6	11	8

Andrea Borgato (ITA)	11	11	9	11
Michael Godfrey (USA)	4	11	7	7

Endre Major (HUN)	11	11	11
Michael Godfrey (USA)	0	6	7

==== Group D ====
Seed	Athlete	Matches won	Matches lost	Games won	Games lost	Points diff	Rank
4	Kim Hyeon-uk (KOR)	2	0				1
5	Yunier Fernandez Izquierdo (CUB)	1	1				2
11	Silvio Keller (SUI)	0	2				3

Kim Hyeon-uk (KOR)	11	11	11
Yunier Fernandez Izquierdo (CUB)	9	9	9

Yunier Fernandez Izquierdo (CUB)	11	12	11
Silvio Keller (SUI)	9	10	5

Kim Hyeon-uk (KOR)	11	11	11
Silvio Keller (SUI)	3	4	8

=== Final rounds ===
Quarterfinals
A1	Joo Young-dae (KOR)	8	11	11	2	11
B2	Yunier Fernandez Izquierdo (CUB)	11	8	4	11	7
D2	Nam Ki-won (KOR)	11	14	11
C1	Endre Major (HUN)	6	12	3
D1	Kim Hyeon-uk (KOR)	11	11	11
A2	Federico Falco (ITA)	7	6	5
C2	Andrea Borgato (ITA)	9	12	4	12
B1	Thomas Matthews (GBR)	11	10	11	14

Semifinals
A1	Joo Young-dae (KOR)	11	11	11
D2	Nam Ki-won (KOR) (bronze)	6	3	8
D1	Kim Hyeon-uk (KOR)	11	12	11
B1	Thomas Matthews (GBR) (bronze)	7	10	9

Gold medal match
A1	Joo Young-dae (KOR) (gold)	11	13	2	12
D1	Kim Hyeon-uk (KOR) (silver)	8	11	11	10
