= Football 7-a-side at the 2016 Summer Paralympics =

Football 7-a-side at the XV Paralympic Games
- Venue: Deodoro Olympic Park
- Dates: 8–16 September 2016
- Competitors: 112 (8 teams) from 8 nations

Medalists
1st place, gold medalist(s)		Ukraine
2nd place, silver medalist(s)		Iran
3rd place, bronze medalist(s)		Brazil

Football 7-a-side at the 2016 Summer Paralympics was held in Rio de Janeiro at the Deodoro Olympic Park, from 8 September to 16 September. Football 7-a-side is played by athletes with cerebral palsy, a condition characterized by impairment of muscular coordination, stroke, or traumatic brain injury (TBI). 112 footballers are expected to compete for one set of medals.

For these games, the men compete in an 8-team tournament.

== Medalists ==
Event	Gold	Silver	Bronze
Men's team	Ukraine; Kostyantyn Symashko; Vitaliy Trushev; Yevhen Zinoviev; Taras Dutko; Oleh Len; Edhar Kahramanian; Vitalii Romanchuk; Ivan Dotsenko; Dmytro Molodtsov; Stanislav Podolksyi; Volodymyr Antonyuk; Bohdan Kulynych; Artem Krasylnykov; Ivan Shkvarlo	Iran; Moslem Khazaeipirsarabi; Hashem Rastegarimobin; Lotfollah Jangjou; Hassan Safari; Sadegh Hassani Baghi; Farzad Mehri; Behnam Sohrabi; Hossein Tiz Bor; Mehdi Jamali; Jasem Bakhshi; Rasoul Atashafrouz; Mohammad Kharat; Moslem Akbari; Babak Safarikourabbasloo	Brazil; Marcos dos Santos Ferreira; Jônatas Santos Machado; Fernandes Alves Vieira; José Carlos Monteiro Guimarães; Diego Delgado da Silva; Fabrizio Nascimento; Igor Romero; Hudson Hyure; Wesley Martins de Souza; Wanderson Silva de Oliveira; Leandro Gonçalves; Gilvano Diniz; Maycon Ferreira; Felipe Rafael da Silva

== Qualifying ==
Eight teams will contest the competition, which is for male athletes only. An NPC can enter a single squad, consisting of fourteen players, two more per team than in 2012.

Qualification is by a series of tournaments, and was one of the first events for which entries were completed.

Means of qualification	Date	Venue	Berths	Qualified
Host nation	2 October 2009	Copenhagen, Denmark	1	Brazil (BRA)
2014 CPISRA Football 7-a-side European Championships	23 July 2014 – 2 August 2014	Maia, Portugal	1	Ukraine (UKR)
2014 Asian Para Games	19–23 October 2014	Incheon, South Korea	1	Iran (IRI)
Football 7-a-side at the 2015 Parapan American Games	September 2015	Toronto, Canada	1	Argentina (ARG)
2015 CPISRA Football 7-a-side World Championships	16–28 June 2015	(United Kingdom) Burton, Great Britain	4	Great Britain (GBR)
2015 CPISRA Football 7-a-side World Championships	16–28 June 2015	(United Kingdom) Burton, Great Britain	4	Ireland (IRL)
2015 CPISRA Football 7-a-side World Championships	16–28 June 2015	(United Kingdom) Burton, Great Britain	4	United States (USA)
2015 CPISRA Football 7-a-side World Championships	16–28 June 2015	(United Kingdom) Burton, Great Britain	4	Netherlands (NED)
Total			8	

== Tournament ==
=== Group A ===
Pos	Team	Pld	W	D	L	GF	GA	GD	Pts	Qualification
1	Ukraine	3	3	0	0	10	2	+8	9	Semi finals
2	Brazil (H)	3	2	0	1	10	4	+6	6	Semi finals
3	Great Britain	3	1	0	2	7	5	+2	3	5th–6th place match
4	Ireland	3	0	0	3	2	18	−16	0	7th–8th place match

Source: Paralympic.org
(H) Hosts
8 September 2016
10:00

Brazil	2–1	Great Britain
Leandrinho 10'; Maycon 22'	Report	Porcher 33'

Deodoro Stadium, Rio de Janeiro
Attendance: 2,320
Referee: Jorge Barbisan (Argentina)
8 September 2016
14:00

Ukraine	6–0	Ireland
Romanchuk 12'; Antonyuk 16', 17'; Krasylnykov 26', 37'; Molotsov 36'	Report

Deodoro Stadium, Rio de Janeiro
Attendance: 2,368
Referee: Alexandre Santos (Brazil)
10 September 2016
10:00

Great Britain	1–2	Ukraine
Barker 35'	Report	Antonyuk 25'; Krasylnykov 47'

Deodoro Stadium, Rio de Janeiro
Attendance: 8,981
Referee: Paulo Volpato (Brazil)
10 September 2016
19:00

Ireland	1–7	Brazil
Sheridan 50'	Report	Wanderson 5', 49'; Leandrinho 17', 53'; Diego 20'; Fabrizio 34', 41'

Deodoro Stadium, Rio de Janeiro
Attendance: 11,059
Referee: Skye Arthur-Banning (Canada)
12 September 2016
16:15

Ireland	1–5	Great Britain
Tuite 59'	Report	Rutter 1'; Barker 8'; Evans 30+2' (o.g.); Blackwell 30+2'; Highdale 59'

Deodoro Stadium, Rio de Janeiro
Attendance: 3,244
Referee: Hector Robas Bondia (Spain)
12 September 2016
19:00

Ukraine	2–1	Brazil
Krasylnykov 7'; Kahramanian 24'	Report	Wesley 59'

Deodoro Stadium, Rio de Janeiro
Attendance: 7,044
Referee: Ross Haswell (Great Britain)

=== Group B ===
Pos	Team	Pld	W	D	L	GF	GA	GD	Pts	Qualification
1	Iran	3	3	0	0	7	1	+6	9	Semi finals
2	Netherlands	3	1	1	1	4	4	0	4	Semi finals
3	Argentina	3	1	0	2	4	7	−3	3	5th–6th place match
4	United States	3	0	1	2	4	7	−3	1	7th–8th place match

Source: Paralympic.org
8 September 2016
16:15

Iran	3–1	Argentina
Kharat 23'; Bakhshi 43'; Hassani Baghi 51'	Report	Morana 59'

Deodoro Stadium, Rio de Janeiro
Attendance: 2,368
Referee: Hector Robas Bondia (Spain)
8 September 2016
19:00

Netherlands	2–2	United States
Saedt 44'; Kleinlugtebeld 57'	Report	Ballou 3', 60'

Deodoro Stadium, Rio de Janeiro
Attendance: 2,223
Referee: Ross Haswell (Great Britain)
10 September 2016
14:00

Argentina	0–2	Netherlands
	Report	Kleinlugtebeld 49'; Visker 60+1'

Deodoro Stadium, Rio de Janeiro
Attendance: 10,300
Referee: Raphael Torres (Brazil)
10 September 2016
16:15

United States	0–2	Iran
	Report	Bakhshi 4'; Tiz Bor 60+2'

Deodoro Stadium, Rio de Janeiro
Attendance: 11,326
Referee: Jorge Barbisan (Argentina)
12 September 2016
10:00

Iran	2–0	Netherlands
Rastegarimobin 9'; Mehri 18'	Report

Deodoro Stadium, Rio de Janeiro
Attendance: 2,222
Referee: Skye Arthur-Banning (Canada)
12 September 2016
14:00

Argentina	3–2	United States
Fernández 30'; Lugrin 60+2'; Cortés 60+5'	Report	Hensley 25'; Jahn 53'

Deodoro Stadium, Rio de Janeiro
Attendance: 3,047
Referee: Raphael Torres (Brazil)

== Knockout stage ==
=== Classification round ===
==== 7th–8th place match ====
14 September 2016
14:00

Ireland	1–2	United States
Sheridan 31'	Report	Jahn 13'; Bremer 56'

Deodoro Stadium, Rio de Janeiro
Attendance: 2,800
Referee: Jorge Barbisan (Argentina)

==== 5th–6th place match ====
14 September 2016
16:15

Great Britain	2–0	Argentina
Crossen 20'; Barker 46'	Report

Deodoro Stadium, Rio de Janeiro
Attendance: 3,131
Referee: Skye Arthur-Banning (Canada)

=== Medal round ===
Semifinals
14 September 10:00
Netherlands	0
Ukraine	4
14 September 19:00
Iran	5
Brazil	0

Gold-medal match
16 September 17:00
Ukraine	2
Iran	1
Bronze medal
16 September 14:00
Netherlands	1
Brazil	3

==== Semi finals ====
14 September 2016
10:00

Ukraine	4–0	Netherlands
Antonyuk 9', 44', 60+2'; Len 30+1'	Report

Deodoro Stadium, Rio de Janeiro
Attendance: 2,010
Referee: Hector Robas Bondia (Spain)
14 September 2016
19:00

Iran	5–0	Brazil
Atashafrouz 14'; Jamali 30', 37', 53'; Tiz Bor 48'	Report

Deodoro Stadium, Rio de Janeiro
Attendance: 3,965
Referee: Ross Haswell (Great Britain)

==== Bronze-medal match ====
16 September 2016
14:00

Netherlands	1–3	Brazil
Schuitert 54'	Report	Leandrinho 1', 49', 56'

Deodoro Stadium, Rio de Janeiro
Attendance: 6,737
Referee: Jorge Barbisan (Argentina)

==== Gold-medal match ====
16 September 2016
17:00

Ukraine	2–1	Iran
Antonyuk 26'; Krasylnykov 65'	Report	Jamali 50'

Deodoro Stadium, Rio de Janeiro
Attendance: 9,305
Referee: Ross Haswell (Great Britain)

== Final rankings ==
Rank	Team
Gold medal	Ukraine
Silver medal	Iran
Bronze medal	Brazil
4.	Netherlands
5.	Great Britain
6.	Argentina
7.	United States
8.	Ireland

Source: Paralympic.org

== See also ==
- Football 5-a-side at the 2016 Summer Paralympics
- Football at the 2016 Summer Olympics
