= Kevin Hensley =

Kevin Hensley may refer to:

- Kevin Hensley (swimmer), swimmer from the United States Virgin Islands
- Kevin Hensley (politician), member of the Delaware House of Representatives
- Kevin Hensley (soccer) (born 1992), American Paralympic soccer player
