= Football 7-a-side at the 2015 Parapan American Games =

- Venue: Pan Am / Parapan Am Fields
- Dates: 8 – 15 August 2015
- Competitors: 70 quota limit from 5 nations
- Teams: 5

Medalists
1st place, gold medalist(s)		Brazil
2nd place, silver medalist(s)		Argentina
3rd place, bronze medalist(s)		Venezuela

Football 7-a-side competitions at the 2015 Parapan American Games in Toronto were held from 8 to 15 August at the Pan Am / Parapan Am Fields, which are located on the back campus of the University of Toronto. Football 7-a-side make its return to the program, after last being staged in 2007. The winner of the tournament qualified for the 2016 Summer Paralympics in Rio de Janeiro, Brazil. As Brazil won the competition the second place Argentina qualified for the Paralympics.

== Participating teams and officials ==
=== Qualifying ===
A total of five teams competed in the football seven a side competition. The host nation (Canada) automatically qualified a team. A team may consist of a maximum of 14 athletes.

Means of qualification	Date	Venue	Berths	Qualified
Host nation			1	Canada
2014 CPISRA Football 7-a-side American Cup	19 – 26 September 2014	Toronto, Canada	4	Brazil; Argentina; United States; Venezuela
Total			5	

=== Squads ===
The individual teams contact following football gamblers on to:

Argentina	Brazil	Canada
Claudio Figuera; Rodrigo Luquez; Mariano Cortes; Ezequiel Jaime; Matias Bassi; Maximiliano Fernandez; Pablo Molina Lopez; Mariano Morana; Duncan Coronel; Rodrigo Lugrin; Matias Fernandez Romano; Gustavo Nahuelquin; Lautaro Marzolini; Alberto Albarce	Marcos dos Santos Ferreira; Jonatas Santos Machado; Fernandes Alves Vieira; Jose Monteiro Guimaraes; Marcos Cabral da Costa; Ubirajara da Silva Magalhaes; Ronaldo de Souza Almeida; Evandro de Oliveira Gomes; Maycon Ferreira de Almeida; Wanderson Silva de Oliveira; Jan Brito da Costa; Gilvano Diniz da Silva; Gabriell D'Anglo Santos; Wesley Martins de Souza	Damien Wojtiw; Liam Stanley; Matt Gilbert; John Phillips; Sam Charron; Lucas Bruno; Dustin Hodgson; Vito Proietti; Trevor Stiles; Kyle Payne; Matt Brown; Nick Heffernan; Cory Johnson; Joseph Resendes

United States	Venezuela
Keith Johnson; Gavin Sibayan; Bryce Boarman; Tyler Bennett; Jordan Weise; Adam Ballou; Seth Jahn; Kevin Hensley; Mason Abbiate; Daniel Hoffman; David Garza; Michael Moore; Jackson McCabe; Marthell Vazquez	Marlon Bello; Gabriel Medina Diaz; Peter Alvarado Gonzalez; Marcos Cardenas Nieto; Daniel Sanchez; Richard Mogollon Melendez; Pedro Suarez Rico; Asdrubal Olivero Mora; Angel Molina Camacho; Jessy Yari Villegas; Saul Torres Villegas; Carlos Carasquel Torres; Jose Quintana; Frank Pineda Teran

== Venues ==
The venues to be used for the World Championships were located in Toronto.

Toronto	Football 7-a-side at the 2015 Parapan American Games is located in Canada
Stadium: Parapan-Am field	Football 7-a-side at the 2015 Parapan American Games is located in Canada
Capacity: 2,000	Football 7-a-side at the 2015 Parapan American Games is located in Canada

== Format ==
The first round, or group stage, was a competition between the 5 teams in one group, where engaged in a round-robin tournament within itself. The best two teams play for gold in the finals, the third and fourth place for the third place in the tournament, the fifth in the table is the fifth of the tournament.

Tie-breaking criteria for group play
The ranking of teams in each group was based on the following criteria:
1. Number of points
2. Goal difference
3. Number of goals scored
4. Number of points obtained in matches between tied teams
5. Goal difference in matches between tied teams
6. Number of goals scored in matches between tied teams
7. Drawing of lots

Classification
Athletes with a physical disability competed. The athlete's disability was caused by a non-progressive brain damage that affects motor control, such as cerebral palsy, traumatic brain injury or stroke. Athletes must be ambulant.

Players were classified by level of disability.

- C5: Athletes with difficulties when walking and running, but not in standing or when kicking the ball.
- C6: Athletes with control and co-ordination problems of their upper limbs, especially when running.
- C7: Athletes with hemiplegia.
- C8: Athletes with minimal disability; must meet eligibility criteria and have an impairment that has impact on the sport of football.

Teams must field at least one class C5 or C6 player at all times. No more than two players of class C8 are permitted to play at the same time.

== Group stage ==
In the first group stage have seen the teams in a one group of five teams.

Pos	Team	Pld	W	D	L	GF	GA	GD	Pts	Qualified for
1	Brazil	4	4	0	0	0	0	0	12	Team play for position 1
2	Argentina	4	3	0	1	0	0	0	9	Team play for position 1
3	Canada	4	1	1	2	0	0	0	4	Team play for the position 3
4	Venezuela	4	0	2	2	0	0	0	2	Team play for the position 3
5	United States	4	0	1	3	0	0	0	1	Team play for the position 5

Source: The results of the table were determined from the results
Rules for classification: Tie-breaking criteria
8 August 2015
9:00

Brazil	7–0	Venezuela
Martins de Souza 11' 33'; Santos Machado 14' 46'; D'Angelo Santos 31'; Da Silva Magalhaes 44'; Brito da Costa 53'	Report

Parapan-Am field
Referee: Yusri Rudolf
8 August 2015
11:00

Argentina	3–1	Canada
Cortes 4'; Lungrin 30'+1; Fernandez Romano 54'	Report	Charron 42'

Parapan-Am field
Referee: Skye Arthur-Banning
9 August 2015
9:00

Venezuela	0–4	Argentina
	Report	Morana 10' (pen.) 22'; Cortes 41'; Coronel 58'

Parapan-Am field
Referee: Alexis Vaughan
9 August 2015
11:00

Canada	2–1	United States
Stiles 15'; Charron 54'	Report	Jahn 11'

Parapan-Am field
Referee: Ross Haswell
10 August 2015
9:00

Brazil	7–0	Argentina
Monteiro Guimaraes 6' 12'; De Oliveira Gomes 15'; Ferreira de Almeida 21' 30'; Silva de Oliveira 37'; Martins de Souza 42'	Report

Parapan-Am field
Referee: Ross Haswell
10 August 2015
11:00

United States	1–1	Venezuela
Garza 60'+1	Report	Olivares Mora 40' (pen.)

Parapan-Am field
Referee: Yusri Rudolf
12 August 2015
9:00

Argentina	1–0	United States
Lugrin 30'	Report

Parapan-Am field
Referee: Yusri Rudolf
12 August 2015
11:00

Canada	0–8	Brazil
	Report	De Oliveira Gomes 7'; Brito da Costa 14' 24'; Silva de Oliveira 21'; Monteiro Guimares 26'; Alves Vieira 35'; Ferreira de Almeida 54'; Martins de Souza 59'

Parapan-Am field
Referee: Skye Artur-Banning
13 August 2015
9:00

Brazil	6–0	United States
D'Angelo Santos 3'; Silva de Oliveira 22' 32'; Ferreira de Almeida 24' 60'+1; Santos Machado 60'+4	Report

Parapan-Am field
Referee: Alexis Vaughan
13 August 2015
11:00

Venezuela	1–1	Canada
Olivares Mora 47'	Report	Charron 31'

Parapan-Am field
Referee: Ross Haswell

== Finals ==
Position 3-4

15 August 2015
9:00

Canada	1–2	Venezuela
Charron 60'+5	Report	Quintana 17'; Yari Villegas 43'

Parapan-Am field
Referee: Skye Arthur-Banning

Final

15 August 2015
11:00

Brazil	3–1	Argentina
De Oliveira Gomes 11'; Monteiro Guimaraes 44'; Ferreira de Almeida 54'	Report	Bassi 15' (pen.)

Parapan-Am field
Referee: Ross Haswell

== Statistics ==
=== Ranking ===
Rank	Team
Gold medal	Brazil
Silver medal	Argentina
Bronze medal	Venezuela
4.	Canada
5.	United States

== See also ==
- Football 7-a-side at the 2016 Summer Paralympics
