= Pablo Ramirez =

Pablo Ramirez may refer to:

- Pablo Ramírez Barrientos, Cuban paralympic powerlifter
- Pablo Ramírez Rodríguez (1885–1949), Chilean politician
- Pablo Ramirez (skateboarder) (1993–2019)
- Pablo Ramírez, Mexican Spanish-language sportscaster
