= Paul Davies (table tennis) =

British table tennis player

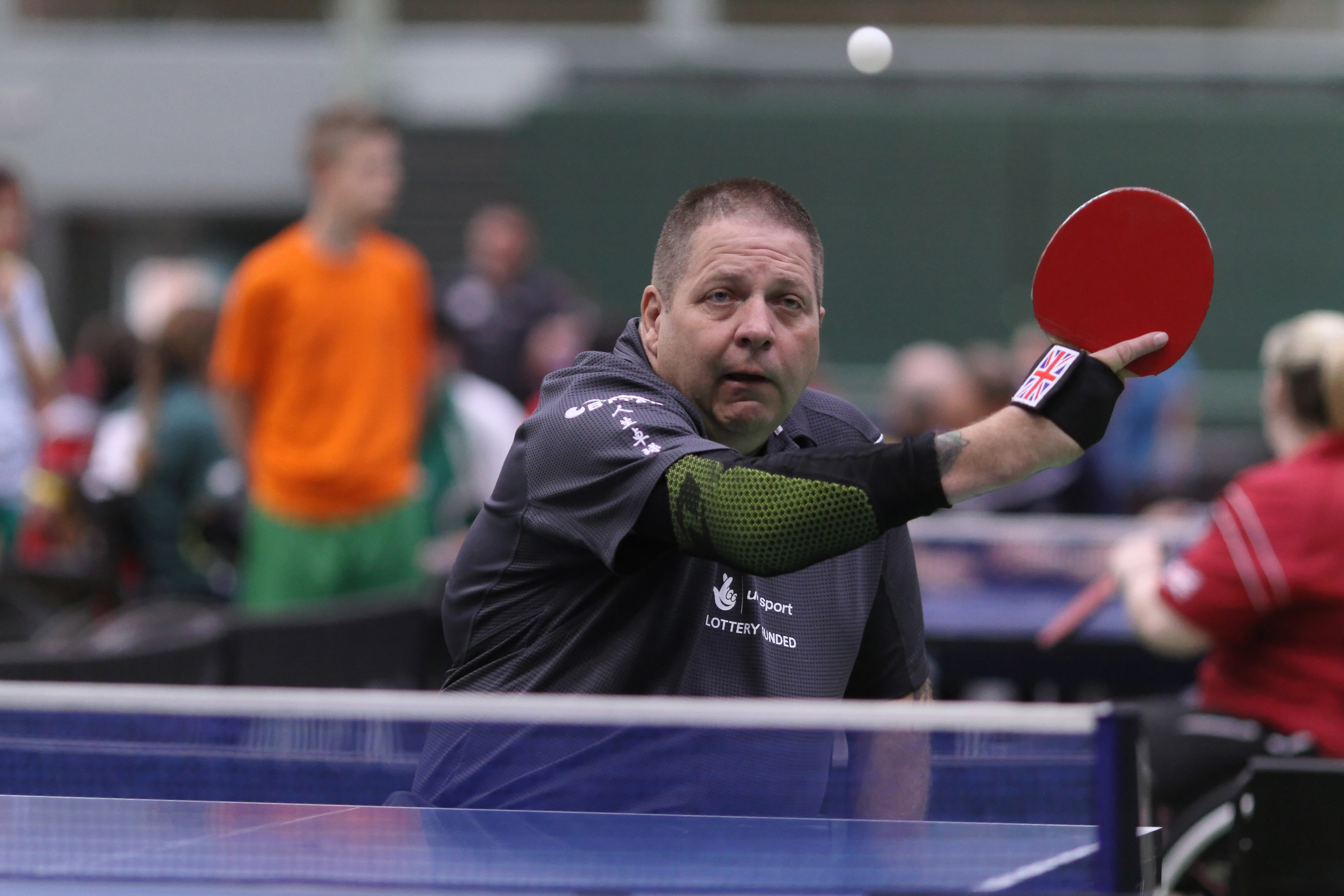

Personal information
- Full name: Paul Davies
- Nationality: British
- Born: 12 October 1966 (age 59) Cardiff, Wales

Sport
- Country: Great Britain
- Sport: Table tennis
- Event: Class 1 singles

Achievements and titles
- Paralympic finals: 2012
Medal record
Table tennis
Representing Great Britain
Paralympic Games
Bronze medal – third place	2012 London	Individual – Class 1

Paul Davies (born 12 October 1966) is a Welsh Paralympic table tennis player. Davies, who has played table tennis competitively since 1991, was selected for the 2012 Paralympic Games, and took the bronze medal in the men's individual class 1 event.

== Career history ==
Davies was born in 1966 and grew up in Cardiff, Wales, before moving to Cornelly in Bridgend. In 1986 he was involved in a motorbike accident which left him paralyzed.

Davies played table tennis in his free time, but in 1991 he became far more involved in the sport. A veteran of the sport for twenty years, Davies came to prominence in the build-up to the 2012 Summer Paralympics. In the 2011 European Championships in Split, Croatia, he and fellow British player Rob Davies took the silver medal in the class 1 men's team competition.

In 2012, Davies and Rob Davies entered the Slovakian Open in Bratislava, taking the gold medal in the men's team, while Paul Davies won silver in the men's singles. That year both he and his team mate Davies qualified for the Great Britain team at the 2012 Summer Paralympics in the men's single class 1 event. At the London Paralympics, Davies was placed in group C, along with Andrea Borgato of Italy and Andreas Vevera of Austria. He beat Borgato in straight sets, but Vevera was a harder prospect, Davies coming from 2–1 down to win by three sets to two. This allowed Davies to progress to the semi-finals where he met eventual gold medalist Holger Nikelis of Germany. Nikelis was too strong an opponent on the day, beating Davies in straight sets. Although out of the top medal positions, Davies was placed into bronze medal contention, facing the other semi-final loser, Lee Chang Ho of South Korea. The match went the full five rounds, with Davies the eventual winner, earning him the bronze medal.
