= Table tennis at the 2016 Summer Paralympics – Men's team – Class 1–2 =

Table tennis at the XV Paralympic Games
- Venue: Riocentro Pavilion 3
- Dates: 14–17 September 2016
- Competitors: 6 teams from 6 nations

Medalists
1st place, gold medalist(s)		Fabien Lamirault; Stephane Molliens; Jean-François Ducay	France
2nd place, silver medalist(s)		Joo Young Dae; Kim Kyung Mook; Cha Soo Yong	South Korea
3rd place, bronze medalist(s)		Iranildo Conceição Espíndola; Guilherme Marcião da Costa; Aloisio Lima	Brazil

The Men's team table tennis – 1–2 tournament at the 2016 Summer Paralympics in Rio de Janeiro took place during 14–17 September 2016 at Riocentro Pavilion 3. Classes 1-5 were for athletes with a physical impairment that affected their legs, and who competed in a sitting position. The lower the number, the greater the impact the impairment was on an athlete’s ability to compete.

== Results ==
All times are local time in UTC-3.

=== Competition bracket ===
Quarterfinals
5	Great Britain (GBR)	0	1
4	Brazil (BRA)	3	3
3	South Korea (KOR)	3	3
6	Italy (ITA)	0	0

Semifinals
1	France (FRA)	3	3
4	Brazil (BRA)	0	0
3	South Korea (KOR)	3	2	3
2	Slovakia (SVK)	1	3	2

Finals
1	France (FRA)	3	2	3
3	South Korea (KOR)	0	3	1
Bronze medal match
4	Brazil (BRA)	3	1	3
2	Slovakia (SVK)	2	3	2
