= Rob Davies (table tennis) =

British Paralympic table tennis player

Rob Davies MBE
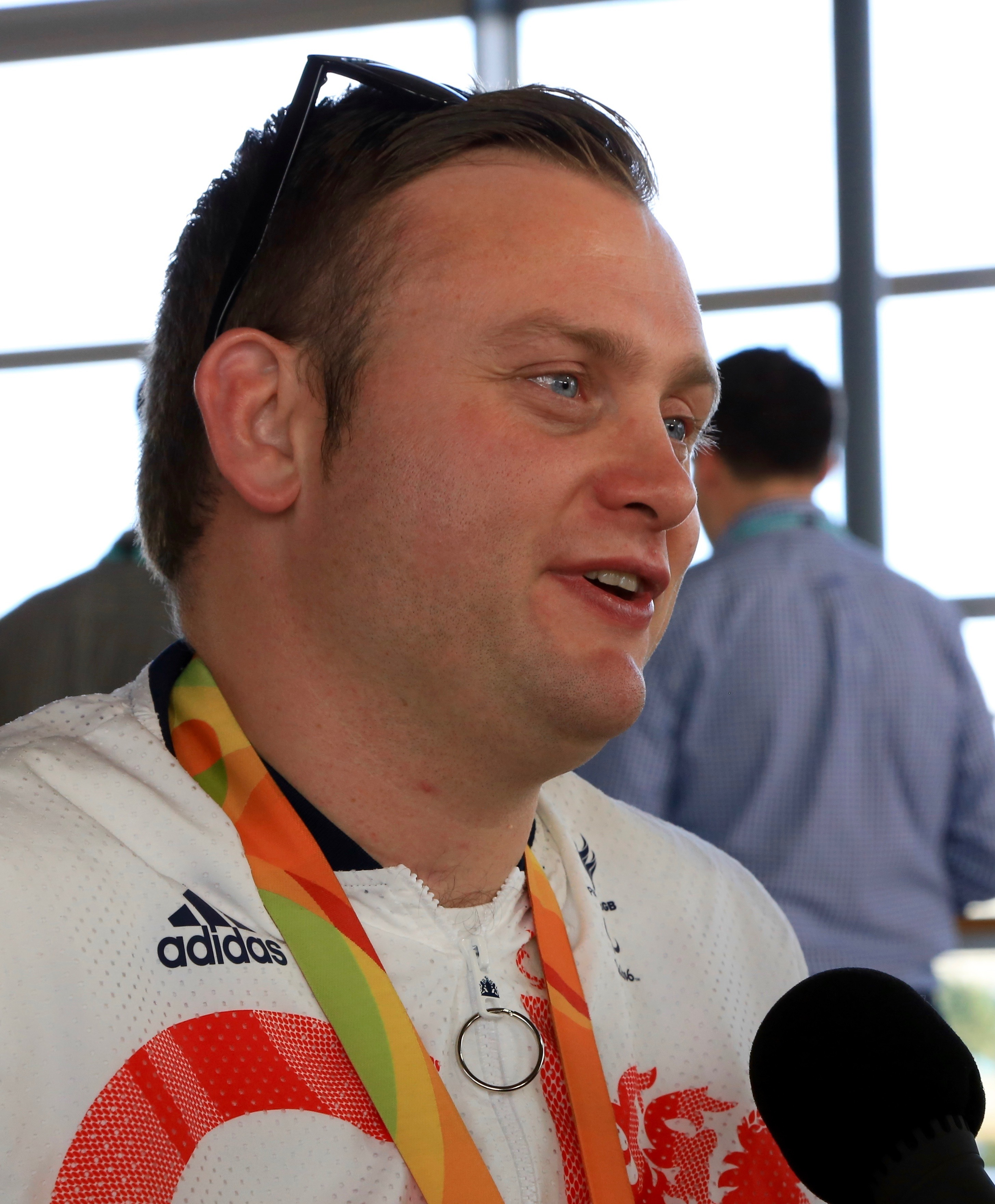

Personal information
- Nationality: British
- Born: Robert Rhys Davies; 14 August 1984 (age 41) Abergavenny, Wales

Sport
- Country: Great Britain
- Sport: Table tennis
- Event: Class 1 singles

Achievements and titles
- Paralympic finals: 2012 2016
- Highest world ranking: 1st
Medal record
Representing Great Britain
table tennis
Summer Paralympics
Gold medal – first place	2016 Rio de Janeiro	Men's Singles – Class 1
Silver medal – second place	2024 Paris	Men's Singles – Class 1
European Championships
Silver medal – second place	2011 Split	Men's team – Class 1–2
Gold medal – first place	2013 Italy	Men's team – Class 1–2
Gold medal – first place	2013 Italy	Men's Singles – Class 1
Gold medal – first place	2015 Vejle	Men's Singles – Class 1
Gold medal – first place	2015 Vejle	Men's team – Class 1–2
Gold medal – first place	2017 Lasko	Men's Singles – Class 1
Gold medal – first place	2019 Helsinborg	Men's Singles – Class 1
Silver medal – second place	2023 Sheffield	Men's Singles – Class 1
Gold medal – first place	2025 Helsinborg	Men's Singles – Class 1

Robert Rhys Davies (born 14 August 1984) is a British Paralympic table tennis player. Davies, who has played table tennis competitively since 2007, was selected for the 2012 Paralympic Games. After winning the 2013 European Championship title in both singles and team events, he was named world number 1 in the class-1 category.

== Personal history ==
Davies was born in Abergavenny in 1984. He has a twin brother, Richard. A semi-professional rugby player, Davies played at hooker for Brecon RFC. In September 2005, while playing in a home game against Ynysybwl RFC, a collapsed scrum left him with a broken neck. He was air-lifted to hospital by a helicopter, which half an hour earlier had rescued his twin brother from a road accident. Davies was treated at the University Hospital of Wales where he was initially informed that he would not recover movement in his legs and arms. After moving to Rookwood Hospital specialist spinal unit in Llandaff, he regained some use in his arms and hands. During his rehabilitation he met Welsh table tennis player Sara Head who introduced him to the sport.

== Table tennis career ==
Davies, who plays with the paddle strapped to his hand, joined the Great Britain team in 2007, competing in class 1 single events, and class 1–2 team events. In 2011 he competed in the British table tennis open and took the gold in the Men's Single class 1 category. That same year he entered the European Championships in Split, Croatia. He and fellow British player Paul Davies took the silver medal in the class 1 Men's Team competition. In 2012 he represented Great Britain at the 2012 Summer Paralympics in London, where in the preliminaries he beat Philip Quinlan of Ireland, but a loss to Jean-Francois Ducay of France saw him come second in his league and he failed to advance to the knockout stages.

In 2012 Davies travelled to Italy to compete in the 2012 European Championships. There he picked up two gold medals, in the men's singles and, again with Paul Davies, the Men's team 1–2 class. Following his European success, in October 2013, Davies was confirmed as the world number one in the class-1 category, having beaten the previous holder, Holger Nikelis of Germany, in the semi-finals in Italy. Two years later Davies defended his European title beating France's Jean-Francois Ducay 3–2 in the Class 1 final in Vejle, Denmark. He followed this by retaining his team gold, this time alongside fellow Welshman Tom Matthews.
At the Rio de Janeiro paralympics in 2016, Davies won Gold by beating Korean Young Dae Joo in the final.

Davis was appointed Member of the Order of the British Empire (MBE) in the 2017 New Year Honours for services to table tennis.
