= Kim Hyeon-uk (table tennis) =

South Korean para table tennis player

Personal information
- Born: 25 December 1995 (age 30) Seoul, South Korea

Sport
- Sport: Table tennis
Medal record
Men's para table tennis
Representing South Korea
Paralympic Games
Silver medal – second place	2020 Tokyo	Singles C1
Silver medal – second place	2020 Tokyo	Team C1–2

Kim Hyeon-uk (born 25 December 1995) is a South Korean para table tennis player. He won the silver medal in the men's individual C1 event at the 2020 Summer Paralympics held in Tokyo, Japan. He also won the silver medal in the men's team C1–2 event.
