= Endre Major =

Hungarian para table tennis player

Personal information
- Born: 12 April 1969 (age 57) Szeged, Hungary

Sport
- Sport: Para table tennis
- Disability class: C1
Medal record
Para table tennis
Representing Hungary
Paralympic Games
Bronze medal – third place	2024 Paris	Singles C1

Endre Major (born 12 April 1969) is a Hungarian para table tennis player.

== Career ==
Major represented Hungary at the Summer Paralympic Games and finished in fourth place in 2016 and fifth place in 2020. He again represented Hungary at the 2024 Summer Paralympics and won a bronze medal in the singles C1 event.
