= Jérôme Guézénec =

French para table tennis player

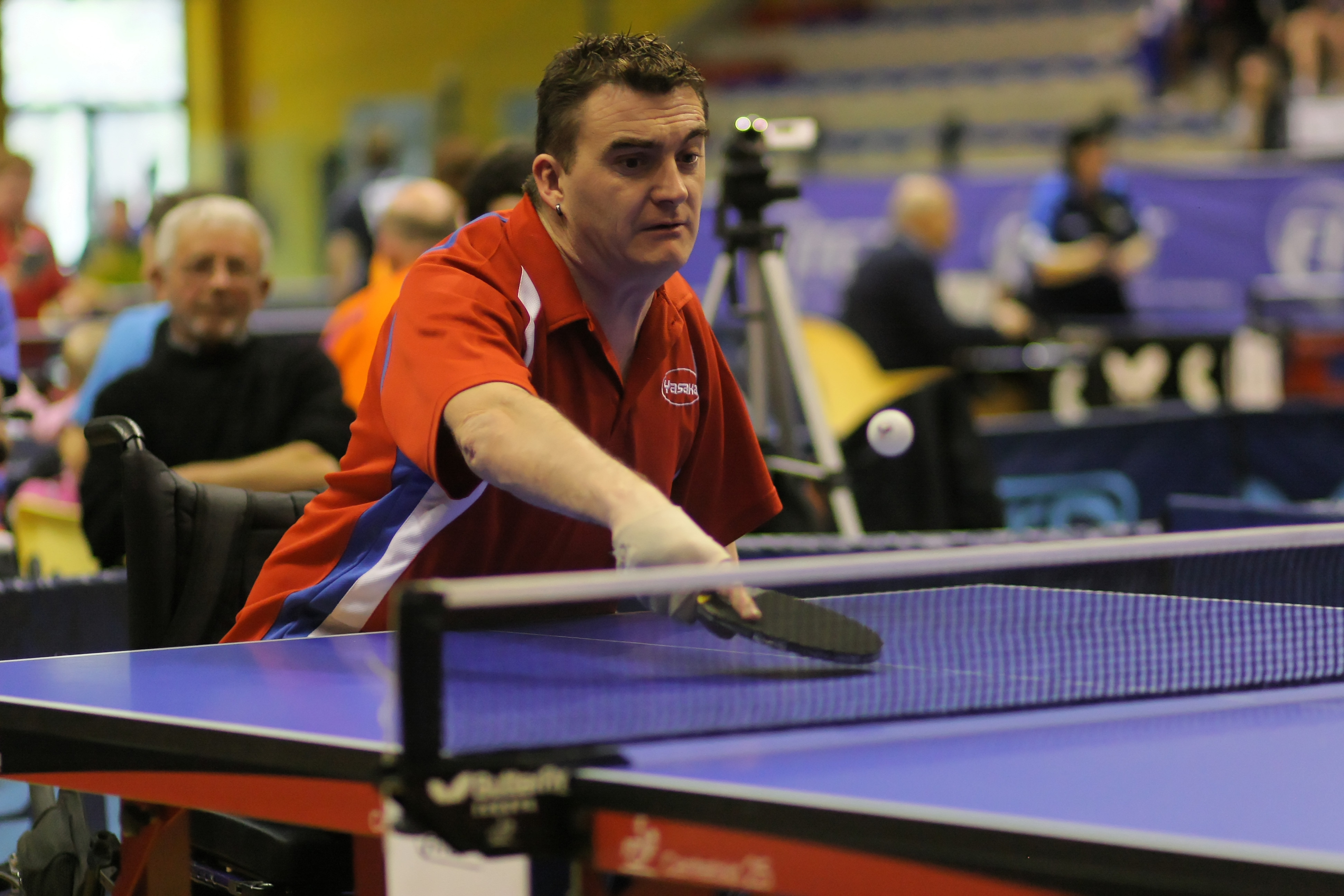
- Guézénec in 2010

Personal information
- Born: 23 December 1973 (age 52) Treguier, France

Sport
- Country: France
- Sport: Para table tennis
- Disability class: C1
Medal record
Para table tennis
Representing France
World Championships
Silver medal – second place	2010 Gwangju	Teams C1-2
European Championships
Gold medal – first place	2011 Split	Teams C1
Silver medal – second place	2007 Kranjska Gora	Teams C1
Silver medal – second place	2009 Genoa	Teams C1

Jérôme Guézénec (born 23 December 1973) is a French retired para table tennis player who competed at international table tennis competitions. He is a World champion and a two-time European silver medalist.
