= Yunier Fernández =

Cuban para table tennis player

Personal information
- Born: 1 October 1982 (age 43)

Sport
- Sport: Table tennis
- Disability class: 1
Medal record
Men's para table tennis
Representing Cuba
Paralympic Games
Gold medal – first place	2024 Paris	Singles C1
Parapan American Games
Gold medal – first place	2019 Lima	Singles C1
Gold medal – first place	2023 Santiago	Singles C1
Silver medal – second place	2007 Rio de Janeiro	Singles C1
Silver medal – second place	2007 Rio de Janeiro	Teams C1-2
Silver medal – second place	2015 Toronto	Singles C1
Bronze medal – third place	2011 Guadalajara	Singles C1-2

Yunier Fernández (born 1 October 1982) is a Cuban para table tennis player. He competed at the 2008 Summer Paralympics, 2020 Summer Paralympics and 2024 Summer Paralympics; in 2024, he reached the finals of the men's individual class 1 event.
