= Seth Jahn =

Personal information
- Nationality: United States
- Born: December 25, 1982 (age 43) Bradenton, Florida, U.S.
- Height: 1.905 m (6 ft 3 in)
- Weight: 211 lb (96 kg)

Sport
- Sport: Soccer / 7-a-side football
- College team: St. Andrews University (NC)
Medal record
7-a-side football
America's Cup
Bronze medal – third place	2014	Men's
- Updated on 18 June 2016

Seth Jahn
- Military career
- Branch: U.S. Army / United States Special Operations
- Service years: 2003—2014

Seth Jahn (born December 25, 1982) is an American retired 7-a-side soccer player and former member of the athlete's council for the United States Soccer Federation.

== Personal ==
Jahn was born on December 25, 1982. He is from Lakeland, Florida, and currently lives in Tampa, Florida. He graduated from George Jenkins High School in Lakeland, Florida. While in his 20s, he worked for the Lake Wales Police Department. He enlisted in the US Army on September 11, 2003, initially serving in the field artillery corps before joining the Special Operations community.

A US Army veteran, Jahn did three tours of Afghanistan as a member of the U.S. Army's Special Operations. He also served in Iraq. In 2010 while serving in Afghanistan, he was severely injured in combat after his all-terrain vehicle rolled down an embankment. In 2014, as a government security contractor, he was injured again after being hit by rocket shrapnel.

Since acquiring his disability, Jahn has climbed two of the world's tallest mountains. He has also fought professionally in a Muay Thai bout in Thailand, MMA in Europe, and has also driven a Formula One car in European circuits.

== 7-a-side Football ==
Jahn is a CP6 classified player and played center forward for the USPNT.

Jahn got involved with 7-a-side football through a military rehabilitation program. He earned his first call up to the national team squad in 2014. He represented the US at the 2014 Americas Cup where the United States finished third. Jahn's first US National career goal would come in the 11th minute against Mexico of the tournament en route to their bronze medal finish.

In March 2015, Jahn was part of the 14 man roster that participated in the Povoa 2015 tournament. Jahn was pivotal in the Americans securing a third-place finish when he scored a hat trick including the game winner in the final game against Portugal. In June 2015, he represented the United States at the World Championships in England. In the lead up to the 2016 Summer Paralympics in Rio de Janeiro, Jahn was selected to the team's full-time residency program, training in Atlanta, Georgia Jahn was part of the 14 man squad that represented the United States at the 2015 Parapan American Games in Toronto. He played in the team's game against Canada.

== US Soccer Council ==
Jahn's speech at the US Soccer National Council's 2021 annual general meeting on February 27, 2021, was condemned by the United States Soccer Federation for downplaying the effects of police brutality and chattel slavery. The next day, it was announced he had been removed from the Athlete's Council.
