= Joo Young-dae =

South Korean para table tennis player

Personal information
- Born: 15 January 1973 (age 53) Sacheon, South Gyeongsang, South Korea
- Height: 174 cm (5 ft 9 in)
- Weight: 66 kg (146 lb)

Sport
- Sport: Table tennis
- Playing style: Right-handed shakehand grip
- Disability class: 1
- Highest ranking: 1 (July 2017)
- Current ranking: 1
Medal record
Men's para table tennis
Representing South Korea
Paralympic Games
Gold medal – first place	2020 Tokyo	Singles C1
Silver medal – second place	2016 Rio de Janeiro	Singles C1
Silver medal – second place	2016 Rio de Janeiro	Teams C1–2
World Championships
Silver medal – second place	2018 Lasko	Singles C1
Asian Para Games
Gold medal – first place	2022 Hangzhou	Singles C1
Gold medal – first place	2022 Hangzhou	Doubles MD4
Asian Championships
Gold medal – first place	2017 Beijing	Singles C1
Gold medal – first place	2017 Beijing	Teams C1–2
Gold medal – first place	2019 Taichung	Singles C1
Gold medal – first place	2019 Taichung	Teams C1–2

Joo Young-dae (Korean: 주영대; RR: Ju Yeongdae, born 15 January 1973) is a South Korean para table tennis player. He won two silver medals at the 2016 Summer Paralympics. He is being coached by Choi Kyoung-sik.

== Personal life ==
He became disabled following a traffic accident in 1993, when he was a sophomore at Gyeongsang National University.
