= Nam Ki-won =

South Korean para table tennis player

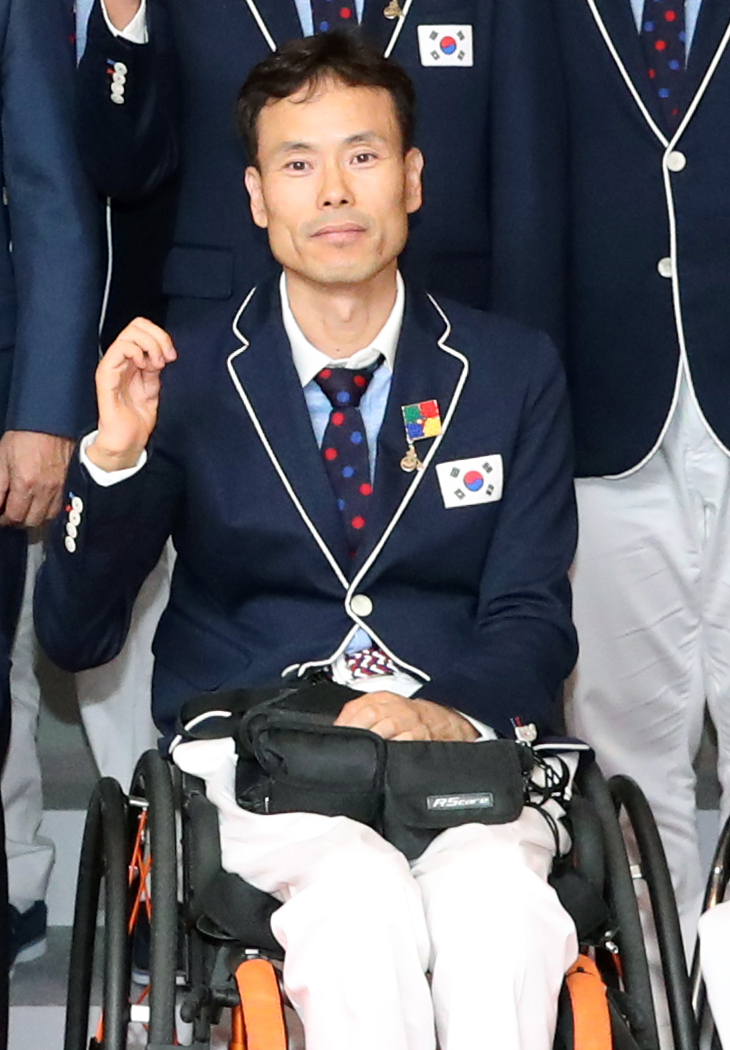
- Nam before the 2016 Summer Paralympics

Personal information
- Born: 26 May 1966 (age 60) Boryeong, South Chungcheong, South Korea
- Height: 172 cm (5 ft 8 in)
- Weight: 51 kg (112 lb)

Sport
- Sport: Table tennis
- Playing style: Left-handed shakehand grip
- Disability class: 1
- Highest ranking: 2 (June 2019)
- Current ranking: 3 (February 2020)
Medal record
Men's para table tennis
Representing South Korea
Paralympic Games
Bronze medal – third place	2016 Rio de Janeiro	Singles C1
Bronze medal – third place	2020 Tokyo	Singles C1
World Championships
Gold medal – first place	2014 Beijing	Singles C1
Silver medal – second place	2017 Bratislava	Teams C1
Asian Para Games
Gold medal – first place	2018 Jakarta	Singles C1
Gold medal – first place	2018 Jakarta	Teams C1–2
Silver medal – second place	2022 Hangzhou	Singles C1
Asian Championships
Gold medal – first place	2013 Beijing	Teams C4
Bronze medal – third place	2013 Beijing	Singles C1

Nam Ki-won (Korean: 남기원; RR: Nam Giwon, born 26 May 1966) is a South Korean para table tennis player. He won a bronze medal at the 2016 Summer Paralympics.

== Personal life ==
He had a spinal cord injury during a traffic accident in 1996 and stayed in bed for fifteen years until 2011.
