= Federico Falco (table tennis) =

Italian para table tennis player (born 1994)

Personal information
- Nationality: Italian
- Born: 22 March 1994 (age 32)

Sport
- Country: Italy
- Sport: Para table tennis
- Disability class: C1
Medal record
Para table tennis
Representing Italy
Paralympic Games
Bronze medal – third place	2024 Paris	Singles C1

Federico Falco (born 22 March 1994) is an Italian para table tennis player.

== Career ==
Falco represented Italy at the 2024 Summer Paralympics and won a bronze medal in the singles C1 event.
