= Pablo Ramírez Barrientos =

Cuban paralympic powerlifter

Sport
- Country: Cuba
- Sport: Powerlifting
Medal record
Powerlifting
Representing Cuba
Paralympic Games
Silver medal – second place	2024 Paris	54 kg
Parapan American Games
Silver medal – second place	2023 Santiago	54 kg

Pablo Ramírez Barrientos is a Cuban paralympic powerlifter. He competed at the 2024 Summer Paralympics, winning the silver medal in the men's 54 kg event.
