= Fernando Eberhardt =

Argentina para table tennis player

Personal information
- Full name: Fernando Emanuel Eberhardt
- Born: 21 June 1977 (age 49) Córdoba, Argentina

Sport
- Country: Argentina
- Sport: Para table tennis
- Disability class: C1
Medal record
Para table tennis
Representing Argentina
World Championships
Bronze medal – third place	2018 Lasko	Singles C1
Parapan American Games
Silver medal – second place	2011 Guadalajara	Teams C1-3
Silver medal – second place	2015 Toronto	Teams C1-2
Bronze medal – third place	2015 Toronto	Singles C1
Bronze medal – third place	2019 Lima	Singles C1
Bronze medal – third place	2019 Lima	Teams C1-2
Pan American Championships
Gold medal – first place	2013 San Jose	Singles C1
Gold medal – first place	2017 San Jose	Singles C1
Bronze medal – third place	2017 San Jose	Teams C3

Fernando Emanuel Eberhardt (born 21 June 1977) is an Argentina para table tennis player who competes in international table tennis competitions. He is a two-time Pan American champion, five-time Parapan American Games medalist and World bronze medalist. He has also competed at the 2012, 2016 and 2020 Summer Paralympics.
