= Andrea Borgato =

Italian para table tennis player (born 1972)

Personal information
- Nickname: Bocca
- Born: 14 December 1972 (age 53) Rovigo, Italy
- Home town: Solesino, Italy
- Height: 190 cm (6 ft 3 in)

Sport
- Country: Italy
- Sport: Para table tennis
- Disability: Spinal cord injury
- Disability class: C1
- Club: H81
- Coached by: Giovanni Bruttomesso
Medal record
Para table tennis
Representing Italy
World Championships
| Silver medal – second place | 2014 Beijing | Men's singles C1 |
World Team Championships
| Gold medal – first place | 2017 Bratislava | Men's team C1 |
European Championships
| Silver medal – second place | 2015 Vejle | Men's teams C1 |
| Bronze medal – third place | 2009 Genoa | Men's teams C1 |
| Bronze medal – third place | 2011 Split | Men's teams C1 |
| Bronze medal – third place | 2013 Lignano | Men's singles C1 |
| Bronze medal – third place | 2013 Lignano | Men's teams C1 |

Andrea Borgato (born 14 December 1972) is an Italian para table tennis player and has represented his country in the Summer Paralympics of 2012, 2016 and 2020. He became quadriplegic after being involved in a car accident in 1995.
