= Thomas Matthews (table tennis) =

British Paralympic table tennis player

Personal information
- Born: 19 August 1992 (age 33) Merthyr Tydfil, Wales, Great Britain

Sport
- Country: United Kingdom
- Sport: Para table tennis
- Disability class: C1
Medal record
Para table tennis
Representing Great Britain
Paralympic Games
Bronze medal – third place	2020 Tokyo	Singles C1
World Championships
Bronze medal – third place	2018 Lasko	Singles C1
World Team Championships
Bronze medal – third place	2017 Bratislava	Teams C1
European Championships
Gold medal – first place	2015 Vejle	Teams C1
Silver medal – second place	2017 Lasko	Singles C1
Bronze medal – third place	2015 Vejle	Singles C1

Thomas "Tom" Matthews (born 19 August 1992) is a British Paralympic table tennis player. At the 2020 Summer Paralympics, he won a bronze medal in the Men's individual class 1 event. Matthews is also a European champion and a World bronze medalist.

In 2009, Matthews was a very keen mountain biker, he went out for a bike ride with his uncle and a friend. Matthews went over the handle bars and broke his neck after going down a mountain too fast. While in rehabilitation in Rookwood Hospital, he was encouraged to try table tennis by Welsh para table tennis Paralympic medalist James Munkley when Munkley was visiting hospital wards in Wales and then Matthews joined the Welsh table tennis team in 2013 and competed internationally a year later.
