= Jean-François Ducay =

French para table tennis player

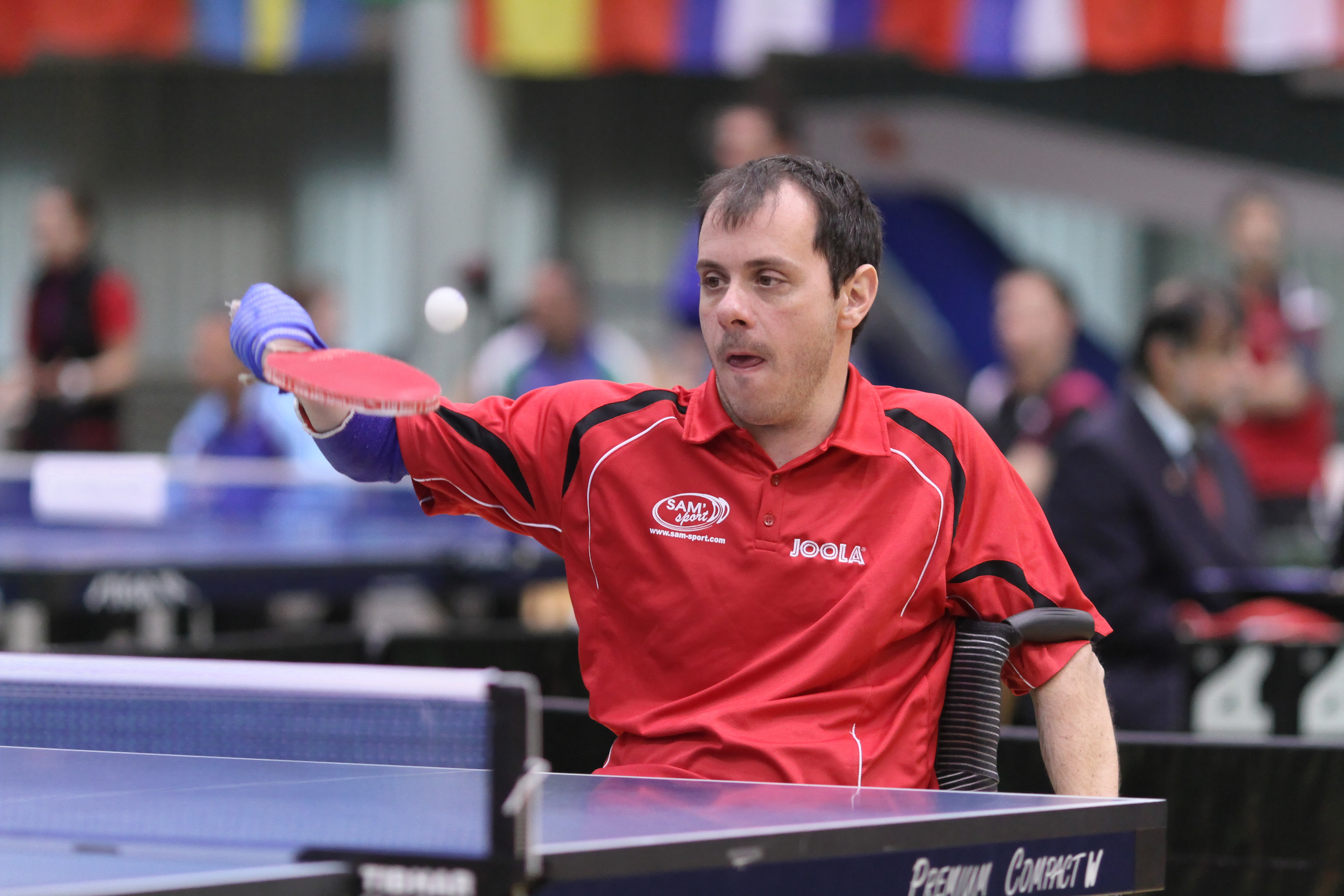
- Ducay at 2014 World Championships

Personal information
- Nationality: French
- Born: 22 June 1979 (age 47) Brive-la-Gaillarde, France
- Height: 183 cm (6 ft 0 in)
- Weight: 63 kg (139 lb)

Sport
- Country: France
- Sport: Para table tennis
- Disability: Cerebral palsy, tetraplegia
- Disability class: C1
- Club: Pana Loisirs Handisport
- Coached by: Benoit Froment
- Retired: 2016
Medal record
Table tennis
Representing France
Paralympic Games
Gold medal – first place	2016 Rio de Janeiro	Men's team C1-2
Silver medal – second place	2008 Beijing	Men's team C1-2
Silver medal – second place	2012 London	Men's singles C1
Silver medal – second place	2012 London	Men's team C1-2
World Championships
Gold medal – first place	2014 Beijing	Men's team C2
Silver medal – second place	2010 Gwangju	Men's singles C1
Silver medal – second place	2010 Gwangju	Men's teams C1-2
Bronze medal – third place	2006 Montreux	Men's singles C1
Bronze medal – third place	2006 Montreux	Men's teams C1
European Championships
Gold medal – first place	2011 Split	Men's teams C2
Gold medal – first place	2015 Vejle	Men's team C1
Silver medal – second place	2005 Jesolo	Men's singles C1
Silver medal – second place	2005 Jesolo	Men's teams C1
Silver medal – second place	2007 Kranjska Gora	Men's teams C1
Silver medal – second place	2009 Genoa	Men's teams C1
Silver medal – second place	2015 Vejle	Men's singles C1
Bronze medal – third place	2009 Genoa	Men's singles C1
Bronze medal – third place	2011 Split	Men's singles C1

Jean-François Ducay (born 22 June 1979) is a former French para table tennis player. He has participated in the Paralympic Games three times and has won three medals.
