= Holger Nikelis =

German para table tennis player (born 1978)

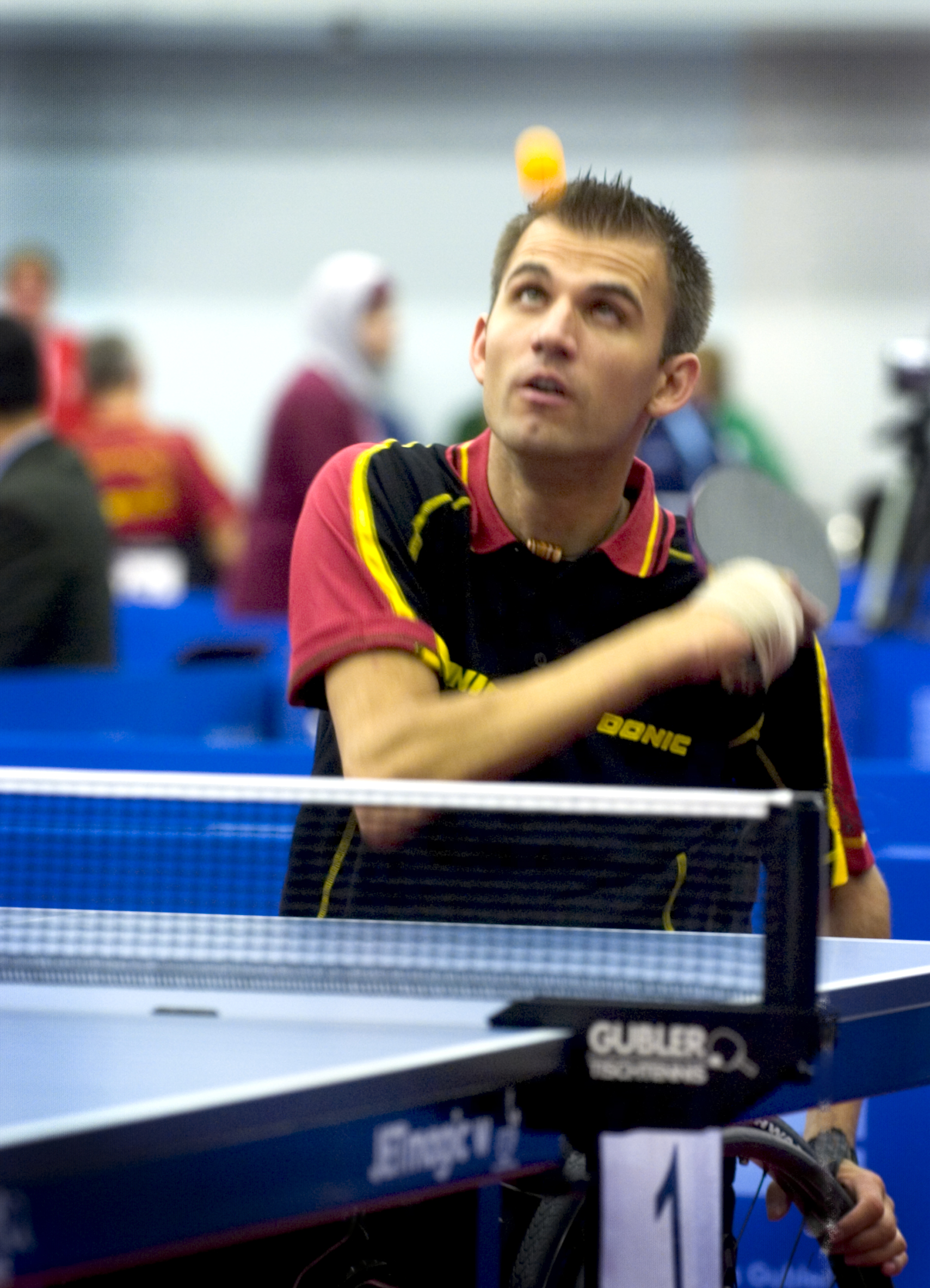
- Nikelis in 2008

Personal information
- Born: 15 January 1978 (age 48) Cologne, Germany
- Home town: Kuenzell, Germany
- Height: 183 cm (6 ft 0 in)

Sport
- Country: Germany
- Sport: Para table tennis
- Disability: Spinal cord injury
- Disability class: C1
- Club: Rollstuhlclub Koeln
- Retired: 2016
Medal record
Para table tennis
Representing Germany
Paralympic Games
Gold medal – first place	2004 Athens	Singles class 1
Bronze medal – third place	2004 Athens	Team class 1-2
Gold medal – first place	2012 London	Singles class 1
Silver medal – second place	2012 London	Team class 3
World Championships
Silver medal – second place	2002 Taipei	Singles class 1
Gold medal – first place	2006 Montreux	Singles class 1
Silver medal – second place	2006 Montreux	Teams class 1
Gold medal – first place	2010 Gwangju	Singles class 1
Silver medal – second place	2014 Beijing	Teams class 1
Bronze medal – third place	2014 Beijing	Singles class 1
European Championships
Gold medal – first place	2001 Frankfurt	Singles class 1
Gold medal – first place	2003 Zagreb	Singles class 1
Bronze medal – third place	2003 Zagreb	Teams class 1-2
Gold medal – first place	2005 Jesolo	Singles class 1
Gold medal – first place	2005 Jesolo	Teams class 1
Gold medal – first place	2007 Kranjska Gora	Teams class 1
Gold medal – first place	2009 Genoa	Singles class 1
Gold medal – first place	2009 Genoa	Teams class 1
Silver medal – second place	2013 Lignano	Teams class 1
Bronze medal – third place	2013 Lignano	Singles class 1

Holger Nikelis (born 15 January 1978) is a German table tennis player. He won a gold medal in the singles event and a bronze in the team event at the 2004 Summer Paralympics. He also competed at the 2008 Summer Olympics and the 2012 Summer Olympics. He has also won other medals and championships in disabled table tennis. He was world number one in his category in September 2013.
