= Kevin Hensley (soccer) =

American Paralympic soccer player (born 1992)

Personal information
- Nationality: United States
- Born: May 24, 1992 (age 34) Memphis, Tennessee
- Education: Carson-Newman University
- Height: 1.87 m (6 ft 1 1/2 in)
- Weight: 185 lb (84 kg)

Sport
- Sport: Soccer / Cerebral palsy soccer
- College team: Carson-Newman University
- Now coaching: Lobos 06 Elite
Medal record
Paralympic 7-a-side football
America's Cup
Bronze medal – third place	2014	Men's
- Updated on 18 June 2016

Kevin Hensley (born May 24, 1992) is an American Paralympic soccer player. Hensley started playing soccer when he was very young, and went on to play for Tennessee Boys State Teams and varsity soccer for Collierville High School. When he was 14 years old, he had a freak stroke while playing soccer that left him with paralysis on the right side of his body. This adversely impacted his academic ability and ability to play soccer. He eventually went into coaching on the soccer side.

Despite the medical issues, new USPNT head coach Stuart Sharp invited him to play for the US Paralympic National Team in April 2014. He went on to participate in several national team training camps, friendlies and tournaments. He won bronze with the team at the 2014 America's Cup, and was the 2015 U.S. Soccer's Young Disabled Player of the Year. Hensley was with the team through 2016 Summer Paralympics qualifying events and training camps.

== Personal ==
Hensley was born on May 24, 1992, and is from Memphis, Tennessee. He went to Collierville High School in Collierville, Tennessee, and then attended Carson-Newman University. He has partial paralysis on his right side as a result of a stroke when he was 14 years old. Ensuing medical issues have also resulted in memory problems that adversely impacted his academic ability.

== Soccer ==
Hensley played able-bodied soccer when he was younger. His grandmother was one of his biggest fans. Clubs he played for as a youngster included Lobos 91, MidSouth FC 92, FC Alliance 92 U8 to U20, and Tennessee ODP 92 boys State Team U13 to U17. On December 23, 2006, while playing the sport when he was a 14-year-old, he had a freak stroke following a header that left him with paralysis on the right side of his body.

Despite the stroke, Hensley went through rehabilitation and played varsity soccer in high school for Collierville High School Varsity. He got All State honors in 2009 and 2010. He was offered a scholarship to play soccer for Carson-Newman University in 2011, but had a short lived playing career as a result of memory problems. The year he played for Carson-Newman, they won the South Atlantic Conference Championship. He continued to be involved with soccer, becoming an assistant coach for the Mid-South Football Club in 2012. He earned a pair of coaching licenses including the United States Soccer Federation E Coaching License and the United States Soccer Federation National Youth License.

== Cerebral palsy football ==
Hensley is a CP8 footballer, and plays in the defense.

Hensley had little experience with CP football. He was invited to the national team after becoming an assistant coach at the Mid-South Football Club after new head coach Stuart Sharp read about his story in a newspaper story online.

In April 2014, Hensley was invited to participate in a week long national team training camp at the Olympic Training Center in Chula Vista, California. The camp was being held in preparation for the 7-a-side Football Ciutat de Barcelona in June of that year. At the camp, he played in a pair of friendlies against England with his team losing both games 2-1 and 3–2. Hensley scored a goal in the second game that made the game 2 - 2 before England answered back. He was part of the United States team that participated in the 2014 Americas Cup. Hensley scored his team's second goal in the bronze medal match against Canada on the way to the team's 3 - 0 victory.

Hensley was the 2015 U.S. Soccer's Young Disabled Player of the Year, winning the award the first time he was nominated. He was nominated alongside teammate Adam Ballou and US national amputee football team players Nicolai Calabria and Noah Grove. He participated in every national team training camp in 2015, and captained the squad during a number of tournaments in the year.

In March 2015, Hensley was part of the 14 man roster that participated in the Povoa de Varzim, Portugal hosted Footie 7 – Povoa 2015 tournament. The competition was a warmup for the World Championships that were held in England in June 2015. He was invited to a national team training camp that took place from April 29 to May 6, 2015, in Carson, California. This camp was in preparation for the 2015 Cerebral Palsy Football World Championships in June of that year in England. At the World Championships, he scored important goals that allowed the United States to qualify for the Rio Games. Participating at that competition, he scored a goal in the US's game 3–0 victory against Venezuela. At that competition, he stayed on the bench in the team's 10 - 0 loss to England. It was his first World Championships as a member of the national team.

Hensley captained the 14 man squad that represented the United States at the 2015 Parapan American Games in Toronto. There, the United States played Canada, Venezuela, Argentina and Brazil. They finished third in their group. Through the Wish of a Lifetime program, his grandmother who was living in an assisted living care center was able to go to Toronto to watch Hensley compete in two games.

Hensley took part in a national team training camp in Chula Vista, California in early March 2016. He was part of the United States Paralympic National Team that took part in the 2016 Pre Paralympic Tournament in Salou, Spain. The United States finished 6th after beating Argentina in one placement match 4 - 3 and losing to Ireland 4 - 1. The goals scored in the match against Argentina were the first the USA scored in the tournament, before putting up one more in their match against Ireland. The tournament featured 7 of the 8 teams participating in Rio. It was the last major preparation event ahead of the Rio Games for all teams participating.
