= Lee Chang-ho (table tennis) =

South Korean para table tennis player

Personal information
- Born: May 1, 1969 (age 57) Daegu, South Korea
- Height: 175 cm (5 ft 9 in)
- Weight: 80 kg (176 lb)

Sport
- Sport: Table tennis
- Playing style: Right-handed shakehand grip
- Disability class: 1
- Highest ranking: 2 (July 2017)
Medal record
Men's para table tennis
Representing South Korea
Paralympic Games
Bronze medal – third place	2012 London	Teams C1–2
World Championships
Gold medal – first place	2014 Beijing	Singles C1
Gold medal – first place	2014 Beijing	Teams C1
Bronze medal – third place	2010 Gwangju	Teams C1–2
Asian Championships
Gold medal – first place	2009 Amman	Teams C1–3
Gold medal – first place	2011 Hong Kong	Singles C1
Gold medal – first place	2013 Beijing	Singles C1
Bronze medal – third place	2007 Seoul	Singles C1

Lee Chang-ho (Korean: 이창호; RR: I Changho, born 1 May 1969) is a South Korean former para table tennis player. He won a bronze medal at the 2012 Summer Paralympics. He was coached by Choi Kyoung-sik.

He injured his spinal cord during a car accident in 1996.
